= The Racer's Group =

Racing team

TRG
- Owner: Kevin Buckler
- Base: Petaluma, California
- Series: TUDOR United SportsCar Championship; GT4 Challenge of North America; Pirelli World Challenge Championship
- Manufacturer: Aston Martin; Aston Martin V12 Vantage GT3, V8 Vantage GT4
- Website: www.theracersgroup.com www.trg-amr.com

The Racer's Group, or TRG, is a WeatherTech SportsCar Championship racing team located in Petaluma, California, owned by Kevin Buckler and his wife Debra. TRG has competed professionally in road racing since 1995. The team formerly competed in NASCAR as TRG Motorsports from 2007 to 2011.

== Early history ==
In 1992, Buckler started racing in regional Porsche Club races, working his way through the ranks before entering his first professional race at the 1995 IMSA Grand Prix of California, which he ended up winning. From then until 2001, The Racer's Group ran part-time schedules with various drivers. Just before the 2002 season started, the Porsche factory offered to support the team at the Rolex 24 at Daytona by lending the services of factory drivers Timo Bernhard and Jörg Bergmeister.

== Major victories ==
After seven previous attempts at Daytona, The Racer's Group, with drivers Buckler, Bernhard, Bergmeister, and Michael Schrom, won the GT class at the 2002 Rolex 24 Hours of Daytona. With the success of the team at Daytona, the Porsche factory again provided TRG with factory support and drivers for the 2002 24 Hours of Le Mans. In one of the closest GT races in history, Buckler, Bernhard, and Lucas Luhr edged the Freisinger Motorsport team by little more than one minute to capture a win at the team's maiden run at the 24 Hours of Le Mans. As the American Le Mans Series and Grand American seasons continued, The Racer's Group strung together a long series of high finishes, including wins at the Grand Prix of Mosport, Grand Prix of Mid-Ohio, and the Grand-Am 400 at California Speedway. TRG finished on the podium 14 times in 2002, including 8 in a row in the ALMS.

After the season, Buckler and co-driver Schrom had a 1-2 finish in the Porsche World Cup. The award, given annually to the top independent Porsche drivers in the world, was given to Buckler at the Porsche factory in Weissach, Germany, in December 2002. Buckler and Schrom were the first and only teammates to finish 1-2 in the Porsche Cup. They followed the award up with a win at the 24 Hours of Daytona since 1977, becoming the first GT-class team to win overall.

== Pontiac GTO.R GM factory team ==
2003 and the few years beyond saw TRG continue to compete in ALMS and Grand American. In 2005, TRG was selected by GM as a factory team. Pontiac Motorsports and TRG teamed up to race the new generation of Pontiac GTO vehicles, specifically twin GTO.R's. GM brought in Paul Edwards and Jan Magnussen to drive the No. 64, while TRG hired Marc Bunting and Andy Lally to drive of the No. 65. In 2006, Kelly Collins replaced Magnussen, the same year Pontiac won the manufacturer's championship, TRG took 1st and 3rd in the team championship, and drivers Bunting and Lally took won the driver's championship.

In 2006, Marc Bunting and Andy Lally won the GT drivers championship, and Bunting won the Bob Akin Sportsman Award. TRG won the GT team championship, second straight year. Lally and Bunting broke the record for most podium finishes with 14 of a possible 16 this year. The old record was their own, set in 2004 of 11 podium finishes.

The TRG GTO.R Daytona 24 Hour effort was the subject of a six-part documentary by noted film maker Sean Heckman and is currently playing on INHD.

== 2007–present ==
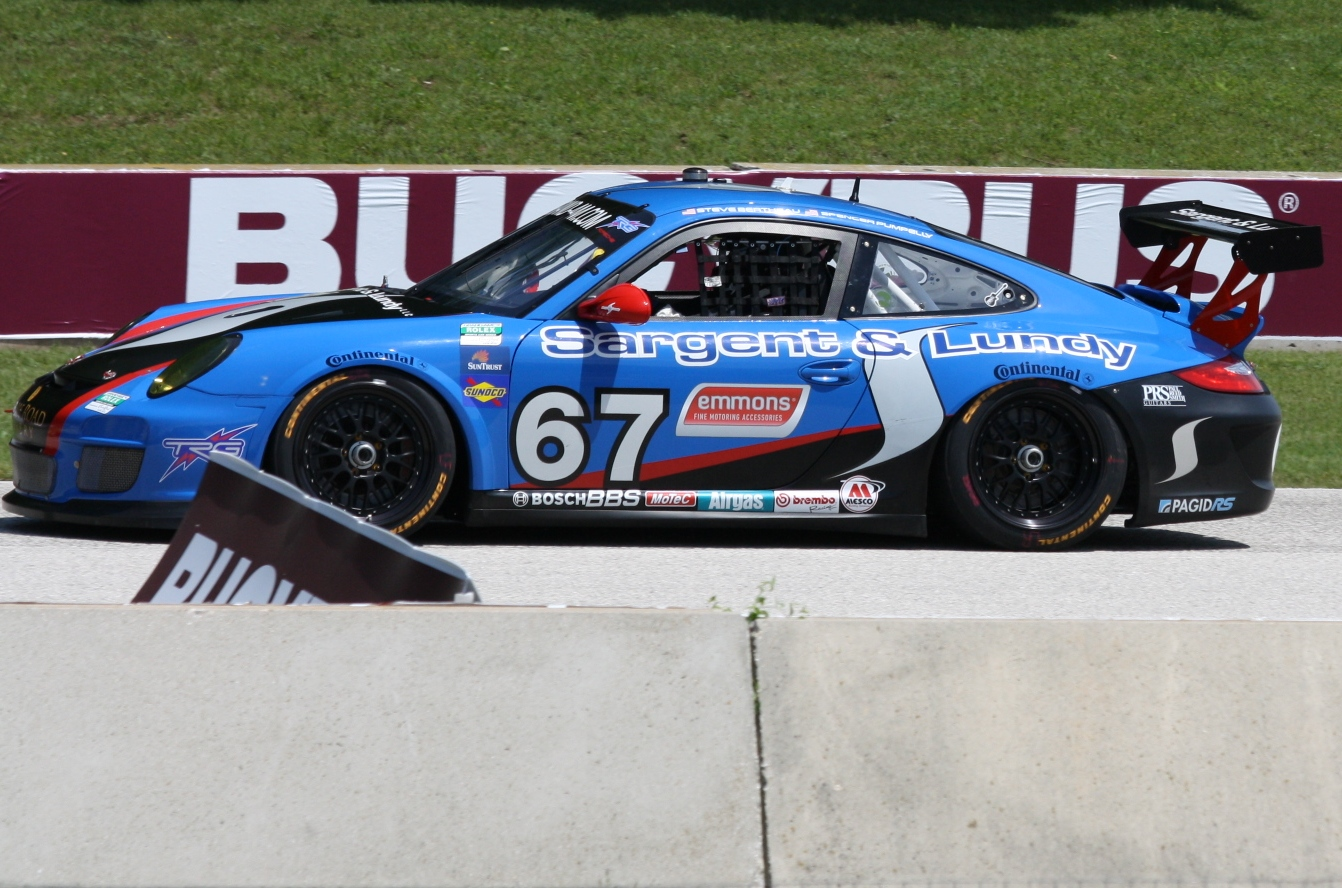
2011 GT car No. 67

The GTO program has been discontinued by GM as of the 2006 season end, and TRG returned Porsche vehicles in 2007, as well as running in the DP class. They began 2008 with second, third, and fourth-place finishes at the 24 Hours of Daytona.

For the 2015 United SportsCar Championship season, TRG entered one Aston Martin Vantage GT3 for a full season with drivers Christina Nielsen and James Davison running the number 007. The team recorded a runner-up class finish at Sebring.

== NASCAR ==
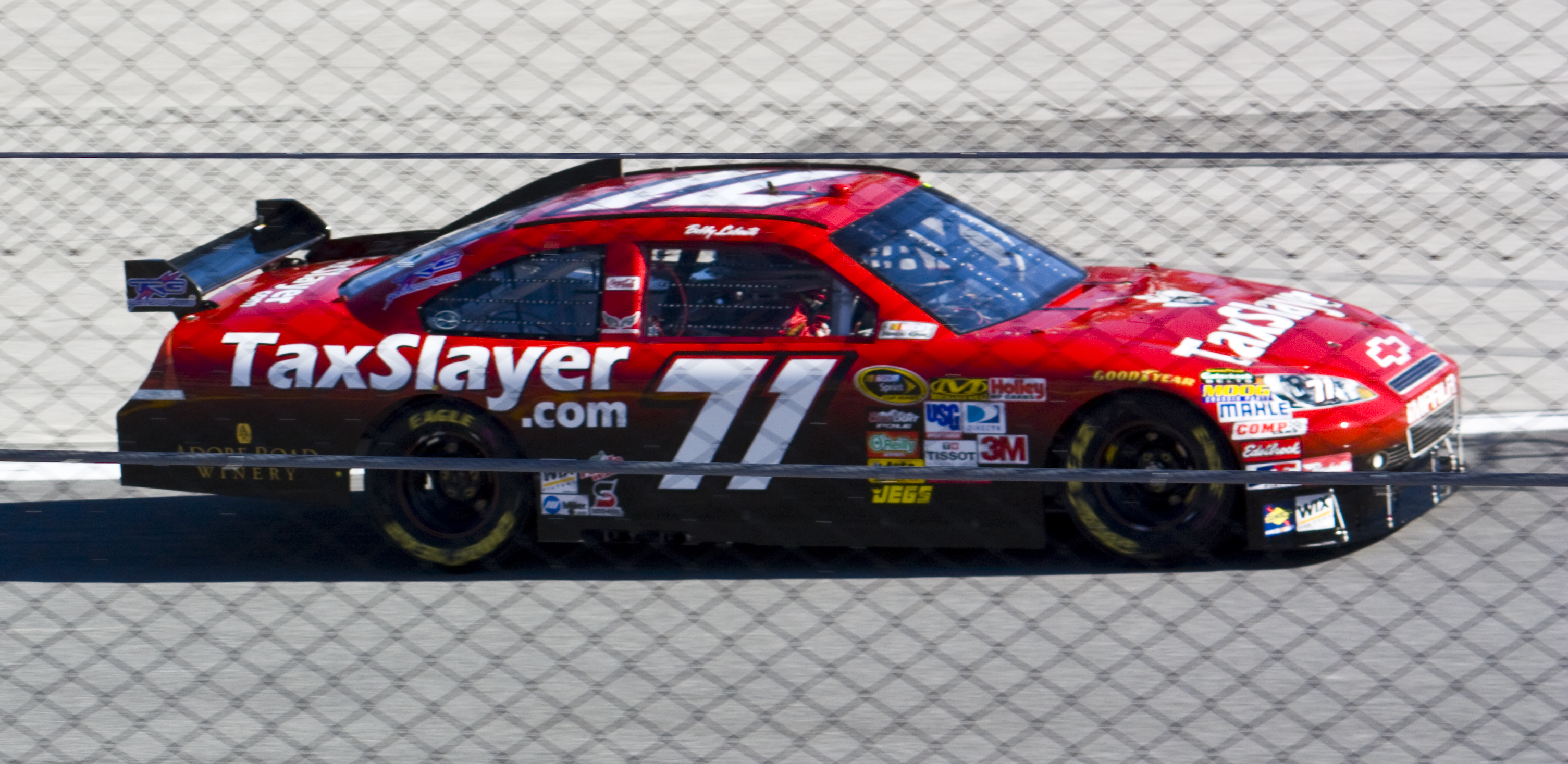
Bobby Labonte in the No. 71 car at Daytona International Speedway in 2010

Co-driver R. J. Valentine announced Lally's plans to race in the NASCAR Busch Series, possibly with support from TRG during the broadcast of the Grand-Am Rolex Sports Car Series GT Race at Iowa Speedway on July 14, 2007. Lally raced the No. 47 Clorox Ford Fusion in the NASCAR Busch Series road races at Circuit Gilles Villeneuve on August 4 and Watkins Glen on August 11 as part of a partnership between TRG and Wood Brothers/JTG Racing. He finished 29th and 10th respectively. In October 2007, TRG purchased the assets of Darrell Waltrip Motorsports' Craftsman Truck Series team, with Lally serving as the team's driver and United States Army Reserve sponsoring the No. 00 Toyota Tundra.

In 2008, TRG switched to Chevrolet Silverados and formed a second team. They began the 2008 season fielding entries in the No. 7 for Lally and the No. 71 for fellow rookie Donny Lia. Lia won in his 8th career start in Mansfield driving the No. 71 TRG truck. Midway through the season, sponsorship issues forced Lally to cut a part-time schedule. He was replaced by Nevada driver T. J. Bell for the rest of the season. Lally would return to the No. 71 late in the year when the team released Lia, followed by Ben Stancill and J. R. Fitzpatrick. Bell had a streak of five consecutive top-tens and had a total of seven on the year.

In 2009, TRG Motorsports announced they would field a full-time team in the NASCAR Sprint Cup with the number 71. The team also ran a second car in a few races using the number 70. After failing to make the Daytona 500 with Mike Wallace, the team signed David Gilliland and was 35th in points after Bristol, guaranteeing the team a start in Martinsville, only to fall out of the top-35 after the event. They were sponsored by Capital Windows and had announced an agreement to be sponsored by American Monster that fell through. The team shut down its Truck team very early into the season. In the summer, TaxSlayer.com became the team's new sponsor. Starting with the September race in Atlanta, Bobby Labonte began to share the ride with Gilliland. Mike Bliss also filled in for the team on occasion.

Labonte competed the first half of the season for the team in 2010. TaxSlayer.com sponsored the team for twelve races. Since the team was not sponsored for the full season, a number of races resulted in a start-and-park situation. At Dover, the team quit after 65 laps. On June 23, Labonte parted ways with TRG Motorsports. Bliss finished ninth at Daytona. Andy Lally, Landon Cassill, Chad McCumbee and Tony Raines also drove the No. 71. Hermie Sadler made his first start since 2006 at the October Martinsville race. Brendan Gaughan raced at Phoenix, his first Cup race since 2004. Despite the team's sponsorship troubles and driver changes, TRG Motorsports finished 35th in the owner's points, guaranteeing the team a start for the first five races of 2011.

Owner Kevin Buckler said on NASCAR Race Hub before the Watkins Glen race that the No. 71 team would continue to race full-time in 2011. Lally announced he would run for Rookie of the Year honors. On March 23, 2011, Buckler announced that the team is switching manufacturers to Ford, beginning at Texas. They also went into a support program with Roush Fenway Racing. Late in 2011, TRG ran a second car, a No. 77. Lally drove the car at Charlotte (with Hermie Sadler in the 71) to a 42nd-place finish. T. J. Bell attempted Talladega in the car, with the late Dan Wheldon's name adorning the namerail, but did not qualify. The No. 71 entry struggled at the end of the season and finished 36th in owner's points, not guaranteeing the team a start for the first five races of 2012. TRG suspended its NASCAR team for 2012. Lally left NASCAR and returned to the Rolex Sports Car Series.

Before closing operations, TRG Motorsports, TRG, and Adobe Road Winery filed a defamation lawsuit against their former marketing agent, Jason Medbury, whose firm, Media Barons in Los Angeles, established a parody website of Buckler's firms and teams under the title, "Generic Race Team" and "GRT." The case was dismissed on free speech grounds and a successful anti-SLAPP motion by the defense.

=== Cup Series ===
==== Car No. 71 results ====
Year	Driver	No.	Make	1	2	3	4	5	6	7	8	9	10	11	12	13	14	15	16	17	18	19	20	21	22	23	24	25	26	27	28	29	30	31	32	33	34	35	36	Owners	Pts
2009	Mike Wallace	71	Chevy	DAY; DNQ																																				37th	2215
2009	David Gilliland	71	Chevy		CAL; 33	LVS; 14	ATL; 24	BRI; 36	MAR; 36	TEX; 29	PHO; 33	TAL; 40	RCH; 39	DAR; 43	CLT; 27	DOV; 43	POC; 42	MCH; 32	SON; 32	NHA; 40	DAY; 40	CHI; 42	IND; 30	POC; 41		MCH; 40	BRI; 39				DOV; 39		CAL; 42		MAR; 39					37th	2215
2009	Andy Lally	71	Chevy																						GLN; 27															37th	2215
2009	Bobby Labonte	71	Chevy																									ATL; 18		NHA; 22		KAN; 43				TAL; 10	TEX; 31	PHO; 39	HOM; 31	37th	2215
2009	Mike Bliss	71	Chevy																										RCH; 42					CLT; 24						37th	2215
2010	Bobby Labonte	71	Chevy	DAY; 21	CAL; 27	LVS; 38	ATL; 22	BRI; 21	MAR; 29	PHO; 27	TEX; 23	TAL; 23	RCH; 33	DAR; 34	DOV; 39	CLT; 31	POC; 38	MCH; 41	SON; 23					POC; 28		MCH; 33		ATL; 31												35th	2549
2010	Andy Lally	71	Chevy																	NHA; 37					GLN; 18					NHA; 37			CAL; 36	CLT; 34			TEX; 34		HOM; 29	35th	2549
2010	Mike Bliss	71	Chevy																		DAY; 9																			35th	2549
2010	Landon Cassill	71	Chevy																			CHI; 39	IND; 39				BRI; 37		RCH; 33		DOV; 38									35th	2549
2010	Tony Raines	71	Chevy																													KAN; 39								35th	2549
2010	Hermie Sadler	71	Chevy																																MAR; 26					35th	2549
2010	Chad McCumbee	71	Chevy																																	TAL; 22				35th	2549
2010	Brendan Gaughan	71	Chevy																																			PHO; 43		35th	2549
2011	Andy Lally	71	Chevy	DAY; 33	PHO; 31	LVS; 32	BRI; 32	CAL; 32																																36th	466
2011	Andy Lally	71	Ford							TEX; 32	TAL; 19	RCH; 26	DAR; DNQ	DOV; 33	CLT; DNQ	KAN; 31	POC; 32	MCH; 36	SON; 35	DAY; 27	KEN; 32	NHA; 28	IND; 26	POC; 29	GLN; 24	MCH; 29	BRI; 25	ATL; 30	RCH; 32	CHI; 28	NHA; 34	DOV; 33	KAN; 37		TAL; 39		TEX; 29	PHO; DNQ		36th	466
2011	Hermie Sadler	71	Chevy						MAR; 28																															36th	466
2011	Hermie Sadler	71	Ford																															CLT; 33		MAR; 26				36th	466
2011	Mike Bliss	71	Ford																																				HOM; 21	36th	466

==== Car No. 70/77 results ====
Year	Driver	No.	Make	1	2	3	4	5	6	7	8	9	10	11	12	13	14	15	16	17	18	19	20	21	22	23	24	25	26	27	28	29	30	31	32	33	34	35	36	Owners	Pts
2009	David Gilliland	70	Chevy	DAY	CAL	LVS	ATL	BRI	MAR	TEX	PHO	TAL	RCH	DAR	CLT	DOV	POC	MCH	SON	NHA	DAY	CHI	IND	POC	GLN; DNQ	MCH	BRI	ATL	RCH	NHA	DOV	KAN	CAL	CLT	MAR	TAL				56th	112
2009	Mike Skinner	70	Chevy																																		TEX; 43		HOM; DNQ	56th	112
2009	Kevin Conway	70	Chevy																																			PHO; DNQ		56th	112
2011	Andy Lally	77	Ford	DAY	PHO	LVS	BRI	CAL	MAR	TEX	TAL	RCH	DAR	DOV	CLT	KAN	POC	MCH	SON	DAY	KEN	NHA	IND	POC	GLN	MCH	BRI	ATL	RCH	CHI	NHA	DOV	KAN	CLT; 43						58th	0
2011	T. J. Bell	77	Ford																																TAL; DNQ	MAR	TEX	PHO	HOM	58th	0

=== Truck Series ===
==== Truck No. 7 results ====
Year	Driver	No.	Make	1	2	3	4	5	6	7	8	9	10	11	12	13	14	15	16	17	18	19	20	21	22	23	24	25	Owners	Pts
2007	Andy Lally	00	Toyota	DAY	CAL	ATL	MAR	KAN	CLT	MFD	DOV	TEX	MCH	MLW	MEM	KEN	IRP	NSH	BRI	GTW	NHA	LVS	TAL	MAR	ATL	TEX; 22	PHO; 31	HOM; 33	23rd	2021
2008	Andy Lally	7	Chevy	DAY; 11	CAL; 29	ATL; 22	MAR; 36	KAN; 29	CLT; 16	MFD; 14	DOV; 22																		22nd	2673
2008	T. J. Bell	7	Chevy									TEX; 31	MCH; 20	MLW; 29	MEM; 18	KEN; 25	IRP; 7	NSH; 19	BRI; 6	GTW; 29	NHA; 10	LVS; 8	TAL; 8	MAR; 6	ATL; 9	TEX; 32	PHO; 27	HOM; 12	22nd	2673
2009	J. R. Fitzpatrick	7	Chevy	DAY; 4	CAL; 22	ATL; 22	MAR; 21																						40th	670
2009	Frank Deiny Jr.	7	Chevy					KAN; 34																					40th	670
2009	David Gilliland	7	Chevy						CLT; 6	DOV	TEX	MCH	MLW	MEM	KEN	IRP	NSH	BRI	CHI	IOW	GTW	NHA	LVS	MAR	TAL	TEX	PHO	HOM	40th	670

==== Truck No. 71 results ====
Year	Driver	No.	Make	1	2	3	4	5	6	7	8	9	10	11	12	13	14	15	16	17	18	19	20	21	22	23	24	25	Owners	Pts
2008	Mike Bliss	71	Chevy	DAY; 33																									29th	2124
2008	Donny Lia	71	Chevy		CAL; 26	ATL; 20	MAR; 9	KAN; 12	CLT; 34	MFD; 1	DOV; 17	TEX; 19	MCH; 12	MLW; 22	MEM; 26	KEN; 20	IRP; 9	NSH; 16	BRI; 12										29th	2124
2008	Andy Lally	71	Chevy																	GTW; 20	NHA	LVS	TAL						29th	2124
2008	Ben Stancill	71	Chevy																					MAR; 20	ATL	TEX			29th	2124
2008	J. R. Fitzpatrick	71	Chevy																								PHO; 30	HOM; 32	29th	2124
