= 2005 Subway Fresh 500 =

Eighth race of the 2005 NASCAR Nextel Cup Series

Race details
- Race 8 of 36 in the 2005 NASCAR Nextel Cup Series
- The 2005 Subway Fresh 500 program cover.
- Date: April 23, 2005
- Official name: Inaugural Subway Fresh 500
- Location: Avondale, Arizona, Phoenix International Raceway
- Course: Permanent racing facility
- Course length: 1 miles (1.609 km)
- Distance: 312 laps, 312 mi (502.115 km)
- Average speed: 102.707 miles per hour (165.291 km/h)
- Attendance: 105,000

Pole position
Driver	Jeff Gordon	Hendrick Motorsports
- Time: 26.931

Most laps led
Driver	Kurt Busch	Roush Racing
- Laps: 219

Winner
No. 97	Kurt Busch	Roush Racing

Television in the United States
- Network: FOX
- Announcers: Mike Joy, Larry McReynolds, Darrell Waltrip

Radio in the United States
- Radio: Motor Racing Network

The 2005 Subway Fresh 500 was the eighth stock car race of the 2005 NASCAR Nextel Cup Series season and the inaugural iteration of the event. The race was held on Saturday, April 23, 2005, in Avondale, Arizona at Phoenix International Raceway, a 1-mile (1.6 km) permanent low-banked tri-oval race track. The race took the scheduled 312 laps to complete. At race's end, Roush Racing driver Kurt Busch would dominate the majority of the race to take his 12th career NASCAR Nextel Cup Series victory and his first victory of the season. To fill out the top three, Dale Earnhardt, Inc. driver Michael Waltrip and Richard Childress Racing driver Jeff Burton would finish second and third, respectively.

== Background ==
The layout of Phoenix International Raceway, the venue where the race was held.

Phoenix International Raceway – also known as PIR – is a one-mile, low-banked tri-oval race track located in Avondale, Arizona. It is named after the nearby metropolitan area of Phoenix. The motorsport track opened in 1964 and currently hosts two NASCAR race weekends annually. PIR has also hosted the IndyCar Series, CART, USAC and the Rolex Sports Car Series. The raceway is currently owned and operated by International Speedway Corporation.

The raceway was originally constructed with a 2.5 mi (4.0 km) road course that ran both inside and outside of the main tri-oval. In 1991 the track was reconfigured with the current 1.51 mi (2.43 km) interior layout. PIR has an estimated grandstand seating capacity of around 67,000. Lights were installed around the track in 2004 following the addition of a second annual NASCAR race weekend.

=== Entry list ===
- (R) denotes rookie driver.

#	Driver	Team	Make	Sponsor
0	Mike Bliss	Haas CNC Racing	Chevrolet	NetZero
00	Carl Long	McGlynn Racing	Chevrolet	Buyer's Choice Auto Warranties
01	Joe Nemechek	MB2 Motorsports	Chevrolet	United States Army
2	Rusty Wallace	Penske Racing	Dodge	Miller Lite
02	Brandon Ash	Ash Motorsports	Ford	Ash Motorsports
4	Mike Wallace	Morgan–McClure Motorsports	Chevrolet	Lucas Oil
5	Kyle Busch (R)	Hendrick Motorsports	Chevrolet	Kellogg's
6	Mark Martin	Roush Racing	Ford	Reverse Viagra
7	Robby Gordon	Robby Gordon Motorsports	Chevrolet	Harrah's
07	Dave Blaney	Richard Childress Racing	Chevrolet	Jack Daniel's
8	Dale Earnhardt Jr.	Dale Earnhardt, Inc.	Chevrolet	Budweiser
9	Kasey Kahne	Evernham Motorsports	Dodge	Dodge
09	Johnny Sauter	Phoenix Racing	Dodge	Miccosukee Resort & Gaming
10	Scott Riggs	MBV Motorsports	Chevrolet	Centrix Financial
11	Jason Leffler	Joe Gibbs Racing	Chevrolet	FedEx Express
12	Ryan Newman	Penske Racing	Dodge	Alltel
15	Michael Waltrip	Dale Earnhardt, Inc.	Chevrolet	NAPA Auto Parts
16	Greg Biffle	Roush Racing	Ford	Subway
17	Matt Kenseth	Roush Racing	Ford	DeWalt
18	Bobby Labonte	Joe Gibbs Racing	Chevrolet	Interstate Batteries
19	Jeremy Mayfield	Evernham Motorsports	Dodge	Dodge
20	Tony Stewart	Joe Gibbs Racing	Chevrolet	The Home Depot
21	Ricky Rudd	Wood Brothers Racing	Ford	United States Air Force
22	Scott Wimmer	Bill Davis Racing	Dodge	Caterpillar
24	Jeff Gordon	Hendrick Motorsports	Chevrolet	DuPont
25	Brian Vickers	Hendrick Motorsports	Chevrolet	GMAC, Ditech
29	Kevin Harvick	Richard Childress Racing	Chevrolet	GM Goodwrench
31	Jeff Burton	Richard Childress Racing	Chevrolet	Cingular Wireless
32	Bobby Hamilton Jr.	PPI Motorsports	Chevrolet	Tide
33	Clint Bowyer	Richard Childress Racing	Chevrolet	Sylvania
34	Steve Portenga	Mach 1 Racing	Chevrolet	Mach 1 Racing
37	Kevin Lepage	R&J Racing	Dodge	R&J Racing
38	Elliott Sadler	Robert Yates Racing	Ford	Dark Chocolate M&M's, Star Wars: Episode III – Revenge of the Sith
40	Sterling Marlin	Chip Ganassi Racing with Felix Sabates	Dodge	Coors Light
41	Casey Mears	Chip Ganassi Racing with Felix Sabates	Dodge	Target
42	Jamie McMurray	Chip Ganassi Racing with Felix Sabates	Dodge	Home123
43	Jeff Green	Petty Enterprises	Dodge	Cheerios
45	Kyle Petty	Petty Enterprises	Dodge	Georgia-Pacific Brawny
48	Jimmie Johnson	Hendrick Motorsports	Chevrolet	Lowe's
49	Ken Schrader	BAM Racing	Dodge	Schwan's Home Service
66	Hermie Sadler	Peak Fitness Racing	Ford	Peak Fitness
77	Travis Kvapil (R)	Penske Racing	Dodge	Kodak
88	Dale Jarrett	Robert Yates Racing	Ford	Milk Chocolate M&M's, Star Wars: Episode III – Revenge of the Sith
92	Stanton Barrett (R)	Front Row Motorsports	Chevrolet	Holiday Inn
97	Kurt Busch	Roush Racing	Ford	Irwin Industrial Tools
99	Carl Edwards	Roush Racing	Ford	Scotts
Official entry list

== Practice ==
=== First practice ===
The first practice session was held on Thursday, April 21, at 5:55 PM EST. The session would last for one hour. Travis Kvapil, driving for Penske Racing, would set the fastest time in the session, with a lap of 27.466 and an average speed of 131.071 mph (210.938 km/h).

Pos.	#	Driver	Team	Make	Time	Speed
1	77	Travis Kvapil (R)	Penske Racing	Dodge	27.466	131.071
2	12	Ryan Newman	Penske Racing	Dodge	27.519	130.819
3	19	Jeremy Mayfield	Evernham Motorsports	Dodge	27.552	130.662
Full first practice results

=== Final practice ===
The final practice session, sometimes referred to as Happy Hour, was held on Thursday, April 21, at 9:15 PM EST. The session would last for 45 minutes. Ryan Newman, driving for Penske Racing, would set the fastest time in the session, with a lap of 27.356 and an average speed of 131.598 mph (211.786 km/h).

Pos.	#	Driver	Team	Make	Time	Speed
1	12	Ryan Newman	Penske Racing	Dodge	27.356	131.598
2	01	Joe Nemechek	MB2 Motorsports	Chevrolet	27.386	131.454
3	07	Dave Blaney	Richard Childress Racing	Chevrolet	27.424	131.272
Full Happy Hour practice results

== Qualifying ==
Qualifying was held on Friday, April 22, at 6:00 PM EST. Positions 1-42 would be decided by time, while the 43rd position would be given to a past champion who had not otherwise qualified. If no past champion needed it, the next team in owner's points would earn the spot. Also, if a team in the top 35 in owner's points had missed qualifying in the top 35, they would earn a spot between 36 and 42 if needed.

Jeff Gordon, driving for Hendrick Motorsports, would win the pole, setting a time of 26.931 and an average speed of 133.675 miles per hour (215.129 km/h).

Three drivers would fail to qualify.

=== Full qualifying results ===
Pos.	#	Driver	Team	Make	Time	Speed
1	24	Jeff Gordon	Hendrick Motorsports	Chevrolet	26.931	133.675
2	97	Kurt Busch	Roush Racing	Ford	27.016	133.254
3	16	Greg Biffle	Roush Racing	Ford	27.035	133.161
4	18	Bobby Labonte	Joe Gibbs Racing	Chevrolet	27.069	132.993
5	25	Brian Vickers	Hendrick Motorsports	Chevrolet	27.075	132.964
6	20	Tony Stewart	Joe Gibbs Racing	Chevrolet	27.078	132.949
7	12	Ryan Newman	Penske-Jasper Racing	Dodge	27.085	132.915
8	19	Jeremy Mayfield	Evernham Motorsports	Dodge	27.144	132.626
9	2	Rusty Wallace	Penske-Jasper Racing	Dodge	27.151	132.592
10	29	Kevin Harvick	Richard Childress Racing	Chevrolet	27.164	132.528
11	99	Carl Edwards	Roush Racing	Ford	27.168	132.509
12	48	Jimmie Johnson	Hendrick Motorsports	Chevrolet	27.169	132.504
13	01	Joe Nemechek	MB2 Motorsports	Chevrolet	27.205	132.329
14	9	Kasey Kahne	Evernham Motorsports	Dodge	27.230	132.207
15	8	Dale Earnhardt Jr.	Dale Earnhardt, Inc.	Chevrolet	27.240	132.159
16	10	Scott Riggs	MBV Motorsports	Chevrolet	27.280	131.965
17	17	Matt Kenseth	Roush Racing	Ford	27.290	131.917
18	11	Jason Leffler	Joe Gibbs Racing	Chevrolet	27.311	131.815
19	32	Bobby Hamilton Jr.	PPI Motorsports	Chevrolet	27.317	131.786
20	31	Jeff Burton	Richard Childress Racing	Chevrolet	27.321	131.767
21	07	Dave Blaney	Richard Childress Racing	Chevrolet	27.328	131.733
22	6	Mark Martin	Roush Racing	Ford	27.344	131.656
23	0	Mike Bliss	Haas CNC Racing	Chevrolet	27.349	131.632
24	77	Travis Kvapil (R)	Penske-Jasper Racing	Dodge	27.371	131.526
25	33	Clint Bowyer	Richard Childress Racing	Chevrolet	27.379	131.488
26	09	Johnny Sauter	Phoenix Racing	Dodge	27.380	131.483
27	5	Kyle Busch (R)	Hendrick Motorsports	Chevrolet	27.385	131.459
28	15	Michael Waltrip	Dale Earnhardt, Inc.	Chevrolet	27.401	131.382
29	37	Kevin Lepage	R&J Racing	Dodge	27.408	131.348
30	49	Ken Schrader	BAM Racing	Dodge	27.421	131.286
31	40	Sterling Marlin	Chip Ganassi Racing	Dodge	27.424	131.272
32	41	Casey Mears	Chip Ganassi Racing	Dodge	27.444	131.176
33	38	Elliott Sadler	Robert Yates Racing	Ford	27.473	131.038
34	42	Jamie McMurray	Chip Ganassi Racing	Dodge	27.501	130.904
35	88	Dale Jarrett	Robert Yates Racing	Ford	27.506	130.880
36	22	Scott Wimmer	Bill Davis Racing	Dodge	27.534	130.747
37	43	Jeff Green	Petty Enterprises	Dodge	27.556	130.643
38	21	Ricky Rudd	Wood Brothers Racing	Ford	27.566	130.596
39	45	Kyle Petty	Petty Enterprises	Dodge	27.692	130.001
40	92	Stanton Barrett (R)	Front Row Motorsports	Chevrolet	27.792	129.534
41	00	Carl Long	McGlynn Racing	Chevrolet	27.853	129.250
Qualified by owner's points
42	4	Mike Wallace	Morgan–McClure Motorsports	Chevrolet	46.754	76.999
Last car to qualify on time
43	7	Robby Gordon	Robby Gordon Motorsports	Chevrolet	28.032	128.425
Failed to qualify
44	66	Hermie Sadler	Peak Fitness Racing	Ford	28.266	127.362
45	34	Steve Portenga	Mach 1 Racing	Chevrolet	28.349	126.989
46	02	Brandon Ash	Ash Motorsports	Ford	28.275	127.321
Official qualifying results

== Race results ==
Fin	St	#	Driver	Team	Make	Laps	Led	Status	Pts	Winnings
1	2	97	Kurt Busch	Roush Racing	Ford	312	219	running	190	$269,000
2	28	15	Michael Waltrip	Dale Earnhardt, Inc.	Chevrolet	312	23	running	175	$181,939
3	20	31	Jeff Burton	Richard Childress Racing	Chevrolet	312	0	running	165	$147,995
4	15	8	Dale Earnhardt Jr.	Dale Earnhardt, Inc.	Chevrolet	312	0	running	160	$150,018
5	5	25	Brian Vickers	Hendrick Motorsports	Chevrolet	312	50	running	160	$110,325
6	4	18	Bobby Labonte	Joe Gibbs Racing	Chevrolet	312	0	running	150	$121,950
7	11	99	Carl Edwards	Roush Racing	Ford	312	0	running	146	$94,775
8	27	5	Kyle Busch (R)	Hendrick Motorsports	Chevrolet	312	8	running	147	$92,050
9	26	09	Johnny Sauter	Phoenix Racing	Dodge	312	0	running	138	$75,750
10	13	01	Joe Nemechek	MB2 Motorsports	Chevrolet	312	0	running	134	$103,158
11	33	38	Elliott Sadler	Robert Yates Racing	Ford	312	0	running	130	$109,141
12	1	24	Jeff Gordon	Hendrick Motorsports	Chevrolet	312	4	running	132	$120,886
13	8	19	Jeremy Mayfield	Evernham Motorsports	Dodge	312	0	running	124	$98,245
14	7	12	Ryan Newman	Penske-Jasper Racing	Dodge	312	0	running	121	$119,541
15	12	48	Jimmie Johnson	Hendrick Motorsports	Chevrolet	312	0	running	118	$113,066
16	22	6	Mark Martin	Roush Racing	Ford	312	0	running	115	$80,700
17	14	9	Kasey Kahne	Evernham Motorsports	Dodge	312	0	running	112	$98,375
18	16	10	Scott Riggs	MBV Motorsports	Chevrolet	312	1	running	114	$90,133
19	10	29	Kevin Harvick	Richard Childress Racing	Chevrolet	311	0	running	106	$109,011
20	23	0	Mike Bliss	Haas CNC Racing	Chevrolet	311	0	running	103	$67,600
21	37	43	Jeff Green	Petty Enterprises	Dodge	311	0	running	100	$94,261
22	25	33	Clint Bowyer	Richard Childress Racing	Chevrolet	311	0	running	97	$61,700
23	35	88	Dale Jarrett	Robert Yates Racing	Ford	311	0	running	94	$100,083
24	21	07	Dave Blaney	Richard Childress Racing	Chevrolet	311	0	running	91	$72,725
25	34	42	Jamie McMurray	Chip Ganassi Racing	Dodge	311	0	running	88	$72,900
26	31	40	Sterling Marlin	Chip Ganassi Racing	Dodge	311	0	running	85	$92,183
27	42	4	Mike Wallace	Morgan–McClure Motorsports	Chevrolet	310	0	running	82	$64,050
28	29	37	Kevin Lepage	R&J Racing	Dodge	310	0	running	79	$60,925
29	18	11	Jason Leffler	Joe Gibbs Racing	Chevrolet	309	0	running	76	$60,800
30	40	92	Stanton Barrett (R)	Front Row Motorsports	Chevrolet	309	0	running	73	$60,675
31	39	45	Kyle Petty	Petty Enterprises	Dodge	306	0	running	70	$78,208
32	36	22	Scott Wimmer	Bill Davis Racing	Dodge	305	1	running	72	$82,558
33	6	20	Tony Stewart	Joe Gibbs Racing	Chevrolet	305	0	running	64	$109,561
34	38	21	Ricky Rudd	Wood Brothers Racing	Ford	293	0	running	61	$87,364
35	19	32	Bobby Hamilton Jr.	PPI Motorsports	Chevrolet	283	0	running	58	$69,572
36	9	2	Rusty Wallace	Penske-Jasper Racing	Dodge	272	0	running	55	$90,908
37	43	7	Robby Gordon	Robby Gordon Motorsports	Chevrolet	262	0	running	52	$59,750
38	30	49	Ken Schrader	BAM Racing	Dodge	255	4	crash	54	$59,625
39	32	41	Casey Mears	Chip Ganassi Racing	Dodge	243	0	running	46	$67,500
40	24	77	Travis Kvapil (R)	Penske-Jasper Racing	Dodge	237	0	crash	43	$67,350
41	3	16	Greg Biffle	Roush Racing	Ford	172	2	overheating	45	$77,510
42	17	17	Matt Kenseth	Roush Racing	Ford	164	0	crash	37	$107,021
43	41	00	Carl Long	McGlynn Racing	Chevrolet	52	0	engine	34	$58,935
Failed to qualify
44		66	Hermie Sadler	Peak Fitness Racing	Ford					
45		34	Steve Portenga	Mach 1 Racing	Chevrolet					
46		02	Brandon Ash	Ash Motorsports	Ford					
Official race results

Previous race: 2005 Samsung/Radio Shack 500	NASCAR Nextel Cup Series; 2005 season	Next race: 2005 Aaron's 499
