= 2005 Dodge/Save Mart 350 =

Race details
- Race 16 of 36 in the 2005 NASCAR Nextel Cup Series
- The 2005 Dodge/Save Mart 350 program cover.
- Date: June 26, 2005
- Official name: 17th Annual Dodge/Save Mart 350
- Location: Sonoma, California, Infineon Raceway
- Course: Permanent racing facility
- Course length: 1.99 miles (3.203 km)
- Distance: 110 laps, 218.9 mi (352.285 km)
- Scheduled distance: 110 laps, 218.9 mi (352.285 km)
- Average speed: 72.845 miles per hour (117.233 km/h)

Pole position
Driver	Jeff Gordon	Hendrick Motorsports
- Time: 1:15.950

Most laps led
Driver	Tony Stewart	Joe Gibbs Racing
- Laps: 39

Winner
No. 20	Tony Stewart	Joe Gibbs Racing

Television in the United States
- Network: FOX
- Announcers: Mike Joy, Larry McReynolds, Darrell Waltrip

Radio in the United States
- Radio: Performance Racing Network

The 2005 Dodge/Save Mart 350 was the 16th stock car race of the 2005 NASCAR Nextel Cup Series season and the 17th iteration of the event. The race was held on Sunday, June 26, 2005, in Sonoma, California, at the club layout in Infineon Raceway, a 1.99 miles (3.20 km) permanent road course layout. The race took the scheduled 110 laps to complete. At race's end, Tony Stewart of Joe Gibbs Racing would best Ricky Rudd of Wood Brothers Racing, passing him in the closing laps of the race to win his 20th career NASCAR NEXTEL Cup Series race and his first of the season. To fill out the podium, Kurt Busch of Roush Racing would finish third.

== Background ==
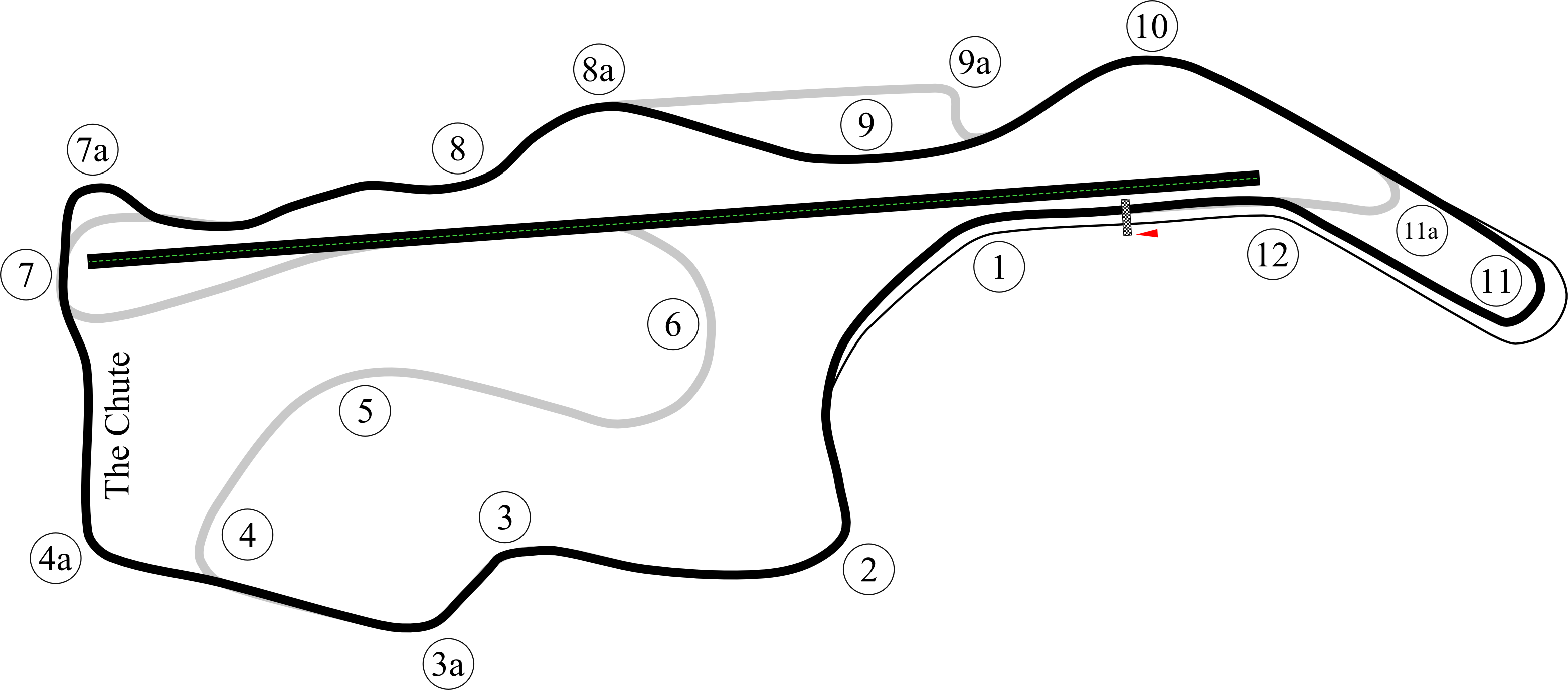
The layout of Infineon Raceway used by NASCAR at the time.

Infineon Raceway is one of two road courses to hold NASCAR races, the other being Watkins Glen International. The standard road course at Infineon Raceway is a 12-turn course that is 2.52 miles (4.06 km) long; the track was modified in 1998, adding the Chute, which bypassed turns 5 and 6, shortening the course to 1.95 miles (3.14 km). The Chute was only used for NASCAR events such as this race, and was criticized by many drivers, who preferred the full layout. In 2001, it was replaced with a 70-degree turn, 4A, bringing the track to its current dimensions of 1.99 miles (3.20 km).

=== Entry list ===
#	Driver	Team	Make	Sponsor
0	Mike Bliss	Haas CNC Racing	Chevrolet	NetZero, Best Buy
01	Joe Nemechek	MB2 Motorsports	Chevrolet	U. S. Army
2	Rusty Wallace	Penske Racing	Dodge	Miller Lite, Snap-on 85th Anniversary
02	Brandon Ash	Ash Motorsports	Ford	Watsonville Auto Body
4	Mike Wallace*	Morgan–McClure Motorsports	Chevrolet	Lucas Oil
5	Kyle Busch	Hendrick Motorsports	Chevrolet	Kellogg's
6	Mark Martin	Roush Racing	Ford	Viagra
7	Robby Gordon	Robby Gordon Motorsports	Chevrolet	Harrah's
07	Dave Blaney	Richard Childress Racing	Chevrolet	Jack Daniel's
8	Dale Earnhardt Jr.	Dale Earnhardt, Inc.	Chevrolet	Budweiser
9	Kasey Kahne	Evernham Motorsports	Dodge	Dodge Dealers, UAW
10	Scott Riggs	MBV Motorsports	Chevrolet	Valvoline
11	Terry Labonte	Joe Gibbs Racing	Chevrolet	FedEx Freight
12	Ryan Newman	Penske Racing	Dodge	Alltel
15	Michael Waltrip	Dale Earnhardt, Inc.	Chevrolet	NAPA Auto Parts
16	Greg Biffle	Roush Racing	Ford	Post-it Notes, U. S. National Guard
17	Matt Kenseth	Roush Racing	Ford	DeWalt
18	Bobby Labonte	Joe Gibbs Racing	Chevrolet	Interstate Batteries
19	Jeremy Mayfield	Evernham Motorsports	Dodge	Dodge Dealers, UAW
20	Tony Stewart	Joe Gibbs Racing	Chevrolet	The Home Depot
21	Ricky Rudd	Wood Brothers Racing	Ford	U. S. Air Force, Motorcraft
22	Scott Wimmer	Bill Davis Racing	Dodge	Caterpillar
24	Jeff Gordon	Hendrick Motorsports	Chevrolet	DuPont
25	Brian Vickers	Hendrick Motorsports	Chevrolet	GMAC, ditech.com
27	Tom Hubert	Kirk Shelmerdine Racing	Ford	Freddie B's, Napa Valley Ford
29	Kevin Harvick	Richard Childress Racing	Chevrolet	GM Goodwrench
31	Jeff Burton	Richard Childress Racing	Chevrolet	Cingular Wireless
32	Ron Fellows	PPI Motorsports	Chevrolet	Tide
33	Brian Simo	Richard Childress Racing	Chevrolet	Korbel California Champagnes
36	Boris Said	MB Sutton Motorsports	Chevrolet	Centrix Financial
37	Kevin Lepage	R&J Racing	Dodge	R&J Racing
38	Elliott Sadler	Robert Yates Racing	Ford	M&M's
39	Scott Pruett	Chip Ganassi Racing with Felix Sabates	Dodge	Texaco, Havoline
40	Sterling Marlin	Chip Ganassi Racing with Felix Sabates	Dodge	Coors Light
41	Casey Mears	Chip Ganassi Racing with Felix Sabates	Dodge	Target
42	Jamie McMurray	Chip Ganassi Racing with Felix Sabates	Dodge	Texaco, Havoline
43	Jeff Green	Petty Enterprises	Dodge	Cheerios, Betty Crocker
45	Kyle Petty	Petty Enterprises	Dodge	Brawny, Georgia-Pacific
48	Jimmie Johnson	Hendrick Motorsports	Chevrolet	Lowe's
49	Ken Schrader	BAM Racing	Dodge	Schwan's Home Service
52	José Luis Ramírez	Rick Ware Racing	Dodge	Pro30.com
66	Johnny Borneman III	Peak Fitness Racing	Ford	Revi Pit Crew Wear
71	P. J. Jones*	Robby Gordon Motorsports	Chevrolet	Harrah's
77	Travis Kvapil	Penske Racing	Dodge	Kodak, Jasper Engines & Transmissions
87	Chris Cook	NEMCO Motorsports	Chevrolet	christinemariemotorsports.com
88	Dale Jarrett	Robert Yates Racing	Ford	UPS, Herbie: Fully Loaded
92	Stanton Barrett	Front Row Motorsports	Chevrolet	Front Row Motorsports
97	Kurt Busch	Roush Racing	Ford	Crown Royal
99	Carl Edwards	Roush Racing	Ford	Office Depot
Official entry list

*The #71 would withdraw for the race. Mike Wallace, originally intended to drive the #4, would be switched to P. J. Jones, originally slated to drive the #71.

== Practice ==
=== First practice ===
The first practice session would take place on Friday, June 24, at 11:20 a.m. PST and would last for an hour Jeff Gordon of Hendrick Motorsports would set the fastest time in the session, with a lap of 1:16.158 and an average speed of 94.068 miles per hour (151.388 km/h).

Pos.	#	Driver	Team	Make	Time	Speed
1	24	Jeff Gordon	Hendrick Motorsports	Chevrolet	1:16.158	94.068
2	36	Boris Said	MB Sutton Motorsports	Chevrolet	1:16.166	94.058
3	7	Robby Gordon	Robby Gordon Motorsports	Chevrolet	1:16.208	94.006
Full first practice results

=== Second practice ===
The second practice session would take place on Saturday, June 25, at 9:30 a.m. PST and would last for 45 minutes. Jeff Gordon of Hendrick Motorsports would set the fastest time in the session, with a lap of 1:16.505 and an average speed of 93.641 miles per hour (150.701 km/h).

Pos.	#	Driver	Team	Make	Time	Speed
1	24	Jeff Gordon	Hendrick Motorsports	Chevrolet	1:16.505	93.641
2	20	Tony Stewart	Joe Gibbs Racing	Chevrolet	1:16.614	93.508
3	36	Boris Said	MB Sutton Motorsports	Chevrolet	1:16.614	93.508
Full second practice results

=== Third and final practice ===
The third and final practice session would take place on Saturday, June 25, at 11:10 a.m. PST and would last for 45 minutes. Tony Stewart of Joe Gibbs Racing would set the fastest time in the session, with a lap of 1:15.937 and an average speed of 94.341 miles per hour (151.827 km/h).

Pos.	#	Driver	Team	Make	Time	Speed
1	20	Tony Stewart	Joe Gibbs Racing	Chevrolet	1:15.937	94.341
2	7	Robby Gordon	Robby Gordon Motorsports	Chevrolet	1:15.975	94.294
3	21	Ricky Rudd	Wood Brothers Racing	Ford	1:16.382	93.792
Full final practice results

== Qualifying ==
Qualifying would take place on Friday, June 24, at 3:10 p.m. PST. Drivers would each have one lap to set a time. Jeff Gordon of Hendrick Motorsports would win the pole and set a new track record, setting a lap of 1:15.950 and an average speed of 94.325 miles per hour (151.801 km/h).

Two drivers would spin during qualifying: first, Elliott Sadler would spin in Turn 10, making him qualify on a provisional. Then, José Luis Ramírez would go off track and spin, causing him to miss the race.

=== Full qualifying results ===
Pos.	#	Driver	Team	Make	Time	Speed
1	24	Jeff Gordon	Hendrick Motorsports	Chevrolet	1:15.950	94.325
2	48	Jimmie Johnson	Hendrick Motorsports	Chevrolet	1:16.079	94.165
3	6	Mark Martin	Roush Racing	Ford	1:16.203	94.012
4	36	Boris Said	MB Sutton Motorsports	Chevrolet	1:16.233	93.975
5	7	Robby Gordon	Robby Gordon Motorsports	Chevrolet	1:16.306	93.885
6	97	Kurt Busch	Roush Racing	Ford	1:16.465	93.690
7	20	Tony Stewart	Joe Gibbs Racing	Chevrolet	1:16.560	93.574
8	11	Terry Labonte	Joe Gibbs Racing	Chevrolet	1:16.788	93.296
9	39	Scott Pruett	Chip Ganassi Racing with Felix Sabates	Dodge	1:16.810	93.269
10	8	Dale Earnhardt Jr.	Dale Earnhardt, Inc.	Chevrolet	1:16.880	93.184
11	12	Ryan Newman	Penske Racing	Dodge	1:16.897	93.164
12	01	Joe Nemechek	MB2 Motorsports	Chevrolet	1:16.907	93.151
13	5	Kyle Busch	Hendrick Motorsports	Chevrolet	1:16.934	93.119
14	2	Rusty Wallace	Penske Racing	Dodge	1:16.938	93.114
15	31	Jeff Burton	Richard Childress Racing	Chevrolet	1:16.990	93.051
16	10	Scott Riggs	MBV Motorsports	Chevrolet	1:17.020	93.015
17	42	Jamie McMurray	Chip Ganassi Racing with Felix Sabates	Dodge	1:17.024	93.010
18	25	Brian Vickers	Hendrick Motorsports	Chevrolet	1:17.045	92.985
19	49	Ken Schrader	BAM Racing	Dodge	1:17.193	92.806
20	21	Ricky Rudd	Wood Brothers Racing	Ford	1:17.211	92.785
21	29	Kevin Harvick	Richard Childress Racing	Chevrolet	1:17.304	92.673
22	33	Brian Simo	Richard Childress Racing	Chevrolet	1:17.325	92.648
23	99	Carl Edwards	Roush Racing	Ford	1:17.396	92.563
24	17	Matt Kenseth	Roush Racing	Ford	1:17.626	92.289
25	45	Kyle Petty	Petty Enterprises	Dodge	1:17.686	92.217
26	9	Kasey Kahne	Evernham Motorsports	Dodge	1:17.716	92.182
27	22	Scott Wimmer	Bill Davis Racing	Dodge	1:17.777	92.109
28	87	Chris Cook	NEMCO Motorsports	Chevrolet	1:17.779	92.107
29	07	Dave Blaney	Richard Childress Racing	Chevrolet	1:17.783	92.102
30	88	Dale Jarrett	Robert Yates Racing	Ford	1:17.856	92.016
31	0	Mike Bliss	Haas CNC Racing	Chevrolet	1:17.896	91.969
32	19	Jeremy Mayfield	Evernham Motorsports	Dodge	1:17.979	91.871
33	18	Bobby Labonte	Joe Gibbs Racing	Chevrolet	1:18.034	91.806
34	15	Michael Waltrip	Dale Earnhardt, Inc.	Chevrolet	1:18.061	91.774
35	27	Tom Hubert	Kirk Shelmerdine Racing	Ford	1:18.123	91.702
36	41	Casey Mears	Chip Ganassi Racing with Felix Sabates	Dodge	1:18.152	91.668
37	40	Sterling Marlin	Chip Ganassi Racing with Felix Sabates	Dodge	1:18.203	91.608
38	43	Jeff Green	Petty Enterprises	Dodge	1:18.404	91.373
39	77	Travis Kvapil	Penske Racing	Dodge	1:18.518	91.240
Provisionals
40	4	P. J. Jones	Morgan–McClure Motorsports	Chevrolet	1:19.461	90.157
41	16	Greg Biffle	Roush Racing	Ford	1:20.245	89.277
42	38	Elliott Sadler	Robert Yates Racing	Ford	2:00.661	59.373
Last car to qualify on time
43	32	Ron Fellows	PPI Motorsports	Chevrolet	1:18.126	91.698
Failed to qualify
44	02	Brandon Ash	Ash Motorsports	Ford	1:18.158	91.660
45	37	Kevin Lepage	R&J Racing	Dodge	1:19:249	90.399
46	92	Stanton Barrett	Front Row Motorsports	Chevrolet	1:19.379	90.251
47	66	Johnny Borneman III	Peak Fitness Racing	Ford	1:20.780	88.685
48	52	José Luis Ramírez	Rick Ware Racing	Dodge	1:35.595	74.941
WD	71	P. J. Jones	Robby Gordon Motorsports	Chevrolet	—	—
Official qualifying results

== Race results ==
Fin	St	#	Driver	Team	Make	Laps	Led	Status	Pts	Winnings
1	7	20	Tony Stewart	Joe Gibbs Racing	Chevrolet	110	39	running	190	$348,761
2	20	21	Ricky Rudd	Wood Brothers Racing	Ford	110	18	running	175	$204,889
3	6	97	Kurt Busch	Roush Racing	Ford	110	0	running	165	$191,750
4	14	2	Rusty Wallace	Penske Racing	Dodge	110	12	running	165	$151,248
5	30	88	Dale Jarrett	Robert Yates Racing	Ford	110	0	running	155	$142,173
6	42	38	Elliott Sadler	Robert Yates Racing	Ford	110	0	running	150	$137,281
7	32	19	Jeremy Mayfield	Evernham Motorsports	Dodge	110	0	running	146	$120,860
8	43	32	Ron Fellows	PPI Motorsports	Chevrolet	110	0	running	142	$107,673
9	11	12	Ryan Newman	Penske Racing	Dodge	110	0	running	138	$137,456
10	22	33	Brian Simo	Richard Childress Racing	Chevrolet	110	0	running	134	$83,085
11	24	17	Matt Kenseth	Roush Racing	Ford	110	0	running	130	$126,561
12	8	11	Terry Labonte	Joe Gibbs Racing	Chevrolet	110	0	running	127	$81,935
13	17	42	Jamie McMurray	Chip Ganassi Racing with Felix Sabates	Dodge	110	0	running	124	$91,375
14	41	16	Greg Biffle	Roush Racing	Ford	110	8	running	126	$93,800
15	3	6	Mark Martin	Roush Racing	Ford	110	0	running	118	$94,900
16	5	7	Robby Gordon	Robby Gordon Motorsports	Chevrolet	110	0	running	115	$78,400
17	4	36	Boris Said	MB Sutton Motorsports	Chevrolet	110	0	running	112	$73,925
18	33	18	Bobby Labonte	Joe Gibbs Racing	Chevrolet	110	0	running	109	$111,450
19	29	07	Dave Blaney	Richard Childress Racing	Chevrolet	110	0	running	106	$84,250
20	36	41	Casey Mears	Chip Ganassi Racing with Felix Sabates	Dodge	110	0	running	103	$103,033
21	39	77	Travis Kvapil	Penske Racing	Dodge	110	0	running	100	$84,475
22	34	15	Michael Waltrip	Dale Earnhardt, Inc.	Chevrolet	110	0	running	97	$101,539
23	12	01	Joe Nemechek	MB2 Motorsports	Chevrolet	110	0	running	94	$96,808
24	16	10	Scott Riggs	MBV Motorsports	Chevrolet	110	0	running	91	$92,688
25	27	22	Scott Wimmer	Bill Davis Racing	Dodge	110	0	running	88	$90,367
26	37	40	Sterling Marlin	Chip Ganassi Racing with Felix Sabates	Dodge	110	0	running	85	$99,708
27	25	45	Kyle Petty	Petty Enterprises	Dodge	110	1	running	87	$71,275
28	28	87	Chris Cook	NEMCO Motorsports	Chevrolet	110	0	running	79	$67,680
29	38	43	Jeff Green	Petty Enterprises	Dodge	110	0	running	76	$99,001
30	15	31	Jeff Burton	Richard Childress Racing	Chevrolet	110	0	running	73	$94,280
31	9	39	Scott Pruett	Chip Ganassi Racing with Felix Sabates	Dodge	110	0	running	70	$67,275
32	40	4	P. J. Jones	Morgan–McClure Motorsports	Chevrolet	110	0	running	67	$67,125
33	1	24	Jeff Gordon	Hendrick Motorsports	Chevrolet	110	32	running	69	$128,201
34	18	25	Brian Vickers	Hendrick Motorsports	Chevrolet	110	0	running	61	$74,905
35	19	49	Ken Schrader	BAM Racing	Dodge	109	0	running	58	$66,795
36	2	48	Jimmie Johnson	Hendrick Motorsports	Chevrolet	109	0	running	55	$116,126
37	21	29	Kevin Harvick	Richard Childress Racing	Chevrolet	109	0	running	52	$113,486
38	23	99	Carl Edwards	Roush Racing	Ford	107	0	running	49	$84,440
39	31	0	Mike Bliss	Haas CNC Racing	Chevrolet	102	0	running	46	$66,325
40	13	5	Kyle Busch	Hendrick Motorsports	Chevrolet	97	0	running	43	$74,200
41	26	9	Kasey Kahne	Evernham Motorsports	Dodge	92	0	running	40	$98,150
42	10	8	Dale Earnhardt Jr.	Dale Earnhardt, Inc.	Chevrolet	88	0	running	37	$113,383
43	35	27	Tom Hubert	Kirk Shelmerdine Racing	Ford	33	0	oil pressure	34	$66,203
Failed to qualify or withdrew
44		02	Brandon Ash	Ash Motorsports	Ford					
45		37	Kevin Lepage	R&J Racing	Dodge					
46		92	Stanton Barrett	Front Row Motorsports	Chevrolet					
47		66	Johnny Borneman III	Peak Fitness Racing	Ford					
48		52	José Luis Ramírez	Rick Ware Racing	Dodge					
WD		71	P. J. Jones	Robby Gordon Motorsports	Chevrolet					
Official race results

Previous race: 2005 Batman Begins 400	NASCAR Nextel Cup Series; 2005 season	Next race: 2005 Pepsi 400
