= 2009 Toyota/Save Mart 350 =

Race details
- Race 16 of 36 in the 2009 NASCAR Sprint Cup Series
- The 2009 Toyota/Save Mart 350 program cover.
- Date: June 21, 2009
- Location: Infineon Raceway, Sonoma, California
- Course: Permanent racing facility
- Course length: 1.99 miles (3.203 km)
- Distance: 113 laps, 224.870 mi (361.893 km)
- Scheduled distance: 110 laps, 218.9 mi (352.285 km)
- Weather: Temperatures reaching as low as 75.9 °F (24.4 °C); wind speeds up to 18.1 miles per hour (29.1 km/h)
- Average speed: 71.012 miles per hour (114.283 km/h)

Pole position
Driver	Brian Vickers	Red Bull Racing
- Time: 76.475

Most laps led
Driver	Kasey Kahne	Richard Petty Motorsports
- Laps: 37

Winner
No. 9	Kasey Kahne	Richard Petty Motorsports

Television in the United States
- Network: TNT
- Announcers: Bill Weber (his last broadcast), Kyle Petty and Wally Dallenbach Jr.

The 2009 Toyota/Save Mart 350 was a NASCAR Sprint Cup Series event held on June 21, 2009 at Infineon Raceway in Sonoma, California. Kasey Kahne picked up his first-ever win on a road course after leading 37 laps, giving car owner Richard Petty his first win as an owner in 10 years. All of Petty's cars finished in the top 10, except for Reed Sorenson, who finished a distant 40th.

Sonoma Raceway, the circuit where the race was held

== Race results ==
Pos	Grid	Car	Driver	Team	Make
1	5	9	Kasey Kahne	Richard Petty Motorsports	Dodge
2	4	14	Tony Stewart	Stewart–Haas Racing	Chevrolet
3	3	47	Marcos Ambrose	JTG Daugherty Racing	Toyota
4	11	48	Jimmie Johnson	Hendrick Motorsports	Chevrolet
5	24	11	Denny Hamlin	Joe Gibbs Racing	Toyota
6	17	42	Juan Pablo Montoya	Earnhardt Ganassi Racing	Chevrolet
7	20	44	A. J. Allmendinger	Richard Petty Motorsports	Dodge
8	26	33	Clint Bowyer	Richard Childress Racing	Chevrolet
9	13	24	Jeff Gordon	Hendrick Motorsports	Chevrolet
10	8	19	Elliott Sadler	Richard Petty Motorsports	Dodge
11	38	55	Patrick Carpentier	Michael Waltrip Racing	Toyota
12	33	13	Max Papis	Germain Racing	Toyota
13	34	99	Carl Edwards	Roush Fenway Racing	Ford
14	23	26	Jamie McMurray	Roush Fenway Racing	Ford
15	27	2	Kurt Busch	Penske Racing	Dodge
16	1	83	Brian Vickers	Red Bull Racing	Toyota
17	7	39	Ryan Newman	Stewart–Haas Racing	Chevrolet
18	10	17	Matt Kenseth	Roush Fenway Racing	Ford
19	12	20	Joey Logano	Joe Gibbs Racing	Toyota
20	25	96	Bobby Labonte	Hall of Fame Racing	Ford
21	30	98	Paul Menard	Yates Racing	Ford
22	2	18	Kyle Busch	Joe Gibbs Racing	Toyota
23	21	07	Casey Mears	Richard Childress Racing	Chevrolet
24	9	08	Boris Said	John Carter Racing	Ford
25	6	1	Martin Truex Jr.	Earnhardt Ganassi Racing	Chevrolet
26	35	88	Dale Earnhardt Jr.	Hendrick Motorsports	Chevrolet
27	29	09	Ron Fellows	Phoenix Racing	Chevrolet
28	15	16	Greg Biffle	Roush Fenway Racing	Ford
29	16	29	Kevin Harvick	Richard Childress Racing	Chevrolet
30	41	34	John Andretti	Front Row Motorsports	Chevrolet
31	42	00	David Reutimann	Michael Waltrip Racing	Toyota
32	32	71	David Gilliland	TRG Motorsports	Chevrolet
33	40	6	David Ragan	Roush Fenway Racing	Ford
34	36	31	Jeff Burton	Richard Childress Racing	Chevrolet
35	14	5	Mark Martin	Hendrick Motorsports	Chevrolet
36	22	7	Robby Gordon	Robby Gordon Motorsports	Toyota
37	31	87	Scott Speed*	NEMCO Motorsports	Toyota
38	18	77	Sam Hornish Jr.	Penske Racing	Dodge
39	39	12	David Stremme	Penske Racing	Dodge
40	28	43	Reed Sorenson	Richard Petty Motorsports	Dodge
41	43	02	Brandon Ash	Ash Motorsports	Dodge
42	19	66	Dave Blaney	Prism Motorsports	Toyota
43	37	04	P. J. Jones	Robby Gordon Motorsports	Toyota

Failed to Qualify: Scott Speed (#82), Tom Hubert (#27), Chris Cook (#37), Brian Simo (#36)

* Scott Speed's team paid Joe Nemechek to let Speed drive his car in the race.

Previous race: 2009 LifeLock 400	Sprint Cup Series; 2009 season	Next race: 2009 Lenox Industrial Tools 301
