= 2010 Toyota/Save Mart 350 =

Race details
- Race 16 of 36 in the 2010 NASCAR Sprint Cup Series
- The 2010 Toyota/Save Mart 350 program cover, featuring Kyle Busch and Jimmie Johnson.
- Date: June 20, 2010
- Official name: Toyota/Save Mart 350
- Location: Infineon Raceway Sonoma, California
- Course: Permanent racing facility
- Course length: 1.99 miles (3.2 km)
- Distance: 110 laps, 218.9 mi (352.285 km)
- Weather: Sunny with a high around 85; wind out of the SW at 13 mph. There was a 10% chance of precipitation.
- Average speed: 74.357 miles per hour (119.666 km/h)

Pole position
Driver	Kasey Kahne	Richard Petty Motorsports
- Time: 1:16.30

Most laps led
Driver	Jimmie Johnson	Hendrick Motorsports
- Laps: 55

Winner
No. 48	Jimmie Johnson	Hendrick Motorsports

Television in the United States
- Network: Turner Network Television
- Announcers: Adam Alexander, Wally Dallenbach Jr. and Kyle Petty

The 2010 Toyota/Save Mart 350 was a NASCAR Sprint Cup Series stock car race held on June 20, 2010, at Infineon Raceway in Sonoma, California. Contested over 110 laps, it was the sixteenth race of the 2010 Sprint Cup Series season and the first of two road course competitions on the schedule. The race was won by Jimmie Johnson, for the Hendrick Motorsports team. Robby Gordon finished second, and Kevin Harvick, who started fourth, clinched third.

Conditions were sunny at the start of the race, making the track potentially slippery. Pole position driver Kasey Kahne maintained his lead into the first corner, but Johnson, who had started in the second position on the grid, took the lead before the first lap was over. Kahne suffered an ill-handling car during the beginning of the race, causing him to fall to seventh by the sixth lap. Seven laps before the finish, race leader Marcos Ambrose, turned his car off to try to save fuel, but he could not refire the engine and subsequently stalled. He dropped back from the lead to sixth place with seven laps remaining, allowing Kahne to finish fourth and Jeff Gordon fifth.

There were eight cautions and twelve lead changes among eight different drivers throughout the course of the race, Johnson's fourth win of the season and his first ever at Infineon. The result moved him up four spots to second in the Drivers' Championship, 140 points behind of leader Kevin Harvick and one ahead of Kyle Busch. Chevrolet maintained its lead in the Manufacturers' Championship, nine points ahead of Toyota and forty-three ahead of Dodge, with twenty races remaining in the season.

== Report ==
The layout of Sonoma Raceway NASCAR used for the race.

=== Background ===
Prior to the race, Kevin Harvick led the Drivers' Championship with 2,169 points, and Kyle Busch stood in second with 2,147 points. Denny Hamlin was third in the Drivers' Championship with 2,122 points in a Toyota, Kyle Busch's brother Kurt was fourth with 2,051 points, and Matt Kenseth was in fifth with 2,019 points. In the Manufacturers' Championship, Chevrolet was leading with 103 points, six points ahead of their rival Toyota, which had been closing the gap between the two teams in the four previous races. Dodge, with 65 points, was tied with Ford in the battle for third.

Two teams chose to temporarily replace their regular drivers with road course ringers. Because of an accident at the previous race in between Scott Speed and Casey Mears, Red Bull Racing Team chose to replace Mears with 2-time DTM champion Mattias Ekström while Phoenix Racing chose Jan Magnussen to replace Landon Cassill.

Infineon Raceway is one of two road courses to hold NASCAR races, the other being Watkins Glen International. The standard road course at Infineon Raceway is a 12-turn course that is 2.52 miles (4.06 km) long; the track was modified in 1998, adding the Chute, which bypassed turns 5 and 6, shortening the course to 1.95 miles (3.14 km). The Chute was only used for NASCAR events such as this race, and was criticized by many drivers, who preferred the full layout. In 2001, it was replaced with a 70-degree turn, 4A, bringing the track to its current dimensions of 1.99 miles (3.20 km).

=== Practice and qualifying ===
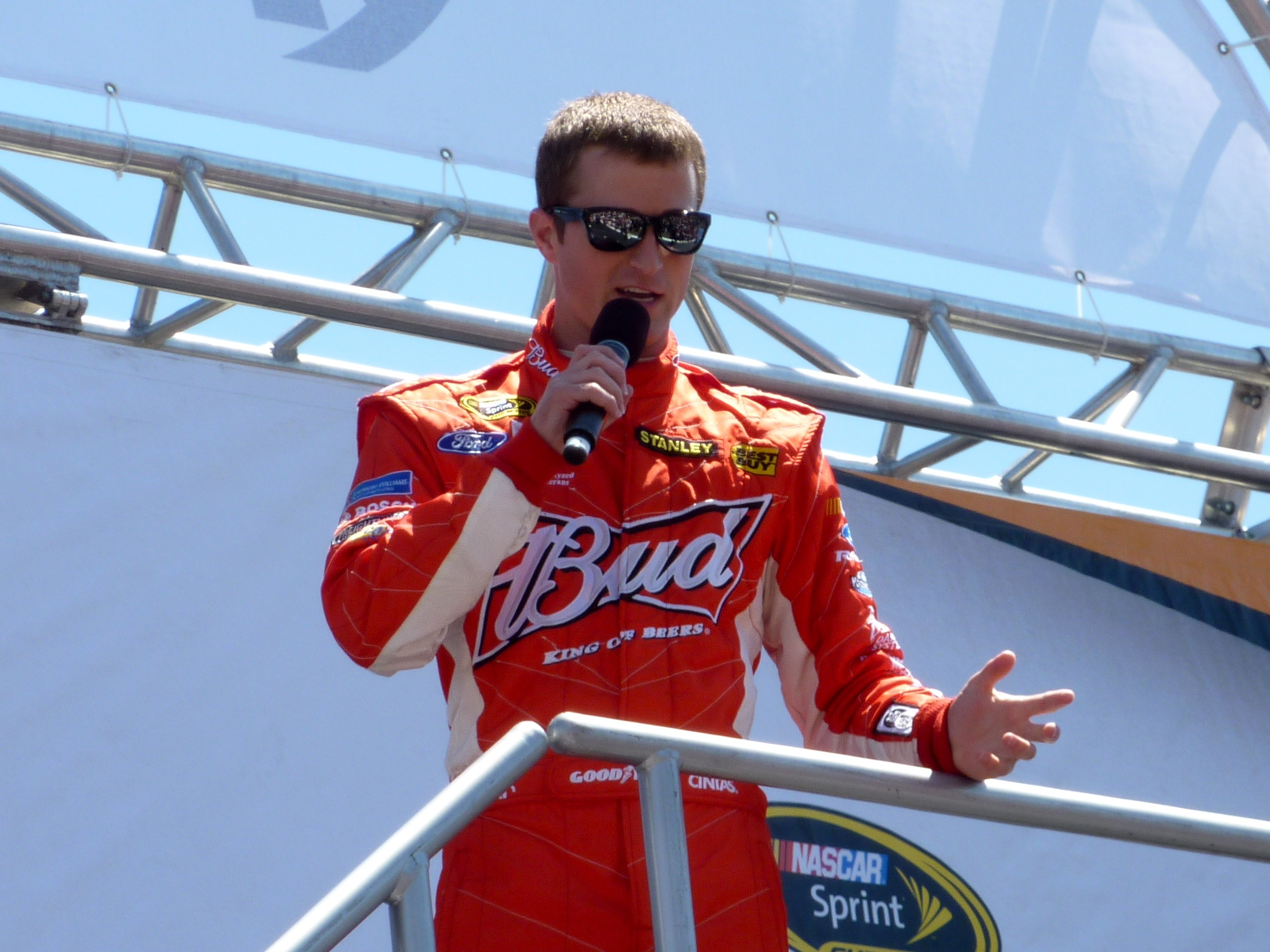
Kasey Kahne scored the pole position for the second time at Infineon Raceway.

Three practice sessions were held before the Sunday race—one on Friday, and two on Saturday. The first session lasted 90 minutes. The Saturday afternoon session lasted 45 minutes, and the evening session lasted 65 minutes. In the first practice session, Marcos Ambrose was the quickest, leading Clint Bowyer, Ryan Newman, Kasey Kahne, and Kevin Harvick, who were in second, third, fourth, and fifth, respectively. In the second practice session, Ambrose was again the fastest with a fastest lap time of 1:16.40, less than seven-tenths of a second quicker than second-placed Jeff Burton. A. J. Allmendinger took third place, ahead of fourth-placed Jimmie Johnson and Martin Truex Jr. There were two cautions in the second session; one of them was caused by Kevin Conway, who stopped on track, and the other was waved for Sam Hornish Jr., who had spun out and collided in the wall. The Saturday evening session was held around the same time of day the race would start. Once more, Ambrose was the quickest, posting a time of 1:16.82, narrowly faster than both McMurray in second and Burton in third. Johnson and Harvick, rounded out the top five positions. Juan Pablo Montoya, who won this race in 2007, only managed twelfth.

During qualifying, forty-six cars were entered, but only forty-three were able to race because of NASCAR's qualifying procedure. Kahne clinched his seventeenth career pole position, with a time of 1:16.30. He was joined on the front row of the grid by Johnson. Kurt Busch qualified third, Harvick took fourth, and Jeff Gordon started fifth, after being quickest earlier in the session. The three drivers that did not qualify were Brian Simo, Brandon Ash, and Michael Waltrip.

=== Race ===
The race, the sixteenth out of a total of thirty-six in the season, began at 3 pm EDT and was televised live in the United States on TNT. Conditions were sunny with a high of 80 °F (27 °C), making the track potentially slippery. Infineon Raceway volunteer coordinator Tim Boeve began the pre-race ceremonies by giving the invocation. Next, CNN news anchor Robin Meade performed the national anthem, and former NFL running back Roger Craig and Northern California Toyota Dealer Association's Henry Hansel gave the command for drivers to start their engines. On the pace laps, Sam Hornish Jr. and David Ragan had to go to the rear of the starting grid because they switched to back-up cars due to accidents during practice and qualifying.

Kasey Kahne held the lead going through the first corner with Jimmie Johnson behind him. Going through turn seven, Kurt Busch went three-wide with Kahne and Johnson for the lead, and Kahne slowed as Johnson claimed the lead. Kahne's vacated third position was filled by Kevin Harvick. Marcos Ambrose moved into fifth, passing Jeff Gordon on the sixth lap. After starting in the pole position, Kahne lost six positions in the first seven laps. Johnson continued to increase his lead over Kurt Busch to 3.17 seconds. On lap 11, the first caution flag was waved for an accident involving Clint Bowyer, A. J. Allmendinger, Kyle Busch, and Jamie McMurray. Four laps later, some teams decided to pit as Kyle Busch went to the garage for repairs. Johnson made a good restart, retaining the first position as Ambrose passed Kurt Busch for the second position.

Tony Stewart also improved his position by passing Harvick for fourth when McMurray spun out on the restart. Johnson built a lead of one second over Ambrose within two laps of the restart. On lap 17, Jeff Gordon improved his position to sixth after passing Martin Truex Jr., and Johnson continued to pull away with a three-second lead after lap 21. On lap 23, Denny Hamlin reported that he was struggling due to damage on the hood of his race car. A lap later, Biffle passed Ryan Newman for ninth while Jeff Gordon emerged in third after passing Juan Pablo Montoya and Kurt Busch. On lap 27, green flag pit stops began when Ambrose came to pit road for fuel and four new tires. A few laps later, Bobby Labonte received a drive-through penalty for exiting pit road too fast.

On lap 35, Johnson went to pit road and received four new tires and fuel, allowing Stewart to claim the lead. Debutant Mattias Ekström gained the lead as Stewart went to pit lane. On lap 44, Hamlin continued to have trouble; his hood began to cover his windshield under green flag conditions. Johnson soon built a 1.58 second lead over second place Ambrose. Hamlin was then given a drive-through penalty for speeding on pit road. On lap 52, Ambrose made a pit stop because of his team's three pit stop strategy.

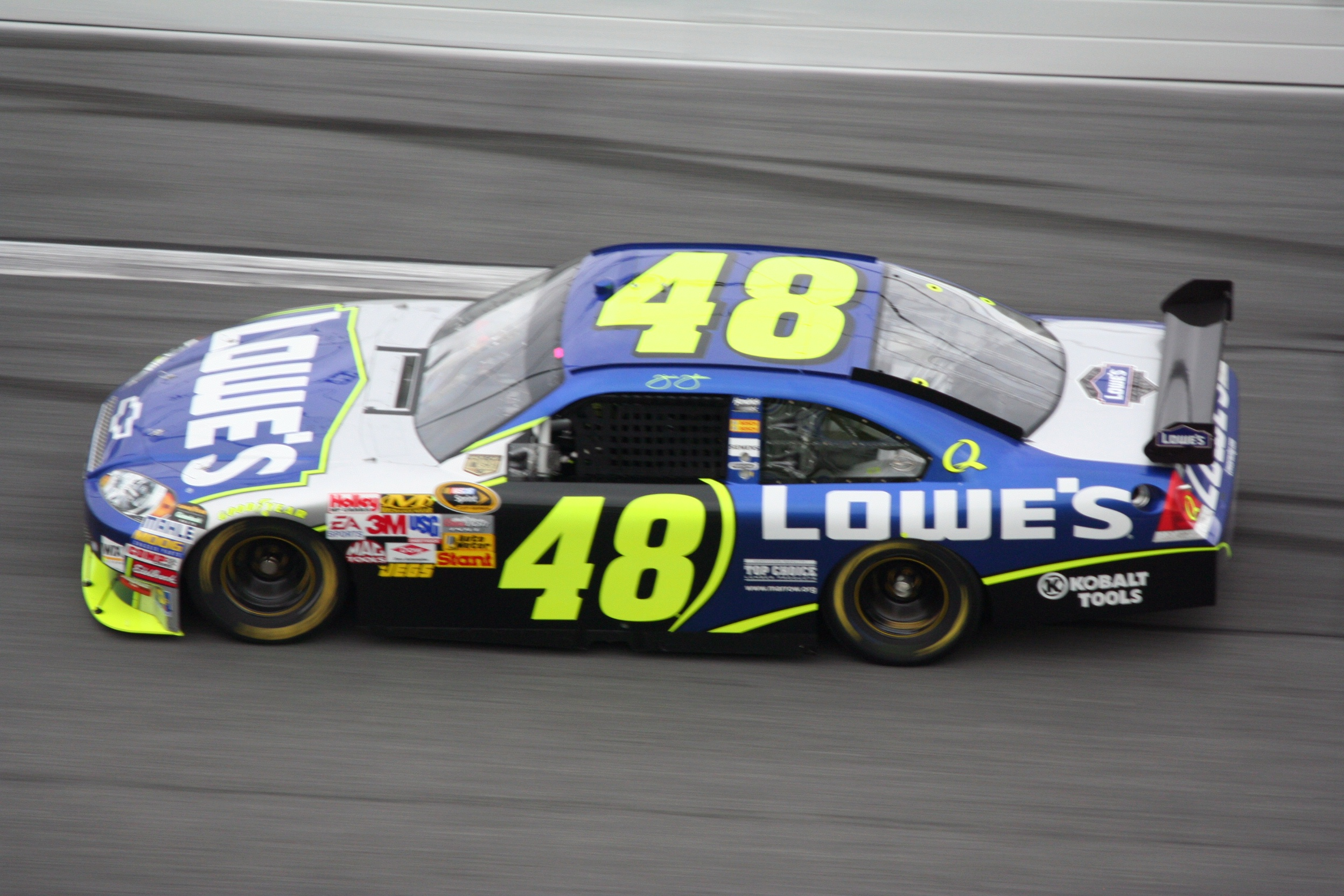
Jimmie Johnson led the most laps and won the race.

Johnson's lead—13 seconds over Truex Jr. by lap 54—was reduced to nothing when the safety car was deployed on the fifty-eighth lap. Dave Blaney had spun out and his car stopped in the middle of the track. After pit stops were completed, the top five positions were filled by Boris Said in first, Stewart in second, Ambrose in third, Ekström in fourth, and David Ragan in fifth. Said made a good restart, but because of his older tires, Ambrose passed him. One lap later, Johnson had already passed four cars and was in the third position when Truex Jr. spun going through turn eleven. The third caution flag was waved because Brad Keselowski turned sideways at turn ten; he had major damage to the splitter from going through the dirt off the track. Said made a slow restart, making cars collide with each other, prompting a red flag on lap 67.

After twenty-two minutes, drivers restarted their engines as cleanup crews were still working. Ambrose made a good restart on lap 70 to keep Johnson behind him. Six laps later, Stewart went to pit lane as Johnson was catching Ambrose. On lap 79, Johnson went to pit lane for fuel and four new tires; he was scored in seventeenth afterward. On the following lap, Ambrose went to pit lane for new tires and fuel, so Bowyer became the leader. Elliott Sadler and Boris Said both held the lead during the pit stops. The fifth caution flag came out on lap 85 because Montoya and Joey Logano collided. Boris Said led the field on the restart, but he went off track in turn two and fell to the fifth position as Ambrose, Johnson, Robby Gordon and Biffle passed him. Shortly after the restart, the sixth caution came out because Ekström and David Gilliland both spun out. Ambrose made a good restart to maintain the first position, while Johnson defended second.

On lap 100, Bowyer and Sadler both spun sideways because Jeff Gordon collided with them. Three laps later, the seventh caution came out because Keselowski had fluid coming out of his race car after being spun around by Gilliland. Under caution, Ambrose in the first turn stopped his car to save fuel in case of green-white-checkered finishes and came to a stop going up a hill; he lost six positions and went back to the lead under caution thinking that that was where he was to be on the restart. However NASCAR ruled soon afterwards that Ambrose failed to maintain any speed under caution by stalling his car and ordered Ambrose to go back to 7th place on the restart costing Ambrose a chance at his first NSCS victory. Ambrose obeyed and slowed his lead to 7th place and Johnson restarted well to take the lead from Robby Gordon. On the final lap (110), Matt Kenseth spun and collided with the tire barriers after his brakes failed. Johnson crossed the finish line in first to take his fourth win of the season and his first ever at a road course. Robby Gordon followed in second, ahead of Harvick in third, Kahne in fourth, and Jeff Gordon in fifth. The race had a total of eight cautions and twelve lead changes among eight different drivers.

=== Post-race ===
"My bad, I'm disappointed. It's NASCAR's house and I'll always play by the rules. I don't agree with it, I don't like it and that's only because I lost the race because of it. I had the motor turned off trying to save a bit of fuel and just had trouble getting it fired again. That's it."

— Marcos Ambrose, speaking after the race.

Jimmie Johnson appeared in victory lane after his victory lap to start celebrating his fourth win of the season, and his first on a road course. Before the race, he had stated, “I have a lot of confidence but at the same time, after eight years of trying, I’m hopeful we have overturned a stone that we have missed in the past. I don’t think we have forgotten any area or missed something, but we’ll go out and give it a shot and see what we can do and I am ready mentally, physically and we did some testing. I think we found a couple of small things that will bring speed to the cars.” Following his win, he added, "This win is important, but it’s not what it’s going to take to win a championship."

Although Marcos Ambrose was leading near the end of the race, he stalled his car while going uphill when coasting in order to conserve fuel. NASCAR ruled that he had failed to maintain reasonable speed under the caution which caused him to drop to seventh. In the subsequent press conference, Johnson said, "I feel bad for him. It was definitely a gift kind of handed to us." Johnson expressed his enjoyment of winning the race, but he also stated:

"Normally, you shut off the car downhill to save fuel. I don’t think you do that going up the hill—that’s the last place to do it. I thought he was out of fuel, or it was electrical. His car came to a stop and I just thought, ‘Wow.’ I know he is kicking himself for whatever happened there. It’s the last type of mistake I would expect to see. I was just hoping that I could stay alongside of him. You can count on some guys making mistakes, but I didn’t think Marcos would make one. To see him make that was totally off the wall."

Martin Truex Jr. was furious because of the accident involving himself and Jeff Gordon. Gordon apologized for the collision, but Truex vowed, "We’ll get him." From a second-place finish, Robby Gordon said, "My team needs a little bit of morale here and there. This will be a morale boost back at the workshop." The race result left Kevin Harvick leading the Driver's Championship with 2,334 points. Johnson, who failed to finish three of the past six races, was second on 2,194, one point ahead of Kyle Busch and eleven ahead of Denny Hamlin. Jeff Gordon was fifth with 2,142 points. In the Manufacturers' Championship, Chevrolet maintained their lead with 112 points. Toyota remained second with 103 points. Ford followed with 69 points, one point ahead of Dodge in fourth. The race took two hours, fifty-six minutes and thirty-eight seconds to complete, and the margin of victory was 3.105 seconds.

== Results ==
=== Qualifying ===
Grid	Car	Driver	Team	Manufacturer	Time
1	9	Kasey Kahne	Richard Petty Motorsports	Ford	1:16.30
2	48	Jimmie Johnson	Hendrick Motorsports	Chevrolet	1:16.37
3	2	Kurt Busch	Penske Racing	Dodge	1:16.56
4	29	Kevin Harvick	Richard Childress Racing	Chevrolet	1:16.67
5	24	Jeff Gordon	Hendrick Motorsports	Chevrolet	1:16.69
6	47	Marcos Ambrose	JTG Daugherty Racing	Toyota	1:16.80
7	14	Tony Stewart	Stewart Haas Racing	Chevrolet	1:16.81
8	71	Bobby Labonte	TRG Motorsports	Chevrolet	1:16.82
9	16	Greg Biffle	Roush Fenway Racing	Ford	1:16.84
10	56	Martin Truex Jr.	Michael Waltrip Racing	Toyota	1:16.87
11	5	Mark Martin	Hendrick Motorsports	Chevrolet	1:16.89
12	11	Denny Hamlin	Joe Gibbs Racing	Toyota	1:16.90
13	39	Ryan Newman	Stewart Haas Racing	Chevrolet	1:16.90
14	42	Juan Montoya	Earnhardt Ganassi Racing	Chevrolet	1:16.91
15	43	A. J. Allmendinger	Richard Petty Motorsports	Ford	1:16.98
16	7	Robby Gordon	Robby Gordon Motorsports	Toyota	1:17.05
17	26	Boris Said	Latitude 43 Motorsports	Ford	1:17.09
18	98	Paul Menard	Richard Petty Motorsports	Ford	1:17.13
19	99	Carl Edwards	Roush Fenway Racing	Ford	1:17.16
20	20	Joey Logano	Joe Gibbs Racing	Toyota	1:17.17
21	19	Elliott Sadler	Richard Petty Motorsports	Ford	1:17.21
22	33	Clint Bowyer	Richard Childress Racing	Chevrolet	1:17.30
23	82	Scott Speed	Red Bull Racing	Toyota	1:17.35
24	88	Dale Earnhardt Jr.	Hendrick Motorsports	Chevrolet	1:17.38
25	1	Jamie McMurray	Earnhardt Ganassi Racing	Chevrolet	1:17.46
26	38	David Gilliland	Front Row Motorsports	Ford	1:17.51
27	18	Kyle Busch	Joe Gibbs Racing	Toyota	1:17.53
28	87	Joe Nemechek	NEMCO Motorsports	Toyota	1:17.54
29	13	Max Papis	Germain Racing	Toyota	1:17.55
30	31	Jeff Burton	Richard Childress Racing	Chevrolet	1:17.62
31	78	Regan Smith	Furniture Row Racing	Chevrolet	1:17.69
32	09	Jan Magnussen	Phoenix Racing	Chevrolet	1:17.71
33	00	David Reutimann	Michael Waltrip Racing	Toyota	1:17.86
34	17	Matt Kenseth	Roush Fenway Racing	Ford	1:17.87
35	07	P. J. Jones	Robby Gordon Motorsports	Toyota	1:17.89
36	12	Brad Keselowski	Penske Racing	Dodge	1:17.91
37	46	J. J. Yeley	Whitney Motorsports	Dodge	1:17.99
38	83	Mattias Ekstrom	Red Bull Racing	Toyota	1:18.03
39	77	Sam Hornish Jr.	Penske Racing	Dodge	1:18.31
40	37	Travis Kvapil	Front Row Motorsports	Ford	1:18.74
41	34	Kevin Conway	Front Row Motorsports	Ford	1:18.81
42	6	David Ragan	Roush Fenway Racing	Ford	N/A
43	66	Dave Blaney	Prism Motorsports	Toyota	1:18.85
	02	Brandon Ash	Ash Motorsports	Dodge	1:18.92
	36	Brian Simo	Front Row Motorsports	Ford	1:18.93
	55	Michael Waltrip	Prism Motorsports	Toyota	1:19.44

=== Race ===
Pos	Grid	Car	Driver	Team	Manufacturer	Laps	Points
1	2	48	Jimmie Johnson	Hendrick Motorsports	Chevrolet	110	195^{2}
2	16	7	Robby Gordon	Robby Gordon Motorsports	Toyota	110	170
3	4	29	Kevin Harvick	Richard Childress Racing	Chevrolet	110	165
4	1	9	Kasey Kahne	Richard Petty Motorsports	Ford	110	160
5	5	24	Jeff Gordon	Hendrick Motorsports	Chevrolet	110	155
6	6	47	Marcos Ambrose	JTG Daugherty Racing	Toyota	110	155^{1}
7	9	16	Greg Biffle	Roush Fenway Racing	Ford	110	146
8	17	26	Boris Said	Latitude 43 Motorsports	Ford	110	147^{1}
9	7	14	Tony Stewart	Stewart Haas Racing	Chevrolet	110	143^{1}
10	14	42	Juan Pablo Montoya	Earnhardt Ganassi Racing	Chevrolet	110	134
11	24	88	Dale Earnhardt Jr.	Hendrick Motorsports	Chevrolet	110	130
12	32	09	Jan Magnussen	Phoenix Racing	Chevrolet	110	127
13	15	43	A. J. Allmendinger	Richard Petty Motorsports	Ford	110	124
14	11	5	Mark Martin	Hendrick Motorsports	Chevrolet	110	121
15	25	1	Jamie McMurray	Earnhardt Ganassi Racing	Chevrolet	110	118
16	13	39	Ryan Newman	Stewart Haas Racing	Chevrolet	110	115
17	21	19	Elliott Sadler	Richard Petty Motorsports	Ford	110	117^{1}
18	23	82	Scott Speed	Red Bull Racing Team	Toyota	110	109
19	26	38	David Gilliland	Front Row Motorsports	Ford	110	106
20	33	00	David Reutimann	Michael Waltrip Racing	Toyota	110	103
21	38	83	Mattias Ekström	Red Bull Racing Team	Toyota	110	105^{1}
22	18	98	Paul Menard	Richard Petty Motorsports	Ford	110	97
23	8	71	Bobby Labonte	TRG Motorsports	Chevrolet	110	94
24	40	37	Travis Kvapil	Front Row Motorsports	Ford	110	91
25	42	6	David Ragan	Roush Fenway Racing	Ford	110	88
26	37	46	J. J. Yeley	Whitney Motorsports	Dodge	110	85
27	30	31	Jeff Burton	Richard Childress Racing	Chevrolet	110	82
28	41	34	Kevin Conway	Front Row Motorsports	Ford	110	79
29	19	99	Carl Edwards	Roush Fenway Racing	Ford	110	76
30	34	17	Matt Kenseth	Roush Fenway Racing	Ford	110	73
31	22	33	Clint Bowyer	Richard Childress Racing	Chevrolet	110	75^{1}
32	3	2	Kurt Busch	Penske Racing	Dodge	110	67
33	20	20	Joey Logano	Joe Gibbs Racing	Toyota	108	64
34	12	11	Denny Hamlin	Joe Gibbs Racing	Toyota	103	61
35	36	12	Brad Keselowski	Penske Racing	Dodge	102	58
36	39	77	Sam Hornish Jr.	Penske Racing	Dodge	93	55
37	43	66	Dave Blaney	Prism Motorsports	Toyota	86	52
38	31	78	Regan Smith	Furniture Row Racing	Chevrolet	86	49
39	27	18	Kyle Busch	Joe Gibbs Racing	Toyota	76	46
40	28	87	Joe Nemechek	NEMCO Motorsports	Toyota	71	43
41	35	07	P. J. Jones	Robby Gordon Motorsports	Toyota	68	40
42	10	56	Martin Truex Jr.	Michael Waltrip Racing	Toyota	66	42^{1}
43	29	13	Max Papis	Germain Racing	Toyota	65	34
^{1} Includes five bonus points for leading a lap
^{2} Includes ten bonus points for leading the most laps

== Standings after the race ==
Drivers' Championship standings

Pos	Driver	Points
1	Kevin Harvick	2,334
2	Jimmie Johnson	2,194
3	Kyle Busch	2,195
4	Denny Hamlin	2,183
5	Jeff Gordon	2,142

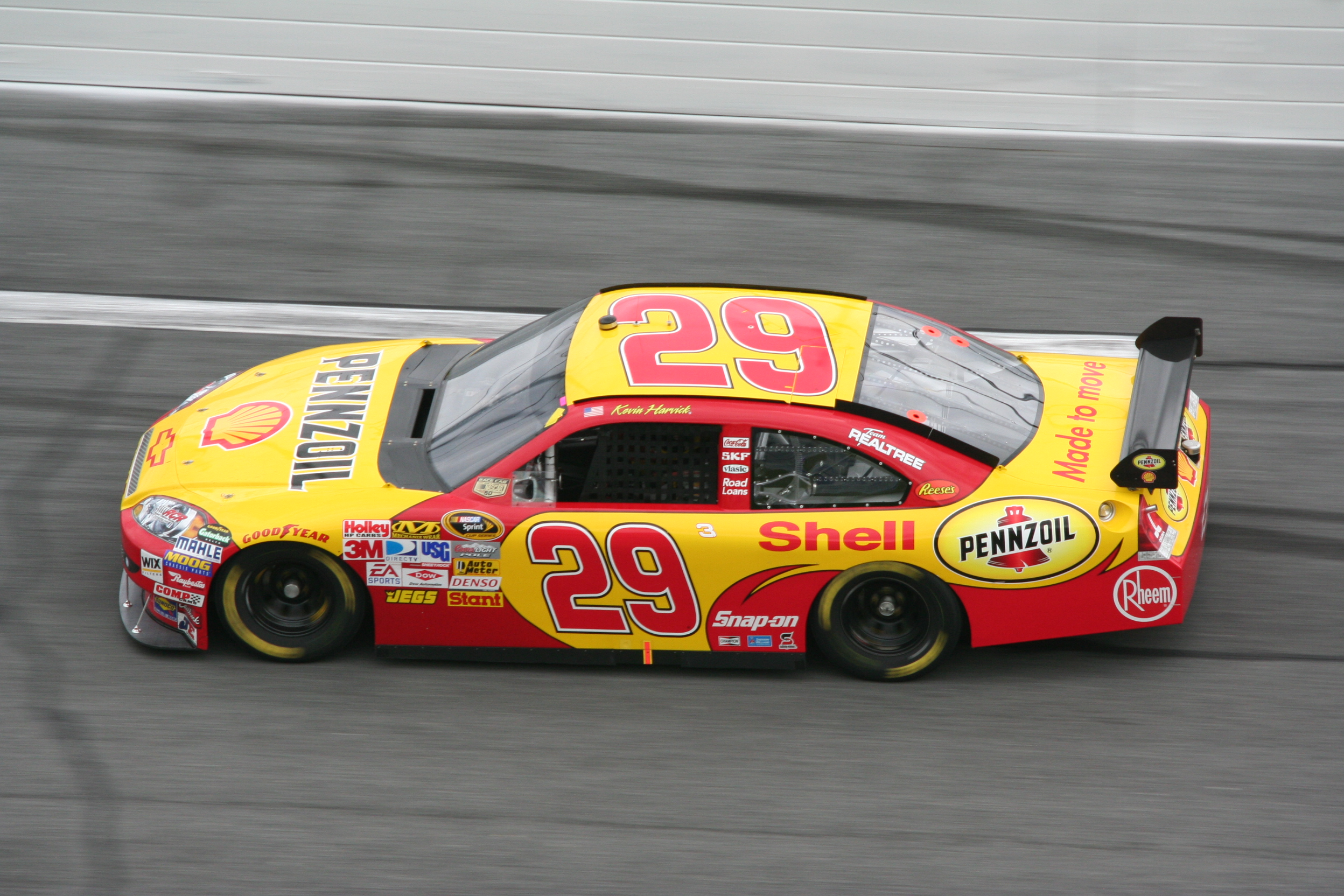
Kevin Harvick remained the Drivers' Championship leader after finishing third in the race.

Manufacturers' Championship standings

Pos	Manufacturer	Points
1	Chevrolet	112
2	Toyota	103
3	Ford	69
4	Dodge	70

- Note: Only the top five positions are included for both sets of standings.

Previous race: 2010 Heluva Good! Sour Cream Dips 400	Sprint Cup Series; 2010 season	Next race: 2010 Lenox Industrial Tools 301
