= 2009 Checker O'Reilly Auto Parts 500 =

Race details
- Race 35 of 36 in the 2009 NASCAR Sprint Cup Series
- Official logo of the race
- Date: November 15, 2009
- Official name: Checker O'Reilly Auto Parts 500
- Location: Phoenix International Raceway, Avondale, Arizona
- Course: Permanent racing facility
- Course length: 1.000 miles (1.609 km)
- Distance: 312 laps, 312 mi (502.115 km)
- Weather: Temperatures reaching up to 68 °F (20 °C); wind speeds up to 9.9 miles per hour (15.9 km/h)
- Average speed: 110.486 miles per hour (177.810 km/h)

Pole position
Driver	Martin Truex Jr.	Dale Earnhardt Inc.
- Time: 26.643

Most laps led
Driver	Jimmie Johnson	Hendrick Motorsports
- Laps: 238

Winner
No. 48	Jimmie Johnson	Hendrick Motorsports

Television in the United States
- Network: ESPN
- Announcers: Jerry Punch, Dale Jarrett, and Andy Petree
- Nielsen ratings: 3.6/6 (Final); 2.9/6 (Overnight); (5.17 million)

The 2009 Checker O'Reilly Auto Parts 500 was the thirty-fifth and penultimate stock car race of the 2009 NASCAR Sprint Cup Series and the ninth in the ten-race season-ending Chase for the Sprint Cup. It was held on November 15, 2009, at Phoenix International Raceway, in Avondale, Arizona before a crowd of 90,000. The 312-lap race was won by Jimmie Johnson of the Hendrick Motorsports team after starting from third position. Richard Childress Racing's Jeff Burton finished second and Denny Hamlin of Joe Gibbs Racing placed third.

Entering the race, only Hendrick Motorsports teammates Johnson, Mark Martin and Jeff Gordon remained in contention for the Drivers' Championship, with Johnson holding a 73-point margin over Martin in second. Martin Truex Jr. started from pole position by setting the fastest lap in the qualifying session, although he was passed by Kurt Busch by the end of the first lap. Fifty-six laps later, Johnson became the leader of the race. Many Chase for the Sprint Cup participants, including Gordon and Martin ran in the top ten for most of the race. Johnson maintained the first position to lead the most laps of 238, and to win his seventh race of the season. There were four cautions and nine lead changes among four different drivers during the course of the race.

The event saw Johnson claim his seventh race victory of the 2009 season, and the forty-seventh of his career. The result kept Johnson in the lead of the Drivers' Championship, one-hundred and eight points ahead of Martin and one-hundred and sixty nine in front of Gordon. Chevrolet maintained their lead in the Manufacturers' Championship, fifty-eight ahead of Toyota, ninety-five in front of Ford and one-hundred and eight ahead of Dodge. The race attracted 5.17 million television viewers.

== Background ==
Phoenix International Raceway, where the race was held.

The 2009 Checker O'Reilly Auto Parts 500 was the thirty-fifth of thirty-six scheduled stock car races of the 2009 NASCAR Sprint Cup Series and the ninth in the ten race season-ending Chase for the Sprint Cup. It took place on November 15, 2009, in Avondale, Arizona, at Phoenix International Raceway, a short track that holds NASCAR races. The standard track at Phoenix International Raceway is a four-turn short track oval that is 1 mile (1.6 km) long. The track's turns are banked at eleven degrees, while the front stretch, the location of the finish line, was banked at three degrees. The back stretch, which has a dogleg shape instead of a straight, has nine degrees of banking.

Before the race, Jimmie Johnson led the Drivers' Championship with 6,297 points, and Mark Martin stood in second with 6,224 points. Jeff Gordon followed in third with 6,185 points, fifty-nine ahead of Kurt Busch, and ninety-eight in front of Tony Stewart in fourth and fifth. Juan Pablo Montoya with 6,061 was eleven points ahead of Greg Biffle, as Denny Hamlin with 5,975 points, was two ahead of Ryan Newman, and seventy-seven in front of Kasey Kahne. Carl Edwards and Brian Vickers in eleventh and twelfth with 5,857 and 5,777 points rounded out the contenders for the Chase for the Sprint Cup. Johnson had to attain 122 more points than Martin to be leading the championship standings by 195 points and become the Drivers' Champion at Phoenix. In the Manufacturers' Championship, Chevrolet were leading with 247 points, fifty-five ahead of their rival Toyota. Ford, with 158 points, were seven points ahead of Dodge in the battle for third. Johnson was the race's defending champion.

At the previous race at Texas Motor Speedway, the Dickies 500, the gap between Johnson and his teammate Martin was reduced by 111 points to 73 points. Johnson came 38th after becoming involved in a three-car accident three laps into the event while Martin finished fourth. For his part, Johnson remained confident about his chances of winning the title, "We still have a nice lead and we'll take it from here... We're still in a great position and we'll go to Phoenix and race." He deemed his 73-point advantage to be "very, very healthy" and noted that Martin could be affected by problems at Phoenix. Martin said he would not change his strategy of attempting to secure victory in his bid to win his first championship, adding, "We aren't in control of anything else that happens. I've said all along that you can't make predictions, and I still say that it's not over." He added that he concentrated on the race at Phoenix and not on scoring points.

== Practice and qualifying ==
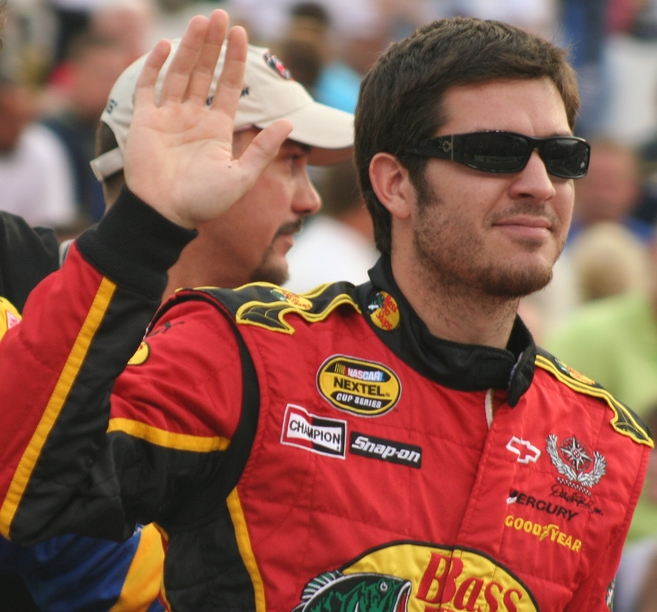
Martin Truex Jr. who won pole position with the fastest time, 26.643.

Two practice sessions were held before the Sunday race—both on Saturday. A practice session scheduled for Friday morning was cancelled because of rain. The first session lasted 45 minutes, and the second and final session lasted 60 minutes.

Forty-six drivers were entered in the qualifier on Friday evening; according to NASCAR's qualifying procedure, forty-three were allowed to race. Each driver ran two laps, with the starting order determined by the competitor's fastest times. A majority of drivers recorded their fastest laps during their second timed lap. Martin Truex Jr. clinched his third pole position of the season and the fourth of his career at his first attempt to set a time, with a lap of 26.643 seconds. He was joined on the grid's front row by Kurt Busch. Johnson qualified third, Kahne took fourth after he had held pole position earlier in the session, and Hamlin started fifth. Biffle, Kyle Busch, Stewart, Casey Mears and Martin completed the top ten positions. The three drivers that failed to qualify were Regan Smith, Kevin Conway and Brandon Ash. After the qualifier Truex said, "(Today) we were pretty good in practice. This is a weird track where you go out in practice, then expect to pick up a half-second somehow (in qualifying). We did. It's strange, but it felt good."

In the first practice session, Sam Hornish Jr. was fastest with a lap of 26.889 seconds, finishing ahead of Kahne in second, and Kyle Busch in third. Biffle was fourth fastest, and Hamlin placed fifth. Montoya, Johnson, Martin, Stewart and Gordon rounded out the top ten fastest drivers in the session. Of the other drivers in the chase, Vickers was fifteenth fastest, while Newman placed seventeenth. Later that day, Johnson was fastest in the second and final practice session with a time of 27.201 seconds, ahead of Martin in second, and Dale Earnhardt Jr. in third. Truex was fourth quickest, and Kurt Busch took fifth. Jeff Burton managed sixth. Gordon, Jamie McMurray, Joey Logano and Kahne followed in the top ten. Other chase drivers included Montoya in seventeenth and Edwards in twenty-third. Kahne scraped the turn two wall and sustained minor damage to the right-hand quarter of his car.

=== Qualifying results ===
Grid	Car	Driver	Team	Manufacturer	Time	Speed
1	1	Martin Truex Jr.	Earnhardt Ganassi Racing	Chevrolet	26.643	135.120
2	2	Kurt Busch	Penske Championship Racing	Dodge	26.750	134.579
3	48	Jimmie Johnson	Hendrick Motorsports	Chevrolet	26.775	134.454
4	9	Kasey Kahne	Richard Petty Motorsports	Dodge	26.807	134.293
5	11	Denny Hamlin	Joe Gibbs Racing	Toyota	26.820	134.228
6	16	Greg Biffle	Roush Fenway Racing	Ford	26.821	134.223
7	18	Kyle Busch	Joe Gibbs Racing	Toyota	26.831	134.173
8	14	Tony Stewart	Stewart–Haas Racing	Chevrolet	26.850	134.078
9	07	Casey Mears	Richard Childress Racing	Chevrolet	26.860	134.028
10	5	Mark Martin	Hendrick Motorsports	Chevrolet	26.861	134.023
11	55	Michael Waltrip	Michael Waltrip Racing	Toyota	26.876	133.949
12	77	Sam Hornish Jr.	Team Penske	Dodge	26.881	133.924
13	33	Clint Bowyer	Richard Childress Racing	Chevrolet	26.890	133.879
14	24	Jeff Gordon	Hendrick Motorsports	Chevrolet	26.891	133.874
15	00	David Reutimann	Michael Waltrip Racing	Toyota	26.893	133.864
16	44	A. J. Allmendinger	Richard Petty Motorsports	Ford	26.914	133.759
17	42	Juan Pablo Montoya	Earnhardt Ganassi Racing	Chevrolet	26.922	133.720
18	88	Dale Earnhardt Jr.	Hendrick Motorsports	Chevrolet	26.926	133.700
19	83	Brian Vickers	Red Bull Racing Team	Toyota	26.930	133.680
20	71	Bobby Labonte	TRG Motorsports	Chevrolet	26.952	133.571
21	47	Marcos Ambrose	JTG Daugherty Racing	Toyota	26.956	133.551
22	7	Robby Gordon	Robby Gordon Motorsports	Toyota	26.983	133.417
23	13	Max Papis	Germain Racing	Toyota	26.986	133.402
24	39	Ryan Newman	Stewart–Haas Racing	Chevrolet	27.019	133.240
25	99	Carl Edwards	Roush Fenway Racing	Ford	27.024	133.215
26	12	Brad Keselowski	Penske Championship Racing	Dodge	27.035	133.161
27	20	Joey Logano	Joe Gibbs Racing	Chevrolet	27.037	133.151
28	17	Matt Kenseth	Roush Fenway Racing	Ford	27.043	133.121
29	09	David Gilliland	Joe Gibbs Racing	Chevrolet	27.050	133.087
30	26	Jamie McMurray	Roush Fenway Racing	Ford	27.055	133.062
31	29	Kevin Harvick	Richard Childress Racing	Chevrolet	27.082	132.930
32	66	Dave Blaney	Prism Motorsports	Toyota	27.083	132.925
33	6	David Ragan	Roush Fenway Racing	Ford	27.106	132.812
34	87	Joe Nemechek	NEMCO Motorsports	Toyota	27.112	132.783
35	19	Elliott Sadler	Richard Petty Motorsports	Dodge	27.116	132.763
36	31	Jeff Burton	Richard Childress Racing	Chevrolet	27.139	132.650
37	82	Scott Speed	Red Bull Racing Team	Toyota	27.204	132.333
38	36	Michael McDowell	Tommy Baldwin Racing	Toyota	27.216	132.276
39	96	Erik Darnell	Hall of Fame Racing	Ford	27.236	132.178
40	43	Reed Sorenson	Richard Petty Motorsports	Dodge	27.308	131.829
41	98	Paul Menard	Robert Yates Racing	Ford	27.402	131.377
42	34	John Andretti	Front Row Motorsports	Chevrolet	27.532	130.757
43	37	Tony Raines	Front Row Motorsports	Chevrolet	27.254	132.091
Failed to qualify
44	78	Regan Smith	Furniture Row Racing	Chevrolet	27.260	132.062
45	70	Kevin Conway	TRG Motorsports	Chevrolet	27.295	131.892
46	02	Brandon Ash	Ash Motorsports	Dodge	27.552	130.662

== Race ==
The race began at 3:15 p.m. EST and was televised in the United States on ESPN. Commentary was provided by play-by-play caller Jerry Punch, and both Dale Jarrett and Andy Petree provided analysis. Approximately 90,000 spectators attended the event. Around the start of the race, weather conditions were sunny. Phoenix International Raceway chaplin Ken Bowers began pre-race ceremonies by giving the invocation. Former J Records recording artist Tyrese Gibson performed the national anthem, and Senator John McCain commanded the drivers to start their engines. No driver had to move to rear of the grid at the start of the race.

Truex retained his pole position lead into the first lap. On the same lap, Kurt Busch passed Truex to become the new race leader. One lap later, Martin, who started tenth, fell to eleventh. On the 4th lap, Hornish had moved up to seventh position after passing Kyle Busch and Gordon. Two laps later, Montoya moved into the sixteenth position, as Martin passed Stewart for tenth on lap 7. By the 9th lap, Kurt Busch had a one-second lead over Truex One lap later, Kurt Busch increased his lead to 1.5 seconds. On lap 13, Martin passed Kyle Busch to claim ninth. Two laps later, Martin moved into eighth.

Gordon who began the race in fourteenth, had progressed eight positions to sixth by lap 22. Three laps later, Truex had reduced Kurt Busch's lead to one second, as Martin moved into seventh on lap 28. One lap later, Kurt Busch extended his lead over Truex to 1.6 seconds, as Gordon moved into fifth position. On lap 34, Johnson passed Truex for second and began closing up to Kurt Busch; Martin passed Gordon to claim fifth on lap 39. Four laps later, Johnson closed to half a second from Kurt Busch. Twelve laps later, Earnhardt dropped to twentieth position. On lap 54, Johnson passed Kurt Busch to claim the lead as slower traffic impeded Busch. Martin moved to fourth four laps later.

By lap 60, Johnson built up a 1.5 second lead over Kurt Busch, while Hamlin moved into the third position. Green flag pit stops took place from lap 65 to 73; Kurt Busch reclaimed the lead at the end of the cycle. On lap 90, Johnson passed Kurt Busch to take over the lead position by using Reed Sorenson for drafting purposes. Hamlin took over fifth position on the following lap. On the 102nd lap, Martin and Gordon moved into third and fourth respectively. Four laps later, Montoya moved into fourth. Having started on pole position, Truex clinched sixth position on lap 107. On lap 115, the pace car moved on track because debris was spotted on the track. During the caution, most of the leaders made pit stops.

Johnson maintained his lead on the lap 120 restart, followed by Martin and Gordon. Also, the second caution was prompted when Michael Waltrip damaged his car on that restart, Brad Keselowski was hit from behind and David Ragan spun sideways. None of the leaders chose to make pit stops, as the clean-up crew came on track to clear debris and fluids. Johnson held the lead at the lap 128 restart. Gordon accelerated slower than the leaders and dropped to sixth position by the next lap. On lap 129, Kyle Busch and Gordon made contact, but both managed to continue, without damaging their cars. By the next lap, Hamlin passed Martin for second position. On lap 134, Johnson had a 1.5 second lead, as Clint Bowyer moved into the fifth position. By the 138th lap, Johnson's lead was increased to two seconds.

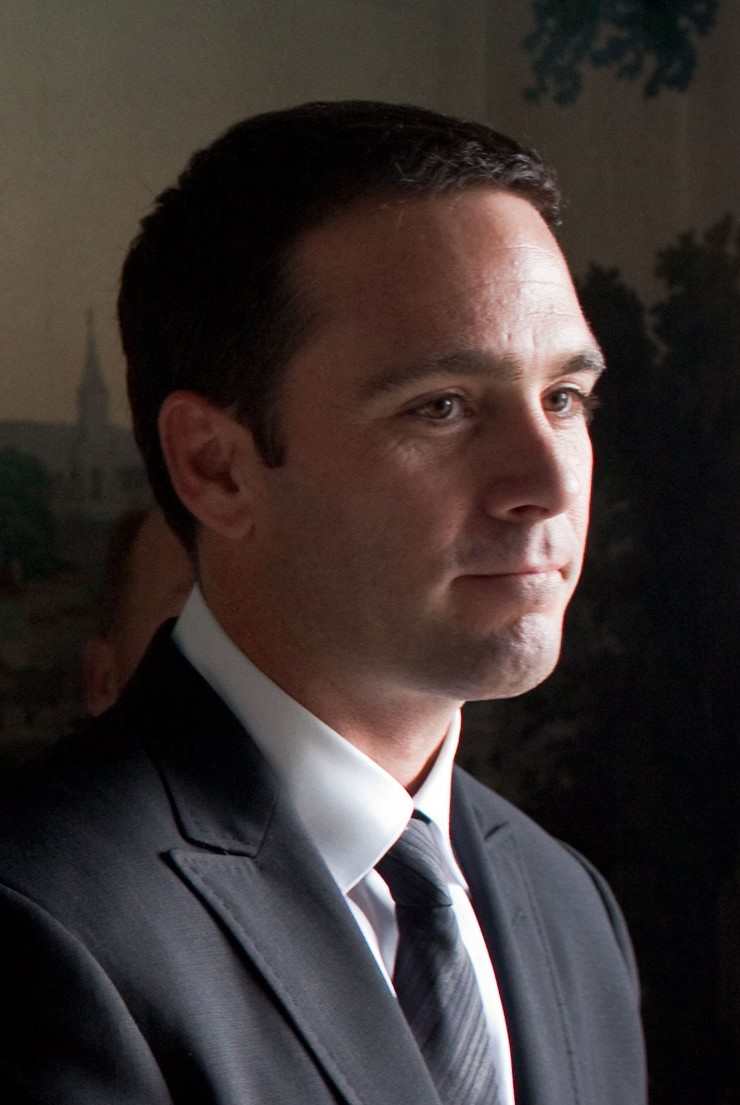
Jimmie Johnson won the race after leading the most laps, and maintained his lead in the Drivers' Championship

Kurt Busch and Montoya moved into fourth and ninth positions respectively on lap 141. By the 150th lap, Johnson had built up a 2.7 second lead over Hamlin. On lap 162, Johnson's lead of 3.4 seconds was reduced to nothing when debris was spotted on the track, causing a caution. During the caution, some of the leaders elected to make pit stops. Johnson remained the leader on the restart on lap 169, ahead of Bowyer and Hamlin. Two laps later, a multi-car collision occurred on the narrow front straightway as Earnhardt lost control of his car while driving on the inside of Ambrose, and collected Logano, Scott Speed, Hornish, Bobby Labonte, Kenseth, Stewart, Vickers and Keselowski. The damaged cars headed to the pit road during the caution as crews cleaned up debris.

Johnson maintained his lead at the lap 179 restart. On the same lap, Earnhardt headed for his garage because of an oil leak. Three laps later, Vickers and Labonte retired from the race, and Gordon dropped to tenth position. By the 186th lap, Johnson rebuilt his lead to 2.3 seconds, as Bowyer passed Gordon to claim third. Five laps later, Martin and Gordon moved into sixth and ninth positions respectively. Johnson's lead over Kurt Busch was three seconds by lap 196. Four laps later, Edwards moved up to eighteenth position, while Montoya moved to eighth, one lap later. By lap 203, Johnson maintained a 3.4 second lead, while Burton was passed by Martin for fifth position five laps later. Johnson's lead was increased to 4.3 seconds by the 215th lap. On lap 219, Hamlin moved into the third position, and one lap later, Martin moved up another place to fourth. On lap 222, Johnson increased his lead over Kurt Busch to almost five seconds. Six laps later, Earnhardt rejoined the race.

Green flag pit stops began on lap 240; Johnson made a pit stop on lap 242, giving the lead to Kenseth. After pit stops, Johnson regained the first position. By lap 277, the drivers reported their cars becoming loose as track temperatures began to drop. Twelve laps later, Burton passed Hamlin for the second position. On lap 296, Gordon passed Ambrose to claim ninth, while Truex moved into the fifth position. By lap 302, Johnson maintained a 1.8 second lead over Burton. Two laps later, David Reutimann moved back into the top ten after passing Ambrose, while Kurt Busch moved up to sixth on lap 310. Johnson maintained his lead to secure his seventh race victory of the 2009 season, the best win record of any driver over the course of the season, and the 47th of his career. Burton finished a season-high second, ahead of Hamlin in third, Martin in fourth, and Truex in fifth. Kurt Busch, Bowyer, Montoya, Gordon and Reutimann rounded out the top ten finishers. There were nine lead changes among four different drivers during the race. Johnson led four times for a total of 238 laps, more than any other driver.

=== Post-race ===
"I'm excited, and it's a great position to be in. But anything could go wrong like last week did."

— Johnson, speaking after the race.

Johnson appeared in victory lane to celebrate his seventh win of the season and received $267,001 in race winnings. Afterward, he said, "I guess it could have been a statement we were sending. There was a lot of pressure. All week long, we wondered if we could step up like we did today. I'm very proud how we rose to the occasion.", he continued, "When I go home tonight, I'm going to be (mentally) driving laps, what I think I need to do in qualifying trim so I can put my best effort in on Friday. Same thing for race practice on Saturday, and go racing Sunday. Texas was such a good lesson. And I hope that the points we lost in Texas isn't what keeps us from winning this championship."

Burton, who finished second, was happy with his performance, " [New crew chief] Todd Berrier has come in and done a great job, the team's done a great job. We had one hiccough early on pit road but the rest of them we picked out our spots every single time, and that's what it takes; it takes a team effort." In the subsequent post-race press conference, Hamlin said, "Anytime that Jimmie is down is not usually because of performance, it's usually because of an incident like last week. There was no doubt in my mind they were going to come this week and make a statement. Obviously leading all the laps pretty much and winning the race sends a statement out there that he is the best, that they're not going to be denied this year." Gordon commented, "We started off so good. It just seems every weekend we start off great and I don't know what it is. If we knew what it was, we'd do it."

The race result left Johnson maintaining the lead in the Drivers' Championship with 6,492 points. After the race, Martin who finished fourth, was less optimistic about his championship chances, "We've still got to go to Homestead and run like this again because we've still got that threat behind us, Jeff Gordon, especially." Gordon maintained third with 6,323 points but he would be mathematically ineligible to claim the championship when the season-ending Ford 400 commenced one week later. He was forty-two points ahead of Kurt Busch and one-hundred and sixteen in front of Stewart. In the Manufacturers' Championship, Chevrolet maintained the lead with 256 points. Toyota remained second with 198 points. Ford followed with 161 points, six ahead of Dodge in fourth. 5.17 million people watched the race on television. The race took two hours, forty-nine minutes and twenty-six seconds to complete, and the margin of victory was 1.033 seconds.

=== Race results ===
Pos	Car	Driver	Team	Manufacturer	Laps	Pts.
1	48	Jimmie Johnson	Hendrick Motorsports	Chevrolet	312	195^{2}
2	31	Jeff Burton	Richard Childress Racing	Chevrolet	312	170
3	11	Denny Hamlin	Joe Gibbs Racing	Toyota	312	165
4	5	Mark Martin	Hendrick Motorsports	Chevrolet	312	160
5	1	Martin Truex Jr.	Earnhardt Ganassi Racing	Chevrolet	312	155
6	2	Kurt Busch	Penske Championship Racing	Dodge	312	155^{1}
7	33	Clint Bowyer	Richard Childress Racing	Chevrolet	312	146
8	42	Juan Pablo Montoya	Earnhardt Ganassi Racing	Chevrolet	312	142
9	24	Jeff Gordon	Hendrick Motorsports	Chevrolet	312	138
10	00	David Reuitmann	Michael Waltrip Racing	Toyota	312	134
11	47	Marcos Ambrose	JTG Daugherty Racing	Toyota	312	130
12	18	Kyle Busch	Joe Gibbs Racing	Toyota	312	127
13	44	A. J. Allmendinger	Richard Petty Motorsports	Ford	312	124
14	16	Greg Biffle	Roush Fenway Racing	Ford	312	121
15	9	Kasey Kahne	Richard Petty Motorsports	Dodge	312	118
16	99	Carl Edwards	Roush Fenway Racing	Ford	312	115
17	77	Sam Hornish Jr.	Team Penske	Dodge	311	112
18	17	Matt Kenseth	Roush Fenway Racing	Ford	311	114^{1}
19	26	Jamie McMurray	Roush Fenway Racing	Ford	311	106
20	39	Ryan Newman	Stewart–Haas Racing	Chevrolet	311	108^{1}
21	20	Joey Logano	Joe Gibbs Racing	Chevrolet	310	100
22	7	Robby Gordon	Robby Gordon Motorsports	Toyota	310	97
23	6	David Ragan	Roush Fenway Racing	Ford	310	94
24	29	Kevin Harvick	Richard Childress Racing	Chevrolet	310	91
25	14	Tony Stewart	Stewart–Haas Racing	Chevrolet	310	88
26	43	Reed Sorenson	Richard Petty Motorsports	Dodge	310	85
27	07	Casey Mears	Richard Childress Racing	Chevrolet	308	82
28	19	Elliott Sadler	Richard Petty Motorsports	Dodge	308	79
29	98	Paul Menard	Robert Yates Racing	Ford	308	76
30	09	David Gilliland	Joe Gibbs Racing	Chevrolet	308	73
31	96	Erik Darnell	Hall of Fame Racing	Ford	306	70
32	13	Max Papis	Germain Racing	Toyota	304	67
33	82	Scott Speed	Red Bull Racing Team	Toyota	303	64
34	34	John Andretti	Front Row Motorsports	Chevrolet	268	61
35	88	Dale Earnhardt Jr.	Hendrick Motorsports	Chevrolet	256	58
36	55	Michael Waltrip	Michael Waltrip Racing	Toyota	251	55
37	12	Brad Keselowski	Penske Championship Racing	Dodge	239	52
38	83	Brian Vickers	Red Bull Racing Team	Toyota	170	49
39	71	Bobby Labonte	TRG Motorsports	Chevrolet	169	46
40	87	Joe Nemechek	NEMCO Motorsports	Toyota	47	43
41	36	Michael McDowell	Tommy Baldwin Racing	Toyota	36	40
42	66	Dave Blaney	Prism Motorsports	Toyota	9	37
43	37	Tony Raines	Front Row Motorsports	Chevrolet	6	34
^{1} Includes five bonus points for leading a lap
^{2} Includes ten bonus points for leading the most laps

== Standings after the race ==
Drivers' Championship standings

Pos	+/–	Driver	Points
1		Jimmie Johnson	6,492
2		Mark Martin	6,384 (−108)
3		Jeff Gordon	6,323 (−169)
4		Kurt Busch	6,281 (−211)
5		Tony Stewart	6,207 (−285)
6		Juan Pablo Montoya	6,203 (−289)
7		Greg Biffle	6,171 (−321)
8		Denny Hamlin	6,140 (−352)
9		Ryan Newman	6,081 (−411)
10		Kasey Kahne	6,016 (−476)
11		Carl Edwards	5,972 (−520)
12		Brian Vickers	5,826 (−666)

Manufacturers' Championship standings

Pos	+/–	Manufacturer	Points
1		Chevrolet	256
2		Toyota	198 (−58)
3		Ford	161 (−95)
4		Dodge	155 (−101)

- Note: Only the top twelve positions are included for the driver standings. These drivers qualified for the Chase for the Sprint Cup.

Previous race: 2009 Dickies 500	Sprint Cup Series; 2009 season	Next race: 2009 Ford 400
