= 2006 UAW-DaimlerChrysler 400 =

NASCAR auto race at Las Vegas in 2006

Race details
- Race 3 of 36 in the 2006 NASCAR Nextel Cup Series season
- 2006 UAW-DaimlerChrysler 400 program cover
- Date: March 12, 2006
- Location: Las Vegas Motor Speedway in Clark County, Nevada
- Course: Permanent racing facility
- Course length: 1.5 miles (2.4 km)
- Distance: 270 laps, 405 mi (651.784 km)
- Scheduled distance: 267 laps, 400.5 mi (644.542 km)
- Weather: Cold with temperatures approaching 51.8 °F (11.0 °C); wind speeds up to 15.9 miles per hour (25.6 km/h)
- Average speed: 133.358 miles per hour (214.619 km/h)

Pole position
Driver	Greg Biffle	Roush Racing
- Time: 31.322

Most laps led
Driver	Matt Kenseth	Roush Racing
- Laps: 146

Winner
No. 48	Jimmie Johnson	Hendrick Motorsports

Television in the United States
- Network: Fox
- Announcers: Mike Joy, Darrell Waltrip and Larry McReynolds

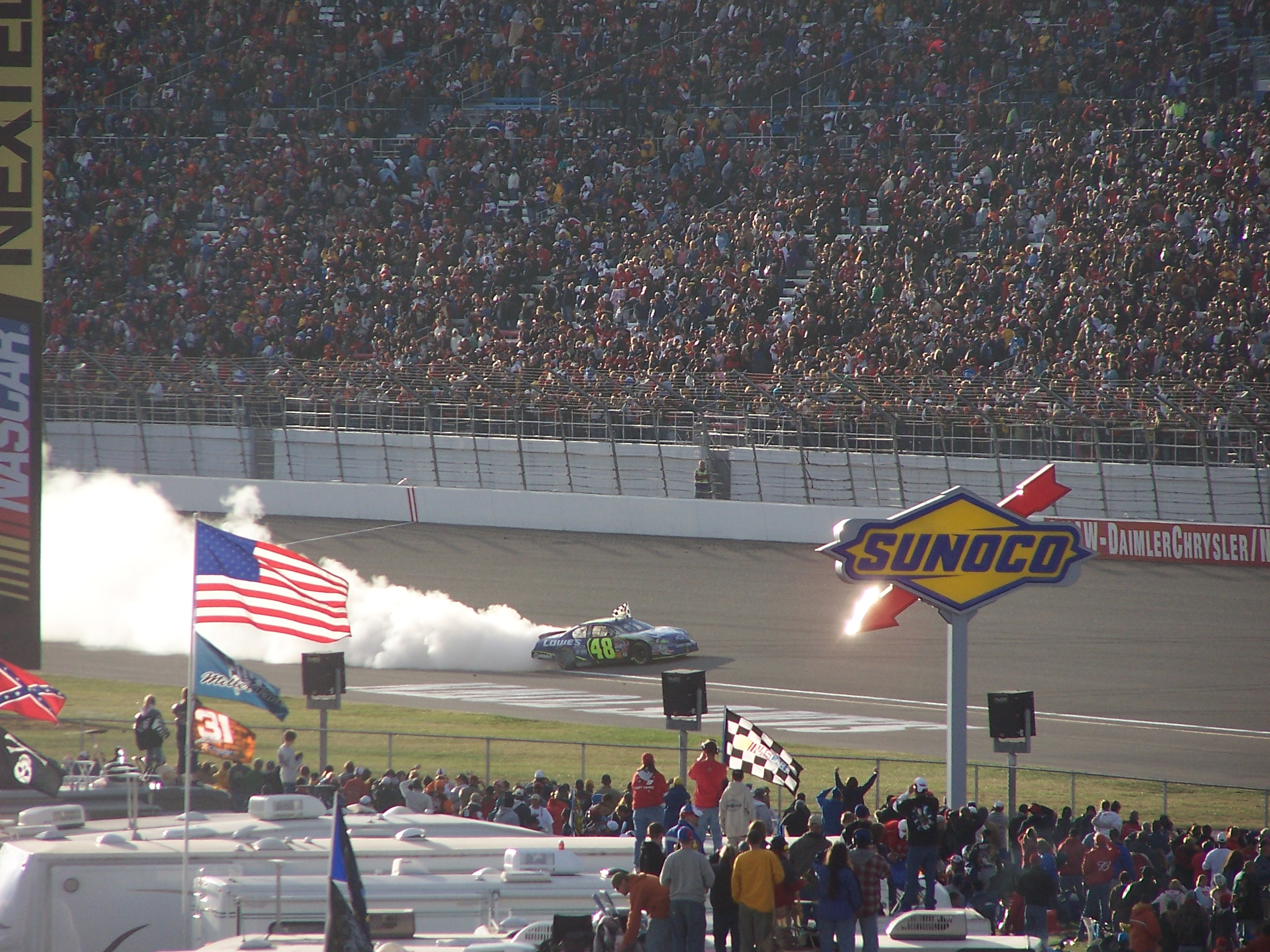
Jimmie Johnson doing a burnout after winning the 2006 UAW-DaimlerChrysler 400.

The 2006 UAW-DaimlerChrysler 400 was the third race in the 2006 NASCAR Nextel Cup Series season which took place at Las Vegas Motor Speedway on March 12, 2006.

== Qualifying ==
Pos	Car #	Driver	Make	Speed	Time	Behind
1	16	Greg Biffle	Ford	172.403	31.322	0.000
2	20	Tony Stewart	Chevrolet	172.068	31.383	-0.061
3	48	Jimmie Johnson	Chevrolet	171.597	31.469	-0.147
4	5	Kyle Busch	Chevrolet	171.423	31.501	-0.179
5	9	Kasey Kahne	Dodge	171.054	31.569	-0.247
6	2	Kurt Busch	Dodge	171.027	31.574	-0.252
7	1	Joe Nemechek	Chevrolet	170.864	31.604	-0.282
8	31	Jeff Burton	Chevrolet	170.816	31.613	-0.291
9	17	Matt Kenseth	Ford	170.665	31.641	-0.319
10	25	Brian Vickers	Chevrolet	170.638	31.646	-0.324
11	12	Ryan Newman	Dodge	170.578	31.657	-0.335
12	18	J. J. Yeley	Chevrolet	170.546	31.663	-0.341
13	24	Jeff Gordon	Chevrolet	170.170	31.733	-0.411
14	66	Jeff Green	Chevrolet	170.154	31.736	-0.414
15	88	Dale Jarrett	Ford	170.127	31.741	-0.419
16	11	Denny Hamlin	Chevrolet	170.036	31.758	-0.436
17	43	Bobby Labonte	Dodge	170.009	31.763	-0.441
18	6	Mark Martin	Ford	169.966	31.771	-0.449
19	26	Jamie McMurray	Ford	169.763	31.809	-0.487
20	7	Clint Bowyer	Chevrolet	169.758	31.810	-0.488
21	99	Carl Edwards	Ford	169.300	31.896	-0.574
22	10	Scott Riggs	Dodge	169.152	31.924	-0.602
23	21	Ken Schrader	Ford	168.988	31.955	-0.633
24	19	Jeremy Mayfield	Dodge	168.840	31.983	-0.661
25	55	Michael Waltrip	Dodge	168.829	31.985	-0.663
26	38	Elliott Sadler	Ford	168.782	31.994	-0.672
27	1	Martin Truex Jr.	Chevrolet	168.782	31.994	-0.672
28	22	Dave Blaney	Dodge	168.776	31.995	-0.673
29	29	Kevin Harvick	Chevrolet	168.497	32.048	-0.726
30	61	Kevin Lepage	Ford	168.329	32.080	-0.758
31	14	Sterling Marlin	Chevrolet	168.287	32.088	-0.766
32	7	Robby Gordon	Chevrolet	168.167	32.111	-0.789
33	32	Travis Kvapil	Chevrolet	167.999	32.143	-0.821
34	78	Kenny Wallace	Chevrolet	167.890	32.164	-0.842
35	96	Terry Labonte	Chevrolet	167.686	32.203	-0.881
36	41	Reed Sorenson	Dodge	167.624	32.215	-0.893
37	4	Scott Wimmer	Chevrolet	167.483	32.242	-0.920
38	42	Casey Mears	Dodge	167.260	32.285	-0.963
39	45	Kyle Petty	Dodge	167.136	32.309	-0.987
40	40	David Stremme	Dodge	166.672	32.399	-1.077
41	49	Brent Sherman	Dodge	165.487	32.631	-1.309
42	8	Dale Earnhardt Jr.	Chevrolet	163.334	33.061	-1.739
43	34	Chad Chaffin	Chevrolet	167.343	32.269	-0.947
Failed to qualify or withdrew
44	95	Stanton Barrett	Chevrolet			
45	00	Hermie Sadler	Ford			
46	02	Brandon Ash	Dodge			
47	37	Mike Skinner	Dodge			
48	89	Morgan Shepherd	Dodge			
49	64	Randy LaJoie	Dodge			
WD	04	Bobby Hamilton Jr.	Dodge			
WD	74	Derrike Cope	Dodge			

== Race recap ==
Greg Biffle clocked the fastest lap in qualifying at 172.403 mph.

In the third consecutive race to require a green–white–checkered finish, Jimmie Johnson blew past Matt Kenseth on the last corner of the day to get his 20th career victory and second of the season. Kenseth looked like a good bet to cruise to victory before Denny Hamlin and Kenny Wallace wrecked three laps from the end, bunching the field and leading to the overtime finish. Before the lap 268 restart, Kenseth told his crew that his engine felt weak, but he was able to protect the lead until the last corner, where Johnson, who had not led all day, overtook the 17 car on the high side to take the win by a half a car length.

== Race results ==
Fin	St	Car #	Driver	Make	Points	Bonus	Laps	Winnings
1	3	48	Jimmie Johnson	Chevrolet	185	5	270	$386,936
2	9	17	Matt Kenseth	Ford	180	10	270	$293,116
3	4	5	Kyle Busch	Chevrolet	170	5	270	$204,775
4	5	9	Kasey Kahne	Dodge	160		270	$186,714
5	13	24	Jeff Gordon	Chevrolet	155		270	$165,686
6	18	6	Mark Martin	Ford	155	5	270	$122,950
7	8	31	Jeff Burton	Chevrolet	146		270	$145,270
8	1	16	Greg Biffle	Ford	147	5	270	$125,025
9	38	42	Casey Mears	Dodge	138		270	$147,383
10	16	11	Denny Hamlin *	Chevrolet	134		270	$109,650
11	29	29	Kevin Harvick	Chevrolet	130		270	$138,136
12	32	7	Robby Gordon	Chevrolet	127		270	$101,300
13	7	1	Joe Nemechek	Chevrolet	124		270	$126,295
14	26	38	Elliott Sadler	Ford	126	5	270	$125,758
15	20	7	Clint Bowyer *	Chevrolet	118		270	$105,800
16	6	2	Kurt Busch	Dodge	115		270	$126,583
17	12	18	J. J. Yeley *	Chevrolet	112		270	$129,025
18	14	66	Jeff Green	Chevrolet	109		270	$119,508
19	15	88	Dale Jarrett	Ford	106		270	$124,325
20	27	1	Martin Truex Jr. *	Chevrolet	103		270	$113,558
21	2	20	Tony Stewart	Chevrolet	105	5	270	$130,036
22	10	25	Brian Vickers	Chevrolet	102	5	270	$97,150
23	19	26	Jamie McMurray	Ford	94		270	$113,625
24	35	96	Terry Labonte	Chevrolet	96	5	270	$83,825
25	24	19	Jeremy Mayfield	Dodge	88		270	$116,016
26	21	99	Carl Edwards	Ford	85		270	$90,225
27	42	8	Dale Earnhardt Jr.	Chevrolet	82		270	$118,916
28	22	10	Scott Riggs	Dodge	79		270	$82,825
29	39	45	Kyle Petty	Dodge	81	5	270	$104,783
30	17	43	Bobby Labonte	Dodge	78	5	270	$119,311
31	28	22	Dave Blaney	Dodge	70		269	$90,833
32	37	4	Scott Wimmer	Chevrolet	67		269	$78,975
33	40	40	David Stremme *	Dodge	64		267	$97,272
34	41	49	Brent Sherman *	Dodge	61		266	$78,575
35	25	55	Michael Waltrip	Dodge	58		266	$78,375
36	31	14	Sterling Marlin	Chevrolet	55		258	$78,175
37	30	61	Kevin Lepage	Ford	52		251	$77,950
38	34	178	Kenny Wallace	Chevrolet	PE		250	$77,750
39	33	32	Travis Kvapil	Chevrolet	46		216	$77,550
40	36	41	Reed Sorenson *	Dodge	43		206	$85,300
41	23	21	Ken Schrader	Ford	40		187	$104,314
42	43	34	Chad Chaffin	Chevrolet	37		157	$76,950
43	11	12	Ryan Newman	Dodge	34		88	$112,125

Failed to qualify: Stanton Barrett (#95), Hermie Sadler (#00), Brandon Ash (#02), Mike Skinner (#37), Morgan Shepherd (#89), Randy LaJoie (#92)

Previous race: 2006 Auto Club 500	Nextel Cup Series; 2006 season	Next race: 2006 Golden Corral 500
