= Brandon Ash =

American racing driver (born 1977)

- Born: July 17, 1977 (age 49); Umpqua, Oregon, U.S.

NASCAR Cup Series career
- 5 races run over 4 years
- Best finish: 64th (2006)
- First race: 2004 Dodge/Save Mart 350 (Sonoma)
- Last race: 2009 Toyota/Save Mart 350 (Sonoma)
Wins	Top tens	Poles
0	0	0
- Statistics up to date as of January 11, 2011.

Brandon Ash (born July 17, 1977) is an American professional stock car racing driver. He competed part-time in the NASCAR Cup Series each year from 2002 to 2010, usually attempting races on the west coast. He also competed part-time and full-time in the NASCAR West Series.

== Racing career ==
Ash's career began in racing karts. After Ash won the Late Model Sportsman track championship at Coos Bay (Ore.) International Speedway, he decided to start racing in the NASCAR Winston West Series. He raced a limited number of events in 1996 and 1997. He ran full-time in 1998 when he was one of three rookies to win a pole position. He nearly won his first series event at Sears Point that year, but his car ran out of fuel just short of the finish line. He has recorded one win in the series, a 2002 victory in Kansas.

Ash made his Nextel Cup debut at Infineon Raceway in 2004 with his own team, where he finished 41st in his No. 02 car. In 2005, he raised eyebrows by qualifying eighteenth at Kansas Speedway, and ran well in the opening laps before he was spun by Dale Earnhardt Jr.

In 2006, Ash made two races, finishing 43rd in the Subway Fresh 500 at Phoenix International Raceway, and qualifying 43rd for the Dodge/Save Mart 350 at Infineon Raceway. He led one lap at Phoenix.

In 2007, Ash attempted to qualify for the race at Infineon Raceway. His qualifying speed was fortieth of 52 cars, but he did not qualify fast enough to make the race. All teams outside of the top-35 in points qualify for eight starting positions, and Ash's speed was too slow.

In 2008, Ash only attempted to qualify for the Cup Series race at Sonoma and failed to qualify.

In 2009, Ash began to the season by attempting the spring race at Phoenix, which he failed to qualify for & made it his fifteenth DNQ in twenty career Sprint Cup attempts. However Ash did qualify for the race at Sonoma that year with sponsorship from Efusjon Energy Club, Ash started 43rd but ran 25th most of the day. He would finish 41st after he was wrecked. He would also attempt the fall race at Phoenix but again failed to qualify.

In 2010, Ash attempted to qualify for two races: Phoenix International Raceway and Infineon Raceway, failing to qualifying for both of them. He was the slowest out of the go or go homers at Phoenix but barely missed the race at Infineon missing it by three one-hundredths of a second. These were his most recent attempts in the Cup Series and NASCAR.

Ash did not attempt any races in the Cup Series and any other NASCAR series in 2011 and has not each year since then.

On August 14, 2021, Ash competed in the Outlaw 100, a Pacific Racing Association race held at his home track of Douglas County Speedway located in his hometown of Roseburg, Oregon.

== Personal life ==
Ash is a graduate of Oakland High School in Oakland, Oregon. He is married to Tiffany, and the couple has three children. As of 2021, he is a resident of Roseburg, Oregon.

== Motorsports career results ==
=== NASCAR ===
(key) (Bold – Pole position awarded by qualifying time. Italics – Pole position earned by points standings or practice time. * – Most laps led.)

==== Sprint Cup Series ====
NASCAR Sprint Cup Series results
Year	Team	No.	Make	1	2	3	4	5	6	7	8	9	10	11	12	13	14	15	16	17	18	19	20	21	22	23	24	25	26	27	28	29	30	31	32	33	34	35	36	NSCC	Pts	Ref
2002	Ash Motorsports	46	Ford	DAY	CAR	LVS	ATL	DAR	BRI	TEX	MAR	TAL	CAL	RCH	CLT	DOV	POC	MCH	SON; DNQ	DAY	CHI	NHA	POC	IND	GLN	MCH	BRI	DAR	RCH	NHA	DOV	KAN	TAL	CLT	MAR	ATL	CAR	PHO	HOM	NA	-	
2003	Ash Motorsports	02	Ford	DAY	CAR	LVS; DNQ	ATL	DAR	BRI	TEX	TAL	MAR	CAL	RCH	CLT	DOV	POC	MCH	SON; DNQ	DAY	CHI	NHA	POC	IND	GLN	MCH	BRI	DAR	RCH	NHA	DOV	TAL	KAN	CLT	MAR	ATL	PHO; DNQ	CAR	HOM	NA	-	
2004	Ash Motorsports	02	Ford	DAY	CAR	LVS	ATL	DAR	BRI	TEX	MAR	TAL	CAL	RCH	CLT	DOV	POC	MCH	SON; 41	DAY	CHI	NHA	POC	IND	GLN	MCH	BRI	CAL	RCH	NHA	DOV	TAL	KAN	CLT	MAR	ATL	PHO	DAR	HOM	87th	40	
2005	Ash Motorsports	02	Ford	DAY	CAL	LVS	ATL	BRI	MAR	TEX	PHO; DNQ	TAL	DAR	RCH	CLT	DOV	POC	MCH	SON; DNQ	DAY	CHI	NHA	POC	IND	GLN	MCH	BRI	CAL	RCH	NHA	DOV	TAL								85th	37	
2005	Ash Motorsports	02	Dodge																														KAN; 42	CLT	MAR	ATL	TEX	PHO; DNQ	HOM	85th	37	
2006	Ash Motorsports	02	Dodge	DAY	CAL	LVS; DNQ	ATL	BRI	MAR	TEX	PHO; 43	TAL	RCH	DAR	CLT	DOV	POC	MCH	SON; 38	DAY	CHI	NHA	POC	IND	GLN; DNQ	MCH	BRI	CAL	RCH	NHA	DOV	KAN	TAL	CLT	MAR	ATL	TEX	PHO; DNQ	HOM	64th	88	
2007	Ash Motorsports	02	Dodge	DAY	CAL	LVS	ATL	BRI	MAR	TEX	PHO; DNQ	TAL	RCH	DAR	CLT	DOV	POC	MCH	SON; DNQ	NHA	DAY	CHI	IND	POC	GLN	MCH	BRI	CAL	RCH	NHA	DOV	KAN	TAL	CLT	MAR	ATL	TEX	PHO	HOM	NA	-	
2008	Ash Motorsports	02	Dodge	DAY	CAL	LVS	ATL	BRI	MAR	TEX	PHO	TAL	RCH	DAR	CLT	DOV	POC	MCH	SON; DNQ	NHA	DAY	CHI	IND	POC	GLN	MCH	BRI	CAL	RCH	NHA	DOV	KAN	TAL	CLT	MAR	ATL	TEX	PHO	HOM	NA	-	
2009	Ash Motorsports	02	Dodge	DAY	CAL	LVS	ATL	BRI	MAR	TEX	PHO; DNQ	TAL	RCH	DAR	CLT	DOV	POC	MCH	SON; 41	NHA	DAY	CHI	IND	POC	GLN	MCH	BRI	ATL	RCH	NHA	DOV	KAN	CAL	CLT	MAR	TAL	TEX	PHO; DNQ	HOM	65th	40	
2010	Ash Motorsports	02	Dodge	DAY	CAL	LVS	ATL	BRI	MAR	PHO; DNQ	TEX	TAL	RCH	DAR	DOV	CLT	POC	MCH	SON; DNQ	NHA	DAY	CHI	IND	POC	GLN	MCH	BRI	ATL	RCH	NHA	DOV	KAN	CAL	CLT	MAR	TAL	TEX	PHO	HOM	NA	-	

==== West Series ====
NASCAR West Series results
Year	Team	No.	Make	1	2	3	4	5	6	7	8	9	10	11	12	13	14	15	NWSC	Pts	Ref
1996	Ash Motorsports	23	Ford	TUS	AMP	MMR	SON	MAD	POR; 16	TUS	EVG; 22	CNS	MAD; 21	MMR	SON	MMR; 21	PHO	LVS	24th	412	
1997	Ash Motorsports	23	Ford	TUS	AMP; 13	SON	TUS	MMR	LVS	CAL	EVG; 8	POR; 16	PPR; 15	AMP	SON	MMR; 21	LVS		21st	599	
1998	Ash Motorsports	23	Ford	TUS; 20	LVS; 29	PHO; 5	CAL; 16	HPT; 14	MMR; 19	AMP; 19	**POR**; 16	CAL; 17	PPR; 11	EVG; 20	SON; 2	MMR; 21	LVS; 35		11th	1580	
1999	Ash Motorsports	23	Ford	TUS; 2	LVS; 9	PHO; 5	CAL; 11	PPR; 17	MMR; 2	IRW; 7	EVG; 3	POR; 22	IRW; 16	RMR; 18	LVS; 15	MMR; 25	MOT; 20		8th	1831	
2000	Ash Motorsports	23	Ford	PHO; 21	MMR	LVS	CAL; 32	LAG	IRW	POR	EVG	IRW	RMR; 24	MMR	IRW				36th	258	
2001	Hilton Racing	23	Ford	PHO; 13	LVS; 26	TUS; 3	MMR; 7	CAL; 23	IRW; 11	LAG; 7	KAN; 21	EVG; 4	CNS; 15	IRW; 8	RMR; 15	LVS; 10	IRW; 2		9th	1852	
2002	Hilton Racing	23	Ford	PHO; 18	LVS; 9	CAL; 16	KAN; 1*	EVG; 7	IRW; 8	**S99**; 9	RMR; 10	DCS; 5	LVS; 5						6th	1417	
2004	Ash Motorsports	23	Ford	PHO; 9	MMR	CAL	S99	EVG	IRW	S99	RMR	DCS	PHO	CNS	MMR	IRW			52nd	138	
2005	Christina Adair	3	Ford	PHO; 5	MMR	PHO	S99	IRW	EVG	S99	PPR	CAL	DCS	CTS	MMR				38th	155	
