= 2009 Pepsi 500 =

Race details
- Race 30 of 36 in the 2009 NASCAR Sprint Cup Series
- Auto Club Speedway
- Date: October 11, 2009
- Location: Auto Club Speedway Fontana, California
- Course: Permanent racing facility
- Course length: 2.0 miles (3.23 km)
- Distance: 250 laps, 500 mi (804.672 km)
- Weather: Temperatures up to 69.8 °F (21.0 °C); wind speeds up to 8.9 miles per hour (14.3 km/h)
- Average speed: 143.908 miles per hour (231.597 km/h)
- Attendance: 70,000

Pole position
Driver	Denny Hamlin	Joe Gibbs Racing
- Time: 39.158

Most laps led
Driver	Jimmie Johnson	Hendrick Motorsports
- Laps: 126

Winner
No. 48	Jimmie Johnson	Hendrick Motorsports

Television in the United States
- Network: ABC
- Announcers: Jerry Punch, Dale Jarrett and Andy Petree

The 2009 Pepsi 500 was the thirtieth race of the 2009 NASCAR Sprint Cup season and also served as the fourth race in the 2009 Chase for the Sprint Cup. It took place on October 11, 2009, at Auto Club Speedway in the American community of Fontana, California.

== Summary ==
Jimmie Johnson would defeat his Hendrick Motorsports teammate Jeff Gordon by slightly more than 1.6 seconds after a grueling three hours and twenty-eight minutes of racing.

Kyle Busch suffered through three different illnesses during this race; including a non-H1N1 form of the flu. After driving for 62 laps, he felt weak and went into the pits in order for David Gilliland to perform the substitute duty for him. David Gilliland finished the race in 28th place but Busch received the points for it. Mike Bliss walked away as the last-place finisher after encountering engine problems on lap 11.

The Big One struck with six laps to go after Dale Earnhardt Jr. was turned around and collected 8 other cars (including all 4 Richard Petty Motorsports cars). This led to a red flag of almost 22 minutes.

The gambling pundits handpicked Jimmie Johnson to be the winner of the race; with Greg Biffle and Matt Kenseth being wild cards. Just before the race, Johnson had an average finish of 6th place in his 13 prior races at Auto Club Speedway and finished worse than tenth place only twice.

=== Results ===
Finish	Start	Car	Driver	Make	Pts/bns	Laps	Status	Winnings
1	3	48	Jimmie Johnson	Chevrolet	195/10	250	Running	302,801
2	10	24	Jeff Gordon	Chevrolet	175/5	250	Running	211,426
3	4	42	Juan Montoya	Chevrolet	170/5	250	Running	195,773
4	9	5	Mark Martin	Chevrolet	165/5	250	Running	136,625
5	20	14	Tony Stewart	Chevrolet	160/5	250	Running	143,248
6	11	99	Carl Edwards	Ford	150/0	250	Running	158,356
7	31	6	David Ragan	Ford	146/0	250	Running	117,500
8	24	2	Kurt Busch	Dodge	147/5	250	Running	121,925
9	8	33	Clint Bowyer	Chevrolet	138/0	250	Running	113,950
10	7	29	Kevin Harvick	Chevrolet	134/0	250	Running	142,828
11	16	07	Casey Mears	Chevrolet	130/0	250	Running	121,525
12	22	77	Sam Hornish Jr.	Dodge	127/0	250	Running	120,810
