= Chris Cook (racing driver) =

American race car driver and driving instructor

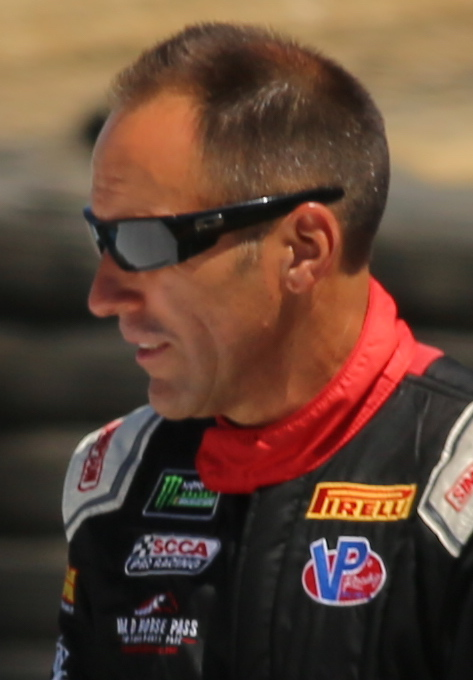
- Cook at Sonoma Raceway in 2018
- Born: December 23, 1971 (age 54); Phoenix, Arizona, U.S.

NASCAR Cup Series career
- 5 races run over 4 years
- 2018 position: 45th
- Best finish: 45th (2018)
- First race: 2005 Dodge/Save Mart 350 (Sears Point)
- Last race: 2018 Toyota/Save Mart 350 (Sonoma)
Wins	Top tens	Poles
0	0	0

NASCAR O'Reilly Auto Parts Series career
- 15 races run over 7 years
- 2016 position: 84th
- Best finish: 78th (2006)
- First race: 1999 Lysol 200 (Watkins Glen)
- Last race: 2016 Zippo 200 at The Glen (Watkins Glen)
Wins	Top tens	Poles
0	0	0
- Statistics up to date as of November 18, 2018.

Chris Cook (born December 23, 1971) is an American professional race car driver and driving instructor, who instructs at the Bob Bondurant School of High Performance Driving and competes irregularly in NASCAR and other racing series, specializing in road course racing as a road course ringer.

== Racing career ==
Cook was the youngest driver to become a chief instructor at the Bob Bondurant School of High Performance Driving. He has competed in the IMSA Firestone Firehawk Endurance Championship and in late model stock cars at Nashville Speedway USA, as well as in selected NASCAR events, and in the Formula D championship. Cook is best known in drifting for a wreck at the 2007 NOPI Drift Los Angeles in which his Dodge Viper flipped, knocking Cook unconscious.

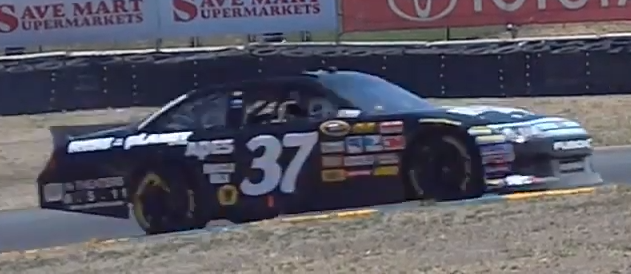
Cook's No. 37 car at Sonoma Raceway in 2011

After making a name for himself as an instructor for NASCAR drivers in road course racing, including instructing Tony Stewart in the art of road course driving, Cook made his debut in the NASCAR Nextel Cup Series in 2005 at Infineon Raceway, driving for Joe Nemechek and finishing 28th. He failed to qualify for several other races in 2005, 2006 and 2011 before qualifying for the 2011 Sprint Cup Series race at Infineon, substituting for Tomy Drissi in the Max Q Motorsports No. 37, and finishing 27th. He is one of the drivers referred to as a "road course ringer", specialist drivers who often replace regular NASCAR drivers at the two road course races on the tour schedule.

Cook has also competed in twelve races in the NASCAR Nationwide Series (formerly the NASCAR Busch Series) between 1999 and 2009, with a best finish of 20th at Autódromo Hermanos Rodríguez in Mexico City in 2006 while driving for John McNelly.

Cook has also competed in the 24 Hours of Daytona, running for Rick Ware Racing in the 2012 edition of the event; he finished 38th in the race. Later in 2012 he returned to the Sprint Cup Series, driving the No. 19 Toyota for Humphrey Smith Racing at Sonoma Raceway, finishing 42nd; he also drove for Rick Ware Racing in the Nationwide Series at Watkins Glen International in August.

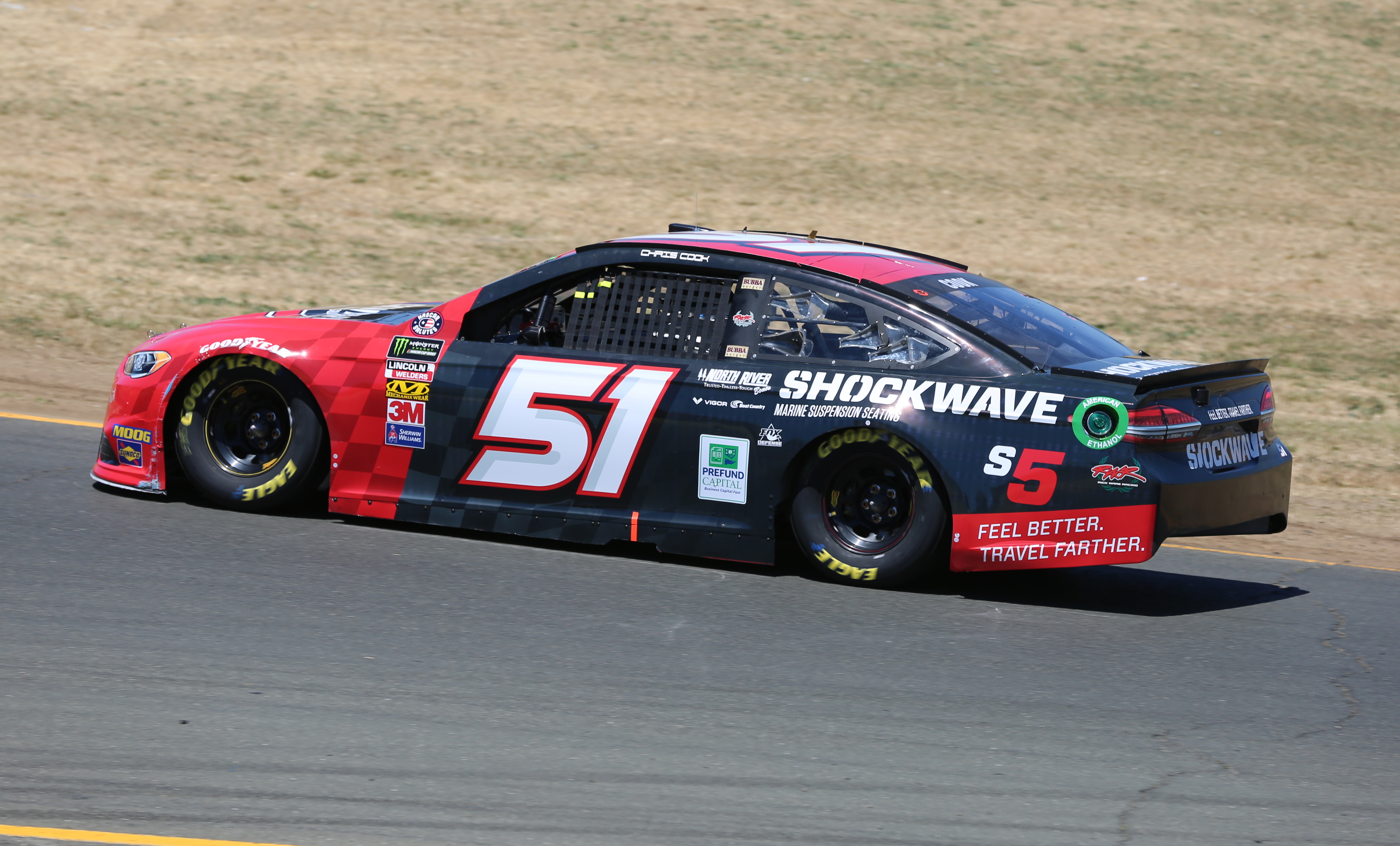
Cook's No. 51 at Sonoma Raceway in 2018

In 2018, Cook returned to the Monster Energy NASCAR Cup Series with Ware, driving his No. 51 entry.

== Motorsports career results ==
=== NASCAR ===
(key) (Bold – Pole position awarded by qualifying time. Italics – Pole position earned by points standings or practice time. * – Most laps led.)

==== Monster Energy Cup Series ====
Monster Energy NASCAR Cup Series results
Year	Team	No.	Make	1	2	3	4	5	6	7	8	9	10	11	12	13	14	15	16	17	18	19	20	21	22	23	24	25	26	27	28	29	30	31	32	33	34	35	36	NSCC	Pts	Ref
2005	NEMCO Motorsports	87	Chevy	DAY	CAL	LVS	ATL	BRI	MAR	TEX	PHO	TAL	DAR	RCH	CLT	DOV	POC	MCH	SON; 28	DAY	CHI	NHA	POC	IND	GLN; DNQ	MCH	BRI	CAL	RCH	NHA	DOV	TAL	KAN	CLT	MAR	ATL	TEX	PHO	HOM	72nd	79	
2006	BAM Racing	49	Dodge	DAY	CAL	LVS	ATL	BRI	MAR	TEX	PHO	TAL	RCH	DAR	CLT	DOV	POC	MCH	SON; DNQ	DAY	CHI	NHA	POC	IND	GLN; DNQ	MCH	BRI	CAL	RCH	NHA	DOV	KAN	TAL	CLT	MAR	ATL	TEX	PHO	HOM	NA	-	
2009	Front Row Motorsports	37	Dodge	DAY	CAL	LVS	ATL	BRI	MAR	TEX	PHO	TAL	RCH	DAR	CLT	DOV	POC	MCH	SON; DNQ	NHA	DAY	CHI	IND	POC	GLN	MCH	BRI	ATL	RCH	NHA	DOV	KAN	CAL	CLT	MAR	TAL	TEX	PHO	HOM	79th	0	
2011	Max Q Motorsports	37	Ford	DAY	PHO	LVS	BRI	CAL	MAR	TEX	TAL	RCH	DAR	DOV	CLT	KAN	POC	MCH	SON; 27	DAY	KEN	NHA	IND	POC	GLN	MCH	BRI	ATL	RCH	CHI	NHA	DOV	KAN	CLT	TAL	MAR	TEX	PHO	HOM	48th	17	
2012	Humphrey Smith Racing	19	Toyota	DAY	PHO	LVS	BRI	CAL	MAR	TEX	KAN	RCH	TAL	DAR	CLT	DOV	POC	MCH	SON; 42	KEN	DAY	NHA	IND	POC	GLN; 41	MCH	BRI	ATL	RCH	CHI	NHA	DOV	TAL	CLT	KAN	MAR	TEX	PHO	HOM	74th	5	
2018	Rick Ware Racing	51	Ford	DAY	ATL	LVS	PHO	CAL	MAR	TEX	BRI	RCH	TAL	DOV	KAN	CLT	POC	MCH	SON; 31	CHI	DAY	KEN	NHA	POC	GLN	MCH	BRI	DAR	IND	LVS	RCH	CLT	DOV	TAL	KAN	MAR	TEX	PHO	HOM	45th	6	

==== Xfinity Series ====
NASCAR Xfinity Series results
Year	Team	No.	Make	1	2	3	4	5	6	7	8	9	10	11	12	13	14	15	16	17	18	19	20	21	22	23	24	25	26	27	28	29	30	31	32	33	34	35	NXSC	Pts	Ref
1999	Sasser Motorsports	65	Chevy	DAY	CAR	LVS	ATL	DAR	TEX	NSV; DNQ	BRI	TAL	CAL	NHA	RCH	NZH	CLT	DOV	SBO	GLN; 39	MLW	MYB	PPR	GTY	IRP	MCH	BRI	DAR	RCH	DOV	CLT	CAR	MEM	PHO	HOM				128th	46	
2005	NEMCO Motorsports	7	Chevy	DAY	CAL	MXC; 26	LVS	ATL	NSH	BRI	TEX	PHO	TAL	DAR	RCH	CLT	DOV	NSH	KEN	MLW	DAY	CHI	NHA	PPR	GTY	IRP	GLN; 24	MCH	BRI	CAL	RCH	DOV	KAN	CLT	MEM	TEX	PHO	HOM	96th	176	
2006	Mac Hill Motorsports	56	Dodge	DAY	CAL	MXC; 20	LVS	ATL	BRI	TEX	NSH																												78th	316	
2006	Mac Hill Motorsports	56	Chevy									PHO; DNQ	TAL	RCH	DAR	CLT	DOV																						78th	316	
2006	Curb Agajanian Performance Group	43	Dodge															NSH; 28	KEN; 30	MLW	DAY	CHI	NHA	MAR	GTY	IRP	GLN; 34	MCH	BRI	CAL	RCH; DNQ	DOV	KAN	CLT	MEM	TEX	PHO	HOM	78th	316	
2008	MSRP Motorsports	90	Chevy	DAY	CAL	LVS	ATL	BRI	NSH	TEX	PHO	MXC; 40	TAL	RCH	DAR	CLT	DOV	NSH	KEN	MLW	NHA	DAY	CHI	GTY	IRP	CGV	GLN; 43	MCH	BRI	CAL	RCH	DOV	KAN	CLT	MEM	TEX	PHO	HOM	123rd	77	
2009	R3 Motorsports	23	Chevy	DAY	CAL	LVS	BRI	TEX	NSH	PHO	TAL	RCH	DAR	CLT	DOV	NSH	KEN	MLW	NHA	DAY	CHI	GTY	IRP	IOW	GLN; 31														114th	144	
2009	MSRP Motorsports	90	Chevy																						GLN; QL^{†}	MCH	BRI	CGV; 41	ATL	RCH	DOV	KAN	CAL	CLT	MEM	TEX			114th	144	
2009	JTG Daugherty Racing	47	Toyota																																		PHO; 43	HOM	114th	144	
2011	Rick Ware Racing	75	Ford	DAY	PHO	LVS	BRI	CAL	TEX	TAL	NSH	RCH	DAR	DOV	IOW	CLT	CHI	MCH	ROA	DAY	KEN	NHA	NSH	IRP	IOW	GLN; QL^{‡}	CGV; QL^{‡}	BRI	ATL	RCH	CHI	DOV	KAN	CLT	TEX	PHO	HOM		NA	-	
2012	Rick Ware Racing	15	Chevy	DAY	PHO	LVS	BRI	CAL	TEX	RCH	TAL	DAR	IOW	CLT	DOV	MCH	ROA	KEN	DAY	NHA	CHI	IND	IOW	GLN; 37	CGV; 39	BRI	ATL	RCH	CHI	KEN	DOV	CLT	KAN	TEX	PHO	HOM			97th	5	
2016	MBM Motorsports	40	Dodge	DAY	ATL	LVS	PHO	CAL	TEX	BRI	RCH	TAL	DOV	CLT	POC	MCH	IOW	DAY	KEN	NHA	IND	IOW	GLN; 40	MOH	BRI	ROA	DAR	RCH	CHI	KEN	DOV	CLT	KAN	TEX	PHO	HOM			84th	1	
^{†} - Qualified for Mike Bliss· ^{‡} - Qualified for Tomy Drissi

==== K&N Pro Series West ====
NASCAR K&N Pro Series West results
Year	Team	No.	Make	1	2	3	4	5	6	7	8	9	10	11	12	13	14	15	NKNPSC	Pts	Ref
2006	Bill McAnally Racing	07	Chevy	PHO	PHO; 12	S99	IRW	SON	DCS	IRW	EVG	S99	CAL	CTS	AMP				60th	127	
2013	Steve Tarpley	48	Chevy	PHO	S99	BIR	IOW	L44	SON; 33	CNS	IOW	EVG	SPO	MMP	SMP	AAS	KCR	PHO	73rd	11	

^{*} Season still in progress
^{1} Ineligible for series points

=== 24 Hours of Daytona ===
(key)

24 Hours of Daytona results
Year	Class	No	Team	Car	Co-drivers	Laps	Position	Class Pos.
2012	GT	15	(United States) Rick Ware Racing	Ford Mustang	(United States) Timmy Hill (United States) Jeffrey Earnhardt (United States) Doug Harrington (United States) John Ware	256	51 ^{DNF}	38 ^{DNF}
