= Brian Simo =

American racing driver

- Born: October 1, 1959 (age 67); Highland Park, Illinois, U.S.
- Achievements: 2000 Trans-Am Series champion

NASCAR Cup Series career
- 7 races run over 6 years
- 2011 position: 49th
- Best finish: 49th (2011)
- First race: 2000 Save Mart/Kragen 350 (Sonoma)
- Last race: 2011 Toyota/Save Mart 350 (Sonoma)
Wins	Top tens	Poles
0	1	0

NASCAR O'Reilly Auto Parts Series career
- 6 races run over 4 years
- 2008 position: 82nd
- Best finish: 82nd (2008)
- First race: 1997 Lysol 200 (Watkins Glen)
- Last race: 2008 Zippo 200 at the Glen (Watkins Glen)
Wins	Top tens	Poles
0	0	0
- Statistics up to date as of December 2, 2011.

Brian Simo (pronounced "see-mow") (born October 1, 1959) is an American former professional racing driver and businessman. He is a veteran of Trans-Am racing and the owner and founder of the No Fear clothing line. In addition, he competed on the NASCAR circuit as a road course ringer from 1997 to 2012. This included his run in the No. 33 Chevrolet for Richard Childress Racing in the Nextel Cup Series race at Infineon Raceway in 2005, where he finished in tenth place.

== Racing career ==
=== NASCAR ===
==== Sprint Cup Series ====
Simo attempted his first NASCAR Cup Series races in 2000 with Donlavey Racing. He raced the No. 90 Ford to a 36th-place finish and failed to qualify the car at Watkins Glen. For the 2001 season, Simo again returned to the same car and team to run the road course races. He earned a fifteenth place starting spot at Infineon, and finished 42nd after transmission failure. At Watkins Glen, Simo qualified 42nd and ended up finishing the race in 37th after a crash. Simo did not return to the Sprint Cup Series until 2005 when he raced the No. 33 Richard Childress Racing Chevrolet at Infineon. He started the race in 22nd and worked his way up to tenth place to finish the race with his first and only top-ten. In 2006, Simo was selected to run the road course events for Front Row Motorsports. He was unable to qualify their No. 61 Chevrolet at Infineon, however he did qualify the No. 34 Chevrolet for Watkins Glen, his race ended early and finished 41st after being involved in a crash. For 2007, Simo attempted both road courses for Front Row Motorsports in the No. 37 Dodge, however he was unable to qualify. Simo again drove for FRM in 2008 for the road course races, but in the No. 34 Ford/Chevy instead. He finished 43rd at Infineon and failed to qualify for Watkins Glen due to rain. He attempted both road course races for Tommy Baldwin in 2009, but did not qualify for both. He returned at Infineon in 2010 for Tommy Baldwin, but did not qualify. He raced for Whitney Motorsports in 2011. He made the race at Infineon in the No. 81, but did not qualify at Watkins Glen in the 46. He attempted Sonoma in 2012 for Inception Motorsports, but was the only car not to qualify.

==== Nationwide Series ====
Simo's first start in the Nationwide would come in the No. 03 Chevrolet. He started the race in the 20th position, but had a driveshaft failure after eight laps and ended the race in the 40th position. In 1998, he failed to qualify for the Gumout Long Life Formula 200 his only oval attempt. Simo returned to the series in 2006 with Frank Cicci Racing and raced the No 34 Chevrolet at Watkins Glen to a 22nd-place finish. In 2007, he returned to race for Frank Cicci Racing in their No. 34 Chevrolet at Mexico City. Simo started the race in 39th and provided another 22nd-place finish for the team. For the 2008 season, Simo was selected to run the road courses for Front Row Motorsports in their No. 24 Chevrolet instead of the team's normal driver Eric McClure. His first start came at Mexico City and he finished 28th in the race. He competed in the two other road course races on the schedule for FRM, those being Montreal where he finished 30th, and 20th at Watkins Glen.

== Motorsports career results ==
=== SCCA National Championship Runoffs ===
Year	Track	Car	Engine	Class	Finish	Start	Status
1990	Road Atlanta	Chevrolet Camaro	Chevrolet	Showroom Stock GT	24	23	Retired
1991	Road Atlanta	Chevrolet Camaro	Chevrolet	Showroom Stock GT	30	12	Retired

=== NASCAR ===
(key) (Bold – Pole position awarded by qualifying time. Italics – Pole position earned by points standings or practice time. * – Most laps led.)

==== Sprint Cup Series ====
NASCAR Sprint Cup Series results
Year	Team	No.	Make	1	2	3	4	5	6	7	8	9	10	11	12	13	14	15	16	17	18	19	20	21	22	23	24	25	26	27	28	29	30	31	32	33	34	35	36	NSCC	Pts	Ref
2000	Donlavey Racing	90	Ford	DAY	CAR	LVS	ATL	DAR	BRI	TEX	MAR	TAL	CAL	RCH	CLT	DOV	MCH	POC	SON; 36	DAY	NHA	POC	IND	GLN; DNQ	MCH	BRI	DAR	RCH	NHA	DOV	MAR	CLT	TAL	CAR	PHO	HOM	ATL			66th	55	
2001	Donlavey Racing	90	Ford	DAY	CAR	LVS	ATL	DAR	BRI	TEX	MAR	TAL	CAL	RCH	CLT	DOV	MCH	POC	SON; 42	DAY	CHI	NHA	POC	IND	GLN; 37	MCH	BRI	DAR	RCH	DOV	KAN	CLT	MAR	TAL	PHO	CAR	HOM	ATL	NHA	61st	89	
2005	Richard Childress Racing	33	Chevy	DAY	CAL	LVS	ATL	BRI	MAR	TEX	PHO	TAL	DAR	RCH	CLT	DOV	POC	MCH	SON; 10	DAY	CHI	NHA	POC	IND	GLN	MCH	BRI	CAL	RCH	NHA	DOV	TAL	KAN	CLT	MAR	ATL	TEX	PHO	HOM	65th	134	
2006	Front Row Motorsports	61	Chevy	DAY	CAL	LVS	ATL	BRI	MAR	TEX	PHO	TAL	RCH	DAR	CLT	DOV	POC	MCH	SON; DNQ	DAY	CHI	NHA	POC	IND																71st	40	
2006	Front Row Motorsports	34	Chevy																						GLN; 41	MCH	BRI	CAL	RCH	NHA	DOV	KAN	TAL	CLT	MAR	ATL	TEX	PHO	HOM	71st	40	
2007	Front Row Motorsports	37	Dodge	DAY	CAL	LVS	ATL	BRI	MAR	TEX	PHO	TAL	RCH	DAR	CLT	DOV	POC	MCH	SON; DNQ	NHA	DAY	CHI	IND	POC	GLN; DNQ	MCH	BRI	CAL	RCH	NHA	DOV	KAN	TAL	CLT	MAR	ATL	TEX	PHO	HOM	N/A	0	
2008	Front Row Motorsports	34	Ford	DAY	CAL	LVS	ATL	BRI	MAR	TEX	PHO	TAL	RCH	DAR	CLT	DOV	POC	MCH	SON; 43	NHA	DAY	CHI	IND	POC																71st	34	
2008	Front Row Motorsports	34	Chevy																						GLN; DNQ	MCH	BRI	CAL	RCH	NHA	DOV	KAN	TAL	CLT	MAR	ATL	TEX	PHO	HOM	71st	34	
2009	Tommy Baldwin Racing	36	Toyota	DAY	CAL	LVS	ATL	BRI	MAR	TEX	PHO	TAL	RCH	DAR	CLT	DOV	POC	MCH	SON; DNQ	NHA	DAY	CHI	IND	POC	GLN; DNQ	MCH	BRI	ATL	RCH	NHA	DOV	KAN	CAL	CLT	MAR	TAL	TEX	PHO	HOM	N/A	0	
2010	Tommy Baldwin Racing	36	Chevy	DAY	CAL	LVS	ATL	BRI	MAR	PHO	TEX	TAL	RCH	DAR	DOV	CLT	POC	MCH	SON; DNQ	NHA	DAY	CHI	IND	POC	GLN	MCH	BRI	ATL	RCH	NHA	DOV	KAN	CAL	CLT	MAR	TAL	TEX	PHO	HOM	N/A	0	
2011	Whitney Motorsports	81	Ford	DAY	PHO	LVS	BRI	CAL	MAR	TEX	TAL	RCH	DAR	DOV	CLT	KAN	POC	MCH	SON; 33	DAY	KEN	NHA	IND	POC																49th	11	
2011	Whitney Motorsports	46	Ford																						GLN; DNQ	MCH	BRI	ATL	RCH	CHI	NHA	DOV	KAN	CLT	TAL	MAR	TEX	PHO	HOM	49th	11	
2012	Inception Motorsports	30	Toyota	DAY	PHO	LVS	BRI	CAL	MAR	TEX	KAN	RCH	TAL	DAR	CLT	DOV	POC	MCH	SON; DNQ	KEN	DAY	NHA	IND	POC	GLN	MCH	BRI	ATL	RCH	CHI	NHA	DOV	TAL	CLT	KAN	MAR	TEX	PHO	HOM	N/A	0	

==== Nationwide Series ====
NASCAR Nationwide Series results
Year	Team	No.	Make	1	2	3	4	5	6	7	8	9	10	11	12	13	14	15	16	17	18	19	20	21	22	23	24	25	26	27	28	29	30	31	32	33	34	35	NNSC	Pts	Ref
1997	Reg Laporte	03	Chevy	DAY	CAR	RCH	ATL	LVS	DAR	HCY	TEX	BRI	NSV	TAL	NHA	NZH	CLT	DOV	SBO	GLN; 40	MLW	MYB	GTY	IRP	MCH	BRI	DAR	RCH	DOV	CLT	CAL	CAR	HOM						123rd	0	
1998	Doug Innis	03	Chevy	DAY	CAR	LVS	NSV	DAR	BRI	TEX	HCY	TAL	NHA; DNQ	NZH	CLT	DOV	RCH	PPR	GLN	MLW	MYB	CAL	SBO	IRP	MCH	BRI	DAR	RCH	DOV	CLT	GTY	CAR	ATL	HOM					N/A	0	
2006	Frank Cicci Racing	34	Chevy	DAY	CAL	MXC	LVS	ATL	BRI	TEX	NSH	PHO	TAL	RCH	DAR	CLT	DOV	NSH	KEN	MLW	DAY	CHI	NHA	MAR	GTY	IRP	GLN; 22	MCH	BRI	CAL	RCH	DOV	KAN	CLT	MEM	TEX	PHO	HOM	113th	97	
2007	Frank Cicci Racing	34	Chevy	DAY	CAL	MXC; 22	LVS	ATL	BRI	NSH	TEX	PHO	TAL	RCH	DAR	CLT	DOV	NSH	KEN	MLW	NHA	DAY	CHI	GTY	IRP	CGV	GLN	MCH	BRI	CAL	RCH	DOV	KAN	CLT	MEM	TEX	PHO	HOM	128th	97	
2008	Front Row Motorsports	24	Chevy	DAY	CAL	LVS	ATL	BRI	NSH	TEX	PHO	MXC; 28	TAL	RCH	DAR	CLT	DOV	NSH	KEN	MLW	NHA	DAY	CHI	GTY	IRP	CGV; 30	GLN; 20	MCH	BRI	CAL	RCH	DOV	KAN	CLT	MEM	TEX	PHO	HOM	82nd	262	
2011	R3 Motorsports	50	Chevy	DAY	PHO	LVS	BRI	CAL	TEX	TAL	NSH	RCH	DAR	DOV	IOW	CLT	CHI	MCH	ROA	DAY	KEN	NHA	NSH	IRP	IOW	GLN; DNQ	CGV	BRI	ATL	RCH	CHI	DOV	KAN	CLT	TEX	PHO	HOM		N/A	0	

==== Busch North Series ====
NASCAR Busch North Series results
Year	Team	No.	Make	1	2	3	4	5	6	7	8	9	10	11	12	13	14	15	16	17	18	19	20	21	22	NBNSC	Pts	Ref
1997	A. J. Parker	03	Chevy	DAY	LEE	JEN	NHA	NZH	HOL	NHA	STA	BEE	TMP	NZH	TIO	NHA	STA	THU	GLN; 36	EPP	RPS	BEE	TMP	NHA	LRP	96th	55	
1998	A. J. Parker	03	Chevy	LEE	RPS	NHA	NZH	HOL	GLN	STA	NHA	DOV	STA	NHA	GLN; 8	EPP	JEN	NHA	THU	TMP	BEE	LRP; 30				61st	215	
