= David Mayhew (racing driver) =

American racing driver (born 1982)

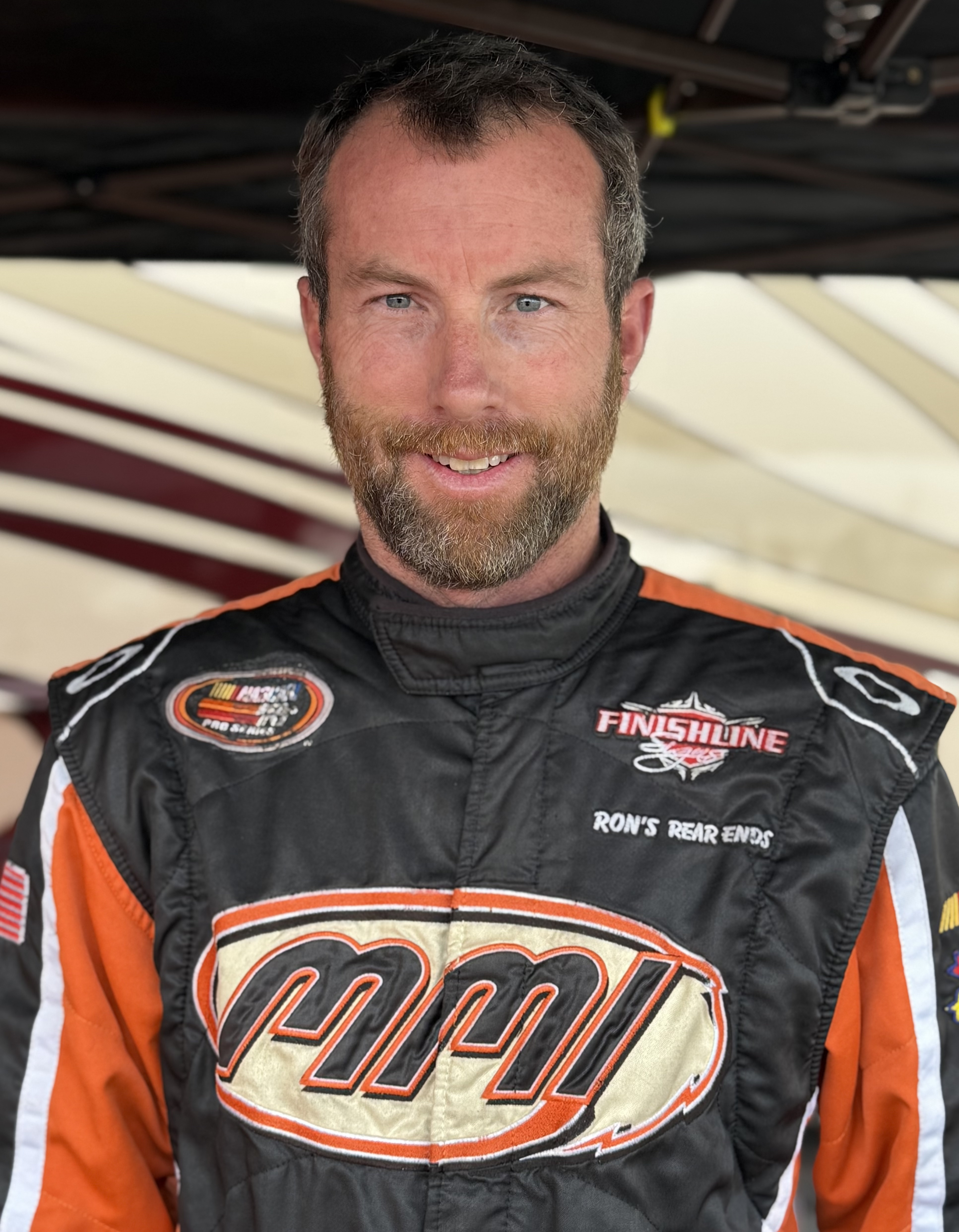
- Mayhew in 2026
- Born: February 19, 1982 (age 44) Atascadero, California, U.S.

NASCAR K&N Pro Series West career
- Debut season: 2007
- Current team: Steve McGowan Motorsports
- Car number: 17
- Former teams: Golden Gate Racing
- Starts: 106
- Wins: 10
- Poles: 13
- Best finish: 2nd in 2010

Awards
- 2006: NASCAR Southwest Division Rookie of the Year

NASCAR Cup Series career
- 1 race run over 1 year
- Best finish: 57th (2012)
- First race: 2012 Toyota/Save Mart 350 (Sonoma)
Wins	Top tens	Poles
0	0	0

NASCAR O'Reilly Auto Parts Series career
- 1 race run over 1 year
- Best finish: 116th (2011)
- First race: 2011 U.S. Cellular 250 (Iowa)
Wins	Top tens	Poles
0	1	0

NASCAR FedEx Freight Truck Series career
- 13 races run over 3 years
- Best finish: 33rd (2011)
- First race: 2010 Smith's 350 (Las Vegas)
- Last race: 2012 Lucas Oil 150 (Phoenix)
Wins	Top tens	Poles
0	4	1
- Statistics up to date as of June 21, 2014.

David Wayne Mayhew (born February 19, 1982) is an American professional stock car racing driver. He last competed part-time in the NASCAR K&N Pro Series West, driving the No. 17 Chevrolet SS for Golden Gate Racing. He is the father of fellow racing driver Taylor Mayhew.

== Racing career ==
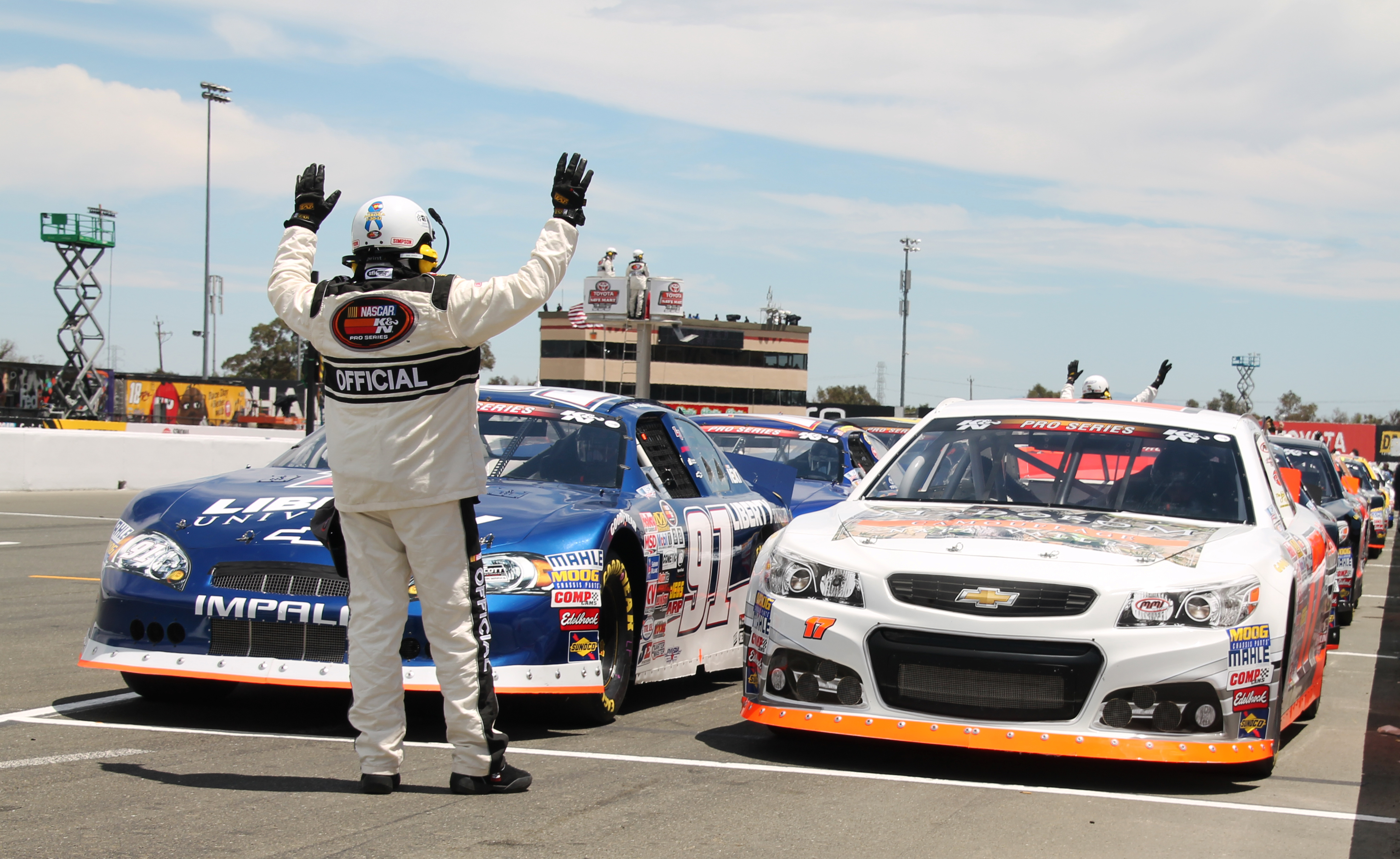
Mayhew's car (right) prior to the 2015 K&N Pro Series West race at Sonoma Raceway

A five-time winner in the International Kart Federation National Championships, Mayhew competed in the U.S. F2000 National Championship before switching to stock cars; in 2006, he won the NASCAR AutoZone Elite Division, Southwest Series Rookie of the Year award. Mayhew joined Richard Childress Racing as a development driver in 2007, competing in the K&N Pro Series West for Golden Gate Racing through the 2008 season; he was released from the team at the end of the year, and replaced by Blake Koch.

Driving for Steve McGowen in 2009, Mayhew scored his first win in the series at Iowa Speedway, finishing the season sixth in points with two wins; despite only scoring one win in 2010, he finished second in points. In 2010, Mayhew also made his debut in the NASCAR Camping World Truck Series, driving Kevin Harvick Incorporated equipment operated by McGowen; he ran a limited schedule in the series in that year and in 2011, winning a pole at Iowa Speedway in the latter year. Two of Mayhew's 2011 races were driven for KHI itself; in both races he finished third, his best career finish in the series. He also competed in one Nationwide Series race for KHI in 2011, finishing tenth in his first start in the series. Also in 2011, Mayhew qualified the No. 66 HP Racing Toyota for the Sprint Cup Series' Toyota/Save Mart 350 in place of regular driver Michael McDowell, who drove the car in the race.

Returning to the K&N Pro Series West in 2012 after running a limited schedule in the series in 2011, Mayhew led all 50 laps of the opening race of the 2012 season at Phoenix International Raceway. He scored top-ten finishes in each of the season's first seven races; in June, he was signed by Phil Parsons Racing to race the No. 98 Sprint Cup car in the 2012 Toyota/Save Mart 350 at Infineon Raceway; Mayhew finished 40th in the event.

Mayhew was also asked by Kevin Harvick to stand by as a substitute driver during the summer of 2012, on call to replace Harvick in the No. 29 Chevrolet if needed as Harvick and wife DeLana expected their first child. In the fall of that year, he competed for Brad Keselowski Racing in four races in the Camping World Truck Series.

In 2014, Mayhew substituted for J. J. Yeley in the No. 44 Xxxtreme Motorsport Chevy in Sprint Cup Series qualifying at Sonoma.

== Motorsports career results ==
=== NASCAR ===
(key) (Bold – Pole position awarded by qualifying time. Italics – Pole position earned by points standings or practice time. * – Most laps led.)

==== Sprint Cup Series ====
NASCAR Sprint Cup Series results
Year	Team	No.	Make	1	2	3	4	5	6	7	8	9	10	11	12	13	14	15	16	17	18	19	20	21	22	23	24	25	26	27	28	29	30	31	32	33	34	35	36	NSCC	Pts	Ref
2011	HP Racing	66	Toyota	DAY	PHO	LVS	BRI	CAL	MAR	TEX	TAL	RCH	DAR	DOV	CLT	KAN	POC	MCH	SON; QL^{†}	DAY	KEN	NHA	IND	POC	GLN	MCH	BRI	ATL	RCH	CHI	NHA	DOV	KAN	CLT	TAL	MAR	TEX	PHO	HOM	NA	-	
2012	Phil Parsons Racing	98	Ford	DAY	PHO	LVS	BRI	CAL	MAR	TEX	KAN	RCH	TAL	DAR	CLT	DOV	POC	MCH	SON; 40	KEN	DAY	NHA	IND	POC	GLN	MCH	BRI	ATL	RCH	CHI	NHA	DOV	TAL	CHA	KAN	MAR	TEX	PHO	HOM	57th	4	
2014	Xxxtreme Motorsport	44	Chevy	DAY	PHO	LVS	BRI	CAL	MAR	TEX	DAR	RCH	TAL	KAN	CLT	DOV	POC	MCH	SON; QL^{‡}	KEN	DAY	NHA	IND	POC	GLN	MCH	BRI	ATL	RCH	CHI	NHA	DOV	KAN	CLT	TAL	MAR	TEX	PHO	HOM	NA	-	
^{†} - Qualified for Michael McDowell· ^{‡} - Qualified for J. J. Yeley.

==== Nationwide Series ====
NASCAR Nationwide Series results
Year	Team	No.	Make	1	2	3	4	5	6	7	8	9	10	11	12	13	14	15	16	17	18	19	20	21	22	23	24	25	26	27	28	29	30	31	32	33	34	NNSC	Pts	Ref
2011	Kevin Harvick Incorporated	33	Chevy	DAY	PHO	LVS	BRI	CAL	TEX	TAL	NSH	RCH	DAR	DOV	IOW	CLT	CHI	MCH	ROA	DAY	KEN	NHA	NSH	IRP	IOW; 10	GLN	CGV	BRI	ATL	RCH	CHI	DOV	KAN	CLT	TEX	PHO	HOM	116th^{1}	0^{1}	

==== Camping World Truck Series ====
NASCAR Camping World Truck Series results
Year	Team	No.	Make	1	2	3	4	5	6	7	8	9	10	11	12	13	14	15	16	17	18	19	20	21	22	23	24	25	NCWTC	Pts	Ref
2010	Steve McGowan Motorsports	19	Chevy	DAY	ATL	MAR	NSH	KAN	DOV	CLT	TEX	MCH	IOW	GTY	IRP	POC	NSH	DAR	BRI	CHI	KEN	NHA	LVS; 15	MAR	TAL	TEX	PHO; 16	HOM; 14	91st	123	
2011	Steve McGowan Motorsports	19	Chevy	DAY	PHO; 29	DAR	MAR	NSH	DOV	CLT	KAN								BRI; 12	ATL	CHI	NHA	KEN	LVS; 7	TAL	MAR	TEX	HOM	33rd	135	
2011	Kevin Harvick Incorporated	2	Chevy									TEX; 3	KEN	**IOW**; 3	NSH	IRP	POC	MCH											33rd	135	
2012	Brad Keselowski Racing	19	Ram	DAY	MAR	CAR	KAN	CLT	DOV	TEX	KEN	IOW	CHI	POC	MCH	BRI	ATL	IOW; 16	KEN; 26				TEX; 24	PHO; 12	HOM				89th	0^{1}	
2012	Kyle Busch Motorsports	18	Toyota																	LVS; 9	TAL	MAR							89th	0^{1}	

==== K&N Pro Series East ====
NASCAR K&N Pro Series East results
Year	Team	No.	Make	1	2	3	4	5	6	7	8	9	10	11	12	13	14	NKNPSEC	Pts	Ref
2009	Steve McGowan Motorsports	19	Chevy	GRE	TRI	IOW	SBO	GLN	NHA	TMP	ADI	LRP	NHA; 27	DOV; 4				38th	252	
2012	Brenn McGowan	77	Chevy	BRI; 11	GRE	RCH	IOW	BGS	JFC	LGY	CNB	COL	IOW	NHA	DOV	GRE	CAR	57th	33	

==== K&N Pro Series West ====
NASCAR K&N Pro Series West results
Year	Team	No.	Make	1	2	3	4	5	6	7	8	9	10	11	12	13	14	15	NKNPSWC	Pts	Ref
2007	Golden Gate Racing	26	Chevy	CTS; 6	PHO; 30	AMP	ELK					IRW; 19	MMP						18th	930	
2007	Golden Gate Racing	6	Chevy					IOW; 9	CNS	SON	DCS								18th	930	
2007	Richard Childress Racing	21	Chevy											EVG; 15	CSR; 3	AMP; 2			18th	930	
2008	Richard Childress Racing	21	Chevy	AAS; 2	PHO; 30	CTS; 3	IOW; 22	CNS; 16	SON; 32	IRW; 8*	DCS; 4	EVG; 16	MMP; 8	IRW; 5	AMP; 2	AAS; 9			8th	1724	
2009	Steve McGowan Motorsports	17	Chevy	**CTS**; 6	AAS; 4	PHO; 14	MAD; 2	**IOW**; 1	DCS; 3	SON; 2	IRW; 7	**PIR**; 15	MMP; 23	CNS; 16	IOW; 1*	AAS			6th	1799	
2010	Steve McGowan Motorsports	17	Chevy	AAS; 4	PHO; 5	**IOW**; 1*	**DCS**; 2	SON; 23	IRW; 23	**PIR**; 4	MRP; 2*	CNS; 5	MMP; 15	AAS; 2	PHO; 7				2nd	1822	
2011	Steve McGowan Motorsports	17	Chevy	PHO; 9	AAS; 10	MMP; 5	IOW; 2	LVS; 23	SON; 24	IRW; 8	EVG	PIR; 12	CNS	MRP	SPO	AAS	PHO; 10		14th	1195	
2012	Steve McGowan Motorsports	17	Chevy	**PHO**; 1	LHC; 2	MMP; 9	S99; 3	**IOW**; 10	BIR; 5	LVS; 4	SON; 9	EVG; 5	CNS; 8	IOW; 4	PIR; 6	SMP	AAS; 3	PHO; 7	5th	548	
2013	Steve McGowan Motorsports	17	Chevy	PHO; 25	S99	BIR	IOW	L44	SON; 4	CNS	IOW; 11	EVG	SPO	MMP	SMP	AAS	KCR; 4	PHO; 4	18th	173	
2014	Steve McGowan Motorsports	17	Chevy	PHO; 24	IRW; 2	**S99**; 1*	IOW; 1	KCR; 3	SON; 21	SLS; 5*	**CNS**; 14	**IOW**; 2	EVG; 1	KCR; 10	MMP; 1	AAS; 5	PHO; 6		3rd	540	
2015	Steve McGowan Motorsports	17	Chevy	KCR; 2	IRW; 6	TUS; 14	IOW; 4	**SHA**; 20*	**SON**; 1	SLS; 10	IOW; 15	EVG; 1*	CNS; 4	MER; 21	AAS; 4	PHO; 29			6th	458	
2016	Steve McGowan Motorsports	17	Chevy	IRW	KCR; 6	TUS	OSS	CNS	SON; 30	SLS	IOW	EVG	DCS	MMP	MMP	MER	AAS		34th	54	
2017	Steve McGowan Motorsports	17	Chevy	TUS	KCR; 5	IRW	IRW	SPO	OSS	CNS	SON; 3	IOW	EVG	DCS	MER	AAS	KCR		26th	80	
2018	Steve McGowan Motorsports	17	Chevy	KCR; 12	TUS	TUS	OSS	CNS	SON; 11	DCS	IOW	EVG	GTW	LVS	MER	AAS	KCR; 4		21st	105	
2019	Steve McGowan Motorsports	17	Chevy	LVS	IRW	TUS	TUS	CNS	SON; 5	DCS	IOW	EVG	GTW	MER	AAS	KCR	PHO		40th	39	

==== Autozone Elite Division, Southwest Series ====
Autozone Elite Division, Southwest Series results
Year	Team	No.	Make	1	2	3	4	5	6	7	8	9	10	11	12	13	14	NAEDSSC	Pts	Ref
2005	Mayhew Motorsports	25	Pontiac	PHO	MMR; 8	S99; 11	MMR; 24	CNS	IRW; 14									24th	624	
2005	Mayhew Motorsports	25	Chevy							SON; 39	S99	PPR	CNS	IRW; 23	SHA	MMR	PHO	24th	624	
2006	Mayhew Motorsports	26	Chevy	PHO; 19			AMP; 12	S99; 8	IRW; 11	CNS; 3	AMP; 5							5th	1113	
2006	Mayhew Motorsports	25	Chevy		SHA; 9	CNS; 6												5th	1113	

* Season still in progress
^{1} Ineligible for series points
