= 2012 Toyota/Save Mart 350 =

Race details
- Race 16 of 36 in the 2012 NASCAR Sprint Cup Series
- Date: June 24, 2012
- Location: Sonoma Raceway Sonoma, California
- Course: Permanent racing facility
- Course length: 1.99 miles (3.2 km)
- Distance: 112 laps, 222.88 mi (358.69 km)
- Scheduled distance: 110 laps, 218.9 mi (352.285 km)
- Weather: Temperatures reaching up to 73.9 °F (23.3 °C); wind speeds up to 17.1 miles per hour (27.5 km/h)
- Average speed: 83.624 miles per hour (134.580 km/h)

Pole position
Driver	Marcos Ambrose	Richard Petty Motorsports
- Time: 75.203

Most laps led
Driver	Clint Bowyer	Michael Waltrip Racing
- Laps: 71

Winner
No. 15	Clint Bowyer	Michael Waltrip Racing

Television in the United States
- Network: TNT
- Announcers: Adam Alexander, Wally Dallenbach Jr. and Kyle Petty

The 2012 Toyota/Save Mart 350 was a NASCAR Sprint Cup Series stock car race held on June 24, 2012, at Sonoma Raceway in Sonoma, California. Contested over 110 laps, it was the sixteenth race of the 2012 NASCAR Sprint Cup Series season and the first of two road course competitions on the schedule. Clint Bowyer of Michael Waltrip Racing took his first win of the season, while Tony Stewart finished second and Kurt Busch finished third.

== Report ==
=== Background ===
Sonoma Raceway is one of two road courses to hold NASCAR races, the other being Watkins Glen International. The standard road course at Infineon Raceway is a 12-turn course that is 2.52 miles (4.06 km) long; the track was modified in 1998, adding the Chute, which bypassed turns 5 and 6, shortening the course to 1.95 miles (3.14 km). The Chute was only used for NASCAR events such as this race, and was criticized by many drivers, who preferred the full layout. In 2001, it was replaced with a 70-degree turn, 4A, bringing the track to its current dimensions of 1.99 miles (3.20 km).

Before the race, Matt Kenseth led the Drivers' Championship with 565 points, and Dale Earnhardt Jr. stood in second with 561. Greg Biffle was third in the Drivers' Championship with 548, sixteen points ahead of Jimmie Johnson and thirty-four ahead of Denny Hamlin in fourth and fifth. Kevin Harvick, with 504, was seven points ahead of Martin Truex Jr., as Tony Stewart with 491 points, was ten ahead of Clint Bowyer and thirty-three in front of Brad Keselowski. In the Manufacturers' Championship, Chevrolet was leading with 105 points, eighteen points ahead of Toyota. Ford, with 77 points, was twenty-eight points ahead of Dodge in the battle for third. Kurt Busch was the defending race winner.

Five teams chose to temporarily replace their regular drivers with road course ringers. One of which was Tommy Baldwin Racing, who replaced regular David Reutimann with Tomy Drissi, while another was FAS Lane Racing who chose Boris Said to replace regular drivers, Reed Sorenson and Ken Schrader. Humphrey Smith Racing also changed drivers, with Mike Bliss, racing at Road America in the Nationwide Series on the weekend, being replaced with Chris Cook, while Phil Parsons Racing replaced Michael McDowell with David Mayhew and Inception Motorsports co-owner David Stremme stepped aside in favor of Brian Simo. Robby Gordon also qualified for his first race since Auto Club Speedway.

=== Practice and qualifying ===
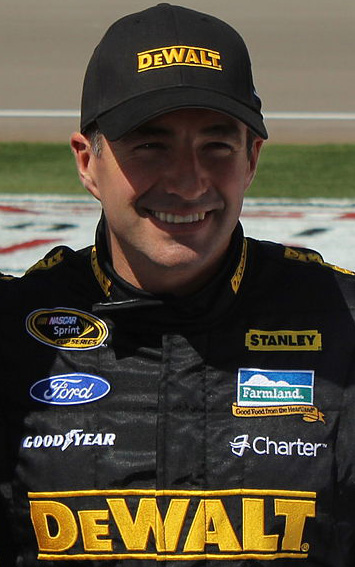
Marcos Ambrose, from Richard Petty Motorsports, won the pole position

Three practice sessions were scheduled to be held before the Sunday race—one on June 22, 2012, and two on June 23, 2012. The first session lasted 90 minutes. The second session was 45 minutes, while the final session finished after 75 minutes. Jeff Gordon was quickest with a time of 75.653 seconds in the first session, less than two-tenths of a second faster than Truex Jr. Bowyer was just off Truex Jr.'s pace, followed by Joey Logano, Kyle Busch, and Ryan Newman. Marcos Ambrose was seventh, still within a second of Gordon's time.

"I was hiding under the truck. Jeff is such a talented road racer. He's one of the world's best road racers. I knew he had a great car from the lap he put down in practice. I was very nervous to watch him go."

— Marcos Ambrose, following the qualifying session.

Forty-four cars were entered for qualifying, but only forty-three could qualify for the race because of NASCAR's qualifying procedure. Ambrose clinched the second pole position of his career, with a record setting time of 75.203 seconds. He was joined on the front row of the grid by Gordon. Johnson qualified third, Biffle took fourth, and Truex Jr. started fifth. Bowyer, Kyle Busch, Kurt Busch, Kenseth and Newman rounded out the top ten. The driver that failed to qualify for the race was Brian Simo. Following the qualifying session, Ambrose stated, "I beat myself up here in 2010.It was nothing to do with the car or the track. It was me. I know what not to do on the last restart." Afterward, third-placed Johnson commented, "It was on edge the whole lap. I don't want to drive 110 laps the way it drove today."

In the second practice session, Gordon remained quickest with a time of 75.961 seconds. Ambrose, with a time of 76.718, was second quickest, ahead of Allmendinger, Juan Pablo Montoya, and Keselowski. Kyle Busch, Johnson, Truex Jr., Bowyer, and McMurray completed the first ten positions. Gordon continued to be quickest through the third practice session with a time of 76.846, 0.885 slower than his fastest lap during the second session. Biffle was second quickest in the session, while Montoya was scored third. Johnson followed in the fourth position ahead of Allmendinger, Hamlin and Edwards. Truex Jr., Kahne and Kyle Busch rounded out the first ten positions in eighth, ninth and tenth, respectively.

=== Race ===
The race, the fifteenth in the season, began at 3:21 p.m. EDT and was televised live in the United States on TNT. The conditions on the grid were dry before the race with the air temperature around 74 °F (23 °C). Track minister Tim Boeve began pre-race ceremonies, by giving the invocation. Next, University of California Straw Hat Band performed the national anthem, while Tony LaRussa and Toby Appleton, a Toyota Military Hero, gave the command for drivers to start their engines. During the pace laps, David Gilliland had to start last on the grid after missing the mandatory drivers meeting. After leading 13 laps, Gordon would reach the 23,000 career laps led mark, the most of any current Sprint Cup Series driver.

== Results ==
=== Qualifying ===
Grid	No.	Driver	Team	Manufacturer	Time	Speed
1	9	Marcos Ambrose	Richard Petty Motorsports	Ford	75.203	95.262
2	24	Jeff Gordon	Hendrick Motorsports	Chevrolet	75.357	95.607
3	48	Jimmie Johnson	Hendrick Motorsports	Chevrolet	75.574	94.975
4	16	Greg Biffle	Roush-Fenway Racing	Ford	75.632	94.722
5	56	Martin Truex Jr.	Michael Waltrip Racing	Toyota	75.661	94.686
6	15	Clint Bowyer	Michael Waltrip Racing	Toyota	75.666	94.679
7	18	Kyle Busch	Joe Gibbs Racing	Toyota	75.704	94.632
8	51	Kurt Busch	Phoenix Racing	Chevrolet	75.764	94.557
9	17	Matt Kenseth	Roush-Fenway Racing	Ford	75.790	94.524
10	39	Ryan Newman	Stewart–Haas Racing	Chevrolet	75.802	94.509
11	99	Carl Edwards	Roush-Fenway Racing	Ford	75.807	94.503
12	42	Juan Pablo Montoya	Earnhardt Ganassi Racing	Chevrolet	75.955	94.319
13	2	Brad Keselowski	Penske Racing	Dodge	75.995	94.269
14	20	Joey Logano	Joe Gibbs Racing	Toyota	76.044	94.209
15	5	Kasey Kahne	Hendrick Motorsports	Chevrolet	76.046	94.206
16	11	Denny Hamlin	Joe Gibbs Racing	Toyota	76.052	94.199
17	22	A. J. Allmendinger	Penske Racing	Dodge	76.064	94.184
18	47	Bobby Labonte	JTG Daugherty Racing	Toyota	76.129	94.103
19	88	Dale Earnhardt Jr.	Hendrick Motorsports	Chevrolet	76.192	94.026
20	13	Casey Mears	Germain Racing	Ford	76.220	93.991
21	55	Brian Vickers	Michael Waltrip Racing	Toyota	76.254	93.949
22	95	Scott Speed	Leavine Family Racing	Ford	76.283	93.913
23	27	Paul Menard	Richard Childress Racing	Chevrolet	76.343	93.840
24	14	Tony Stewart	Stewart–Haas Racing	Chevrolet	76.356	93.824
25	1	Jamie McMurray	Earnhardt Ganassi Racing	Chevrolet	76.431	93.732
26	29	Kevin Harvick	Richard Childress Racing	Chevrolet	76.434	93.728
27	38	David Gilliland^{1}	Front Row Motorsports	Ford	76,601	93.524
28	32	Boris Said	FAS Lane Racing	Ford	76.811	93.268
29	34	David Ragan	Front Row Motorsports	Ford	76.895	93.166
30	43	Aric Almirola	Richard Petty Motorsports	Ford	76.906	93.153
31	78	Regan Smith	Furniture Row Racing	Chevrolet	76.979	93.064
32	36	Dave Blaney	Tommy Baldwin Racing	Chevrolet	77.062	92.964
33	98	David Mayhew	Phil Parsons Racing	Ford	77.171	92.833
34	7	Robby Gordon	Robby Gordon Motorsports	Dodge	77.396	92.563
35	31	Jeff Burton	Richard Childress Racing	Chevrolet	77.483	92.459
36	87	Joe Nemechek	NEMCO Motorsports	Toyota	77.751	92.140
37	19	Chris Cook	Humphrey Smith Racing	Toyota	77.805	92.076
38	49	J. J. Yeley	Robinson-Blakeney Racing	Toyota	77.931	91.927
39	93	Travis Kvapil	BK Racing	Toyota	78.009	91.836
40	26	Josh Wise	Front Row Motorsports	Ford	78.100	91.729
41	10	Tomy Drissi	Tommy Baldwin Racing	Chevrolet	79.091	90.579
42	83	Landon Cassill	BK Racing	Toyota	80.187	89.341
43	33	Stephen Leicht^{2}	Circle Sport Racing	Chevrolet	78.136	91.686
Failed to Qualify
	30	Brian Simo	Inception Motorsports	Toyota	78.658	91.078

Notes
^1 — David Gilliland started last on the grid because of missing the mandatory drivers meeting.
^2 — Stephen Leicht also had to start in the rear of the grid after his team changed engines.

=== Race results ===
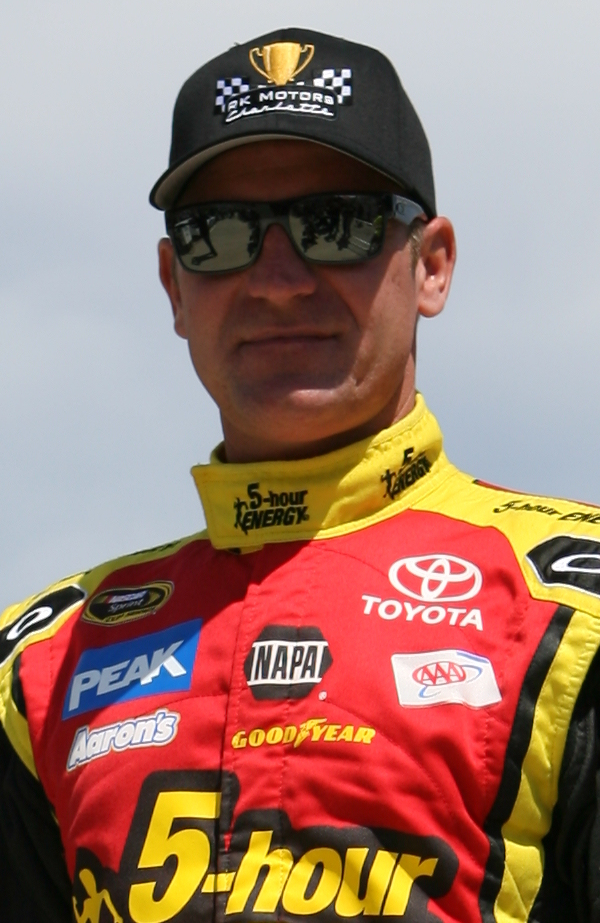
Clint Bowyer won the race.

Pos.	No.	Driver	Team	Manufacturer	Laps	Points
1	15	Clint Bowyer	Michael Waltrip Racing	Toyota	112	47
2	14	Tony Stewart	Stewart–Haas Racing	Chevrolet	112	42
3	51	Kurt Busch	Phoenix Racing	Chevrolet	112	42
4	55	Brian Vickers	Michael Waltrip Racing	Toyota	112	40
5	48	Jimmie Johnson	Hendrick Motorsports	Chevrolet	112	39
6	24	Jeff Gordon	Hendrick Motorsports	Chevrolet	112	39
7	16	Greg Biffle	Roush-Fenway Racing	Ford	112	37
8	9	Marcos Ambrose	Richard Petty Motorsports	Ford	112	37
9	22	A. J. Allmendinger	Penske Racing	Dodge	112	35
10	20	Joey Logano	Joe Gibbs Racing	Toyota	112	34
11	31	Jeff Burton	Richard Childress Racing	Chevrolet	112	33
12	2	Brad Keselowski	Penske Racing	Dodge	112	32
13	17	Matt Kenseth	Roush-Fenway Racing	Ford	112	31
14	5	Kasey Kahne	Hendrick Motorsports	Chevrolet	112	30
15	13	Casey Mears	Germain Racing	Ford	112	29
16	29	Kevin Harvick	Richard Childress Racing	Chevrolet	112	28
17	18	Kyle Busch	Joe Gibbs Racing	Toyota	112	27
18	39	Ryan Newman	Stewart–Haas Racing	Chevrolet	112	26
19	1	Jamie McMurray	Earnhardt Ganassi Racing	Chevrolet	112	25
20	27	Paul Menard	Richard Childress Racing	Chevrolet	112	24
21	99	Carl Edwards	Roush-Fenway Racing	Ford	112	23
22	56	Martin Truex Jr.	Michael Waltrip Racing	Toyota	112	23
23	88	Dale Earnhardt Jr.	Hendrick Motorsports	Chevrolet	112	21
24	47	Bobby Labonte	JTG Daugherty Racing	Toyota	111	20
25	95	Scott Speed	Leavine Family Racing	Ford	111	19
26	38	David Gilliland	Front Row Motorsports	Ford	111	18
27	34	David Ragan	Front Row Motorsports	Ford	111	17
28	43	Aric Almirola	Richard Petty Motorsports	Ford	110	16
29	32	Boris Said	FAS Lane Racing	Ford	110	0
30	26	Josh Wise	Front Row Motorsports	Ford	110	14
31	83	Landon Cassill	BK Racing	Toyota	110	13
32	78	Regan Smith	Furniture Row Racing	Chevrolet	109	12
33	49	J. J. Yeley	Robinson-Blakeney Racing	Toyota	107	11
34	42	Juan Pablo Montoya	Earnhardt Ganassi Racing	Chevrolet	107	10
35	11	Denny Hamlin	Joe Gibbs Racing	Toyota	98	9
36	93	Travis Kvapil	BK Racing	Toyota	92	8
37	36	Dave Blaney	Tommy Baldwin Racing	Chevrolet	84	7
38	10	Tomy Drissi	Tommy Baldwin Racing	Chevrolet	78	6
39	7	Robby Gordon	Robby Gordon Motorsports	Dodge	73	5
40	98	David Mayhew	Phil Parsons Racing	Ford	25	0
41	33	Stephen Leicht	Circle Sport Racing	Chevrolet	22	3
42	19	Chris Cook	Humphrey Smith Racing	Toyota	13	2
43	87	Joe Nemechek	NEMCO Motorsports	Toyota	1	0

== Standings after the race ==
Drivers' Championship standings

Pos	Driver	Points
1	Matt Kenseth	596
2	Greg Biffle	585
3	Dale Earnhardt Jr.	582
4	Jimmie Johnson	571
5	Tony Stewart	533

Manufacturers' Championship standings

Pos	Manufacturer	Points
1	Chevrolet	111
2	Toyota	93
3	Ford	81
4	Dodge	64

- Note: Only the top five positions are included for the driver standings.

Previous race: 2012 Quicken Loans 400	Sprint Cup Series; 2012 season	Next race: 2012 Quaker State 400
