= 2011 Toyota/Save Mart 350 =

Race details
- Race 16 of 36 in the 2011 NASCAR Sprint Cup Series
- The 2011 Toyota/Save Mart 350 program cover, featuring Marcos Ambrose at the front. Artwork by David Grandin.
- Date: June 26, 2011
- Official name: Toyota/Save Mart 350
- Location: Infineon Raceway Sonoma, California
- Course: Permanent racing facility
- Course length: 1.99 miles (3.2 km)
- Distance: 110 laps, 220 mi (350 km)
- Weather: Sunny with a high around 81; wind out of the SW at 13 mph.
- Average speed: 75.432 miles per hour (121.396 km/h)

Pole position
Driver	Joey Logano	Joe Gibbs Racing
- Time: 1:16.82

Most laps led
Driver	Kurt Busch	Penske Racing
- Laps: 75

Winner
No. 22	Kurt Busch	Penske Racing

Television in the United States
- Network: Turner Network Television
- Announcers: Adam Alexander, Wally Dallenbach Jr. and Kyle Petty

The 2011 Toyota/Save Mart 350 was a NASCAR Sprint Cup Series race held on June 26, 2011, at Infineon Raceway in Sonoma, California. Contested over 110 laps, it was the sixteenth race of the 2011 NASCAR Sprint Cup Series season and the first of two road course competitions on the schedule. The race was won by Kurt Busch for the Penske Racing team. Jeff Gordon finished second, and Carl Edwards clinched third.

There were five cautions and 13 lead changes among 9 different drivers throughout the course of the race, Kurt Busch's first win of the season. The result moved Kurt Busch to the fourth position in the Drivers' Championship. He remained 34 points behind first place driver Edwards and three ahead of Kyle Busch in seventh. In the Manufacturers' Championship, Chevrolet was leading with 108 points, 15 points ahead Ford and 24 ahead of Toyota. Dodge was fourth on 67 points with 20 races remaining in the season.

== Report ==
=== Background ===
Prior to the race, Carl Edwards led the Drivers' Championship with 532 points, and Kevin Harvick stood in second with 512 points. Dale Earnhardt Jr. was third in the Drivers' Championship with 505 points in a Chevrolet, Kyle Busch was fourth with 503 points, and Jimmie Johnson was in fifth also with 503 points. In the Manufacturers' Championship, Chevrolet was leading with 102 points, 13 points ahead of Ford. Toyota, with 81 points, was 23 ahead of Dodge in the battle for third.

The layout of Sonoma Raceway used by NASCAR for this race.

Infineon Raceway is one of two road courses to hold NASCAR races, the other being Watkins Glen International. The standard road course at Infineon Raceway is a 12-turn course that is 2.52 miles (4.06 km) long; the track was modified in 1998, adding the Chute, which bypassed turns 5 and 6, shortening the course to 1.95 miles (3.14 km). The Chute was only used for NASCAR events such as this race, and was criticized by many drivers, who preferred the full layout. In 2001, it was replaced with a 70-degree turn, 4A, bringing the track to its current dimensions of 1.99 miles (3.20 km).

#	Driver	Team	Make
00	David Reutimann	Michael Waltrip Racing	Toyota
1	Jamie McMurray	Earnhardt Ganassi Racing	Chevrolet
2	Brad Keselowski	Penske Racing	Dodge
4	Kasey Kahne	Red Bull Racing Team	Toyota
5	Mark Martin	Hendrick Motorsports	Chevrolet
6	David Ragan	Roush Fenway Racing	Ford
7	Robby Gordon	Robby Gordon Motorsports	Dodge
9	Marcos Ambrose	Richard Petty Motorsports	Ford
11	Denny Hamlin	Joe Gibbs Racing	Toyota
13	Casey Mears	Germain Racing	Toyota
14	Tony Stewart	Stewart Haas Racing	Chevrolet
16	Greg Biffle	Roush Fenway Racing	Ford
17	Matt Kenseth	Roush Fenway Racing	Ford
18	Kyle Busch	Joe Gibbs Racing	Toyota
20	Joey Logano	Joe Gibbs Racing	Toyota
22	Kurt Busch	Penske Racing	Dodge
24	Jeff Gordon	Hendrick Motorsports	Chevrolet
27	Paul Menard	Richard Childress Racing	Chevrolet
29	Kevin Harvick	Richard Childress Racing	Chevrolet
31	Jeff Burton	Richard Childress Racing	Chevrolet
32	Terry Labonte	FAS Lane Racing	Ford
33	Clint Bowyer	Richard Childress Racing	Chevrolet
34	David Gilliland	Front Row Motorsports	Ford
36	Dave Blaney	Tommy Baldwin Racing	Chevrolet
37	Chris Cook	Front Row Motorsports	Ford
38	Tony Ave	Front Row Motorsports	Ford
39	Ryan Newman	Stewart Haas Racing	Chevrolet
42	Juan Pablo Montoya	Earnhardt Ganassi Racing	Chevrolet
43	A. J. Allmendinger	Richard Petty Motorsports	Ford
46	Andy Pilgrim	Whitney Motorsports	Chevrolet
47	Bobby Labonte	JTG Daugherty Racing	Toyota
48	Jimmie Johnson	Hendrick Motorsports	Chevrolet
51	Boris Said	Phoenix Racing	Chevrolet
56	Martin Truex Jr.	Michael Waltrip Racing	Toyota
60	Mike Skinner	Germain Racing	Toyota
66	David Mayhew*	HP Racing	Toyota
71	Andy Lally	TRG Motorsports	Ford
77	P. J. Jones	Robby Gordon Motorsports	Dodge
81	Brian Simo	Whitney Motorsports	Chevrolet
83	Brian Vickers	Red Bull Racing Team	Toyota
87	Joe Nemechek	NEMCO Motorsports	Toyota
88	Dale Earnhardt Jr.	Hendrick Motorsports	Chevrolet
99	Carl Edwards	Roush Fenway Racing	Ford

*Driver changed to Michael McDowell.

=== Practice and qualifying ===
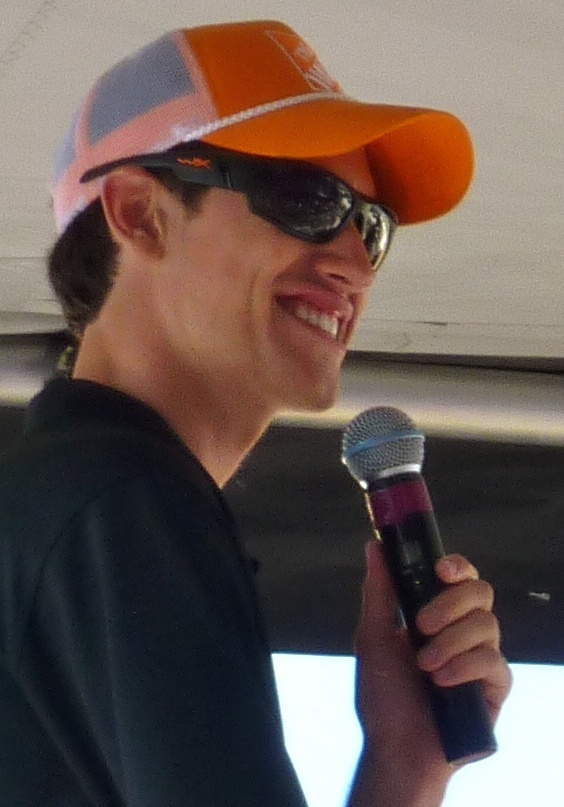
Joey Logano became the youngest pole sitter in a Cup Series road course race.

Three practice sessions were held before the Sunday race—one on Friday, and two on Saturday. The first session lasted 90 minutes. The Saturday afternoon session lasted 45 minutes, and the evening session lasted 75 minutes. In the first practice session, Kurt Busch was the quickest, leading Denny Hamlin, Kasey Kahne, Kevin Harvick, and Martin Truex Jr., who were in second, third, fourth, and fifth, respectively. During qualifying, forty-four cars were entered, but only forty-three were able to race because of NASCAR's qualifying procedure. Joey Logano clinched his second career pole position, with a time of 1:16.82. He was joined on the front row of the grid by Jamie McMurray. Paul Menard qualified third, Hamlin took fourth, and Ryan Newman started fifth. The driver that failed to qualify was Tony Ave.

In the second practice session, McMurray was the fastest with a fastest lap time of 1:17.62, less than two-tenths of a second quicker than second-placed Kurt Busch. Clint Bowyer took third place, ahead of fourth-placed Kyle Busch and A. J. Allmendinger. The Saturday evening session was held around the same time of day the race would start. Brad Keselowski was the quickest, posting a time of 1:18.10, narrowly faster than both McMurray in second and Kurt Busch in third. Juan Pablo Montoya and Bowyer, rounded out the top five positions.

== Results ==
=== Qualifying ===
Grid	No.	Driver	Team	Manufacturer	Speed	Time
1	20	Joey Logano	Joe Gibbs Racing	Toyota	93.256	1:16.82
2	1	Jamie McMurray	Earnhardt Ganassi Racing	Chevrolet	93.223	1:16.85
3	27	Paul Menard	Richard Childress Racing	Chevrolet	93.176	1:16.89
4	11	Denny Hamlin	Joe Gibbs Racing	Toyota	93.081	1:16.96
5	39	Ryan Newman	Stewart Haas Racing	Chevrolet	93.062	1:16.98
6	4	Kasey Kahne	Red Bull Racing Team	Toyota	92.936	1:17.09
7	43	A. J. Allmendinger	Richard Petty Motorsports	Ford	92.935	1:17.09
8	9	Marcos Ambrose	Richard Petty Motorsports	Ford	92.918	1:17.10
9	33	Clint Bowyer	Richard Childress Racing	Chevrolet	92.830	1:17.17
10	83	Brian Vickers	Red Bull Racing Team	Toyota	92.720	1:17.27
11	22	Kurt Busch	Penske Racing	Dodge	92.616	1:17.35
12	48	Jimmie Johnson	Hendrick Motorsports	Chevrolet	92.561	1:17.40
13	24	Jeff Gordon	Hendrick Motorsports	Chevrolet	92.553	1:17.40
14	56	Martin Truex Jr.	Michael Waltrip Racing	Toyota	92.545	1:17.41
15	2	Brad Keselowski	Penske Racing	Dodge	92.447	1:17.49
16	5	Mark Martin	Hendrick Motorsports	Chevrolet	92.439	1:17.50
17	42	Juan Pablo Montoya	Earnhardt Ganassi Racing	Chevrolet	92.411	1:17.52
18	88	Dale Earnhardt Jr.	Hendrick Motorsports	Chevrolet	92.372	1:17.56
19	18	Kyle Busch	Joe Gibbs Racing	Toyota	92.348	1:17.58
20	14	Tony Stewart	Stewart Haas Racing	Chevrolet	92.184	1:17.71
21	47	Bobby Labonte	JTG Daugherty Racing	Toyota	92.157	1:17.74
22	16	Greg Biffle	Roush Fenway Racing	Ford	92.096	1:17.79
23	99	Carl Edwards	Roush Fenway Racing	Ford	92.076	1:17.81
24	78	Regan Smith	Furniture Row Racing	Chevrolet	92.022	1:17.85
25	31	Jeff Burton	Richard Childress Racing	Chevrolet	91.987	1:17.88
26	29	Kevin Harvick	Richard Childress Racing	Chevrolet	91.818	1:18.02
27	13	Casey Mears	Germain Racing	Toyota	91.764	1:18.07
28	7	Robby Gordon	Robby Gordon Motorsports	Dodge	91.751	1:18.08
29	34	David Gilliland	Front Row Motorsports	Ford	91.689	1:18.13
30	51	Boris Said	Phoenix Racing	Chevrolet	91.603	1:18.21
31	87	Joe Nemechek	NEMCO Motorsports	Toyota	91.406	1:18.38
32	00	David Reutimann	Michael Waltrip Racing	Toyota	91.388	1:18.39
33	17	Matt Kenseth	Roush Fenway Racing	Ford	91.315	1:18.45
34	6	David Ragan	Roush Fenway Racing	Ford	91.255	1:18.51
35	77	P. J. Jones	Robby Gordon Motorsports	Dodge	91.223	1:18.53
36	36	Dave Blaney	Tommy Baldwin Racing	Chevrolet	91.214	1:18.54
37	60	Mike Skinner	Germain Racing	Toyota	90.781	1:18.92
38	66	David Mayhew	HP Racing	Toyota	90.561	1:19.11
39	32	Terry Labonte	FAS Lane Racing	Ford	90.504	1:19.16
40	81	Brian Simo	Whitney Motorsports	Chevrolet	90.346	1:19.30
41	71	Andy Lally	TRG Motorsports	Ford	90.303	1:19.33
42	37	Chris Cook	Front Row Motorsports	Ford	90.285	1:19.35
43	46	Andy Pilgrim	Whitney Motorsports	Chevrolet	89.885	1:19.70
Failed to Qualify
44	38	Tony Ave	Front Row Motorsports	Ford	89.717	1:19.85

=== Race results ===
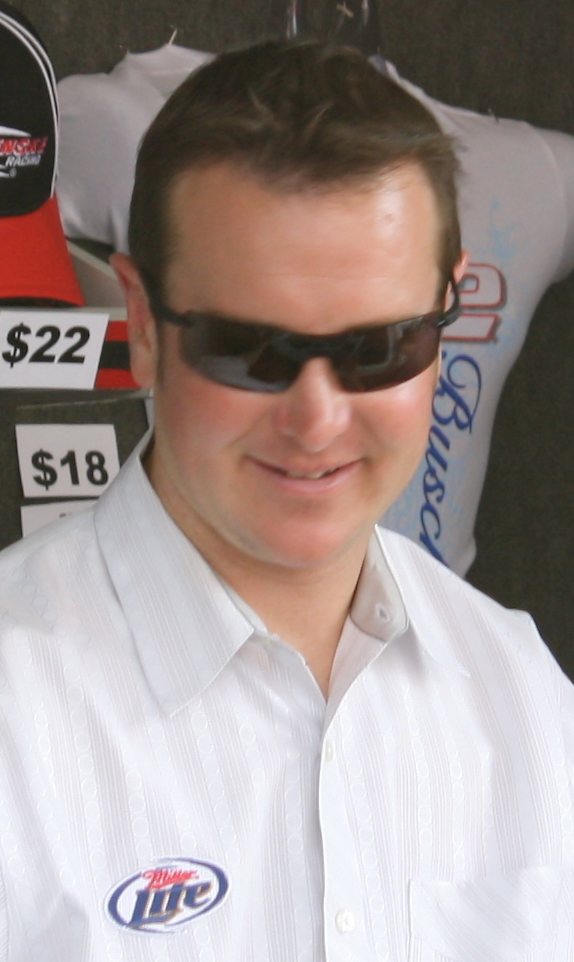
Kurt Busch won the race.

Pos	Grid	No.	Driver	Team	Manufacturer	Laps	Points
1	11	22	Kurt Busch	Penske Racing	Dodge	110	48
2	13	24	Jeff Gordon	Hendrick Motorsports	Chevrolet	110	42
3	23	99	Carl Edwards	Roush Fenway Racing	Ford	110	41
4	9	33	Clint Bowyer	Richard Childress Racing	Chevrolet	110	41
5	8	9	Marcos Ambrose	Richard Petty Motorsports	Ford	110	39
6	1	20	Joey Logano	Joe Gibbs Racing	Toyota	110	39
7	12	48	Jimmie Johnson	Hendrick Motorsports	Chevrolet	110	37
8	14	56	Martin Truex Jr.	Michael Waltrip Racing	Toyota	110	36
9	26	29	Kevin Harvick	Richard Childress Racing	Chevrolet	110	36
10	15	2	Brad Keselowski	Penske Racing	Dodge	110	34
11	19	18	Kyle Busch	Joe Gibbs Racing	Toyota	110	33
12	29	34	David Gilliland	Front Row Motorsports	Ford	110	33
13	7	43	A. J. Allmendinger	Richard Petty Motorsports	Ford	110	31
14	33	17	Matt Kenseth	Roush Fenway Racing	Ford	110	30
15	2	1	Jamie McMurray	Earnhardt Ganassi Racing	Chevrolet	110	29
16	24	78	Regan Smith	Furniture Row Racing	Chevrolet	110	29
17	3	27	Paul Menard	Richard Childress Racing	Chevrolet	110	27
18	28	7	Robby Gordon	Robby Gordon Motorsports	Dodge	110	26
19	16	5	Mark Martin	Hendrick Motorsports	Chevrolet	110	25
20	6	4	Kasey Kahne	Red Bull Racing Team	Toyota	110	24
21	25	31	Jeff Burton	Richard Childress Racing	Chevrolet	110	23
22	17	42	Juan Pablo Montoya	Earnhardt Ganassi Racing	Chevrolet	110	23
23	22	16	Greg Biffle	Roush Fenway Racing	Ford	110	21
24	32	00	David Reutimann	Michael Waltrip Racing	Toyota	110	20
25	5	39	Ryan Newman	Stewart Haas Racing	Chevrolet	110	19
26	43	46	Andy Pilgrim	Whitney Motorsports	Chevrolet	110	18
27	42	37	Chris Cook	Front Row Motorsports	Ford	110	17
28	30	51	Boris Said	Phoenix Racing	Chevrolet	110	16
29	34	6	David Ragan	Roush Fenway Racing	Ford	110	15
30	38	66	Michael McDowell	HP Racing	Toyota	110	14
31	36	36	Dave Blaney	Tommy Baldwin Racing	Chevrolet	110	13
32	39	32	Terry Labonte	FAS Lane Racing	Ford	110	12
33	40	81	Brian Simo	Whitney Motorsports	Chevrolet	109	11
34	27	13	Casey Mears	Germain Racing	Toyota	108	10
35	41	71	Andy Lally	TRG Motorsports	Ford	104	9
36	10	83	Brian Vickers	Red Bull Racing Team	Toyota	103	8
37	4	11	Denny Hamlin	Joe Gibbs Racing	Toyota	99	8
38	21	47	Bobby Labonte	JTG Daugherty Racing	Toyota	91	6
39	20	14	Tony Stewart	Stewart Haas Racing	Chevrolet	88	6
40	31	87	Joe Nemechek	NEMCO Motorsports	Toyota	66	0
41	18	88	Dale Earnhardt Jr.	Hendrick Motorsports	Chevrolet	45	3
42	37	60	Mike Skinner	Germain Racing	Toyota	10	0
43	35	77	P. J. Jones	Robby Gordon Motorsports	Dodge	5	1

== Standings after the race ==
Drivers' Championship standings

Pos	Driver	Points
1	Carl Edwards	573
2	Kevin Harvick	548
3	Jimmie Johnson	540
4	Kurt Busch	539
5	Kyle Busch	536

Manufacturers' Championship standings

Pos	Manufacturer	Points
1	Chevrolet	108
2	Ford	93
3	Toyota	84
4	Dodge	67

- Note: Only the top five positions are included for the driver standings.

Previous race: 2011 Heluva Good! Sour Cream Dips 400	Sprint Cup Series; 2011 season	Next race: 2011 Coke Zero 400
