= 2012 Quicken Loans 400 =

15th race of 2012 NASCAR Sprint Cup series

Race details
- Race 15 of 36 in the 2012 NASCAR Sprint Cup Series
- 2012 Quicken Loans 400 program cover
- Date: June 17, 2012
- Location: Michigan International Speedway, Brooklyn, Michigan
- Course: Permanent racing facility
- Course length: 2.000 miles (3.219 km)
- Distance: 200 laps, 400.000 mi (643.738 km)
- Weather: Isolated thunderstorms with a high around 89; wind out of the SSW at 9 mph
- Average speed: 139.144 mph (223.931 km/h)
- Attendance: 82,000

Pole position
Driver	Marcos Ambrose	Richard Petty Motorsports
- Time: 35.426

Most laps led
Driver	Dale Earnhardt Jr.	Hendrick Motorsports
- Laps: 95

Winner
No. 88	Dale Earnhardt Jr.	Hendrick Motorsports

Television in the United States
- Network: TNT
- Announcers: Adam Alexander, Kyle Petty, Wally Dallenbach Jr.
- Nielsen ratings: 3.2/7 (Final); 3.1/7 (Overnight); (5.284 million)

The 2012 Quicken Loans 400 was the 15th stock car race of the 2012 NASCAR Sprint Cup Series. It was held on June 17, 2012, in Brooklyn, Michigan, at Michigan International Speedway, before a crowd of 82,000 people. The track is a superspeedway that holds NASCAR races. Hendrick Motorsports driver Dale Earnhardt Jr. won the 200-lap race starting from 17th place. Tony Stewart of the Stewart–Haas Racing team finished in second, and Roush Fenway Racing's Matt Kenseth was third.

Marcos Ambrose won his first career pole position by posting a new track record speed in qualifying. He led the first five laps until Greg Biffle passed him on the sixth lap. He led the next twenty laps before Ambrose retook it for another five laps afterward. Biffle retook the lead on lap 54, holding it until Ambrose re-passed him to return to the front of the field fifteen laps later. Earnhardt took the lead for the first time on the 70th lap, and he kept the position for a total of 95 laps, more than any other driver. At the race's final restart on 141, Earnhardt led through the final round of green flag pit stops to win the race. There were a total of eight cautions and 23 lead changes among 14 drivers during the event.

The victory was Earnhardt's first in 143 races, his second at Michigan International Speedway, and the 19th of his career. The result moved him to within four points of Drivers' Championship leader Kenseth. Biffle maintained third place, and Jimmie Johnson moved past Denny Hamlin in fourth place. Chevrolet maintained its lead in the Manufacturers' Championship with 105 points, 18 points ahead of Toyota, 28 points in front of Ford, and 44 points ahead of Dodge with 21 races left in the season. The race attracted 5,284,000 television viewers.

== Background ==
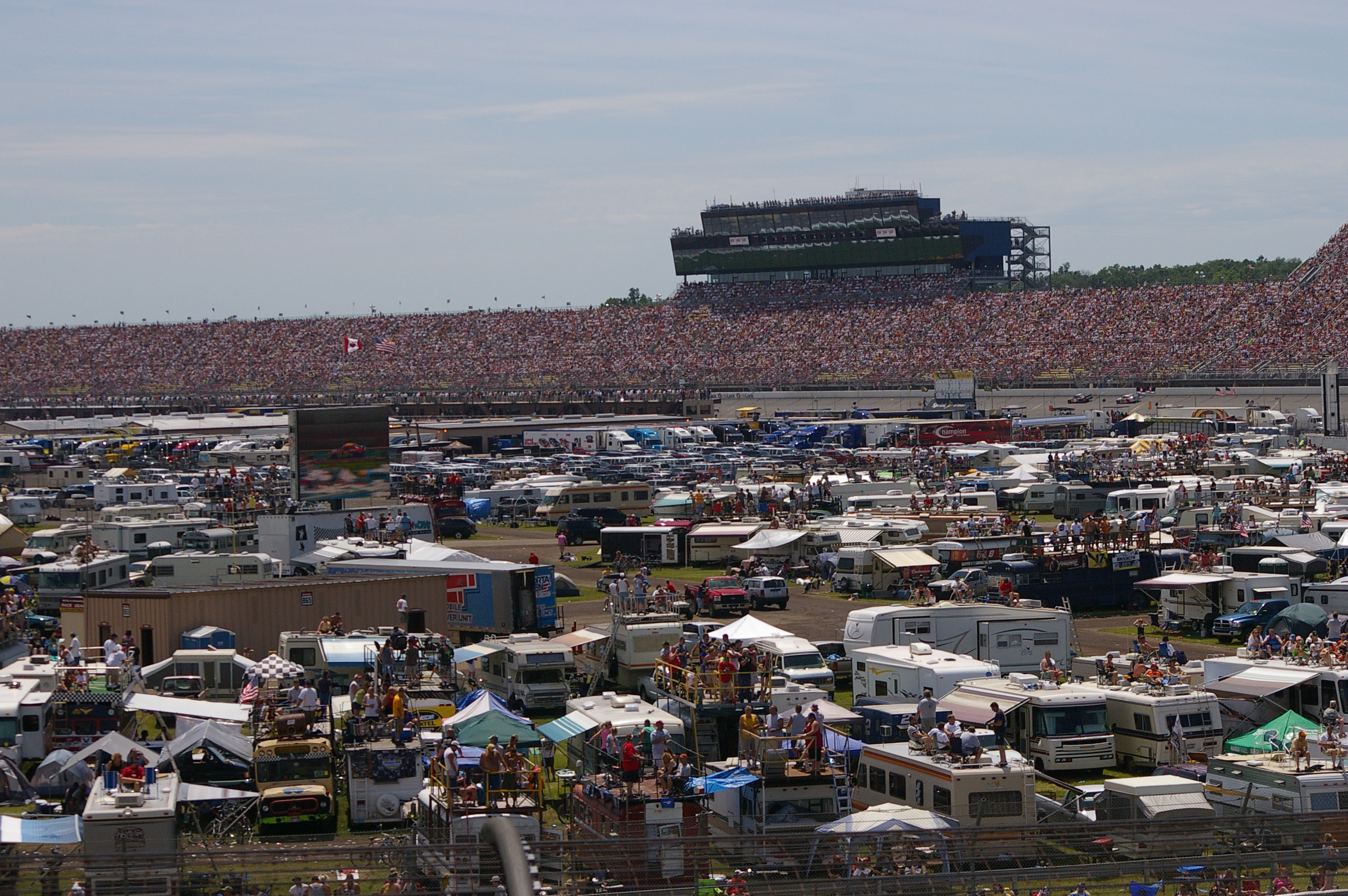
Michigan International Speedway, where the race was held.

The 2012 Quicken Loans 400 was the 15th of 36 scheduled stock car races of the 2012 NASCAR Sprint Cup Series. It ran for 200 laps over a distance of 400 mi (640 km), and was held on June 17, 2012, in Brooklyn, Michigan, at Michigan International Speedway, a superspeedway that holds NASCAR races. The standard track at Michigan International Speedway is a four-turn 2 mi (3.2 km) superspeedway. The track's turns are banked at eighteen degrees, while the front stretch (the location of the finish line) is banked at twelve degrees. The back stretch, has a five degree banking.

In preparation for the race, NASCAR held two test sessions on June 12, 2012, for teams to test the newer pavement at Michigan, the first since 1995. During the first test session (which was held in the morning and lasted for four hours) Mark Martin was quickest ahead of Kevin Harvick with a speed of 201.089 miles per hour (323.621 km/h) and a time of 35.805 seconds, while Tony Stewart was fastest in the second and final test session with a time of 35.662 seconds and recorded a speed of 201.896 miles per hour (324.920 km/h). Top speeds approached 218 miles per hour (351 km/h) during the day; NASCAR determined that the installation of restrictor plates would not be required, and NASCAR vice-president of competition Robin Pemberton spoke of his expectation that speeds would reduce as the surface rubbered in and track temperatures increased.

Before the race, Matt Kenseth led the Drivers' Championship with 523 points, and Dale Earnhardt Jr. stood in second with 513 points. Greg Biffle was in third place on 507 points, three points ahead of Denny Hamlin in fourth and fourteen points in front of Jimmie Johnson in fifth. Harvick, with 470 points, was five points in front of Martin Truex Jr., as Stewart with 448 points, was five points in front of Clint Bowyer in ninth and eight points in front of the tenth-placed Brad Keselowski. Carl Edwards and Kyle Busch rounded out the top twelve drivers. In the Manufacturers' Championship, Chevrolet was leading with 96 points, thirteen points ahead of Toyota in the second position. Ford, with 71 points, was also thirteen points ahead of Dodge in the battle for third place. Hamlin was the race's defending champion.

There were two driver changes heading into the race. After he was suspended from the preceding Pocono 400 for verbally abusing The Sporting News reporter Bob Pockrass at the Nationwide Series round at Dover International Speedway, Kurt Busch was reinstated to the No. 51 Phoenix Racing car after David Reutimann drove in his place. Team owner James Finch spoke to Busch during the week, and confirmed that the driver would remain with the team until the end of the year. Tommy Baldwin Racing announced that driver Tony Raines would compete in its No. 10 car in place of Reutimann as part of the team's plan for the upcoming races.

== Practice and qualifying ==
Three practice sessions were held before the Sunday race. The first and second sessions that took place on Friday ran for 80 minutes, and the third additional practice session held on Saturday lasted 75 minutes. In the first practice session, Martin was fastest with a lap of 35.754 seconds, almost six hundredths of a second faster than Earnhardt in second. Trevor Bayne, Stewart, Kenseth, Juan Pablo Montoya, Jeff Gordon, Kasey Kahne, Paul Menard, and Truex followed in positions three to ten. Biffle paced the second practice session with a 35.172 seconds lap. He was six hundredths of a second faster than Marcos Ambrose in the second position. Harvick, Edwards, Menard, Bayne, Johnson, Joey Logano, Kurt Busch, and Kenseth completed the top ten ahead of the qualifying session. The only incident in the Friday practice sessions was Jamie McMurray scraping the right-hand quarter of his vehicle when he made contact with the outside barrier.

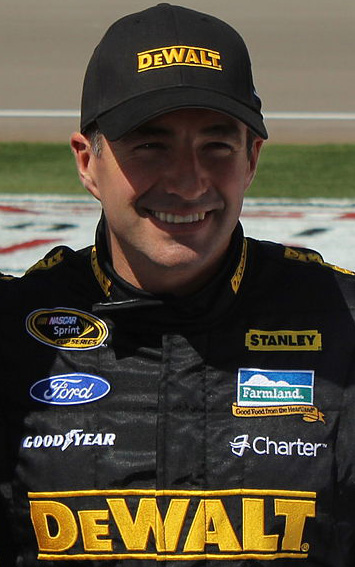
Marcos Ambrose had the first pole position of his career with a new track speed record of Michigan International Speedway.

Early average practice speeds approached 200 mph (320 km/h), breaking the official qualifying stock car speed record of 194.232 mph (312.586 km/h). Blisters appeared on several front-side tires used by an estimated one-quarter of teams during the session, and that caused drivers to raise concerns about the speed they were driving at on the warm track surface and the hot weather temperatures that were experienced in the opening two practice sessions. Harvick suggested that all the drivers slow to manage the wear of their tires when the track surface rubbered in, while Edwards and Hamlin reported no issues with their tires; the former said he would discuss the situation with his crew chief Bob Osborne. NASCAR's control tire supplier Goodyear advised all teams to scuff their tires, and run them through a heat cycle. The tires run in practice were later utilized in the Saturday morning qualifying session.

Forty-five drivers were entered in the qualifier on Saturday afternoon, according to NASCAR's qualifying procedure, 43 were allowed to race. Each driver was limited to two timed laps, with the starting order determined by the competitor's fastest times. Recording a track speed record of 203.241 mph (327.085 km/h) that broke's Ryan Newman's achievement in June 2005, (Note: The track speed record is currently held by Jeff Gordon at 206.558 mph (332.423 km/h) in qualifying for the 2014 Pure Michigan 400.) Ambrose clinched the first pole position of his career with a time of 35.426 seconds. He was the fourth driver to complete a qualifying lap that was faster than 200 mph (320 km/h), and it was the fastest speed set in any qualifier since Bill Elliott's 1987 Talladega Superspeedway lap. He was joined on the grid's front row by Harvick who was 0.211 seconds slower, and held the pole until Ambrose's lap. Biffle qualified third, Kahne took fourth, and Newman started fifth. Kenseth, Bayne, Stewart, Logano, and Johnson rounded out the top ten qualifiers. Edwards' engine developed a possible fuel related issue on his warm-up lap, and he did not set a timed effort. The two drivers who failed to qualify were David Stremme and Stacy Compton. After qualifying, Ambrose said, "It is a good bragging right, I'll give it that, I'm just really excited to get the speed, and to claim to be the fastest guy out there is just awesome. We've missed some poles — this is my first pole in Sprint Cup. We've missed some by thousandths of a second and conditions changing, so it's good that we actually got one to stick, and one that's got so many records attached to it."

After qualifying, Goodyear changed the left-hand side tire combination to a more durable and harder compound after consulting teams and analysing data, but retained the original right-hand side compound. They transported 1,200 tires from a warehouse in North Carolina to ensure each team met NASCAR's requirement of using 10 sets of tires for the event, and they arrived in Michigan on Saturday afternoon. (Note: The tires were previously used for the 2006 and 2007 races at Charlotte Motor Speedway.) An extra 75 minute practice session was scheduled following the track's Nationwide Series race. Biffle was quickest with a lap of 36.801 seconds, followed by Johnson, Edwards, Kahne, McMurray, Kurt Busch, A. J. Allmendinger, Truex, Martin, and Harvick. Top speeds approached no higher than 195.647 mph (314.863 km/h), but the new left-hand side tires received a mixed reception from drivers. Newman felt that NASCAR made the correct decision, and Edwards predicted that the while the cars were looser, it would improve the quality of racing. Earnhardt, however, commented that he could not complete extra laps due to a handling difficulty, and Ambrose noted a lower amount of grip and increased vehicular imbalance provided by the tires.

=== Qualifying results ===
Grid	No.	Driver	Team	Manufacturer	Time	Speed
1	9	Marcos Ambrose	Richard Petty Motorsports	Ford	35.426	203.241
2	29	Kevin Harvick	Richard Childress Racing	Chevrolet	35.637	202.037
3	16	Greg Biffle	Roush Fenway Racing	Ford	35.676	201.816
4	5	Kasey Kahne	Hendrick Motorsports	Chevrolet	35.693	201.720
5	39	Ryan Newman	Stewart–Haas Racing	Chevrolet	35.737	201.472^{1}
6	17	Matt Kenseth	Roush Fenway Racing	Ford	35.739	201.461
7	21	Trevor Bayne	Wood Brothers Racing	Ford	35.742	201.444
8	14	Tony Stewart	Stewart–Haas Racing	Chevrolet	35.755	201.370
9	20	Joey Logano	Joe Gibbs Racing	Toyota	35.777	201.247
10	48	Jimmie Johnson	Hendrick Motorsports	Chevrolet	35.789	201.179^{1}
11	11	Denny Hamlin	Joe Gibbs Racing	Toyota	35.842	200.882
12	78	Regan Smith	Furniture Row Racing	Chevrolet	35.870	200.725
13	15	Clint Bowyer	Michael Waltrip Racing	Toyota	35.877	200.686
14	55	Mark Martin	Michael Waltrip Racing	Toyota	35.894	200.591
15	43	Aric Almirola	Richard Petty Motorsports	Ford	35.930	200.390
16	56	Martin Truex Jr.	Michael Waltrip Racing	Toyota	35.931	200.384
17	88	Dale Earnhardt Jr.	Hendrick Motorsports	Chevrolet	35.943	200.317
18	27	Paul Menard	Richard Childress Racing	Chevrolet	35.976	200.133
19	1	Jamie McMurray	Earnhardt Ganassi Racing	Chevrolet	35.980	200.111
20	22	A. J. Allmendinger	Penske Racing	Dodge	36.010	199.945
21	42	Juan Pablo Montoya	Earnhardt Ganassi Racing	Chevrolet	36.070	199.612
22	33	Austin Dillon	Richard Childress Racing	Chevrolet	36.083	199.540
23	23	Scott Riggs	R3 Motorsports	Chevrolet	36.095	199.474
24	13	Casey Mears	Germain Racing	Ford	36.262	198.555
25	2	Brad Keselowski	Penske Racing	Dodge	36.277	198.473
26	51	Kurt Busch	Phoenix Racing	Chevrolet	36.320	198.238
27	98	Michael McDowell	Phil Parsons Racing	Ford	36.342	198.118
28	24	Jeff Gordon	Hendrick Motorsports	Chevrolet	36.378	197.922
29	19	Mike Bliss	Humphrey Smith Racing	Toyota	36.404	197.781
30	26	Josh Wise	Front Row Motorsports	Ford	36.419	197.699
31	47	Bobby Labonte	JTG Daugherty Racing	Toyota	36.475	197.395
32	83	Landon Cassill	BK Racing	Toyota	36.532	197.087
33	31	Jeff Burton	Richard Childress Racing	Chevrolet	36.538	197.055
34	18	Kyle Busch	Joe Gibbs Racing	Toyota	36.543	197.028
35	38	David Gilliland	Front Row Motorsports	Ford	36.580	196.829
36	36	Dave Blaney	Tommy Baldwin Racing	Chevrolet	35.582	196.818
37	87	Joe Nemechek	NEMCO Motorsports	Toyota	36.591	196.770
38	34	David Ragan	Front Row Motorsports	Ford	36.609	196.673
39	93	Travis Kvapil	BK Racing	Toyota	37.285	193.107
40	32	Ken Schrader	FAS Lane Racing	Ford	37.768	190.638^{2}
41	10	Tony Raines	Tommy Baldwin Racing	Chevrolet	38.254	188.216^{2}
42	99	Carl Edwards	Roush Fenway Racing	Ford	—	—^{2}
43	49	J. J. Yeley	Robinson-Blakeney Racing	Toyota	36.901	195.119
Failed to qualify
44	30	David Stremme	Inception Motorsports	Toyota	37.057	194.295
45	74	Stacy Compton	Turn One Racing	Chevrolet	37.189	193.606
^{1} Moved to the back of the grid for changing engines (#39, #48)^{2} Set by owner points

== Race ==
Live television coverage of the race began at 12:01 p.m. Eastern Daylight Time (UTC−05:00) in the United States on TNT. Commentary was provided by Adam Alexander, Wally Dallenbach Jr. and Kyle Petty. Around the start of the race, weather conditions were partly cloudy with the air temperature at 68 °F (20 °C); the air temperature was expected to reach a high of 83 °F (28 °C), and scattered showers were forecast to fall on the track. The start was delayed at 1:18 local time because jet driers were instructed to remove standing water. It began to drizzle 73 minutes later, and jet driers again circulated the track. Doug Bradshaw, pastor of Williamston Free Methodist Church, began pre-race ceremonies with an invocation. Members of the United States Army Band performed the national anthem, and Detroit Red Wings ice hockey starting goaltender Jimmy Howard and his son James commanded the drivers to start their engines. During the pace laps, Johnson and Newman moved to the rear of the field because they had changed their engines.

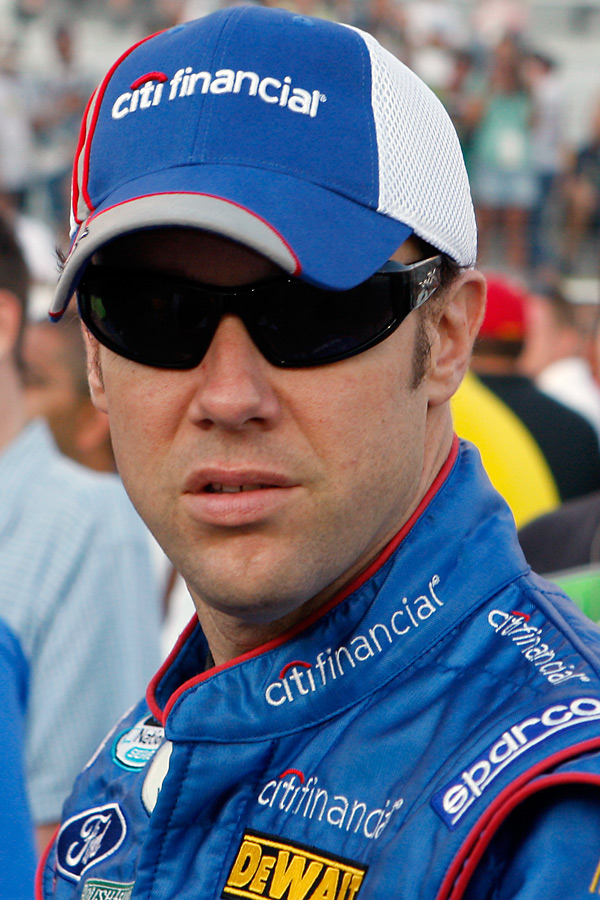
Matt Kenseth (pictured in 2009) led after passing Ambrose early in the race and eventually finished third after leading 17 laps.

The race commenced at 3:05 p.m. local time. Ambrose broke free from the pack to lead on the approach to the first turn. The first caution came on the following lap when Kurt Busch spun on the backstretch. Ambrose maintained the lead at the lap five restart and held off a challenge from Biffle. On lap six, Biffle tried again, and was successful next time round, getting ahead of Ambrose to take over the lead. Josh Wise's engine failed on lap ten, necessitating the second caution as oil was laid on the track. During the caution, Earnhardt and Biffle made pit stops. The race restarted six laps later, with Biffle keeping his lead over Ambrose. After starting ninth, Logano had moved into the third position by the 21st lap. On the next lap, Kenseth passed Logano to move into third place. A competition caution was waved on lap 26 to mandate that teams made pit stops because of the new left-hand side tires, and the track's newer pavement. Ambrose led the field at the restart on the 31st lap. Kenseth overtook Ambrose to claim the lead on the next lap.

After starting 34th, Kyle Busch was running in seventh by lap 34. As Kenseth increased his lead over Ambrose, Martin overtook Logano for third place on the 39th lap. Four laps later, Logano lost the fourth position to Biffle. That same lap, Keselowski got ahead of Almirola for tenth. Upfront, Ambrose closed the gap to Kenseth, and he overtook him for the lead on lap 49 despite the presence of Ken Schrader's slower car. A second competition caution for drivers to make mandatory pit stops came out on lap 51. The caution was withdrawn five laps later, and Biffle led the field at the restart, followed by Ambrose and Martin. On lap 60, Ambrose attempted to challenge Biffle for the first position but he could not pass him. Keselowski moved into fifth four laps later. On the 69th lap, Ambrose passed Biffle for the lead, and Earnhardt got ahead of Biffle soon after. On the next lap, Earnhardt overtook Ambrose to become the new leader. While Earnhardt increased his advantage at the front of the pack, Martin got by Biffle to advance into third by the 79th lap.

In the meantime, drivers elected to make green flag pit stops between the 78th to 81st laps. On lap 82, the fifth caution was prompted when foam from a SAFER barrier beside the circuit had to be cleared by series officials. Drivers continued to make pit stops under caution conditions. At the lap 87 restart, Earnhardt was passed by Stewart on the entry to the first turn for the first position. Newman and Logano got ahead of Ambrose to move into sixth and seventh places on lap 90. Ambrose lost a further four positions to Martin, Keselowski, Menard, and Montoya during lap 91. By the following lap, Gordon was in fourth place. Later, Stewart increased his lead over Earnhardt to seven-tenths of a second by lap 97. However, eight laps later, Earnhardt closed the gap to Stewart and passed him to get back the lead. Green flag pit stops were made from laps 115 and 120, before a sixth caution came out for Kurt Busch who spun for a second time in the second turn on the 121st lap. Gordon led at the lap 126 restart, but his teammate Earnhardt passed him around the outside in turn two soon after.

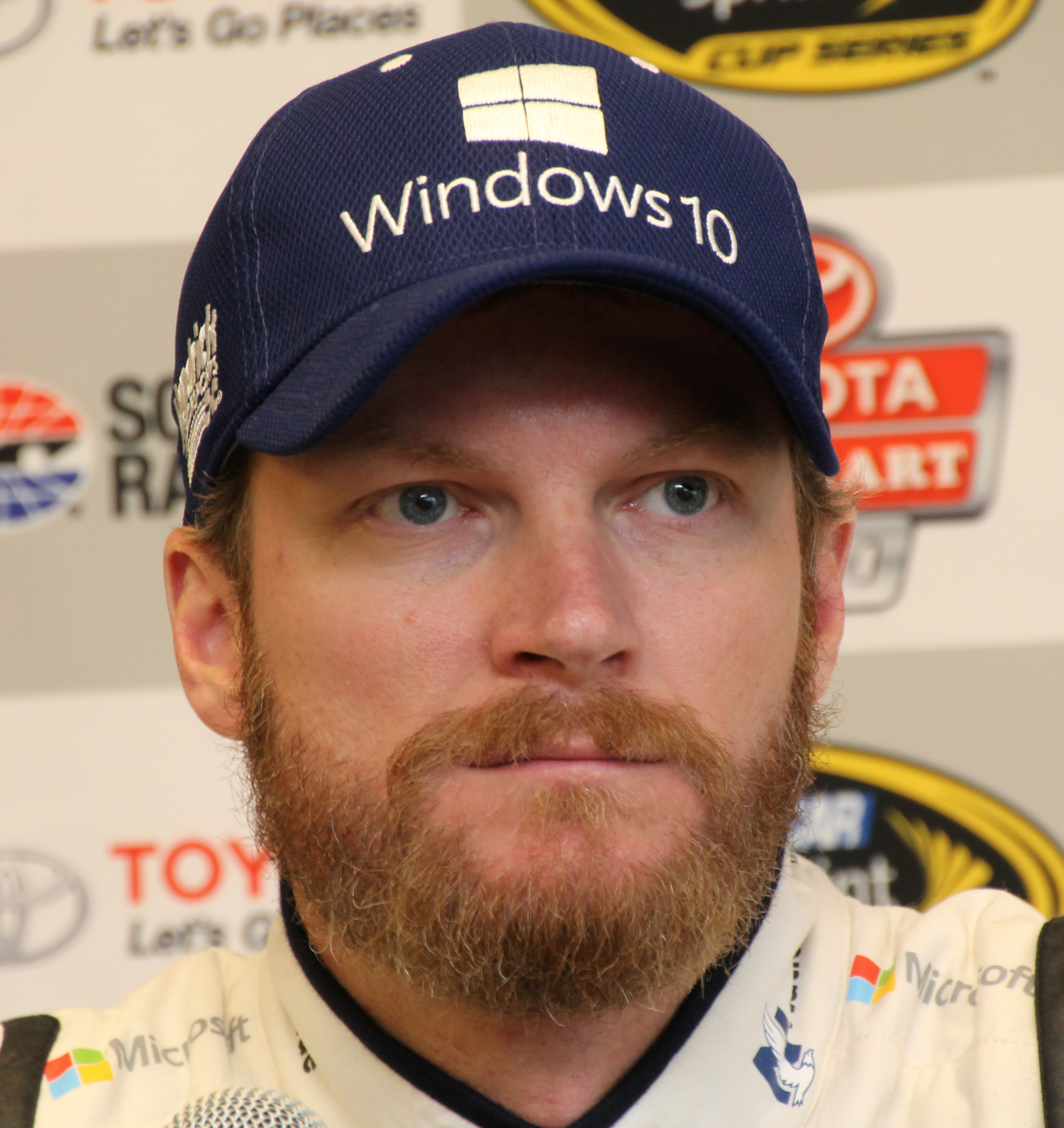
Dale Earnhardt Jr. (pictured in 2015) led a race-high 95 laps to end a 143-race winless streak and claim the 19th victory of his career.

On the lap, a seventh caution was prompted for a three-car accident, that began when Logano attempted to avoid hitting Gilliland (who made contact with the barrier), and lost control of his car. Logano turned back into the wall, collecting Gilliland and Kahne. Logano was transported out of the track via an ambulance as a precaution. The race restarted on the 133rd lap, with Earnhardt holding the lead over Gordon and Montoya through the first and second turns. Soon after, the eighth caution was waved; Hamlin and Newman made contact, sending Hamlin spinning on the exit to turn four, and into the grass. As Hamlin went down pit road with oil trailing from his car, its right-hand side caught fire, and he stopped in his pit box. Hamlin received assistance to exit his car by Newman's and Kyle Busch's pit crews, as safety officials extinguished the fire. Hamlin was unhurt. Earnhardt continued to maintain the lead through turn one at the lap 141 restart. Behind Earnhardt, Stewart kept second place from Gordon. Five laps later, Biffle passed Bowyer for fourth, and Ambrose was overtaken by Martin for tenth.

Johnson got past Montoya on the 147th lap. Twelve laps later, Bowyer was passed by Kenseth. Biffle overtook Gordon to move into third on lap 160. The final round of green flag pit stops began on lap 163, as Earnhardt made his stop. Biffle, Bowyer, McMurray, and Keselowski each led the pack over the next seven laps, until Earnhardt regained the lead after all pit stops had been completed. On lap 186, Biffle lost third place to Johnson. Six laps later, Johnson lost third to Kenseth, and fell to fifth as Biffle got ahead of him. In the meantime, Earnhardt opened his lead at the front of the field to more than five seconds, and he held it for the remainder of the race to win. It was his first victory in 143 races, his second at Michigan International Speedway, and the 19th of his career. Stewart finished second, having felt uncomfortable to challenge Earnhardt with his set of tires. Kenseth was third, Biffle took fourth, and Johnson fifth. Gordon, Bowyer, Montoya, Ambrose, and Harvick rounded out the top ten finishers. There were 23 lead changes among 14 different drivers during the race. Earnhardt's 95 laps led was the most of any competitor.

=== Post-race ===
"As soon as I got out of the car, my initial thoughts was about how many people were in their living rooms screaming at the top of their lungs, running out in their yard. I just wish I could see it all at once. That was the one thing I kept thinking about."

— Earnhardt taking about his mindset in Victory Lane after the race.

Earnhardt appeared in Victory Lane to celebrate his first win since the 2008 LifeLock 400 in front of the crowd of 82,000 people; the win earned him $168,775. He dedicated the victory to his fanbase and thanked his team and pit crew for supporting him, "I was so nervous in the last few laps of that race four years ago. Today, this is the worst feeling, riding around there with 15 laps to go wondering what's going to happen or how you were going to lose. I was just thinking, man, those laps could not go by fast enough. It feels good to win, But in a day or two, I'll be thirsty for the next one." Stewart conceded that Earnhardt had a faster car than his but insisted that the latter's victory was not designated as "a national holiday" due to its popularity, "This morning they were celebrating his fourth anniversary of his last win, so I guess we're all in a state of mourning now, because he's broke that string now, so I don't know what we're all supposed to think." Third-placed Kenseth said of his race, "It was kind of a long day. We were pretty good in the beginning of the race and got shuffled back and it was tough to work traffic today. They got the setup good on the last two runs and had good pit stops and we were able to stand on the gas and work our way up there to third."

Earnhardt received congratulations via text messages from various people and celebrities through Twitter, including former driver Mario Andretti, multi-instrumentalist Charlie Daniels and country music singer Brad Paisley. He also received a phone call from South Carolina Gamecocks football coach Steve Spurrier. Steve Letarte, Earnhardt's crew chief, commented his belief that the driver and team's focus helped him to win, "I can't say enough about the group of guys we have here. They are a tremendous group. They deserve a tremendous amount of the credit. Dale deserves a tremendous amount of credit as well. He's not only a great driver, but he's a leader in the team. He does it in his own style and we love the style he brings. It was a fun day to finally get him to Victory Lane." Tori Petry of sports radio station WGGG opined the victory helped NASCAR receive better exposure, and Los Angeles Times writer Jim Peltz wrote he believed it would provide the series with an attendance and television ratings increase. Jeff Hammond of Speed said the victory was the result of Earnhardt's team having improved momentum and better focus. He wrote of his expectation for Earnhardt to perform well for the remainder of the season.

Hamlin's car bay fire on lap 133 was the first of his career. He said it was an experience that he hoped to avoid in the future but praised the modern safety standards of racing vehicles, "Thankfully, we've got everything that we have safety-wise. One good thing at least is that Ryan's guys came and got me out – and a couple of the 18 (Busch's) guys. NASCAR is a family, and any time anyone is in trouble, everyone is going to try to help. It's good that those guys were around and willing to take a chance." Logano commented that he believed he could have corrected his car in his three-car crash with Gilliland and Kahne, "It's a little frustrating, but we had a top-10 car today, I think we had a top 10 coming to us here – maybe a top five." Ambrose, who led early in the event and then lost positions, said he would accept a top ten finish and was proud of his team, "We led some laps and looked good up there. It was a strong day for us. Not quite what we wanted, but we will take it and move along to Sonoma."

The result kept Kenseth in the lead of the Drivers' Championship with 523 points, ahead of Earnhardt who lowered his advantage from ten to four points. Biffle maintained third place with 548 points. With 532 points, Johnson moved ahead of Hamlin (514 points) to assume the fourth position. Harvick, Truex, Stewart, Bowyer, Keselowski, Edwards and Kyle Busch rounded out the top twelve. In the Manufacturers' Championship, Chevrolet maintained the lead with 105 points. Toyota remained in second place with 87 points, ten points ahead of Ford, who in turn, were sixteen points in front of Dodge in fourth. The race had a television audience of 5,284,000 million viewers and a 3.2 US rating, a 10 percent ratings increase and 8 percent more viewership than the 2011 race; it took two hours, 52 minutes, and 29 seconds to complete, and the margin of victory was 5.393 seconds.

=== Race results ===
Pos.	No.	Driver	Team	Manufacturer	Laps	Points
1	88	Dale Earnhardt Jr.	Hendrick Motorsports	Chevrolet	200	48^{2}^{3}
2	14	Tony Stewart	Stewart–Haas Racing	Chevrolet	200	43^{1}
3	17	Matt Kenseth	Roush Fenway Racing	Ford	200	42^{1}
4	16	Greg Biffle	Roush Fenway Racing	Ford	200	41^{1}
5	48	Jimmie Johnson	Hendrick Motorsports	Chevrolet	200	39
6	24	Jeff Gordon	Hendrick Motorsports	Chevrolet	200	39^{1}
7	15	Clint Bowyer	Michael Waltrip Racing	Toyota	200	38^{1}
8	42	Juan Pablo Montoya	Earnhardt Ganassi Racing	Chevrolet	200	37^{1}
9	9	Marcos Ambrose	Richard Petty Motorsports	Ford	200	36^{1}
10	29	Kevin Harvick	Richard Childress Racing	Chevrolet	200	34
11	99	Carl Edwards	Roush Fenway Racing	Ford	200	33
12	56	Martin Truex Jr.	Michael Waltrip Racing	Toyota	200	32
13	2	Brad Keselowski	Penske Racing	Dodge	200	32^{1}
14	1	Jamie McMurray	Earnhardt Ganassi Racing	Chevrolet	200	31^{1}
15	39	Ryan Newman	Stewart–Haas Racing	Chevrolet	199	29
16	47	Bobby Labonte	JTG Daugherty Racing	Toyota	199	28
17	43	Aric Almirola	Richard Petty Motorsports	Ford	199	27
18	83	Landon Cassill	BK Racing	Toyota	199	26
19	22	A. J. Allmendinger	Penske Racing	Dodge	199	25
20	13	Casey Mears	Germain Racing	Ford	199	24
21	31	Jeff Burton	Richard Childress Racing	Chevrolet	199	24
22	27	Paul Menard	Richard Childress Racing	Chevrolet	199	22
23	34	David Ragan	Front Row Motorsports	Ford	199	21
24	33	Austin Dillon	Richard Childress Racing	Chevrolet	198	—^{4}
25	36	Dave Blaney	Tommy Baldwin Racing	Chevrolet	198	20^{1}
26	93	Travis Kvapil	BK Racing	Toyota	197	18
27	38	David Gilliland	Front Row Motorsports	Ford	197	18^{1}
28	78	Regan Smith	Furniture Row Racing	Chevrolet	197	16
29	55	Mark Martin	Michael Waltrip Racing	Toyota	195	15
30	51	Kurt Busch	Phoenix Racing	Chevrolet	194	14
31	32	Ken Schrader	FAS Lane Racing	Ford	193	13
32	18	Kyle Busch	Joe Gibbs Racing	Toyota	157	12
33	5	Kasey Kahne	Hendrick Motorsports	Chevrolet	151	11
34	11	Denny Hamlin	Joe Gibbs Racing	Toyota	132	10
35	20	Joey Logano	Joe Gibbs Racing	Toyota	125	9
36	10	Tony Raines	Tommy Baldwin Racing	Chevrolet	68	8
37	49	J. J. Yeley	Robinson-Blakeney Racing	Toyota	67	8^{1}
38	98	Michael McDowell	Phil Parsons Racing	Ford	41	6
39	19	Mike Bliss	Humphrey Smith Racing	Toyota	35	—^{4}
40	87	Joe Nemechek	NEMCO Motorsports	Toyota	32	—^{4}
41	23	Scott Riggs	R3 Motorsports	Chevrolet	27	3
42	26	Josh Wise	Front Row Motorsports	Ford	9	2
43	21	Trevor Bayne	Wood Brothers Racing	Ford	7	—^{4}
^{1} Includes one bonus point for leading a lap^{2} Includes two bonus points for leading the most laps^{3} Includes three bonus points for winning the race^{4} Ineligible for championship points

== Standings after the race ==
Drivers' Championship standings

Pos	+/–	Driver	Points
1		Matt Kenseth	565
2		Dale Earnhardt Jr.	561 (−4)
3		Greg Biffle	548 (−17)
4	1	Jimmie Johnson	532 (−33)
5	1	Denny Hamlin	514 (−51)
6		Kevin Harvick	504 (−61)
7		Martin Truex Jr.	497 (−68)
8		Tony Stewart	491 (−74)
9		Clint Bowyer	481 (−84)
10		Brad Keselowski	458 (−107)
11		Carl Edwards	456 (−109)
12		Kyle Busch	432 (−133)

Manufacturers' Championship standings

Pos	+/–	Manufacturer	Points
1		Chevrolet	105
2		Toyota	87 (−18)
3		Ford	77 (−28)
4		Dodge	61 (−44)

- Note: Only the top twelve positions are included for the driver standings.

== Notes and references ==
=== References ===
Previous race: 2012 Pocono 400	Sprint Cup Series; 2012 season	Next race: 2012 Toyota/Save Mart 350
