= 2011 Coke Zero 400 =

NASCAR race at Daytona in 2011

2011 Coke Zero 400 Powered by Coca-Cola
Race details
- Race 17 of 36 in the 2011 NASCAR Sprint Cup Series
- Date: July 2, 2011
- Official name: Coke Zero 400
- Location: Daytona International Speedway in Daytona Beach, Florida.
- Course: Permanent racing facility
- Course length: 2.5 miles (4 km)
- Distance: 170 laps, 425 mi (683.971 km)
- Weather: Temperatures between 69.8 °F (21.0 °C) and 78.2 °F (25.7 °C) were observed locally during race; only 1.28 inches (3.3 cm) of precipitation recorded within 24 hours of event

Pole position
Driver	Mark Martin	Hendrick Motorsports
- Time: 49.433

Most laps led
Driver	Ryan Newman	Stewart–Haas Racing
- Laps: 25

Winner
No. 6	David Ragan	Roush Fenway Racing

Television in the United States
- Network: Turner Network Television
- Announcers: Adam Alexander, Wally Dallenbach Jr. and Kyle Petty

The 2011 Coke Zero 400 Powered by Coca-Cola was a NASCAR Sprint Cup Series stock car race that was held on July 2, 2011, at Daytona International Speedway in Daytona Beach, Florida. Contested over 160 laps on the 2.5-mile (4.0 km) asphalt tri-oval, it was the 17th race of the 2011 Sprint Cup Series season. The race was won by David Ragan of Roush Fenway Racing, his first in the series. Ragan's teammate Matt Kenseth finished second and Joey Logano finished third.

== Entry list ==
No.	Driver	Team/Owner	Manufacturer
00	David Reutimann	Michael Waltrip Racing	Toyota
1	Jamie McMurray	Earnhardt Ganassi Racing	Chevrolet
2	Brad Keselowski	Penske Racing	Dodge
4	Kasey Kahne	Red Bull Racing Team	Toyota
5	Mark Martin	Hendrick Motorsports	Chevrolet
6	David Ragan	Roush Fenway Racing	Ford
7	Mike Bliss	Robby Gordon Motorsports	Dodge
9	Marcos Ambrose	Richard Petty Motorsports	Ford
11	Denny Hamlin	Joe Gibbs Racing	Toyota
13	Casey Mears	Germain Racing	Toyota
14	Tony Stewart	Stewart–Haas Racing	Chevrolet
16	Greg Biffle	Roush Fenway Racing	Ford
17	Matt Kenseth	Roush Fenway Racing	Ford
18	Kyle Busch	Joe Gibbs Racing	Toyota
20	Joey Logano	Joe Gibbs Racing	Toyota
21	Trevor Bayne (R)	Wood Brothers Racing	Ford
22	Kurt Busch	Penske Racing	Dodge
24	Jeff Gordon	Hendrick Motorsports	Chevrolet
27	Paul Menard	Richard Childress Racing	Chevrolet
29	Kevin Harvick	Richard Childress Racing	Chevrolet
31	Jeff Burton	Richard Childress Racing	Chevrolet
32	Terry Labonte	FAS Lane Racing	Ford
33	Clint Bowyer	Richard Childress Racing	Chevrolet
34	David Gilliland	Front Row Motorsports	Ford
35	Geoff Bodine	Tommy Baldwin Racing	Chevrolet
36	Dave Blaney	Tommy Baldwin Racing	Chevrolet
37	Tony Raines	Max Q Motorsports	Ford
38	Travis Kvapil	Front Row Motorsports	Ford
39	Ryan Newman	Stewart–Haas Racing	Chevrolet
42	Juan Pablo Montoya	Earnhardt Ganassi Racing	Chevrolet
43	A. J. Allmendinger	Richard Petty Motorsports	Ford
46	J. J. Yeley	Whitney Motorsports	Chevrolet
47	Bobby Labonte	JTG Daugherty Racing	Toyota
48	Jimmie Johnson	Hendrick Motorsports	Chevrolet
51	Landon Cassill	Phoenix Racing	Chevrolet
56	Martin Truex Jr.	Michael Waltrip Racing	Toyota
60	Mike Skinner	Germain Racing	Toyota
66	Michael McDowell	HP Racing	Toyota
71	Andy Lally (R)	TRG Motorsports	Ford
78	Regan Smith	Furniture Row Racing	Chevrolet
83	Brian Vickers	Red Bull Racing	Toyota
87	Joe Nemechek	NEMCO Motorsports	Toyota
88	Dale Earnhardt Jr.	Hendrick Motorsports	Chevrolet
97	Kevin Conway	NEMCO Motorsports	Toyota
99	Carl Edwards	Roush Fenway Racing	Ford

== Report ==
=== Background ===
Daytona International Speedway, where the race was held.

Daytona International Speedway was one of, at the time, six superspeedways to hold NASCAR races, the others being Michigan International Speedway, Auto Club Speedway, Indianapolis Motor Speedway, Pocono Raceway and Talladega Superspeedway. The standard track at Daytona International Speedway is a four-turn superspeedway that is 2.5 miles (4.0 km) long. The track's turns are banked at 31 degrees, while the front stretch, the location of the finish line, is banked at 18 degrees. Kevin Harvick was the defending race winner.

Prior to the race, Carl Edwards led the Drivers' Championship with 573 points, and Harvick stood in second with 548 points. Jimmie Johnson was third in the Drivers' Championship with 540 points in a Chevrolet, Kurt Busch was fourth with 539 points, and Kyle Busch was in fifth with 536 points. In the Manufacturers' Championship, Chevrolet was leading with 108 points, 15 points ahead of Ford. Toyota, with 84 points, was 17 ahead of Dodge in the battle for third.

=== Practice and qualifying ===
Two practice sessions were scheduled before the race on Thursday. The sessions were scheduled to be 80 and 85 minutes long. However, because of wet weather the first practice session was cancelled, and the following session was shortened to 45 minutes long. In the only practice session for the race, Marcos Ambrose was the quickest with a time of 45.133 seconds. A. J. Allmendinger followed in the second position, two hundredths of a second slower than Ambrose. Kurt Busch was scored third ahead of Brad Keselowski, and Mark Martin in fourth and fifth.

During qualifying, forty-five cars were entered, but only forty-three were able to race because of NASCAR's qualifying procedure. Martin clinched his 50th career pole position, with a time of 49.433. He was joined on the front row of the grid by 2011 Daytona 500 winner Trevor Bayne. Clint Bowyer qualified third, Jeff Gordon took fourth, and David Ragan started fifth. The two drivers that failed to qualify were Tony Raines and J. J. Yeley.

== Race ==
Pole sitter Mark Martin led the first lap of the race with his teammate Jeff Gordon pushing him. Outside pole sitter and reigning Daytona 500 champ Trevor Bayne attempted to take the lead on lap 2 with Clint Bowyer but failed to get in front of Martin and Gordon. Unfortunately for Bayne, his night would come to an early end as he would crash out on lap 5 after getting turned by Brad Keselowski and collecting Bowyer, Jamie McMurray, and Bobby Labonte in the process while bringing out the first caution of the night. The race would restart on lap 9. On lap 16, Martin's teammate Dale Earnhardt Jr. would take the lead with the other teammate Jimmie Johnson pushing him. On lap 17, Kurt Busch would take the lead with Regan Smith behind him. On lap 18, Carl Edwards took the lead with his teammate Greg Biffle for a brief moment before Busch took it back in turn 3. On lap 19, Edwards would take the lead. Busch would take it back the next lap. Unfortunetly for Edwards, his chances on winning vanished as on lap 23 he got turned off of turn 4 by his teammate Greg Biffle and would hit the inside wall on the right rear of the car. This would also end up with him losing the points lead to Kevin Harvick. The race would restart on lap 27 with Kevin Harvick leading. On the restart, Harvick's partner Paul Menard switched spots with him and Menard was the new leader. On lap 28, David Ragan would take the lead with Matt Kenseth behind him. On lap 29, Regan Smith took the lead with Kurt Busch behind him. On lap 31, Martin Truex Jr. took the lead with David Reutimann behind him. On lap 37, David Ragan took the lead. On lap 41, Kasey Kahne took the lead with Brian Vickers behind him after Ragan and Kenseth swapped. On lap 42, Matt Kenseth took the lead but Martin Truex Jr. would take it on that same lap. Kenseth would take it and hold on to it the next lap. Unfortunately, a bad night would get a lot worse for Carl Edwards as Edwards had no crush panel to help him breathe from inside the racecar as he drove around without one for over 20 laps and ended up getting sick and actually throwing up from the inside of his helmet and all over his suit and the car. Edwards would come down pit road to get the crush panel on and to clean himself and his car. At the same time, the third caution would fly when Dave Blaney would get turned by Geoff Bodine and hit the wall on the frontstretch going into turn 1. Kasey Kahne won the race off of pit road and he would lead the field to the restart on lap 54. On the restart, Kahne didn't have a drafting partner as his teammate Brian Vickers restarted in 8th and lost the lead where Martin Truex Jr. would take the lead with his teammate David Reutimann. On lap 58, Regan Smith took the lead with Kurt Busch behind him. On lap 60, Matt Kenseth would take the lead with David Ragan. On lap 64, Kasey Kahne would take the lead with Brian Vickers. On lap 65, Paul Menard would take the lead with Kevin Harvick. Kahne would take it back the next lap. On lap 70, Tony Stewart would take the lead with David Gilliland. On lap 71, Martin Truex Jr. would take the lead. On lap 74, Kasey Kahne would take the lead. On lap 75, Casey Mears took the lead with Landon Cassill behind him. On lap 77, Joe Nemechek took the lead with Travis Kvapil pushing him. On lap 78, Kasey Kahne took the lead. On lap 86, Kyle Busch took the lead with Joey Logano behind him. On lap 89, Kasey Kahne took the lead. On lap 90, Paul Menard took the lead. Soon, green flag pitstops would begin on lap 91. On lap 93, Kyle Busch took the lead. Busch would pit on lap 94 giving the lead to Casey Mears. Mears would pit on lap 95 giving the lead to Jeff Burton. On lap 98, Clint Bowyer would take the lead as he and Burton swapped positions. Both Bowyer and Burton would pit on lap 99 giving the lead to Brian Vickers where he would be passed by Martin Truex Jr. by lap 100. On lap 101, Kyle Busch took the lead. On lap 103, Martin Truex Jr. would take the lead after Busch and Logano swapped positions. On lap 104, David Ragan would take the lead. On lap 106, Ryan Newman would take the lead with Denny Hamlin behind him. Newman and Hamlin would swap the next lap giving the lead to Hamlin.

=== Final laps ===
With 50 laps to go, Martin Truex Jr. took the lead but got passed by Brad Keselowski and Keselowski took the lead with Greg Biffle behind him. With 49 to go, Keselowski and Biffle swapped and Biffle took the lead. With 48 to go, Martin Truex Jr. took the lead but got passed by Juan Pablo Montoya and Montoya took the lead with Jamie McMurray behind him. With 46 to go, Kevin Harvick took the lead with Paul Menard behind him after Montoya and McMurray switched. With 45 to go, Jamie McMurray took the lead. Harvick would take it back the next lap. With 39 to go, Harvick's teammate Clint Bowyer took the lead. With 38 to go, Ryan Newman took the lead. With 31 to go, green flag pitstops would begin once again for the last time. With 30 to go, Kyle Busch took the lead. With 26 to go, Kevin Harvick took the lead. With 19 to go, Harvick and his teammate Paul Menard pitted with Harvick keeping his lead until with 18 to go when Ryan Newman took the lead. With 7 to go Matt Kenseth took the lead with David Ragan behind him. With 3 to go, Ryan Newman took the lead. Newman was looking for his first win of the season. At the same time, the 4th caution would fly for a five car incident in turns 3 and 4 involving Kasey Kahne, Kyle Busch, Joey Logano, Jeff Gordon, and Juan Pablo Montoya that saw Gordon spin and somehow not damage his car. The caution would set up three attempts of a green-white-checkered. On the restart, David Ragan took the lead. Ragan was looking for redemption when in the Daytona 500, Ragan was leading on a restart but changed lanes before the start-finish line which was illegal and got him black flagged which handed the win to Trevor Bayne. But in turn 2, the first big wreck would occur taking out 15 cars and the 5th caution to fly. It started when Mark Martin tried to go down in front of Joey Logano but ended up turning across Logano's nose and getting sideways. This would cause multiple cars to check up and stack up which would cause the big wreck. The cars involved were Mark Martin, Brian Vickers, Joey Logano, Martin Truex Jr., Clint Bowyer, Joe Nemechek, Regan Smith, Landon Cassill, Kasey Kahne, Casey Mears, Travis Kvapil, Tony Stewart, Kurt Busch, David Reutimann, and David Gilliland. The wreck would set up a second attempt of a GWC. On the restart, David Ragan and Ryan Newman were side by side with Ragan getting pushed by Matt Kenseth and Newman getting pushed by Denny Hamlin. Eventually, Joey Logano had a big run and made it three wide for the lead with Kasey Kahne behind him and ended up causing Newman and Hamlin to fall back in the pack. Ragan would take the lead and take the white flag. On the last lap, 15 cars would be involved in two separate accidents on the final two turns. The first one being in turn 3 when Landon Cassill turned Marcos Ambrose while also collecting David Reutimann, Tony Stewart, and Brian Vickers. The second being off of turn 4 when Jamie McMurray got into Dale Earnhardt Jr. causing both to spin and collecting Denny Hamlin, Kurt Busch, Jeff Burton, Travis Kvapil, Ryan Newman, Juan Pablo Montoya, A. J. Allmendinger, Jimmie Johnson, and Regan Smith. As a result of the accidents, the 6th and final caution would fly just before the cars crossed the finish line and David Ragan would make it up for the Daytona 500 mistake and score his first career Cup Series win in his 163rd Cup Series start. Matt Kenseth, Joey Logano, Kasey Kahne, and Kyle Busch would round out the top 5 while Jeff Gordon, Kevin Harvick, Paul Menard, Juan Pablo Montoya, and A. J. Allmendinger rounded out the top 10.

== Results ==
=== Qualifying ===
Grid	No.	Driver	Team	Manufacturer	Time	Speed
1	5	Mark Martin	Hendrick Motorsports	Chevrolet	49.433	182.065
2	21	Trevor Bayne (R)	Wood Brothers Racing	Ford	49.450	182.002
3	33	Clint Bowyer	Richard Childress Racing	Chevrolet	49.553	181.624
4	24	Jeff Gordon	Hendrick Motorsports	Chevrolet	49.564	181.583
5	6	David Ragan	Roush Fenway Racing	Ford	49.636	181.320
6	88	Dale Earnhardt Jr.	Hendrick Motorsports	Chevrolet	49.658	181.240
7	71	Andy Lally (R)	TRG Motorsports	Ford	49.713	181.039
8	48	Jimmie Johnson	Hendrick Motorsports	Chevrolet	49.725	180.995
9	43	A. J. Allmendinger	Richard Petty Motorsports	Ford	49.738	180.948
10	27	Paul Menard	Richard Childress Racing	Chevrolet	49.742	180.934
11	39	Ryan Newman	Stewart–Haas Racing	Chevrolet	49.753	180.894
12	31	Jeff Burton	Richard Childress Racing	Chevrolet	49.784	180.781
13	4	Kasey Kahne	Red Bull Racing	Toyota	49.792	180.752
14	99	Carl Edwards	Roush Fenway Racing	Ford	49.793	180.748
15	9	Marcos Ambrose	Richard Petty Motorsports	Ford	49.794	180.745
16	17	Matt Kenseth	Roush Fenway Racing	Ford	49.817	180.661
17	16	Greg Biffle	Roush Fenway Racing	Ford	49.839	180.581
18	1	Jamie McMurray	Earnhardt Ganassi Racing	Chevrolet	49.842	180.571
19	14	Tony Stewart	Stewart–Haas Racing	Chevrolet	49.848	180.549
20	83	Brian Vickers	Red Bull Racing	Toyota	49.870	180.469
21	51	Landon Cassill	Phoenix Racing	Chevrolet	49.905	180.343
22	97	Kevin Conway	NEMCO Motorsports	Toyota	49.914	180.310
23	00	David Reutimann	Michael Waltrip Racing	Toyota	49.918	180.296
24	47	Bobby Labonte	JTG Daugherty Racing	Toyota	49.933	180.242
25	22	Kurt Busch	Penske Racing	Dodge	49.952	180.173
26	2	Brad Keselowski	Penske Racing	Dodge	49.989	180.040
27	38	Travis Kvapil	Front Row Motorsports	Ford	50.040	179.856
28	78	Regan Smith	Furniture Row Racing	Chevrolet	50.041	179.853
29	60	Mike Skinner	Germain Racing	Toyota	50.060	179.784
30	42	Juan Pablo Montoya	Earnhardt Ganassi Racing	Chevrolet	50.074	179.734
31	29	Kevin Harvick	Richard Childress Racing	Chevrolet	50.097	179.651
32	13	Casey Mears	Germain Racing	Toyota	50.107	179.616
33	66	Michael McDowell	HP Racing	Toyota	50.110	179.605
34	56	Martin Truex Jr.	Michael Waltrip Racing	Toyota	50.158	179.433
35	35	Geoff Bodine	Tommy Baldwin Racing	Chevrolet	50.206	179.261
36	11	Denny Hamlin	Joe Gibbs Racing	Toyota	50.215	179.229
37	20	Joey Logano	Joe Gibbs Racing	Toyota	50.256	179.083
38	18	Kyle Busch	Joe Gibbs Racing	Toyota	50.320	178.855
39	34	David Gilliland	Front Row Motorsports	Ford	50.379	178.646
40	36	Dave Blaney	Tommy Baldwin Racing	Chevrolet	50.387	178.618
41	32	Terry Labonte	FAS Lane Racing	Ford	50.396	178.586
42	7	Mike Bliss	Robby Gordon Motorsports	Dodge	50.589	177.904
43	87	Joe Nemechek	NEMCO Motorsports	Toyota	50.255	179.087
	Failed to Qualify					
	37	Tony Raines	Max Q Motorsports	Ford	50.459	178.363
	46	J. J. Yeley	Whitney Motorsports	Chevrolet	51.209	175.750
Withdrew	81	Scott Riggs	Whitney Motorsports	Chevrolet	00.000	000.000
	Source:					

=== Race results ===
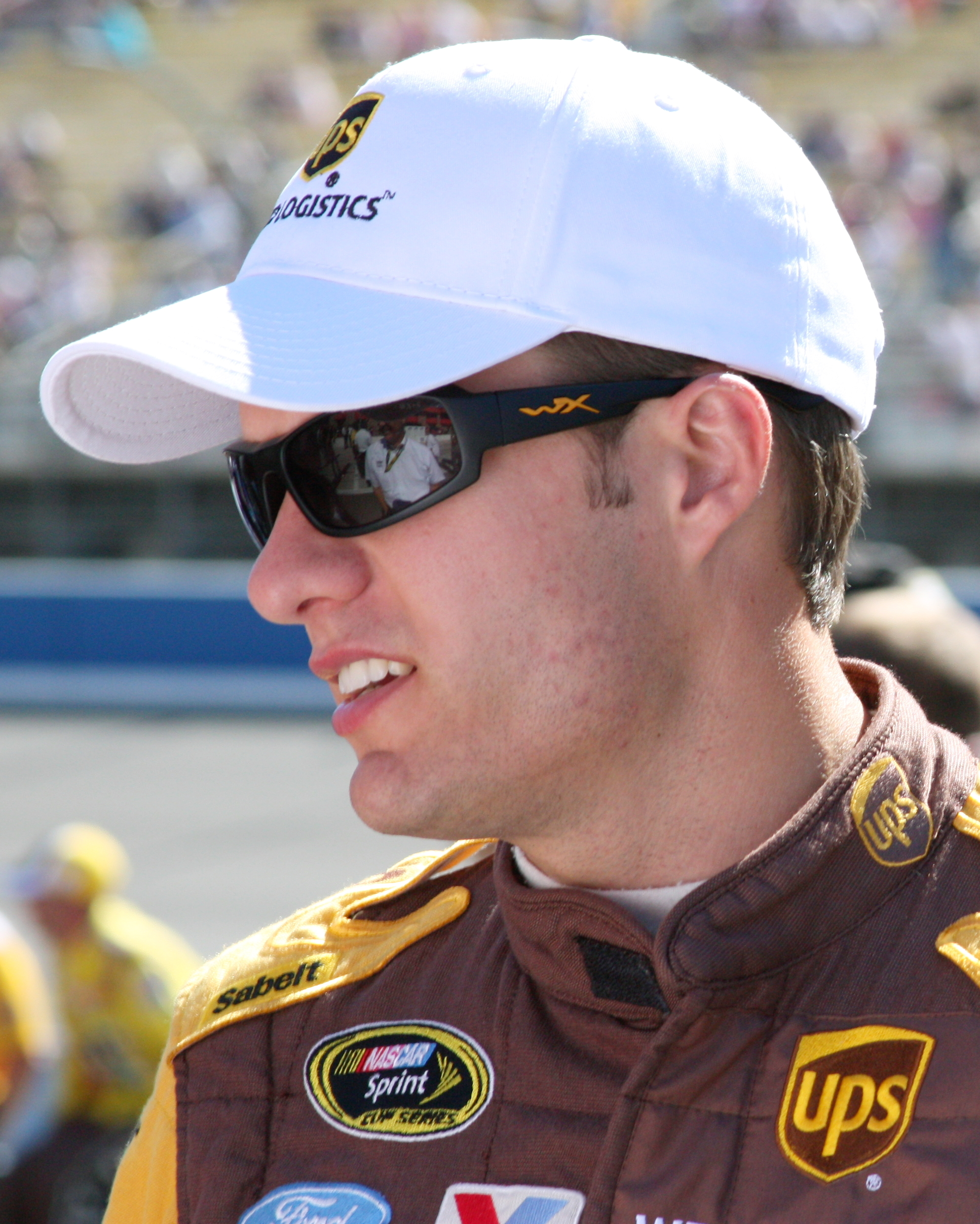
David Ragan scored his first career Cup Series win.

Pos	No.	Driver	Team	Manufacturer	Laps Run	Led	Status	Points
1	6	David Ragan	Roush Fenway Racing	Ford	170	15	running	47
2	17	Matt Kenseth	Roush Fenway Racing	Ford	170	14	running	43
3	20	Joey Logano	Joe Gibbs Racing	Toyota	170	0	running	41
4	4	Kasey Kahne	Red Bull Racing	Toyota	170	19	running	41
5	18	Kyle Busch	Joe Gibbs Racing	Toyota	170	11	running	40
6	24	Jeff Gordon	Hendrick Motorsports	Chevrolet	170	1	running	39
7	29	Kevin Harvick	Richard Childress Racing	Chevrolet	170	16	running	38
8	27	Paul Menard	Richard Childress Racing	Chevrolet	170	5	running	37
9	42	Juan Pablo Montoya	Earnhardt Ganassi Racing	Chevrolet	170	2	running	36
10	43	A. J. Allmendinger	Richard Petty Motorsports	Ford	170	0	running	34
11	14	Tony Stewart	Stewart–Haas Racing	Chevrolet	170	1	running	34
12	83	Brian Vickers	Red Bull Racing	Toyota	170	0	running	32
13	11	Denny Hamlin	Joe Gibbs Racing	Toyota	170	4	running	32
14	22	Kurt Busch	Penske Racing	Dodge	170	6	running	31
15	2	Brad Keselowski	Pesnke Racing	Dodge	170	1	running	30
16	34	David Gilliland	Front Row Motorsports	Ford	170	0	running	28
17	9	Marcos Ambrose	Richard Petty Motorsports	Ford	170	0	running	27
18	16	Greg Biffle	Roush Fenway Racing	Ford	170	1	running	27
19	88	Dale Earnhardt Jr.	Hendrick Motorsports	Chevrolet	170	1	running	26
20	48	Jimmie Johnson	Hendrick Motorsports	Chevrolet	170	0	running	24
21	31	Jeff Burton	Richard Childress Racing	Chevrolet	170	3	running	24
22	1	Jamie McMurray	Earnhardt Ganassi Racing	Chevrolet	170	1	running	23
23	39	Ryan Newman	Stewart–Haas Racing	Chevrolet	170	25	running	23
24	78	Regan Smith	Furniture Row Racing	Chevrolet	170	4	running	21
25	00	David Reutimann	Michael Waltrip Racing	Toyota	170	0	running	19
26	51	Landon Cassill	Phoenix Racing	Chevrolet	169	0	running	0
27	71	Andy Lally (R)	TRG Motorsports	Ford	169	0	running	17
28	32	Terry Labonte	FAS Lane Racing	Ford	169	0	running	16
29	38	Travis Kvapil	Front Row Motorsports	Ford	169	1	running	0
30	87	Joe Nemechek	NEMCO Motorsports	Toyota	169	1	running	0
31	47	Bobby Labonte	JTG Daugherty Racing	Toyota	168	0	running	13
32	13	Casey Mears	Germain Racing	Toyota	164	3	running	13
33	5	Mark Martin	Hendrick Motorsports	Chevrolet	164	15	running	12
34	7	Robby Gordon	Robby Gordon Motorsports	Dodge	163	0	running	10
35	56	Martin Truex Jr.	Michael Waltrip Racing	Toyota	162	16	crash	10
36	33	Clint Bowyer	Richard Childress Racing	Chevrolet	162	3	crash	9
37	99	Carl Edwards	Roush Fenway Racing	Ford	144	1	running	8
38	35	Geoff Bodine	Tommy Baldwin Racing	Chevrolet	143	0	wheel bearing	6
39	36	Dave Blaney	Tommy Baldwin Racing	Chevrolet	47	0	crash	5
40	60	Mike Skinner	Germain Racing	Toyota	5	0	wheel bearing	0
41	21	Trevor Bayne (R)	Wood Brothers Racing	Ford	4	0	crash	0
42	66	Michael McDowell	HP Racing	Toyota	2	0	electrical	2
43	97	Kevin Conway	NEMCO Motorsports	Toyota	1	0	rear gear	0

=== Standings after the race ===
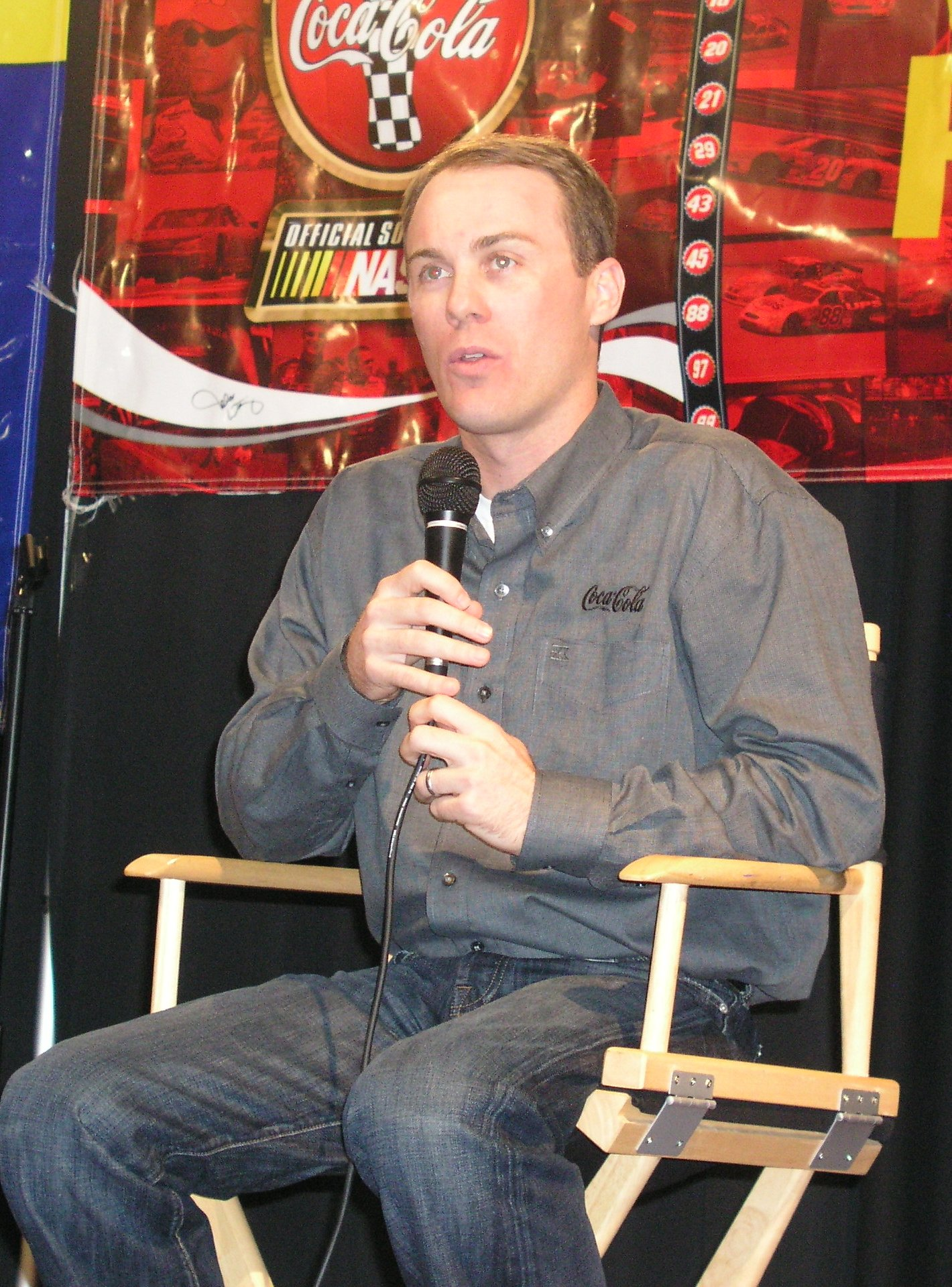
Kevin Harvick led the points standings after the race.

Pos	Driver	Points
1	Kevin Harvick	586
2	Carl Edwards	581
3	Kyle Busch	576
4	Kurt Busch	570
5	Matt Kenseth	564
6	Jimmie Johnson	564
7	Dale Earnhardt Jr.	534
8	Jeff Gordon	519
9	Clint Bowyer	505
10	Ryan Newman	498

Previous race: 2011 Toyota/Save Mart 350	Sprint Cup Series; 2011 season	Next race: 2011 Quaker State 400
