= Stephen Leicht =

American racing driver (born 1987)

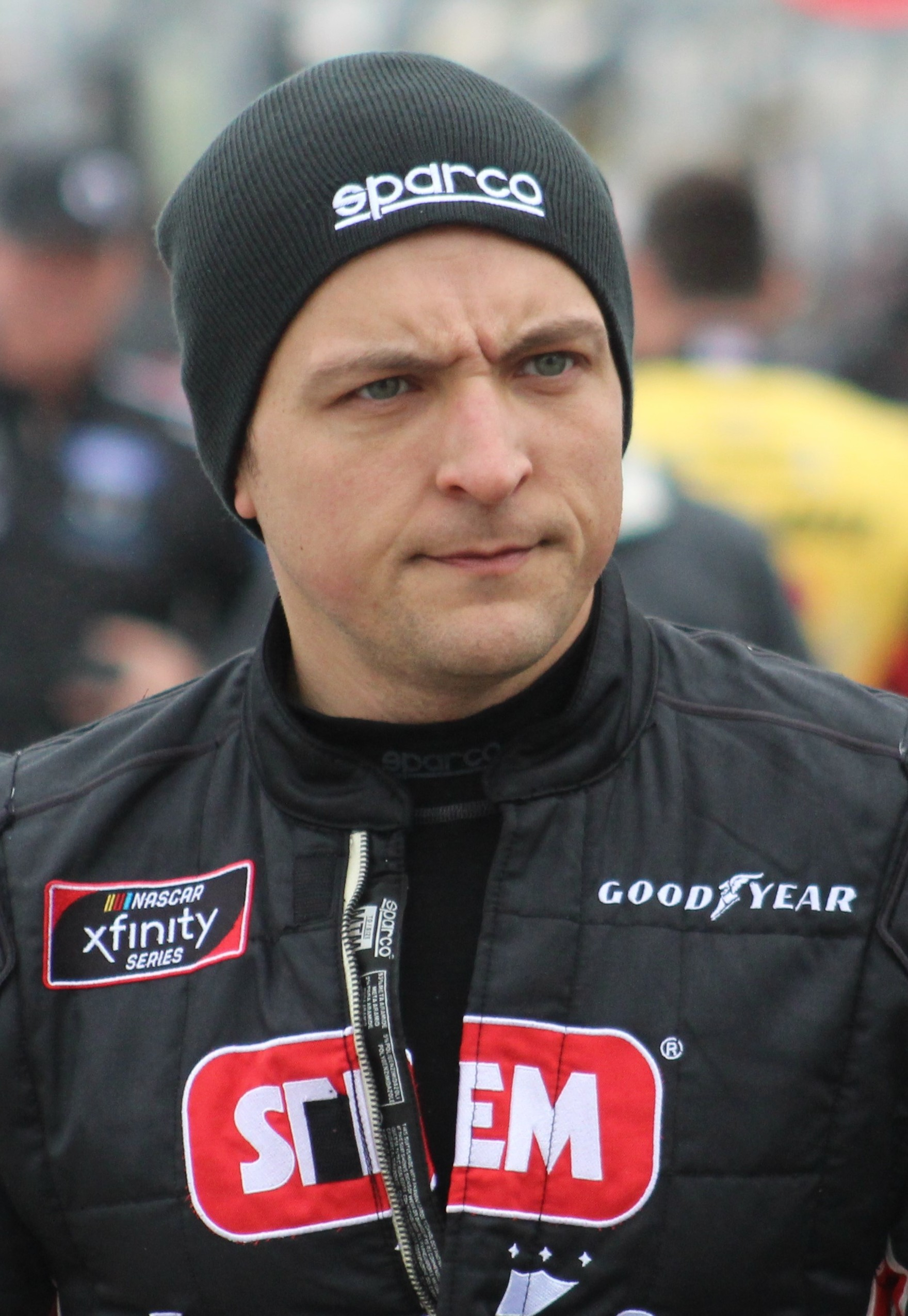
- Leicht at Atlanta Motor Speedway in 2019
- Born: Stephen Russell Leicht; January 9, 1987 (age 39); Asheville, North Carolina, U.S.
- Achievements: 2005 American Speed Association Late Model Champion
- Awards: 2012 NASCAR Sprint Cup Series Rookie of the Year

NASCAR Cup Series career
- 18 races run over 4 years
- 2017 position: 63rd
- Best finish: 41st (2012)
- First race: 2006 Pennsylvania 500 (Pocono)
- Last race: 2017 Overton's 400 (Pocono)
Wins	Top tens	Poles
0	0	0

NASCAR O'Reilly Auto Parts Series career
- 161 races run over 11 years
- 2021 position: 51st
- Best finish: 7th (2007)
- First race: 2005 Sam's Town 250 (Memphis)
- Last race: 2021 Dead On Tools 250 (Martinsville)
- First win: 2007 Meijer 300 (Kentucky)
Wins	Top tens	Poles
1	17	0

NASCAR FedEx Freight Truck Series career
- 4 races run over 1 year
- 2012 position: 98th
- Best finish: 98th (2012)
- First race: 2012 VFW 200 (Michigan)
- Last race: 2012 Lucas Oil 150 (Phoenix)
Wins	Top tens	Poles
0	0	0

ARCA Menards Series career
- 3 races run over 2 years
- Best finish: 85th (2006)
- First race: 2006 ARCA Daytona 200 (Daytona)
- Last race: 2023 General Tire 150 (Charlotte)
- First win: 2006 PFG Lester 150 (Nashville)
Wins	Top tens	Poles
1	1	0
- Statistics up to date as of May 10, 2024.

Stephen Russell Leicht (born January 9, 1987) is an American professional stock car racing driver who last competed part-time in the ARCA Menards Series, driving the No. 31 Chevrolet for Rise Motorsports. He has previously competed in the NASCAR Cup Series (where he was the 2012 Rookie of the Year) NASCAR Xfinity Series and the NASCAR Truck Series. Leicht also has over 150 feature event wins in quarter midgets and go-kart racing.

== Racing career ==
=== Early career ===
When he was seven years old, Leicht began racing quarter midgets and began advancing into go-karts. At the age of eleven, Leicht was participating in the Go Kart Nationals, when he collided with the flag stand and was sent flying from his racecar. He suffered a burst spleen as a result of the accident, and was kept out of racing for six months.

At the age of twelve, Leicht began racing stock cars and got his GED to focus full-time on racing, and was named Motorsports Magazines Rising Star of the Year in 2000. At the age of fifteen, he ran his first full year in the American Racing Association and was named Rookie of the Year.

=== NASCAR and ARCA career ===
In 2005, Leicht moved to Wisconsin to work with veteran American Speed Association crew chief Howie Lettow. Leicht collected five wins en route to winning the national championship in the American Speed Association Late Model series for WalTom Racing. He won both races that he attempted in the American StockCar League. He finished first or second in thirteen of sixteen events that entered between the two series. He started eighth in his Busch series debut at Memphis Motorsports Park, and finished thirteenth. He ran another race at Phoenix, starting seventeenth and finishing nineteenth.

In 2006, Leicht ran ARCA Re/Max Series events for Yates Racing and WalTom Racing. He earned his first career ARCA series win in his second career start at Nashville Superspeedway in April. He also made four Busch series starts in 2006, posting two top-ten qualifying efforts. On July 23, he made his first Nextel Cup Series start in the Pennsylvania 500 at Pocono Raceway for Yates Racing, qualifying 36th and finishing 33rd, one lap behind.

In 2007, Leicht ran the full NASCAR Busch Series schedule. He won his first race at Kentucky Speedway and finished seventh in the final drivers' points ranking. At the end of the season, Robert Yates Racing released Leicht from his contract because of sponsorship and finance issues. 2008 saw Leicht land a part-time stint in Richard Childress' No. 21 Nationwide car, sharing driving duties with Bobby Labonte. Leicht ran four races with a best finish of seventh at Phoenix International Raceway. However, after Talladega, a lack of sponsorship sidelined Leicht until Texas in the fall, where he finished eighteenth.

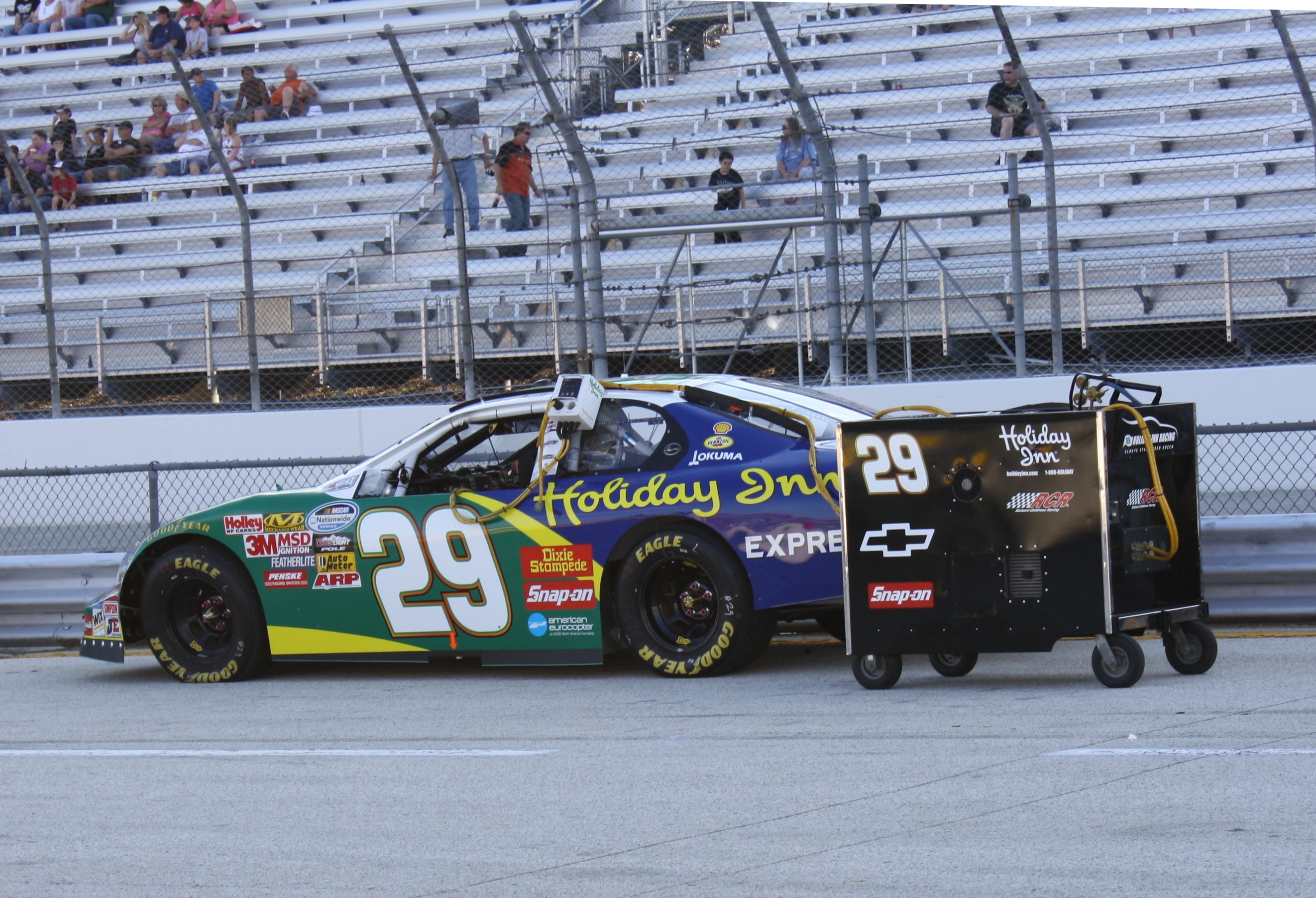
Leicht's Nationwide car in 2009 at Milwaukee

In 2009, Leicht drove the No. 29 Chevrolet Impala in thirteen races. Leicht was originally slated to run 23 events, but his races were nearly halved by the addition of Clint Bowyer as co-driver. He ran nine total races and had six top-ten finishes. He was released from RCR at the end of the year and signed to attempt 29 races for D'Hondt Humphrey Motorsports in the No. 91 car in 2010, but was released after two races.

Leicht competed in his first NASCAR race since 2009 (and his first Sprint Cup start since 2006) in Tommy Baldwin Racing's No. 36 Chevrolet in 2011, while regular driver Dave Blaney piloted the team's second car, the No. 35 Chevrolet. The move gave Leicht a guaranteed start while Blaney had to qualify on time. Blaney finished nineteenth while Leicht finished 24th despite running in the top-ten most of the race.

Leicht drove for Joe Falk at Richmond in April 2012, qualifying 40th and finishing 35th, running at the end but finishing nine laps down. After skipping Talladega, he filed to compete for Rookie of the Year in the Sprint Cup Series, with plans to run the majority of the remainder of the season in the No. 33, except for the June race in Michigan, when Richard Childress Racing driver Austin Dillon drove the No. 33.

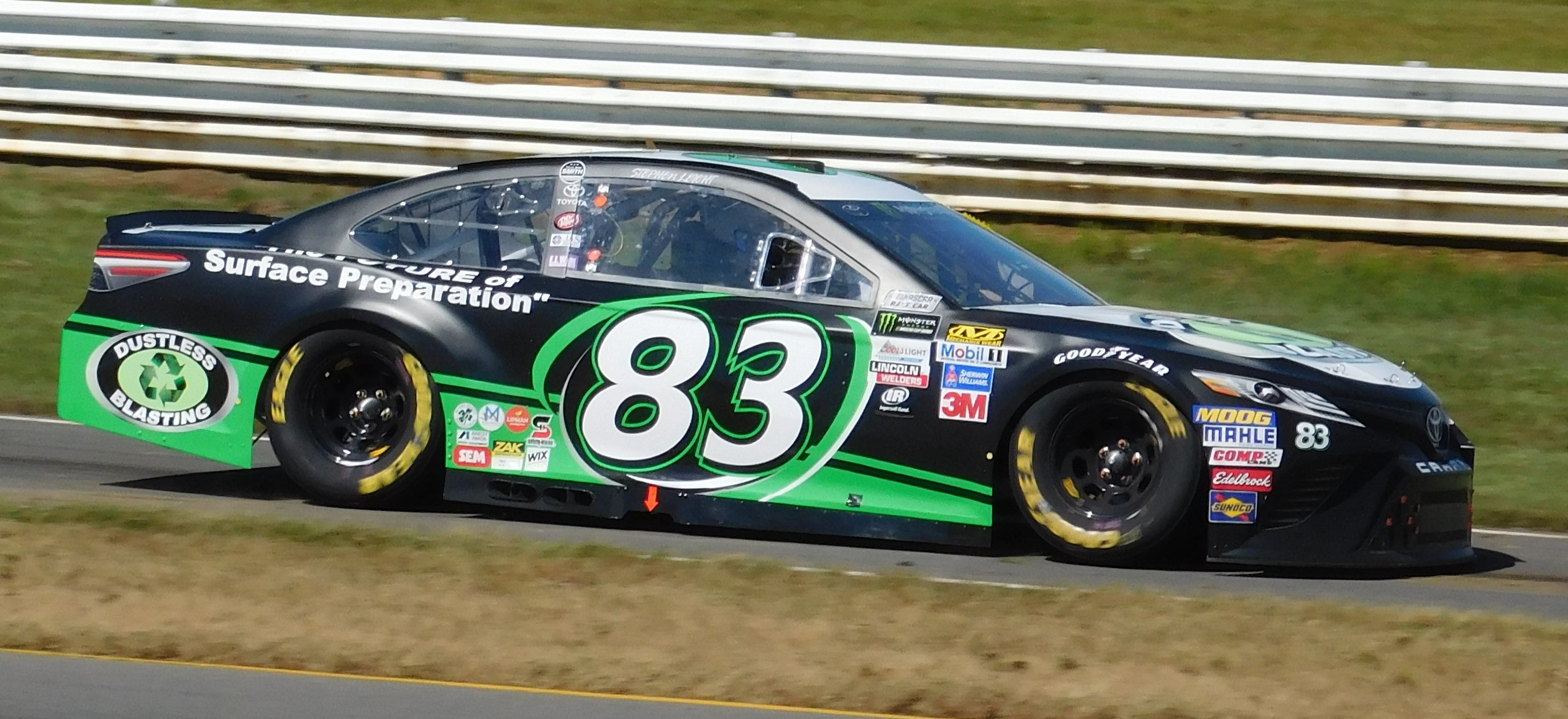
Leicht's No. 83 car at Pocono Raceway in 2017

Leicht's best finish of 2012 was 26th at Watkins Glen, ending on the lead lap. He attempted 21 races and competed in fifteen, and won the series Rookie of the Year award for 2012. After a four-year absence in NASCAR, on January 10, 2017, Leicht received a ride to drive the No. 77 Chevrolet Camaro for Obaika Racing starting at Daytona. However, Leicht moved to Obaika's primary No. 97 car for Daytona, causing the No. 77 to withdraw. Leicht attempted the first six races in the 97 as a start and park operation. Leicht only qualified for four races, failing to qualify at Daytona and Texas. Leicht was left without a ride when the 97 scaled back its schedule after the sixth race. Leicht raced at Charlotte in the No. 93 for RSS Racing, start and parking the car. In July, Leicht made his return to the Cup Series at Pocono, driving the No. 83 for BK Racing.

On January 22, 2018, it was announced that Leicht is tabbed as a full-time driver for a newly formed team JP Motorsports. Leicht finished fifteenth after avoiding multiple crashes at Daytona. He was replaced by Jennifer Jo Cobb at Talladega since she brought sponsorship. On May 22, 2018, it was announced that Leicht and JP Motorsports parted ways and was replaced by Brandon Hightower. On July 28, Leicht returned to No. 93 for RSS Racing at Iowa Speedway start and parked it. The following week, Leicht drove the No. 74 for Mike Harmon Racing at Watkins Glen International, where he didn't qualify for the race.

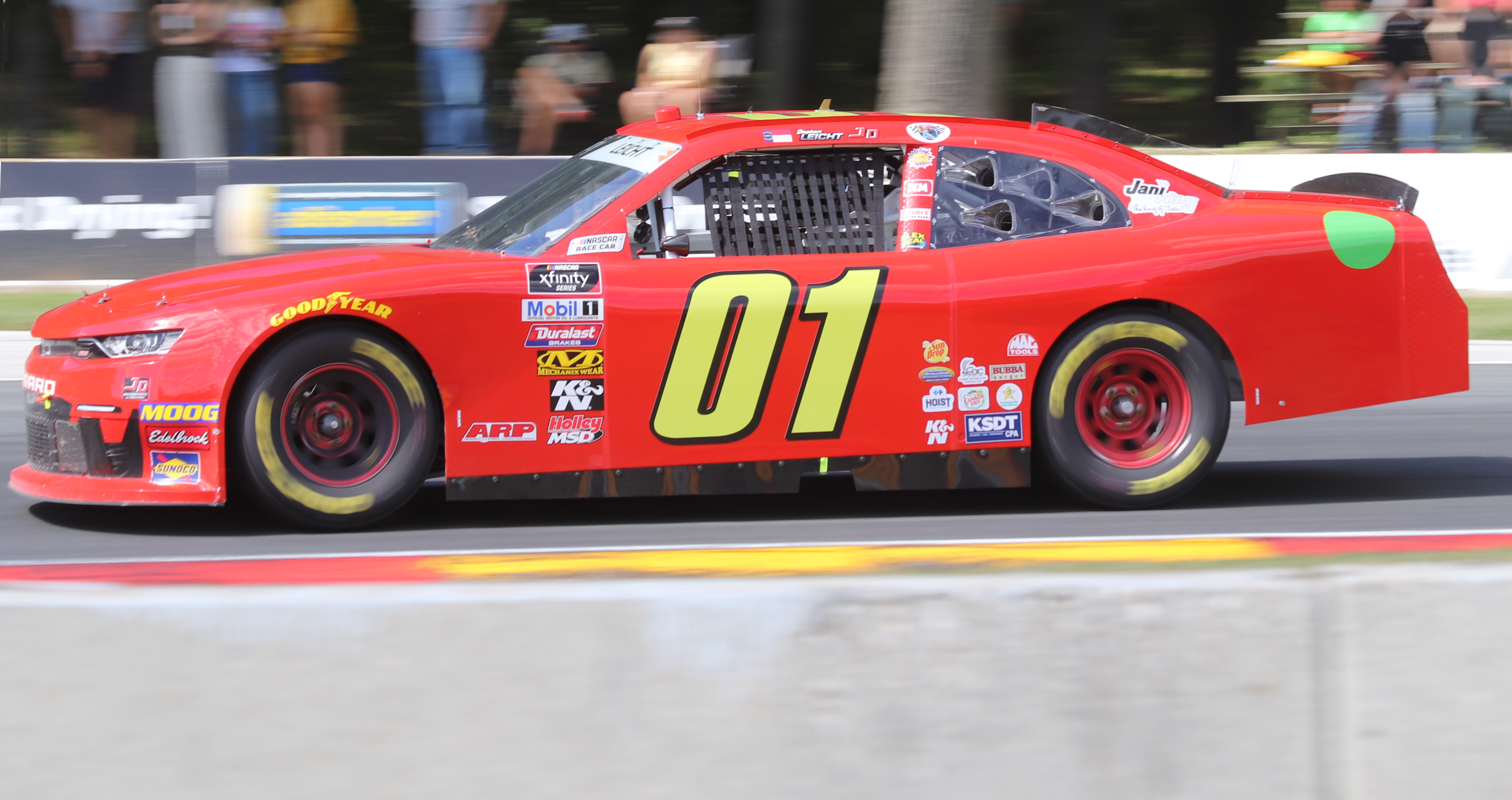
Leicht's 2019 Xfinity car at Road America

In February 2019, it was announced that Leicht will drive the No. 01 full-time for JD Motorsports. After one season with JD, Leicht moved over to Carl Long's MBM Motorsports No. 61 car for 2020 having his best finish of 21st at the Pennzoil 150.

For 2021, Leicht would attempt five races in the No. 61 MBM Motorsports Toyota and three races in the No. 13. The first race for Leicht was the Super Start Batteries 188, he also was scheduled to drive in the Pit Boss 250 but failed to qualify. He was also scheduled to drive in the B&L Transport 170, but he was replaced by David Starr after Starr DNQed in the No. 13 also for MBM Motorsports.

After being without a ride in 2022, Leicht returned to racing in 2023 in ARCA, returning to the series for the first time since 2006, driving the No. 31 car for Rise Motorsports.

== Personal life ==
After finding himself out of a ride after winning Cup Series Rookie of the year in 2012, Leicht worked for a time at a car dealership in Cornelius, North Carolina for a short period of time. During downswings in his racing career, Leicht suffered from clinical depression and eventually went to counseling to treat it.

== Motorsports career results ==
=== NASCAR ===
(key) (Bold – Pole position awarded by qualifying time. Italics – Pole position earned by points standings or practice time. * – Most laps led.)

==== Monster Energy Cup Series ====
Monster Energy NASCAR Cup Series results
Year	Team	No.	Make	1	2	3	4	5	6	7	8	9	10	11	12	13	14	15	16	17	18	19	20	21	22	23	24	25	26	27	28	29	30	31	32	33	34	35	36	MENCC	Pts	Ref
2006	Robert Yates Racing	90	Ford	DAY	CAL	LVS	ATL	BRI	MAR	TEX	PHO	TAL	RCH	DAR	CLT	DOV	POC	MCH	SON	DAY	CHI	NHA	POC; 33	IND; DNQ	GLN	MCH	BRI	CAL	RCH	NHA	DOV	KAN	TAL	CLT	MAR	ATL	TEX	PHO	HOM	78th	0	
2011	Tommy Baldwin Racing	36	Chevy	DAY	PHO	LVS	BRI	CAL	MAR	TEX	TAL	RCH	DAR	DOV	CLT	KAN	POC	MCH	SON	DAY	KEN	NHA	IND	POC	GLN	MCH	BRI	ATL	RCH; 24											46th	20	
2011	Tommy Baldwin Racing	35	Chevy																											CHI; DNQ	NHA	DOV	KAN	CLT	TAL	MAR	TEX	PHO	HOM	46th	20	
2012	Circle Sport	33	Chevy	DAY	PHO	LVS	BRI	CAL	MAR	TEX	KAN	RCH; 35	TAL	DAR; DNQ	CLT; 39	DOV; 35	POC; 33	MCH	SON; 41	KEN; 41	DAY; 42	NHA; 32	IND; 31	POC; DNQ	GLN; 26	MCH; DNQ	BRI; 40	ATL; DNQ	RCH; 36	CHI	NHA; 34	DOV	TAL	CLT	KAN	MAR; 34	TEX; DNQ	PHO; 35	HOM; DNQ	41st	117	
2017	BK Racing	83	Toyota	DAY	ATL	LVS	PHO	CAL	MAR	TEX	BRI	RCH	TAL	KAN	CLT	DOV	POC	MCH	SON	DAY	KEN	NHA	IND	POC; 32	GLN	MCH	BRI	DAR	RCH	CHI	NHA	DOV	CLT	TAL	KAN	MAR	TEX	PHO	HOM	63rd	0^{1}	

==== Xfinity Series ====
NASCAR Xfinity Series results
Year	Team	No.	Make	1	2	3	4	5	6	7	8	9	10	11	12	13	14	15	16	17	18	19	20	21	22	23	24	25	26	27	28	29	30	31	32	33	34	35	NXSC	Pts	Ref
2005	Robert Yates Racing	90	Ford	DAY	CAL	MXC	LVS	ATL	NSH	BRI	TEX	PHO	TAL	DAR	RCH	CLT	DOV	NSH	KEN	MLW	DAY	CHI	NHA	PPR	GTY	IRP	GLN	MCH	BRI	CAL	RCH	DOV	KAN	CLT	MEM; 13	TEX	PHO; 15	HOM	86th	242	
2006	Robert Yates Racing	90	Ford	DAY	CAL	MXC	LVS; 18	ATL	BRI	TEX; 20	NSH	PHO	TAL; 31	RCH	DAR; 25	CLT	DOV	NSH	KEN; 10	MLW; 13	DAY; 26	CHI	NHA; 33	MAR	GTY; 38	IRP	GLN; 36	MCH; 33	BRI; 35	CAL; 33	RCH	DOV; 23	KAN; 12	CLT; 14	MEM; 19	TEX; 19	PHO; 27	HOM; 27	32nd	1790	
2007	Robert Yates Racing	90	Ford	DAY; 33	CAL; 20	MXC; 27	LVS; 18	ATL; 29	BRI; 20	NSH; 8	TEX; 20	PHO; 28	TAL; 28	RCH; 24	DAR; 26	CLT; 10	DOV; 34	NSH; 33	KEN; 1	MLW; 14	NHA; 25	DAY; 27	CHI; 10	GTY; 23	IRP; 24	CGV; 5	GLN; 17	MCH; 26	BRI; 20	CAL; 29	RCH; 21	DOV; 41	KAN; 19	CLT; 18	MEM; 12	TEX; 10	PHO; 19	HOM; 5	7th	3603	
2008	Richard Childress Racing	21	Chevy	DAY	CAL; 10	LVS	ATL	BRI	NSH; 12	TEX	PHO; 7	MXC	TAL; 34	RCH	DAR	CLT	DOV	NSH	KEN																	TEX; 18	PHO	HOM	60th	577	
2008	Richard Childress Racing	2	Chevy																	MLW; QL^{†}	NHA	DAY	CHI	GTY	IRP	CGV	GLN	MCH	BRI	CAL	RCH	DOV	KAN	CLT	MEM; QL^{†}				60th	577	
2009	Richard Childress Racing	29	Chevy	DAY	CAL	LVS	BRI	TEX	NSH; 11	PHO	TAL	RCH	DAR	CLT	DOV	NSH; 6	KEN; 31	MLW; 8	NHA	DAY	CHI	GTY; 6	IRP; 13	IOW; 10	GLN	MCH	BRI	CGV; 8	ATL	RCH	DOV	KAN	CAL	CLT	MEM; 9	TEX	PHO	HOM	43rd	1185	
2010	D'Hondt Humphrey Motorsports	91	Chevy	DAY	CAL; DNQ	LVS; DNQ	BRI	NSH	PHO	TEX	TAL	RCH	DAR	DOV	CLT	NSH	KEN	ROA	NHA	DAY	CHI	GTY	IRP	IOW	GLN	MCH	BRI	CGV	ATL	RCH	DOV	KAN	CAL	CLT	GTY	TEX	PHO	HOM	NA	–	
2012	The Motorsports Group	47	Chevy	DAY	PHO	LVS	BRI	CAL	TEX	RCH	TAL	DAR	IOW	CLT	DOV	MCH	ROA	KEN	DAY; 42	NHA; 42	CHI; 41	IND; 43	IOW	GLN; 42	CGV	BRI; DNQ	ATL	RCH	CHI	KEN	DOV	CLT	KAN	TEX	PHO	HOM			128th	0^{1}	
2017	Obaika Racing	97	Chevy	DAY; DNQ	ATL; 38	LVS; 39	PHO; 37	CAL; 39	TEX; DNQ	BRI; Wth	RCH	TAL																											82nd	2^{2}	
2017	RSS Racing	93	Chevy										CLT; 40	DOV	POC	MCH	IOW	DAY	KEN	NHA	IND	IOW	GLN	MOH	BRI	ROA	DAR	RCH	CHI	KEN	DOV	CLT	KAN	TEX	PHO				82nd	2^{2}	
2017	RSS Racing	39	Chevy																																	HOM; 35			82nd	2^{2}	
2018	JP Motorsports	55	Toyota	DAY; 15	ATL; 32	LVS; 30	PHO; 31	CAL; 31	TEX; 37	BRI; 28	RCH; 37	TAL	DOV; 33	CLT	POC	MCH	IOW	CHI	DAY	KEN	NHA																		43rd	81	
2018	RSS Racing	93	Chevy																			IOW; 39																	43rd	81	
2018	Mike Harmon Racing	74	Dodge																				GLN; DNQ	MOH; 37		ROA; 33	DAR	IND	LVS	RCH	CLT								43rd	81	
2018	Mike Harmon Racing	74	Chevy																						BRI; 31														43rd	81	
2018	B. J. McLeod Motorsports	99	Chevy																													DOV; 40	KAN; 32	TEX; 37	PHO; 38	HOM; DNQ			43rd	81	
2019	JD Motorsports	01	Chevy	DAY; 38	ATL; 25	LVS; 27	PHO; 31	CAL; 22	TEX; 22	BRI; 32	RCH; 18	TAL; 24	DOV; 26	CLT; 15	POC; 23	MCH; 20		CHI; 21	DAY; 5	KEN; 24			GLN; 20	MOH; 32	BRI; 19	ROA; 34		IND; 23	LVS; 21		CLT; 19	DOV; 23	KAN; 27	TEX; 19	PHO; 21	HOM; 24			18th	449	
2019	JD Motorsports	4	Chevy														IOW; 25				NHA; 23	IOW; 16								RCH; 29									18th	449	
2019	JD Motorsports	15	Chevy																								DAR; 26												18th	449	
2020	MBM Motorsports	66	Toyota	DAY	LVS; 34	CAL; 35	PHO; 33	DAR; 39	CLT	BRI; 34	ATL; 36	HOM; 36	HOM; 38	TAL	POC; 27		KEN; 35	KEN; 34	TEX; 35	KAN; 37						DAR; 35			BRI; 36	LVS	TAL		KAN; 35	TEX	MAR	PHO			35th	138	
2020	MBM Motorsports	61	Toyota													IND; 21					ROA; 22	DAY; 21	DOV; 22	DOV; 31	DAY														35th	138	
2020	MBM Motorsports	13	Toyota																								RCH; 34	RCH; 22				CLT; 24							35th	138	
2021	MBM Motorsports	61	Toyota	DAY	DAY; 29	HOM	LVS	PHO	ATL	MAR	TAL	DAR	DOV	COA; DNQ	CLT	MOH	TEX	NSH	POC				GLN; 28					RCH; 38	BRI	LVS	TAL	CLT	TEX	KAN	MAR; 21				51st	45	
2021	MBM Motorsports	13	Toyota																	ROA; 26	ATL	NHA		IND; DNQ	MCH	DAY	DAR									PHO; DNQ			51st	45	
^{†} – Qualified for Clint Bowyer

==== Camping World Truck Series ====
NASCAR Camping World Truck Series results
Year	Team	No.	Make	1	2	3	4	5	6	7	8	9	10	11	12	13	14	15	16	17	18	19	20	21	22	NCWTC	Pts	Ref
2012	Hillman Racing	25	Chevy	DAY	MAR	CAR	KAN	CLT	DOV	TEX	KEN	IOW	CHI	POC	MCH; 30	BRI								PHO; 31	HOM	98th	0^{1}	
2012	Hillman Racing	27	Chevy														ATL; 34	IOW	KEN	LVS	TAL	MAR	TEX; 32			98th	0^{1}	

=== ARCA Menards Series ===
(key) (Bold – Pole position awarded by qualifying time. Italics – Pole position earned by points standings or practice time. * – Most laps led.)

ARCA Menards Series results
Year	Team	No.	Make	1	2	3	4	5	6	7	8	9	10	11	12	13	14	15	16	17	18	19	20	21	22	23	AMSC	Pts	Ref
2006	Robert Yates Racing	66	Ford	DAY; 25																							85th	345	
2006	Robert Yates Racing	55	Ford		NSH; 1*	SLM	WIN	KEN	TOL	POC	MCH	KAN	KEN	BLN	POC	GTW	NSH	MCH	ISF	MIL	TOL	DSF	CHI	SLM	TAL	IOW	85th	345	
2023	Rise Motorsports	31	Chevy	DAY	PHO	TAL	KAN	CLT; 25	BLN	ELK	MOH	IOW	POC	MCH	IRP	GLN	ISF	MLW	DSF	KAN	BRI	SLM	TOL				112th	19	

=== CARS Late Model Stock Car Tour ===
(key) (Bold – Pole position awarded by qualifying time. Italics – Pole position earned by points standings or practice time. * – Most laps led. ** – All laps led.)

CARS Late Model Stock Car Tour results
Year	Team	No.	Make	1	2	3	4	5	6	7	8	9	10	CLMSCTC	Pts	Ref
2016	Lee Faulk Racing	5	Chevy	SNM	ROU	HCY	TCM	GRE	ROU	CON; 7	MYB; 15	HCY; 10	SNM	21st	68	

=== CARS Super Late Model Tour ===
(key)

CARS Super Late Model Tour results
Year	Team	No.	Make	1	2	3	4	5	6	7	8	9	10	CSLMTC	Pts	Ref
2015	Lee Faulk Racing	25	Chevy	SNM; 16	ROU; 11	**HCY**; 27	SNM; 18	TCM; 21	MMS; 7	ROU; 17	CON	MYB	HCY	15th	123	
2016	Lee Faulk Racing	25	Chevy	SNM; 17	ROU; 14	HCY; 22	TCM; 13	GRE; 15	ROU	CON	MYB	HCY; 15	SNM	15th	102	

=== CARS Pro Late Model Tour ===
(key)

CARS Pro Late Model Tour results
Year	Team	No.	Make	1	2	3	4	5	6	7	8	9	10	11	12	CPLMTC	Pts	Ref
2022	N/A	99	Ford	CRW	HCY	GPS	FCS	TCM	HCY; 7	ACE	MMS	TCM; 9	ACE	SBO	CRW	22nd	50	

^{*} Season still in progress
^{1} Ineligible for series points
^{2} Leicht began the 2017 season racing for Cup Series points but switched to Xfinity Series points before the race at Homestead-Miami Speedway

Achievements
Preceded by Andy Lally	NASCAR Sprint Cup Series Rookie of the Year; 2012	Succeeded by Ricky Stenhouse Jr.
