= 2017 Overton's 400 =

Race details
- Race 21 of 36 in the 2017 Monster Energy NASCAR Cup Series
- 2017 Overton's 400 program cover
- Date: July 30, 2017
- Location: Pocono Raceway in Long Pond, Pennsylvania
- Course: Permanent racing facility
- Course length: 2.5 miles (4 km)
- Distance: 160 laps, 400 mi (640 km)
- Average speed: 141.080 miles per hour (227.046 km/h)

Pole position
Driver	Kyle Busch	Joe Gibbs Racing
- Time: 50.175

Most laps led
Driver	Kyle Busch	Joe Gibbs Racing
- Laps: 74

Winner
No. 18	Kyle Busch	Joe Gibbs Racing

Television in the United States
- Network: NBCSN
- Announcers: Rick Allen, Dale Jarrett, Jeff Burton and Steve Letarte

Radio in the United States
- Radio: MRN
- Booth announcers: Joe Moore, Jeff Striegle and Rusty Wallace
- Turn announcers: Dave Moody (1), Mike Bagley (2) and Kyle Rickey (3)

The 2017 Overton's 400, was a Monster Energy NASCAR Cup Series race held on July 30, 2017 at Pocono Raceway in Long Pond, Pennsylvania. Contested over 160 laps on the 2.5-mile (4.0 km) superspeedway, it was the 21st race of the 2017 Monster Energy NASCAR Cup Series season.

== Entry list ==
No.	Driver	Team	Manufacturer
1	Jamie McMurray	Chip Ganassi Racing	Chevrolet
2	Brad Keselowski	Team Penske	Ford
3	Austin Dillon	Richard Childress Racing	Chevrolet
4	Kevin Harvick	Stewart–Haas Racing	Ford
5	Kasey Kahne	Hendrick Motorsports	Chevrolet
6	Trevor Bayne	Roush Fenway Racing	Ford
10	Danica Patrick	Stewart–Haas Racing	Ford
11	Denny Hamlin	Joe Gibbs Racing	Toyota
13	Ty Dillon (R)	Germain Racing	Chevrolet
14	Clint Bowyer	Stewart–Haas Racing	Ford
15	Gray Gaulding (R)	Premium Motorsports	Chevrolet
17	Ricky Stenhouse Jr.	Roush Fenway Racing	Ford
18	Kyle Busch	Joe Gibbs Racing	Toyota
19	Daniel Suárez (R)	Joe Gibbs Racing	Toyota
20	Matt Kenseth	Joe Gibbs Racing	Toyota
21	Ryan Blaney	Wood Brothers Racing	Ford
22	Joey Logano	Team Penske	Ford
23	Corey LaJoie (R)	BK Racing	Toyota
24	Chase Elliott	Hendrick Motorsports	Chevrolet
27	Paul Menard	Richard Childress Racing	Chevrolet
31	Ryan Newman	Richard Childress Racing	Chevrolet
32	Matt DiBenedetto	Go Fas Racing	Ford
33	Jeffrey Earnhardt	Circle Sport – The Motorsports Group	Chevrolet
34	Landon Cassill	Front Row Motorsports	Ford
37	Chris Buescher	JTG Daugherty Racing	Chevrolet
38	David Ragan	Front Row Motorsports	Ford
41	Kurt Busch	Stewart–Haas Racing	Ford
42	Kyle Larson	Chip Ganassi Racing	Chevrolet
43	Aric Almirola	Richard Petty Motorsports	Ford
47	A. J. Allmendinger	JTG Daugherty Racing	Chevrolet
48	Jimmie Johnson	Hendrick Motorsports	Chevrolet
55	Derrike Cope	Premium Motorsports	Toyota
72	Cole Whitt	TriStar Motorsports	Chevrolet
77	Erik Jones (R)	Furniture Row Racing	Toyota
78	Martin Truex Jr.	Furniture Row Racing	Toyota
83	Stephen Leicht	BK Racing	Toyota
88	Dale Earnhardt Jr.	Hendrick Motorsports	Chevrolet
95	Michael McDowell	Leavine Family Racing	Chevrolet
Official entry list

== Practice ==
=== First practice ===
Matt Kenseth was the fastest in the first practice session with a time of 51.114 seconds and a speed of 176.077 mph (283.368 km/h).

Pos	No.	Driver	Team	Manufacturer	Time	Speed
1	20	Matt Kenseth	Joe Gibbs Racing	Toyota	51.114	176.077
2	42	Kyle Larson	Chip Ganassi Racing	Chevrolet	51.149	175.957
3	77	Erik Jones (R)	Furniture Row Racing	Toyota	51.307	175.415
Official first practice results

=== Final practice ===
Kyle Busch was the fastest in the final practice session with a time of 50.898 seconds and a speed of 176.824 mph (284.571 km/h).

Pos	No.	Driver	Team	Manufacturer	Time	Speed
1	18	Kyle Busch	Joe Gibbs Racing	Toyota	50.898	176.824
2	42	Kyle Larson	Chip Ganassi Racing	Chevrolet	51.163	175.908
3	1	Jamie McMurray	Chip Ganassi Racing	Chevrolet	51.239	175.647
Official final practice results

== Qualifying ==
Kyle Busch scored the pole for the race with a time of 50.175 and a speed of 179.372 mph (288.671 km/h).

=== Qualifying results ===
Pos	No.	Driver	Team	Manufacturer	R1	R2	R3
1	18	Kyle Busch	Joe Gibbs Racing	Toyota	51.526	50.629	50.175
2	78	Martin Truex Jr.	Furniture Row Racing	Toyota	50.872	50.729	50.317
3	1	Jamie McMurray	Chip Ganassi Racing	Chevrolet	51.003	50.974	50.552
4	11	Denny Hamlin	Joe Gibbs Racing	Toyota	51.215	50.606	50.635
5	21	Ryan Blaney	Wood Brothers Racing	Ford	50.988	50.802	50.682
6	4	Kevin Harvick	Stewart–Haas Racing	Ford	51.245	50.948	50.708
7	14	Clint Bowyer	Stewart–Haas Racing	Ford	51.344	51.001	50.801
8	19	Daniel Suárez (R)	Joe Gibbs Racing	Toyota	50.948	50.856	50.844
9	77	Erik Jones (R)	Furniture Row Racing	Toyota	51.125	51.034	50.869
10	22	Joey Logano	Team Penske	Ford	51.401	51.022	50.986
11	2	Brad Keselowski	Team Penske	Ford	51.200	51.065	51.046
12	5	Kasey Kahne	Hendrick Motorsports	Chevrolet	51.184	51.024	51.206
13	24	Chase Elliott	Hendrick Motorsports	Chevrolet	51.439	51.116	—
14	48	Jimmie Johnson	Hendrick Motorsports	Chevrolet	51.504	51.167	—
15	20	Matt Kenseth	Joe Gibbs Racing	Toyota	51.389	51.236	—
16	42	Kyle Larson	Chip Ganassi Racing	Chevrolet	51.141	51.296	—
17	95	Michael McDowell	Leavine Family Racing	Chevrolet	51.487	51.356	—
18	41	Kurt Busch	Stewart–Haas Racing	Ford	51.141	51.375	—
19	6	Trevor Bayne	Roush Fenway Racing	Ford	51.393	51.446	—
20	31	Ryan Newman	Richard Childress Racing	Chevrolet	51.310	51.576	—
21	17	Ricky Stenhouse Jr.	Roush Fenway Racing	Ford	51.418	51.576	—
22	10	Danica Patrick	Stewart–Haas Racing	Ford	51.455	51.577	—
23	88	Dale Earnhardt Jr.	Hendrick Motorsports	Chevrolet	51.500	51.684	—
24	37	Chris Buescher	JTG Daugherty Racing	Chevrolet	51.508	52.108	—
25	43	Aric Almirola	Richard Petty Motorsports	Ford	51.563	—	—
26	3	Austin Dillon	Richard Childress Racing	Chevrolet	51.567	—	—
27	27	Paul Menard	Richard Childress Racing	Chevrolet	51.615	—	—
28	47	A. J. Allmendinger	JTG Daugherty Racing	Chevrolet	51.906	—	—
29	32	Matt DiBenedetto	Go Fas Racing	Ford	52.056	—	—
30	13	Ty Dillon (R)	Germain Racing	Chevrolet	52.098	—	—
31	34	Landon Cassill	Front Row Motorsports	Ford	52.435	—	—
32	72	Cole Whitt	TriStar Motorsports	Chevrolet	52.450	—	—
33	38	David Ragan	Front Row Motorsports	Ford	52.507	—	—
34	23	Corey LaJoie (R)	BK Racing	Toyota	52.581	—	—
35	15	Gray Gaulding (R)	Premium Motorsports	Chevrolet	53.228	—	—
36	83	Stephen Leicht	BK Racing	Toyota	55.445	—	—
37	55	Derrike Cope	Premium Motorsports	Toyota	57.440	—	—
38	33	Jeffrey Earnhardt	Circle Sport – The Motorsports Group	Chevrolet	0.000	—	—
Official qualifying results

== Race ==
=== First stage ===
Kyle Busch led the field to the green flag at 3:20 p.m. The field didn't complete a full lap when rounding the third turn, Matt Kenseth got loose and spun, triggering an eight-car wreck that brought out the first caution. Aric Almirola took the worst damage on his way to a last-place finish.

Back to green on the eighth lap, cars started hitting pit road to short-pit the first stage on Lap 15. Busch pitted from the lead on Lap 22, as did Erik Jones after a four-lap stint in front. Ricky Stenhouse Jr. led the next 11 circuits, before diving onto pit road on Lap 37, cycling the lead to Kenseth. He didn't hold the lead for long, however, as Busch passed him going into Turn 1 to take the lead on Lap 42 and drove on to win the first stage that concluded on Lap 51. He opted to pit under the stage break, while Kenseth stayed out to retake the lead. Teammate Denny Hamlin restarted from the tail-end of the field for speeding.

=== Second stage ===
On fresher tires, Busch powered by the outside of Kenseth in Turn 3 to return to the lead on the Lap 56 restart. When the field came back through Turn 3 a lap later, Jimmie Johnson spun, after contact with teammate Kasey Kahne, and hit the wall, bringing out the third caution.

The race restarted on Lap 62. A drive-shaft piece that came from Kyle Larson's car brought out the fourth caution on Lap 70. Hamlin stayed out to get the race lead, but was relegated to second on the restart, bumping up Austin Dillon, for not maintaining pace car speed.

It made no difference, however, as Hamlin regained the lead going into Turn 1 on the Lap 75 restart. He led the next 15 laps, before Martin Truex Jr. got to his inside exiting Turn 1 and took the lead heading down the Long Pond Straightaway. Truex was among a slew of cars that opted to short-pit for the position to win towards the end of the second stage on Lap 98, handing the lead to Clint Bowyer, who won the stage on Lap 101. Truex resumed his place up front when Bowyer pitted.

=== Final stage ===
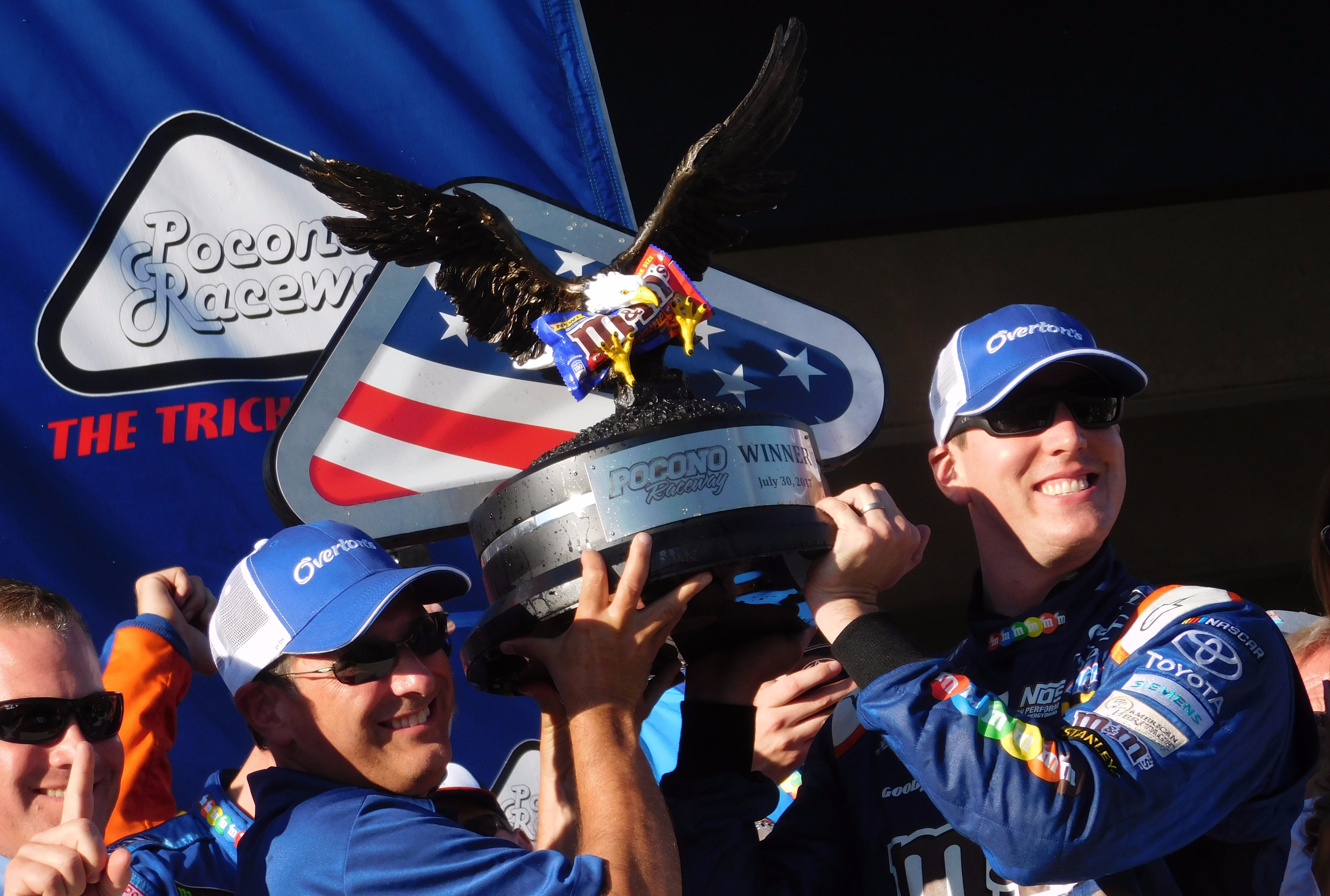
Kyle Busch celebrating in Victory Lane after winning the 2017 Overton's 400.

The race restarted on Lap 106. Cars started hitting pit road for their final pit stop with 37 laps to go. Race leader Truex pitted with 34 to go, handing the lead to Busch, who had yet to pit. He did so with 25 to go, handing the lead to Brad Keselowski. When he stopped five laps later, the lead cycled to Hamlin. During the cycle, Joey Logano was hit with a pass through penalty for speeding, and a stop and go penalty for pitting to service his car during his pass through.

With 17 to go, Kevin Harvick took the lead from Hamlin going into Turn 1. But Busch caught Harvick going into Turn 3, bumped him out of the racing groove and drove on to victory.

== Race results ==
=== Stage results ===
Stage 1 Laps: 50

Pos	No	Driver	Team	Manufacturer	Points
1	18	Kyle Busch	Joe Gibbs Racing	Toyota	10
2	78	Martin Truex Jr.	Furniture Row Racing	Toyota	9
3	4	Kevin Harvick	Stewart–Haas Racing	Ford	8
4	2	Brad Keselowski	Team Penske	Ford	7
5	21	Ryan Blaney	Wood Brothers Racing	Ford	6
6	1	Jamie McMurray	Chip Ganassi Racing	Chevrolet	5
7	11	Denny Hamlin	Joe Gibbs Racing	Toyota	4
8	14	Clint Bowyer	Stewart–Haas Racing	Ford	3
9	42	Kyle Larson	Chip Ganassi Racing	Chevrolet	2
10	24	Chase Elliott	Hendrick Motorsports	Chevrolet	1
Official stage one results

Stage 2 Laps: 50

Pos	No	Driver	Team	Manufacturer	Points
1	14	Clint Bowyer	Stewart–Haas Racing	Ford	10
2	2	Brad Keselowski	Team Penske	Ford	9
3	10	Danica Patrick	Stewart–Haas Racing	Ford	8
4	41	Kurt Busch	Stewart–Haas Racing	Ford	7
5	31	Ryan Newman	Richard Childress Racing	Chevrolet	6
6	5	Kasey Kahne	Hendrick Motorsports	Chevrolet	5
7	17	Ricky Stenhouse Jr.	Roush Fenway Racing	Ford	4
8	6	Trevor Bayne	Roush Fenway Racing	Ford	3
9	95	Michael McDowell	Leavine Family Racing	Chevrolet	2
10	47	A. J. Allmendinger	JTG Daugherty Racing	Chevrolet	1
Official stage two results

=== Final stage results ===
Stage 3 Laps: 60

Pos	Grid	No	Driver	Team	Manufacturer	Laps	Points
1	1	18	Kyle Busch	Joe Gibbs Racing	Toyota	160	50
2	6	4	Kevin Harvick	Stewart–Haas Racing	Ford	160	43
3	2	78	Martin Truex Jr.	Furniture Row Racing	Toyota	160	43
4	4	11	Denny Hamlin	Joe Gibbs Racing	Toyota	160	37
5	11	2	Brad Keselowski	Team Penske	Ford	160	48
6	7	14	Clint Bowyer	Stewart–Haas Racing	Ford	160	44
7	8	19	Daniel Suárez (R)	Joe Gibbs Racing	Toyota	160	30
8	9	77	Erik Jones (R)	Furniture Row Racing	Toyota	160	29
9	15	20	Matt Kenseth	Joe Gibbs Racing	Toyota	160	28
10	13	24	Chase Elliott	Hendrick Motorsports	Chevrolet	160	28
11	12	5	Kasey Kahne	Hendrick Motorsports	Chevrolet	160	31
12	23	88	Dale Earnhardt Jr.	Hendrick Motorsports	Chevrolet	160	25
13	18	41	Kurt Busch	Stewart–Haas Racing	Ford	160	31
14	20	31	Ryan Newman	Richard Childress Racing	Chevrolet	160	29
15	22	10	Danica Patrick	Stewart–Haas Racing	Ford	160	30
16	21	17	Ricky Stenhouse Jr.	Roush Fenway Racing	Ford	160	25
17	30	13	Ty Dillon (R)	Germain Racing	Chevrolet	159	20
18	17	95	Michael McDowell	Leavine Family Racing	Chevrolet	159	21
19	27	27	Paul Menard	Richard Childress Racing	Chevrolet	159	18
20	19	6	Trevor Bayne	Roush Fenway Racing	Ford	159	20
21	26	3	Austin Dillon	Richard Childress Racing	Chevrolet	159	16
22	33	38	David Ragan	Front Row Motorsports	Ford	159	15
23	28	47	A. J. Allmendinger	JTG Daugherty Racing	Chevrolet	159	15
24	32	72	Cole Whitt	TriStar Motorsports	Chevrolet	159	13
25	34	23	Corey LaJoie (R)	BK Racing	Toyota	159	12
26	3	1	Jamie McMurray	Chip Ganassi Racing	Chevrolet	159	16
27	10	22	Joey Logano	Team Penske	Ford	159	10
28	24	37	Chris Buescher	JTG Daugherty Racing	Chevrolet	159	9
29	31	34	Landon Cassill	Front Row Motorsports	Ford	158	8
30	5	21	Ryan Blaney	Wood Brothers Racing	Ford	158	13
31	35	15	Gray Gaulding (R)	Premium Motorsports	Chevrolet	157	6
32	36	83	Stephen Leicht	BK Racing	Toyota	153	5
33	16	42	Kyle Larson	Chip Ganassi Racing	Chevrolet	148	6
34	37	55	Derrike Cope	Premium Motorsports	Toyota	85	3
35	14	48	Jimmie Johnson	Hendrick Motorsports	Chevrolet	57	2
36	38	33	Jeffrey Earnhardt	Circle Sport – The Motorsports Group	Chevrolet	24	1
37	29	32	Matt DiBenedetto	Go Fas Racing	Ford	1	1
38	25	43	Aric Almirola	Richard Petty Motorsports	Ford	0	1
Official race results

=== Race statistics ===
- Lead changes: 9 among different drivers
- Cautions/Laps: 5 for 21
- Red flags: 0
- Time of race: 2 hours, 50 minutes and 7 seconds
- Average speed: 141.080 miles per hour (227.046 km/h)

== Media ==
=== Television ===
NBC Sports covered the race on the television side. Rick Allen and Dale Jarrett had the call from the regular booth for the race. Jeff Burton and Steve Letarte had the call in the new NBC's stock car smarts booth for the race. Dave Burns, Marty Snider and Kelli Stavast reported from pit lane during the race.

NBCSN
Booth announcers	Pit reporters
Lap-by-lap: Rick Allen; Color Commentator Dale Jarrett; Stock Car Smarts Booth Analyst: Jeff Burton; Stock Car Smarts Booth Analyst: Steve Letarte	Dave Burns; Marty Snider; Kelli Stavast

=== Radio ===
Motor Racing Network had the radio call for the race, which was simulcast on Sirius XM NASCAR Radio.

MRN
Booth announcers	Turn announcers	Pit reporters
Lead announcer: Joe Moore; Announcer: Jeff Striegle; Announcer: Rusty Wallace	Turn 1: Dave Moody; Turns 2: Mike Bagley; Turn 3: Kyle Rickey	Alex Hayden; Winston Kelley; Steve Post

== Standings after the race ==
Drivers' Championship standings

	Pos	Driver	Points
	1	Martin Truex Jr.	823
	2	Kyle Larson	738 (–85)
	3	Kevin Harvick	726 (–97)
	4	Kyle Busch	723 (–100)
1	5	Brad Keselowski	649 (–174)
1	6	Denny Hamlin	649 (–174)
1	7	Chase Elliott	616 (–207)
1	8	Jamie McMurray	615 (–208)
	9	Matt Kenseth	594 (–229)
1	10	Clint Bowyer	577 (–246)
1	11	Jimmie Johnson	566 (–257)
	12	Ryan Blaney	529 (–294)
	13	Joey Logano	525 (–298)
	14	Kurt Busch	494 (–329)
	15	Ryan Newman	491 (–332)
1	16	Erik Jones	469 (–354)
Official driver's standings

Manufacturers' Championship standings

Pos	Manufacturer	Points
1	Chevrolet	746
2	Ford	744 (–2)
3	Toyota	724 (–22)
Official manufacturers' standings

- Note: Only the first 16 positions are included for the driver standings.
- . – Driver has clinched a position in the Monster Energy NASCAR Cup Series playoffs.

Previous race: 2017 Brickyard 400	Monster Energy NASCAR Cup Series; 2017 season	Next race: 2017 I Love New York 355 at The Glen
