= 2012 FedEx 400 =

2012 FedEx 400 benefiting Autism Speaks
Race details
- Race 13 of 36 in the 2012 NASCAR Sprint Cup Series
- Date: June 3, 2012
- Location: Dover International Speedway in Dover, Delaware
- Course: Permanent racing facility
- Course length: 1 miles (1.6 km)
- Distance: 400 laps, 400 mi (643.737 km)
- Weather: Clear with a temperature near 76 °F (24 °C); wind out of the W at 15 mph (24 km/h).
- Average speed: 122.835 miles per hour (197.684 km/h)

Pole position
Driver	Mark Martin	Michael Waltrip Racing
- Time: 22.742

Most laps led
Driver	Jimmie Johnson	Hendrick Motorsports
- Laps: 289

Winner
No. 48	Jimmie Johnson	Hendrick Motorsports

Television in the United States
- Network: Fox
- Announcers: Mike Joy, Darrell Waltrip and Larry McReynolds

The 2012 FedEx 400 was a NASCAR Sprint Cup Series stock car race held on June 3, 2012 at Dover International Speedway in Dover, Delaware. Contested over 400 laps, it was the thirteenth race of the 2012 season. Jimmie Johnson of Hendrick Motorsports took his second win of the season, while Kevin Harvick finished second and Matt Kenseth finished third.

There were seven cautions and seventeen lead changes among seven different drivers during the race. Johnson's win maintained his fifth-place position in the drivers' championship, 33 points behind leader Greg Biffle and twelve ahead of Martin Truex Jr. in sixth. Chevrolet led the Manufacturer Championship with 90 points, sixteen ahead of Toyota and 23 ahead of Ford in third.

== Report ==
=== Background ===
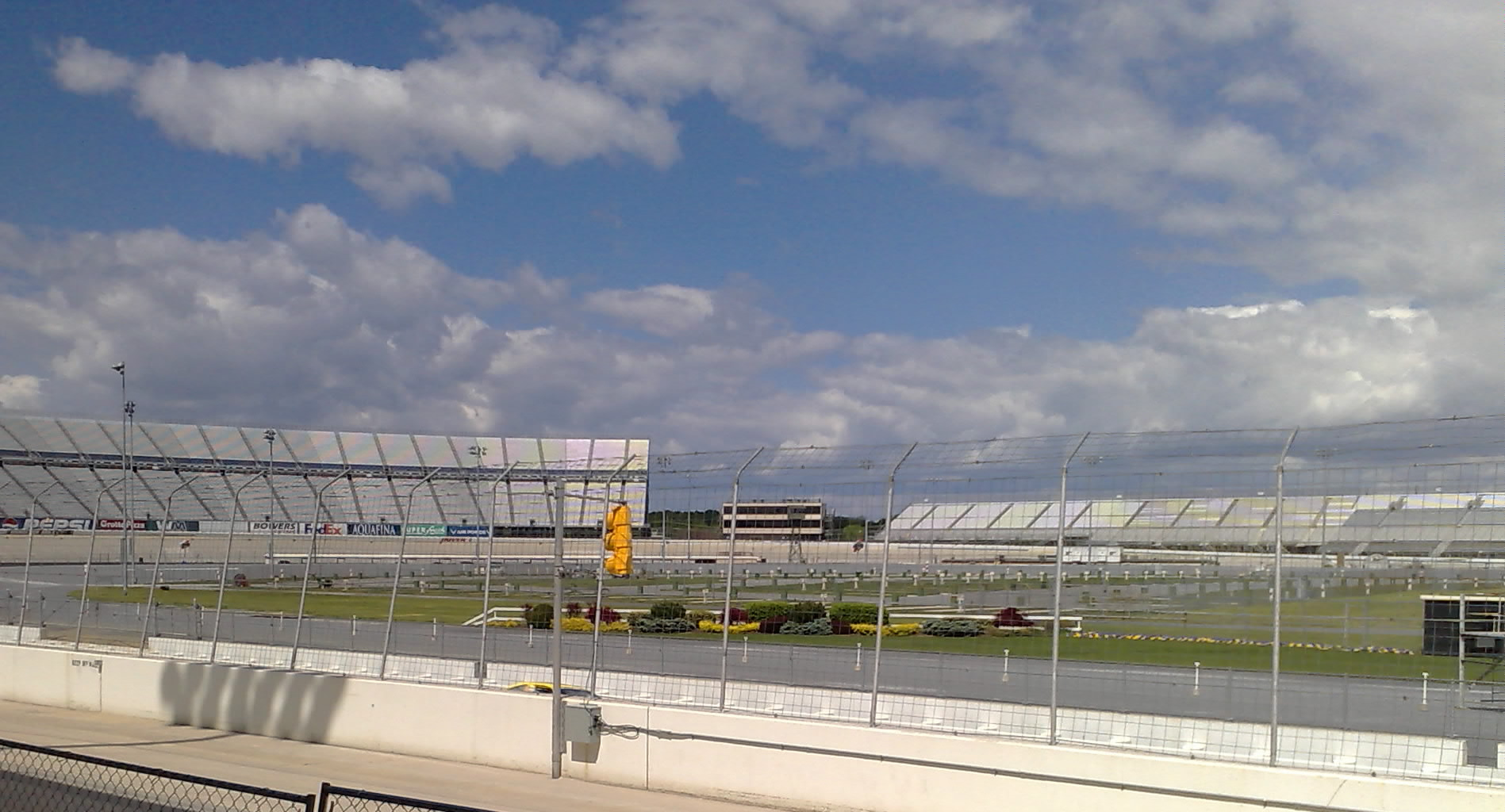
Dover International Speedway, where the race was held

Dover International Speedway is one of five short tracks to hold NASCAR races; the others are Bristol Motor Speedway, Richmond International Raceway, Martinsville Speedway, and Phoenix International Raceway. The NASCAR race makes use of the track's standard configuration, a four-turn short track oval that is 1 mile (1.6 km) long. The track's turns are banked at twenty-four degrees. The front stretch, the location of the finish line, is banked at nine degrees with the backstretch. The racetrack has seats for 135,000 spectators.

Before the race, Greg Biffle led the Drivers' Championship with 453 points, and Matt Kenseth stood in second with 443. Denny Hamlin was third in the Drivers' Championship with 437, two points ahead of Dale Earnhardt Jr. and twenty-two ahead of Jimmie Johnson in fourth and fifth. Martin Truex Jr. with 404 was six points ahead of Kevin Harvick, as Kyle Busch with 391 points, was three ahead of Tony Stewart and nineteen in front of Carl Edwards. In the Manufacturers' Championship, Chevrolet was leading with 81 points, eleven points ahead of Toyota. Ford, with 61 points, was nine points ahead of Dodge in the battle for third. Kenseth was the race's defending champion.

=== Practice and qualifying ===
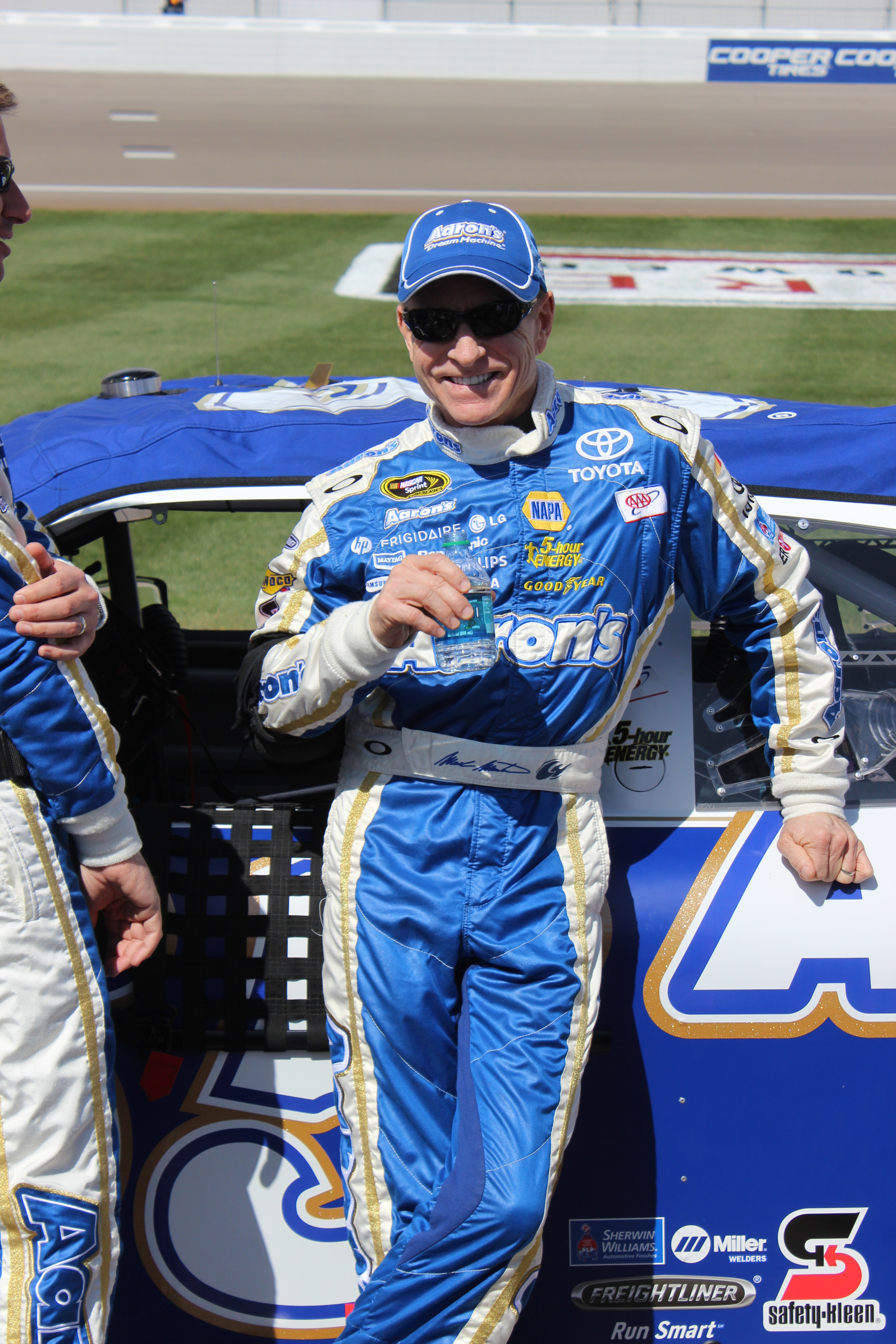
Mark Martin qualified on the pole position for Michael Waltrip Racing.

Two practice sessions were held before the race on June 1, 2012. The first session was 85 minutes long, while the second lasted 90 minutes. Mark Martin was quickest with a time of 22.613 seconds in the first session, 0.039 faster than Hamlin. Truex Jr. was third quickest, followed by Biffle, Kyle Busch, and Biffle. Ryan Newman was seventh, still within two-tenths of a second of Martin's time. In the second and final practice, Aric Almirola was quickest with a time of 22.900 seconds. Jeff Gordon followed in second, ahead of Earnhardt Jr. and Johnson.Scott Speed was fifth quickest, with a time of 23.260 seconds. Jamie McMurray, Michael McDowell, Kurt Busch, Joe Nemechek, and J. J. Yeley rounded out the first ten positions. Martin, who was quickest in the first session, could only manage 29th.

Forty-five cars were entered for qualifying on June 2, 2012, but only forty-three could qualify for the race because of NASCAR's qualifying procedure. Martin of Michael Waltrip Racing clinched the 54th pole position of his Sprint Cup Series career, with a time of 22.742 seconds. He was joined on the front row of the grid by Johnson. Newman qualified third, Clint Bowyer took fourth, and Kenseth started fifth. Harvick, Kyle Busch, Biffle, Kurt Busch and Hamlin rounded out the top ten. The two drivers who failed to qualify for the race were Josh Wise and Cole Whitt.

Once the qualifying session was completed, Martin stated, "I'll never do that again. I anticipated the car being loose, but I didn't ask Rodney if he tightened it up. I knew the conditions were looser than they were in our mock qualifying run, and I didn't want to ask him because I didn't want to be concerned. I knew that I only had to make it one mile without wrecking, and I was going to drive to the limit and slightly beyond, and I felt like I did that. I wouldn't want to do that again. But I couldn't sit on these poles without the fastest race car, and MWR and Rodney Childers in particular and the guys on our team are doing that."

=== Race ===
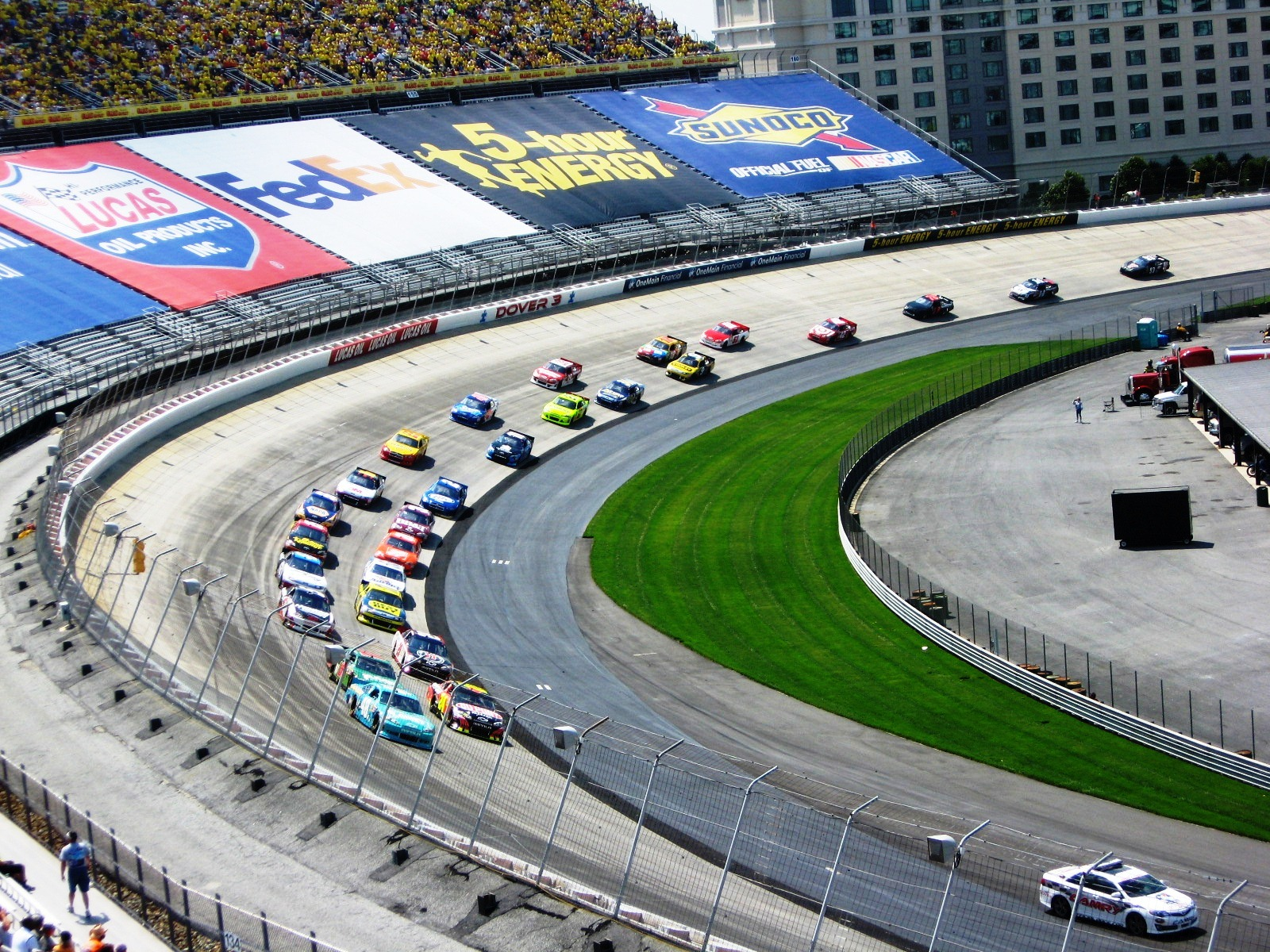
2012 FedEx 400 going under green flag

The race, the thirteenth in the season, began at 1:00 p.m. EDT and was televised live in the United States on Fox. The conditions on the grid were dry before the race, the air temperature at 76 °F (24 °C); mostly clear skies were expected. Dan Schafer, pastor of Calvary Assembly of God in Hightstown, New Jersey, began pre-race ceremonies, by giving the invocation. Next, Kris Allen performed the national anthem, and Delaware Governor Jack Markell gave the command for drivers to start their engines.

Martin retained his pole position lead into the first corner, followed by Johnson, who started second. However, by the end of the first lap, Johnson had become the leader. On the following lap, Bowyer fell to fifth, as Kenseth passed him. On the seventh lap, Martin reclaimed the lead from Johnson. Two laps later, the race was slowed by a caution flag after a large accident involving thirteen drivers occurred on the backstretch, including Tony Stewart, Landon Cassill, Juan Pablo Montoya, Scott Speed, Joe Nemechek, and more. The race was red flagged shortly after the accident. After twenty minutes under the red flag, the race resumed under caution. Most of the front running drivers didn't make a pit stop during the caution, while others who were behind seventeenth pitted. On the lap 13 restart, Martin was the leader ahead of Johnson, as Kenseth passed Newman for the third position. By the eighteenth lap, Martin had expanded his lead to half a second over Johnson. However, Johnson began to catch Martin, and passed him for the first position on lap 30.

On lap 35, Johnson continued to lead over Martin and Kenseth, while Bowyer was placed in fourth. Johnson continued to expand his lead over Martin to over a second by the 43rd lap in the race. Less than ten laps later, Johnson passed Kurt Busch, who started ninth, to place him a lap behind the leaders. On the 56th lap, Gordon overtook Kyle Busch for the fifth position, as Newman fell to tenth after Hamlin and Edwards passed him. Thirteen laps later, David Stremme retired from the race as green flag pit stops began after McMurray, Biffle, Hamlin and Harvick came to pit road. Kenseth and ten other drivers pitted on the following lap, as Martin, Johnson, Bowyer, Earnhardt Jr., and Gordon pitted on the 71st lap. Two laps later, Stewart, who was involved in the accident during the ninth lap, returned to the race after repairs to the car. At lap 75, Kurt Busch was given a drive-through penalty after entering pit road too fast, as Martin reclaimed the lead.

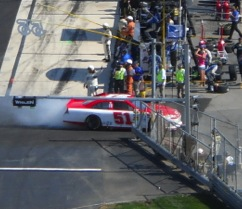
Kurt Busch drives his car to the garage after an engine failure.

Nine laps later, Johnson moved past Martin to take the first position. By the 91st lap, Johnson expanded his lead to one second over Martin. Six laps later, Kenseth moved to the third position while Gordon moved to fourth. On lap 98, Regan Smith returned to the race after repairs to the damage sustained on the ninth lap to his car. Less than five laps later, Stephen Leicht and Reed Sorenson also returned to the race to gain positions and points (Sorenson's team trying to gain breathing room inside the Top 35, while Leicht was trying to get closer), while Johnson maintained a two-second lead over Martin. On the 109th lap, Juan Pablo Montoya returned to the race after sustaining damage to his car after the accident on lap nine. Three laps later, the second caution was given after David Reutimann's engine failed. On the lap 117 restart, Johnson led ahead of Martin, Kenseth, Kyle Busch, and Gordon. On the following lap, Kyle Busch passed Martin for the second position, as Johnson expanded his lead. By lap 132, Harvick had moved into the third position while Martin fell to the fifth position.

On lap 133, Leicht returned to the garage after being over 100 laps off the pace, and Gordon passed Harvick for the third position. Eight laps later, Gordon overtook Kyle Busch to claim the second position behind Johnson. On the 160th lap, Harvick reclaimed the third position from Kyle Busch.

== Results ==
=== Qualifying ===
Grid	No.	Driver	Team	Manufacturer	Time (s)	Speed
1	55	Mark Martin	Michael Waltrip Racing	Toyota	22.742	158.297 mph (254.754 km/h)
2	48	Jimmie Johnson	Hendrick Motorsports	Chevrolet	22.747	158.263 mph (254.700 km/h)
3	39	Ryan Newman	Stewart–Haas Racing	Chevrolet	22.751	158.235 mph (254.655 km/h)
4	15	Clint Bowyer	Michael Waltrip Racing	Toyota	22.778	158.047 mph (254.352 km/h)
5	17	Matt Kenseth	Roush Fenway Racing	Ford	22.787	157.985 mph (254.252 km/h)
6	29	Kevin Harvick	Richard Childress Racing	Chevrolet	22.804	157.867 mph (254.062 km/h)
7	16	Greg Biffle	Roush Fenway Racing	Ford	22.808	157.839 mph (254.017 km/h)
8	18	Kyle Busch	Joe Gibbs Racing	Toyota	22.808	157.839 mph (254.017 km/h)
9	51	Kurt Busch	Phoenix Racing	Chevrolet	22.841	157.611 mph (253.650 km/h)
10	11	Denny Hamlin	Joe Gibbs Racing	Toyota	22.850	157.549 mph (253.551 km/h)
11	20	Joey Logano	Joe Gibbs Racing	Toyota	22.851	157.542 mph (253.539 km/h)
12	43	Aric Almirola	Richard Petty Motorsports	Ford	22.858	157.494 mph (253.462 km/h)
13	5	Kasey Kahne	Hendrick Motorsports	Chevrolet	22.869	157.418 mph (253.340 km/h)
14	24	Jeff Gordon	Hendrick Motorsports	Chevrolet	22.871	157.405 mph (253.319 km/h)
15	31	Jeff Burton	Richard Childress Racing	Chevrolet	22.877	157.363 mph (253.251 km/h)
16	2	Brad Keselowski	Penske Racing	Dodge	22.880	157.343 mph (253.219 km/h)
17	88	Dale Earnhardt Jr.	Hendrick Motorsports	Chevrolet	22.882	157.329 mph (253.196 km/h)
18	56	Martin Truex Jr.	Michael Waltrip Racing	Toyota	22.904	157.178 mph (252.953 km/h)
19	99	Carl Edwards	Roush Fenway Racing	Ford	22.921	157.061 mph (252.765 km/h)
20	27	Paul Menard	Richard Childress Racing	Chevrolet	22.956	156.822 mph (252.381 km/h)
21	9	Marcos Ambrose	Richard Petty Motorsports	Ford	22.956	156.822 mph (252.381 km/h)
22	47	Bobby Labonte	JTG Daugherty Racing	Toyota	22.962	156.781 mph (252.315 km/h)
23	22	A. J. Allmendinger	Penske Racing	Dodge	22.983	156.637 mph (252.083 km/h)
24	1	Jamie McMurray	Earnhardt Ganassi Racing	Chevrolet	22.994	156.563 mph (251.964 km/h)
25	79	Scott Speed	Go Green Racing	Ford	23.005	156.488 mph (251.843 km/h)
26	78	Regan Smith	Furniture Row Racing	Chevrolet	23.009	156.460 mph (251.798 km/h)
27	83	Landon Cassill	BK Racing	Toyota	23.037	156.270 mph (251.492 km/h)
28	34	David Ragan	Front Row Motorsports	Ford	23.045	156.216 mph (251.405 km/h)
29	14	Tony Stewart	Stewart–Haas Racing	Chevrolet	23.059	156.121 mph (251.252 km/h)
30	38	David Gilliland	Front Row Motorsports	Ford	23.118	155.723 mph (250.612 km/h)
31	42	Juan Pablo Montoya	Earnhardt Ganassi Racing	Chevrolet	23.125	155.676 mph (250.536 km/h)
32	30	David Stremme	Inception Motorsports	Toyota	23.186	155.266 mph (249.876 km/h)
33	98	Michael McDowell	Phil Parsons Racing	Ford	23.239	154.912 mph (249.307 km/h)
34	49	J. J. Yeley	Robinson-Blakeney Racing	Toyota	23.275	154.672 mph (248.920 km/h)
35	87	Joe Nemechek	NEMCO Motorsports	Toyota	23.292	154.559 mph (248.739 km/h)
36	19	Mike Bliss	Humphrey Smith Racing	Toyota	23.292	154.559 mph (248.739 km/h)
37	33	Stephen Leicht	Circle Sport Racing	Chevrolet	23.304	154.480 mph (248.611 km/h)
38	32	Reed Sorenson	FAS Lane Racing	Ford	23.362	154.096 mph (247.993 km/h)
39	10	David Reutimann	Tommy Baldwin Racing	Chevrolet	23.373	154.024 mph (247.878 km/h)
40	13	Casey Mears	Germain Racing	Ford	23.397	153.866 mph (247.623 km/h)
41	36	Dave Blaney	Tommy Baldwin Racing	Chevrolet	23.422	153.702 mph (247.359 km/h)
42	93	Travis Kvapil	BK Racing	Toyota	23.440	153.584 mph (247.169 km/h)
43	23	Scott Riggs	R3 Motorsports	Chevrolet	23.304	154.480 mph (248.611 km/h)
Failed to qualify
	26	Josh Wise	Front Row Motorsports	Ford	23.333	154.288 mph (248.302 km/h)
	74	Cole Whitt	Turn One Racing	Chevrolet	23.340	154.242 mph (248.228 km/h)
Source: Stephen Leicht and Scott Riggs had identical qualifying times. Under NASCAR rules, Leicht would be in a higher starting position as his team is higher in owners' points.

=== Race results ===
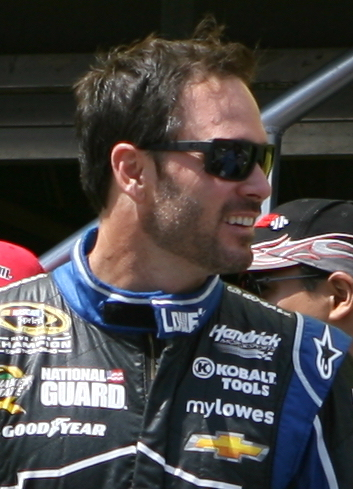
Jimmie Johnson won the race.

Pos	No.	Driver	Team	Manufacturer	Laps	Points
1	48	Jimmie Johnson	Hendrick Motorsports	Chevrolet	400	48
2	29	Kevin Harvick	Richard Childress Racing	Chevrolet	400	42
3	17	Matt Kenseth	Roush Fenway Racing	Ford	400	42
4	88	Dale Earnhardt Jr.	Hendrick Motorsports	Chevrolet	400	41
5	15	Clint Bowyer	Michael Waltrip Racing	Toyota	400	39
6	43	Aric Almirola	Richard Petty Motorsports	Ford	400	38
7	56	Martin Truex Jr.	Michael Waltrip Racing	Toyota	400	37
8	20	Joey Logano	Joe Gibbs Racing	Toyota	400	36
9	5	Kasey Kahne	Hendrick Motorsports	Chevrolet	400	35
10	9	Marcos Ambrose	Richard Petty Motorsports	Ford	400	34
11	16	Greg Biffle	Roush Fenway Racing	Ford	400	33
12	2	Brad Keselowski	Penske Racing	Dodge	400	32
13	24	Jeff Gordon	Hendrick Motorsports	Chevrolet	400	32
14	55	Mark Martin	Michael Waltrip Racing	Toyota	400	31
15	39	Ryan Newman	Stewart–Haas Racing	Chevrolet	400	29
16	22	A. J. Allmendinger	Penske Racing	Dodge	400	28
17	27	Paul Menard	Richard Childress Racing	Chevrolet	400	27
18	11	Denny Hamlin	Joe Gibbs Racing	Toyota	400	27
19	1	Jamie McMurray	Earnhardt Ganassi Racing	Chevrolet	400	25
20	47	Bobby Labonte	JTG Daugherty Racing	Toyota	399	24
21	34	David Ragan	Front Row Motorsports	Ford	398	24
22	31	Jeff Burton	Richard Childress Racing	Chevrolet	364	22
23	93	Travis Kvapil	BK Racing	Toyota	348	21
24	51	Kurt Busch	Phoenix Racing	Chevrolet	338	20
25	14	Tony Stewart	Stewart–Haas Racing	Chevrolet	331	19
26	99	Carl Edwards	Roush Fenway Racing	Ford	318	18
27	78	Regan Smith	Furniture Row Racing	Chevrolet	306	17
28	42	Juan Pablo Montoya	Earnhardt Ganassi Racing	Chevrolet	296	16
29	18	Kyle Busch	Joe Gibbs Racing	Toyota	202	15
30	32	Reed Sorenson	FAS Lane Racing	Ford	124	0
31	10	David Reutimann	Tommy Baldwin Racing	Chevrolet	110	13
32	36	Dave Blaney	Tommy Baldwin Racing	Chevrolet	65	12
33	30	David Stremme	Inception Motorsports	Toyota	63	11
34	49	J. J. Yeley	Robinson-Blakeney Racing	Toyota	41	10
35	33	Stephen Leicht	Circle Sport Racing	Chevrolet	29	9
36	19	Mike Bliss	Humphrey Smith Racing	Toyota	23	0
37	23	Scott Riggs	R3 Motorsports	Chevrolet	21	7
38	83	Landon Cassill	BK Racing	Toyota	9	6
39	87	Joe Nemechek	NEMCO Motorsports	Toyota	9	0
40	38	David Gilliland	Front Row Motorsports	Ford	9	4
41	13	Casey Mears	Germain Racing	Ford	8	3
42	98	Michael McDowell	Phil Parsons Racing	Ford	8	2
43	79	Scott Speed	Go Green Racing	Ford	8	1

== Standings after the race ==
Drivers' Championship standings

Pos	Driver	Points
1	Greg Biffle	486
2	Matt Kenseth	485
3	Dale Earnhardt Jr.	476
4	Denny Hamlin	464
5	Jimmie Johnson	453

Manufacturers' Championship standings

Pos	Manufacturer	Points
1	Chevrolet	90
2	Toyota	74
3	Ford	67
4	Dodge	55

- Note: Only the top five positions are included for the driver standings.

Previous race: 2012 Coca-Cola 600	Sprint Cup Series; 2012 season	Next race: 2012 Pocono 400
