= 2017 Brickyard 400 =

Auto race held at Indianapolis in 2017

2017 Brantley Gilbert Big Machine Brickyard 400
Race details
- Race 20 of 36 in the 2017 Monster Energy NASCAR Cup Series
- The 2017 Brickyard 400 program cover.
- Date: July 23, 2017
- Location: Indianapolis Motor Speedway in Speedway, Indiana
- Course: Permanent racing facility
- Course length: 2.5 miles (4.023 km)
- Distance: 167 laps, 417.5 mi (671.901 km)
- Scheduled distance: 160 laps, 400 mi (643.738 km)
- Average speed: 114.384 miles per hour (184.083 km/h)

Pole position
Driver	Kyle Busch	Joe Gibbs Racing
- Time: 48.051

Most laps led
Driver	Kyle Busch	Joe Gibbs Racing
- Laps: 87

Winner
No. 5	Kasey Kahne	Hendrick Motorsports

Television in the United States
- Network: NBC
- Announcers: Rick Allen, Jeff Burton and Steve Letarte

Radio in the United States
- Radio: IndyCar Radio Network
- Booth announcers: Doug Rice, Pat Patterson and Jeff Hammond
- Turn announcers: Mark Jaynes (1), Nick Yeoman (2), Jake Query (3) and Chris Denari (4)

The 2017 Brickyard 400 (branded as the Brantley Gilbert Big Machine Brickyard 400 for sponsorship reasons) was a Monster Energy NASCAR Cup Series race held on July 23, 2017, at Indianapolis Motor Speedway in Speedway, Indiana. The 24th running of the Brickyard 400, it was contested over 167 laps – extended from 160 laps due to an overtime finish – on the 2.5-mile (4.0-kilometre) speedway, and was the 20th race of the 2017 Monster Energy NASCAR Cup Series season.

Hendrick Motorsports driver Kasey Kahne took his first Cup Series victory since 2014, and his 18th win overall.

== Entry list ==
No.	Driver	Team	Manufacturer
1	Jamie McMurray (W)	Chip Ganassi Racing	Chevrolet
2	Brad Keselowski	Team Penske	Ford
3	Austin Dillon	Richard Childress Racing	Chevrolet
4	Kevin Harvick (W)	Stewart–Haas Racing	Ford
5	Kasey Kahne	Hendrick Motorsports	Chevrolet
6	Trevor Bayne	Roush Fenway Racing	Ford
7	J. J. Yeley (i)	Tommy Baldwin Racing	Chevrolet
10	Danica Patrick	Stewart–Haas Racing	Ford
11	Denny Hamlin	Joe Gibbs Racing	Toyota
13	Ty Dillon (R)	Germain Racing	Chevrolet
14	Clint Bowyer	Stewart–Haas Racing	Ford
15	Joey Gase (i)	Premium Motorsports	Chevrolet
17	Ricky Stenhouse Jr.	Roush Fenway Racing	Ford
18	Kyle Busch (W)	Joe Gibbs Racing	Toyota
19	Daniel Suárez (R)	Joe Gibbs Racing	Toyota
20	Matt Kenseth	Joe Gibbs Racing	Toyota
21	Ryan Blaney	Wood Brothers Racing	Ford
22	Joey Logano	Team Penske	Ford
23	Corey LaJoie (R)	BK Racing	Toyota
24	Chase Elliott	Hendrick Motorsports	Chevrolet
27	Paul Menard (W)	Richard Childress Racing	Chevrolet
31	Ryan Newman (W)	Richard Childress Racing	Chevrolet
32	Matt DiBenedetto	Go Fas Racing	Ford
33	Jeffrey Earnhardt	Circle Sport – The Motorsports Group	Chevrolet
34	Landon Cassill	Front Row Motorsports	Ford
37	Chris Buescher	JTG Daugherty Racing	Chevrolet
38	David Ragan	Front Row Motorsports	Ford
41	Kurt Busch	Stewart–Haas Racing	Ford
42	Kyle Larson	Chip Ganassi Racing	Chevrolet
43	Aric Almirola	Richard Petty Motorsports	Ford
47	A. J. Allmendinger	JTG Daugherty Racing	Chevrolet
48	Jimmie Johnson (W)	Hendrick Motorsports	Chevrolet
51	B. J. McLeod (i)	Rick Ware Racing	Chevrolet
55	Gray Gaulding (R)	Premium Motorsports	Chevrolet
66	Timmy Hill (i)	MBM Motorsports	Chevrolet
72	Cole Whitt	TriStar Motorsports	Chevrolet
77	Erik Jones (R)	Furniture Row Racing	Toyota
78	Martin Truex Jr.	Furniture Row Racing	Toyota
88	Dale Earnhardt Jr.	Hendrick Motorsports	Chevrolet
95	Michael McDowell	Leavine Family Racing	Chevrolet
Official entry list

== Practice ==
=== First practice ===
Denny Hamlin was the fastest in the first practice session with a time of 48.022 seconds and a speed of 187.414 mph (301.614 km/h).

Pos	No.	Driver	Team	Manufacturer	Time	Speed
1	11	Denny Hamlin	Joe Gibbs Racing	Toyota	48.022	187.414
2	78	Martin Truex Jr.	Furniture Row Racing	Toyota	48.502	185.559
3	20	Matt Kenseth	Joe Gibbs Racing	Toyota	48.596	185.200
Official first practice results

=== Final practice ===
Erik Jones was the fastest in the final practice session with a time of 48.425 seconds and a speed of 185.854 mph (299.103 km/h).

Pos	No.	Driver	Team	Manufacturer	Time	Speed
1	77	Erik Jones (R)	Furniture Row Racing	Toyota	48.425	185.854
2	4	Kevin Harvick	Stewart–Haas Racing	Ford	48.433	185.824
3	21	Ryan Blaney	Wood Brothers Racing	Ford	48.435	185.816
Official final practice results

== Qualifying ==
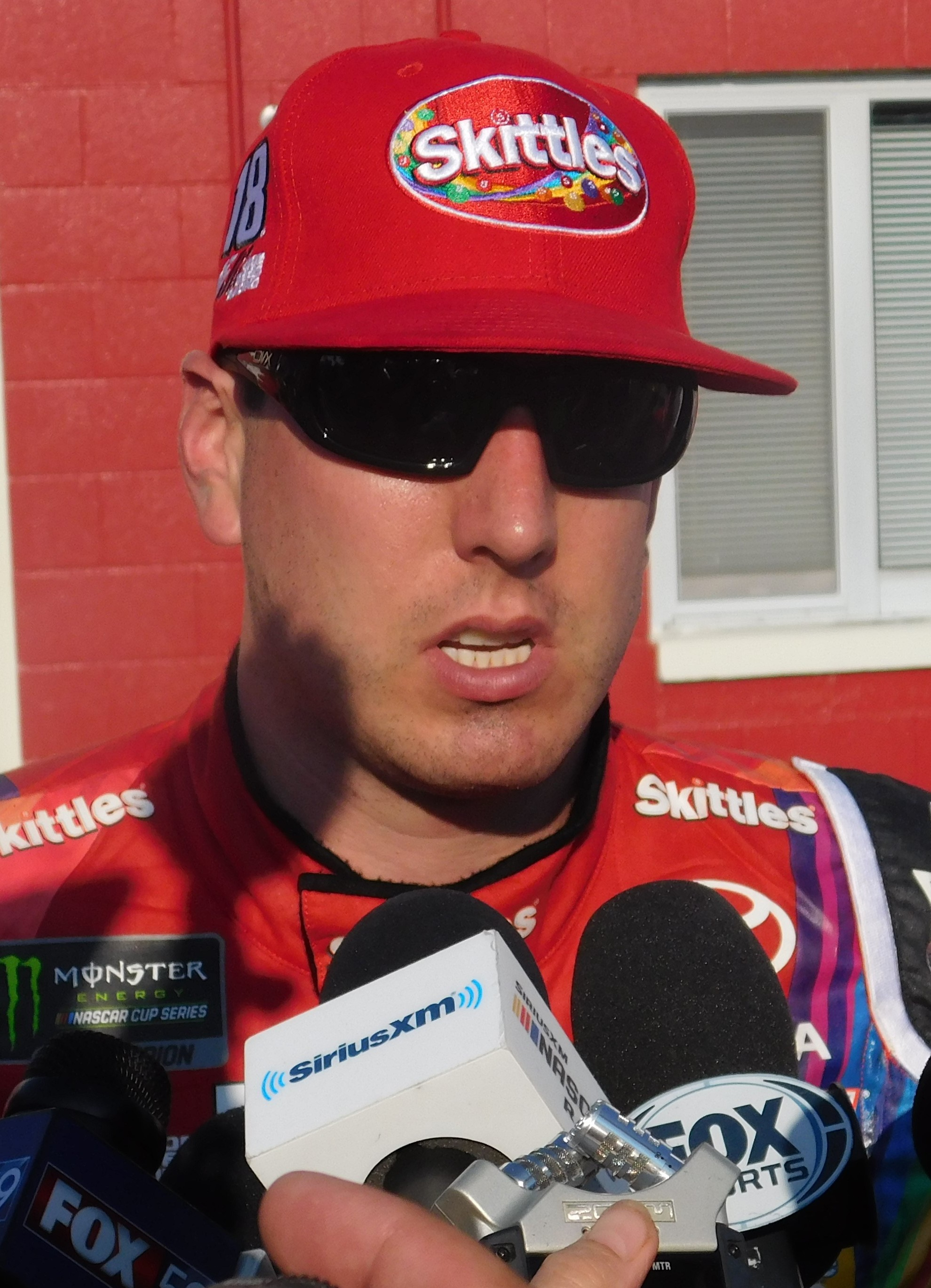
Kyle Busch scored the pole position.

Kyle Busch scored the pole for the race with a time of 48.051 and a speed of 187.301 mph (301.432 km/h).

=== Qualifying results ===
Pos	No.	Driver	Team	Manufacturer	R1	R2	R3
1	18	Kyle Busch	Joe Gibbs Racing	Toyota	48.192	48.216	48.051
2	4	Kevin Harvick	Stewart–Haas Racing	Ford	48.235	48.357	48.301
3	1	Jamie McMurray	Chip Ganassi Racing	Chevrolet	48.027	48.462	48.316
4	48	Jimmie Johnson	Hendrick Motorsports	Chevrolet	48.230	48.538	48.426
5	11	Denny Hamlin	Joe Gibbs Racing	Toyota	48.552	48.303	48.434
6	78	Martin Truex Jr.	Furniture Row Racing	Toyota	48.760	48.372	48.456
7	22	Joey Logano	Team Penske	Ford	48.316	48.412	48.461
8	31	Ryan Newman	Richard Childress Racing	Chevrolet	48.330	48.696	48.611
9	77	Erik Jones (R)	Furniture Row Racing	Toyota	48.395	48.514	48.677
10	21	Ryan Blaney	Wood Brothers Racing	Ford	48.404	48.739	48.750
11	2	Brad Keselowski	Team Penske	Ford	48.317	48.686	48.845
12	41	Kurt Busch	Stewart–Haas Racing	Ford	48.595	48.733	48.871
13	88	Dale Earnhardt Jr.	Hendrick Motorsports	Chevrolet	48.233	48.760	—
14	20	Matt Kenseth	Joe Gibbs Racing	Toyota	48.678	48.789	—
15	19	Daniel Suárez (R)	Joe Gibbs Racing	Toyota	48.743	48.793	—
16	24	Chase Elliott	Hendrick Motorsports	Chevrolet	48.481	48.844	—
17	27	Paul Menard	Richard Childress Racing	Chevrolet	48.768	48.991	—
18	14	Clint Bowyer	Stewart–Haas Racing	Ford	48.781	49.020	—
19	5	Kasey Kahne	Hendrick Motorsports	Chevrolet	48.949	49.036	—
20	3	Austin Dillon	Richard Childress Racing	Chevrolet	48.713	49.099	—
21	17	Ricky Stenhouse Jr.	Roush Fenway Racing	Ford	48.794	49.104	—
22	6	Trevor Bayne	Roush Fenway Racing	Ford	48.504	49.136	—
23	10	Danica Patrick	Stewart–Haas Racing	Ford	48.866	49.489	—
24	95	Michael McDowell	Leavine Family Racing	Chevrolet	48.912	49.500	—
25	42	Kyle Larson	Chip Ganassi Racing	Chevrolet	49.072	—	—
26	37	Chris Buescher	JTG Daugherty Racing	Chevrolet	49.102	—	—
27	32	Matt DiBenedetto	Go Fas Racing	Ford	49.313	—	—
28	13	Ty Dillon (R)	Germain Racing	Chevrolet	49.343	—	—
29	43	Aric Almirola	Richard Petty Motorsports	Ford	49.427	—	—
30	38	David Ragan	Front Row Motorsports	Ford	49.674	—	—
31	34	Landon Cassill	Front Row Motorsports	Ford	49.755	—	—
32	23	Corey LaJoie (R)	BK Racing	Toyota	50.166	—	—
33	7	J. J. Yeley (i)	Tommy Baldwin Racing	Chevrolet	50.421	—	—
34	72	Cole Whitt	TriStar Motorsports	Chevrolet	50.620	—	—
35	51	B. J. McLeod (i)	Rick Ware Racing	Chevrolet	51.051	—	—
36	55	Gray Gaulding (R)	Premium Motorsports	Chevrolet	51.178	—	—
37	33	Jeffrey Earnhardt	Circle Sport – The Motorsports Group	Chevrolet	51.398	—	—
38	66	Timmy Hill (i)	MBM Motorsports	Chevrolet	51.747	—	—
39	15	Joey Gase (i)	Premium Motorsports	Chevrolet	55.336	—	—
40	47	A. J. Allmendinger	JTG Daugherty Racing	Chevrolet	0.000	—	—
Official qualifying results

== Race ==
=== First stage ===
Kyle Busch led the field to the green flag at 2:46pm. The first caution of the race flew when Corey LaJoie spun out and hit the wall in Turn 3. Minutes later, the race was red-flagged due to lightning in the area, as well as a downpour, that lasted 1 hour and 47 minutes.

Race was restarted at 4:48pm and went green on lap 18, and the second caution flew on lap 31 for a scheduled competition caution. During that 13-lap run, Chase Elliott retired from the race with a failed engine.

The race restarted on lap 35, it went green the remainder of the first stage, which was won by Busch at the end of lap 50. The third caution of the race flew to conclude stage one.

=== Second stage ===
The race restarted on lap 56, and a caution flew two laps later for a three-car wreck in Turn 1. It started when J. J. Yeley spun exiting Turn 1. David Ragan spun exiting Turn 1, veered down the track and slammed the inside wall. Jeffrey Earnhardt was also collected.

The race restarted on lap 64, only for debris from Yeley's car to bring out the fifth caution of the race, on lap 72. Erik Jones took the lead when Busch committed to pit road.

The race restarted on lap 76, Dale Earnhardt Jr. and Trevor Bayne made contact, and Earnhardt's car suffered radiator damage that resulted in the sixth caution of the race one lap later.

The race restarted on lap 80, Ryan Blaney took the lead from Jones going into Turn 1. Busch retook the lead on Lap 87 and won the second stage. That would bring out the seventh caution to conclude the stage. Martin Truex Jr. exited pit road with the race lead.

=== Final stage ===
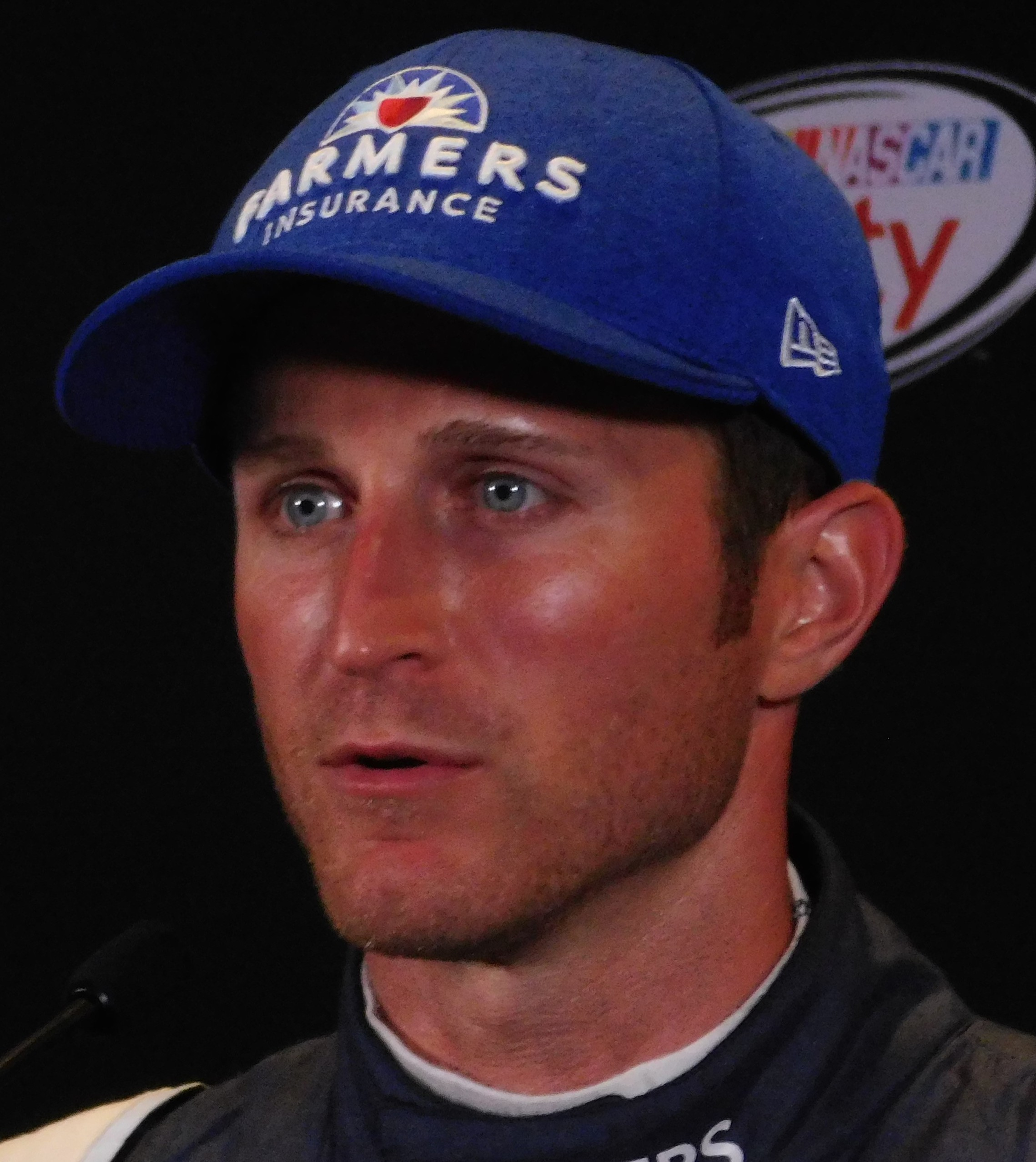
Kasey Kahne won the race.

The final stage began under green on lap 106. Ricky Stenhouse Jr. and Jimmie Johnson made contact exiting Turn 2 two laps later, sending Stenhouse down the track and into the inside wall, therefore bringing out an eighth caution.

The race restarted under green on lap 111, Truex got loose going into Turn 1, got into the left-rear corner of Busch, sending him spinning into the wall, therefore bringing out the ninth caution of the race. Truex got swept around by side force and slammed the wall, and his car caught fire. Both cars were out of the race, denying Kyle Busch's shot at a third consecutive victory at the Brickyard 400. This incident handed the race lead to Matt Kenseth.

The race restarted under green with 40 laps to go. Drivers started hitting pit road to make their final stop of the race with 31 to go. Kenseth pitted from the lead with 28 to go and Jones pitted the next lap, handing the lead to Brad Keselowski.

In the closing laps, the first three cars, Keselowski, Johnson and Kasey Kahne, chose to gamble on fuel, but probably couldn't make it to the finish on fuel if there were no more cautions. Fourth place Trevor Bayne was the highest placed car with enough fuel to make it to the end. This all went out the window with 11 to go when Clint Bowyer got loose and spun down the track, with help from Jones, slammed the inside wall and ricocheted back onto the racing surface into the path of Kurt Busch, who t-boned him, slammed the wall and came to a halt down the track, the tenth caution of the race flew for a multi-car wreck, Kahne pitted from third just as the wreck happened, which proved crucial for him as he inherited the lead. The race was red-flagged for the second time to ensue cleanup on the track, It was lifted after 20 minutes and 20 seconds.

Kahne held off Keselowski's charge into Turn 1 on the restart when the race went back to green with seven laps to go. When the field came back down the front stretch, Kyle Larson slammed the outside wall, bringing out the 11th caution.

The race restarted with two laps to go, Kahne and Keselowski raced side-by-side from the start/finish line through Turn 3. Heading down the backstretch, Johnson, with smoke billowing from his left-rear tire, got to the inside of the two to battle for the lead going into Turn 3, setting up the 12th caution of the race; rounding the turn, Johnson spun out and hit the outside wall, sending the race into overtime.

==== Overtime ====
===== First attempt =====
On the first attempt, the field did not make it to the start/finish line before all the pushing and shoving caused a multi-car wreck, bringing out the 13th caution. Keselowski was ahead of Kahne when the caution flew and assumed the lead; the red flag was displayed for the third time to again ensue cleanup of the track, and was lifted after 24 minutes and 16 seconds.

===== Second attempt =====
At 8:53 PM, the second attempt at finishing the race began. Kahne got the advantage, jumped past Keselowski going into Turn 1 and set sail. Exiting Turn 2, Denny Hamlin suffered a left-rear tire failure and spun towards the outside wall, getting clipped by Paul Menard in the process. Despite this wreck happening well before Kahne, the race leader, reached the pre-determined mark on the backstretch that designated an official restart under NASCAR's green–white–checkered finish rule that allowed NASCAR to end the race under caution, officials waited until he passed the line, then threw the caution to end the race. This ended the race and secured victory for Kahne.

Controversy came as a result of this finish, primarily over darkness issues and that Indianapolis Motor Speedway does not have lights. Due to the rain delay early in the race, and numerous cautions in the final stage, including two red flags, it was 8:54 PM, with official sunset at 9:05 PM. Some drivers asked if safety vehicles could turn on their headlights before the final restart, but this was denied. Furthermore, after the incident, NASCAR found oil as a result of the incident, and questions arose if the track could have been cleaned up in time or the race would have been stopped for darkness with less than ten minutes of daylight available.

NASCAR subsequently made a rule change eliminating the overtime line, and reverting to the green–white–checkered rule from 2010 to 2015, albeit with one change – eliminating the maximum number of attempts. In 2024, a rule change regarding darkness or logistics was made where a time-certain finish time can be set by race control.

== Race results ==
=== Stage results ===
Stage 1 Laps: 50

Pos	No	Driver	Team	Manufacturer	Points
1	18	Kyle Busch	Joe Gibbs Racing	Toyota	10
2	78	Martin Truex Jr.	Furniture Row Racing	Toyota	9
3	21	Ryan Blaney	Wood Brothers Racing	Ford	8
4	4	Kevin Harvick	Stewart–Haas Racing	Ford	7
5	22	Joey Logano	Team Penske	Ford	6
6	20	Matt Kenseth	Joe Gibbs Racing	Toyota	5
7	1	Jamie McMurray	Chip Ganassi Racing	Chevrolet	4
8	42	Kyle Larson	Chip Ganassi Racing	Chevrolet	3
9	48	Jimmie Johnson	Hendrick Motorsports	Chevrolet	2
10	88	Dale Earnhardt Jr.	Hendrick Motorsports	Chevrolet	1
Official stage one results

Stage 2 Laps: 50

Pos	No	Driver	Team	Manufacturer	Points
1	18	Kyle Busch	Joe Gibbs Racing	Toyota	10
2	78	Martin Truex Jr.	Furniture Row Racing	Toyota	9
3	21	Ryan Blaney	Wood Brothers Racing	Ford	8
4	77	Erik Jones (R)	Furniture Row Racing	Toyota	7
5	4	Kevin Harvick	Stewart–Haas Racing	Ford	6
6	20	Matt Kenseth	Joe Gibbs Racing	Toyota	5
7	22	Joey Logano	Team Penske	Ford	4
8	11	Denny Hamlin	Joe Gibbs Racing	Toyota	3
9	2	Brad Keselowski	Team Penske	Ford	2
10	1	Jamie McMurray	Chip Ganassi Racing	Chevrolet	1
Official stage two results

=== Final stage results ===
Stage 3 Laps: 67

Pos	Grid	No	Driver	Team	Manufacturer	Laps	Points
1	19	5	Kasey Kahne	Hendrick Motorsports	Chevrolet	167	40
2	11	2	Brad Keselowski	Team Penske	Ford	167	37
3	8	31	Ryan Newman	Richard Childress Racing	Chevrolet	167	34
4	7	22	Joey Logano	Team Penske	Ford	167	43
5	14	20	Matt Kenseth	Joe Gibbs Racing	Toyota	167	42
6	2	4	Kevin Harvick	Stewart–Haas Racing	Ford	167	44
7	15	19	Daniel Suárez (R)	Joe Gibbs Racing	Toyota	167	30
8	27	32	Matt DiBenedetto	Go Fas Racing	Ford	167	29
9	26	37	Chris Buescher	JTG Daugherty Racing	Chevrolet	167	28
10	39	47	A. J. Allmendinger	JTG Daugherty Racing	Chevrolet	167	27
11	23	10	Danica Patrick	Stewart–Haas Racing	Ford	167	26
12	34	72	Cole Whitt	TriStar Motorsports	Chevrolet	167	25
13	29	43	Aric Almirola	Richard Petty Motorsports	Ford	167	24
14	37	66	Timmy Hill (i)	MBM Motorsports	Chevrolet	167	0
15	3	1	Jamie McMurray	Chip Ganassi Racing	Chevrolet	167	27
16	17	27	Paul Menard	Richard Childress Racing	Chevrolet	167	21
17	5	11	Denny Hamlin	Joe Gibbs Racing	Toyota	166	23
18	24	95	Michael McDowell	Leavine Family Racing	Chevrolet	166	19
19	28	13	Ty Dillon (R)	Germain Racing	Chevrolet	165	18
20	22	6	Trevor Bayne	Roush Fenway Racing	Ford	162	17
21	20	3	Austin Dillon	Richard Childress Racing	Chevrolet	162	16
22	31	34	Landon Cassill	Front Row Motorsports	Ford	162	15
23	10	21	Ryan Blaney	Wood Brothers Racing	Ford	162	30
24	35	55	Gray Gaulding (R)	Premium Motorsports	Chevrolet	162	13
25	38	15	Joey Gase (i)	Premium Motorsports	Chevrolet	162	0
26	36	33	Jeffrey Earnhardt	Circle Sport – The Motorsports Group	Chevrolet	162	11
27	4	48	Jimmie Johnson	Hendrick Motorsports	Chevrolet	158	12
28	25	42	Kyle Larson	Chip Ganassi Racing	Chevrolet	154	12
29	12	41	Kurt Busch	Stewart–Haas Racing	Ford	149	8
30	18	14	Clint Bowyer	Stewart–Haas Racing	Ford	148	7
31	9	77	Erik Jones (R)	Furniture Row Racing	Toyota	148	13
32	40	51	B. J. McLeod (i)	Rick Ware Racing	Chevrolet	135	0
33	6	78	Martin Truex Jr.	Furniture Row Racing	Toyota	110	22
34	1	18	Kyle Busch	Joe Gibbs Racing	Toyota	110	23
35	21	17	Ricky Stenhouse Jr.	Roush Fenway Racing	Ford	106	2
36	13	88	Dale Earnhardt Jr.	Hendrick Motorsports	Chevrolet	76	2
37	33	7	J. J. Yeley (i)	Tommy Baldwin Racing	Chevrolet	70	0
38	30	38	David Ragan	Front Row Motorsports	Ford	56	1
39	16	24	Chase Elliott	Hendrick Motorsports	Chevrolet	43	1
40	32	23	Corey LaJoie (R)	BK Racing	Toyota	9	1
Official race results

=== Race statistics ===
- Lead changes: 10 among 7 different drivers
- Cautions/Laps: 14 for 55 laps
- Red flags: 3 for 2 hours, 31 minutes and 39 seconds
- Time of race: 3 hours, 39 minutes
- Average speed: 114.384 miles per hour (184.083 km/h)

== Media ==
=== Television ===
NBC Sports covered the race on the television side. Rick Allen, Jeff Burton and Steve Letarte called the race from the broadcast booth, while Dave Burns, Parker Kligerman, Marty Snider and Kelli Stavast reported from pit lane.

NBC
Booth announcers	Pit reporters
Lap-by-lap: Rick Allen; Color commentator: Jeff Burton; Color commentator: Steve Letarte	Dave Burns; Parker Kligerman; Marty Snider; Kelli Stavast

=== Radio ===
Indianapolis Motor Speedway Radio Network and the Performance Racing Network jointly co-produced the radio broadcast for the race, which was simulcast on SiriusXM's NASCAR Radio channel, and aired on IMS or PRN stations, depending on contractual obligations. The lead announcers and two pit reporters were PRN staff, while the turns and two pit reporters were from IMS.

PRN/IMS Radio
Booth announcers	Turn announcers	Pit reporters
Lead announcer: Doug Rice; Announcer: Pat Patterson; Announcer: Jeff Hammond	Turn 1: Mark Jaynes; Turn 2: Nick Yeoman; Turn 3: Jake Query; Turn 4: Chris Denari	Brad Gillie; Brett McMillan; Kevin Lee; Michael Young

== Standings after the race ==
Drivers' Championship standings

	Pos	Driver	Points
	1	Martin Truex Jr.	780
	2	Kyle Larson	732 (–48)
1	3	Kevin Harvick	683 (–97)
1	4	Kyle Busch	673 (–107)
	5	Denny Hamlin	612 (–168)
2	6	Brad Keselowski	601 (–179)
	7	Jamie McMurray	599 (–181)
2	8	Chase Elliott	588 (–192)
2	9	Matt Kenseth	566 (–214)
1	10	Jimmie Johnson	564 (–216)
1	11	Clint Bowyer	533 (–247)
	12	Ryan Blaney	516 (–264)
	13	Joey Logano	515 (–265)
	14	Kurt Busch	463 (–317)
1	15	Ryan Newman	462 (–318)
1	16	Ricky Stenhouse Jr.	443 (–337)
Official driver's standings

Manufacturers' Championship standings

Pos	Manufacturer	Points
1	Chevrolet	720
2	Ford	709 (–11)
3	Toyota	684 (–36)
Official manufacturers' standings

- Note: Only the first 16 positions are included for the driver standings.
- . – Driver has clinched a position in the Monster Energy NASCAR Cup Series playoffs.

Previous race: 2017 Overton's 301	Monster Energy NASCAR Cup Series; 2017 season	Next race: 2017 Overton's 400
