= 2017 Overton's 301 =

Race details
- Race 19 of 36 in the 2017 Monster Energy NASCAR Cup Series
- The 2017 Overton's 301 program cover, featuring Chase Elliott and Kyle Larson. "The Future Is Bright".
- Date: July 16, 2017
- Location: New Hampshire Motor Speedway in Loudon, New Hampshire
- Course: Permanent racing facility
- Course length: 1.058 miles (1.703 km)
- Distance: 301 laps, 318.458 mi (512.603 km)
- Average speed: 105.800 miles per hour (170.269 km/h)

Pole position
| Driver | Martin Truex Jr. | Furniture Row Racing |
- Time: 28.621

Most laps led
| Driver | Martin Truex Jr. | Furniture Row Racing |
- Laps: 137

Winner
| No. 11 | Denny Hamlin | Joe Gibbs Racing |

Television in the United States
- Network: NBCSN
- Announcers: Rick Allen, Jeff Burton and Steve Letarte
- Nielsen ratings: 1.9/3 (Final); 3.2 million viewers

Radio in the United States
- Radio: PRN
- Booth announcers: Doug Rice, Mark Garrow and Wendy Venturini
- Turn announcers: Rob Albright (1 & 2) and Pat Patterson (3 & 4)

The 2017 Overton's 301 was a Monster Energy NASCAR Cup Series race held on July 16, 2017 at New Hampshire Motor Speedway in Loudon, New Hampshire. Contested over 301 laps on the 1.058-mile (1.703 km) speedway, it was the 19th race of the 2017 Monster Energy NASCAR Cup Series season, this was also Aric Almirola's first race back in the 43 after his injury at Kansas 8 weeks either.

== Entry list ==
| No. | Driver | Team | Manufacturer |
|---|---|---|---|
| 1 | Jamie McMurray | Chip Ganassi Racing | Chevrolet |
| 2 | Brad Keselowski | Team Penske | Ford |
| 3 | Austin Dillon | Richard Childress Racing | Chevrolet |
| 4 | Kevin Harvick | Stewart–Haas Racing | Ford |
| 5 | Kasey Kahne | Hendrick Motorsports | Chevrolet |
| 6 | Trevor Bayne | Roush Fenway Racing | Ford |
| 10 | Danica Patrick | Stewart–Haas Racing | Ford |
| 11 | Denny Hamlin | Joe Gibbs Racing | Toyota |
| 13 | Ty Dillon (R) | Germain Racing | Chevrolet |
| 14 | Clint Bowyer | Stewart–Haas Racing | Ford |
| 15 | Reed Sorenson | Premium Motorsports | Chevrolet |
| 17 | Ricky Stenhouse Jr. | Roush Fenway Racing | Ford |
| 18 | Kyle Busch | Joe Gibbs Racing | Toyota |
| 19 | Daniel Suárez (R) | Joe Gibbs Racing | Toyota |
| 20 | Matt Kenseth | Joe Gibbs Racing | Toyota |
| 21 | Ryan Blaney | Wood Brothers Racing | Ford |
| 22 | Joey Logano | Team Penske | Ford |
| 23 | Corey LaJoie (R) | BK Racing | Toyota |
| 24 | Chase Elliott | Hendrick Motorsports | Chevrolet |
| 27 | Paul Menard | Richard Childress Racing | Chevrolet |
| 31 | Ryan Newman | Richard Childress Racing | Chevrolet |
| 32 | Matt DiBenedetto | Go Fas Racing | Ford |
| 33 | Jeffrey Earnhardt | Circle Sport – The Motorsports Group | Chevrolet |
| 34 | Landon Cassill | Front Row Motorsports | Ford |
| 37 | Chris Buescher | JTG Daugherty Racing | Chevrolet |
| 38 | David Ragan | Front Row Motorsports | Ford |
| 41 | Kurt Busch | Stewart–Haas Racing | Ford |
| 42 | Kyle Larson | Chip Ganassi Racing | Chevrolet |
| 43 | Aric Almirola | Richard Petty Motorsports | Ford |
| 47 | A. J. Allmendinger | JTG Daugherty Racing | Chevrolet |
| 48 | Jimmie Johnson | Hendrick Motorsports | Chevrolet |
| 51 | Josh Bilicki (i) | Rick Ware Racing | Chevrolet |
| 55 | Gray Gaulding (R) | Premium Motorsports | Toyota |
| 72 | Cole Whitt | TriStar Motorsports | Chevrolet |
| 77 | Erik Jones (R) | Furniture Row Racing | Toyota |
| 78 | Martin Truex Jr. | Furniture Row Racing | Toyota |
| 83 | Ryan Sieg (i) | BK Racing | Toyota |
| 88 | Dale Earnhardt Jr. | Hendrick Motorsports | Chevrolet |
| 95 | Michael McDowell | Leavine Family Racing | Chevrolet |
Official entry list

== First practice ==
Kyle Larson recorded the fastest time in the first practice session with a time of 28.430 seconds and a speed of 133.971 mph (215.605 km/h).

| Pos | No. | Driver | Team | Manufacturer | Time | Speed |
|---|---|---|---|---|---|---|
| 1 | 42 | Kyle Larson | Chip Ganassi Racing | Chevrolet | 28.430 | 133.971 |
| 2 | 78 | Martin Truex Jr. | Furniture Row Racing | Toyota | 28.591 | 133.217 |
| 3 | 18 | Kyle Busch | Joe Gibbs Racing | Toyota | 28.607 | 133.142 |
Official first practice results

== Qualifying ==
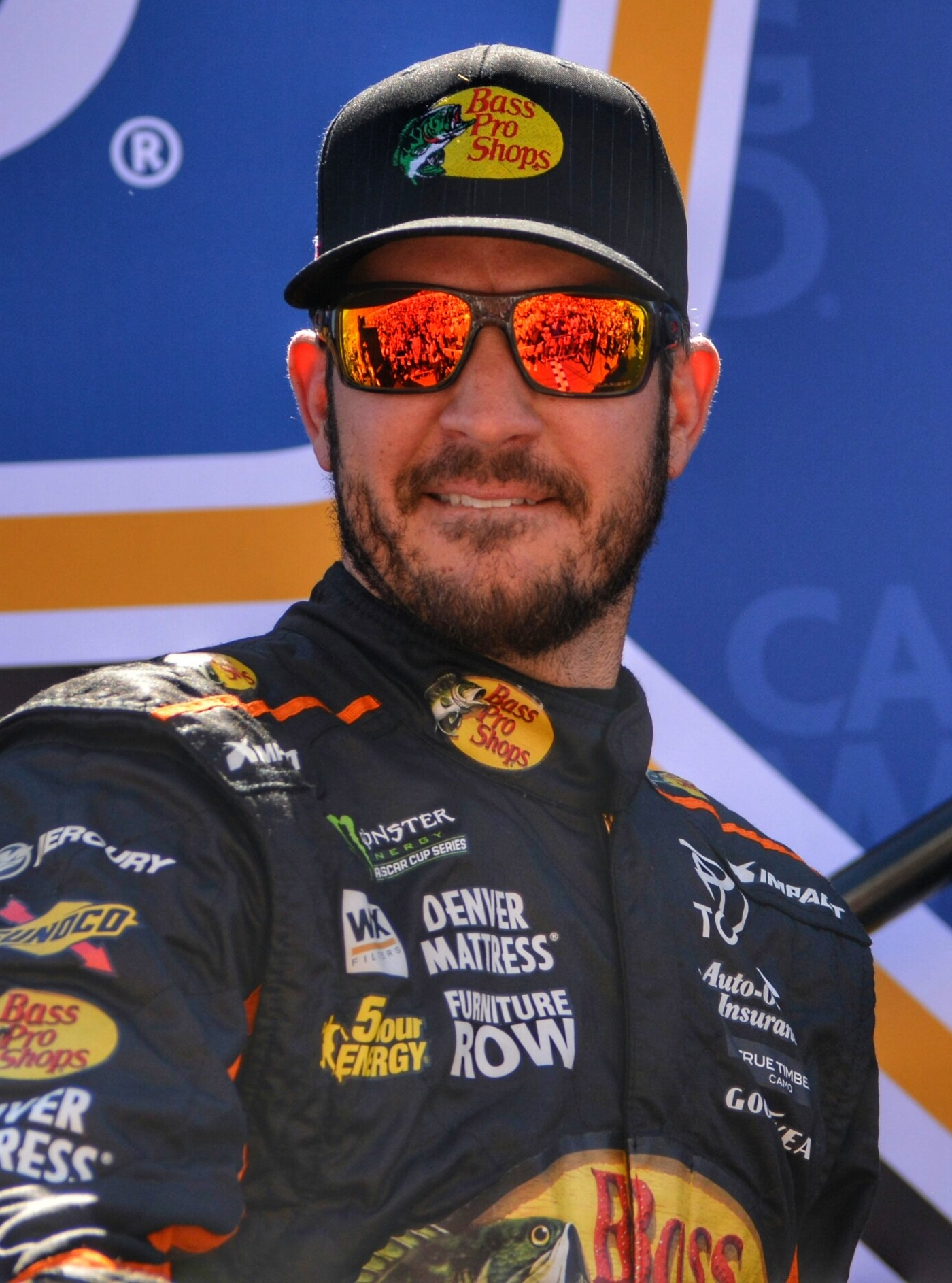
Martin Truex Jr. scored the pole position.

Martin Truex Jr. scored the pole for the race with a time of 28.621 and a speed of 133.077 mph (214.167 km/h) after Kyle Larson was disqualified after failing post-qualifying inspection.

=== Qualifying results ===
| Pos | No. | Driver | Team | Manufacturer | R1 | R2 | R3 |
|---|---|---|---|---|---|---|---|
| 1 | 78 | Martin Truex Jr. | Furniture Row Racing | Toyota | 29.121 | 28.792 | 28.621 |
| 2 | 48 | Jimmie Johnson | Hendrick Motorsports | Chevrolet | 28.952 | 28.815 | 28.705 |
| 3 | 20 | Matt Kenseth | Joe Gibbs Racing | Toyota | 29.135 | 28.818 | 28.784 |
| 4 | 1 | Jamie McMurray | Chip Ganassi Racing | Chevrolet | 28.822 | 28.806 | 28.839 |
| 5 | 5 | Kasey Kahne | Hendrick Motorsports | Chevrolet | 29.058 | 28.809 | 28.847 |
| 6 | 77 | Erik Jones (R) | Furniture Row Racing | Toyota | 28.817 | 28.774 | 28.854 |
| 7 | 18 | Kyle Busch | Joe Gibbs Racing | Toyota | 28.897 | 28.701 | 28.862 |
| 8 | 11 | Denny Hamlin | Joe Gibbs Racing | Toyota | 29.090 | 28.817 | 28.920 |
| 9 | 41 | Kurt Busch | Stewart–Haas Racing | Ford | 29.115 | 28.879 | 28.922 |
| 10 | 2 | Brad Keselowski | Team Penske | Ford | 28.886 | 28.869 | 28.963 |
| 11 | 24 | Chase Elliott | Hendrick Motorsports | Chevrolet | 28.875 | 28.851 | 29.020 |
| 12 | 4 | Kevin Harvick | Stewart–Haas Racing | Ford | 29.089 | 28.897 | — |
| 13 | 22 | Joey Logano | Team Penske | Ford | 28.893 | 28.931 | — |
| 14 | 19 | Daniel Suárez (R) | Joe Gibbs Racing | Toyota | 29.025 | 28.953 | — |
| 15 | 21 | Ryan Blaney | Wood Brothers Racing | Ford | 28.915 | 28.997 | — |
| 16 | 32 | Matt DiBenedetto | Go Fas Racing | Ford | 28.968 | 29.009 | — |
| 17 | 17 | Ricky Stenhouse Jr. | Roush Fenway Racing | Ford | 29.060 | 29.015 | — |
| 18 | 88 | Dale Earnhardt Jr. | Hendrick Motorsports | Chevrolet | 29.081 | 29.029 | — |
| 19 | 14 | Clint Bowyer | Stewart–Haas Racing | Ford | 28.933 | 29.122 | — |
| 20 | 95 | Michael McDowell | Leavine Family Racing | Chevrolet | 29.169 | 29.133 | — |
| 21 | 43 | Aric Almirola | Richard Petty Motorsports | Ford | 29.087 | 29.173 | — |
| 22 | 37 | Chris Buescher | JTG Daugherty Racing | Chevrolet | 29.154 | 29.248 | — |
| 23 | 47 | A. J. Allmendinger | JTG Daugherty Racing | Chevrolet | 29.140 | 29.315 | — |
| 24 | 31 | Ryan Newman | Richard Childress Racing | Chevrolet | 29.179 | — | — |
| 25 | 13 | Ty Dillon (R) | Germain Racing | Chevrolet | 29.210 | — | — |
| 26 | 3 | Austin Dillon | Richard Childress Racing | Chevrolet | 29.219 | — | — |
| 27 | 6 | Trevor Bayne | Roush Fenway Racing | Ford | 29.234 | — | — |
| 28 | 34 | Landon Cassill | Front Row Motorsports | Ford | 29.280 | — | — |
| 29 | 27 | Paul Menard | Richard Childress Racing | Chevrolet | 29.281 | — | — |
| 30 | 10 | Danica Patrick | Stewart–Haas Racing | Ford | 29.436 | — | — |
| 31 | 23 | Corey LaJoie (R) | BK Racing | Toyota | 29.452 | — | — |
| 32 | 38 | David Ragan | Front Row Motorsports | Ford | 29.459 | — | — |
| 33 | 72 | Cole Whitt | TriStar Motorsports | Chevrolet | 29.526 | — | — |
| 34 | 55 | Gray Gaulding (R) | Premium Motorsports | Toyota | 29.748 | — | — |
| 35 | 15 | Reed Sorenson | Premium Motorsports | Chevrolet | 29.819 | — | — |
| 36 | 83 | Ryan Sieg (i) | BK Racing | Toyota | 29.931 | — | — |
| 37 | 33 | Jeffrey Earnhardt | Circle Sport – The Motorsports Group | Chevrolet | 29.966 | — | — |
| 38 | 51 | Josh Bilicki (i) | Rick Ware Racing | Chevrolet | 30.677 | — | — |
| 39 | 42 | Kyle Larson | Chip Ganassi Racing | Chevrolet | 28.597 | 28.544 | 28.568 |
Official qualifying results

== Practice (post-qualifying) ==
=== Second practice ===
Martin Truex Jr. recorded the fastest time in the second practice session with a time of 29.000 seconds and a speed of 131.338 mph (211.368 km/h).

| Pos | No. | Driver | Team | Manufacturer | Time | Speed |
|---|---|---|---|---|---|---|
| 1 | 78 | Martin Truex Jr. | Furniture Row Racing | Toyota | 29.000 | 131.338 |
| 2 | 42 | Kyle Larson | Chip Ganassi Racing | Chevrolet | 29.001 | 131.333 |
| 3 | 48 | Jimmie Johnson | Hendrick Motorsports | Chevrolet | 29.034 | 131.184 |
Official second practice results

=== Final practice ===
Kyle Busch recorded the fastest time in the final practice session with a time of 29.086 seconds and a speed of 131.338 mph (211.368 km/h).

| Pos | No. | Driver | Team | Manufacturer | Time | Speed |
|---|---|---|---|---|---|---|
| 1 | 18 | Kyle Busch | Joe Gibbs Racing | Toyota | 29.086 | 130.950 |
| 2 | 78 | Martin Truex Jr. | Furniture Row Racing | Toyota | 29.171 | 130.568 |
| 3 | 11 | Denny Hamlin | Joe Gibbs Racing | Toyota | 29.171 | 130.568 |
Official final practice results

== Race ==
=== First stage ===
Martin Truex Jr. led the field to the green flag, but Jimmie Johnson received a pass-through penalty for passing him before the start. Kyle Larson, starting last after a failed inspection, advanced to the top ten by Lap 30. Truex held a lead of six-seconds by the Lap 36 competition caution.

During the pit stops, Erik Jones' car made contact with Kasey Kahne's, causing an undetected left-front tire issue. On the Lap 41 restart, the tire failed in Turn 3. Without the inner-liner used at larger tracks, the failure sent Jones into the outside wall, bringing out a second caution.

The race restarted on Lap 47, and run for 21 laps until Cole Whitt suffered an engine failure. Several lead cars short-pitted before the end of the first stage, which concluded with a two-lap sprint. Kyle Busch assumed the lead during pit stops under the subsequent caution.

=== Second stage ===
The race resumed on Lap 84. A fifth caution occurred four laps later when Austin Dillon made contact with Ricky Stenhouse Jr. causing Dillon to spin out in Turn 4.

Returning to green on Lap 93, it went green the remainder of the second stage that concluded on Lap 151, which Kyle Busch won.That brought out the sixth caution. Denny Hamlin exited pit road with the race lead.

=== Final stage ===
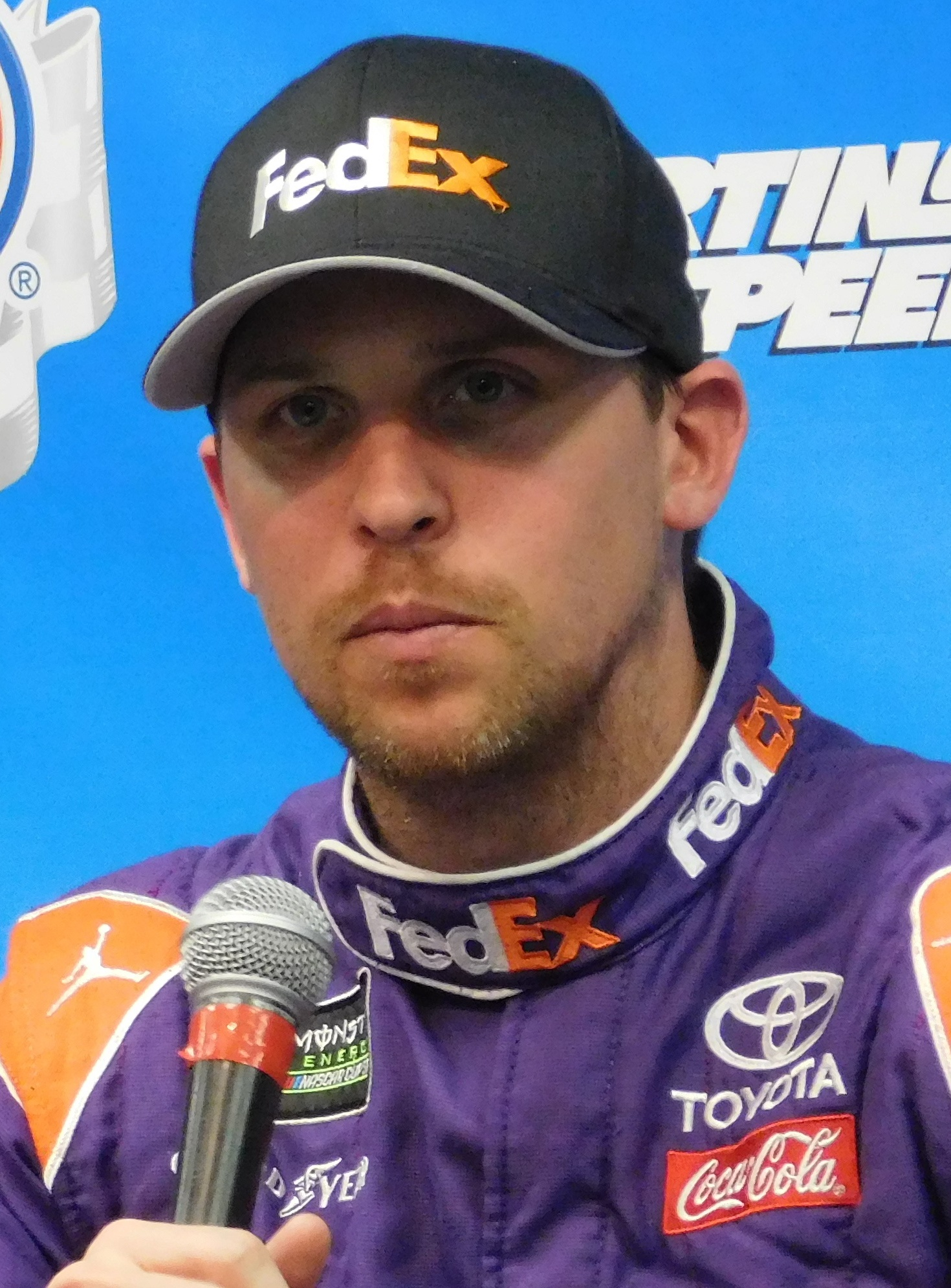
Denny Hamlin won the race.

Restarting on Lap 158, Truex reeled in and passed Hamlin to retake the lead on Lap 175. The race was totally in his control, until a flat right-front tire forced him to hit pit road earlier than planned, handing the lead to Busch with 83 laps to go. Running on much fresher tires, he quickly un-lapped himself with 71 to go just as the leaders started hitting pit road. Busch pitted from the lead with 63 to go, handing the lead to Dale Earnhardt Jr., who pitted with 55 to go, cycling the lead back to Truex. During the pit cycle, Busch was handed a pass-through penalty for speeding on pit road.

But while the tire advantage played in his favor in the 28 laps he worked to get back to the lead, it turned against him after the pit cycle. Matt Kenseth cut the gap and edged out Truex at the line to take the lead with 41 to go. Caution flew for the seventh time a lap later when Ryan Newman spun out in Turn 2. Kenseth exited pit road first, but did so taking only right-side tires, which proved costly. Hamlin and Truex, who both took four, followed Kenseth out in second and third. Dale Earnhardt Jr. stayed out to assume the lead.

Restarting with 35 to go, Hamlin took the lead from Kenseth exiting Turn 4 with 33 to go. Larson took over second with 23 to go, closed the gap to less than two seconds with 16 to go and less than a second with nine to go. He ran into lapped traffic with seven to go and the gap didn't change for a lap. This proved key to Hamlin pulling away, even when Larson closed the gap to three car-lengths with three to go, and driving on to victory.

== Post-race ==
During the pre-race show, Daniel Suárez gave a fan a box of Dunkin' Donuts, a competitor brand and food product of one of his sponsors, Subway. As a result, Subway terminated their sponsorship with Suárez in September.

=== Driver comments ===
Hamlin said after the race that he was doing all he "could to pace (Larson). I knew he had a very fast car. It just seemed like we were able to get off the corner pretty good and I just ran kind of a pace there which I felt comfortable with. And just in case we had a restart, they wanted to burn the tires up."

Larson said of "another hard-fought race" it was "the third time" his team started from the rear and "drove up to second. I wish we could have been a spot better again, but really proud of my team and proud of the cars that they’re bringing for me to drive each and every week. It’s been a tough couple weeks through the tech line, so if we make it through here and then have a good Tuesday at NASCAR, but we’ll see.”

== Race results ==
=== Stage results ===
Stage 1 Laps: 75

| Pos | No | Driver | Team | Manufacturer | Points |
|---|---|---|---|---|---|
| 1 | 78 | Martin Truex Jr. | Furniture Row Racing | Toyota | 10 |
| 2 | 20 | Matt Kenseth | Joe Gibbs Racing | Toyota | 9 |
| 3 | 42 | Kyle Larson | Chip Ganassi Racing | Chevrolet | 8 |
| 4 | 1 | Jamie McMurray | Chip Ganassi Racing | Chevrolet | 7 |
| 5 | 18 | Kyle Busch | Joe Gibbs Racing | Toyota | 6 |
| 6 | 5 | Kasey Kahne | Hendrick Motorsports | Chevrolet | 5 |
| 7 | 31 | Ryan Newman | Richard Childress Racing | Chevrolet | 4 |
| 8 | 21 | Ryan Blaney | Wood Brothers Racing | Ford | 3 |
| 9 | 11 | Denny Hamlin | Joe Gibbs Racing | Toyota | 2 |
| 10 | 24 | Chase Elliott | Hendrick Motorsports | Chevrolet | 1 |
Official stage one results

Stage 2 Laps: 75

| Pos | No | Driver | Team | Manufacturer | Points |
|---|---|---|---|---|---|
| 1 | 18 | Kyle Busch | Joe Gibbs Racing | Toyota | 10 |
| 2 | 11 | Denny Hamlin | Joe Gibbs Racing | Toyota | 9 |
| 3 | 4 | Kevin Harvick | Stewart–Haas Racing | Ford | 8 |
| 4 | 41 | Kurt Busch | Stewart–Haas Racing | Ford | 7 |
| 5 | 48 | Jimmie Johnson | Hendrick Motorsports | Chevrolet | 6 |
| 6 | 78 | Martin Truex Jr. | Furniture Row Racing | Toyota | 5 |
| 7 | 20 | Matt Kenseth | Joe Gibbs Racing | Toyota | 4 |
| 8 | 21 | Ryan Blaney | Wood Brothers Racing | Ford | 3 |
| 9 | 42 | Kyle Larson | Chip Ganassi Racing | Chevrolet | 2 |
| 10 | 14 | Clint Bowyer | Stewart–Haas Racing | Ford | 1 |
Official stage two results

=== Final stage results ===
Stage 3 Laps: 151

| Pos | Grid | No | Driver | Team | Manufacturer | Laps | Points |
|---|---|---|---|---|---|---|---|
| 1 | 8 | 11 | Denny Hamlin | Joe Gibbs Racing | Toyota | 301 | 51 |
| 2 | 39 | 42 | Kyle Larson | Chip Ganassi Racing | Chevrolet | 301 | 45 |
| 3 | 1 | 78 | Martin Truex Jr. | Furniture Row Racing | Toyota | 301 | 49 |
| 4 | 3 | 20 | Matt Kenseth | Joe Gibbs Racing | Toyota | 301 | 46 |
| 5 | 12 | 4 | Kevin Harvick | Stewart–Haas Racing | Ford | 301 | 40 |
| 6 | 14 | 19 | Daniel Suárez (R) | Joe Gibbs Racing | Toyota | 301 | 31 |
| 7 | 19 | 14 | Clint Bowyer | Stewart–Haas Racing | Ford | 301 | 31 |
| 8 | 9 | 41 | Kurt Busch | Stewart–Haas Racing | Ford | 301 | 36 |
| 9 | 10 | 2 | Brad Keselowski | Team Penske | Ford | 301 | 28 |
| 10 | 2 | 48 | Jimmie Johnson | Hendrick Motorsports | Chevrolet | 301 | 33 |
| 11 | 11 | 24 | Chase Elliott | Hendrick Motorsports | Chevrolet | 301 | 27 |
| 12 | 7 | 18 | Kyle Busch | Joe Gibbs Racing | Toyota | 301 | 41 |
| 13 | 30 | 10 | Danica Patrick | Stewart–Haas Racing | Ford | 301 | 24 |
| 14 | 17 | 17 | Ricky Stenhouse Jr. | Roush Fenway Racing | Ford | 301 | 23 |
| 15 | 26 | 3 | Austin Dillon | Richard Childress Racing | Chevrolet | 301 | 22 |
| 16 | 25 | 13 | Ty Dillon (R) | Germain Racing | Chevrolet | 301 | 21 |
| 17 | 4 | 1 | Jamie McMurray | Chip Ganassi Racing | Chevrolet | 301 | 27 |
| 18 | 18 | 88 | Dale Earnhardt Jr. | Hendrick Motorsports | Chevrolet | 301 | 19 |
| 19 | 15 | 21 | Ryan Blaney | Wood Brothers Racing | Ford | 301 | 24 |
| 20 | 27 | 6 | Trevor Bayne | Roush Fenway Racing | Ford | 301 | 17 |
| 21 | 23 | 47 | A. J. Allmendinger | JTG Daugherty Racing | Chevrolet | 301 | 16 |
| 22 | 29 | 27 | Paul Menard | Richard Childress Racing | Chevrolet | 301 | 15 |
| 23 | 28 | 34 | Landon Cassill | Front Row Motorsports | Ford | 301 | 14 |
| 24 | 21 | 43 | Aric Almirola | Richard Petty Motorsports | Ford | 301 | 13 |
| 25 | 22 | 37 | Chris Buescher | JTG Daugherty Racing | Chevrolet | 300 | 12 |
| 26 | 20 | 95 | Michael McDowell | Leavine Family Racing | Chevrolet | 300 | 11 |
| 27 | 24 | 31 | Ryan Newman | Richard Childress Racing | Chevrolet | 300 | 14 |
| 28 | 5 | 5 | Kasey Kahne | Hendrick Motorsports | Chevrolet | 300 | 14 |
| 29 | 32 | 38 | David Ragan | Front Row Motorsports | Ford | 300 | 8 |
| 30 | 16 | 32 | Matt DiBenedetto | Go Fas Racing | Ford | 299 | 7 |
| 31 | 31 | 23 | Corey LaJoie (R) | BK Racing | Toyota | 298 | 6 |
| 32 | 36 | 83 | Ryan Sieg (i) | BK Racing | Toyota | 298 | 0 |
| 33 | 37 | 33 | Jeffrey Earnhardt | Circle Sport – The Motorsports Group | Chevrolet | 297 | 4 |
| 34 | 35 | 15 | Reed Sorenson | Premium Motorsports | Chevrolet | 296 | 3 |
| 35 | 34 | 55 | Gray Gaulding (R) | Premium Motorsports | Toyota | 295 | 2 |
| 36 | 38 | 51 | Josh Bilicki (i) | Rick Ware Racing | Chevrolet | 290 | 0 |
| 37 | 13 | 22 | Joey Logano | Team Penske | Ford | 269 | 1 |
| 38 | 33 | 72 | Cole Whitt | TriStar Motorsports | Chevrolet | 66 | 1 |
| 39 | 6 | 77 | Erik Jones (R) | Furniture Row Racing | Toyota | 40 | 1 |
Official race results

=== Race statistics ===
- Lead changes: 6 among different drivers
- Cautions/Laps: 7 for 34
- Red flags: 1 for 5 minutes and 29 seconds
- Time of race: 3 hours, 0 minutes and 36 seconds
- Average speed: 105.800 miles per hour (170.269 km/h)

== Media ==
=== Television ===
NBC Sports covered the race on the television side. Rick Allen, Jeff Burton and Steve Letarte had the call in the booth for the race. Dave Burns, Marty Snider and Kelli Stavast reported from pit lane during the race.

NBCSN
| Booth announcers | Pit reporters |
|---|---|
| Lap-by-lap: Rick Allen; Color-commentator: Jeff Burton; Color-commentator: Steve Letarte | Dave Burns; Marty Snider; Kelli Stavast |

=== Radio ===
PRN had the radio call for the race, which was simulcast on Sirius XM NASCAR Radio.

PRN
| Booth announcers | Turn announcers | Pit reporters |
|---|---|---|
| Lead announcer: Doug Rice; Announcer: Mark Garrow; Announcer: Wendy Venturini | Turns 1 & 2: Rob Albright; Turns 3 & 4: Pat Patterson | Brad Gillie; Brett McMillan; Jim Noble; Steve Richards |

== Standings after the race ==
Drivers' Championship standings

| | Pos | Driver | Points |
|---|---|---|---|
| 1 | 1 | Martin Truex Jr. | 758 |
| 1 | 2 | Kyle Larson | 720 (–38) |
| | 3 | Kyle Busch | 650 (–108) |
| | 4 | Kevin Harvick | 639 (–119) |
| 2 | 5 | Denny Hamlin | 589 (–169) |
| 1 | 6 | Chase Elliott | 587 (–171) |
| 1 | 7 | Jamie McMurray | 572 (–186) |
| | 8 | Brad Keselowski | 564 (–194) |
| | 9 | Jimmie Johnson | 552 (–206) |
| | 10 | Clint Bowyer | 526 (–232) |
| | 11 | Matt Kenseth | 524 (–234) |
| 1 | 12 | Ryan Blaney | 486 (–272) |
| 1 | 13 | Joey Logano | 472 (–286) |
| 1 | 14 | Kurt Busch | 455 (–303) |
| 1 | 15 | Ricky Stenhouse Jr. | 441 (–317) |
| 1 | 16 | Ryan Newman | 428 (–330) |
Official driver's standings

Manufacturers' Championship standings

| Pos | Manufacturer | Points |
|---|---|---|
| 1 | Chevrolet | 680 |
| 2 | Ford | 674 (–6) |
| 3 | Toyota | 652 (–28) |
Official manufacturers' standings

- Note: Only the first 16 positions are included for the driver standings.
- . – Driver has clinched a position in the Monster Energy NASCAR Cup Series playoffs.

| Previous race: 2017 Quaker State 400 | Monster Energy NASCAR Cup Series; 2017 season | Next race: 2017 Brickyard 400 |
