= 2012 AdvoCare 500 =

Two different races were named AdvoCare 500 in 2012:

- The 2012 AdvoCare 500 (Atlanta), a NASCAR Sprint Cup Series race held at Atlanta Motor Speedway held on September 2(now Folds of Honor Quiktrip 500)
- The 2012 AdvoCare 500 (Phoenix), a NASCAR Sprint Cup Series race held at Phoenix International Raceway held on November 11 (now Bluegreen Vacations 500)
