= 2011 Showtime Southern 500 =

Race details
- Race 10 of 36 in the 2011 NASCAR Sprint Cup Series
- The 2011 Showtime Southern 500 program cover.
- Date: May 7, 2011
- Location: Darlington Raceway near Darlington, South Carolina
- Course: Permanent racing facility
- Course length: 1.366 miles (2.198 km)
- Distance: 370 laps, 505.42 mi (813.394 km)
- Weather: Partly cloudy and chilly in the evening; with temperatures hovering around 64.3 °F (17.9 °C) and wind speeds climbing up to 8.9 miles per hour (14.3 km/h)

Pole position
Driver	Kasey Kahne	Red Bull Racing Team
- Time: 27.131

Most laps led
Driver	Kasey Kahne	Red Bull Racing Team
- Laps: 124

Winner
No. 78	Regan Smith	Furniture Row Racing

Television in the United States
- Network: Fox
- Announcers: Mike Joy, Darrell Waltrip and Larry McReynolds

The 2011 Showtime Southern 500, the 62nd running of the event, was a NASCAR Sprint Cup Series stock car race held on May 7, 2011 at Darlington Raceway in Darlington, South Carolina. Contested over 370 laps, 3 laps over the advertised distance, it was the tenth race of the 2011 NASCAR Sprint Cup Series season out of thirty-six. The pole position was won by Kasey Kahne of Red Bull Racing Team. The race was won by Regan Smith of Furniture Row Racing, the first win for both Smith and the team, with Carl Edwards in second and Brad Keselowski in third.

== Report ==
The layout of Darlington Raceway, the venue where the race was held.

=== Background ===
Darlington Raceway is the second oldest speedway on the NASCAR schedule next to Martinsville Speedway. From above, the track has been long described as being shaped similar to an egg. Consequently, the track's banking is also affected by its shape. The frontstretch and backstretch are banked at 3° and 2°, respectively. Turns 1 and 2, which have a wider radius, are banked at 25° and turns 3 and 4, which are much tighter than the first two, carry 23° of banking.

Prior to the race, Carl Edwards held the Drivers' Championship lead with 326 points. Defending champion Jimmie Johnson was in second place, 9 points back, followed by Richmond Kyle Busch in third, 21 points behind Johnson. Four points behind Busch was Dale Earnhardt Jr. in fourth with Kevin Harvick one point behind in fifth. Kurt Busch, with 289 points, was in sixth followed by Clint Bowyer who was 5 points behind Busch. Ryan Newman, Matt Kenseth, and Tony Stewart rounded out the top 10 in points, all 3 separated by 3 points. Defending race winner Denny Hamlin was 17th in points. A. J. Allmendinger and Jeff Gordon remained in the wild card positions.

In the owner points battle, Tommy Baldwin Racing moved into the top-35 in owners' points for the first time on the heels of a 13th-place finish at Richmond, leading to a 3-way tie for 35th between the #32 team of FAS Lane Racing, the #13 team of Germain Racing, and the #71 team of TRG Motorsports.

No.	Driver	Team	Make
00	David Reutimann	Michael Waltrip Racing	Toyota
1	Jamie McMurray	Earnhardt Ganassi Racing	Chevrolet
2	Brad Keselowski	Penske Racing	Dodge
4	Kasey Kahne	Red Bull Racing Team	Toyota
5	Mark Martin	Hendrick Motorsports	Chevrolet
6	David Ragan	Roush Fenway Racing	Ford
7	Robby Gordon	Robby Gordon Motorsports	Dodge
9	Marcos Ambrose	Richard Petty Motorsports	Ford
09	Landon Cassill	Phoenix Racing	Chevrolet
11	Denny Hamlin	Joe Gibbs Racing	Toyota
13	Casey Mears	Germain Racing	Toyota
14	Tony Stewart	Stewart–Haas Racing	Chevrolet
16	Greg Biffle	Roush Fenway Racing	Ford
17	Matt Kenseth	Roush Fenway Racing	Ford
18	Kyle Busch	Joe Gibbs Racing	Toyota
20	Joey Logano	Joe Gibbs Racing	Toyota
22	Kurt Busch	Penske Racing	Dodge
24	Jeff Gordon	Hendrick Motorsports	Chevrolet
27	Paul Menard	Richard Childress Racing	Chevrolet
29	Kevin Harvick	Richard Childress Racing	Chevrolet
30	David Stremme	Inception Motorsports	Chevrolet
31	Jeff Burton	Richard Childress Racing	Chevrolet
32	Ken Schrader	FAS Lane Racing	Ford
33	Clint Bowyer	Richard Childress Racing	Chevrolet
34	David Gilliland	Front Row Motorsports	Ford
36	Dave Blaney	Tommy Baldwin Racing	Chevrolet
37	Tony Raines	Max Q Motorsports	Ford
38	Travis Kvapil	Front Row Motorsports	Ford
39	Ryan Newman	Stewart–Haas Racing	Chevrolet
42	Juan Pablo Montoya	Earnhardt Ganassi Racing	Chevrolet
43	A.J. Allmendinger	Richard Petty Motorsports	Ford
46	J.J. Yeley	Whitney Motorsports	Chevrolet
47	Bobby Labonte	JTG Daugherty Racing	Toyota
48	Jimmie Johnson	Hendrick Motorsports	Chevrolet
50	T.J. Bell	LTD Powersports, LLC	Toyota
56	Martin Truex Jr.	Michael Waltrip Racing	Toyota
60	Mike Skinner	Germain Racing	Toyota
66	Michael McDowell	HP Racing	Toyota
71	Andy Lally	TRG Motorsports	Ford
75	Derrike Cope*	Stratus Racing Group	Dodge
78	Regan Smith	Furniture Row Racing	Chevrolet
81	Scott Riggs	Whitney Motorsports	Chevrolet
83	Brian Vickers	Red Bull Racing Team	Toyota
87	Joe Nemechek	NEMCO Motorsports	Toyota
88	Dale Earnhardt Jr.	Hendrick Motorsports	Chevrolet
92	Brian Keselowski	K-Automotive Motorsports	Dodge
99	Carl Edwards	Roush Fenway Racing	Ford

*Withdrew.

=== Qualifying ===
Kasey Kahne would win the pole with a 27.131. Meanwhile, Scott Riggs would blow an engine coming into his second lap of his qualifying run. While he had set a time, it was not enough to get Riggs into the race, as Joe Nemechek would beat his time.

Pos.	No.	Driver	Team	Make	Time	Speed
1	4	Kasey Kahne	Red Bull Racing Team	Toyota	27.131	181.254
2	39	Ryan Newman	Stewart–Haas Racing	Chevrolet	27.255	180.429
3	11	Denny Hamlin	Joe Gibbs Racing	Toyota	27.300	180.132
4	99	Carl Edwards	Roush Fenway Racing	Ford	27.323	179.980
5	24	Jeff Gordon	Hendrick Motorsports	Chevrolet	27.346	179.829
6	9	Marcos Ambrose	Richard Petty Motorsports	Ford	27.370	179.671
7	43	A.J. Allmendinger	Richard Petty Motorsports	Ford	27.404	179.448
8	83	Brian Vickers	Red Bull Racing Team	Toyota	27.433	179.259
9	14	Tony Stewart	Stewart–Haas Racing	Chevrolet	27.456	179.108
10	2	Brad Keselowski	Penske Racing	Dodge	27.460	179.082
11	6	David Ragan	Roush Fenway Racing	Ford	27.461	179.076
12	1	Jamie McMurray	Earnhardt Ganassi Racing	Chevrolet	27.491	178.880
13	29	Kevin Harvick	Richard Childress Racing	Chevrolet	27.536	178.588
14	18	Kyle Busch	Joe Gibbs Racing	Toyota	27.558	178.445
15	47	Bobby Labonte	JTG Daugherty Racing	Toyota	27.568	178.381
16	42	Juan Pablo Montoya	Earnhardt Ganassi Racing	Chevrolet	27.586	178.264
17	20	Joey Logano	Joe Gibbs Racing	Toyota	27.602	178.161
18	27	Paul Menard	Richard Childress Racing	Chevrolet	27.611	178.103
19	48	Jimmie Johnson	Hendrick Motorsports	Chevrolet	27.621	178.038
20	17	Matt Kenseth	Roush Fenway Racing	Ford	27.628	177.993
21	38	Travis Kvapil	Front Row Motorsports	Ford	27.629	177.987
22	16	Greg Biffle	Roush Fenway Racing	Ford	27.634	177.955
23	78	Regan Smith	Furniture Row Racing	Chevrolet	27.647	177.871
24	31	Jeff Burton	Richard Childress Racing	Chevrolet	27.654	177.826
25	22	Kurt Busch	Penske Racing	Dodge	27.665	177.755
26	33	Clint Bowyer	Richard Childress Racing	Chevrolet	27.670	177.723
27	09	Landon Cassill	Phoenix Racing	Chevrolet	27.678	177.672
28	5	Mark Martin	Hendrick Motorsports	Chevrolet	27.687	177.614
29	56	Martin Truex Jr.	Michael Waltrip Racing	Toyota	27.770	177.083
30	88	Dale Earnhardt Jr.	Hendrick Motorsports	Chevrolet	27.827	176.720
31	46	J.J. Yeley	Whitney Motorsports	Chevrolet	27.833	176.682
32	13	Casey Mears	Germain Racing	Toyota	27.879	176.391
33	50	T.J. Bell	LTD Powersports, LLC	Toyota	27.903	176.239
34	60	Mike Skinner	Germain Racing	Toyota	27.909	176.201
35	37	Tony Raines	Max Q Motorsports	Ford	27.911	176.189
36	00	David Reutimann	Michael Waltrip Racing	Toyota	27.921	176.125
37	34	David Gilliland	Front Row Motorsports	Ford	28.025	175.472
38	30	David Stremme	Inception Motorsports	Chevrolet	28.035	175.409
39	66	Michael McDowell	HP Racing	Toyota	28.044	175.353
40	32	Ken Schrader	FAS Lane Racing	Ford	28.054	175.291
41	36	Dave Blaney	Tommy Baldwin Racing	Chevrolet	28.225	174.229
42	7	Robby Gordon	Robby Gordon Motorsports	Dodge	28.235	174.167
Last to make it on time (car that is not locked in by owner's points)
43	87	Joe Nemechek	NEMCO Motorsports	Toyota	28.165	174.600
Failed to qualify or withdrew
44	81	Scott Riggs	Whitney Motorsports	Chevrolet	28.247	174.093
45	71	Andy Lally	TRG Motorsports	Ford	28.613	171.866
46	92	Brian Keselowski	K-Automotive Motorsports	Dodge	28.776	170.892
WD	75	Derrike Cope	Stratus Racing Group	Dodge	0.000	0.000

=== Race ===
Regan Smith pulled off an upset and won the Showtime Southern 500 after holding off Carl Edwards on a late restart. There were 11 caution flags, the wildest one happening with 4 laps to go. During a 3 wide situation, Harvick got into Kyle Busch, who in turn got into Bowyer, who slammed the inside wall. He was not injured. Kyle Busch then turned around Harvick in Turn 1. After the race finished Harvick wanted to get Kyle Busch out of the car. After that didn't happen, Harvick went to Busch's car and threw a punch inside Busch's driver window, but Busch then drove off and Busch's car pushed Harvick's #29 car into the pit road wall instead. Tempers flared, and the incident further inflamed the tensions between the two men. After the race Busch and Harvick were both fined $25,000 and placed on probation for 4 races including the All Star Race.

== Race results ==
Fin	#	Driver	Team	Make	Laps	Led	Status	Pts	Winnings
1	78	Regan Smith	Furniture Row Racing	Chevrolet	370	11	running	47	$272,745
2	99	Carl Edwards	Roush Fenway Racing	Ford	370	57	running	43	$248,966
3	2	Brad Keselowski	Penske Racing	Dodge	370	0	running	41	$178,358
4	4	Kasey Kahne	Red Bull Racing Team	Toyota	370	124	running	42	$164,648
5	39	Ryan Newman	Stewart–Haas Racing	Chevrolet	370	28	running	40	$165,025
6	11	Denny Hamlin	Joe Gibbs Racing	Toyota	370	0	running	38	$152,000
7	14	Tony Stewart	Stewart–Haas Racing	Chevrolet	370	6	running	38	$141,758
8	16	Greg Biffle	Roush Fenway Racing	Ford	370	0	running	36	$117,350
9	1	Jamie McMurray	Earnhardt Ganassi Racing	Chevrolet	370	13	running	36	$128,614
10	56	Martin Truex Jr.	Michael Waltrip Racing	Toyota	370	1	running	35	$100,550
11	18	Kyle Busch	Joe Gibbs Racing	Toyota	370	78	running	34	$134,991
12	24	Jeff Gordon	Hendrick Motorsports	Chevrolet	370	0	running	32	$126,836
13	9	Marcos Ambrose	Richard Petty Motorsports	Ford	370	0	running	31	$120,066
14	88	Dale Earnhardt Jr.	Hendrick Motorsports	Chevrolet	370	0	running	30	$96,100
15	48	Jimmie Johnson	Hendrick Motorsports	Chevrolet	370	0	running	29	$137,761
16	00	David Reutimann	Michael Waltrip Racing	Toyota	370	0	running	28	$114,408
17	29	Kevin Harvick	Richard Childress Racing	Chevrolet	370	47	running	28	$141,111
18	47	Bobby Labonte	JTG Daugherty Racing	Toyota	370	2	running	27	$112,270
19	5	Mark Martin	Hendrick Motorsports	Chevrolet	369	0	running	25	$92,150
20	43	A.J. Allmendinger	Richard Petty Motorsports	Ford	369	0	running	24	$121,486
21	6	David Ragan	Roush Fenway Racing	Ford	369	0	running	23	$91,125
22	27	Paul Menard	Richard Childress Racing	Chevrolet	369	0	running	22	$89,850
23	42	Juan Pablo Montoya	Earnhardt Ganassi Racing	Chevrolet	368	0	running	21	$119,758
24	36	Dave Blaney	Tommy Baldwin Racing	Chevrolet	367	0	running	20	$99,258
25	17	Matt Kenseth	Roush Fenway Racing	Ford	366	0	running	19	$117,486
26	38	Travis Kvapil	Front Row Motorsports	Ford	365	0	running	0	$90,633
27	22	Kurt Busch	Penske Racing	Dodge	364	0	running	17	$119,775
28	32	Ken Schrader	FAS Lane Racing	Ford	364	2	running	17	$87,822
29	09	Landon Cassill	Phoenix Racing	Chevrolet	364	0	running	0	$77,075
30	13	Casey Mears	Germain Racing	Toyota	364	1	running	15	$77,900
31	33	Clint Bowyer	Richard Childress Racing	Chevrolet	363	0	crash	13	$118,083
32	34	David Gilliland	Front Row Motorsports	Ford	362	0	running	12	$73,075
33	31	Jeff Burton	Richard Childress Racing	Chevrolet	358	0	engine	11	$82,525
34	83	Brian Vickers	Red Bull Racing Team	Toyota	332	0	running	10	$100,664
35	20	Joey Logano	Joe Gibbs Racing	Toyota	318	0	running	9	$81,200
36	37	Tony Raines	Max Q Motorsports	Ford	172	0	brakes	8	$72,775
37	7	Robby Gordon	Robby Gordon Motorsports	Dodge	87	0	brakes	7	$72,585
38	50	T.J. Bell	LTD Powersports, LLC	Toyota	67	0	transmission	0	$72,350
39	46	J.J. Yeley	Whitney Motorsports	Chevrolet	34	0	engine	5	$72,250
40	60	Mike Skinner	Germain Racing	Toyota	29	0	brakes	0	$72,050
41	30	David Stremme	Inception Motorsports	Chevrolet	27	0	electrical	3	$71,875
42	87	Joe Nemechek	NEMCO Motorsports	Toyota	22	0	electrical	0	$71,780
43	66	Michael McDowell	HP Racing	Toyota	7	0	vibration	1	$72,139

Previous race: 2011 Crown Royal Presents the Matthew and Daniel Hansen 400	Sprint Cup Series; 2011 season	Next race: 2011 FedEx 400
