= 2012 GEICO 400 =

Race details
- Race 27 of 36 in the 2012 NASCAR Sprint Cup Series
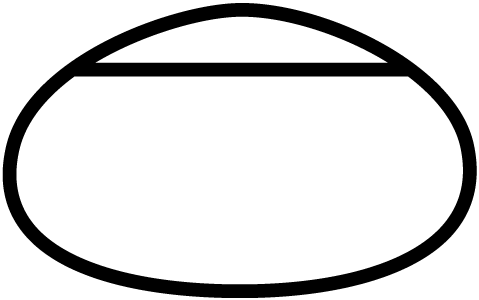
- Map of the track
- Date: September 16, 2012
- Location: Chicagoland Speedway in Joliet, Illinois
- Course: Permanent racing facility
- Course length: 1.500 miles (2.414 km)
- Distance: 267 laps, 400.5 mi (644.5 km)
- Weather: Clear with a high temperature around 80 °F (27 °C); wind out of the WSW at 6 mph (9.7 km/h).

Pole position
Driver	Jimmie Johnson	Hendrick Motorsports
- Time: 29.530

Most laps led
Driver	Jimmie Johnson	Hendrick Motorsports
- Laps: 172

Winner
No. 2	Brad Keselowski	Penske Racing

Television in the United States
- Network: ESPN
- Announcers: Allen Bestwick, Dale Jarrett and Andy Petree

The 2012 GEICO 400 was a NASCAR Sprint Cup Series race held on September 16, 2012, at Chicagoland Speedway in Joliet, Illinois. Contested over 267 laps, it was the twenty-seventh in the 2012 NASCAR Sprint Cup Series, as well as the first race in the ten-race Chase for the Sprint Cup, which ends the season.

== Report ==
=== Background ===
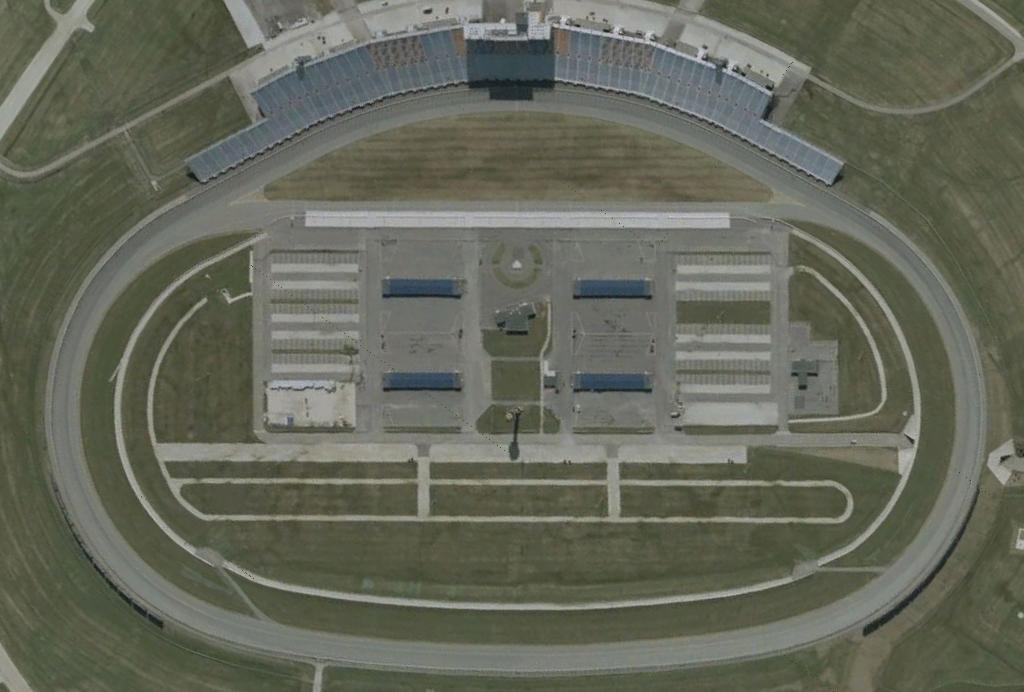
Chicagoland Speedway, the race track where the race was held.

Chicagoland Speedway is one of ten intermediate tracks to hold NASCAR races. The standard track at Chicagoland Speedway is a four-turn tri-oval track that is 1.5 miles (2.4 km) long. The track's turns are each banked at 18 degrees and have a turn width of 55 feet. The racetrack has a grandstand capacity of 75,000.

Before the race, Denny Hamlin led the Drivers' Championship with 2,012 points, with Jimmie Johnson in second place with, 2,009. Tony Stewart and Brad Keselowski were tied with Johnson for the second position, while Greg Biffle had 2,006 points. Clint Bowyer also with 2,006 points was one point ahead of Dale Earnhardt Jr. and Matt Kenseth, as Kevin Harvick and Martin Truex Jr. rounded out the top ten with 2,000 points each. In the parallel Chase for the Sprint Cup, Kasey Kahne and Jeff Gordon both started with their points total reset to 2,000. In the Manufacturers' Championship, Chevrolet was leading with 179 points, twenty-four points ahead of Toyota. Ford, with 129 points, was twenty points ahead of Dodge in the battle for third place. Stewart was the race's defending winner.

=== Practice and qualifying ===
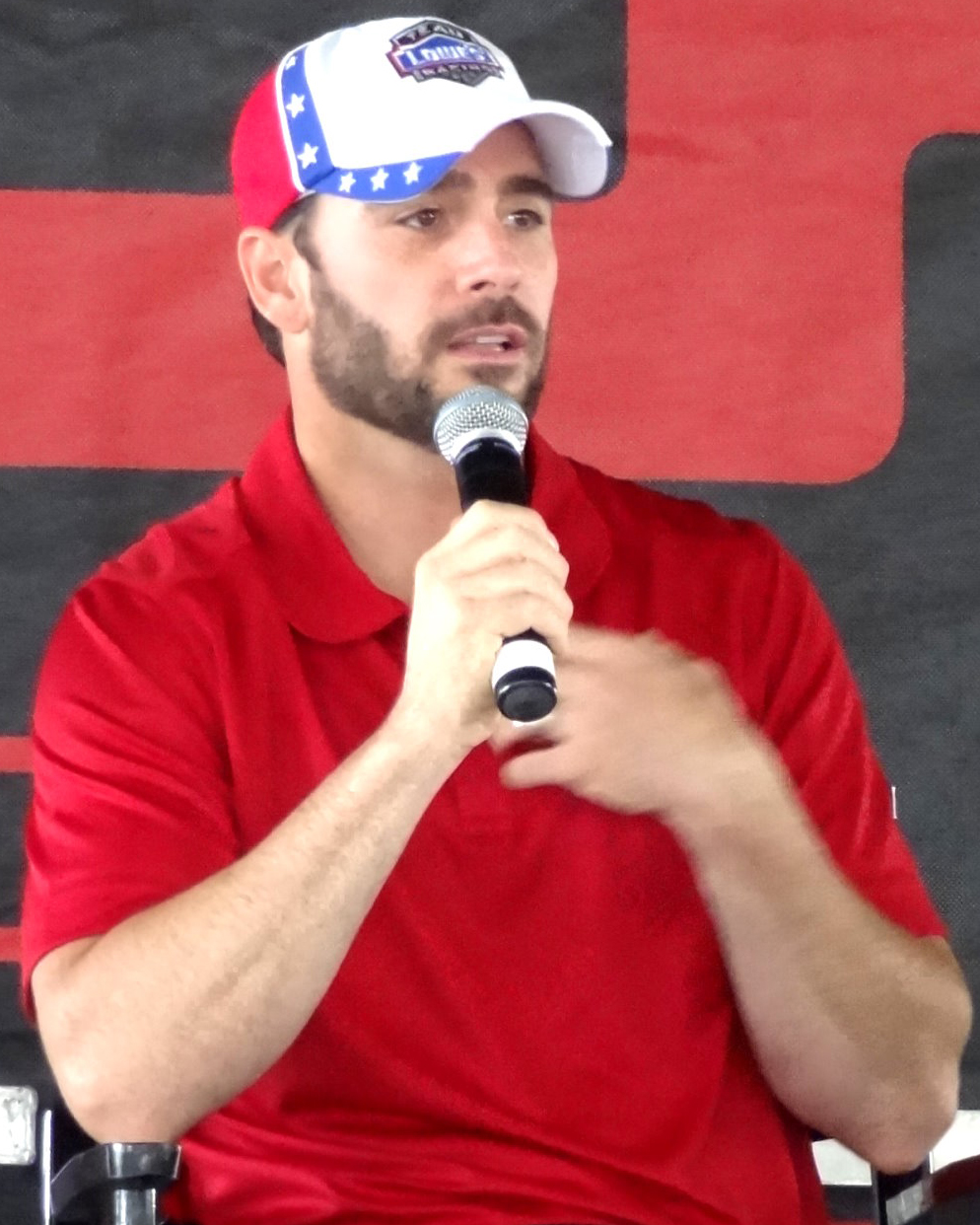
Jimmie Johnson (shown here in 2011) won the pole position with a time of 29.530

Two practice sessions were held in preparation for the race; both on Friday, September 14, 2012. The first session and second session lasted for 90 minutes each. During the first practice session, Truex Jr., for the Michael Waltrip Racing team, was quickest ahead of Earnhardt Jr. in second and Keselowski in third. Trevor Bayne was scored fourth, and Hamlin managed fifth. Jamie McMurray, Mark Martin, Jeff Burton, Carl Edwards and Ryan Newman rounded out the top ten quickest drivers in the session.

Kyle Busch was quickest in the second and final practice session, ahead of Aric Almirola in second, and Martin in third. Edwards was fourth quickest, and Hamlin took fifth. Kahne, Johnson, Bayne, Kenseth, and Gordon followed in the top ten. Of the other drivers in the Chase for the Sprint Cup, Stewart was scored fourteenth fastest, while Truex Jr. was scored twenty-fifth.

Forty-seven cars were entered for qualifying, but only forty-three could race because of NASCAR's qualifying procedure. Johnson clinched his second pole position in the season, with a time of 29.530. He was joined on the front row of the grid by Almirola. Kenseth qualified third, Earnhardt Jr. took fourth, and Edwards started fifth. Biffle, one of the drivers in the Chase for the Sprint Cup, qualified twenty-second, while Harvick was scored thirty-fifth. The four drivers that failed to qualify for the race were Scott Riggs, Reed Sorenson, J. J. Yeley, and Jason Leffler.

== Results ==
=== Race results ===
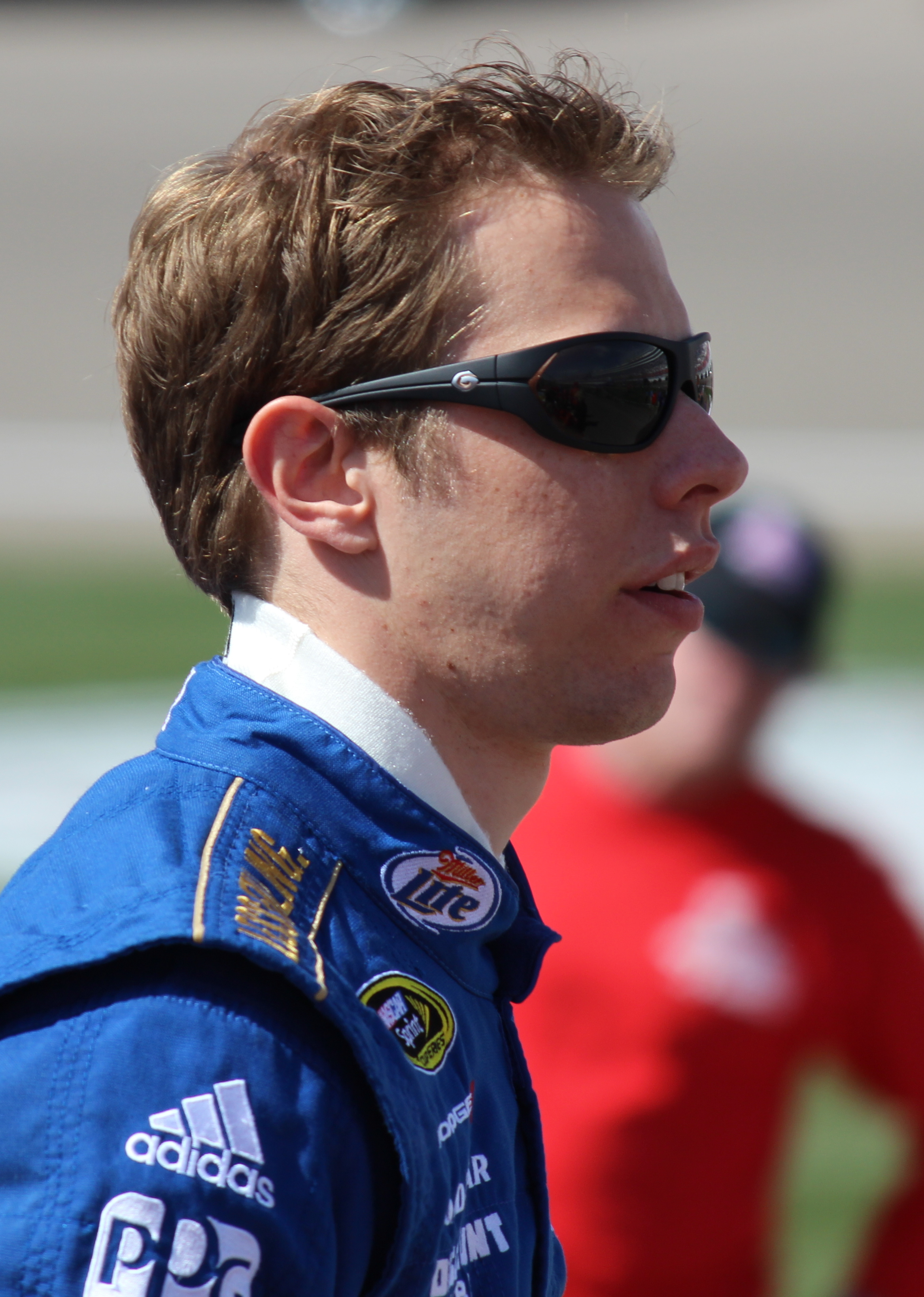
Brad Keselowski won the race.

Pos	Grid	Car	Driver	Team	Manufacturer	Laps run	Points
1	13	2	Brad Keselowski	Penske Racing	Dodge	267	47
2	1	48	Jimmie Johnson	Hendrick Motorsports	Chevrolet	267	44
3	6	5	Kasey Kahne	Hendrick Motorsports	Chevrolet	267	41
4	21	18	Kyle Busch	Joe Gibbs Racing	Toyota	267	40
5	20	39	Ryan Newman	Stewart–Haas Racing	Chevrolet	267	39
6	29	14	Tony Stewart	Stewart–Haas Racing	Chevrolet	267	39
7	10	20	Joey Logano	Joe Gibbs Racing	Toyota	267	37
8	4	88	Dale Earnhardt Jr.	Hendrick Motorsports	Chevrolet	267	36
9	18	56	Martin Truex Jr.	Michael Waltrip Racing	Toyota	267	35
10	9	15	Clint Bowyer	Michael Waltrip Racing	Toyota	267	35
11	16	22	Sam Hornish Jr.	Penske Racing	Dodge	267	-
12	35	29	Kevin Harvick	Richard Childress Racing	Chevrolet	267	32
13	22	16	Greg Biffle	Roush Fenway Racing	Ford	267	31
14	15	55	Mark Martin	Michael Waltrip Racing	Toyota	267	30
15	11	27	Paul Menard	Richard Childress Racing	Chevrolet	267	29
16	8	11	Denny Hamlin	Joe Gibbs Racing	Toyota	267	29
17	2	43	Aric Almirola	Richard Petty Motorsports	Ford	266	28
18	3	17	Matt Kenseth	Roush Fenway Racing	Ford	266	27
19	5	99	Carl Edwards	Roush Fenway Racing	Ford	266	25
20	14	21	Trevor Bayne	Wood Brothers Racing	Ford	266	-
21	12	1	Jamie McMurray	Earnhardt Ganassi Racing	Chevrolet	266	24
22	37	34	David Ragan	Front Row Motorsports	Ford	266	23
23	28	42	Juan Pablo Montoya	Earnhardt Ganassi Racing	Chevrolet	265	21
24	32	31	Jeff Burton	Richard Childress Racing	Chevrolet	265	20
25	41	10	Danica Patrick	Tommy Baldwin Racing	Chevrolet	265	-
26	23	47	Bobby Labonte	JTG Daugherty Racing	Toyota	264	18
27	17	9	Marcos Ambrose	Richard Petty Motorsports	Ford	263	17
28	40	38	David Gilliland	Front Row Motorsports	Ford	263	16
29	26	83	Landon Cassill	BK Racing	Toyota	262	15
30	39	32	T. J. Bell	FAS Lane Racing	Ford	261	-
31	38	93	Travis Kvapil	BK Racing	Toyota	259	13
32	30	51	Kurt Busch	Phoenix Racing	Chevrolet	245	12
33	42	36	Dave Blaney	Tommy Baldwin Racing	Chevrolet	199	11
34	7	78	Regan Smith	Furniture Row Racing	Chevrolet	197	10
35	19	24	Jeff Gordon	Hendrick Motorsports	Chevrolet	190	9
36	27	13	Casey Mears	Germain Racing	Ford	146	8
37	36	33	Cole Whitt	Circle Sport	Chevrolet	70	-
38	43	26	Josh Wise	Front Row Motorsports	Ford	66	6
39	31	30	David Stremme	Inception Motorsports	Toyota	60	5
40	33	87	Joe Nemechek	NEMCO Motorsports	Toyota	52	-
41	25	95	Scott Speed	Leavine Family Racing	Ford	49	3
42	34	19	Mike Bliss	Humphrey-Smith Motorsports	Toyota	41	-
43	24	98	Michael McDowell	Phil Parsons Racing	Ford	38	1

== Standings after the race ==
Drivers' Championship standings

Pos	Driver	Points
1	Brad Keselowski	2,056
2	Jimmie Johnson	2,053
3	Tony Stewart	2,048
4	Denny Hamlin	2,041
5	Kasey Kahne	2,041
6	Clint Bowyer	2,041
7	Dale Earnhardt Jr.	2,039
8	Greg Biffle	2,037
9	Martin Truex Jr.	2,035
10	Kevin Harvick	2,032
11	Matt Kenseth	2,030
12	Jeff Gordon	2,009

Manufacturers' Championship standings

Pos	Manufacturer	Points
1	Chevrolet	179
2	Toyota	150
3	Ford	128
4	Dodge	115

- Note: Only the first twelve positions are included for the driver standings.

Previous race: 2012 Federated Auto Parts 400	Sprint Cup Series; 2012 season	Next race: 2012 Sylvania 300
