= 2015 Cheez-It 355 at The Glen =

Race details
- Race 22 of 36 in the 2015 NASCAR Sprint Cup Series
- Date: August 9, 2015
- Location: Watkins Glen International in Watkins Glen, New York
- Course: Permanent racing facility
- Course length: 2.45 miles (3.94 km)
- Distance: 90 laps, 220.5 mi (354.6 km)
- Weather: Clear blue skies with a temperature of 77 °F (25 °C); wind out of the north/northeast at 5 mph (8.0 km/h).
- Average speed: 91.420 mph (147.126 km/h)

Pole position
Driver	A. J. Allmendinger	JTG Daugherty Racing
- Time: 1:08.993

Most laps led
Driver	Kevin Harvick	Stewart–Haas Racing
- Laps: 29

Winner
No. 22	Joey Logano	Team Penske

Television in the United States
- Network: NBCSN
- Announcers: Rick Allen, Jeff Burton and Steve Letarte
- Nielsen ratings: 2.4/5 (Overnight); 2.5/5 (Final); 4.0 Million viewers

Radio in the United States
- Radio: MRN
- Booth announcers: Joe Moore, Jeff Striegle and Rusty Wallace
- Turn announcers: Dave Moody (1 & Esses), Mike Bagley (Backstraight, Inner Loop & 5) and Kurt Becker (10 & 11)

The 2015 Cheez-It 355 at The Glen was a NASCAR Sprint Cup Series race held on August 9, 2015 at Watkins Glen International in Watkins Glen, New York. Contested over 90 laps on the 2.45 mile (3.94 km) road course, it was the 22nd race of the 2015 NASCAR Sprint Cup Series season. Joey Logano won the race, his second of the season. Kyle Busch finished second. Kevin Harvick finished third. Matt Kenseth and Kurt Busch rounded out the top five.

A. J. Allmendinger won the pole for the race and led 21 laps on his way to a 24th-place finish. Kevin Harvick lead a race high of 29 laps on his way to a third-place finish. The race had eight lead changes among eight different drivers, five cautions for 16 laps and one red flag for nine minutes and three seconds.

This was the tenth career victory for Joey Logano, second of the season, first at Watkins Glen and first at the track for Team Penske. The win brought Logano to within 42–points of Kevin Harvick in the points standings. Despite being the winning manufacturer, Ford left Watkins Glen trailing Chevrolet by 70–points in the manufacturer standings.

The Cheez-It 355 at The Glen was carried by NBC Sports on the cable/satellite NBCSN network for the American television audience. The radio broadcast for the race was carried by the Motor Racing Network and Sirius XM NASCAR Radio.

== Report ==
=== Background ===
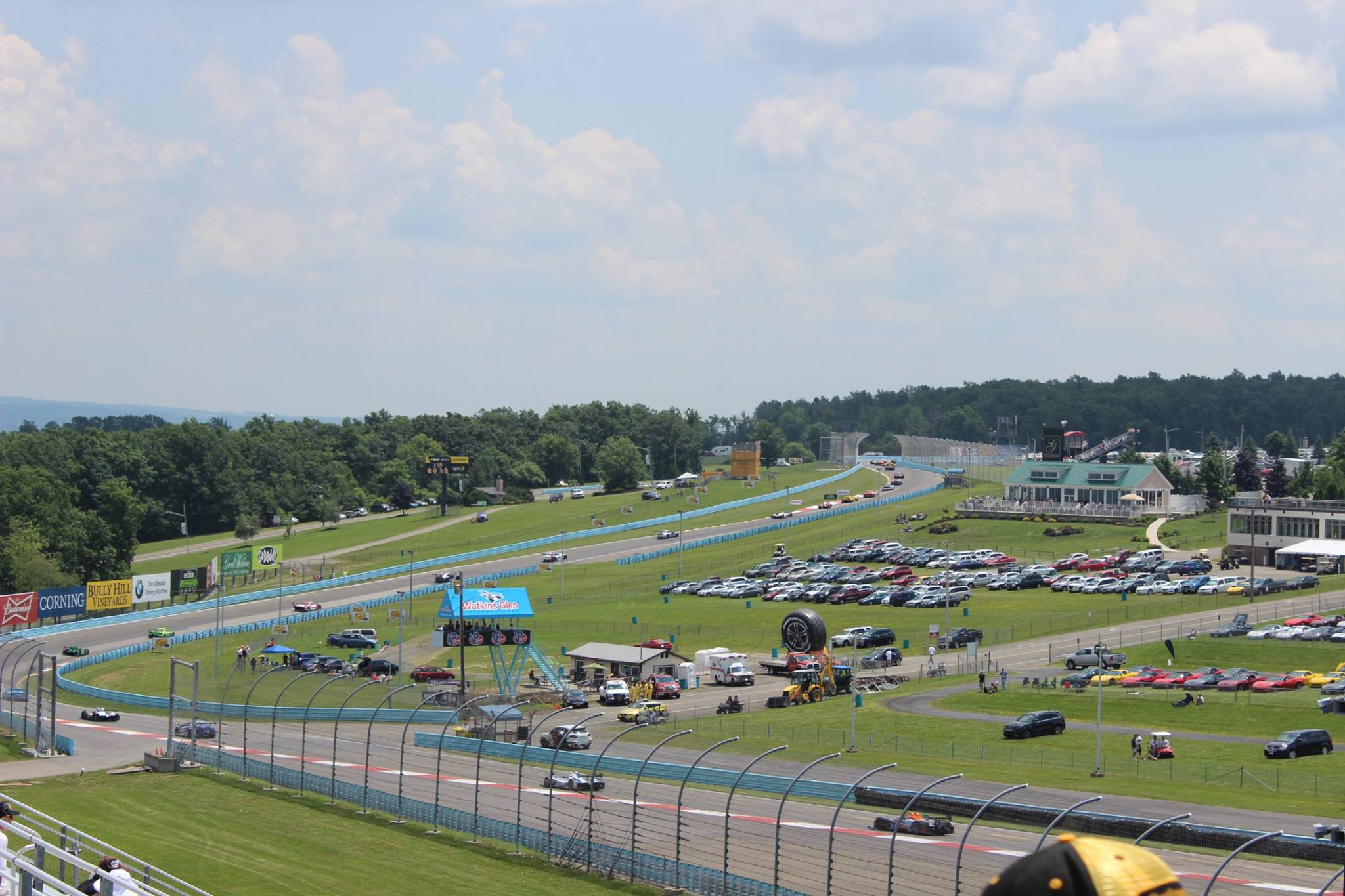
Watkins Glen International, the track where the race was held.

Watkins Glen International, nicknamed "The Glen", is an automobile race track located in Watkins Glen, New York, at the southern tip of Seneca Lake. Kevin Harvick entered Watkins Glen with a 46–point lead over Joey Logano. Dale Earnhardt Jr. entered 63 back. Jimmie Johnson entered 67 back. Martin Truex Jr. entered 86 back.

==== Entry list ====
The entry list for the Cheez-It 355 at The Glen was released on Monday, August 3 at 9:00 a.m. Eastern time. Forty-four cars were entered for the race. All but the No. 95 Leavine Family Racing Ford, driven by Michael McDowell, were entered the previous week's race at Pocono. The three driver changes for this race were Chris Buescher, making his sixth Sprint Cup Series start and first since Talladega in May, Boris Said – attempting to start the race in the No. 32 Go FAS Racing Ford – and T. J. Bell – making his first Cup Series start since the 2012 season – driving the No. 62 Premium Motorsports Chevrolet.

No.	Driver	Team	Manufacturer
1	Jamie McMurray	Chip Ganassi Racing	Chevrolet
2	Brad Keselowski (PC3)	Team Penske	Ford
3	Austin Dillon	Richard Childress Racing	Chevrolet
4	Kevin Harvick (PC1)	Stewart–Haas Racing	Chevrolet
5	Kasey Kahne	Hendrick Motorsports	Chevrolet
6	Trevor Bayne	Roush Fenway Racing	Ford
7	Alex Bowman	Tommy Baldwin Racing	Chevrolet
9	Sam Hornish Jr.	Richard Petty Motorsports	Ford
10	Danica Patrick	Stewart–Haas Racing	Chevrolet
11	Denny Hamlin	Joe Gibbs Racing	Toyota
13	Casey Mears	Germain Racing	Chevrolet
14	Tony Stewart (PC4)	Stewart–Haas Racing	Chevrolet
15	Clint Bowyer	Michael Waltrip Racing	Toyota
16	Greg Biffle	Roush Fenway Racing	Ford
17	Ricky Stenhouse Jr.	Roush Fenway Racing	Ford
18	Kyle Busch	Joe Gibbs Racing	Toyota
19	Carl Edwards	Joe Gibbs Racing	Toyota
20	Matt Kenseth (PC6)	Joe Gibbs Racing	Toyota
22	Joey Logano	Team Penske	Ford
23	J. J. Yeley (i)	BK Racing	Toyota
24	Jeff Gordon (PC7)	Hendrick Motorsports	Chevrolet
26	Jeb Burton (R)	BK Racing	Toyota
27	Paul Menard	Richard Childress Racing	Chevrolet
31	Ryan Newman	Richard Childress Racing	Chevrolet
32	Boris Said (i)	Go FAS Racing	Ford
33	Alex Kennedy (R)	Hillman-Circle Sport LLC	Chevrolet
34	Chris Buescher (i)	Front Row Motorsports	Ford
35	Cole Whitt	Front Row Motorsports	Ford
38	David Gilliland	Front Row Motorsports	Ford
40	Landon Cassill (i)	Hillman-Circle Sport LLC	Chevrolet
41	Kurt Busch (PC5)	Stewart–Haas Racing	Chevrolet
42	Kyle Larson	Chip Ganassi Racing	Chevrolet
43	Aric Almirola	Richard Petty Motorsports	Ford
46	Michael Annett	HScott Motorsports	Chevrolet
47	A. J. Allmendinger	JTG Daugherty Racing	Chevrolet
48	Jimmie Johnson (PC2)	Hendrick Motorsports	Chevrolet
51	Justin Allgaier	HScott Motorsports	Chevrolet
55	David Ragan	Michael Waltrip Racing	Toyota
62	T. J. Bell (i)	Premium Motorsports	Chevrolet
78	Martin Truex Jr.	Furniture Row Racing	Chevrolet
83	Matt DiBenedetto (R)	BK Racing	Toyota
88	Dale Earnhardt Jr.	Hendrick Motorsports	Chevrolet
95	Michael McDowell	Leavine Family Racing	Ford
98	Timmy Hill (i)	Premium Motorsports	Ford
Official initial entry list
Official final entry list

Key	Meaning
(R)	Rookie
(i)	Ineligible for points
(PC#)	Past champions provisional

== Practice ==
=== First practice ===
Clint Bowyer was the fastest in the first practice session with a time of 1:09.412 and a speed of 127.067 mph (204.495 km/h).

Pos	No.	Driver	Team	Manufacturer	Time	Speed
1	15	Clint Bowyer	Michael Waltrip Racing	Toyota	1:09.412	127.067
2	47	A. J. Allmendinger	JTG Daugherty Racing	Chevrolet	1:09.503	126.901
3	48	Jimmie Johnson	Hendrick Motorsports	Chevrolet	1:09.923	126.139
Official first practice results

=== Final practice ===
Jeff Gordon was the fastest in the final practice session with a time of 1:09.267 and a speed of 127.333 mph (204.923 km/h).

Pos	No.	Driver	Team	Manufacturer	Time	Speed
1	24	Jeff Gordon	Hendrick Motorsports	Chevrolet	1:09.267	127.333
2	42	Kyle Larson	Chip Ganassi Racing	Chevrolet	1:09.422	127.049
3	16	Greg Biffle	Roush Fenway Racing	Ford	1:09.456	126.987
Official final practice results

== Qualifying ==
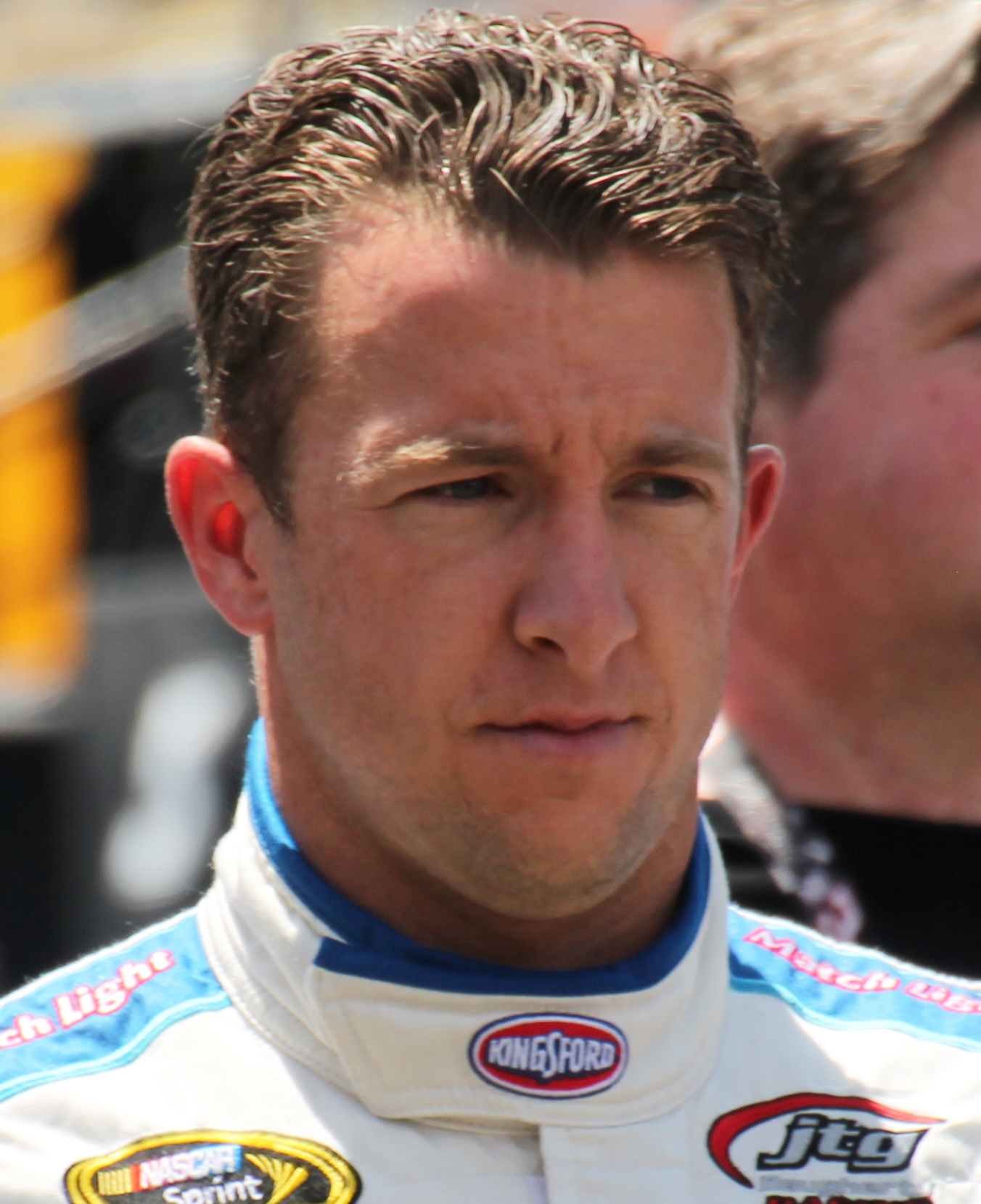
A. J. Allmendinger, seen here at Sonoma Raceway, scored the pole for the race.

A. J. Allmendinger won the pole with a time of 1:08.993 and a speed of 127.839 mph (205.737 km/h). "Track position is critical around here," Allmendinger said. "Everybody is so close, it's tough to pass, you start beating and banging on each other, and your fenders get torn up. So this is a good start, and strategy plays a lot in this race - fuel mileage and everything. I don’t know if I’ll sleep any better tonight, but I’ll be ready for Sunday." "That was all I had and I’m content with it," said Tony Stewart after qualifying third for his first race at Watkins Glen since 2012. "Three good weeks of qualifying make me happy, at three different tracks with three different packages. That's an awesome way to start the weekend." "Our laps weren’t great, we were just OK," said Kyle Busch after qualifying eighth. "We were way too loose and didn’t have the balance we needed to get the speed out of it for some of the corners."

=== Qualifying results ===
Pos	No.	Driver	Team	Manufacturer	R1	R2
1	47	A. J. Allmendinger	JTG Daugherty Racing	Chevrolet	1:09.110	1:08.993
2	78	Martin Truex Jr.	Furniture Row Racing	Chevrolet	1:09.358	1:09.139
3	14	Tony Stewart	Stewart–Haas Racing	Chevrolet	1:09.390	1:09.187
4	4	Kevin Harvick	Stewart–Haas Racing	Chevrolet	1:09.296	1:09.222
5	24	Jeff Gordon	Hendrick Motorsports	Chevrolet	1:09.357	1:09.350
6	42	Kyle Larson	Chip Ganassi Racing	Chevrolet	1:09.494	1:09.477
7	88	Dale Earnhardt Jr.	Hendrick Motorsports	Chevrolet	1:09.497	1:09.497
8	18	Kyle Busch	Joe Gibbs Racing	Toyota	1:09.442	1:09.521
9	48	Jimmie Johnson	Hendrick Motorsports	Chevrolet	1:09.330	1:09.543
10	3	Austin Dillon	Richard Childress Racing	Chevrolet	1:09.541	1:09.565
11	2	Brad Keselowski	Team Penske	Ford	1:09.474	1:09.938
12	51	Justin Allgaier	HScott Motorsports	Chevrolet	1:09.519	1:10.011
13	11	Denny Hamlin	Joe Gibbs Racing	Toyota	1:09.544	—
14	41	Kurt Busch	Stewart–Haas Racing	Chevrolet	1:09.564	—
15	19	Carl Edwards	Joe Gibbs Racing	Toyota	1:09.626	—
16	22	Joey Logano	Team Penske	Ford	1:09.663	—
17	1	Jamie McMurray	Chip Ganassi Racing	Chevrolet	1:09.671	—
18	15	Clint Bowyer	Michael Waltrip Racing	Toyota	1:09.677	—
19	55	David Ragan	Michael Waltrip Racing	Toyota	1:09.705	—
20	31	Ryan Newman	Richard Childress Racing	Chevrolet	1:09.730	—
21	43	Aric Almirola	Richard Petty Motorsports	Ford	1:09.949	—
22	10	Danica Patrick	Stewart–Haas Racing	Chevrolet	1:09.962	—
23	5	Kasey Kahne	Hendrick Motorsports	Chevrolet	1:09.978	—
24	9	Sam Hornish Jr.	Richard Petty Motorsports	Ford	1:10.003	—
25	16	Greg Biffle	Roush Fenway Racing	Ford	1:10.043	—
26	20	Matt Kenseth	Joe Gibbs Racing	Toyota	1:10.061	—
27	83	Matt DiBenedetto (R)	BK Racing	Toyota	1:10.084	—
28	27	Paul Menard	Richard Childress Racing	Chevrolet	1:10.122	—
29	13	Casey Mears	Germain Racing	Chevrolet	1:10.125	—
30	17	Ricky Stenhouse Jr.	Roush Fenway Racing	Ford	1:10.214	—
31	95	Michael McDowell	Leavine Family Racing	Ford	1:10.238	—
32	34	Chris Buescher (i)	Front Row Motorsports	Ford	1:10.306	—
33	35	Cole Whitt	Front Row Motorsports	Ford	1:10.438	—
34	6	Trevor Bayne	Roush Fenway Racing	Ford	1:10.705	—
35	33	Alex Kennedy (R)	Hillman-Circle Sport LLC	Chevrolet	1:10.778	—
36	40	Landon Cassill (i)	Hillman-Circle Sport LLC	Chevrolet	1:11.090	—
37	38	David Gilliland	Front Row Motorsports	Ford	1:11.114	—
38	32	Boris Said (i)	Go FAS Racing	Ford	1:11.157	—
39	7	Alex Bowman	Tommy Baldwin Racing	Chevrolet	1:11.167	—
40	46	Michael Annett	HScott Motorsports	Chevrolet	1:11.220	—
41	26	Jeb Burton (R)	BK Racing	Toyota	1:11.572	—
42	23	J. J. Yeley (i)	BK Racing	Toyota	1:11.891	—
43	98	Timmy Hill (i)	Premium Motorsports	Ford	1:12.744	—
Failed to qualify
44	62	T. J. Bell (i)	Premium Motorsports	Chevrolet	1:11.355	—
Official qualifying results

== Race ==
=== First half ===
==== Start ====
The race was scheduled to start at 2:18 p.m., but started at 2:23 p.m. when A. J. Allmendinger led the field to the green flag. On lap 3, Jimmie Johnson overshot the entrance to the inner loop and was forced to come to a complete stop before continuing. As a result, he fell from ninth to 22nd. On lap 10, Aric Almirola got loose and spun out in turn 1. Paul Menard, who took the outside line, made minor contact with him. Both drivers continued on and the race remained green. Outside polesitter Martin Truex Jr. passed Allmendinger in turn 11 to take the lead on lap 22. That same lap, Kevin Harvick climbed his way to second, putting Allmendinger in third-place. Jeff Gordon pitted from eighth on lap 24. Debris on the backstretch brought out the first caution of the race on lap 26. The debris came from Greg Biffle's car. Cole Whitt opted not to pit and assumed the lead Denny Hamlin and Jimmie Johnson were tagged for speeding on pit road and restarted the race from the tail-end of the field.

==== Second quarter ====
The race restarted on lap 29. Brad Keselowski passed Whitt in turn 1 to take the lead. On the same lap, the hood of Denny Hamlin's car flew up. He didn't pit that lap and was black flagged for not pitting to put the hood down. As he pulled off pit road, another piece of debris flew off his car and landed in the esses. This brought out the second caution of the race on lap 32.

The race restarted on lap 36. Justin Allgaier got loose and spun out exiting turn 1, but the race remained green. Kyle Larson got loose and made contact with Austin Dillon on lap 42. Both went spinning in turn, but the race remained green. Debris on the backstretch brought out the third caution of the race on lap 46.

=== Second half ===
==== Halfway ====
The race restarted on lap 50. An accordion wreck on the front stretch brought out the fourth caution of the race. The amount of fluid on the front stretch brought out the red flag. Allmendinger's car lost power and came to a stop past turn 10. After nine minutes and three seconds, the red flag was withdrawn and the race continued under caution.

The race restarted on lap 55. Kyle Busch tapped Keselowski going into turn 10 and took the lead on lap 57. The fifth caution of the race flew on lap 57 when Tony Stewart came to a stop just before reaching the inner loop. He jumped onto the radio and said that something broke in the drive-train. In an unrelated incident, Johnson spun out in turn 5. Matt Kenseth opted not to pit and assumed the lead, dropping Busch back to 21st.

The race restarted on lap 61. Harvick passed Kenseth going up turn 2 to take the lead. Martin Truex Jr. got out of the groove in turn 11 and made an unscheduled stop with 22 laps to go. The culprit was a flat left-front tire.

==== Final ten laps ====
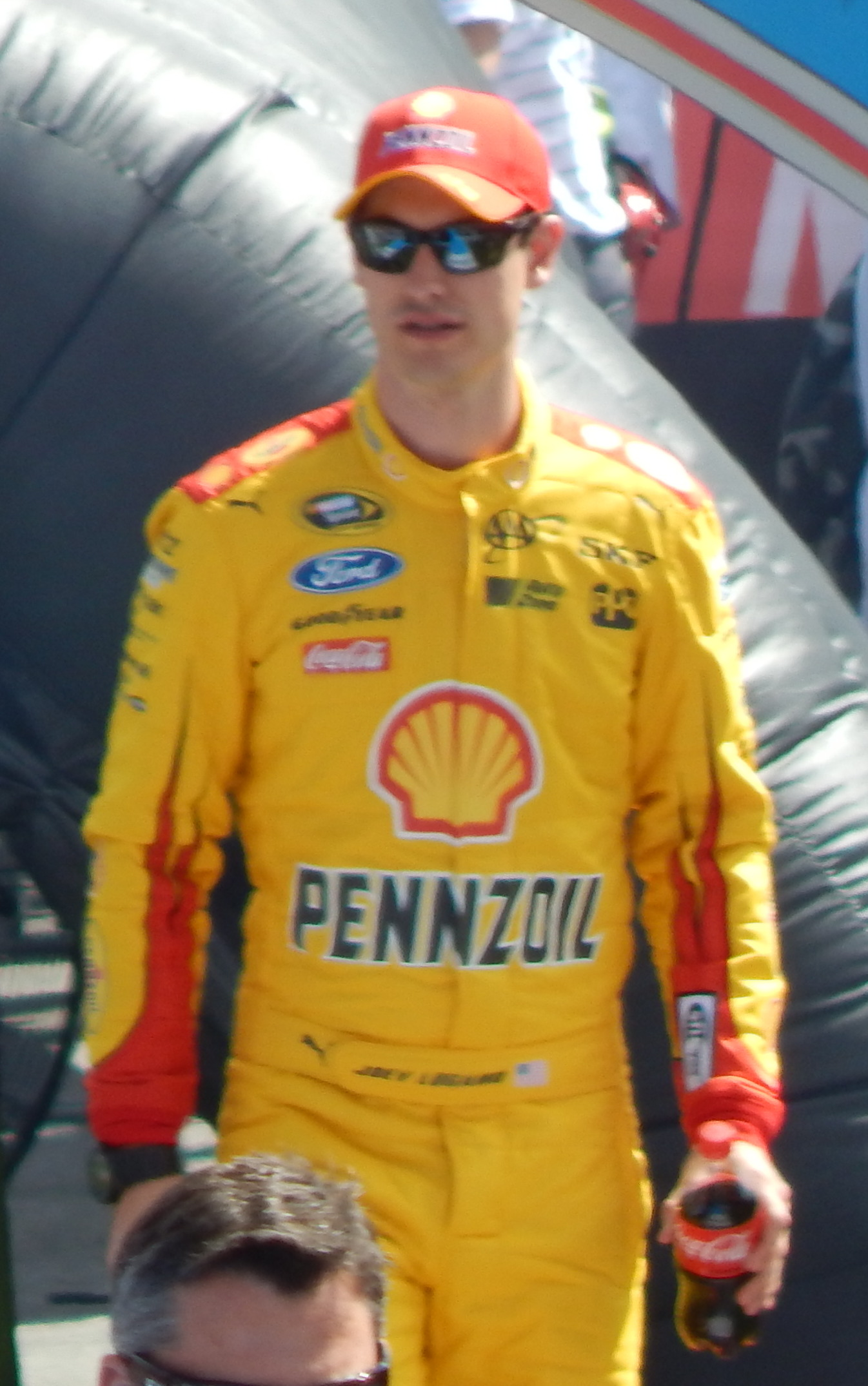
Joey Logano, seen here at the 2015 Daytona 500, scored his tenth career victory at Watkins Glen International.

Harvick was still leading with ten laps to go with no guarantee of making the finish on his fuel load. Allmendinger was the first to run out as he pitted from the top ten with seven laps to go. Harvick ran out of fuel on the final lap and was passed by Logano going into turn 11 who took the checkered flag.

== Post-race ==
=== Driver comments ===
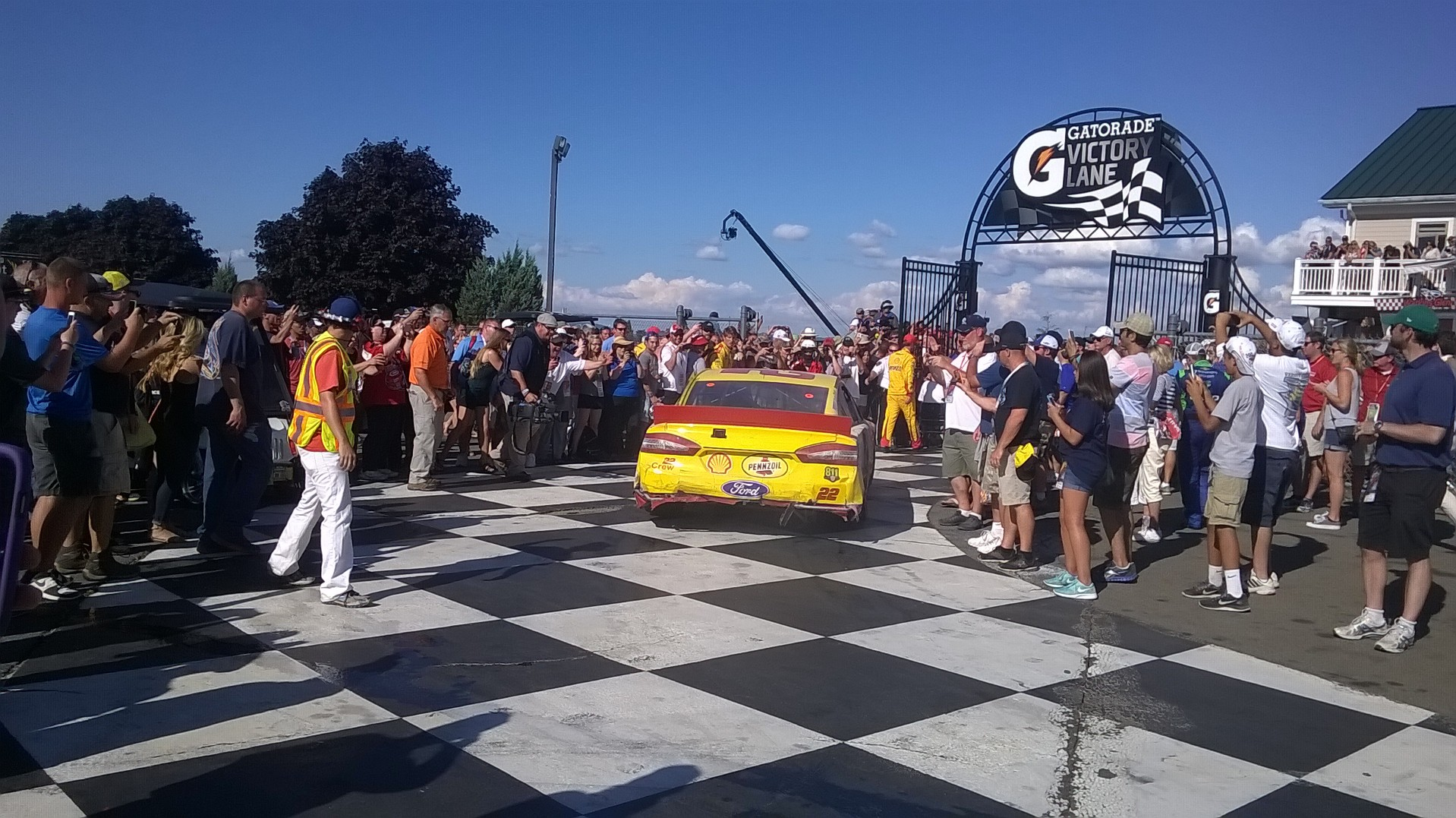
Logano pulls into Victory Lane after winning the race.

“I was running down Harvick there for a little bit and once I got close to him he started to pick up his pace a little bit, which was good because I needed him to run out of gas,” Logano said. “I started to catch him a little bit and I drove into one too hard and started to wheel hop. I just about lost it and at that point you just hope he runs out of gas, which he did in the last corner. It makes up for last week. We lost the race last week the same way, so it makes up for it to get it this week.” “I had a chance,” Kyle Busch said after finishing second. “I could’ve went up there, I could’ve raced the 22, I could’ve passed him. I felt like I was better than he was, but my crew chief called in scared on the fuel situation from last week and I don’t blame him. We definitely didn’t want to run out again. We wanted to make sure we could be there at the end.” “We ran pretty good with just the way the fuel strategy worked out, we had to save a lot battling with Kevin (Harvick)," Kenseth said. "I thought (Joey Logano) and (Kyle Busch) were going to go right by me and we actually had a lot of car left."

== Race results ==
Pos	No.	Driver	Team	Manufacturer	Laps	Points
1	22	Joey Logano	Team Penske	Ford	90	47
2	18	Kyle Busch	Joe Gibbs Racing	Toyota	90	43
3	4	Kevin Harvick	Stewart–Haas Racing	Chevrolet	90	43
4	20	Matt Kenseth	Joe Gibbs Racing	Toyota	90	40
5	41	Kurt Busch	Stewart–Haas Racing	Chevrolet	90	39
6	15	Clint Bowyer	Michael Waltrip Racing	Toyota	90	38
7	2	Brad Keselowski	Team Penske	Ford	90	38
8	19	Carl Edwards	Joe Gibbs Racing	Toyota	90	36
9	9	Sam Hornish Jr.	Richard Petty Motorsports	Ford	90	35
10	48	Jimmie Johnson	Hendrick Motorsports	Chevrolet	90	34
11	88	Dale Earnhardt Jr.	Hendrick Motorsports	Chevrolet	90	33
12	42	Kyle Larson	Chip Ganassi Racing	Chevrolet	90	32
13	27	Paul Menard	Richard Childress Racing	Chevrolet	90	31
14	16	Greg Biffle	Roush Fenway Racing	Ford	90	30
15	31	Ryan Newman	Richard Childress Racing	Chevrolet	90	29
16	43	Aric Almirola	Richard Petty Motorsports	Ford	90	28
17	10	Danica Patrick	Stewart–Haas Racing	Chevrolet	90	27
18	13	Casey Mears	Germain Racing	Chevrolet	90	26
19	51	Justin Allgaier	HScott Motorsports	Chevrolet	90	25
20	95	Michael McDowell	Leavine Family Racing	Ford	90	24
21	35	Cole Whitt	Front Row Motorsports	Ford	90	24
22	6	Trevor Bayne	Roush Fenway Racing	Ford	90	22
23	55	David Ragan	Michael Waltrip Racing	Toyota	90	21
24	47	A. J. Allmendinger	JTG Daugherty Racing	Chevrolet	90	21
25	78	Martin Truex Jr.	Furniture Row Racing	Chevrolet	90	20
26	83	Matt DiBenedetto (R)	BK Racing	Toyota	90	18
27	11	Denny Hamlin	Joe Gibbs Racing	Toyota	90	17
28	33	Alex Kennedy (R)	Hillman-Circle Sport LLC	Chevrolet	90	16
29	7	Alex Bowman	Tommy Baldwin Racing	Chevrolet	90	15
30	23	J. J. Yeley (i)	BK Racing	Toyota	90	0
31	46	Michael Annett	HScott Motorsports	Chevrolet	90	13
32	32	Boris Said (i)	Go FAS Racing	Ford	89	0
33	38	David Gilliland	Front Row Motorsports	Ford	89	11
34	17	Ricky Stenhouse Jr.	Roush Fenway Racing	Ford	89	10
35	40	Landon Cassill (i)	Hillman-Circle Sport LLC	Chevrolet	89	0
36	3	Austin Dillon	Richard Childress Racing	Chevrolet	89	8
37	34	Chris Buescher (i)	Front Row Motorsports	Ford	88	0
38	98	Timmy Hill (i)	Premium Motorsports	Ford	88	0
39	26	Jeb Burton (R)	BK Racing	Toyota	88	5
40	1	Jamie McMurray	Chip Ganassi Racing	Chevrolet	86	4
41	24	Jeff Gordon	Hendrick Motorsports	Chevrolet	86	3
42	5	Kasey Kahne	Hendrick Motorsports	Chevrolet	78	2
43	14	Tony Stewart	Stewart–Haas Racing	Chevrolet	56	1
Official Cheez-It 355 at The Glen results

=== Race statistics ===
- 8 lead changes among 8 different drivers
- 5 cautions for 16 laps; 1 red flag for 9 minutes, 3 seconds
- Time of race: 2 hours, 24 minute, 43 seconds
- Average speed: 91.420 mph (147.126 km/h)
- Joey Logano took home $263,723 in winnings

Lap Leaders
Laps	Leader
1-20	A. J. Allmendinger
21-25	Martin Truex Jr.
26	A. J. Allmendinger
27-28	Cole Whitt
29-55	Brad Keselowski
56-58	Kyle Busch
59-60	Matt Kenseth
61-89	Kevin Harvick
90	Joey Logano

Total laps led
Leader	Laps
Kevin Harvick	29
Brad Keselowski	27
A. J. Allmendinger	21
Martin Truex Jr.	5
Kyle Busch	3
Matt Kenseth	2
Cole Whitt	2
Joey Logano	1

==== Race awards ====
- Coors Light Pole Award: A. J. Allmendinger (1:08.993, 127.839 mph (205.737 km/h))
- 3M Lap Leader: Kevin Harvick (29 laps)
- American Ethanol Green Flag Restart Award: Brad Keselowski
- Duralast Brakes "Bake In The Race" Award: Kevin Harvick
- Freescale "Wide Open": Kurt Busch
- Ingersoll Rand Power Move: Aric Almirola (4 positions)
- MAHLE Clevite Engine Builder of the Race: Hendrick Engines #4
- Mobil 1 Driver of the Race: Kevin Harvick (132.7 driver rating)
- Moog Steering and Suspension Problem Solver of The Race: Clint Bowyer (crew chief Billy Scott (–0.096 seconds))
- NASCAR Sprint Cup Leader Bonus: No winner: rolls over to $190,000 at next event
- Sherwin-Williams Fastest Lap: A. J. Allmendinger (Lap 5, 1:11.073, 124.098 mph (199.716 km/h))
- Sunoco Rookie of The Race: Matt DiBenedetto

== Media ==
=== Television ===
NBC Sports covered the race on the television side. Rick Allen, Jeff Burton and Steve Letarte had the call in the booth for the race. Dave Burns, Mike Massaro, Marty Snider and Kelli Stavast handled pit road on the television side.

NBCSN
Booth announcers	Pit reporters
Lap-by-lap: Rick Allen; Color-commentator: Jeff Burton; Color-commentator: Steve Letarte	Dave Burns; Mike Massaro; Marty Snider; Kelli Stavast

=== Radio ===
MRN had the radio call for the race, which was simulcast on Sirius XM NASCAR Radio. Joe Moore, Jeff Striegle and two–time Watkins Glen winner Rusty Wallace called the race from the booth when the field was racing down the front stretch. Dave Moody called the race from a scaffold outside of the esses when the field was racing through turn 1 and up the esses of turns 2, 3 and 4. Mike Bagley called the race from a scaffold outside of the outer loop when the field was racing up the back straight, through the inner loop and down turn 5. Kurt Becker called the race from a spotter stand outside of the short chute when the field was racing down the short chute and rounding turns 10 and 11. Winston Kelley, Alex Hayden and Steve Post worked pit road for MRN.

MRN
Booth announcers	Turn announcers	Pit reporters
Lead announcer: Joe Moore; Announcer: Jeff Striegle; Announcer: Rusty Wallace	Turn 1, Esses: Dave Moody; Back Straight, Inner Loop, Turn 5: Mike Bagley; Short Chute, Turns 10 & 11: Kurt Becker	Winston Kelley; Alex Hayden; Steve Post

== Standings after the race ==
Drivers' Championship standings

	Pos	Driver	Points
	1	Kevin Harvick	823
	2	Joey Logano	781 (–42)
	3	Dale Earnhardt Jr.	750 (–73)
	4	Jimmie Johnson	747 (–76)
1	5	Brad Keselowski	719 (–104)
1	6	Martin Truex Jr.	713 (–110)
	7	Matt Kenseth	703 (–120)
1	8	Kurt Busch	659 (–164)
1	9	Jamie McMurray	635 (–188)
1	10	Denny Hamlin	631 (–192)
1	11	Paul Menard	622 (–201)
2	12	Jeff Gordon	620 (–203)
	13	Ryan Newman	613 (–210)
	14	Clint Bowyer	612 (–211)
1	15	Carl Edwards	589 (–234)
1	16	Aric Almirola	562 (–261)

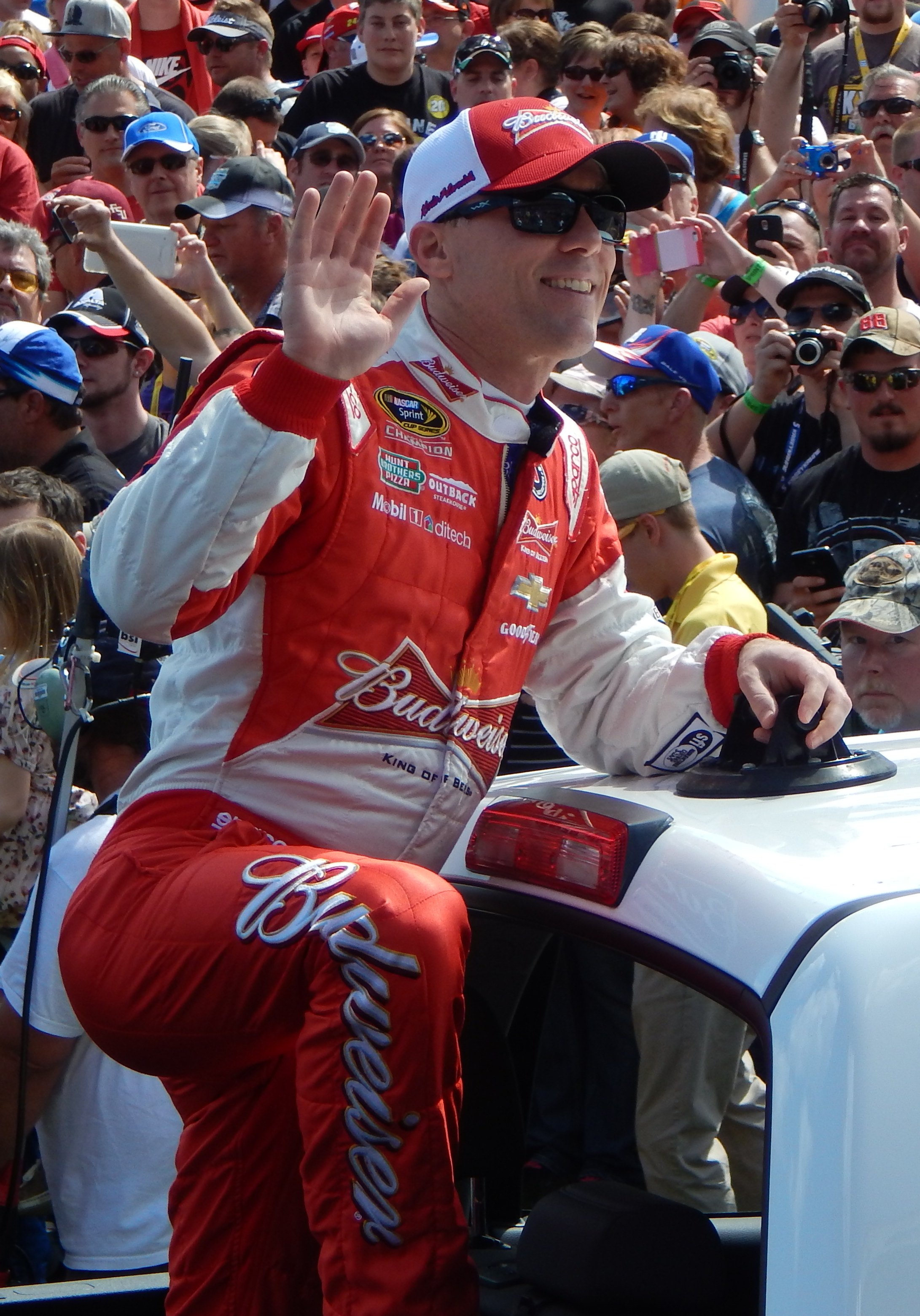
Kevin Harvick left Watkins Glen with a 42–point lead over Joey Logano.

Manufacturers' Championship standings

Pos	Manufacturer	Points
1	Chevrolet	981
2	Ford	911 (–70)
3	Toyota	906 (–75)

- Note: Only the first sixteen positions are included for the driver standings.

Previous race: 2015 Windows 10 400	Sprint Cup Series; 2015 season	Next race: 2015 Pure Michigan 400
