= T. J. Bell =

American racing driver (born 1980)

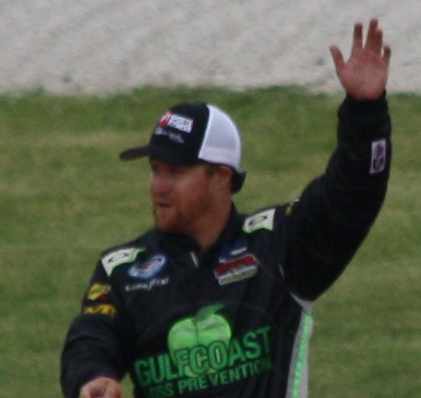
- Bell at Road America in 2012
- Born: Timothy Peter Bell Jr. August 25, 1980 (age 46); Sparks, Nevada, U.S.
- Achievements: 1989–1995 Nevada State Go-Kart Champion
- Awards: 2004 ARCA Re/MAX Series Rookie of the Year

NASCAR Cup Series career
- 11 races run over 3 years
- 2015 position: 49th
- Best finish: 45th (2011)
- First race: 2011 Showtime Southern 500 (Darlington)
- Last race: 2015 Bojangles' Southern 500 (Darlington)
Wins	Top tens	Poles
0	0	0

NASCAR O'Reilly Auto Parts Series career
- 69 races run over 7 years
- 2016 position: 39th
- Best finish: 25th (2012)
- First race: 2005 Ameriquest 300 (Fontana)
- Last race: 2016 Food City 300 (Bristol)
Wins	Top tens	Poles
0	0	0

NASCAR FedEx Freight Truck Series career
- 121 races run over 15 years
- 2020 position: 71st
- Best finish: 15th (2009)
- First race: 2003 Lucas Oil 250 (Mesa Marin)
- Last race: 2020 Baptist Health 200 (Homestead)
Wins	Top tens	Poles
0	13	0

ARCA Menards Series career
- 41 races run over 3 years
- Best finish: 3rd (2004)
- First race: 2004 Advance Discount Auto Parts 200 (Daytona)
- Last race: 2006 Hantz Group 200 (Michigan)
Wins	Top tens	Poles
0	20	0
- Statistics up to date as of November 11, 2020.

Timothy Peter "T. J." Bell Jr. (born August 25, 1980) is an American professional stock car racing driver. He has primarily competed in NASCAR competition, driving in all three national touring series. He last competed part-time in the NASCAR Gander RV & Outdoors Truck Series, driving the No. 83 Chevrolet Silverado for CMI Motorsports and the No. 40 Silverado for Niece Motorsports.

== Racing career ==
Bell began racing at the age of eight in go-karts and went on to win six consecutive championships in the state of Nevada. In 1997, he began racing in the SCCA F2000 Championship Series and won one out of the nine races he competed in. He soon moved up to the U.S. F2000 National Championship and was named the national spokesman for the Special Wish Foundation. In 2000, he joined the CART Toyota Atlantic Series, driving for Michael Shank Racing and posting five top-five finishes. After another tun in Toyota Atlantic, Bell joined the ASCARI factory team, participating in several endurance races for the team, including the 24 Hours of Daytona, 12 Hours of Sebring, and 24 Hours of LeMans.

In 2003, Bell switched to stock car racing and began racing in the Truck Series. He drove a total of nine races in the No. 86 Defiant Clothing Chevrolet Silverado for Team Racing, his best finish a twelfth at Dover International Speedway. He also drove three races in the No. 53 truck owned by Mary Ward, but did not finish higher than 23rd. The following season, he moved to the ARCA RE/MAX Series to drive for Powertech Motorsports. He finished third in points and was named Rookie of the Year. He made eighteen starts in ARCA in 2005 and returned to the Truck Series, finishing sixteenth at Kentucky Speedway in a one-race deal with Glynn Motorsports. In the summer of 2005, he was hired by DCT Motorsports to drive their No. 36 Pontiac, earning a best finish of 22nd in eight races.

Bell drove a limited schedule for Bobby Jones Racing in 2006 in the ARCA Series, as well as driving the No. 07 Green Light Racing truck in the Truck Series. In 2007, Bell signed to drive sixteen races for Roush Fenway Racing's No. 50 Ford F-150 in the Trucks in 2007. Despite driving in elite equipment, he had only one top-ten finish and ended the year 22nd in points. He finished out 2008 with TRG Motorsports when he replaced Andy Lally in the No. 7. Bell impressed many, scoring five top-tens for TRG before leaving to drive Red Horse Racing's No. 11 Toyota vacated by David Starr. In 2010, he drove the No. 50 for new team MAKE Motorsports, and will drive with them in 2011.

Bell made his Cup Series debut at the May Darlington race, driving the No. 50 Chevrolet for Joe Falk, a Virginia car dealer who owned LJ Racing from 1997 to 2000. The car finished 38th after the transmission gave out after 67 laps. Bell ran several more races later in the year, attempting a run for Rookie of the Year honors.

In 2012, Bell ran full-time in the Nationwide Series for MAKE Motorsports, in addition to making selected Sprint Cup Series starts for FAS Lane Racing. He also ran selected races in the Truck Series for JJC Racing. In early August MAKE Motorsports began skipping races due to a lack of funding.

Since 2012, Bell has been a journeyman in the Truck and Xfinity Series. He has raced for various teams like Niece Motorsports and CMI Motorsports at the Truck level and MBM Motorsports and Obaika Racing in the Xfinity tier.

Bell was the spotter for Corey LaJoie in the NASCAR Cup Series, along with spotting for various other drivers in NASCAR's lower series.

== Images ==
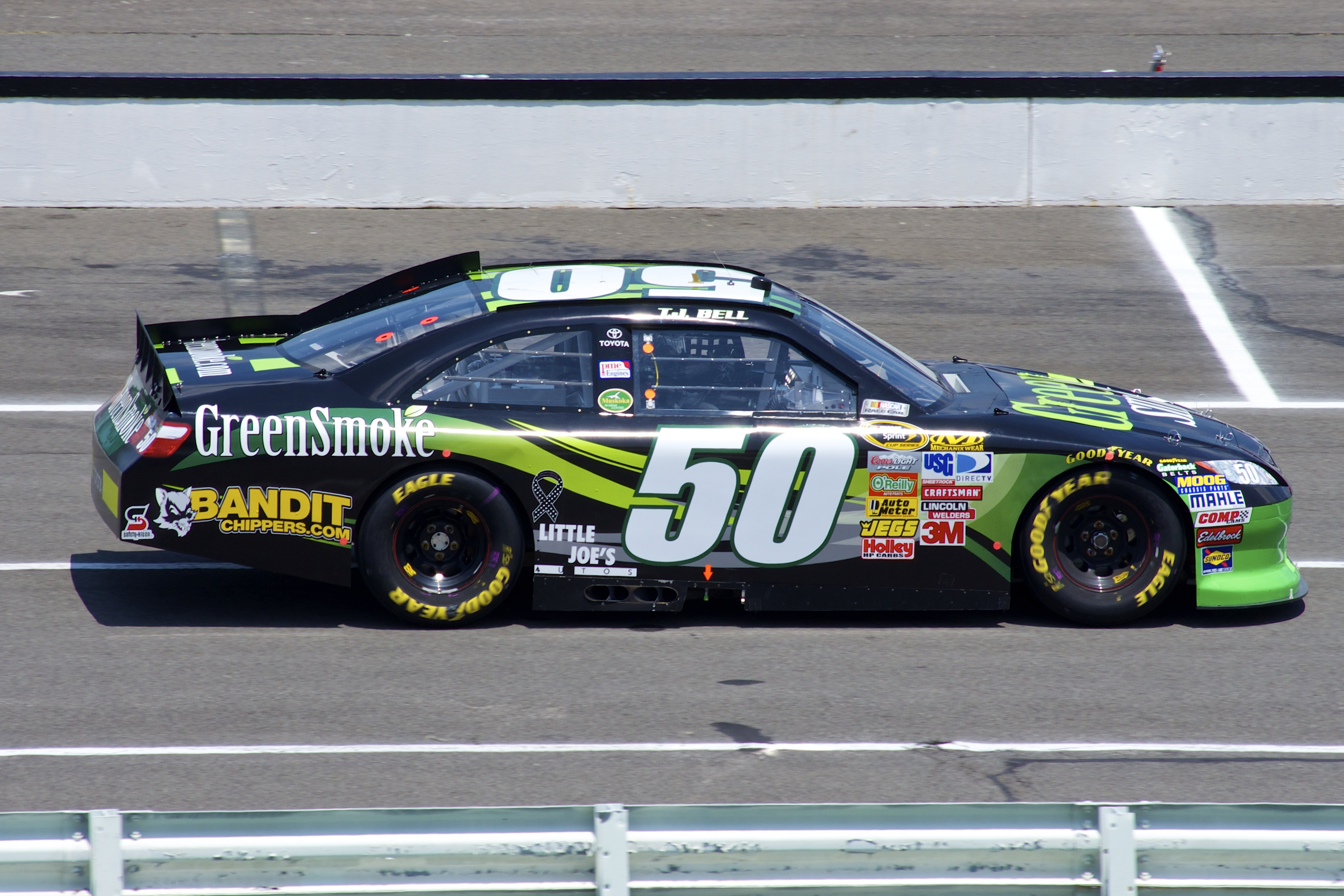
Bell's 2011 Sprint Cup Series car at Pocono

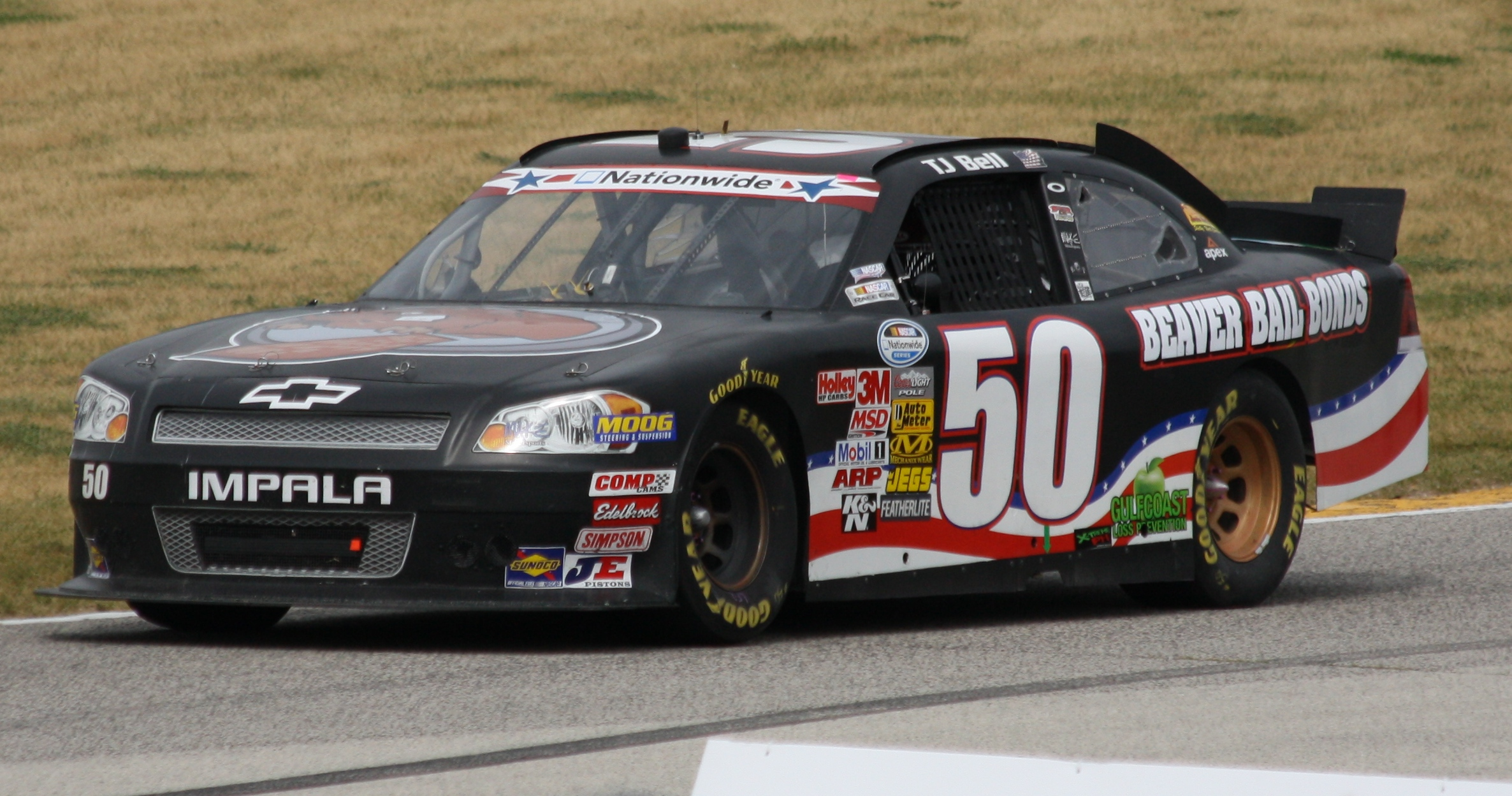
Bell at Road America in the Nationwide Series in 2012

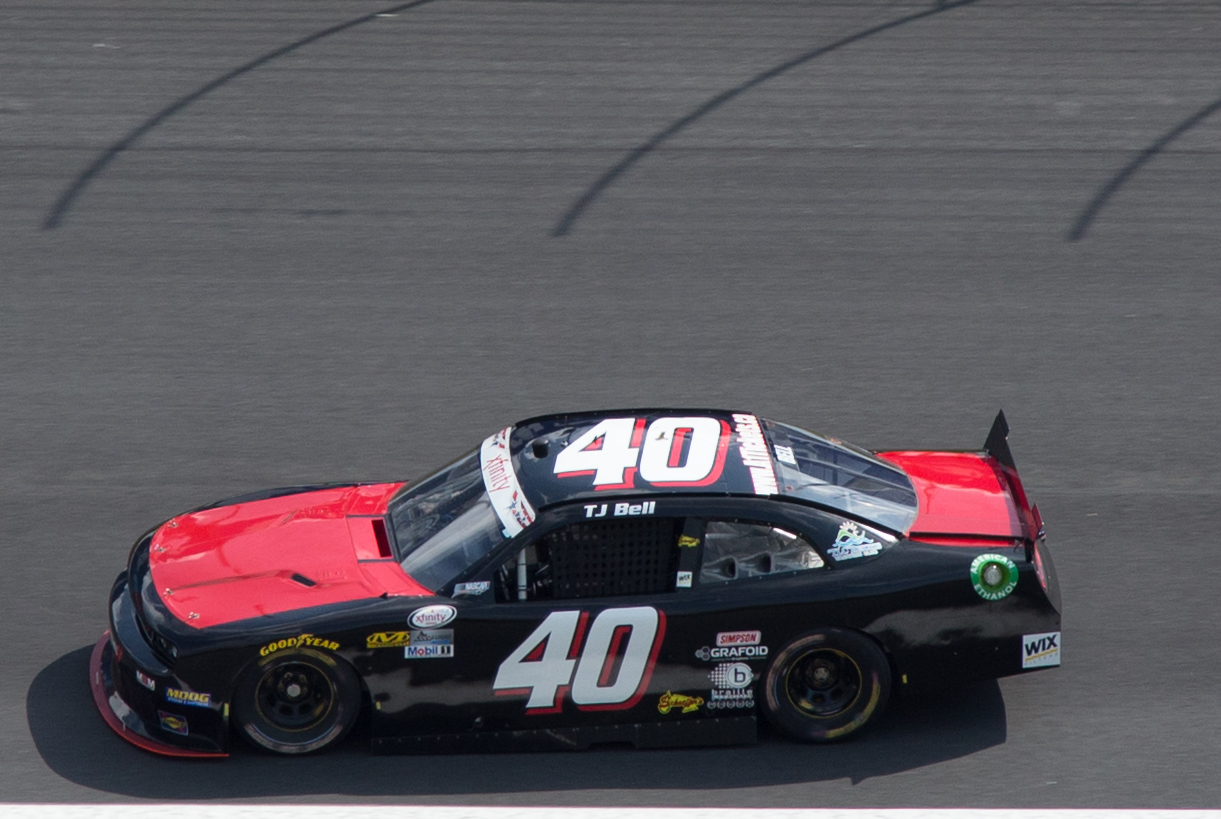
Bell at Charlotte Motor Speedway in the Xfinity Series in 2016

== Motorsports career results ==
=== NASCAR ===
(key) (Bold – Pole position awarded by qualifying time. Italics – Pole position earned by points standings or practice time. * – Most laps led.)

==== Sprint Cup Series ====
NASCAR Sprint Cup Series results
Year	Team	No.	Make	1	2	3	4	5	6	7	8	9	10	11	12	13	14	15	16	17	18	19	20	21	22	23	24	25	26	27	28	29	30	31	32	33	34	35	36	NSCC	Pts	Ref
2011	LTD Powersports	50	Toyota	DAY	PHO	LVS	BRI	CAL	MAR	TEX	TAL	RCH	DAR; 38	DOV	CLT; DNQ	KAN; DNQ	POC; 39	MCH	SON	DAY	KEN; DNQ	NHA																		45th	29	
2011	LTD Powersports	50	Chevy																				IND; 42	POC; DNQ	GLN; 37	MCH; DNQ	BRI; DNQ	ATL; DNQ	RCH; DNQ	CHI	NHA; DNQ	DOV	KAN	CLT						45th	29	
2011	TRG Motorsports	77	Ford																																TAL; DNQ	MAR	TEX	PHO		45th	29	
2011	FAS Lane Racing	32	Ford																																				HOM; 29	45th	29	
2012	FAS Lane Racing	32	Ford	DAY	PHO	LVS	BRI	CAL	MAR	TEX	KAN	RCH	TAL	DAR	CLT; 31	DOV	POC	MCH	SON	KEN	DAY	NHA	IND	POC	GLN	MCH; 33	BRI	ATL; 30	RCH	CHI; 30	NHA	DOV; 33	TAL	CLT	KAN	MAR	TEX	PHO	HOM	68th	0^{1}	
2015	Premium Motorsports	62	Chevy	DAY	ATL	LVS	PHO	CAL	MAR	TEX	BRI	RCH	TAL	KAN	CLT	DOV	POC	MCH	SON	DAY	KEN	NHA	IND	POC	GLN; DNQ	MCH	BRI													49th	7	
2015	Premium Motorsports	98	Ford																									DAR; 37	RCH	CHI	NHA	DOV	CLT	KAN	TAL	MAR	TEX	PHO	HOM	49th	7	

==== Xfinity Series ====
NASCAR Xfinity Series results
Year	Team	No.	Make	1	2	3	4	5	6	7	8	9	10	11	12	13	14	15	16	17	18	19	20	21	22	23	24	25	26	27	28	29	30	31	32	33	34	35	NXSC	Pts	Ref
2005	McGill Motorsports	36	Chevy	DAY	CAL	MXC	LVS	ATL	NSH	BRI	TEX	PHO	TAL	DAR	RCH	CLT	DOV	NSH	KEN	MLW	DAY	CHI	NHA	PPR	GTY	IRP	GLN	MCH	BRI	CAL; 38	RCH; 24	DOV; 22	KAN; 35	CLT; 34	MEM; 41	TEX; 34	PHO; 36	HOM	69th	517	
2011	JJC Racing	13	Dodge	DAY	PHO	LVS	BRI	CAL	TEX	TAL	NSH	RCH	DAR	DOV	IOW	CLT	CHI	MCH	ROA	DAY	KEN	NHA	NSH	IRP	IOW	GLN; 42	CGV												122nd	0^{1}	
2011	MAKE Motorsports	50	Chevy																									BRI; DNQ	ATL; 27	RCH; DNQ	CHI; 43	DOV; 42	KAN; 42	CLT; 23	TEX; 41	PHO	HOM; DNQ		122nd	0^{1}	
2012	MAKE Motorsports	50	Chevy	DAY; 24	PHO; 29	LVS; 31	BRI; 34	CAL; 27	TEX; 26	RCH; 28	TAL; 31	DAR; 32	IOW; 27	CLT; 30	DOV; 24	MCH; 32	ROA; 37	KEN; 27	DAY; 39		CHI; 38	IND; 39	IOW; 36	GLN	CGV	BRI	ATL	RCH	CHI	KEN		CLT; DNQ	KAN	TEX; 43	PHO	HOM			25th	258	
2012	MAKE Motorsports	50	Toyota																	NHA; 35																			25th	258	
2012	The Motorsports Group	47	Chevy																												DOV; 41								25th	258	
2013	The Motorsports Group	42	Chevy	DAY	PHO	LVS	BRI	CAL	TEX	RCH	TAL	DAR	CLT	DOV	IOW; 37	MCH	ROA	KEN	DAY	NHA	CHI; 36	IND	IOW; 37		MOH; DNQ	BRI	ATL	RCH	CHI	KEN; 38									45th	102	
2013	The Motorsports Group	46	Chevy																					GLN; 38															45th	102	
2013	The Motorsports Group	40	Chevy																												DOV; 28	KAN; 33	CLT; 28	TEX; 32	PHO; 37	HOM; 38			45th	102	
2014	JGL Racing	93	Dodge	DAY	PHO	LVS	BRI	CAL	TEX	DAR	RCH	TAL	IOW	CLT	DOV	MCH	ROA	KEN	DAY	NHA	CHI	IND	IOW	GLN	MOH	BRI	ATL	RCH	CHI	KEN	DOV	KAN	CLT	TEX	PHO; 38	HOM; 15			104th	0^{1}	
2015	JGL Racing	26	Toyota	DAY	ATL	LVS	PHO	CAL	TEX	BRI	RCH	TAL	IOW	CLT	DOV	MCH	CHI; 23	DAY	KEN	NHA	IND	IOW					DAR; 36	RCH	CHI; 38	KEN; 35	DOV; 36	CLT; 36	KAN; 36	TEX; 38	PHO; 36	HOM; 39			103rd	0^{1}	
2015	MBM Motorsports	40	Toyota																				GLN; QL^{†}	MOH	BRI	ROA													103rd	0^{1}	
2016	JGL Racing	24	Toyota	DAY	ATL	LVS	PHO; 26	CAL	TEX	BRI	RCH	TAL	DOV																										39th	89	
2016	MBM Motorsports	40	Dodge											CLT; DNQ																									39th	89	
2016	MBM Motorsports	13	Dodge												POC; 32																								39th	89	
2016	Obaika Racing	97	Chevy													MCH; 28	IOW	DAY	KEN; 28					MOH; 32	BRI; 31	ROA	DAR	RCH	CHI	KEN	DOV	CLT	KAN	TEX	PHO	HOM			39th	89	
2016	Obaika Racing	77	Chevy																	NHA; 27	IND; DNQ	IOW; 38	GLN; 38																39th	89	
^{†} - Qualified but replaced by Morgan Shepherd

==== Gander RV & Outdoors Truck Series ====
NASCAR Gander RV & Outdoors Truck Series results
Year	Team	No.	Make	1	2	3	4	5	6	7	8	9	10	11	12	13	14	15	16	17	18	19	20	21	22	23	24	25	NGTC	Pts	Ref
2003	Team Racing	86	Chevy	DAY	DAR	MMR; 18	MAR; 28	CLT	DOV; 12	TEX	MEM	MLW; 28	KAN; 25	KEN; 29	GTW; 28	MCH	IRP; 25	NSH; 26	BRI	RCH	NHA								26th	1059	
2003	Pro Motion Motorsports	53	Chevy																			CAL; 30							26th	1059	
2003	Pro Motion Motorsports	53	Ford																				LVS; 23	SBO	TEX; 27	MAR	PHO	HOM	26th	1059	
2005	Glynn Motorsports	65	Dodge	DAY	CAL	ATL	MAR	GTY	MFD	CLT	DOV	TEX	MCH	MLW	KAN	KEN; 16	MEM	IRP	NSH	BRI	RCH	NHA	LVS	MAR	ATL	TEX	PHO	HOM	75th	115	
2006	Green Light Racing	07	Chevy	DAY	CAL	ATL	MAR	GTY	CLT	MFD	DOV	TEX	MCH	MLW	KAN	KEN	MEM	IRP	NSH	BRI	NHA; 21	LVS	TAL	MAR	ATL	TEX	PHO	HOM	77th	105	
2007	Roush Fenway Racing	50	Ford	DAY	CAL	ATL; 26	MAR; 23	KAN; 22	CLT; 9	MFD; 13	DOV; 30	TEX; 23	MCH; 20	MLW	MEM	KEN	IRP	NSH	BRI	GTW; 24	NHA; 16	LVS; 31	TAL; 31	MAR	ATL; 30	TEX; 17	PHO; 15	HOM; 17	22nd	1569	
2008	TRG Motorsports	7	Chevy	DAY	CAL	ATL	MAR	KAN	CLT	MFD	DOV	TEX; 31	MCH; 20	MLW; 29	MEM; 18	KEN; 25	IRP; 7	NSH; 19	BRI; 6	GTW; 29	NHA; 10	LVS; 8	TAL; 8	MAR; 6	ATL; 9	TEX; 32	PHO; 27	HOM; 12	22nd	1906	
2009	Red Horse Racing	11	Toyota	DAY; 11	CAL; 5	ATL; 12	MAR; 31	KAN; 22	CLT; 30	DOV; 23	TEX; 14	MCH; 18	MLW; 28	MEM; 18	KEN; 23	IRP; 15	NSH; 10	BRI; 8	CHI; 15	IOW; 7	GTW; 24	NHA; 12	LVS; 12	MAR; 30	TAL; 29	TEX; 23	PHO; 13	HOM; 10	15th	2767	
2010	MAKE Motorsports	50	Chevy	DAY	ATL	MAR	NSH	KAN	DOV	CLT; 27	TEX	MCH	IOW	GTY	IRP	POC	NSH	DAR; 26	BRI	CHI	KEN	NHA	LVS	MAR	TAL	TEX; 19	PHO	HOM	68th	273	
2011	MAKE Motorsports	50	Chevy	DAY; 31	PHO	DAR; 22	MAR	NSH	DOV	CLT; 31	KAN	TEX	KEN	IOW	NSH	IRP	POC	MCH	BRI	ATL	CHI	NHA	KEN	LVS	TAL	MAR			103rd	0^{1}	
2011	JJC Racing	0	Ford																								TEX; 32	HOM	103rd	0^{1}	
2012	JJC Racing	0	Ram	DAY	MAR	CAR	KAN	CLT	DOV	TEX	KEN	IOW	CHI; 34	POC															102nd	0^{1}	
2012	JJC Racing	0	Ford												MCH; 35	BRI	ATL	IOW	KEN	LVS	TAL	MAR	TEX	PHO	HOM				102nd	0^{1}	
2013	MAKE Motorsports	1	Chevy	DAY	MAR	CAR; DNQ	KAN	CLT	DOV	TEX	KEN	IOW	ELD	POC	MCH	BRI	MSP	IOW	CHI	LVS	TAL	MAR	TEX	PHO	HOM				NA	-	
2014	MAKE Motorsports	50	Chevy	DAY	MAR	KAN; 17	CLT; 18	DOV; 15	TEX; 18	GTW; 19	KEN; 25	IOW; 24	ELD; 21	POC; 29	MCH; 25	BRI; 28	MSP; 21	CHI; 26	NHA; 25	LVS; 25	TAL	MAR; 36	TEX; 25	PHO	HOM				22nd	352	
2015	Premium Motorsports	94	Chevy	DAY	ATL	MAR	KAN	CLT	DOV	TEX	GTW	IOW	KEN	ELD	POC	MCH	BRI	MSP; 13	CHI	NHA	LVS	TAL	MAR	TEX	PHO	HOM			98th	0^{1}	
2017	Niece Motorsports	45	Chevy	DAY; DNQ	ATL; 17	MAR; 24	KAN	CLT; 14	DOV; 23	TEX; 14	GTW; 15		KEN; 26	ELD	POC; 14	MCH; 16	BRI; 21	MSP	CHI	NHA; 16					PHO; 30	HOM; 16			20th	257	
2017	Niece Motorsports	38	Chevy									IOW; 29									LVS; 24	TAL	MAR	TEX					20th	257	
2018	Niece Motorsports	38	Chevy	DAY	ATL	LVS	MAR	DOV	KAN	CLT	TEX	IOW	GTW	CHI	KEN	ELD	POC	MCH	BRI	MSP	LVS; 21	TAL	MAR	TEX	PHO	HOM			73rd	16	
2019	Niece Motorsports	38	Chevy	DAY	ATL	LVS	MAR	TEX	DOV	KAN; 26	CLT	TEX	IOW	GTW	CHI	KEN	POC; 26	ELD	MCH; 29	BRI	MSP	LVS	TAL	MAR	PHO	HOM			60th	30	
2020	CMI Motorsports	83	Chevy	DAY	LVS	CLT; 33	ATL; 38																						71st	15	
2020	Niece Motorsports	40	Chevy					HOM; 35	POC	KEN	TEX	KAN	KAN	MCH	DAY	DOV	GTW	DAR	RCH	BRI	LVS	TAL	KAN	TEX	MAR	PHO			71st	15	

* Season still in progress
^{1} Ineligible for series points

=== ARCA Re/Max Series ===
(key) (Bold – Pole position awarded by qualifying time. Italics – Pole position earned by points standings or practice time. * – Most laps led.)

ARCA Re/Max Series results
Year	Team	No.	Make	1	2	3	4	5	6	7	8	9	10	11	12	13	14	15	16	17	18	19	20	21	22	23	ARMC	Pts	Ref
2004	Brad Kemp Motorsports	08	Chevy	DAY; 20	NSH; 30	SLM; 10	KEN; 22	TOL; 13	CLT; 9	KAN; 11	POC; 11	MCH; 24	SBO; 6	BLN; 5	KEN; 13	GTW; 8	POC; 5	LER; 5	NSH; 6	ISF; 28	TOL; 5	DSF; 3	CHI; 2*	SLM; 7	TAL; 6		3rd	5140	
2005	Hardcore Motorsports	08	Chevy	DAY; 6																							30th	1570	
2005	James Hylton Motorsports	48	Chevy		NSH; 39	SLM; 2	KEN; 40	TOL; 5	LAN; 30	MIL; 7	POC; 31	MCH; 20	KAN	KEN; 33	BLN	POC	GTW	LER	NSH	MCH	ISF; 29	TOL	DSF	CHI	SLM	TAL	30th	1570	
2006	Bobby Jones Racing	50	Dodge	DAY; 9	NSH; 4	SLM; 21	WIN; 2	KEN; 13	TOL; 12	POC; 25																	30th	1615	
2006	Andy Belmont Racing	1	Ford								MCH; DNQ	KAN	KEN	BLN	POC	GTW	NSH										30th	1615	
2006	Ken Weaver Racing	20	Dodge															MCH; 17	ISF	MIL	TOL	DSF	CHI	SLM	TAL	IOW	30th	1615	

=== Rolex Sports Car Series ===
(key)

==== 24 Hours of Daytona ====
24 Hours of Daytona results
Year	Class	No	Team	Car	Co-drivers	Laps	Position	Class pos.
2002	SR	49	(United Kingdom) Team Ascari	Pontiac Riley	(South Africa) Werner Lupberger (Finland) Harri Toivonen	429	38 ^{DNF}	10 ^{DNF}
