= 2011 AdvoCare 500 =

Race details
- Race 25 of 36 in the 2011 NASCAR Sprint Cup Series
- Date: September 6, 2011
- Location: Atlanta Motor Speedway, Hampton, Georgia
- Course: Permanent racing facility
- Course length: 1.54 miles (2.48 km)
- Distance: 325 laps, 500.5 mi (805.5 km)
- Weather: Partly cloudy with temperatures around 95 °F (35 °C); wind out of the SW at 5 mph (8.0 km/h).

Pole position
Driver	Kasey Kahne	Red Bull Racing Team
- Time: 29.775

Most laps led
Driver	Jeff Gordon	Hendrick Motorsports
- Laps: 146

Winner
No. 24	Jeff Gordon	Hendrick Motorsports

Television in the United States
- Network: ESPN
- Announcers: Allen Bestwick, Dale Jarrett and Andy Petree

The 2011 AdvoCare 500 was a NASCAR Sprint Cup Series race scheduled to be held on September 4, 2011, at Atlanta Motor Speedway in Hampton, Georgia, but was rescheduled to September 6, 2011, because of Tropical Storm Lee. Contested over 325 laps, it was the 25th race of the 2011 Sprint Cup Series season. Jeff Gordon's win, the 85th of his Cup Series career, gave him sole possession of the record for most Cup wins in NASCAR's "modern era" (1972–present), surpassing Darrell Waltrip. Gordon also took sole possession of third place on the all-time Cup Series wins list, ahead of Waltrip and Bobby Allison. The race was also known for being the first NASCAR race since 2007 to be run on a Tuesday.

== Report ==
=== Background ===
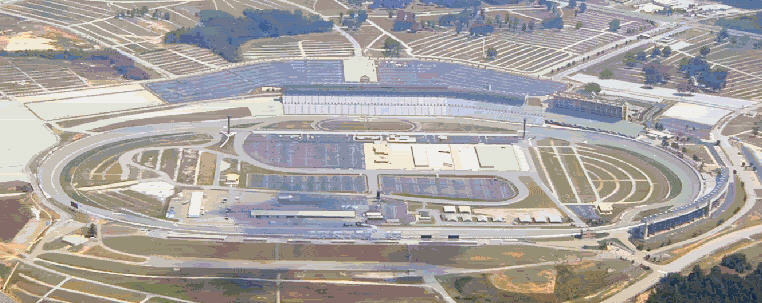
Atlanta Motor Speedway, the race track where the race was held.

Atlanta Motor Speedway is one of ten intermediate to hold NASCAR races. The standard track at Atlanta Motor Speedway is a four-turn quad-oval track that is 1.54 miles (2.48 km) long. The track's turns are banked at twenty-four degrees, while the front stretch, the location of the finish line, and the back stretch are banked at five.

Before the race, Kyle Busch and Jimmie Johnson led the Drivers' Championship with 830 points, and Matt Kenseth stood in third with 798 points. Carl Edwards was fourth in the Drivers' Championship with 795 points, and Kevin Harvick was fifth with 782 points. Jeff Gordon, Ryan Newman, Kurt Busch, Dale Earnhardt Jr. and Tony Stewart rounded out the first ten positions. In the Manufacturers' Championship, Chevrolet was leading with 153 points, 19 points ahead of Ford. Toyota, with 133 points, was 25 points ahead of Dodge in the battle for third. Stewart was the race's defending champion.

=== Practice and qualifying ===
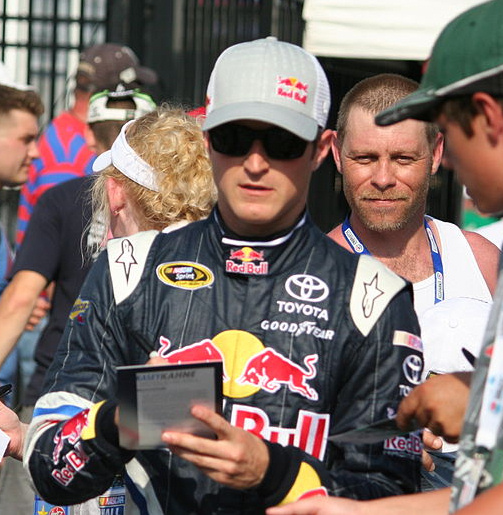
Kasey Kahne won the pole position for Red Bull Racing Team

Two practice sessions were held before the Sunday race, one on Friday and the other on Saturday. The first session lasted 80 minutes, while the second session ran for 90 minutes. During the first practice session, Brad Keselowski was quickest, ahead of Denny Hamlin and Clint Bowyer in second and third. Martin Truex Jr. was scored fourth quickest, while Mark Martin was fifth. In the second and final practice session, Gordon was scored quickest, as Stewart and Bowyer followed in the second and third positions. Keselowski was scored in the fourth position, while Greg Biffle followed in fifth.

During qualifying, forty-seven cars were entered, but only forty-three would be able because of NASCAR's qualifying procedure. Kasey Kahne clinched his eighth career pole position, with a time of 29.775 seconds. He was joined on the front row of the grid by Bowyer. Kyle Busch qualified third, Brian Vickers took fourth, and Gordon started fifth. Kenseth, Edwards, Truex Jr., Newman, and Kurt Busch rounded out the first ten positions. The four drivers that failed to qualify for the race were T. J. Bell, David Stremme, Geoff Bodine, and Tony Raines.

After winning the pole position, Kahne stated, "It was definitely not a perfect lap, but it was a little better than what everyone else did. I've ran better laps than that before and not been on the pole. You never know what you're going to get, but the track is pretty slippery right now and I like it like that." He also commented, "We need to win if we want to make the Chase. Right now we're one of the ones on the outside looking in." Bowyer, who qualified second, was relieved because of his good starting position: "A good qualifying run is a breath of fresh air for all of us. We need a good run desperately." He continued, "She was loose, holy cow! It was a handful for all of us."

=== Race ===
The race, the 25th in the season, was scheduled to begin at 7:30 p.m. EDT. However, because of inclement weather from Tropical Storm Lee, NASCAR moved the start time twenty minutes earlier than the scheduled time. The race was not able to be held as expected on September 4, 2011, and was rescheduled on September 6, 2011, at 11:00 a.m. EDT. The race was televised live in the United States on ESPN. This race was the first NASCAR race to be held on a Tuesday since 2007.

== Results ==
=== Qualifying ===
Grid	No.	Driver	Team	Manufacturer	Time (s)	Speed (mph)
1	4	Kasey Kahne	Red Bull Racing Team	Toyota	29.775	186.197
2	33	Clint Bowyer	Richard Childress Racing	Chevrolet	29.819	185.922
3	18	Kyle Busch	Joe Gibbs Racing	Toyota	29.832	185.841
4	83	Brian Vickers	Red Bull Racing Team	Toyota	29.843	185.772
5	24	Jeff Gordon	Hendrick Motorsports	Chevrolet	29.849	185.735
6	17	Matt Kenseth	Roush Fenway Racing	Ford	29.853	185.710
7	99	Carl Edwards	Roush Fenway Racing	Ford	29.877	185.561
8	56	Martin Truex Jr.	Michael Waltrip Racing	Toyota	29.880	185.542
9	39	Ryan Newman	Stewart–Haas Racing	Chevrolet	29.889	185.486
10	22	Kurt Busch	Penske Racing	Dodge	29.915	185.325
11	43	A. J. Allmendinger	Richard Petty Motorsports	Ford	29.921	185.288
12	42	Juan Pablo Montoya	Earnhardt Ganassi Racing	Chevrolet	29.939	185.176
13	11	Denny Hamlin	Joe Gibbs Racing	Toyota	29.947	185.127
14	2	Brad Keselowski	Penske Racing	Dodge	29.949	185.115
15	16	Greg Biffle	Roush Fenway Racing	Ford	29.958	185.059
16	00	David Reutimann	Michael Waltrip Racing	Toyota	30.000	184.800
17	48	Jimmie Johnson	Hendrick Motorsports	Chevrolet	30.055	184.462
18	9	Marcos Ambrose	Richard Petty Motorsports	Ford	30.086	184.272
19	6	David Ragan	Roush Fenway Racing	Ford	30.128	184.015
20	14	Tony Stewart	Stewart–Haas Racing	Chevrolet	30.147	183.899
21	29	Kevin Harvick	Richard Childress Racing	Chevrolet	30.163	183.801
22	27	Paul Menard	Richard Childress Racing	Chevrolet	30.183	183.680
23	47	Bobby Labonte	JTG Daugherty Racing	Toyota	30.230	183.394
24	20	Joey Logano	Joe Gibbs Racing	Toyota	30.232	183.382
25	1	Jamie McMurray	Earnhardt Ganassi Racing	Chevrolet	30.239	183.339
26	78	Regan Smith	Furniture Row Racing	Chevrolet	30.270	183.152
27	31	Jeff Burton	Richard Childress Racing	Chevrolet	30.275	183.121
28	66	Michael McDowell	HP Racing	Toyota	30.291	183.025
29	88	Dale Earnhardt Jr.	Hendrick Motorsports	Chevrolet	30.312	182.898
30	46	Scott Speed	Whitney Motorsports	Ford	30.319	182.856
31	38	J. J. Yeley	Front Row Motorsports	Ford	30.378	182.501
32	5	Mark Martin	Hendrick Motorsports	Chevrolet	30.388	182.440
33	7	Robby Gordon	Robby Gordon Motorsports	Dodge	30.502	181.759
34	87	Joe Nemechek	NEMCO Motorsports	Toyota	30.513	181.693
35	36	Dave Blaney	Tommy Baldwin Racing	Chevrolet	30.556	181.437
36	34	David Gilliland	Front Row Motorsports	Ford	30.673	180.745
37	51	Landon Cassill	Phoenix Racing	Chevrolet	30.702	180.575
38	13	Casey Mears	Germain Racing	Toyota	30.757	180.252
39	60	Mike Skinner	Germain Racing	Chevrolet	30.798	180.012
40	32	Mike Bliss	FAS Lane Racing	Ford	30.819	179.889
41	55	Travis Kvapil	Front Row Motorsports	Ford	30.822	179.872
42	71	Andy Lally	TRG Motorsports	Ford	31.060	178.493
43	95	David Starr	Leavine Family Racing	Ford	30.845	179.737
Failed to Qualify
	37	Tony Raines	Max Q Motorsports	Ford	30.870	179.592
	30	David Stremme	Inception Motorsports	Chevrolet	30.883	179.516
	35	Geoff Bodine	Tommy Baldwin Racing	Chevrolet	31.014	178.758
	50	T. J. Bell	LTD Powersports	Chevrolet	31.034	178.643

=== Race results ===
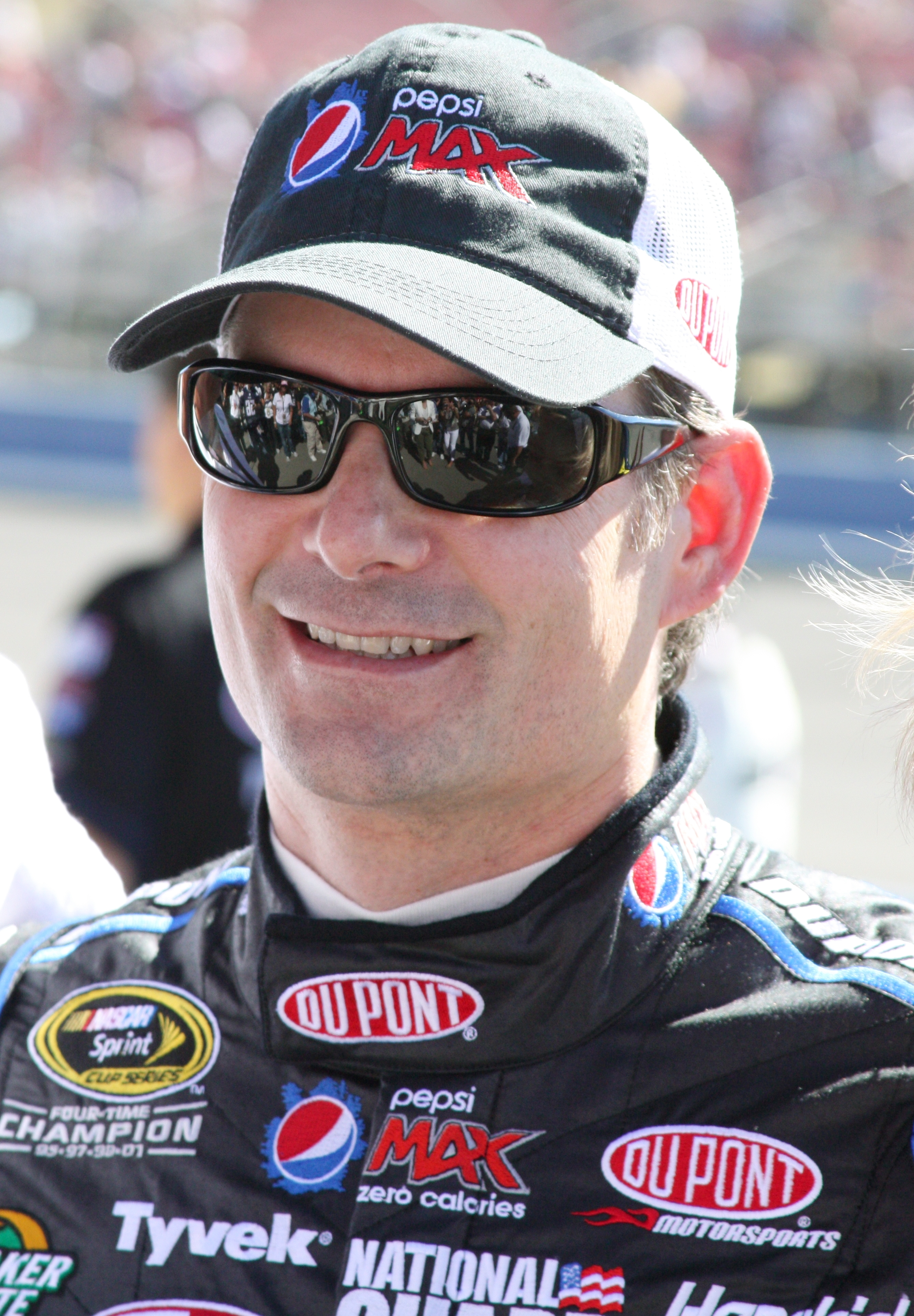
Jeff Gordon scored the 85th win of his Cup Series career.

Pos	Car	Driver	Team	Manufacturer	Laps	Points
1	24	Jeff Gordon	Hendrick Motorsports	Chevrolet	325	48
2	48	Jimmie Johnson	Hendrick Motorsports	Chevrolet	325	43
3	14	Tony Stewart	Stewart–Haas Racing	Chevrolet	325	41
4	22	Kurt Busch	Penske Racing	Dodge	325	40
5	99	Carl Edwards	Roush Fenway Racing	Ford	325	40
6	2	Brad Keselowski	Penske Racing	Dodge	325	39
7	29	Kevin Harvick	Richard Childress Racing	Chevrolet	325	37
8	11	Denny Hamlin	Joe Gibbs Racing	Toyota	325	37
9	17	Matt Kenseth	Roush Fenway Racing	Ford	325	36
10	43	A.J. Allmendinger	Richard Petty Motorsports	Ford	325	34
11	83	Brian Vickers	Red Bull Racing Team	Toyota	325	33
12	16	Greg Biffle	Roush Fenway Racing	Ford	325	32
13	31	Jeff Burton	Richard Childress Racing	Chevrolet	325	31
14	56	Martin Truex Jr.	Michael Waltrip Racing	Toyota	325	31
15	42	Juan Pablo Montoya	Earnhardt Ganassi Racing	Chevrolet	325	29
16	1	Jamie McMurray	Earnhardt Ganassi Racing	Chevrolet	325	28
17	5	Mark Martin	Hendrick Motorsports	Chevrolet	325	27
18	27	Paul Menard	Richard Childress Racing	Chevrolet	325	26
19	88	Dale Earnahrdt Jr.	Hendrick Motorsports	Chevrolet	325	25
20	39	Ryan Newman	Stewart–Haas Racing	Chevrolet	325	24
21	9	Marcos Ambrose	Richard Petty Motorsports	Ford	324	23
22	51	Landon Cassill	Phoenix Racing	Chevrolet	324	0
23	18	Kyle Busch	Joe Gibbs Racing	Toyota	324	22
24	20	Joey Logano	Joe Gibbs Racing	Toyota	324	20
25	38	J. J. Yeley	Front Row Motorsports	Ford	324	20
26	32	Mike Bliss	FAS Lane Racing	Ford	324	0
27	36	Mike Skinner	Tommy Baldwin Racing	Chevrolet	323	0
28	13	Casey Mears	Germain Racing	Toyota	321	16
29	95	David Starr	Leavine Family Racing	Ford	320	0
30	71	Andy Lally	TRG Motorsports	Ford	319	15
31	00	David Reutimann	Michael Waltrip Racing	Toyota	315	13
32	46	Scott Speed	Whitney Motorsports	Ford	310	0
33	78	Regan Smith	Furniture Row Racing	Chevrolet	284	11
34	4	Kasey Kahne	Red Bull Racing Team	Toyota	269	11
35	6	David Ragan	Roush Fenway Racing	Ford	249	9
36	33	Clint Bowyer	Richard Childress Racing	Chevrolet	243	9
37	34	David Gilliland	Front Row Motorsports	Ford	174	7
38	47	Bobby Labonte	JTG Daugherty Racing	Toyota	91	0
39	7	Robby Gordon	Robby Gordon Motorsports	Dodge	34	5
40	87	Joe Nemechek	NEMCO Motorsports	Toyota	27	0
41	66	Michael McDowell	HP Racing	Toyota	23	3
42	55	Travis Kvapil	Front Row Motorsports	Ford	17	0
43	60	Dave Blaney	Germain Racing	Chevrolet	2	1

== Standings after the race ==
Drivers' Championship standings

Pos	Driver	Points
1	Jimmie Johnson	873
2	Kyle Busch	852 (−21)
3	Carl Edwards	835 (−38)
4	Matt Kenseth	834 (−39)
5	Jeff Gordon	830 (−43)

Manufacturers' Championship standings

Pos	Manufacturer	Points
1	Chevrolet	162
2	Ford	139 (−23)
3	Toyota	136 (−26)
4	Dodge	114 (−48)

- Note: Only the top five positions are included for the driver standings.

Previous race: 2011 Irwin Tools Night Race	Sprint Cup Series; 2011 season	Next race: 2011 Wonderful Pistachios 400
