= 2012 AdvoCare 500 (Atlanta) =

Race details
- Race 25 of 36 in the 2012 NASCAR Sprint Cup Series
- Date: September 2, 2012
- Location: Atlanta Motor Speedway in Hampton, Georgia
- Course: Permanent racing facility
- Course length: 1.54 miles (2.48 km)
- Distance: 327 laps, 503.58 mi (810.433 km)
- Scheduled distance: 325 laps, 500.5 mi (805.476 km)
- Weather: Isolated storms with temperatures around 87°F; wind out of the SSW at 6 mph.
- Average speed: 142.02 miles per hour (228.56 km/h)

Pole position
Driver	Tony Stewart	Stewart–Haas Racing
- Time: 29.787

Most laps led
Driver	Denny Hamlin	Joe Gibbs Racing
- Laps: 105

Winner
No. 11	Denny Hamlin	Joe Gibbs Racing

Television in the United States
- Network: ESPN
- Announcers: Allen Bestwick, Dale Jarrett and Andy Petree

The 2012 AdvoCare 500 was a NASCAR Sprint Cup Series race held on September 2, 2012 at Atlanta Motor Speedway in Hampton, Georgia, United States. Contested over 327 laps, it was the twenty-fifth race of the 2012 NASCAR Sprint Cup Series season. Denny Hamlin of Joe Gibbs Racing won the race, his fourth of the season, while Jeff Gordon finished second ahead of Brad Keselowski.

== Report ==
=== Background ===
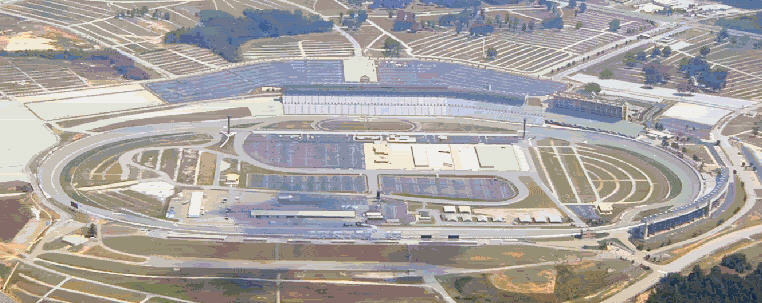
Atlanta Motor Speedway, the race track where the race was held.

Atlanta Motor Speedway is one of ten intermediate tracks to hold NASCAR races. The standard track at Atlanta Motor Speedway is a four-turn quad-oval track that is 1.54 miles (2.48 km) long. The track's turns are banked at twenty-four degrees, while the front stretch, the location of the finish line, and the back stretch are banked at five.

Before the race, Greg Biffle led the Drivers' Championship with 849 points, and Jimmie Johnson stood in second with 838. Dale Earnhardt Jr. was third in the Drivers' Championship with 834 points, eleven ahead of Matt Kenseth and 37 ahead of Martin Truex Jr. in fourth and fifth. Clint Bowyer with 794 was four ahead of Brad Keselowski, as Denny Hamlin with 774 points, was seven points ahead of Kevin Harvick, and 28 in front of Tony Stewart. In the Manufacturers' Championship, Chevrolet was leading with 167 points, 30 ahead of Toyota. Ford, with 122 points, was twenty points ahead of Dodge in the battle for third. Jeff Gordon was the race's defending champion.

=== Practice and qualifying ===
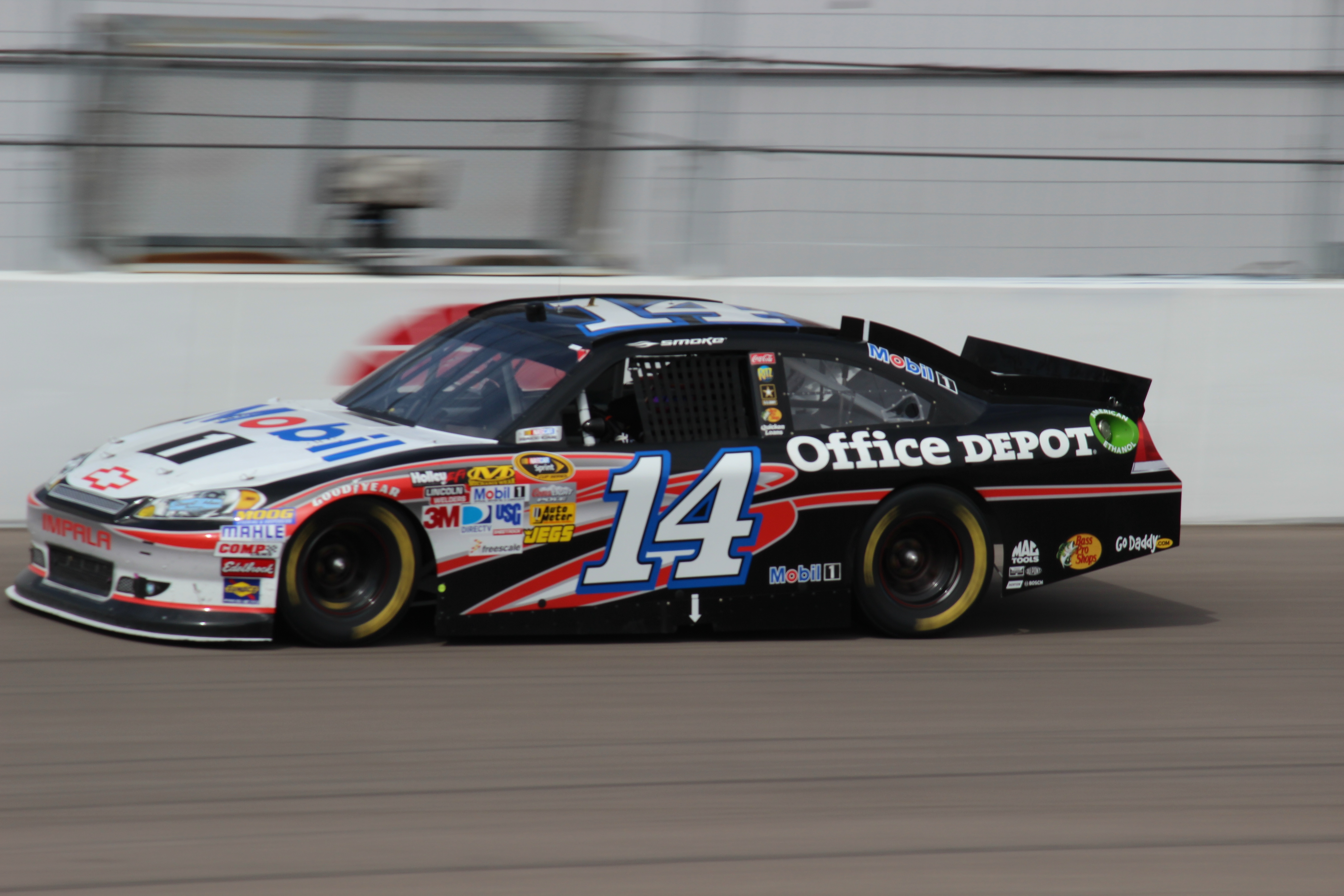
Tony Stewart won the pole position with a time of 29.787

Three practice sessions were held before the Sunday race—one on Friday, August 31, and two on Saturday, September 1. The first session lasted 90 minutes, and the second for 55 minutes. The third and final session finished after 50 minutes. Truex Jr. was quickest with a time of 29.932 seconds in the first session, less than one tenth of a second faster than Kyle Busch. Stewart was just off Busch's pace, followed by Keselowski, Kasey Kahne, and Bowyer. Kenseth was seventh, still within four tenths of a second of Truex's time.

Forty-seven cars were entered for qualifying, but only forty-three could qualify for the race because of NASCAR's qualifying procedure. Stewart clinched the fourteenth pole position of his career, with a time of 29.787 seconds. He was joined on the front row of the grid by Biffle. Kyle Busch qualified third, Kenseth took fourth, and Gordon started fifth. Mark Martin, Hamlin, Johnson, Joey Logano and Marcos Ambrose rounded out the top ten. The four drivers that failed to qualify for the race were Michael McDowell, Josh Wise, Stephen Leicht and Mike Bliss. Once the qualifying session concluded, Stewart stated, "That pole is 100 percent due to Ryan Newman. I'm not sure if we'd have run the line I'd planned on running we'd have been that fast. It's awesome having a teammate like that. I don't ever remember being here and seeing anybody run up at the top like he did."

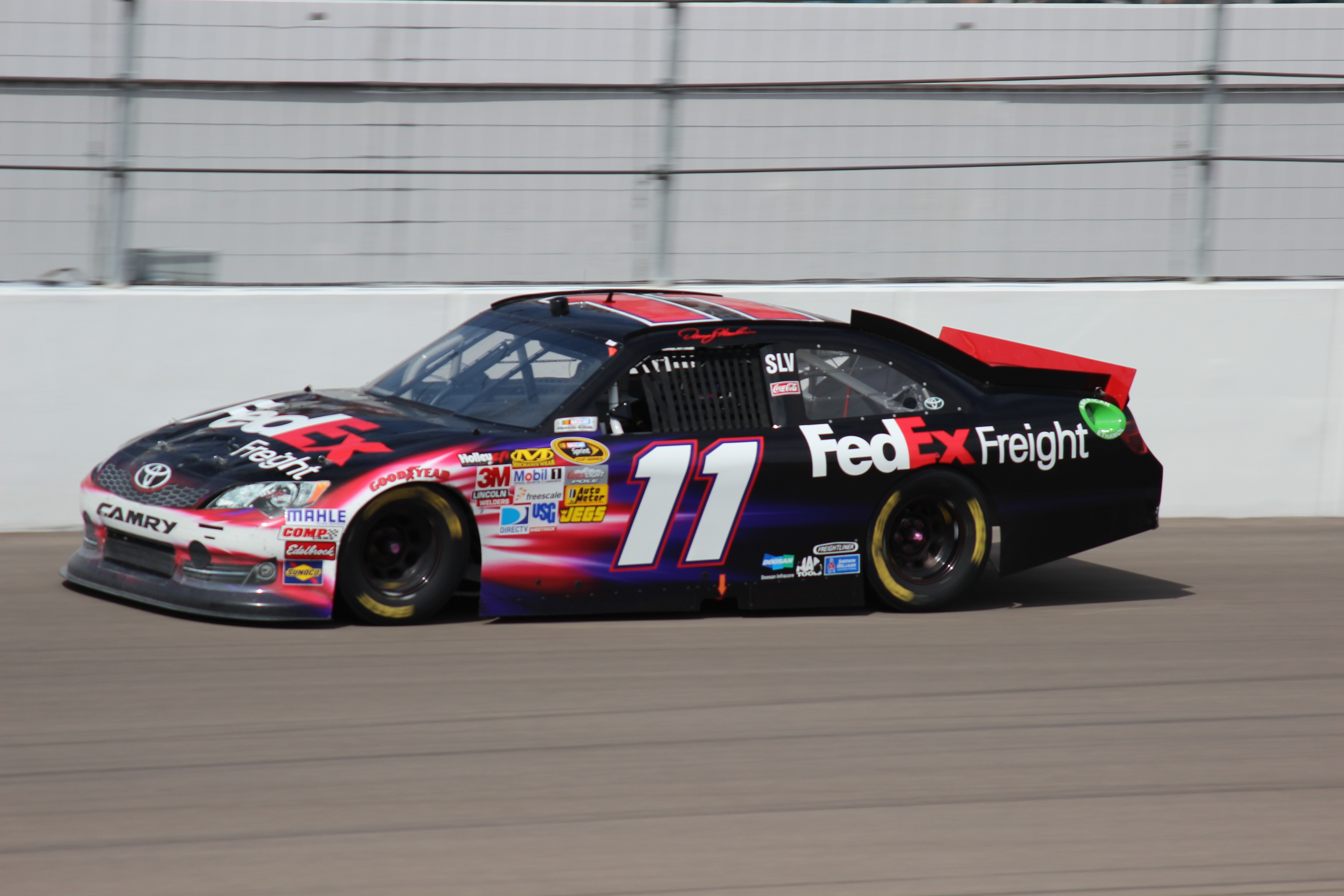
Denny Hamlin won the race after leading the most laps (105).

In the second practice session, Biffle was quickest with a time of 30.629 seconds. Kenseth, with a time of 30.675, was second-quickest, ahead of Earnhardt Jr., Truex Jr., and Bowyer. Gordon, Hamlin, Kyle Busch, Johnson, and Keselowski completed the first ten positions. Kenseth was scored quickest through the third practice session with a time of 30.653, 0.022 seconds faster than his fastest lap during the second session. Gordon was second-quickest in the session, while Hamlin was scored third. Kyle Busch followed in the fourth position ahead of Biffle, Keselowski and Stewart. Truex Jr., Martin and Juan Pablo Montoya rounded out the first ten positions in eighth, ninth and tenth, respectively.

=== Race ===
The race, the 25th in the season, began at 7:30 p.m. EDT and was televised live in the United States on ESPN. Hamlin won the race over second-placed Gordon after coming off of pit lane in the first position during the final caution for Jamie McMurray's crash on the front stretch.

== Results ==
=== Qualifying ===
Grid	No.	Driver	Manufacturer	Time	Speed
1	14	Tony Stewart	Chevrolet	29.787	186.121
2	16	Greg Biffle	Ford	29.863	185.648
3	18	Kyle Busch	Toyota	29.888	185.493
4	17	Matt Kenseth	Ford	29.916	185.319
5	24	Jeff Gordon	Chevrolet	29.918	185.307
6	55	Mark Martin	Toyota	29.930	185.232
7	11	Denny Hamlin	Toyota	29.932	185.220
8	48	Jimmie Johnson	Chevrolet	29.945	185.139
9	20	Joey Logano	Toyota	29.954	185.084
10	9	Marcos Ambrose	Ford	29.959	185.053
11	5	Kasey Kahne	Chevrolet	29.968	184.997
12	99	Carl Edwards	Ford	29.979	184.929
13	43	Aric Almirola	Ford	29.988	184.874
14	34	David Ragan	Ford	30.010	184.738
15	22	Sam Hornish Jr.	Dodge	30.031	184.609
16	51	Kurt Busch	Chevrolet	30.038	184.566
17	39	Ryan Newman	Chevrolet	30.052	184.480
18	27	Paul Menard	Chevrolet	30.061	184.425
19	13	Casey Mears	Ford	30.117	184.082
20	1	Jamie McMurray	Chevrolet	30.119	184.070
21	2	Brad Keselowski	Dodge	30.121	184.058
22	36	Dave Blaney	Chevrolet	30.172	183.747
23	10	Danica Patrick	Chevrolet	30.184	183.643
24	29	Kevin Harvick	Chevrolet	30.189	183.643
25	47	Bobby Labonte	Toyota	30.211	183.509
26	31	Jeff Burton	Chevrolet	30.227	183.412
27	78	Regan Smith	Chevrolet	30.231	183.388
28	56	Martin Truex Jr.	Toyota	30.234	183.370
29	38	David Gilliland	Ford	30.235	183.364
30	15	Clint Bowyer	Toyota	30.240	183.333
31	30	David Stremme	Toyota	30.289	183.037
32	21	Trevor Bayne	Ford	30.314	182.886
33	42	Juan Pablo Montoya	Chevrolet	30.335	182.759
34	49	Jason Leffler	Toyota	30.349	182.675
35	88	Dale Earnhardt Jr.	Chevrolet	30.357	182.627
36	95	Scott Speed	Ford	30.370	182.549
37	87	Joe Nemechek	Toyota	30.398	182.380
38	91	Reed Sorenson	Toyota	30.430	182.189
39	23	Scott Riggs	Chevrolet	30.438	182.141
40	37	J. J. Yeley	Chevrolet	30.450	182.069
41	83	Landon Cassill	Toyota	OP	
42	93	Travis Kvapil	Toyota	OP	
43	32	T. J. Bell	Ford	OP	
Failed to Qualify
	98	Michael McDowell	Ford	30.499	181.776
	26	Josh Wise	Ford	30.564	181.390
	33	Stephen Leicht	Chevrolet	30.582	181.283
	19	Mike Bliss	Toyota	30.689	180.651

- OP – Owners Points

=== Race results ===
Pos	No.	Driver	Manufacturer	Laps Run	Laps Lead	Stadus	Points
1	11	Denny Hamlin	Toyota	327	105	running	48
2	24	Jeff Gordon	Chevrolet	327	6	running	43
3	2	Brad Keselowski	Dodge	327	0	running	41
4	56	Martin Truex Jr.	Toyota	327	40	running	41
5	29	Kevin Harvick	Chevrolet	327	101	running	40
6	18	Kyle Busch	Toyota	327	66	running	39
7	88	Dale Earnhardt Jr.	Chevrolet	327	0	running	37
8	27	Paul Menard	Chevrolet	327	0	running	36
9	17	Matt Kenseth	Ford	327	0	running	35
10	55	Mark Martin	Toyota	327	0	running	34
11	22	Sam Hornish Jr.	Dodge	327	0	running	0
12	31	Jeff Burton	Chevrolet	327	0	running	32
13	51	Kurt Busch	Chevrolet	327	0	running	31
14	78	Regan Smith	Chevrolet	327	0	running	30
15	16	Greg Biffle	Ford	327	1	running	30
16	21	Trevor Bayne	Ford	327	0	running	0
17	9	Marcos Ambrose	Ford	327	0	running	27
18	20	Joey Logano	Toyota	327	0	running	26
19	47	Bobby Labonte	Toyota	327	0	running	25
20	83	Landon Cassill	Toyota	326	0	running	24
21	42	Juan Pablo Montoya	Chevrolet	326	0	running	23
22	14	Tony Stewart	Chevrolet	326	8	running	23
23	5	Kasey Kahne	Chevrolet	325	0	running	21
24	1	Jamie McMurray	Chevrolet	325	0	running	20
25	36	Dave Blaney	Chevrolet	324	0	running	19
26	93	Travis Kvapil	Toyota	324	0	running	18
27	15	Clint Bowyer	Toyota	324	0	running	17
28	34	David Ragan	Ford	323	0	running	16
29	10	Danica Patrick	Chevrolet	321	0	running	0
30	32	T. J. Bell	Ford	319	0	running	0
31	38	David Gilliland	Ford	298	0	running	13
32	43	Aric Almirola	Ford	297	0	running	12
33	13	Casey Mears	Ford	291	0	engine	11
34	48	Jimmie Johnson	Chevrolet	269	0	crash	10
35	39	Ryan Newman	Chevrolet	268	0	crash	9
36	99	Carl Edwards	Ford	264	0	engine	8
37	95	Scott Speed	Ford	196	0	suspension	7
38	49	Jason Leffler	Toyota	77	0	vibration	0
39	30	David Stremme	Toyota	54	0	suspension	5
40	23	Scott Riggs	Chevrolet	43	0	vibration	4
41	37	J. J. Yeley	Chevrolet	32	0	brakes	3
42	91	Reed Sorenson	Toyota	24	0	overheating	0
43	87	Joe Nemechek	Toyota	22	0	rear gear	0

== Standings after the race ==
Drivers' Championship standings

Pos	Driver	Points
1	Greg Biffle*	879
2	Dale Earnhardt Jr.*	871
3	Matt Kenseth*	858
4	Jimmie Johnson*	848
5	Martin Truex Jr.*	838
6	Brad Keselowski*	831
7	Denny Hamlin*	822
8	Clint Bowyer*	811
9	Kevin Harvick*	807
10	Tony Stewart	769

Manufacturers' Championship standings

Pos	Manufacturer	Points
1	Chevrolet	173
2	Toyota	146
3	Ford	125
4	Dodge	106

- Note: Only the first ten positions are included for the driver standings.
- * This driver clinched a position in the Chase for the Sprint Cup.

Previous race: 2012 Irwin Tools Night Race	Sprint Cup Series; 2012 season	Next race: 2012 Federated Auto Parts 400
