= 2011 Budweiser Shootout =

Race details
- Race 1 of 2 exhibition races in the 2011 NASCAR Sprint Cup Series
- Date: February 12, 2011
- Location: Daytona International Speedway, Daytona Beach, Florida
- Course: Permanent racing facility
- Course length: 2.5 miles (4 km)
- Distance: 75 laps, 187.5 mi (301.8 km)
- Average speed: 153.584 miles per hour (247.169 km/h)

Pole position
Driver	Dale Earnhardt Jr.	Hendrick Motorsports

Most laps led
Driver	Jeff Burton	Richard Childress Racing
- Laps: 32

Winner
No. 22	Kurt Busch	Penske Racing

Television in the United States
- Network: Fox Broadcasting Network
- Announcers: Mike Joy, Darrell Waltrip, and Larry McReynolds
- Nielsen ratings: 4.5/8 (Final); 3.9/7 (Overnight); (7.847 million)

The 2011 Budweiser Shootout was a stock car race and the first exhibition event of the 2011 NASCAR Sprint Cup Series. It was held on February 12, 2011, at the Daytona International Speedway in Daytona Beach, Florida. The 75-lap race was won by Kurt Busch for the Penske Racing team. Jamie McMurray finished second and Ryan Newman came in third.

Pole position driver Dale Earnhardt Jr. maintained his lead through the first corner, but Clint Bowyer, who started seventh on the grid, led the first lap. On the 25th lap, the first caution was given, as Jeff Burton became the leader. During the caution all the teams made a pit stop. Two laps later, an accident involving several racecars prompted the second caution to be given. On lap 63, Newman became the leader. He maintained the lead until the final lap, when Denny Hamlin passed him below the yellow line (out of bounds line), as Busch passed him on the other side. Hamlin passed Newman below the yellow line giving the win to Kurt Busch.

There were four cautions and 28 lead changes among ten different drivers throughout the course of the race. It was Busch's first win in the 2011 season, as well as his first win at a track that uses restrictor plates, such as Daytona International Speedway and Talladega Superspeedway. A total of 80,000 people attended the race, while 7.8 million watched it on television.

== Report ==
=== Background ===
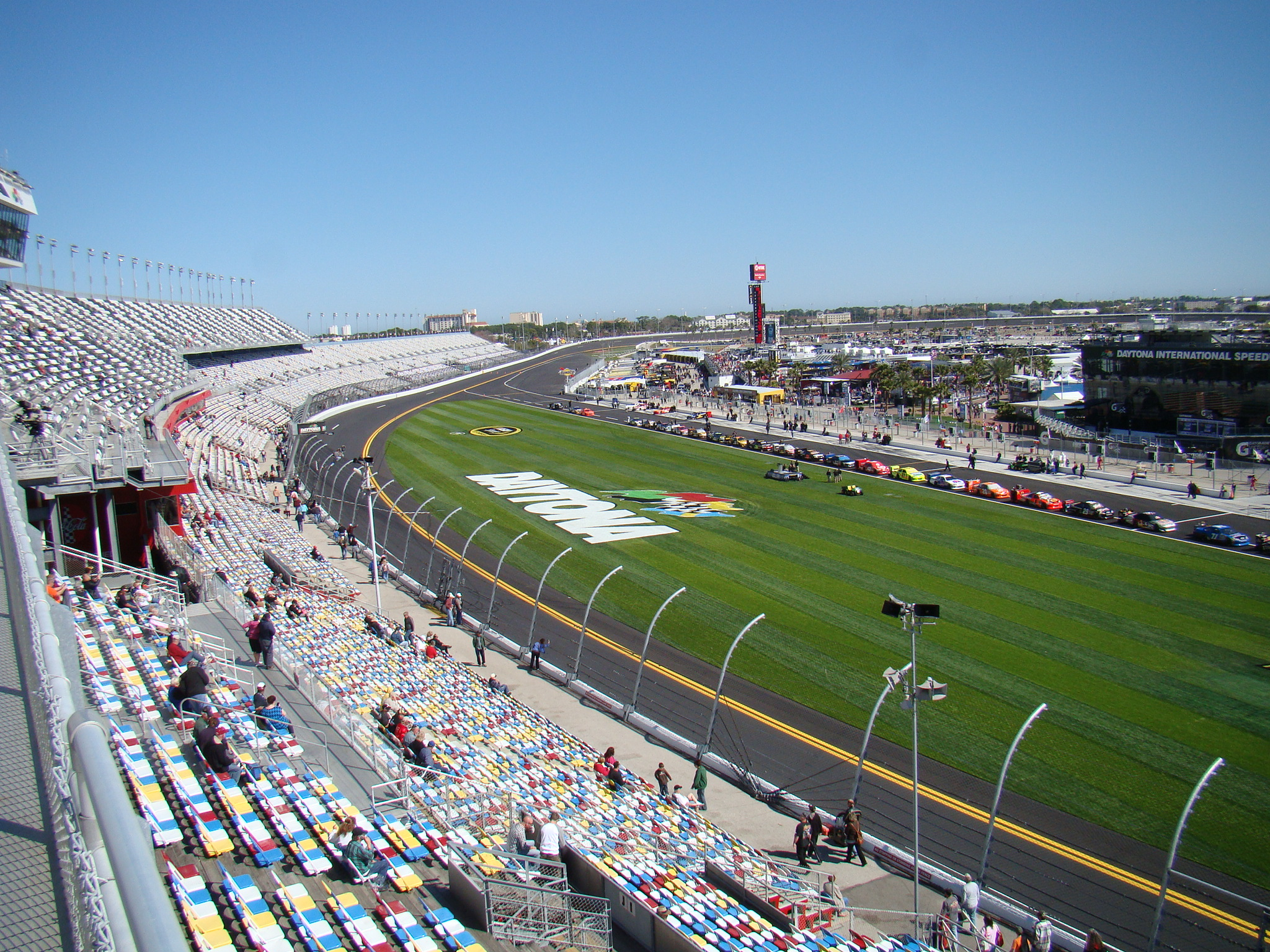
Daytona International Speedway, the race track where the race was held.

The track, Daytona International Speedway, is one of six superspeedways to hold NASCAR races. The standard track at Daytona International Speedway is a four-turn superspeedway that is 2.5 miles (4.0 km) long. The track's turns are banked at 31 degrees, while the front stretch, the location of the finish line, is banked at 18 degrees.

The Budweiser Shootout was created by Busch Beer brand manager Monty Roberts as the Busch Clash in 1979. The race, designed to promote Busch Beer, invites the fastest NASCAR drivers from the previous season to compete. The race is considered a "warm-up" for the Daytona 500. It was renamed the Bud Shootout in 1998. The name changed to the Budweiser Shootout in 2001, and it was rebranded the Sprint Unlimited in 2013.

A total of thirty drivers were eligible to compete in the race, including previous Sprint Cup Series champions, past winners of the race, rookie of the year winners, previous year pole position winners, the participants of the 2010 Chase for the Sprint Cup, and the winners of the Daytona 500 and Coke Zero 400. The race was 75 laps long, with two segments of 25 and 50 laps. In between the segments there was a pit stop that lasted ten minutes. During the pit stop, teams were able to change tires, add fuel, and make normal chassis adjustments, but they were not allowed to change springs, shock absorbers or rear-ends. Also, all the work was done in either the garage or on pit road. The caution laps, as well as the green flag laps was scored in the race. Kevin Harvick was the defending race winner.

=== Practice and qualifying ===
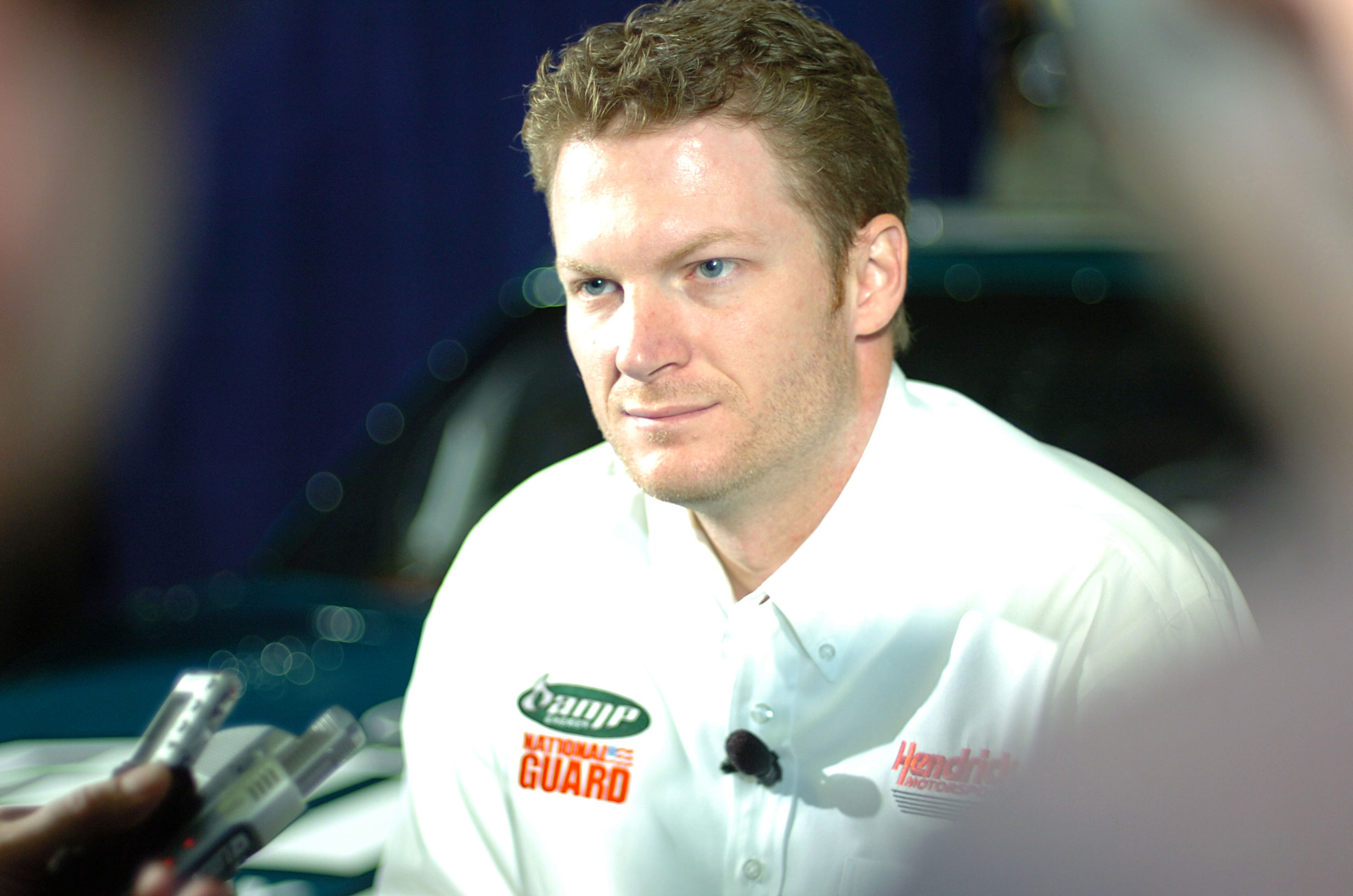
Dale Earnhardt Jr. picked the pole position for Hendrick Motorsports.

Two practice sessions were held before the race, which was on Friday afternoon. The first session lasted 45 minutes, while the second lasted 60 minutes. Dale Earnhardt Jr. was quickest with a time of 45.031 seconds in the first session, less than five hundredths of a second faster than Mark Martin. Jimmie Johnson with a quickest time of 45.082 seconds was third, ahead of Clint Bowyer, Kyle Busch, and Jeff Burton. Ryan Newman was seventh, still within a second of Earnhardt's time. In the second and final practice session, Joey Logano was quickest with a fastest time of 44.316 seconds. Busch followed in second, ahead of Michael Waltrip and Bobby Labonte. Greg Biffle was fifth quickest, with a time of 44.787. Denny Hamlin, Jeff Gordon, Kevin Harvick, Carl Edwards, and Matt Kenseth rounded out to the first ten positions. Also in the final practice session, a caution came out because the flood lights (that light the track for racing) in the first and third turns were turned off.

For qualifying, the 24 drivers that appeared to race chose their starting positions by a draw. Earnhardt chose the pole position, ahead of Tony Stewart, Edwards, Hamlin, and Kahne who rounded out the first five positions. Labonte chose sixth place, while Bowyer chose seventh, ahead of Newman and Derrike Cope in eighth and ninth. Waltrip, Biffle, Gordon, Juan Pablo Montoya, and Jamie McMurray chose the next five positions. Burton, who chose fifteenth, was followed by Kevin Conway, Kurt Busch, Harvick, Kenseth, and Martin in the first 20 positions. Kyle Busch, Logano, Johnson, and Regan Smith chose the last four positions in the race.

=== Race ===
The 2011 Budweiser Shootout was the first exhibition race of the season, and was televised live in the United States on Fox which began at 8:10 p.m. EST. The conditions on the grid were dry before the race, the air temperature at 51 °F (11 °C) with clear skies expected. Country music singer Laura Bell Bundy began pre-race ceremonies, performing the national anthem. Bob Hadley of Westside Baptist Church in Daytona Beach, Florida then delivered the invocation, and actress Amber Heard gave the command for drivers to start their engines.

Earnhardt retained his pole position lead into the first corner, but by the conclusion of the first lap, Bowyer was leading. Bowyer remained the leader for the next four laps with assistance from Earnhardt. On the sixth lap, Kahne drove to pit road because of problems with his racecar. On the following lap, Stewart and Hamlin began to draft with each other while in the third and fourth positions. By lap nine, Johnson had moved up 16 positions into the fifth position. One lap later, Burton, with assistance from Earnhardt, moved up to the first position, but on lap 11, Earnhardt reclaimed the lead. On the twelfth lap, Stewart became the leader, but after one lap Burton reclaimed the first position as Edwards moved up to second. On the 14th lap, Burton remained the leader, ahead of Edwards and Kurt Busch. Afterward, Earnhardt fell to fifth. However, he moved up to the second position on the following lap while drafting with Kyle Busch to become the leader on lap 17. Kyle Busch became the fourth different leader in the race.

On the 20th lap, Burton, with assistance from Edwards moved to first and second, as Waltrip had a highest speed of 206 miles per hour (332 km/h), the fastest lap speed in a NASCAR cup series race since 1987. On lap 22, Busch became the leader, but after leading one lap, Earnhardt took over the lead position. Three laps later, the first caution was given as a break during the race. Also on the same lap, Burton became the leader. Just after the caution was given, all the teams pitted. After ten minutes the racecars returned to the track for the restart. Burton remained the leader, ahead of Harvick, Kenseth, Earnhardt, and Johnson. On the 27th lap, the second caution was given because of an accident involving Earnhardt, Montoya, Smith, Edwards, Logano, and Conway. Two laps later, Johnson, Bowyer, and Hamlin pit for new tires. Before the restart on lap 34, it was announced that both Edwards and Earnhardt were out of the race. At the lap 34 restart, Burton remained the leader. On lap 36, the third caution was given because of an accident involving Kyle Busch, and Martin. During the caution, Hamlin pitted.

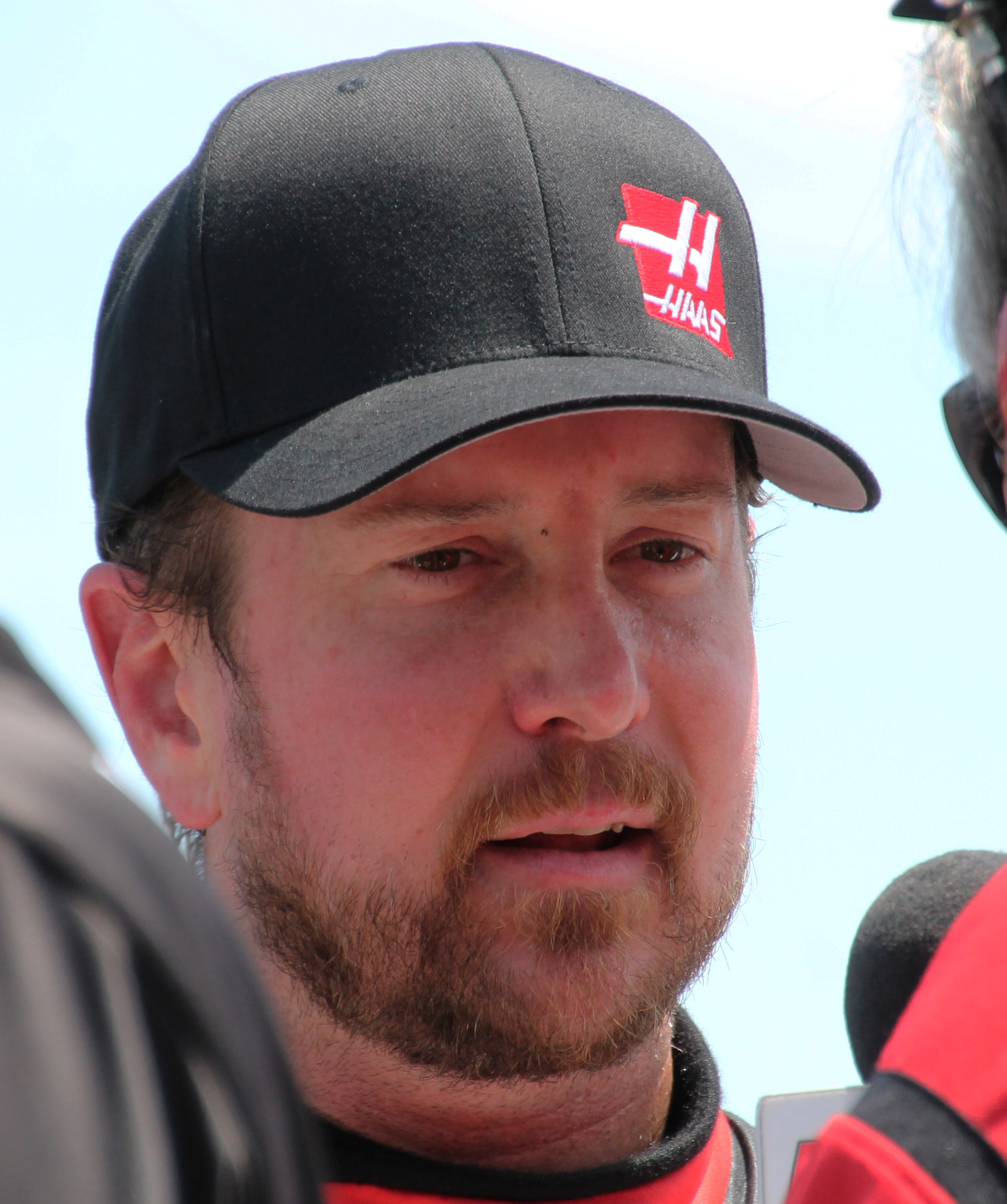
Kurt Busch was declared the winner after Hamlin was announced to have passed below the yellow line.

At lap 39, Burton remained the leader. On the following lap, Gordon became the leader, but after one lap, they were passed by Harvick and Burton. On the 42nd lap, Kyle Busch drove to the garage. Four laps later, Johnson, with assistance from Biffle, became the leader. On lap 48, Waltrip collided into the wall, prompting the fourth caution to be given. One lap later, it was announced that Kyle Busch was out of the race. At the lap 50 restart, Johnson remained the leader. Two laps later, Burton became the leader, after having assistance from Bowyer. On the 56th lap, Johnson reclaimed the lead, but after one lap, Kurt Busch passed him for the first position. On lap 59, Burton became the leader, as Hamlin moved to second. Four laps later, Newman became the leader, after assistance from Hamlin. On lap 70, Newman remained the leader ahead of Hamlin, Kurt Busch, and McMurray. On the final lap, Hamlin moved below the yellow line and became the leader, as Kurt Busch and McMurray were passing them. After Hamlin passed below the yellow line, Kurt Busch became the leader because Hamlin was not scored. McMurray scored second, while Newman finished third, ahead of Johnson and Biffle in fourth and fifth. Gordon, Harvick, Burton, Bowyer, and Labonte rounded out the top ten finishers in the race.

=== Post-race ===
Kurt Busch appeared in victory lane after his victory lap to start celebrating his first win of the season, and his first on any restrictor plate track such as Daytona International Speedeway and Talladega Superspeedway, in front of a crowd of 80,000 people; earning $203,000 for the victory. Following his celebration he said, "McMurray was the man [Saturday night]. He stayed with us. He stayed true. I can't thank him enough for doing that. I hope it was the show the fans wanted to see." He also commented, "What an unbelievable experience, this two-car draft. I had no idea what to expect going in. I was just going to take it one lap at a time and see how it played out. I wanted to learn as the race went on how this Shell/Pennzoil Dodge raced."

McMurray, who finished second in the race, explained, "It's completely different plate racing than we've ever had. I hope it was exciting for the fans to watch. But from the driver's seat, it was actually really exciting to push two-by-two and do the side draft. It is awesome the runs you were able to get, so I hope the fans enjoyed it." In the post race press conference, Hamlin, who passed Newman below the yellow line, described his misfortune, "That yellow line is there to protect us and the fans in the stands, and I just chose to take the safer route. A win in the Shootout is not worth sending the 39 [Newman] through the grandstands. For me, as fast as we're running, if I got into his left rear, that car will go airborne." Edwards who was involved in the largest accident in the race, "We were three- or four-wide back there, and I was going between the 88 and the 78, and I don't think the 78 knew I was in there. He kept coming down, and I just had enough of my car in there. I laid up against the 88 and then the 78 got me in the right-front, but that's just everybody trying to get the best position they can so we can go out there and race." 7.8 million people watched the race on television.

== Results ==
=== Qualifying ===
Car	Driver	Team	Manufacturer	Grid
88	Dale Earnhardt Jr.	Hendrick Motorsports	Chevrolet	1
14	Tony Stewart	Stewart–Haas Racing	Chevrolet	2
99	Carl Edwards	Roush Fenway Racing	Ford	3
11	Denny Hamlin	Joe Gibbs Racing	Toyota	4
4	Kasey Kahne	Red Bull Racing Team	Toyota	5
47	Bobby Labonte	JTG Daugherty Racing	Toyota	6
33	Clint Bowyer	Richard Childress Racing	Chevrolet	7
39	Ryan Newman	Stewart–Haas Racing	Chevrolet	8
64	Derrike Cope	Max Q Motorsports	Toyota	9
15	Michael Waltrip	Michael Waltrip Racing	Toyota	10
16	Greg Biffle	Roush Fenway Racing	Ford	11
24	Jeff Gordon	Hendrick Motorsports	Chevrolet	12
42	Juan Pablo Montoya	Earnhardt Ganassi Racing	Chevrolet	13
1	Jamie McMurray	Earnhardt Ganassi Racing	Chevrolet	14
31	Jeff Burton	Richard Childress Racing	Chevrolet	15
97	Kevin Conway	NEMCO Motorsports	Toyota	16
22	Kurt Busch	Penske Racing	Dodge	17
29	Kevin Harvick	Richard Childress Racing	Chevrolet	18
17	Matt Kenseth	Roush Fenway Racing	Ford	19
5	Mark Martin	Hendrick Motorsports	Chevrolet	20
18	Kyle Busch	Joe Gibbs Racing	Toyota	21
20	Joey Logano	Joe Gibbs Racing	Toyota	22
48	Jimmie Johnson	Hendrick Motorsports	Chevrolet	23
78	Regan Smith	Furniture Row Racing	Chevrolet	24

=== Race results ===
Pos	Car	Driver	Team	Manufacturer	Laps Run
1	22	Kurt Busch	Penske Racing	Dodge	75
2	1	Jamie McMurray	Earnhardt Ganassi Racing	Chevrolet	75
3	39	Ryan Newman	Stewart–Haas Racing	Chevrolet	75
4	48	Jimmie Johnson	Hendrick Motorsports	Chevrolet	75
5	16	Greg Biffle	Roush Fenway Racing	Ford	75
6	24	Jeff Gordon	Hendrick Motorsports	Chevrolet	75
7	29	Kevin Harvick	Richard Childress Racing	Chevrolet	75
8	31	Jeff Burton	Richard Childress Racing	Chevrolet	75
9	33	Clint Bowyer	Richard Childress Racing	Chevrolet	75
10	47	Bobby Labonte	JTG Daugherty Racing	Toyota	75
11	14	Tony Stewart	Stewart–Haas Racing	Chevrolet	75
12	11	Denny Hamlin	Joe Gibbs Racing	Toyota	75
13	17	Matt Kenseth	Roush Fenway Racing	Ford	75
14	64	Derrike Cope	Max Q Motorsports	Toyota	73
15	15	Michael Waltrip	Michael Waltrip Racing	Toyota	47
16	18	Kyle Busch	Joe Gibbs Racing	Toyota	41
17	5	Mark Martin	Hendrick Motorsports	Chevrolet	36
18	20	Joey Logano	Joe Gibbs Racing	Toyota	27
19	88	Dale Earnhardt Jr.	Hendrick Motorsports	Chevrolet	27
20	42	Juan Pablo Montoya	Earnhardt Ganassi Racing	Chevrolet	27
21	99	Carl Edwards	Roush Fenway Racing	Ford	27
22	78	Regan Smith	Furniture Row Racing	Chevrolet	27
23	97	Kevin Conway	NEMCO Motorsports	Toyota	26
24	4	Kasey Kahne	Red Bull Racing Team	Toyota	7
