= 2011 Gatorade Duels =

Stock car races

Race details
- Date: February 17, 2011
- Location: Daytona International Speedway, Daytona Beach, Florida, US
- Course: Permanent racing facility 2.5 mi (4 km)
- Distance: Race 1: 60 laps, 150 mi (240 km); Race 2: 62 laps, 155 mi (249.4 km)
- Avg Speed: Race 1: 159.794 miles per hour (257.164 km/h); Race 2: 136.571 miles per hour (219.790 km/h)
- Weather: Temperatures up to 78 °F (26 °C); wind speeds up to 11.39 miles per hour (18.33 km/h)

Race 1
- Pole position: Dale Earnhardt Jr. – Hendrick Motorsports
- Most laps led: Kevin Harvick – Richard Childress Racing – (20)
- Winner: Kurt Busch – Penske Racing

Race 2
- Pole position: Jeff Gordon – Hendrick Motorsports
- Most laps led: Jeff Burton – Richard Childress Racing – (17)
- Winner: Jeff Burton – Richard Childress Racing

Television
- Network: Speed
- Announcers: Mike Joy, Darrell Waltrip, Larry McReynolds
- Nielsen ratings: 2.0/5 (Final); 1.9/5 (Overnight); (3.303 million)

The 2011 Gatorade Duels were a pair of stock car races held on February 17, 2011, at Daytona International Speedway in Daytona Beach, Florida, United States. The 62 and 60-lap races, held before a crowd of 80,000 people, were the qualifying events for the 2011 Daytona 500, the premier event of the 2011 NASCAR Sprint Cup Series. The first race was won by Kurt Busch for the Penske Racing team. Regan Smith finished second, and Kevin Harvick came in third. Afterward, the second race was won by Jeff Burton. Clint Bowyer followed in the second position, ahead of third-placed Michael Waltrip.

During the first race, Ryan Newman was the leader at the start. However, by the end of the lap Paul Menard became the leader. Afterward, the first caution was given after Newman spun sideways. On the 11th lap, Harvick moved to the first position. Twenty laps later, Busch became the leader. With four laps remaining, Michael McDowell's engine failed, prompting the second caution to be given. At the restart, Matt Kenseth was the leader, but he was passed by Busch one lap later. Busch remained in the first position to win the first Gatorade Duel. There were two cautions and 20 lead changes among nine drivers during the first race.

During the second race, Jeff Gordon was the leader at the start, but after one lap he was passed by Bowyer. On the third lap, Casey Mears' engine failed, prompting the first caution of the race to be given. After the restart, Kyle Busch became the leader. On lap 13, Edwards passed Busch to move into the first position. On the 15th lap, the second caution of the race was given, after Joey Logano collided into the wall. At the restart, Edwards remained the leader, ahead of Kyle Busch. At the end of the race, Burton had assistance from Bowyer to win the race. There were a record-breaking 22 lead changes among seven drivers and five caution periods in the second event.

== Background ==
Daytona International Speedway, the race track where the races were held.

Daytona International Speedway is one of six superspeedways to hold NASCAR races. Its standard track is a four-turn, 2.5-mile (4.0 km) superspeedway. Daytona's turns are banked at 31 degrees and the front stretch (the location of the finish line) is banked at 18 degrees. The defending winners of the races were Jimmie Johnson and Kasey Kahne.

In the early years, qualifying for the Daytona 500 had varying formats: from one timed lap, to the average of two laps, to the better of two laps. The idea of having two individual races to establish the starting lineup of the Daytona 500 dates back to the first race in 1959. The first of the 100-mile (160 km) qualifying races consisted of Convertible division cars and the second of Grand National cars. Between 1960 and 1967, the races were 100 miles (160 km) and were increased to 125 miles (201 km) in 1969. Prior to 1971, the races yielded points to the Drivers' Championship. Large well-established teams approach the races as practice sessions for the Daytona 500 while a successful qualification into the Daytona 500 for smaller less-established teams would allow them to enter future NASCAR events during the season. An unsuccessful qualification meant the team would risk closing down until sponsorship was found. Corporate sponsors purchased naming rights to qualifying races; between 1981 and 1984, Uno cards was the title sponsor for the "Uno Twin 125's" qualifying events. In 1985 they became known as "7-Eleven Twin 125's"; no sponsors funded the 1988, 1989 and 1990 qualifying events and the races were called "Daytona Twin Qualifiers". Gatorade became the sponsor of the dual qualifying events in 1991 and the races were increased to 150 miles (240 km) as it became known as the "Gatorade Duels" in 2005. The races were rebranded as the "Budweiser Duels" in 2013 and became known as the "Can-Am Duels" in 2016.

The top 35 drivers were assigned to Gatorade Duel races based upon their qualifying positions in the previous year's Daytona 500. Drivers who qualified in odd-number positions competed in the first Duel along with the winner of the 2011 Daytona 500 pole. Competitors who qualified in even-numbered places took part in the second Duel. The drivers' finishing positions in both Duels determined their starting positions in the Daytona 500. Positions 40 to 42 were filled with the quickest drivers who did not qualify in the top 35. 43rd place was occupied by an eligible past champion. In the event a past champion was not available, the 43rd position would be filled by the next-fastest driver. Two drivers outside the top 35 qualifying positions were eligible for two transfer spots in each Duel which allowed them to qualify for the Daytona 500.

== Practice and qualifying ==
Two practice sessions were held prior to the races on February 16, 2011. The first practice session ran for 90 minutes, while the second lasted 55 minutes after rain delays. In the first practice session, which was delayed because of rain, Kyle Busch was quickest with a time of 44.943 seconds. He was followed by Greg Biffle, Dale Earnhardt Jr., Johnson, and Juan Pablo Montoya in the next four positions. Also in the session, Earnhardt, along with Martin Truex Jr., collided together, and into the wall. Both sustained major damages to their car, which prompted them to move to back-up cars, meaning Earnhardt had to forfeit the pole position for the race and in the Daytona 500. During the second practice, Kahne was quickest with a time of 44.985 seconds, only one-thousandth of a second faster than Joey Logano. Jeff Gordon followed in the third position, ahead of David Ragan and Kyle Busch.

The qualifying grids were chosen by how they qualified in Daytona 500 pole position qualifying, giving the pole position to Earnhardt in the first race. He was joined on the grid's front row by Paul Menard, with Ryan Newman in third. Mark Martin and Tony Stewart started in fourth and fifth positions. Gordon started from first place in the second event and was joined by Trevor Bayne in second place with Clint Bowyer third. Jeff Burton started fourth, and was followed by Biffle in fifth.

=== Qualifying 1 and 2 results ===
Race 1					Race 2				
No.	Driver	Team	Manufacturer	Grid	No.	Driver	Team	Manufacturer	Grid
88	Dale Earnhardt Jr.	Hendrick Motorsports	Chevrolet	1	24	Jeff Gordon	Hendrick Motorsports	Chevrolet	1
27	Paul Menard	Richard Childress Racing	Chevrolet	2	21	Trevor Bayne	Wood Brothers Racing	Ford	2
39	Ryan Newman	Stewart–Haas Racing	Chevrolet	3	33	Clint Bowyer	Richard Childress Racing	Chevrolet	3
5	Mark Martin	Hendrick Motorsports	Chevrolet	4	31	Jeff Burton	Richard Childress Racing	Chevrolet	4
14	Tony Stewart	Stewart–Haas Racing	Chevrolet	5	16	Greg Biffle	Roush Fenway Racing	Ford	5
22	Kurt Busch	Penske Racing	Dodge	6	6	David Ragan	Roush Fenway Racing	Ford	6
42	Juan Pablo Montoya	Earnhardt Ganassi Racing	Chevrolet	7	99	Carl Edwards	Roush Fenway Racing	Ford	7
9	Marcos Ambrose	Richard Petty Motorsports	Ford	8	38	Travis Kvapil	Front Row Motorsports	Ford	8
29	Kevin Harvick	Richard Childress Racing	Chevrolet	9	00	David Reutimann	Michael Waltrip Racing	Toyota	9
48	Jimmie Johnson	Hendrick Motorsports	Chevrolet	10	2	Brad Keselowski	Penske Racing	Dodge	10
09	Bill Elliott	Phoenix Racing	Chevrolet	11	15	Michael Waltrip	Michael Waltrip Racing	Toyota	11
43	A. J. Allmendinger	Richard Petty Motorsports	Ford	12	1	Jamie McMurray	Earnhardt Ganassi Racing	Chevrolet	12
87	Joe Nemechek	NEMCO Motorsports	Toyota	13	18	Kyle Busch	Joe Gibbs Racing	Toyota	13
17	Matt Kenseth	Roush Fenway Racing	Ford	14	56	Martin Truex Jr.	Michael Waltrip Racing	Toyota	14
36	Dave Blaney	Tommy Baldwin Racing	Chevrolet	15	20	Joey Logano	Joe Gibbs Racing	Toyota	15
78	Regan Smith	Furniture Row Racing	Chevrolet	16	60	Todd Bodine	Germain Racing	Toyota	16
4	Kasey Kahne	Red Bull Racing Team	Toyota	17	13	Casey Mears	Germain Racing	Toyota	17
47	Bobby Labonte	JTG Daugherty Racing	Toyota	18	77	Steve Wallace	Rusty Wallace Racing	Toyota	18
83	Brian Vickers	Red Bull Racing Team	Toyota	19	7	Robby Gordon	Robby Gordon Motorsports	Dodge	19
97	Kevin Conway	NEMCO Motorsports	Toyota	20	32	Terry Labonte	FAS Lane Racing	Ford	20
34	David Gilliland	Front Row Motorsports	Ford	21	37	Robert Richardson Jr.	Front Row Motorsports	Ford	21
66	Michael McDowell	HP Racing	Toyota	22	11	Denny Hamlin	Joe Gibbs Racing	Toyota	22
46	J. J. Yeley	Whitney Motorsports	Chevrolet	23	64	Derrike Cope	Max Q Motorsports	Toyota	23
71	Andy Lally	TRG Motorsports	Chevrolet	24	92	Brian Keselowski	K-Automotive Motorsports	Dodge	24

== Races ==
The qualifying races for the 2011 Daytona 500 began at 2:00 p.m. Eastern Standard Time and were televised live in the United States on Speed. The conditions on the grid were dry before the race, the air temperature at 70 °F (21 °C) with sunny skies expected. Sonny Gallman began pre-race ceremonies, by delivering the invocation. Next, Johnny Mayo performed the national anthem.

=== Race 1 ===
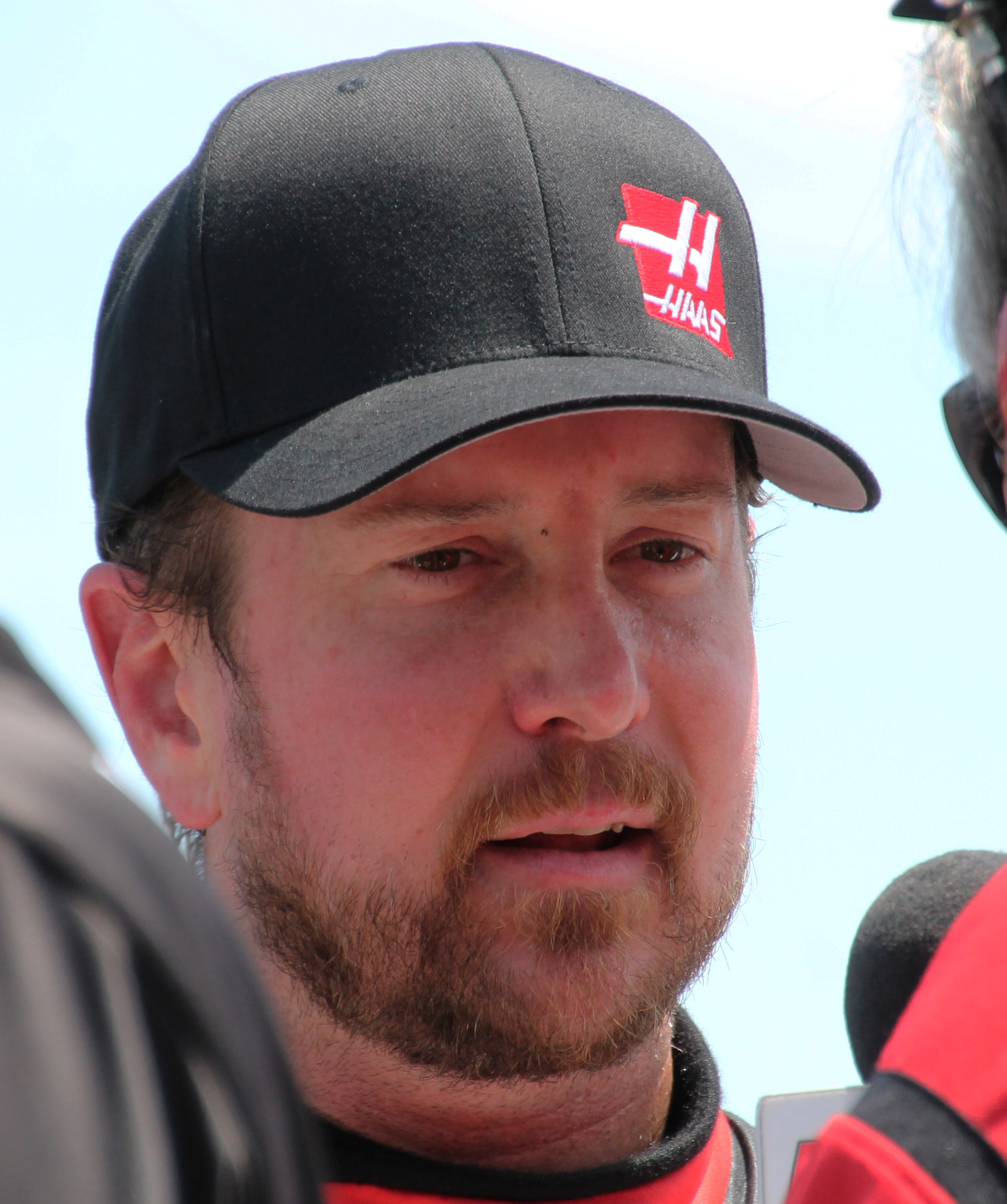
Kurt Busch was the winner after the first Gatorade Duel (pictured in 2015).

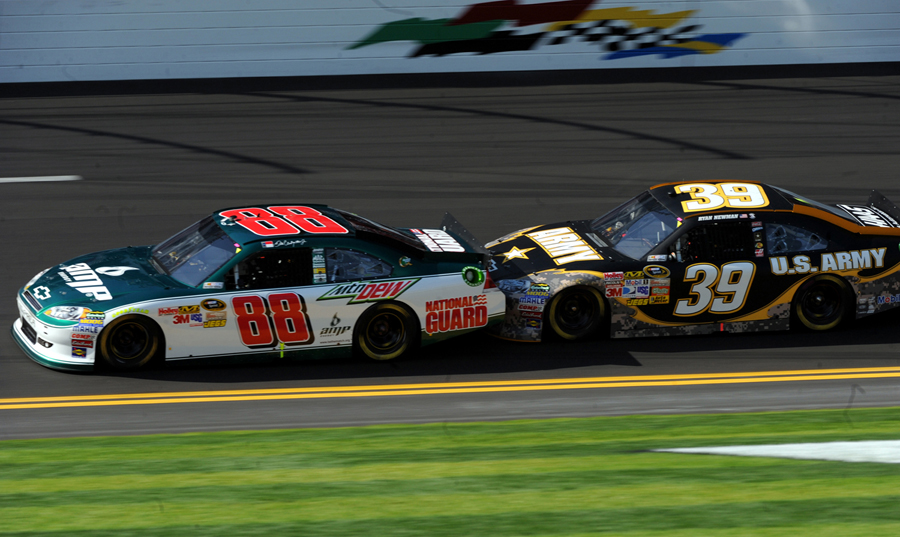
Dale Earnhardt Jr. and Ryan Newman racing in the first race

Following the invocation and the performance of the United States National Anthem, the children of the late sports marketer Ed Shull gave the command for drivers to start their engines. On the pace laps, Johnson, after changing his engine, and teammate Earnhardt, who had to move to a back-up car, had to fall behind all the other drivers in the event after doing major changes during practice. At the start, Newman was the leader going through the first corner, but on the same lap Menard, with pushing assistance from Martin, passed him. On the second lap, the first caution was given because Newman spun sideways in the second turn but avoided impacting the wall. During the caution, he drove to pit road for a pit stop.

At the lap six restart, Menard remained the leader ahead of Martin. On the same lap, Martin became the leader, after having assistance from Stewart. By the ninth lap, Martin and Stewart had a 1.7 second lead over the third position. Two laps later, Earnhardt moved to the tenth position, while Harvick became the leader. On the 22nd lap, Johnson moved up to ninth while Harvick and Kurt Busch switched the first position between them. On the following lap, Kahne became the leader, but after four laps, Harvick reclaimed the first position. However, on the 30th lap, Kahne took the lead from Harvick, only to get it removed by Kurt Busch one lap later. At lap 32, Earnhardt moved up to the ninth position, while Johnson moved up to fifth.

On lap 34, Harvick took the lead from Kurt Busch, but on the same lap, Busch reclaimed the position. On the following lap, Menard was tenth, while A. J. Allmendinger passed Johnson for the fifth position. On lap 38, green flag pit stops began, as Bill Elliott and Brian Vickers made pit stops. On the following lap, most of the drivers made pit stops for fuel. On lap 41, Matt Kenseth and Kurt Busch made pit stops. Two laps later, Kenseth became the leader, with assistance from Harvick. On the 45th lap, Kenseth was the leader, ahead of Harvick, Kahne, Juan Pablo Montoya, and Regan Smith. Seven laps later, Johnson moved up into the eighth position. On lap 56, the second caution was given after Michael McDowell's engine failed. At the lap 60 restart, Kenseth was the leader, but on the final lap, he was passed by Kurt Busch and Smith, who provided Kurt Busch with drafting assistance. Kurt Busch remained the leader to win the race, ahead of Smith, Harvick, and Kenseth. Bill Elliott and Yeley earned transfers to qualify for the Daytona 500. There were two cautions and 20 lead changes among nine different drivers during the course of the race. Harvick's total of 20 laps led was the highest of any competitor. Kurt Busch led five times for a total of seven laps.

=== Race 2 ===
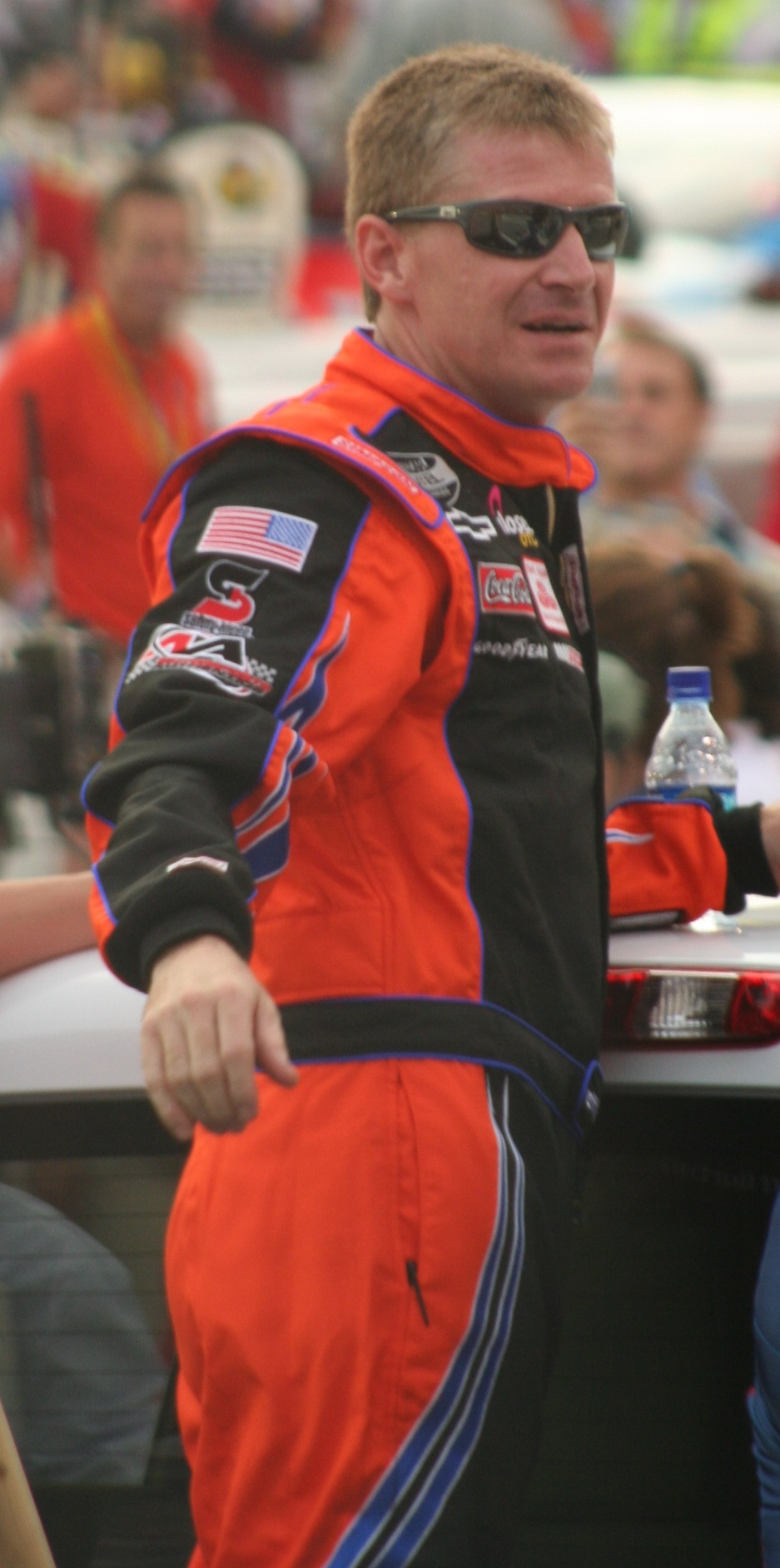
Jeff Burton was the winner after the second Gatorade Duel.

Following the first Gatorade Duel, Murphy Reynolds gave the command for drivers to start their engines. During the pace laps, Casey Mears went to the back of the field because he changed his engine and Truex did the same because he switched to a backup car. At the start, Gordon and Bayne were the leaders. On the first lap, Bowyer became the leader after having assistance from Burton. On the following lap, Jamie McMurray moved into the third position, after drafting with Kyle Busch. On the third lap, the first caution was given because Mears' engine failed. At the lap six restart, Bowyer was the leader, ahead of Burton, Kyle Busch, and Biffle. Two laps later, Busch became the leader. On the 11th lap, Carl Edwards moved up to third, while McMurray moved up to second. Two laps later, Edwards became the leader. On lap 14, Gordon reclaimed the first position, as Bayne moved up to second. On the following lap, the second caution was given after Logano collided into the wall and slid through grass. Most of the drivers made pit stops during the caution. At the lap 20 restart, Edwards was the leader ahead of Kyle Busch.

On the 21st lap, Kyle Busch fell to the ninth position, after having no assistance. Two laps later, Bowyer took the first position, but after two more laps, he was passed by Gordon. At lap 27, Truex, with assistance from Hamlin became the leader for only a lap before Edwards reclaimed the position. Afterward on lap 30, Burton became the leader ahead Biffle and Gordon. Seven laps later, Gordon, with assistance from Bayne became moved into the first and second positions. On the 39th lap, Brad Keselowski spun sideways after losing control of his car, prompting the third caution to come out. He slid through grass but continued without any apparent damage. At the lap 43 restart, Gordon remained in the first position, but on the following lap, Edwards retook the lead. On the 46th lap, Hamlin spun sideways to cause the fourth caution. Edwards remained the leader at the lap 49 restart. Five laps later, the fifth caution was given, after Todd Bodine crashed. With three laps remaining in the race, Burton and Bowyer were in the first two positions. Burton remained the leader to cross the finish line in first, ahead of Bowyer in second. Also on the final lap, there was an accident at behind the front runners. Michael Waltrip finished third, Kyle Busch clinched fourth, and Brian Keselowski driving a five-year old car rounded out the first five positions.

In the end, the following five drivers failed to qualify for the Daytona 500 because they could not finish high enough in their respective Duels or turn a fast enough qualifying lap: Casey Mears, Todd Bodine, Derrike Cope, Kevin Conway, and Michael McDowell. The second race had a record-breaking total of 22 lead changes in the Gatorade Duels among seven different drivers and had five caution periods. Burton's total of 17 laps led was the highest of any competitor.

== Post-race ==
Following the first race, Kurt Busch drove to victory lane. During the press conference, Busch said, "To be in those positions, you have to have a good drafting partner. I had that with Regan Smith [Thursday], had it with [Jamie] McMurray on Saturday night [in the Shootout]. But you can't be in those positions if you don't build a great race car." Also by winning the race, Kurt Busch would be the leader at the start of the Daytona 500, after Earnhardt was involved in an accident. Second-place finisher Smith stated: "Kurt (Busch) and I worked good all day and we had good cars hooked up together. I hope we find each other and do the same thing on Sunday." The first event took 58 minutes and 12 seconds to complete and the margin of victory was 0.065 seconds.

Once the second race was over, Burton drove to victory lane after winning the race. In the next press conference, he said, "It's great to be in Victory Lane but we've got to keep it in perspective that this wasn't the Daytona 500. You want me to tell you what's going to happen on Sunday? We're going to have 400 miles of some stuff happening, but then 100 miles of a lot of things happening. We're going to have six or seven cautions in the last 100 laps, it's going to be a short race to [the] chequered [flag] and that's what's going to happen." The second event took one hour, five minutes and 54 seconds to complete and the margin of victory was 0.005 seconds. A crowd of 80,000 people attended the races. The races had a television audience of 3.303 million people.

=== Race results 1 and 2 ===
Race 1							Race 2						
Pos	Grid	Car	Driver	Team	Manufacturer	Laps	Pos	Grid	Car	Driver	Team	Manufacturer	Laps
1	6	22	Kurt Busch	Penske Racing	Dodge	62	1	4	31	Jeff Burton	Richard Childress Racing	Chevrolet	60
2	16	78	Regan Smith	Furniture Row Racing	Chevrolet	62	2	3	33	Clint Bowyer	Richard Childress Racing	Chevrolet	60
3	9	29	Kevin Harvick	Richard Childress Racing	Chevrolet	62	3	11	15	Michael Waltrip	Michael Waltrip Racing	Toyota	60
4	14	17	Matt Kenseth	Roush Fenway Racing	Ford	62	4	13	18	Kyle Busch	Joe Gibbs Racing	Toyota	60
5	17	4	Kasey Kahne	Red Bull Racing Team	Toyota	62	5	24	92	Brian Keselowski	K-Automotive Motorsports	Dodge	60
6	7	42	Juan Pablo Montoya	Earnhardt Ganassi Racing	Chevrolet	62	6	12	1	Jamie McMurray	Earnhardt Ganassi Racing	Chevrolet	60
7	12	43	A. J. Allmendinger	Richard Petty Motorsports	Ford	62	7	10	2	Brad Keselowski	Penske Racing	Dodge	60
8	4	5	Mark Martin	Hendrick Motorsports	Chevrolet	62	8	22	11	Denny Hamlin	Joe Gibbs Racing	Toyota	60
9	2	27	Paul Menard	Richard Childress Racing	Chevrolet	62	9	14	56	Martin Truex Jr.	Michael Waltrip Racing	Toyota	60
10	3	39	Ryan Newman	Stewart–Haas Racing	Chevrolet	62	10	7	99	Carl Edwards	Roush Fenway Racing	Ford	60
11	10	48	Jimmie Johnson	Hendrick Motorsports	Chevrolet	62	11	9	00	David Reutimann	Michael Waltrip Racing	Toyota	60
12	5	14	Tony Stewart	Stewart–Haas Racing	Chevrolet	62	12	1	24	Jeff Gordon	Hendrick Motorsports	Chevrolet	60
13	1	88	Dale Earnhardt Jr.	Hendrick Motorsports	Chevrolet	62	13	8	38	Travis Kvapil	Front Row Motorsports	Ford	60
14	19	83	Brian Vickers	Red Bull Racing Team	Toyota	62	14	23	64	Derrike Cope	Max Q Motorsports	Toyota	60
15	11	09	Bill Elliott	Phoenix Racing	Chevrolet	62	15	5	16	Greg Biffle	Roush Fenway Racing	Ford	60
16	18	47	Bobby Labonte	JTG Daugherty Racing	Toyota	62	16	21	37	Robert Richardson Jr.	Front Row Motorsports	Ford	60
17	23	46	J. J. Yeley	Whitney Motorsports	Toyota	62	17	19	7	Robby Gordon	Robby Gordon Motorsports	Dodge	60
18	20	97	Kevin Conway	NEMCO Motorsports	Toyota	62	18	20	32	Terry Labonte	FAS Lane Racing	Ford	60
19	13	87	Joe Nemechek	NEMCO Motorsports	Toyota	62	19	2	21	Trevor Bayne	Wood Brothers Racing	Ford	60
20	15	36	Dave Blaney	Tommy Baldwin Racing	Chevrolet	62	20	6	6	David Ragan	Roush Fenway Racing	Ford	60
21	8	9	Marcos Ambrose	Richard Petty Motorsports	Ford	62	21	16	60	Todd Bodine	Germain Racing	Toyota	54
22	24	71	Andy Lally	TRG Motorsports	Chevrolet	60	22	18	77	Steve Wallace	Rusty Wallace Racing	Toyota	54
23	22	66	Michael McDowell	HP Racing	Toyota	53	23	15	20	Joey Logano	Joe Gibbs Racing	Toyota	15
24	21	34	David Gilliland	Front Row Motorsports	Ford	40	24	17	13	Casey Mears	Germain Racing	Toyota	2
