= 2011 AAA 400 =

Race details
- Race 29 of 36 in the 2011 NASCAR Sprint Cup Series
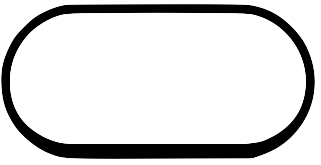
- Layout of Dover International Speedway
- Date: October 2, 2011
- Location: Dover International Speedway, Dover, Delaware
- Course: Permanent racing facility
- Course length: 1.0 miles (1.6 km)
- Distance: 400 laps, 400 mi (643.7 km)
- Weather: Temperatures up to 55 °F (13 °C); wind speeds reaching up to 13 miles per hour (21 km/h)
- Average speed: 119.413 miles per hour (192.177 km/h)

Pole position
Driver	Martin Truex Jr.	Michael Waltrip Racing
- Time: 22.641

Most laps led
Driver	Jimmie Johnson	Hendrick Motorsports
- Laps: 158

Winner
No. 22	Kurt Busch	Penske Racing

Television in the United States
- Network: ESPN
- Announcers: Allen Bestwick, Dale Jarrett and Andy Petree

The 2011 AAA 400 was a NASCAR Cup Series stock car race that was held on October 2, 2011, at Dover International Speedway in Dover, Delaware.

Contested 400 laps on the 1.000-mile (1.609 km) concrete oval, it was the 29th race of the 2011 Sprint Cup Series season, as well as the third race in the ten-race Chase for the Sprint Cup, which ends the season. The race was won by Kurt Busch for the Penske Racing team. Jimmie Johnson finished second, and Carl Edwards clinched third.

A series of racing accidents, coupled with a brief period of rain, led to a high number of cautions during the race. Although the average green flag run was approximately 32 laps, 11% of the race was conducted under a caution flag.

Previous race: 2011 Sylvania 300	Sprint Cup Series; 2011 season	Next race: 2011 Hollywood Casino 400
