= 2011 NASCAR Sprint All-Star Race =

27th iteration of the NASCAR All-Star Race

- Race details
Date	May 21, 2011
Location	Charlotte Motor Speedway in Concord, North Carolina
Course	Permanent racing facility 1.5 mi (2.4 km)
Distance	100 laps, 150 mi (240 km)
Avg Speed	127.841 miles per hour (205.740 km/h)
- Sprint Showdown
Winner	David Ragan, Roush Fenway Racing
- Sprint All-Star Race
Pole position	Kyle Busch, Joe Gibbs Racing
Showdown transfers	David Ragan (Showdown winner); Brad Keselowski (Showdown runner-up); Dale Earnhardt Jr. (Fan vote)
Most laps led	Greg Biffle, Roush Fenway Racing (46)
Winner	Carl Edwards, Roush Fenway Racing
- Television
Network	Speed
Announcers	Mike Joy, Darrell Waltrip and Michael Waltrip

The 2011 NASCAR Sprint Showdown and Sprint All-Star Race was the 27th running of NASCAR's special non-points race involving winners of the 2010 and 2011 NASCAR Sprint Cup Series races through the 2011 FedEx 400 as well as Sprint All-Star Race 2001–2010 winners, when the event was known as "The Winston" and the "Nextel All-Star Challenge", and past Sprint Cup champions from the decade covering 2001 to 2010, including the "Winston Cup" (2001–2003) and "Nextel Cup" (2004–2007) eras. The event was run at the 1.5 miles (2.4 km) Charlotte Motor Speedway in the Charlotte, North Carolina suburb of Concord on May 21, 2011. Speed provided television coverage in the United States while MRN (over-the-air/terrestrial) and Sirius XM Radio (satellite) had radio rights.

== Race format ==
The format of the race was similar to the 2010 event, broken down as follows:

- Segment One - One fifty-lap segment, with a mandatory four-tire green flag pit stop after Lap 25;
- Segment Two - One twenty-lap segment, after which pits were open - drivers could opt to have a pit stop, but could sacrifice their position on the track should they choose to do so.
- Segment Three - Another twenty-lap segment;
- 10-Minute Break period - all cars were allowed to make any adjustments/fuel-except tires;
- All cars left the pit after the ten-minute break period, took the green flag, then re-entered the pits for a mandatory four-tire green flag pit stop.
- Segment Four - A final ten-lap green flag segment.

The qualifying session for eligible drivers consisted of three laps instead of the standard two, including a pit stop after either of the first two laps, slowing to the speed limit of 45 mph entering pit road, but going full throttle as they exit.

== Eligible drivers ==
The following drivers qualified for the race in these categories:

=== Past Series Champion drivers ===
The following five drivers fit into the Past Champions category:

- 14-Tony Stewart (Three-time series champion, most recently 2011)
- 22-Kurt Busch (2004 series champion; also defending race champion)
- 17-Matt Kenseth (2003 series champion)
- 24-Jeff Gordon (Four-time series champion, most recently 2001)
- 5-Jimmie Johnson (Seven-time series champion, most recently 2016)

=== Past All-Star race-winning drivers ===
The following four drivers are eligible as a past winner of the event in the last decade:

- 4-Kasey Kahne (Sprint All-Star Race XXIV winner)
- 29-Kevin Harvick (Sprint All-Star Race XXIII winner)
- 25-Mark Martin (Sprint All-Star Race XXI winner)
- 39-Ryan Newman (Sprint All-Star Race XVIII winner)

=== 2010 or 2011 race winners ===
The following ten drivers are eligible by winning a Sprint Cup points race in 2010 or 2011:

- 18-Kyle Busch (2010 Irwin Tools Night Race)
- 11-Denny Hamlin (2010 AAA Texas 500)
- 1-Jamie McMurray (2010 Brickyard 400)
- 00-David Reutimann (2010 LifeLock.com 400)
- 42-Juan Pablo Montoya (2010 Heluva Good! Sour Cream Dips at the Glen)
- 33-Clint Bowyer (2010 Sylvania 300)
- 99-Carl Edwards (2010 Kobalt Tools 500 (Phoenix))
- 16-Greg Biffle (2010 Sunoco Red Cross Pennsylvania 500)
- 21-Trevor Bayne* (2011 Daytona 500)
- 78-Regan Smith (2011 Showtime Southern 500)

For those not listed above, a special race, The Sprint Showdown, consisting of two halves of 20 laps [30 miles (48 km)] each was held prior to the main event. The top two finishers and a driver chosen by a fan poll were promoted to the main event:

- 6-David Ragan (Winner of Sprint Showdown)
- 2-Brad Keselowski (Runner-up in Sprint Showdown)
- 88-Dale Earnhardt Jr. (Winner of fan vote)

Only winning drivers, not teams, are eligible to race in the All-Star Race; previously a team could qualify for the race even if the driver who won a race for the team was no longer employed by them.

* - Trevor Bayne was scheduled to run in the All Star Race, but the Wood Brothers team withdrew him due to him still recovering from an illness.

== Entry list ==
=== Showdown ===
#	Driver	Team	Make
2	Brad Keselowski	Penske Racing	Dodge
6	David Ragan	Roush Fenway Racing	Ford
09	Landon Cassill	Phoenix Racing	Chevrolet
9	Marcos Ambrose	Richard Petty Motorsports	Ford
13	Casey Mears	Germain Racing	Toyota
20	Joey Logano	Joe Gibbs Racing	Toyota
27	Paul Menard	Richard Childress Racing	Chevrolet
30	David Stremme	Inception Motorsports	Chevrolet
31	Jeff Burton	Richard Childress Racing	Chevrolet
32	Boris Said	FAS Lane Racing	Ford
34	David Gilliland	Front Row Motorsports	Ford
37	Tony Raines	Max Q Motorsports	Ford
38	Travis Kvapil	Front Row Motorsports	Ford
43	A. J. Allmendinger	Richard Petty Motorsports	Ford
47	Bobby Labonte	JTG Daugherty Racing	Toyota
50	T. J. Bell (R)	LTD Powersports, LLC.	Toyota
56	Martin Truex Jr.	Michael Waltrip Racing	Toyota
60	Mike Skinner	Germain Racing	Toyota
64	Derrike Cope	Max Q Motorsports	Ford
66	Todd Bodine	HP Racing	Toyota
71	Andy Lally (R)	TRG Motorsports	Ford
81	J. J. Yeley	Whitney Motorsports	Chevrolet
83	Brian Vickers	Red Bull Racing Team	Toyota
87	Joe Nemechek	NEMCO Motorsports	Toyota
88	Dale Earnhardt Jr.	Hendrick Motorsports	Chevrolet
92	Brian Keselowski	K-Automotive Motorsports	Dodge
95	David Starr	Leavine Family Racing	Ford

=== All-Star Race ===
#	Driver	Team	Make
00	David Reutimann	Michael Waltrip Racing	Toyota
1	Jamie McMurray	Earnhardt Ganassi Racing	Chevrolet
4	Kasey Kahne	Red Bull Racing	Toyota
5	Jimmie Johnson*	Hendrick Motorsports	Chevrolet
11	Denny Hamlin	Joe Gibbs Racing	Toyota
14	Tony Stewart	Stewart–Haas Racing	Chevrolet
16	Greg Biffle	Roush Fenway Racing	Ford
17	Matt Kenseth	Roush Fenway Racing	Ford
18	Kyle Busch	Joe Gibbs Racing	Toyota
22	Kurt Busch	Penske Racing	Dodge
24	Jeff Gordon	Hendrick Motorsports	Chevrolet
25	Mark Martin**	Hendrick Motorsports	Chevrolet
29	Kevin Harvick	Richard Childress Racing	Chevrolet
33	Clint Bowyer	Richard Childress Racing	Chevrolet
39	Ryan Newman	Stewart–Haas Racing	Chevrolet
42	Juan Pablo Montoya	Earnhardt Ganassi Racing	Chevrolet
78	Regan Smith	Furniture Row Racing	Chevrolet
99	Carl Edwards	Roush Fenway Racing	Ford

* - Jimmie Johnson, who usually runs the #48 car, ran the #5 for Lowe's 5% off purchase on their credit card

** - Mark Martin, who usually runs the #5 car, ran the #25 car as a throwback the first #25 car 25 years ago in 1986 driven by Tim Richmond.

== Qualifying ==
=== Showdown ===
Pos.	#	Driver	Team	Make
1	6	David Ragan	Roush Fenway Racing	Ford
2	43	A. J. Allmendinger	Richard Petty Motorsports	Ford
3	27	Paul Menard	Richard Childress Racing	Chevrolet
4	2	Brad Keselowski	Penske Racing	Dodge
5	31	Jeff Burton	Richard Childress Racing	Chevrolet
6	9	Marcos Ambrose	Richard Petty Motorsports	Ford
7	56	Martin Truex Jr.	Michael Waltrip Racing	Toyota
8	34	David Gilliland	Front Row Motorsports	Ford
9	20	Joey Logano	Joe Gibbs Racing	Toyota
10	83	Brian Vickes	Red Bull Racing	Toyota
11	13	Casey Mears	Germain Racing	Toyota
12	60	Mike Skinner	Germain Racing	Toyota
13	88	Dale Earnhardt Jr.	Hendrick Motorsports	Chevrolet
14	47	Bobby Labonte	JTG Daugherty Racing	Toyota
15	09	Landon Cassill	Phoenix Racing	Chevrolet
16	38	Travis Kvapil	Front Row Motorsports	Ford
17	66	Todd Bodine	HP Racing	Toyota
18	81	J. J. Yeley	Whitney Motorsports	Chevrolet
19	87	Joe Nemechek	NEMCO Motorsports	Toyota
20	71	Andy Lally (R)	TRG Motorsports	Ford
21	50	T. J. Bell (R)	LTD Powersports, LLC.	Chevrolet
22	95	David Starr	Leavine Family Racing	Ford
23	37	Tony Raines	Max Q Motorsports	Ford
24	32	Boris Said	FAS Lane Racing	Ford
25	64	Derrike Cope	Max Q Motorsports	Ford
26	30	David Stremme	Inception Motorsports	Chevrolet
27	92	Brian Keselowski	K-Automotive Motorsports	Chevrolet

=== All-Star Race ===
Pos.	#	Driver	Team	Make
1	18	Kyle Busch	Joe Gibbs Racing	Toyota
2	33	Clint Bowyer	Richard Childress Racing	Chevrolet
3	16	Greg Biffle	Roush Fenway Racing	Ford
4	99	Carl Edwards	Roush Fenway Racing	Ford
5	25	Mark Martin	Hendrick Motorsports	Chevrolet
6	14	Tony Stewart	Stewart–Haas Racing	Chevrolet
7	4	Kasey Kahne	Red Bull Racing	Toyota
8	42	Juan Pablo Montoya	Earnhardt Ganassi Racing	Chevrolet
9	1	Jamie McMurray	Earnhardt Ganassi Racing	Chevrolet
10	39	Ryan Newman	Stewart–Haas Racing	Chevrolet
11	5	Jimmie Johnson	Hendrick Motorsports	Chevrolet
12	24	Jeff Gordon	Hendrick Motorsports	Chevrolet
13	17	Matt Kenseth	Roush Fenway Racing	Ford
14	29	Kevin Harvick	Richard Childress Racing	Chevrolet
15	11	Denny Hamlin	Joe Gibbs Racing	Toyota
16	22	Kurt Busch	Penske Racing	Dodge
17	78	Regan Smith	Furniture Row Racing	Chevrolet
18	00	David Reutimann	Michael Waltrip Racing	Toyota
19	6	David Ragan*	Roush Fenway Racing	Ford
20	2	Brad Keselowski**	Penske Racing	Dodge
21	88	Dale Earnhardt Jr.***	Hendrick Motorsports	Chevrolet

* - Won the Showdown

** - Showdown runner up

*** - Fan Vote winner

== Results ==
=== Showdown ===
Pos.	#	Driver	Team	Make	Laps	Led	Status
1	6	David Ragan	Roush Fenway Racing	Ford	40	22	running
2	2	Brad Keselowski	Penske Racing	Dodge	40	18	running
3	9	Marcos Ambrose	Richard Petty Motorsports	Ford	40	0	running
4	43	A. J. Allmendinger	Richard Petty Motorsports	Ford	40	0	running
5	20	Joey Logano	Joe Gibbs Racing	Toyota	40	0	running
6	88	Dale Earnhardt Jr.	Hendrick Motorsports	Chevrolet	40	0	running
7	34	David Gilliland	Front Row Motorsports	Ford	40	0	running
8	47	Bobby Labonte	JTG Daugherty Racing	Toyota	40	0	running
9	31	Jeff Burton	Richard Childress Racing	Chevrolet	40	0	running
10	83	Brian Vickers	Red Bull Racing	Toyota	40	0	running
11	27	Paul Menard	Richard Childress Racing	Chevrolet	40	0	running
12	13	Casey Mears	Germain Racing	Toyota	40	0	running
13	56	Martin Truex Jr.	Michael Waltrip Racing	Toyota	40	0	running
14	81	J. J. Yeley	Whitney Motorsports	Chevrolet	40	0	running
15	60	Mike Skinner	Germain Racing	Toyota	40	0	running
16	38	Travis Kvapil	Front Row Motorsports	Ford	40	0	running
17	66	Todd Bodine	HP Racing	Toyota	40	0	running
18	50	T. J. Bell (R)	LTD Powersports, LLC.	Chevrolet	40	0	running
19	87	Joe Nemechek	NEMCO Motorsports	Toyota	40	0	running
20	92	Brian Keselowski	K-Automotive Motorsports	Chevrolet	40	0	running
21	37	Tony Raines	Max Q Motorsports	Ford	40	0	running
22	95	David Starr	Leavine Family Racing	Ford	29	0	ignition
23	71	Andy Lally (R)	TRG Motorsports	Ford	28	0	running
24	30	David Stremme	Inception Motorsports	Chevrolet	27	0	crash
25	32	Boris Said	FAS Lane Racing	Ford	3	0	crash
26	09	Landon Cassill	Phoenix Racing	Chevrolet	2	0	crash
27	64	Derrike Cope	Max Q Motorsports	Ford	2	0	crash

=== All-Star Race ===
Pos.	No.	Driver	Team	Make	Laps	Led	Status
1	99	Carl Edwards	Roush Fenway Racing	Ford	100	29	running
2	18	Kyle Busch	Joe Gibbs Racing	Toyota	100	19	running
3	00	David Reutimann	Michael Waltrip Racing	Toyota	100	0	running
4	14	Tony Stewart	Stewart–Haas Racing	Chevrolet	100	0	running
5	16	Greg Biffle	Roush Fenway Racing	Ford	100	46	running
6	17	Matt Kenseth	Roush Fenway Racing	Ford	100	0	running
7	11	Denny Hamlin	Joe Gibbs Racing	Toyota	100	0	running
8	6	David Ragan	Roush Fenway Racing	Ford	100	0	running
9	29	Kevin Harvick	Richard Childress Racing	Chevrolet	100	0	running
10	39	Ryan Newman	Stewart–Haas Racing	Chevrolet	100	0	running
11	5	Jimmie Johnson	Hendrick Motorsports	Chevrolet	100	6	running
12	42	Juan Pablo Montoya	Earnhardt Ganassi Racing	Chevrolet	100	0	running
13	22	Kurt Busch	Penske Racing	Dodge	100	0	running
14	88	Dale Earnhardt Jr.	Hendrick Motorsports	Chevrolet	100	0	running
15	24	Jeff Gordon	Hendrick Motorsports	Chevrolet	100	0	running
16	33	Clint Bowyer	Richard Childress Racing	Chevrolet	100	0	running
17	1	Jamie McMurray	Earnhardt Ganassi Racing	Chevrolet	100	0	running
18	2	Brad Keselowski	Penske Racing	Dodge	99	0	running
19	25	Mark Martin	Hendrick Motorsports	Chevrolet	93	0	crash
20	78	Regan Smith	Furniture Row Racing	Chevrolet	90	0	fuel pump
21	4	Kasey Kahne	Red Bull Racing	Toyota	59	0	crash

== Other events ==
=== Induction of the 2011 Class to the NASCAR Hall of Fame ===
The formal inductions for the second class of the NASCAR Hall of Fame, made up of Bobby Allison, Ned Jarrett, Bud Moore, David Pearson, and Lee Petty, was held the day after the race on Sunday, May 22. This became the last year the inductions will take place in May; beginning in 2012, the ceremonies will be held in January following a June election.

=== Craftsman All-Star Pit Crew Challenge ===
The annual Craftsman All-Star Pit Crew Challenge competition was held on the Thursday prior to the race at the Time Warner Cable Arena in Charlotte. The #11 Joe Gibbs Racing team, led by Mike Ford, won the competition over the #48 of Hendrick Motorsports. As a result, the #11, driven by Denny Hamlin, received the first selection of pit stalls for the All-Star Race.
