= 2011 NASCAR Sprint Cup Series =

American motorsport season

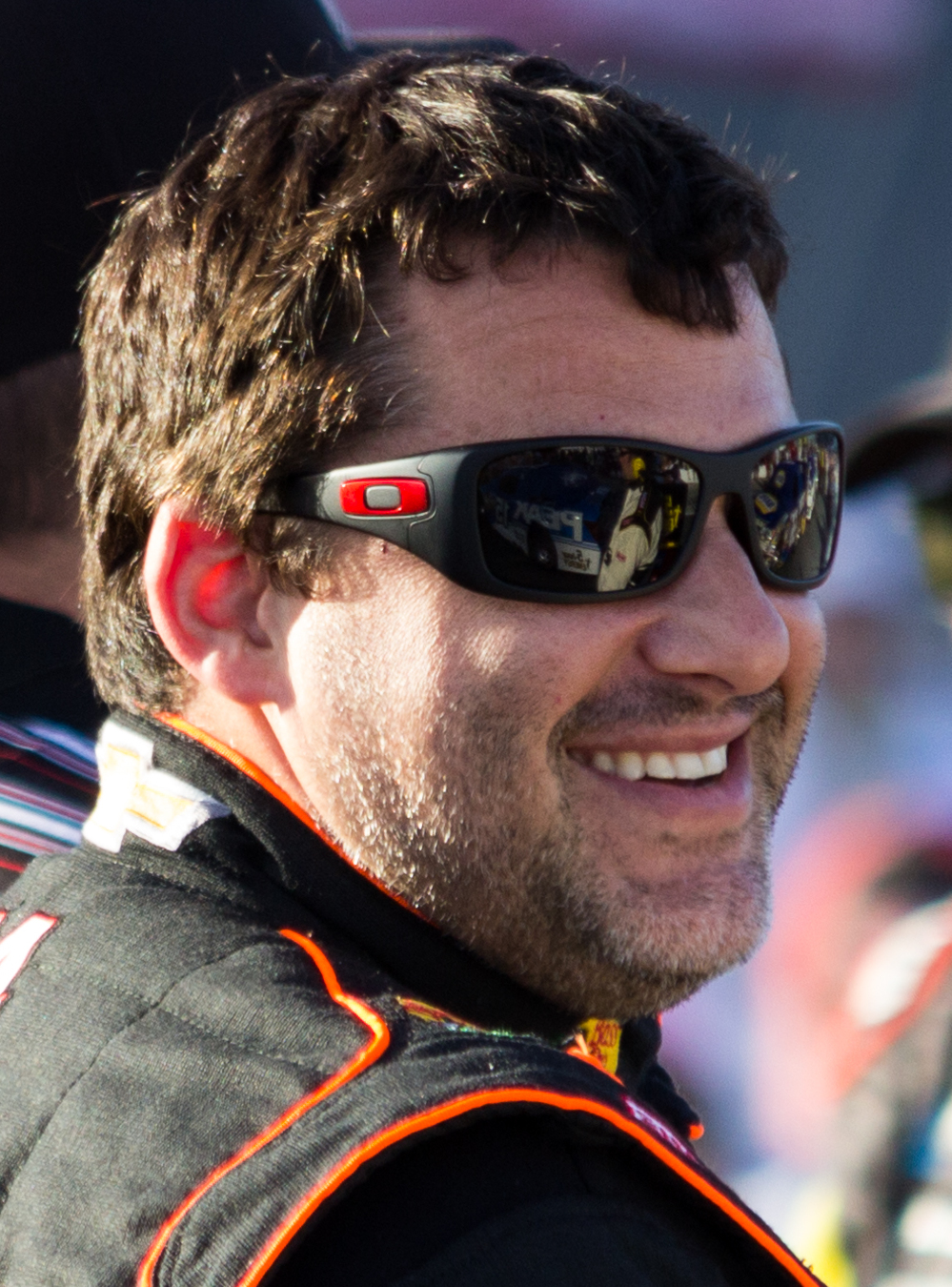
Tony Stewart, the 2011 Sprint Cup Series champion.

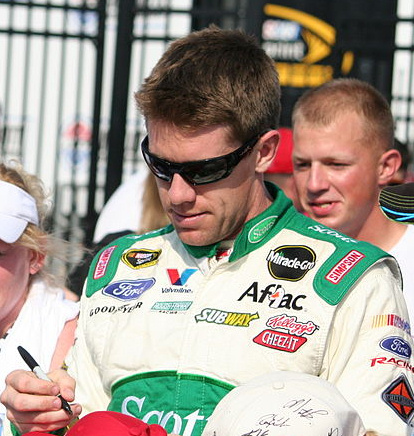
Carl Edwards finished second in the championship, losing the tie breaker to champion Tony Stewart.

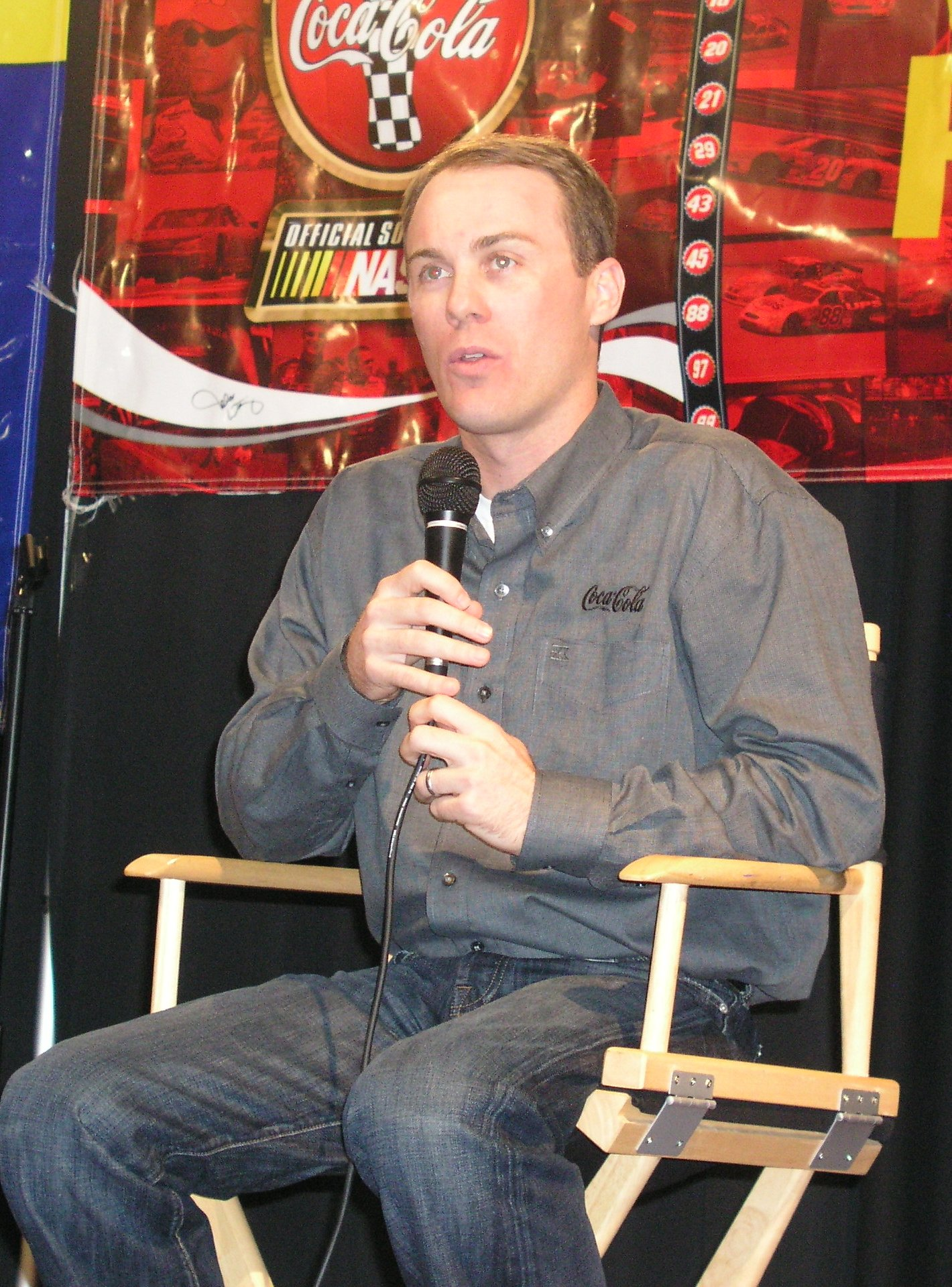
Kevin Harvick finished third in the championship, 58 points back.

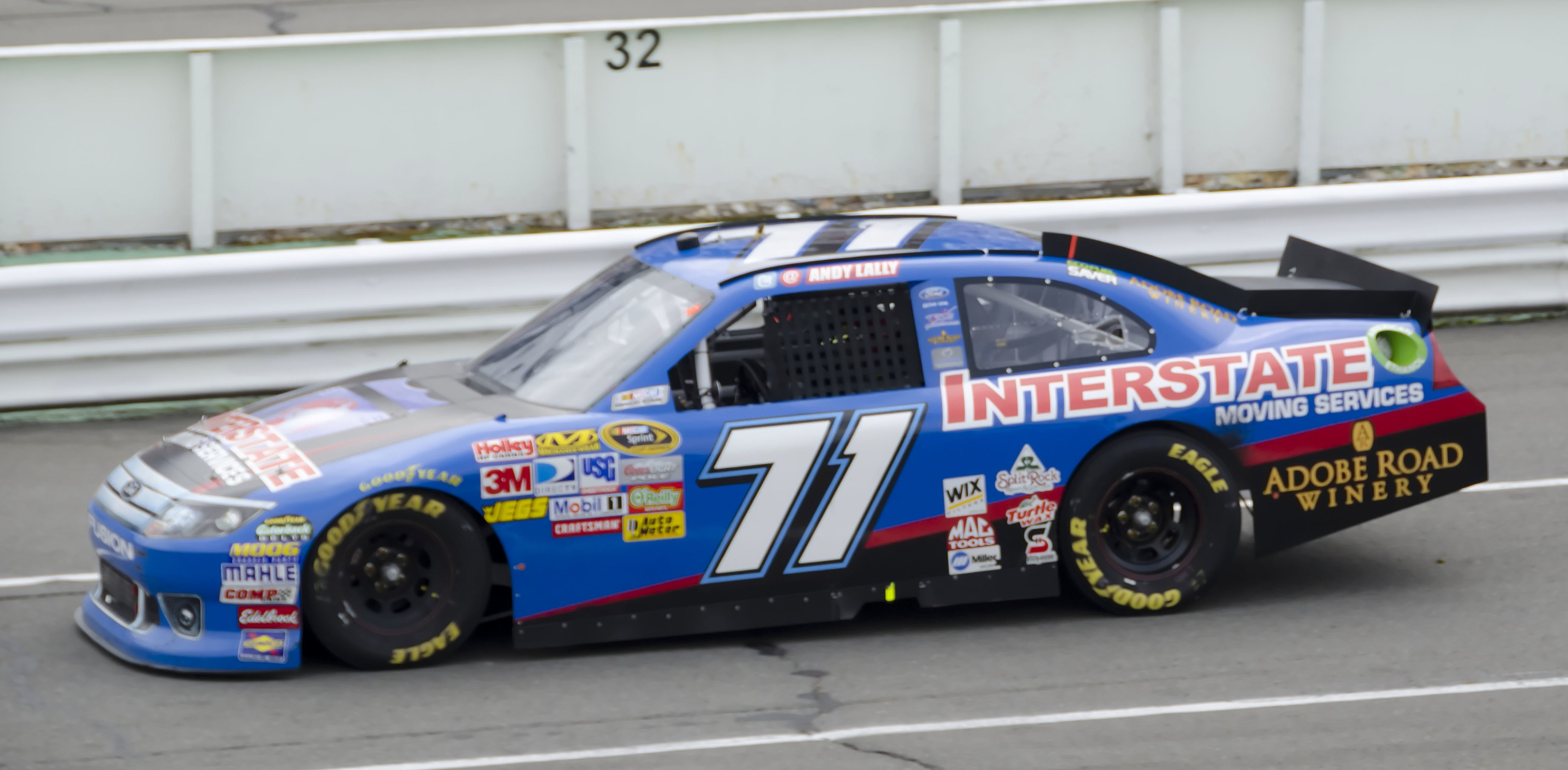
Andy Lally's car at Pocono Raceway, he won the Rookie of the Year.

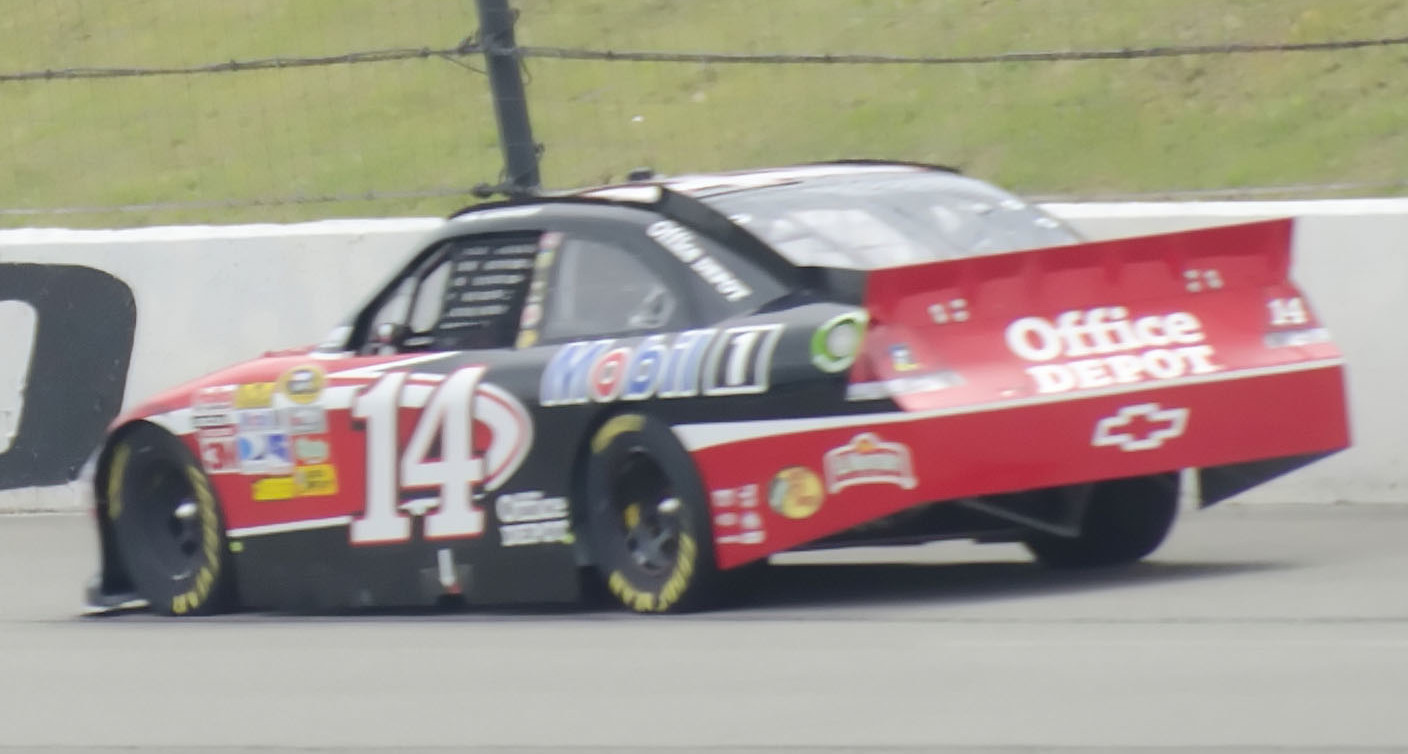
Chevrolet won the Manufacturer's championship with 18 wins & 248 points.

The 2011 NASCAR Sprint Cup Series was the 63rd season of professional stock car racing in the United States and the 40th modern-era Cup series season. The season included 36 races and two exhibition races, beginning with the Daytona 500 at Daytona International Speedway and ending with the Ford 400 at Homestead-Miami Speedway. The final ten races were known as 2011 Chase for the Sprint Cup.

The 2011 season is often considered to be one of the greatest and most exciting seasons in Cup Series history. It had the closest points battle in history, with Tony Stewart winning the Drivers' Championship with a victory at the final race of the season in a tiebreaker over Carl Edwards due to having five wins on the season vs. Edwards' one win. Stewart, after barely making the Chase that year and having zero wins when the postseason began, went on to win five of the final ten races and then the title over Edwards, who led the points for most of the year despite only scoring one win early in the season at the Las Vegas. There were eighteen different race winners, the most since 2002. There were also five first-time Cup Series winners. Trevor Bayne, the first of these five, won the Daytona 500 in just his second career Cup race. The other first-time winners were Regan Smith at Darlington, David Ragan at Daytona in July, Paul Menard at Indianapolis, and Marcos Ambrose at Watkins Glen. These races are some of the most prestigious on the schedule.

During the 2010 season, NASCAR announced several calendar changes for 2011, including race additions at Kansas Speedway and Kentucky Speedway, and the removal of one race each from Atlanta Motor Speedway and Auto Club Speedway. Once the 2010 season had concluded, NASCAR also announced changes to the point system, and that the fuel changed from Sunoco unleaded to an ethanol blend called 'Sunoco Green E15'.

In addition, Stewart–Haas Racing, owned by Stewart and Gene Haas, won the Owners' Championship, while Chevrolet won their ninth-consecutive Manufacturers' Championship with 248 points. Stewart became the first owner-driver to win a Cup title since Alan Kulwicki in 1992.

This was the final season Cup cars would use carburetors in the engines which goes back to the NASCAR Cups first season in 1949. In 2012 the series would shift to fuel injection.

== Teams and drivers ==
=== Complete schedule ===
There were 41 full-time teams in 2011.

Manufacturer	Team	No.	Race driver	Crew chief
Chevrolet	Earnhardt Ganassi Racing	1	Jamie McMurray	Kevin Manion
Chevrolet	Earnhardt Ganassi Racing	42	Juan Pablo Montoya	Brian Pattie 19; Jim Pohlman 17
Chevrolet	Furniture Row Racing	78	Regan Smith	Pete Rondeau 35; Mike Hillman 1
Chevrolet	Hendrick Motorsports	5	Mark Martin	Lance McGrew
Chevrolet	Hendrick Motorsports	24	Jeff Gordon	Alan Gustafson
Chevrolet	Hendrick Motorsports	48	Jimmie Johnson	Chad Knaus
Chevrolet	Hendrick Motorsports	88	Dale Earnhardt Jr.	Steve Letarte
Chevrolet	Phoenix Racing	51	Bill Elliott 4	Nick Harrison
Chevrolet	Phoenix Racing	51	Landon Cassill 29	Nick Harrison
Chevrolet	Phoenix Racing	51	Boris Said 2	Nick Harrison
Chevrolet	Phoenix Racing	51	Mike Bliss 1	Nick Harrison
Chevrolet	Richard Childress Racing	27	Paul Menard	Slugger Labbe
Chevrolet	Richard Childress Racing	29	Kevin Harvick	Gil Martin
Chevrolet	Richard Childress Racing	31	Jeff Burton	Todd Berrier 19; Luke Lambert 17
Chevrolet	Richard Childress Racing	33	Clint Bowyer	Shane Wilson
Chevrolet	Stewart–Haas Racing	14	Tony Stewart	Darian Grubb
Chevrolet	Stewart–Haas Racing	39	Ryan Newman	Tony Gibson
Chevrolet	Tommy Baldwin Racing	36	Dave Blaney 30	Kevin Buskirk 24; Joe Williams 1 Philippe Lopez 11
Chevrolet	Tommy Baldwin Racing	36	Ron Fellows 1	Kevin Buskirk 24; Joe Williams 1 Philippe Lopez 11
Chevrolet	Tommy Baldwin Racing	36	Mike Skinner 1	Kevin Buskirk 24; Joe Williams 1 Philippe Lopez 11
Chevrolet	Tommy Baldwin Racing	36	Stephen Leicht 1	Kevin Buskirk 24; Joe Williams 1 Philippe Lopez 11
Chevrolet	Tommy Baldwin Racing	36	Geoff Bodine 3	Kevin Buskirk 24; Joe Williams 1 Philippe Lopez 11
Dodge	Penske Racing	2	Brad Keselowski	Paul Wolfe
Dodge	Penske Racing	22	Kurt Busch	Steve Addington
Dodge	Robby Gordon Motorsports	7	Robby Gordon 25	Steven Lane 5 Samuel Stanley 31
Dodge	Robby Gordon Motorsports	7	Scott Wimmer 4	Steven Lane 5 Samuel Stanley 31
Dodge	Robby Gordon Motorsports	7	Johnny Sauter 2	Steven Lane 5 Samuel Stanley 31
Dodge	Robby Gordon Motorsports	7	Reed Sorenson 5	Steven Lane 5 Samuel Stanley 31
Ford	FAS Lane Racing	32	Terry Labonte 6	Frank Stoddard
Ford	FAS Lane Racing	32	Mike Skinner 2	Frank Stoddard
Ford	FAS Lane Racing	32	Ken Schrader 8	Frank Stoddard
Ford	FAS Lane Racing	32	Mike Bliss 16	Frank Stoddard
Ford	FAS Lane Racing	32	Patrick Carpentier 1	Frank Stoddard
Ford	FAS Lane Racing	32	Jason White 1	Frank Stoddard
Ford	FAS Lane Racing	32	Andrew Ranger 1	Frank Stoddard
Ford	FAS Lane Racing	32	T. J. Bell (R) 1	Frank Stoddard
Ford	Front Row Motorsports	34	David Gilliland	Peter Sospenzo
Ford	Front Row Motorsports	38	Travis Kvapil 26	Bill Henderson 3 Derrick Finley 1 Jay Guy 32
Ford	Front Row Motorsports	38	Sam Hornish Jr. 1	Bill Henderson 3 Derrick Finley 1 Jay Guy 32
Ford	Front Row Motorsports	38	Tony Ave 1	Bill Henderson 3 Derrick Finley 1 Jay Guy 32
Ford	Front Row Motorsports	38	J. J. Yeley 7	Bill Henderson 3 Derrick Finley 1 Jay Guy 32
Ford	Front Row Motorsports	38	Terry Labonte 1	Bill Henderson 3 Derrick Finley 1 Jay Guy 32
Ford	Front Row Motorsports	37	Robert Richardson Jr. 1	Greg Conner 20; Mike Abner 16
Ford	Max Q Motorsports	37	Tony Raines 19	Greg Conner 20; Mike Abner 16
Ford	Max Q Motorsports	37	Chris Cook 1	Greg Conner 20; Mike Abner 16
Ford	Max Q Motorsports	37	Scott Speed 3	Greg Conner 20; Mike Abner 16
Ford	Max Q Motorsports	37	Jeff Green 1	Greg Conner 20; Mike Abner 16
Ford	Max Q Motorsports	37	Erik Darnell 1	Greg Conner 20; Mike Abner 16
Ford	Max Q Motorsports	37	Josh Wise 6	Greg Conner 20; Mike Abner 16
Ford	Max Q Motorsports	37	Mike Skinner 4	Greg Conner 20; Mike Abner 16
Ford	Richard Petty Motorsports	9	Marcos Ambrose	Todd Parrott
Ford	Richard Petty Motorsports	43	A. J. Allmendinger	Mike Shiplett 19; Greg Erwin 17
Ford	Roush Fenway Racing	6	David Ragan	Drew Blickensderfer
Ford	Roush Fenway Racing	16	Greg Biffle	Greg Erwin 18; Matt Puccia 18
Ford	Roush Fenway Racing	17	Matt Kenseth	Jimmy Fennig
Ford	Roush Fenway Racing	99	Carl Edwards	Bob Osborne
Toyota	Germain Racing	13	Casey Mears	Bootie Barker
Toyota	HP Racing	66	Michael McDowell 33	Gene Nead
Toyota	HP Racing	66	Todd Bodine 2	Gene Nead
Toyota	HP Racing	66	Josh Wise 1	Gene Nead
Toyota	Joe Gibbs Racing	11	Denny Hamlin	Mike Ford
Toyota	Joe Gibbs Racing	18	Kyle Busch 35	Dave Rogers
Toyota	Joe Gibbs Racing	18	Michael McDowell 1	Dave Rogers
Toyota	Joe Gibbs Racing	20	Joey Logano	Greg Zipadelli
Toyota	JTG Daugherty Racing	47	Bobby Labonte	Frank Kerr 32; Brian Burns 4
Toyota	Michael Waltrip Racing	00	David Reutimann	Rodney Childers 32; Bobby Kennedy 4
Toyota	Michael Waltrip Racing	56	Martin Truex Jr.	Pat Tryson 14; Chad Johnston 19; Scott Miller 3
Toyota	NEMCO Motorsports	87	Joe Nemechek	Philippe Lopez 17; Steven Gray 18; Bill Wilburn 1
Toyota	Red Bull Racing	4	Kasey Kahne	Kenny Francis
Toyota	Red Bull Racing	83	Brian Vickers	Ryan Pemberton
Ford Chevrolet	Whitney Motorsports	46	J. J. Yeley 16	Tony Furr
Ford Chevrolet	Whitney Motorsports	46	Bill Elliott 1	Tony Furr
Ford Chevrolet	Whitney Motorsports	46	Andy Pilgrim 1	Tony Furr
Ford Chevrolet	Whitney Motorsports	46	Erik Darnell 4	Tony Furr
Ford Chevrolet	Whitney Motorsports	46	Brian Simo 1	Tony Furr
Ford Chevrolet	Whitney Motorsports	46	Scott Speed 13	Tony Furr
Ford Chevrolet	TRG Motorsports	71	Andy Lally (R) 32	Jay Guy 4 Paul Clapprood 4 Doug Richert 28
Ford Chevrolet	TRG Motorsports	71	Hermie Sadler 3	Jay Guy 4 Paul Clapprood 4 Doug Richert 28
Ford Chevrolet	TRG Motorsports	71	Mike Bliss 1	Jay Guy 4 Paul Clapprood 4 Doug Richert 28

=== Limited schedule ===
Manufacturer	Team	No.	Race driver	Crew chief	Rounds
Chevrolet	Curb-Agajanian Performance Group	98	Austin Dillon	Danny Stockman Jr.	1
Chevrolet	Inception Motorsports	30	David Stremme	Steven Lane	23
Chevrolet	Sinica Motorsports	93	Grant Enfinger	Allen Wellman	1
Chevrolet	Tommy Baldwin Racing	35	Steve Park	Kevin Buskirk 1 Tommy Baldwin Jr. 2 Joe Cipriano 10	2
Chevrolet	Tommy Baldwin Racing	35	Geoff Bodine	Kevin Buskirk 1 Tommy Baldwin Jr. 2 Joe Cipriano 10	5
Chevrolet	Tommy Baldwin Racing	35	Dave Blaney	Kevin Buskirk 1 Tommy Baldwin Jr. 2 Joe Cipriano 10	5
Chevrolet	Tommy Baldwin Racing	35	Stephen Leicht	Kevin Buskirk 1 Tommy Baldwin Jr. 2 Joe Cipriano 10	1
Dodge	Robby Gordon Motorsports	77	Scott Wimmer	Patrick Donahue	2
Dodge	Robby Gordon Motorsports	77	P. J. Jones	Patrick Donahue	2
Dodge	Robby Gordon Motorsports	77	Robby Gordon	Patrick Donahue	1
Dodge	Stratus Racing Group	75	Derrike Cope	Dave Fuge	1
Ford	FAS Lane Racing	23	Terry Labonte	Frank Stoddard	1
Ford	Wood Brothers Racing	21	Trevor Bayne	Donnie Wingo	17
Ford	Wood Brothers Racing	21	Ricky Stenhouse Jr.	Donnie Wingo	1
Ford	TRG Motorsports	77	Andy Lally	Todd Anderson	1
Ford	TRG Motorsports	77	T. J. Bell	Barry Boeckenstedt	1
Ford	Front Row Motorsports	55	Jeff Green	Derrick Finley	1
Ford	Front Row Motorsports	55	J. J. Yeley	Derrick Finley	11
Ford	Front Row Motorsports	55	Travis Kvapil	Derrick Finley	6
Ford	Leavine Family Racing	95	David Starr	Wally Rogers	8
Toyota	Max Q Motorsports	64	Derrike Cope	Dave Fuge	1
Toyota	Michael Waltrip Racing	15	Michael Waltrip	Bobby Kennedy	4
Toyota	NEMCO Motorsports	97	Kevin Conway	Mike Boerschinger 1 Scott Eggleston 3	4
Toyota	Red Bull Racing Team	84	Cole Whitt	Randy Cox	2
Toyota	R3 Motorsports	23	Scott Riggs	Greg Conner	1
Toyota	Rusty Wallace Racing	77	Steve Wallace	Larry Carter	1
Dodge Chevrolet	K-Automotive Motorsports	92	Brian Keselowski	Bob Keselowski	6
Dodge Chevrolet	K-Automotive Motorsports	92	Dennis Setzer	Bob Keselowski	3
Dodge Chevrolet	K-Automotive Motorsports	92	Scott Riggs	Bob Keselowski	1
Toyota Chevrolet	Germain Racing	60	Todd Bodine	Buddy Sisco 7 Mike Abner 4 Tom Ackerman 18	2
Toyota Chevrolet	Germain Racing	60	Landon Cassill	Buddy Sisco 7 Mike Abner 4 Tom Ackerman 18	3
Toyota Chevrolet	Germain Racing	60	Mike Skinner	Buddy Sisco 7 Mike Abner 4 Tom Ackerman 18	23
Toyota Chevrolet	Germain Racing	60	Dave Blaney	Buddy Sisco 7 Mike Abner 4 Tom Ackerman 18	1
Toyota Chevrolet	LTD Powersports, LLC.	50	T. J. Bell	Jeff McClure	13
Ford Chevrolet	Whitney Motorsports	81	Scott Riggs	Butch Lamoreux 2 Mike Abner 7	8
Ford Chevrolet	Whitney Motorsports	81	Brian Simo	Butch Lamoreux 2 Mike Abner 7	1

=== Team changes ===
In preparation for 2011, Penske Racing made team changes by moving Brad Keselowski, along with his No. 12 team, into the No. 2 Miller Lite car, replacing Kurt Busch and his 2010 team, who moved to the newly formed No. 22 Shell/Pennzoil car. Another change was made by Hendrick Motorsports, who rearranged three of the four-car team. The team moved Steve Letarte with Dale Earnhardt Jr., Alan Gustafson with Jeff Gordon, and Lance McGrew with Mark Martin. On January 7, 2011, Bob Leavine and Lance Fenton announced the formation of Leavine Fenton Racing, and that David Starr drove for the team. In February, another team was formed, FAS Lane Racing, by Frank Stoddard. In March, David Stremme announced his return to the Cup Series with a new team, Inception Motorsports. They ran the No. 30 Chevrolet and attempted to make the spring race at Richmond. In October before the Bank of America 500, it was announced that Sinica Motorsports would join the Cup Series for 3 races in 2011, running the No. 93 Chevrolet with either Bill Elliott or Terry Labonte and that ARCA driver Grant Enfinger would drive for the team for 10–15 races in 2012. (The team ended up only attempting the season-finale at Homestead with Enfinger in 2011, which they failed to qualify for, and no races in 2012.)

Another new team for 2011, America's Racing Team, was scheduled to debut in the Daytona 500 with their No. 76 Chevrolet. The team was formed in 2010 before the July race at Daytona. The team was unique because fans could pay between $44.95 to $1,999.95 to own a portion of it. However, AMR was unable to get off the ground and they did not attempt any races.

=== Driver changes ===
==== Changed teams ====
Several drivers changed teams for the season. One of which was Paul Menard, who left Richard Petty Motorsports to drive for Richard Childress Racing. Menard signed a three-year deal to expire at the end of 2013, with options for further years. Other changes were Kasey Kahne who joined the Red Bull Racing Team, after leaving Richard Petty Motorsports in 2010, and Marcos Ambrose who left JTG Daugherty Racing to drive for Richard Petty Motorsports in 2011, as a replacement for Kahne. Also, Bobby Labonte replaced Ambrose at JTG Daugherty Racing, and Bill Elliott, who moved from Wood Brothers Racing to Phoenix Racing. Kevin Conway, the 2010 NASCAR Rookie of the Year in the Sprint Cup Series, also made a change by moving to NEMCO Motorsports.

==== Entered the series ====
For the 2011 season, Trevor Bayne, who placed seventh in the 2010 NASCAR Nationwide Series season, entered the series driving for Wood Brothers Racing in 17 scheduled races. Another driver, Brian Keselowski also entered the series, after qualifying for the 2011 Daytona 500 for the K-Automotive Motorsports team.

==== Exited the series ====
Some drivers left the series, such as Elliott Sadler who left Richard Petty Motorsports to drive for Kevin Harvick Incorporated in the Camping World Truck Series and Nationwide Series. Sam Hornish Jr. also exited the series and moved to the Nationwide Series to participate in ten races, after new sponsorship for his Sprint Cup Series car could not be found. After the final race of the 2010 season, Scott Speed exited the series after Red Bull Racing Team dismissed him to make room for Kahne. The change resulted in Speed filing a lawsuit against the team for several reasons.

==== Mid-season changes ====
During July 2011, Max Q Motorsports announced that Scott Speed signed a three race contract with the team to race at Indianapolis Motor Speedway, Watkins Glen International and Pocono Raceway. Following the announcement, Speed commented, "I am excited to get back to the track. Max Q Motorsports seems to have a good operation and a great group of guys. Ford has a great engine package, so I'm hopeful that we can get the ball rolling quickly and be competitive out the gate. "

=== Rookie entries ===
At the beginning of the season, two drivers announced plans to participate in the 2011 Rookie of the Year standings. The drivers were Andy Lally driving for Kevin Buckler's TRG Motorsports, and Brian Keselowski, moving his family-operated K-Automotive Motorsports team up from the Nationwide Series. Trevor Bayne, who was running half the season with the Wood Brothers, did not participate in the standings after deciding to participate for the Nationwide Series championship. T. J. Bell entered later in the season and collected his first Cup points at Pocono. As Lally was the only rookie driver to run the required 17 races to keep eligibility, he won the rookie award easily despite being released from TRG before Homestead.

== Changes ==
=== Rule changes ===
After the 2010 season, the catch can man, who caught excess fuel during pit stops and adjusts the track bar, is no longer needed, because of the addition of a self-venting fuel can. On January 11, 2011, NASCAR reported drivers can only be able to compete for the championship in one of NASCAR's three national racing series, which means the drivers who race in multiple series, most notably in the Cup and Nationwide Series, are able to compete in the races, but not for the championship.

The rule does not affect the exemption rule, as exemptions are determined by the top 35 in NASCAR car owner points. Drivers ineligible for Sprint Cup driver points earned Sprint Cup owner points for their team.

An announcement came on January 26, 2011, when Brian France announced that the winner of the race, excluding bonus points would receive 43 points, and each position lost one point from the position before, so that the first position would receive 43 points, while second would receive 42. For bonus points, if the driver leads a lap they receive one, if they lead the most laps they receive one more, and if they win the race they receive three more points. On the same day, France announced changes to the qualifying format, such as the qualifying order being set by practice speeds from slowest to highest. If qualifying is canceled, the grid would be determined by practice speeds, unless they are also cancelled, then they lined up by Drivers' points. In the press conference, it was also noted that in the Chase for the Sprint Cup, the eleventh and twelfth positions would be awarded to whoever has the most victories who are ranked from 11th to 20th in regular-season driver's points. Those drivers would not be given bonus points for wins. In addition, the number of base points received by Chase drivers at the points reset were set at 2,000 instead of the previous 5,000.

=== Other changes ===
During the 2010 season through the off-season, NASCAR announced a change to the front end of the race cars. The change removed the splitter braces, and made it a single molded piece. The fuel for all major series in NASCAR changed from Sunoco unleaded to an ethanol blend called 'Sunoco Green E15'. But during the rest of the season on August 23, Toyota unveiled the new Camry at Paramount Studios, Hollywood, California and the teams changed their headlights, taillights, fog lights, and rear for the rest of the season.

== Schedule ==
On August 18, 2010, the final calendar was released containing 36 races, with the addition of two exhibition races. The schedule also includes two Gatorade Duels, which are the qualifying races for the Daytona 500.

No.	Race title	Track	Date	Time (ET)
	Budweiser Shootout	Daytona International Speedway, Daytona Beach	February 12	8:00 PM
	Gatorade Duel	Daytona International Speedway, Daytona Beach	February 17	2:00 PM
1	Daytona 500	Daytona International Speedway, Daytona Beach	February 20	1:00 PM
2	Subway Fresh Fit 500	Phoenix International Raceway, Phoenix	February 27	3:00 PM
3	Kobalt Tools 400	Las Vegas Motor Speedway, Las Vegas, Nevada	March 6	3:00 PM
4	Jeff Byrd 500 presented by Food City	Bristol Motor Speedway, Bristol	March 20	1:00 PM
5	Auto Club 400	Auto Club Speedway, Fontana	March 27	3:00 PM
6	Goody's Fast Relief 500	Martinsville Speedway, Ridgeway	April 3	1:00 PM
7	Samsung Mobile 500	Texas Motor Speedway, Fort Worth	April 9	7:30 PM
8	Aaron's 499	Talladega Superspeedway, Talladega	April 17	1:00 PM
9	Crown Royal presents the Matthew and Daniel Hansen 400	Richmond International Raceway, Richmond	April 30	7:30 PM
10	Showtime Southern 500	Darlington Raceway, Darlington	May 7	7:30 PM
11	FedEx 400 benefiting Autism Speaks	Dover International Speedway, Dover	May 15	1:00 PM
	Sprint Showdown	Charlotte Motor Speedway, Concord	May 21	7:00 PM
	Sprint All-Star Race XXVII	Charlotte Motor Speedway, Concord	May 21	9:00 PM
12	Coca-Cola 600	Charlotte Motor Speedway, Concord	May 29	6:00 PM
13	STP 400	Kansas Speedway, Kansas City	June 5	1:00 PM
14	5-hour Energy 500	Pocono Raceway, Long Pond	June 12	1:00 PM
15	Heluva Good! Sour Cream Dips 400	Michigan International Speedway, Brooklyn	June 19	1:00 PM
16	Toyota/Save Mart 350	Infineon Raceway, Sonoma	June 26	3:00 PM
17	Coke Zero 400 powered by Coca-Cola	Daytona International Speedway, Daytona Beach	July 2	7:30 PM
18	Quaker State 400	Kentucky Speedway, Sparta	July 9	7:30 PM
19	Lenox Industrial Tools 301	New Hampshire Motor Speedway, Loudon	July 17	1:00 PM
20	Brickyard 400 presented by Big Machine Records.com	Indianapolis Motor Speedway, Speedway	July 31	1:00 PM
21	Good Sam RV Insurance 500	Pocono Raceway, Long Pond	August 7	1:00 PM
22	Heluva Good! Sour Cream Dips at The Glen	Watkins Glen International, Watkins Glen	August 15*	10:00 AM
23	Pure Michigan 400	Michigan International Speedway, Brooklyn	August 21	1:00 PM
24	Irwin Tools Night Race	Bristol Motor Speedway, Bristol	August 27	7:30 PM
25	AdvoCare 500	Atlanta Motor Speedway, Hampton	September 6*	11:00 AM
26	Wonderful Pistachios 400	Richmond International Raceway, Richmond	September 10	7:30 PM
Chase for the Sprint Cup
27	GEICO 400	Chicagoland Speedway, Joliet	September 19*	12:00 PM
28	Sylvania 300	New Hampshire Motor Speedway, Loudon	September 25	2:00 PM
29	AAA 400	Dover International Speedway, Dover	October 2	2:00 PM
30	Hollywood Casino 400	Kansas Speedway, Kansas City	October 9	2:00 PM
31	Bank of America 500	Charlotte Motor Speedway, Concord	October 15	7:30 PM
32	Good Sam Club 500	Talladega Superspeedway, Talladega	October 23	2:00 PM
33	Tums Fast Relief 500	Martinsville Speedway, Ridgeway	October 30	1:30 PM
34	AAA Texas 500	Texas Motor Speedway, Fort Worth	November 6	3:00 PM
35	Kobalt Tools 500	Phoenix International Raceway, Phoenix	November 13	3:00 PM
36	Ford 400	Homestead-Miami Speedway, Homestead	November 20	3:00 PM

^1 Race was postponed due to rain.

=== Calendar changes ===
For the 2011 season, NASCAR made several changes to the schedule. One change was that the Subway Fresh Fit 600, held at Phoenix International Raceway, was reduced to 500 kilometers, making the name Subway Fresh Fit 500, and it became the second race of the season. Also, the Kobalt Tools 500, held at Atlanta Motor Speedway, was discontinued. The Auto Club 500 at Auto Club Speedway, was reduced to 400 miles making the name Auto Club 400, and became the fifth race of the season. More changes to the schedule included Kansas Speedway gaining a race (the STP 400), which was run on June 5, 2011, and Kentucky Speedway hosted its first Sprint Cup Series race, the Quaker State 400 on July 9, 2011. The Chase schedule was changed to the GEICO 400 becoming the first race in the Chase for the Sprint Cup; the Sylvania 300 at New Hampshire Motor Speedway was the second, while Auto Club Speedway's Pepsi Max 400 was removed completely from the schedule.

==== Starting times ====
Another change for the season involves the races in the Chase for the Sprint Cup, which had different starting times so they would not conflict with the beginning of NFL games. The change was made after seven races during the 2010 season began at 1:00 pm EST, the same time as the NFL games began. The change delayed the start of the first six races, excluding Charlotte, to 2:00 pm EDT, while the last three started at 3:00 pm EST. Charlotte Motor Speedway's race remained on Saturday night. Martinsville Speedway's October race on Halloween weekend featured a 1:30 pm EDT start because the track did not carry lights, and as a result is using the 2004–09 start time of 1:30 pm EDT. As of 2020, Martinsville Speedway now has lights.

== Preseason ==
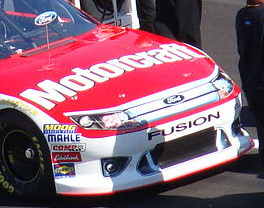
The new front end (shown here on Trevor Bayne's car prior to the 2011 Daytona 500 at Daytona International Speedway) that was being used during the season.

The preseason testing season began on January 20, 2011, with a three-day test at the Daytona International Speedway to test the new nose on the car, as well as the new surface. Also in the sessions, the opening of the restrictor plate was reduced from the 30/32 inch plate used in tire testing in December to 29/32 inch. NASCAR vice president for competition Robin Pemberton stated, "We'll have to get back and talk to the teams and look at the speeds from the last two days of testing. I think we have some high-water marks at 197-and-a-half which, depending on where they pulled up in the draft, it may be a little quick, but it's hard to say." During the first session on the morning of January 20, 2011, 33 drivers participated, and Clint Bowyer was quickest with a speed of 184.216 mph while David Reutimann had the highest speed of 195.780 mph during the second session in the afternoon.

The third test session, scheduled for the morning of January 21, was canceled because of wet weather. During the fourth session, held during the afternoon, 34 drivers participated with Denny Hamlin being quickest with a speed of 196.868 mph. Several drivers decided to leave after the session, which included Reutimann, Martin Truex Jr., Jimmie Johnson, and Bowyer. During the fifth session, held on the morning of January 22, 29 drivers participated, and Joey Logano was quickest with a speed of 197.516 mph. Brad Keselowski was quickest with a speed of 198.605 mph in the final session. Once the testing concluded, NASCAR managing director of competition John Darby commented that he did not expect to change the restrictor plate that they used in the January test sessions, leaving the opening at 29/32 inches.

== Report ==
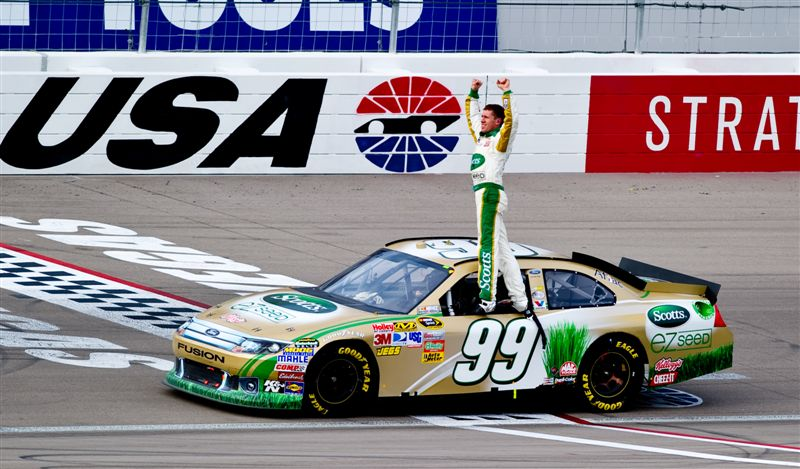
Carl Edwards, before performing his signature backflip after winning the Kobalt Tools 400, his only victory of the season

In the first exhibition race of the season, the 2011 Budweiser Shootout, Hamlin crossed the finished line in the first position, but since he passed below the yellow out of bounds line, Kurt Busch became the winner of the race. Trevor Bayne won the opening race of the season in the Daytona 500 after David Ragan received a penalty for a restart violation, with Bayne becoming just the fifth driver to win the race for Wood Brothers Racing and the youngest ever to win the Daytona 500 at 20 years and 1 day, as well as the first driver to win the race (excluding the inaugural 1959 race) in his first Daytona 500 start. Four-time champion, Jeff Gordon claimed victory in the 2011 Subway Fresh Fit 500 at Phoenix International Raceway, after leading the most laps of 138, ending a 66-race winless streak.

Next, Carl Edwards won the 2011 Kobalt Tools 400 after Tony Stewart, who led the most laps, was penalized on pit road. After winning the Nationwide race on Saturday, Kyle Busch held off Carl Edwards and Jimmie Johnson to take his fifth consecutive Bristol victory. Though Kyle dominated the race, Jimmie Johnson took the lead briefly but was passed on the last lap by Kevin Harvick, who took his first win of 2011 at Auto Club Speedway. The following week, Harvick passed fan favorite Dale Earnhardt Jr. with four laps to go to win at Martinsville Speedway. Roush Fenway Racing dominated the weekend at Texas Motor Speedway, with Matt Kenseth leading 169 laps en route to his first victory in 76 races.

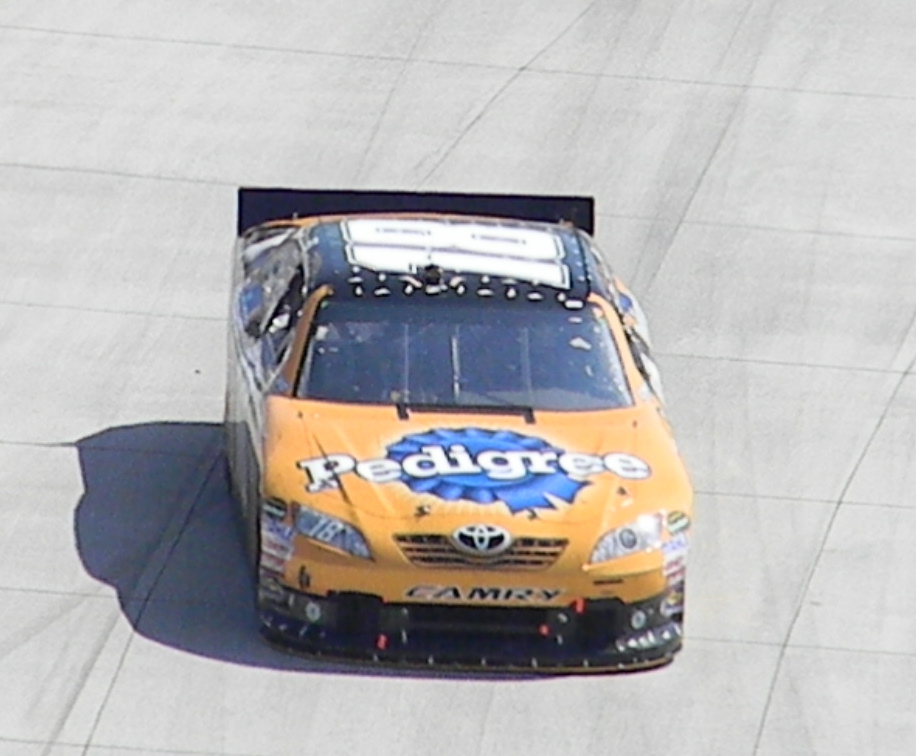
Kyle Busch (car shown above) is tied with Kevin Harvick for the second most wins during the season with four

In the Aaron's 499 Jimmie Johnson edged Clint Bowyer for the win at Talladega Superspeedway by .002 seconds, tying the closest finish in series history. For the third consecutive season, Kyle Busch dominated the spring race at Richmond, leading 293 of 400 laps en route to his second win of the season After being denied victory at Talladega in 2008, Regan Smith stayed out on older tires and held of points leader Carl Edwards for his and Furniture Row Racing's first Cup Series victory at Darlington Raceway. Making a last minute two-tire pit stop on the final pit stop, Matt Kenseth outran former teammate Mark Martin to take his second win of the season at Dover.

At the second exhibition race of the season, the NASCAR Sprint All-Star Race XXVII at Charlotte Motor Speedway, David Ragan and Brad Keselowski finished 1–2 in the Sprint Showdown, while fan favorite Dale Earnhardt Jr. won the fan vote to transfer into the main event. Carl Edwards dominated the final two segments and held off Kyle Busch for his first All-Star victory. With the teams remaining in Charlotte for the Coca-Cola 600, Dale Earnhardt Jr. came close to snapping his winless drought by gambling on fuel, but ran out of gas on the backstretch, allowing Kevin Harvick to drive to his 3rd win of 2011. At 402 laps and 603 miles, the race was the longest in NASCAR history. At the inaugural STP 400 at Kansas Speedway, a dominant Kurt Busch was forced to stop for fuel with 7 laps to go, allowing teammate Brad Keselowski to take the lead and hold off a charging Dale Earnhardt Jr. for his second Sprint Cup victory. At the 5-hour Energy 500, a quick final pit stop enabled Jeff Gordon to beat polesitter Kurt Busch out of the pits, getting Gordon his 84th Sprint Cup victory, tying Bobby Allison and Darrell Waltrip for third on the all-time wins list and also tying Waltrip for the most wins in NASCAR's modern era. The next week at Michigan, defending race winner Denny Hamlin got an excellent final pit stop, enabling him to hold off Matt Kenseth for his first win of the season. The next week at Infineon Raceway, Kurt Busch dominated the race and easily held off Jeff Gordon for his first win of 2011 and first on a road course.

The series returned to Daytona for the Independence Day weekend. Daytona 500 winner Trevor Bayne crashed out early, and David Ragan with help from teammate Matt Kenseth, rebounded from his late 500 loss to take his first Sprint Cup victory. The following week, at the inaugural Quaker State 400 at Kentucky Speedway, Kyle Busch dominated the race and held off a hard charging David Reutimann for his third win of the season. Heading up to New England for the Lenox Industrial Tools 301 at Loudon, Ryan Newman and Tony Stewart, both drivers for Stewart–Haas Racing started first and second on the grid, and the two remained in the same order at the conclusion of the race, Newman's his first win of season. After an off week, the series made its way to the prestigious Indianapolis Motor Speedway for the Brickyard 400. Though Jeff Gordon had the dominant car, pit strategy got Paul Menard out front and eventually hold off a hard-charging Gordon for his first career Sprint Cup victory.

The series returned to Pocono for the Good Sam RV Insurance 500. The Joe Gibbs Racing trio of Denny Hamlin, Kyle Busch, and Joey Logano dominated the race, but Brad Keselowski, racing injured from a crash at Road Atlanta, held off Busch with 10 to go to take his second win of the year. The next week at Watkins Glen, Cup drivers returned to road course racing, and Marcos Ambrose held off Brad Keselowski and Kyle Busch in a green-white-checker finish and avoided several violent crashes, including David Reutimann flipping in the esses on the final lap, to claim his first Sprint Cup Series win, becoming the fifth first-time winner in 2011. Ambrose also became the first Australian ever (and fourth foreign-born driver) to win a Cup Series race. The series returned to Michigan for the Pure Michigan 400, and Kyle Busch would dominate the race and hold off Jimmie Johnson for his fourth win of 2011. Heading to Bristol for the Irwin Tools Night Race, Jeff Gordon and Matt Kenseth dominated the race, but Brad Keselowski got out front after a fast final pitstop and held off Martin Truex Jr. for his third win of 2011.

Heading to Atlanta Motor Speedway for the Labor Day weekend, the race was pushed to Tuesday September 6 due to Tropical Storm Lee dumping rain on the Southwest Sunday and Monday. When the race resumed, Jeff Gordon held off Hendrick Motorsports teammate Jimmie Johnson for his 3rd win of 2011 and his 85th overall win in the Cup Series. At the Wonderful Pistachios 400, the last race of the regular season was hotly contested with multiple drivers needing a win to break into the Chase. Kevin Harvick would end up holding off the field for his 4th win of 2011 while Denny Hamlin and Brad Keselowski completed the two wild card spots in the top 12. For the first time, Chicagoland Speedway was the site of the Chase opener. With the race delayed until Monday due to rain, Tony Stewart held off a hard-charging Kevin Harvick and outlasted the field on fuel to take his first win of 2011. The teams headed up north to return to New Hampshire Motor Speedway for the Sylvania 300. Once again, the race came down to fuel mileage as Tony Stewart passed Clint Bowyer with 2 laps to go and held on for his second consecutive win of the year. In the series' return to Dover, Jimmie Johnson dominated the race, but Kurt Busch took advantage of a restart and held off Johnson for his second win of 2011. Heading to Kansas, Jimmie Johnson once again dominated the race, but sealed up his second win of the season on a Green-white-checkered finish by holding off Kasey Kahne.

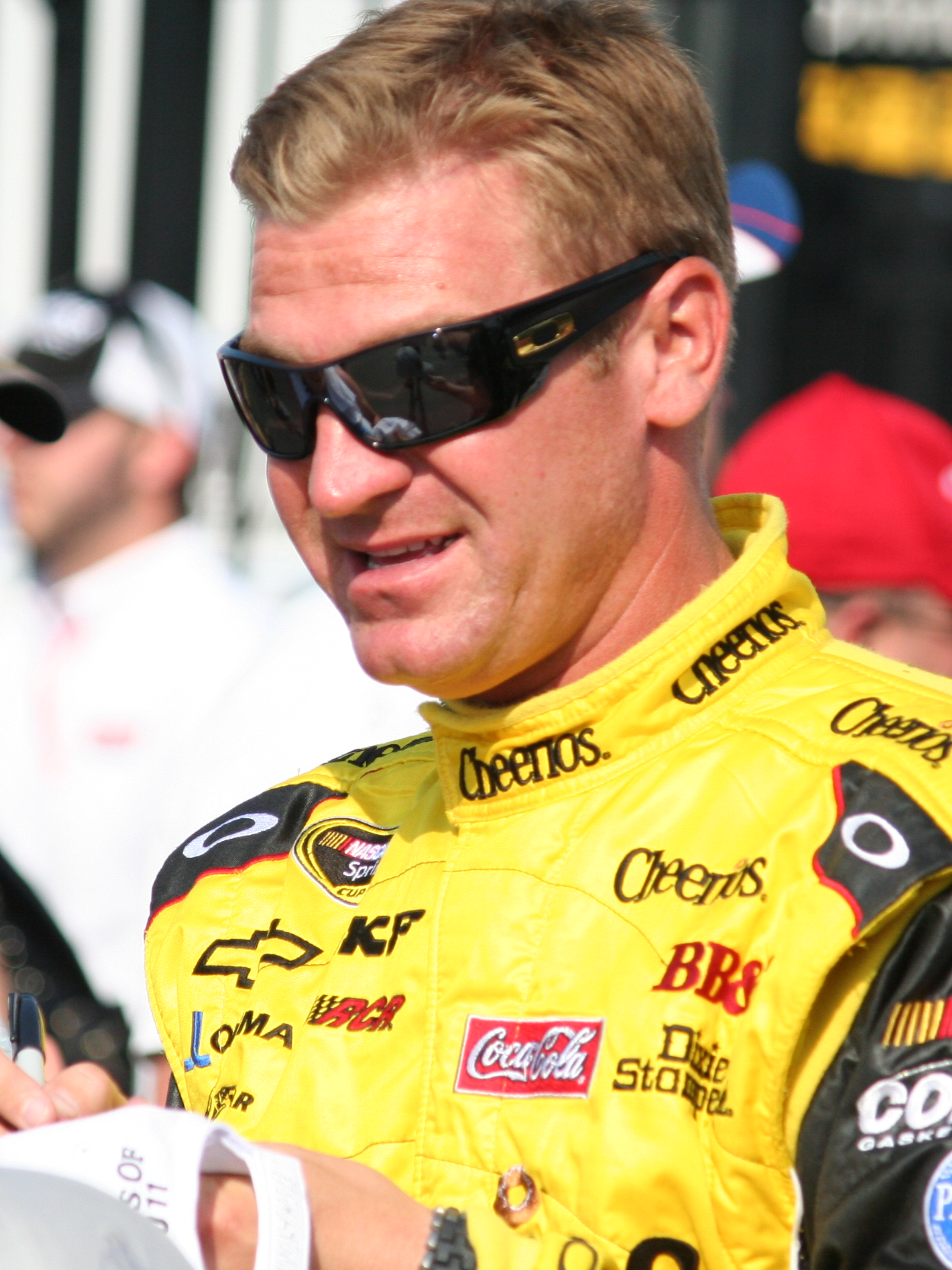
Clint Bowyer, shown here before the Coca-Cola 600, claimed his only victory of the season in the Good Sam Club 500 at Talladega.

The series returned to Charlotte for the halfway mark of the Chase. Kyle Busch dominated the race, but Matt Kenseth passed Busch late in the race and held him off for his third win of 2011. During the Good Sam Club 500 at Talladega, the controversial two-car draft dominated the race, as the RCR duo of Jeff Burton and Clint Bowyer pulled away from the field on a late restart, though Bowyer would pass Burton on the final lap and beat him to the line by a fender for his second consecutive fall Talladega win. The teams returned to Martinsville for the final short track of the season. There, the Chase drivers had up and down days, but Tony Stewart passed Jimmie Johnson on the final restart to grab his third win of 2011 and keep his Chase hopes alive. Returning to Texas, Stewart dominated and passed a gambling Jeff Burton with 5 to go to hold off points leader Carl Edwards for his fourth win in 2011.

At the penultimate race in Phoenix, the drivers face a completely new Phoenix International Raceway. Stewart dominated once again, but Kasey Kahne held off a hard-charging Carl Edwards to snap an 81 race winless streak. At the season finale, championship contenders Edwards and Stewart dominated the race with a razor-thin points gap, but Stewart prevailed and took home both his fifth win of 2011 and defeated Edwards for his first Cup championship as an owner-driver (Stewart and Edwards were tied in points after the race; Stewart prevailed on the first tie-breaker, number of race wins during the season – Stewart had five wins during the season (all during the Chase) while Edwards had only one win in the third race of the season). 2011 saw 5 drivers win their 1st ever Sprint Cup race (Trevor Bayne, Regan Smith, David Ragan, Paul Menard, and Marcos Ambrose). 2011 also saw 19 different drivers winning at least one race. 2011 matched 2001 with both modern era record accomplishments.

== Results and standings ==
=== Races ===
No.	Race	Pole position	Most laps led	Winning driver	Winning manufacturer	Report
	Budweiser Shootout	Dale Earnhardt Jr.	Jeff Burton	Kurt Busch	Dodge	Report
	Gatorade Duel 1	Dale Earnhardt Jr.	Kevin Harvick	Kurt Busch	Dodge	Report
	Gatorade Duel 2	Jeff Gordon	Jeff Burton	Jeff Burton	Chevrolet	Report
1	Daytona 500	Dale Earnhardt Jr.	Ryan Newman	Trevor Bayne	Ford	Report
2	Subway Fresh Fit 500	Carl Edwards	Jeff Gordon	Jeff Gordon	Chevrolet	Report
3	Kobalt Tools 400	Matt Kenseth	Tony Stewart	Carl Edwards	Ford	Report
4	Jeff Byrd 500	Carl Edwards	Jimmie Johnson	Kyle Busch	Toyota	Report
5	Auto Club 400	Juan Pablo Montoya	Kyle Busch	Kevin Harvick	Chevrolet	Report
6	Goody's Fast Relief 500	Jamie McMurray	Kyle Busch	Kevin Harvick	Chevrolet	Report
7	Samsung Mobile 500	David Ragan	Matt Kenseth	Matt Kenseth	Ford	Report
8	Aaron's 499	Jeff Gordon	Clint Bowyer	Jimmie Johnson	Chevrolet	Report
9	Crown Royal presents the Matthew and Daniel Hansen 400	Juan Pablo Montoya	Kyle Busch	Kyle Busch	Toyota	Report
10	Showtime Southern 500	Kasey Kahne	Kasey Kahne	Regan Smith	Chevrolet	Report
11	FedEx 400 benefiting Autism Speaks	Jimmie Johnson	Jimmie Johnson	Matt Kenseth	Ford	Report
	NASCAR Sprint All-Star Race	Kyle Busch	Greg Biffle	Carl Edwards	Ford	Report
12	Coca-Cola 600	Brad Keselowski	Matt Kenseth	Kevin Harvick	Chevrolet	Report
13	STP 400	Kurt Busch	Kurt Busch	Brad Keselowski	Dodge	Report
14	5-hour Energy 500	Kurt Busch	Denny Hamlin	Jeff Gordon	Chevrolet	Report
15	Heluva Good! Sour Cream Dips 400	Kurt Busch	Greg Biffle	Denny Hamlin	Toyota	Report
16	Toyota/Save Mart 350	Joey Logano	Kurt Busch	Kurt Busch	Dodge	Report
17	Coke Zero 400	Mark Martin	Ryan Newman	David Ragan	Ford	Report
18	Quaker State 400	Kyle Busch	Kyle Busch	Kyle Busch	Toyota	Report
19	Lenox Industrial Tools 301	Ryan Newman	Ryan Newman	Ryan Newman	Chevrolet	Report
20	Brickyard 400 presented by BigMachineRecords.com	David Ragan	Kasey Kahne	Paul Menard	Chevrolet	Report
21	Good Sam RV Insurance 500	Joey Logano	Denny Hamlin	Brad Keselowski	Dodge	Report
22	Heluva Good! Sour Cream Dips at The Glen	Kyle Busch	Kyle Busch	Marcos Ambrose	Ford	Report
23	Pure Michigan 400	Greg Biffle	Greg Biffle	Kyle Busch	Toyota	Report
24	Irwin Tools Night Race	Ryan Newman	Jeff Gordon	Brad Keselowski	Dodge	Report
25	AdvoCare 500	Kasey Kahne	Jeff Gordon	Jeff Gordon	Chevrolet	Report
26	Wonderful Pistachios 400	David Reutimann	Kevin Harvick	Kevin Harvick	Chevrolet	Report
Chase for the Sprint Cup
27	GEICO 400	Matt Kenseth	Kurt Busch	Tony Stewart	Chevrolet	Report
28	Sylvania 300	Ryan Newman	Jeff Gordon	Tony Stewart	Chevrolet	Report
29	AAA 400	Martin Truex Jr.	Jimmie Johnson	Kurt Busch	Dodge	Report
30	Hollywood Casino 400	Greg Biffle	Jimmie Johnson	Jimmie Johnson	Chevrolet	Report
31	Bank of America 500	Tony Stewart	Kyle Busch	Matt Kenseth	Ford	Report
32	Good Sam Club 500	Mark Martin	Tony Stewart	Clint Bowyer	Chevrolet	Report
33	Tums Fast Relief 500	Carl Edwards	Kyle Busch	Tony Stewart	Chevrolet	Report
34	AAA Texas 500	Greg Biffle	Tony Stewart	Tony Stewart	Chevrolet	Report
35	Kobalt Tools 500	Matt Kenseth	Tony Stewart	Kasey Kahne	Toyota	Report
36	Ford 400	Carl Edwards	Carl Edwards	Tony Stewart	Chevrolet	Report

=== Drivers ===
(key) Bold – Pole position awarded by time. Italics – Pole position set by final practice results. * – Most laps led.

Pos	Driver	DAY	PHO	LVS	BRI	CAL	MAR	TEX	TAL	RCH	DAR	DOV	CLT	KAN	POC	MCH	SON	DAY	KEN	NHA	IND	POC	GLN	MCH	BRI	ATL	RCH	CHI	NHA	DOV	KAN	CLT	TAL	MAR	TEX	PHO	HOM	Points
1	Tony Stewart	13	7	2*	19	13	34	12	17	9	7	29	17	8	21	7	39	11	12	2	6	11	27	9	28	3	7	1	1	25	15	**8**	7*	1	1*	3*	1	2403
2	Carl Edwards	2	**28**	1	**2**	6	18	3	6	5	2	7	16	5	37	5	3	37	5	13	14	7	12	36	9	5	2	4	8	3	5	3	11	9	2	2	**2***	2403
3	Kevin Harvick	42	4	17	6	1	1	20	5	12	17	10	1	11	5	14	9	7	16	21	11	14	6	22	22	7	1*	2	12	10	6	6	32	4	13	19	8	2345
4	Matt Kenseth	34	12	**11**	4	4	6	1*	36	21	25	1	14*	6	8	2	14	2	6	20	5	16	17	10	6	9	23	**21**	6	5	4	1	18	31	4	**34**	4	2330
5	Brad Keselowski	29	15	26	18	26	19	18	33	36	3	13	**19**	1	23	25	10	15	7	35	9	1	2	3	1	6	12	5	2	20	3	16	4	17	24	18	20	2319
6	Jimmie Johnson	27	3	16	3*	2	11	8	1	8	15	9*	28	7	4	27	7	20	3	5	19	4	10	2	4	2	31	10	18	2*	1*	34	26	2	14	14	32	2304
7	Dale Earnhardt Jr.	**24**	10	8	11	12	2	9	4	19	14	12	7	2	6	21	41	19	30	15	16	9	14	14	16	19	16	3	17	24	14	19	25	7	7	24	11	2290
8	Jeff Gordon	28	1*	36	14	18	5	23	**3**	39	12	17	20	4	1	17	2	6	11	11	2	6	13	6	3*	1*	3	24	4*	12	34	21	27	3	6	32	5	2287
9	Denny Hamlin	21	11	7	33	39	12	15	23	2	6	16	10	3	19*	1	37	13	10	3	27	15*	36	35	7	8	9	31	29	18	16	9	8	5	20	12	9	2284
10	Ryan Newman	22*	5	5	10	5	20	14	25	20	5	21	31	15	9	6	25	23	4	**1***	12	5	16	5	**8**	20	8	8	**25**	23	18	10	38	10	16	5	12	2284
11	Kurt Busch	5	8	9	7	17	16	10	18	22	27	14	4	**9***	**2**	**11**	1*	14	9	10	21	3	38	34	17	4	5	6*	22	1	13	13	36	14	30	22	34	2262
12	Kyle Busch	8	2	38	1	3*	3*	16	35	1*	11	4	32	12	3	3	11	5	1*	36	10	2	**3***	1	14	23	6	22	11	6	11	2*	33	27*	EX	36	23	2246
Chase for the Sprint Cup cut-off
Pos	Driver	DAY	PHO	LVS	BRI	CAL	MAR	TEX	TAL	RCH	DAR	DOV	CLT	KAN	POC	MCH	SON	DAY	KEN	NHA	IND	POC	GLN	MCH	BRI	ATL	RCH	CHI	NHA	DOV	KAN	CLT	TAL	MAR	TEX	PHO	HOM	Points
13	Clint Bowyer	17	27	15	35	7	9	2	2*	6	31	6	15	18	16	8	4	36	35	17	13	18	11	8	26	36	22	7	26	8	7	24	1	19	9	10	6	1047
14	Kasey Kahne	25	6	14	9	9	39	21	37	3	**4***	36	22	14	12	28	20	4	13	6	18*	28	26	7	11	**34**	38	12	15	4	2	4	6	25	3	1	7	1041
15	A. J. Allmendinger	11	9	19	31	14	14	19	11	7	20	37	5	27	25	13	13	10	28	12	22	19	8	11	12	10	11	27	21	7	25	7	31	11	10	6	15	1013
16	Greg Biffle	35	20	28	8	11	21	4	7	15	8	19	13	10	27	15*	23	18	21	18	7	8	31	**20***	31	12	13	26	3	27	**8**	15	14	15	**5**	13	35	997
17	Paul Menard	9	17	12	5	16	38	5	12	37	22	24	29	19	14	4	17	8	24	24	1	10	32	26	30	18	34	20	20	16	12	17	12	24	15	9	16	947
18	Martin Truex Jr.	19	14	6	17	21	40	35	13	27	10	8	26	20	10	26	8	35	18	8	24	12	4	19	2	14	30	18	16	**30**	36	23	10	8	8	20	3	937
19	Marcos Ambrose	37	16	4	15	28	29	6	32	23	13	3	6	26	34	23	5	17	20	9	34	20	1	27	10	21	21	19	30	9	9	5	19	29	11	8	39	936
20	Jeff Burton	36	26	21	20	15	24	11	16	16	33	11	21	25	20	24	21	21	19	16	35	17	9	17	15	13	29	15	13	11	21	18	2	6	27	4	10	935
21	Juan Pablo Montoya	6	19	3	24	**10**	4	13	30	**29**	23	32	12	17	7	30	22	9	15	30	28	32	7	25	19	15	15	14	9	22	23	14	23	22	18	15	31	932
22	Mark Martin	10	13	18	12	20	10	36	8	14	19	2	34	21	18	9	19	**33**	22	22	8	13	25	4	38	17	10	9	24	19	10	37	**20**	28	19	16	24	930
23	David Ragan	14	36	22	16	22	8	**7**	39	4	21	28	2	13	17	20	29	1	8	14	**23**	34	28	12	20	35	4	11	7	21	20	11	28	33	12	33	38	906
24	Joey Logano	23	33	23	23	25	13	24	10	11	35	27	3	23	11	18	6	3	14	4	25	**26**	5	21	13	24	35	16	14	29	29	12	24	18	37	11	19	902
25	Brian Vickers	31	30	10	36	8	17	27	38	10	34	5	18	16	22	10	36	12	27	34	15	39	15	15	21	11	33	13	5	14	19	20	5	30	21	23	17	846
26	Regan Smith	7	34	39	22	27	31	37	15	17	1	34	8	24	15	33	16	24	17	33	3	21	23	13	18	33	18	17	10	17	24	25	30	13	23	38	13	820
27	Jamie McMurray	18	35	27	21	23	**7**	22	21	18	9	20	37	29	33	19	15	22	36	31	4	22	18	23	5	16	14	38	23	15	22	27	29	35	36	17	14	795
28	David Reutimann	30	29	13	30	19	15	29	14	31	16	15	9	22	13	35	24	25	2	19	36	24	29	18	36	31	**26**	32	28	13	35	26	13	20	22	7	18	757
29	Bobby Labonte	4	21	24	13	38	27	25	24	24	18	18	24	28	28	22	38	31	26	7	17	25	19	16	34	38	20	37	19	26	30	29	35	32	28	21	27	670
30	David Gilliland	3	22	37	27	31	33	42	9	25	32	22	33	33	29	29	12	16	31	25	33	23	33	32	24	37	27	36	32	28	32	36	22	34	32	31	33	572
31	Casey Mears	DNQ	18	25	37	29	36	26	22	28	30	23	23	37	30	38	34	32	25	38	29	36	22	37	23	28	17	29	42	35	42	32	17	12	25	26	26	541
32	Dave Blaney	26	42	34	25	37	30	30	27	13	24	26	27	32	26	34	31	39	33	29	31	30	DNQ	33	35	43	19	33	35	32	31	35	3	23	35	27	28	508
33	Andy Lally **(R)**	33	31	32	32	32		32	19	26	DNQ	33	DNQ	31	32	36	35	27	32	28	26	29	24	29	25	30	32	28	34	33	37	42^{1}	39		29	DNQ		398
34	Robby Gordon	16	32	31	39	34	23	31	20	35	37		38			37	18	34	DNQ		43	35	21		43	39	37	39	40			38	37			35		268
35	J. J. Yeley	43	37	40	40	41	41	41		43	39	40	42	38	42	39		DNQ	40	23	DNQ	43	42	43	DNQ	25	42	34	27	34	43	22	42	40	43	28	41	192
36	Michael McDowell	DNQ	41	41	43	43	32	40	DNQ	40	43	43	39	41	41	43	30	42	41	40	37		41		39	41	39	43	37	40	39	39	40	39	33	40	43	139
37	Tony Raines		25	35	28	36	25	34	DNQ	33	36	35	DNQ	DNQ	36	DNQ		DNQ	38	DNQ				38		DNQ												129
38	Ken Schrader				DNQ	33	22	33		32	28													30										21				110
39	Terry Labonte	15							34								32	28			41		34		33								34					102
40	Bill Elliott	12	23	30	29				26																													100
41	David Stremme									34	41	42	40	39		41			DNQ	37^{1}	DNQ	38		40	32	DNQ	40	41	38	41	40	41		38	DNQ	DNQ	42	80
42	Michael Waltrip	40							28										DNQ														9					56
43	Boris Said																28						20															38
44	Geoff Bodine																	38				DNQ				DNQ						DNQ	DNQ		38	37	30	33
45	T. J. Bell **(R)**										38^{1}		DNQ	DNQ	39				DNQ		42	DNQ	37	DNQ	DNQ	DNQ	DNQ		DNQ				DNQ				29	29
46	Stephen Leicht																										24	DNQ										20
47	Andy Pilgrim																26																					18
48	Chris Cook																27																					17
49	Brian Simo																33						DNQ															11
50	Brian Keselowski **(R)**	41	DNQ	DNQ						DNQ	DNQ					DNQ																						3
51	Erik Darnell																			39^{1}	DNQ	42		DNQ			DNQ											2
52	Steve Park								42																				DNQ									2
Ineligible for Sprint Cup driver points, but eligible for owner points if pre-entered
Pos	Driver	DAY	PHO	LVS	BRI	CAL	MAR	TEX	TAL	RCH	DAR	DOV	CLT	KAN	POC	MCH	SON	DAY	KEN	NHA	IND	POC	GLN	MCH	BRI	ATL	RCH	CHI	NHA	DOV	KAN	CLT	TAL	MAR	TEX	PHO	HOM	Points
53	Trevor Bayne	1	40	20	34	30	35	17	40	INJ	INJ	INJ	INJ	INJ		16		41			30			24				23				31	15		17		25	–
54	Ricky Stenhouse Jr.												11																									–
55	Landon Cassill		38	43	42	24	26	28	31	38	29	30	35	35	24	12		26	23	26	20	27		31		22	25	30	33	31	17	28	16	42	26	29	36	–
56	Travis Kvapil	32	39	33	26	35	37	DNQ	29	30	26	31	25	34		31		29	29		DNQ	31		28	37	42	28	DNQ	43	43	27	40	21	16	31	43	22	–
57	Steve Wallace	20																																				–
58	Mike Bliss											25	30		31	32			34	32	32				29	26	36	25	31	36	28	30			34	30	21	–
59	Mike Skinner		24	29			42	43	DNQ	41	40	41	43	40	DNQ	DNQ	42	40	43	42	40	DNQ	43	42	41	27	DNQ	DNQ	Wth	DNQ	DNQ	Wth		43	41	42	DNQ	–
60	Cole Whitt																																			25	37	–
61	Hermie Sadler						28																									33		26				–
62	Austin Dillon																														26							–
63	David Starr							38					36						DNQ						27	29		DNQ			DNQ				DNQ			–
64	Scott Wimmer											38	DNQ		38				37	27	DNQ																	–
65	Joe Nemechek	39	43	42	41	42	43	39	41	42	42	39	41	43	40	40	40	30	39	41	38	41	40	41	40	40	41	40	36	39	41	43	41	41	42	41	40	–
66	Patrick Carpentier													30																								–
67	Ron Fellows																						30															–
68	Scott Speed																				39	40	39		42	32	43	35	41	42	33	DNQ	DNQ	37	39	39	DNQ	–
69	Jason White																					33																–
70	Sam Hornish Jr.														35																							–
71	Andrew Ranger																						35															–
72	Reed Sorenson																													38	38			36	DNQ		DNQ	–
73	Johnny Sauter													36										DNQ														–
74	Josh Wise																											42	39	37	DNQ	DNQ	DNQ		40			–
75	Todd Bodine	DNQ				40																37		39														–
76	Dennis Setzer				38		Wth													DNQ														DNQ			DNQ	–
77	Robert Richardson Jr.	38																																				–
78	Scott Riggs										DNQ	DNQ	DNQ	42	43	42			42	DNQ																DNQ	DNQ	–
79	Kevin Conway	DNQ							43									43															43					–
80	P. J. Jones																43						DNQ															–
81	Jeff Green																			43					DNQ													–
82	Derrike Cope	DNQ									Wth																							DNQ				–
83	Tony Ave																DNQ																					–
84	Grant Enfinger																																				DNQ	–
85	Norm Benning	Wth																																				–
86	David Mayhew																QL																					–
Pos	Driver	DAY	PHO	LVS	BRI	CAL	MAR	TEX	TAL	RCH	DAR	DOV	CLT	KAN	POC	MCH	SON	DAY	KEN	NHA	IND	POC	GLN	MCH	BRI	ATL	RCH	CHI	NHA	DOV	KAN	CLT	TAL	MAR	TEX	PHO	HOM	Points
	References																																					
*^{1} – Post entry, driver and owner did not score points.

Note:This list does not include exhibition races.

- Kyle Busch was suspended from competing in the second Texas race due to crashing out championship contender Ron Hornaday Jr. during a caution at the 2011 WinStar World Casino 350K earlier that weekend. He was replaced by Michael McDowell.

=== Manufacturer ===
Pos	Manufacturer	Wins	Points
1	Chevrolet	18	**248**
2	Ford	7	**195**
3	Toyota	6	**187**
4	Dodge	5	**162**

== See also ==
- 2011 NASCAR Nationwide Series
- 2011 NASCAR Camping World Truck Series
- 2011 ARCA Racing Series
- 2011 NASCAR Whelen Modified Tour
- 2011 NASCAR Whelen Southern Modified Tour
- 2011 NASCAR Canadian Tire Series
- 2011 NASCAR Corona Series
- 2011 NASCAR Stock V6 Series
