= 2011 Sylvania 300 =

Race details
- Race 28 of 36 in the 2011 NASCAR Sprint Cup Series
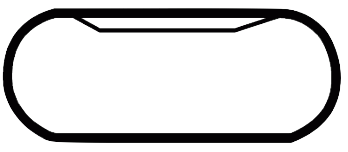
- Layout of New Hampshire Motor Speedway
- Date: September 25, 2011
- Location: New Hampshire Motor Speedway, Loudon, New Hampshire
- Course: Permanent racing facility
- Course length: 1.703 km (1.06 miles)
- Distance: 300 laps, 317.4 mi (510.8 km)
- Weather: Warm with temperatures approaching 82 °F (28 °C); wind speeds up to 6 miles per hour (9.7 km/h)
- Average speed: 116.679 miles per hour (187.777 km/h)

Pole position
Driver	Ryan Newman	Stewart Haas Racing
- Time: 28.213

Most laps led
Driver	Jeff Gordon	Hendrick Motorsports
- Laps: 79

Winner
No. 14	Tony Stewart	Stewart Haas Racing

Television in the United States
- Network: ESPN
- Announcers: Allen Bestwick, Dale Jarrett and Andy Petree

The 2011 Sylvania 300 was a NASCAR Cup Series stock car race that was held on September 25, 2011 at New Hampshire Motor Speedway in Loudon, New Hampshire. Contested 300 laps on the 1.058-mile (1.702 km) asphalt oval, it was the 28th race of the 2011 Sprint Cup Series season, as well as the second race in the ten-race Chase for the Sprint Cup, which ends the season. The race was won by Tony Stewart for the Stewart Haas Racing team. Brad Keselowski finished second, and Greg Biffle clinched third.

Previous race: 2011 GEICO 400	Sprint Cup Series; 2011 season	Next race: 2011 AAA 400
