= 2020 Pennzoil 400 =

NASCAR Cup Series race

Race details
- Race 2 of 36 in the 2020 NASCAR Cup Series
- The 2020 Pennzoil 400 program cover, featuring Joey Logano.
- Date: February 23, 2020
- Location: Las Vegas Motor Speedway in Las Vegas
- Course: Permanent racing facility
- Course length: 2.4 km (1.5 miles)
- Distance: 267 laps, 400.5 mi (640.8 km)
- Average speed: 134.861 miles per hour (217.038 km/h)

Pole position
Driver	Kyle Busch	Joe Gibbs Racing
- Time: N/A

Most laps led
Driver	Kevin Harvick	Stewart-Haas Racing
- Laps: 92

Winner
No. 22	Joey Logano	Team Penske

Television in the United States
- Network: Fox
- Announcers: Mike Joy and Jeff Gordon
- Nielsen ratings: 5.500 million

Radio in the United States
- Radio: PRN
- Booth announcers: Doug Rice and Mark Garrow
- Turn announcers: Rob Albright (1 & 2) and Pat Patterson (3 & 4)

The 2020 Pennzoil 400 presented by Jiffy Lube was a NASCAR Cup Series race held on February 23, 2020, at Las Vegas Motor Speedway in Las Vegas. Contested over 267 laps on the 1.5 mi (2.4 km) asphalt intermediate speedway, it was the second race of the 2020 NASCAR Cup Series season. It was the first NASCAR Cup Series race run without Ryan Newman and David Ragan in the field since Loudon, 2001 and Homestead, 2006 respectively. Joey Logano was the race winner.

== Report ==
=== Background ===
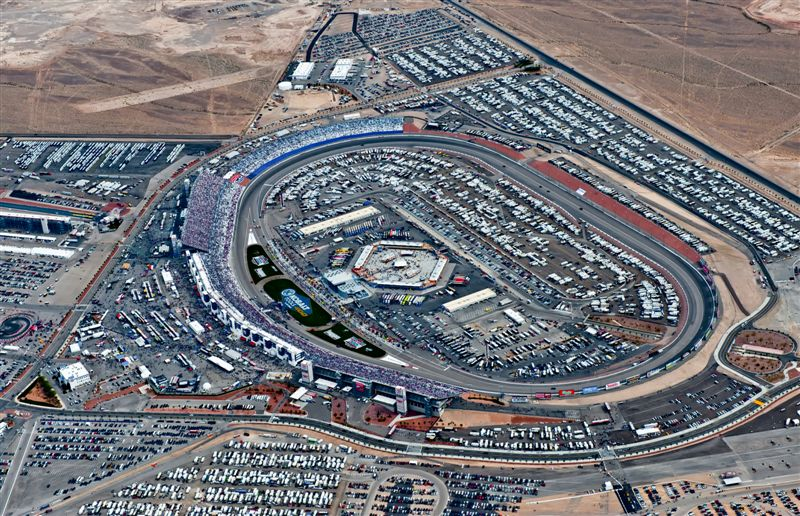
Las Vegas Motor Speedway, the track where the race was held.

Las Vegas Motor Speedway, located in Clark County, Nevada outside the Las Vegas city limits and about 15 miles northeast of the Las Vegas Strip, is a 1,200-acre (490 ha) complex of multiple tracks for motorsports racing. The complex is owned by Speedway Motorsports, Inc., which is headquartered in Charlotte, North Carolina.

==== Entry list ====
- (R) denotes rookie driver.
- (i) denotes driver who are ineligible for series driver points.

No.	Driver	Team	Manufacturer
00	Quin Houff (R)	StarCom Racing	Chevrolet
1	Kurt Busch	Chip Ganassi Racing	Chevrolet
2	Brad Keselowski	Team Penske	Ford
3	Austin Dillon	Richard Childress Racing	Chevrolet
4	Kevin Harvick	Stewart-Haas Racing	Ford
6	Ross Chastain (i)	Roush Fenway Racing	Ford
8	Tyler Reddick (R)	Richard Childress Racing	Chevrolet
9	Chase Elliott	Hendrick Motorsports	Chevrolet
10	Aric Almirola	Stewart-Haas Racing	Ford
11	Denny Hamlin	Joe Gibbs Racing	Toyota
12	Ryan Blaney	Team Penske	Ford
13	Ty Dillon	Germain Racing	Chevrolet
14	Clint Bowyer	Stewart-Haas Racing	Ford
15	Brennan Poole (R)	Premium Motorsports	Chevrolet
17	Chris Buescher	Roush Fenway Racing	Ford
18	Kyle Busch	Joe Gibbs Racing	Toyota
19	Martin Truex Jr.	Joe Gibbs Racing	Toyota
20	Erik Jones	Joe Gibbs Racing	Toyota
21	Matt DiBenedetto	Wood Brothers Racing	Ford
22	Joey Logano	Team Penske	Ford
24	William Byron	Hendrick Motorsports	Chevrolet
32	Corey LaJoie	Go Fas Racing	Ford
34	Michael McDowell	Front Row Motorsports	Ford
37	Ryan Preece	JTG Daugherty Racing	Chevrolet
38	John Hunter Nemechek (R)	Front Row Motorsports	Ford
41	Cole Custer (R)	Stewart-Haas Racing	Ford
42	Kyle Larson	Chip Ganassi Racing	Chevrolet
43	Bubba Wallace	Richard Petty Motorsports	Chevrolet
47	Ricky Stenhouse Jr.	JTG Daugherty Racing	Chevrolet
48	Jimmie Johnson	Hendrick Motorsports	Chevrolet
51	Garrett Smithley	Petty Ware Racing	Chevrolet
52	J. J. Yeley (i)	Rick Ware Racing	Ford
53	Joey Gase (i)	Rick Ware Racing	Ford
66	Timmy Hill (i)	MBM Motorsports	Toyota
77	Reed Sorenson	Spire Motorsports	Chevrolet
88	Alex Bowman	Hendrick Motorsports	Chevrolet
95	Christopher Bell (R)	Leavine Family Racing	Toyota
96	Daniel Suárez	Gaunt Brothers Racing	Toyota
Official entry list

== Practice ==
=== First practice ===
Aric Almirola was the fastest in the first practice session with a time of 30.226 seconds and a speed of 178.654 mph (287.516 km/h).

Pos	No.	Driver	Team	Manufacturer	Time	Speed
1	10	Aric Almirola	Stewart-Haas Racing	Ford	30.226	178.654
2	14	Clint Bowyer	Stewart-Haas Racing	Ford	30.272	178.383
3	13	Ty Dillon	Germain Racing	Chevrolet	30.325	178.071
Official first practice results

=== Final practice ===
Jimmie Johnson was the fastest in the final practice session with a time of 30.095 seconds and a speed of 179.432 mph (288.768 km/h).

Pos	No.	Driver	Team	Manufacturer	Time	Speed
1	48	Jimmie Johnson	Hendrick Motorsports	Chevrolet	30.095	179.432
2	14	Clint Bowyer	Stewart-Haas Racing	Ford	30.122	179.271
3	10	Aric Almirola	Stewart-Haas Racing	Ford	30.139	179.170
Official final practice results

== Qualifying ==
Qualifying for Saturday was cancelled due to rain and Kyle Busch was awarded the pole as a result.

=== Starting Lineup ===
Pos	No.	Driver	Team	Manufacturer
1	18	Kyle Busch	Joe Gibbs Racing	Toyota
2	19	Martin Truex Jr.	Joe Gibbs Racing	Toyota
3	4	Kevin Harvick	Stewart-Haas Racing	Ford
4	11	Denny Hamlin	Joe Gibbs Racing	Toyota
5	22	Joey Logano	Team Penske	Ford
6	42	Kyle Larson	Chip Ganassi Racing	Chevrolet
7	12	Ryan Blaney	Team Penske	Ford
8	2	Brad Keselowski	Team Penske	Ford
9	14	Clint Bowyer	Stewart-Haas Racing	Ford
10	9	Chase Elliott	Hendrick Motorsports	Chevrolet
11	24	William Byron	Hendrick Motorsports	Chevrolet
12	88	Alex Bowman	Hendrick Motorsports	Chevrolet
13	1	Kurt Busch	Chip Ganassi Racing	Chevrolet
14	10	Aric Almirola	Stewart-Haas Racing	Ford
15	6	Ross Chastain (i)	Roush Fenway Racing	Ford
16	20	Erik Jones	Joe Gibbs Racing	Toyota
17	41	Cole Custer (R)	Stewart-Haas Racing	Ford
18	48	Jimmie Johnson	Hendrick Motorsports	Chevrolet
19	21	Matt DiBenedetto	Wood Brothers Racing	Ford
20	37	Ryan Preece	JTG Daugherty Racing	Chevrolet
21	3	Austin Dillon	Richard Childress Racing	Chevrolet
22	95	Christopher Bell (R)	Leavine Family Racing	Toyota
23	17	Chris Buescher	Roush Fenway Racing	Ford
24	13	Ty Dillon	Germain Racing	Chevrolet
25	8	Tyler Reddick (R)	Richard Childress Racing	Chevrolet
26	47	Ricky Stenhouse Jr.	JTG Daugherty Racing	Chevrolet
27	43	Bubba Wallace	Richard Petty Motorsports	Chevrolet
28	34	Michael McDowell	Front Row Motorsports	Ford
29	38	John Hunter Nemechek (R)	Front Row Motorsports	Ford
30	32	Corey LaJoie	Go Fas Racing	Ford
31	53	Joey Gase (i)	Rick Ware Racing	Ford
32	00	Quin Houff (R)	StarCom Racing	Chevrolet
33	15	Brennan Poole (R)	Premium Motorsports	Chevrolet
34	51	Garrett Smithley	Petty Ware Racing	Chevrolet
35	96	Daniel Suárez	Gaunt Brothers Racing	Toyota
36	77	Reed Sorenson	Spire Motorsports	Chevrolet
37	52	J. J. Yeley (i)	Rick Ware Racing	Ford
38	66	Timmy Hill (i)	MBM Motorsports	Toyota
Official starting lineup

- Polesitter Kyle Busch, Denny Hamlin, and Christopher Bell all started at the back after failing inspection.

== Race ==
=== Stage Results ===
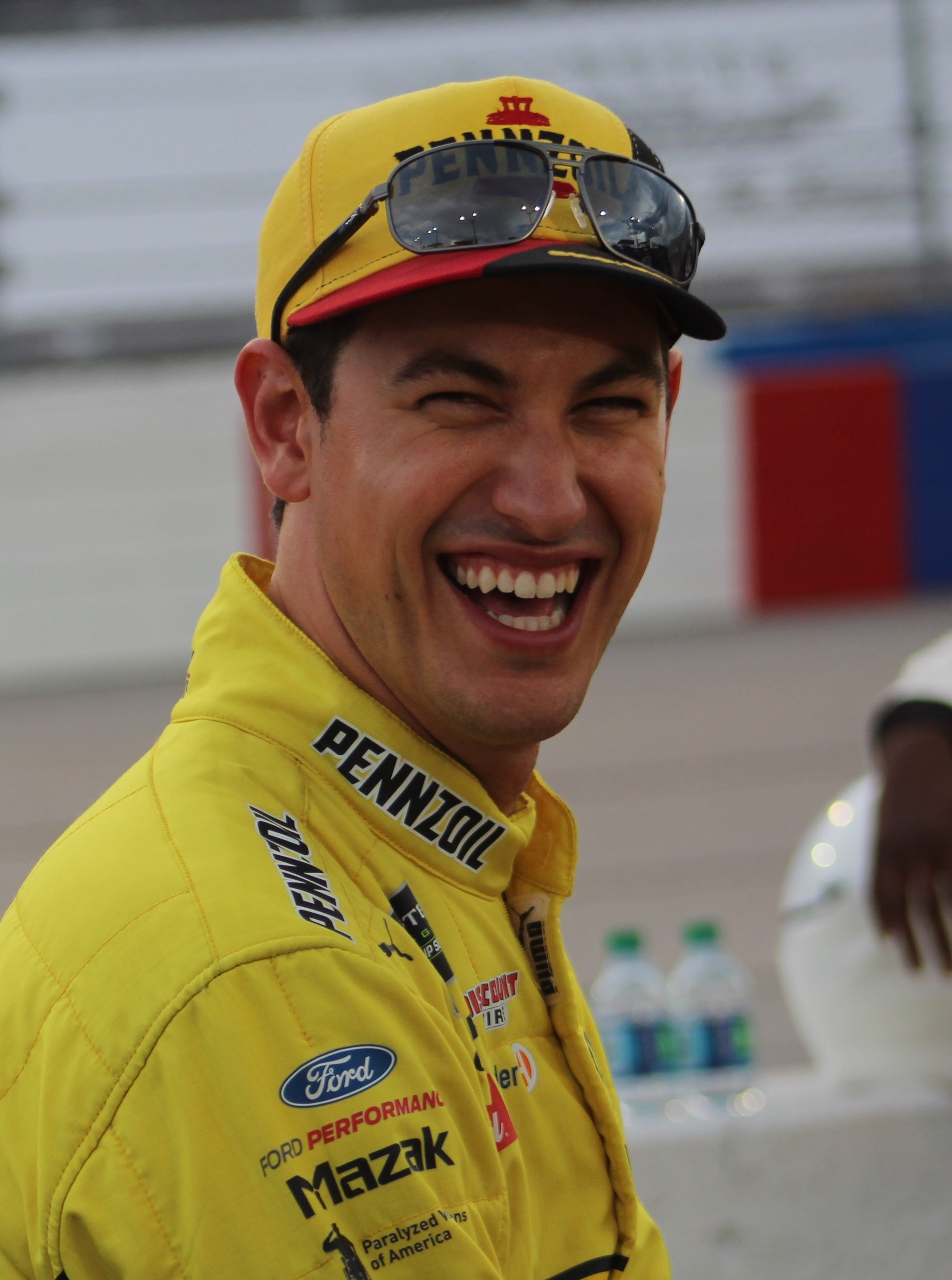
Joey Logano won the race.

Stage One Laps: 80

Pos	No	Driver	Team	Manufacturer	Points
1	9	Chase Elliott	Hendrick Motorsports	Chevrolet	10
2	19	Martin Truex Jr.	Joe Gibbs Racing	Toyota	9
3	4	Kevin Harvick	Stewart-Haas Racing	Ford	8
4	12	Ryan Blaney	Team Penske	Ford	7
5	22	Joey Logano	Team Penske	Ford	6
6	24	William Byron	Hendrick Motorsports	Chevrolet	5
7	42	Kyle Larson	Chip Ganassi Racing	Chevrolet	4
8	88	Alex Bowman	Hendrick Motorsports	Chevrolet	3
9	48	Jimmie Johnson	Hendrick Motorsports	Chevrolet	2
10	6	Ross Chastain (i)	Roush Fenway Racing	Ford	0
Official stage one results

Stage Two Laps: 80

Pos	No	Driver	Team	Manufacturer	Points
1	9	Chase Elliott	Hendrick Motorsports	Chevrolet	10
2	12	Ryan Blaney	Team Penske	Ford	9
3	19	Martin Truex Jr.	Joe Gibbs Racing	Toyota	8
4	24	William Byron	Hendrick Motorsports	Chevrolet	7
5	22	Joey Logano	Team Penske	Ford	6
6	4	Kevin Harvick	Stewart-Haas Racing	Ford	5
7	48	Jimmie Johnson	Hendrick Motorsports	Chevrolet	4
8	42	Kyle Larson	Chip Ganassi Racing	Chevrolet	3
9	88	Alex Bowman	Hendrick Motorsports	Chevrolet	2
10	18	Kyle Busch	Joe Gibbs Racing	Toyota	1
Official stage two results

=== Final Stage Results ===
Stage Three Laps: 107

Pos	Grid	No	Driver	Team	Manufacturer	Laps	Points
1	5	22	Joey Logano	Team Penske	Ford	267	52
2	19	21	Matt DiBenedetto	Wood Brothers Racing	Ford	267	35
3	26	47	Ricky Stenhouse Jr.	JTG Daugherty Racing	Chevrolet	267	34
4	21	3	Austin Dillon	Richard Childress Racing	Chevrolet	267	33
5	18	48	Jimmie Johnson	Hendrick Motorsports	Chevrolet	267	38
6	27	43	Bubba Wallace	Richard Petty Motorsports	Chevrolet	267	31
7	8	2	Brad Keselowski	Team Penske	Ford	267	30
8	3	4	Kevin Harvick	Stewart-Haas Racing	Ford	267	42
9	6	42	Kyle Larson	Chip Ganassi Racing	Chevrolet	267	35
10	24	13	Ty Dillon	Germain Racing	Chevrolet	267	27
11	7	12	Ryan Blaney	Team Penske	Ford	267	42
12	9	14	Clint Bowyer	Stewart-Haas Racing	Ford	267	25
13	12	88	Alex Bowman	Hendrick Motorsports	Chevrolet	267	29
14	23	17	Chris Buescher	Roush Fenway Racing	Ford	267	23
15	1	18	Kyle Busch	Joe Gibbs Racing	Toyota	267	23
16	30	32	Corey LaJoie	Go Fas Racing	Ford	267	21
17	4	11	Denny Hamlin	Joe Gibbs Racing	Toyota	267	20
18	25	8	Tyler Reddick (R)	Richard Childress Racing	Chevrolet	267	19
19	17	41	Cole Custer (R)	Stewart-Haas Racing	Ford	267	18
20	2	19	Martin Truex Jr.	Joe Gibbs Racing	Toyota	267	34
21	14	10	Aric Almirola	Stewart-Haas Racing	Ford	267	16
22	11	24	William Byron	Hendrick Motorsports	Chevrolet	267	27
23	16	20	Erik Jones	Joe Gibbs Racing	Toyota	267	14
24	29	38	John Hunter Nemechek (R)	Front Row Motorsports	Ford	267	13
25	13	1	Kurt Busch	Chip Ganassi Racing	Chevrolet	266	12
26	10	9	Chase Elliott	Hendrick Motorsports	Chevrolet	266	31
27	15	6	Ross Chastain (i)	Roush Fenway Racing	Ford	265	0
28	37	52	J. J. Yeley (i)	Rick Ware Racing	Ford	264	0
29	33	15	Brennan Poole (R)	Premium Motorsports	Chevrolet	264	8
30	35	96	Daniel Suárez	Gaunt Brothers Racing	Toyota	263	7
31	31	53	Joey Gase (i)	Rick Ware Racing	Ford	258	0
32	32	00	Quin Houff (R)	StarCom Racing	Chevrolet	258	5
33	22	95	Christopher Bell (R)	Leavine Family Racing	Toyota	257	4
34	36	77	Reed Sorenson	Spire Motorsports	Chevrolet	253	3
35	34	51	Garrett Smithley	Petty Ware Racing	Chevrolet	252	2
36	28	34	Michael McDowell	Front Row Motorsports	Ford	245	1
37	20	37	Ryan Preece	JTG Daugherty Racing	Chevrolet	222	1
38	38	66	Timmy Hill (i)	MBM Motorsports	Toyota	175	0
Official race results

=== Race statistics ===
- Lead changes: 25 among 7 different drivers
- Cautions/Laps: 9 for 37
- Red flags: 0
- Time of race: 2 hours, 58 minutes and 11 seconds
- Average speed: 134.861 miles per hour (217.038 km/h)

== Media ==
=== Television ===
Fox Sports covered their 20th race at the Las Vegas Motor Speedway. Mike Joy and 2001 race winner Jeff Gordon called from the booth for the race. Jamie Little, Regan Smith, Vince Welch and Matt Yocum handled the pit road duties for the television side. Larry McReynolds and Jamie McMurray provided insight from the Fox Sports studio in Charlotte.

Fox
Booth announcers	Pit reporters	In-race analysts
Lap-by-lap: Mike Joy; Color-commentator: Jeff Gordon	Jamie Little; Regan Smith; Vince Welch; Matt Yocum	Larry McReynolds; Jamie McMurray

=== Radio ===
PRN covered the radio call for the race which was simulcasted on Sirius XM NASCAR Radio. Doug Rice and Mark Garrow called the race in the booth when the field raced through the tri-oval. Rob Albright called the race from a billboard in turn 2 when the field raced through turns 1 and 2. Pat Patterson called the race from a billboard outside of turn 3 when the field raced through turns 3 and 4. Brad Gillie, Brett McMillan, Wendy Venturini and Heather DeBeaux worked pit road for the radio side.

PRN
Booth announcers	Turn announcers	Pit reporters
Lead announcer: Doug Rice; Announcer: Mark Garrow	Turns 1 & 2: Rob Albright; Turns 3 & 4: Pat Patterson	Brad Gillie; Brett McMillan; Wendy Venturini; Heather DeBeaux

== Standings after the race ==
Drivers' Championship standings

	Pos	Driver	Points
1	1	Ryan Blaney	85
11	2	Joey Logano	82 (–3)
	3	Kevin Harvick	81 (–4)
2	4	Kyle Larson	70 (–15)
4	5	Ricky Stenhouse Jr.	66 (–19)
1	6	Chase Elliott	65 (–20)
5	7	Austin Dillon	63 (–22)
4	8	Chris Buescher	61 (–24)
8	9	Denny Hamlin	60 (–25)
7	10	Matt DiBenedetto	60 (–25)
10	11	Jimmie Johnson	60 (–25)
3	12	Bubba Wallace	59 (–26)
2	13	Clint Bowyer	56 (–29)
6	14	Alex Bowman	51 (–34)
1	15	Corey LaJoie	50 (–35)
8	16	Martin Truex Jr.	50 (–35)
Official driver's standings

Manufacturers' Championship standings

	Pos	Manufacturer	Points
1	1	Ford	75
1	2	Chevrolet	64 (–11)
2	3	Toyota	62 (–13)

- Note: Only the first 16 positions are included for the driver standings.

Previous race: 2020 Daytona 500	NASCAR Cup Series; 2020 season	Next race: 2020 Auto Club 400
