= 2020 FanShield 500 =

NASCAR Cup Series race

Race details
- Race 4 of 36 in the 2020 NASCAR Cup Series
- The 2020 FanShield 500 program cover, featuring Kyle Busch. "Speed Fest!"
- Date: March 8, 2020
- Location: Phoenix Raceway in Avondale, Arizona
- Course: Permanent racing facility
- Course length: 1.022 miles (1.645 km)
- Distance: 316 laps, 322.952 mi (519.742 km)
- Scheduled distance: 312 laps, 318.864 mi (513.162 km)
- Average speed: 94.407 miles per hour (151.933 km/h)

Pole position
Driver	Chase Elliott	Hendrick Motorsports
- Time: 26.065

Most laps led
Driver	Chase Elliott	Hendrick Motorsports
- Laps: 94

Winner
No. 22	Joey Logano	Team Penske

Television in the United States
- Network: Fox
- Announcers: Mike Joy and Jeff Gordon
- Nielsen ratings: 4.575 million

Radio in the United States
- Radio: MRN
- Booth announcers: Alex Hayden, Jeff Striegle, and Rusty Wallace
- Turn announcers: Kurt Becker (1 & 2) and Dan Hubbard (3 & 4)

The 2020 FanShield 500 was a NASCAR Cup Series race held on March 8, 2020, at Phoenix Raceway in Avondale, Arizona. Contested over 316 laps—extended from 312 laps due to an overtime finish, on the 1.022 mi (1.645 km) oval, it was the fourth race of the 2020 NASCAR Cup Series season. This was the last race to run before the season was put on hold due to the COVID-19 pandemic.

== Report ==
=== Background ===
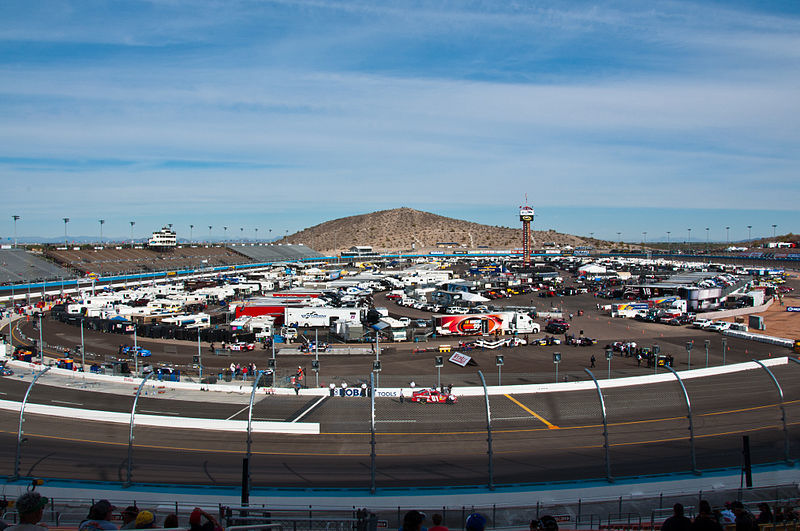
Phoenix Raceway was the site of the fourth race of the season

Phoenix Raceway, is a 1.022 mi (1.645 km), low-banked tri-oval race track located in Avondale, Arizona. The motorsport track opened in 1964 and currently hosts two NASCAR race weekends annually. PIR has also hosted the IndyCar Series, CART, USAC and the Rolex Sports Car Series. The raceway is currently owned and operated by International Speedway Corporation.

The race would be Kyle Larson's final race with Chip Ganassi Racing before he was released from the team after using a racial slur during the eventual season's hiatus.

==== Entry list ====
- (R) denotes rookie driver.
- (i) denotes driver who are ineligible for series driver points.

No.	Driver	Team	Manufacturer
00	Quin Houff (R)	StarCom Racing	Chevrolet
1	Kurt Busch	Chip Ganassi Racing	Chevrolet
2	Brad Keselowski	Team Penske	Ford
3	Austin Dillon	Richard Childress Racing	Chevrolet
4	Kevin Harvick	Stewart-Haas Racing	Ford
6	Ross Chastain (i)	Roush Fenway Racing	Ford
8	Tyler Reddick (R)	Richard Childress Racing	Chevrolet
9	Chase Elliott	Hendrick Motorsports	Chevrolet
10	Aric Almirola	Stewart-Haas Racing	Ford
11	Denny Hamlin	Joe Gibbs Racing	Toyota
12	Ryan Blaney	Team Penske	Ford
13	Ty Dillon	Germain Racing	Chevrolet
14	Clint Bowyer	Stewart-Haas Racing	Ford
15	Brennan Poole (R)	Premium Motorsports	Chevrolet
17	Chris Buescher	Roush Fenway Racing	Ford
18	Kyle Busch	Joe Gibbs Racing	Toyota
19	Martin Truex Jr.	Joe Gibbs Racing	Toyota
20	Erik Jones	Joe Gibbs Racing	Toyota
21	Matt DiBenedetto	Wood Brothers Racing	Ford
22	Joey Logano	Team Penske	Ford
24	William Byron	Hendrick Motorsports	Chevrolet
32	Corey LaJoie	Go Fas Racing	Ford
34	Michael McDowell	Front Row Motorsports	Ford
37	Ryan Preece	JTG Daugherty Racing	Chevrolet
38	John Hunter Nemechek (R)	Front Row Motorsports	Ford
41	Cole Custer (R)	Stewart-Haas Racing	Ford
42	Kyle Larson	Chip Ganassi Racing	Chevrolet
43	Bubba Wallace	Richard Petty Motorsports	Chevrolet
47	Ricky Stenhouse Jr.	JTG Daugherty Racing	Chevrolet
48	Jimmie Johnson	Hendrick Motorsports	Chevrolet
51	Garrett Smithley	Petty Ware Racing	Chevrolet
52	J. J. Yeley (i)	Rick Ware Racing	Ford
53	Joey Gase (i)	Rick Ware Racing	Chevrolet
66	Timmy Hill (i)	MBM Motorsports	Toyota
77	Reed Sorenson	Spire Motorsports	Chevrolet
88	Alex Bowman	Hendrick Motorsports	Chevrolet
95	Christopher Bell (R)	Leavine Family Racing	Toyota
96	Daniel Suárez	Gaunt Brothers Racing	Toyota
Official entry list

== Practice ==
Ryan Newman made a return to the race track as a visitor for the first time after his crash at the Daytona 500, where he was injured, three weeks earlier.

=== First practice ===
William Byron was the fastest in the first practice session with a time of 26.747 seconds and a speed of 134.595 mph (216.610 km/h).

Pos	No.	Driver	Team	Manufacturer	Time	Speed
1	24	William Byron	Hendrick Motorsports	Chevrolet	26.747	134.595
2	9	Chase Elliott	Hendrick Motorsports	Chevrolet	26.896	133.849
3	2	Brad Keselowski	Team Penske	Ford	27.005	133.309
Official first practice results

=== Final practice ===
Chase Elliott was the fastest in the final practice session with a time of 26.823 seconds and a speed of 134.213 mph (215.995 km/h).

Pos	No.	Driver	Team	Manufacturer	Time	Speed
1	9	Chase Elliott	Hendrick Motorsports	Chevrolet	26.823	134.213
2	18	Kyle Busch	Joe Gibbs Racing	Toyota	26.825	134.203
3	10	Aric Almirola	Stewart-Haas Racing	Ford	26.935	133.655
Official final practice results

== Qualifying ==
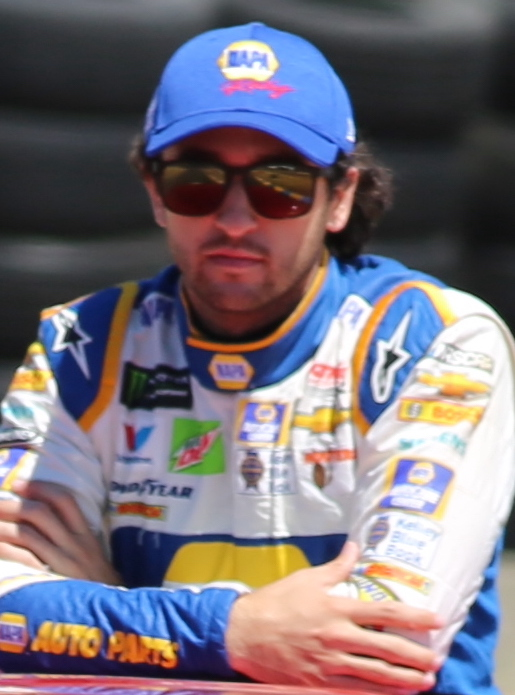
Chase Elliott scored the pole position.

Chase Elliott scored the pole for the race with a time of 26.065 and a speed of 138.116 mph (222.276 km/h).

=== Qualifying results ===
Pos	No.	Driver	Team	Manufacturer	Time
1	9	Chase Elliott	Hendrick Motorsports	Chevrolet	26.065
2	4	Kevin Harvick	Stewart-Haas Racing	Ford	26.110
3	11	Denny Hamlin	Joe Gibbs Racing	Toyota	26.117
4	42	Kyle Larson	Chip Ganassi Racing	Chevrolet	26.162
5	12	Ryan Blaney	Team Penske	Ford	26.190
6	10	Aric Almirola	Stewart-Haas Racing	Ford	26.190
7	1	Kurt Busch	Chip Ganassi Racing	Chevrolet	26.197
8	88	Alex Bowman	Hendrick Motorsports	Chevrolet	26.216
9	21	Matt DiBenedetto	Wood Brothers Racing	Ford	26.222
10	18	Kyle Busch	Joe Gibbs Racing	Toyota	26.230
11	20	Erik Jones	Joe Gibbs Racing	Toyota	26.257
12	19	Martin Truex Jr.	Joe Gibbs Racing	Toyota	26.278
13	22	Joey Logano	Team Penske	Ford	26.287
14	2	Brad Keselowski	Team Penske	Ford	26.289
15	95	Christopher Bell (R)	Leavine Family Racing	Toyota	26.295
16	41	Cole Custer (R)	Stewart-Haas Racing	Ford	26.339
17	24	William Byron	Hendrick Motorsports	Chevrolet	26.364
18	14	Clint Bowyer	Stewart-Haas Racing	Ford	26.388
19	47	Ricky Stenhouse Jr.	JTG Daugherty Racing	Chevrolet	26.448
20	37	Ryan Preece	JTG Daugherty Racing	Chevrolet	26.449
21	48	Jimmie Johnson	Hendrick Motorsports	Chevrolet	26.481
22	34	Michael McDowell	Front Row Motorsports	Ford	26.502
23	17	Chris Buescher	Roush Fenway Racing	Ford	26.512
24	6	Ross Chastain (i)	Roush Fenway Racing	Ford	26.527
25	13	Ty Dillon	Germain Racing	Chevrolet	26.528
26	38	John Hunter Nemechek (R)	Front Row Motorsports	Ford	26.541
27	43	Bubba Wallace	Richard Petty Motorsports	Chevrolet	26.635
28	32	Corey LaJoie	Go Fas Racing	Ford	26.668
29	8	Tyler Reddick (R)	Richard Childress Racing	Chevrolet	26.693
30	3	Austin Dillon	Richard Childress Racing	Chevrolet	26.772
31	96	Daniel Suárez	Gaunt Brothers Racing	Toyota	26.873
32	15	Brennan Poole (R)	Premium Motorsports	Chevrolet	26.909
33	52	J. J. Yeley (i)	Rick Ware Racing	Ford	27.169
34	00	Quin Houff (R)	StarCom Racing	Chevrolet	27.211
35	77	Reed Sorenson	Spire Motorsports	Chevrolet	27.395
36	51	Garrett Smithley	Petty Ware Racing	Chevrolet	27.464
37	53	Joey Gase (i)	Rick Ware Racing	Chevrolet	27.533
38	66	Timmy Hill (i)	MBM Motorsports	Toyota	27.584
Official qualifying results

== Race recap ==
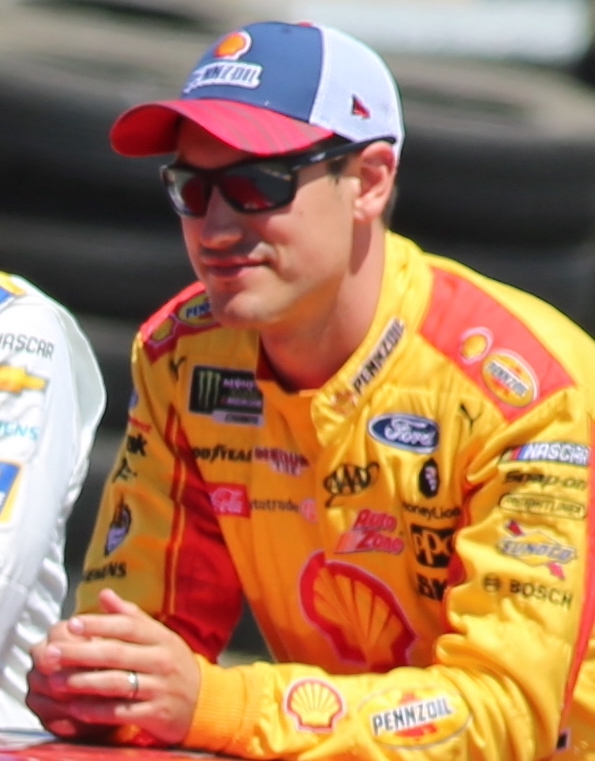
Joey Logano won the race.

Before the race, for the O'Reilly Pre-Race Party, the Arizonian band Harry Luge Band would play a concert in the InField two hours before the race. Wrestler Anthony Robles would try and break the Guinness record for most pull ups with an 80 pound bag, which he succeeded. Country music star Blake Shelton and Pitbull would perform Get Ready and introduce drivers. Skylar Astin, star from "Zoey's Extraordinary Playlist", would sing the national anthem. Four F-35s from Luke Air Force Base would perform the fly over at the end of the national anthem. Hudson Derbyshire, son of the CEO of FanShield, Bryan (who accompanied him, along with his mom) would give out the starting command.

=== Stage One ===
The start of the race showed pole sitter Chase Elliott pull out to the lead with Kevin Harvick following behind. Kyle Larson, in what would be his last race with Chip Ganassi Racing passed Harvick on lap 2. While the leaders were pulling away from each other, there were lots of battles for position in the midfield, including Martin Truex Jr. fighting his way up to the front after having to start at the rear. The traction compound poured on the track, PJ1, was a big factor throughout the race as it provided different grooves to run on. With around 40 laps to go in the stage, Denny Hamlin and Matt DiBenedetto were fighting for position. Also, Harvick had caught up to Elliott, and was battling him for the lead, and would keep fighting until lap 57, when Ricky Stenhouse Jr., trying to pass the lapped car of Joey Gase hit Gase's left quarter panel and spun into the wall, damaging the back end of his car.

During pit stops, all the lead lap cars decided to pit. Stenhouse was the leader coming off of pit road, but took no tires. Harvick would finally be able to grab the lead off of Elliott, with his crew having a faster time. Elliott would come up 2nd, then Hamlin in 3rd, DiBenedetto in fourth, and Logano rounding out the top 5.

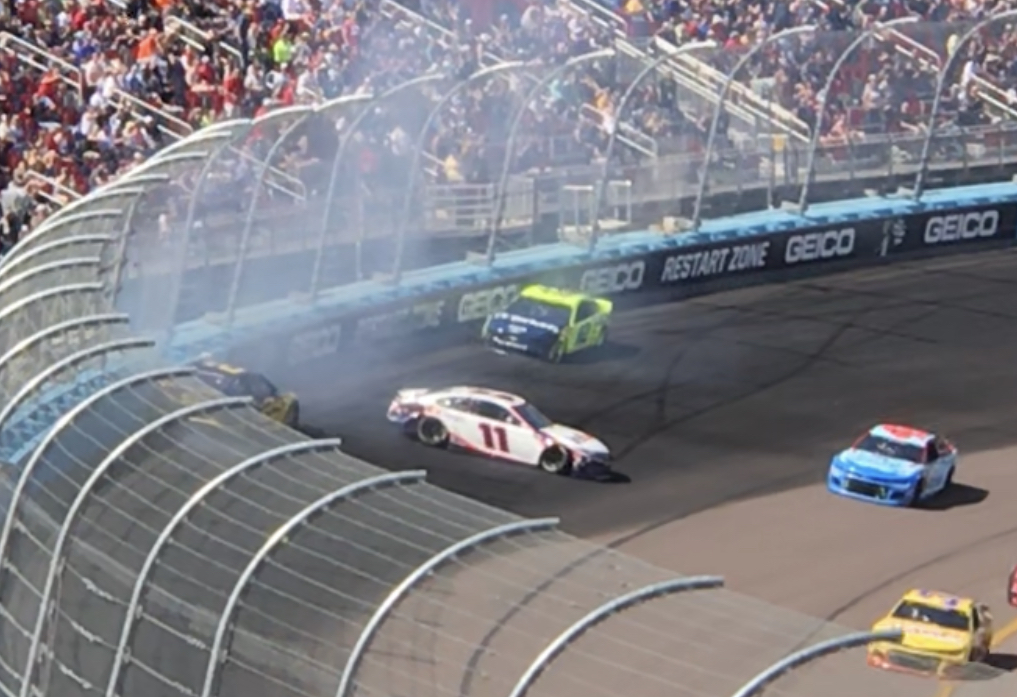
A crash on lap 64, involving Ryan Blaney, Denny Hamlin, and Brad Keselowski. Blaney would retire due to damage sustained from the crash.

During the lap 64 restart, Harvick would pull out to the lead; however, this would be short lived, as while Hamlin was battling for position, Hamlin's car got loose and went up the racetrack, collecting the nearby cars of Brad Keselowski and Ryan Blaney and sending all three into the outside wall. Keselowski would not suffer much damage, contrary to his teammate, Blaney who had to retire from the race. Hamlin would also be plagued with damage.

With a 4 lap dash to the end of the stage, Harvick and Elliott would duke it out, with Logano following closely behind. However, Harvick would pull out the lead and win the stage. Meanwhile, Erik Jones would win the final stage points in a tough battle with Clint Bowyer.

== Race ==
=== Stage Results ===
Stage One Laps: 75

Pos	No	Driver	Team	Manufacturer	Points
1	4	Kevin Harvick	Stewart-Haas Racing	Ford	10
2	9	Chase Elliott	Hendrick Motorsports	Chevrolet	9
3	22	Joey Logano	Team Penske	Ford	8
4	21	Matt DiBenedetto	Wood Brothers Racing	Ford	7
5	18	Kyle Busch	Joe Gibbs Racing	Toyota	6
6	88	Alex Bowman	Hendrick Motorsports	Chevrolet	5
7	19	Martin Truex Jr.	Joe Gibbs Racing	Toyota	4
8	10	Aric Almirola	Stewart-Haas Racing	Ford	3
9	8	Tyler Reddick (R)	Richard Childress Racing	Chevrolet	2
10	20	Erik Jones	Joe Gibbs Racing	Toyota	1
Official stage one results

Stage Two Laps: 115

Pos	No	Driver	Team	Manufacturer	Points
1	2	Brad Keselowski	Team Penske	Ford	10
2	4	Kevin Harvick	Stewart-Haas Racing	Ford	9
3	19	Martin Truex Jr.	Joe Gibbs Racing	Toyota	8
4	8	Tyler Reddick (R)	Richard Childress Racing	Chevrolet	7
5	18	Kyle Busch	Joe Gibbs Racing	Toyota	6
6	10	Aric Almirola	Stewart-Haas Racing	Ford	5
7	22	Joey Logano	Team Penske	Ford	4
8	14	Clint Bowyer	Stewart-Haas Racing	Ford	3
9	42	Kyle Larson	Chip Ganassi Racing	Chevrolet	2
10	41	Cole Custer (R)	Stewart-Haas Racing	Ford	1
Official stage two results

=== Final Stage Results ===
Stage Three Laps: 122

Pos	Grid	No	Driver	Team	Manufacturer	Laps	Points
1	13	22	Joey Logano	Team Penske	Ford	316	52
2	2	4	Kevin Harvick	Stewart-Haas Racing	Ford	316	54
3	10	18	Kyle Busch	Joe Gibbs Racing	Toyota	316	46
4	4	42	Kyle Larson	Chip Ganassi Racing	Chevrolet	316	35
5	18	14	Clint Bowyer	Stewart-Haas Racing	Ford	316	35
6	7	1	Kurt Busch	Chip Ganassi Racing	Chevrolet	316	31
7	1	9	Chase Elliott	Hendrick Motorsports	Chevrolet	316	39
8	6	10	Aric Almirola	Stewart-Haas Racing	Ford	316	37
9	16	41	Cole Custer (R)	Stewart-Haas Racing	Ford	316	29
10	17	24	William Byron	Hendrick Motorsports	Chevrolet	316	27
11	14	2	Brad Keselowski	Team Penske	Ford	316	36
12	21	48	Jimmie Johnson	Hendrick Motorsports	Chevrolet	316	25
13	9	21	Matt DiBenedetto	Wood Brothers Racing	Ford	316	31
14	8	88	Alex Bowman	Hendrick Motorsports	Chevrolet	316	28
15	25	13	Ty Dillon	Germain Racing	Chevrolet	316	22
16	22	34	Michael McDowell	Front Row Motorsports	Ford	316	21
17	23	17	Chris Buescher	Roush Fenway Racing	Ford	316	20
18	20	37	Ryan Preece	JTG Daugherty Racing	Chevrolet	316	19
19	27	43	Bubba Wallace	Richard Petty Motorsports	Chevrolet	316	18
20	3	11	Denny Hamlin	Joe Gibbs Racing	Toyota	316	17
21	31	96	Daniel Suárez	Gaunt Brothers Racing	Toyota	316	16
22	19	47	Ricky Stenhouse Jr.	JTG Daugherty Racing	Chevrolet	316	15
23	24	6	Ross Chastain (i)	Roush Fenway Racing	Ford	316	0
24	15	95	Christopher Bell (R)	Leavine Family Racing	Toyota	316	13
25	26	38	John Hunter Nemechek (R)	Front Row Motorsports	Chevrolet	316	12
26	33	52	J. J. Yeley (i)	Rick Ware Racing	Ford	316	0
27	28	32	Corey LaJoie	Go Fas Racing	Ford	316	11
28	11	20	Erik Jones	Joe Gibbs Racing	Toyota	313	10
29	37	53	Joey Gase (i)	Rick Ware Racing	Chevrolet	313	0
30	35	77	Reed Sorenson	Spire Motorsports	Chevrolet	312	7
31	32	15	Brennan Poole (R)	Premium Motorsports	Chevrolet	292	6
32	12	19	Martin Truex Jr.	Joe Gibbs Racing	Toyota	282	17
33	29	8	Tyler Reddick (R)	Richard Childress Racing	Chevrolet	264	13
34	34	00	Quin Houff (R)	StarCom Racing	Chevrolet	208	3
35	36	51	Garrett Smithley	Petty Ware Racing	Chevrolet	181	2
36	30	3	Austin Dillon	Richard Childress Racing	Chevrolet	129	1
37	5	12	Ryan Blaney	Team Penske	Ford	65	1
38	38	66	Timmy Hill (i)	MBM Motorsports	Toyota	51	0
Official race results

=== Race statistics ===
- Lead changes: 20 among 7 different drivers
- Cautions/Laps: 12 for 73
- Red flags: 0
- Time of race: 3 hours, 20 minutes and 50 seconds
- Average speed: 94.407 miles per hour (151.933 km/h)

== Media ==
=== Television ===
Fox Sports covered their 16th race at the Phoenix Raceway. Mike Joy and two-time Phoenix winner Jeff Gordon called the race from the broadcast booth, the last time Fox would have commentators in the booth at the track for the season, and the last for either of NASCAR's television partners until the Charlotte road course race. Jamie Little, Regan Smith, Vince Welch and Matt Yocum handled the pit road duties. Larry McReynolds and Jamie McMurray provided insight from the Fox Sports studio in Charlotte.

Fox
Booth announcers	Pit reporters	In-race analysts
Lap-by-lap: Mike Joy; Color-commentator: Jeff Gordon	Jamie Little; Regan Smith; Vince Welch; Matt Yocum	Larry McReynolds; Jamie McMurray

=== Radio ===
MRN covered the radio action for the race which was also simulcasted on Sirius XM NASCAR Radio. Alex Hayden, Jeff Striegle, and 1989 NASCAR Winston Cup Champion Rusty Wallace called the race when the field raced past the start/finish line. Kurt Becker called the action from turns 1 & 2 and Dan Hubbard called the action from turns 3 & 4. Pit lane was manned by Kim Coon, Steve Post, and Dillon Welch.

MRN
Booth announcers	Turn announcers	Pit reporters
Lead announcer: Alex Hayden; Announcer: Jeff Striegle; Announcer: Rusty Wallace	Turns 1 & 2: Kurt Becker; Turns 3 & 4: Dan Hubbard	Kim Coon; Steve Post; Dillon Welch

== Standings after the race ==
Drivers' Championship standings

	Pos	Driver	Points
3	1	Kevin Harvick	164
	2	Joey Logano	163 (–1)
3	3	Chase Elliott	144 (–20)
1	4	Alex Bowman	138 (–26)
	5	Jimmie Johnson	131 (–33)
5	6	Ryan Blaney	123 (–41)
2	7	Kyle Larson	121 (–43)
2	8	Aric Almirola	121 (–43)
1	9	Matt DiBenedetto	118 (–46)
2	10	Brad Keselowski	118 (–46)
4	11	Denny Hamlin	111 (–53)
7	12	Kyle Busch	111 (–53)
3	13	Clint Bowyer	105 (–59)
3	14	Chris Buescher	102 (–62)
2	15	Martin Truex Jr.	96 (–68)
5	16	Kurt Busch	90 (–74)
Official driver's standings

Manufacturers' Championship standings

Pos	Manufacturer	Points
1	Ford	147
2	Chevrolet	137 (–10)
3	Toyota	131 (–16)

- Note: Only the first 16 positions are included for the driver standings.

Previous race: 2020 Auto Club 400	NASCAR Cup Series; 2020 season	Next race: 2020 The Real Heroes 400
