= Leavine Family Racing =

American stock car racing team

- Owner(s): Bob Leavine; Sharon Leavine
- Base: Tyler, Texas; Concord, North Carolina
- Series: NASCAR Cup Series
- Manufacturer: Toyota
- Opened: 2011
- Closed: 2020

Career
- Debut: Cup Series: 2011 Samsung Mobile 500 (Texas); Nationwide Series: 2013 Dollar General 300 (Charlotte); ARCA Racing Series: 2011 Prairie Meadows 200 (Iowa)
- Latest race: NASCAR Cup Series: 2020 Season Finale 500 (Phoenix); Nationwide Series: 2013 Dollar General 300 (Charlotte); ARCA Racing Series: 2012 Kansas Lottery 98.9 (Kansas)
- Races competed: Total: 267; NASCAR Cup Series: 256; Nationwide Series: 1 ARCA Racing Series: 10
- Drivers' Championships: Total: 0 NASCAR Cup Series: 0 Nationwide Series: 0 ARCA Racing Series: 0
- Race victories: Total: 0 NASCAR Cup Series: 0 Nationwide Series: 0 ARCA Racing Series: 0
- Pole positions: Total: 0 NASCAR Cup Series: 0 Nationwide Series: 0 ARCA Racing Series: 0

Leavine Family Racing (formerly Circle Sport – Leavine Family Racing and originally Leavine Fenton Racing) was an American professional stock car racing team that last competed in the NASCAR Cup Series. Owned by Sharon and Bob Leavine, the team was headquartered in Tyler, Texas, but operated its racing team from a shop in Concord, North Carolina. In 2016, longtime NASCAR team owner Joe Falk became part of the ownership group, merging his Circle Sport operation with Leavine Family Racing, however as the 2016 season came to an end, Falk left the team securing his charter, and causing Leavine Family Racing to purchase a charter from Tommy Baldwin Racing.

Leavine Family Racing had a technical alliance with Joe Gibbs Racing, with Christopher Bell driving the No. 95 Toyota Camry. The team previously fielded Fords with a technical alliance with Team Penske from 2011 to 2015, and Chevrolets with a technical alliance with Richard Childress Racing from 2016 to 2018.

On July 23, 2020, it was reported that Bob Leavine solicited bids for the team due to the financial fallout of the COVID-19 pandemic. On August 4, Leavine confirmed that his team had been sold and would cease operations at the end of the 2020 season, with its fleet of Toyota cars to be returned to Joe Gibbs Racing. One week later, the team's assets were purchased by Spire Motorsports.

== NASCAR Cup Series ==
=== Car No. 95 history ===
David Starr (2011)

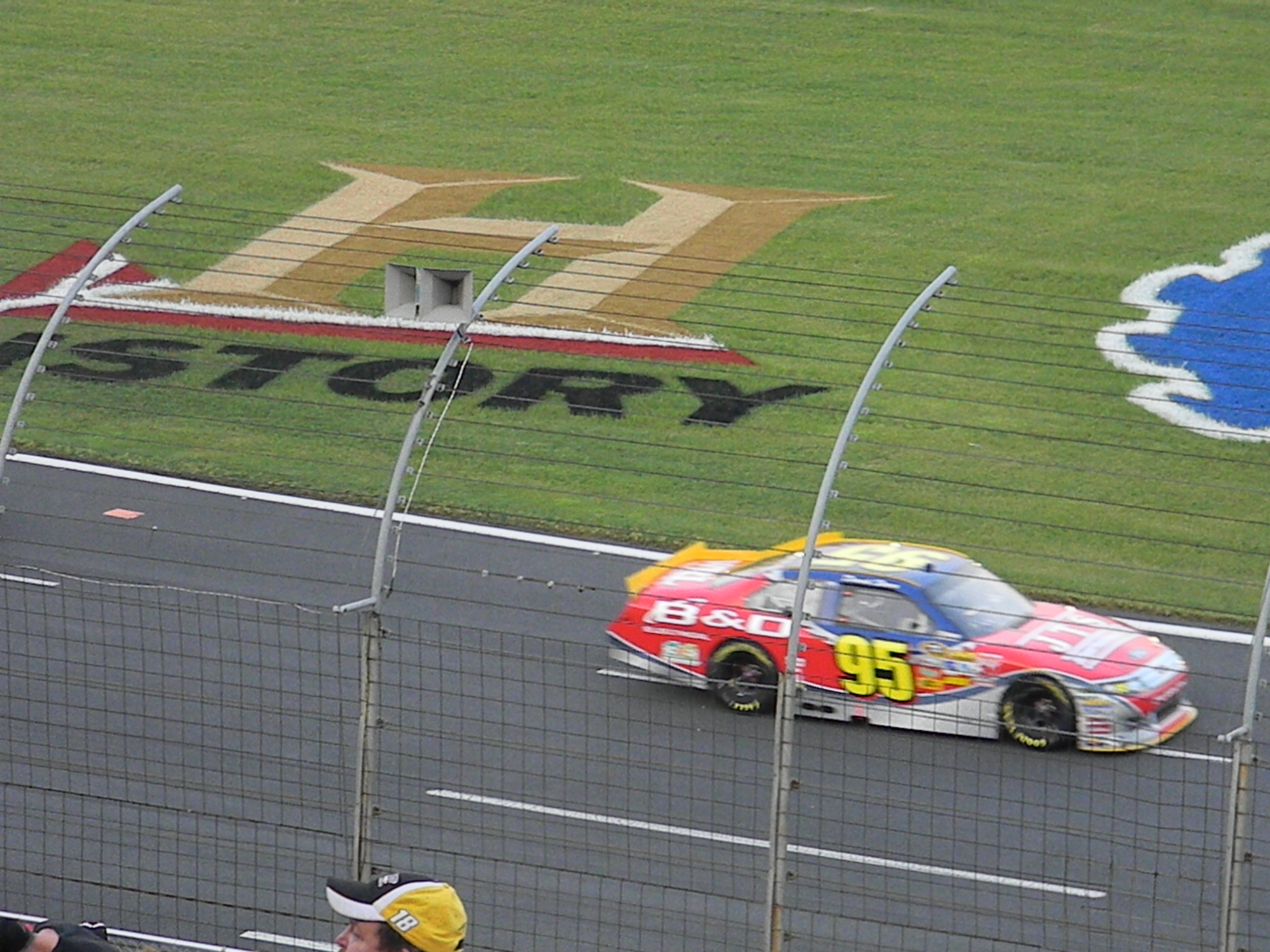
The team's 2011 car

Founded as Leavine Fenton Racing by Bob Leavine and Lance Fenton in early 2011, the team planned to compete on a limited basis in the Sprint Cup Series and Camping World Truck Series, with David Starr competing in the former for six events and Fenton driving in the latter for three. Based in Tyler, Texas but with its race shop in Concord, North Carolina, Lightning McQueen from the Cars movies was the inspiration for the team to use no. 95. the team made its debut in the Cup Series at Texas Motor Speedway in April of that year; Starr qualified for the race, his first in Sprint Cup competition, and finished 38th following an accident.

Following competing in the Sprint Showdown and Coca-Cola 600 at Charlotte Motor Speedway, the team announced that Fenton's share in the team had been acquired by Leavine and his wife, Sharon; the team was renamed as Leavine Family Racing. Fenton had not attempted any Truck Series events before leaving the team. After failing to qualify at Kentucky Speedway, the team next raced at Bristol Motor Speedway in August, scoring its best finish and Starr's career-best in the series, 27th; Leavine Family Racing and Starr would fail to qualify for events at Chicagoland Speedway, Kansas Speedway and in the fall at Texas Motor Speedway over the remainder of the year, only making one further race, at Atlanta Motor Speedway where they posted a 29th-place finish.

Scott Speed (2012–2013)

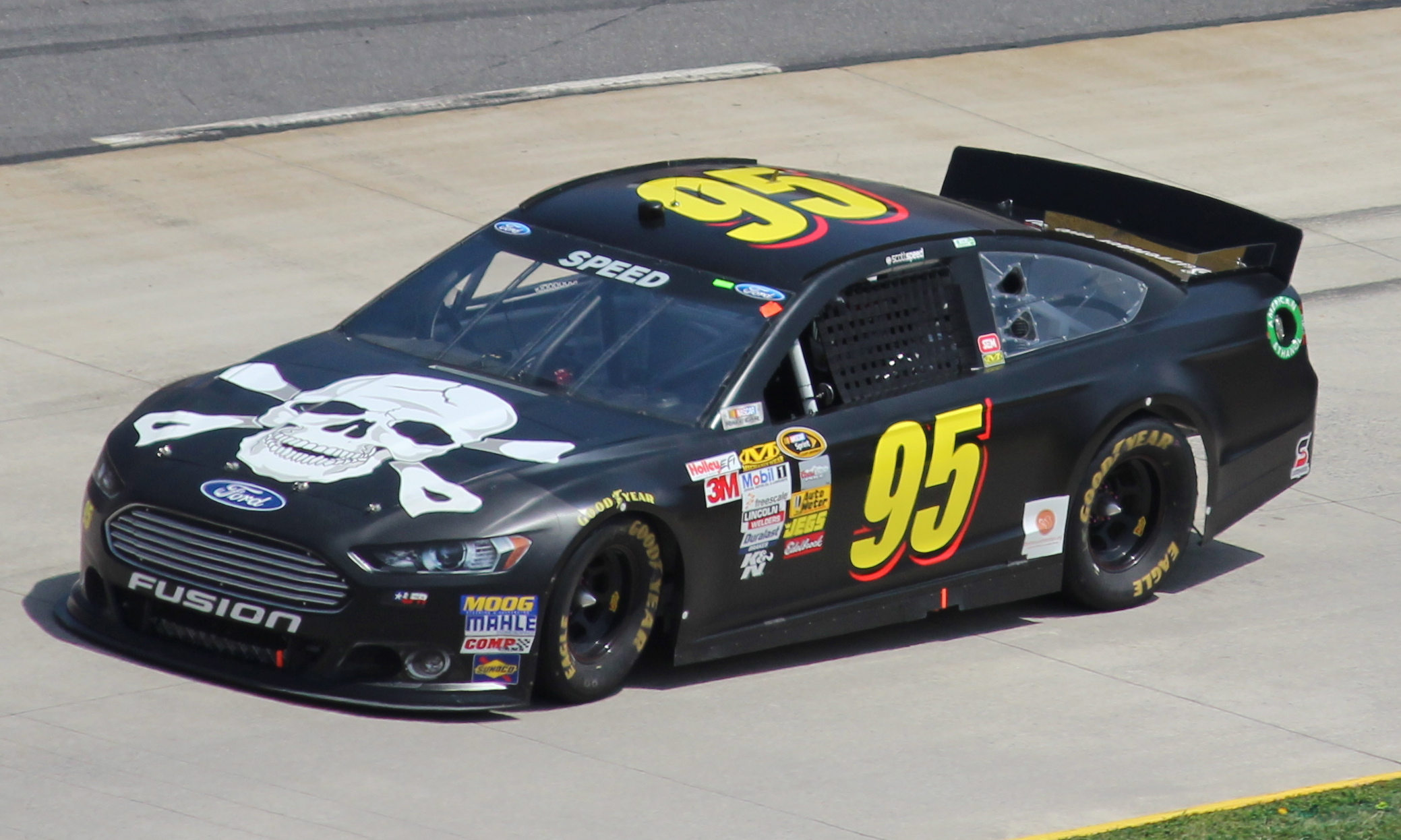
The team's 2013 car at Martinsville

Starr left Leavine Family Racing following the 2011 season; for 2012, Leavine hired Scott Speed to drive the team's No. 95 Fords in the Sprint Cup Series, with Wally Rogers as crew chief; a 15-race schedule in NASCAR's premier series was planned for the season. The team qualified for races with Speed at Richmond International Raceway and Charlotte Motor Speedway with Speed, starting and parking, before finishing 25th at Sonoma Raceway. The team also posted a 14th-place finish in the Sprint Showdown, a non-points event. At the 2012 Finger Lakes 355 at The Glen, Speed finished 17th.

In August 2012 Leavine Family Racing announced that it had re-signed Speed for the 2013 Sprint Cup Series season, intending to run 28 events on the 36 race schedule. The team had its best finish at the 2013 Aaron's 499 with a ninth-place finish, however, they started and parked most other events. Speed left the team after the Atlanta race, citing his frustration with the team's starting and parking and hinting that the plan had been to run more full races. He was replaced on an interim basis by Blake Koch, Scott Riggs, and Reed Sorenson.

Michael McDowell (2014–2017)

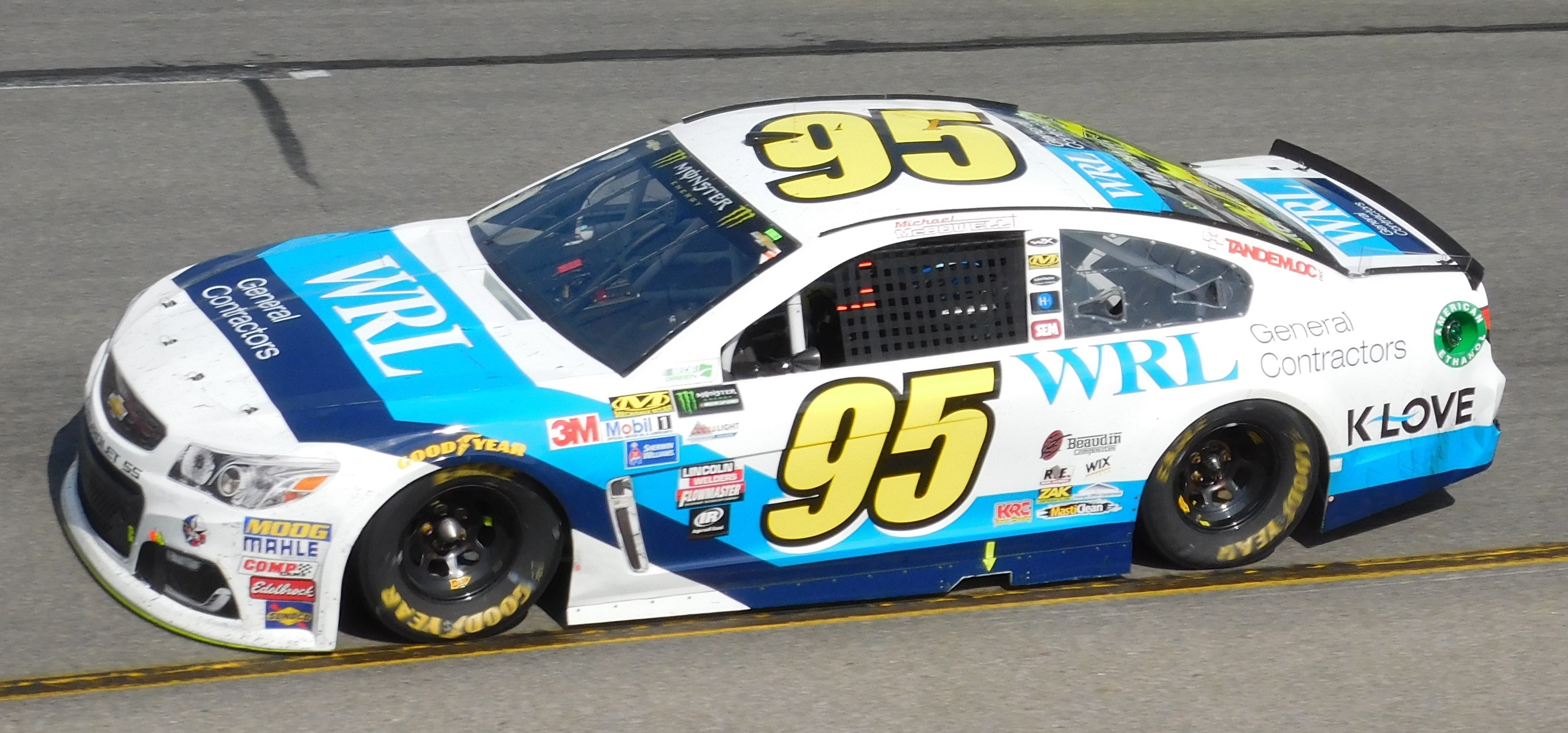
Michael McDowell in the No. 95 during the 2017 Toyota Owners 400

In October 2013, Leavine Family Racing announced that Michael McDowell would drive the team's No. 95 Ford Fusion Cup Series entry in 2014. They ran 20 of the 36 races. On January 28, 2014, Leavine announced that KLOVE, Thrivent Financial, and several other sponsors would sponsor all 20 scheduled races in the 2014 Sprint Cup season. The sponsorship meant the team would be able to run full races, and enabled it to ally with Team Penske.

At the 2014 Coke Zero 400, McDowell and Leavine Family Racing finished their career-best with a 7th-place finish in the rain-shortened event. The team's performance was much improved with the Penske alliance, and additional sponsorship allowed the team to run seven of the final eight events and 22 in total. The team finished 43rd in owners' points.

McDowell returned in 2015, as did K-LOVE and Thrivent. The team once again planned to run at least 20 races and maintained its Penske alliance. McDowell was able to make the Daytona 500, a race he had failed to qualify for in 2014. The team posted four DNQs in 2015, three of which were due to rainouts and an increase in full-time entries. In early summer, the team made the news in unfortunate fashion after part of their shop burned down. This forced them to take refuge on the Team Penske campus, inside their former sports car shop, until their facility was repaired enough for them to return. The team ultimately slipped slightly to 44th in owner points but did finish ahead of the No. 62, a team that attempted all 36 races.

In January 2016, longtime NASCAR team owner Joe Falk became an investor in Leavine Family Racing and the team switched to Chevrolet. Falk brought a charter granted to him, to the No. 95 team, guaranteeing the 95 its first full season of racing. The team formed an alliance with Richard Childress Racing. The No. 95 attempted all 36 races, with McDowell returning to run in at least 26 events with sponsorship from K-Love and Thrivent, and Ty Dillon driving in at max 10 races, with sponsorship from General Mills and AstraZeneca. McDowell ran the majority of the events, and ran the Daytona 500 in a second entry, the No. 59.

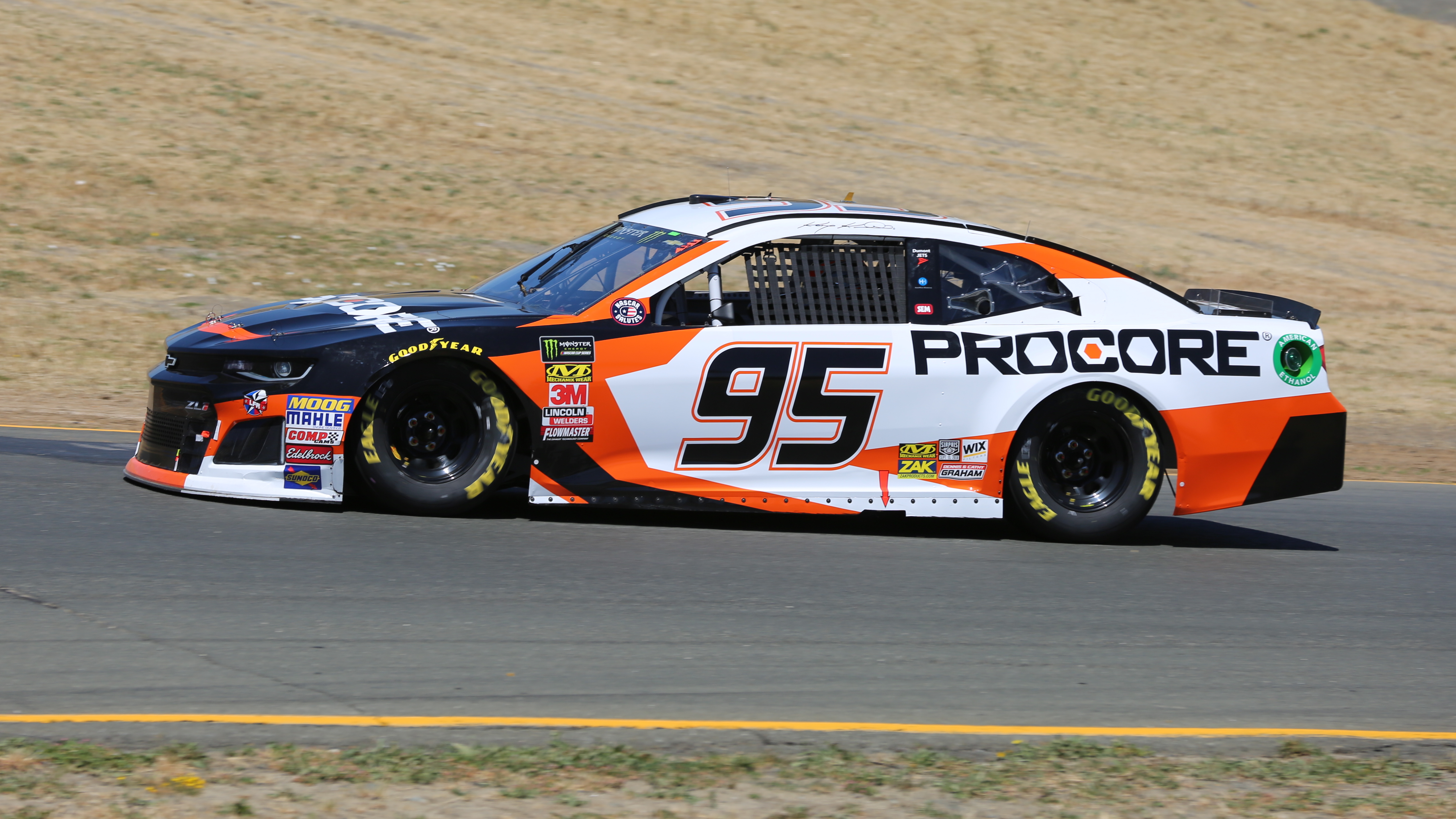
Kasey Kahne in the 95 at Sonoma Raceway in 2018

Kasey Kahne (2018)

On September 19, 2017, Leavine Family Racing announced former Hendrick Motorsports driver Kasey Kahne would be replacing McDowell in the No. 95 for the 2018 season. On August 16, 2018, Kahne announced that he will step away from full time competition at the end of the year. On September 6, 2018, after heat exhaustion from the Southern 500, Kahne announced that he would sit out the Brickyard 400, which became the first race he missed since he began his full-time Cup Series career. Regan Smith took the wheel of the No. 95 car in Kahne's absence. On October 9, Kahne announced that he will miss the rest of the season due to lingering medical conditions.

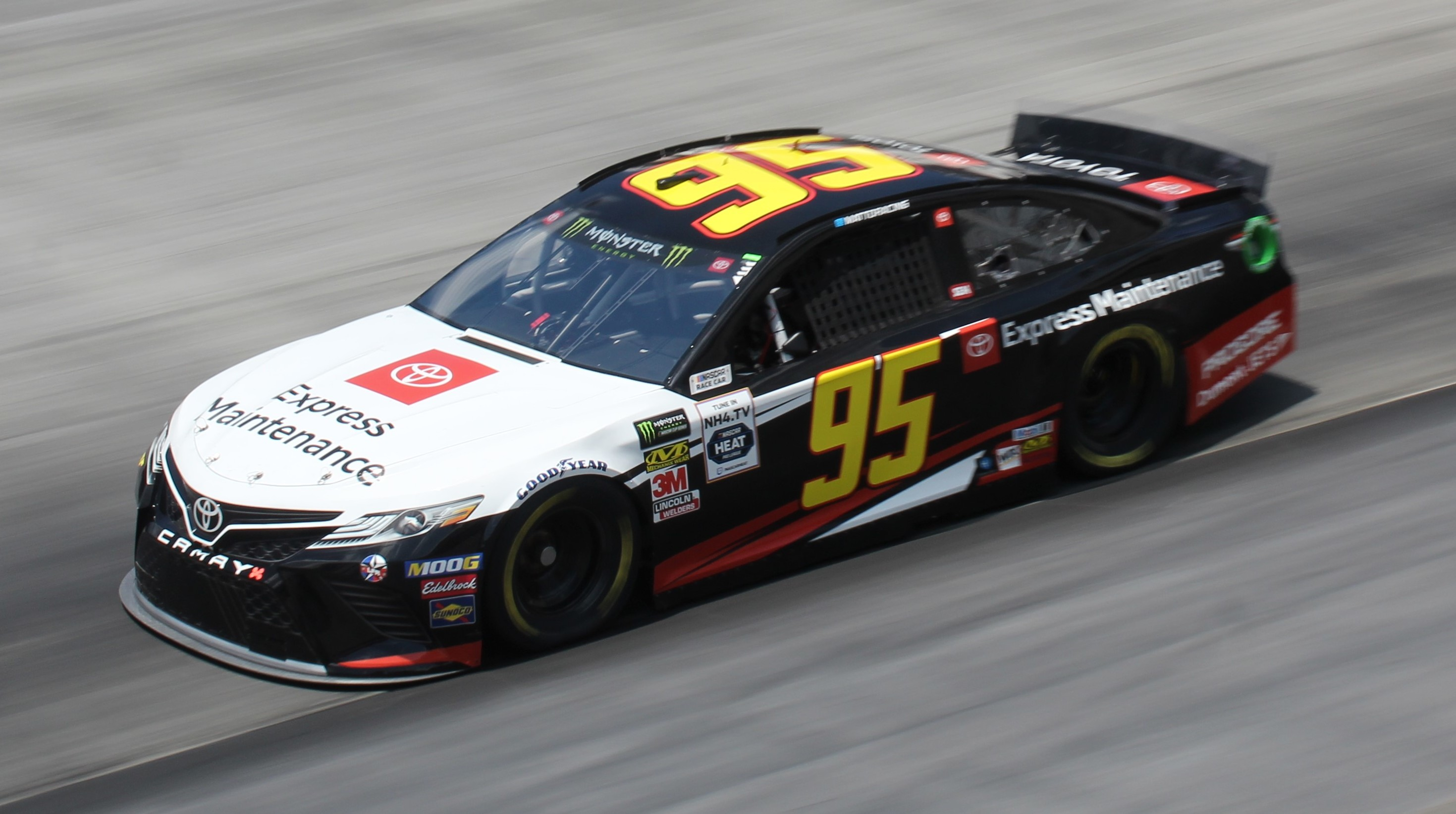
Matt DiBenedetto in the No. 95 during the 2019 Bass Pro Shops NRA Night Race

Matt DiBenedetto (2019)

On October 10, 2018, Matt DiBenedetto signed a two-year contract with Leavine Family Racing to drive the No. 95 starting in 2019. Also, Leavine Family Racing will switch from Chevrolet to Toyota while entering a technical alliance with Joe Gibbs Racing. At the 2019 Daytona 500, DiBenedetto led an impressive 49 laps before Paul Menard spun him from behind, triggering "The Big One" that claimed 21 cars and resulting in DiBenedetto finishing 28th. DiBenedetto scored a career-high fourth-place finish at Sonoma. DiBenedetto then scored four more top 10s in the summer months including an eighth at Daytona, a fifth at Loudon, a sixth at Watkins Glen, and a career-high second for both DiBenedetto and Leavine Family Racing at the Bristol Night Race.

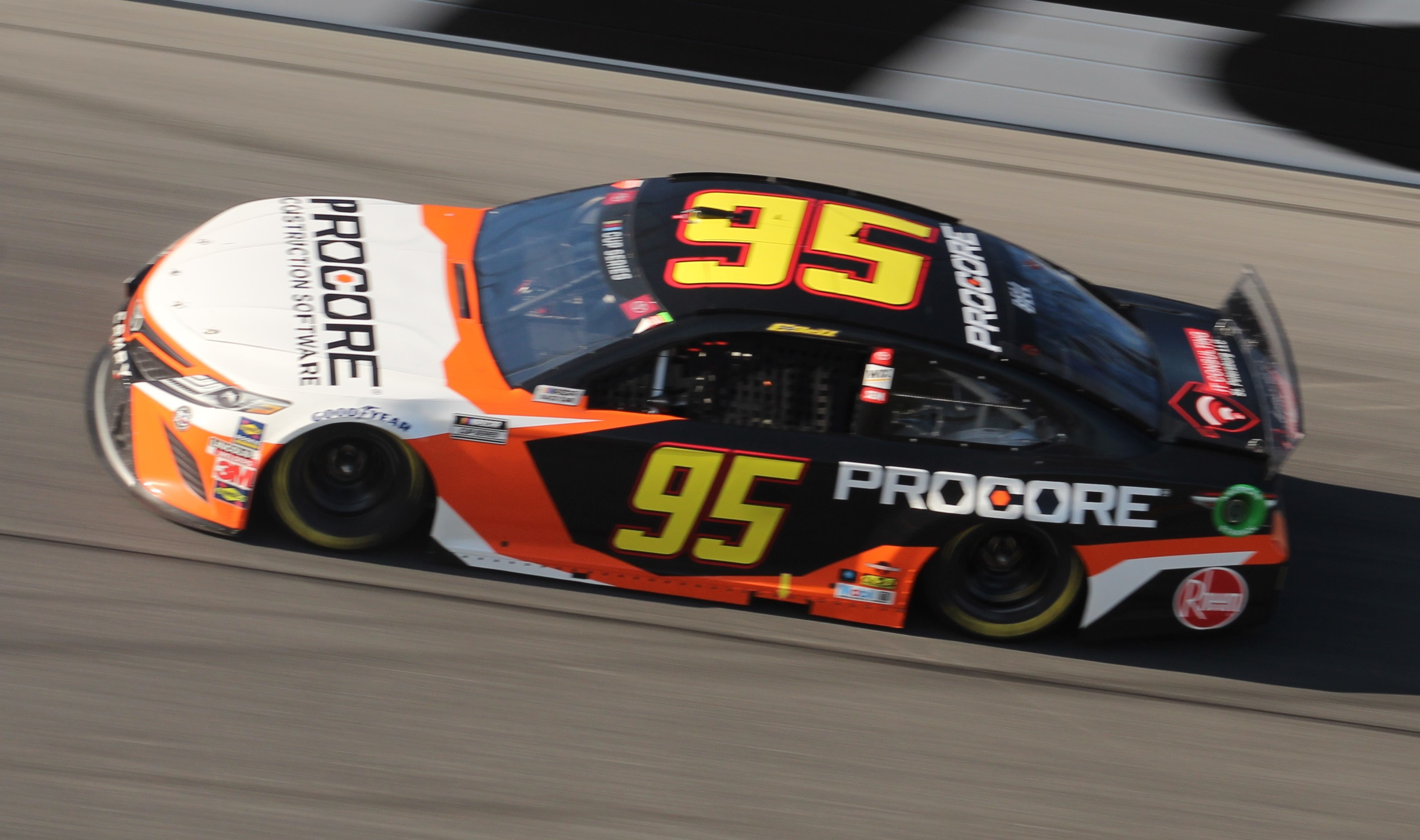
Bell's No. 95 Toyota at Daytona International Speedway in 2020

Christopher Bell (2020)

On September 24, 2019, Leavine Family Racing officially announced Christopher Bell as the new driver of the No. 95 for the 2020 season. Prior to the Las Vegas race, the team was docked 10 driver and owner points for an L1 level penalty during pre-race inspection. In LFR's final season, the No. 95 finished 20th in the points standings.

==== Car No. 95 results ====
Year	Driver	No.	Make	1	2	3	4	5	6	7	8	9	10	11	12	13	14	15	16	17	18	19	20	21	22	23	24	25	26	27	28	29	30	31	32	33	34	35	36	Owners	Pts
2011	David Starr	95	Ford	DAY	PHO	LVS	BRI	CAL	MAR	TEX; 38	TAL	RCH	DAR	DOV	CLT; 36	KAN	POC	MCH	SON	DAY	KEN; DNQ	NHA	IND	POC	GLN	MCH	BRI; 27	ATL; 29	RCH	CHI; DNQ	NHA	DOV	KAN; DNQ	CLT	TAL	MAR	TEX; DNQ	PHO	HOM	47th	47
2012	Scott Speed	95	Ford	DAY	PHO	LVS	BRI	CAL	MAR	TEX; 43	KAN	RCH; 43	TAL	DAR	CLT; 37	DOV	POC	MCH	SON; 25	KEN; 39	DAY	NHA	IND; 38	POC	GLN; 17	MCH	BRI; DNQ	ATL; 37	RCH	CHI; 41	NHA; 38	DOV; 40	TAL	CLT; 40	KAN; 34	MAR; 37	TEX; 30	PHO	HOM	43rd	121
2013	Scott Speed	95	Ford	DAY; 23	PHO; 41	LVS; 41	BRI; 40	CAL	MAR; 41	TEX; DNQ	KAN	RCH	TAL; 9	DAR; 41	CLT; 43	DOV	POC	MCH	SON	KEN	DAY; 28	NHA	IND; DNQ	POC	GLN	MCH; 41	BRI; 40	ATL; 43												44th	126
2013	Reed Sorenson	95	Ford																										RCH; 42	CHI; 42		DOV; 41	KAN; 42			MAR; 40	TEX	PHO; 37	HOM	44th	126
2013	Scott Riggs	95	Ford																												NHA; 43									44th	126
2013	Blake Koch	95	Ford																															CLT; 38	TAL					44th	126
2014	Michael McDowell	95	Ford	DAY; DNQ	PHO; 33	LVS; 43	BRI; 37	CAL	MAR; 37	TEX; 30	DAR	RCH; DNQ	TAL; 36	KAN	CLT; 30	DOV	POC	MCH	SON; 24	KEN	DAY; 7	NHA	IND; 26	POC	GLN; 42	MCH	BRI; 18	ATL; DNQ	RCH	CHI; 32	NHA	DOV	KAN; 35	CLT; 29	TAL; 41	MAR	TEX; 30	PHO; 31	HOM; 21	42nd	255
2015	Michael McDowell	95	Ford	DAY; 31	ATL; 27	LVS; 30	PHO	CAL	MAR	TEX; 31	BRI; 22	RCH	TAL; DNQ	KAN; 36	CLT; 30	DOV	POC	MCH	SON; 34	DAY; DNQ	KEN; DNQ	NHA	IND; 31	POC	GLN; 20	MCH	BRI; 31	DAR	RCH; 42	CHI; DNQ	NHA	DOV	CLT; 31	KAN	TAL; 28	MAR	TEX; 34	PHO	HOM; 33	44th	213
2016	Ty Dillon	95	Chevy	DAY; 25						TEX; 20							POC; 21	MCH; 24			KEN; 25											DOV; 32							HOM; 33	30th	552
2016	Michael McDowell	95	Chevy		ATL; 33	LVS; 29	PHO; 26	CAL; 31	MAR; 24		BRI; 29	RCH; 31	TAL; 21	KAN; 28	DOV; 20	CLT; 34			SON; 39	DAY; 10		NHA; 39	IND; 23	POC; 23	GLN; 17	BRI; 19	MCH; 31	DAR; 27	RCH; 12	CHI; 37	NHA; 26		CLT; 14	KAN; 22	TAL; 16	MAR; 18	TEX; 23	PHO; 34		30th	552
2017	Michael McDowell	95	Chevy	DAY; 15	ATL; 29	LVS; 18	PHO; 24	CAL; 33	MAR; 26	TEX; 23	BRI; 26	RCH; 29	TAL; 34	KAN; 13	CLT; 19	DOV; 19	POC; 24	MCH; 23	SON; 14	DAY; 4	KEN; 23	NHA; 26	IND; 18	POC; 18	GLN; 12	MCH; 27	BRI; 20	DAR; 19	RCH; 16	CHI; 30	NHA; 23	DOV; 27	CLT; 35	TAL; 30	KAN; 18	MAR; 19	TEX; 21	PHO; 22	HOM; 24	27th	542
2018	Kasey Kahne	95	Chevy	DAY; 34	ATL; 21	LVS; 19	PHO; 24	CAL; 24	MAR; 24	TEX; 17	BRI; 34	RCH; 29	TAL; 17	DOV; 17	KAN; 21	CLT; 20	POC; 36	MCH; 23	SON; 20	CHI; 27	DAY; 4	KEN; 25	NHA; 19	POC; 30	GLN; 21	MCH; 26	BRI; 15	DAR; 24												27th	515
2018	Regan Smith	95	Chevy																										IND; 20	LVS; 12	RCH; 31	CLT; 15	DOV; 21	TAL; 10	KAN; 28	MAR; 28	TEX; 27	PHO; 22	HOM; 39	27th	515
2019	Matt DiBenedetto	95	Toyota	DAY; 28*	ATL; 26	LVS; 21	PHO; 28	CAL; 18	MAR; 20	TEX; 26	BRI; 12	RCH; 24	TAL; 31	DOV; 20	KAN; 36	CLT; 39	POC; 17	MCH; 21	SON; 4	CHI; 27	DAY; 8	KEN; 16	NHA; 5	POC; 17	GLN; 6	MCH; 20	BRI; 2*	DAR; 8	IND; 18	LVS; 21	RCH; 14	CLT; 11	DOV; 7	TAL; 30	KAN; 15	MAR; 16	TEX; 14	PHO; 13	HOM; 20	22nd	699
2020	Christopher Bell	95	Toyota	DAY; 21	LVS; 33	CAL; 38	PHO; 24	DAR; 24	DAR; 11	CLT; 9	CLT; 21	BRI; 9	ATL; 18	MAR; 28	HOM; 8	TAL; 29	POC; 4	POC; 39	IND; 12	KEN; 7	TEX; 21	KAN; 23	NHA; 28	MCH; 13	MCH; 17	DAY; 21	DOV; 22	DOV; 27	DAY; 13	DAR; 34	RCH; 15	BRI; 28	LVS; 24	TAL; 39	CLT; 24	KAN; 10	TEX; 3	MAR; 15	PHO; 17	20th	678

=== Car No. 59 history ===
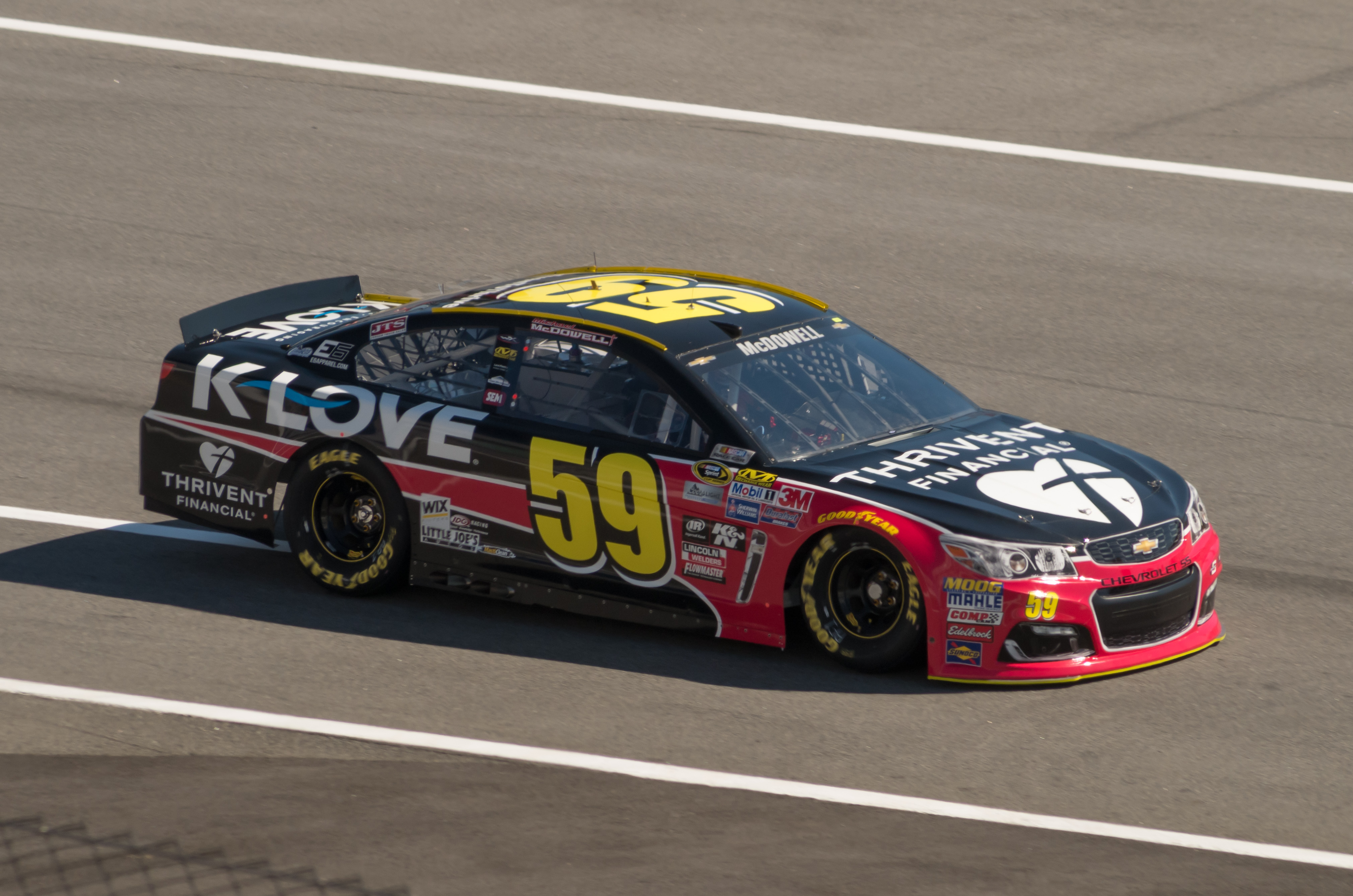
Michael McDowell in the No. 59 at Daytona International Speedway in 2016.

In 2016, Circle Sport - Leavine Family Racing, as part of the Circle Sport merger, agreed to have Ty Dillon drive the No. 95 for the 2016 Daytona 500. Michael McDowell would attempt the race in a second entry, the No. 59 Thrivent Financial / K-Love Chevy. McDowell qualified the 500 by finishing 14th in his Can-Am Duel race. McDowell had a commendable finish in the car during the Daytona 500, finishing 15th. This was the only start in 2016 for the No. 59 other than the season finale at Homestead. Before the weekend, the team acquired a charter from the No. 7 team of Tommy Baldwin Racing, which guaranteed the No. 59 a spot in the race. The car finished 10th in the race, after avoiding a big crash that took out the teammate's No. 95 car with just a few laps left in the race.

==== Car No. 59 results ====
Year	Driver	No.	Make	1	2	3	4	5	6	7	8	9	10	11	12	13	14	15	16	17	18	19	20	21	22	23	24	25	26	27	28	29	30	31	32	33	34	35	36	Owners	Pts
2016	Michael McDowell	59	Chevy	DAY; 15	ATL	LVS	PHO	CAL	MAR	TEX	BRI	RCH	TAL	KAN	DOV	CLT	POC	MCH	SON	DAY	KEN	NHA	IND	POC	GLN	BRI	MCH	DAR	RCH	CHI	NHA	DOV	CLT	KAN	TAL	MAR	TEX	PHO	HOM; 10	32nd^{1}	494^{1}

- Acquired the owner points of Tommy Baldwin Racing's No. 7 car before the race at Homestead.

== Nationwide Series ==
=== Car No. 95 history ===
In October 2013, Leavine Family Racing announced that they would be adding a Nationwide Series team to the team's operations, with the No. 95 Ford Mustang being driven by Reed Sorenson in selected races late in the 2013 season, with a full-time driver for the 2014 season to be announced. However, plans for 2014 never came to fruition.

==== Car No. 95 results ====
Year	Driver	No.	Make	1	2	3	4	5	6	7	8	9	10	11	12	13	14	15	16	17	18	19	20	21	22	23	24	25	26	27	28	29	30	31	32	33	Owners	Pts
2013	Reed Sorenson	95	Ford	DAY	PHO	LVS	BRI	CAL	TEX	RCH	TAL	DAR	CLT	DOV	IOW	MCH	ROA	KEN	DAY	NHA	CHI	IND	IOW	GLN	MOH	BRI	ATL	RCH	CHI	KEN	DOV	KAN	CLT; 37	TEX	PHO	HOM	65th	7

== ARCA Racing Series ==
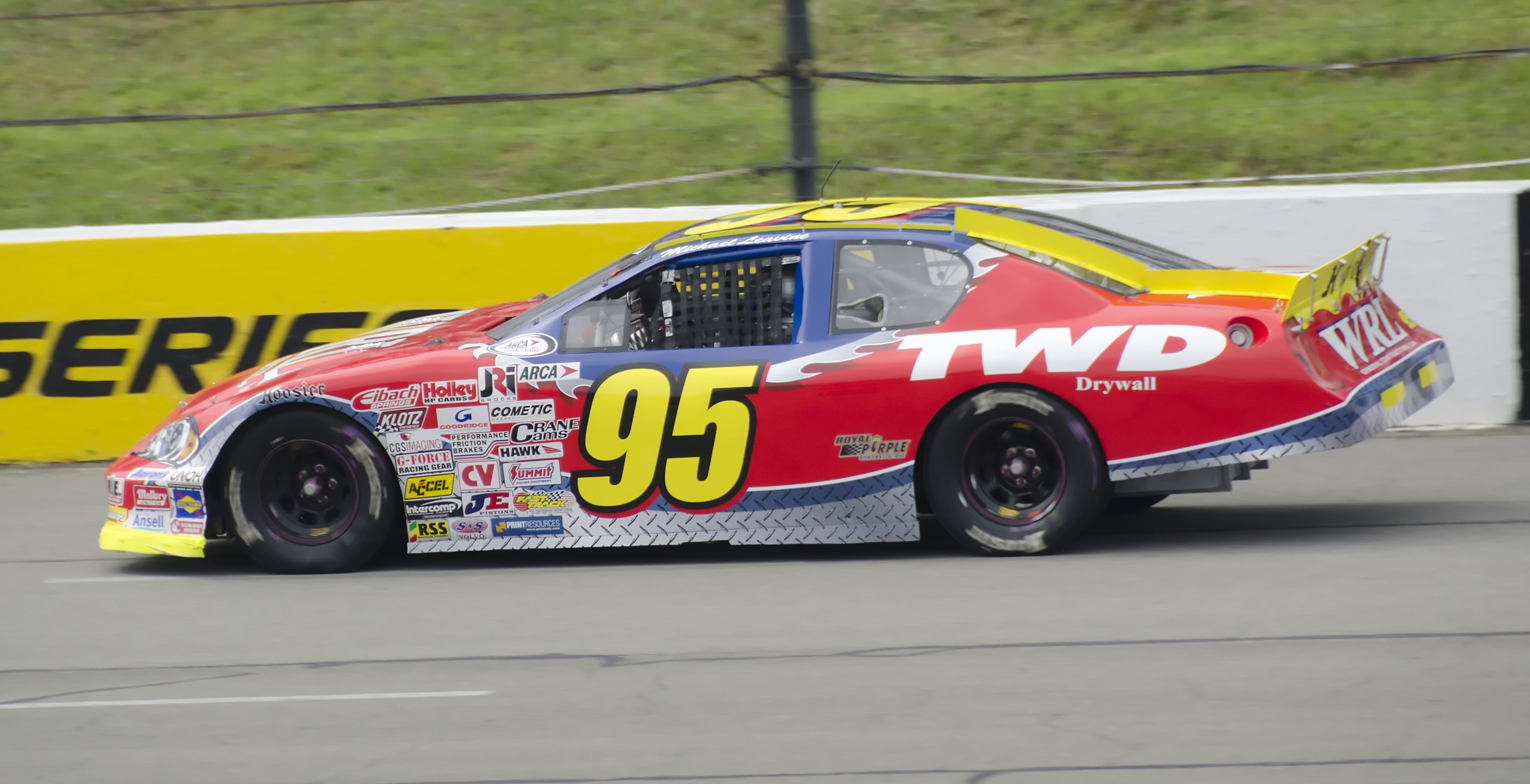
Michael Leavine at Pocono Raceway in 2011

=== Car No. 95 history ===
For the 2012 season, Leavine Family Racing added an ARCA Racing Series team to its racing efforts, with Michael Leavine, grandson of the team's owners, racing as a development driver. A six-race schedule was planned for Leavine in the series for 2012; In his first two races of the 2012 season, Leavine crashed in both, with a best finish of 26th at Pocono Raceway; he withdrew following practice at his third attempted race at Michigan International Speedway.

==== Car No. 95 results ====
Year	Driver	No.	Make	1	2	3	4	5	6	7	8	9	10	11	12	13	14	15	16	17	18	19	Owners	Pts
2011	Michael Leavine	03	Chevy	DAY	TAL	SLM	TOL	NJ	CHI	POC	MCH	WIN	BLN	IOW; 20	IRP								33rd	880
2011	Michael Leavine	95	Chevy													POC; 28	ISF	MAD	DSF	SLM	KAN; 26	TOL	33rd	880
2012	Michael Leavine	95	Ford	DAY	MOB; 31	SLM	TAL	TOL	ELK	POC; 26	MCH; Wth	WIN	NJE	IOW; 15	CHI; 14	IRP; 15	POC; 31	BLN	ISF	MAD	SLM	KAN; 17	73rd	75
