= 2020 Auto Club 400 =

NASCAR Cup Series race

Race details
- Race 3 of 36 in the 2020 NASCAR Cup Series
- 2020 Auto Club 400 program cover featuring a tribute to Jimmie Johnson, who retired at the end of this season.
- Date: March 1, 2020
- Location: Auto Club Speedway in Fontana, California
- Course: Permanent racing facility
- Course length: 3.22 km (2 miles)
- Distance: 200 laps, 400 mi (640 km)
- Average speed: 152.753 miles per hour (245.832 km/h)

Pole position
Driver	Clint Bowyer	Stewart-Haas Racing
- Time: 40.086

Most laps led
Driver	Alex Bowman	Hendrick Motorsports
- Laps: 110

Winner
No. 88	Alex Bowman	Hendrick Motorsports

Television in the United States
- Network: Fox
- Announcers: Mike Joy and Jeff Gordon
- Nielsen ratings: 4.789 million

Radio in the United States
- Radio: MRN
- Booth announcers: Alex Hayden, Jeff Striegle, and Rusty Wallace
- Turn announcers: Dan Hubbard (1 & 2) and Kurt Becker (3 & 4)

The 2020 Auto Club 400 was a NASCAR Cup Series race held on March 1, 2020, at Auto Club Speedway in Fontana, California. Contested over 200 laps on the two-mile (3.2 km) D-shaped oval, it was the third race of the 2020 NASCAR Cup Series season.

== Report ==
=== Background ===
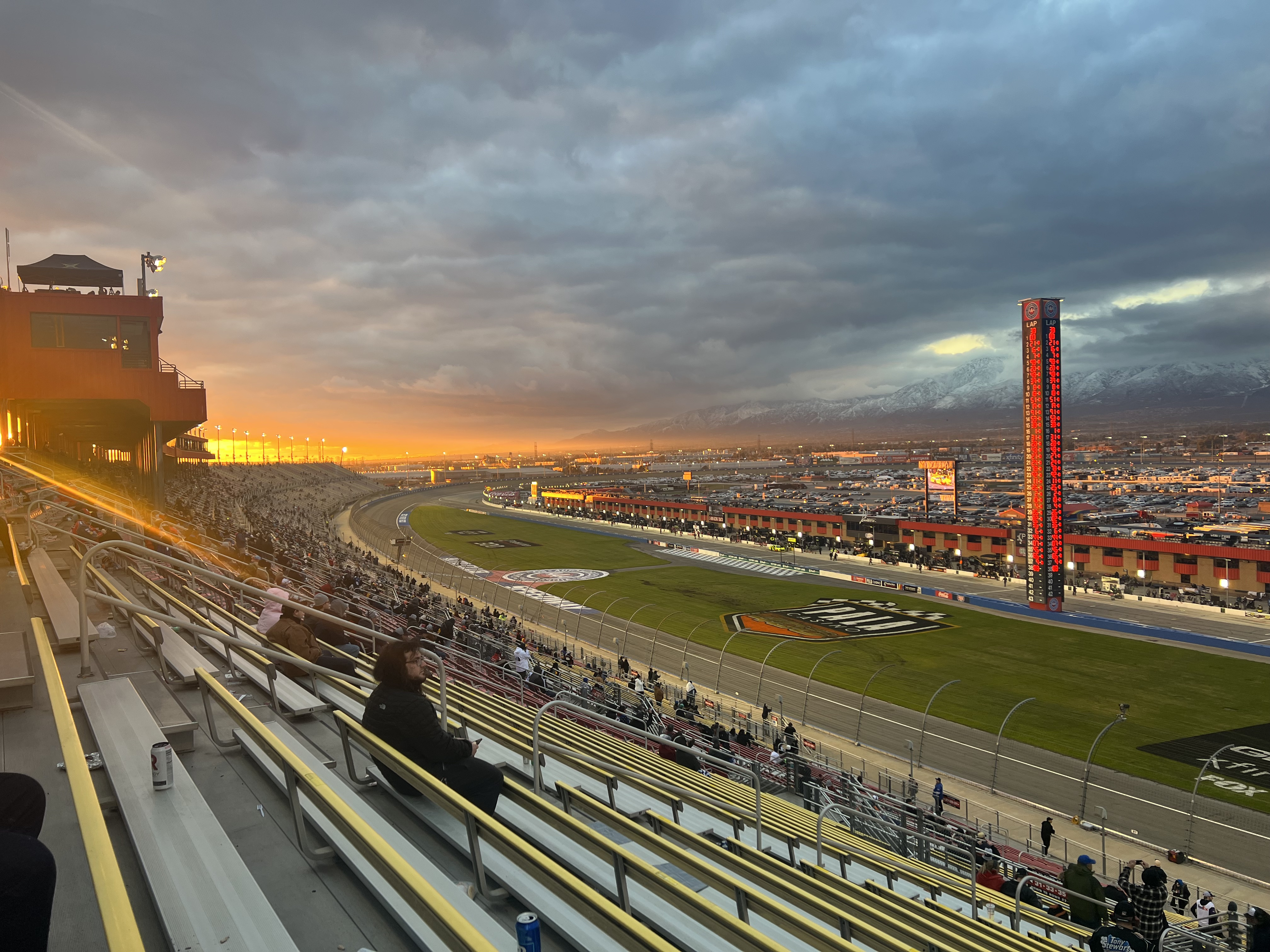
Auto Club Speedway, the track where the race was held.

Auto Club Speedway (previously California Speedway) was a two-mile (3.2 km), low-banked, D-shaped oval superspeedway in Fontana, California which hosted NASCAR racing annually from 1997 to 2023. It was also used for open wheel racing events. The racetrack was located near the former locations of Ontario Motor Speedway and Riverside International Raceway. The track was owned and operated by International Speedway Corporation and was the only track owned by ISC to have its naming rights sold. The speedway was served by the nearby Interstate 10 and Interstate 15 freeways as well as a Metrolink station located behind the backstretch.

==== Entry list ====
- (R) denotes rookie driver.
- (i) denotes driver who are ineligible for series driver points.

No.	Driver	Team	Manufacturer
00	Quin Houff (R)	StarCom Racing	Chevrolet
1	Kurt Busch	Chip Ganassi Racing	Chevrolet
2	Brad Keselowski	Team Penske	Ford
3	Austin Dillon	Richard Childress Racing	Chevrolet
4	Kevin Harvick	Stewart-Haas Racing	Ford
6	Ross Chastain (i)	Roush Fenway Racing	Ford
8	Tyler Reddick (R)	Richard Childress Racing	Chevrolet
9	Chase Elliott	Hendrick Motorsports	Chevrolet
10	Aric Almirola	Stewart-Haas Racing	Ford
11	Denny Hamlin	Joe Gibbs Racing	Toyota
12	Ryan Blaney	Team Penske	Ford
13	Ty Dillon	Germain Racing	Chevrolet
14	Clint Bowyer	Stewart-Haas Racing	Ford
15	Brennan Poole (R)	Premium Motorsports	Chevrolet
17	Chris Buescher	Roush Fenway Racing	Ford
18	Kyle Busch	Joe Gibbs Racing	Toyota
19	Martin Truex Jr.	Joe Gibbs Racing	Toyota
20	Erik Jones	Joe Gibbs Racing	Toyota
21	Matt DiBenedetto	Wood Brothers Racing	Ford
22	Joey Logano	Team Penske	Ford
24	William Byron	Hendrick Motorsports	Chevrolet
32	Corey LaJoie	Go Fas Racing	Ford
34	Michael McDowell	Front Row Motorsports	Ford
37	Ryan Preece	JTG Daugherty Racing	Chevrolet
38	John Hunter Nemechek (R)	Front Row Motorsports	Ford
41	Cole Custer (R)	Stewart-Haas Racing	Ford
42	Kyle Larson	Chip Ganassi Racing	Chevrolet
43	Bubba Wallace	Richard Petty Motorsports	Chevrolet
47	Ricky Stenhouse Jr.	JTG Daugherty Racing	Chevrolet
48	Jimmie Johnson	Hendrick Motorsports	Chevrolet
51	Garrett Smithley	Petty Ware Racing	Chevrolet
52	J. J. Yeley (i)	Rick Ware Racing	Ford
53	Joey Gase (i)	Rick Ware Racing	Ford
66	Timmy Hill (i)	MBM Motorsports	Toyota
77	Reed Sorenson	Spire Motorsports	Chevrolet
88	Alex Bowman	Hendrick Motorsports	Chevrolet
95	Christopher Bell (R)	Leavine Family Racing	Toyota
96	Daniel Suárez	Gaunt Brothers Racing	Toyota
Official entry list

== Practice ==
=== First practice ===
Alex Bowman was the fastest in the first practice session with a time of 40.125 seconds and a speed of 179.439 mph (288.779 km/h).

Pos	No.	Driver	Team	Manufacturer	Time	Speed
1	88	Alex Bowman	Hendrick Motorsports	Chevrolet	40.125	179.439
2	42	Kyle Larson	Chip Ganassi Racing	Chevrolet	40.517	177.703
3	8	Tyler Reddick (R)	Richard Childress Racing	Chevrolet	40.539	177.607
Official first practice results

=== Final practice ===
Alex Bowman was the fastest in the final practice session with a time of 40.764 seconds and a speed of 176.626 mph (284.252 km/h).

Pos	No.	Driver	Team	Manufacturer	Time	Speed
1	88	Alex Bowman	Hendrick Motorsports	Chevrolet	40.764	176.626
2	12	Ryan Blaney	Team Penske	Ford	40.866	176.186
3	43	Bubba Wallace	Richard Petty Motorsports	Chevrolet	40.868	176.177
Official final practice results

== Qualifying ==
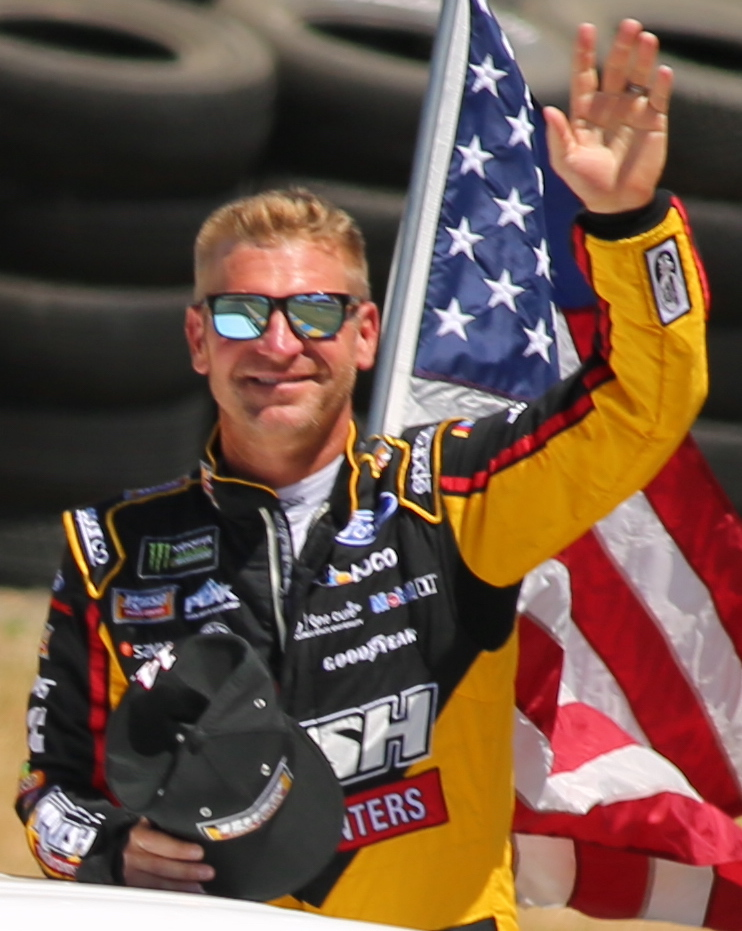
Clint Bowyer scored the pole position.

Clint Bowyer scored the pole for the race with a time of 40.086 and a speed of 179.614 mph (289.061 km/h).

=== Qualifying results ===
Pos	No.	Driver	Team	Manufacturer	Time
1	14	Clint Bowyer	Stewart-Haas Racing	Ford	40.086
2	48	Jimmie Johnson	Hendrick Motorsports	Chevrolet	40.093
3	88	Alex Bowman	Hendrick Motorsports	Chevrolet	40.143
4	1	Kurt Busch	Chip Ganassi Racing	Chevrolet	40.233
5	4	Kevin Harvick	Stewart-Haas Racing	Ford	40.250
6	10	Aric Almirola	Stewart-Haas Racing	Ford	40.280
7	22	Joey Logano	Team Penske	Ford	40.284
8	34	Michael McDowell	Front Row Motorsports	Ford	40.304
9	42	Kyle Larson	Chip Ganassi Racing	Chevrolet	40.341
10	47	Ricky Stenhouse Jr.	JTG Daugherty Racing	Chevrolet	40.351
11	17	Chris Buescher	Roush Fenway Racing	Ford	40.367
12	21	Matt DiBenedetto	Wood Brothers Racing	Ford	40.428
13	9	Chase Elliott	Hendrick Motorsports	Chevrolet	40.485
14	43	Bubba Wallace	Richard Petty Motorsports	Chevrolet	40.487
15	2	Brad Keselowski	Team Penske	Ford	40.491
16	12	Ryan Blaney	Team Penske	Ford	40.503
17	18	Kyle Busch	Joe Gibbs Racing	Toyota	40.516
18	41	Cole Custer (R)	Stewart-Haas Racing	Ford	40.519
19	8	Tyler Reddick (R)	Richard Childress Racing	Chevrolet	40.583
20	37	Ryan Preece	JTG Daugherty Racing	Chevrolet	40.587
21	24	William Byron	Hendrick Motorsports	Chevrolet	40.610
22	95	Christopher Bell (R)	Leavine Family Racing	Toyota	40.698
23	38	John Hunter Nemechek (R)	Front Row Motorsports	Ford	40.699
24	13	Ty Dillon	Germain Racing	Chevrolet	40.738
25	3	Austin Dillon	Richard Childress Racing	Chevrolet	40.750
26	32	Corey LaJoie	Go Fas Racing	Ford	40.761
27	6	Ross Chastain (i)	Roush Fenway Racing	Ford	40.783
28	11	Denny Hamlin	Joe Gibbs Racing	Toyota	40.790
29	20	Erik Jones	Joe Gibbs Racing	Toyota	40.955
30	52	J. J. Yeley (i)	Rick Ware Racing	Ford	41.484
31	96	Daniel Suárez	Gaunt Brothers Racing	Toyota	41.511
32	15	Brennan Poole (R)	Premium Motorsports	Chevrolet	41.819
33	77	Reed Sorenson	Spire Motorsports	Chevrolet	41.975
34	53	Joey Gase (i)	Rick Ware Racing	Ford	42.375
35	00	Quin Houff (R)	StarCom Racing	Chevrolet	42.657
36	51	Garrett Smithley	Rick Ware Racing	Chevrolet	42.842
37	66	Timmy Hill (i)	MBM Motorsports	Toyota	43.729
38	19	Martin Truex Jr.	Joe Gibbs Racing	Toyota	0.000
Official qualifying results

== Race ==
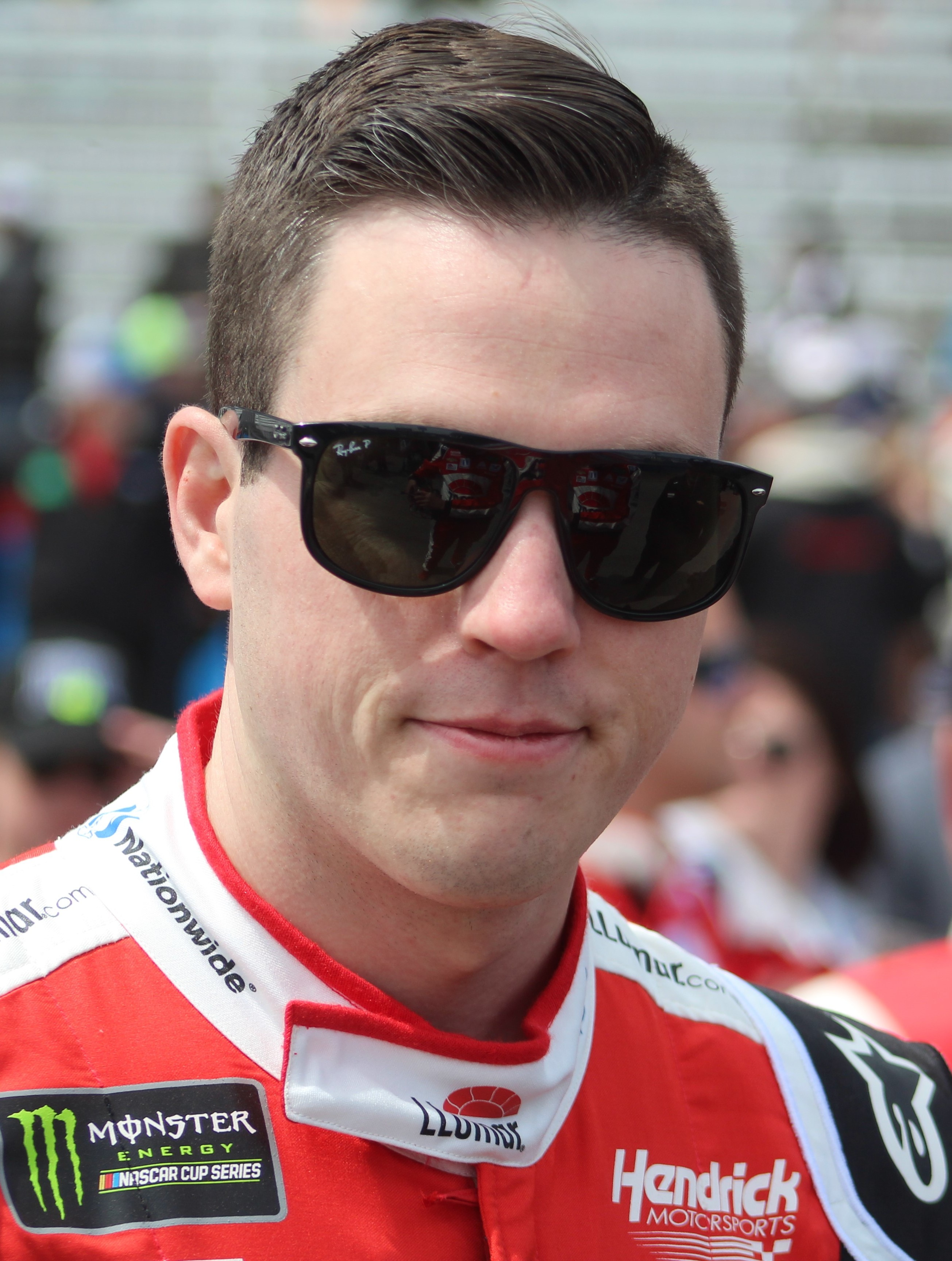
Alex Bowman won the race.

=== Stage Results ===
Stage One Laps: 60

Pos	No	Driver	Team	Manufacturer	Points
1	88	Alex Bowman	Hendrick Motorsports	Chevrolet	10
2	12	Ryan Blaney	Team Penske	Ford	9
3	48	Jimmie Johnson	Hendrick Motorsports	Chevrolet	8
4	10	Aric Almirola	Stewart-Haas Racing	Ford	7
5	1	Kurt Busch	Chip Ganassi Racing	Chevrolet	6
6	2	Brad Keselowski	Team Penske	Ford	5
7	22	Joey Logano	Team Penske	Ford	4
8	21	Matt DiBenedetto	Wood Brothers Racing	Ford	3
9	9	Chase Elliott	Hendrick Motorsports	Chevrolet	2
10	18	Kyle Busch	Joe Gibbs Racing	Toyota	1
Official stage one results

Stage Two Laps: 60

Pos	No	Driver	Team	Manufacturer	Points
1	12	Ryan Blaney	Team Penske	Ford	10
2	88	Alex Bowman	Hendrick Motorsports	Chevrolet	9
3	48	Jimmie Johnson	Hendrick Motorsports	Chevrolet	8
4	2	Brad Keselowski	Team Penske	Ford	7
5	19	Martin Truex Jr.	Joe Gibbs Racing	Toyota	6
6	9	Chase Elliott	Hendrick Motorsports	Chevrolet	5
7	18	Kyle Busch	Joe Gibbs Racing	Toyota	4
8	11	Denny Hamlin	Joe Gibbs Racing	Toyota	3
9	20	Erik Jones	Joe Gibbs Racing	Toyota	2
10	4	Kevin Harvick	Stewart-Haas Racing	Ford	1
Official stage two results

=== Final Stage Results ===
Stage Three Laps: 80

Pos	Grid	No	Driver	Team	Manufacturer	Laps	Points
1	3	88	Alex Bowman	Hendrick Motorsports	Chevrolet	200	59
2	17	18	Kyle Busch	Joe Gibbs Racing	Toyota	200	40
3	4	1	Kurt Busch	Chip Ganassi Racing	Chevrolet	200	40
4	13	9	Chase Elliott	Hendrick Motorsports	Chevrolet	200	40
5	15	2	Brad Keselowski	Team Penske	Ford	200	44
6	28	11	Denny Hamlin	Joe Gibbs Racing	Toyota	200	34
7	2	48	Jimmie Johnson	Hendrick Motorsports	Chevrolet	200	46
8	6	10	Aric Almirola	Stewart-Haas Racing	Ford	200	36
9	5	4	Kevin Harvick	Stewart-Haas Racing	Ford	200	29
10	29	20	Erik Jones	Joe Gibbs Racing	Toyota	200	29
11	19	8	Tyler Reddick (R)	Richard Childress Racing	Chevrolet	200	26
12	7	22	Joey Logano	Team Penske	Ford	200	29
13	12	21	Matt DiBenedetto	Wood Brothers Racing	Ford	200	27
14	38	19	Martin Truex Jr.	Joe Gibbs Racing	Toyota	200	29
15	21	24	William Byron	Hendrick Motorsports	Chevrolet	200	22
16	11	17	Chris Buescher	Roush Fenway Racing	Ford	200	21
17	27	6	Ross Chastain (i)	Roush Fenway Racing	Ford	200	0
18	18	41	Cole Custer (R)	Stewart-Haas Racing	Ford	199	19
19	16	12	Ryan Blaney	Team Penske	Ford	199	37
20	10	47	Ricky Stenhouse Jr.	JTG Daugherty Racing	Chevrolet	199	17
21	9	42	Kyle Larson	Chip Ganassi Racing	Chevrolet	199	16
22	8	34	Michael McDowell	Front Row Motorsports	Ford	199	15
23	1	14	Clint Bowyer	Stewart-Haas Racing	Ford	199	14
24	25	3	Austin Dillon	Richard Childress Racing	Chevrolet	199	13
25	23	38	John Hunter Nemechek (R)	Front Row Motorsports	Ford	199	12
26	24	13	Ty Dillon	Germain Racing	Chevrolet	199	11
27	14	43	Bubba Wallace	Richard Petty Motorsports	Chevrolet	198	10
28	31	96	Daniel Suárez	Gaunt Brothers Racing	Toyota	198	9
29	26	32	Corey LaJoie	Go Fas Racing	Ford	197	8
30	20	37	Ryan Preece	JTG Daugherty Racing	Chevrolet	197	7
31	30	52	J. J. Yeley (i)	Rick Ware Racing	Ford	197	0
32	32	15	Brennan Poole (R)	Premium Motorsports	Chevrolet	195	5
33	34	53	Joey Gase (i)	Rick Ware Racing	Ford	193	0
34	36	51	Garrett Smithley	Petty Ware Racing	Chevrolet	193	3
35	35	00	Quin Houff (R)	StarCom Racing	Chevrolet	192	2
36	33	77	Reed Sorenson	Spire Motorsports	Chevrolet	191	1
37	37	66	Timmy Hill (i)	MBM Motorsports	Toyota	184	0
38	22	95	Christopher Bell (R)	Leavine Family Racing	Toyota	80	1
Official race results

=== Race statistics ===
- Lead changes: 16 among 8 different drivers
- Cautions/Laps: 3 for 13
- Red flags: 0
- Time of race: 2 hours, 37 minutes and 7 seconds
- Average speed: 152.753 miles per hour (245.832 km/h)

== Media ==
=== Television ===
The race was the 20th race Fox Sports covered at the Auto Club Speedway. Mike Joy and three-time Auto Club winner Jeff Gordon called the race in the booth for Fox. Jamie Little, Regan Smith, Vince Welch and Matt Yocum handled the pit road duties for the television side. Larry McReynolds and Jamie McMurray provided insight from the Fox Sports studio in Charlotte.

Fox
Booth announcers	Pit reporters	In-race analysts
Lap-by-lap: Mike Joy; Color-commentator: Jeff Gordon	Jamie Little; Regan Smith; Vince Welch; Matt Yocum	Larry McReynolds; Jamie McMurray

=== Radio ===
MRN had the radio call for the race, which was also simulcast on Sirius XM NASCAR Radio. Alex Hayden, Jeff Striegle and 2001 race winner Rusty Wallace called the race from the booth when the field raced their way down the front stretch. Dan Hubbard called the race from a billboard outside turn 2 when the field raced their way through turns 1 and 2 & Kyle Rickey called the race from a billboard outside turn 3 when the field raced their way through turns 3 and 4. Kim Coon, Steve Post and Dillon Welch had the pit road duties for MRN.

MRN
Booth announcers	Turn announcers	Pit reporters
Lead announcer: Alex Hayden; Announcer: Jeff Striegle; Announcer: Rusty Wallace	Turns 1 & 2: Dan Hubbard; Turns 3 & 4: Kyle Rickey	Kim Coon; Steve Post; Dillon Welch

== Standings after the race ==
Drivers' Championship standings

	Pos	Driver	Points
	1	Ryan Blaney	122
	2	Joey Logano	111 (–11)
11	3	Alex Bowman	110 (–12)
1	4	Kevin Harvick	110 (–12)
6	5	Jimmie Johnson	106 (–16)
	6	Chase Elliott	105 (–17)
2	7	Denny Hamlin	94 (–28)
2	8	Matt DiBenedetto	87 (–35)
5	9	Kyle Larson	86 (–36)
7	10	Aric Almirola	84 (–38)
3	11	Chris Buescher	82 (–40)
7	12	Brad Keselowski	82 (–40)
3	13	Martin Truex Jr.	79 (–43)
7	14	Austin Dillon	76 (–46)
10	15	Ricky Stenhouse Jr.	73 (–49)
3	16	Clint Bowyer	70 (–52)
Official driver's standings

Manufacturers' Championship standings

Pos	Manufacturer	Points
1	Ford	107
2	Chevrolet	104 (–3)
3	Toyota	97 (–10)

- Note: Only the first 16 positions are included for the driver standings.

Previous race: 2020 Pennzoil 400	NASCAR Cup Series; 2020 season	Next race: 2020 FanShield 500
