= 2016 Pure Michigan 400 =

24th race of 2016 NASCAR Sprint Cup series

Race details
- Race 24 of 36 in the 2016 NASCAR Sprint Cup Series
- The 2016 Pure Michigan 400 program cover, featuring Matt Kenseth.
- Date: August 28, 2016
- Location: Michigan International Speedway in Brooklyn, Michigan
- Course: Permanent racing facility
- Course length: 2 miles (3.2 km)
- Distance: 200 laps, 400 mi (640 km)
- Average speed: 162.730 mph (261.889 km/h)

Pole position
Driver	Joey Logano	Team Penske
- Time: 35.697

Most laps led
Driver	Kyle Larson	Chip Ganassi Racing
- Laps: 41

Winner
No. 42	Kyle Larson	Chip Ganassi Racing

Television in the United States
- Network: NBCSN
- Announcers: Rick Allen, Jeff Burton and Steve Letarte
- Nielsen ratings: 1.9/3 (Overnight); 2.1/4 (Final); 3.4 million viewers

Radio in the United States
- Radio: MRN
- Booth announcers: Kurt Becker and Jeff Striegle
- Turn announcers: Dave Moody (1 & 2) and Alex Hayden (3 & 4)

The 2016 Pure Michigan 400 was a NASCAR Sprint Cup Series stock car race held on August 28, 2016, at Michigan International Speedway in Brooklyn, Michigan. Contested over 200 laps on the two-mile (3.2 km) D-shaped oval, it was the 24th race of the 2016 NASCAR Sprint Cup Series season.

Kyle Larson won his first career Cup Series race, the race had thirteen lead changes among different drivers and four cautions for 17 laps.

== Report ==
=== Aero package ===
NASCAR announced in late July that the modified aerodynamic package used at Michigan in June and Kentucky in July was used one more time this past weekend at Michigan. In addition to the aero changes used in the 2016 NASCAR Sprint All-Star Race, there was a reduction in spoiler size from 3.5 to 2.5 in (8.9 to 6.4 cm), a two-inch (5.1 cm) reduction of the splitter and resizing the deck fin.

=== Entry list ===
The preliminary entry list for the race included 40 cars and was released on August 22, 2016, at 3:36 p.m. Eastern time. Alex Bowman drove in place of Dale Earnhardt Jr. this weekend as he recovers from a concussion.

No.	Driver	Team	Manufacturer
1	Jamie McMurray	Chip Ganassi Racing	Chevrolet
2	Brad Keselowski	Team Penske	Ford
3	Austin Dillon	Richard Childress Racing	Chevrolet
4	Kevin Harvick	Stewart–Haas Racing	Chevrolet
5	Kasey Kahne	Hendrick Motorsports	Chevrolet
6	Trevor Bayne	Roush Fenway Racing	Ford
7	Regan Smith	Tommy Baldwin Racing	Chevrolet
10	Danica Patrick	Stewart–Haas Racing	Chevrolet
11	Denny Hamlin	Joe Gibbs Racing	Toyota
13	Casey Mears	Germain Racing	Chevrolet
14	Tony Stewart	Stewart–Haas Racing	Chevrolet
15	Clint Bowyer	HScott Motorsports	Chevrolet
16	Greg Biffle	Roush Fenway Racing	Ford
17	Ricky Stenhouse Jr.	Roush Fenway Racing	Ford
18	Kyle Busch	Joe Gibbs Racing	Toyota
19	Carl Edwards	Joe Gibbs Racing	Toyota
20	Matt Kenseth	Joe Gibbs Racing	Toyota
21	Ryan Blaney (R)	Wood Brothers Racing	Ford
22	Joey Logano	Team Penske	Ford
23	David Ragan	BK Racing	Toyota
24	Chase Elliott (R)	Hendrick Motorsports	Chevrolet
27	Paul Menard	Richard Childress Racing	Chevrolet
30	Josh Wise	The Motorsports Group	Chevrolet
31	Ryan Newman	Richard Childress Racing	Chevrolet
32	Jeffrey Earnhardt (R)	Go FAS Racing	Ford
34	Chris Buescher (R)	Front Row Motorsports	Ford
38	Landon Cassill	Front Row Motorsports	Ford
41	Kurt Busch	Stewart–Haas Racing	Chevrolet
42	Kyle Larson	Chip Ganassi Racing	Chevrolet
43	Aric Almirola	Richard Petty Motorsports	Ford
44	Brian Scott (R)	Richard Petty Motorsports	Ford
46	Michael Annett	HScott Motorsports	Chevrolet
47	A. J. Allmendinger	JTG Daugherty Racing	Chevrolet
48	Jimmie Johnson	Hendrick Motorsports	Chevrolet
55	Reed Sorenson	Premium Motorsports	Chevrolet
78	Martin Truex Jr.	Furniture Row Racing	Toyota
83	Matt DiBenedetto	BK Racing	Toyota
88	Alex Bowman (i)	Hendrick Motorsports	Chevrolet
95	Michael McDowell	Circle Sport – Leavine Family Racing	Chevrolet
98	Cole Whitt	Premium Motorsports	Chevrolet
Official entry list

== Practice ==
=== First practice ===
Martin Truex Jr. was the fastest in the first practice session with a time of 35.724 and a speed of 201.545 mph (324.355 km/h).

Pos	No.	Driver	Team	Manufacturer	Time	Speed
1	78	Martin Truex Jr.	Furniture Row Racing	Toyota	35.724	201.545
2	48	Jimmie Johnson	Hendrick Motorsports	Chevrolet	35.797	201.134
3	22	Joey Logano	Team Penske	Ford	35.827	200.966
Official first practice results

=== Second practice ===
Tony Stewart was the fastest in the second practice session with a time of 35.622 and a speed of 202.122 mph (325.284 km/h).

Pos	No.	Driver	Team	Manufacturer	Time	Speed
1	14	Tony Stewart	Stewart–Haas Racing	Chevrolet	35.622	202.122
2	21	Ryan Blaney (R)	Wood Brothers Racing	Ford	35.745	201.427
3	24	Chase Elliott (R)	Hendrick Motorsports	Chevrolet	35.786	201.196
Official second practice results

=== Final practice ===
Denny Hamlin was the fastest in the final practice session with a time of 36.386 and a speed of 197.878 mph (318.454 km/h).

Pos	No.	Driver	Team	Manufacturer	Time	Speed
1	11	Denny Hamlin	Joe Gibbs Racing	Toyota	36.386	197.878
2	24	Chase Elliott (R)	Hendrick Motorsports	Chevrolet	36.403	197.786
3	48	Jimmie Johnson	Hendrick Motorsports	Chevrolet	36.420	197.694
Official final practice results

== Qualifying ==
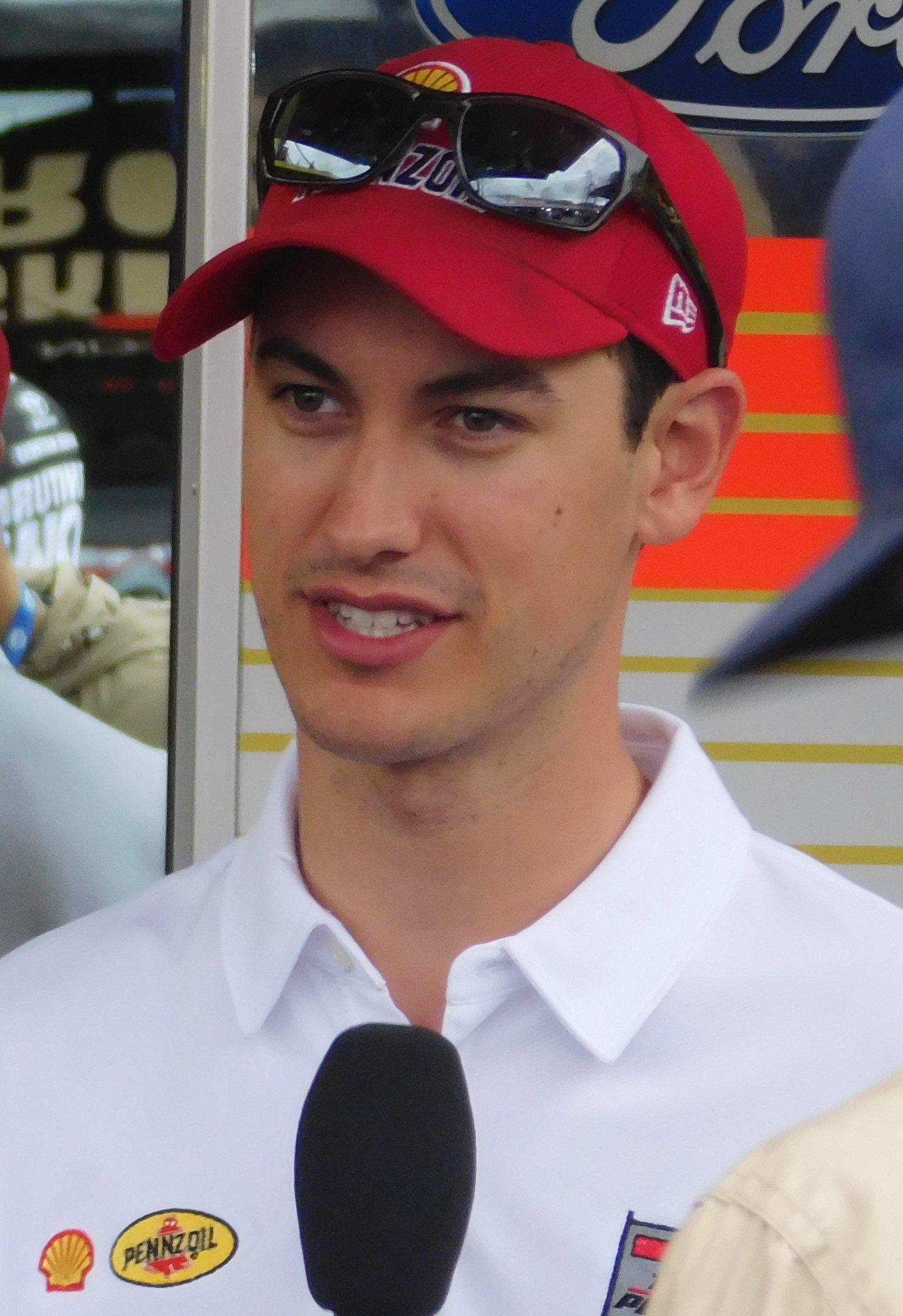
Joey Logano scored the pole position.

Joey Logano scored the pole for the race with a time of 35.697 and a speed of 201.698 mph (324.601 km/h). Logano said afterwards that he was "excited (about the pole). I thought our car was really good in race trim earlier. ... In qualifying trim, I didn’t think we would make it happen today, but on the last run, Todd Gordon (crew chief) made some good adjustments and gave me a pep talk, and game on. I was ready to go. I was going to drive the heck out of it and hope for the best. Once you get into the last round (of qualifying) and you are eighth on the board, what is the difference between eighth and 12th? You might as well hammer down.” He also added that Michigan "is very unique. For one, you're going 220 mph. That's freaking insane. But it's a lot of fun."

"It was just an awesome day for this Lowe's race car and this Lowe's race team," Jimmie Johnson said after qualifying second. "We keep stacking pennies and making this car better and better. My hat's off to everyone at Hendrick Motorsports and all the hard work they're putting into things. Great practice and great qualifying. We need some more practice sessions (Saturday) and roll them into a good race."

=== Qualifying results ===
Pos	No.	Driver	Team	Manufacturer	R1	R2	R3
1	22	Joey Logano	Team Penske	Ford	35.999	35.884	35.697
2	48	Jimmie Johnson	Hendrick Motorsports	Chevrolet	35.797	35.810	35.728
3	11	Denny Hamlin	Joe Gibbs Racing	Toyota	35.863	35.801	35.747
4	4	Kevin Harvick	Stewart–Haas Racing	Chevrolet	36.086	35.818	35.753
5	24	Chase Elliott (R)	Hendrick Motorsports	Chevrolet	35.951	35.692	35.767
6	88	Alex Bowman (i)	Hendrick Motorsports	Chevrolet	35.963	35.891	35.784
7	21	Ryan Blaney (R)	Wood Brothers Racing	Ford	36.054	35.833	35.785
8	1	Jamie McMurray	Chip Ganassi Racing	Chevrolet	36.026	35.722	35.814
9	19	Carl Edwards	Joe Gibbs Racing	Toyota	36.035	35.900	35.820
10	31	Ryan Newman	Richard Childress Racing	Chevrolet	36.140	35.909	35.917
11	5	Kasey Kahne	Hendrick Motorsports	Chevrolet	36.078	35.908	35.995
12	42	Kyle Larson	Chip Ganassi Racing	Chevrolet	35.884	35.665	36.119
13	20	Matt Kenseth	Joe Gibbs Racing	Toyota	36.000	35.930	
14	78	Martin Truex Jr.	Furniture Row Racing	Toyota	35.964	35.936	
15	14	Tony Stewart	Stewart–Haas Racing	Chevrolet	36.113	35.942	
16	18	Kyle Busch	Joe Gibbs Racing	Toyota	36.102	35.956	
17	3	Austin Dillon	Richard Childress Racing	Chevrolet	36.212	35.981	
18	2	Brad Keselowski	Team Penske	Ford	36.168	35.997	
19	41	Kurt Busch	Stewart–Haas Racing	Chevrolet	36.004	36.135	
20	27	Paul Menard	Richard Childress Racing	Chevrolet	35.923	36.144	
21	34	Chris Buescher (R)	Front Row Motorsports	Ford	36.270	36.197	
22	16	Greg Biffle	Roush Fenway Racing	Ford	36.159	36.219	
23	10	Danica Patrick	Stewart–Haas Racing	Chevrolet	36.300	36.227	
24	6	Trevor Bayne	Roush Fenway Racing	Ford	36.306	36.330	
25	47	A. J. Allmendinger	JTG Daugherty Racing	Chevrolet	36.315		
26	43	Aric Almirola	Richard Petty Motorsports	Ford	36.331		
27	15	Clint Bowyer	HScott Motorsports	Chevrolet	36.340		
28	13	Casey Mears	Germin Racing	Chevrolet	36.446		
29	17	Ricky Stenhouse Jr.	Roush Fenway Racing	Ford	36.454		
30	44	Brian Scott (R)	Richard Petty Motorsports	Ford	36.715		
31	7	Regan Smith	Tommy Baldwin Racing	Chevrolet	36.719		
32	23	David Ragan	BK Racing	Toyota	36.724		
33	38	Landon Cassill	Front Row Motorsports	Ford	36.816		
34	83	Matt DiBenedetto	BK Racing	Toyota	36.893		
35	95	Sam Hornish Jr. (i)	Circle Sport – Leavine Family Racing	Chevrolet	37.026		
36	46	Michael Annett	HScott Motorsports	Chevrolet	37.337		
37	98	Cole Whitt	Premium Motorsports	Chevrolet	37.486		
38	30	Josh Wise	The Motorsports Group	Chevrolet	37.512		
39	55	Reed Sorenson	Premium Motorsports	Chevrolet	38.102		
40	32	Jeffrey Earnhardt (R)	Go FAS Racing	Ford	0.000		
Official qualifying results

== Race ==
=== First half ===
Under mostly cloudy Michigan skies, Joey Logano led the field to the green flag at 2:18 p.m. The field started to string out after five laps as is typical at a track like Michigan. Chris Buescher reported engine issues early on that turned out to be a broken spark plug. He said after the race that he knew "it isn’t fun opening a hood of a race car that is as hot as it is and trying to work on it. Kudos to my guys for keeping their heads down and working at it and getting it fixed. Usually when you have engine trouble you are along for the ride. It ended up being something a little more simple than I guess we originally figured. We got back up and running and made some laps, and made a really terrible day into just an okay day. We will have to get it back at the shop and tear it down and take a look at it — and diagnose from there to see if it was a freak accident or something we need to look at going forward.” The first caution of the race flew on lap 21. It was a scheduled competition caution for overnight rain. Regan Smith opted not to pit and assumed the race lead. He pitted the next lap and handed the lead back to Logano. Brian Scott was tagged for his crew being over the wall too soon and restarted the race from the tail end of the field.

The race restarted on lap 25. Kevin Harvick took the lead from Logano going into turn 1. The second caution of the race flew the same lap for a single-car spin. Exiting turn 4, Kyle Busch got loose and spun out.

The race restarted on lap 30. By lap 39, Alex Bowman – who was subbing for Dale Earnhardt Jr. – fell from sixth to out of the top-10 in what was later determined to be an ignition issue. Denny Hamlin radioed in electrical issues, but these subsided after a while. Martin Truex Jr. powered by Harvick on the frontstretch to take the lead on lap 59. Ryan Blaney hit pit road on lap 63 and triggered a rush of green flag pit stops. Truex pitted from the lead a lap later and handed the lead to Harvick. Truex lost time on pit road after his car fell off the jack. Harvick pitted from the lead on lap 67 and handed the lead to Brad Keselowski. He pitted on lap 71 and the lead cycled to Jimmie Johnson.

The routine of strung-out racing was the norm for the next 36 laps until Blaney kicked off the next round of green flag stops on lap 107. Johnson pitted the next lap and handed the lead to Chase Elliott. He pitted the next lap and handed the lead to Keselowski. He would stay out for another eight laps before pitting on lap 117 and the lead cycled to Elliott before debris brought out the third caution of the race on lap 118.

=== Second half ===
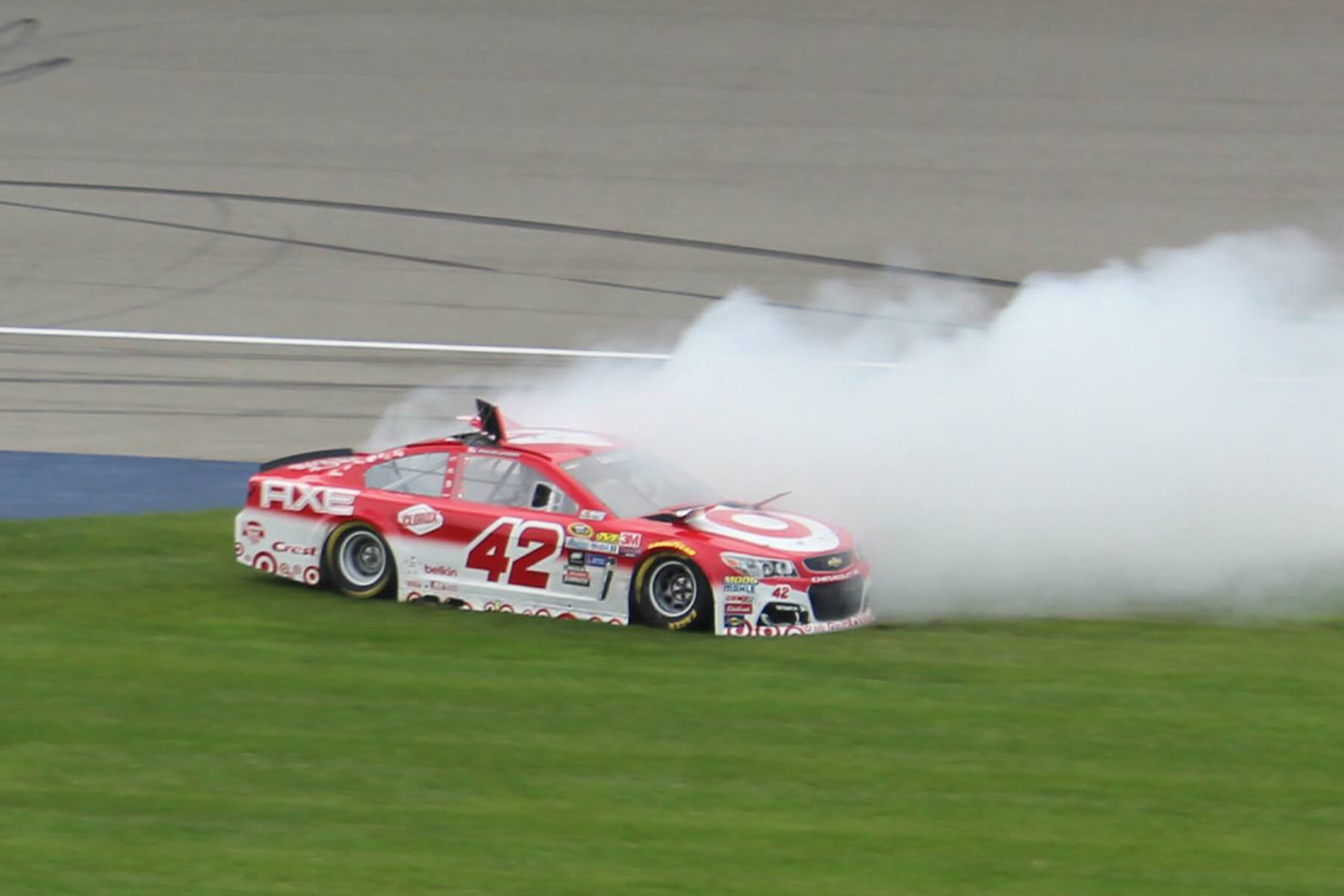
Kyle Larson pulls a burnout following his first career Cup win in the Pure Michigan 400

The race restarted on lap 126. Kyle Larson beat Elliott going into turn 1 to take the lead. After that, the field settled into place until Logano kicked off the final round of green flag stops with 47 laps to go. Larson pitted from the lead, along with Elliott, with 44 laps to go and handed the lead to Keselowski. Elliott beat Larson off pit road, which allowed him to take the lead when the pit stop cycle concluded. Keselowski pitted the next lap and handed the lead to Matt Kenseth. He pitted with 35 laps to go and handed the lead to Ryan Newman. He pitted with 33 laps to go and handed the lead to Greg Biffle. He pitted with 32 laps to go and the lead cycled to Elliott. During the pit cycle, Aric Almirola was black-flagged for an uncontrolled tire and was forced to serve a pass through penalty.

A tire carcass that came off the No. 46 of Michael Annett brought out the fourth caution of the race with 13 laps to go.

The race restarted with nine laps to go. Larson was pushed to the lead by Keselowski and drove on to score the victory.

== Post-race ==
=== Driver comments ===
Larson said in victory lane that his team has "worked hard to get a win, and we just haven't done it Finally, all the hard work by everybody, the hundreds of people at our race shop, people who have gotten me to the Cup Series all paid off. I couldn't quite catch my breath there after I got out of the car because I spent two minutes screaming. I was so pumped up. It was pretty special, and I will remember it forever. I have been close a few times in my career and to get it before my 100th career start next week is pretty awesome." He also took time to dedicate the victory to his friend, the late Bryan Clauson, saying "This one is for the Clauson family. We really miss Bryan. We love you guys. We’re going to miss him. We parked it for him, so that’s really cool."

Following a runner-up finish, Elliott said he "made another mistake. Had two opportunities to get out front there and kind of control the race and let Kyle get a better start on me. I spun the tires and didn’t do my job right. It’s about as simple as that. When your tires are spinning, you aren’t going forward. It’s definitely unfortunate. I hate to let my guys down like that. They bailed me out a few times today, and I gave it right back.’’

Keselowski expressed satisfaction with his third-place finish but said he had hoped to win. He supported the rules package, while noting that it needed further improvements.[1]

=== Penalties ===
On the Wednesday following the race, the No. 2 team was issued a P2 penalty for failing post-race technical inspection. As a result, Keselowski and Paul Wolfe were fined $15,000, and Keselowski was docked 10 points.

== Race results ==
Pos	No.	Driver	Team	Manufacturer	Laps	Points
1	42	Kyle Larson	Chip Ganassi Racing	Chevrolet	200	45
2	24	Chase Elliott (R)	Hendrick Motorsports	Chevrolet	200	40
3	2	Brad Keselowski	Team Penske	Ford	200	29
4	21	Ryan Blaney (R)	Wood Brothers Racing	Ford	200	37
5	4	Kevin Harvick	Stewart–Haas Racing	Chevrolet	200	37
6	48	Jimmie Johnson	Hendrick Motorsports	Chevrolet	200	36
7	19	Carl Edwards	Joe Gibbs Racing	Toyota	200	35
8	1	Jamie McMurray	Chip Ganassi Racing	Chevrolet	200	33
9	11	Denny Hamlin	Joe Gibbs Racing	Toyota	200	32
10	22	Joey Logano	Team Penske	Ford	200	32
11	16	Greg Biffle	Roush Fenway Racing	Ford	200	31
12	41	Kurt Busch	Stewart–Haas Racing	Chevrolet	200	29
13	20	Matt Kenseth	Joe Gibbs Racing	Toyota	200	29
14	5	Kasey Kahne	Hendrick Motorsports	Chevrolet	200	27
15	47	A. J. Allmendinger	JTG Daugherty Racing	Chevrolet	200	26
16	3	Austin Dillon	Richard Childress Racing	Chevrolet	200	26
17	31	Ryan Newman	Richard Childress Racing	Chevrolet	200	25
18	27	Paul Menard	Richard Childress Racing	Chevrolet	200	23
19	18	Kyle Busch	Joe Gibbs Racing	Toyota	199	22
20	78	Martin Truex Jr.	Furniture Row Racing	Toyota	199	22
21	14	Tony Stewart	Stewart–Haas Racing	Chevrolet	198	20
22	13	Casey Mears	Germain Racing	Chevrolet	198	19
23	10	Danica Patrick	Stewart–Haas Racing	Chevrolet	198	18
24	6	Trevor Bayne	Roush Fenway Racing	Ford	198	17
25	43	Aric Almirola	Richard Petty Motorsports	Ford	198	16
26	7	Regan Smith	Tommy Baldwin Racing	Chevrolet	198	16
27	17	Ricky Stenhouse Jr.	Roush Fenway Racing	Ford	198	14
28	44	Brian Scott (R)	Richard Petty Motorsports	Ford	197	13
29	23	David Ragan	BK Racing	Toyota	196	12
30	88	Alex Bowman (i)	Hendrick Motorsports	Chevrolet	195	0
31	95	Michael McDowell	Circle Sport – Leavine Family Racing	Chevrolet	195	10
32	83	Matt DiBenedetto	BK Racing	Toyota	195	9
33	46	Michael Annett	HScott Motorsports	Chevrolet	195	8
34	98	Cole Whitt	Premium Motorsports	Chevrolet	194	7
35	34	Chris Buescher (R)	Front Row Motorsports	Ford	193	6
36	55	Reed Sorenson	Premium Motorsports	Chevrolet	193	5
37	32	Jeffrey Earnhardt (R)	Go FAS Racing	Ford	192	4
38	30	Josh Wise	The Motorsports Group	Chevrolet	192	3
39	38	Landon Cassill	Front Row Motorsports	Ford	174	2
40	15	Clint Bowyer	HScott Motorsports	Chevrolet	160	1
Official race results

=== Race summary ===
- Lead changes: 13 among different drivers
- Cautions/Laps: 4 for 17
- Red flags: 0
- Time of race: 2 hours, 27 minutes and 29 seconds
- Average speed: 162.730 miles per hour (261.889 km/h)

== Media ==
=== Television ===
NBC Sports covered the race on the television side. Rick Allen, Jeff Burton and Steve Letarte had the call in the booth for the race. Dave Burns, Mike Massaro, Marty Snider and Kelli Stavast reported from pit lane during the race.

NBCSN
Booth announcers	Pit reporters
Lap-by-lap: Rick Allen; Color-commentator: Jeff Burton; Color-commentator: Steve Letarte	Dave Burns; Mike Massaro; Marty Snider; Kelli Stavast

=== Radio ===
The Motor Racing Network had the radio call for the race, which was simulcast on Sirius XM NASCAR Radio.

MRN
Booth announcers	Turn announcers	Pit reporters
Lead announcer: Kurt Becker; Announcer: Jeff Striegle	Turns 1 & 2: Dave Moody; Turns 3 & 4: Alex Hayden	Kim Coon; Winston Kelley; Steve Post

== Standings after the race ==
Drivers' Championship standings
	Pos	Manufacturer	Points
	1	Kevin Harvick	799
	2	Brad Keselowski	764 (–35)
1	3	Carl Edwards	724 (–75)
1	4	Kurt Busch	721 (–78)
	5	Joey Logano	716 (–83)
	6	Kyle Busch	696 (–103)
	7	Denny Hamlin	691 (–108)
	8	Martin Truex Jr.	652 (–147)
	9	Jimmie Johnson	648 (–151)
	10	Matt Kenseth	633 (–166)
1	11	Chase Elliott	628 (–171)
1	12	Austin Dillon	622 (–177)
	13	Jamie McMurray	616 (–183)
	14	Ryan Newman	601 (–198)
1	15	Kyle Larson	582 (–217)
1	16	Kasey Kahne	564 (–235)
Official driver's standings

Manufacturers' Championship standings
Pos	Manufacturer	Points
1	Toyota	984
2	Chevrolet	964 (–20)
3	Ford	921 (–63)
Official manufacturers' standings

- Note: Only the first 16 positions are included for the driver standings.
  . – Driver has clinched a position in the Chase for the Sprint Cup.

Previous race: 2016 Bass Pro Shops NRA Night Race	Sprint Cup Series; 2016 season	Next race: 2016 Bojangles' Southern 500
