= Erik Darnell =

American racing driver (born 1982)

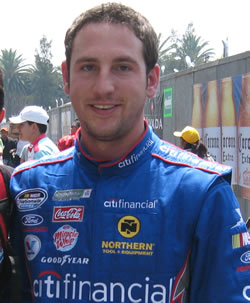
- Darnell at Autódromo Hermanos Rodríguez in 2008
- Born: Erik Louis Darnell; December 2, 1982 (age 43); Beach Park, Illinois, U.S.
- Achievements: 2003 Wisconsin Challenge Series Champion
- Awards: 2006 Craftsman Truck Series Rookie of the Year

NASCAR Cup Series career
- 9 races run over 2 years
- 2011 position: 51st
- Best finish: 47th (2009)
- First race: 2009 Pep Boys Auto 500 (Atlanta)
- Last race: 2011 Good Sam RV Insurance 500 (Pocono)
Wins	Top tens	Poles
0	0	0

NASCAR O'Reilly Auto Parts Series career
- 52 races run over 5 years
- 2012 position: 17th
- Best finish: 17th (2012)
- First race: 2008 Corona México 200 (Mexico City)
- Last race: 2012 Ford EcoBoost 300 (Homestead)
Wins	Top tens	Poles
0	5	1

NASCAR FedEx Freight Truck Series career
- 77 races run over 5 years
- 2021 position: 66th
- Best finish: 4th (2008)
- First race: 2004 Black Cat Fireworks 200 (Milwaukee)
- Last race: 2021 LiftKits4Less.com 200 (Darlington)
- First win: 2007 O'Reilly Auto Parts 250 (Kansas)
- Last win: 2008 Cool City Customs 200 (Michigan)
Wins	Top tens	Poles
2	32	3

ARCA Menards Series career
- 9 races run over 2 years
- Best finish: 38th (2005)
- First race: 2005 ARCA 150 (Milwaukee)
- Last race: 2007 Michigan ARCA 200 (Michigan)
- First win: 2007 Buckle Up Kentucky 150 (Kentucky)
- Last win: 2007 Michigan ARCA 200 (Michigan)
Wins	Top tens	Poles
2	6	0
- Statistics up to date as of December 30, 2021.

Erik Louis Darnell (born December 2, 1982) is an American professional stock car racing driver. He is the grandson of former USAC and NASCAR driver Bay Darnell, who also started three NASCAR races (including one for Holman Moody). Darnell formerly drove for Roush Fenway Racing, joining the team in 2005 after being a co-winner on the Discovery Channel program Roush Racing: Driver X, along with David Ragan.

== Racing career ==
=== Early career ===
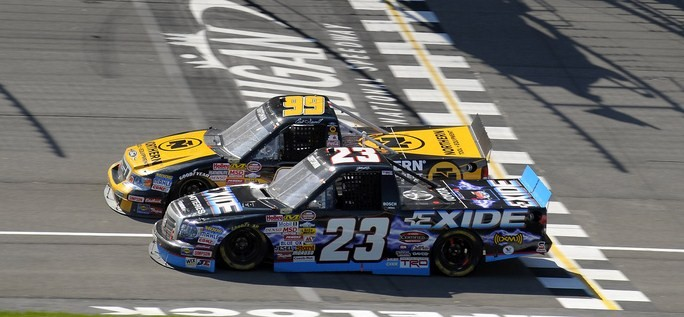
Darnell beating Johnny Benson to the line to win at Michigan in 2008

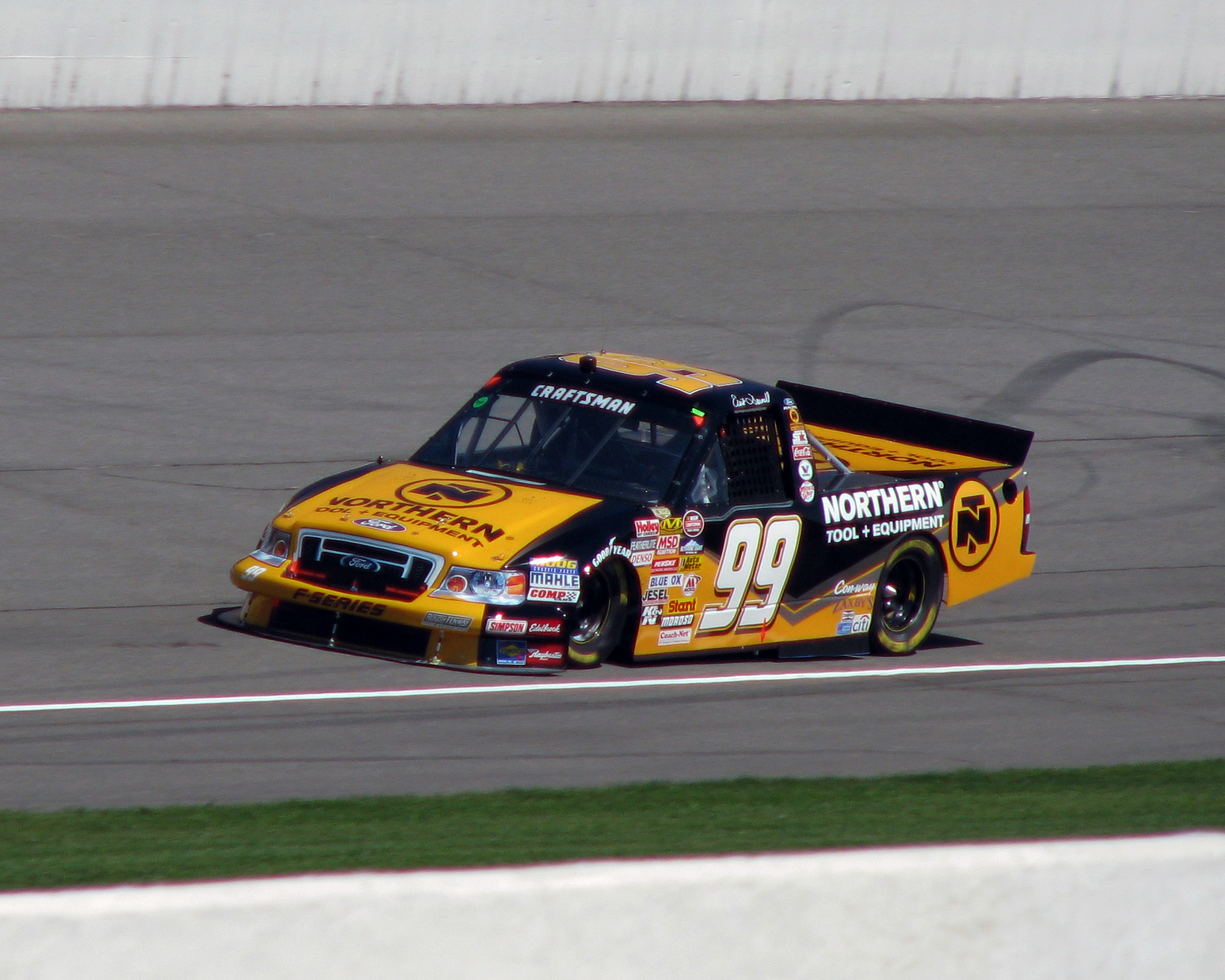
Darnell's 2008 Truck at Michigan

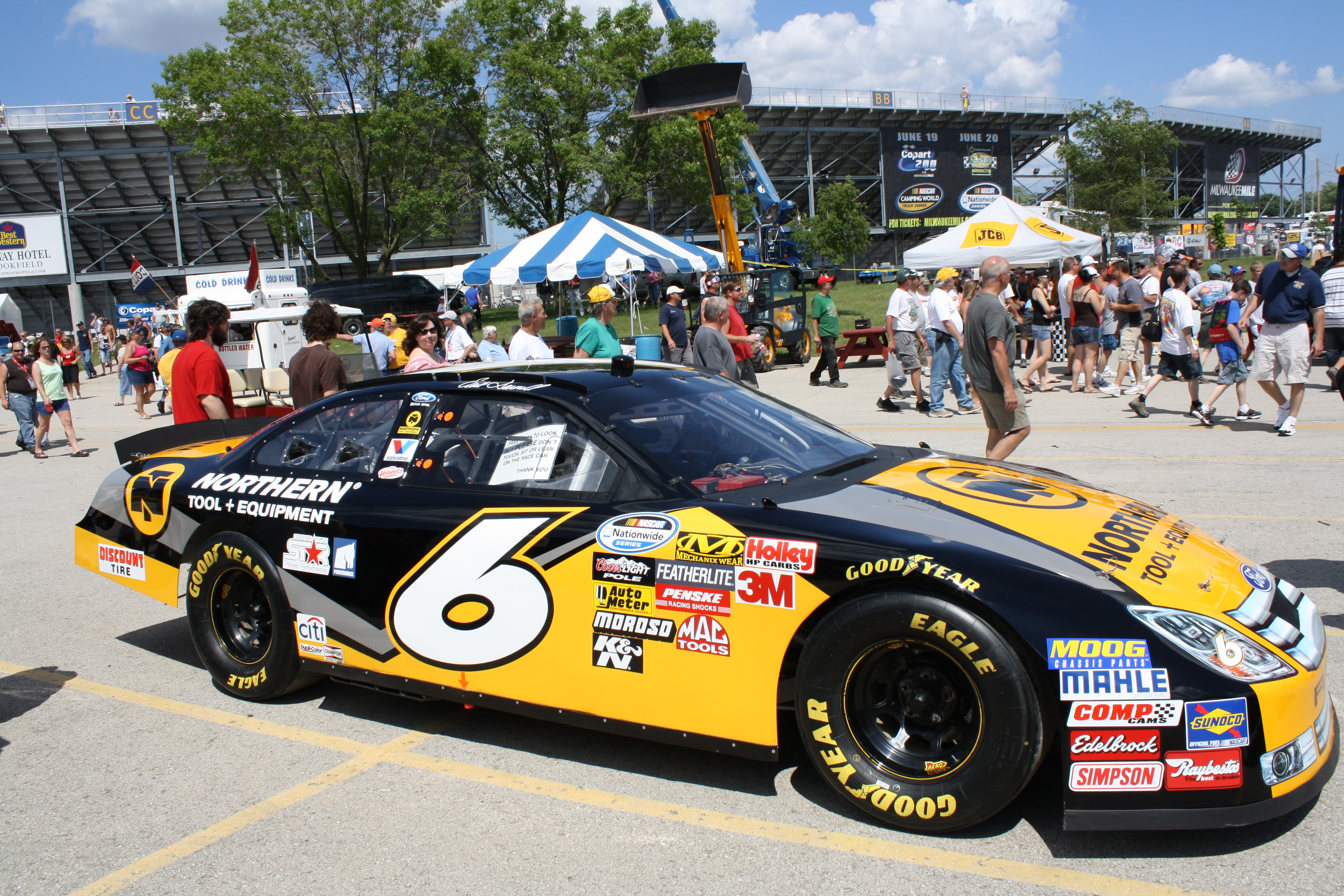
Darnell's 2009 Nationwide car at Milwaukee

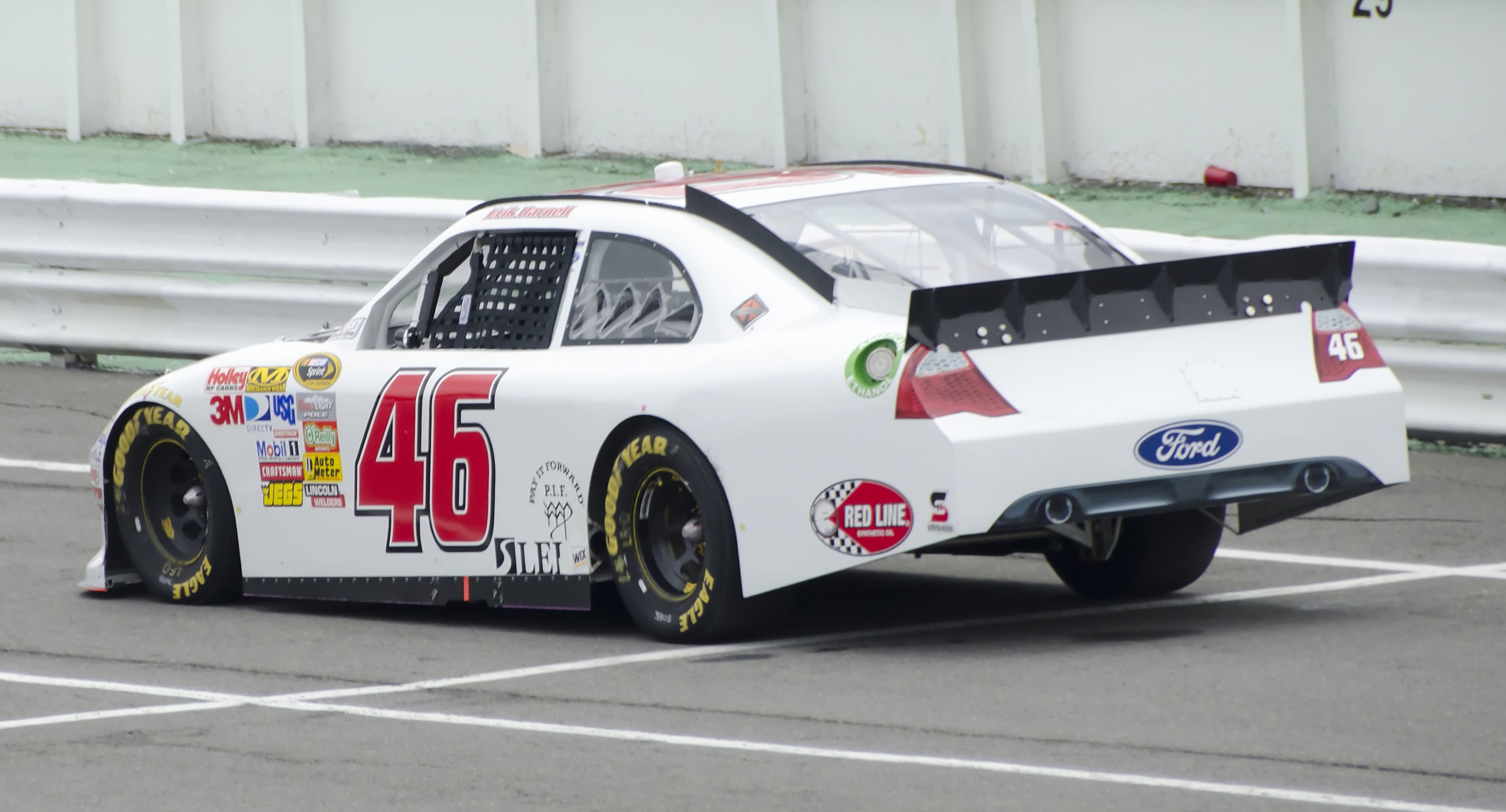
Darnell's 2011 Cup car at Pocono in August

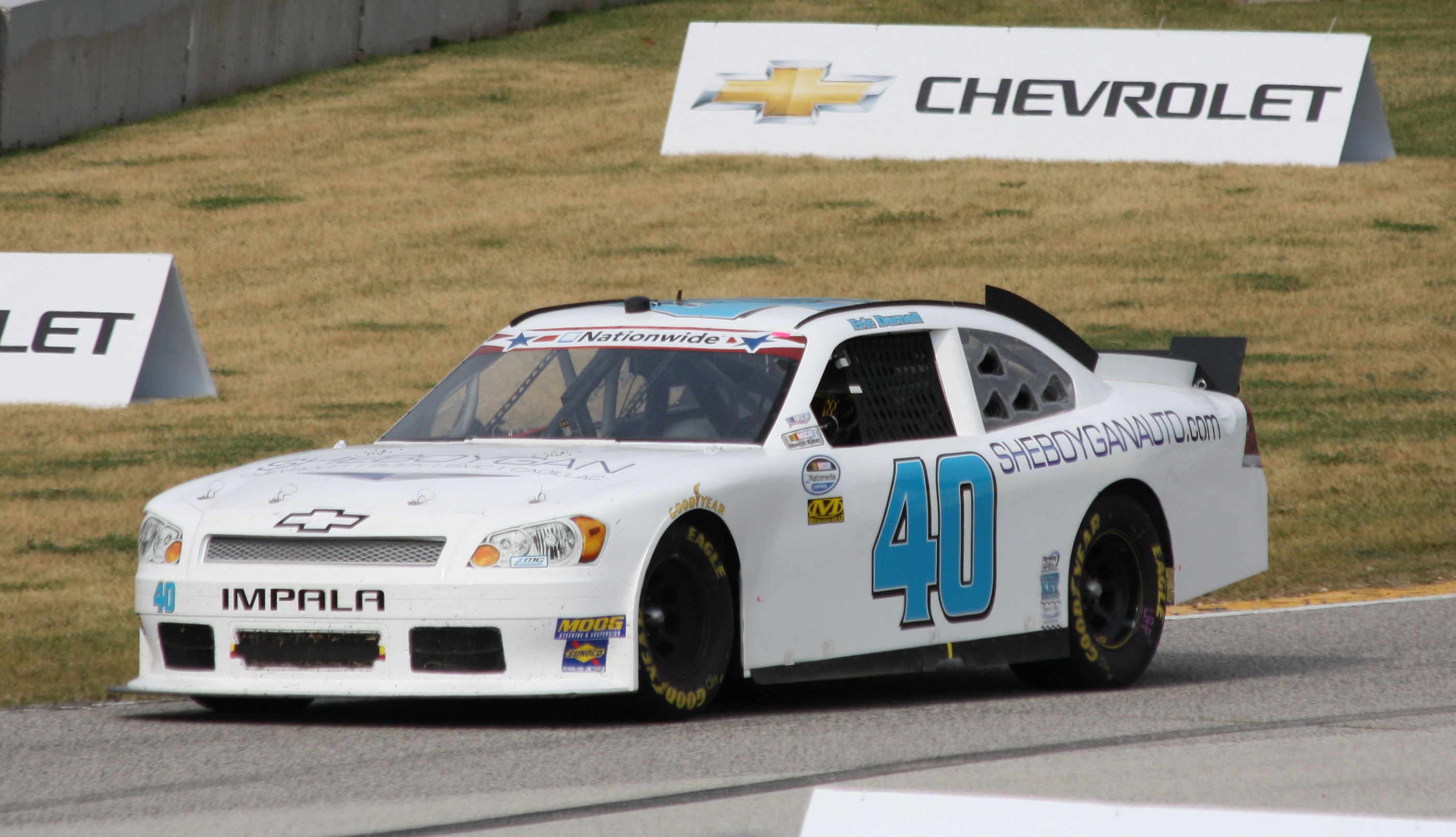
Darnell's 2012 Nationwide car at Road America

Darnell began racing at the age of twelve in the River Valley Kart Club. He won the championship in the purple plate class in his second year of competition, later racing Allison Legacy Series cars after go karts. His first year of super late models was at Illiana Motor Speedway, with Darnell finishing third in the final standings with one win. Erik beat the best Wisconsin super late model drivers to win the 2003 Wisconsin Challenge Series championship. At that time, his five wins were the most in the series' history. He set the super late model track record at Lake Geneva Raceway in 2004.

=== 2004–2012: NASCAR and ARCA ===
Darnell drove in his first NASCAR Craftsman Truck Series race at Milwaukee in 2004, finishing 26th. He also raced in numerous NASCAR touring series races.

Darnell drove in several NASCAR touring series and six ARCA races in 2005.

Darnell raced full-time in the Truck Series in 2006. He had twelve top-ten finishes in 25 events, and he was the series' Rookie of the Year. He continued to drive for the team in 2007, as well as testing the team's Busch Series cars. On April 28, 2007, Darnell won the O'Reilly Auto Parts 250 at Kansas Speedway for his first Truck Series win.

Darnell started the 2008 season by capturing the pole position at the Daytona International Speedway. He won his second career CTS race in June 2008 at Michigan International Speedway by .005 of a second over Johnny Benson.

For 2009, Darnell planned to compete in 15 NASCAR Nationwide Series races, sharing the car with Cup Series driver David Ragan, and would also run for Rookie of the Year. The first race on his schedule was at Richmond International Raceway where he finished twelfth. Also, Darnell competed in seven of the final eleven NASCAR Sprint Cup Series races. He ran the car at Atlanta, Loudon, Kansas, Talladega, Texas, Phoenix, and Homestead. Darnell competed in the No. 96 Academy Sports + Outdoors Ford for the Atlanta, Talladega, and Texas races. He alternated the ride with Bobby Labonte.

In 2010, Darnell found himself without a ride for most of the season due to the lack of sponsorship. He continued to stay on at Roush Fenway Racing as a practice-qualifying driver for Carl Edwards at the standalone Nationwide Series races. Darnell did a three race deal to drive Roush's No. 16 Ford in the Nationwide Series. His best finish was fourteenth at Dover and Texas.

In 2011, Darnell returned to the Cup Series, driving for Whitney Motorsports in several races. In 2012, he competed for The Motorsports Group (formerly Key Motorsports) in the Nationwide Series.

=== 2013–present: Post-NASCAR career ===
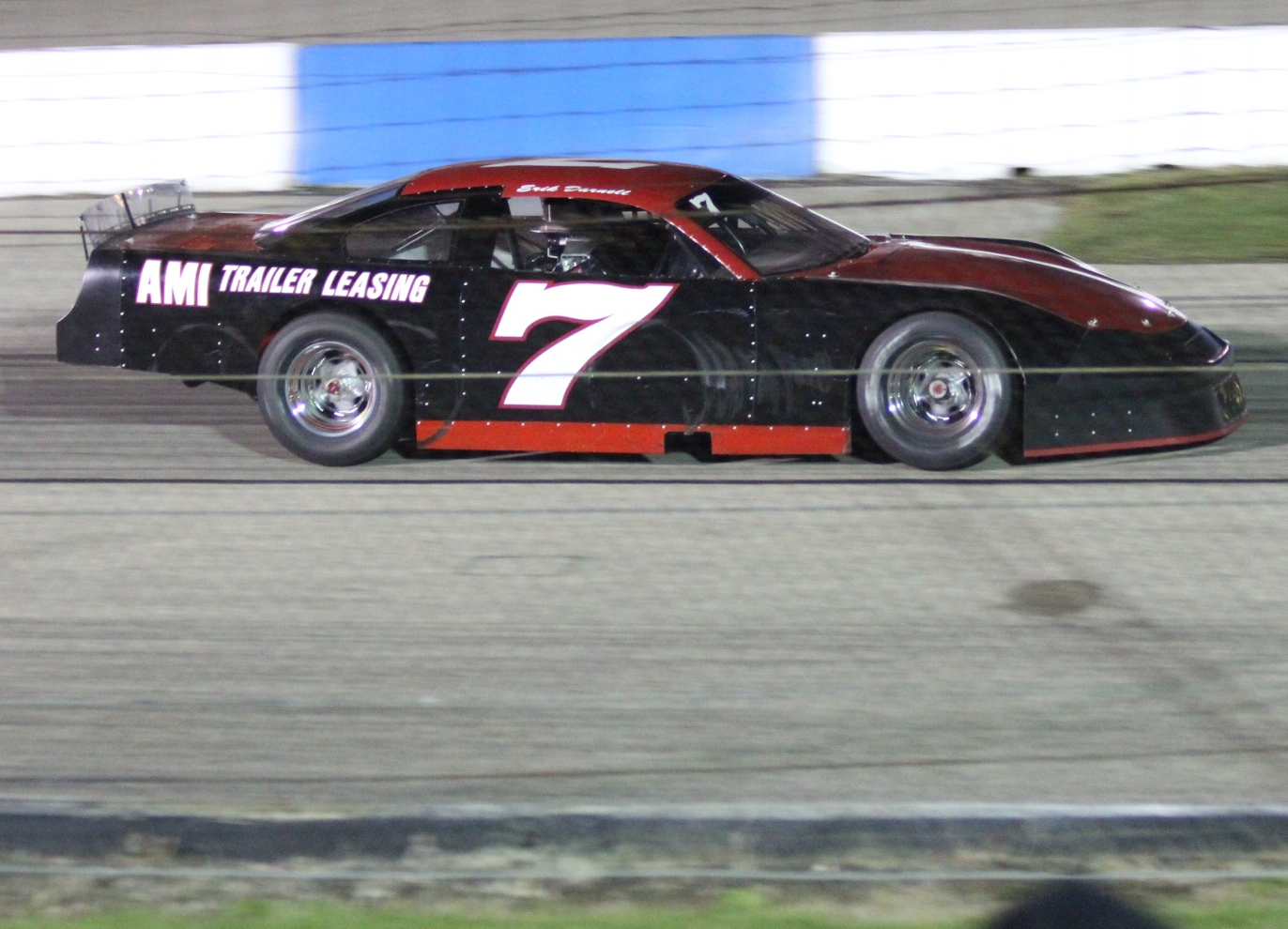
Darnell's Super Late Model at La Crosse in 2013

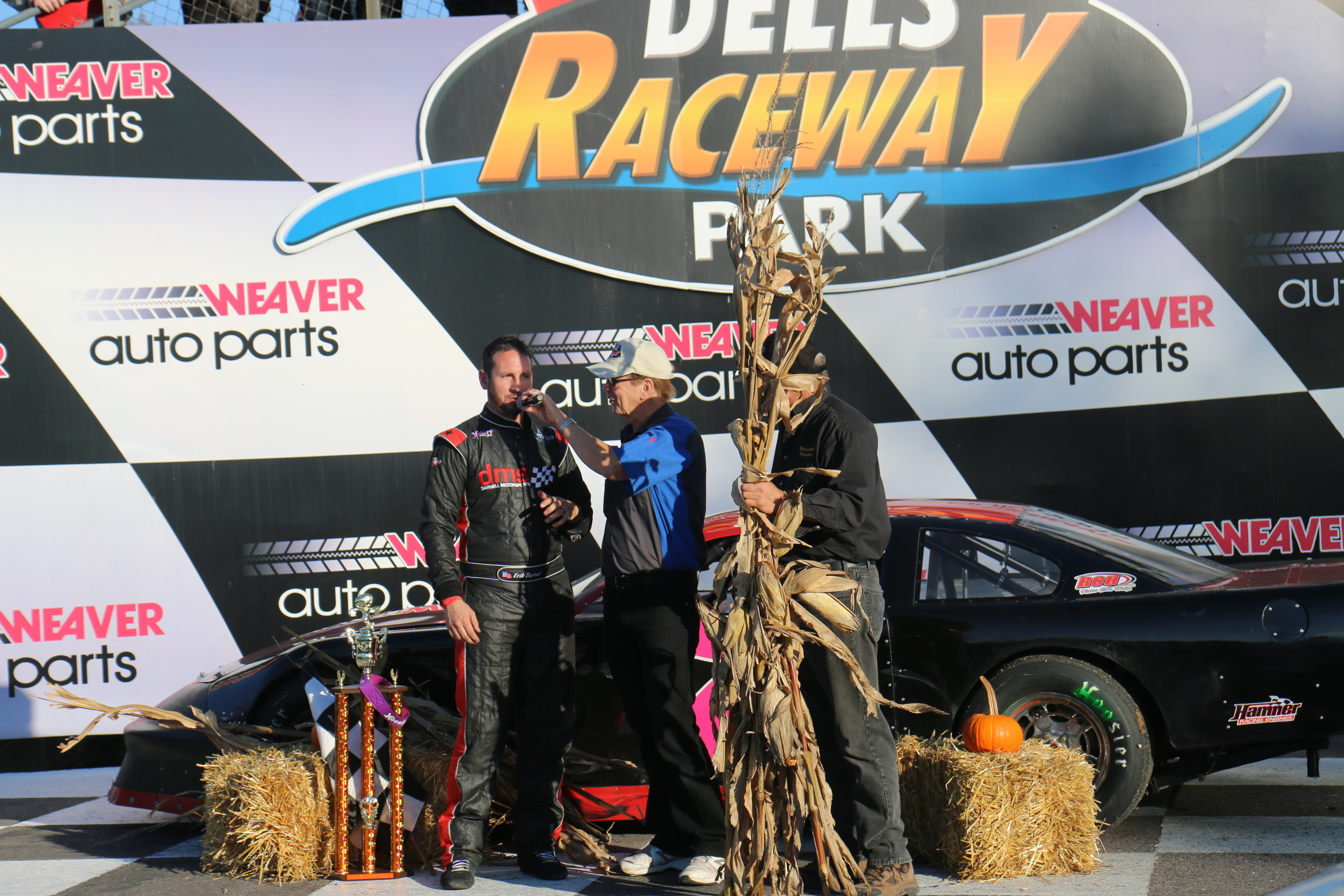
Darnell in victory lane at Dells Raceway Park in 2016

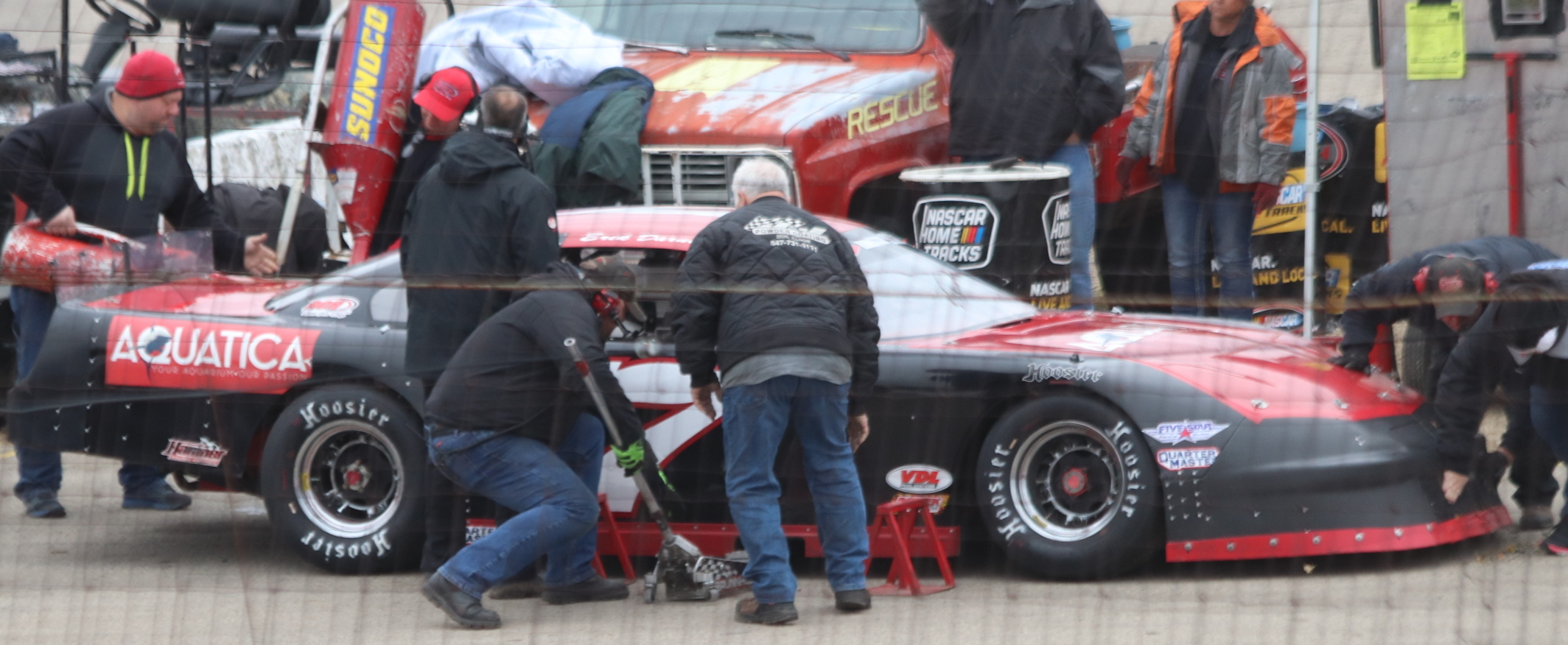
Darnell's Super Late Model at La Crosse in 2018

Darnell didn't race in NASCAR during 2013. He won the Dick Trickle 99 Super Late Model Oktoberfest race at LaCrosse Fairgrounds Speedway in October 2013. He has made occasional starts in various Midwest series since. Darnell led much of the second half of the 2019 Oktoberfest ARCA Midwest Tour race at La Crosse Fairgrounds Speedway before finishing third behind Ty Majeski.

=== 2021: Return to NASCAR ===
On May 3, 2021, it was revealed through the release of the entry list for the Truck Series race at Darlington that Darnell would drive the No. 45 for Niece Motorsports in that race with sponsorship from his former sponsor at Roush, Northern Tool + Equipment. This would be his first start in NASCAR since 2012 and first in the Truck Series since 2008.

== Motorsports career results ==
=== NASCAR ===
(key) (Bold - Pole position awarded by qualifying time. Italics - Pole position earned by points standings or practice time. * – Most laps led.)

==== Sprint Cup Series ====
NASCAR Sprint Cup Series results
Year	Team	No.	Make	1	2	3	4	5	6	7	8	9	10	11	12	13	14	15	16	17	18	19	20	21	22	23	24	25	26	27	28	29	30	31	32	33	34	35	36	NSCC	Pts	Ref
2009	Hall of Fame Racing	96	Ford	DAY	CAL	LVS	ATL	BRI	MAR	TEX	PHO	TAL	RCH	DAR	CLT	DOV	POC	MCH	SON	NHA	DAY	CHI	IND	POC	GLN	MCH	BRI	ATL; 30	RCH	NHA; 30	DOV	KAN; 29	CAL	CLT	MAR	TAL; 37	TEX; 30	PHO; 31	HOM; 36	47th	472	
2011	Whitney Motorsports	46	Chevy	DAY	PHO	LVS	BRI	CAL	MAR	TEX	TAL	RCH	DAR	DOV	CLT	KAN	POC	MCH	SON	DAY	KEN	NHA; 39																		51st	2	
2011	Whitney Motorsports	46	Ford																				IND; DNQ	POC; 42	GLN	MCH; DNQ	BRI	ATL												51st	2	
2011	Max Q Motorsports	37	Ford																										RCH; DNQ	CHI	NHA	DOV	KAN	CLT	TAL	MAR	TEX	PHO	HOM	51st	2	

==== Nationwide Series ====
NASCAR Nationwide Series results
Year	Team	No.	Make	1	2	3	4	5	6	7	8	9	10	11	12	13	14	15	16	17	18	19	20	21	22	23	24	25	26	27	28	29	30	31	32	33	34	35	NNSC	Pts	Ref
2007	Roush Fenway Racing	6	Ford	DAY	CAL	MXC	LVS	ATL	BRI	NSH	TEX	PHO	TAL	RCH	DAR	CLT	DOV	NSH	KEN	MLW	NHA	DAY	CHI	GTY	IRP; QL^{†}	CGV	GLN	MCH	BRI	CAL	RCH	DOV	KAN	CLT	MEM	TEX	PHO	HOM	N/A	0	
2008	Roush Fenway Racing	17	Ford	DAY	CAL	LVS	ATL	BRI	NSH	TEX	PHO	MXC; 26	TAL	RCH	DAR	CLT	DOV	NSH	KEN																				119th	85	
2008	Roush Fenway Racing	60	Ford																	MLW; QL^{‡}	NHA	DAY	CHI	GTY	IRP	CGV	GLN	MCH	BRI	CAL	RCH	DOV	KAN	CLT	MEM	TEX	PHO	HOM	119th	85	
2009	Roush Fenway Racing	6	Ford	DAY	CAL	LVS	BRI	TEX	NSH	PHO	TAL	RCH; 12	DAR; 4	CLT	DOV	NSH; 9	KEN; 11	**MLW**; 4	NHA; 9	DAY	CHI	GTY; 10	IRP; 29	IOW; 23	GLN	MCH	BRI	CGV; 12	ATL	RCH; 14	DOV; 17	KAN; 18	CAL	CLT; 34	MEM; 31	TEX	PHO	HOM; 31	26th	1837	
2010	Roush Fenway Racing	16	Ford	DAY	CAL	LVS	BRI	NSH	PHO	TEX	TAL	RCH	DAR	DOV	CLT	NSH	KEN	ROA	NHA	DAY	CHI	GTY	IRP	IOW	GLN	MCH	BRI	CGV	ATL	RCH; 22	DOV; 14	KAN	CAL	CLT		TEX; 14	PHO	HOM	82nd	339	
2010	Roush Fenway Racing	60	Ford																																GTY; QL^{‡}				82nd	339	
2011	Key Motorsports	42	Chevy	DAY	PHO	LVS	BRI	CAL	TEX	TAL	NSH	RCH	DAR	DOV	IOW	CLT	CHI	MCH	ROA	DAY	KEN	NHA	NSH	IRP	IOW	GLN	CGV	BRI	ATL	RCH	CHI	DOV	KAN	CLT; 42	TEX; DNQ	PHO	HOM		113th	0^{1}	
2012	The Motorsports Group	42	Chevy	DAY; DNQ																																			17th	558	
2012	The Motorsports Group	40	Chevy		PHO; 26	LVS; 35	BRI; 21	CAL; 24	TEX; 23	RCH; 35	TAL; 14	DAR; 29	IOW; 18	CLT; 27	DOV; 27	MCH; 22	ROA; 23	KEN; 25	DAY; 21	NHA; 40	CHI; 30	IND; 38	IOW; 27	GLN	CGV; 16	BRI; 35	ATL; 20	RCH; 18	CHI; 22	KEN; 24	DOV; 31	CLT; 21	KAN; 17	TEX; 25	PHO; 37	HOM; 35			17th	558	
^{†} - Qualified for David Ragan · ^{‡} - Qualified for Carl Edwards

==== Camping World Truck Series ====
NASCAR Camping World Truck Series results
Year	Team	No.	Make	1	2	3	4	5	6	7	8	9	10	11	12	13	14	15	16	17	18	19	20	21	22	23	24	25	NCWTC	Pts	Ref
2004	MRD Motorsports	06	Ford	DAY	ATL	MAR	MFD	CLT	DOV	TEX	MEM	MLW; 26	KAN	KEN	GTW	MCH	IRP	NSH	BRI	RCH	NHA	LVS	CAL	TEX	MAR	PHO	DAR	HOM	100th	85	
2006	Roush Racing	99	Ford	DAY; 6	CAL; 11	ATL; 8	MAR; 11	GTY; 31	CLT; 10	MFD; 13	DOV; 25	TEX; 35	MCH; 12	MLW; 27	KAN; 26	KEN; 9	MEM; 2	IRP; 10	**NSH**; 12	BRI; 18	NHA; 9	LVS; 17	TAL; 19	MAR; 3	ATL; 3	TEX; 9	PHO; 10	HOM; 3	12th	3136	
2007	Roush Fenway Racing	99	Ford	DAY; 12	CAL; 13	ATL; 24	MAR; 18	KAN; 1*	CLT; 30	MFD; 15	DOV; 18	TEX; 32	MCH; 26	MLW; 6	MEM; 9	KEN; 29	IRP; 7	NSH; 9	BRI; 13	GTW; 7	NHA; 2	LVS; 5	TAL; 29	MAR; 25	ATL; 26	TEX; 14	PHO; 35	HOM; 24	12th	2875	
2008	Roush Fenway Racing	99	Ford	**DAY**; 21	CAL; 11	ATL; 12	MAR; 5	KAN; 28	CLT; 4	MFD; 11	DOV; 25	TEX; 24	MCH; 1	MLW; 4	MEM; 2	KEN; 29	IRP; 3	NSH; 2	BRI; 15	GTW; 6	NHA; 4	LVS; 2*	**TAL**; 12*	MAR; 19	ATL; 6	TEX; 18	PHO; 7	HOM; 11	4th	3412	
2021	Niece Motorsports	45	Chevy	DAY	DAY	LVS	ATL	BRI	RCH	KAN	DAR; 17	COA	CLT	TEX	NSH	POC	KNX	GLN	GTW	DAR	BRI	LVS	TAL	MAR	PHO				66th	20	

=== ARCA Re/Max Series ===
(key) (Bold – Pole position awarded by qualifying time. Italics – Pole position earned by points standings or practice time. * – Most laps led.)

ARCA Re/Max Series results
Year	Team	No.	Make	1	2	3	4	5	6	7	8	9	10	11	12	13	14	15	16	17	18	19	20	21	22	23	ARMC	Pts	Ref
2005	Roulo Brothers Racing	39	Ford	DAY	NSH	SLM	KEN	TOL	LAN	MIL; 4	POC	MCH	KAN	KEN	BLN	POC	GTW; 5	LER	NSH; 8	MCH; 20	ISF	TOL	DSF	CHI; 32	SLM	TAL; 13	38th	980	
2007	Roush Fenway Racing	99	Ford	DAY	USA	NSH	SLM	KAN; 2	WIN	KEN; 1*	TOL	IOW	POC	MCH; 1*	BLN	KEN	POC	NSH	ISF	MIL	GTW	DSF	CHI	SLM	TAL	TOL	47th	700	

=== CARS Super Late Model Tour ===
(key)

CARS Super Late Model Tour results
Year	Team	No.	Make	1	2	3	4	5	6	7	8	9	10	11	12	13	CSLMTC	Pts	Ref
2017	N/A	7D	N/A	CON	DOM	DOM	HCY	HCY	BRI; DNQ	AND	ROU	TCM	ROU	HCY	CON	SBO	N/A	0	

Achievements
Preceded by Todd Kluever	NASCAR Craftsman Truck Series Rookie of the Year; 2007	Succeeded by Willie Allen
