= Whitney Motorsports =

- Owner: Dusty Whitney
- Base: Huntersville, North Carolina
- Series: Sprint Cup Series
- Race drivers: Terry Cook; J. J. Yeley; Michael McDowell; Scott Riggs; Terry Labonte; Bill Elliott; Brian Simo; Andy Pilgrim; Erik Darnell; Scott Speed
- Manufacturer: Chevrolet; Ford; Dodge
- Opened: 2010
- Closed: 2011

Career
- Debut: 2010 Food City 500 (Bristol)
- Latest race: 2011 Kobalt Tools 500 (Phoenix)
- Drivers' Championships: 0
- Race victories: 0
- Pole positions: 0

Whitney Motorsports was a NASCAR team that competed in the Sprint Cup Series. It was based in Huntersville, North Carolina.

== Sprint Cup Series ==
=== Car No. 46 History ===
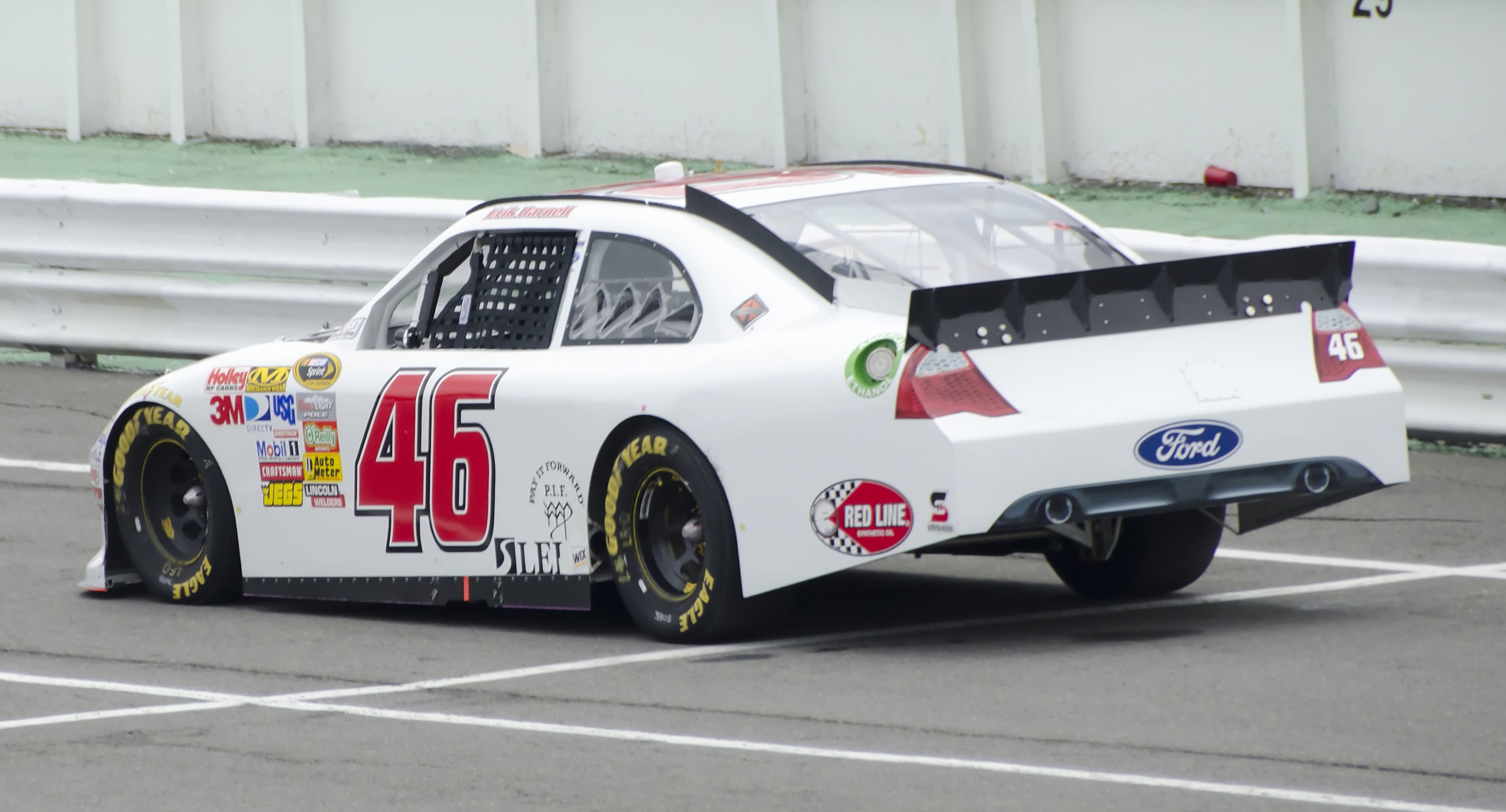
Erik Darnell in the No. 46 at Pocono Raceway in 2011

Dusty Whitney, owner of Whitney Motorsports was involved with K-Automotive Motorsports until 2009, when he left the team and formed his own NASCAR Sprint Cup team. Whitney Motorsports began in 2010 with Rookie of the Year contender Terry Cook in the No. 46 Dodge, who was to run full-time. Cook only managed to qualify for 3 out of the first 10 races, at Bristol and at Phoenix, and left the team following Richmond. He had a best finish of 34th at Phoenix. He was replaced with J. J. Yeley, who would go on to qualify for 9 races in 14 attempts in the No. 46 entry, with a best finish of 19th at Daytona. He also ran 2 races in a second entry for Whitney Motorsports, the No. 81 Dodge. Yeley was replaced by Michael McDowell in the No. 46 entry at Atlanta, and the team would run both Chevrolets and Dodges for the remainder of the season. McDowell would qualify for 7 races in 12 attempts, with a best finish of 35th at Talladega. Sponsors that appeared during the 2010 season included Cash America, Red Line Oil, International Trucking, and Whitney Collision Center, among others. Overall, the No. 46 team made 19 races and finished five.

For 2011, Whitney Motorsports remains a full-time team. It has been announced that Yeley would drive the No. 46 on a full-time basis. After the team failed to make the 2010 Daytona 500, Yeley raced his way into the 2011 event. The team didn't get far, as they blew an engine just 11 laps in and finished 43rd in the race. Yeley qualified for 15 events in the No. 46 car before moving over to Front Row Motorsports, with Bill Elliott driving at Talladega and Andy Pilgrim at Sonoma. Before New Hampshire, the team announced that they would switch manufacturers to Ford with previous Roush Fenway Racing driver Erik Darnell as the driver. Starting at Bristol Scott Speed took over the driving role replacing Erik Darnell and announced they had received sponsorship for Atlanta and Kansas. Speed finished the year with Whitney but left for Max Q Motorsports at year's end.

=== Car No. 46 results ===
NASCAR Sprint Cup Series results
Year	Driver	No.	Make	1	2	3	4	5	6	7	8	9	10	11	12	13	14	15	16	17	18	19	20	21	22	23	24	25	26	27	28	29	30	31	32	33	34	35	36	Owners	Pts
2010	Terry Cook	46	Dodge	DAY; DNQ	CAL; DNQ	LVS; DNQ	ATL; DNQ	BRI; 37	MAR; DNQ	PHO; 34	TEX; DNQ	TAL; DNQ	RCH; 39																											42nd	1493
2010	J. J. Yeley	46	Dodge											DAR; 41	DOV; 37	CLT; 34	POC; 37	MCH; 39	SON; 26	NHA; 39	DAY; 19	CHI; DNQ	IND; DNQ	POC; 38	GLN; DNQ	MCH; DNQ	BRI; DNQ													42nd	1493
2010	Michael McDowell	46	Chevy																									ATL; 39				KAN; 40	CAL; 39	CLT; 39	MAR; DNQ	TAL; 35	TEX; DNQ	PHO; DNQ	HOM; DNQ	42nd	1493
2010	Michael McDowell	46	Dodge																										RCH; DNQ	NHA; 43	DOV; 39									42nd	1493
2011	J. J. Yeley	46	Chevy	DAY; 43	PHO; 37	LVS; 40	BRI; 40	CAL; 41	MAR; 41	TEX; 41		RCH; 43	DAR; 39	DOV; 40	CLT; 42	KAN; 38	POC; 42	MCH; 39		DAY; DNQ	KEN; 40																			40th	156
2011	Bill Elliott	46	Chevy								TAL; 26																													40th	156
2011	Andy Pilgrim	46	Chevy																SON; 26																					40th	156
2011	Erik Darnell	46	Chevy																			NHA; 39																		40th	156
2011	Erik Darnell	46	Ford																				IND; DNQ	POC; 42		MCH; DNQ														40th	156
2011	Brian Simo	46	Ford																						GLN; DNQ															40th	156
2011	Scott Speed	46	Ford																								BRI; 42	ATL; 32	RCH; 43	CHI; 35	NHA; 41	DOV; 42	KAN; 33	CLT; DNQ	TAL; DNQ	MAR; 37	TEX; 39	PHO; 39	HOM; DNQ	40th	156

=== Car No. 81 History ===
Whitney Motorsports first ran the No. 81 at 3 events in 2010 as a Dodge. J. J. Yeley drove the car at Dover and at Martinsville, starting and parking at both events. Terry Labonte drove the car at Phoenix, also starting and parking.

In 2011, the No. 81 qualified for its first race at Kansas. They ran the team for the remainder of the 2011 season in limited races, mainly as support for the 46 team. The No. 81 team ended operations while focused on getting the No. 46 in races.

For 2012, Whitney merged with Phil Parsons Racing to field the No. 98 Ford for Michael McDowell.

=== Car No. 81 results ===
NASCAR Sprint Cup Series results
Year	Driver	No.	Make	1	2	3	4	5	6	7	8	9	10	11	12	13	14	15	16	17	18	19	20	21	22	23	24	25	26	27	28	29	30	31	32	33	34	35	36	Owners	Pts
2010	J. J. Yeley	81	Dodge	DAY	CAL	LVS	ATL	BRI	MAR	PHO	TEX	TAL	RCH	DAR	DOV	CLT	POC	MCH	SON	NHA	DAY	CHI	IND	POC	GLN	MCH	BRI	ATL	RCH	NHA	DOV; 42	KAN	CAL	CLT	MAR; 39	TAL				50th	151
2010	Scott Riggs	81	Chevy																																		TEX; DNQ			50th	151
2010	Terry Labonte	81	Dodge																																			PHO; 41	HOM	50th	151
2011	Scott Riggs	81	Chevy	DAY	PHO	LVS	BRI	CAL	MAR	TEX	TAL	RCH	DAR; DNQ	DOV; DNQ	CLT; DNQ	KAN; 42	POC; 43	MCH; 42			KEN; 42	NHA; DNQ	IND	POC	GLN	MCH	BRI	ATL	RCH	CHI	NHA	DOV	KAN	CLT	TAL	MAR	TEX	PHO	HOM	52nd	18
2011	Brian Simo	81	Ford																SON; 33	DAY																				52nd	18
