= 2011 Pure Michigan 400 =

Race details
- Race 23 of 36 in the 2011 NASCAR Sprint Cup Series
- 2011 Pure Michigan 400 program cover
- Date: August 21, 2011
- Location: Michigan International Speedway in Brooklyn, Michigan
- Course: Permanent racing facility
- Course length: 2.0 miles (3.2 km)
- Distance: 203 laps, 406 mi (653.4 km)
- Scheduled distance: 200 laps, 400 mi (643.7 km)
- Weather: Partly cloudy with a high around 79; wind out of the WSW at 9 mph.
- Average speed: 150.898 miles per hour (242.847 km/h)

Pole position
Driver	Greg Biffle	Roush Fenway Racing
- Time: 37.826

Most laps led
Driver	Greg Biffle	Roush Fenway Racing
- Laps: 86

Winner
No. 18	Kyle Busch	Joe Gibbs Racing

Television in the United States
- Network: ESPN
- Announcers: Allen Bestwick, Dale Jarrett, Andy Petree

The 2011 Pure Michigan 400 was a NASCAR Sprint Cup Series stock car race held on August 21, 2011 at Michigan International Speedway in Brooklyn, Michigan. Contested over 200 laps on the 2 -mile D-shaped oval, it was the 23rd race of the 2011 season. The race was won by Kyle Busch for the Joe Gibbs Racing team. Jimmie Johnson finished second, and Brad Keselowski clinched third.

== Report ==
=== Background ===
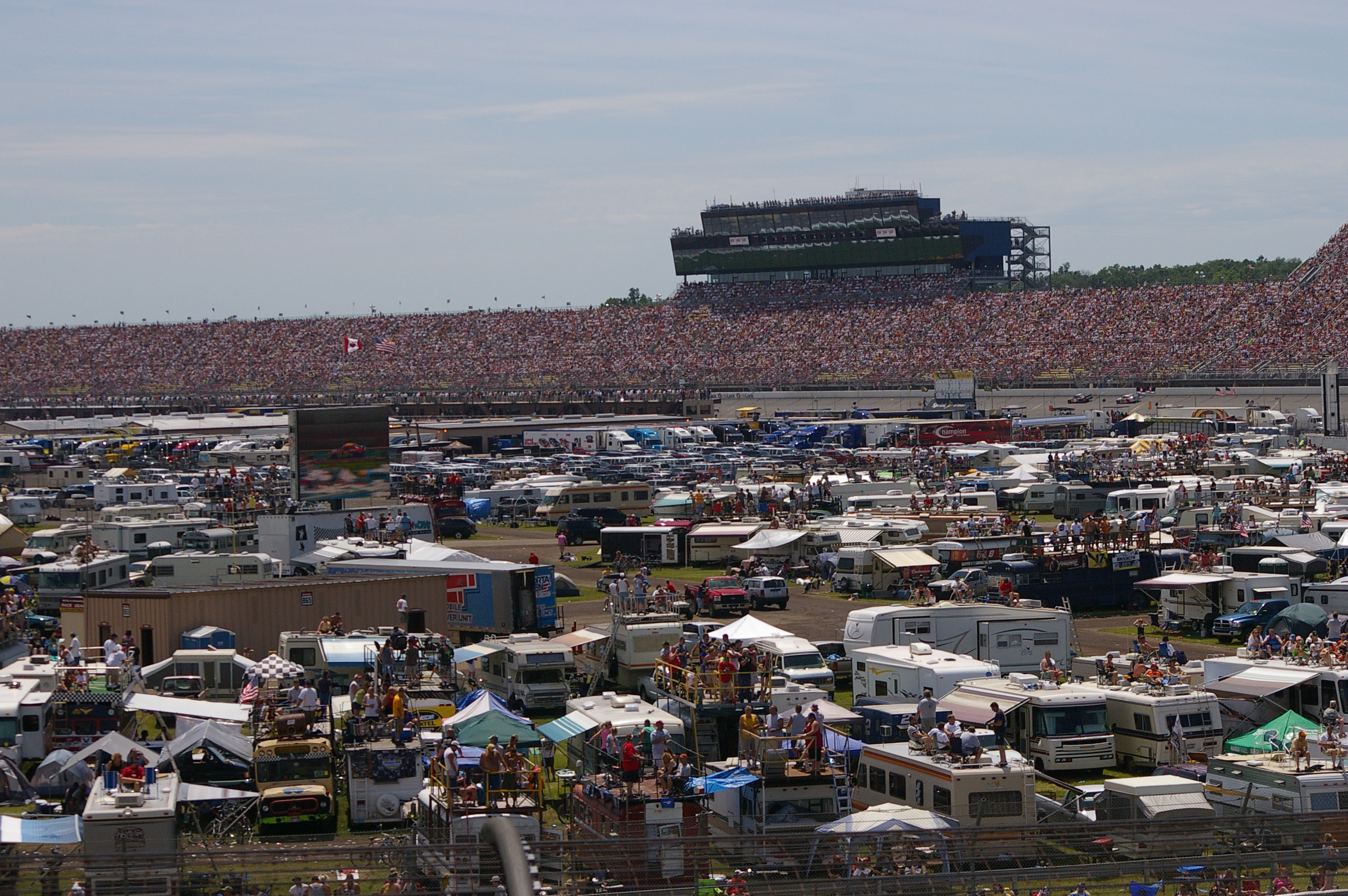
Michigan International Speedway, the race track where the race was held.

Michigan International Speedway is one of six superspeedways to hold NASCAR races; the others are Daytona International Speedway, Auto Club Speedway, Indianapolis Motor Speedway, Pocono Raceway and Talladega Superspeedway. The standard track at Michigan International Speedway is a four-turn superspeedway that is 2 miles (3.2 km) long. The track's turns are banked at eighteen degrees, while the front stretch, the location of the finish line, is banked at twelve degrees. The back stretch, has a five degree banking. Michigan International Speedway can seat up to 119,500 people.

Before the race, Kyle Busch and Carl Edwards were first and second in the Drivers' Championship with 752 points. Jimmie Johnson was third in the Drivers' Championship with 746 points, Kevin Harvick was fourth with 738 points, and Matt Kenseth was in fifth with 724 points. In the Manufacturers' Championship, Chevrolet was leading with 143 points, 15 points ahead of Ford. Toyota, with 118 points, was 23 points ahead of Dodge in the battle for third. Kevin Harvick was the race's defending champion.

=== Practice and qualifying ===
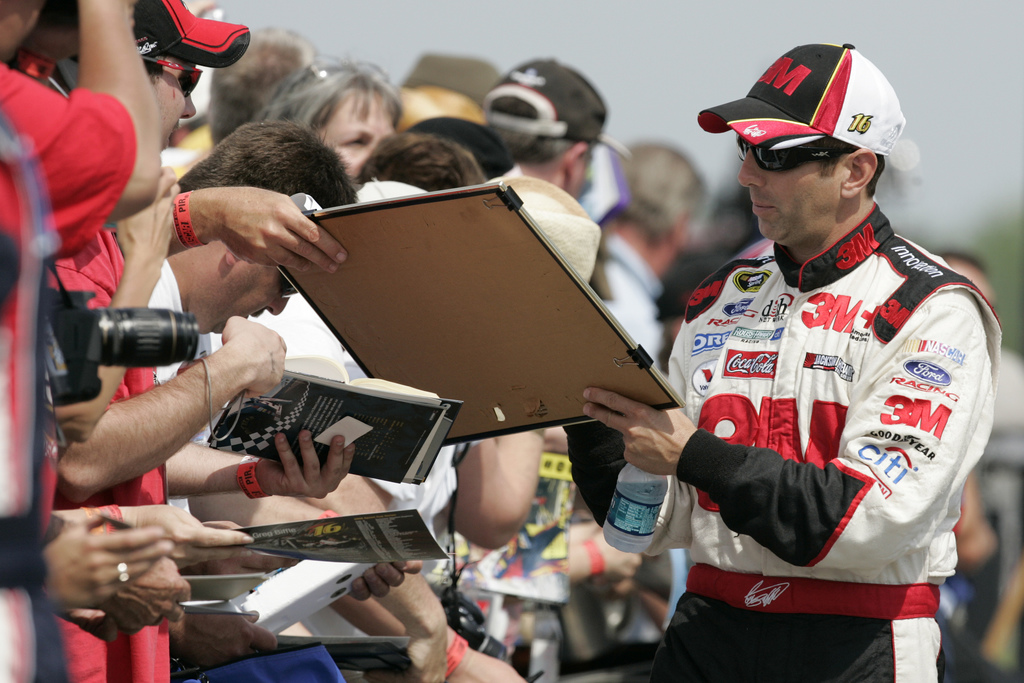
Greg Biffle won the pole position for Roush Fenway Racing

Two practice sessions are scheduled to be held in preparation for the race; one on August 19, 2011 and the other on the following day. The first session was 90 minutes long, while the second will be 110 minutes long. During the first practice session, Matt Kenseth, for the Roush Fenway Racing team, was quickest ahead of Ryan Newman in second and Greg Biffle in the third position. Mark Martin was scored fourth and David Ragan managed fifth. Paul Menard, Jeff Gordon, Jamie McMurray, Brad Keselowski, and Marcos Ambrose rounded out the top ten quickest drivers in the session.

Forty-six cars were entered for qualifying, but only forty-three could qualify for the race because of NASCAR's qualifying procedure. Biffle clinched the sixth pole position of his career, with a time of 37.826 seconds. He was joined on the front row of the grid by Kenseth. Newman qualified third, Denny Hamlin took fourth, and Martin started fifth. Keselowski, Ragan, Dale Earnhardt Jr., Gordon and McMurray rounded out the top ten. The drivers that failed to qualify for the race were Johnny Sauter, Erik Darnell and T. J. Bell. Following the qualifying session, Biffle commented, "We didn't know whether we were going to come here in race or qualifying trim. But we worked on a great qualifying set-up and obviously had good speed today. We'll work on things tomorrow on practice and hopefully have a great car on Sunday."

In the second and final practice, Martin was quickest with a time of 38.371 seconds. Kyle Busch followed in second, ahead of Johnson and Biffle. Gordon was fifth quickest, with a time of 38.452 seconds. Kurt Busch, Kenseth, Newman, Ragan, and Menard rounded out the first ten positions. Afterward, Martin discussed his feelings about the track, "I really, really like running at Michigan, not just because it's so fast, but it's so wide. We can race all over the track. I've been lucky at Michigan, and I've been just plain good. I've gotten a lot of wins there. Last time we raced there, we were pretty good. ... We've got to build on what we learned in that race and try to do even better this time around."

== Results ==
=== Qualifying ===
No.	Driver	Team	Manufacturer	Time	Speed	Grid
16	Greg Biffle	Roush Fenway Racing	Ford	37.826	190.345	1
17	Matt Kenseth	Roush Fenway Racing	Ford	37.853	190.210	2
39	Ryan Newman	Stewart Haas Racing	Chevrolet	37.980	189.574	3
11	Denny Hamlin	Joe Gibbs Racing	Toyota	38.036	189.294	4
5	Mark Martin	Hendrick Motorsports	Chevrolet	38.057	189.190	5
2	Brad Keselowski	Penske Racing	Dodge	38.094	189.006	6
6	David Ragan	Roush Fenway Racing	Ford	38.149	188.734	7
88	Dale Earnhardt Jr.	Hendrick Motorsports	Chevrolet	38.162	188.669	8
24	Jeff Gordon	Hendrick Motorsports	Chevrolet	38.176	188.600	9
1	Jamie McMurray	Earnhardt Ganassi Racing	Chevrolet	38.204	188.462	10
27	Paul Menard	Richard Childress Racing	Chevrolet	38.221	188.378	11
00	David Reutimann	Michael Waltrip Racing	Toyota	38.226	188.354	12
22	Kurt Busch	Penske Racing	Dodge	38.251	188.230	13
4	Kasey Kahne	Red Bull Racing Team	Toyota	38.275	188.112	14
56	Martin Truex Jr.	Michael Waltrip Racing	Toyota	38.280	188.088	15
9	Marcos Ambrose	Richard Petty Motorsports	Ford	38.286	188.058	16
18	Kyle Busch	Joe Gibbs Racing	Toyota	38.297	188.004	17
14	Tony Stewart	Stewart Haas Racing	Chevrolet	38.298	187.999	18
48	Jimmie Johnson	Hendrick Motorsports	Chevrolet	38.344	187.774	19
21	Trevor Bayne	Wood Brothers Racing	Ford	38.347	187.759	20
13	Casey Mears	Germain Racing	Toyota	38.357	187.710	21
99	Carl Edwards	Roush Fenway Racing	Ford	38.364	187.676	22
20	Joey Logano	Joe Gibbs Racing	Toyota	38.369	187.652	23
29	Kevin Harvick	Richard Childress Racing	Chevrolet	38.414	187.432	24
42	Juan Pablo Montoya	Earnhardt Ganassi Racing	Chevrolet	38.504	186.994	25
83	Brian Vickers	Red Bull Racing Team	Toyota	38.519	186.921	26
38	Travis Kvapil	Front Row Motorsports	Ford	38.534	186.848	27
47	Bobby Labonte	JTG Daugherty Racing	Toyota	38.564	186.703	28
43	A. J. Allmendinger	Richard Petty Motorsports	Ford	38.583	186.611	29
78	Regan Smith	Furniture Row Racing	Chevrolet	38.639	186.340	30
55	J. J. Yeley	Front Row Motorsports	Ford	38.650	186.287	31
31	Jeff Burton	Richard Childress Racing	Chevrolet	38.661	186.234	32
51	Landon Cassill	Phoenix Racing	Chevrolet	38.788	185.624	33
36	Dave Blaney	Tommy Baldwin Racing	Chevrolet	38.814	185.500	34
33	Clint Bowyer	Richard Childress Racing	Chevrolet	38.834	185.404	35
30	David Stremme	Inception Motorsports	Chevrolet	38.851	185.323	36
87	Joe Nemechek	NEMCO Motorsports	Toyota	38.864	185.261	37
71	Andy Lally	TRG Motorsports	Ford	38.889	185.142	38
34	David Gilliland	Front Row Motorsports	Ford	38.933	184.933	39
66	Todd Bodine	HP Racing	Toyota	38.953	184.838	40
37	Tony Raines	Max Q Motorsports	Ford	39.229	183.538	41
32	Ken Schrader	FAS Lane Racing	Ford	39.294	183.234	42
60	Mike Skinner	Germain Racing	Toyota	39.298	183.215	43
Failed to Qualify
7	Johnny Sauter	Robby Gordon Motorsports	Dodge	39.384	182.815	
46	Erik Darnell	Whitney Motorsports	Ford	39.547	182.062	
50	T. J. Bell	LTD Powersports	Chevrolet	39.720	181.269	

=== Race results ===
Pos	Grid	Car	Driver	Team	Manufacturer	Laps Run	Points
1	17	18	Kyle Busch	Joe Gibbs Racing	Toyota	203	47
2	19	48	Jimmie Johnson	Hendrick Motorsports	Chevrolet	203	43
3	6	2	Brad Keselowski	Penske Racing	Dodge	203	41
4	5	5	Mark Martin	Hendrick Motorsports	Chevrolet	203	41
5	3	39	Ryan Newman	Stewart Haas Racing	Chevrolet	203	39
6	9	24	Jeff Gordon	Hendrick Motorsports	Chevrolet	203	39
7	14	4	Kasey Kahne	Red Bull Racing Team	Toyota	203	38
8	35	33	Clint Bowyer	Richard Childress Racing	Chevrolet	203	36
9	18	14	Tony Stewart	Stewart Haas Racing	Chevrolet	203	35
10	2	17	Matt Kenseth	Roush Fenway Racing	Ford	203	35
11	29	43	A. J. Allmendinger	Richard Petty Motorsports	Ford	203	33
12	7	6	David Ragan	Roush Fenway Racing	Ford	203	32
13	30	78	Regan Smith	Furniture Row Racing	Chevrolet	203	31
14	8	88	Dale Earnhardt Jr.	Hendrick Motorsports	Chevrolet	203	30
15	28	47	Bobby Labonte	JTG Daugherty Racing	Toyota	203	29
16	26	83	Brian Vickers	Red Bull Racing Team	Toyota	203	28
17	32	31	Jeff Burton	Richard Childress Racing	Chevrolet	203	27
18	12	00	David Reutimann	Michael Waltrip Racing	Toyota	203	26
19	15	56	Martin Truex Jr.	Michael Waltrip Racing	Toyota	203	25
20	1	16	Greg Biffle	Roush Fenway Racing	Ford	203	26
21	23	20	Joey Logano	Joe Gibbs Racing	Toyota	203	23
22	24	29	Kevin Harvick	Richard Childress Racing	Chevrolet	203	22
23	10	1	Jamie McMurray	Earnhardt Ganassi Racing	Chevrolet	203	21
24	20	21	Trevor Bayne	Wood Brothers Racing	Ford	203	0
25	25	42	Juan Pablo Montoya	Earnhardt Ganassi Racing	Chevrolet	203	19
26	11	27	Paul Menard	Richard Childress Racing	Chevrolet	203	18
27	16	9	Marcos Ambrose	Richard Petty Motorsports	Ford	203	17
28	27	38	Travis Kvapil	Front Row Motorsports	Ford	202	0
29	38	71	Andy Lally	TRG Motorsports	Ford	202	16
30	42	32	Ken Schrader	FAS Lane Racing	Ford	202	14
31	33	51	Landon Cassill	Phoenix Racing	Chevrolet	201	0
32	39	34	David Gilliland	Front Row Motorsports	Ford	201	12
33	34	36	Dave Blaney	Tommy Baldwin Racing	Chevrolet	198	11
34	13	22	Kurt Busch	Penske Racing	Dodge	197	10
35	4	11	Denny Hamlin	Joe Gibbs Racing	Toyota	188	9
36	22	99	Carl Edwards	Roush Fenway Racing	Ford	174	8
37	21	13	Casey Mears	Germain Racing	Toyota	32	8
38	41	37	Tony Raines	Max Q Motorsports	Ford	26	6
39	40	66	Todd Bodine	HP Racing	Toyota	21	0
40	36	30	David Stremme	Inception Motorsports	Chevrolet	20	4
41	37	87	Joe Nemechek	NEMCO Motorsports	Toyota	18	0
42	43	60	Mike Skinner	Germain Racing	Toyota	14	0
43	31	55	J. J. Yeley	Front Row Motorsports	Ford	11	1

== Standings after the race ==
Drivers' Championship standings

Pos	Driver	Points
1	Kyle Busch	799
2	Jimmie Johnson	789
3	Kevin Harvick	760
4	Carl Edwards	760
5	Matt Kenseth	759

Manufacturers' Championship standings

Pos	Manufacturer	Points
1	Chevrolet	149
2	Ford	131
3	Toyota	127
4	Dodge	99

- Note: Only the top five positions are included for the driver standings.

Previous race: 2011 Heluva Good! Sour Cream Dips at the Glen	Sprint Cup Series; 2011 season	Next race: 2011 Irwin Tools Night Race
