= 2011 Irwin Tools Night Race =

Race details
- Race 24 of 36 in the 2011 NASCAR Sprint Cup Series
- Date: August 27, 2011
- Location: Bristol Motor Speedway in Bristol, Tennessee
- Course: Permanent racing facility
- Course length: 0.533 miles (0.858 km)
- Distance: 500 laps, 266.5 mi (428.89 km)
- Weather: Temperatures reaching as low as 62.1 °F (16.7 °C); wind speeds up to 15 miles per hour (24 km/h)
- Average speed: 96.753 mph (155.709 km/h)

Pole position
Driver	Ryan Newman	Stewart Haas Racing
- Time: 15.624

Most laps led
Driver	Jeff Gordon	Hendrick Motorsports
- Laps: 206

Winner
No. 2	Brad Keselowski	Penske Racing

Television in the United States
- Network: ABC
- Announcers: Allen Bestwick, Dale Jarrett, Andy Petree

The 2011 Irwin Tools Night Race was a stock car racing competition that took place on August 27, 2011. Held at Bristol Motor Speedway in Bristol, Tennessee, the 500-lap race was the twenty-fourth in the 2011 NASCAR Sprint Cup Series. Brad Keselowski of the Penske Racing team won the race; Martin Truex Jr. finished second and Jeff Gordon finished third.

== Report ==
=== Background ===
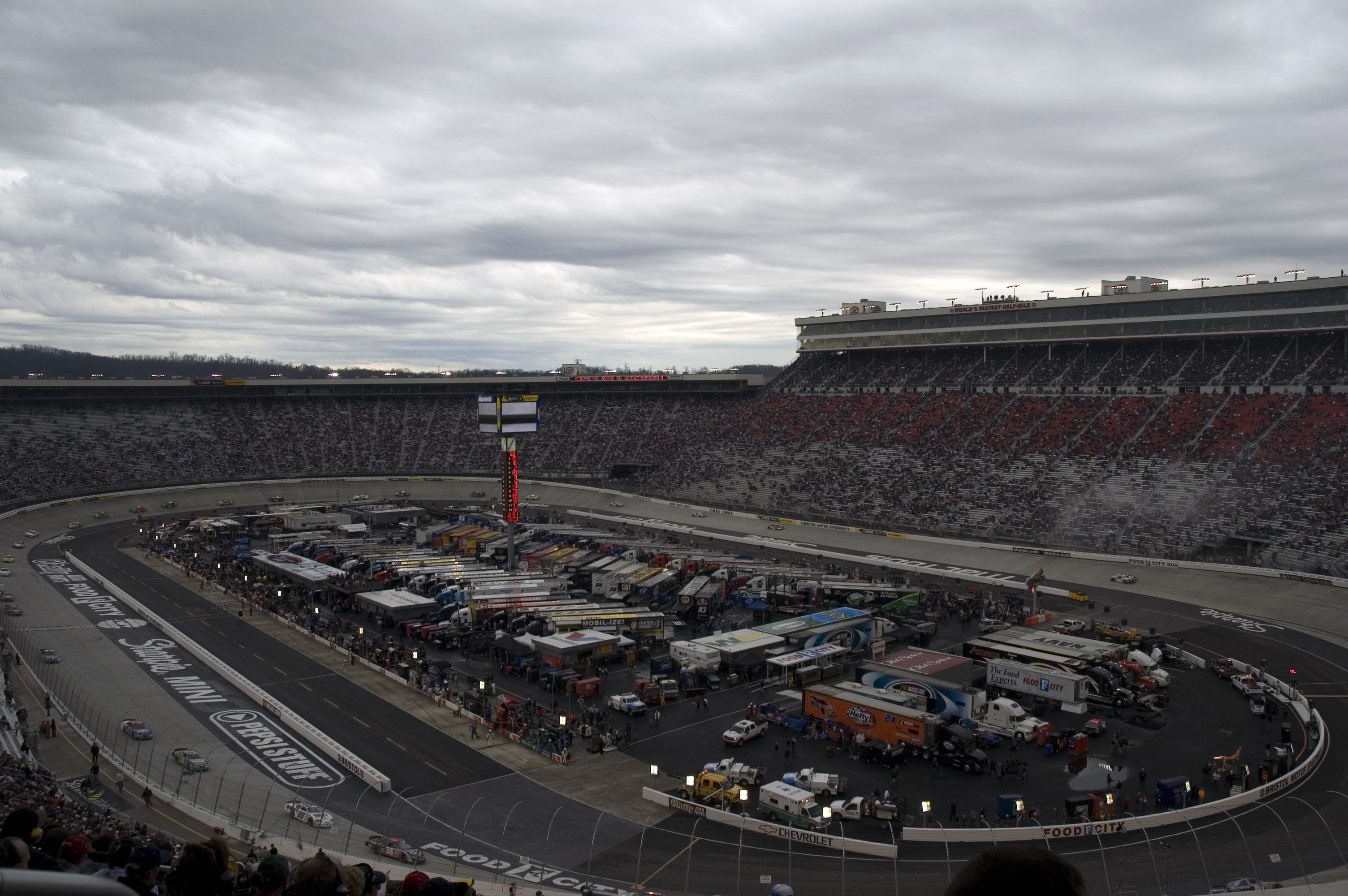
Bristol Motor Speedway, the race track where the race was held.

Bristol Motor Speedway is one of five short tracks to hold NASCAR races; the others are Richmond International Raceway, Dover International Speedway, Martinsville Speedway, and Phoenix International Raceway. The standard track at Bristol Motor Speedway is a four-turn short track oval that is 0.533 miles (0.858 km) long. The track's turns are banked from twenty-four to thirty degrees, while the front stretch, the location of the finish line, is banked from six to ten degrees. The back stretch also has banking from six to ten degrees.

Before the race, Kyle Busch led the Drivers' Championship with 799 points, and Jimmie Johnson stood in second with 789 points. Kevin Harvick was third in the Drivers' Championship with 760 points, and Carl Edwards was fourth with 760 points. Matt Kenseth, Jeff Gordon, Ryan Newman, Kurt Busch, Dale Earnhardt Jr. and Tony Stewart rounded out the first ten positions. Kyle Busch was the race's defending champion.

On August 23, 2011, Toyota debuted the 2012 Toyota Camry at Paramount Studios in Hollywood, California, prompting the Toyota teams to change their headlights, taillights, fog lights, and rear decals.

=== Race ===
The race was televised by ABC in the United States. However, several affiliates including ABC owned-and-operated WABC in New York City, WPVI in Philadelphia and WTVD in Raleigh-Durham pre-empted the race in order to offer continuing coverage of Hurricane Irene, while other ABC affiliates pre-empted this race to air NFL preseason games.

TimesNews sent a photographer to capture some moments from the track.

== Results ==
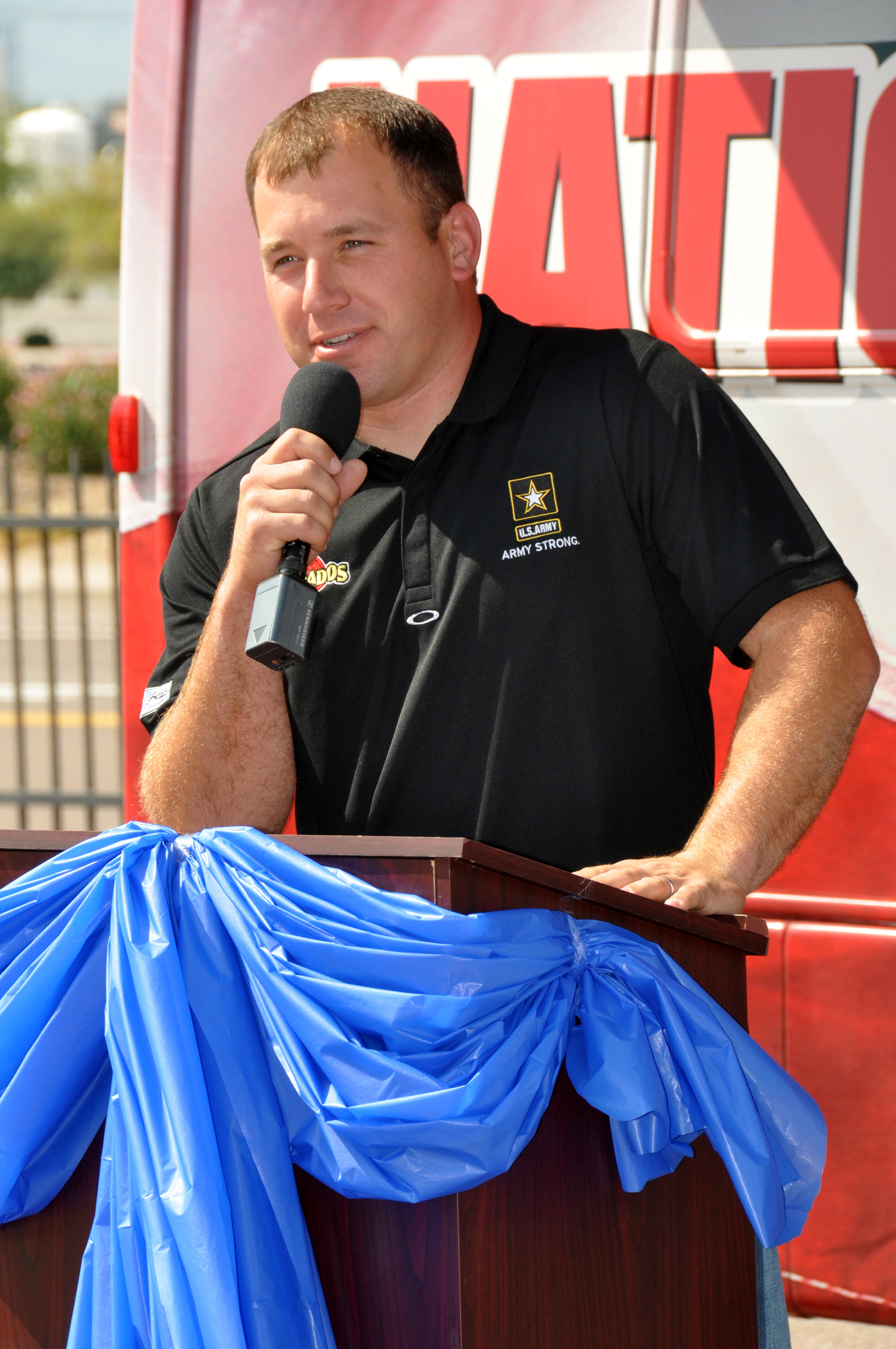
Ryan Newman scored the pole position.

Grid	Car	Driver	Team	Manufacturer	Time	Speed
1	39	Ryan Newman	Stewart–Haas Racing	Chevrolet	15.624	122.811
2	99	Carl Edwards	Roush Fenway Racing	Ford	15.642	122.670
3	17	Matt Kenseth	Roush Fenway Racing	Ford	15.643	122.662
4	24	Jeff Gordon	Hendrick Motorsports	Chevrolet	15.654	122.662
5	5	Mark Martin	Hendrick Motorsports	Chevrolet	15.658	122.544
6	1	Jamie McMurray	Earnhardt Ganassi Racing	Chevrolet	15.659	122.537
7	27	Paul Menard	Richard Childress Racing	Chevrolet	15.676	122.404
8	2	Brad Keselowski	Penske Racing	Dodge	15.683	122.349
9	20	Joey Logano	Joe Gibbs Racing	Toyota	15.688	122.310
10	22	Kurt Busch	Penske Racing	Dodge	15.699	122.224
11	9	Marcos Ambrose	Richard Petty Motorsports	Ford	15.715	122.100
12	78	Regan Smith	Furniture Row Racing	Chevrolet	15.721	122.053
13	48	Jimmie Johnson	Hendrick Motorsports	Chevrolet	15.725	122.022
14	16	Greg Biffle	Roush Fenway Racing	Ford	15.725	122.022
15	29	Kevin Harvick	Richard Childress Racing	Chevrolet	15.727	122.007
16	33	Clint Bowyer	Richard Childress Racing	Chevrolet	15.727	122.007
17	34	David Gilliland	Front Row Motorsports	Ford	15.736	121.937
18	43	A. J. Allmendinger	Richard Petty Motorsports	Ford	15.738	121.921
19	42	Juan Pablo Montoya	Earnhardt Ganassi Racing	Chevrolet	15.755	121.790
20	11	Denny Hamlin	Joe Gibbs Racing	Toyota	15.760	121.751
21	31	Jeff Burton	Richard Childress Racing	Chevrolet	15.765	121.713
22	88	Dale Earnhardt Jr.	Hendrick Motorsports	Chevrolet	15.775	121.635
23	18	Kyle Busch	Joe Gibbs Racing	Toyota	15.785	121.558
24	6	David Ragan	Roush Fenway Racing	Ford	15.787	121.543
25	4	Kasey Kahne	Red Bull Racing Team	Toyota	15.793	121.497
26	83	Brian Vickers	Red Bull Racing Team	Toyota	15.820	121.290
27	56	Martin Truex Jr.	Michael Waltrip Racing	Toyota	15.822	121.274
28	87	Joe Nemechek	NEMCO Motorsports	Toyota	15.835	121.175
29	13	Casey Mears	Germain Racing	Toyota	15.839	121.144
30	47	Bobby Labonte	JTG Daugherty Racing	Toyota	15.843	121.113
31	30	David Stremme	Inception Motorsports	Chevrolet	15.875	120.869
32	66	Michael McDowell	HP Racing	Toyota	15.879	120.839
33	38	Travis Kvapil	Front Row Motorsports	Ford	15.894	120.725
34	00	David Reutimann	Michael Waltrip Racing	Toyota	15.901	120.672
35	36	Dave Blaney	Tommy Baldwin Racing	Chevrolet	15.930	120.452
36	46	Scott Speed	Whitney Motorsports	Ford	15.949	120.308
37	95	David Starr	Leavine Family Racing	Ford	15.970	120.150
38	71	Andy Lally	TRG Motorsports	Ford	16.012	119.835
39	7	Robby Gordon	Robby Gordon Motorsports	Dodge	16.012	119.835
40	51	Mike Bliss	Phoenix Racing	Chevrolet	16.049	119.559
41	32	Terry Labonte	FAS Lane Racing	Ford	16.306	117.674
42	14	Tony Stewart	Stewart–Haas Racing	Chevrolet	16.306	116.397
43	60	Mike Skinner	Germain Racing	Toyota	16.089	119.158
Failed to qualify
44	50	T. J. Bell	LTD Powersports, LLC	Chevrolet	16.103	119.158
45	55	J. J. Yeley	Front Row Motorsports	Ford	16.116	119.062
46	37	Jeff Green	Max Q Motorsports	Ford	16.302	117.703

=== Race ===
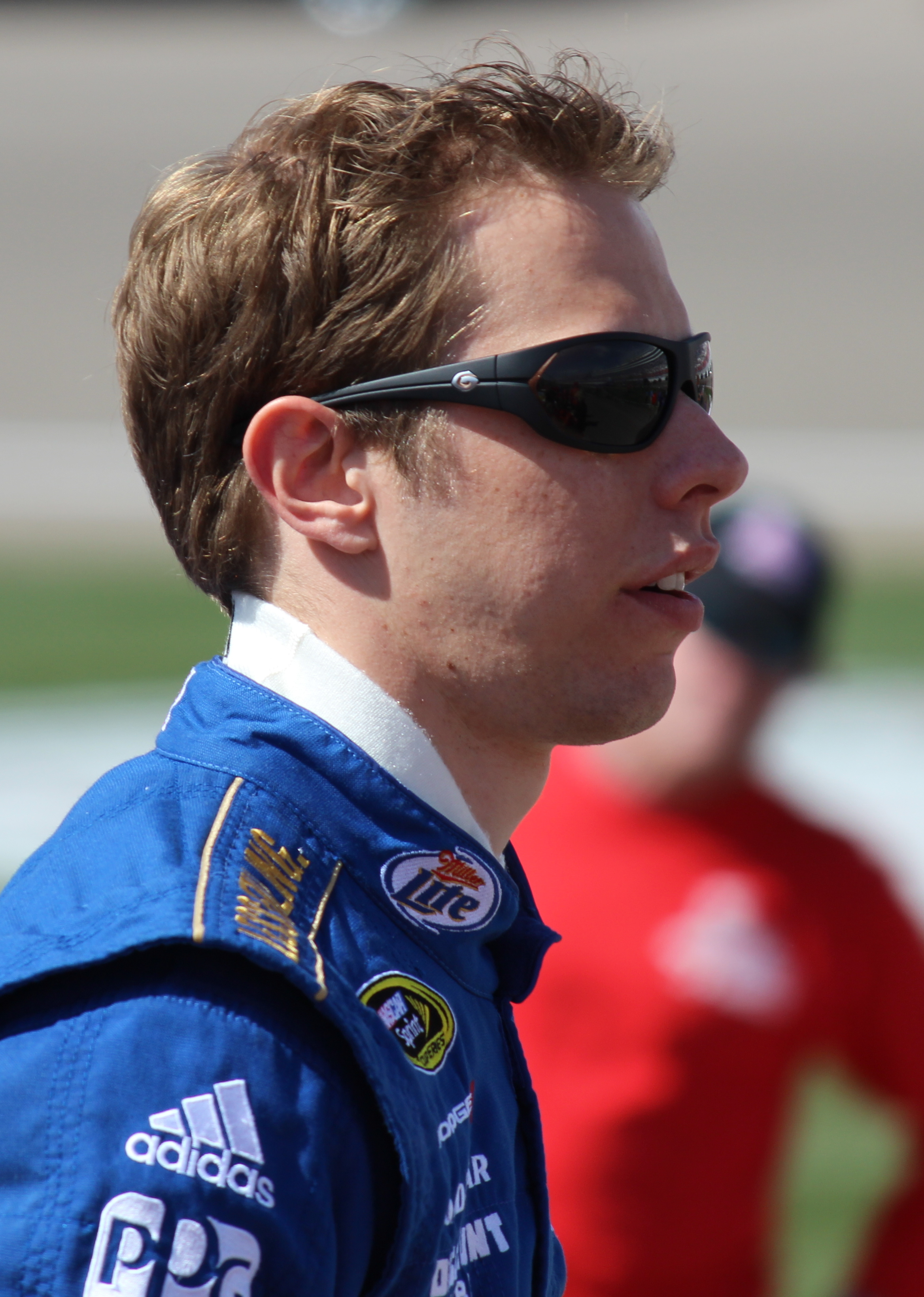
Brad Keselowski won the race.

Pos	Car	Driver	Team	Manufacturer	Laps run	Points
1	2	Brad Keselowski	Penske Racing	Dodge	500	47
2	56	Martin Truex Jr.	Michael Waltrip Racing	Toyota	500	43
3	24	Jeff Gordon	Hendrick Motorsports	Chevrolet	500	43
4	48	Jimmie Johnson	Hendrick Motorsports	Chevrolet	500	41
5	1	Jamie McMurray	Earnhardt Ganassi Racing	Chevrolet	500	40
6	17	Matt Kenseth	Roush Fenway Racing	Ford	500	39
7	11	Denny Hamlin	Joe Gibbs Racing	Toyota	500	37
8	39	Ryan Newman	Stewart–Haas Racing	Chevrolet	500	37
9	99	Carl Edwards	Roush Fenway Racing	Ford	500	35
10	9	Marcos Ambrose	Richard Petty Motorsports	Ford	500	34
11	4	Kasey Kahne	Red Bull Racing Team	Toyota	500	32
12	43	A. J. Allmendinger	Richard Petty Motorsports	Ford	500	32
13	20	Joey Logano	Joe Gibbs Racing	Toyota	500	32
14	18	Kyle Busch	Joe Gibbs Racing	Toyota	500	31
15	31	Jeff Burton	Richard Childress Racing	Chevrolet	500	29
16	88	Dale Earnhardt Jr.	Hendrick Motorsports	Chevrolet	500	28
17	22	Kurt Busch	Penske Racing	Dodge	500	27
18	78	Regan Smith	Furniture Row Racing	Chevrolet	500	26
19	42	Juan Pablo Montoya	Earnhardt Ganassi Racing	Chevrolet	500	25
20	6	David Ragan	Roush Fenway Racing	Ford	500	24
21	83	Brian Vickers	Red Bull Racing Team	Toyota	499	23
22	29	Kevin Harvick	Richard Childress Racing	Chevrolet	499	22
23	13	Casey Mears	Germain Racing	Toyota	499	21
24	34	David Gilliland	Front Row Motorsports	Ford	498	20
25	71	Andy Lally	TRG Motorsports	Ford	498	19
26	33	Clint Bowyer	Richard Childress Racing	Chevrolet	498	18
27	95	David Starr	Leavine Family Racing	Ford	497	0
28	14	Tony Stewart	Stewart–Haas Racing	Chevrolet	497	16
29	51	Mike Bliss	Phoenix Racing	Chevrolet	497	0
30	27	Paul Menard	Richard Childress Racing	Chevrolet	496	14
31	16	Greg Biffle	Roush Fenway Racing	Ford	496	13
32	30	David Stremme	Inception Motorsports	Chevrolet	494	12
33	32	Terry Labonte	FAS Lane Racing	Ford	494	11
34	47	Bobby Labonte	JTG Daugherty Racing	Toyota	471	10
35	36	Dave Blaney	Tommy Baldwin Racing	Chevrolet	457	9
36	00	David Reutimann	Michael Waltrip Racing	Toyota	430	8
37	38	Travis Kvapil	Front Row Motorsports	Ford	371	0
38	5	Mark Martin	Hendrick Motorsports	Chevrolet	363	6
39	66	Michael McDowell	HP Racing	Toyota	49	5
40	87	Joe Nemechek	NEMCO Motorsports	Toyota	42	0
41	60	Mike Skinner	Germain Racing	Toyota	28	0
42	46	Scott Speed	Whitney Motorsports	Ford	28	0
43	7	Robby Gordon	Robby Gordon Motorsports	Dodge	10	1

== Standings after the race ==
Drivers' Championship standings

Pos	Driver	Points
1	Kyle Busch	830
2	Jimmie Johnson	830
3	Matt Kenseth	798
4	Carl Edwards	795
5	Kevin Harvick	782
6	Jeff Gordon	782
7	Ryan Newman	762
8	Kurt Busch	749
9	Dale Earnhardt Jr.	728
10	Tony Stewart	710

Manufacturers' Championship standings

Pos	Manufacturer	Points
1	Chevrolet	153
2	Ford	134
3	Toyota	133
4	Dodge	108

- Note: Only the first ten positions are included for the Drivers' Championship.

Previous race: 2011 Pure Michigan 400	Sprint Cup Series; 2011 season	Next race: 2011 AdvoCare 500
