= 2011 GEICO 400 =

Race details
- Race 27 of 36 in the 2011 NASCAR Sprint Cup Series
- Date: September 19, 2011
- Location: Chicagoland Speedway, Joliet, Illinois
- Course: Permanent racing facility
- Course length: 1.500 miles (2.414 km)
- Distance: 267 laps, 400.5 mi (644.5 km)
- Weather: Few rain showers with a high temperature around 74 °F (23 °C); wind out of the SSE at 10 mph (16 km/h).

Pole position
Driver	Matt Kenseth	Roush Fenway Racing
- Time: 29.469

Most laps led
Driver	Kurt Busch	Penske Racing
- Laps: 46

Winner
No. 14	Tony Stewart	Stewart Haas Racing

Television in the United States
- Network: ESPN
- Announcers: Allen Bestwick, Dale Jarrett, and Andy Petree

The 2011 GEICO 400 was a NASCAR Sprint Cup Series race that was scheduled to be held on September 18, 2011 at Chicagoland Speedway in Joliet, Illinois. However, because of wet track conditions, the race was postponed until September 19, 2011. Contested over 267 laps on the 1.500-mile (2.414 km) asphalt oval, it was the 27th race of the 2011 Sprint Cup Series season, as well as the first race in the ten-race Chase for the Sprint Cup, which ends the season. Tony Stewart of Stewart–Haas Racing won the race, while Kevin Harvick finished second, and Dale Earnhardt Jr. clinched third.

This was Stewart's first win in the 2011 season, and the 40th of his career. The result advanced Stewart to second in the Drivers' Championship, seven points behind Harvick and three ahead of Carl Edwards. Chevrolet maintained its lead in the Manufacturers' Championship, thirty points ahead of Ford and thirty-eight ahead of Toyota, with nine races remaining in the season. A total of 95,000 people attended the race, while 3.68 million watched it on television.

== Report ==
=== Background ===
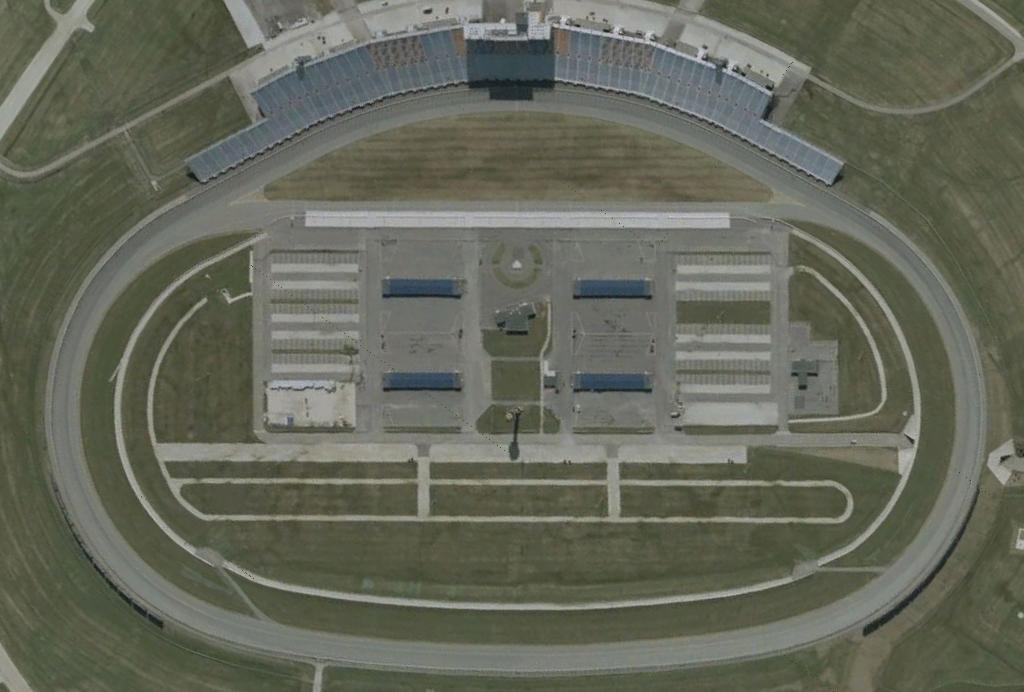
Chicagoland Speedway, the race track where the race was held.

Chicagoland Speedway is one of ten intermediate to hold NASCAR races. The standard track at Chicagoland Speedway is a four-turn tri-oval track that is 1.5 miles (2.4 km) long. The track's turns are each banked at 18 degrees and have a turn width of 55 feet. The racetrack has a grandstand capacity of 75,000.

Before the race, Kyle Busch and Kevin Harvick each led the Drivers' Championship with 2,012 points, with Jeff Gordon in third place with 2,009. Matt Kenseth had a total of 2,006 points, while Carl Edwards and Jimmie Johnson, Kurt Busch, and Ryan Newman were tied for fifth place with 2,003 points. Tony Stewart, Dale Earnhardt Jr., Brad Keselowski, and Denny Hamlin rounded out the first 12 positions with 2,000 points each. In the Manufacturers' Championship, Chevrolet was leading with 171 points, 27 points ahead of Ford. Toyota, with 139 points, was 21 points ahead of Dodge in the battle for third place. David Reutimann was the race's defending champion.

=== Practice and qualifying ===
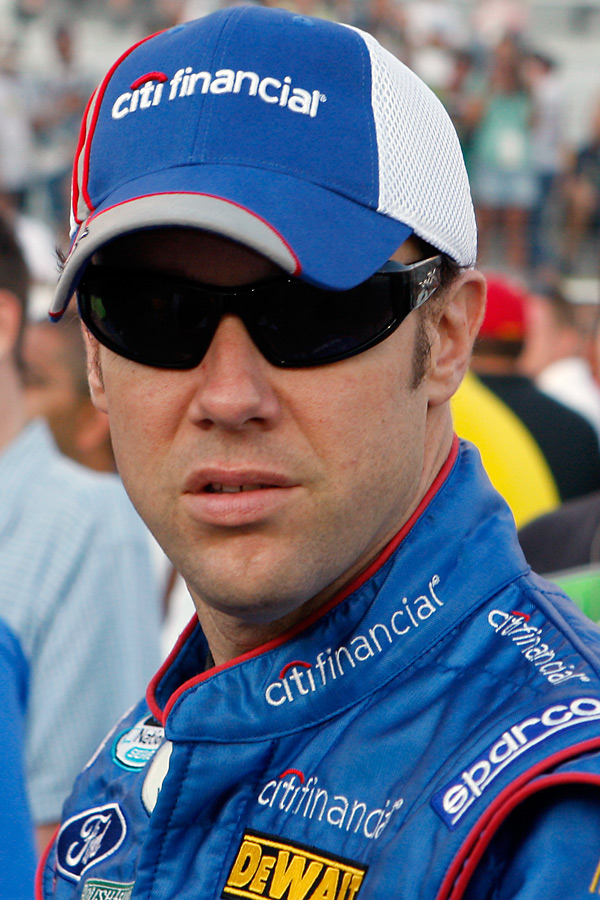
Matt Kenseth won the pole position for the Roush Fenway Racing team

Two practice sessions were held in preparation for the race; both on Friday. The first session lasted 90 minutes long, while the second was 60 minutes long. Reutimann was quickest with a time of 29.486 seconds in the first session, 28 milliseconds faster than Clint Bowyer. Mark Martin was just off Bowyer's pace, followed by Kyle Busch, Trevor Bayne, and Newman. Some Chase for the Sprint Cup participants were not scored high in the first practice, such as Johnson and Hamlin, who were 36th and 40th in the session.

In the second and final practice, Brian Vickers was quickest with a time of 29.304 seconds. Kasey Kahne followed in second, ahead of Kenseth and Paul Menard. Harvick was fifth quickest, with a time of 29.455 seconds. Gordon, Greg Biffle, Johnson, David Stremme, and Edwards rounded out the first ten positions. Kyle Busch, who was third in the first session, could only manage forty-fourth.

Forty-seven cars were entered for qualifying, but only forty-three could race because of NASCAR's qualifying procedure. Kenseth clinched his sixth pole position in the Sprint Cup Series, with a time of 29.469 seconds. He was joined on the front row of the grid by Menard. Kurt Busch qualified third, Newman took fourth, and Edwards started fifth. Johnson, one of the drivers in the Chase for the Sprint Cup, qualified twelfth, while Harvick was scored thirtieth. The four drivers that failed to qualify for the race were Travis Kvapil, David Starr, Stephen Leicht and Mike Skinner (T. J. Bell was gonna enter the race but withdrew).

Once qualifying concluded Kenseth said, "I think starting up front is nice, having a good pit stall. Hopefully, you can get a good start and get a bonus point for leading a lap and try to keep up with the track a little better. We've been qualifying a lot better, if you throw Richmond out, but we've been slipping a little at the end of the race. I'm really happy to be on the pole, but it's just a starting position, and we've got to work really hard on the race, keeping up with our adjustments and that type of thing."

=== Race ===
The race, the twenty-seventh of the season, was scheduled to begin at 2:00 p.m. EDT on September 18, but wet track conditions postponed the race to September 19, 2011 at 12:00 p.m. EDT. The race was televised live in the United States on ESPN. The first caution was the competition caution on lap 31. The next 2 cautions came out for debris on laps 72 and 146. The 4th caution came out on lap 165 when Jamie McMurray blew an engine. On lap 205, the 5th caution came out when J. J. Yeley crashed in turn 3. The final caution came out for debris on lap 214. Towards the end of the race, a majority of cars ran out of fuel. Tony Stewart was able to hold on for his first win of the season.

== Results ==
=== Qualifying ===
Grid	No.	Driver	Team	Manufacturer	Time (s)	Speed
1	17	Matt Kenseth	Roush Fenway Racing	Ford	29.469	183.243 mph (294.901 km/h)
2	27	Paul Menard	Richard Childress Racing	Chevrolet	29.488	183.125 mph (294.711 km/h)
3	22	Kurt Busch	Penske Racing	Dodge	29.503	183.032 mph (294.561 km/h)
4	39	Ryan Newman	Stewart–Haas Racing	Chevrolet	29.507	183.007 mph (294.521 km/h)
5	99	Carl Edwards	Roush Fenway Racing	Ford	29.522	182.914 mph (294.372 km/h)
6	2	Brad Keselowski	Penske Racing	Dodge	29.531	182.859 mph (294.283 km/h)
7	16	Greg Biffle	Roush Fenway Racing	Ford	29.565	182.648 mph (293.943 km/h)
8	83	Brian Vickers	Red Bull Racing	Toyota	29.575	182.587 mph (293.845 km/h)
9	18	Kyle Busch	Joe Gibbs Racing	Toyota	29.615	182.309 mph (293.398 km/h)
10	20	Joey Logano	Joe Gibbs Racing	Toyota	29.620	182.309 mph (293.398 km/h)
11	47	Bobby Labonte	JTG Daugherty Racing	Toyota	29.634	182.223 mph (293.259 km/h)
12	48	Jimmie Johnson	Hendrick Motorsports	Chevrolet	29.667	182.020 mph (292.933 km/h)
13	78	Regan Smith	Furniture Row Racing	Chevrolet	29.690	181.879 mph (292.706 km/h)
14	1	Jamie McMurray	Earnhardt Ganassi Racing	Chevrolet	29.696	181.843 mph (292.648 km/h)
15	6	David Ragan	Roush Fenway Racing	Ford	29.729	181.641 mph (292.323 km/h)
16	42	Juan Pablo Montoya	Earnhardt Ganassi Racing	Chevrolet	29.752	181.500 mph (292.096 km/h)
17	9	Marcos Ambrose	Richard Petty Motorsports	Ford	29.752	181.500 mph (292.096 km/h)
18	43	A. J. Allmendinger	Richard Petty Motorsports	Ford	29.767	181.409 mph (291.949 km/h)
19	88	Dale Earnhardt Jr.	Hendrick Motorsports	Chevrolet	29.784	181.305 mph (291.782 km/h)
20	56	Martin Truex Jr.	Michael Waltrip Racing	Toyota	29.787	181.287 mph (291.753 km/h)
21	33	Clint Bowyer	Richard Childress Racing	Chevrolet	29.790	181.269 mph (291.724 km/h)
22	31	Jeff Burton	Richard Childress Racing	Chevrolet	29.790	181.269 mph (291.724 km/h)
23	24	Jeff Gordon	Hendrick Motorsports	Chevrolet	29.807	181.165 mph (291.557 km/h)
24	4	Kasey Kahne	Red Bull Racing	Toyota	29.812	181.135 mph (291.509 km/h)
25	5	Mark Martin	Hendrick Motorsports	Chevrolet	29.822	181.074 mph (291.410 km/h)
26	14	Tony Stewart	Stewart–Haas Racing	Chevrolet	29.828	181.038 mph (291.352 km/h)
27	11	Denny Hamlin	Joe Gibbs Racing	Toyota	29.879	180.729 mph (290.855 km/h)
28	21	Trevor Bayne	Wood Brothers Racing	Ford	29.894	180.638 mph (290.709 km/h)
29	00	David Reutimann	Michael Waltrip Racing	Toyota	29.900	180.602 mph (290.651 km/h)
30	29	Kevin Harvick	Richard Childress Racing	Chevrolet	29.913	180.524 mph (290.525 km/h)
31	51	Landon Cassill	Phoenix Racing	Chevrolet	29.973	180.162 mph (289.943 km/h)
32	38	J. J. Yeley	Front Row Motorsports	Ford	29.980	180.120 mph (289.875 km/h)
33	66	Michael McDowell	HP Racing	Toyota	29.990	180.060 mph (289.778 km/h)
34	30	David Stremme	Inception Motorsports	Chevrolet	29.991	180.054 mph (289.769 km/h)
35	46	Scott Speed	Whitney Motorsports	Ford	30.000	180.000 mph (289.682 km/h)
36	87	Joe Nemechek	NEMCO Motorsports	Toyota	30.016	179.904 mph (289.527 km/h)
37	7	Robby Gordon	Robby Gordon Motorsports	Dodge	30.039	179.766 mph (289.305 km/h)
38	34	David Gilliland	Front Row Motorsports	Ford	30.196	178.832 mph (287.802 km/h)
39	36	Dave Blaney	Tommy Baldwin Racing	Chevrolet	30.228	178.642 mph (287.496 km/h)
40	71	Andy Lally (R)	TRG Motorsports	Ford	30.238	178.583 mph (287.401 km/h)
41	13	Casey Mears	Germain Racing	Toyota	30.262	178.442 mph (287.175 km/h)
42	32	Mike Bliss	FAS Lane Racing	Ford	30.313	178.141 mph (286.690 km/h)
43	37	Josh Wise	Max Q Motorsports	Ford	30.136	179.188 mph (288.375 km/h)
Failed to Qualify
	55	Travis Kvapil	Front Row Motorsports	Ford		
	95	David Starr	Leavine Family Racing	Ford		
	35	Stephen Leicht	Tommy Baldwin Racing	Chevrolet		
	60	Mike Skinner	Germain Racing	Chevrolet		

=== Race results ===
Pos	Car	Driver	Team	Manufacturer	Laps Run	Points
1	14	Tony Stewart	Stewart–Haas Racing	Chevrolet	267	47
2	29	Kevin Harvick	Richard Childress Racing	Chevrolet	267	42
3	88	Dale Earnhardt Jr.	Hendrick Motorsports	Chevrolet	267	41
4	99	Carl Edwards	Roush Fenway Racing	Ford	267	41
5	2	Brad Keselowski	Penske Racing	Dodge	267	40
6	22	Kurt Busch	Penske Racing	Dodge	267	40
7	33	Clint Bowyer	Richard Childress Racing	Chevrolet	267	37
8	39	Ryan Newman	Stewart–Haas Racing	Chevrolet	267	37
9	5	Mark Martin	Hendrick Motorsports	Chevrolet	267	35
10	48	Jimmie Johnson	Hendrick Motorsports	Chevrolet	267	35
11	6	David Ragan	Roush Fenway Racing	Ford	267	33
12	4	Kasey Kahne	Red Bull Racing	Toyota	267	32
13	83	Brian Vickers	Red Bull Racing	Toyota	267	31
14	42	Juan Pablo Montoya	Earnhardt Ganassi Racing	Chevrolet	267	30
15	31	Jeff Burton	Richard Childress Racing	Chevrolet	267	29
16	20	Joey Logano	Joe Gibbs Racing	Toyota	267	28
17	78	Regan Smith	Furniture Row Racing	Chevrolet	267	27
18	56	Martin Truex Jr.	Michael Waltrip Racing	Toyota	267	27
19	9	Marcos Ambrose	Richard Petty Motorsports	Ford	267	25
20	27	Paul Menard	Richard Childress Racing	Chevrolet	267	24
21	17	Matt Kenseth	Roush Fenway Racing	Ford	266	24
22	18	Kyle Busch	Joe Gibbs Racing	Toyota	266	23
23	21	Trevor Bayne	Wood Brothers Racing	Ford	266	0
24	24	Jeff Gordon	Hendrick Motorsports	Chevrolet	265	20
25	32	Mike Bliss	FAS Lane Racing	Ford	265	0
26	16	Greg Biffle	Roush Fenway Racing	Ford	265	18
27	43	A. J. Allmendinger	Richard Petty Motorsports	Ford	265	17
28	71	Andy Lally (R)	TRG Motorsports	Ford	265	16
29	13	Casey Mears	Germain Racing	Toyota	265	15
30	51	Landon Cassill	Phoenix Racing	Chevrolet	264	0
31	11	Denny Hamlin	Joe Gibbs Racing	Toyota	264	13
32	00	David Reutimann	Michael Waltrip Racing	Toyota	263	12
33	36	Dave Blaney	Tommy Baldwin Racing	Chevrolet	263	11
34	38	J. J. Yeley	Front Row Motorsports	Ford	263	11
35	46	Scott Speed	Whitney Motorsports	Ford	260	0
36	34	David Gilliland	Front Row Motorsports	Ford	259	8
37	47	Bobby Labonte	JTG Daughtery Racing	Toyota	236	7
38	1	Jamie McMurray	Earnhardt Ganassi Racing	Chevrolet	163	6
39	7	Robby Gordon	Robby Gordon Motorsports	Dodge	77	5
40	87	Joe Nemechek	NEMCO Motorsports	Toyota	45	0
41	30	David Stremme	Inception Motorsports	Chevrolet	44	3
42	37	Josh Wise	Max Q Motorsports	Ford	41	0
43	66	Michael McDowell	HP Racing	Toyota	25	1

== Standings after the race ==
Drivers' Championship standings

Pos	Driver	Points
1	Kevin Harvick	2,054
2	Tony Stewart	2,047
3	Carl Edwards	2,044
4	Kurt Busch	2,043
5	Dale Earnhardt Jr.	2,041
6	Brad Keselowski	2,040
7	Ryan Newman	2,040
8	Jimmie Johnson	2,038
9	Kyle Busch	2,035
10	Matt Kenseth	2,030
11	Jeff Gordon	2,029
12	Denny Hamlin	2,013

Manufacturers' Championship standings

Pos	Manufacturer	Points
1	Chevrolet	180
2	Ford	150
3	Toyota	142
4	Dodge	122

- Note: Only the top twelve positions are included for the driver standings.

Previous race: 2011 Wonderful Pistachios 400	Sprint Cup Series; 2011 season	Next race: 2011 Sylvania 300
