= 2011 Crown Royal Presents the Matthew and Daniel Hansen 400 =

Race details
- Race 9 of 36 in the 2011 NASCAR Sprint Cup Series
- Richmond International Speedway
- Date: April 30, 2011
- Official name: Crown Royal Presents the Your Name Here 400
- Location: Richmond International Raceway, Richmond, Virginia
- Course: Permanent racing facility
- Course length: 1.2 km (0.75 miles)
- Distance: 400 laps, 300 mi (483 km)
- Weather: Partly cloudy
- Average speed: 95.28

Pole position
Driver	Juan Pablo Montoya	Earnhardt Ganassi Racing
- Time: 20.989

Most laps led
Driver	Kyle Busch	Joe Gibbs Racing
- Laps: 235

Winner
No. 18	Kyle Busch	Joe Gibbs Racing

Television in the United States
- Network: Fox Broadcasting Company
- Announcers: Mike Joy, Darrell Waltrip and Larry McReynolds

The 2011 Crown Royal Presents the Matthew and Daniel Hansen 400 was a NASCAR Sprint Cup Series stock car race held on April 30, 2011 at Richmond International Raceway in Richmond, Virginia. Contested over 400 laps on the 0.75-mile (1.21 km) asphalt D-oval, it was the ninth race of the 2011 Sprint Cup Series season. The race was won by Kyle Busch for the Joe Gibbs Racing team. Denny Hamlin finished second, and Kasey Kahne clinched third.

== Report ==
=== Background ===
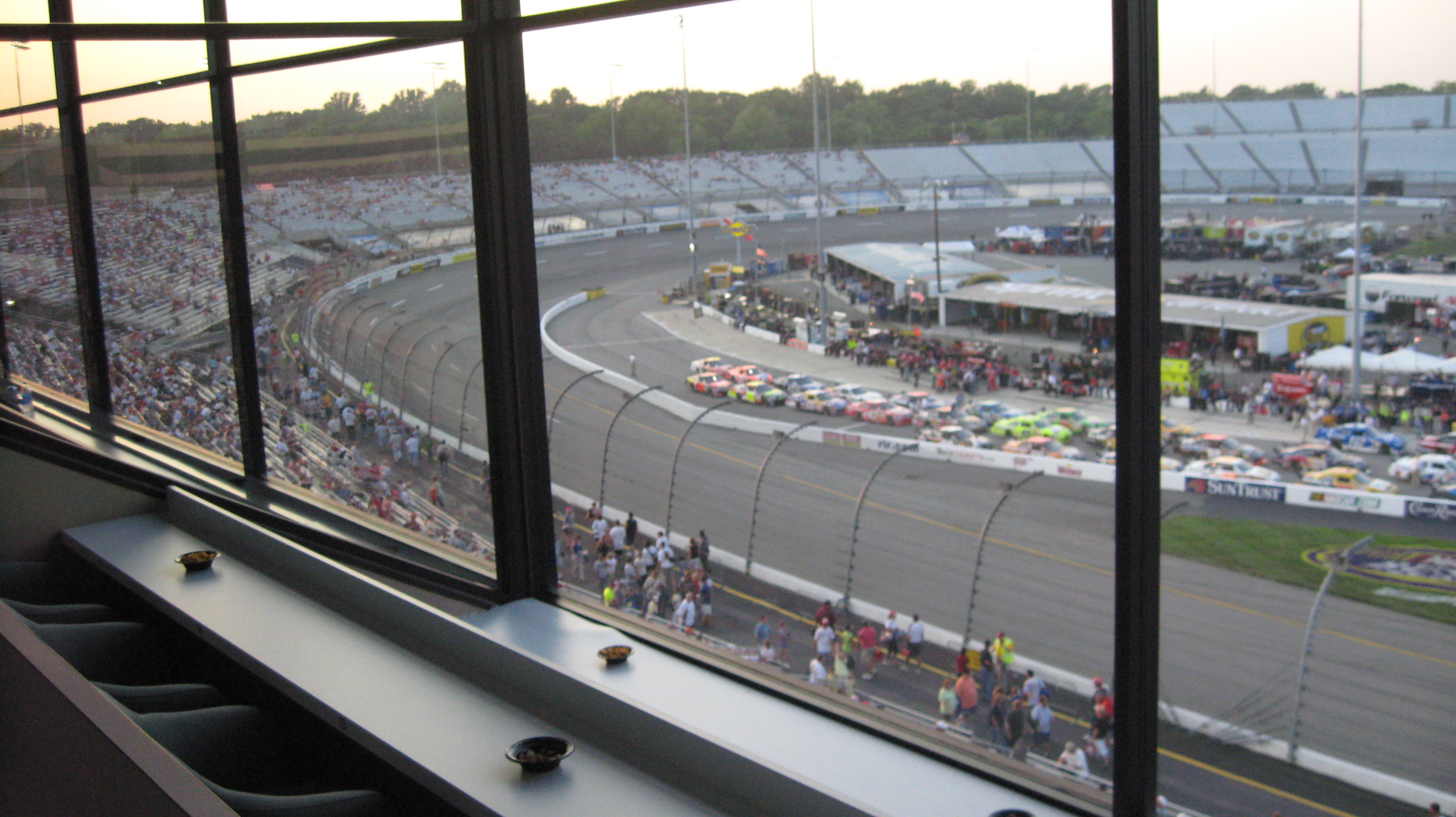
Richmond International Raceway, the race track where the race was held.

Richmond International Raceway is one of five short tracks to hold NASCAR races; the others are Bristol Motor Speedway, Dover International Speedway, Martinsville Speedway, and Phoenix International Raceway. The NASCAR race makes use of the track's standard configuration, a four-turn short track oval that is 0.75 miles (1.21 km) long. The track's turns are banked at fourteen degrees. The front stretch, the location of the finish line, is banked at eight degrees while the back stretch has two degrees of banking. The racetrack has seats for 97,912 spectators.

== Results ==
=== Qualifying ===
No.	Driver	Team	Manufacturer	Time	Speed	Grid
42	Juan Pablo Montoya	Earnhardt Ganassi Racing	Chevrolet	20.989	128.639	1
78	Regan Smith	Furniture Row Racing	Chevrolet	21.031	128.382	2
33	Clint Bowyer	Richard Childress Racing	Chevrolet	21.049	128.272	3
4	Kasey Kahne	Red Bull Racing	Toyota	21.069	128.150	4
5	Mark Martin	Hendrick Motorsports	Chevrolet	21.085	128.053	5
24	Jeff Gordon	Hendrick Motorsports	Chevrolet	21.092	128.011	6
2	Brad Keselowski	Penske Racing	Dodge	21.093	128.011	7
99	Carl Edwards	Roush Fenway Racing	Ford	21.097	128.005	8
20	Joey Logano	Joe Gibbs Racing	Toyota	21.101	127.980	9
27	Paul Menard	Richard Childress Racing	Chevrolet	21.130	127.956	10
11	Denny Hamlin	Joe Gibbs Racing	Toyota	21.150	127.780	11
29	Kevin Harvick	Richard Childress Racing	Chevrolet	21.181	127.660	12
39	Ryan Newman	Stewart Haas Racing	Chevrolet	21.181	127.473	13
47	Bobby Labonte	JTG Daugherty Racing	Toyota	21.184	127.473	14
13	Casey Mears	Germain Racing	Toyota	21.193	127.455	15
30	David Stremme	Inception Motorsports	Chevrolet	21.201	127.401	16
1	Jamie McMurray	Earnhardt Ganassi Racing	Chevrolet	21.204	127.352	17
43	A. J. Allmendinger	Richard Petty Motorsports	Ford	21.204	127.334	18
00	David Reutimann	Michael Waltrip Racing	Toyota	21.208	127.310	19
18	Kyle Busch	Joe Gibbs Racing	Toyota	21.209	127.304	20
56	Martin Truex Jr.	Michael Waltrip Racing	Toyota	21.210	127.298	21
66	Michael McDowell	HP Racing	Toyota	21.210	127.131	22
16	Greg Biffle	Roush Fenway Racing	Ford	21.238	127.095	23
88	Dale Earnhardt Jr.	Hendrick Motorsports	Chevrolet	21.244	127.047	24
31	Jeff Burton	Richard Childress Racing	Chevrolet	21.252	127.023	25
87	Joe Nemechek	NEMCO Motorsports	Toyota	21.256	127.017	26
6	David Ragan	Roush Fenway Racing	Ford	21.257	127.017	27
38	Travis Kvapil	Front Row Motorsports	Ford	21.278	126.892	28
36	Dave Blaney	Tommy Baldwin Racing	Chevrolet	21.279	126.886	29
48	Jimmie Johnson	Hendrick Motorsports	Chevrolet	21.280	126.880	30
14	Tony Stewart	Stewart Haas Racing	Chevrolet	21.308	126.713	31
60	Mike Skinner	Germain Racing	Toyota	21.330	126.582	32
17	Matt Kenseth	Roush Fenway Racing	Ford	21.362	126.393	33
09	Landon Cassill	Phoenix Racing	Chevrolet	21.369	126.351	34
9	Marcos Ambrose	Richard Petty Motorsports	Ford	21.383	126.269	35
22	Kurt Busch	Penske Racing	Dodge	21.393	126.210	36
83	Brian Vickers	Red Bull Racing	Toyota	21.397	126.186	37
32	Ken Schrader	FAS Lane Racing	Ford	21.405	126.139	38
34	David Gilliland	Front Row Motorsports	Ford	21.443	125.915	39
46	J. J. Yeley	Whitney Motorsports	Chevrolet	21.516	125.488	40
37	Tony Raines	Max Q Motorsports	Ford	21.517	125.482	41
71	Andy Lally	TRG Motorsports	Ford	21.629	124.832	42
7	Robby Gordon	Robby Gordon Motorsports	Dodge	21.846	123.592	43
92	Brian Keselowski	K-Automotive Motorsports	Dodge	21.900	123.288	44

== Standings after the race ==
Drivers' Championship standings

Pos	Driver	Points
1	Carl Edwards	335
2	Jimmie Johnson	326
3	Kyle Busch	305
4	Dale Earnhardt Jr.	301
5	Kevin Harvick	300

Manufacturers' Championship standings

Pos	Manufacturer	Points
1	Chevrolet	59
2	Ford	56
3	Toyota	53
4	Dodge	30

- Note: Only the top five positions are included for the driver standings.

Previous race: 2011 Aaron's 499	Sprint Cup Series; 2011 season	Next race: 2011 Showtime Southern 500
