= 2011 Heluva Good! Sour Cream Dips at The Glen =

Race details
- Race 22 of 36 in the 2011 NASCAR Sprint Cup Series
- Date: August 15, 2011
- Location: Watkins Glen International Watkins Glen, New York
- Course: Permanent racing facility
- Course length: 2.454 miles (5.43 km)
- Distance: 90 laps, 220.5 mi (354.9 km)
- Weather: Sunny with a scattered T-storms around 75; wind out of the NNE at 7 mph.

Pole position
Driver	Kyle Busch	Joe Gibbs Racing
- Time: 1:19.767

Most laps led
Driver	Kyle Busch	Joe Gibbs Racing
- Laps: 49

Winner
No. 9	Marcos Ambrose	Richard Petty Motorsports

Television in the United States
- Network: ESPN
- Announcers: Allen Bestwick, Dale Jarrett and Andy Petree

The 2011 Heluva Good! Sour Cream Dips at The Glen is a NASCAR Sprint Cup Series stock car race held on August 15, 2011 at Watkins Glen International in Watkins Glen, New York. Contested over 90 laps, it was the 22nd race of the 2011 season. It was scheduled to be run on August 14, 2011 but was postponed to Monday because of rain. The race was won by Marcos Ambrose of Richard Petty Motorsports, his first career victory in the Cup series and also the first-ever Cup win by an Australian driver. Brad Keselowski finished second and Kyle Busch finished third.

== Race report ==
=== Background ===
Watkins Glen International is one of two road courses to hold NASCAR races, the other being Infineon Raceway. The standard short road course at Watkins Glen International is a 7-turn course that is 2.45 miles (3.94 km) long; the track was modified in 1992, adding the Inner Loop, which lengthened the long course to 3.4 miles (5.5 km) and the short course to the current length of 2.45 miles (3.94 km).

Before the race, Carl Edwards was leading the Drivers' Championship with 720 points, and Jimmie Johnson stood in second with 711 points. Kyle Busch and Kurt Busch followed in third and fourth with 709 and 706 points, six ahead of Kevin Harvick and 38 ahead Jeff Gordon in fifth and sixth. Ryan Newman with 658 was 16 points ahead of Tony Stewart and 19 ahead of Dale Earnhardt Jr. In the Manufacturers' Championship, Chevrolet was first with 140 points, 21 ahead of Ford, and 26 ahead of Toyota. Dodge was placed fourth with 89 points. Juan Pablo Montoya is the race's defending winner from 2010.

=== Race ===
Kyle Busch began leading, but when they entered turn 1 of the last two laps, he turned too far and immediately in second place Brad Keselowski and Marcos Ambrose in third place passed him. Keselowski lead until Marcos Ambrose quickly took the lead in the Inner Loop. Ambrose continued to lead when a major crash occurred at turn 2 in the final lap involving Boris Said, David Ragan, David Reutimann and few other cars that saw Reutimann go airborne and end up on his roof. This accident did not bring out the caution flag, but was brought out soon after when Tony Stewart spun out of control at the Inner Loop and Ambrose won the race.

== Results ==
=== Qualifying ===
Grid	No.	Driver	Team	Manufacturer	Time	Speed
1	18	Kyle Busch	Joe Gibbs Racing	Toyota	1:09.767	126.421
2	43	A. J. Allmendinger	Richard Petty Motorsports	Ford	1:09.977	126.041
3	9	Marcos Ambrose	Richard Petty Motorsports	Ford	1:10.009	125.984
4	48	Jimmie Johnson	Hendrick Motorsports	Chevrolet	1:10.188	125.663
5	42	Juan Pablo Montoya	Earnhardt Ganassi Racing	Chevrolet	1:10.193	125.654
6	39	Ryan Newman	Stewart–Haas Racing	Chevrolet	1:10.383	125.314
7	14	Tony Stewart	Stewart–Haas Racing	Chevrolet	1:10.426	125.238
8	99	Carl Edwards	Roush Fenway Racing	Ford	1:10.446	125.202
9	56	Martin Truex Jr.	Michael Waltrip Racing	Toyota	1:10.578	124.968
10	78	Regan Smith	Furniture Row Racing	Chevrolet	1:10.594	124.940
11	47	Bobby Labonte	JTG Daugherty Racing	Toyota	1:10.608	124.915
12	2	Brad Keselowski	Penske Racing	Dodge	1:10.612	124.908
13	20	Joey Logano	Joe Gibbs Racing	Toyota	1:10.614	124.904
14	1	Jamie McMurray	Earnhardt Ganassi Racing	Chevrolet	1:10.678	124.791
15	51	Boris Said	Phoenix Racing	Chevrolet	1:10.729	124.701
16	6	David Ragan	Roush Fenway Racing	Ford	1:10.815	124.550
17	24	Jeff Gordon	Hendrick Motorsports	Chevrolet	1:10.871	124.451
18	4	Kasey Kahne	Red Bull Racing Team	Toyota	1:11.130	123.998
19	33	Clint Bowyer	Richard Childress Racing	Chevrolet	1:11.213	123.854
20	83	Brian Vickers	Red Bull Racing Team	Toyota	1:11.312	123.682
21	87	Joe Nemechek	NEMCO Motorsports	Toyota	1:11.323	123.663
22	5	Mark Martin	Hendrick Motorsports	Chevrolet	1:11.339	123.635
23	29	Kevin Harvick	Richard Childress Racing	Chevrolet	1:11.407	123.517
24	17	Matt Kenseth	Roush Fenway Racing	Ford	1:11.413	123.507
25	88	Dale Earnhardt Jr.	Hendrick Motorsports	Chevrolet	1:11.431	123.476
26	13	Casey Mears	Germain Racing	Toyota	1:11.443	123.455
27	22	Kurt Busch	Penske Racing	Dodge	1:11.454	123.436
28	16	Greg Biffle	Roush Fenway Racing	Ford	1:11.456	123.433
29	37	Scott Speed	Max Q Motorsports	Ford	1:11.487	123.379
30	55	J. J. Yeley	Front Row Motorsports	Ford	1:11.543	123.283
31	7	Robby Gordon	Robby Gordon Motorsports	Dodge	1:11.605	123.176
32	27	Paul Menard	Richard Childress Racing	Chevrolet	1:11.733	122.956
33	66	Michael McDowell	HP Racing	Toyota	1:11.733	122.956
34	50	T. J. Bell (R)	LTD Powersports, LLC.	Chevrolet	1:11.749	122.929
35	32	Andrew Ranger (R)	FAS Lane Racing	Ford	1:12.075	122.373
36	71	Andy Lally (R)	TRG Motorsports	Ford	1:12.179	122.196
37	60	Mike Skinner	Germain Racing	Toyota	1:12.218	122.130
38	36	Ron Fellows	Tommy Baldwin Racing	Chevrolet	1:12.299	121.993
39	00	David Reutimann	Michael Waltrip Racing	Toyota	1:12.497	121.660
40	31	Jeff Burton	Richard Childress Racing	Chevrolet	1:12.641	121.419
41	34	David Gilliland	Front Row Motorsports	Ford	1:13.293	120.339
42	11	Denny Hamlin	Joe Gibbs Racing	Toyota	0:00.000	000.000
43	38	Terry Labonte	Front Row Motorsports	Ford	1:13.587	119.858
	Failed to Qualify					
	35	Dave Blaney	Tommy Baldwin Racing	Chevrolet	1:12.352	121.904
	46	Brian Simo	Whitney Motorsports	Ford	1:13.937	119.291
	77	P. J. Jones	Robby Gordon Motorsports	Dodge	0:00.000	000.000

=== Race results ===
Pos	No.	Driver	Team	Manufacturer	Laps Run	led	Status	Points
1	9	Marcos Ambrose	Richard Petty Motorsports	Ford	92	21	running	47
2	2	Brad Keselowski	Penske Racing	Dodge	92	2	running	43
3	18	Kyle Busch	Joe Gibbs Racing	Toyota	92	49	running	43
4	56	Martin Truex Jr.	Michael Waltrip Racing	Toyota	92	0	running	40
5	20	Joey Logano	Joe Gibbs Racing	Toyota	92	0	running	39
6	29	Kevin Harvick	Richard Childress Racing	Chevrolet	92	0	running	38
7	42	Juan Pablo Montoya	Earnhardt Ganassi Racing	Chevrolet	92	4	running	38
8	43	A. J. Allmendinger	Richard Petty Motorsports	Ford	92	8	running	37
9	31	Jeff Burton	Richard Childress Racing	Chevrolet	92	0	running	35
10	48	Jimmie Johnson	Hendrick Motorsports	Chevrolet	92	1	running	35
11	33	Clint Bowyer	Richard Childress Racing	Chevrolet	92	1	running	34
12	99	Carl Edwards	Roush Fenway Racing	Ford	92	0	running	32
13	24	Jeff Gordon	Hendrick Motorsports	Chevrolet	92	6	running	32
14	17	Matt Kenseth	Roush Fenway Racing	Ford	92	0	running	30
15	88	Dale Earnhardt Jr.	Hendrick Motorsports	Chevrolet	92	0	running	29
16	39	Ryan Newman	Stewart–Haas Racing	Chevrolet	92	0	running	28
17	1	Jamie McMurray	Earnhardt Ganassi Racing	Chevrolet	92	0	running	27
18	83	Brian Vickers	Red Bull Racing	Toyota	92	0	running	26
19	47	Bobby Labonte	JTG Daugherty Racing	Toyota	92	0	running	25
20	13	Casey Mears	Germain Racing	Toyota	92	0	running	24
21	71	Andy Lally (R)	TRG Motorsports	Ford	92	0	running	23
22	51	Boris Said	Phoenix Racing	Chevrolet	92	0	running	22
23	78	Regan Smith	Furniture Row Racing	Chevrolet	92	0	running	21
24	7	Robby Gordon	Robby Gordon Motorsports	Dodge	92	0	running	20
25	5	Mark Martin	Hendrick Motorsports	Chevrolet	92	0	running	19
26	4	Kasey Kahne	Red Bull Racing	Toyota	92	0	running	18
27	14	Tony Stewart	Stewart–Haas Racing	Chevrolet	92	0	running	17
28	6	David Ragan	Roush Fenway Racing	Ford	91	0	crash	16
29	00	David Reutimann	Michael Waltrip Racing	Toyota	91	0	crash	15
30	36	Ron Fellows	Tommy Baldwin Racing	Chevrolet	91	0	crash	0
31	16	Greg Biffle	Roush Fenway Racing	Ford	91	0	running	13
32	27	Paul Menard	Richard Childress Racing	Chevrolet	85	0	crash	12
33	34	David Gilliland	Front Row Motorsports	Ford	79	0	brakes	11
34	38	Terry Labonte	Front Row Motorsports	Ford	78	0	transmission	10
35	32	Andrew Ranger (R)	FAS Lane Racing	Ford	75	0	transmission	0
36	11	Denny Hamlin	Joe Gibbs Racing	Toyota	65	0	crash	8
37	50	T. J. Bell (R)	LTD Powersports, LLC.	Chevrolet	58	0	power steering	7
38	22	Kurt Busch	Penske Racing	Dodge	48	0	crash	6
39	37	Scott Speed	Max Q Motorsports	Ford	45	0	suspension	0
40	87	Joe Nemechek	NEMCO Motorsports	Toyota	12	0	brakes	0
41	66	Michael McDowell	HP Racing	Toyota	7	0	engine	3
42	55	J. J. Yeley	Front Row Motorsports	Ford	5	0	brakes	2
43	60	Mike Skinner	Germain Racing	Toyota	4	0	brakes	0

== Standings after the race ==
Drivers' Championship standings

Pos	Driver	Points
1	Kyle Busch	752
2	Carl Edwards	752
3	Jimmie Johnson	746
4	Kevin Harvick	738
5	Matt Kenseth	724

Previous race: 2011 Good Sam RV Insurance 500	Sprint Cup Series; 2011 season	Next race: 2011 Pure Michigan 400
