= 2011 Heluva Good! Sour Cream Dips 400 =

Race details
- Race 15 of 36 in the 2011 NASCAR Sprint Cup Series
- 2011 Heluva Good! Sour Cream Dips 400 program cover
- Date: June 19, 2011
- Official name: Heluva Good! Sour Cream Dips 400
- Location: Michigan International Speedway Brooklyn, Michigan
- Course: Permanent racing facility
- Course length: 2.0 miles (3.2 km)
- Distance: 200 laps, 400 mi (643.7 km)
- Average speed: 153.029 miles per hour (246.276 km/h)

Pole position
Driver	Kurt Busch	Penske Racing
- Time: 38.156 seconds

Most laps led
Driver	Greg Biffle	Roush Fenway Racing
- Laps: 68

Winner
No. 11	Denny Hamlin	Joe Gibbs Racing

Television in the United States
- Network: Turner Network Television
- Announcers: Adam Alexander, Wally Dallenbach Jr. and Kyle Petty

The 2011 Heluva Good! Sour Cream Dips 400 was a NASCAR Sprint Cup Series stock car race that was held on June 19, 2011 at Michigan International Speedway in Brooklyn, Michigan. Contested over 200 laps, it was the fifteenth race of the 2011 Sprint Cup Series season. The race was won by Denny Hamlin for the Joe Gibbs Racing team. Matt Kenseth finished second, and Kyle Busch, who started 24th, clinched third.

There were five cautions and 22 lead changes among 12 different drivers throughout the course of the race. The result moved Hamlin to the ninth position in the Drivers' Championship, 77 points behind points leader, Carl Edwards and one point ahead of Tony Stewart. Chevrolet maintained its lead in the Manufacturers' Championship, 13 points ahead of Ford and 21 ahead of Toyota, with twenty-one races remaining in the season. A total of 88,000 people attended the race.

== Results ==
POS	ST	#	DRIVER	SPONSOR / OWNER	CAR	LAPS	MONEY	STATUS	LED	PTS
1	10	11	Denny Hamlin	FedEx Office (Joe Gibbs)	Toyota	200	202200	running	8	47
2	3	17	Matt Kenseth	Crown Royal (Jack Roush)	Ford	200	170436	running	17	43
3	24	18	Kyle Busch	Snickers (Joe Gibbs)	Toyota	200	157516	running	59	42
4	9	27	Paul Menard	Pittsburgh Paints / Menards (Richard Childress)	Chevrolet	200	106475	running	2	41
5	23	99	Carl Edwards	Aflac "Now Hiring" (Jack Roush)	Ford	200	138716	running	30	40
6	13	39	Ryan Newman	U.S. Army 236th Birthday / Bud Moore HOF (Stewart Haas Racing)	Chevrolet	200	130450	running	3	39
7	6	14	Tony Stewart	Office Depot / Mobil 1 (Stewart Haas Racing)	Chevrolet	200	127608	running	0	37
8	27	33	Clint Bowyer	Cheerios / Hamburger Helper (Richard Childress)	Chevrolet	200	129408	running	0	36
9	19	5	Mark Martin	GoDaddy.com (Rick Hendrick)	Chevrolet	200	92900	running	0	35
10	4	83	Brian Vickers	Red Bull (Dietrich Mateschitz)	Toyota	200	111364	running	0	34
11	1	22	Kurt Busch	Shell / Pennzoil (Roger Penske)	Dodge	200	130525	running	9	34
12	12	51	Landon Cassill	Security Benefit / Thank A Teacher Today (James Finch)	Chevrolet	200	81450	running	0	0
13	26	43	A.J. Allmendinger	Best Buy (Richard Petty Motorsports)	Ford	200	120061	running	0	31
14	22	29	Kevin Harvick	Budweiser (Richard Childress)	Chevrolet	200	126086	running	1	31
15	7	16	Greg Biffle	American Red Cross / 3M (Jack Roush)	Ford	200	102325	running	68	31
16	17	21	Trevor Bayne	Motorcraft / Quick Lane Tire & Auto Center (Wood Brothers)	Ford	200	80650	running	0	0
17	31	24	Jeff Gordon	Drive to End Hunger / AARP (Rick Hendrick)	Chevrolet	200	117186	running	0	27
18	30	20	Joey Logano	The Home Depot (Joe Gibbs)	Toyota	200	87850	running	0	26
19	14	1	Jamie McMurray	McDonald's (Earnhardt Ganassi Racing)	Chevrolet	200	114164	running	0	25
20	20	6	David Ragan	UPS "We Love Logistics" (Jack Roush)	Ford	200	88550	running	0	24
21	15	88	Dale Earnhardt Jr.	AMP Energy / National Guard (Rick Hendrick)	Chevrolet	200	86625	running	0	23
22	16	47	Bobby Labonte	RainEater / Advance Auto Parts (JTG-Daugherty Racing)	Toyota	200	104645	running	1	23
23	18	9	Marcos Ambrose	Stanley / DeWalt Tools (Richard Petty Motorsports)	Ford	200	108891	running	0	21
24	33	31	Jeff Burton	Caterpillar (Richard Childress)	Chevrolet	200	85650	running	0	20
25	41	2	Brad Keselowski	Miller Lite (Roger Penske)	Dodge	200	103483	running	0	19
26	11	56	Martin Truex Jr.	NAPA Auto Parts (Michael Waltrip)	Toyota	199	84975	running	0	18
27	21	48	Jimmie Johnson	Lowe's / Kobalt Tools (Rick Hendrick)	Chevrolet	199	127511	running	0	17
28	8	4	Kasey Kahne	Red Bull (Dietrich Mateschitz)	Toyota	199	100683	running	0	16
29	40	34	David Gilliland	Taco Bell (Bob Jenkins)	Ford	199	91908	running	0	15
30	25	42	Juan Pablo Montoya	Cars 2 (Earnhardt Ganassi Racing)	Chevrolet	199	115683	running	0	14
31	28	38	Travis Kvapil	Fellowship of Christian Athletes (Bob Jenkins)	Ford	199	87658	running	0	0
32	35	32	Mike Bliss	Blu Cigs (Frank Stoddard)	Ford	199	84947	running	1	0
33	5	78	Regan Smith	Furniture Row / Denver Mattress (Barney Visser)	Chevrolet	199	99170	running	0	11
34	42	36	Dave Blaney	Golden Corral / GetAuctionAccess.com (Tommy Baldwin Jr.)	Chevrolet	198	73675	running	0	10
35	2	00	David Reutimann	Aaron's Dream Machine (Michael Waltrip)	Toyota	180	101483	running	0	9
36	36	71	Andy Lally	TRG Motorsports (Kevin Buckler)	Ford	155	82025	crash	0	8
37	37	7	Robby Gordon	Speed Energy / Walgreens (Robby Gordon)	Dodge	80	72475	vibration	0	7
38	39	13	Casey Mears	GEICO (Germain Racing)	Toyota	51	72390	electrical	1	7
39	34	46	J.J. Yeley	Red Line Oil (Dusty Whitney)	Chevrolet	47	72340	brakes	0	5
40	29	87	Joe Nemechek	NEMCO Motorsports (Joe Nemechek)	Toyota	44	72300	vibration	0	0
41	32	30	David Stremme	Inception Motorsports (Timothy McSweeney)	Chevrolet	39	72260	clutch	0	3
42	43	81	Scott Riggs	WhitneysCollision.com (Dusty Whitney)	Chevrolet	30	72195	brakes	0	0
43	38	66	Michael McDowell	HP Racing (Phil Parsons)	Toyota	28	71792	electrical	0	1
Failed to qualify or withdrew
POS	NAME	NBR	SPONSOR	OWNER	CAR					
44	Tony Raines	37	Front Row Motorsports	Larry Gunselman	Ford					
45	Brian Keselowski	92	Melling Engine Parts	Bob Keselowski	Chevrolet					
46	Mike Skinner	60	Big Red	Germain Racing	Toyota					
WD	T.J. Bell	50	Green Smoke	Joe Falk	Toyota					

Previous race: 2011 5-hour Energy 500	Sprint Cup Series; 2011 season	Next race: 2011 Toyota/Save Mart 350
