= 2011 Wonderful Pistachios 400 =

Race details
- Race 26 of 36 in the 2011 NASCAR Sprint Cup Series
- Layout of Richmond International Raceway
- Date: September 10, 2011
- Location: Richmond International Raceway, Richmond, Virginia
- Course: Permanent racing facility
- Course length: 1.21 km (0.75 miles)
- Distance: 400 laps, 300 mi (483 km)
- Weather: Temperatures reaching up to 86 °F (30 °C); wind speeds up to 11.1 miles per hour (17.9 km/h)
- Average speed: 89.91 miles per hour (144.70 km/h)

Pole position
Driver	David Reutimann	Michael Waltrip Racing
- Time: 21.196

Most laps led
Driver	Kevin Harvick	Richard Childress Racing
- Laps: 202

Winner
No. 29	Kevin Harvick	Richard Childress Racing

Television in the United States
- Network: ABC
- Announcers: Allen Bestwick, Dale Jarrett and Andy Petree

The 2011 Wonderful Pistachios 400 was a NASCAR Sprint Cup Series stock car race held on September 10, 2011, at Richmond International Raceway in Richmond, Virginia.

Contested over 400 laps, it was the 26th race of the 2011 season and the final race before the 2011 Chase for the Sprint Cup. The race was won by Kevin Harvick for the Richard Childress Racing team. Carl Edwards finished second, and Jeff Gordon clinched third. For only the second time in modern-Sprint Cup history, an event was followed four days after another one. In this case, the AdvoCare 500 was held four days earlier than this event.

== Summary ==
This race was dominated by accidents both involving single cars and multiple cars. Each green flag run averaged almost 20 laps while more than 21% of the race would be held under a caution flag. Kevin Harvick would dominate a good portion of the race while Jeff Gordon had a reasonable chance to win the race between laps 378 and 384. Scott Speed was the last-place finisher of the race due to a crash on lap 7. Despite Paul Menard's awful finish, he was the last driver to finish the race without any mechanical issues.

Juan Pablo Montoya's 15th-place finish and Marcos Ambrose's 21st-place finish were respectable finishes for the token foreigners in the NASCAR Sprint Cup Series. According to the gambling pundits, Kyle Busch was the mostly likely to win prior to the checkered flag while Ambrose, Regan Smith and Bobby Labonte were the three dark horses of the event.

Each finisher was given a different amount of money as his/her individual winnings. These winnings were given out in addition to the driver's weekly salary as a part of a multi-car team. While Kevin Harvick received $256,736 for his valiant effort ($358,860.72 when considering inflation), last-place driver Scott Speed received a meager $66,860 ($93,455.64 when considering inflation).

=== Top ten finishers ===
Pos	Grid	No.	Driver	Manufacturer	Laps	Laps led
1	7	29	Kevin Harvick	Chevrolet	400	202
2	8	99	Carl Edwards	Ford	400	113
3	17	24	Jeff Gordon	Chevrolet	400	7
4	20	6	David Ragan	Ford	400	0
5	11	22	Kurt Busch	Dodge	400	0
6	13	18	Kyle Busch	Toyota	400	0
7	22	14	Tony Stewart	Chevrolet	400	0
8	18	39	Ryan Newman	Chevrolet	400	0
9	28	11	Denny Hamlin	Toyota	400	0
10	4	5	Mark Martin	Chevrolet	400	0

== Timeline ==
- The Voice of Sarge in Toy Story R. Lee Ermey gives the command to start engines
- Start of race: Jamie McMurray led the Racing grid as the green flag was waved
- Lap 20: Jimmie Johnson took over the lead from Jamie McMurray
- Lap 58: Kevin Harvick took over the lead from Jimmie Johnson
- Lap 59: Matt Kenseth took over the lead from Kevin Harvick
- Lap 74: Kevin Harvick took over the lead from Matt Kenseth
- Lap 157: Greg Biffle took over the lead from Kevin Harvick
- Lap 163: Kevin Harvick took over the lead from Greg Biffle
- Lap 202: Carl Edwards took over the lead from Kevin Harvick
- Lap 315: Kevin Harvick took over the lead from Carl Edwards
- Lap 378: Jeff Gordon took over the lead from Kevin Harvick
- Lap 385: Kevin Harvick took over the lead from Jeff Gordon
- Finish: Kevin Harvick was officially declared the winner of the event

== Championship standings ==
Pos	Driver	Points
1	Kyle Busch	2012
2	Kevin Harvick	2012
3	Jeff Gordon	2009
4	Matt Kenseth	2006
5	Jimmie Johnson	2003

Previous race: 2011 AdvoCare 500	Sprint Cup Series; 2011 season	Next race: 2011 GEICO 400
