= 2011 Good Sam RV Insurance 500 =

Race details
- Race 21 of 36 in the 2011 NASCAR Sprint Cup Series
- Date: August 7, 2011
- Location: Pocono Raceway in Long Pond, Pennsylvania
- Course: Permanent racing facility
- Course length: 4.5 km (2.5 miles)
- Distance: 200 laps, 500 mi (804.672 km)

Pole position
Driver	Joey Logano	Joe Gibbs Racing
- Time: 52.310

Most laps led
Driver	Denny Hamlin	Joe Gibbs Racing
- Laps: 65

Winner
No. 2	Brad Keselowski	Penske Racing

Television in the United States
- Network: ESPN
- Announcers: Allen Bestwick, Dale Jarrett and Andy Petree

The 2011 Good Sam RV Insurance 500 was a NASCAR Sprint Cup Series stock car race held on August 7, 2011 at Pocono Raceway in Long Pond, Pennsylvania. Contested over 200 laps on the 2.5-mile (4.0 km) asphalt triangular oval, it was the 21st race of the 2011 Sprint Cup Series season. Brad Keselowski of Penske Racing won the race, while brothers Kyle and Kurt Busch finished second and third respectively.

== Report ==
=== Background ===
Pocono Raceway is one of six superspeedways to hold NASCAR races, the others being Michigan International Speedway, Auto Club Speedway, Daytona International Speedway, Indianapolis Motor Speedway and Talladega Superspeedway. The standard track at Pocono Raceway is a three-turn trianglular-oval track that is 2.5 miles (4.0 km) long. The first turn at the track is banked at 14 degrees, and the second is banked at 8 degrees. The final corner is at 6 degree banking, while the straightaways each have 2 degrees of banking. The racetrack has seats for 76,812 spectators.

Previous race: 2011 Brickyard 400	Sprint Cup Series; 2011 season	Next race: 2011 Heluva Good! Sour Cream Dips at The Glen
