= 2011 5-hour Energy 500 =

Race details
- Race 14 of 36 in the 2011 NASCAR Sprint Cup Series
- Pocono Raceway, where the race was held.
- Date: June 12, 2011
- Location: Pocono Raceway Long Pond, Pennsylvania
- Course: Permanent racing facility
- Course length: 4.0 km (2.5 miles)
- Distance: 200 laps, 500 mi (804.67 km)
- Weather: Scattered thunder-storms with a high around 72; wind out of the ESE at 7 mph.
- Average speed: 145.384 miles per hour (233.973 km/h)

Pole position
Driver	Kurt Busch	Penske Racing
- Time: 52.452

Most laps led
Driver	Denny Hamlin	Joe Gibbs Racing
- Laps: 76

Winner
No. 24	Jeff Gordon	Hendrick Motorsports

Television in the United States
- Network: Turner Network Television
- Announcers: Adam Alexander, Wally Dallenbach Jr. and Kyle Petty

The 2011 5-hour Energy 500 was a NASCAR Sprint Cup Series race held on June 12, 2011, at Pocono Raceway in Long Pond, Pennsylvania. Contested over 200 laps on the 2.5-mile (4.0 km) asphalt tri-oval, it was the 14th race of the 2011 Sprint Cup Series season. The race was won by Jeff Gordon for the Hendrick Motorsports team. Kurt Busch finished second, and Kyle Busch clinched third.

Previous race: 2011 STP 400	Sprint Cup Series; 2011 season	Next race: 2011 Heluva Good! Sour Cream Dips 400
