= 2011 Auto Club 400 =

Fifth race of the 2011 NASCAR Sprint Cup Series

Race details
- Race 5 of 36 in the 2011 NASCAR Sprint Cup Series
- Track map of the speedway at Auto Club Speedway AKA California Speedway
- Date: March 27, 2011
- Location: Auto Club Speedway, Fontana, California
- Course: Permanent racing facility
- Course length: 2 miles (3.2 km)
- Distance: 200 laps, 400 mi (643.7 km)
- Weather: Sunny with a daytime high around 63; wind out of the WSW at 9 mph
- Average speed: 150.848 miles per hour (242.766 km/h)

Pole position
Driver	Juan Pablo Montoya	Earnhardt Ganassi Racing
- Time: 38.992

Most laps led
Driver	Kyle Busch	Joe Gibbs Racing
- Laps: 151

Winner
No. 29	Kevin Harvick	Richard Childress Racing

Television in the United States
- Network: Fox
- Announcers: Mike Joy, Darrell Waltrip and Larry McReynolds

The 2011 Auto Club 400 was a NASCAR Sprint Cup Series race that was held on March 27, 2011 at Auto Club Speedway in Fontana, California. Contested over 200 laps, it was the fifth race of the 2011 season. The race was won by Kevin Harvick for the Richard Childress Racing team. Jimmie Johnson finished second, and Kyle Busch clinched third.

There were four cautions and 18 lead changes among ten different drivers throughout the course of the race. It was Harvick's first win in the 2011 season, and the 15th of his Sprint Cup Series career. The result moved Harvick up to the ninth position in the Drivers' Championship, 30 points behind Carl Edwards in first. Toyota became the leader in the Manufacturers' Championship, tied with Chevrolet, and Ford, with 31 races remaining in the season.

== Report ==
=== Background ===
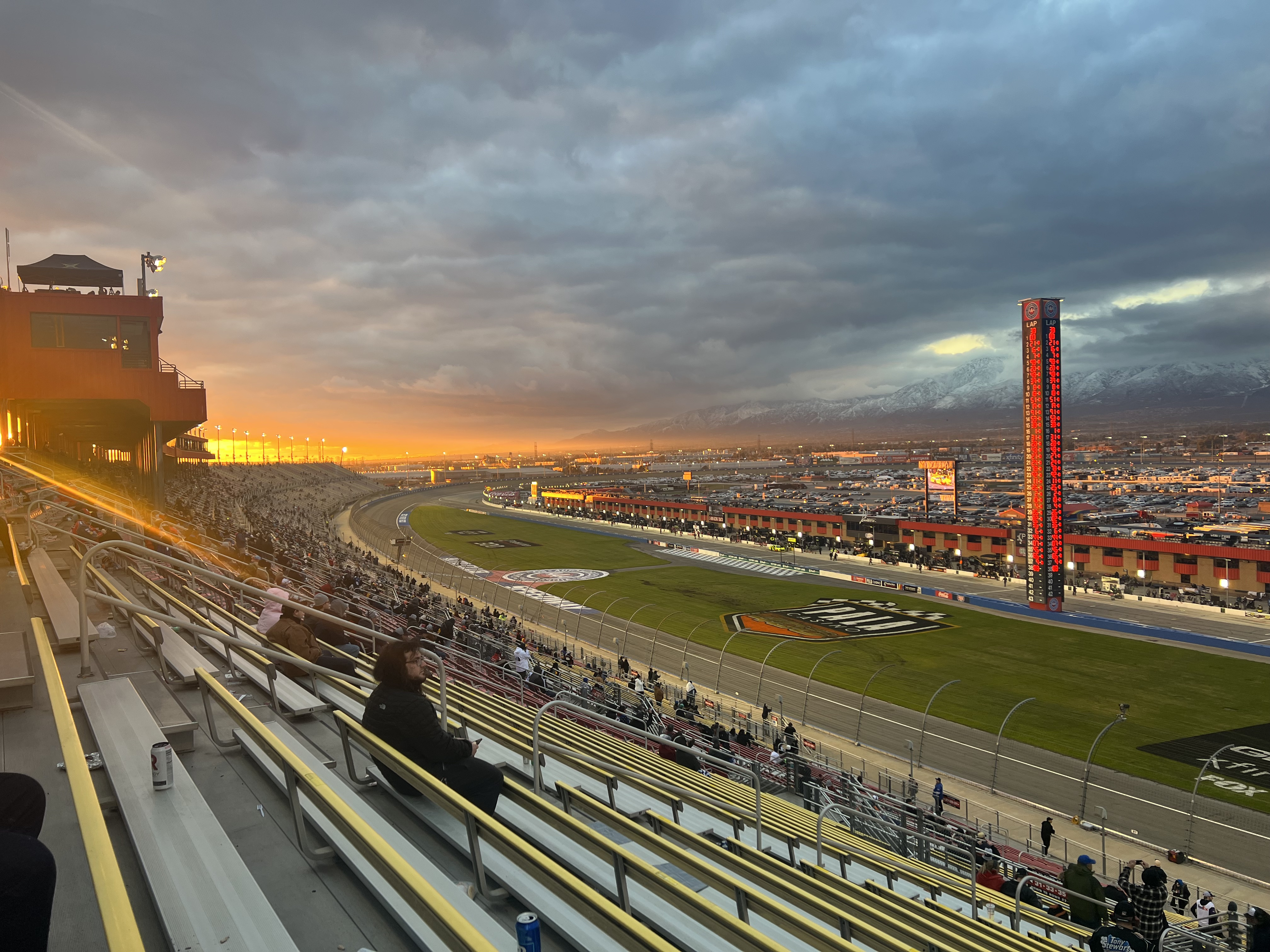
Auto Club Speedway, the track where the race was held

Auto Club Speedway (previously California Speedway) was a superspeedway located in Fontana, California which hosted NASCAR racing annually from 1997 to 2023. The standard track at Auto Club Speedway featured four turns and was 2 miles (3.2 km) long. The track's turns were banked at fourteen degrees, while the front stretch, the location of the finish line, was banked at eleven degrees. The back stretch had 3 degrees of banking. The racetrack had seats for 92,100 spectators.

Before the race, Kurt Busch was leading the Drivers' Championship with 150 points, one point ahead of Carl Edwards in second. Tony Stewart and Ryan Newman followed in third and fourth with 138 points, two ahead of Paul Menard and five ahead of Kyle Busch in fifth and sixth. Jimmie Johnson, with 130, was in the seventh position ahead of Juan Pablo Montoya and Dale Earnhardt Jr. Martin Truex Jr. rounded out the first ten positions with 123 points. In the Manufacturers' Championship, Ford was first with 27 points, two ahead of Toyota and five ahead of Chevrolet. Dodge was in the fourth positions with 14 points. Jimmie Johnson was the race's defending winner from 2010.

=== Practice and qualifying ===
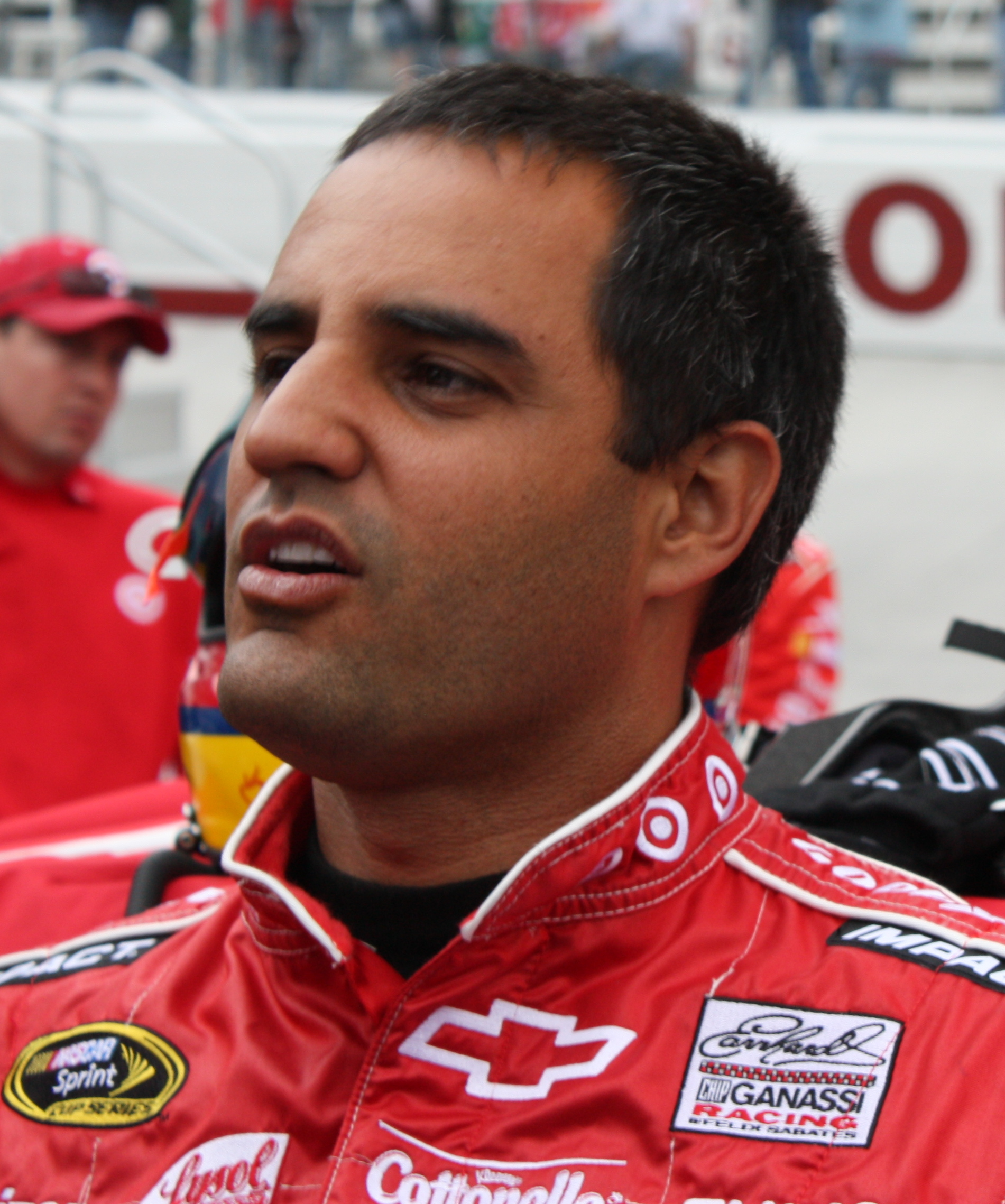
Juan Pablo Montoya scored the pole position.

Three practice sessions were held before the race; the first on Friday, which lasted only 45 minutes after a rain delay. The second and third were both on Saturday afternoon, and lasted 45 and 60 minutes long. David Reutimann was quickest with a time of 38.680 seconds in the first session, 0.263 seconds faster than Denny Hamlin. Greg Biffle was just off Hamlin's pace, followed by Brad Keselowski, Jamie McMurray, and Kasey Kahne. Montoya was seventh, still within a second of Reutimann's time.

Forty-three cars were entered for qualifying. Montoya clinched the sixth pole position of his career, with a time of 38.992 seconds. He was joined on the front row of the grid by Hamlin. Joey Logano qualified third, Regan Smith took fourth, and Stewart started fifth. David Ragan, Jeff Burton, Kyle Busch, Newman and Mark Martin rounded out the top ten. Once the qualifying session concluded, Montoya stated, "It seems like we have a lot of potential this year and it’s pretty exciting. Pit crew is doing an amazing job week in and week out. They are getting so much faster than they were doing before. Just everybody on the team is really excited and pumped up — it’s nice to see."

In the second practice session, Kevin Harvick was fastest with a time of 39.747 seconds, more than six hundredths of a second quicker than second-placed Hamlin. Edwards took third place, ahead of Kyle Busch, Jeff Gordon and Stewart. In the third and final practice, Ragan was quickest with a time of 39.785 seconds. Stewart followed in second, ahead of Edwards and Martin. Gordon remained fifth quickest from the second session, with a time of 39.929 seconds. Kyle Busch, Bowyer, Menard, Trevor Bayne, and Burton rounded out the first ten positions.

=== Race ===
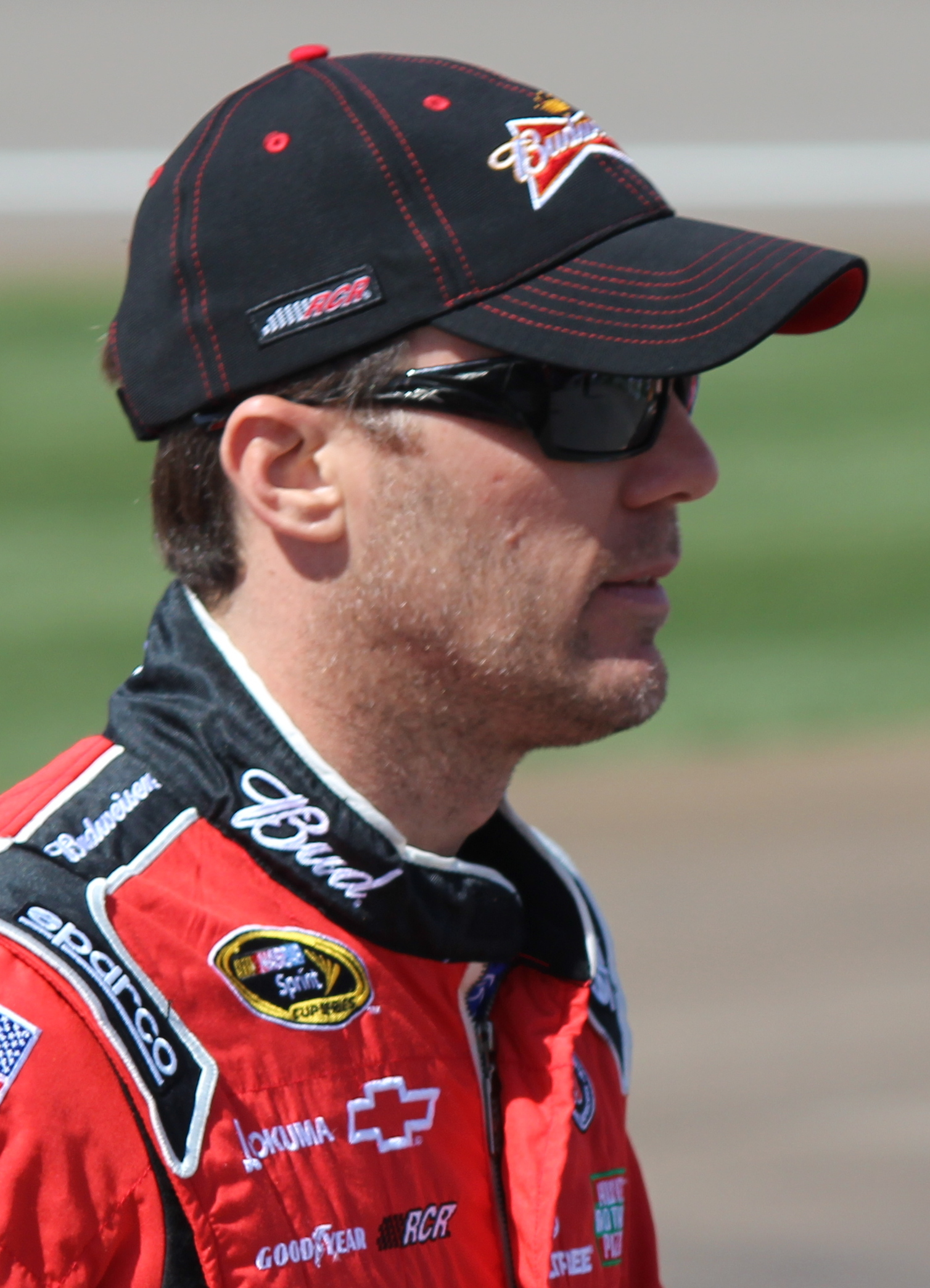
Kevin Harvick won the race.

The race, the fifth in the season, began a 3:00 p.m. EST and was televised live in the United States on Fox. The conditions on the grid were dry before the race with the air temperature at 56 °F (13 °C). Motor Racing Outreach's Jeff Hamilton began pre-race ceremonies, by giving the invocation. Next, Zanzibar Records recording artist Richard Marx performed the national anthem, and Actor Christian Slater gave the command for drivers to start their engines.

== Results ==
=== Qualifying ===
Grid	No.	Driver	Team	Manufacturer	Time	Speed
1	42	Juan Pablo Montoya	Earnhardt Ganassi Racing	Chevrolet	38.992	184.653
2	11	Denny Hamlin	Joe Gibbs Racing	Toyota	39.073	184.270
3	20	Joey Logano	Joe Gibbs Racing	Toyota	39.102	184.134
4	78	Regan Smith	Furniture Row Racing	Chevrolet	39.124	184.030
5	14	Tony Stewart	Stewart Haas Racing	Chevrolet	39.133	183.988
6	6	David Ragan	Roush Fenway Racing	Ford	39.196	183.692
7	31	Jeff Burton	Richard Childress Racing	Chevrolet	39.211	183.622
8	18	Kyle Busch	Joe Gibbs Racing	Toyota	39.241	183.482
9	39	Ryan Newman	Stewart Haas Racing	Chevrolet	39.245	183.463
10	5	Mark Martin	Hendrick Motorsports	Chevrolet	39.248	183.449
11	17	Matt Kenseth	Roush Fenway Racing	Ford	39.257	183.407
12	1	Jamie McMurray	Earnhardt Ganassi Racing	Chevrolet	39.292	183.243
13	9	Marcos Ambrose	Richard Petty Motorsports	Ford	39.317	183.127
14	00	David Reutimann	Michael Waltrip Racing	Toyota	39.320	183.113
15	27	Paul Menard	Richard Childress Racing	Chevrolet	39.355	182.950
16	48	Jimmie Johnson	Hendrick Motorsports	Chevrolet	39.359	182.932
17	33	Clint Bowyer	Richard Childress Racing	Chevrolet	39.366	182.899
18	99	Carl Edwards	Roush Fenway Racing	Ford	39.388	182.797
19	83	Brian Vickers	Red Bull Racing Team	Toyota	39.418	182.658
20	43	A. J. Allmendinger	Richard Petty Motorsports	Ford	39.448	182.519
21	2	Brad Keselowski	Penske Racing	Dodge	39.450	182.510
22	4	Kasey Kahne	Red Bull Racing Team	Chevrolet	39.481	182.366
23	22	Kurt Busch	Penske Racing	Dodge	39.552	182.039
24	29	Kevin Harvick	Richard Childress Racing	Chevrolet	39.580	181.910
25	13	Casey Mears	Germain Racing	Toyota	39.592	181.855
26	56	Martin Truex Jr.	Michael Waltrip Racing	Toyota	39.602	181.809
27	21	Trevor Bayne	Wood Brothers Racing	Ford	39.603	181.804
28	09	Landon Cassill	Phoenix Racing	Chevrolet	39.627	181.694
29	24	Jeff Gordon	Hendrick Motorsports	Chevrolet	39.632	181.671
30	88	Dale Earnhardt Jr.	Hendrick Motorsports	Chevrolet	39.662	181.534
31	36	Dave Blaney	Tommy Baldwin Racing	Chevrolet	39.793	180.936
32	16	Greg Biffle	Roush Fenway Racing	Ford	39.826	180.786
33	66	Michael McDowell	HP Racing	Toyota	39.866	180.605
34	47	Bobby Labonte	JTG Daugherty Racing	Toyota	39.925	180.338
35	7	Robby Gordon	Robby Gordon Motorsports	Dodge	39.938	180.279
36	38	Travis Kvapil	Front Row Motorsports	Ford	39.997	180.014
37	34	David Gilliland	Front Row Motorsports	Ford	40.067	179.699
38	71	Andy Lally	TRG Motorsports	Chevrolet	40.233	178.958
39	32	Ken Schrader	FAS Lane Racing	Ford	40.463	177.940
40	87	Joe Nemechek	NEMCO Motorsports	Toyota	40.527	177.659
41	60	Todd Bodine	Germain Racing	Toyota	40.780	176.557
42	37	Tony Raines	Front Row Motorsports	Ford	40.990	175.653
43	46	J. J. Yeley	Whitney Motorsports	Chevrolet	-	-

=== Race results ===
Pos	Grid	Car	Driver	Team	Manufacturer	Laps Run	Points
1	24	29	Kevin Harvick	Richard Childress Racing	Chevrolet	200	47
2	16	48	Jimmie Johnson	Hendrick Motorsports	Chevrolet	200	43
3	8	18	Kyle Busch	Joe Gibbs Racing	Toyota	200	43
4	11	17	Matt Kenseth	Roush Fenway Racing	Ford	200	40
5	9	39	Ryan Newman	Stewart Haas Racing	Chevrolet	200	40
6	18	99	Carl Edwards	Roush Fenway Racing	Ford	200	38
7	17	33	Clint Bowyer	Richard Childress Racing	Chevrolet	200	38
8	19	83	Brian Vickers	Red Bull Racing Team	Toyota	200	36
9	22	4	Kasey Kahne	Red Bull Racing Team	Toyota	200	35
10	1	42	Juan Pablo Montoya	Earnhardt Ganassi Racing	Chevrolet	200	35
11	32	16	Greg Biffle	Roush Fenway Racing	Ford	200	33
12	30	88	Dale Earnhardt Jr.	Hendrick Motorsports	Chevrolet	200	32
13	5	14	Tony Stewart	Stewart Haas Racing	Chevrolet	200	32
14	20	43	A. J. Allmendinger	Richard Petty Motorsports	Ford	200	30
15	7	31	Jeff Burton	Richard Childress Racing	Chevrolet	200	29
16	15	27	Paul Menard	Richard Childress Racing	Chevrolet	200	28
17	23	22	Kurt Busch	Penske Racing	Dodge	200	27
18	29	24	Jeff Gordon	Hendrick Motorsports	Chevrolet	200	26
19	14	00	David Reutimann	Michael Waltrip Racing	Toyota	200	25
20	10	5	Mark Martin	Hendrick Motorsports	Chevrolet	200	24
21	26	56	Martin Truex Jr.	Michael Waltrip Racing	Toyota	200	24
22	6	6	David Ragan	Roush Fenway Racing	Ford	200	22
23	12	1	Jamie McMurray	Earnhardt Ganassi Racing	Chevrolet	200	21
24	28	09	Landon Cassill	Phoenix Racing	Chevrolet	200	0
25	3	20	Joey Logano	Joe Gibbs Racing	Toyota	200	19
26	21	2	Brad Keselowski	Penske Racing	Dodge	199	18
27	4	78	Regan Smith	Furniture Row Racing	Chevrolet	199	17
28	13	9	Marcos Ambrose	Richard Petty Motorsports	Ford	198	16
29	25	13	Casey Mears	Germain Racing	Toyota	198	15
30	27	21	Trevor Bayne	Wood Brothers Racing	Ford	198	0
31	37	34	David Gilliland	Front Row Motorsports	Ford	198	13
32	38	71	Andy Lally	TRG Motorsports	Chevrolet	198	12
33	39	32	Ken Schrader	FAS Lane Racing	Ford	197	11
34	35	7	Robby Gordon	Robby Gordon Motorsports	Dodge	197	10
35	36	38	Travis Kvapil	Front Row Motorsports	Ford	196	0
36	42	37	Tony Raines	Front Row Motorsports	Ford	190	8
37	31	36	Dave Blaney	Tommy Baldwin Racing	Chevrolet	188	7
38	34	47	Bobby Labonte	JTG Daugherty Racing	Toyota	182	6
39	2	11	Denny Hamlin	Joe Gibbs Racing	Toyota	105	6
40	41	60	Todd Bodine	Germain Racing	Toyota	50	0
41	43	46	J. J. Yeley	Whitney Motorsports	Chevrolet	47	4
42	40	87	Joe Nemechek	NEMCO Motorsports	Toyota	39	0
43	33	66	Michael McDowell	HP Racing	Toyota	32	1

== Standings after the race ==
Drivers' Championship standings

Pos	Driver	Points
1	Carl Edwards	187
2	Ryan Newman	178
3	Kurt Busch	177
4	Kyle Busch	176
5	Jimmie Johnson	173

Manufacturers' Championship standings

Pos	Manufacturer	Points
1	Toyota	31
2	Chevrolet	31
3	Ford	31
4	Dodge	17

- Note: Only the top five positions are included for the driver standings.

Previous race: 2011 Jeff Byrd 500	Sprint Cup Series; 2011 season	Next race: 2011 Goody's Fast Relief 500
