= Robby Gordon Motorsports =

American racing team and constructor

- Owner: Robby Gordon
- Base: Charlotte, North Carolina
- Series: Sprint Cup Series
- Race drivers: Robby Gordon, P. J. Jones, Marcos Ambrose, Matt Crafton, David Gilliland, Bobby Labonte, Kevin Conway, Scott Wimmer, Johnny Sauter, Mike Bliss, Reed Sorenson, Brian Ickler
- Manufacturer: Dodge, Ford, Chevrolet, Toyota

Career
- Debut: Sprint Cup Series: 2005 Auto Club 500 (Fontana); Nationwide Series: 2004 Hershey's Kisses 300 (Daytona)
- Latest race: Sprint Cup Series: 2012 Toyota/Save Mart 350 (Sonoma); Nationwide Series: 2011 NAPA Auto Parts 200 (Montreal)
- Races competed: Total: 291; Sprint Cup Series: 251; Nationwide Series: 45
- Drivers' Championships: Total: 0 Sprint Cup Series: 0 Nationwide Series: 0
- Race victories: Total: 1 Sprint Cup Series: 0 Nationwide Series: 1
- Pole positions: Total: 0 Sprint Cup Series: 0 Nationwide Series: 0

Robby Gordon Motorsports is a motorsports constructor and racing team owned by Robby Gordon. The company was formed in 2005 as a race team for Gordon's NASCAR career, competing in the sport from 2005 to 2012 in the Cup Series and Xfinity Series. While in NASCAR, the team recorded one win (at Richmond in 2004) and 30 top-ten finishes. After 2012, Gordon shut down the team's NASCAR operations. RGM became the constructor of vehicles for Stadium Super Trucks, a new racing series owned by Gordon.

== NASCAR ==
=== 2000 ===
In 2000, after spending the 1999 season racing in Champ Car open-wheel racing, Team Gordon, owned by Robby Gordon, John Menard, and Mike Held, moved to competition in the NASCAR Cup Series; the team struggled and closed after the end of the season, with Gordon moving to drive for Morgan-McClure Motorsports.

=== 2004 ===
In 2004, Gordon and Menard bought back the former Team Menard base in North Carolina. There, Gordon started his own Busch Series team, deciding to run part-time for the 2004 season. He received a primary sponsorship from Fruit of the Loom and his team was assigned the #55. He had a fantastic Busch Series season, which was statistically, Gordon's best Busch Season of his career; he picked up over 15 top-ten finishes. He won one race that September, at Richmond in his self-owned No. 55 Fruit of the Loom/Menards/Mapei Chevrolet gaining public notice to Robby Gordon Motorsports. Like in the Cup Series, his first win was on an oval track rather than a road course. By season's end, Gordon parted ways with Richard Childress Racing, his Cup team at the time, in favor of bringing his new team up to the Cup Series.

=== 2005 ===
Gordon purchased the defunct Ultra Motorsports for the 2005 season with Menard as a business partner and former owner Jim Smith being listed as owner for provisional points. In 2005, Menard built engines for RGM with little success, as the engines were prone to failure. This led RGM to switch engine suppliers and lease from Dale Earnhardt, Inc. At the same time, RGM got into a sponsorship dispute with Fruit of the Loom, leading to the dissolving of their partnership and a lawsuit embroiled afterwards. The suit was settled out of court in 2006.

Robby Gordon found primary sponsorship in Jim Beam Whiskey, which became the pivotal sponsor; he also found minor sponsors in Menard's, Red Bull Energy Drink, Mapei, and Camping World RV's. While running a full-time Cup program, Robby Gordon and the team chose to cut back on their Busch Series starts. During their 2005 Busch Series season, Gordon's #55 team, mostly sponsored by Red Bull Energy Drink, finished with two top-ten finishes, including a narrow runner-up finish at Watkins Glen. For the inaugural Busch Series race in Mexico City, Gordon qualified 2nd in his #83 Red Bull Chevrolet, before suffering engine failure after charging from the back of the field towards the top-ten.

However, his 2005 Cup Series campaign was disappointing. In 2005 Gordon recorded only two top tens in total for the season. Gordon came close to winning or ending up in the top ten in the 2005 Sylvania 300 but a caution had ruined his day. After Joe Nemechek spun with Mike Bliss, Gordon had made a pass on Michael Waltrip. After the caution was reviewed for Bliss and Nemechek's crash, the camera turned to see that Gordon was wrecked severely. NASCAR heard from Gordon that Waltrip had spun him just as the caution flew seconds after he had passed Waltrip. Gordon was so furious that he first tried to turn his car around to wait for Waltrip to come back around and then crash him; but when his car failed to move Gordon tried to pull backward in front of Waltrip but when this attempt at revenge failed also, Gordon finally climbed out of his car and tossed his helmet at Waltrip's hood. In reply Waltrip on the radio mockingly repeated Gordon's own words Gordon said in 2004 in one race at the same track "He just threw a helmet on my car...well that is just rude. It was his fault." Then on a radio minutes later to a reporter Gordon said "You know, everybody thinks Michael is this good guy. He is not the good guy he like acts he is. The caution was out, and he wrecked me, and he is a piece of shit."

To exchange peace offerings between each other, RGM permitted Gordon and Waltrip to sign the mostly unscathed helmet and auction it with the purpose of donating to the Hurricane Katrina victims in 2005. The helmet was bought by GoldenPalace.com for $51,000 and the helmet remains on display in the headquarters of GoldenPalace.

=== 2006–2007 ===
In 2006, Gordon came near to another NBS victory. At Watkins Glen in late summer, Gordon led ten laps but was passed by Kurt Busch with about 15 laps left. Busch held off Gordon for the rest of the race. On the final lap, Gordon charged at Busch and managed to nearly push Kurt into a mistake on the straightaway. Gordon tried to pass Busch in the inner loop, but he did not have enough momentum. Gordon then got side-by-side with Busch and their cars locked together. After a struggle, Kurt held onto the lead to eventually win the race. In victory lane, Busch thanked Gordon for a good fight, saying that it "reminded him of his fun fight for victory with Ricky Craven at Darlington in 2003."

In October 2006, Robby Gordon Motorsports signed with Ford Racing, running the Ford Fusion in 2007. The car was sponsored by Jim Beam, Mapei, Camping World, and Monster Energy Drink. RGM used Roush/Yates engines.

In 2007, Robby Gordon Motorsports had a breakout year. In the Nextel Cup series, Gordon performed really well. He was about to end up in 25th place at the Daytona 500, but because of a last lap accident he ended up finishing in 15th place. He finished 17th at Las Vegas and qualified second at Sonoma. There, Gordon got by Jamie McMurray on lap one and had a 35-lap streak of domination. However, because of pit stop shuffling, Gordon finished in 16th place, after having the dominant car.

In late 2007, Gordon had one of his most controversial and bizarre NASCAR finishes ever. Driving in his own No. 55 Camping World-sponsored car in NASCAR's inaugural race at Circuit Gilles Villeneuve, Gordon passed the then-leader Marcos Ambrose for first place but was turned around by Ambrose in turn three just after the caution flew for a separate incident in turn one. During the caution period, Gordon refired his car and went back up front. Gordon argued that he should have been the race leader, but NASCAR ruled that because he failed to maintain a particular speed, he was dropped to 13th for the final restart. Gordon refused to restart in that position and was black-flagged. In turn 1, Gordon intentionally wrecked Ambrose, and was disqualified, his final two laps not being scored. Gordon went on to finish 1st after ignoring repeated black-flags, and then celebrated on track as if he won the event. Upon further review, former RCR teammate Kevin Harvick was declared the winner and Gordon was visibly upset post-race, protesting that he had indeed won the race. NASCAR responded by parking Gordon for the next morning's Cup race at Pocono. Soon afterwards, Gordon apologized for his actions, but maintained that it was a poor call.

To make amends with Ambrose who had ended up in 7th place after refiring his car to finish; Gordon gave Ambrose his second RGM car the No. 77 Menards car for the 2007 Centurion Boats at the Glen, in an attempt to make his Sprint Cup debut. For this race, Ambrose was sponsored by a mixture of RGM sponsors such as Jim Beam and Camping World, plus the sponsors of his Busch team JTG Daugherty Racing such as Kingsford and Clorox. Ambrose, however, did not qualify because it was rained out.

After the disappointing weekend at both Montreal and Pocono, Gordon redeemed himself from his penalty by driving from 29th spot at Watkins Glen to finish in 5th place. With four laps left, Gordon had the fastest car, but Ron Fellows was able to hold him off and he couldn't break into the top four.

=== 2008 ===
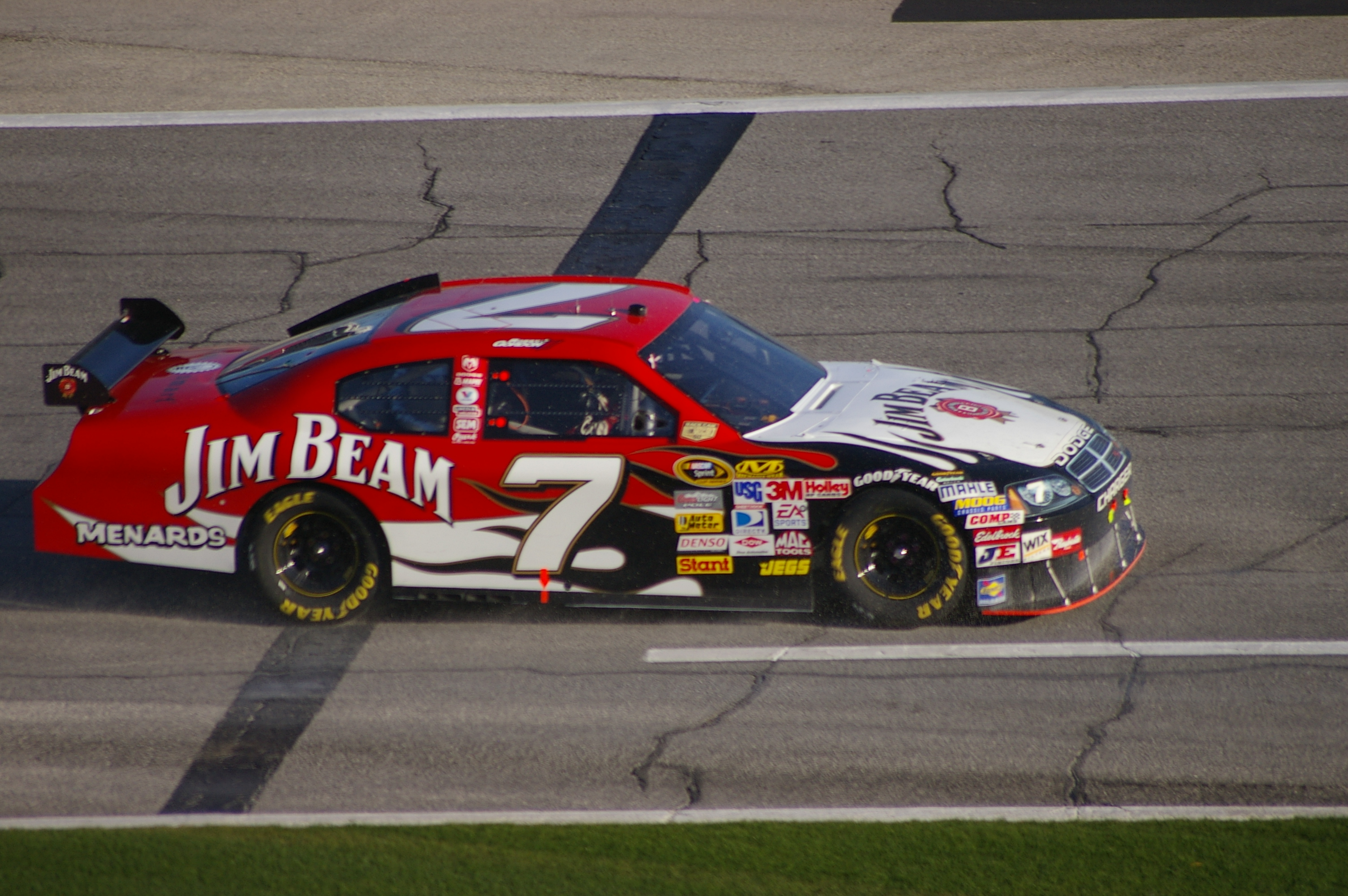
Robby Gordon's No. 7 Dodge at Daytona in 2008

In January 2008, Gordon hired a new crew chief, Frank Kerr. During preseason testing prior to the 2008 Daytona 500, RGM switched to the Dodge Charger, using Evernham engines. However, due to the sudden switch, GEM could only give Gordon a Dodge Charger nose for testing. Gordon received the correct nose, a Dodge Avenger nose with Charger decals, before the Daytona 500, and finished 8th at Daytona. However, he was given a 100-point penalty from NASCAR along with a $100,000 fine, while Kerr was suspended six races. Fans and sponsor Jim Beam started a "Rally for Robby" campaign, protesting the penalty, although it was standard in most 2007 COT penalties. On March 5, the National Stock Car Racing Commission reinstated the No. 7's driver's and owner's points and Kerr's suspension was retracted, though he remained on probation and the fine increased to $150,000. Kerr would depart the team shortly thereafter, ending his RGM tenure at ten races, and was replaced by Walter Giles and Kirk Almquist.

Late in the year, GEM and RGM were embroiled in a lawsuit, concerning a potential merger between the two organizations. The suit was eventually dropped, but in the process the partnership was dissolved and Gordon switched to Penske Racing engines.

=== 2009 ===
For 2009, Gordon made another manufacturer switch, the team's fourth in as many years, and fielded Toyota's for the season. Gordon ran 35 of the 36 races, with David Gilliland running at Richmond, finishing 24th. Robby Gordon's best finish in 2009 came at Charlotte in the Coca-Cola 600. Under caution, Gordon initially stayed out, with the race possibly being declared official due to heavy rain. He chose to pit, but David Reutimann and Ryan Newman made last second decisions to stay out. When the race was soon after called official, Robby Gordon ended up in third place. Had David Reutimann and Ryan Newman pitted before the red flag, Robby Gordon would have won the race. This was still Gordon's best finish on an oval with his own team.

The team ended the season 34th in owners points. Sponsors included Jim Beam, Menards, Camping World, and Freightliner, among others.

A second RGM team, the No. 04, debuted for the first time in 2009, with P. J. Jones finishing 43rd at Infineon and 41st at Watkins Glen. David Gilliland attempted the race at Kansas, but failed to qualify for the event.

=== 2010 ===
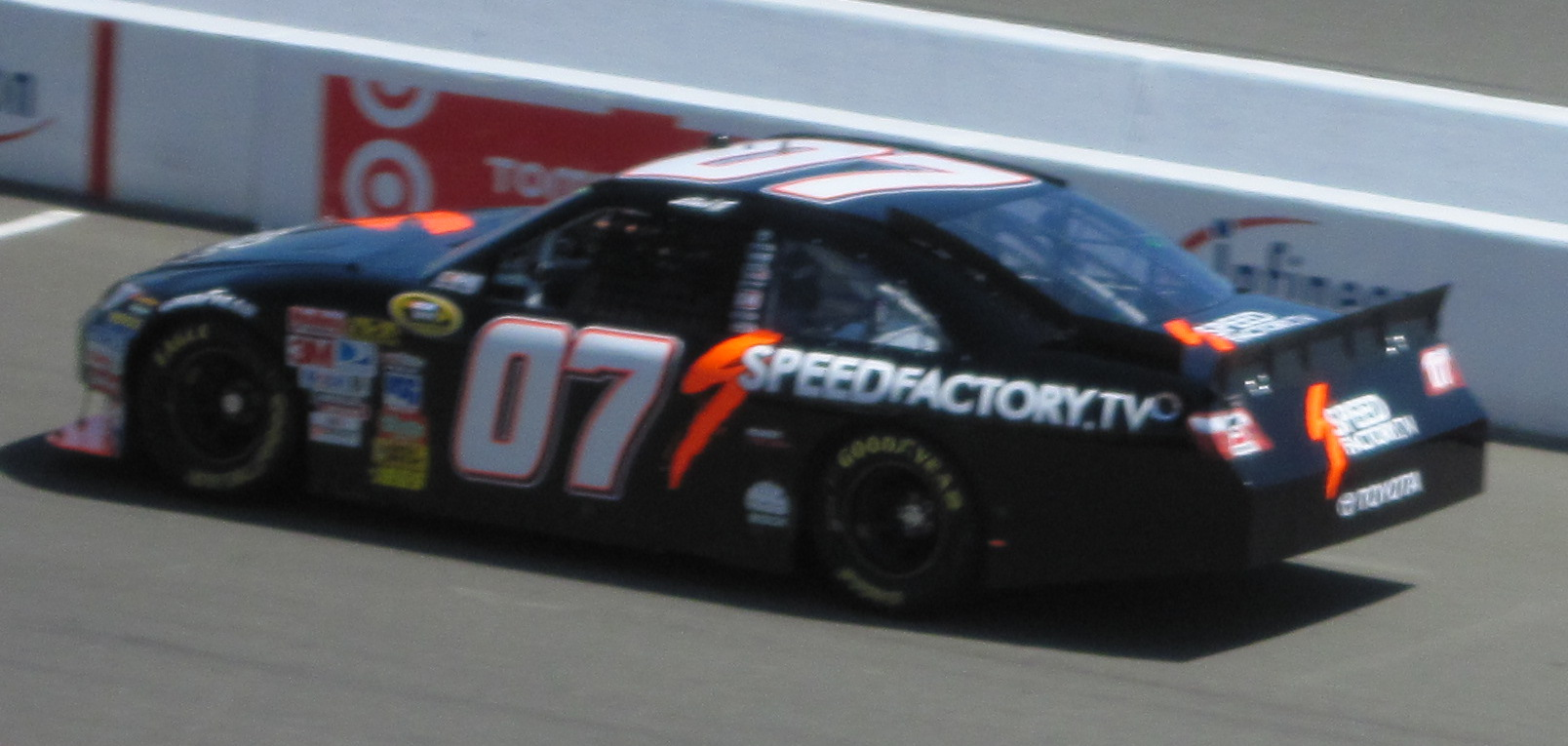
P. J. Jones in the No. 07 Toyota during the 2010 Toyota/Save Mart 350

For 2010, Robby Gordon Motorsports aligned with BAM Racing and continued with Toyota. Starting with the 2010 Daytona 500, Robby Gordon Motorsports expanded its partnership with Monster Energy Drink to include sponsorship in some Sprint Cup events. RGM's alliance with BAM Racing was to allow BAM Racing's sponsor Warner Music Nashville to sponsor Robby Gordon's No. 7 Camry starting at California as well as the events at Atlanta and Bristol. They also planned to field the BAM Racing No. 49 Toyota for a number of races out of the RGM shop.

For the first half of 2010, the team had floated in and out of the Top 35. At the 2010 Gillette Fusion ProGlide 500, the team had its first DNQ since 2005, with Ted Musgrave driving. A major penalty by another team moved the No. 7 back into the top 35. The Toyota/Save Mart 350 proved to be the best race in 2010 for Robby Gordon Motorsports, Gordon finished second in the race and a second RGM entry, the No. 07 car driven by P. J. Jones, qualified and finished 41st. Former series champion Bobby Labonte drove at New Hampshire.

Robby Gordon made his return to Montreal, for the first time since his controversial run in 2007, in his self-owned #07 Menards/Mapei Toyota. Robby Gordon qualified 10th, but was sent to the back of the field due to a pre-race change on his car. Despite this setback, Gordon charged through the field to lead a few laps early on, but then got shuffled out of the lead due to pit stops. He made another charge through the field, taking the lead with about 15 laps to go and controlling it until he ran out of gas on the last restart. He finished 14th.

Gordon stepped out of the No. 7 to allow Kevin Conway to drive. Conway, a NASCAR Sprint Cup Rookie of the Year contender, having been released from his ride at Front Row Motorsports, brought his sponsor ExtenZe with him. Conway drove the locked-in No. 7 in the Irwin Tools Night Race at Bristol while Gordon moved into the No. 07 that Jones was originally supposed to drive. Conway qualified 40th and finished 36th in the while Gordon qualified 37th and finished 40th. Gordon did not enter the Emory Healthcare 500 at Atlanta, fielding Conway in the No. 7. Conway had the slowest time of all 47 qualifiers, but due to RGM being in the top 35 in owners' points he started 42nd. Occasionally, Gordon and Conway switched between the No. 7 and No. 07 rides in order to keep the No. 7 team in the top 35. Conway started and parked in five out of the seven races he ran with the team, with his only full race coming at Fontana, resulting in a 31st-place finish. The No. 7 team finished 32nd in 2010 owner's points. It was later announced following the season that RGM would sue ExtenZe for lack of payment, much like Conway's former team, Front Row Motorsports, had done. Gordon also announced his intents to sue BAM Racing for breach-of-contract; the partnership with BAM had abruptly dissolved mid-season.

=== 2011–2012 ===
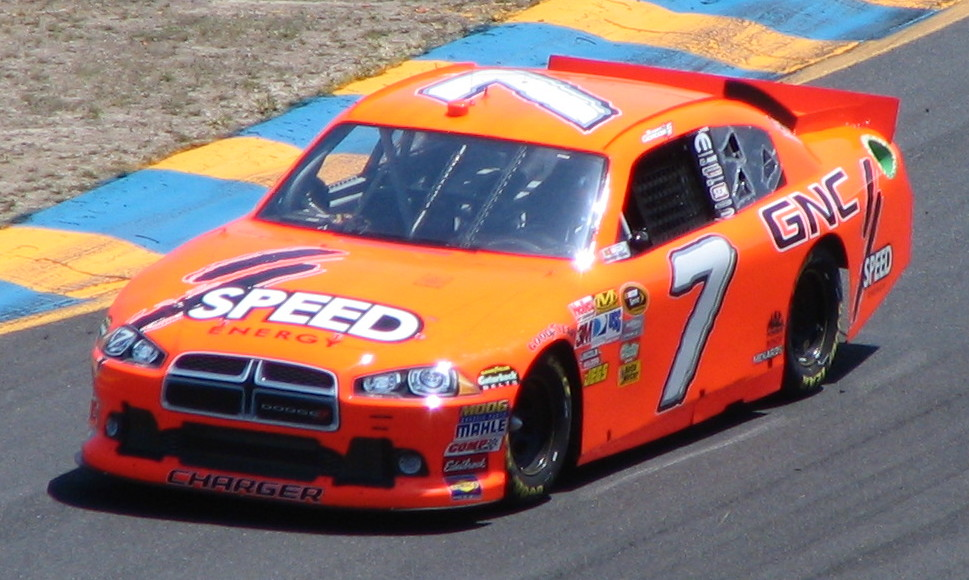
Robby Gordon's Speed Energy-sponsored car at Infineon Raceway in 2011

Gordon returned to Sprint Cup in 2011, but for only 25 races. He returned to Dodge and started his own brand of energy drink, Speed Energy, as a sponsor. Gordon's best finish of the year was 16th at the Daytona 500, though he also parked the car in ten starts. In May, 2007 Formula One Champion Kimi Räikkönen tested Gordon's car at Infineon, with plans of Gordon fielding an additional car for Räikkönen at the Toyota/Save Mart 350, but he crashed the car and the deal fell through. He attempted the 2012 Daytona 500 with sponsorship from Mapei and Speed Energy. During practice at Bristol Motor Speedway, Gordon's Electronic Fuel Injection, or EFI, shorted out and was not repairable, therefore, the team was forced to withdraw. It was then announced that the team would not enter until Sonoma Raceway, which to date is their last attempt and start in the Sprint Cup Series. At the time, Gordon was one of two full owner/drivers in the series, the other being Joe Nemechek. He later stated he had been unhappy with the gap between the larger and smaller teams in spending, which granted the former an advantage.

=== 2013 ===
RGM did not race in NASCAR in 2013 due to Gordon launching the Stadium Super Trucks. NASCAR then reassigned the No. 7 to Tommy Baldwin Racing and Dave Blaney to renumber their No. 10 car. The No. 10 went with Danica Patrick to Stewart–Haas Racing. The No. 7 is currently used by Spire Motorsports with Daniel Suárez driving.

==== Car No. 7 results ====
NASCAR Sprint Cup Series results
Year	Driver	No.	Make	1	2	3	4	5	6	7	8	9	10	11	12	13	14	15	16	17	18	19	20	21	22	23	24	25	26	27	28	29	30	31	32	33	34	35	36	Owners	Pts
2005	Robby Gordon	7	Chevy	DAY; DNQ	CAL; 35	LVS; 39	ATL; 34	BRI; DNQ	MAR; 20	TEX; 37	PHO; 37	TAL; DNQ	DAR; DNQ	RCH; 31	CLT; 27	DOV; 29	POC; 39	MCH; 39	SON; 16	DAY; 26	CHI; 35	NHA; 30	POC; 40	IND; 24	GLN; 2	MCH; 30	BRI; 38	CAL; 34	RCH; 35	NHA; 37	DOV; 29	TAL; 23	KAN; DNQ	CLT; 32	MAR; 41	ATL; DNQ	TEX; DNQ	PHO; 8	HOM; 14	38th	2279
2006	Robby Gordon	7	Chevy	DAY; 13	CAL; 26	LVS; 12	ATL; 28	BRI; 26	MAR; 43	TEX; 20	PHO; 41	TAL; 10	RCH; 39	DAR; 13	CLT; 16	DOV; 36	POC; 35	MCH; 18	SON; 40	DAY; 14	CHI; 19	NHA; 19	POC; 13	IND; 35	GLN; 4	MCH; 12	BRI; 27	CAL; 43	RCH; 19	NHA; 15	DOV; 41	KAN; 36	TAL; 16	CLT; 25	MAR; 37	ATL; 10	TEX; 39	PHO; 32	HOM; 40	31st	3113
2007	Robby Gordon	7	Ford	DAY; 15	CAL; 21	LVS; 17	ATL; 20	BRI; 33	MAR; 34	TEX; 24	PHO; 24	TAL; 41	RCH; 34	DAR; 38	CLT; 22	DOV; 10	POC; 41	MCH; 13	SON; 16	NHA; 17	DAY; 15	CHI; 36	IND; 27		GLN; 5	MCH; 24	BRI; 20	CAL; 41	RCH; 36	NHA; 31	DOV; 19	KAN; 19	TAL; 29	CLT; 38	MAR; 39	ATL; 21	TEX; 32	PHO; 24	HOM; 27	28th	3066
2007	P. J. Jones	7	Ford																					POC; 37																28th	3066
2008	Robby Gordon	7	Dodge	DAY; 8	CAL; 18	LVS; 42	ATL; 24	BRI; 24	MAR; 40	TEX; 30	PHO; 29	TAL; 11	RCH; 26	DAR; 33	CLT; 43	DOV; 19	POC; 36	MCH; 40	SON; 36	NHA; 26	DAY; 6	CHI; 25	IND; 33	POC; 37	GLN; 27	MCH; 37	BRI; 39	CAL; 40	RCH; 42	NHA; 26	DOV; 22	KAN; 37	TAL; 8	CLT; 30	MAR; 40	ATL; 19	TEX; 36	PHO; 28	HOM; 26	34th	2770
2009	Robby Gordon	7	Toyota	DAY; 34	CAL; 30	LVS; 15	ATL; 26	BRI; 21	MAR; 40	TEX; 39	PHO; 39	TAL; 29	RCH; 16	DAR; 28	CLT; 3	DOV; 33	POC; 31	MCH; 17	SON; 36	NHA; 25	DAY; 22	CHI; 34	IND; 28	POC; 33	GLN; 18	MCH; 37	BRI; 32	ATL; 16		NHA; 24	DOV; 34	KAN; 34	CAL; 38	CLT; 30	MAR; 37	TAL; 32	TEX; 27	PHO; 22	HOM; 39	34th	2790
2009	David Gilliland	7	Toyota																										RCH; 24											34th	2790
2010	Robby Gordon	7	Toyota	DAY; 28	CAL; 33	LVS; 32	ATL; 43	BRI; 22	MAR; 34	PHO; 14	TEX; 31	TAL; 20	RCH; 28	DAR; 38	DOV; 31	CLT; 33		MCH; 33	SON; 2		DAY; 12	CHI; 38	IND; 36		GLN; 36					NHA; 26				CLT; 33	MAR; 22	TAL; 18	TEX; 35	PHO; 33		32nd	2587
2010	Ted Musgrave	7	Toyota														POC; DNQ																							32nd	2587
2010	Bobby Labonte	7	Toyota																	NHA; 30																				32nd	2587
2010	P. J. Jones	7	Toyota																					POC; 35		MCH; 37														32nd	2587
2010	Kevin Conway	7	Toyota																								BRI; 36	ATL; 37	RCH; 41		DOV; 37	KAN; 38	CAL; 31						HOM; 30	32nd	2587
2011	Robby Gordon	7	Dodge	DAY; 16	PHO; 32	LVS; 32	BRI; 39	CAL; 34	MAR; 23	TEX; 31	TAL; 20	RCH; 35	DAR; 37		CLT; 38			MCH; 37	SON; 18	DAY; 34			IND; 43	POC; 35	GLN; 24		BRI; 43	ATL; 39	RCH; 37	CHI; 39	NHA; 40			CLT; 38	TAL; 37			PHO; 32		38th	334
2011	Scott Wimmer	7	Dodge											DOV; 37			POC; 27				KEN; 37	NHA; 27																		38th	334
2011	Johnny Sauter	7	Dodge													KAN; 36										MCH; DNQ														38th	334
2011	Reed Sorenson	7	Dodge																													DOV; 38	KAN; 38			MAR; 36	TEX; DNQ		HOM; DNQ	38th	334
2012	Robby Gordon	7	Dodge	DAY; 41	PHO; 41	LVS; DNQ	BRI; Wth	CAL; DNQ	MAR	TEX	KAN	RCH	TAL	DAR	CLT	DOV	POC	MCH	SON; 39	KEN	DAY	NHA	IND	POC	GLN	MCH	BRI	ATL	RCH	CHI	NHA	DOV	TAL	CLT	KAN	MAR	TEX	PHO	HOM	53rd	11

==== Car No. 04/07/77 results ====
NASCAR Sprint Cup Series results
Year	Driver	No.	Make	1	2	3	4	5	6	7	8	9	10	11	12	13	14	15	16	17	18	19	20	21	22	23	24	25	26	27	28	29	30	31	32	33	34	35	36	Owners	Pts
2007	Marcos Ambrose	77	Ford	DAY	CAL	LVS	ATL	BRI	MAR	TEX	PHO	TAL	RCH	DAR	CLT	DOV	POC	MCH	SON	NHA	DAY	CHI	IND	POC	GLN; DNQ	MCH	BRI	CAL	RCH	NHA	DOV; Wth	KAN	TAL	CLT	MAR	ATL	TEX	PHO	HOM	NA	-
2009	P. J. Jones	04	Toyota	DAY	CAL	LVS	ATL	BRI	MAR	TEX	PHO	TAL	RCH	DAR	CLT	DOV	POC	MCH	SON; 43	NHA	DAY	CHI	IND	POC	GLN; 41	MCH	BRI	ATL	RCH	NHA	DOV									62nd	40
2009	David Gilliland	04	Toyota																													KAN; DNQ	CAL	CLT	MAR	TAL	TEX	PHO	HOM	62nd	40
2010	P. J. Jones	07	Toyota	DAY	CAL	LVS	ATL	BRI	MAR	PHO	TEX	TAL	RCH	DAR	DOV	CLT	POC	MCH	SON; 41	NHA	DAY	CHI	IND	POC	GLN; 41															51st	142
2010	Robby Gordon	07	Toyota																							MCH; 39	BRI; 40	ATL	RCH	NHA	DOV	KAN	CAL		MAR; DNQ	TAL	TEX	PHO	HOM	51st	142
2010	Kevin Conway	07	Toyota																															CLT; DNQ						51st	142
2011	Scott Wimmer	77	Dodge	DAY	PHO	LVS	BRI	CAL	MAR	TEX	TAL	RCH	DAR	DOV	CLT; DNQ	KAN	POC	MCH					IND; DNQ	POC																57th	1
2011	P. J. Jones	77	Dodge																SON; 43	DAY					GLN; DNQ	MCH	BRI	ATL	RCH	CHI	NHA	DOV	KAN	CLT	TAL	MAR	TEX	PHO	HOM	57th	1
2011	Robby Gordon	77	Dodge																		KEN; DNQ	NHA																		57th	1

== Open-wheel racing ==
Robby Gordon himself raced for several teams in both CART and the Indy Racing League throughout the 1990s and early 2000s including Chip Ganassi, A. J. Foyt Team Menard, and Andretti Autosport. On two separate occasions, however, Gordon fielded his own team, first in 1999 and again for a one-off Indianapolis stint in 2004. After 1999 Gordon withdrew from CART altogether, while after 2004 Gordon would never professionally race open-wheel cars again.

=== Complete CART FedEx Championship Series results ===
(key) (results in bold indicate pole position) (results in italics indicate fastest lap)

Year	Chassis	Engine	Drivers	No.	1	2	3	4	5	6	7	8	9	10	11	12	13	14	15	16	17	18	19	20	Pts Pos	Pos
1999					MIA	MOT	LBH	NAZ	RIO	GAT	MIL	POR	CLE	ROA	TOR	MCH	DET	MDO	CHI	VAN	LAG	HOU	SRF	FON		
1999	Reynard 98i	Toyota RV8D V8t	(United States) Robby Gordon	22	19	8	16	19																	20th	**27**
1999	Swift 010.c	Toyota RV8D V8t	(United States) Robby Gordon	22					14	27	24	17	9	8	13	26	25	10					8		20th	**27**
1999	Eagle 997; 987^{1}	Toyota RV8D V8t	(United States) Robby Gordon	22															10	22	19	21		11	20th	**27**

1. Used at Fontana.

=== Complete IRL IndyCar Series results ===
(key)

Year	Chassis	Engine	Drivers	No.	1	2	3	4	5	6	7	8	9	10	11	12	13	14	15	16
2004					HMS	PHX	MOT	INDY	TXS	RIR	KAN	NSH	MIL	MCH	KTY	PPIR	NAZ	CHI	FON	TXS
2004	Dallara IR-04	Chevrolet Indy V8	(United States) Robby Gordon	70				29^{1}												
2004	Dallara IR-04	Chevrolet Indy V8	(United States) Jaques Lazier	70				Rpl^{1}												

1. After a red flag for rain at Indianapolis Motor Speedway, Robby Gordon left the track to race in the 2004 Coca-Cola 600 (see Double Duty). Jaques Lazier became his replacement driver, but all points were awarded to Robby Gordon.

== Off-road racing ==
Besides his NASCAR racing career. Gordon has competed in a few other racing organizations as an owner. He won the Baja 500 three times in 1989, 1990, and 2005.

In 2009 Gordon was declared the winner of the Baja 500 but was stripped of the title in one of the most controversial decisions made in the sport. The officials accused Gordon of speeding illegally and having an illegal fueling system. Gordon appealed but it was denied and Gordon was put in 7th place for the final results.

In 2012 at the Dakar Rally, Gordon won the final stage under controversy of his tire inflation being illegal. This was proven false and Gordon won by 15 minutes ahead of the second-place finisher.

=== Stadium Super Trucks ===
The team's race shop is currently used to build the Stadium Super Trucks.
