= 2011 Bank of America 500 =

Race details
- Race 31 of 36 in the 2011 NASCAR Sprint Cup Series
- The 2011 Bank of America 500 program cover, featuring an Oktoberfest style party. Artwork by Sam Bass. The painting is called "Octoberfast!"
- Date: October 15, 2011
- Location: Charlotte Motor Speedway, Concord, North Carolina
- Course: Permanent racing facility
- Course length: 1.5 miles (2.4 km)
- Distance: 334 laps, 501 mi (806 km)
- Weather: Clear with temperatures around 72 °F (22 °C), wind WNW at 8 mph.
- Average speed: 146.194 miles per hour (235.276 km/h)

Pole position
Driver	Tony Stewart	Stewart–Haas Racing
- Time: 28.131

Most laps led
Driver	Kyle Busch	Joe Gibbs Racing
- Laps: 110

Winner
No. 17	Matt Kenseth	Roush Fenway Racing

Television in the United States
- Network: ABC
- Announcers: Allen Bestwick, Dale Jarrett, and Andy Petree

The 2011 Bank of America 500 was a NASCAR Sprint Cup Series race held on October 15, 2011, at Charlotte Motor Speedway in Concord, North Carolina. Contested over 334 laps on the 1.5-mile (2.4 km) asphalt quad-oval, it was the 31st race of the 2011 Sprint Cup Series season, as well as the fifth race in the ten-race Chase for the Sprint Cup, which ends the season. The race was won by Matt Kenseth for the Roush Fenway Racing team. Kyle Busch finished second, and Carl Edwards clinched third.

== Report ==
=== Background ===
Charlotte Motor Speedway, the race track where the race was held.

Charlotte Motor Speedway is one of ten intermediate to hold NASCAR races. The standard track at Charlotte Motor Speedway is a four-turn quad-oval track that is 1.5 miles (2.4 km) long. The track's turns are banked at twenty-four degrees, while the front stretch, the location of the finish line, is five degrees. The back stretch, opposite of the front, also had a five degree banking. The racetrack has seats for 140,000 spectators.

Heading into the fifth race of the Chase for the Sprint Cup, Ford driver Carl Edwards was leading the Drivers' Championship with 2,161 points; Chevrolet driver Kevin Harvick was second with 2,160 points, one point behind Edwards. Behind Edwards and Harvick in the Drivers' Championship, Jimmie Johnson was third with 2,157 points in a Chevrolet, and Brad Keselowski was fourth with 2,150 points. Matt Kenseth was fifth with 2,149, four points ahead of Kurt Busch. Tony Stewart, Kyle Busch, Dale Earnhardt Jr., and Jeff Gordon rounded out the first ten positions in the Drivers' Championship. Chevrolet had already secured the Manufacturer's Championship one week earlier after the Hollywood Casino 400, and entered the race on 204 points, 43 points ahead of Ford on 161 points and 50 points ahead of Toyota. Jamie McMurray was the race's defending winner.

=== Practice and qualifying ===
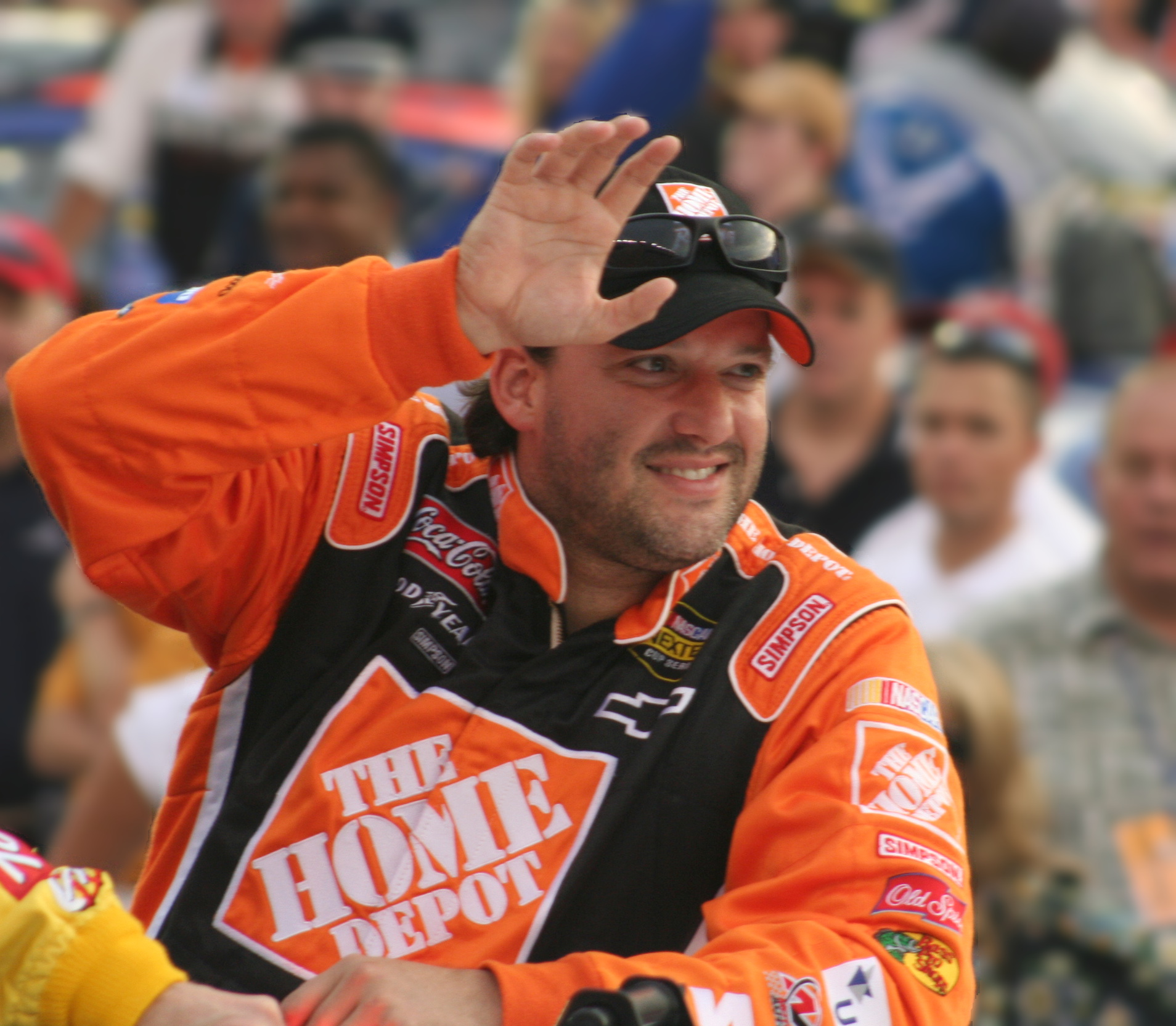
Tony Stewart qualified on the pole position for Stewart–Haas Racing

Three practice sessions were held before the race; the first on Thursday, which lasted 90 minutes. The second and third were both on Friday afternoon. The first Saturday practice lasted 45 minutes, while the second lasted 60. Kasey Kahne was quickest with a time of 28.205 seconds in the first session, 0.018 seconds faster than Paul Menard. Greg Biffle was just off Busch's pace, followed by Mark Martin, Regan Smith, and Marcos Ambrose. Denny Hamlin was seventh, still within two-tenths of a second of Edwards's time.

Forty-six cars were entered for qualifying, but only forty-three could qualify for the race because of NASCAR's qualifying procedure. Stewart clinched the 13th pole position of his career, with a time of 28.131 seconds. He was joined on the front row of the grid by Kenseth. Edwards qualified third, A. J. Allmendinger took fourth, and Biffle started fifth. Ryan Newman, Menard, Kahne, Johnson and Trevor Bayne rounded out the first ten positions. The three drivers that failed to qualify for the race were Geoff Bodine, Scott Speed, and Josh Wise.

Once the qualifying session completed, Stewart commented, "I was watching guys' lap times, and looking at the sheet to seeing what they practiced, and it wasn't as much [of an increase] as what we've seen. I think, obviously, we've had a lot of cloud cover today and cool temperatures here the last couple of days, so I don't think the track changed as much and got as hot during the day as what we typically see here. I think that's the reason that we didn't have the big pick-ups. But you still anticipate that, at night, the guys are going to pick up speed. It just seems like the air's a little muggier right now. I don't know whether that hurt horsepower or even created more drag and kind of evened everything out."

In the second practice session, Keselowski was fastest with a time of 28.810 seconds, less than a tenth of a second quicker than second-placed Kahne. Newman took third place, ahead of Kurt Busch, Stewart and Kyle Busch. Johnson was only quick enough for the 10th position. In the third and final practice, Kahne remained quickest with a time of 28.700 seconds. Menard followed in second, ahead of Biffle and Johnson. Jeff Burton was fifth quickest, with a time of 28.855 seconds. Newman, Ambrose, Gordon, Allmendinger, and Kurt Busch rounded out the first ten positions.

== Results ==
=== Qualifying ===
Grid	No.	Driver	Team	Manufacturer	Time	Speed
1	14	Tony Stewart	Stewart–Haas Racing	Chevrolet	28.131	191.959
2	17	Matt Kenseth	Roush Fenway Racing	Ford	28.137	191.918
3	99	Carl Edwards	Roush Fenway Racing	Ford	28.144	191.870
4	43	A. J. Allmendinger	Richard Petty Motorsports	Ford	28.159	191.768
5	16	Greg Biffle	Roush Fenway Racing	Ford	28.163	191.741
6	39	Ryan Newman	Stewart–Haas Racing	Chevrolet	28.186	191.585
7	27	Paul Menard	Richard Childress Racing	Chevrolet	28.204	191.462
8	4	Kasey Kahne	Red Bull Racing Team	Toyota	28.214	191.394
9	48	Jimmie Johnson	Hendrick Motorsports	Chevrolet	28.222	191.340
10	21	Trevor Bayne	Wood Brothers Racing	Ford	28.234	191.259
11	6	David Ragan	Roush Fenway Racing	Ford	28.272	191.002
12	9	Marcos Ambrose	Richard Petty Motorsports	Ford	28.272	191.002
13	5	Mark Martin	Hendrick Motorsports	Chevrolet	28.287	190.900
14	29	Kevin Harvick	Richard Childress Racing	Chevrolet	28.288	190.894
15	88	Dale Earnhardt Jr.	Hendrick Motorsports	Chevrolet	28.297	190.833
16	20	Joey Logano	Joe Gibbs Racing	Toyota	28.299	190.820
17	11	Denny Hamlin	Joe Gibbs Racing	Toyota	28.302	190.799
18	56	Martin Truex Jr.	Michael Waltrip Racing	Toyota	28.326	190.638
19	33	Clint Bowyer	Richard Childress Racing	Chevrolet	28.330	190.611
20	22	Kurt Busch	Penske Racing	Dodge	28.336	190.570
21	78	Regan Smith	Furniture Row Racing	Chevrolet	28.357	190.429
22	47	Bobby Labonte	JTG Daugherty Racing	Toyota	28.383	190.255
23	24	Jeff Gordon	Hendrick Motorsports	Chevrolet	28.420	190.007
24	13	Casey Mears	Germain Racing	Toyota	28.462	189.727
25	18	Kyle Busch	Joe Gibbs Racing	Toyota	28.490	189.540
26	2	Brad Keselowski	Penske Racing	Dodge	28.493	189.520
27	1	Jamie McMurray	Earnhardt Ganassi Racing	Chevrolet	28.511	189.401
28	31	Jeff Burton	Richard Childress Racing	Chevrolet	28.559	189.082
29	00	David Reutimann	Michael Waltrip Racing	Toyota	28.583	188.923
30	51	Landon Cassill	Phoenix Racing	Chevrolet	28.594	188.851
31	83	Brian Vickers	Red Bull Racing Team	Toyota	28.606	188.772
32	42	Juan Pablo Montoya	Earnhardt Ganassi Racing	Chevrolet	28.613	188.725
33	34	David Gilliland	Front Row Motorsports	Ford	28.632	188.600
34	55	Travis Kvapil	Front Row Motorsports	Ford	28.682	188.271
35	36	Dave Blaney	Tommy Baldwin Racing	Chevrolet	28.687	188.239
36	30	David Stremme	Inception Motorsports	Chevrolet	28.736	187.918
37	66	Michael McDowell	HP Racing	Toyota	28.807	187.454
38	38	J. J. Yeley	Front Row Motorsports	Ford	28.818	187.383
39	87	Joe Nemechek	NEMCO Motorsports	Toyota	28.829	187.311
40	77	Andy Lally	TRG Motorsports	Ford	28.930	186.657
41	71	Hermie Sadler	TRG Motorsports	Ford	29.083	185.676
42	32	Mike Bliss	FAS Lane Racing	Ford	29.120	185.440
43	7	Robby Gordon	Robby Gordon Motorsports	Dodge	28.985	186.303
Failed to Qualify
	35	Geoff Bodine	Tommy Baldwin Racing	Chevrolet	28.994	186.245
	46	Scott Speed	Whitney Motorsports	Ford	29.000	186.207
	37	Josh Wise	Max Q Motorsports	Ford	29.129	185.382

=== Race results ===
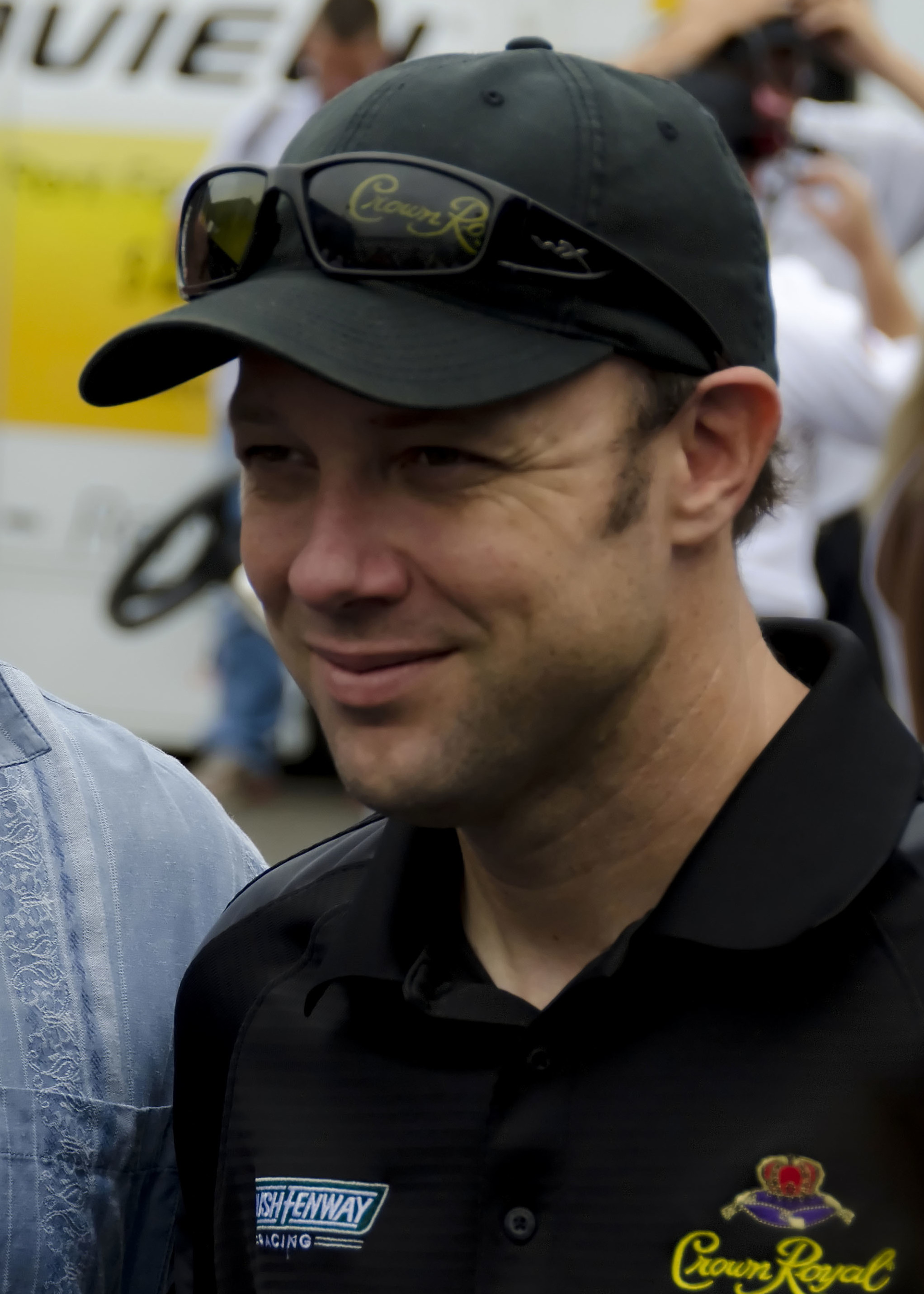
Matt Kenseth won the race.

Pos	Grid	Car	Driver	Team	Manufacturer	Laps Run	Points
1	2	17	Matt Kenseth	Roush Fenway Racing	Ford	334	47
2	25	18	Kyle Busch	Joe Gibbs Racing	Toyota	334	44
3	3	99	Carl Edwards	Roush Fenway Racing	Ford	334	42
4	8	4	Kasey Kahne	Red Bull Racing Team	Toyota	334	40
5	12	9	Marcos Ambrose	Richard Petty Motorsports	Ford	334	39
6	14	29	Kevin Harvick	Richard Childress Racing	Chevrolet	334	38
7	4	43	A. J. Allmendinger	Richard Petty Motorsports	Ford	334	37
8	1	14	Tony Stewart	Stewart–Haas Racing	Chevrolet	334	37
9	17	11	Denny Hamlin	Joe Gibbs Racing	Toyota	334	35
10	6	39	Ryan Newman	Stewart–Haas Racing	Chevrolet	334	35
11	11	6	David Ragan	Roush Fenway Racing	Ford	334	34
12	16	20	Joey Logano	Joe Gibbs Racing	Toyota	334	32
13	20	22	Kurt Busch	Penske Racing	Dodge	334	31
14	32	42	Juan Pablo Montoya	Earnhardt Ganassi Racing	Chevrolet	334	31
15	5	16	Greg Biffle	Roush Fenway Racing	Ford	334	30
16	26	2	Brad Keselowski	Penske Racing	Dodge	333	28
17	7	27	Paul Menard	Richard Childress Racing	Chevrolet	333	27
18	28	31	Jeff Burton	Richard Childress Racing	Chevrolet	333	26
19	15	88	Dale Earnhardt Jr.	Hendrick Motorsports	Chevrolet	333	25
20	31	83	Brian Vickers	Red Bull Racing Team	Toyota	333	24
21	23	24	Jeff Gordon	Hendrick Motorsports	Chevrolet	333	23
22	38	38	J. J. Yeley	Front Row Motorsports	Ford	333	23
23	18	56	Martin Truex Jr.	Michael Waltrip Racing	Toyota	332	21
24	19	33	Clint Bowyer	Richard Childress Racing	Chevrolet	332	20
25	21	78	Regan Smith	Furniture Row Racing	Chevrolet	332	19
26	29	00	David Reutimann	Michael Waltrip Racing	Toyota	332	18
27	27	1	Jamie McMurray	Earnhardt Ganassi Racing	Chevrolet	332	17
28	30	51	Landon Cassill	Phoenix Racing	Chevrolet	332	0
29	22	47	Bobby Labonte	JTG Daugherty Racing	Toyota	331	15
30	42	32	Mike Bliss	FAS Lane Racing	Ford	331	0
31	10	21	Trevor Bayne	Wood Brothers Racing	Ford	329	0
32	24	13	Casey Mears	Germain Racing	Toyota	323	12
33	41	71	Hermie Sadler	TRG Motorsports	Ford	322	0
34	9	48	Jimmie Johnson	Hendrick Motorsports	Chevrolet	316	11
35	35	36	Dave Blaney	Tommy Baldwin Racing	Chevrolet	292	9
36	33	34	David Gilliland	Front Row Motorsports	Ford	289	8
37	13	5	Mark Martin	Hendrick Motorsports	Chevrolet	287	7
38	43	7	Robby Gordon	Robby Gordon Motorsports	Dodge	33	6
39	37	66	Michael McDowell	HP Racing	Toyota	30	5
40	34	55	Travis Kvapil	Front Row Motorsports	Ford	27	0
41	36	30	David Stremme	Inception Motorsports	Chevrolet	22	3
42	40	77	Andy Lally	TRG Motorsports	Ford	20	0
43	39	87	Joe Nemechek	NEMCO Motorsports	Toyota	11	0

== Standings after the race ==
Drivers' Championship standings

Pos	Driver	Points
1	Carl Edwards	2,203
2	Kevin Harvick	2,198
3	Matt Kenseth	2,196
4	Kyle Busch	2,185
5	Tony Stewart	2,179
6	Brad Keselowski	2,178
7	Kurt Busch	2,176
8	Jimmie Johnson	2,168
9	Dale Earnhardt Jr.	2,143
10	Ryan Newman	2,142
11	Jeff Gordon	2,137
12	Denny Hamlin	2,117

Manufacturers' Championship standings

Pos	Manufacturer	Points
1	Chevrolet	208
2	Ford	170
3	Toyota	160
4	Dodge	144

- Note: Only the first twelve positions are included for the driver standings.

Previous race: 2011 Hollywood Casino 400	Sprint Cup Series; 2011 season	Next race: 2011 Good Sam Club 500
