= 2011 STP 400 =

Race details
- Race 13 of 36 in the 2011 NASCAR Sprint Cup Series
- Date: June 5, 2011
- Location: Kansas Speedway, Kansas City, Kansas
- Course: Permanent racing facility
- Course length: 1.5 miles (2.4 km)
- Distance: 267 laps, 400.5 mi (644.5 km)
- Weather: Sunny with a high of 88; wind out of the South at 8 mph.
- Average speed: 137.186 miles per hour (220.779 km/h)

Pole position
Driver	Kurt Busch	Penske Racing
- Time: 30.901

Most laps led
Driver	Kurt Busch	Penske Racing
- Laps: 152

Winner
No. 2	Brad Keselowski	Penske Racing

Television in the United States
- Network: Fox Broadcasting Company
- Announcers: Mike Joy, Darrell Waltrip and Larry McReynolds

The 2011 STP 400 was a NASCAR Sprint Cup Series motor race held on June 5, 2011 at Kansas Speedway in Kansas City, Kansas. Contested over 267 laps on the 1.5-mile (2.4 km) asphalt D-oval, it was the 13th race of the 2011 Sprint Cup Series season. Brad Keselowski of Penske Racing won the race. Dale Earnhardt Jr. finished second, and Denny Hamlin finished third.

== Report ==
=== Background ===
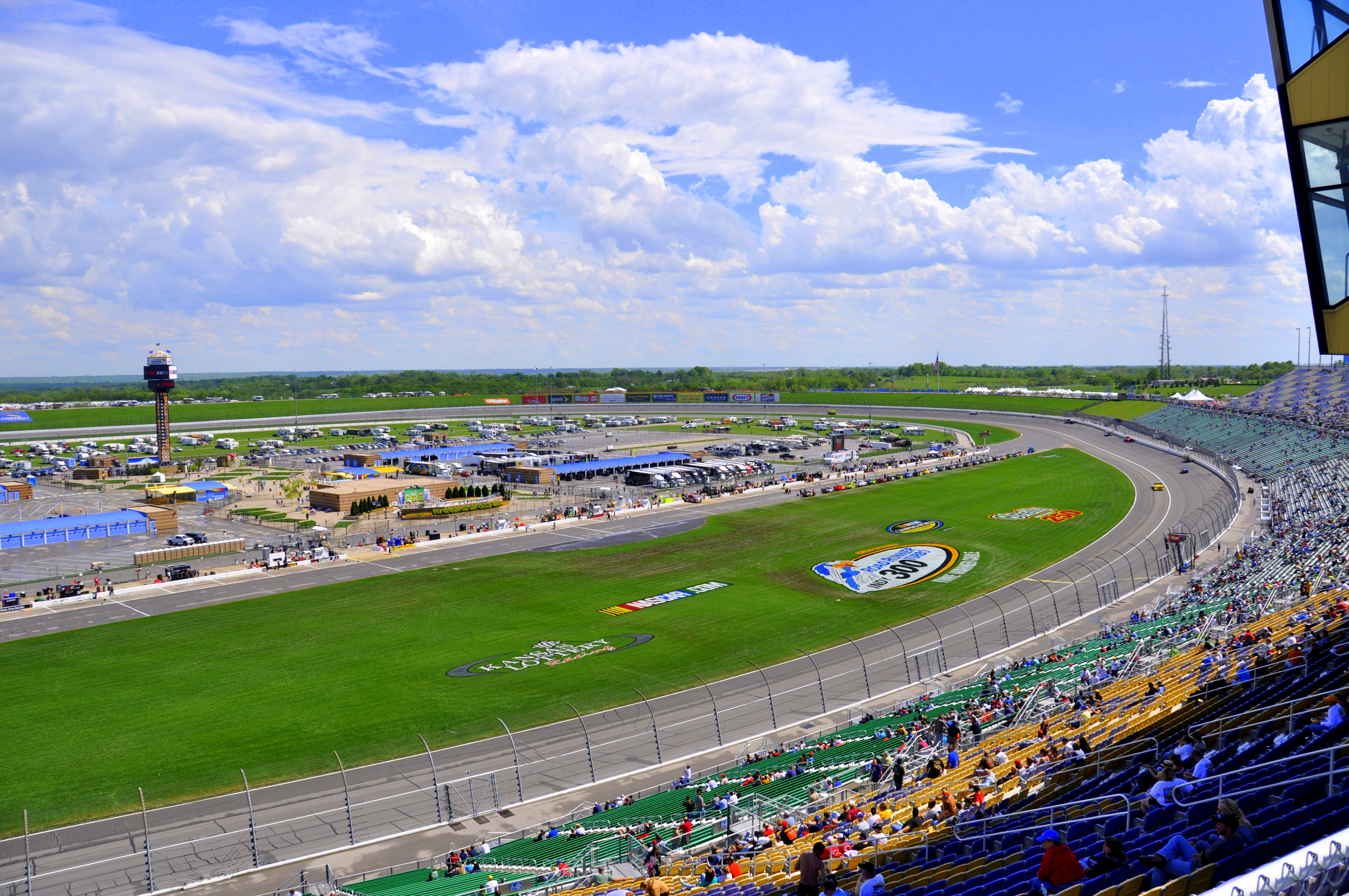
Kansas Speedway, the race track where the race was held.

Kansas Speedway is one of ten intermediate to hold NASCAR races. The standard track at Kansas Speedway is a four-turn D-shaped oval track that is 1.5 miles (2.4 km) long. The track's turns are banked at fifteen degrees, while the front stretch, the location of the finish line, is 10.4 degrees. The back stretch, opposite of the front, is at only five degrees. The racetrack has seats for 82,000 spectators.

Before the race, Carl Edwards led the Drivers' Championship with 445 points, and Kevin Harvick stood in second with 409. Jimmie Johnson was third in the Drivers' Championship with 408 points, six ahead of Dale Earnhardt Jr. and sixteen ahead of Kyle Busch in fourth and fifth. Kurt Busch with 377 was three ahead of Matt Kenseth, as Clint Bowyer with 365 points, was nine ahead of Tony Stewart, and twelve in front of Ryan Newman. In the Manufacturers' Championship, Chevrolet was leading with 83 points, six ahead of Ford. Toyota, with 64 points, was 24 points ahead of Dodge in the battle for third.

=== Practice and qualifying ===
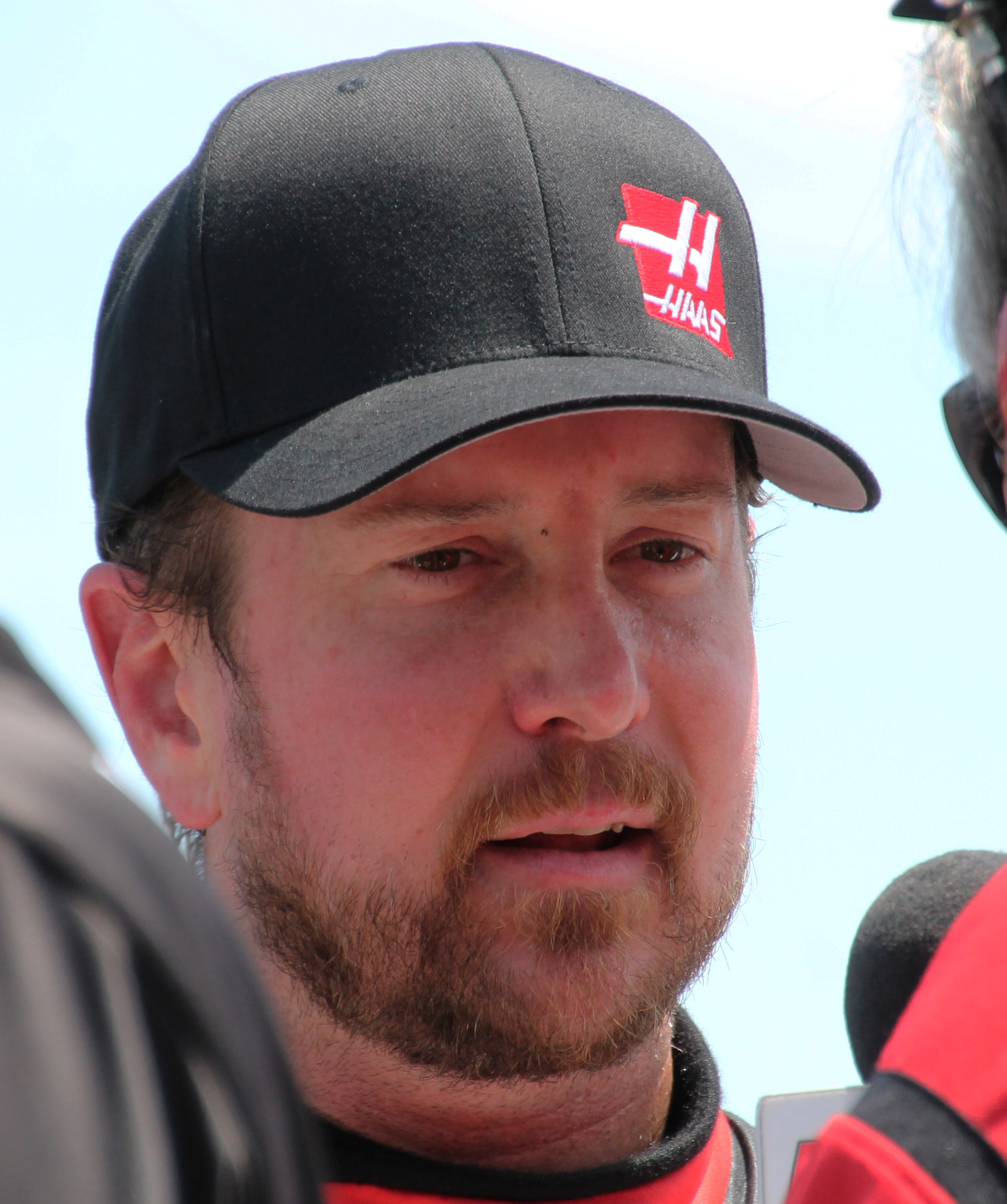
Kurt Busch (pictured in 2015) won the pole position, after having the fastest time of 30.901 seconds.

Two practice sessions were held before the race on Friday. The first session lasted 80 minutes long, while the second was 90 minutes long. Greg Biffle was quickest with a time of 31.917 seconds in the first session, less than one-tenth of a second faster than Edwards. Kasey Kahne was third, followed by Stewart, Jeff Gordon, and Earnhardt Jr. Bobby Labonte was seventh, still within a second of Biffle's time. In the second practice session, Joey Logano was fastest with a time of 31.732 seconds, only one-hundredth of a second quicker than second-placed Gordon. Brian Vickers took third place, ahead of Mark Martin, Paul Menard and Landon Cassill. Kyle Busch only managed 7th place.

Forty-five cars were entered for qualifying, but only forty-three raced because of NASCAR's qualifying procedure. Kurt Busch clinched his 13th pole position during his career, with a time of 30.901 seconds. He was joined on the front row of the grid by Juan Pablo Montoya. Kyle Busch qualified third, Vickers took fourth, and Logano started fifth. Jamie McMurray, Edwards, Martin Truex Jr., Menard, and Harvick rounded out the first ten positions. The two drivers who failed to qualify for the race were Tony Raines and T. J. Bell, who had times of 31.820 and 31.846 seconds.

== Results ==
=== Qualifying ===
Grid	No.	Driver	Team	Manufacturer	Time	Speed
1	22	Kurt Busch	Penske Racing	Dodge	30.901	174.752
2	42	Juan Pablo Montoya	Earnhardt Ganassi Racing	Chevrolet	31.007	174.154
3	18	Kyle Busch	Joe Gibbs Racing	Toyota	31.020	174.081
4	83	Brian Vickers	Red Bull Racing Team	Toyota	31.036	173.992
5	20	Joey Logano	Joe Gibbs Racing	Toyota	31.061	173.852
6	1	Jamie McMurray	Earnhardt Ganassi Racing	Chevrolet	31.087	173.706
7	99	Carl Edwards	Roush Fenway Racing	Ford	31.097	173.650
8	56	Martin Truex Jr.	Michael Waltrip Racing	Toyota	31.104	173.611
9	27	Paul Menard	Richard Childress Racing	Chevrolet	31.108	173.589
10	29	Kevin Harvick	Richard Childress Racing	Chevrolet	31.125	173.494
11	78	Regan Smith	Furniture Row Racing	Chevrolet	31.138	173.421
12	39	Ryan Newman	Stewart Haas Racing	Chevrolet	31.144	173.388
13	14	Tony Stewart	Stewart Haas Racing	Chevrolet	31.149	173.360
14	16	Greg Biffle	Roush Fenway Racing	Ford	31.169	173.249
15	11	Denny Hamlin	Joe Gibbs Racing	Toyota	31.179	173.193
16	31	Jeff Burton	Richard Childress Racing	Chevrolet	31.196	173.099
17	4	Kasey Kahne	Red Bull Racing Team	Toyota	31.208	173.033
18	5	Mark Martin	Hendrick Motorsports	Chevrolet	31.231	172.905
19	6	David Ragan	Roush Fenway Racing	Ford	31.240	172.855
20	47	Bobby Labonte	JTG Daugherty Racing	Toyota	31.255	172.772
21	17	Matt Kenseth	Roush Fenway Racing	Ford	31.258	172.756
22	24	Jeff Gordon	Hendrick Motorsports	Chevrolet	31.259	172.750
23	00	David Reutimann	Michael Waltrip Racing	Toyota	31.264	172.723
24	51	Landon Cassill	Phoenix Racing	Chevrolet	31.265	172.717
25	2	Brad Keselowski	Penske Racing	Dodge	31.303	172.507
26	43	A. J. Allmendinger	Richard Petty Motorsports	Ford	31.353	172.232
27	33	Clint Bowyer	Richard Childress Racing	Chevrolet	31.389	172.035
28	88	Dale Earnhardt Jr.	Hendrick Motorsports	Chevrolet	31.417	171.882
29	30	David Stremme	Inception Motorsports	Chevrolet	31.418	171.876
30	38	Travis Kvapil	Front Row Motorsports	Ford	31.446	171.723
31	48	Jimmie Johnson	Hendrick Motorsports	Chevrolet	31.473	171.567
32	46	J. J. Yeley	Whitney Motorsports	Chevrolet	31.484	171.516
33	13	Casey Mears	Germain Racing	Toyota	31.487	171.499
34	87	Joe Nemechek	NEMCO Motorsports	Toyota	31.497	171.445
35	9	Marcos Ambrose	Richard Petty Motorsports	Ford	31.533	171.249
36	81	Scott Riggs	Whitney Motorsports	Chevrolet	31.582	170.984
37	66	Michael McDowell	HP Racing	Toyota	31.616	170.800
38	34	David Gilliland	Front Row Motorsports	Ford	31.625	170.751
39	71	Andy Lally	TRG Motorsports	Ford	31.655	170.589
40	32	Patrick Carpentier	FAS Lane Racing	Ford	31.852	169.534
41	7	Johnny Sauter	Robby Gordon Motorsports	Dodge	31.975	168.882
42	36	Dave Blaney	Tommy Baldwin Racing	Chevrolet	32.173	167.843
43	60	Mike Skinner	Germain Racing	Toyota	31.753	170.063
Failed to Qualify
	37	Tony Raines	Front Row Motorsports	Ford	31.820	169.705
	50	T. J. Bell	LTD Powersports	Toyota	31.846	169.566

=== Race results ===
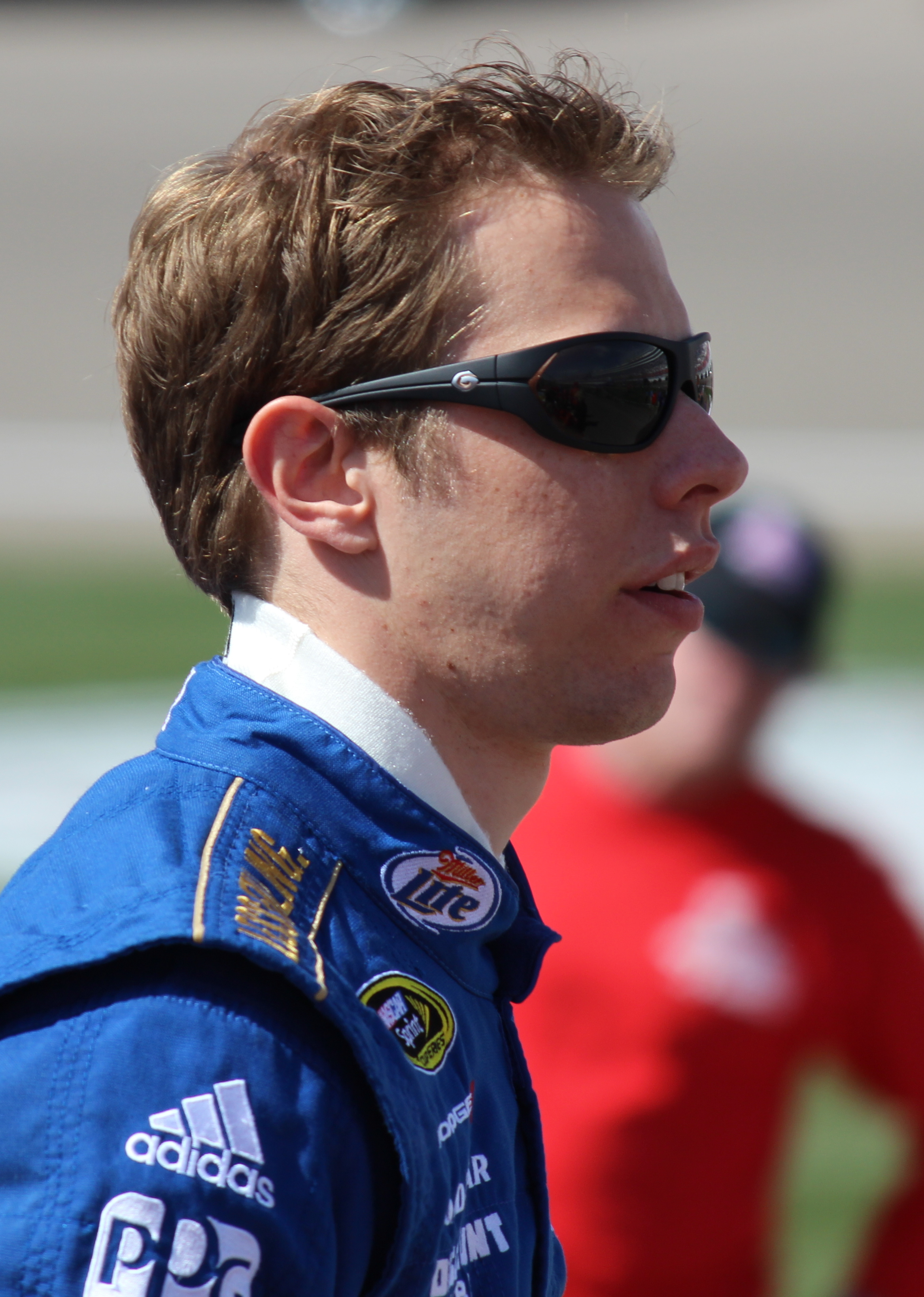
Brad Keselowski won the race, his first with Penske Racing.

Pos	Grid	Car	Driver	Team	Manufacturer	Laps Run	Points
1	25	2	Brad Keselowski	Penske Racing	Dodge	267	47
2	28	88	Dale Earnhardt Jr.	Hendrick Motorsports	Chevrolet	267	42
3	15	11	Denny Hamlin	Joe Gibbs Racing	Toyota	267	42
4	22	24	Jeff Gordon	Hendrick Motorsports	Chevrolet	267	40
5	7	99	Carl Edwards	Roush Fenway Racing	Ford	267	40
6	21	17	Matt Kenseth	Roush Fenway Racing	Ford	267	38
7	31	48	Jimmie Johnson	Hendrick Motorsports	Chevrolet	267	37
8	13	14	Tony Stewart	Stewart Haas Racing	Chevrolet	267	37
9	1	22	Kurt Busch	Penske Racing	Dodge	267	37
10	14	16	Greg Biffle	Roush Fenway Racing	Ford	267	34
11	10	29	Kevin Harvick	Richard Childress Racing	Chevrolet	267	33
12	3	18	Kyle Busch	Joe Gibbs Racing	Toyota	267	33
13	19	6	David Ragan	Roush Fenway Racing	Ford	267	31
14	17	4	Kasey Kahne	Red Bull Racing Team	Toyota	267	30
15	12	39	Ryan Newman	Stewart Haas Racing	Chevrolet	267	29
16	4	83	Brian Vickers	Red Bull Racing Team	Toyota	267	28
17	2	42	Juan Pablo Montoya	Earnhardt Ganassi Racing	Chevrolet	266	28
18	27	33	Clint Bowyer	Richard Childress Racing	Chevrolet	266	26
19	9	27	Paul Menard	Richard Childress Racing	Chevrolet	266	25
20	8	56	Martin Truex Jr.	Michael Waltrip Racing	Toyota	266	24
21	18	5	Mark Martin	Hendrick Motorsports	Chevrolet	266	23
22	23	00	David Reutimann	Michael Waltrip Racing	Toyota	266	22
23	5	20	Joey Logano	Joe Gibbs Racing	Toyota	266	21
24	11	78	Regan Smith	Furniture Row Racing	Chevrolet	266	20
25	16	31	Jeff Burton	Richard Childress Racing	Chevrolet	266	19
26	35	9	Marcos Ambrose	Richard Petty Motorsports	Ford	266	18
27	26	43	A. J. Allmendinger	Richard Petty Motorsports	Ford	266	17
28	20	47	Bobby Labonte	JTG Daugherty Racing	Toyota	266	16
29	6	1	Jamie McMurray	Earnhardt Ganassi Racing	Chevrolet	266	15
30	40	32	Patrick Carpentier	FAS Lane Racing	Ford	265	0
31	39	71	Andy Lally	TRG Motorsports	Ford	265	13
32	42	36	Dave Blaney	Tommy Baldwin Racing	Chevrolet	264	12
33	38	34	David Gilliland	Front Row Motorsports	Ford	263	11
34	30	38	Travis Kvapil	Front Row Motorsports	Ford	243	0
35	24	51	Landon Cassill	Phoenix Racing	Chevrolet	190	0
36	41	7	Johnny Sauter	Robby Gordon Motorsports	Toyota	101	0
37	33	13	Casey Mears	Germain Racing	Toyota	100	8
38	32	46	J. J. Yeley	Whitney Motorsports	Chevrolet	38	6
39	29	30	David Stremme	Inception Motorsports	Chevrolet	37	5
40	43	60	Mike Skinner	Germain Racing	Toyota	34	0
41	37	66	Michael McDowell	HP Racing	Toyota	33	3
42	36	81	Scott Riggs	Whitney Motorsports	Chevrolet	20	0
43	34	87	Joe Nemechek	NEMCO Motorsports	Toyota	19	0

== Standings after the race ==
Drivers' Championship standings

Pos	Driver	Points
1	Carl Edwards	485
2	Jimmie Johnson	445
3	Dale Earnhardt Jr.	444
4	Kevin Harvick	442
5	Kyle Busch	425

Manufacturers' Championship standings

Pos	Manufacturer	Points
1	Chevrolet	89
2	Ford	80
3	Toyota	68
4	Dodge	49

- Note: Only the top five positions are included for the driver standings.

Previous race: 2011 Coca-Cola 600	Sprint Cup Series; 2011 season	Next race: 2011 5-hour Energy 500
