= 2009 Coke Zero 400 =

2009 Coke Zero 400 Powered by Coca-Cola
Race details
- Race 18 of 36 in the 2009 NASCAR Sprint Cup Series
- Daytona International Speedway
- Date: July 4, 2009
- Location: Daytona International Speedway in Daytona Beach, Florida
- Course: Permanent racing facility
- Course length: 2.5 miles (4 km)
- Distance: 160 laps, 400 mi (643.737 km)
- Weather: Temperatures between 75.2 °F (24.0 °C) and 81.7 °F (27.6 °C); wind speeds up to 11.1 miles per hour (17.9 km/h) reported near the speedway

Pole position
Driver	Tony Stewart	Stewart–Haas Racing
- Time: No time trials

Most laps led
Driver	Tony Stewart	Stewart–Haas Racing
- Laps: 86

Winner
No. 14	Tony Stewart	Stewart–Haas Racing

Television in the United States
- Network: Turner Network Television
- Announcers: Ralph Sheheen, Wally Dallenbach Jr. and Kyle Petty

The 2009 Coke Zero 400 Powered by Coca-Cola was the eighteenth race of the 2009 NASCAR Sprint Cup schedule, marking the halfway point of the season, and the third of four restrictor plate races on the season slate. The 160 lap, 400 miles (640 km) event was held on Saturday night, July 4 (Independence Day in the USA) at the 2.5 miles (4.0 km) Daytona International Speedway in Daytona Beach, Florida. The race was broadcast on TNT with pre-race activities beginning at 6:30 PM US EDT, and radio being handled by Sirius XM Radio (satellite) and MRN (over-the-air) starting at 7 PM US EDT. The green flag waved shortly after 8:15 PM US EDT in front of a live audience of 115,000 people with the checkered flag coming out sometime after 11:08 PM US EDT.

== Historic date ==
This marked the first time that the race was run on Independence Day since 1992. The 1998 event, which was to have been run on Independence Day, was postponed due to the wildfires in Florida that year and was raced in October. The event also commemorated the 25th Anniversary to the date of Richard Petty's 200th – and final – victory in this race in 1984. Before 1988, the race had always been held on the morning of the birthdate of the United States; since then, it has been held on the Saturday night closest to the Independence Day.

== Background ==
- A Federal judge in Charlotte gave a restraining order to Jeremy Mayfield following his appeal of overturning his drug test suspension announced at Darlington before the Southern 500. However, he missed the inspection deadline; it was not clear if he would become a replacement driver in case of an emergency.
- The first 25 nominees for the Charter Class of the NASCAR Hall of Fame were announced. Among them are former Series champions Bobby Allison and Darrell Waltrip, who were the first two nominees announced two days before the formal announcement. A 49-member panel and the fans will select the five enshrinees from those 25 in October, and will be formally inducted during All-Star Race XXVI weekend. Among the other 23 finalists are circuit founder Bill France Sr. and his son, Dale Earnhardt and Richard Petty (who was also nominated along with his father, Lee), the only seven-time winners of the Sprint Cup Series, along with owner Richard Childress, and Benny Parsons and Ned Jarrett, who like Waltrip, both had successful broadcasting careers after retiring as a driver.

== Qualifying ==
Qualifying was rained out for the second straight weekend, so again, the NASCAR rulebook was used to set the order of the field, and Tony Stewart would be on the pole.

Max Papis and the Germain Racing Toyota team and Mike Wallace and the Gunselman Motorsports Toyota team would miss the show.

== Race recap ==
The invocation and the national anthem were preempted in favor of the trailer for the movie G.I. Joe: The Rise of Cobra, causing an outrage among NASCAR fans. The first big one happened in the second half of the race, when Kasey Kahne got into David Stremme, bouncing him off the wall and collecting at least a dozen cars.

Tony Stewart led the most laps, with Denny Hamlin leading the second-most, combining to lead all but eleven of the 160 laps. Like the prior super speedway race at Talladega, a car was wrecked on the last lap. Kyle Busch ended up being the victim of this wreck. Tony Stewart and Kyle Busch made contact, sending Busch spinning hard into the outside wall. After hitting the wall, Busch was rammed hard from behind by Kasey Kahne, destroying Busch's in-car camera. He then was hit hard by his teammate, Joey Logano, on the driver's side.

At least a dozen cars wrecked before and after the start/finish line as the race officially ended under caution, with Stewart picking up his second points race victory of the 2009 season, extending his points lead over Jeff Gordon by 180 points. Eight cautions were handed out by NASCAR officials for a duration of 30 laps; the average green flag run was approximately 14 laps.

Instantly after stopping a stunned, dazed, irritated, impatient Kyle Busch climbed out of his car and tried to follow Tony to victory lane for confrontation but was led away by officials. In victory lane Tony Stewart was unexcited on his victory. He said with a disappointed tone, "Well... I am not proud of what I did back there. I went where I had to go and he went where he had to go. I got into the back of him without thinking... I don't like winning 'em like that. I wish I could enjoy my win but it does not feel good when you have a good day and you wreck someone out of a good day, especially how Kyle helped me the whole race. You want him to have a good day too, and I couldn't just give the win to him so I tried to make my move, he went up to block us and I was already there. I am sorry. I may be too hard on myself but I do not feel like I am... I am sorry but I am thankful for my nice Stewart–Haas Racing team who brought me here today."

When Kyle Busch's friend/boss Joe Gibbs was asked about the finish he said, "I think Kyle did good today. The fact that he gave it all he could and was willing to get us to victory lane shows a true winner in him." Kyle contended that his friend intentionally crashed him but changed his mind in 2010 after a talk with Tony and deciding it was best to put it behind them.

== Results ==
Pos.	No.	Driver	Make	Team
1	14	Tony Stewart	Chevrolet	Stewart–Haas Racing
2	48	Jimmie Johnson	Chevrolet	Hendrick Motorsports
3	11	Denny Hamlin	Toyota	Joe Gibbs Racing
4	99	Carl Edwards	Ford	Roush Fenway Racing
5	2	Kurt Busch	Dodge	Penske Racing
6	47	Marcos Ambrose	Toyota	JTG Daugherty Racing
7	83	Brian Vickers	Toyota	Red Bull Racing Team
8	17	Matt Kenseth	Ford	Roush Fenway Racing
9	42	Juan Pablo Montoya	Chevrolet	Earnhardt Ganassi Racing
10	19	Elliott Sadler	Dodge	Richard Petty Motorsports
11	26	Jamie McMurray	Ford	Roush Fenway Racing
12	78	Regan Smith	Chevrolet	Furniture Row Racing
13	6	David Ragan	Ford	Roush Fenway Racing
14	18	Kyle Busch	Toyota	Joe Gibbs Racing
15	9	Kasey Kahne	Dodge	Richard Petty Motorsports
16	31	Jeff Burton	Chevrolet	Richard Childress Racing
17	44	A. J. Allmendinger	Dodge	Richard Petty Motorsports
18	16	Greg Biffle	Ford	Roush Fenway Racing
19	20	Joey Logano (R)	Toyota	Joe Gibbs Racing
20	39	Ryan Newman	Chevrolet	Stewart–Haas Racing
21	96	Bobby Labonte	Ford	Hall of Fame Racing
22	7	Robby Gordon	Toyota	Robby Gordon Motorsports
23	98	Paul Menard	Ford	Hall of Fame Racing
24	09	Brad Keselowski	Chevrolet	Phoenix Racing
25	1	Martin Truex Jr.	Chevrolet	Earnhardt Ganassi Racing
26	29	Kevin Harvick	Chevrolet	Richard Childress Racing
27	34	John Andretti	Chevrolet	Front Row Motorsports
28	24	Jeff Gordon	Chevrolet	Hendrick Motorsports
29	33	Clint Bowyer	Chevrolet	Richard Childress Racing
30	37	Tony Raines	Chevrolet	Front Row Motorsports
31	82	Scott Speed (R)	Toyota	Red Bull Racing
32	77	Sam Hornish Jr.	Dodge	Penske Racing
33	43	Reed Sorenson	Dodge	Richard Petty Motorsports
34	07	Casey Mears	Chevrolet	Richard Childress Racing
35	12	David Stremme	Dodge	Penske Racing
36	00	David Reutimann	Toyota	Michael Waltrip Racing
37	55	Michael Waltrip	Toyota	Michael Waltrip Racing
38	5	Mark Martin	Chevrolet	Hendrick Motorsports
39	88	Dale Earnhardt Jr.	Chevrolet	Hendrick Motorsports
40	71	David Gilliland	Chevrolet	TRG Motorsports
41	87	Joe Nemechek	Toyota	NEMCO Motorsports
42	36	Patrick Carpentier	Toyota	Tommy Baldwin Racing
43	66	Dave Blaney	Toyota	Prism Motorsports

=== Failed to Qualify ===
- 13 - Max Papis
- 64 - Mike Wallace (withdrew)
