= 2011 Hollywood Casino 400 =

Race details
- Race 30 of 36 in the 2011 NASCAR Sprint Cup Series
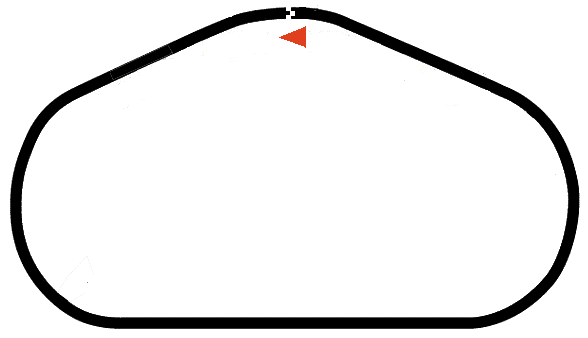
- Kansas Speedway
- Date: October 9, 2011
- Location: Kansas Speedway, Kansas City, Kansas, United States
- Course: Permanent racing facility
- Course length: 1.5 miles (2.4 km)
- Distance: 272 laps, 408 mi (656.612 km)
- Scheduled distance: 267 laps, 400.5 mi (644.542 km)
- Average speed: 137.181 miles per hour (220.771 km/h)

Pole position
Driver	Greg Biffle	Roush Fenway Racing
- Time: 30.877

Most laps led
Driver	Jimmie Johnson	Hendrick Motorsports
- Laps: 197

Winner
No. 48	Jimmie Johnson	Hendrick Motorsports

Television in the United States
- Network: ESPN
- Announcers: Allen Bestwick, Dale Jarrett, and Andy Petree

The 2011 Hollywood Casino 400 was a NASCAR Sprint Cup Series stock car race held on October 9, 2011 at Kansas Speedway in Kansas City, Kansas. Contested over 267 laps (but extended due to a Green-white-checker finish) on the 1.5-mile (2.4 km) asphalt quad-oval, it was the thirtieth race of the 2011 Sprint Cup Series season, as well as the fourth race in the ten-race Chase for the Sprint Cup, which ends the season. Jimmie Johnson of Hendrick Motorsports won the race, his second of the season. Kasey Kahne finished second and Brad Keselowski was third.

== Background ==
Kansas Speedway is one of ten intermediate to hold NASCAR races. The standard track at Kansas Speedway is a four-turn D-shaped oval track that is 1.5 miles (2.4 km) long. The track's turns are banked at fifteen degrees, while the front stretch, the location of the finish line, is 10.4 degrees. The back stretch, opposite of the front, is at only five degrees. The racetrack has seats for 82,000 spectators.

== Race results ==
Pos	Grid	Car	Driver	Team	Manufacturer	Laps	Points
1	19	48	Jimmie Johnson	Hendrick Motorsports	Chevrolet	272	48
2	5	4	Kasey Kahne	Red Bull Racing Team	Toyota	272	42
3	12	2	Brad Keselowski	Penske Racing	Dodge	272	42
4	4	17	Matt Kenseth	Roush Fenway Racing	Ford	272	41
5	2	99	Carl Edwards	Roush Fenway Racing	Ford	272	39
6	14	29	Kevin Harvick	Richard Childress Racing	Chevrolet	272	38
7	24	33	Clint Bowyer	Richard Childress Racing	Chevrolet	272	37
8	1	16	Greg Biffle	Roush Fenway Racing	Ford	272	37
9	21	9	Marcos Ambrose	Richard Petty Motorsports	Ford	272	35
10	9	5	Mark Martin	Hendrick Motorsports	Chevrolet	272	34
11	3	18	Kyle Busch	Joe Gibbs Racing	Toyota	272	34
12	6	27	Paul Menard	Richard Childress Racing	Chevrolet	272	32
13	17	22	Kurt Busch	Penske Racing	Dodge	272	32
14	18	88	Dale Earnhardt Jr.	Hendrick Motorsports	Chevrolet	272	30
15	23	14	Tony Stewart	Stewart–Haas Racing	Chevrolet	272	29
16	7	11	Denny Hamlin	Joe Gibbs Racing	Toyota	272	28
17	41	51	Landon Cassill	Phoenix Racing	Chevrolet	272	0
18	11	39	Ryan Newman	Stewart–Haas Racing	Chevrolet	272	26
19	15	83	Brian Vickers	Red Bull Racing Team	Toyota	271	25
20	13	6	David Ragan	Roush Fenway Racing	Ford	271	24
21	31	31	Jeff Burton	Richard Childress Racing	Chevrolet	271	23
22	29	1	Jamie McMurray	Earnhardt Ganassi Racing	Chevrolet	271	22
23	34	42	Juan Pablo Montoya	Earnhardt Ganassi Racing	Chevrolet	271	21
24	16	78	Regan Smith	Furniture Row Racing	Chevrolet	271	20
25	22	43	A. J. Allmendinger	Richard Petty Motorsports	Ford	270	19
26	26	98	Austin Dillon	Curb Agajanian Performance Group	Chevrolet	270	0
27	36	38	Travis Kvapil	Front Row Motorsports	Ford	270	0
28	42	32	Mike Bliss	FAS Lane Racing	Ford	270	0
29	20	20	Joey Logano	Joe Gibbs Racing	Toyota	270	15
30	33	47	Bobby Labonte	JTG Daugherty Racing	Toyota	269	14
31	38	36	Dave Blaney	Tommy Baldwin Racing	Chevrolet	269	13
32	30	34	David Gilliland	Front Row Motorsports	Ford	268	12
33	25	46	Scott Speed	Whitney Motorsports	Ford	266	0
34	10	24	Jeff Gordon	Hendrick Motorsports	Chevrolet	264	11
35	27	00	David Reutimann	Michael Waltrip Racing	Toyota	264	9
36	8	56	Martin Truex Jr.	Michael Waltrip Racing	Toyota	241	8
37	35	71	Andy Lally	TRG Motorsports	Ford	72	7
38	39	7	Reed Sorenson	Robby Gordon Motorsports	Dodge	37	0
39	40	66	Michael McDowell	HP Racing	Toyota	30	5
40	32	30	David Stremme	Inception Motorsports	Chevrolet	27	4
41	43	87	Joe Nemechek	NEMCO Motorsports	Toyota	18	0
42	37	13	Casey Mears	Germain Racing	Toyota	16	2
43	28	55	J. J. Yeley	Front Row Motorsports	Ford	12	1

== Standings after the race ==
Drivers' Championship standings

	Pos	Driver	Points
1	1	Carl Edwards	2161
1	2	Kevin Harvick	2160 (–1)
2	3	Jimmie Johnson	2157 (–4)
3	4	Brad Keselowski	2150 (–11)
1	5	Matt Kenseth	2149 (–12)
3	6	Kurt Busch	2145 (–16)
3	7	Tony Stewart	2142 (–19)
	8	Kyle Busch	2141 (–20)
1	9	Dale Earnhardt Jr.	2118 (–43)
1	10	Jeff Gordon	2114 (–47)
	11	Ryan Newman	2107 (–54)
	12	Denny Hamlin	2082 (–79)

Previous race: 2011 AAA 400	Sprint Cup Series; 2011 season	Next race: 2011 Bank of America 500
