= 2011 Jeff Byrd 500 =

2011 Jeff Byrd 500 presented by Food City
Race details
- Race 4 of 36 in the 2011 NASCAR Sprint Cup Series
- 2011 Jeff Byrd 500 program cover, celebrating the 50th anniversary since the track first opened and started hosting races.
- Date: March 20, 2011
- Official name: The Jeff Byrd 500
- Location: Bristol Motor Speedway, Bristol, Tennessee
- Course: Permanent racing facility
- Course length: 0.533 miles (0.858 km)
- Distance: 500 laps, 266.5 mi (428.89 km)
- Weather: A few showers with a high around 68; wind out of the ESE at 6 mph.

Pole position
Driver	Carl Edwards	Roush Fenway Racing
- Time: 14.989

Most laps led
Driver	Jimmie Johnson	Hendrick Motorsports
- Laps: 164

Winner
No. 18	Kyle Busch	Joe Gibbs Racing

Television in the United States
- Network: Fox
- Announcers: Mike Joy, Darrell Waltrip and Larry McReynolds

The logo for the 2011 Jeff Byrd 500.

The 2011 Jeff Byrd 500 presented by Food City was a NASCAR Sprint Cup Series stock car race that was held on March 20, 2011, at Bristol Motor Speedway in Bristol, Tennessee. Contested over 500 laps, it was the fourth race of the 2011 NASCAR Sprint Cup Series. The race was won by Kyle Busch for the Joe Gibbs Racing team. Carl Edwards finished second, and Jimmie Johnson clinched third.

There were ten cautions and 17 lead changes among eight different drivers throughout the race. It was Busch's first win of the 2011 season, and the 20th of his career.

== Report ==
=== Background ===
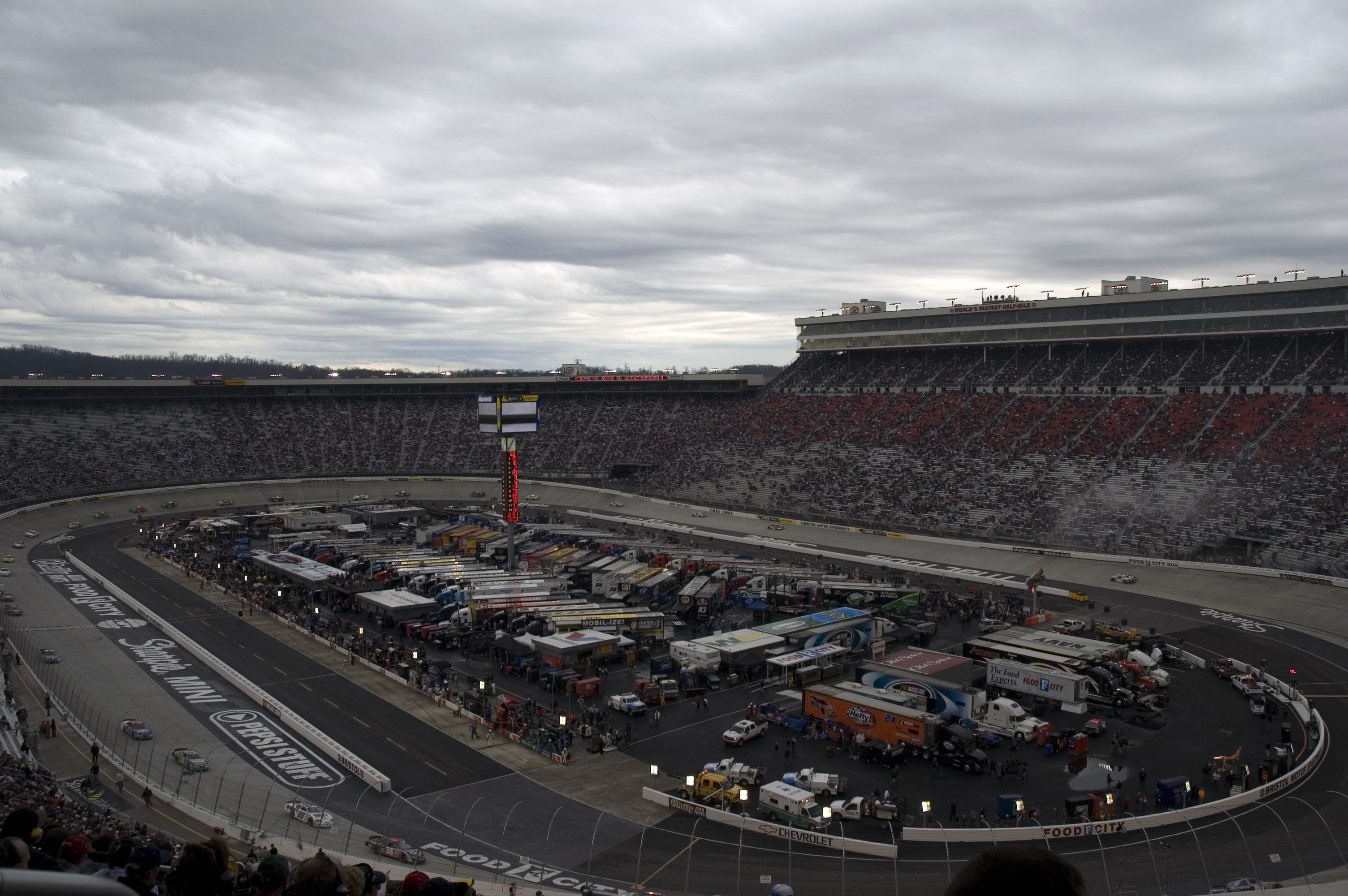
Bristol Motor Speedway, the race track where the race was held.

As a tribute to the late president of the Speedway who died in 2010, longtime race title sponsor K-VA-T Food City, which celebrated the 20th year of race sponsorship in 2011 (as of 2013, the longest continuous sponsorship deal in NASCAR for a race), named the race in his memory.

The track, Bristol Motor Speedway, is one of five short tracks to hold NASCAR races, the others being Richmond International Raceway, Dover International Speedway, Martinsville Speedway, and Phoenix International Raceway. The standard track at Bristol Motor Speedway is a four-turn short track oval that is 0.533 miles (0.858 km) long. The track's turns are banked from twenty-four to thirty degrees, while the front stretch, the location of the finish line, is banked from six to ten degrees. The back stretch also has banking from six to ten degrees.

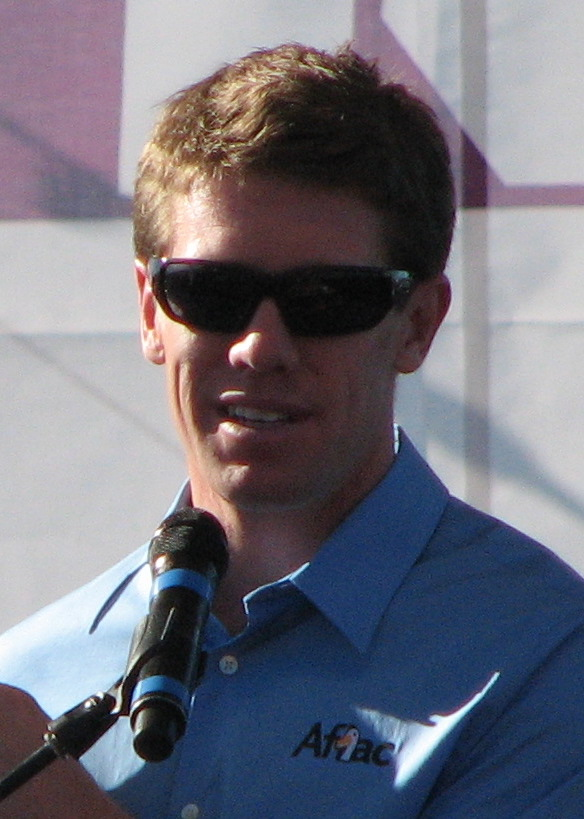
Carl Edwards scored the pole position.

Before the race, Tony Stewart was leading the Drivers' Championship with 113 points, tied with Kyle Busch in second. Carl Edwards and Juan Pablo Montoya followed in third and fourth with 106 points, three ahead of Ryan Newman and ten ahead of Paul Menard in fifth and sixth. Martin Truex Jr. in seventh had 95, the same number of points as Denny Hamlin in eighth. They were one point ahead of A. J. Allmendinger in ninth, while Dale Earnhardt Jr. was tenth with 91. In the Manufacturers' Championship, Ford was leading with 21 points, three ahead of Toyota in second. Chevrolet was placed in third with 16 points, while Dodge followed with 11. Jimmie Johnson was the race's defending winner from 2010.

=== Practice and qualifying ===
Three practice sessions were held before the race; the first on Friday, which lasted 90 minutes. The second and third were both on Saturday afternoon, and lasted 45 minutes each. Edwards was quickest with a time of 14.912 seconds in the first session, 0.076 seconds faster than Johnson. Greg Biffle was just off Johnson's pace, followed by Kasey Kahne, Menard, and David Ragan. Kyle Busch was seventh, still within a second of Edwards' time.

Forty-four cars were entered for qualifying, but only forty-three could qualify for the race because of NASCAR's qualifying procedure. Edwards clinched the 9th pole position of his career, with a time of 14.989 seconds. He was joined on the front row of the grid by Biffle. Regan Smith qualified third, Menard took fourth, and Ragan started fifth. Johnson, Jeff Gordon, Truex, Mark Martin and Kahne rounded out the top ten. The driver that failed to qualify for the race was Ken Schrader. Once the qualifying session concluded, Edwards stated, "I'm enjoying this. I'm having fun. I'm hoping it lasts, and I'm going to keep driving the way I'm driving until we win a championship, or this car won't go as fast."

In the second practice session, Stewart was fastest with a time of 15.364 seconds, more than six hundredths of a second quicker than second-placed Reutimann. Martin took third place, ahead of Jamie McMurray, Kurt Busch and Jeff Burton. In the third and final practice, Martin was quickest with a time of 15.472 seconds. Brian Vickers followed in second, ahead of Hamlin and Joey Logano. Stewart, who was first in the second practice, was fifth quickest, with a time of 15.570 seconds. Montoya, Gordon, Truex, Menard, and Kurt Busch rounded out the first ten positions.

=== Race ===
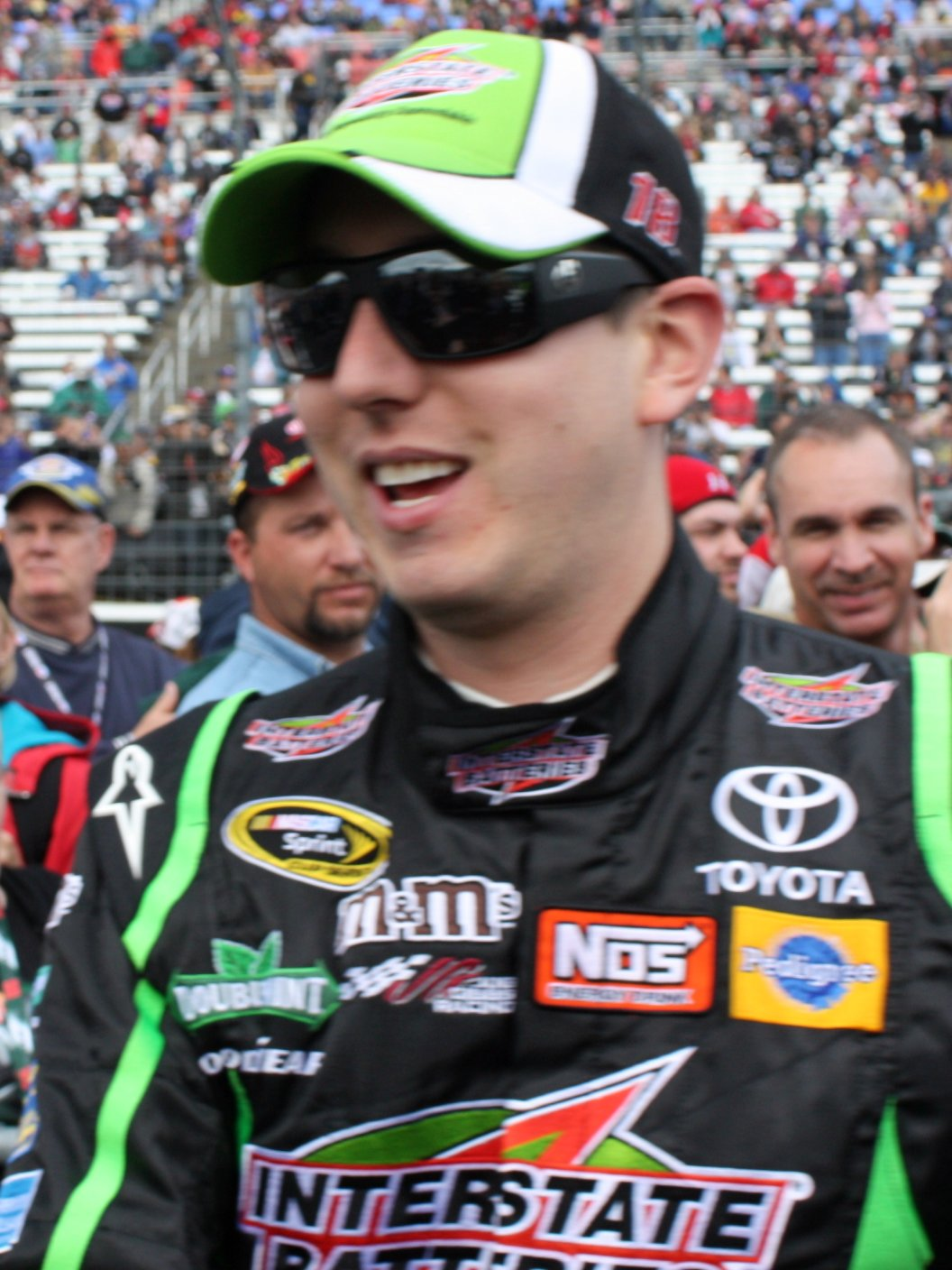
Kyle Busch won the race.

The race, the fourth of the season, began at 1:00 p.m. EDT and was televised live in the United States on Fox. The conditions on the grid were dry before the race, the air temperature at 60 °F (16 °C); mostly cloudy skies were expected. Mike Rife, reverend of the Vansant Church of Christ, began pre-race ceremonies with the invocation. Actor and country music singer Billy Ray Cyrus performed the national anthem, while Claudia Byrd, Christian Byrd and Belton Caldwell gave the command for drivers to start their engines.

== Results ==
=== Qualifying ===
Grid	No.	Driver	Team	Manufacturer	Time	Speed
1	99	Carl Edwards	Roush Fenway Racing	Ford	14.989	128.014
2	16	Greg Biffle	Roush Fenway Racing	Ford	15.035	127.622
3	78	Regan Smith	Furniture Row Racing	Chevrolet	15.040	127.580
4	27	Paul Menard	Richard Childress Racing	Chevrolet	15.045	127.537
5	6	David Ragan	Roush Fenway Racing	Ford	15.055	127.453
6	48	Jimmie Johnson	Hendrick Motorsports	Chevrolet	15.059	127.419
7	24	Jeff Gordon	Hendrick Motorsports	Chevrolet	15.076	127.275
8	56	Martin Truex Jr.	Michael Waltrip Racing	Toyota	15.104	127.039
9	5	Mark Martin	Hendrick Motorsports	Chevrolet	15.108	127.006
10	4	Kasey Kahne	Red Bull Racing Team	Toyota	15.115	126.947
11	17	Matt Kenseth	Roush Fenway Racing	Ford	15.121	126.896
12	18	Kyle Busch	Joe Gibbs Racing	Toyota	15.123	126.880
13	14	Tony Stewart	Stewart–Haas Racing	Chevrolet	15.129	126.829
14	9	Marcos Ambrose	Richard Petty Motorsports	Ford	15.131	126.812
15	29	Kevin Harvick	Richard Childress Racing	Chevrolet	15.150	126.654
16	47	Bobby Labonte	JTG Daugherty Racing	Toyota	15.152	126.637
17	31	Jeff Burton	Richard Childress Racing	Chevrolet	15.171	126.478
18	20	Joey Logano	Joe Gibbs Racing	Toyota	15.171	126.478
19	21	Trevor Bayne	Wood Brothers Racing	Ford	15.174	126.453
20	22	Kurt Busch	Penske Racing	Dodge	15.181	126.395
21	39	Ryan Newman	Stewart–Haas Racing	Chevrolet	15.181	126.395
22	88	Dale Earnhardt Jr.	Hendrick Motorsports	Chevrolet	15.191	126.312
23	2	Brad Keselowski	Penske Racing	Dodge	15.215	126.112
24	1	Jamie McMurray	Earnhardt Ganassi Racing	Chevrolet	15.216	126.104
25	11	Denny Hamlin	Joe Gibbs Racing	Toyota	15.219	126.079
26	00	David Reutimann	Michael Waltrip Racing	Toyota	15.228	126.005
27	33	Clint Bowyer	Richard Childress Racing	Chevrolet	15.233	125.963
28	43	A. J. Allmendinger	Richard Petty Motorsports	Ford	15.257	125.765
29	34	David Gilliland	Front Row Motorsports	Ford	15.258	125.757
30	83	Brian Vickers	Red Bull Racing Team	Toyota	15.276	125.609
31	09	Bill Elliott	Phoenix Racing	Chevrolet	15.325	125.207
32	60	Landon Cassill	Germain Racing	Toyota	15.336	125.117
33	7	Robby Gordon	Robby Gordon Motorsports	Toyota	15.371	124.832
34	87	Joe Nemechek	NEMCO Motorsports	Toyota	15.414	124.484
35	38	Travis Kvapil	Front Row Motorsports	Ford	15.436	124.307
36	42	Juan Pablo Montoya	Earnhardt Ganassi Racing	Chevrolet	15.437	124.299
37	36	Dave Blaney	Tommy Baldwin Racing	Chevrolet	15.462	124.098
38	46	J. J. Yeley	Whitney Motorsports	Chevrolet	15.473	124.010
39	66	Michael McDowell	HP Racing	Toyota	15.475	123.993
40	92	Dennis Setzer	K-Automotive Motorsports	Dodge	15.565	123.277
41	37	Tony Raines	Front Row Motorsports	Ford	15.616	15.616
42	71	Andy Lally	TRG Motorsports	Chevrolet	15.869	120.915
43	13	Casey Mears	Germain Racing	Toyota	15.610	122.921
	Failed to Qualify					
	32	Ken Schrader	FAS Lane Racing	Ford	15.660	122.529
	Source:					

=== Race results ===
Pos	Car	Driver	Team	Manufacturer	Laps Run	Points
1	18	Kyle Busch	Joe Gibbs Racing	Toyota	500	47
2	99	Carl Edwards	Roush Fenway Racing	Ford	500	43
3	48	Jimmie Johnson	Hendrick Motorsports	Chevrolet	500	43
4	17	Matt Kenseth	Roush Fenway Racing	Ford	500	40
5	27	Paul Menard	Richard Childress Racing	Chevrolet	500	40
6	29	Kevin Harvick	Richard Childress Racing	Chevrolet	500	39
7	22	Kurt Busch	Penske Racing	Dodge	500	37
8	16	Greg Biffle	Roush Fenway Racing	Ford	500	36
9	4	Kasey Kahne	Red Bull Racing Team	Toyota	500	35
10	39	Ryan Newman	Stewart–Haas Racing	Chevrolet	500	35
11	88	Dale Earnhardt Jr.	Hendrick Motorsports	Chevrolet	500	33
12	5	Mark Martin	Hendrick Motorsports	Chevrolet	500	32
13	47	Bobby Labonte	JTG Daugherty Racing	Toyota	500	31
14	24	Jeff Gordon	Hendrick Motorsports	Chevrolet	500	30
15	9	Marcos Ambrose	Richard Petty Motorsports	Ford	500	29
16	6	David Ragan	Roush Fenway Racing	Ford	500	28
17	56	Martin Truex Jr.	Michael Waltrip Racing	Toyota	500	28
18	2	Brad Keselowski	Penske Racing	Dodge	500	26
19	14	Tony Stewart	Stewart–Haas Racing	Chevrolet	500	25
20	31	Jeff Burton	Richard Childress Racing	Chevrolet	498	24
21	1	Jamie McMurray	Earnhardt Ganassi Racing	Chevrolet	498	23
22	78	Regan Smith	Furniture Row Racing	Chevrolet	498	22
23	20	Joey Logano	Joe Gibbs Racing	Toyota	497	21
24	42	Juan Pablo Montoya	Earnhardt Ganassi Racing	Chevrolet	497	20
25	36	Dave Blaney	Tommy Baldwin Racing	Chevrolet	497	19
26	38	Travis Kvapil	Front Row Motorsports	Ford	496	0
27	34	David Gilliland	Front Row Motorsports	Ford	495	18
28	37	Tony Raines	Front Row Motorsports	Ford	494	16
29	09	Bill Elliott	Phoenix Racing	Chevrolet	493	15
30	00	David Reutimann	Michael Waltrip Racing	Toyota	493	14
31	43	A. J. Allmendinger	Richard Petty Motorsports	Ford	493	13
32	71	Andy Lally	TRG Motorsports	Ford	491	12
33	11	Denny Hamlin	Joe Gibbs Racing	Toyota	488	11
34	21	Trevor Bayne	Wood Brothers Racing	Ford	482	0
35	33	Clint Bowyer	Richard Childress Racing	Chevrolet	456	9
36	83	Brian Vickers	Red Bull Racing Team	Toyota	441	8
37	13	Casey Mears	Germain Racing	Toyota	427	7
38	92	Dennis Setzer	K-Automotive Motorsports	Chevrolet	336	0
39	7	Robby Gordon	Robby Gordon Motorsports	Dodge	127	5
40	46	J. J. Yeley	Whitney Motorsports	Ford	97	4
41	87	Joe Nemechek	NEMCO Motorsports	Toyota	72	0
42	60	Landon Cassill	Germain Racing	Toyota	36	0
43	66	Michael McDowell	HP Racing	Toyota	35	1

== Standings after the race ==
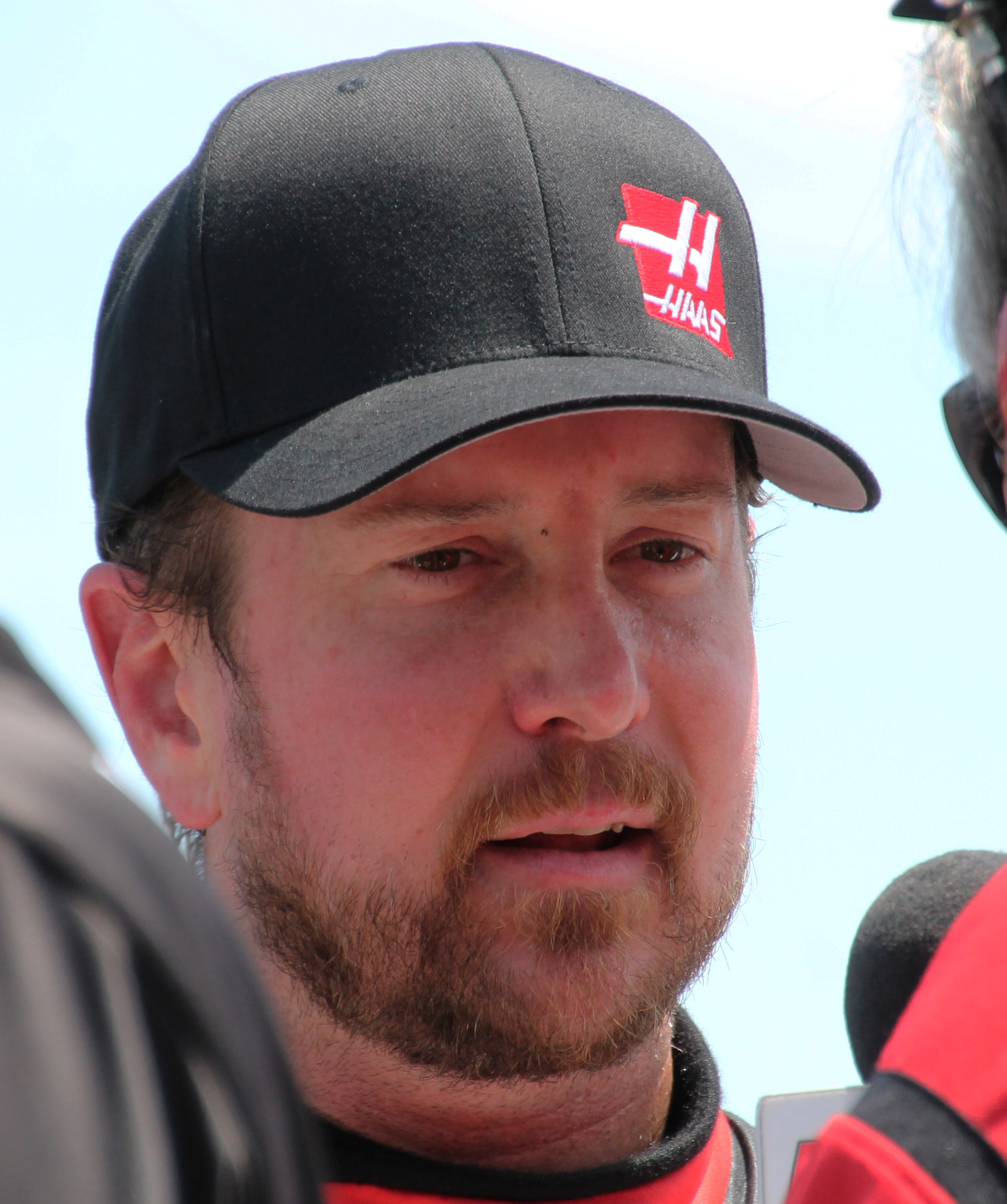
Kurt Busch led the point standings after the race with a total of 150 (pictured in 2015).

Drivers' Championship standings
Pos	Driver	Points
1	Kurt Busch	150
2	Carl Edwards	149
3	Tony Stewart	138
4	Ryan Newman	138
5	Paul Menard	136

Manufacturers' Championship standings
Pos	Manufacturer	Points
1	Ford	27
2	Toyota	25
3	Chevrolet	22
4	Dodge	14

- Note: Only the top five positions are included for the driver standings.

Previous race: 2011 Kobalt Tools 400	Sprint Cup Series; 2011 season	Next race: 2011 Auto Club 400
