= 2015 Food City 500 =

2015 Food City 500 In Support Of Steve Byrnes And Stand Up To Cancer
Race details
- Race 8 of 36 in the 2015 NASCAR Sprint Cup Series
- 2015 Food City 500 program cover
- Date: April 19, 2015
- Location: Bristol Motor Speedway in Bristol, Tennessee
- Course: Permanent racing facility
- Course length: 0.533 miles (0.858 km)
- Distance: 511 laps, 272.363 mi (438.326 km)
- Scheduled distance: 500 laps, 266.5 mi (428.89 km)
- Weather: Rain and cloudy skies with a temperature of 64 °F (18 °C); wind out of the northeast at 11 mph (18 km/h)
- Average speed: 74.997 mph (120.696 km/h)

Pole position
Driver	Matt Kenseth	Joe Gibbs Racing
- Time: 14.917

Most laps led
Driver	Kevin Harvick	Stewart–Haas Racing
- Laps: 184

Winner
No. 20	Matt Kenseth	Joe Gibbs Racing

Television in the United States
- Network: Fox
- Announcers: Mike Joy, Larry McReynolds and Darrell Waltrip
- Nielsen ratings: 2.9/6 (overnight); 2.9/6 (final); 2.6 million viewers

Radio in the United States
- Radio: PRN
- Booth announcers: Doug Rice, Mark Garrow and Wendy Venturini
- Turn announcers: Rob Albright (Backstretch)

The 2015 Food City 500 In Support Of Steve Byrnes And Stand Up To Cancer was a NASCAR Sprint Cup Series race held on April 19, 2015, at Bristol Motor Speedway in Bristol, Tennessee. Contested over 511 laps—extended from 500 laps due to a green–white–checker finish—on the 0.533-mile (0.858-kilometre) concrete short track, it was the eighth race of the 2015 NASCAR Sprint Cup Series season. Matt Kenseth won the race – his first victory since 2013 – while Jimmie Johnson and Jeff Gordon finished second and third. Ricky Stenhouse Jr. and Ryan Newman rounded out the top five.

Kenseth won the pole for the race and led 47 laps. Kevin Harvick led a race high 184 laps before getting caught in a late race wreck and finished outside the top ten for the first time in 2015. The race had 21 lead changes among six different drivers, as well as eleven caution flag periods for 117 laps. The race was also stopped three times, for a total duration of 4 hours and 36 minutes for rain.

Kenseth's victory – his 32nd in Sprint Cup – ended a 51-race winless streak commencing after his victory at the 2013 Sylvania 300. It was his fourth win at Bristol and the eighth at the track for Joe Gibbs Racing. The win moved Kenseth up to eighth in the points standings. Despite the win, Toyota still trailed Chevrolet by 46–points in the manufacturer standings.

The race was carried by Fox Sports on the broadcast Fox network for the American television audience, while the radio broadcast was carried by the Performance Racing Network and Sirius XM NASCAR Radio.

== Report ==
=== Background ===
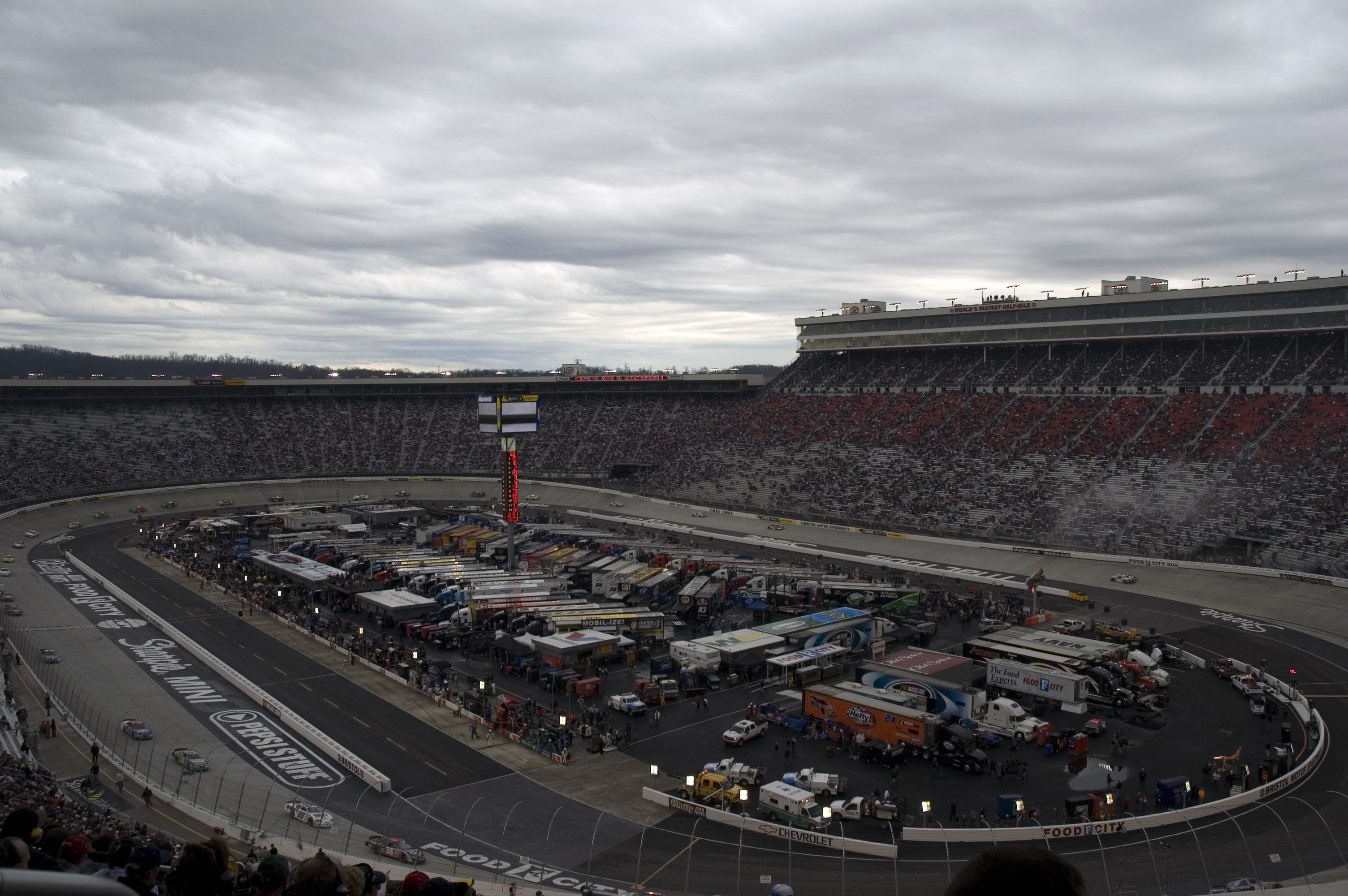
Bristol Motor Speedway, the track where the race was held.

Bristol Motor Speedway, formerly known as Bristol International Raceway and Bristol Raceway, is a NASCAR short track venue located in Bristol, Tennessee. Constructed in 1960, it held its first NASCAR race on July 30, 1961. Despite its short length, Bristol is among the most popular tracks on the NASCAR schedule because of its distinct features, which include extraordinarily steep banking, an all concrete surface, two pit roads, and stadium-like seating.

Kevin Harvick entered Bristol with a 26-point lead over Joey Logano, with Martin Truex Jr. a further 14 points in arrears in third place. Brad Keselowski entered 60 back in fourth place, while Kasey Kahne completed the top five in the championship standings, 76 behind Harvick.

==== Changes to the track ====
In the wake of Kyle Busch's double leg-breaking crash in February's Alert Today Florida 300 at Daytona International Speedway, Bristol Motor Speedway announced on April 3 that SAFER barriers had been installed along the entire circumference of the outer wall. Previously, the track had barriers only in the turns. Track general manager Jerry Caldwell stated that "the safety of our fans and competitors continues to be a focal point for Bristol Motor Speedway" and that the circuit was "able to secure an additional 600 feet of SAFER barriers and will complete the build out of the front and backstretch outside walls before the Food City 500 race weekend".

==== Name change ====
On April 10, Bristol Motor Speedway announced that the Food City 500 would be renamed the Food City 500 In Support of Steve Byrnes and Stand Up to Cancer. This change was made to honor longtime NASCAR broadcaster Steve Byrnes who was battling head and neck cancer. "We stand with the NASCAR community in being Steve Byrnes Strong," said President and CEO of Food City, Steve Smith. "By banding together, we can drive even more awareness and support for our friend Steve, his family and everyone who Stands Up to Cancer." Byrnes died two days after the race.

==== Entry list ====
The entry list for the Food City 500 was released on Monday, April 13, 2015, at 11:21 a.m. Eastern time. Forty-five cars were entered for the race. The only new entry that was not entered for the previous week's race at Texas Motor Speedway was Ron Hornaday Jr. in the No. 30 Chevrolet by The Motorsports Group.

No.	Driver	Team	Manufacturer
1	Jamie McMurray	Chip Ganassi Racing	Chevrolet
2	Brad Keselowski (PC3)	Team Penske	Ford
3	Austin Dillon	Richard Childress Racing	Chevrolet
4	Kevin Harvick (PC1)	Stewart–Haas Racing	Chevrolet
5	Kasey Kahne	Hendrick Motorsports	Chevrolet
6	Trevor Bayne	Roush Fenway Racing	Ford
7	Alex Bowman	Tommy Baldwin Racing	Chevrolet
9	Sam Hornish Jr.	Richard Petty Motorsports	Ford
10	Danica Patrick	Stewart–Haas Racing	Chevrolet
11	Denny Hamlin	Joe Gibbs Racing	Toyota
13	Casey Mears	Germain Racing	Chevrolet
14	Tony Stewart (PC4)	Stewart–Haas Racing	Chevrolet
15	Clint Bowyer	Michael Waltrip Racing	Toyota
16	Greg Biffle	Roush Fenway Racing	Ford
17	Ricky Stenhouse Jr.	Roush Fenway Racing	Ford
18	David Ragan	Joe Gibbs Racing	Toyota
19	Carl Edwards	Joe Gibbs Racing	Toyota
20	Matt Kenseth (PC6)	Joe Gibbs Racing	Toyota
22	Joey Logano	Team Penske	Ford
23	J. J. Yeley (i)	BK Racing	Toyota
24	Jeff Gordon (PC7)	Hendrick Motorsports	Chevrolet
26	Jeb Burton (R)	BK Racing	Toyota
27	Paul Menard	Richard Childress Racing	Chevrolet
30	Ron Hornaday Jr.	The Motorsports Group	Chevrolet
31	Ryan Newman	Richard Childress Racing	Chevrolet
32	Mike Bliss (i)	Go FAS Racing	Ford
33	Alex Kennedy	Hillman-Circle Sport LLC	Chevrolet
34	Chris Buescher (i)	Front Row Motorsports	Ford
35	Cole Whitt	Front Row Motorsports	Ford
38	David Gilliland	Front Row Motorsports	Ford
40	Landon Cassill (i)	Hillman-Circle Sport LLC	Chevrolet
41	Kurt Busch (PC5)	Stewart–Haas Racing	Chevrolet
42	Kyle Larson	Chip Ganassi Racing	Chevrolet
43	Aric Almirola	Richard Petty Motorsports	Ford
46	Michael Annett	HScott Motorsports	Chevrolet
47	A. J. Allmendinger	JTG Daugherty Racing	Chevrolet
48	Jimmie Johnson (PC2)	Hendrick Motorsports	Chevrolet
51	Justin Allgaier	HScott Motorsports	Chevrolet
55	Brett Moffitt (R)	Michael Waltrip Racing	Toyota
62	Brendan Gaughan (i)	Premium Motorsports	Chevrolet
78	Martin Truex Jr.	Furniture Row Racing	Chevrolet
83	Matt DiBenedetto (R)	BK Racing	Toyota
88	Dale Earnhardt Jr.	Hendrick Motorsports	Chevrolet
95	Michael McDowell	Leavine Family Racing	Ford
98	Josh Wise	Phil Parsons Racing	Ford
Official entry list

Key	Meaning
(R)	Rookie
(i)	Ineligible for points
(PC#)	Past champions' provisional

== First practice ==
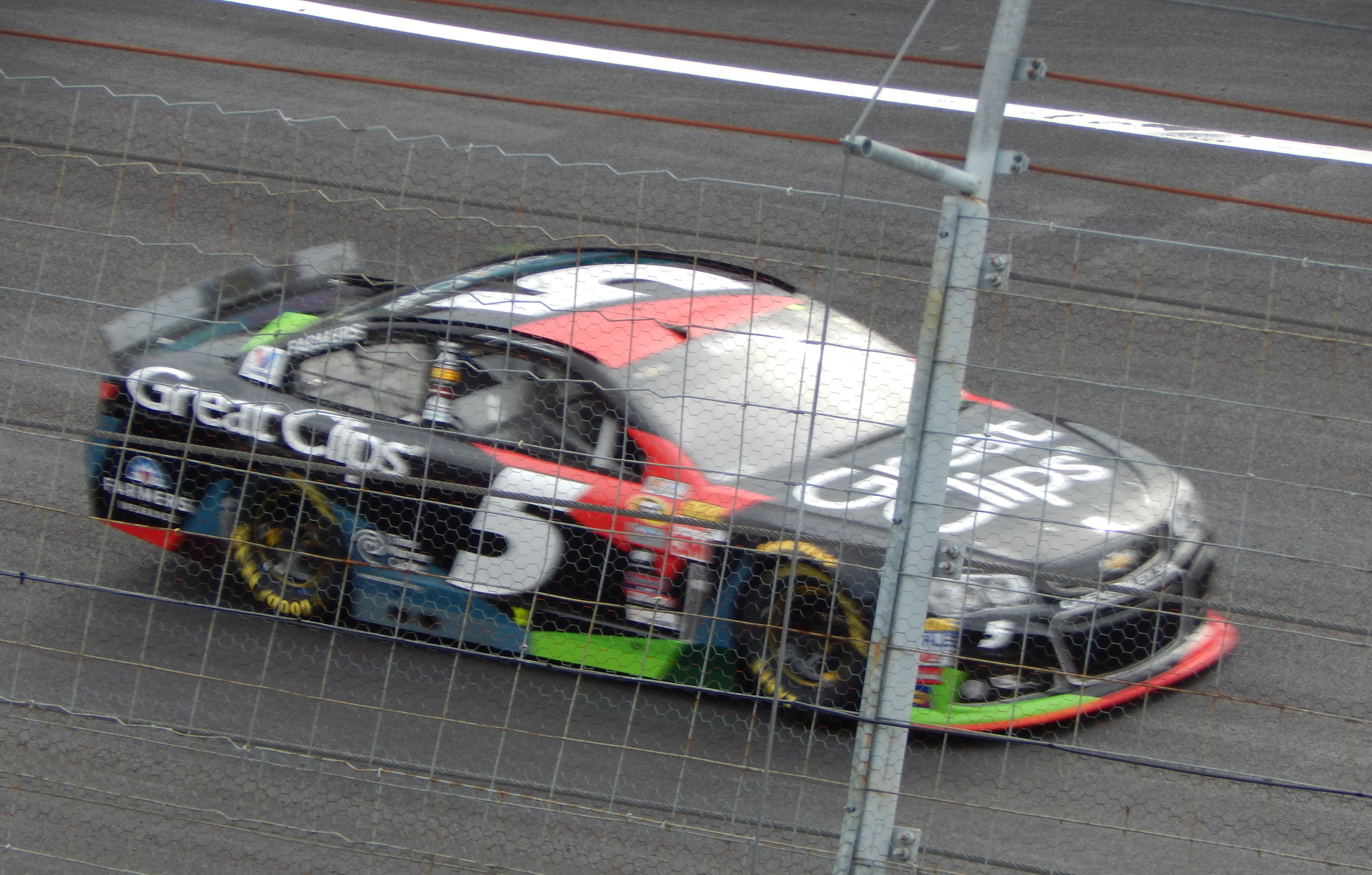
Kasey Kahne was the fastest in the first practice session.

Kasey Kahne was the fastest in the first practice session with a time of 14.971 and a speed of 128.168 mph (206.266 km/h).

Pos	No.	Driver	Team	Manufacturer	Time	Speed
1	5	Kasey Kahne	Hendrick Motorsports	Chevrolet	14.971	128.168
2	88	Dale Earnhardt Jr.	Hendrick Motorsports	Chevrolet	14.972	128.159
3	2	Brad Keselowski	Team Penske	Ford	14.994	127.971
Official first practice results

== Qualifying ==
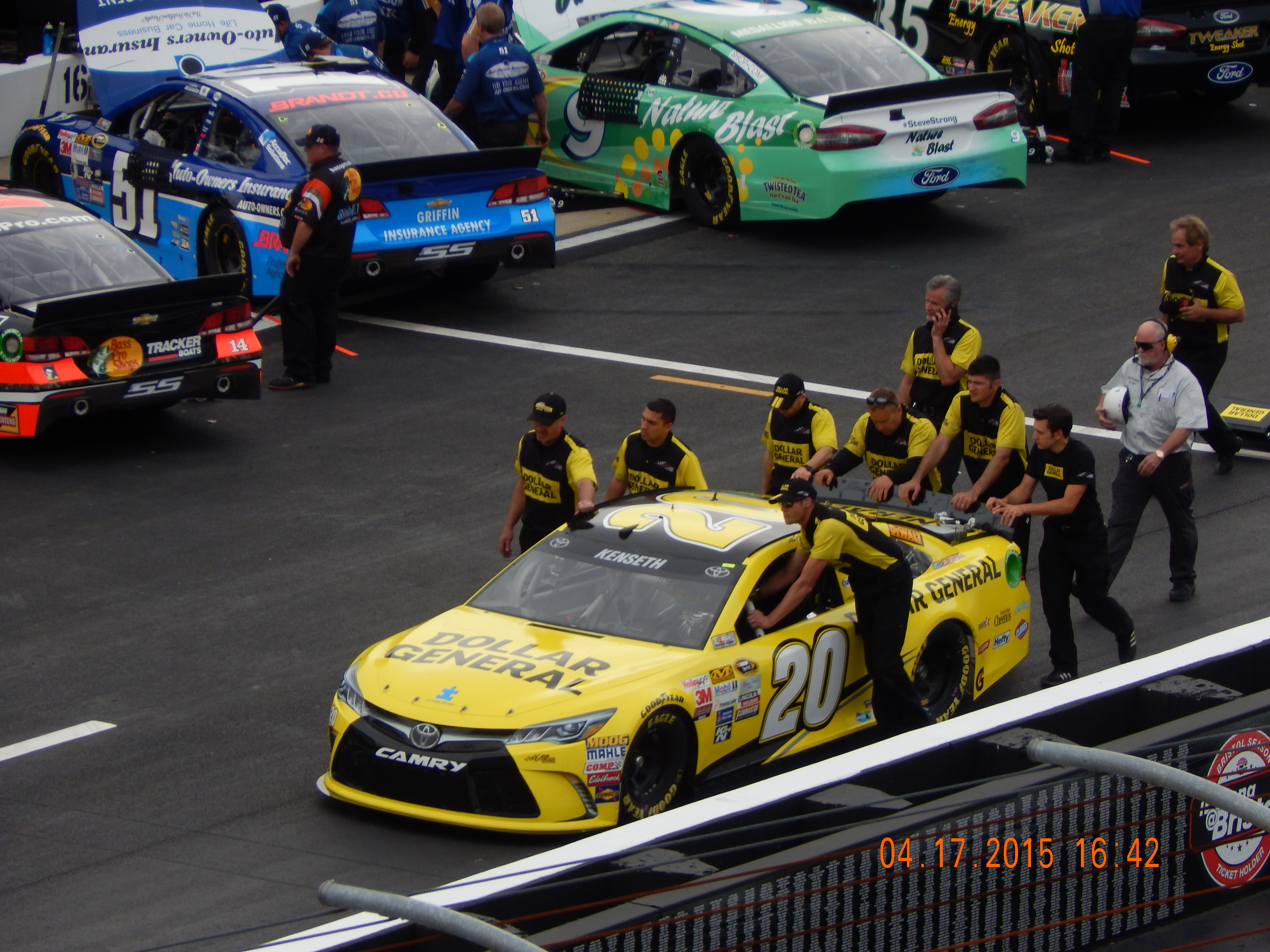
Matt Kenseth won the pole for the Food City 500.

Matt Kenseth won the pole with a time of 14.917 and a speed of 128.632 mph (207.013 km/h). "I got it all that first lap," Kenseth said. "Good job. That was about as good as we were going to get...it was the best we could do with what we got. It was our best lap of the day". Brad Keselowski stated that it was "still very, very early in the weekend and the track is really not indicative of what we're gonna have to race", but joined Kenseth on the front row, 0.022 seconds behind in second place; but Keselowski was looking forward to "a great spot on pit road to help us all day on Sunday". Despite missing out on the top-12 pole shootout in 13th place, Dale Earnhardt Jr. advised that he and his team "will be very good this weekend" and all they had to do was "to improve how the car drives". With 45 entrants, Brendan Gaughan and Ron Hornaday Jr. failed to qualify for the race.

=== Qualifying results ===
Pos	No.	Driver	Team	Manufacturer	R1	R2	R3
1	20	Matt Kenseth	Joe Gibbs Racing	Toyota	14.928	14.953	14.917
2	2	Brad Keselowski	Team Penske	Ford	14.926	15.006	14.939
3	19	Carl Edwards	Joe Gibbs Racing	Toyota	15.036	15.026	14.953
4	4	Kevin Harvick	Stewart–Haas Racing	Chevrolet	15.019	14.978	14.966
5	11	Denny Hamlin	Joe Gibbs Racing	Toyota	15.109	15.050	15.059
6	22	Joey Logano	Team Penske	Ford	14.841	14.938	15.071
7	41	Kurt Busch	Stewart–Haas Racing	Chevrolet	15.123	14.992	15.124
8	5	Kasey Kahne	Hendrick Motorsports	Chevrolet	14.938	15.043	15.129
9	27	Paul Menard	Richard Childress Racing	Chevrolet	15.068	15.032	15.129
10	1	Jamie McMurray	Chip Ganassi Racing	Chevrolet	15.169	15.073	15.155
11	18	David Ragan	Joe Gibbs Racing	Toyota	14.918	15.083	15.176
12	3	Austin Dillon	Richard Childress Racing	Chevrolet	14.998	15.073	15.197
13	88	Dale Earnhardt Jr.	Hendrick Motorsports	Chevrolet	15.049	15.099	—
14	42	Kyle Larson	Chip Ganassi Racing	Chevrolet	15.112	15.100	—
15	51	Justin Allgaier	HScott Motorsports	Chevrolet	15.054	15.161	—
16	78	Martin Truex Jr.	Furniture Row Racing	Chevrolet	15.160	15.168	—
17	40	Landon Cassill (i)	Hillman-Circle Sport LLC	Chevrolet	15.139	15.177	—
18	31	Ryan Newman	Richard Childress Racing	Chevrolet	15.083	15.218	—
19	95	Michael McDowell (Note: Michael McDowell dropped to the rear for unapproved adjustments.)	Leavine Family Racing	Ford	15.139	15.235	—
20	47	A. J. Allmendinger	JTG Daugherty Racing	Chevrolet	15.117	15.236	—
21	14	Tony Stewart	Stewart–Haas Racing	Chevrolet	15.068	15.249	—
22	83	Matt DiBenedetto (R)	BK Racing	Toyota	15.091	15.253	—
23	24	Jeff Gordon	Hendrick Motorsports	Chevrolet	15.003	15.276	—
24	55	Brett Moffitt (R)	Michael Waltrip Racing	Toyota	15.052	15.326	—
25	17	Ricky Stenhouse Jr.	Roush Fenway Racing	Ford	15.183	—	—
26	10	Danica Patrick	Stewart–Haas Racing	Chevrolet	15.189	—	—
27	13	Casey Mears	Germain Racing	Chevrolet	15.192	—	—
28	48	Jimmie Johnson	Hendrick Motorsports	Chevrolet	15.211	—	—
29	23	J. J. Yeley (i)	BK Racing	Toyota	15.223	—	—
30	43	Aric Almirola	Richard Petty Motorsports	Ford	15.250	—	—
31	6	Trevor Bayne	Roush Fenway Racing	Ford	15.253	—	—
32	38	David Gilliland	Front Row Motorsports	Ford	15.274	—	—
33	16	Greg Biffle	Roush Fenway Racing	Ford	15.283	—	—
34	26	Jeb Burton (R)	BK Racing	Toyota	15.288	—	—
35	98	Josh Wise	Phil Parsons Racing	Ford	15.295	—	—
36	46	Michael Annett	HScott Motorsports	Chevrolet	15.331	—	—
37	15	Clint Bowyer	Michael Waltrip Racing	Toyota	15.348	—	—
38	34	Chris Buescher (i)	Front Row Motorsports	Ford	15.348	—	—
39	9	Sam Hornish Jr.	Richard Petty Motorsports	Ford	15.358	—	—
40	7	Alex Bowman	Tommy Baldwin Racing	Chevrolet	15.405	—	—
41	32	Mike Bliss (i)	Go FAS Racing	Ford	15.458	—	—
42	35	Cole Whitt	Front Row Motorsports	Ford	15.468	—	—
43	33	Alex Kennedy (R)	Hillman-Circle Sport LLC	Chevrolet	15.523	—	—
Failed to qualify
44	62	Brendan Gaughan	Premium Motorsports	Chevrolet	15.470	—	—
45	30	Ron Hornaday Jr.	The Motorsports Group	Chevrolet	15.514	—	—
Official qualifying results

== Practice (post-qualifying) ==
=== Second practice ===
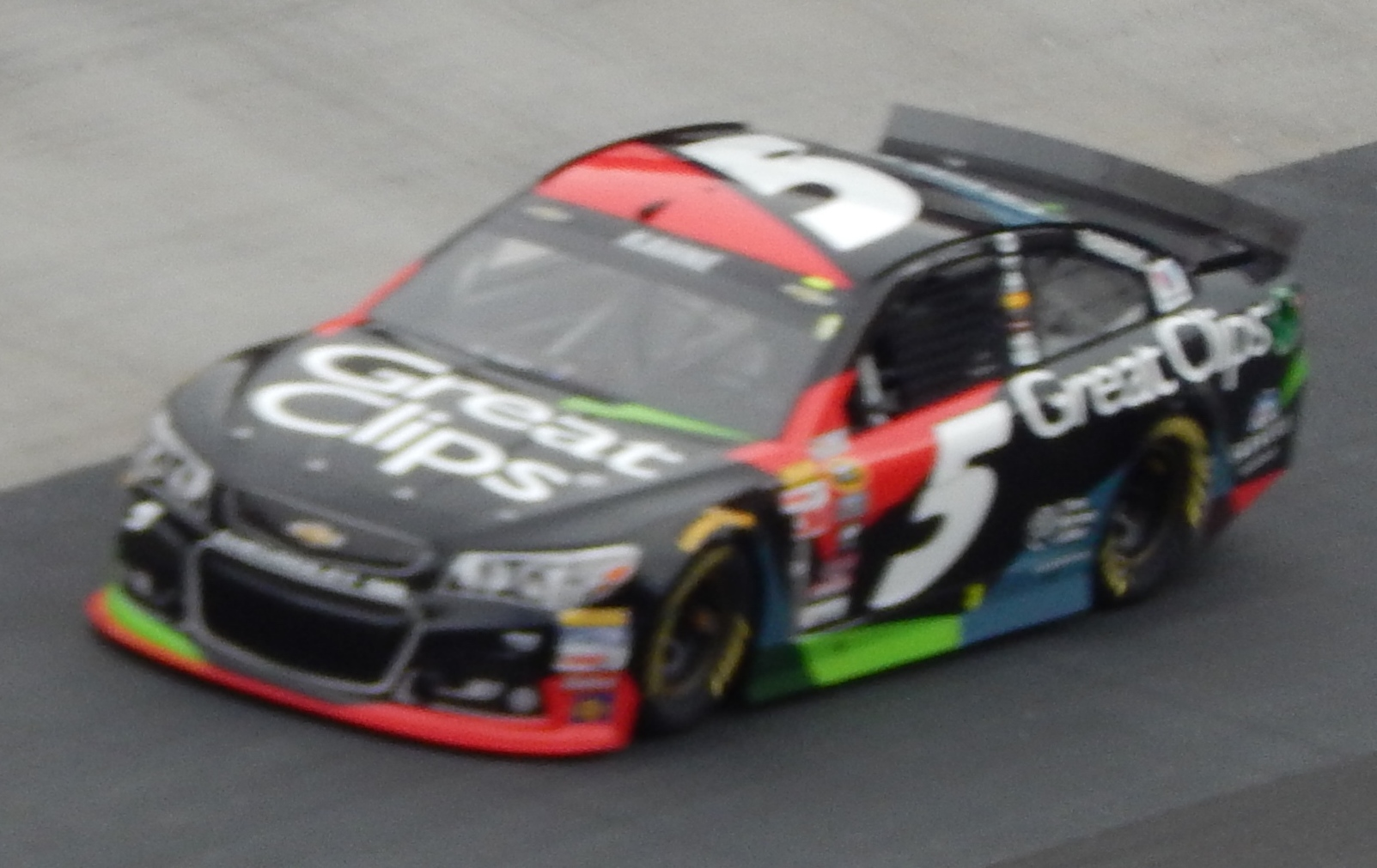
Kasey Kahne was the fastest in the second practice session.

Kasey Kahne was the fastest in the second practice with a time of 15.129 and a speed of 126.829 mph (204.111 km/h). During the session, Tony Stewart tagged the wall with the right-rear corner of his car. The damage was minor and he returned to the track to finish the session. Towards the end of the session, Ricky Stenhouse Jr. made contact with Carl Edwards. The damage was also minor and both cars returned to the session.

Pos	No.	Driver	Team	Manufacturer	Time	Speed
1	5	Kasey Kahne	Hendrick Motorsports	Chevrolet	15.129	126.829
2	4	Kevin Harvick	Stewart–Haas Racing	Chevrolet	15.181	126.395
3	22	Joey Logano	Team Penske	Ford	15.212	126.137
Official second practice results

=== Final practice ===
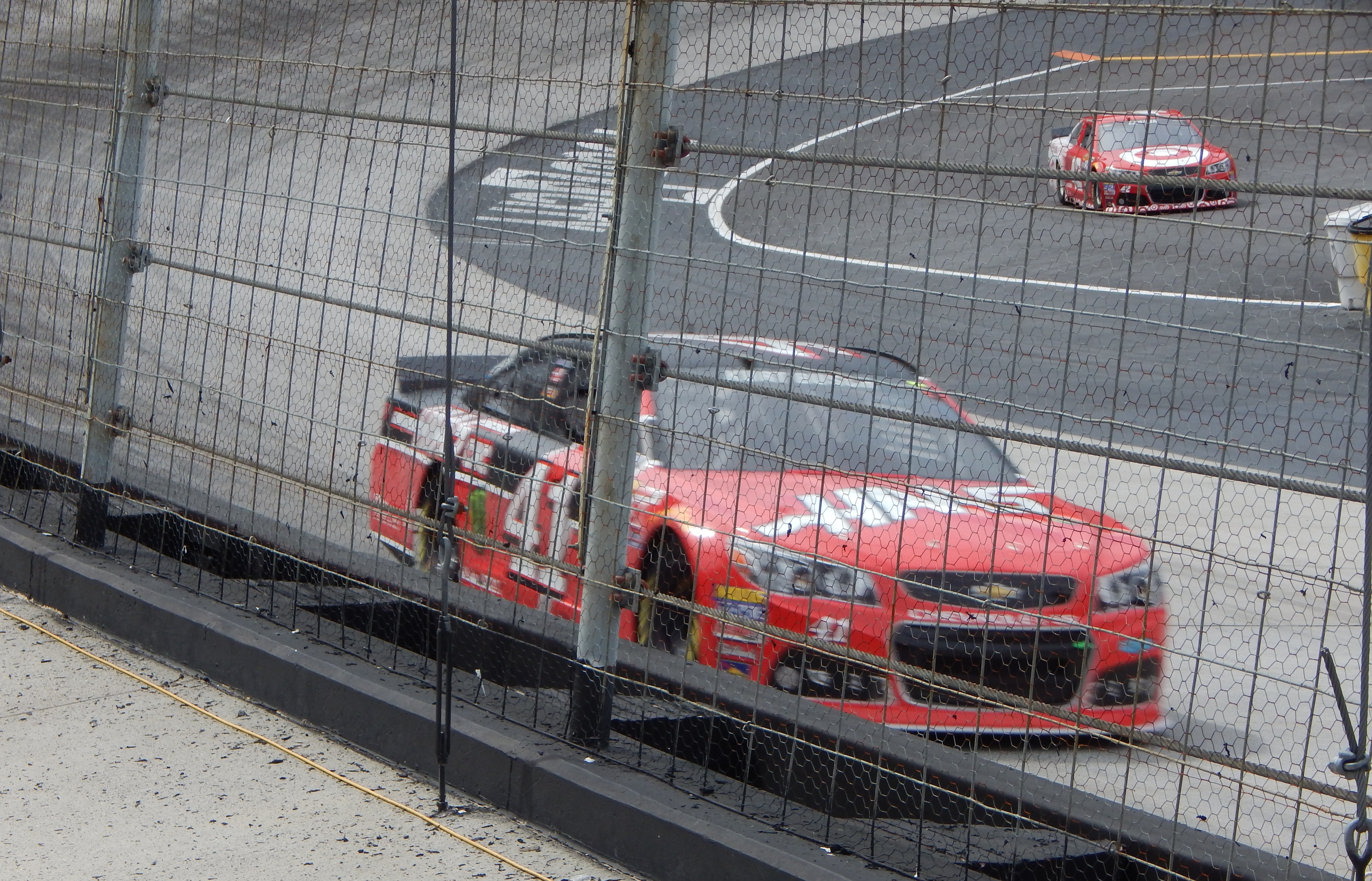
Kurt Busch was the fastest in the final practice session.

Kurt Busch was the fastest in the final practice session with a time of 15.043 and a speed of 127.554 mph (205.278 km/h).

Pos	No.	Driver	Team	Manufacturer	Time	Speed
1	41	Kurt Busch	Stewart–Haas Racing	Chevrolet	15.043	127.554
2	5	Kasey Kahne	Hendrick Motorsports	Chevrolet	15.164	126.537
3	18	David Ragan	Joe Gibbs Racing	Toyota	15.168	126.503
Official final practice results

== Race ==
=== First-half ===
==== Start ====
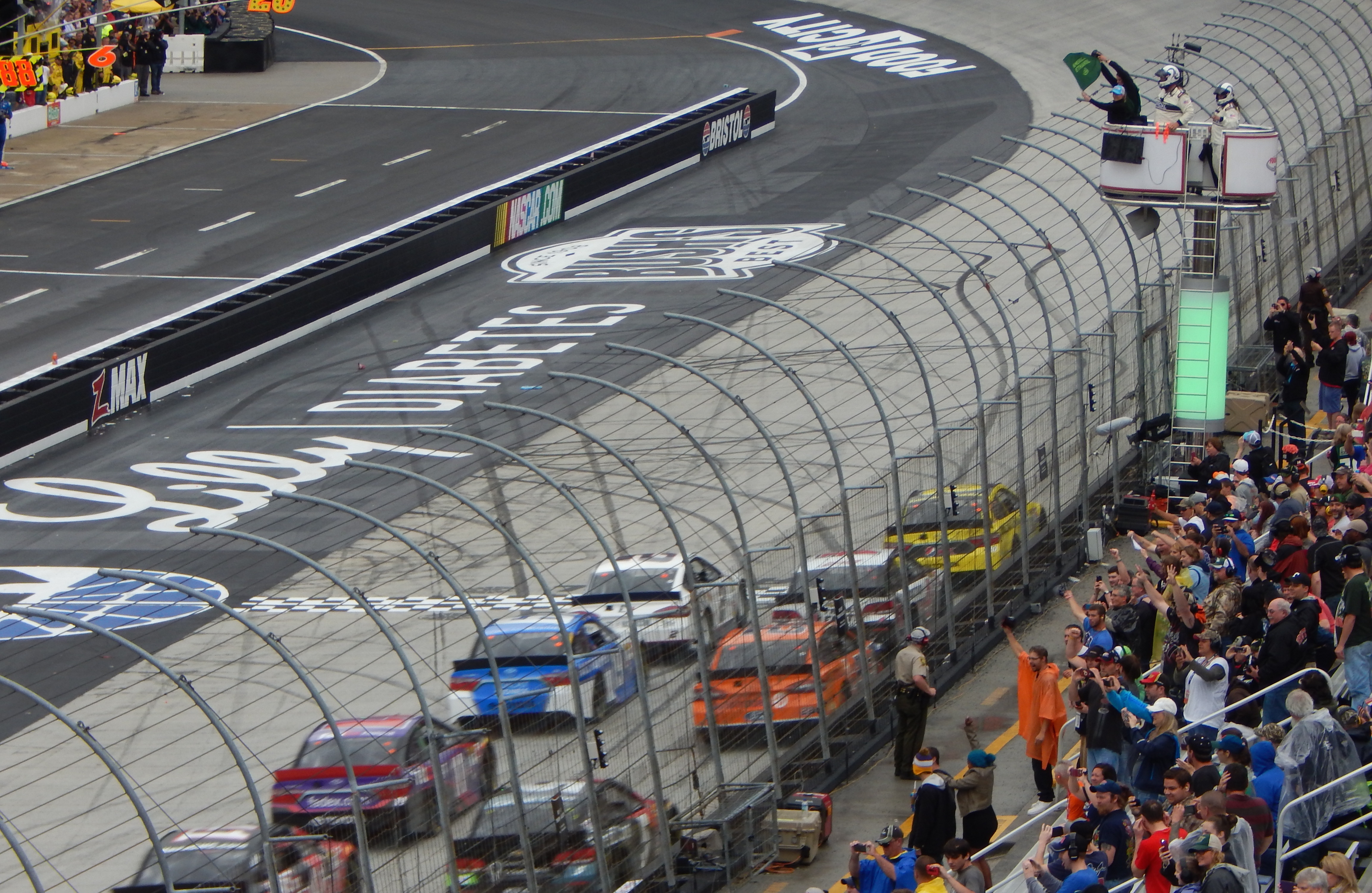
Matt Kenseth leads the field to the start of the Food City 500.

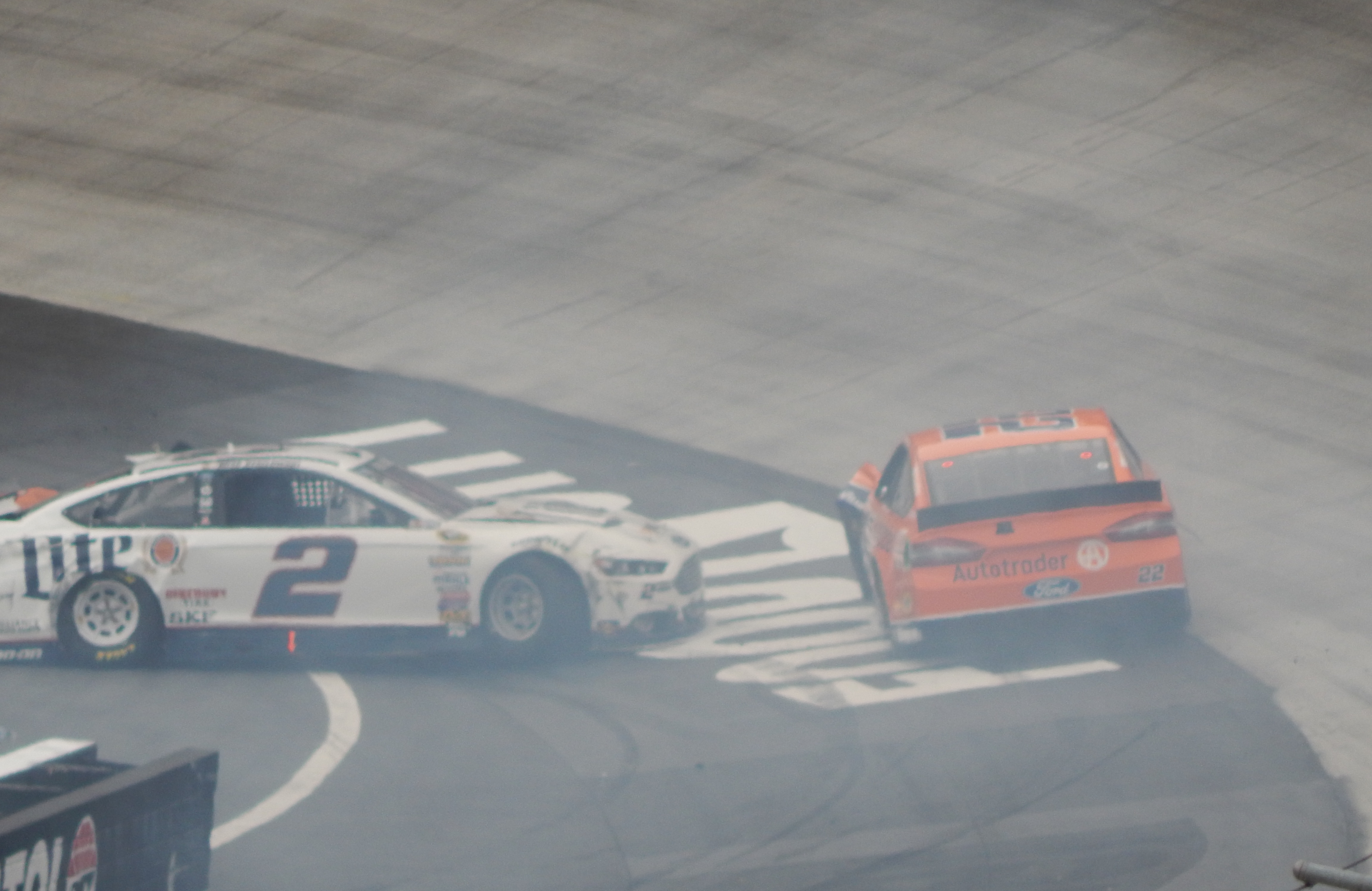
The Team Penske duo of Brad Keselowski and Joey Logano crash out on lap 20.

The race was scheduled to start at 1:13 p.m., but inclement weather delayed the start for over an hour. The track was eventually dried up enough to allow the race to commence at 2:31 p.m.. Matt Kenseth led the first five laps before losing the lead to Kevin Harvick on lap 6. Ricky Stenhouse Jr. made contact with the wall exiting turn 2. He saved the car and the race continued under green. The first caution of the race flew on lap 19 when Brad Keselowski and teammate Joey Logano hit the front stretch wall. Exiting turn 4, Keselowski's car got loose trying to pass Alex Kennedy, tapped the wall and turned down towards the apron. Logano was right behind him and was unable to avoid hitting his teammate. Keselowski put the crash down to the weather, saying that "it was a really light sprinkle, the track was barely dry" and "that the car just took off on me", while also stating that he was disappointed to make contact with teammate Logano after his car "moved crazy sideways". Logano stated that the crash "happened quick, obviously" and that "you get early in this race and kind of want to settle in and just starting to get the top worked in a little bit there and Brad just got loose underneath that lapped car". To add insult to injury for the Penske duo, the rain returned just moments later that red-flagged the race on lap 22.

===== Driver change =====
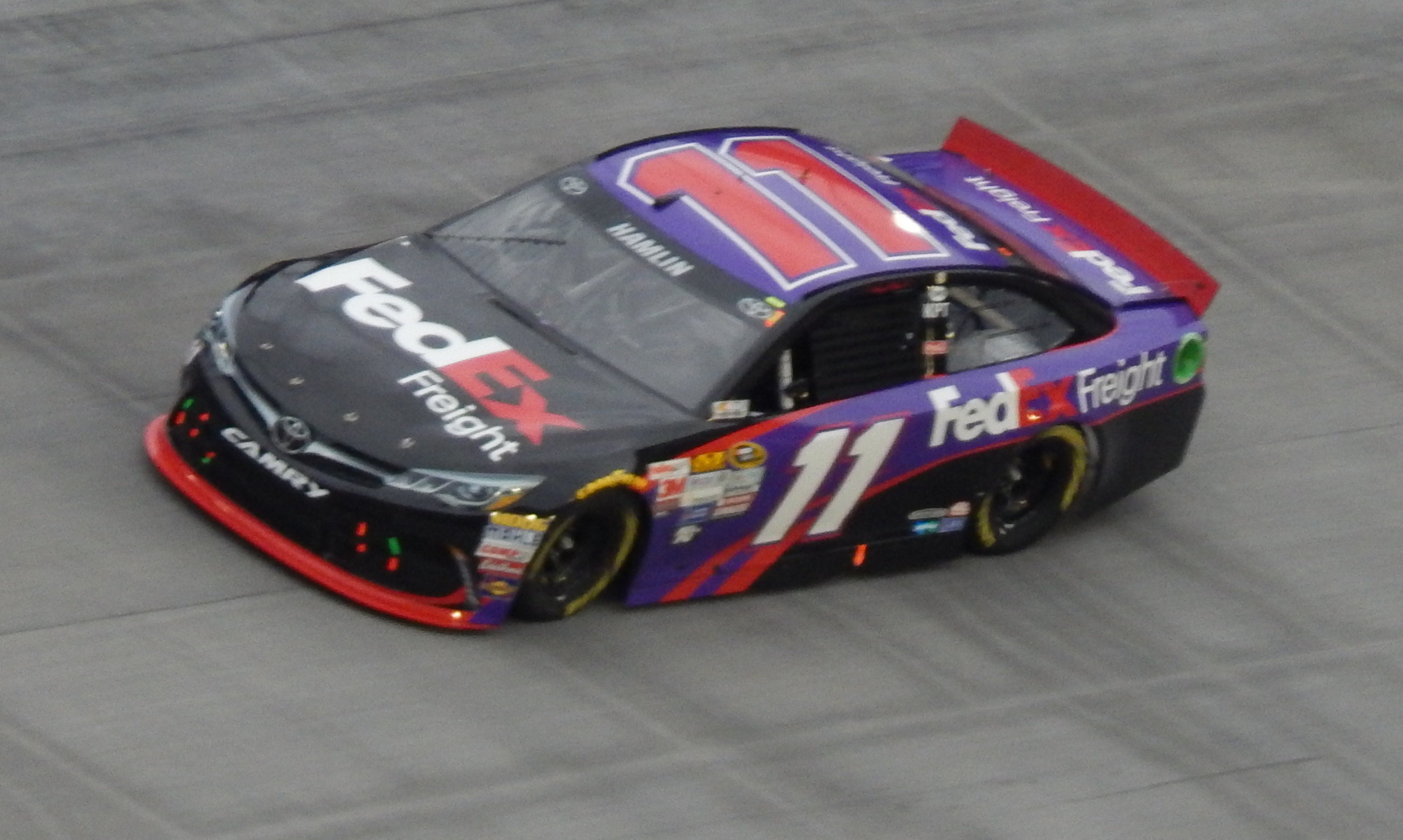
Erik Jones made his unofficial Sprint Cup Series debut in substitution for Denny Hamlin.

Prior to the restart, Erik Jones made his unofficial debut in the Sprint Cup Series when he replaced Denny Hamlin – who had suffered a muscle spasm – in the No. 11 car. During the race telecast, Hamlin stated that the injury had occurred during the race; he had "just pulled something in my neck to upper back about lap 12" and that he had "stretched it out and we've been working on it the last few hours". By stepping out the car, Hamlin also explained that "it's just better to have Erik come here and run some laps, get used to these Cup cars. We know where he is going to be in a few years". Jones, who had competed in the Xfinity Series race the previous day, had already flown back to Charlotte, North Carolina when he received a text message from an unnamed crew member of the No. 11 car to be prepared to fly back down to Bristol. "I got a text from one of the crew members and they let me know that I might need to be on standby," Jones said. "Right then I started packing a bag. I called my dad and said, 'Hey, I think I might be getting to run a Cup race tonight.' He was like, 'Okay, cool keep me updated.' Took off right from there and flew here and helicoptered in and got in and drove." He arrived by helicopter at the track just five minutes before the race restarted. Jones piloted the car to a 26th-place finish, which was credited to Hamlin as he had started the race.

==== Restart ====
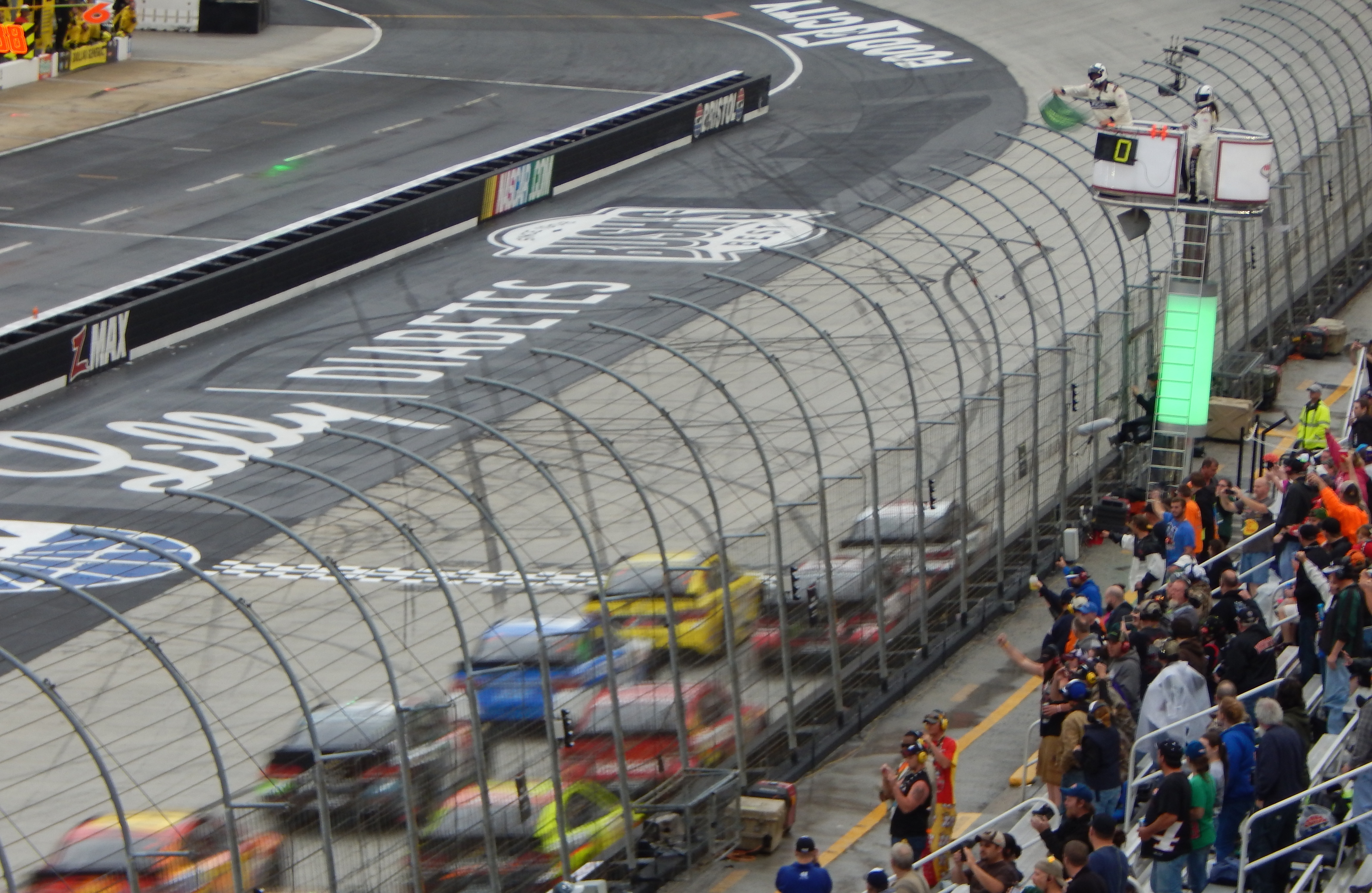
Kevin Harvick leads the field to the restart.

While the race was still under its first caution, the scoring pylon and digital leaderboards all changed the positions to 24 on the 24th lap in honor of Jeff Gordon. The race restarted shortly after 7:00 p.m. on lap 35 with Kevin Harvick in the lead. The race proceeded orderly until the second caution of the race flew on lap 61 – a scheduled competition caution because of the rain. Kurt Busch took the lead from his teammate Harvick, when Harvick pitted on the backstretch. Greg Biffle opted not to pit and assumed the lead, while Brett Moffitt and David Ragan had to start from the rear of the field, after both were caught speeding on pit road.

==== Green flag run ====
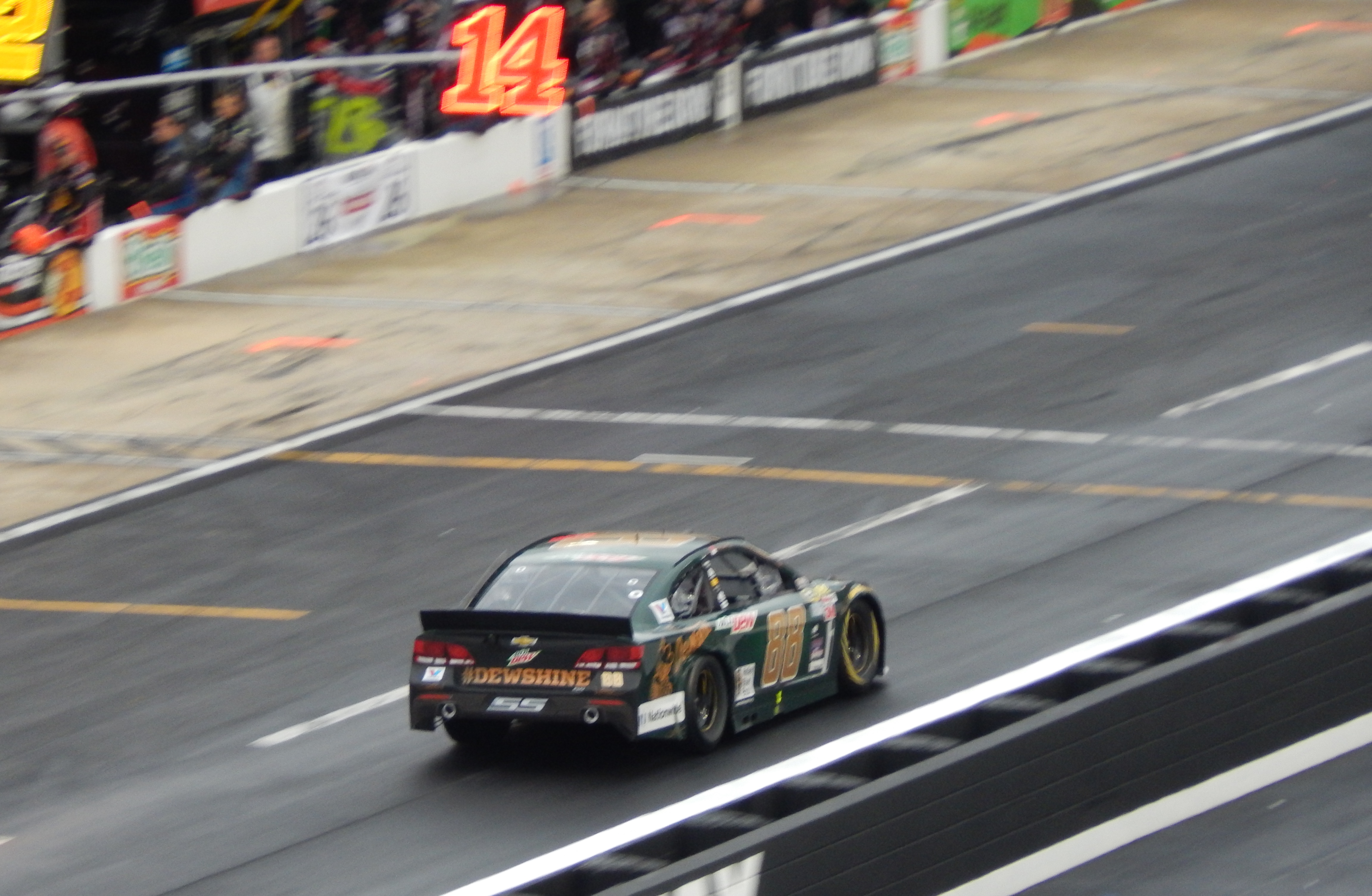
Dale Earnhardt Jr. made an unscheduled stop on lap 103.

The race restarted on lap 69. While Greg Biffle got a jump on the restart – on old tires – Kurt Busch on four new tires took the lead on lap 70 and would hold the lead for the next 55 laps. Kevin Harvick was tapped exiting turn 2 by Michael McDowell and made light contact with the wall, causing cosmetic damage. Dale Earnhardt Jr. made an unscheduled stop on lap 103 for a flat tire. Landon Cassill brushed the wall and began to slow down on the backstretch and almost took out several cars on lap 108. Kevin Harvick took the lead on lap 126 and held it for the next portion of the race before Busch took back the lead on lap 162. Harvick regained the lead on lap 167, before the race's third caution period commenced the following lap due to weepers. With the drivers pitting on either side of the track, the lead swapped hands momentarily; however, Harvick held the lead for the restart on lap 176.

Jeff Gordon made an unscheduled stop on lap 205 for a loose, deflating wheel; he lost two laps in the process. In a show of support for Steve Byrnes, the fans and crews all stood up on the 250th lap holding up signs reading "I Stand Up For Steve." The Fox crew went silent for the next three laps to show their support for their ill cohort. Jeff Gordon, on much fresher tires, managed to pull up to and pass leader Harvick to earn back one of his laps. This allowed Carl Edwards to pass Harvick for the lead on lap 257. Edwards put him back down two laps before the caution flew for the fourth time on lap 266 for rain. Edwards and Busch swapped the lead on pit road, but Edwards exited pit road with the lead. David Gilliland and Ryan Newman both started at the rear of the field for the restart; they were caught speeding on pit road. The rain intensified and the race was red flagged for the second time on lap 273.

=== Second-half ===
==== Halfway ====
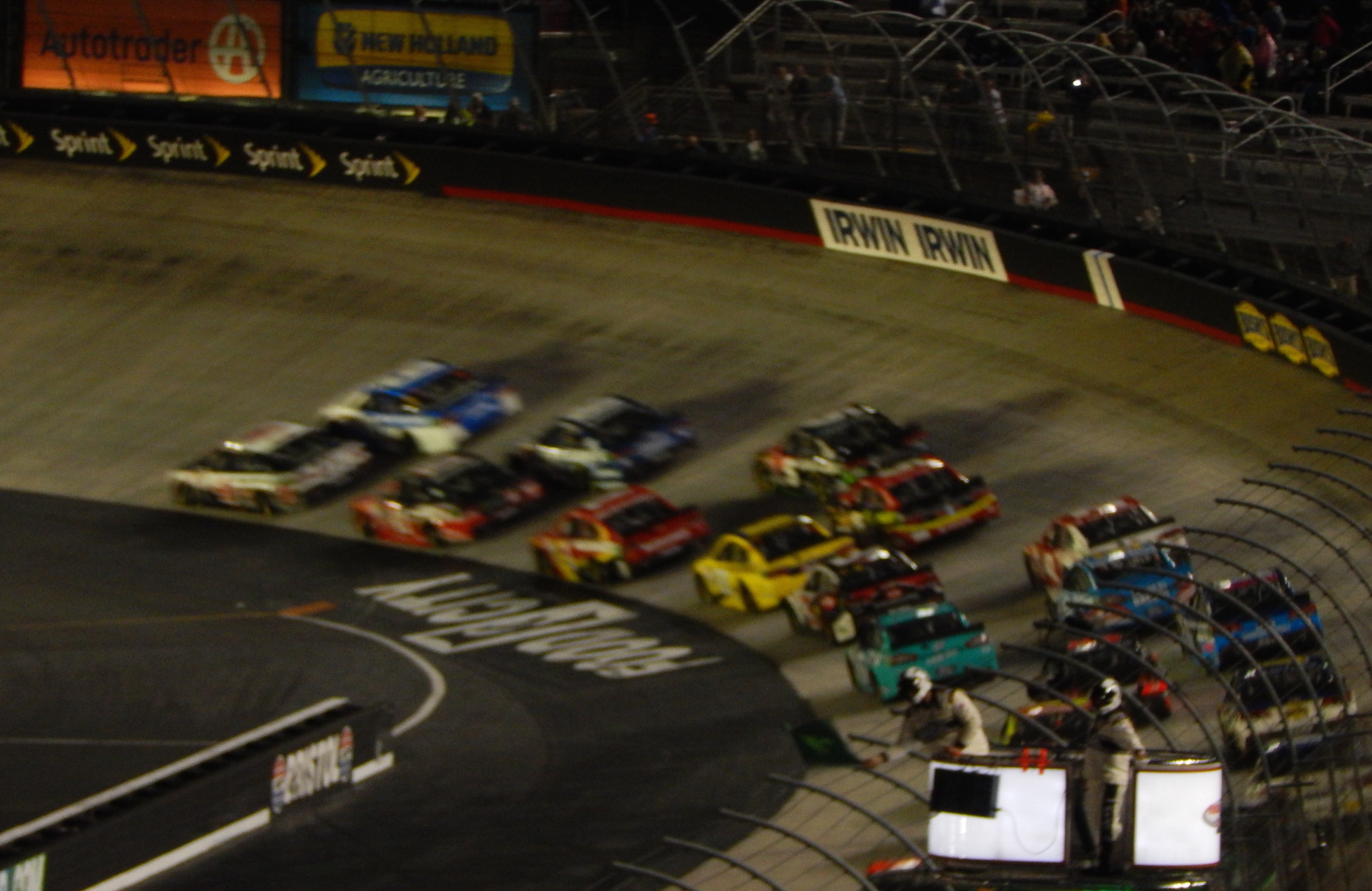
The race restarted on lap 278.

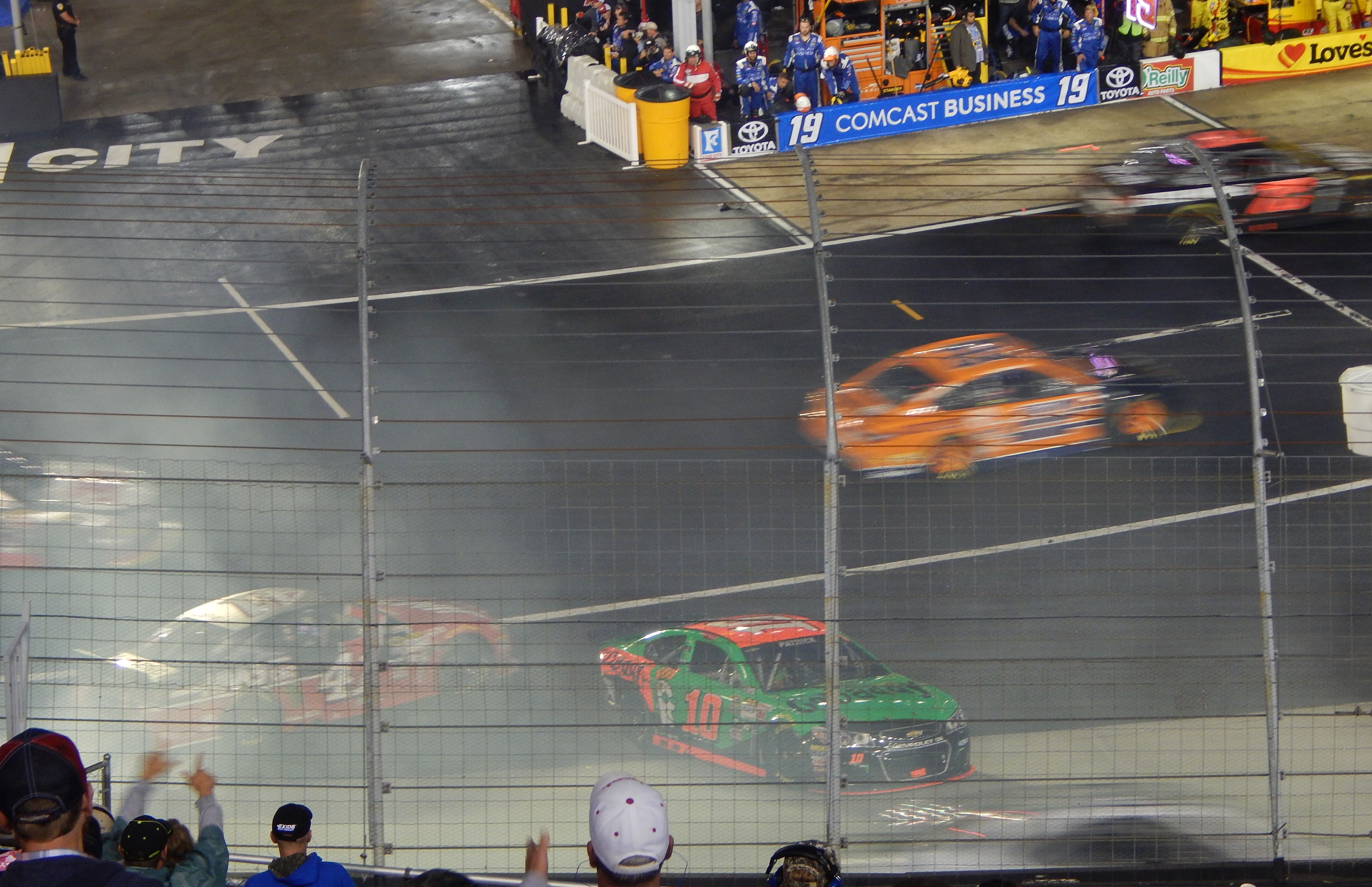
Trouble in turn 4.

After a 16-minute delay, the race restarted on lap 278; no sooner had the race restarted before an incident in turn 4 brought out the fifth caution. Going into turn 3, Kurt Busch pushed up into Jimmie Johnson on his outside; Johnson made moderate contact with the wall, while Busch spun out in front of the oncoming field. Other than a few pushed in fenders and Alex Bowman spinning out behind Busch, there was no major damage.

===== Trouble in turn 1 =====
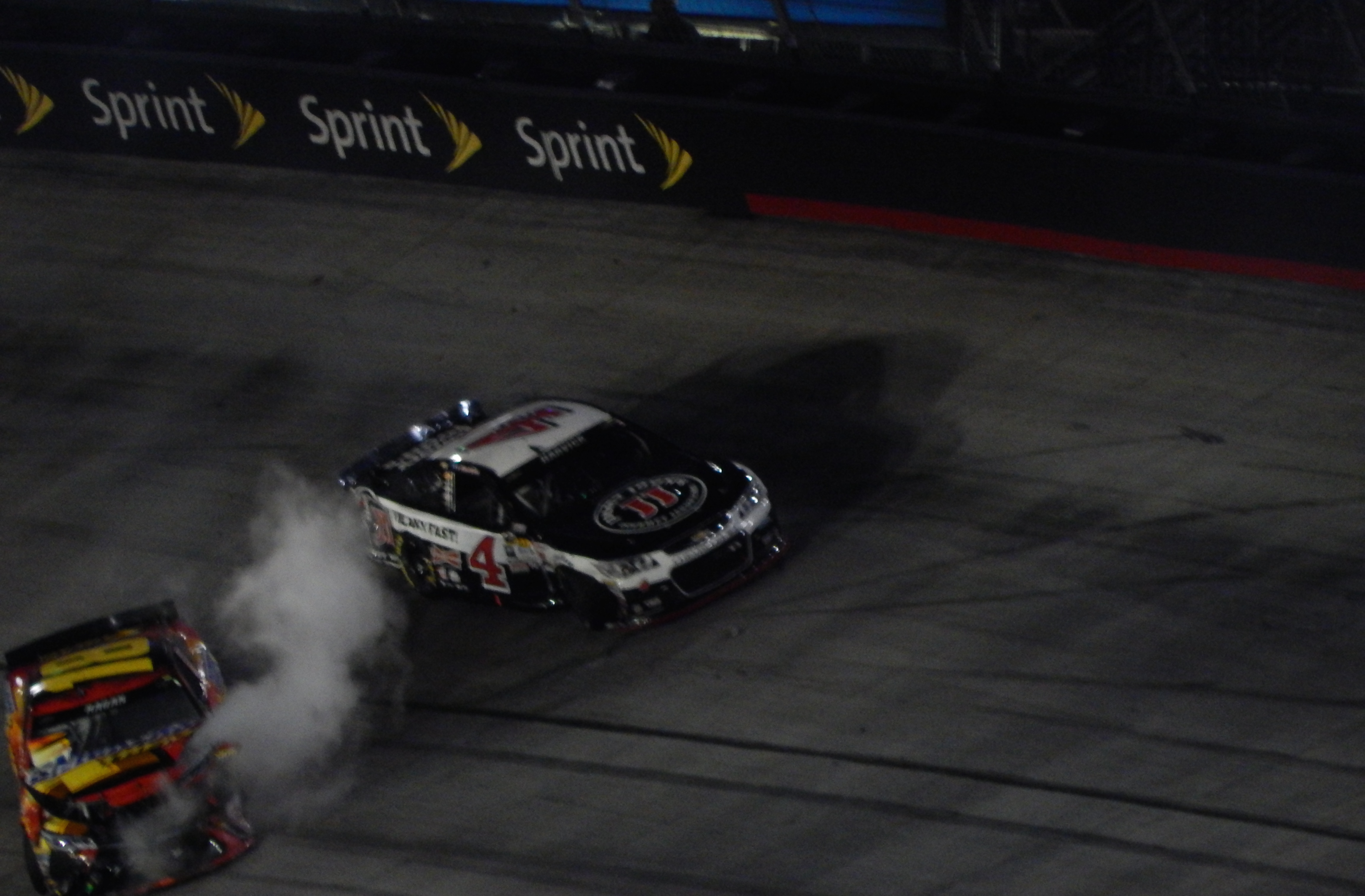
Kevin Harvick's streak of top ten finishes came to an end on lap 310.

The race restarted on lap 292. Martin Truex Jr. cut down his left-front tire after making contact with Mike Bliss exiting turn 2. The sixth caution of the race flew on lap 310 for a multi-car wreck in turn 1. Jeb Burton got turned into the wall by Johnson. David Ragan crashed into the back of Johnson and then T-boned the side of Burton's car, while Johnson slid down the track. Kevin Harvick, who was running third in the race at the time, could not stop in time, got sideways and crashed into Ragan. Ragan described the incident as "when you race back there with the squirrels, you find a nut sometimes" but that was "just Bristol" and "one of those things you have in short track racing". Kurt Busch was penalized for an uncontrolled tire and restarted from the tail-end of the field.

===== Restart =====
The race restarted on lap 325. A piece of metal that had fallen off Danica Patrick's car in turn 1 brought out the seventh caution of the race on lap 344. Edwards swapped the lead with teammate Matt Kenseth on pit road, but Kyle Larson opted not to pit and assumed the lead. The race restarted on lap 350. The eighth caution of the race flew on lap 367 for a heavy crash involving Cassill. Trying to get around him on the front stretch, Larson moved up and clipped Cassill's car. He clipped J. J. Yeley, who in turn, crashed into the turn 1 wall. He got out of the car unaided.

==== Fourth quarter ====
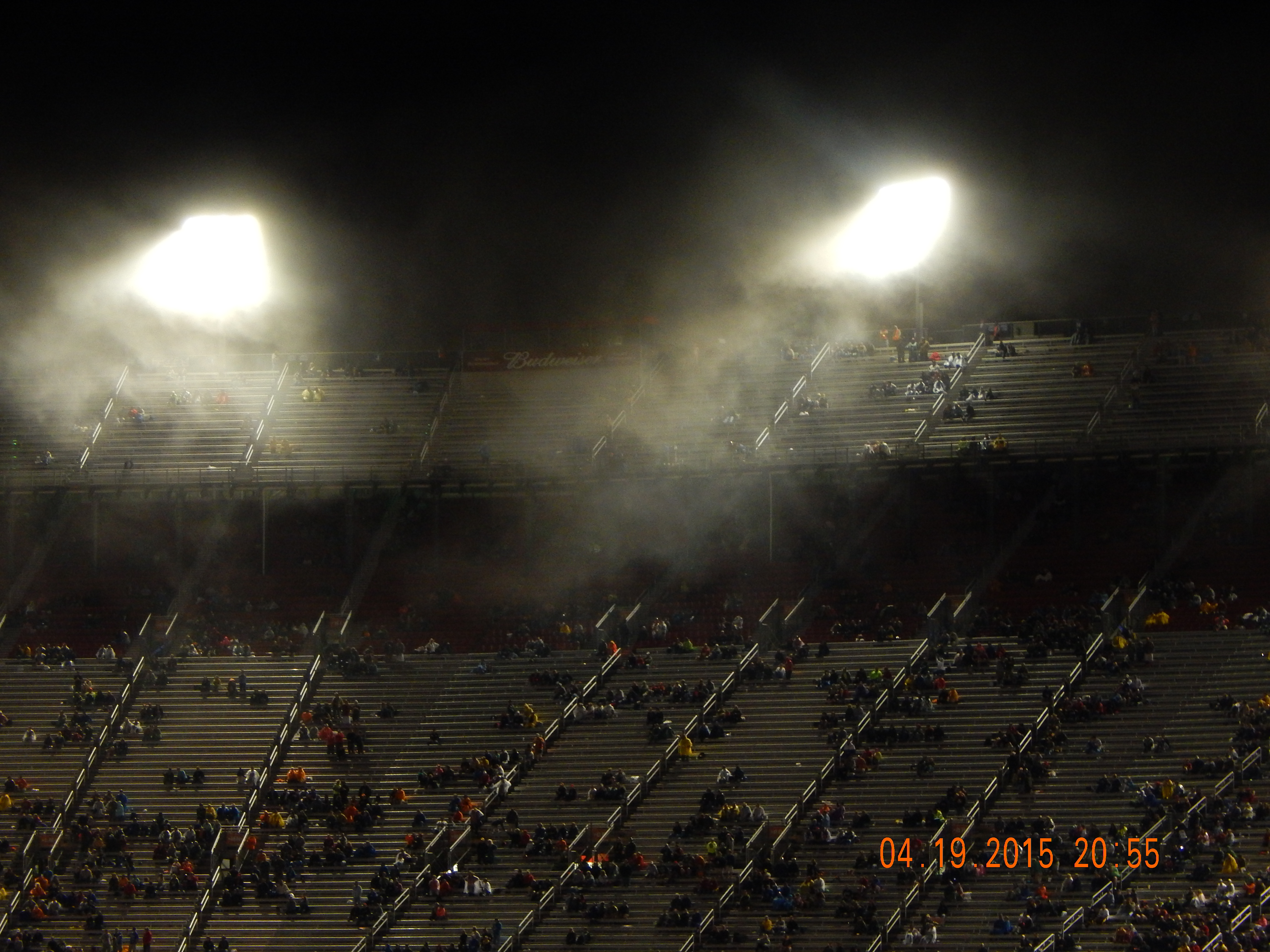
Fog descended on Thunder Valley in the closing laps of the race.

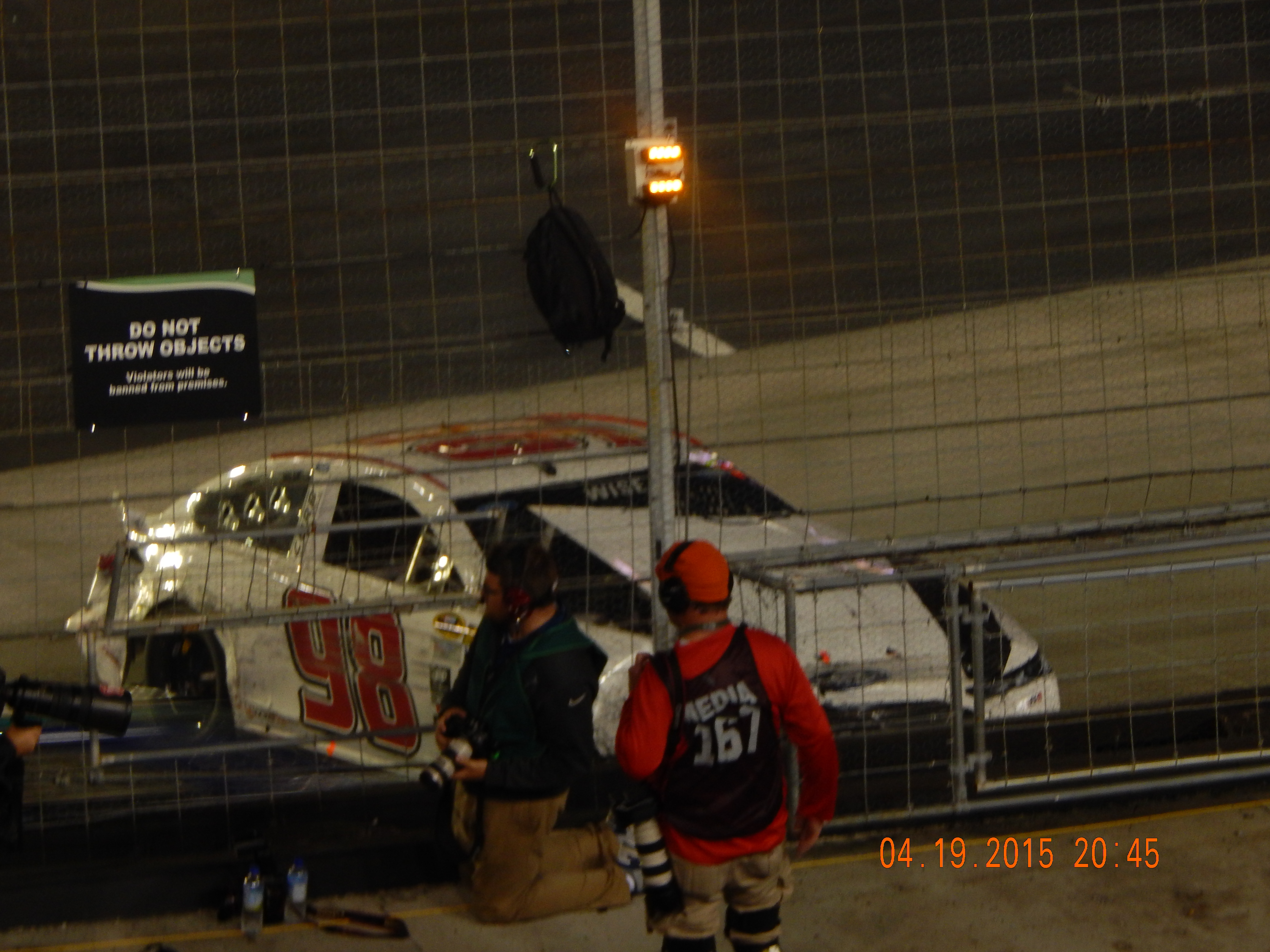
Josh Wise crashed out with 29 laps to go.

The race restarted on lap 381. Matt Kenseth caught up to Kyle Larson and the two battled for the lead for a good ten laps before Larson began to pull away with 81 laps to go. He hit pit road with 64 laps to go and Kenseth took back the lead. Kurt Busch went to the bottom of Kenseth, and used Martin Truex. Jr. as a pick to take the lead with 56 laps to go. After being down two laps at one point during the race, Jeff Gordon muscled his way into third with 50 laps to go. The ninth caution of the race flew with 29 laps to go for a multi-car wreck in turn 4. In a classic Bristol accordion effect, it started when Jamie McMurray blew a right-front tire running next to the wall in turn 3. Josh Wise, who was running right behind him, rear-ended him and was in turn, rear-ended by Clint Bowyer. Ricky Stenhouse Jr. was slowing down to avoid the wreck ahead when he was hit in the rear by Erik Jones, before Michael Annett rear-ended Jones. Danica Patrick, who was also trying to avoid the wreck, got hit in the rear and turned by Michael McDowell. Bowyer sprained his wrist trying to avoid hitting Wise again. Busch was the only driver to pit under the caution, and Kenseth assumed the lead.

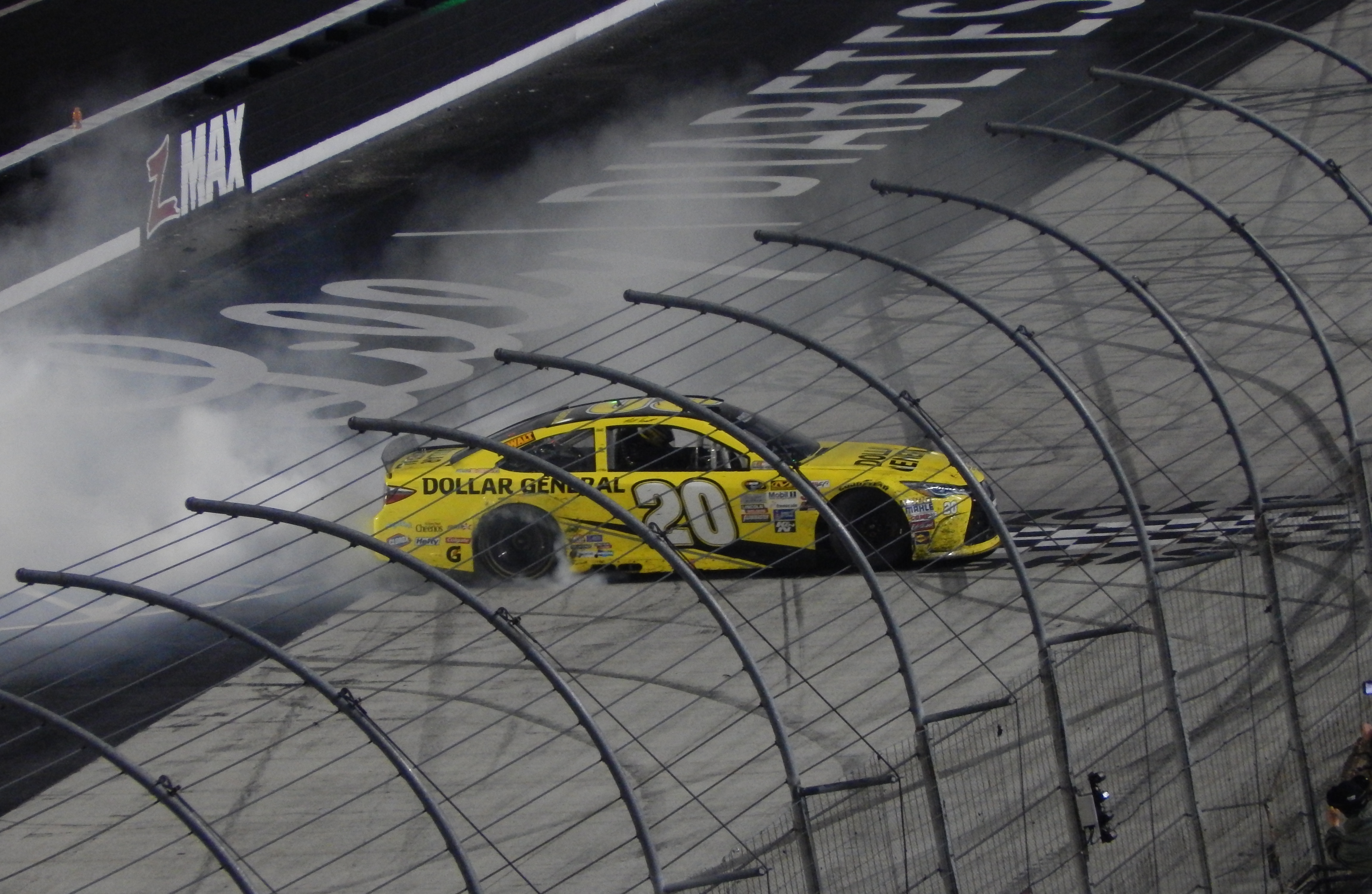
Matt Kenseth ended a 51 race winless streak.

The race restarted with 19 laps to go, but the 10th caution of the race flew the following lap for a multi-car wreck on the backstretch. Tony Stewart clipped Kasey Kahne who turned down into A. J. Allmendinger. Both drivers hit the inside wall before turning back onto the racing surface taking out Casey Mears and Truex Jr. in the process. The race restarted with eight laps to go, before the 11th caution of the race flew with six laps to go for another multi-car wreck on the backstretch. In another classic Bristol accordion effect, Edwards got loose exiting turn 2 and made contact with the wall. Kurt Busch had no time to react and crashed into him. Justin Allgaier clipped and turned with Paul Menard trying to avoid Edwards' car. Sam Hornish Jr. got turned by Matt DiBenedetto while trying to avoid the wreck. After several laps under yellow – taking the race beyond its scheduled 500-lap distance – the race was red flagged for the third time on lap 505 as rain returned to the track again. The top three cars were borderline on fuel with the fuel window being 130 laps and their last stop being over 20 laps more than the window. The cars were brought down pit road after the race was suspended. After an additional 20-minute delay, the field began rolling off pit road. After three laps, the race restarted and pole-sitter Matt Kenseth took the victory on a green–white–checker finish, his first victory in 51 races going back to 2013.

=== Post-race ===
==== Driver comments ====
In Victory Lane, Kenseth was pleased at ending his 18-month streak, stating that he was "glad we were able to finish this tonight and we had the car to stay ahead at the end", while also stating that "it was a crazy night for sure but it feels good to be back here in Victory Lane". In second place was Jimmie Johnson, who described the race as "a wild night", but praised his team for all their hard work and was "thrilled to get such a great finish here at really one of the tougher tracks for me as a driver".

=== Race results ===
Pos	No.	Driver	Team	Manufacturer	Laps	Points
1	20	Matt Kenseth	Joe Gibbs Racing	Toyota	511	47
2	48	Jimmie Johnson	Hendrick Motorsports	Chevrolet	511	42
3	24	Jeff Gordon	Hendrick Motorsports	Chevrolet	511	41
4	17	Ricky Stenhouse Jr.	Roush Fenway Racing	Ford	511	40
5	31	Ryan Newman	Richard Childress Racing	Chevrolet	511	39
6	14	Tony Stewart	Stewart–Haas Racing	Chevrolet	511	38
7	42	Kyle Larson	Chip Ganassi Racing	Chevrolet	511	38
8	51	Justin Allgaier	HScott Motorsports	Chevrolet	511	36
9	10	Danica Patrick	Stewart–Haas Racing	Chevrolet	511	35
10	3	Austin Dillon	Richard Childress Racing	Chevrolet	511	34
11	27	Paul Menard	Richard Childress Racing	Chevrolet	511	33
12	15	Clint Bowyer	Michael Waltrip Racing	Toyota	511	32
13	43	Aric Almirola	Richard Petty Motorsports	Ford	511	31
14	1	Jamie McMurray	Chip Ganassi Racing	Chevrolet	510	30
15	41	Kurt Busch	Stewart–Haas Racing	Chevrolet	510	30
16	88	Dale Earnhardt Jr.	Hendrick Motorsports	Chevrolet	509	28
17	55	Brett Moffitt (R)	Michael Waltrip Racing	Toyota	509	27
18	38	David Gilliland	Front Row Motorsports	Ford	508	26
19	9	Sam Hornish Jr.	Richard Petty Motorsports	Ford	508	25
20	7	Alex Bowman	Tommy Baldwin Racing	Chevrolet	508	24
21	83	Matt DiBenedetto (R)	BK Racing	Toyota	508	23
22	95	Michael McDowell	Leavine Family Racing	Ford	507	22
23	46	Michael Annett	HScott Motorsports	Chevrolet	507	21
24	19	Carl Edwards	Joe Gibbs Racing	Toyota	507	21
25	34	Chris Buescher (i)	Front Row Motorsports	Ford	505	0
26	11	Denny Hamlin (Note: Denny Hamlin was replaced early in the race by Erik Jones, due to a muscle spasm. Hamlin was credited with the finish for starting the race.)	Joe Gibbs Racing	Toyota	505	18
27	35	Cole Whitt	Front Row Motorsports	Ford	504	17
28	6	Trevor Bayne	Roush Fenway Racing	Ford	504	16
29	78	Martin Truex Jr.	Furniture Row Racing	Chevrolet	504	15
30	16	Greg Biffle	Roush Fenway Racing	Ford	504	15
31	32	Mike Bliss (i)	Go FAS Racing	Ford	502	0
32	23	J. J. Yeley (i)	BK Racing	Toyota	496	0
33	33	Alex Kennedy (R)	Hillman-Circle Sport LLC	Chevrolet	490	11
34	47	A. J. Allmendinger	JTG Daugherty Racing	Chevrolet	489	10
35	2	Brad Keselowski	Team Penske	Ford	489	9
36	13	Casey Mears	Germain Racing	Chevrolet	487	8
37	5	Kasey Kahne	Hendrick Motorsports	Chevrolet	482	7
38	4	Kevin Harvick	Stewart–Haas Racing	Chevrolet	468	8
39	98	Josh Wise	Phil Parsons Racing	Ford	466	5
40	22	Joey Logano	Team Penske	Ford	452	4
41	18	David Ragan	Joe Gibbs Racing	Toyota	435	3
42	26	Jeb Burton (R)	BK Racing	Toyota	416	2
43	40	Landon Cassill (i)	Hillman-Circle Sport LLC	Chevrolet	288	0
Official Food City 500 results

=== Race statistics ===
- 21 lead changes among 6 different drivers
- 11 cautions for 117 laps; 3 red flags for 4 hours and 36 minutes
- Time of race: 3 hours, 37 minutes, 54 seconds
- Average speed: 74.997 mph (120.696 km/h)
- Matt Kenseth took home $217,961 in winnings

Lap leaders
Laps	Leader
1–5	Matt Kenseth
6–62	Kevin Harvick
63	Kurt Busch
64–69	Greg Biffle
70–125	Kurt Busch
126–160	Kevin Harvick
161–165	Kurt Busch
166–169	Kevin Harvick
170	Kurt Busch
171–256	Kevin Harvick
257–266	Carl Edwards
267	Kurt Busch
268–276	Carl Edwards
277	Kevin Harvick
278–290	Carl Edwards
291	Kevin Harvick
292–345	Carl Edwards
346	Matt Kenseth
347–436	Kyle Larson
437–443	Matt Kenseth
444–477	Kurt Busch
478–511	Matt Kenseth

Total laps led
Leader	Laps
Kevin Harvick	184
Kurt Busch	98
Kyle Larson	90
Carl Edwards	86
Matt Kenseth	47
Greg Biffle	6

==== Race awards ====
- Coors Light Pole Award: Matt Kenseth (14.917, 128.632 mph (207.013 km/h))
- 3M Lap Leader: Kevin Harvick (184 laps)
- American Ethanol Green Flag Restart Award: Matt Kenseth (15.753, 121.805 mph (196.026 km/h))
- Duralast Brakes "Bake In The Race" Award: Kevin Harvick
- Freescale "Wide Open": Ricky Stenhouse Jr.
- Ingersoll Rand Power Move: Kyle Larson, 11 positions
- MAHLE Clevite Engine Builder of the Race: Toyota Racing Development, #20
- Mobil 1 Driver of the Race: Matt Kenseth (129.8 driver rating)
- Moog Steering and Suspension Problem Solver of The Race: Ricky Stenhouse Jr. (crew chief Nick Sandler (0.238 seconds))
- NASCAR Sprint Cup Leader Bonus: No winner: rolls over to $50,000 at next event
- Sherwin-Williams Fastest Lap: Matt Kenseth (Lap 385, 15.028, 127.685 mph (205.489 km/h))
- Sunoco Rookie of The Race: Brett Moffitt

== Media ==
=== Television ===
Fox Sports covered their 15th race at Bristol Motor Speedway. Mike Joy, Larry McReynolds and Darrell Waltrip, the all-time wins leader at Bristol Motor Speedway with twelve victories, had the call in the booth for the race. Jamie Little, Chris Neville, Vince Welch and Matt Yocum handled the pit road duties.

Fox
Booth announcers	Pit reporters
Lap-by-lap: Mike Joy; Color-commentator: Larry McReynolds; Color commentator: Darrell Waltrip	Jamie Little; Chris Neville; Vince Welch; Matt Yocum

=== Radio ===
PRN had the radio call for the race, which was simulcasted on Sirius XM NASCAR Radio. Doug Rice, Mark Garrow and Wendy Venturini called the race in the booth when the field was racing down the front stretch. Rob Albright called the race from atop the suites in turn 3 when the field was racing down the backstretch. Brad Gillie, Brett McMillan, Jim Noble and Steve Richards worked pit road for PRN.

PRN
Booth announcers	Turn announcers	Pit reporters
Lead announcer: Doug Rice; Announcer: Mark Garrow; Announcer: Wendy Venturini	Backstretch: Rob Albright	Brad Gillie; Brett McMillan; Jim Noble; Steve Richards

== Standings after the race ==
Drivers' championship standings

	Pos	Driver	Points
	1	Kevin Harvick	314
	2	Joey Logano	284 (−30)
	3	Martin Truex Jr.	281 (−33)
2	4	Jimmie Johnson	258 (−56)
1	5	Brad Keselowski	255 (−59)
1	6	Dale Earnhardt Jr.	241 (−73)
2	7	Kasey Kahne	237 (−77)
4	8	Matt Kenseth	236 (−78)
4	9	Jeff Gordon	227 (−87)
1	10	Aric Almirola	226 (−88)
3	11	Denny Hamlin	223 (−91)
1	12	Jamie McMurray	223 (−91)
4	13	Danica Patrick	211 (−103)
2	14	Paul Menard	210 (−104)
1	15	Carl Edwards	203 (−111)
4	16	Ryan Newman	201 (−113)

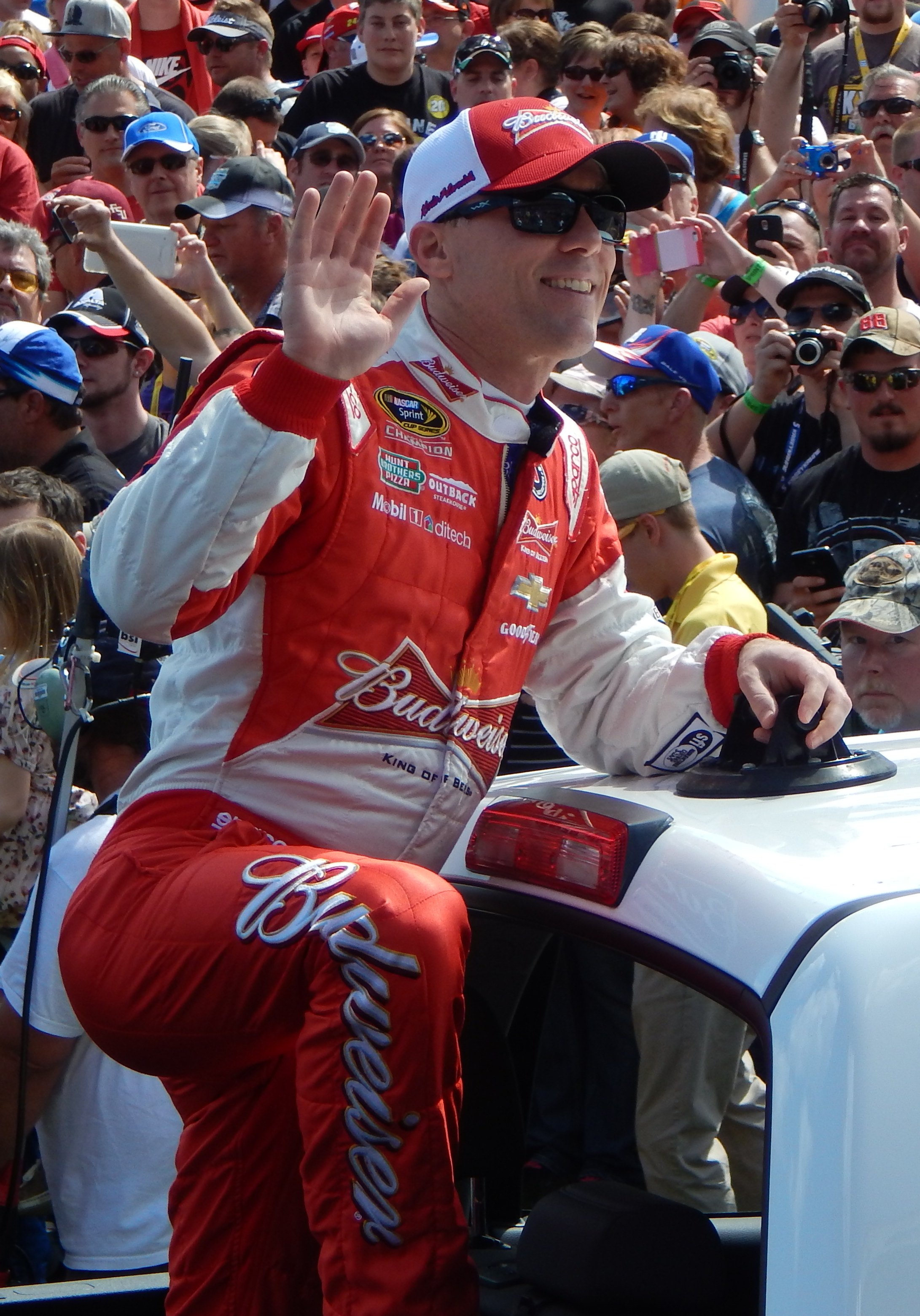
Kevin Harvick left Bristol with a 30-point lead over Joey Logano.

Manufacturers' championship standings

Pos	Manufacturer	Points
1	Chevrolet	357
2	Ford	336 (−21)
3	Toyota	311 (−46)

- Note: Only the first sixteen positions are included for the driver standings.

== Notes ==
Previous race: 2015 Duck Commander 500	Sprint Cup Series; 2015 season	Next race: 2015 Toyota Owners 400
