= Bill Moog =

American inventor (1915–1997)

William Moog (August 15, 1915 – August 22, 1997) is known for inventing the electrohydraulic servo valve in 1951. He founded Moog Inc., which makes actuators for aircraft.

He was born in New Jersey. His cousin was Robert Moog, one of the leading pioneers of the modern synthesizer.

Moog was married and had three daughters.
