= Workhorse SureFly =

Vertical take-off and landing aircraft

SureFly
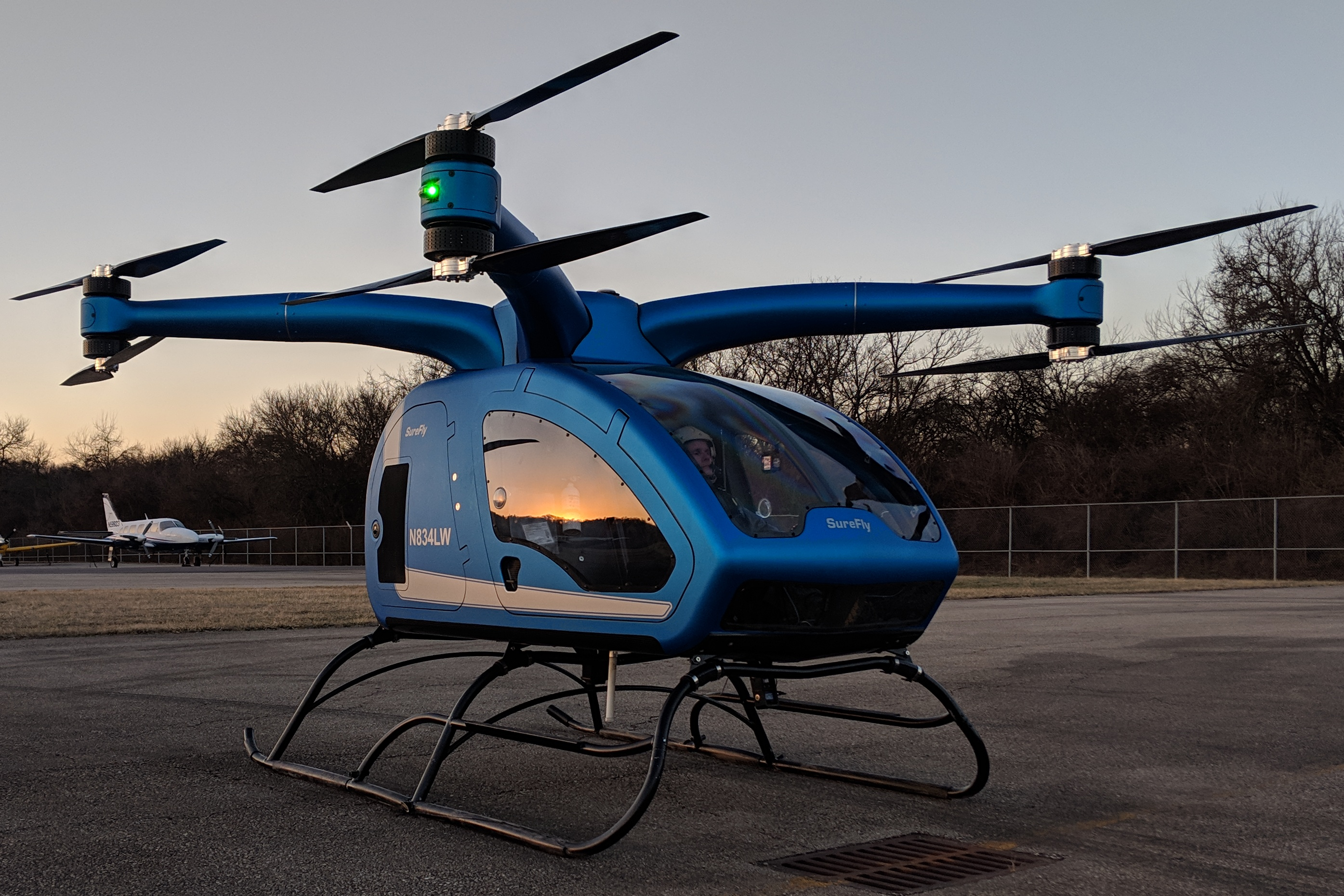
- The prototype during testing in 2019

General information
- Type: Hybrid electric helicopter
- National origin: United States
- Manufacturer: Moog Inc.
- Designer: Workhorse Group
- Status: Under development

History
- First flight: Spring 2018

The SureFly is a two-seat hybrid eVTOL aircraft designed by American truck-manufacturer Workhorse Group, before the program was bought by Moog Inc. for $5 million in December 2019.

== Design ==
The 70 mph (110 km/h) hybrid electric has a 200-hp gasoline generator giving up to 70 mi (110 km) range over 1 hour. It has four propeller arms, each with two electric contra-rotating propellers powered by a gas turbine or piston engine generator along with a battery pack. Targeting a price of $200,000, it can lift a 400 lb (180 kg) payload and includes a ballistic parachute.

The SureFly planned to operate as a conventional helicopter, like the similarly priced two-seat Robinson R22, but would be easier to fly and safer with its integral parachute. SureFly had taken refundable $1,000 deposits but did not specify a delivery date, and aimed to produce 1,000 per year.

The hybrid design is simpler than a pure gasoline drivetrain by eliminating the gearboxes and rotor linkages of a traditional helicopter, while security is higher through two redundant motors. Each propeller blade is driven directly by an independent electric motor and flight control is achieved by varying the RPM of each blade to achieve thrust vectoring and prevailing torque changes across the vehicle, similar to smaller multirotor unmanned aerial vehicles. It was later upgraded with a 200-kW generator, a 550 lb (250 kg) payload capability and up to 150 mi (240 km) range over 2 hours.

== Development ==
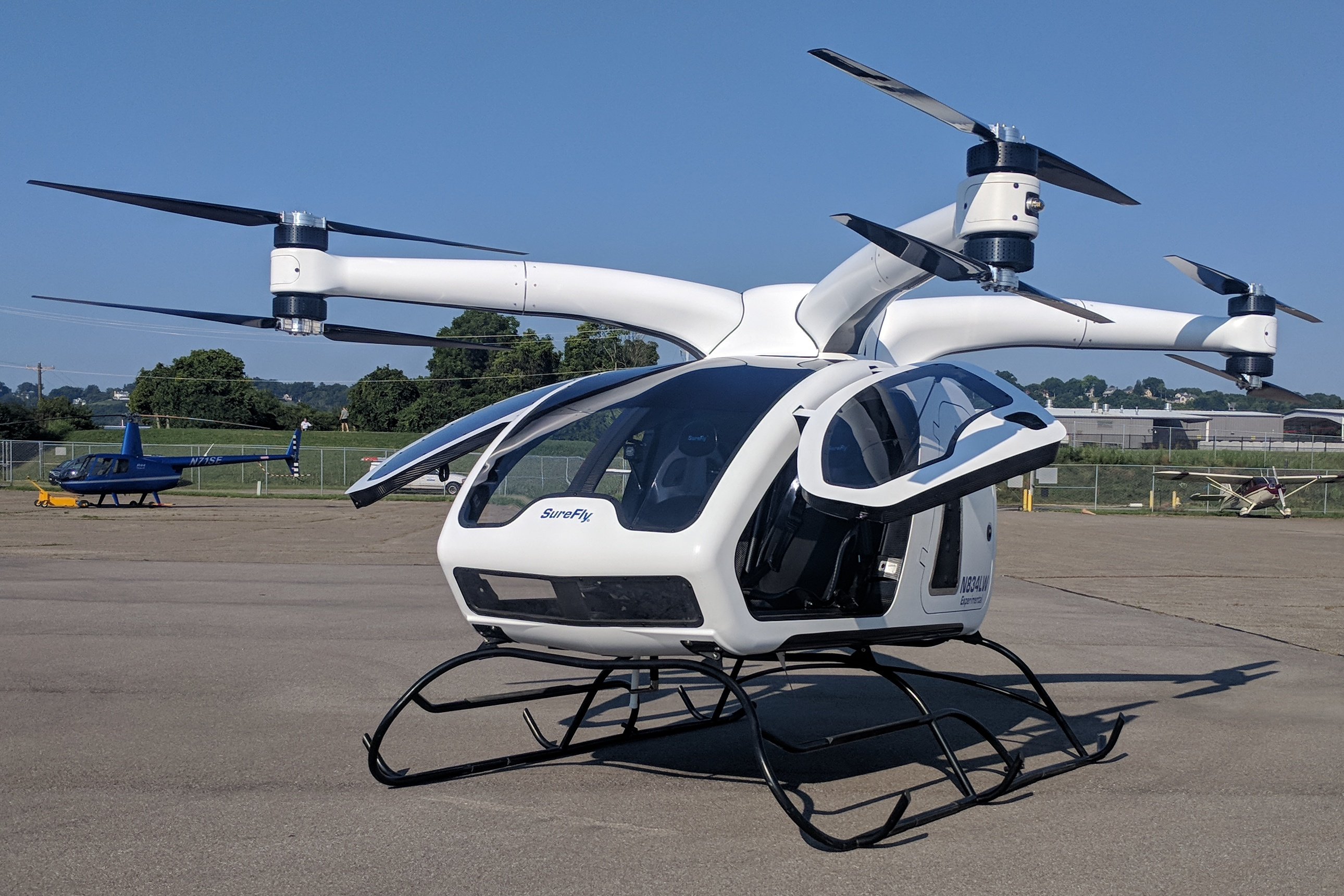
Prototype on ground with doors open in Summer 2018

After hundreds of tethered flights testing noise, battery and flight controls, it made a free first flight in spring 2018, reaching four feet during 10 seconds. Flight tests were planned to expand the flight envelope while FAA type certification advanced. Workhorse had intended to spin off SureFly into a separate company, valuing it $33 million.

FAA type certification was applied for in fall 2018. In October 2018, Workhorse put SureFly for sale and its latest backer, Marathon Asset Management, requires a $4 million liquidity for May 31, 2019.

In December 2019, flight controls specialist Moog Inc. bought the SureFly program for $5 million, interested by the electric power systems more than the aircraft, and will use it as an autonomous demonstrator.

== Specifications ==
Data from Workhorse.

General characteristics

- Crew: 1
- Capacity: 1 occupants or cargo
- Empty weight: 1,850 lb (839 kg)
- Max takeoff weight: 2,400 lb (1,089 kg)
- Fuel capacity: 4 x 3kWh Lithium Battery Packs for 5 min emergencies
- Powerplant: 1 × dual generators Fuel Piston Engine, 200 hp (150 kW) 8 × electric fixed pitch propeller

Performance

- Maximum speed: 86 mph (139 km/h, 75 kn)
- Range: 70 mi (110 km, 61 nmi)
- Endurance: 2.5 h
- Service ceiling: 5,000 ft (1,500 m)

== See also ==
- Passenger drone
- Personal air vehicle

Aircraft of comparable role, configuration, and era

- Airbus A³ Vahana
- Airbus CityAirbus
- Ehang UAV
