= Moog Inc. =

American aerospace company

- Type: Public
- Traded as: NYSE: MOG.A (Class A); NYSE: MOG.B (Class B); S&P 400 component (MOG.A)
- Industry: Aerospace, defense, industrial automation, and motion control
- Founded: 1951; 75 years ago
- Headquarters: Elma, New York, U.S.
- Key people: Pat Roche (chairman and CEO); Jennifer Walter (CFO)
- Products: Hydraulic and electronic control systems
- Revenue: ▲US$4.52 billion (2026)
- Net income: ▲US$420 million (2026)
- Total assets: ▲US$4.93 billion (2026)
- Total equity: ▲US$2.28 billion (2026)
- Number of employees: c. 14,000 (2026)
- Website: moog.com
- Footnotes; Financials as of October 3, 2026.

Moog Inc. (/moʊɡ/ MOHG) is an American-based designer and manufacturer of electric, electro-hydraulic and hydraulic motion, controls and systems for applications in aerospace, defense, industrial and medical devices. The company operates under four segments: aircraft controls, space and defense controls, industrial controls, and components. Moog is headquartered in Elma, New York, and has sales, engineering, and manufacturing facilities in twenty-six countries.

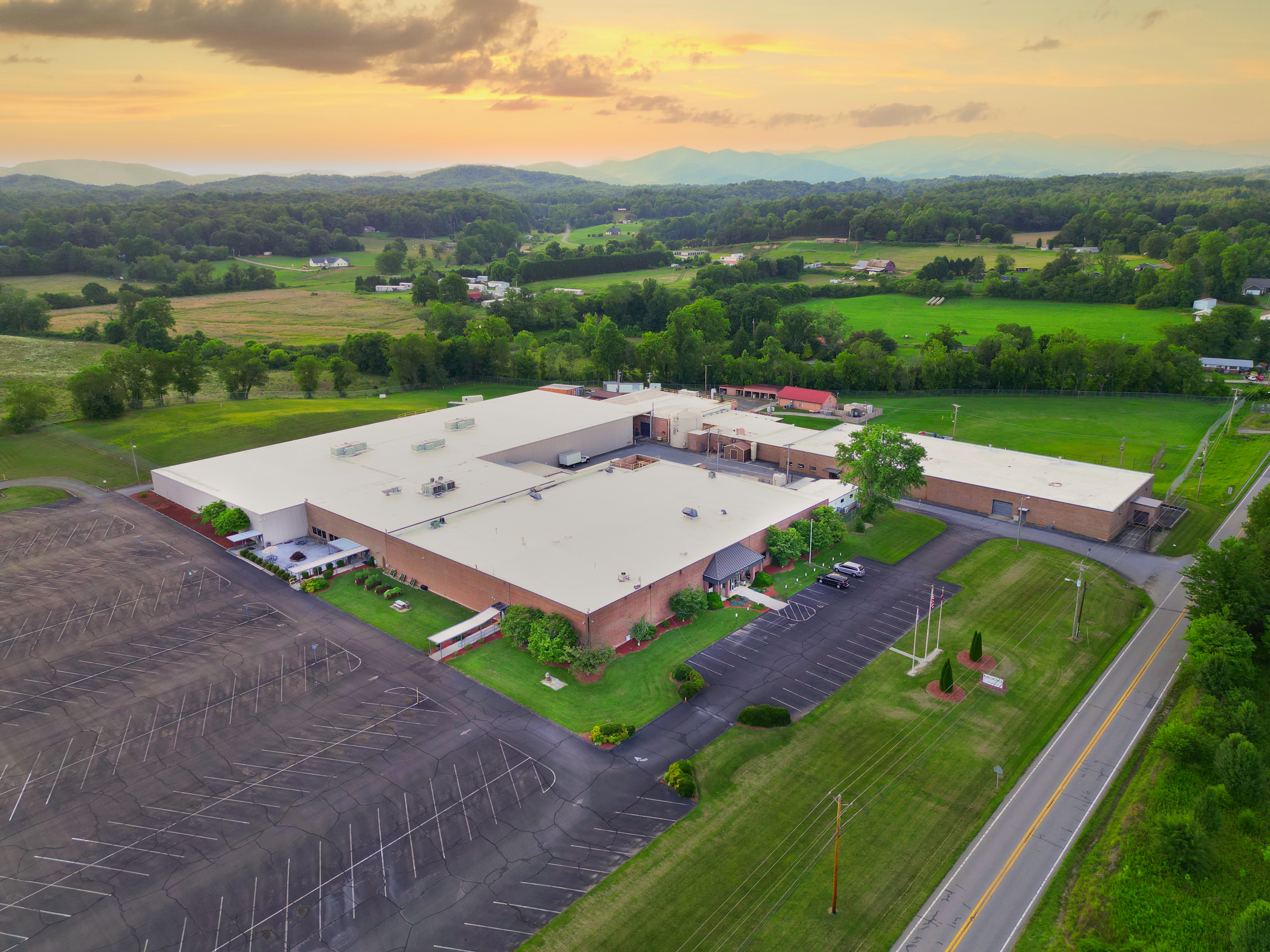
Aerial of a Moog Inc. manufacturing plant in North Carolina

== History ==
=== 1950s: Founding ===
In April 1950 Bill Moog applied for a patent for the electrohydraulic servo valve (later called a "Moog Valve". This device to control hydraulic pressure for fine control of actuators, initially to control the movement of guided missiles. The US patent 2625136 was issued in January 1953. Bill was a design engineer at Cornell Aeronautical Laboratories in Buffalo, New York. He was a cousin to Robert Moog, inventor of the Moog synthesizer.

Meanwhile, in July 1951, Bill Moog, his brother Art Moog, and fellow engineer at Cornell Lou Geyer pooled $3,000 to start the company Moog Valve Company Inc. Early press reports seem to indicate that the company was also referred to as Moog Valve Company Inc. According to company records, they had limited resources, a primitive work facility in the corner of a dirt-floored airplane hangar in East Aurora, NY, and only a couple of potential customers.

According to the Commercial and Financial Chronicle, Moog's first public offering of shares took place in 1959, with the company having changed its name to Moog Servocontrols Inc filing an offering of 130,000 shares on 30 March 1959, with Kidder Peabody as the placing broker-dealer. Although the offering was initially postponed, the company's shares were subsequently traded over the counter.

=== 1960s to 1980s: Growth and international expansion ===
In September 1965, shareholders approved a six-for-five stock split and increased the company's authorised shares from 700,000 to one million, and changed its name from Moog Servocontrols Inc to Moog Inc. The company said that the changes were required for a planned listing on the American Stock Exchange.

By the end of 1965, Moog Inc had completed its listing on the American Stock Exchange and was now trading as Moog Inc.

During the 1970s and 1980s, Moog continued to grow, diversifying into providing flight control systems and actuators for commercial aircraft programs and industrial applications, and expanded internationally, opening subsidiaries and manufacturing and engineering facilities in the United Kingdom, Germany and Japan.

=== 1990s: Declining defense spending and acquisitions ===
The early 1990s presented Moog with its greatest strategic challenge since its founding. The end of the Cold War led to significant reductions in US defence procurement. From 1990-1994, Moog's overall revenues grew by only 1.2%. Without acquisitions in that time period, they would fallen by 6.2%.

In 1994, Moog acquired the hydraulic and mechanical actuation product lines of AlliedSignal Inc, based in Torrance, California. This strengthened their positioned in actuation products in both the military and commercial aircraft segments.

In December 1995, Moog acquired the servovalve product line of Ultra Hydraulics Limited, a United Kingdom based manufacturer of hydraulic components, strengthening its position in the international market. In October 1996, Moog acquired the industrial hydraulic servocontrols business of International Motion Control Inc.

By this time, Moog's business had significantly diversified, with products ranging from entertainment motion simulators, flight controls for Commercial Aircraft, controls for communications satellites and launch vehicles as well as military aircraft programs such as the F/A-18 Super Hornet and V-22 Osprey. Government sales had dropped from 57% of total revenues to 39% of total revenues during the period 1993-1997.

In 1998, Moog acquired the Raytheon Aircraft Montek Company, located in Salt Lake City, Utah, which supplied flight controls for commercial airplanes and regional and business jets, as well as steering controls for tactical missiles and servovalves for both industrial and aerospace applications.

Moog expanded its industrial controls business with two further acquisitions - Hydrolux SARL, a Luxembourg manufacturer and designer of hydraulic power control systems for industrial machinery, and Microset Srl, an Italian manufacturer and designer of electronic controls for industrial machinery. Moog now claimed to be the world's market leader in industrial servovalves for a wide variety of industrial applications requiring the precise control of position, velocity and force.

By the end of the decade, Moog had more than doubled its total sales, and had also reorganised itself into three operating divisions:

- Aircraft controls
- Satellite and Launch Vehicle Controls
- Industrial controls

=== 2000s: Continued growth and further acquisitions ===
In 2000, it was announced that Moog would be working with both Boeing and Lockheed Martin on the next generation fighter aircraft for the US military, the Joint Strike Fighter program. This would ultimately become the F-35 Lightning fighter aircraft, and would be Moog's single largest ever program.

In 2004, Moog purchased Poly-Scientific from Northrop Grumman, a subsidiary specialising in slip rings, fiber optic rotary joints and motors that serve very broad markets from aviation and defence to industrial and medical. This resulted in Moog establishing a fourth business division, Components Division, alongside the existing three divisions.

In the mid-2000s, the company continued to grow, with new development programs such as the F-35 JSF and US National Missile Defense development initiative, where Moog supplied valves for the final stage kill vehicle, complemented by production programs such as the F-15 and the Hellfire tactical missile.

In 2006, the company established another new division, Medical Devices, following the acquisition of first Curlin Medical and then McKinley Medical. The division would focus on Moog's growing business supplying sensors, pumps and other components to the medical industry.

Moog closed the decade by buying GE Aviation's flight control actuation business, based in Wolverhampton in the United Kingdom. This ultimately became Moog Wolverhampton, Moog's largest business in the UK and its largest military aircraft facility outside the United States. The acquisition brought Moog contracts for the primary flight controls for the Eurofighter Typhoon, and the main engine lift system for the Rolls-Royce engine on the STOVL version of the F-35.

By the end of the decade, Moog's annual sales had grown from $630 million in 1999 to $1,849 million in 2009.

=== 2010s: Consolidation and focus on aerospace and defense ===
Moog entered the 2010s still pursuing growth through with further acquisitions, diversifying its space and defense business with the purchase of two companies specialising in security and surveillance. Moog's medical devices business also expanded via acquisitions, with Moog acquiring Ethox International, a manufacturer of medical disposables and provider of microbiology, toxicology, and sterilization services and Aitecs, a Lithuania-based manufacturer of infusion therapy pumps.

By the middle of the decade, however, management had shifted strategy towards concentrating on Moog's traditional strengths in aerospace and defence, while simplifying its corporate structure. Between 2016 and 2019 Moog divested some non-core businesses within its Medical Devices, Components and Industrial divisions, eventually consolidating all three divisions back into a single Industrial Division, leaving the business with the same structure as it had in 1999, organised around three divisions - Aircraft Controls, Space and Defense Controls and Industrial Systems.

At the same time, Moog benefited from rising production rates on several long-term military and commercial aircraft programs, particularly the F-35 program which had become the largest in the firm's history. Its Space and Defense Controls division also expanded across satellites, launch vehicles, precision-guided weapons, naval systems and surveillance technologies.

=== 2020s: Defense growth and public scrutiny ===
The decade began with the disruption caused by the COVID-19 pandemic, which sharply reduced demand in commercial aviation and industrial markets. Moog's sales nevertheless declined by only 1% in 2020, from $2.91 billion to $2.89 billion, as lower commercial aircraft and industrial sales were partly offset by increased demand for military aircraft and space and defense products. Its total backlog increased by 14% to $2.56 billion during the year.

In December 2020, Moog announced the acquisition of Genesys Aerosystems, based in Mineral Wells, TX, significantly boosting Moog's presence in the design and manufacture of avionics, electronic flight instrument systems and autopilot solutions.

As commercial aviation subsequently recovered, Moog also benefited from increased international defence expenditure and demand generated by growing geopolitical tensions. Production and development work included the F-35, new military aircraft programmes, missile systems, naval platforms, satellites and launch vehicles. By 2024, sales under United States Government contracts represented 38% of total company sales, while a further 9% came from foreign governments.

Pat Roche, previously President of the Industrial Division, was appointed as Chief Executive Officer in 2023. As Roche was not a United States citizen, this led to the U.S. Defense Counterintelligence and Security Agency (the “DCSA”) invalidating Moog's security clearance, which limited Moog's ability to enter into new government contracts that required facility security clearance. Moog resolved the issue by reorganizing its business, separating Aircraft Controls into distinct Military Aircraft and Commercial Aircraft divisions, with independent management structures. In this structure, Mark Graczyk, president and senior management official for Moog Military Aircraft, reported to the subsidiary's board of directors. The company thereafter reported four operating segments: Military Aircraft, Space and Defense, Commercial Aircraft and Industrial.

Between 2022 and 2025, annual sales increased from $3.04 billion to $3.86 billion. The company's growing defence business also brought increased public scrutiny. In October 2024, following a long investigation, Moog agreed a settlement of $1.7 million with the US Securities and Exchange Commission in relation to charges of breaches of the Foreign Corrupt Practices Act (FCPA).

Subsequently, following the outbreak of the Israel–Hamas war in October 2023, press coverage and campaigners drew attention to Moog components use in military aircraft and weapons systems supplied to Israel. In August 2025, four protesters staged a roof protest at Moog's Wolverhampton factory, protesting against the Moog's supply of F-35 and M-346 military aircraft components to Israel. In April 2026, M-346 shipments from Moog Wolverhampton to Israel were intercepted by Belgian customs authorities and seized, prompting a criminal investigation into alleged breaches of Belgian export and transit laws, and questions in Belgian parliament.

By the middle of the decade, Moog had become a substantially larger and more defense-dependent company, benefiting from increased military expenditure and renewed growth in commercial aviation, while facing greater scrutiny over the end use of its products and its position within global arms supply chains.

=== Moog at 75 ===
In 2026, Moog marked the 75th anniversary of its founding with a year-long programme of activities under the theme "Moog at 75". The company published a series of historical articles and videos reflecting on its development since 1951, highlighting milestones in aerospace, defense, industrial automation and space exploration, while also celebrating the contributions of employees throughout its history.

== Organization and divisions ==
As of 2023, Moog has been organized into four major business divisions:

- Military Aircraft (23%)
- Space and Defense (29%)
- Commercial Aircraft (23%)
- Industrial (25%)

=== Military Aircraft ===
Moog is a military aircraft Original Equipment Manufacturer (OEM), specializing in actuation, flight control systems, avionics and electro-optics. As an OEM, Moog supplies many of the leading defense prime contractors including Boeing, Lockheed Martin, Bell Textron, Leonardo S.p.A. and BAE Systems.

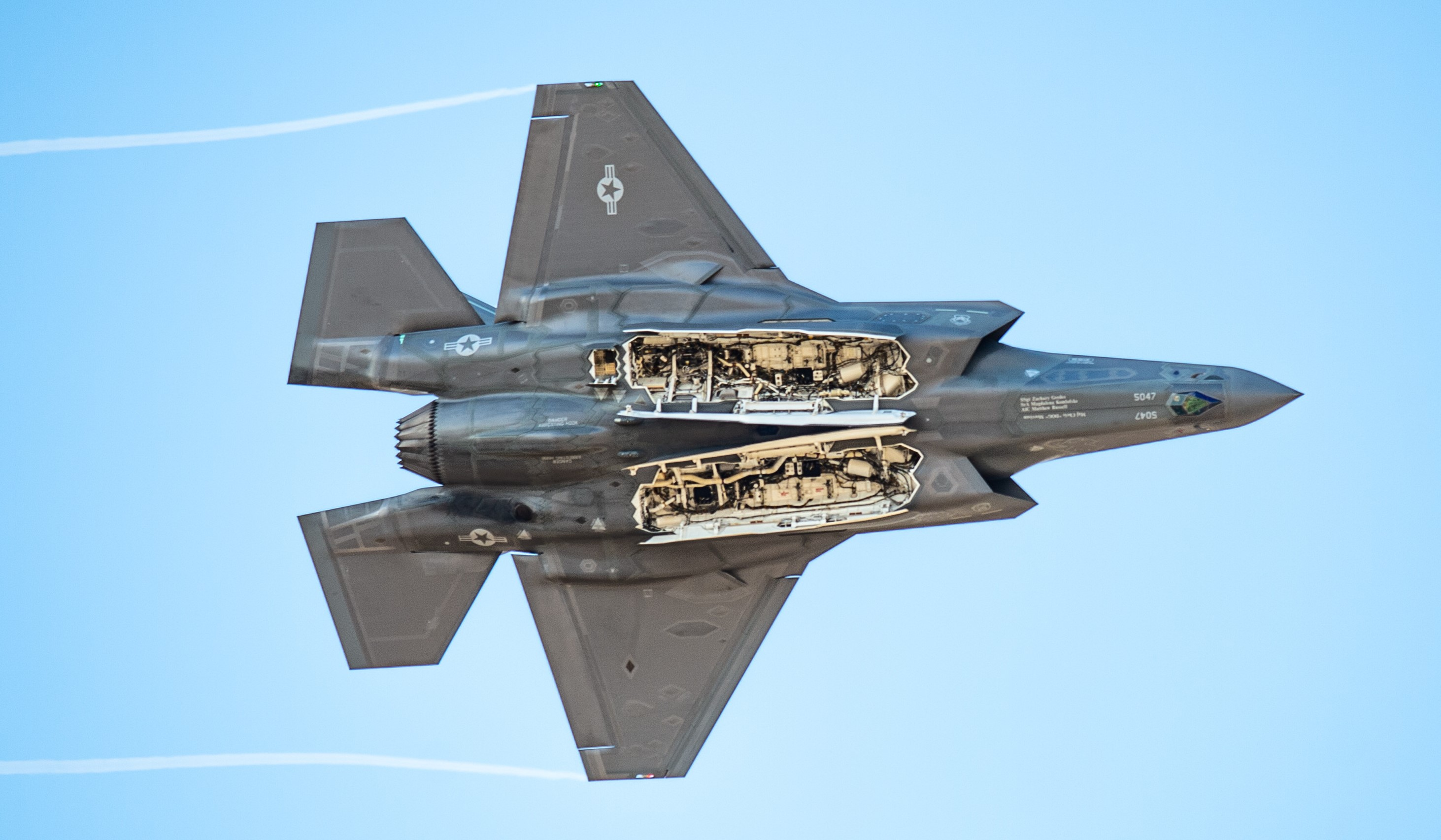
F-35A with all weapon bay doors open

Some of the military aircraft programs that Moog is an OEM for include:

- Lockheed Martin F-35 - in 2019 it was announced that Moog had been awarded contracts for the Primary Flight Control Actuation System, the Leading Edge Flap Drive System and the Wingfold Actuation System from Lockheed Martin for the F-35 Lightning II. The initial contract was for three years of production with a contract value in excess of $400 million dollars
- F-15 Eagle - In 2013 it was announced that Moog had been selected by Boeing to design the weapons bay actuation system for the F-15 Silent Eagle
- General Dynamics F-16 Fighting Falcon- Moog produces the Leading Edge Flap Drive System (LEFDS) for the F-16
- Northrop B-2 Spirit - In January 2025 it was announced that Moog had been awarded a contract by the US Department of Defense to remanufacture the flight control actuators for the B-2 stealth bomber
- Leonardo M-346 - Moog is the OEM for the Primary Flight Control Actuation System of the M-346, supplying parts to all current operators including Italy, Israel, Greece, Poland as well as the International Flight Training School in Sardinia and Cazaux Air Base in France
- Airbus A400M Atlas - Primary Flight Controls
- Bell V-280 Valor (Future Long Range Assault Aircraft) - Ruddervator, flaperon and swashplate actuators, pylon conversion actuators and flight control computers
- UH-60 Black Hawk - Moog is the OEM for several critical systems on the UH-60 helicopter, including flight controls and the vibration control actuation system (VCAS)

Through its acquisition of Genesys Technologies, Moog also provides avionics solutions for military aircraft and helicopters including some of the following platforms:

- Aero L-39 Skyfox
- Beechcraft T-6A

Moog's Military Aircraft Division has its major facilities located in Elma NY, Torrance CA, Fort Worth TX, Oklahoma City OK, Mineral Wells TX and Everett WA in the United States and in Wolverhampton in the United Kingdom. Moog also has an offshore manufacturing facility in Baguio City in the Philippines.

For a number of legacy aircraft platrforms, Moog also distributes its components through third party distributors specialising in Maintenance, Repair and Overhaul (MRO) services. In July 2026, Moog announced a strategic partnership with S3 AeroDefense to provide sales, program coordination, and aftermarket support for Moog's avionics solutions across multiple international markets.

=== Space and Defense ===
==== Missile systems ====
Moog develops missile guidance, flight control, actuation, propulsion, avionics, and navigation technologies for tactical missiles, hypersonic weapons, ballistic missiles, and air and missile defence systems. According to company materials, Moog has supplied missile control technologies since 1951 and produces electrohydraulic, electromechanical, electropneumatic, and electrohydrostatic actuation systems for missile applications. Moog states that its systems are used in hypersonic missile systems, tactical and strike weapons, long-range ballistic missiles, and missile defence platforms. The company has described capabilities including thrust vector control, fin and wing actuation systems, servo valves, propulsion modules, avionics, inertial navigation sensors, seeker head motors, and divert and attitude control systems.

Company materials also reference historical involvement in ballistic missile programmes including Jupiter, Titan, Atlas, Minuteman III, Peacekeeper, Sentinel, and Trident missile systems.

Moog has also developed defence systems relating to weapons carriage and release systems, turreted weapon systems, naval technologies, and security and surveillance systems. One such system is the Reconfigurable Integrated-weapons Platform (RIwP), developed for the Stryker vehicle used by the United States Army. Moog also produces the Lightweight Dual Rail Missile Launcher for the entire family of Hellfire missiles.

In January 2025, Moog and Lockheed Martin announced that Moog had been selected to provide actuators for the Patriot Advanced Capability (PAC-3) missiles for the US Army.

==== Power and Data ====
As a result of the acquisition of the Power and Data Technologies Group of the Kaydon Corporation in July 2005, Moog entered into the market of power and data solutions.

In March 2012, Moog acquired Protokraft LLC to build out its military fiber-optics and networking capabilities. In July 2025, Moog announced the acquisition of COTSWORKS Inc, an aerospace and defense fiber optics transceiver component manufacturer.

In June 2026 Moog integrated its COTSWORKS and Protokraft product lines into a new business, Rugged Optical Solutions, within the Power and Data division of Moog Space and Defense. Rugged Optical Solutions addresses aerospace and defense needs including:

- Radar systems used in ground vehicles
- Display systems for military and commercial aircraft
- Camera control command and mission computers on military tactical systems

Moog's Power and Data division is located in Blacksburg VA, Johnson City TN, Galax VA and Cleveland OH.

==== Space systems ====
Moog develops technologies for satellites, launch vehicles, and spaceflight systems, including propulsion systems, steering and motion controls, couplings, valves, and actuators.

The company has supplied systems and components for the Apollo program, the Space Shuttle, the International Space Station, Deep Space 1, Gravity Probe B, the Space Launch System, and Artemis I.

Moog has also supplied components for the Atlas V launch vehicle operated by United Launch Alliance, and for the Boeing 2707 supersonic transport programme.

In 2012, Moog acquired the In-Space Propulsion (ISP) business of American Pacific Corporation (AMPAC), formerly part of Atlantic Research Corporation (ARC). Products included the LEROS family of liquid-propellant thrusters, originally developed by Royal Ordnance in the United Kingdom. Moog operated a manufacturing facility at Westcott, Buckinghamshire until 2017, when the ISP business was acquired by Nammo.

=== Commercial Aircraft ===
The company's Commercial Aircraft division supplies flight control systems, actuation components and avionics to commercial aircraft, in addition to aftermarket support. Some of the commercial aircraft it supports include the following:

- Embraer E-Jet E2 family Moog has provided the Flight Control Computers and Primary Flight Control System for Embraer's family of E-2 jets since 2013.. In 2026, Embraer recognised Moog as "Supplier of the Year" in the Mechanical Systems Category
- Airbus A350 Primary and Secondary Flight Control Systems and Components
- Boeing 787 Dreamliner Primary Flight Control System
- Gulfstream G400/G500/G600 In 2014 it was announced that Moog would be supplying flight control systems for the Gulfstream G500 and G600 jets. In 2016, it was announced they would also be supplying aerospace test controllers

=== Industrial ===
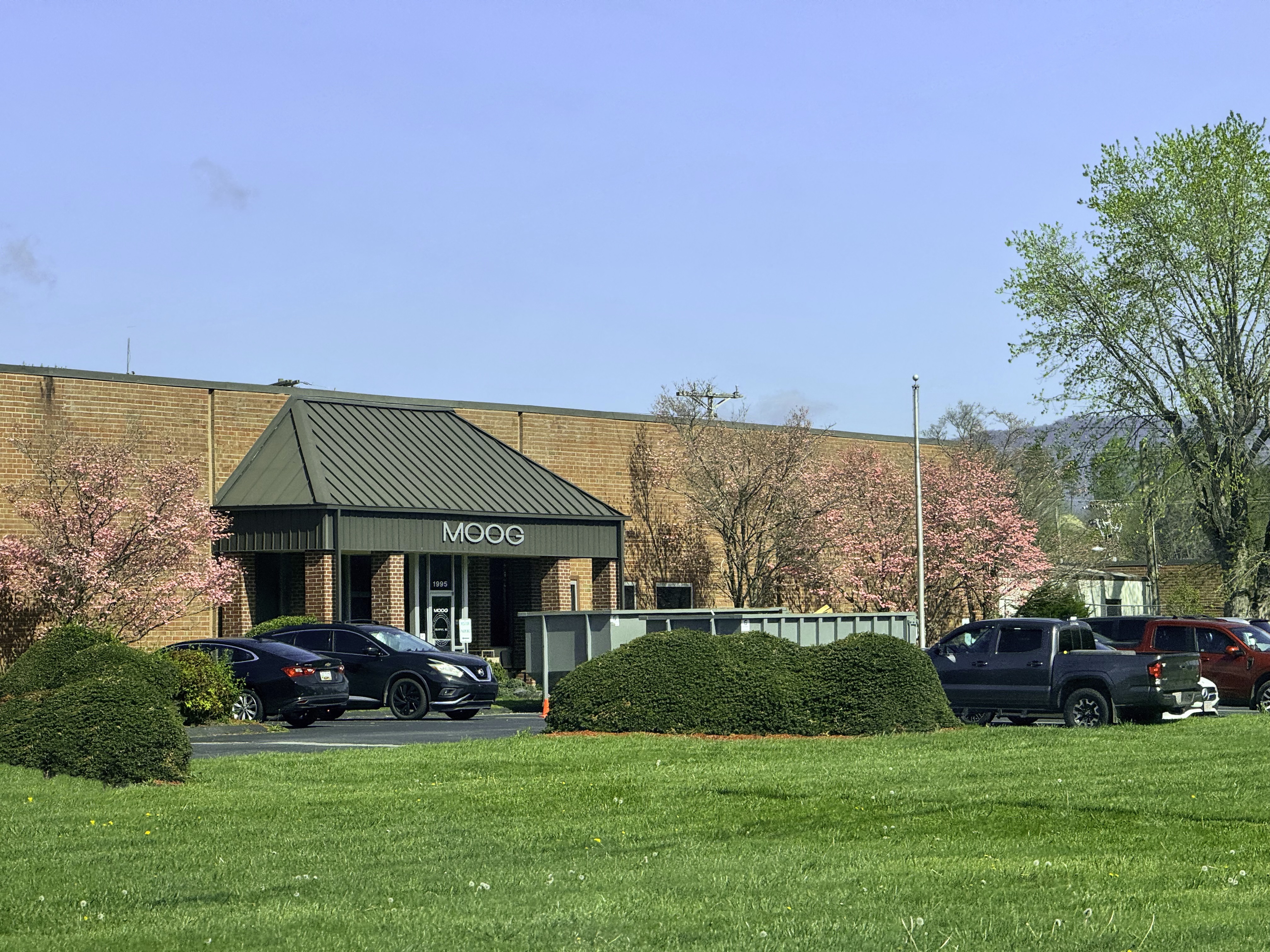
A Moog Inc. manufacturing plant in Peachtree, North Carolina

Moog provides industrial services. For the plastics and machinery market Moog designs, manufactures and integrates systems for all axes of injection and blow molding machines using both hydraulic and electric technology. In the power generation turbine market, Moog designs, manufactures and integrates control assemblies for fuel, steam and variable geometry control applications that include wind turbines. Metal forming markets use Moog designed and manufactured systems that provide control of position, velocity, force and other parameters. Heavy industry uses Moog's electrical and hydraulic servovalves for steel and aluminum mill equipment. For the material test markets, Moog supplies controls for automotive, structural and fatigue testing. The company's hydraulic and electromechanical motion simulation bases are used for the flight simulation and training markets. Other markets include material handling and testing, motorsport (including F1), carpet tufting, paper and lumber mills.

Medical devices, part of the industrial division, is Moog's newest segment, formed as a result of the acquisition of Curlin Medical, McKinley Medical, and Zevex International in 2006. Moog's primary products are electronic ambulatory infusion pumps and ambulatory enteral feeding pumps along with the necessary administration sets as well as disposable infusion pumps. Applications of these products include controlled delivery of fluids to the body, nutrition, post-operative pain management, regional anesthesia, chemotherapy and antibiotics. On January 23, 2009 Moog acquired the stock of Ethox International for $15.2 million in cash. Ethox is a medical products manufacturer and service provider based in Buffalo, New York.

On July 1, 2013, Moog announced the sale of its Buffalo operations of Ethox Medical to Dempsey Ventures. Annual sales from this division were approximately $12 million, with 88 full-time employees. Dempsey Ventures, based in Grand Rapids, Michigan, is a private equity firm focused on healthcare products. Its portfolio of companies in the anesthesia/respiratory space includes SunMed, Bay Medical and Ventlab. The Company also announced at the same time that it had engaged RBC Capital Markets LLC to assist with the strategic assessment of the remainder of its Medical Devices segment, including the possibility of divesting the entire segment.

== Notable projects ==
Moog provided products and technologies that were used on the B-2 Bomber and were also responsible for the flight control actuation system. Moog also contributed to the manufacture and development of both hydraulic and electric flight simulators, being the industry leader in Level D simulators. Moog's design was adapted to form the Spider-Man ride at Universal Studios adventure theme park. Moog also worked on several space contracts and designed part of the liquid rocket engine propulsion systems on the Voyager space probes and provided thruster valves that steered the spacecraft. Moog also made servo-actuators for four Space Shuttles.

Moog provided a control and motion system for the Wimbledon Centre Court retracting roof. This consisted of about 150 axes of AC servo-controlled electric actuators, AC servomotors, AC servodrives and the complete motion control system, including software. It was engineered by Moog's UK facility and enabled the Centre Court's first night-time tennis performance. Moog also provided a similar system for the No1 Court at Wimbledon.

Moog initiated an effort along with other aerospace suppliers to explore the application of blockchain technology in their supply chain. They developed the Moog VeriPart blockchain to track parts through the design, manufacturing, and service process. They have partnered with Aion Network in developing their blockchain.

In 2018, Moog and the University at Buffalo announced a project to use machine learning algorithms to differentiate acceptable from non-conforming areas of metal parts produced using additive manufacturing techniques. Areas considered improperly welded are identified from images evaluated by a convolutional neural network.

Moog also has notable track record of providing a range of control axes on Formula 1 racing cars and has been involved in this business for over 30 years. The technologies provide extremely high power:weight ratio and provide actuation for up to 10 axes on each car.

In 2019, Moog acquired the SureFly electric vertical takeoff and landing aircraft along with its related hybrid electric power system technology from Workhorse Group Inc. The acquisition was driven by an interest in electric power systems and was a step towards developing electric aircraft technology.

In 2019, Moog introduced a new project that intends to use a unique model based on block-chain and 3D printer to produce airplane parts, on demand.

=== F-35 short take-off and vertical landing (STOVL) system ===
Via its 2009 acquisition of GE Aviation's flight control actuation business in Wolverhampton, Moog was one of the companies that collaborated with Rolls-Royce and Pratt & Whitney in development of the Rolls-Royce LiftSystem, an aircraft propulsion system designed for use in the STOVL variant of the F-35 Lightning II. Moog developed and produced the actuation system to control the thrust vectoring nozzles and inlet fans.

=== Navigation aids ===
Moog Navigation and Surveillance Systems (NaSS) was established in 1955 and registered its first Tactical Air Navigation (TACAN) patents in 1962. That was the beginning of a long TACAN history. Since that time, Moog has designed and manufactured TACAN systems for use by militaries around the world including systems for fixed site, shipboard, mobile and man portable applications.

In 2009, Moog added engineering expertise as well as Distance Measuring Equipment (DME) and Direction Finding (DF) products through the acquisition of Fernau Avionics, Ltd.

In 2021, Moog sold the complete Navigation Aids (Navaids) business to Thales Group. At that moment the Navaids business represented less than 1% of Moog Inc.’s annual sales.

== Whistleblower scandal, corruption charges and pollution litigation ==
=== Aircraft Parts Whistleblower Case ===
In 2016, Charles Shi, a former Supply Chain Manager in the Aircraft Group at Moog's Shanghai subsidiary, raised concerns about allegedly defective aircraft components and irregular supplier documentation. According to allegations subsequently summarised by a US federal court, Shi believed a Chinese supplier had used substandard manufacturing processes and concealed irregularities in parts that entered Moog's supply chain for aircraft built for the US Department of Defense. The court recorded that a Moog investigation “at least partially substantiated” Shi's concerns, although Moog disputed that the components presented a flight-safety risk. Shi alleged that he was dismissed one day after escalating his concerns directly to Moog's CEO.

The US Federal Aviation Administration subsequently investigated Shi's safety concerns and, according to Reuters, substantiated two of his allegations. One issue was closed following corrective action, while a second remained open pending the full implementation of corrective action by Boeing and verification by the FAA. Boeing and Moog said that the necessary corrective actions had been taken, while Moog maintained that the parts concerned were not flight-safety-critical and had met specification during testing.

Shi later sued Moog under the US False Claims Act, alleging that he had been dismissed in retaliation for raising concerns about aircraft parts supplied for US military programmes. In 2020, a federal court allowed his retaliation claim against Moog Inc. to proceed, finding that he had adequately pleaded the claim; this was not a finding that his allegations were ultimately proven. The litigation ended in 2021 when Shi and Moog agreed to dismiss the claims with prejudice. Publicly available reporting does not disclose the terms of any agreement or establish liability by Moog.

=== Transparency assessment ===
In Transparency International UK’s Defence Companies Anti-Corruption Index, Moog Inc. was assessed as having a grade "F" (very low) level of transparency, placing it in the lowest band of the index.

In the Internal Controls category, Moog received a score of 8/100, with the report citing "There is no evidence that the company has a specific managerial-level employee who holds ultimate responsibility for implementing and managing the company’s anti-bribery and corruption programme ... There is no evidence that the company has a formal risk assessment procedure that is used to inform the company’s anti-bribery and corruption programme ... There is no clear evidence that the company’s anti-bribery and corruption programme is subject to audit or review."

Moog has referenced Transparency International indices in its own sustainability disclosures.

=== Litigation with L3Harris ===
In 2024, defense contractor L3Harris sued Moog Inc. in federal court, alleging that Moog as one of its suppliers failed to timely deliver critical satellite components and that parts it did provide were defective.

In 2025, Moog filed counterclaims, claiming breach of contract through repeated expansion of scope of work and oral change requests leading to Moog incurring major additional costs. The case is ongoing.

=== FCPA charges and settlement ===
In October 2024, the U.S. Securities and Exchange Commission announced that Moog Inc. had agreed to settle charges under the U.S. Foreign Corrupt Practices Act (FCPA) relating to conduct by its wholly owned Indian subsidiary, Moog Motion Controls Private Limited. According to the SEC, between 2020 and 2022 employees of the subsidiary paid bribes to Indian government officials to secure business and influence public tenders, including through the use of third-party agents and distributors.

According to the SEC, Moog Motion Control (MMCPL) had a "prevailing culture to win business at any cost, including improper means. The widespread misconduct at MMCPL reflected a breakdown in internal accounting controls, training, compliance, and tone at the top of the subsidiary."

The SEC found that the payments were improperly recorded as legitimate business expenses and that Moog had violated the FCPA’s books and records and internal accounting controls provisions. Without admitting or denying the findings, Moog agreed to cease and desist from further violations and to pay approximately $1.7 million, including a $1.1 million civil penalty and approximately $600,000 in disgorgement and interest.

Shortly after the Moog FCPA settlement was announced, in February 2025, President Trump signed an executive order directing Pam Bondi, the US attorney-general, to pause enforcement of FCPA. Trump told journalists who were present when he signed the order that “It’s going to mean a lot more business for America”.

=== California environmental pollution litigation ===
In June 2023, Moog was names as one of five companies that received legal notices from the Center for Environmental Health (CEH) alleging that they were discharging toxic PFAS chemicals into groundwater. Specifically, the notices alleged that Moog's facility in Torrance, California, was discharging perfluorooctane sulfonate (PFOS) and perfluorooctanoic acid (PFOA) in violation of the California Safe Drinking Water and Toxic Enforcement Act of 1986 (Proposition 65). CEH stated that it was targeting facilities located in low-income areas.

In December 2024, Moog agreed to settle the litigation for $150,000. The settlement also provided for facility cleaning, soil remediation, environmental testing and a prohibition on the use of PFAS-containing fume suppressants.

== Controversy over military aircraft exports to Israel ==
=== NGO and Press Concern over Moog's shipments to Israel ===
Israel has been operating the Leonardo M-346 fast jet trainer since 2013, and its "Flying Tiger" squadron currently operates 30 aircraft at Hatzerim Airbase, the largest fleet of M-346 fast jets in the world. According to company promotional literature, Moog Wolverhampton designed the complete Primary Flight Control Actuation system for this aircraft and is the original equipment manufacturer (OEM) supplier for production aircraft.

In November 2019, Moog announced that it had been awarded contracts for the Primary Flight Control Actuation System, the Leading Edge Flap Drive System and the Wingfold Actuation System on the F-35 fighter. The initial three year contract was worth over $400 million, approximately $135 million per annum, with production split between Moog's Wolverhampton and Elma, NY facilities.

In November 2024, Campaign Against Arms Trade cited Moog Wolverhampton Limited as one of a number of UK arms companies that was involved in the supply chain for Israel's F-35 fighter jet programme. The F-35 had been implicated in a number of airstrikes carried out in Gaza resulting in civilian casualties, in particular the Al-Mawasi airstrike which resulted in over 80 civilian casualties, of whom between 19-40 were killed.

On 2 July 2025, the United Nations Special Rapporteur on the situation of human rights in the Palestinian territories occupied since 1967, Francesca Albanese, published the report From Economy of Occupation to Economy of Genocide (A/HRC/59/23), which examined the role of corporations involved in Israel's military and security sectors. The report identified a number of major defence companies, including Lockheed Martin, Leonardo and Elbit Systems, and called on states and businesses to review their responsibilities under international law. Campaign groups opposing Moog's activities cited the report and the wider debate surrounding military supply chains as justification for continued protests at the Wolverhampton facility.

In July 2025, investigative outlets Declassified UK and The Ditch reported that Moog Aircraft Group had sent multiple shipments from its Wolverhampton facility to Hatzerim Airbase in Israel. According to the report, the consignments were addressed to the M-346 "Lavi" trainer aircraft programme, which is used by the Israeli Air Force to train pilots for frontline aircraft including the F-16 and F-35. The report noted that the UK government's September 2024 suspension of certain arms export licences to Israel did not extend to trainer aircraft, and argued that this distinction enabled continuing support for Israel's pilot training infrastructure.

Following this increased media attention, Moog worked closely with Staffordshire Police regarding security at its Wolverhampton facility. According to evidence filed in subsequent court proceedings, police officers conducted multiple visits to the site during July 2025 to review security arrangements, assess protest-related risks and advise on additional protective measures. The site was subsequently subject to regular police patrols.

On 21 August 2025, more than 700 British business leaders, founders and professionals signed an open letter organised by Business Leaders for Peace calling on the UK government to take further steps to prevent atrocities in Gaza and to uphold its obligations under international law. The initiative reflected growing engagement by figures from the business community in debates surrounding arms exports, corporate responsibility and the conflict in Gaza.

=== "Moog 4" Protest ===
On 26 August 2025, four pro-Palestinian protesters associated with Palestinian Martyrs' Justice entered Moog's Wolverhampton facility and occupied the roof of a building. Prosecutors alleged that the defendants caused damage to the site, including to roof structures and skylights. The protesters said that they had targeted the facility because of Moog's production of components for military aircraft used by Israel.

Four people were charged with criminal damage and were remanded in custody for six months before being released on bail. In September and October 2025, Moog also obtained a High Court injunction restricting protest activity at several of its United Kingdom facilities.

The first criminal trial began at Birmingham Crown Court in June 2026. On 18 June, after more than 17 hours of deliberation, the jury was unable to return verdicts on which the required majority could agree and was discharged. The Crown Prosecution Service subsequently confirmed that it would seek a retrial, which was scheduled for March 2027.

=== Belgian seizures and criminal investigation into illegal military exports ===
In April 2026, Belgian authorities reported the interception of shipments of military-related equipment at Liège Airport that had originated in the United Kingdom and were destined for Israel. Belgian media reported that the cargo was inspected following concerns that it contained controlled military items, and that a criminal investigation had been opened to determine whether export control or transit regulations had been breached.

According to Walloon minister-president, Adrien Dolimont, “We have to see if the legislation has been respected. Here, in this case, it’s clear that it hasn’t. No transit licence was requested; if it had been, it would have been refused”.

Statements from the Belgian government and media reports identified one of the seized shipments as coming from Moog's Wolverhampton factory and bound for Israel's M-346 program.

In June 2026, British MP John McDonnell submitted a written question to the Minister of Trade asking whether his Department planned to conduct a compliance investigation into the companies involved in the seizures. Minister for Trade Chris Bryant responded that this was "a matter for the Belgian authorities."

In a further statement to the Wallonian Parliament in July 2026, Minister-President Adrien Dolimont formally named Moog's shipment as being under criminal investigation (file number 26HUM14) by the Public Prosecutor, and noted that Moog had still not contacted the Belgian or Wallonian authorities concerning the matter.

=== Private Eye allegations ===
In May 2026, UK investigative newspaper Private Eye published allegations that, subsequent to the April 2026 seizures in Liège Airport, Moog's Wolverhampton facility continued to ship M-346 components to Israel along flight paths that overflew Belgian airspace, in apparent breach of the 16 January 2026 Royal Decree prohibiting use of Belgian airspace for any flights containing military materiel for use by the Israeli armed forces.

Private Eye alleged that Moog Wolverhampton obtained a new Open export licence from the UK Export Joint Control Unit in November 2025, which would imply that Moog's application for the licence was live at the same time as the M-346 shipments that are now under criminal investigation by the Belgian authorities.

In subsequent coverage, Private Eye also alleged that Moog Inc. was one of a number of US arms suppliers using East Midlands Airport as a transit hub for shipments of F-15 and F-16 spare parts from the US to Israel, with peaks in such shipments coinciding with peaks in Israeli air strikes against Gaza, Lebanon and Iran. The article went on to note that East Midlands Airport is majority-owned by a consortium of Greater Manchester public authorities, and therefore ultimately under the authority of the Mayor of Greater Manchester Andy Burnham.

=== Parliamentary discussion and civil society response ===
Following the Belgium seizures, a number of MPs wrote letters to the UK Government requesting clarification of its response to a British exporter breaking Belgian arms control laws, seemingly over a sustained period of time. Fleur Anderson MP and Sir Alan Campbell MP both wrote to John Healey, then Secretary of State for Defence, and Laura Trott MP wrote to Peter Kyle, Secretary of State for Business and Trade, expressing concern regarding the seizures in relation to the integrity of the UK’s export control regime, how compliance is monitored and enforced, and the importance of maintaining confidence among UK allies.

On 8 May 2026, a joint letter from Amnesty International, SaferWorld and Campaign Against Arms Trade was submitted to Liam Byrne MP, Chair of the Business and Trade Sub-Committee on Economic Security, Arms and Export Controls asking whether Moog Wolverhampton's export licences had been placed under review or suspension, and whether any assurances had been obtained from Moog that any future arms exports to Israel would be carried in full compliance with all applicable laws, including those of third countries such as Belgium.

On 9 June 2026, Campaign Against Arms Trade launched the lobbying campaign "Moog UK: Training Genocide Pilots", focusing on Moog's involvement supplying components for the F-35 programme and the Leonardo M-346 trainer aircraft used by the Israeli Air Force. The campaign argued that components for the M-346 should have been included in the United Kingdom's 2024 partial suspension of arms export licences to Israel and also raised concerns over the 2026 seizure by Belgian authorities of UK-origin military goods in transit to Israel, in relation to which Belgian officials confirmed that the original complaint concerned Moog. CAAT called for the suspension and review of relevant export licences and for an investigation into the continued export of trainer aircraft components to Israel.

On 15 June 2026, 61 British Members of Parliament and several members of the House of Lords from multiple political parties, including Baroness Sayeeda Warsi, former army officer Helen Maguire MP, Dr Simon Opher MP and Josh Babarinde MP submitted a joint letter to Peter Kyle asking the Department to clarify when it first become aware of Moog illegally shipping military components to Israel via Belgium, what communications had taken place between the Department, Moog and the Belgian authorities, and what measures, including review of export licences, it was taking to enforce compliance with legal obligations.
