= 2015 Budweiser Duels =

Qualifying races for the 2015 Daytona 500

Race details
- Location: Daytona International Speedway; Daytona Beach, Florida
- Course: Permanent racing facility 2.5 mi (4 km)
- Distance: Race 1: 60 laps, 150 mi (240 km); Race 2: 64 laps, 160 mi (256 km)
- Avg Speed: Race 1 144.462 mph (232.489 km/h); Race 2 144.724 mph (232.911 km/h)
- Weather: Clear skies with a temperature of 41 °F (5 °C); wind out of the WNW at 8 mph (13 km/h)

Race 1
- Pole position: Jeff Gordon (W)
- Most laps led: Matt Kenseth (W) (32)
- Winner: Dale Earnhardt Jr. (W)

Race 2
- Pole position: Jimmie Johnson (W)
- Most laps led: Jimmie Johnson (W) (40)
- Winner: Jimmie Johnson (W)

Television
- Network: Fox Sports 1 & MRN
- Announcers: Mike Joy, Darrell Waltrip and Larry McReynolds (Television); Joe Moore and Jeff Striegle (Booth); Dave Moody (1 & 2), Mike Bagley (Backstretch) and Kyle Rickey (3 & 4) (Turns) (Radio)

The 2015 Budweiser Duels were a pair of NASCAR Sprint Cup Series stock car races that were held on February 19, 2015, at Daytona International Speedway in Daytona Beach, Florida. Both contested over 60 laps, they were the qualifying races for the 2015 Daytona 500. Hendrick Motorsports swept both races, with Dale Earnhardt Jr. winning the first Duel and Jimmie Johnson winning the second Duel.

== Report ==
=== Background ===
Daytona International Speedway, where the races were held.

Daytona International Speedway is one of six superspeedways to hold NASCAR races, the others being Michigan International Speedway, Auto Club Speedway, Indianapolis Motor Speedway, Pocono Raceway and Talladega Superspeedway. The standard track at Daytona International Speedway is a four-turn superspeedway that is 2.5 miles (4.0 km) long. The track's turns are banked at 31 degrees, while the front stretch, the location of the finish line, is banked at 18 degrees.

== Practice ==
=== First practice (February 14) ===
Ricky Stenhouse Jr. was the fastest in the first practice session with a time of 44.413 and a speed of 202.643 mph (326.122 km/h).

Pos	No.	Driver	Team	Manufacturer	Time	Speed
1	17	Ricky Stenhouse Jr.	Roush Fenway Racing	Ford	44.413	202.643
2	9	Sam Hornish Jr.	Richard Petty Motorsports	Ford	44.512	202.193
3	6	Trevor Bayne (W)	Roush Fenway Racing	Ford	44.512	202.193
Official first practice results

=== Second practice (February 14) ===
Michael McDowell was the fastest in the second practice session with a time of 45.153 and a speed of 199.322 mph (320.778 km/h). Ryan Newman was forced to change engines after blowing one half an hour into the session. He will have to start from the rear in one of the Duel races. Martin Truex Jr. also dealt with engine gremlins due to a crack in his car's oil pan, but did not change engines.

Pos	No.	Driver	Team	Manufacturer	Time	Speed
1	95	Michael McDowell	Leavine Family Racing	Ford	45.153	199.322
2	48	Jimmie Johnson (W)	Hendrick Motorsports	Chevrolet	45.155	199.314
3	33	Ty Dillon	Richard Childress Racing	Chevrolet	45.158	199.300
Official second practice results

== Pole qualifying ==
"I wasn't behind the 44 [Sorenson]. He came flying around, come up on the apron, jumps in front of me, then runs over the 51 [Allgaier], stacks us all up and then I run into him. It's idiotic to be out here doing this anyway. There's no sense in being able to try to put on some cute show for whatever the hell this is. Then you have a guy out there doing this in desperation. There's no reason to be out here. These guys have spent six months working on these cars, busting their butts on these cars. But it ain't his fault. It's NASCAR's fault for putting us out in the middle of this crap for nothing. We used to come down here and worry about who would set on the front pole in the biggest race of the year. Now all we do is come down here and worry about how a start‑and‑park like this out of desperation is going to knock us out of the Daytona 500. We've been in meetings for 45 minutes just trying to figure out what in the hell everybody is going to do just so we can make the race. It's stupid. There's no sense in doing this."

— Clint Bowyer, after his incident in qualifying.

The pole qualifying took place at 1:00 p.m. Eastern time on Sunday, February 15, a week prior to the Daytona 500 race itself. For the first time in the history of the Daytona 500, NASCAR eliminated the traditional single car qualifying format for the pole qualifying and introduced the Formula One-style knockout qualifying format, first introduced in the 2014 season. Unlike the other tracks however, the pole qualifying consists of three sessions of five minutes each, first introduced in the fall Talladega race:

- NASCAR randomly split the field into two groups for session 1 (one group had 25 cars, the other had 24). Each group had its own five minutes of track time. The fastest 24 cars overall from either group will advance to session 2.
- After a ten-minute break, these 24 cars would get five minutes of track time for session 2. The qualifying times from session 1 would reset prior to the start of session 2. The fastest 12 cars in session 2 will advance to session 3.
- Following a seven-minute break, these 12 cars would then compete for the top two guaranteed spots in the final five-minute session. Again, the qualifying times from session 2 would reset prior to the start of session 3.

The top two times in the final qualifying session will be locked in the front row of the Daytona 500 starting grid, while the other 41 starting spots would be determined by the two Budweiser Duels the following Thursday.

In what will be his final Daytona 500 start, Jeff Gordon won the pole with a time of 44.711 and a speed of 201.293 mph (323.950 km/h). Gordon felt that in the new qualifying format, "the driver finally gets to play a role". He also stated that he had "a fast race car" and that the pole position was "one of the most gratifying poles I've had, not just because it's my final Daytona". His teammate Jimmie Johnson will start right alongside in 2nd. In the first round of qualifying, Clint Bowyer tried to go under Reed Sorenson when he got hit in the rear by Carl Edwards and turned right into Sorenson. Both cars slammed the wall and collected Bobby Labonte and J. J. Yeley. Denny Hamlin may have taken some damage. The session was red flagged with a minute and 22 seconds left. After the red flag was lifted, no one was able to make it back to the line before time expired. Upon exiting his car, Bowyer vented his frustrations at the Daytona qualifying procedure.

The cars of Dale Earnhardt Jr. and Denny Hamlin failed post-qualifying inspection and will start from the rear of the field in their respective Duel races. Earnhardt's car was found to be too low on the left front, while the track bar on Hamlin's car was found to be 3–3.75 inches (76–95 mm) beyond the maximum allowed. Both drivers expressed thoughts on Twitter post-penalties, with both looking forward to moving up the order in the Duels.

=== Qualifying results ===
Pos	No.	Driver	Team	Manufacturer	R1	R2	R3	Grid
1	24	Jeff Gordon (W)	Hendrick Motorsports	Chevrolet	45.138	44.700	44.711	1 (1)
2	48	Jimmie Johnson (W)	Hendrick Motorsports	Chevrolet	44.489	44.571	44.746	1 (2)
3	11	Denny Hamlin (Note: The qualifying times for Denny Hamlin and Dale Earnhardt Jr. were disallowed post-qualifying, for technical infractions. They will start from the rear of the field in their respective Duel races.)	Joe Gibbs Racing	Toyota	45.036	44.590	44.791	24 (2)
4	20	Matt Kenseth (W)	Joe Gibbs Racing	Toyota	44.865	44.996	44.952	2 (1)
5	18	Kyle Busch	Joe Gibbs Racing	Toyota	44.728	45.001	44.958	2 (2)
6	5	Kasey Kahne	Hendrick Motorsports	Chevrolet	44.845	45.113	45.030	3 (1)
7	19	Carl Edwards	Joe Gibbs Racing	Toyota	45.845	45.009	45.492	3 (2)
8	33	Ty Dillon	Richard Childress Racing	Chevrolet	45.378	44.848	45.568	4 (1)
9	3	Austin Dillon	Richard Childress Racing	Chevrolet	45.079	44.752	45.694	4 (2)
10	88	Dale Earnhardt Jr. (W)	Hendrick Motorsports	Chevrolet	44.806	45.017	46.135	25 (1)
11	1	Jamie McMurray (W)	Chip Ganassi Racing	Chevrolet	44.500	44.632	46.600	5 (1)
12	78	Martin Truex Jr.	Furniture Row Racing	Chevrolet	45.376	45.059	47.200	5 (2)
13	83	Johnny Sauter	BK Racing	Toyota	45.096	45.404	—	6 (1)
14	16	Greg Biffle	Roush Fenway Racing	Ford	45.209	45.575	—	6 (2)
15	6	Trevor Bayne (W)	Roush Fenway Racing	Ford	45.219	45.626	—	7 (1)
16	9	Sam Hornish Jr.	Richard Petty Motorsports	Ford	45.199	45.629	—	7 (2)
17	43	Aric Almirola	Richard Petty Motorsports	Ford	44.473	45.639	—	8 (1)
18	17	Ricky Stenhouse Jr.	Roush Fenway Racing	Ford	44.481	45.728	—	8 (2)
19	2	Brad Keselowski	Team Penske	Ford	45.212	46.546	—	9 (1)
20	21	Ryan Blaney	Wood Brothers Racing	Ford	45.207	46.564	—	9 (2)
21	22	Joey Logano	Team Penske	Ford	45.269	46.574	—	10 (1)
22	55	Michael Waltrip (W)	Michael Waltrip Racing	Toyota	44.689	47.240	—	10 (2)
23	23	J. J. Yeley	BK Racing	Toyota	45.168	0.000	—	11 (1)
24	32	Bobby Labonte	Go FAS Racing	Ford	45.211	0.000	—	11 (2)
25	27	Paul Menard	Richard Childress Racing	Chevrolet	45.380	—	—	12 (1)
26	7	Alex Bowman	Tommy Baldwin Racing	Chevrolet	45.402	—	—	12 (2)
27	47	A. J. Allmendinger	JTG Daugherty Racing	Chevrolet	45.406	—	—	13 (1)
28	31	Ryan Newman (W)	Richard Childress Racing	Chevrolet	45.414	—	—	13 (2)
29	4	Kevin Harvick (W)	Stewart–Haas Racing	Chevrolet	45.456	—	—	14 (1)
30	41	Kurt Busch	Stewart–Haas Racing	Chevrolet	45.460	—	—	14 (2)
31	14	Tony Stewart	Stewart–Haas Racing	Chevrolet	45.462	—	—	15 (1)
32	10	Danica Patrick	Stewart–Haas Racing	Chevrolet	45.464	—	—	15 (2)
33	13	Casey Mears	Germain Racing	Chevrolet	45.467	—	—	16 (1)
34	62	Brian Scott	Premium Motorsports	Chevrolet	45.494	—	—	16 (2)
35	46	Michael Annett	HScott Motorsports	Chevrolet	45.789	—	—	17 (1)
36	51	Justin Allgaier	HScott Motorsports	Chevrolet	45.794	—	—	17 (2)
37	42	Kyle Larson	Chip Ganassi Racing	Chevrolet	46.015	—	—	18 (1)
38	38	David Gilliland	Front Row Motorsports	Ford	46.072	—	—	18 (2)
39	95	Michael McDowell	Leavine Family Racing	Ford	46.083	—	—	19 (1)
40	26	Jeb Burton (R)	BK Racing	Toyota	46.153	—	—	19 (2)
41	15	Clint Bowyer	Michael Waltrip Racing	Toyota	46.155	—	—	20 (1)
42	44	Reed Sorenson	Team XTREME Racing	Chevrolet	46.159	—	—	20 (2)
43	29	Justin Marks	RAB Racing	Toyota	46.231	—	—	21 (1)
44	34	David Ragan	Front Row Motorsports	Ford	46.284	—	—	21 (2)
45	35	Cole Whitt	Front Row Motorsports	Ford	46.389	—	—	22 (1)
46	98	Josh Wise	Phil Parsons Racing	Ford	46.539	—	—	22 (2)
47	40	Landon Cassill	Hillman–Circle Sport	Chevrolet	46.560	—	—	23 (1)
48	66	Mike Wallace	Premium Motorsports	Toyota	46.751	—	—	23 (2)
49	30	Ron Hornaday Jr.	The Motorsports Group	Chevrolet	47.172	—	—	24 (1)
Official qualifying results

Key	Meaning
(1)	Race One
(2)	Race Two

== Practice (post-qualifying) ==
=== Third practice (February 18) ===
Kyle Busch was the fastest in the third practice session with a time of 44.826 and a speed of 200.776 mph (323.118 km/h). During this session, there was a four car wreck on the backstretch that involved Michael Annett, Jeb Burton, Denny Hamlin and Danica Patrick. It started when Hamlin pulled out of line and Patrick tried to follow him, but made contact with the right-front corner of Hamlin's car when she over-corrected and hit the wall. Michael Annett tried to go high around Patrick on the outside when he got turned by Jeb Burton. Patrick, Annett and Burton all switched to backup cars. After the incident, Patrick stated that her car "sort of just started turning toward the right, the back end was coming around and it swapped ends" and that Hamlin was trying to "make a third lane in the middle and it felt like it must have caught my bumper". Hamlin felt that Patrick had intended to block his path, stating that a driver has "to give a little bit of extra room in practice" and that if he "had to guess, she probably saw in her mirror that I was going down there and tried to stay in front of me".

Pos	No.	Driver	Team	Manufacturer	Time	Speed
1	18	Kyle Busch	Joe Gibbs Racing	Toyota	44.826	200.776
2	48	Jimmie Johnson (W)	Hendrick Motorsports	Chevrolet	44.881	200.530
3	6	Trevor Bayne (W)	Roush Fenway Racing	Ford	44.988	200.053
Official third practice results

=== Fourth practice (February 18) ===
Alex Bowman was the fastest in the fourth practice session with a time of 44.889 and a speed of 200.495 mph (322.665 km/h).

Pos	No.	Driver	Team	Manufacturer	Time	Speed
1	7	Alex Bowman	Tommy Baldwin Racing	Chevrolet	44.889	200.495
2	5	Kasey Kahne	Hendrick Motorsports	Chevrolet	44.897	200.459
3	6	Trevor Bayne (W)	Roush Fenway Racing	Ford	44.913	200.387
Official fourth practice results

=== Final practice (February 19) ===
Kyle Larson was the fastest in the final practice session with a time of 46.705 and a speed of 192.699 mph (310.119 km/h). This session had only five drivers take part in it doing single car runs.

Pos	No.	Driver	Team	Manufacturer	Time	Speed
1	42	Kyle Larson	Chip Ganassi Racing	Chevrolet	46.705	192.699
2	35	Cole Whitt	Front Row Motorsports	Ford	47.192	190.710
3	46	Michael Annett	HScott Motorsports	Chevrolet	47.344	190.098
Official fifth practice results

== Races ==
=== Race One ===
==== First-half ====
===== Start =====
The first race started at 7:19 p.m. Eastern time when Jeff Gordon led the field to the green. Matt Kenseth took the lead with the bottom lane to lead lap one. The first caution of the race flew on lap 17 after Casey Mears blew an engine in turn 1. Kenseth and Gordon swapped the lead on pit road, and Gordon exited as the leader for the restart on lap 24. Michael Annett was forced to drop to the end of the longest line because his crew was over the wall too soon.

===== Trouble in the tri-oval =====
Kenseth used the bottom line and jumped in front of Gordon to take back the lead on lap 26, just ahead of the race's second caution when Johnny Sauter crashed in the tri-oval, following contact with A. J. Allmendinger, while Aric Almirola also picked up some damage to his car.

Sauter stated that he was "just riding along" and that he was "trying to mind my business" before the contact with Allmendinger, with the point of impact being "in the left rear quarter panel". He also stated that it was "a bummer deal" for himself and his BK Racing team. Sauter and Allmendinger did however, make the starting lineup for the race, on their qualifying speeds. Allmendinger apologised for the contact with Sauter, while stating that his JTG Daugherty Racing car was fast, while also criticizing the racing that was occurring, stating that he "was trying to stay out of trouble and got put in the middle and I was trying to bail out of the middle". Michael McDowell dropped to the end of the longest line, for the restart on lap 33, after his crew was over the wall too soon.

==== Second-half ====
Dale Earnhardt Jr. used a slight push from the bottom line to take the lead on lap 35. Kenseth took the lead back from Earnhardt on the bottom to take back the lead on lap 39. On lap 43, Earnhardt used a slingshot move to overtake Kenseth for good. The third caution of the race flew on lap 51 when Trevor Bayne got loose, came down on Kyle Larson and hit the wall in turn 1. During this period, Ty Dillon broke his gear shifter. The race restarted with five laps to go and Earnhardt Jr. held off Jeff Gordon to win race one. Earnhardt praised the work of his spotter TJ Majors in victory lane, stating that he "gave me the information I needed to make the moves I needed" and that he was "looking forward to getting to Sunday and trying to get another Daytona 500 win". Dillon, finished 16th after the gearshift issues, and was able to make the field. He described the result as "hard to explain" and that he had "been coming here since I was a kid watching my grandfather's cars race". Ron Hornaday Jr. and Justin Marks failed to make the race.

==== Results ====
Pos	Grid	No.	Driver	Team	Manufacturer	Laps
1	25	88	Dale Earnhardt Jr. (W)	Hendrick Motorsports	Chevrolet	60
2	1	24	Jeff Gordon (W)	Hendrick Motorsports	Chevrolet	60
3	10	22	Joey Logano	Team Penske	Ford	60
4	15	14	Tony Stewart	Stewart–Haas Racing	Chevrolet	60
5	20	15	Clint Bowyer	Michael Waltrip Racing	Toyota	60
6	14	4	Kevin Harvick (W)	Stewart–Haas Racing	Chevrolet	60
7	3	5	Kasey Kahne	Hendrick Motorsports	Chevrolet	60
8	5	1	Jamie McMurray (W)	Chip Ganassi Racing	Chevrolet	60
9	23	40	Landon Cassill	Hillman–Circle Sport	Chevrolet	60
10	22	35	Cole Whitt	Front Row Motorsports	Ford	60
11	12	27	Paul Menard	Richard Childress Racing	Chevrolet	60
12	19	95	Michael McDowell	Leavine Family Racing	Ford	60
13	11	23	J. J. Yeley	BK Racing	Toyota	60
14	17	46	Michael Annett	HScott Motorsports	Chevrolet	60
15	18	42	Kyle Larson	Chip Ganassi Racing	Chevrolet	60
16	4	33	Ty Dillon	Richard Childress Racing	Chevrolet	60
17	2	20	Matt Kenseth (W)	Joe Gibbs Racing	Toyota	60
18	21	29	Justin Marks	RAB Racing	Toyota	60
19	9	2	Brad Keselowski	Team Penske	Ford	60
20	8	43	Aric Almirola	Richard Petty Motorsports	Ford	60
21	24	30	Ron Hornaday Jr.	The Motorsports Group	Chevrolet	60
22	7	6	Trevor Bayne (W)	Roush Fenway Racing	Ford	60
23	13	47	A. J. Allmendinger	JTG Daugherty Racing	Chevrolet	27
24	6	83	Johnny Sauter	BK Racing	Toyota	27
25	16	13	Casey Mears	Germain Racing	Chevrolet	17

=== Race 2 ===
==== First-half ====
===== Start =====
Before the start, Josh Wise stalled at the entrance of pit road and took his car to the garage. This ultimately eliminated him from racing in the Daytona 500. The second race started 18 minutes late at 9:19 p.m. with Jimmie Johnson leading the field to the green flag. Kyle Busch took the lead on lap one. The first caution of the race flew on lap 19 for a spin by David Ragan, exiting turn 4. Ragan had cut across the nose of Justin Allgaier and got turned down onto the apron, making contact with the inside wall. Kyle Busch was first off pit road, but he was caught speeding on pit road and was forced to drop to the end of the line, allowing Johnson to retake the lead for the restart, on lap 25. Allgaier was also sent to the rear, as his pit crew came across the wall too soon.

==== Second-half ====
The second caution of the race flew on lap 37 for a multi-car wreck in the tri-oval. It started exiting turn 4 when Jeb Burton turned down into Sam Hornish Jr. who turned into Alex Bowman. Austin Dillon destroyed his splitter driving through the grass trying to avoid the wreck, which caused the race to be red flagged for five minutes. Neither Bowman nor Burton qualified for the Daytona 500. The race restarted with 20 laps to go. With 14 laps to go, Kurt Busch was given a drive-through penalty for passing below the double yellow line. The third caution of the race flew with three laps to go for a four car wreck in turn 3. Denny Hamlin gave Danica Patrick a push which turned her around and collected Brian Scott and Bobby Labonte. Scott failed to qualify for the Daytona 500 as a result, while Labonte relied upon a past champion's provisional to get into the race.

===== Finish =====
In a green–white–checker finish, Johnson held off a last lap charge by Kyle Busch and Carl Edwards to win the race. Johnson defined the Speedweeks at Daytona as "awesome" for his Hendrick Motorsports team, sweeping the Duels and the front row for the Daytona 500. Johnson also called his car as "mad fast". Patrick confronted Hamlin on pit road after the race. After the confrontation, Patrick told reporters that she had "no explanation for that", while also stating Hamlin was in the wrong by believing "that he's taking the air and getting it off the spoiler, and he's not squared up either".

==== Results ====
Pos	Grid	No.	Driver	Team	Manufacturer	Laps
1	1	48	Jimmie Johnson (W)	Hendrick Motorsports	Chevrolet	64
2	2	18	Kyle Busch	Joe Gibbs Racing	Toyota	64
3	3	19	Carl Edwards	Joe Gibbs Racing	Toyota	64
4	6	16	Greg Biffle	Roush Fenway Racing	Ford	64
5	5	78	Martin Truex Jr.	Furniture Row Racing	Chevrolet	64
6	9	21	Ryan Blaney	Wood Brothers Racing	Ford	64
7	20	44	Reed Sorenson	Team XTREME Racing	Chevrolet	64
8	23	66	Mike Wallace	Premium Motorsports	Toyota	64
9	17	29	Justin Marks	RAB Racing	Toyota	64
10	15	10	Danica Patrick	Stewart–Haas Racing	Chevrolet	64
11	13	31	Ryan Newman (W)	Richard Childress Racing	Chevrolet	64
12	14	41	Kurt Busch	Stewart–Haas Racing	Chevrolet	64
13	18	38	David Gilliland	Front Row Motorsports	Ford	64
14	21	34	David Ragan	Front Row Motorsports	Ford	64
15	4	3	Austin Dillon	Richard Childress Racing	Chevrolet	64
16	8	17	Ricky Stenhouse Jr.	Roush Fenway Racing	Ford	64
17	16	62	Brian Scott	Premium Motorsports	Chevrolet	64
18	24	11	Denny Hamlin	Joe Gibbs Racing	Toyota	64
19	10	55	Michael Waltrip (W)	Michael Waltrip Racing	Toyota	64
20	11	32	Bobby Labonte	Go FAS Racing	Ford	60
21	7	9	Sam Hornish Jr.	Richard Petty Motorsports	Ford	36
22	19	26	Jeb Burton (R)	BK Racing	Toyota	36
23	12	7	Alex Bowman	Tommy Baldwin Racing	Chevrolet	36
24	22	98	Josh Wise	Phil Parsons Racing	Ford	1

== Media ==
=== Television ===
Fox Sports 1
Booth announcers	Pit reporters
Lap-by-lap: Mike Joy; Color-commentator: Larry McReynolds; Color commentator: Darrell Waltrip	Matt Yocum; Jamie Little; Chris Neville

=== Radio ===
MRN Radio
Booth announcers	Turn announcers	Pit reporters
Lead announcer: Joe Moore; Announcer: Jeff Striegle	Turns 1 & 2: Dave Moody; Backstretch: Mike Bagley; Turns 3 & 4: Kyle Rickey	Winston Kelley; Steve Post; Alex Hayden
