= Josh Wise =

American racing driver

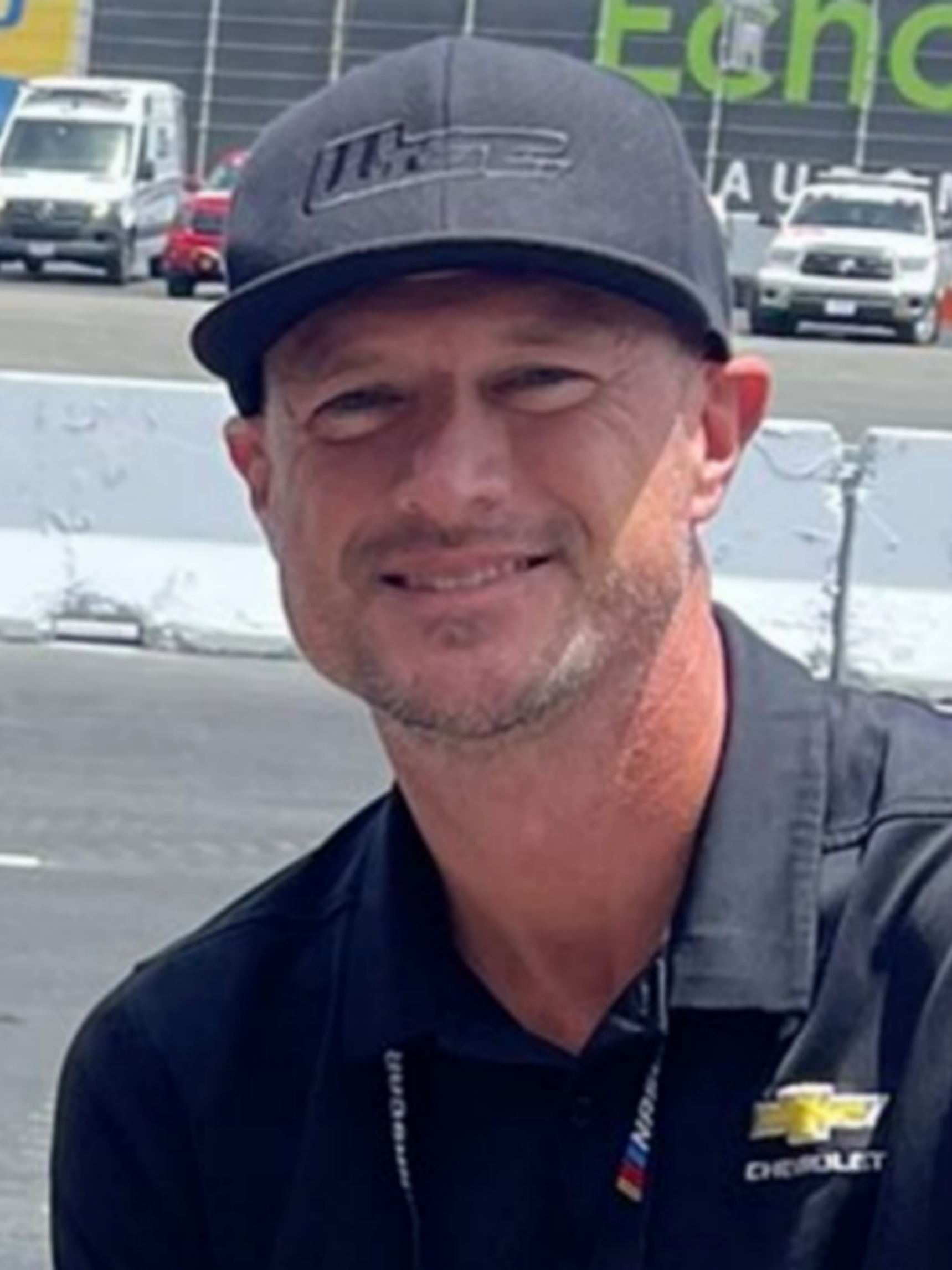
- Wise at Sonoma Raceway in 2024
- Achievements: 1999 USAC MCIWorld.com TQ Midget Car Series Champion; 2009 Pepsi Nationals Winner
- Awards: 1999 USAC MCIWorld.com TQ Midget Car Series Rookie of the Year; 2014 NASCAR Sprint All-Star Race Fan Vote Winner

NASCAR Cup Series career
- 156 races run over 6 years
- 2016 position: 40th
- Best finish: 36th (2014)
- First race: 2011 GEICO 400 (Chicagoland)
- Last race: 2016 AAA Texas 500 (Texas)
| Wins | Top tens | Poles |
|---|---|---|
| 0 | 1 | 0 |

NASCAR O'Reilly Auto Parts Series career
- 150 races run over 9 years
- 2016 position: 124th
- Best finish: 16th (2011)
- First race: 2007 Kroger 200 (IRP)
- Last race: 2016 Drive Sober 200 (Dover)
| Wins | Top tens | Poles |
|---|---|---|
| 0 | 6 | 0 |

NASCAR FedEx Freight Truck Series career
- 12 races run over 4 years
- 2016 position: 106th
- Best finish: 33rd (2007)
- First race: 2007 O'Reilly Auto Parts 250 (Kansas)
- Last race: 2016 UNOH 175 (New Hampshire)
| Wins | Top tens | Poles |
|---|---|---|
| 0 | 2 | 0 |
- Statistics up to date as of October 13, 2023.

Joshua Eric Wise is an American athletic trainer and former professional stock car racing and dirt track racing driver. He is currently a trainer for Chevrolet's development program for upcoming drivers and oversees driver development for Pinnacle Racing Group.

Wise competed in stock car racing in NASCAR. Wise's NASCAR Xfinity Series career included stints with Baker Curb Racing, Turner Motorsports, JR Motorsports and TMG. In the NASCAR Cup Series, he drove for Front Row Motorsports, Phil Parsons Racing and The Motorsports Group, among others.

== Early career ==
In 1999, Wise entered into the United States Auto Club (USAC) at sixteen years of age in USAC's 3/4 Midget Division. He won the USAC Championship, earning four wins at Irwindale Speedway along with rookie of the year honors. This championship made Josh the youngest champion in USAC history, in 44 years of sanctioned races.

For 2000, Wise made the move to USAC's Western States Midget Division, racing only the pavement events. In his rookie year Wise captured two wins at Madera Speedway and one at Stockton 99, beating midget legend Sleepy Tripp to the checkers. For his first win at Madera Speedway, Wise started last and came through the field to take the win in a race that was called short due to a bad accident during the feature.

Wise first appeared in the ARCA Re/MAX Series in 2006 with Eddie Sharp Racing. He ran two races and earned one top-ten. In 2007, Wise returned to the team to run eleven races, earning one pole position and six top-tens, including three second-place finishes.

== NASCAR ==
In 2007, it was announced that Wise would drive part-time for Darrell Waltrip Motorsports in conjunction with Michael Waltrip Racing.

Wise earned one top-ten finish, a fifth-place finish at IRP. Wise made three series starts in 2009 for Xxxtreme Motorsport, failing to finish any of them. In 2009, Wise also raced seventeen USAC sprint car races winning one race and getting 12 top fives. Wise raced 15 USAC national midget races winning three and taking eight top-fives. Wins included the Belleville Nationals preliminary night and the Firemans Nationals.

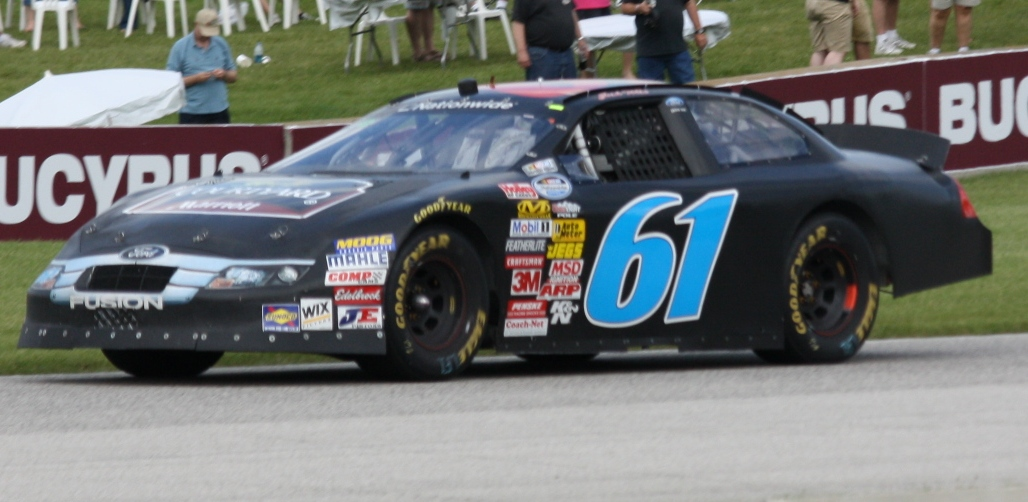
2010 Nationwide car at Road America

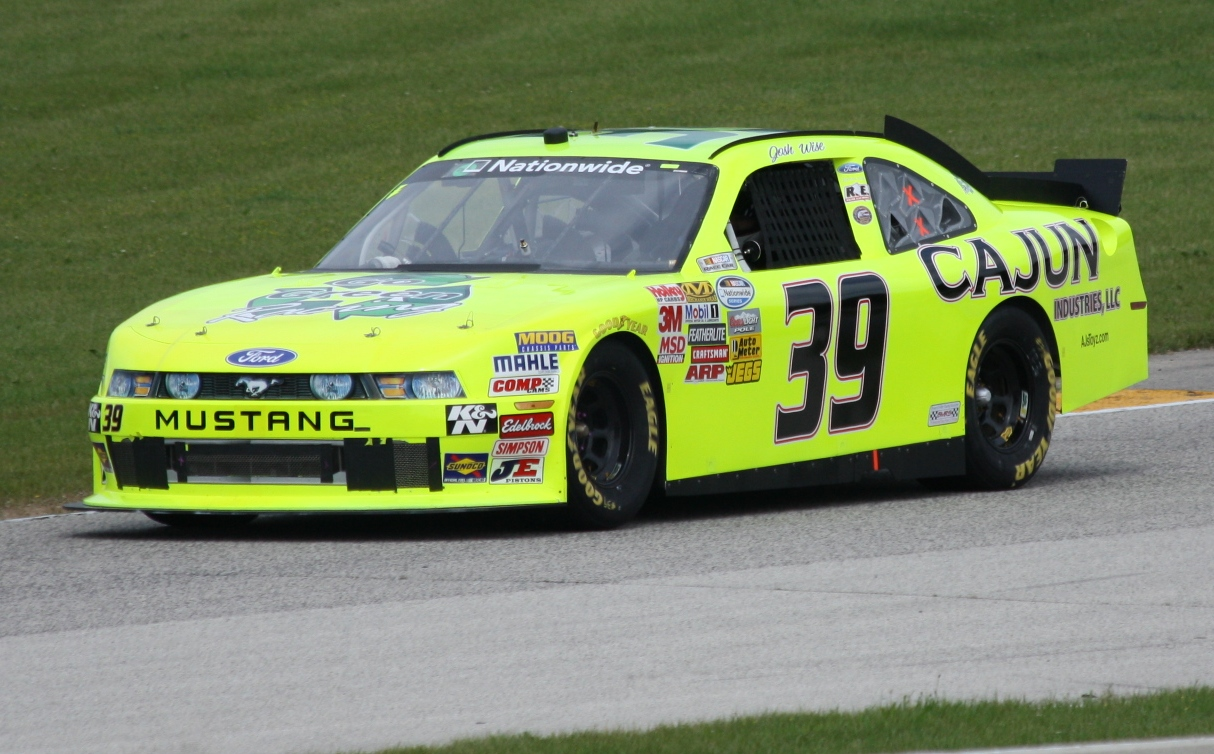
2011 Nationwide car at Road America

In 2011, Wise returned to JR Motorsports part-time and also drove for Go Green Racing and Key Motorsports. Wise raced part-time in 2011 bouncing between three different teams but still managed to finish sixteenth in the Nationwide Series drivers standings, He also made his Cup Series debut at Chicago, driving for Max Q Motorsports; he qualified for three additional races over the rest of the year. In 2012, Wise ran the majority of the Nationwide Series schedule for The Motorsports Group. He also competed full-time, except for the Daytona 500, in the Sprint Cup Series, competing for rookie of the year, driving the Front Row Motorsports No. 26.

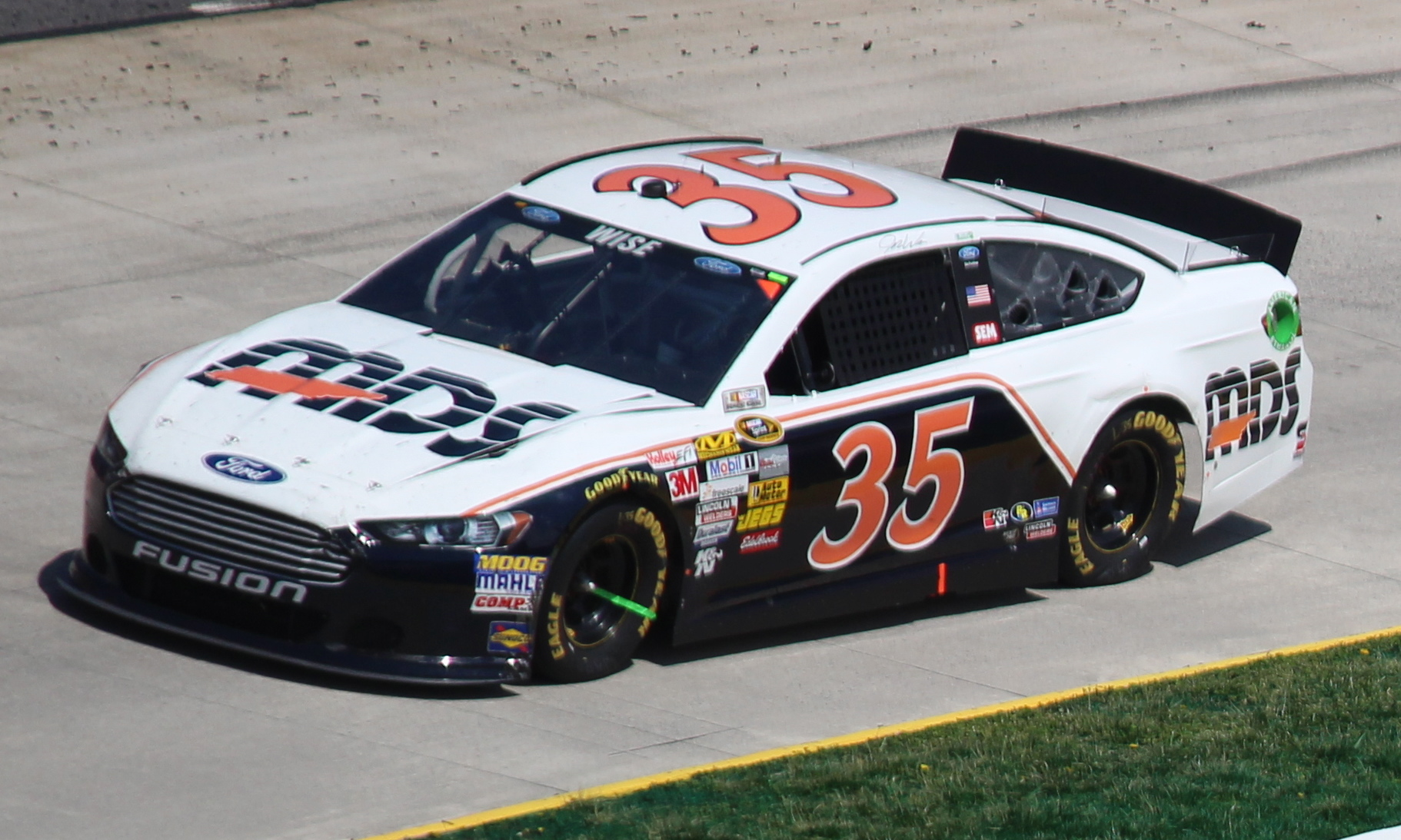
Wise competing in the 2013 STP Gas Booster 500

On November 26, 2013, Wise announced that he had left Front Row Motorsports; on December 4 it was revealed that he would drive for Phil Parsons Racing in the 2014 NASCAR Sprint Cup Series season.

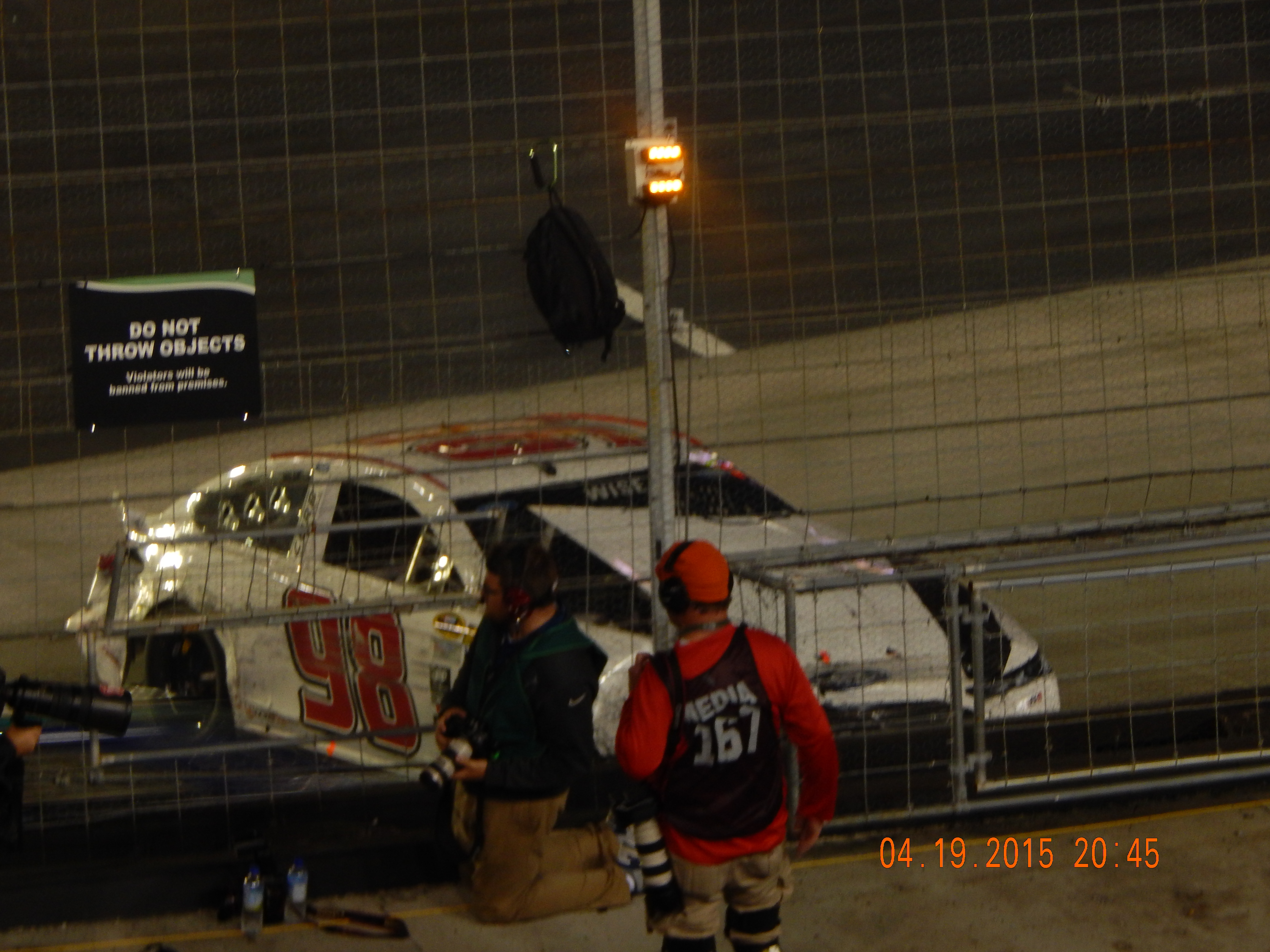
Wise's wrecked car at the 2015 Food City 500

In 2015, Wise received sponsorship for the Daytona 500 from former Phoenix Racing owner James Finch's company Phoenix Construction. However, he failed to qualify after suffering from a mechanical failure at the start of the second Budweiser Duel.

On April 29, rumors arose that PPR and Jay Robinson had agreed to a deal that would send Wise to Robinson's Premium Motorsports; this was officially announced by Premium Motorsports on May 4. Wise officially joined Premium Motorsports at the Coca-Cola 600 weekend. This partnership was short-lived, however, as Wise parted ways with the team after the 2015 Quaker State 400. On July 17, Wise announced he had joined Go FAS Racing in the No. 32 for the Brickyard 400; however, Wise failed to qualify. Wise returned to the No. 32 for a three-race stretch beginning at Michigan, where he was able to qualify and finish 37th and 35th, before failing to qualify for the Southern 500. Wise returned to Front Row Motorsports for the CampingWorld.com 500 at Talladega, driving the No. 34; he finished 29th in the event.

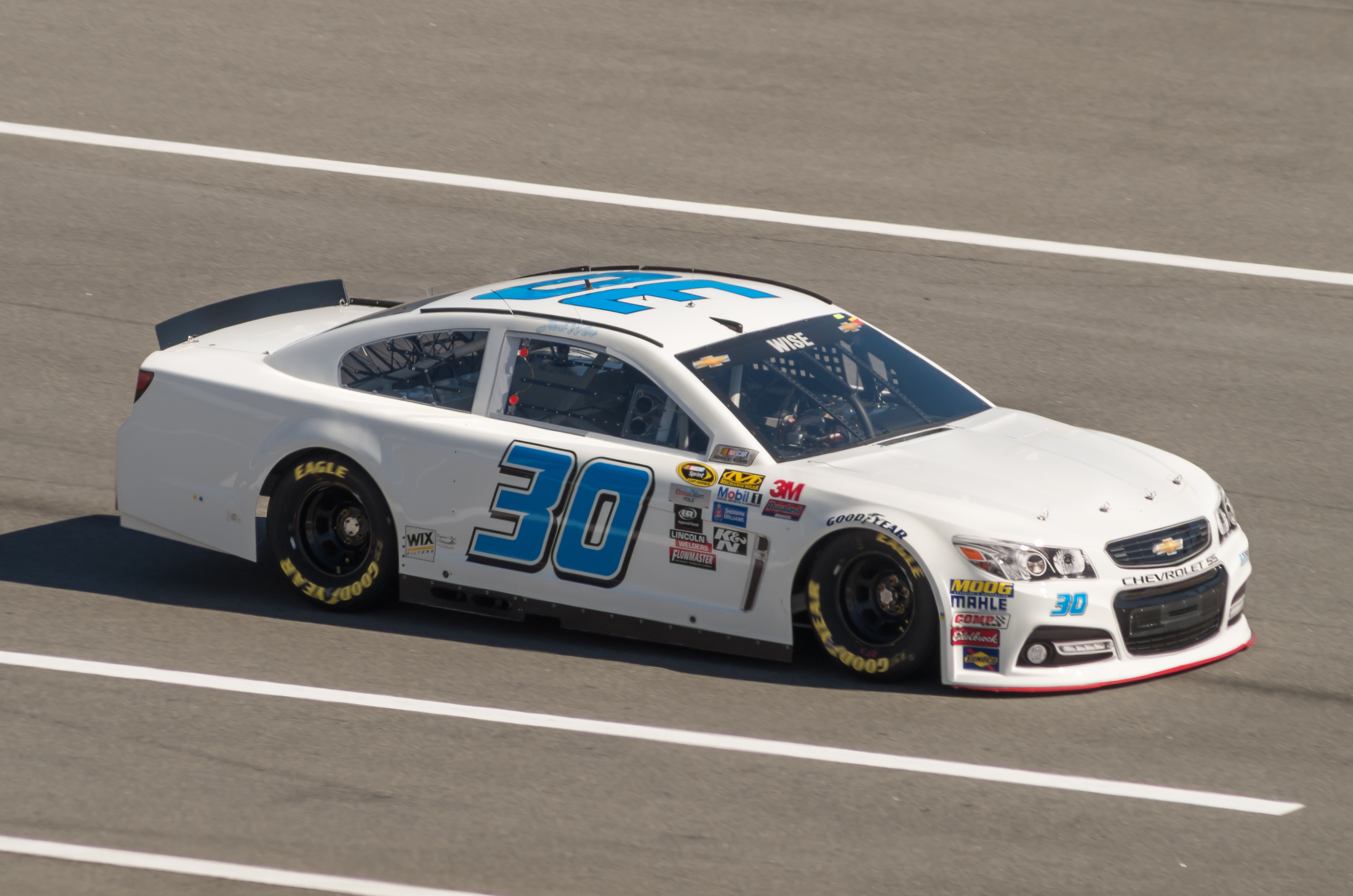
Wise's 2016 Cup car for The Motorsports Group

In 2016, Wise was picked up by The Motorsports Group for the Daytona 500; despite failing to qualify for the race, Wise and TMG announced their intention to run the full season together. Wise has also failed to qualify for the GEICO 500 at Talladega, the Brickyard 400, and the Coke Zero 400 at Daytona, but have otherwise qualified for every race in 2016. He didn't drive for Martinsville, Phoenix, and Homestead as Gray Gaulding drove for the team at those races.

=== Dogecoin sponsorship ===
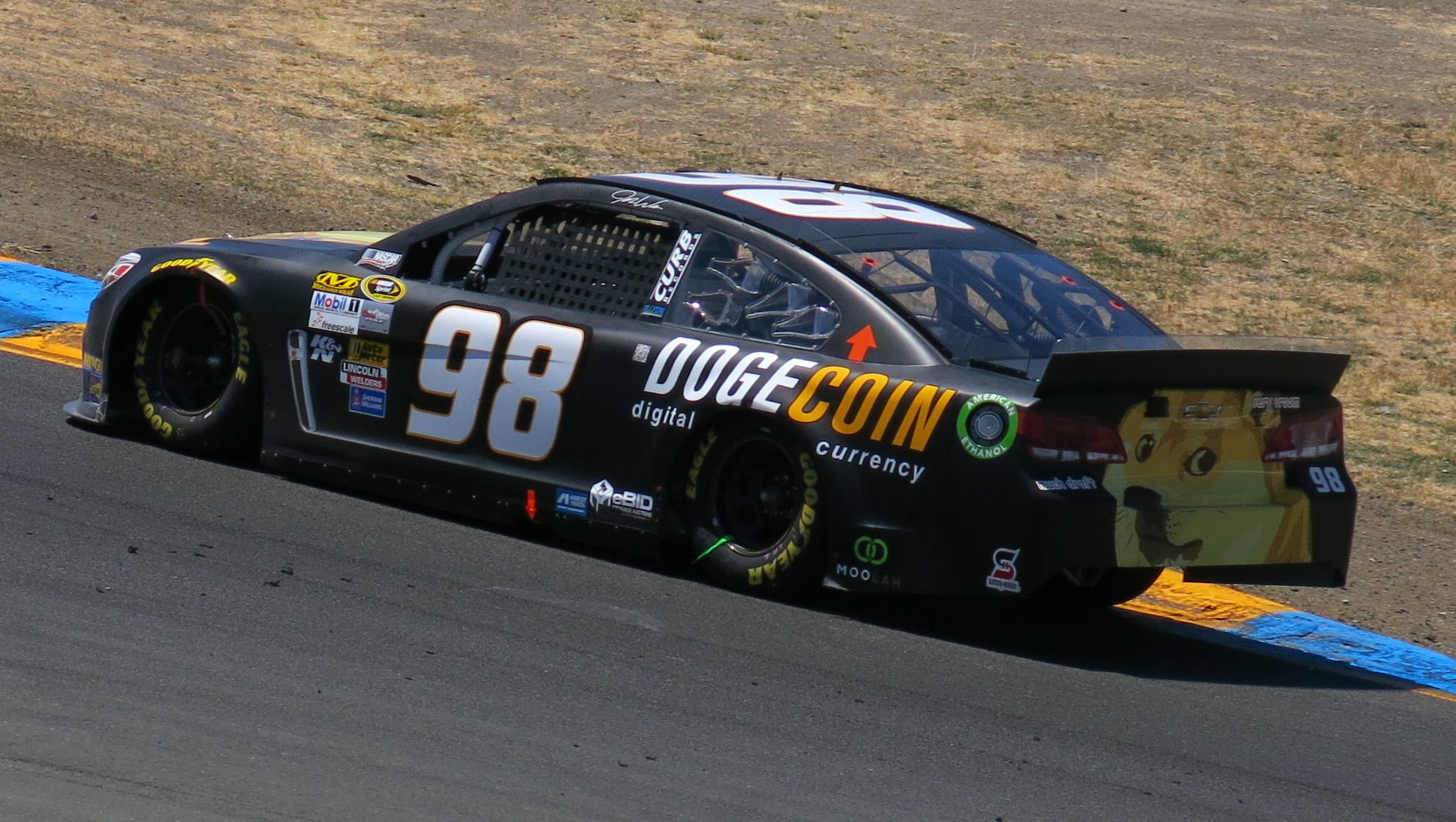
Wise's Dogecoin-sponsored Chevrolet in 2014

On March 16, 2014, users of a Reddit message board, /r/NASCAR, noticed Wise racing an unsponsored car at the Food City 500 and went with the idea of sponsoring a car. A user reached out to the Dogecoin community, a cryptocurrency based on the Internet meme, Doge, that had raised funds for other various causes. Phil Parsons Racing told /r/NASCAR the communities needed to raise $55,000 to sponsor Wise at the Aaron's 499.

Several days later Wise announced to his followers that he would race the Dogecar (also called the "Moonrocket") for free at the 2014 Sprint Showdown on May 16 and the 2014 All-Star Race if he won the Showdown or the fan vote. Wise did not advance through the Showdown but won the fan vote, defeating favorite Danica Patrick. Wise placed fifteenth in the exhibition All-Star Race.

In 2015, the Dogecar returned for the Toyota/Save Mart 350.

== Driver training ==
Wise no longer races in NASCAR and has declared himself to be retired. He eventually formed a driver performance consulting business, partnering with Chip Ganassi Racing in 2017 to train CGR drivers Brennan Poole, Tyler Reddick, Jamie McMurray and Kyle Larson. He currently serves as a driver performance manager for Chevrolet teams CGR, GMS Racing, and Hendrick Motorsports. Wise won the USAC Midget race at Lucas Oil Raceway on August 14, 2021 driving for Alex Bowman. The one-off start was his first series win since Angell Park Speedway in 2009.

== Personal life ==
Wise has two daughters. He is a triathlete, beginning after cycling with driver Scott Speed, and occasionally tests his bicycle at the A2 Wind Tunnel in North Carolina. Wise took to triathlon competitively and competed in a full 140.6 mile triathlon and four 70.3 mile Ironman triathlons. In 2015, Wise qualified for the Ironman 70.3 World Championships in Zell am See, Austria.

In 2014 Wise won a half marathon in Naples, FL.

== Motorsports career results ==
=== NASCAR ===
(key) (Bold – Pole position awarded by qualifying time. Italics – Pole position earned by points standings or practice time. * – Most laps led.)

==== Sprint Cup Series ====
NASCAR Sprint Cup Series results
| Year | Team | No. | Make | 1 | 2 | 3 | 4 | 5 | 6 | 7 | 8 | 9 | 10 | 11 | 12 | 13 | 14 | 15 | 16 | 17 | 18 | 19 | 20 | 21 | 22 | 23 | 24 | 25 | 26 | 27 | 28 | 29 | 30 | 31 | 32 | 33 | 34 | 35 | 36 | NSCC | Pts | Ref |
|---|---|---|---|---|---|---|---|---|---|---|---|---|---|---|---|---|---|---|---|---|---|---|---|---|---|---|---|---|---|---|---|---|---|---|---|---|---|---|---|---|---|---|
| 2009 | H&S Motorsports | 73 | Dodge | DAY | CAL | LVS | ATL | BRI | MAR | TEX | PHO | TAL | RCH | DAR | CLT | DOV | POC | MCH | SON | NHA | DAY | CHI | IND | POC | GLN | MCH | BRI | ATL | RCH | NHA | DOV | KAN | CAL | CLT | MAR; DNQ | TAL | TEX | PHO | HOM | NA | 0 | |
| 2010 | Gunselman Motorsports | 64 | Toyota | DAY | CAL | LVS | ATL | BRI | MAR | PHO | TEX | TAL | RCH | DAR | DOV | CLT | POC | MCH | SON | NHA | DAY | CHI | IND | POC | GLN | MCH | BRI | ATL | RCH | NHA | DOV; DNQ | KAN | CAL | CLT | MAR | TAL | | | | NA | 0 | |
| 2010 | R3 Motorsports | 23 | Toyota | | | | | | | | | | | | | | | | | | | | | | | | | | | | | | | | | | TEX; DNQ | PHO | HOM | NA | 0 | |
| 2011 | Max Q Motorsports | 37 | Ford | DAY | PHO | LVS | BRI | CAL | MAR | TEX | TAL | RCH | DAR | DOV | CLT | KAN | POC | MCH | SON | DAY | KEN | NHA | IND | POC | GLN | MCH | BRI | ATL | RCH | CHI; 42 | NHA; 39 | DOV; 37 | KAN; DNQ | CLT; DNQ | TAL; DNQ | MAR | | | | 74th | 0^{1} | |
| 2011 | HP Racing | 66 | Toyota | | | | | | | | | | | | | | | | | | | | | | | | | | | | | | | | | | TEX; 40 | PHO | HOM | 74th | 0^{1} | |
| 2012 | Front Row Motorsports | 26 | Ford | DAY | PHO; 38 | LVS; 40 | BRI; 43 | CAL; 37 | MAR; 41 | TEX; 39 | KAN; 39 | RCH; 38 | TAL; 42 | DAR; 43 | CLT; 43 | DOV; DNQ | POC; 42 | MCH; 42 | SON; 30 | KEN; 41 | DAY; 37 | NHA; 38 | IND; 37 | POC; 37 | GLN; 38 | MCH; 40 | BRI; 38 | ATL; DNQ | RCH; 42 | CHI; 38 | NHA; DNQ | DOV; 37 | TAL; 43 | CLT; DNQ | KAN; DNQ | MAR; 38 | TEX; 37 | PHO; 37 | HOM; 40 | 39th | 147 | |
| 2013 | Front Row Motorsports | 35 | Ford | DAY; 40 | PHO; 35 | LVS; 35 | BRI; 26 | CAL; 40 | MAR; 35 | TEX; 30 | KAN; 26 | RCH; 28 | TAL; 19 | DAR; 38 | CLT; 26 | DOV; 25 | POC; 34 | MCH; 40 | SON; 32 | KEN; 39 | DAY; 25 | NHA; 35 | IND; 38 | POC; 41 | GLN | MCH; 39 | BRI; 37 | ATL; 41 | RCH; 41 | CHI; 41 | NHA; 32 | DOV; 42 | KAN; 40 | CLT; 41 | TAL; 30 | MAR; 34 | TEX; 39 | PHO; 36 | HOM; 41 | 60th | 0^{1} | |
| 2014 | Phil Parsons Racing | 98 | Ford | DAY; 24 | | | | | | | | | TAL; 20 | | | | POC; 35 | | | | DAY; 23 | | | | | | | | | | | | | | TAL; 28 | | | | | 36th | 405 | |
| 2014 | Phil Parsons Racing | 98 | Chevy | | PHO; DNQ | LVS; 42 | BRI; 23 | CAL; 37 | MAR; 35 | TEX; 36 | DAR; 21 | RCH; 39 | | KAN; 33 | CLT; 41 | DOV; 28 | | MCH; 33 | SON; 40 | KEN; 29 | | NHA; 29 | IND; 29 | POC; 24 | GLN; 38 | MCH; 28 | BRI; 29 | ATL; 33 | RCH; 32 | CHI; 33 | NHA; 33 | DOV; 42 | KAN; 38 | CLT; 41 | | MAR; 25 | TEX; 41 | PHO; 41 | HOM; 32 | 36th | 405 | |
| 2015 | Phil Parsons Racing | 98 | Ford | DAY; DNQ | ATL; 32 | LVS; 34 | PHO; 36 | CAL; 36 | MAR; 30 | TEX; 38 | BRI; 39 | RCH; 42 | TAL; 10 | KAN; 28 | | | | | | | | | | | | | | | | | | | | | | | | | | 37th | 254 | |
| 2015 | Premium Motorsports | 98 | Ford | | | | | | | | | | | | CLT; 35 | DOV; 40 | POC; 29 | MCH; 34 | | DAY; 31 | KEN; 43 | NHA | | | | | | | | | | | | | | | | | | 37th | 254 | |
| 2015 | Premium Motorsports | 98 | Chevy | | | | | | | | | | | | | | | | SON; 28 | | | | | | | | | | | | | | | | | | | | | 37th | 254 | |
| 2015 | Go FAS Racing | 32 | Ford | | | | | | | | | | | | | | | | | | | | IND; DNQ | POC | GLN | MCH; 37 | BRI; 35 | DAR; DNQ | | CHI; 33 | | DOV; 36 | CLT; DNQ | KAN | | | | | HOM; 39 | 37th | 254 | |
| 2015 | The Motorsports Group | 30 | Chevy | | | | | | | | | | | | | | | | | | | | | | | | | | RCH; DNQ | | | | | | | | | | | 37th | 254 | |
| 2015 | BK Racing | 26 | Toyota | | | | | | | | | | | | | | | | | | | | | | | | | | | | NHA; 31 | | | | | | | | | 37th | 254 | |
| 2015 | Front Row Motorsports | 34 | Ford | | | | | | | | | | | | | | | | | | | | | | | | | | | | | | | | TAL; 29 | MAR | TEX | PHO | | 37th | 254 | |
| 2016 | The Motorsports Group | 30 | Chevy | DAY; DNQ | ATL; 39 | LVS; 35 | PHO; 34 | CAL; 36 | MAR; 38 | TEX; 40 | BRI; 33 | RCH; 39 | TAL; DNQ | KAN; 36 | DOV; 36 | CLT; 38 | POC; 27 | MCH; 30 | SON; 38 | DAY; DNQ | KEN; 24 | NHA; 40 | IND; DNQ | POC; 34 | GLN; 26 | BRI; 36 | MCH; 38 | DAR; 29 | RCH; 30 | CHI; 38 | NHA; 39 | DOV; 39 | CLT; 29 | KAN; 39 | TAL; Wth | MAR | TEX; 40 | PHO | HOM | 40th | 168 | |

==== Xfinity Series ====
NASCAR Xfinity Series results
| Year | Team | No. | Make | 1 | 2 | 3 | 4 | 5 | 6 | 7 | 8 | 9 | 10 | 11 | 12 | 13 | 14 | 15 | 16 | 17 | 18 | 19 | 20 | 21 | 22 | 23 | 24 | 25 | 26 | 27 | 28 | 29 | 30 | 31 | 32 | 33 | 34 | 35 | NXSC | Pts | Ref |
|---|---|---|---|---|---|---|---|---|---|---|---|---|---|---|---|---|---|---|---|---|---|---|---|---|---|---|---|---|---|---|---|---|---|---|---|---|---|---|---|---|---|
| 2007 | Fitz Motorsports | 22 | Dodge | DAY | CAL | MXC | LVS | ATL | BRI | NSH | TEX | PHO | TAL | RCH | DAR | CLT | DOV | NSH | KEN | MLW | NHA | DAY | CHI | GTY | IRP; 19 | CGV | GLN | MCH | BRI | CAL | RCH | DOV | KAN | CLT | MEM | TEX | PHO | HOM | 125th | 206 | |
| 2008 | Fitz Motorsports | 22 | Dodge | DAY | CAL | LVS | ATL | BRI | NSH | TEX | PHO | MXC | TAL | RCH | DAR | CLT; 24 | DOV; 19 | NSH; 33 | KEN; 23 | MLW; 33 | NHA; 20 | DAY; 33 | CHI; 25 | GTY; 16 | IRP; 5 | CGV | GLN | | | | | DOV; 13 | KAN | | | | | | 33rd | 1770 | |
| 2008 | Fitz Motorsports | 22 | Toyota | | | | | | | | | | | | | | | | | | | | | | | | | MCH; 14 | BRI | CAL; 22 | | | | | | | | | 33rd | 1770 | |
| 2008 | Michael Waltrip Racing | 00 | Toyota | | | | | | | | | | | | | | | | | | | | | | | | | | | | RCH; 35 | | | CLT; DNQ | | TEX; 11 | PHO; 23 | HOM; 12 | 33rd | 1770 | |
| 2008 | Michael Waltrip Racing | 99 | Toyota | | | | | | | | | | | | | | | | | | | | | | | | | | | | | | | | MEM; QL^{†} | | | | 33rd | 1770 | |
| 2009 | Curb Racing | 43 | Ford | DAY | CAL | LVS | BRI | TEX; DNQ | NSH | PHO | TAL | RCH | DAR | CLT | DOV | NSH | KEN | MLW | NHA | DAY | CHI | GTY | IRP | IOW | GLN | MCH | BRI | CGV | ATL | | | | | | | | | | 97th | 198 | |
| 2009 | SK Motorsports | 07 | Chevy | | | | | | | | | | | | | | | | | | | | | | | | | | | RCH; 37 | DOV | KAN | CAL | CLT | MEM | | | | 97th | 198 | |
| 2009 | Xxxtreme Motorsport | 58 | Chevy | | | | | | | | | | | | | | | | | | | | | | | | | | | | | | | | | TEX; 27 | PHO; 34 | HOM | 97th | 198 | |
| 2010 | Specialty Racing | 61 | Ford | DAY; 39 | CAL; 37 | LVS; 19 | BRI; 23 | NSH; 20 | PHO; 24 | TEX; DNQ | TAL; DNQ | RCH; 37 | DAR; 34 | DOV; 36 | CLT; 42 | | | ROA; 41 | NHA; 41 | DAY | | | | | | | | | | | | | | | | | | | 25th | 2161 | |
| 2010 | JR Motorsports | 7 | Chevy | | | | | | | | | | | | | NSH; 16 | KEN; 15 | | | | | GTY; 8 | IRP; 16 | IOW; 11 | GLN | | BRI; 15 | CGV | ATL; 11 | RCH | | KAN; 13 | CAL | | | | | | 25th | 2161 | |
| 2010 | Baker Curb Racing | 37 | Ford | | | | | | | | | | | | | | | | | | CHI; 40 | | | | | | | | | | | | | | | | | | 25th | 2161 | |
| 2010 | Baker Curb Racing | 27 | Ford | | | | | | | | | | | | | | | | | | | | | | | MCH; 40 | | | | | | | | | | | | | 25th | 2161 | |
| 2010 | Turner Motorsports | 10 | Toyota | | | | | | | | | | | | | | | | | | | | | | | | | | | | DOV; 39 | | | | | | | | 25th | 2161 | |
| 2010 | Baker Curb Racing | 43 | Dodge | | | | | | | | | | | | | | | | | | | | | | | | | | | | | | | CLT; 18 | | | | | 25th | 2161 | |
| 2010 | JR Motorsports | 88 | Chevy | | | | | | | | | | | | | | | | | | | | | | | | | | | | | | | | GTY; 7 | TEX | PHO | HOM | 25th | 2161 | |
| 2011 | Go Green Racing | 39 | Ford | DAY; 31 | PHO; 18 | LVS; 34 | BRI; 18 | | | TAL; 31 | | | | | | | CHI; 26 | | ROA; 13 | DAY; 24 | KEN | NHA | | | | | | | | | | | | | | | | | 16th | 671 | |
| 2011 | JR Motorsports | 7 | Chevy | | | | | CAL; 16 | TEX; 14 | | NSH; 9 | RCH; 6 | DAR; 14 | DOV; 17 | IOW; 29 | CLT; 17 | | MCH; 16 | | | | | NSH; 20 | IRP; 19 | IOW; 4 | | | BRI; 16 | | | | | | | CLT; 14 | | | | 16th | 671 | |
| 2011 | Key Motorsports | 40 | Chevy | | | | | | | | | | | | | | | | | | | | | | | GLN; 28 | CGV; 29 | | ATL; 22 | RCH; 33 | CHI; 31 | DOV; 33 | KAN; 33 | TEX; 36 | | | | | 16th | 671 | |
| 2011 | Key Motorsports | 42 | Chevy | | | | | | | | | | | | | | | | | | | | | | | | | | | | | | | | | PHO; DNQ | | | 16th | 671 | |
| 2011 | Key Motorsports | 47 | Chevy | | | | | | | | | | | | | | | | | | | | | | | | | | | | | | | | | | HOM; 39 | | 16th | 671 | |
| 2012 | The Motorsports Group | 40 | Chevy | DAY; 14 | | | | | | | | | | | | | | | | | | | | | | | | | | | | | | | | | | | 125th | 0^{1} | |
| 2012 | The Motorsports Group | 42 | Chevy | | PHO; 40 | LVS; 41 | BRI; 43 | CAL; 39 | TEX; 40 | RCH; 38 | TAL; 40 | DAR; 39 | IOW | CLT; 41 | DOV; 37 | MCH; 39 | ROA | KEN; 40 | DAY; 41 | NHA; 41 | CHI | IND; 42 | IOW | GLN; 39 | CGV | BRI; 40 | ATL; 40 | RCH; 40 | CHI; 41 | KEN | DOV; 39 | CLT; 41 | KAN; DNQ | TEX; 42 | PHO; 40 | HOM; 42 | | | 125th | 0^{1} | |
| 2013 | The Motorsports Group | 42 | Chevy | DAY | PHO; 38 | | | | | | | | | DOV; 38 | IOW | MCH; 37 | ROA | KEN; 38 | DAY | NHA; 38 | CHI | IND; 39 | IOW | GLN; 39 | MOH | BRI; 40 | ATL; 39 | RCH; 38 | CHI; DNQ | KEN | DOV; 38 | KAN; 39 | CLT; DNQ | TEX; 38 | PHO; 39 | HOM; 39 | | | 33rd | 217 | |
| 2013 | The Motorsports Group | 40 | Chevy | | | LVS; 25 | BRI; 19 | CAL; 20 | TEX; 37 | RCH; 34 | TAL; 18 | DAR; 21 | CLT | | | | | | | | | | | | | | | | | | | | | | | | | | 33rd | 217 | |
| 2014 | The Motorsports Group | 40 | Chevy | DAY; 36 | PHO; 26 | LVS; 37 | BRI; 30 | CAL; 33 | TEX; 31 | DAR; 15 | RCH; 25 | TAL; 26 | IOW | CLT; 28 | DOV; 33 | MCH; 26 | ROA | KEN; 29 | DAY; 32 | NHA; 38 | CHI | IND; 29 | IOW | | | | | | | | | | | | | | | | 103rd | 0^{1} | |
| 2014 | The Motorsports Group | 46 | Chevy | | | | | | | | | | | | | | | | | | | | | GLN; 39 | MOH | BRI | ATL | RCH | CHI | KEN | DOV | KAN | CLT | TEX | PHO | HOM | | | 103rd | 0^{1} | |
| 2016 | MBM Motorsports | 40 | Toyota | DAY | ATL | LVS | PHO | CAL; 39 | | | | | | | | | | | | | | | | | | | | | | | | | | | | | | | 124th | 0^{1} | |
| 2016 | RSS Racing | 93 | Chevy | | | | | | TEX; 40 | BRI; 39 | RCH; 40 | TAL | DOV | CLT; 39 | POC; 36 | MCH; 39 | IOW | DAY | KEN | NHA | IND | IOW | GLN | MOH | BRI | ROA | DAR | RCH | CHI | KEN | | | | | | | | | 124th | 0^{1} | |
| 2016 | B. J. McLeod Motorsports | 15 | Ford | | | | | | | | | | | | | | | | | | | | | | | | | | | | DOV; 39 | CLT | | | | | | | 124th | 0^{1} | |
| 2016 | TriStar Motorsports | 10 | Toyota | | | | | | | | | | | | | | | | | | | | | | | | | | | | | | KAN; DNQ | TEX | PHO | HOM | | | 124th | 0^{1} | |
^{†} - Qualified for David Reutimann

==== Camping World Truck Series ====
NASCAR Camping World Truck Series results
| Year | Team | No. | Make | 1 | 2 | 3 | 4 | 5 | 6 | 7 | 8 | 9 | 10 | 11 | 12 | 13 | 14 | 15 | 16 | 17 | 18 | 19 | 20 | 21 | 22 | 23 | 24 | 25 | NCWTC | Pts | Ref |
|---|---|---|---|---|---|---|---|---|---|---|---|---|---|---|---|---|---|---|---|---|---|---|---|---|---|---|---|---|---|---|---|
| 2007 | Darrell Waltrip Motorsports | 00 | Toyota | DAY | CAL | ATL | MAR | KAN; 17 | CLT | MFD | DOV | TEX; 13 | MCH | MLW; 29 | MEM | KEN; 21 | IRP | NSH; 19 | BRI | GTW; 8 | NHA | LVS; 6 | TAL; 23 | MAR | ATL; 35 | TEX | PHO | HOM | 33rd | 962 | |
| 2011 | RSS Racing | 93 | Chevy | DAY | PHO | DAR | MAR | NSH | DOV | CLT | KAN | TEX | KEN | IOW | NSH | IRP | POC | MCH | BRI | ATL | CHI | NHA; 29 | KEN | LVS | TAL | MAR | TEX | HOM | 100th | 0^{1} | |
| 2012 | Norm Benning Racing | 75 | Chevy | DAY | MAR | CAR | KAN | CLT | DOV | TEX | KEN | IOW | CHI | POC | MCH; 34 | BRI | ATL | IOW | KEN | LVS | TAL | MAR | TEX | PHO | HOM | | | | 103rd | 0^{1} | |
| 2016 | Premium Motorsports | 49 | Chevy | DAY | ATL | MAR | KAN | DOV | CLT | TEX | IOW | GTW | KEN | ELD | POC | BRI | MCH | MSP | CHI | NHA; 27 | LVS | TAL | MAR | TEX | PHO | HOM | | | 106th | 0^{1} | |

==== Busch East Series ====
NASCAR Busch East Series results
| Year | Team | No. | Make | 1 | 2 | 3 | 4 | 5 | 6 | 7 | 8 | 9 | 10 | 11 | 12 | 13 | NBES | Pts | Ref |
|---|---|---|---|---|---|---|---|---|---|---|---|---|---|---|---|---|---|---|---|
| 2007 | Fitz Motorsports | 2 | Dodge | GRE | ELK | IOW | SBO | STA | NHA; 12 | TMP | MCM | ADI | LRP | MFD | NHA | DOV | 61st | 127 | |

=== ARCA Re/Max Series ===
(key) (Bold – Pole position awarded by qualifying time. Italics – Pole position earned by points standings or practice time. * – Most laps led.)

ARCA Re/Max Series results
| Year | Team | No. | Make | 1 | 2 | 3 | 4 | 5 | 6 | 7 | 8 | 9 | 10 | 11 | 12 | 13 | 14 | 15 | 16 | 17 | 18 | 19 | 20 | 21 | 22 | 23 | ARSC | Pts | Ref |
|---|---|---|---|---|---|---|---|---|---|---|---|---|---|---|---|---|---|---|---|---|---|---|---|---|---|---|---|---|---|
| 2006 | Eddie Sharp Racing | 22 | Dodge | DAY | NSH | SLM | WIN; 31 | KEN | TOL | POC | MCH | KAN | KEN | BLN | POC | GTW | NSH | MCH | ISF | MIL | TOL; 8 | DSF | CHI | SLM | TAL | IOW | 94th | 265 | |
| 2007 | Eddie Sharp Racing | 22 | Toyota | DAY; 36 | USA | | | KAN; 5 | | | | | POC; 9 | MCH | BLN | KEN; 34 | POC | NSH; 2 | | | **GTW**; 2 | | CHI; 35 | SLM | TAL; 33 | TOL | 26th | 1640 | |
| 2007 | Eddie Sharp Racing | 22 | Dodge | | | NSH; 23 | SLM | | WIN; 7 | KEN | TOL | IOW | | | | | | | ISF; 40 | MIL | | DSF; 2 | | | | | 26th | 1640 | |

^{*} Season still in progress
^{1} Ineligible for series points
