= 2016 AAA Texas 500 =

Race details
- Race 34 of 36 in the 2016 NASCAR Sprint Cup Series
- Date: November 6, 2016
- Location: Texas Motor Speedway in Fort Worth, Texas
- Course: Permanent racing facility
- Course length: 1.5 miles (2.414 km)
- Distance: 293 laps, 439.5 mi (707.307 km)
- Scheduled distance: 334 laps, 501 mi (806.281 km)
- Average speed: 134.541 miles per hour (216.523 km/h)

Pole position
Driver	Austin Dillon	Richard Childress Racing
- Time: 28.081

Most laps led
Driver	Joey Logano	Team Penske
- Laps: 178

Winner
No. 19	Carl Edwards	Joe Gibbs Racing

Television in the United States
- Network: NBCSN
- Announcers: Rick Allen, Jeff Burton and Steve Letarte

Radio in the United States
- Radio: PRN
- Booth announcers: Doug Rice, Mark Garrow and Wendy Venturini
- Turn announcers: Rob Albright (1 & 2) and Pat Patterson (3 & 4)

The 2016 AAA Texas 500 was a NASCAR Sprint Cup Series race held on November 6, 2016, at Texas Motor Speedway in Fort Worth, Texas. Contested over 293 laps on the 1.5-mile (2.4-kilometre) intermediate quad-oval, it was the 34th race of the 2016 NASCAR Sprint Cup Series season, eighth race of the Chase and second race of the Round of 8. Shortened from 334 laps due to rain, the race was won by Carl Edwards for Joe Gibbs Racing, taking his 28th Cup Series victory.

== Entry list ==
No.	Driver	Team	Manufacturer
1	Jamie McMurray	Chip Ganassi Racing	Chevrolet
2	Brad Keselowski	Team Penske	Ford
3	Austin Dillon	Richard Childress Racing	Chevrolet
4	Kevin Harvick	Stewart–Haas Racing	Chevrolet
5	Kasey Kahne	Hendrick Motorsports	Chevrolet
6	Trevor Bayne	Roush Fenway Racing	Ford
7	Regan Smith	Tommy Baldwin Racing	Chevrolet
10	Danica Patrick	Stewart–Haas Racing	Chevrolet
11	Denny Hamlin	Joe Gibbs Racing	Toyota
13	Casey Mears	Germain Racing	Chevrolet
14	Tony Stewart	Stewart–Haas Racing	Chevrolet
15	Clint Bowyer	HScott Motorsports	Chevrolet
16	Greg Biffle	Roush Fenway Racing	Ford
17	Ricky Stenhouse Jr.	Roush Fenway Racing	Ford
18	Kyle Busch	Joe Gibbs Racing	Toyota
19	Carl Edwards	Joe Gibbs Racing	Toyota
20	Matt Kenseth	Joe Gibbs Racing	Toyota
21	Ryan Blaney (R)	Wood Brothers Racing	Ford
22	Joey Logano	Team Penske	Ford
23	David Ragan	BK Racing	Toyota
24	Chase Elliott (R)	Hendrick Motorsports	Chevrolet
27	Paul Menard	Richard Childress Racing	Chevrolet
30	Josh Wise	The Motorsports Group	Chevrolet
31	Ryan Newman	Richard Childress Racing	Chevrolet
32	Joey Gase (i)	Go FAS Racing	Ford
34	Chris Buescher (R)	Front Row Motorsports	Ford
38	Landon Cassill	Front Row Motorsports	Ford
41	Kurt Busch	Stewart–Haas Racing	Chevrolet
42	Kyle Larson	Chip Ganassi Racing	Chevrolet
43	Aric Almirola	Richard Petty Motorsports	Ford
44	Brian Scott (R)	Richard Petty Motorsports	Ford
46	Michael Annett	HScott Motorsports	Chevrolet
47	A. J. Allmendinger	JTG Daugherty Racing	Chevrolet
48	Jimmie Johnson	Hendrick Motorsports	Chevrolet
55	Reed Sorenson	Premium Motorsports	Toyota
78	Martin Truex Jr.	Furniture Row Racing	Toyota
83	Matt DiBenedetto	BK Racing	Toyota
88	Alex Bowman (i)	Hendrick Motorsports	Chevrolet
93	Ryan Ellis (i)	BK Racing	Toyota
95	Michael McDowell	Circle Sport – Leavine Family Racing	Chevrolet
Official entry list

== First practice ==
Kevin Harvick was the fastest in the first practice session with a time of 27.455 and a speed of 196.685 mph (316.534 km/h). Kyle Busch went to a backup car after hitting the wall exiting turn 4 on his first lap in practice. He said afterwards that he "got into Turn 3 and the car felt good. It loaded really well, but we got back into the throttle and got to the bumps and it bottomed me out a little bit. It got me up the track. From there the whole car just kind of came off the track. I couldn't get it checked up or slowed down in time before it slapped the wall. Speeds are really high here at Texas and when you lose that grip, it happens in a hurry and it got away from me. I wish I would have taken it a little easier but I wasn't even trying that hard to be honest so it was a shock that it happened."

Pos	No.	Driver	Team	Manufacturer	Time	Speed
1	4	Kevin Harvick	Stewart–Haas Racing	Chevrolet	27.455	196.685
2	19	Carl Edwards	Joe Gibbs Racing	Toyota	27.512	196.278
3	20	Matt Kenseth	Joe Gibbs Racing	Toyota	27.561	195.929
Official first practice results

=== Second practice ===
Ryan Blaney was the fastest in the second practice session with a time of 28.645 and a speed of 188.515 mph (303.385 km/h).

Pos	No.	Driver	Team	Manufacturer	Time	Speed
1	21	Ryan Blaney (R)	Wood Brothers Racing	Ford	28.645	188.515
2	47	A. J. Allmendinger	JTG Daugherty Racing	Chevrolet	28.646	188.508
3	17	Ricky Stenhouse Jr.	Roush Fenway Racing	Ford	28.747	187.846
Official second practice results

=== Final practice ===
Brad Keselowski was the fastest in the final practice session with a time of 28.319 and a speed of 190.685 mph (306.878 km/h).

Pos	No.	Driver	Team	Manufacturer	Time	Speed
1	2	Brad Keselowski	Team Penske	Ford	28.319	190.685
2	78	Martin Truex Jr.	Furniture Row Racing	Toyota	28.453	189.787
3	18	Kyle Busch	Joe Gibbs Racing	Toyota	28.458	189.753
Official final practice results

== Qualifying ==
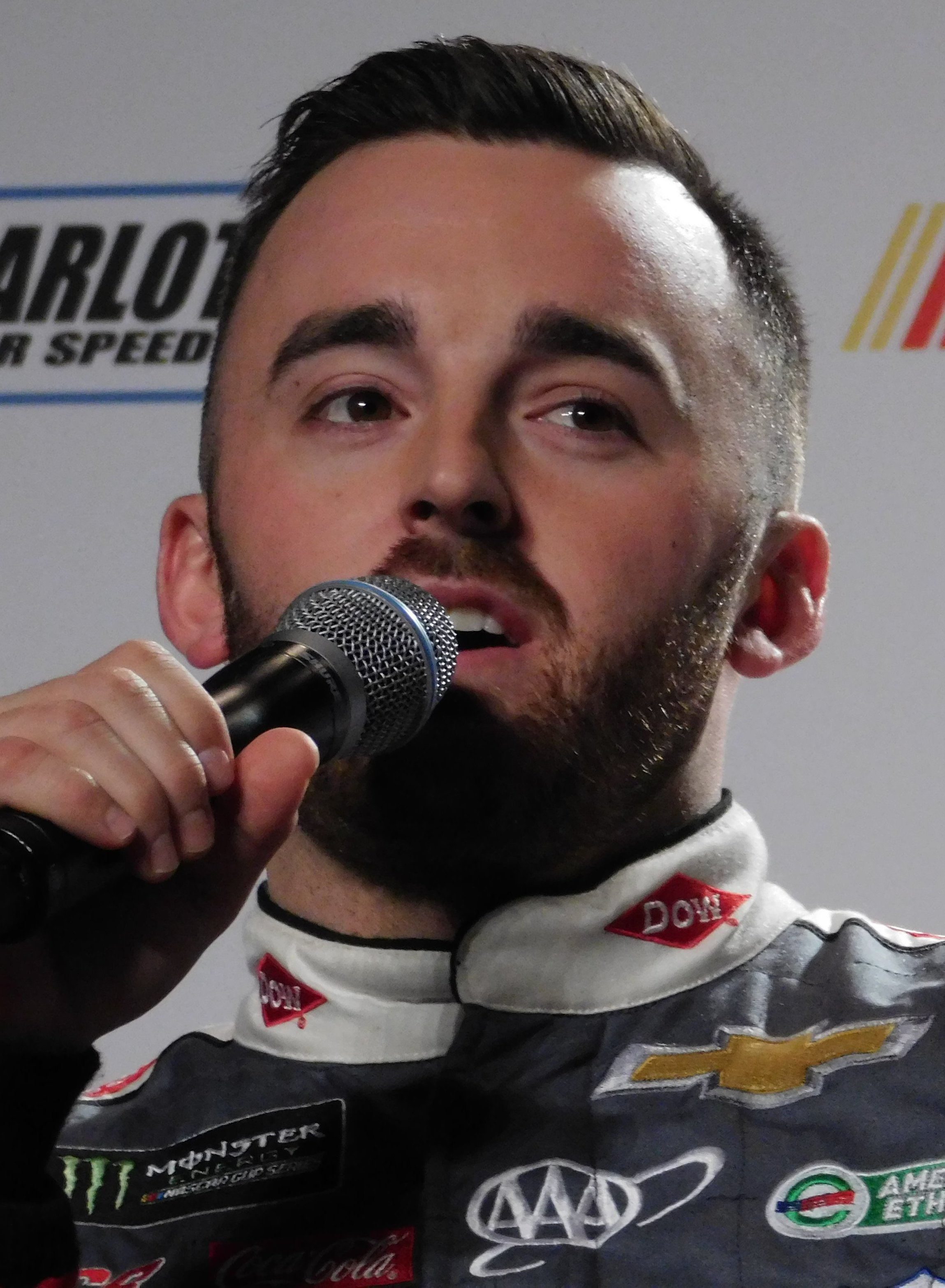
Austin Dillon scored the pole position.

Austin Dillon scored the pole for the race with a time of 28.081 and a speed of 192.301 mph (309.478 km/h). He said afterwards that he couldn't "be happier for RCR and everybody back at the shop. A lot of hard work and effort goes on. We missed the Chase by just two feet. We want to prove that we can win a race by the end of this year. This is big for us. I thought I messed up the lap, truthfully. I got a lot of good speed off of (Turn) 2, but Turn 3 I turned in and missed my corner, but it worked out. Proud of these guys and everybody back home."

Joey Logano, who qualified second, said he "didn’t think it would be anywhere close to the pole" after he "got done with that last run," and that he "didn’t have a very good run in (turn) 2 at all; I missed the bottom. And then realizing how close you were to the pole afterward is the most frustrating part of it, especially after last week.

Kyle Busch's crew chief Adam Stevens, who took the No. 18 car to the garage for a water leak after advancing into the second round, said he thought the leak was "a byproduct of pounding the fence before we even completed a lap in practice. In our hurry to change the motor and all the drivetrain afterwards, apparently we didn't get the lower radiator hose completely clamped on the water neck out of the block and proceeded to dump all the water out of it on pit road after our first run. We’re going to start 24th and get after them from there.”

After a crash during Saturday's Xfinity Series race, Matt DiBenedetto entered concussion protocol and was not cleared to run the Sprint Cup race. His substitute in the No. 83 was Jeffrey Earnhardt.

Chase Elliott experienced flu-like symptoms during the weekend. Justin Allgaier was named as his standby.

=== Qualifying results ===
Pos	No.	Driver	Team	Manufacturer	R1	R2	R3
1	3	Austin Dillon	Richard Childress Racing	Chevrolet	27.960	27.979	28.081
2	22	Joey Logano	Team Penske	Ford	27.797	27.982	28.087
3	4	Kevin Harvick	Stewart–Haas Racing	Chevrolet	27.855	27.826	28.099
4	2	Brad Keselowski	Team Penske	Ford	28.095	28.231	28.106
5	42	Kyle Larson	Chip Ganassi Racing	Chevrolet	27.952	28.237	28.131
6	27	Paul Menard	Richard Childress Racing	Chevrolet	28.007	28.020	28.195
7	20	Matt Kenseth	Joe Gibbs Racing	Toyota	28.062	28.208	28.216
8	21	Ryan Blaney (R)	Wood Brothers Racing	Ford	28.027	28.202	28.232
9	19	Carl Edwards	Joe Gibbs Racing	Toyota	27.977	27.844	28.274
10	41	Kurt Busch	Stewart–Haas Racing	Chevrolet	27.981	28.173	28.340
11	24	Chase Elliott (R)	Hendrick Motorsports	Chevrolet	27.863	28.093	28.357
12	78	Martin Truex Jr.	Furniture Row Racing	Toyota	27.941	28.163	28.487
13	13	Casey Mears	Germain Racing	Chevrolet	28.118	28.238	
14	47	A. J. Allmendinger	JTG Daugherty Racing	Chevrolet	28.055	28.244	
15	1	Jamie McMurray	Chip Ganassi Racing	Chevrolet	28.138	28.265	
16	88	Alex Bowman (i)	Hendrick Motorsports	Chevrolet	28.132	28.288	
17	11	Denny Hamlin	Joe Gibbs Racing	Toyota	27.957	28.298	
18	31	Ryan Newman	Richard Childress Racing	Chevrolet	28.012	28.335	
19	48	Jimmie Johnson	Hendrick Motorsports	Chevrolet	28.071	28.493	
20	17	Ricky Stenhouse Jr.	Roush Fenway Racing	Ford	28.243	28.542	
21	43	Aric Almirola	Richard Petty Motorsports	Ford	28.121	28.623	
22	10	Danica Patrick	Stewart–Haas Racing	Chevrolet	28.134	28.742	
23	14	Tony Stewart	Stewart–Haas Racing	Chevrolet	28.090	281.286	
24	18	Kyle Busch	Joe Gibbs Racing	Toyota	27.827	0.000	
25	16	Greg Biffle	Roush Fenway Racing	Ford	28.251		
26	6	Trevor Bayne	Roush Fenway Racing	Ford	28.308		
27	15	Clint Bowyer	HScott Motorsports	Chevrolet	28.312		
28	95	Michael McDowell	Circle Sport – Leavine Family Racing	Chevrolet	28.343		
29	44	Brian Scott (R)	Richard Petty Motorsports	Ford	28.372		
30	34	Chris Buescher (R)	Front Row Motorsports	Ford	28.374		
31	5	Kasey Kahne	Hendrick Motorsports	Chevrolet	28.389		
32	7	Regan Smith	Tommy Baldwin Racing	Chevrolet	28.435		
33	83	Matt DiBenedetto	BK Racing	Toyota	28.436		
34	38	Landon Cassill	Front Row Motorsports	Ford	28.561		
35	93	Ryan Ellis (i)	BK Racing	Toyota	28.648		
36	23	David Ragan	BK Racing	Toyota	28.778		
37	46	Michael Annett	HScott Motorsports	Chevrolet	28.903		
38	55	Reed Sorenson	Premium Motorsports	Chevrolet	29.316		
39	32	Joey Gase (i)	Go FAS Racing	Ford	29.660		
40	30	Josh Wise	The Motorsports Group	Chevrolet	29.877		
Official qualifying results

== Race ==
=== First half ===
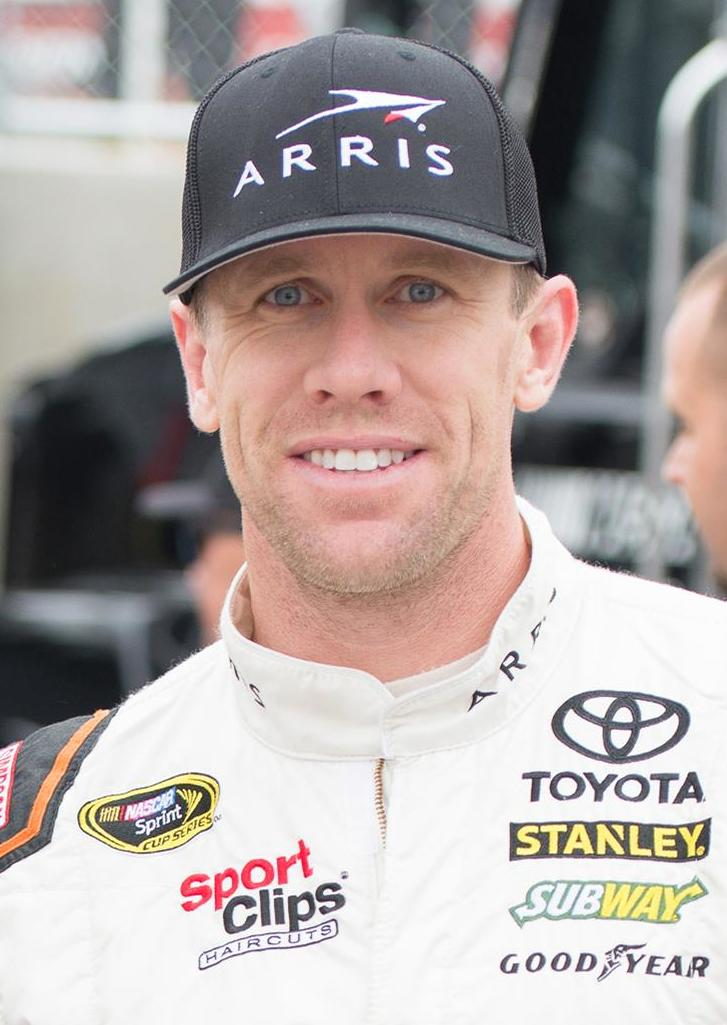
Carl Edwards won the race.

The start of the race was delayed for nearly six hours due to rain. The aged surface compounded the drying time. Austin Dillon led the field to the green flag at 7:56 p.m. under yellow flag conditions as the track surface was still not completely dry. The race went green at lap 7. Dillon was no match for Joey Logano who beat him on the restart to take the lead. The second caution of the race flew on lap 29. It was a scheduled competition caution.

The race restarted on lap 34. Green flag stops started on lap 73. Logano pitted from the lead on lap 76 and handed it to Dillon. He pitted the next lap and gave the lead to Denny Hamlin. He pitted the next lap and handed the lead to Kyle Busch who pitted the same lap on the next trip by, and the lead cycled back to Logano.

The third caution flew on lap 109 for Brian Scott spinning out in turn 4.

The race restarted on lap 116. Debris on the backstretch, a piece of hose, brought out the fourth caution on lap 117. The piece of debris punched a hole through the front bumper of Busch's car.

The race restarted on lap 121. The fifth caution flew on lap 143 for Paul Menard spinning in turn 3. Adding to his drama, a tire appeared to "explode" in his stall when it was something related to the inner liner. “When a car spins it generally flat spots the tires, which is exactly what happened here,” said Greg Stucker, Goodyear's director of race tire sales. “It flat spotted both front (tires). The damage that was done to the left front as he drove around the race track looked like it partially unseated the inner liner. So it was actually the inner liner that let go on pit road. It wasn't the tire itself. The tire was already down.”

=== Second half ===
The race restarted on lap 149. Green flag stops commenced on lap 188. Logano pitted on lap 189 and the lead cycled to Martin Truex Jr.

He and Edwards were fighting for the lead when both decided to pit on lap 224 and Chase Elliott took over the lead. He pitted the following lap and the lead cycled back to Truex.

The sixth caution flew with 80 laps to go for David Ragan turning Dillon in turn 3. Edwards exited pit road first.

The race restarted with 74 to go. A three-car wreck on the frontstretch involving Dillon, Casey Mears and Scott brought out the seventh caution with 72 to go. Dillon said afterwards that Harvick "sucked down on my door tighter than anybody had all night. He knew how tight he was at my door, that’s why I slid up in front of him. He didn’t check (up). He had the opportunity to. He didn’t like it that the silver spoon kid was outrunning him tonight, so we’ll be alright. We’ve got two weeks left. We just want to come out and win a race.” Harvick said after the race that "there was no intent there. I like racing with Austin. I like everything that they do. There was no reason [to hit him]. I was running seventh [or] sixth. He slid up and got loose and I hit the back of him."

The race restarted with 64 to go. Rain brought out the eighth caution with 45 to go. The race was red-flagged with 41 to go, declared official a few minutes later and Edwards was declared the winner. It would end up being the final win of his career, before he abruptly retired following the season.

== Post-race ==
=== Driver comments ===
Edwards said in victory lane that he "actually enjoyed [the race]. Obviously this is what we had to do. The guys got me off pit road first and that's what won it for me. We've got a shot at the championship at Homestead and that's all we wanted."

Logano, who led a race high of 178 laps, said to come "that close to winning and [leading] the most laps, second stings. That's our goal every week, is to win. Anything short of that is a failure. I feel like we were so close to that today. But ultimately, we did gain some points. We're in right now. We were out going into this race. So, you know, we did the best we could as far as leading laps and getting that bonus point, or those two bonus points with the most laps led as well. But we didn't get the win part. That would have been nice."

== Race results ==
Pos	No.	Driver	Team	Manufacturer	Laps	Points
1	19	Carl Edwards	Joe Gibbs Racing	Toyota	293	44
2	22	Joey Logano	Team Penske	Ford	293	41
3	78	Martin Truex Jr.	Furniture Row Racing	Toyota	293	39
4	24	Chase Elliott (R)	Hendrick Motorsports	Chevrolet	293	38
5	18	Kyle Busch	Joe Gibbs Racing	Toyota	293	37
6	4	Kevin Harvick	Stewart–Haas Racing	Chevrolet	293	35
7	20	Matt Kenseth	Joe Gibbs Racing	Toyota	293	34
8	5	Kasey Kahne	Hendrick Motorsports	Chevrolet	293	33
9	11	Denny Hamlin	Joe Gibbs Racing	Toyota	293	33
10	31	Ryan Newman	Richard Childress Racing	Chevrolet	293	31
11	48	Jimmie Johnson	Hendrick Motorsports	Chevrolet	293	30
12	21	Ryan Blaney (R)	Wood Brothers Racing	Ford	293	29
13	88	Alex Bowman (i)	Hendrick Motorsports	Chevrolet	293	0
14	2	Brad Keselowski	Team Penske	Ford	293	27
15	42	Kyle Larson	Chip Ganassi Racing	Chevrolet	293	26
16	17	Ricky Stenhouse Jr.	Roush Fenway Racing	Ford	293	25
17	47	A. J. Allmendinger	JTG Daugherty Racing	Chevrolet	293	24
18	16	Greg Biffle	Roush Fenway Racing	Ford	292	23
19	1	Jamie McMurray	Chip Ganassi Racing	Chevrolet	292	22
20	41	Kurt Busch	Stewart–Haas Racing	Chevrolet	292	21
21	34	Chris Buescher (R)	Front Row Motorsports	Ford	292	20
22	43	Aric Almirola	Richard Petty Motorsports	Ford	292	19
23	95	Michael McDowell	Circle Sport – Leavine Family Racing	Chevrolet	291	18
24	10	Danica Patrick	Stewart–Haas Racing	Chevrolet	291	17
25	15	Clint Bowyer	HScott Motorsports	Chevrolet	291	16
26	7	Regan Smith	Tommy Baldwin Racing	Chevrolet	291	15
27	44	Brian Scott (R)	Richard Petty Motorsports	Ford	291	14
28	27	Paul Menard	Richard Childress Racing	Chevrolet	290	13
29	38	Landon Cassill	Front Row Motorsports	Ford	290	12
30	6	Trevor Bayne	Roush Fenway Racing	Ford	289	11
31	14	Tony Stewart	Stewart–Haas Racing	Chevrolet	288	10
32	46	Michael Annett	HScott Motorsports	Chevrolet	287	9
33	23	David Ragan	BK Racing	Toyota	287	8
34	83	Jeffrey Earnhardt (R)	BK Racing	Toyota	285	7
35	55	Reed Sorenson	Premium Motorsports	Chevrolet	285	6
36	32	Joey Gase (i)	Go FAS Racing	Ford	280	0
37	3	Austin Dillon	Richard Childress Racing	Chevrolet	262	5
38	93	Ryan Ellis (i)	BK Racing	Toyota	261	0
39	13	Casey Mears	Germain Racing	Chevrolet	260	2
40	30	Josh Wise	The Motorsports Group	Chevrolet	257	1
Official race results

=== Race summary ===
- Lead changes: 12 among 8 different drivers
- Cautions/Laps: 8 for 37 laps
- Red flags: 1
- Time of race: 3 hours, 16 minutes and 0 seconds
- Average speed: 134.541 miles per hour (216.523 km/h)

== Media ==
=== Television ===
NBCSN covered the race on the television side. Rick Allen, two-time Texas winner Jeff Burton and Steve Letarte called the race from the broadcast booth, while Dave Burns, Mike Massaro, Marty Snider and Kelli Stavast handled pit road.

NBCSN
Booth announcers	Pit reporters
Lap-by-lap: Rick Allen; Color commentator: Jeff Burton; Color commentator: Steve Letarte	Dave Burns; Mike Massaro; Marty Snider; Kelli Stavast

=== Radio ===
PRN had the radio call for the race, which was simulcast on SiriusXM NASCAR Radio.

PRN
Booth announcers	Turn announcers	Pit reporters
Lead announcer: Doug Rice; Announcer: Mark Garrow; Announcer: Wendy Venturini	Turns 1 & 2: Rob Albright; Turns 3 & 4: Pat Patterson	Brad Gillie; Brett McMillan; Jim Noble; Steve Richards

== Standings after the race ==
Drivers' Championship standings

	Pos	Driver	Points
	1	Jimmie Johnson	4,074
3	2	Joey Logano	4,074 (–0)
1	3	Kyle Busch	4,074 (–0)
1	4	Matt Kenseth	4,073 (–1)
3	5	Denny Hamlin	4,072 (–2)
	6	Kevin Harvick	4,056 (–18)
1	7	Carl Edwards	4,049 (–25)
2	8	Kurt Busch	4,040 (–34)
	9	Martin Truex Jr.	2,265 (–1,809)
	10	Brad Keselowski	2,234 (–1,840)
1	11	Chase Elliott	2,223 (–1,851)
1	12	Kyle Larson	2,209 (–1,865)
2	13	Austin Dillon	2,192 (–1,882)
	14	Tony Stewart	2,166 (–1,908)
	15	Jamie McMurray	2,165 (–1,909)
	16	Chris Buescher	2,143 (–1,931)
Official driver's standings

Manufacturers' Championship standings

Pos	Manufacturer	Points
1	Toyota	1,403
2	Chevrolet	1,374 (–29)
3	Ford	1,307 (–96)
Official manufacturers' standings

- Note: Only the first 16 positions are included for the driver standings.

Previous race: 2016 Goody's Fast Relief 500	Sprint Cup Series; 2016 season	Next race: 2016 Can-Am 500
