= 2014 Bank of America 500 =

Race details
- Race 31 of 36 in the 2014 NASCAR Sprint Cup Series
- Date: October 11, 2014
- Location: Charlotte Motor Speedway, Concord, North Carolina
- Course: Permanent racing facility
- Course length: 1.5 miles (2.4 km)
- Distance: 334 laps, 501 mi (806.281 km)
- Weather: Mostly cloudy with a temperature of 72 °F (22 °C); wind out of the east at 3 miles per hour (4.8 km/h)
- Average speed: 145.346 mph (233.912 km/h)

Pole position
Driver	Kyle Busch	Joe Gibbs Racing
- Time: 27.357

Most laps led
Driver	Kevin Harvick	Stewart–Haas Racing
- Laps: 146

Winner
No. 4	Kevin Harvick	Stewart–Haas Racing

Television in the United States
- Network: ESPN3/ABC & PRN
- Announcers: Allen Bestwick, Dale Jarrett and Andy Petree (Television); Doug Rice and Mark Garrow (Booth); Rob Albright (1 & 2) and Brad Gillie (3 & 4) (Turns) (Radio)
- Nielsen ratings: 3.1/7 (Final); 2.9/7 (Overnight); 5.096 Million viewers

The 2014 Bank of America 500 was a NASCAR Sprint Cup Series stock car race that was held on October 11, 2014, at Charlotte Motor Speedway in Concord, North Carolina. Contested over 334 laps on the 1.5-mile (2.4 km) asphalt quad-oval, it was the 31st race of the 2014 Sprint Cup Series season, as well as the fifth race of ten in the Chase for the Sprint Cup. It was also ABC's final NASCAR telecast for the foreseeable future. Kevin Harvick scored his third win of the season and first since Darlington in April. Jeff Gordon finished second for the sixth time this season. Jamie McMurray, Joey Logano, and Kyle Busch rounded out the top five. The top rookies of the race were Kyle Larson (6th), Austin Dillon (13th), and Justin Allgaier (15th).

== Report ==
=== Background ===
The race was held at Charlotte Motor Speedway, a motorsports complex located in Concord, North Carolina, United States, 13 miles from Charlotte, North Carolina. The complex features a 1.5 miles (2.4 km) quad-oval track that hosts NASCAR racing including the prestigious Coca-Cola 600 on Memorial Day weekend and the Sprint All-Star Race, as well as the Bank of America 500. The speedway was built in 1959 by Bruton Smith and is considered the home track for NASCAR with many race teams located in the Charlotte area. The track is owned and operated by Speedway Motorsports (SMI) with Marcus G. Smith (son of Bruton Smith) as track president.

=== Entry list ===
Forty-four drivers were entered for the race.

No.	Driver	Team	Manufacturer
1	Jamie McMurray	Chip Ganassi Racing	Chevrolet
2	Brad Keselowski (PC2) (CC)	Team Penske	Ford
3	Austin Dillon (R)	Richard Childress Racing	Chevrolet
4	Kevin Harvick (CC)	Stewart–Haas Racing	Chevrolet
5	Kasey Kahne (CC)	Hendrick Motorsports	Chevrolet
6	Trevor Bayne (i)	Roush Fenway Racing	Ford
7	Michael Annett (R)	Tommy Baldwin Racing	Chevrolet
9	Marcos Ambrose	Richard Petty Motorsports	Ford
10	Danica Patrick	Stewart–Haas Racing	Chevrolet
11	Denny Hamlin (CC)	Joe Gibbs Racing	Toyota
13	Casey Mears	Germain Racing	Chevrolet
14	Tony Stewart (PC3)	Stewart–Haas Racing	Chevrolet
15	Clint Bowyer	Michael Waltrip Racing	Toyota
16	Greg Biffle	Roush Fenway Racing	Ford
17	Ricky Stenhouse Jr.	Roush Fenway Racing	Ford
18	Kyle Busch (CC)	Joe Gibbs Racing	Toyota
20	Matt Kenseth (PC5) (CC)	Joe Gibbs Racing	Toyota
22	Joey Logano (CC)	Team Penske	Ford
23	Alex Bowman (R)	BK Racing	Toyota
24	Jeff Gordon (PC6) (CC)	Hendrick Motorsports	Chevrolet
26	Cole Whitt (R)	BK Racing	Toyota
27	Paul Menard	Richard Childress Racing	Chevrolet
31	Ryan Newman (CC)	Richard Childress Racing	Chevrolet
32	Blake Koch (i)	Go FAS Racing	Ford
33	Timmy Hill	Hillman–Circle Sport	Chevrolet
34	David Ragan	Front Row Motorsports	Ford
36	Reed Sorenson	Tommy Baldwin Racing	Chevrolet
38	David Gilliland	Front Row Motorsports	Ford
40	Landon Cassill (i)	Hillman–Circle Sport	Chevrolet
41	Kurt Busch (PC4)	Stewart–Haas Racing	Chevrolet
42	Kyle Larson (R)	Chip Ganassi Racing	Chevrolet
43	Aric Almirola	Richard Petty Motorsports	Ford
47	A. J. Allmendinger	JTG Daugherty Racing	Chevrolet
48	Jimmie Johnson (PC1) (CC)	Hendrick Motorsports	Chevrolet
51	Justin Allgaier (R)	HScott Motorsports	Chevrolet
55	Brian Vickers	Michael Waltrip Racing	Toyota
66	Brett Moffitt	Identity Ventures Racing	Toyota
77	Corey Lajoie (i)	Randy Humphrey Racing	Ford
78	Martin Truex Jr.	Furniture Row Racing	Chevrolet
83	J. J. Yeley (i)	BK Racing	Toyota
88	Dale Earnhardt Jr. (CC)	Hendrick Motorsports	Chevrolet
95	Michael McDowell	Leavine Family Racing	Ford
98	Josh Wise	Phil Parsons Racing	Chevrolet
99	Carl Edwards (CC)	Roush Fenway Racing	Ford
Official entry list

Key	Meaning
(R)	Rookie
(i)	Ineligible for points
(PC#)	Past champions provisional
(CC)	Chase Contender

== Practice and qualifying ==
Kevin Harvick was the fastest in the first practice session with a time of 27.542 and a speed of 196.192 mph (315.740 km/h). Kyle Busch won the pole with a time of 27.357 and a speed of 197.390 mph (317.668 km/h). “With the way the eliminations are, I would believe we are edging our way to the top,’’ Busch said. “But anything can happen. You just got to pick through it all.’’ "Oh my gosh, it's so fast, so much grip, so much commitment," Jeff Gordon said after qualifying second. "... That's a great place to start this race." Jimmie Johnson, who enters the race twelfth in points, qualified 21st. “Just didn’t have the speed on that final run, I got pretty tight off of (Turn) 4,’’ Johnson said. “I thought we had some hope after the first round. Our second outing we ran a very good lap and just didn’t have any more there on that lap through Turns 3 and 4, got wide and had to let off (the accelerator) a little bit so I didn’t get into the outside wall. Disappointing. No way around it.’’ Trevor Bayne failed to qualify for the race. Kurt Busch was the fastest in the second practice session with a time of 28.249 and a speed of 191.157 mph (307.637 km/h). Joey Logano was the fastest in the final practice session with a time of 28.332 and a speed of 190.597 mph (306.736 km/h). Jimmie Johnson tagged the wall in the closing minutes of the session. The damage wasn't enough to warrant rolling out the backup car. “The car’s really fast,” Johnson said. “We were feeling really good about things. The good news is that it’s just a big scratch. Just a little drama.”

=== Qualifying Results ===
Pos	No.	Driver	Team	Manufacturer	R1	R2	R3
1	18	Kyle Busch	Joe Gibbs Racing	Toyota	27.395	27.335	27.357
2	24	Jeff Gordon	Hendrick Motorsports	Chevrolet	27.471	27.283	27.381
3	11	Denny Hamlin	Joe Gibbs Racing	Toyota	27.542	27.441	27.399
4	14	Tony Stewart	Stewart–Haas Racing	Chevrolet	27.532	27.361	27.489
5	31	Ryan Newman	Richard Childress Racing	Chevrolet	27.421	27.481	27.489
6	27	Paul Menard	Richard Childress Racing	Chevrolet	27.610	27.387	27.537
7	4	Kevin Harvick	Stewart–Haas Racing	Chevrolet	27.286	27.282	27.574
8	55	Brian Vickers	Michael Waltrip Racing	Toyota	27.499	27.480	27.587
9	88	Dale Earnhardt Jr.	Hendrick Motorsports	Chevrolet	27.531	27.435	27.699
10	99	Carl Edwards	Roush Fenway Racing	Ford	27.347	27.426	27.712
11	41	Kurt Busch	Stewart–Haas Racing	Chevrolet	27.545	27.167	27.788
12	16	Greg Biffle	Roush Fenway Racing	Ford	27.616	27.390	28.184
13	22	Joey Logano	Team Penske	Ford	27.374	27.483	—
14	10	Danica Patrick	Stewart–Haas Racing	Chevrolet	27.558	27.486	—
15	43	Aric Almirola	Richard Petty Motorsports	Ford	27.505	27.489	—
16	51	Justin Allgaier (R)	HScott Motorsports	Chevrolet	27.587	27.493	—
17	2	Brad Keselowski	Team Penske	Ford	27.417	27.512	—
18	1	Jamie McMurray	Chip Ganassi Racing	Chevrolet	27.454	27.512	—
19	5	Kasey Kahne	Hendrick Motorsports	Chevrolet	27.276	27.513	—
20	3	Austin Dillon (R)	Richard Childress Racing	Chevrolet	27.487	27.522	—
21	48	Jimmie Johnson	Hendrick Motorsports	Chevrolet	27.488	27.527	—
22	20	Matt Kenseth (Note: Matt Kenseth started from the rear for unapproved changes to the car.)	Joe Gibbs Racing	Toyota	27.648	27.535	—
23	78	Martin Truex Jr.	Furniture Row Racing	Chevrolet	27.530	27.589	—
24	42	Kyle Larson (R)	Chip Ganassi Racing	Chevrolet	27.585	27.597	—
25	15	Clint Bowyer	Michael Waltrip Racing	Toyota	27.651	—	—
26	47	A. J. Allmendinger	JTG Daugherty Racing	Chevrolet	27.653	—	—
27	9	Marcos Ambrose	Richard Petty Motorsports	Ford	27.740	—	—
28	17	Ricky Stenhouse Jr.	Roush Fenway Racing	Ford	27.796	—	—
29	13	Casey Mears	Germain Racing	Chevrolet	27.819	—	—
30	36	Reed Sorenson	Tommy Baldwin Racing	Chevrolet	27.873	—	—
31	95	Michael McDowell	Leavine Family Racing	Ford	27.912	—	—
32	40	Landon Cassill	Hillman–Circle Sport	Chevrolet	27.926	—	—
33	23	Alex Bowman (R)	BK Racing	Toyota	27.947	—	—
34	34	David Ragan	Front Row Motorsports	Ford	27.954	—	—
35	7	Michael Annett (R)	Tommy Baldwin Racing	Chevrolet	27.968	—	—
36	26	Cole Whitt (R)	BK Racing	Toyota	27.983	—	—
37	38	David Gilliland	Front Row Motorsports	Ford	28.010	—	—
38	98	Josh Wise	Phil Parsons Racing	Chevrolet	28.113	—	—
39	66	Brett Moffitt	Identity Ventures Racing	Ford	28.158	—	—
40	33	Timmy Hill	Hillman–Circle Sport	Chevrolet	28.276	—	—
41	83	J. J. Yeley	BK Racing	Toyota	28.386	—	—
42	77	Corey LaJoie	Randy Humphrey Racing	Ford	28.386	—	—
43	32	Blake Koch	Go FAS Racing	Ford	28.816	—	—
Did not qualify
	6	Trevor Bayne	Roush Fenway Racing	Ford	28.061	—	—

== Race ==
=== First half ===
==== Start ====
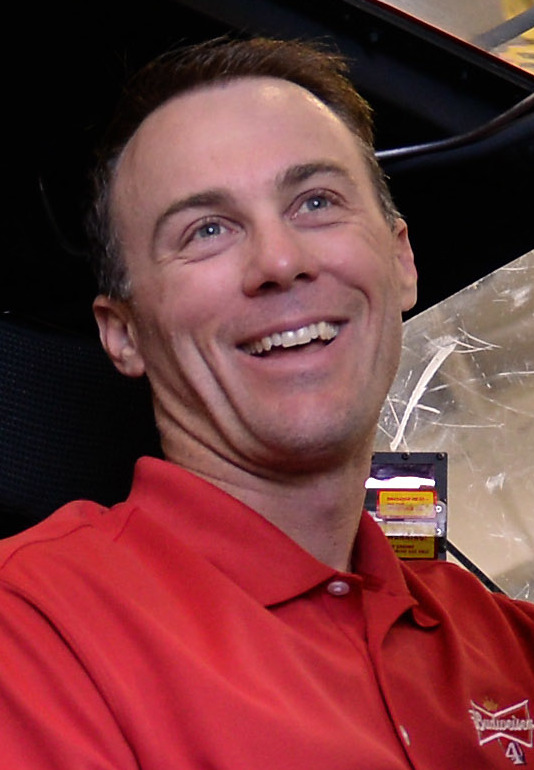
Kevin Harvick won the race.

Prior to the start of the race, Matt Kenseth had to drop to the rear of the field for unapproved adjustments.

The race started at 7:54 p.m. Kyle Busch led early in the race, though Jeff Gordon took the lead on lap 14. The first of eight cautions in the race flew on lap 26. It was a planned competition caution. Following the caution, Dale Earnhardt Jr. won the race off pit road to assume the lead. Earnhardt Jr. led the restart on lap 31, and promptly lost the lead to Kyle Busch.

The second caution of the race flew on lap 96 when Clint Bowyer blew an engine exiting turn 4. Dale Earnhardt Jr. took just two tires, and exited as the leader. Following the restart on lap 101, Jamie McMurray took the lead. Kevin Harvick then took the lead on lap 105.

Paul Menard brought out the third caution on lap 136 after blowing an engine on the backstretch. Describing the incident, Menard said, “Something with the motor. I had a really good car. It’s too bad, awesome car; we had a pit stop problem and went to the back, but drove our way back up into the top 15 or so.”

Earnhardt Jr. pitted while the pits were closed to fix a broken shifter. This was similar to what happened to his teammate Jimmie Johnson at Michigan two months prior. Harvick and Gordon traded the lead on the pit road, with Harvick winning the race off.

The fourth caution of the race flew on lap 221 after Josh Wise blew an engine. The race restarted on lap 227. The fifth caution of the race flew with 98 laps to go after Brian Vickers got loose and spun in turn 4. Austin Dillon stayed out when the leaders pitted and took over the lead. The race restarted with 92 laps to go, and Kyle Busch retook the lead.

The sixth caution of the race flew with 89 laps to go after Joey Logano tapped the left-rear corner panel of Danica Patrick, who connected with the wall. Ryan Newman spun to avoid hitting her. The race restarted with 82 laps to go, and Kyle Larson took the lead with 71 laps to go.

The seventh caution flew with 68 laps to go when Michael Annett was slowing with a flat left-rear tire. Brad Keselowski stayed out when the leaders pitted and assumed the lead. The race restarted with 63 laps to go, and Denny Hamlin promptly took the lead. Kevin Harvick retook the lead with 41 laps to go.

=== Second half ===
In the final 25 laps of the race, a number of lead changes occurred. Kevin Harvick made his final stop with 23 laps to go and handed the lead to Jeff Gordon. Gordon made his final stop with 22 laps to go and handed the lead to Kurt Busch, who in turn made his final stop with 21 laps to go, handing the lead to Austin Dillon. Dillon made his final stop with 20 laps to go, with Ryan Newman assuming the lead. Newman made his final stop with 19 laps to go and Carl Edwards took the lead. Edwards made his final stop with 18 laps to go and handed the lead to Justin Allgaier. Allgaier made his final stop with 16 laps to go and the lead cycled back to Kevin Harvick.

The eighth caution of the race flew with seven laps to go, after Brian Vickers blew an engine. The race restarted with two laps to go and Harvick shot ahead of Jeff Gordon to win the race. “Oh, we came here and tested thinking that this was going to be the hardest round to get through because of Talladega,” Harvick said. “There’s so much that you can’t control there. We wanted to try to control the things that we could control. We felt like Kansas and here (Charlotte) were playing to our strengths; and just see where it fell after that once we get to the next round. So I’m really proud of everybody at SHR. I’m really proud of all my guys on this team. I just can’t thank everybody enough.” "I'm really proud of that finish, really proud of that effort," Gordon said. " ... Kevin was tough. I knew he was going to be tough once he got out there."

==== Post race conflict ====
Keselowski and Hamlin were angry with one another on the cool-down lap. Keselowski made contact with Matt Kenseth on pit road, while Matt had his seatbelt unbuckled and inadvertently rear-ended Tony Stewart, who then backed into the 2 car. In the garage area, Hamlin continued to confront Keselowski by throwing a towel at him before NASCAR officials and crew members escorted Hamlin to the team trailer. While Keselowski was walking to his hauler, he was attacked from behind by Kenseth with Kenseth screaming "I had my belts off, and you wrecked me after the race" with Keselowski responding to Kenseth "you hit me under yellow" three times until he was pulled out by Keselowski's crew chef Paul Wolfe. “When the last yellow came out, he got the wave around and when he came by, he swung by my car and tore the whole right front off of it,’’ Keselowski said of Kenseth. "We restarted fifth with no right front on it and fell back to 16th and ruined our day. For some reason after the race (Hamlin) stopped in front of me and tried to pick a fight. I don’t know what that was about. He swung and hit at my car. I figure if we’re going to play car wars under the yellow and after the race, I’m going to play, too. Those guys can dish it out and they can’t take it. I gave it back to them and they want to fight." "(Brad Keselowski) was doing something with Denny (Hamlin), I don't know," Kenseth said. "The race had ended and he's running into cars on the cool down lap. I mean, the race is over and he comes down pit road and drives into the side of me - that's inexcusable. He's a champion and he's supposed to know better." "When you see Matt Kenseth mad enough to fight, you know that this is intense because that's way out of character for him," Harvick said. "Every moment matters in this Chase, and Matt Kenseth knew that that one particular moment could have been the end of his Chase."

===== Post-race penalties =====
On Tuesday, October 14, NASCAR handed down penalties regarding the events following the race. Brad Keselowski was fined $50,000 and placed on NASCAR probation for the next four Sprint Cup Series championship events through November 12 for violating:

- Section 12-1: Actions detrimental to stock car racing
- Section 12-4.9: Behavioral penalty—involved in post-race incidents

Tony Stewart was also fined $25,000 and placed on NASCAR probation for the next four Cup Series races through November 12 for the same charges.

"These penalties are about maintaining a safe environment following the race," said Robin Pemberton, NASCAR senior vice president, competition and racing development. "We knew that the new Chase format was likely going to raise the intensity level and we want our drivers to continue to be themselves. However, the safety of our drivers, crew members, officials, and workers is paramount and we will react when that safety could be compromised."

=== Race statistics ===
- 32 lead changes among different drivers
- 8 cautions for 39 laps
- Time of race: 3 hours, 26 minutes and 49 seconds
- Average speed: 145.346 mph (233.912 km/h)
- Kevin Harvick took home $301,468 in winnings in his third win of the year.

== Race results ==
Pos	No.	Driver	Team	Manufacturer	Laps	Points
1	4	Kevin Harvick	Stewart–Haas Racing	Chevrolet	334	48
2	24	Jeff Gordon	Hendrick Motorsports	Chevrolet	334	43
3	1	Jamie McMurray	Chip Ganassi Racing	Chevrolet	334	42
4	22	Joey Logano	Team Penske	Ford	334	40
5	18	Kyle Busch	Joe Gibbs Racing	Toyota	334	40
6	42	Kyle Larson (R)	Chip Ganassi Racing	Chevrolet	334	39
7	31	Ryan Newman	Richard Childress Racing	Chevrolet	334	38
8	99	Carl Edwards	Roush Fenway Racing	Ford	334	37
9	11	Denny Hamlin	Joe Gibbs Racing	Toyota	334	36
10	5	Kasey Kahne	Hendrick Motorsports	Chevrolet	334	34
11	41	Kurt Busch	Stewart–Haas Racing	Chevrolet	334	34
12	47	A. J. Allmendinger	JTG Daugherty Racing	Chevrolet	334	32
13	3	Austin Dillon (R)	Richard Childress Racing	Chevrolet	334	32
14	78	Martin Truex Jr.	Furniture Row Racing	Chevrolet	334	30
15	51	Justin Allgaier (R)	HScott Motorsports	Chevrolet	334	30
16	2	Brad Keselowski	Team Penske	Ford	334	29
17	48	Jimmie Johnson	Hendrick Motorsports	Chevrolet	334	27
18	16	Greg Biffle	Roush Fenway Racing	Ford	334	26
19	20	Matt Kenseth	Joe Gibbs Racing	Toyota	334	25
20	88	Dale Earnhardt Jr.	Hendrick Motorsports	Chevrolet	333	25
21	14	Tony Stewart	Stewart–Haas Racing	Chevrolet	333	23
22	43	Aric Almirola	Richard Petty Motorsports	Ford	332	22
23	40	Landon Cassill	Hillman–Circle Sport	Chevrolet	331	0
24	17	Ricky Stenhouse Jr.	Roush Fenway Racing	Ford	331	20
25	9	Marcos Ambrose	Richard Petty Motorsports	Ford	331	19
26	10	Danica Patrick	Stewart–Haas Racing	Chevrolet	331	18
27	36	Reed Sorenson	Tommy Baldwin Racing	Chevrolet	330	17
28	26	Cole Whitt (R)	BK Racing	Toyota	330	16
29	95	Michael McDowell	Leavine Family Racing	Ford	330	15
30	23	Alex Bowman (R)	BK Racing	Toyota	330	14
31	13	Casey Mears	Germain Racing	Chevrolet	329	13
32	38	David Gilliland	Front Row Motorsports	Ford	329	12
33	7	Michael Annett (R)	Tommy Baldwin Racing	Chevrolet	328	12
34	34	David Ragan	Front Row Motorsports	Ford	328	10
35	77	Corey Lajoie	Randy Humphrey Racing	Ford	326	0
36	33	Timmy Hill	Hillman–Circle Sport	Chevrolet	326	8
37	55	Brian Vickers	Michael Waltrip Racing	Toyota	325	7
38	83	J. J. Yeley	BK Racing	Toyota	325	0
39	32	Blake Koch	Go FAS Racing	Ford	322	0
40	66	Brett Moffitt	Identity Ventures Racing	Toyota	320	4
41	98	Josh Wise	Phil Parsons Racing	Chevrolet	178	3
42	27	Paul Menard	Richard Childress Racing	Chevrolet	134	2
43	15	Clint Bowyer	Michael Waltrip Racing	Toyota	94	1

=== Standings after the race ===
Drivers' Championship standings

	Pos	Driver	Points
	1	Joey Logano	3,088
	2	Kyle Busch	3,082 (-6)
3	3	Kevin Harvick	3,081 (-7)
	4	Ryan Newman	3,077 (-11)
2	5	Carl Edwards	3,076 (-12)
2	6	Jeff Gordon	3,074 (-14)
2	7	Denny Hamlin	3,073 (-15)
1	8	Kasey Kahne	3,057 (-31)
2	9	Matt Kenseth	3,056 (-32)
	10	Brad Keselowski	3,038 (-50)
1	11	Jimmie Johnson	3,031 (-57)
1	12	Dale Earnhardt Jr.	3,031 (-57)
	13	A. J. Allmendinger	2,142 (-946)
	14	Greg Biffle	2,127 (-961)
	15	Kurt Busch	2,109 (-979)
	16	Aric Almirola	2,096 (-992)

Manufacturers' Championship standings

Pos	Manufacturer	Points
1	Chevrolet	1,388
2	Ford	1,361 (-27)
3	Toyota	1,243 (-145)

- Note: Only the first sixteen positions are included for the driver standings.

== Note ==
Previous race: 2014 Hollywood Casino 400	Sprint Cup Series; 2014 season	Next race: 2014 GEICO 500
