= 2014 GEICO 500 =

32nd race of 2014 NASCAR Sprint Cup series

Race details
- Race 32 of 36 in the 2014 NASCAR Sprint Cup Series
- Date: October 19, 2014
- Location: Talladega Superspeedway in Lincoln, Alabama
- Course: Permanent racing facility
- Course length: 2.66 miles (4.281 km)
- Distance: 194 laps, 516.04 mi (830.486 km)
- Scheduled distance: 188 laps, 500.08 mi (804.801 km)
- Weather: Partly cloudy with a temperature of 68 °F (20 °C); wind out of the northwest at 4 miles per hour (6.4 km/h)
- Average speed: 160.302 mph (257.981 km/h)

Pole position
Driver	Brian Vickers	Michael Waltrip Racing
- Time: 48.825

Most laps led
Driver	Jimmie Johnson	Hendrick Motorsports
- Laps: 84

Winner
No. 2	Brad Keselowski	Team Penske

Television in the United States
- Network: ESPN & MRN
- Announcers: Allen Bestwick, Dale Jarrett and Andy Petree (Television); Joe Moore and Jeff Striegle (Booth); Dave Moody (1 & 2), Mike Bagley (Backstretch) and Buddy Long (3 & 4) (Turns) (Radio)
- Nielsen ratings: 3.0/7 (Final); 2.8/7 (Overnight); 4.757 Million viewers (Note: Due to a minor crediting error, the original 2.7/6 rating and 4.358 viewing figure has been updated.)

The 2014 GEICO 500 was a NASCAR Sprint Cup Series stock car race that was held on October 19, 2014, at Talladega Superspeedway in Lincoln, Alabama. Contested over 194 laps on the 2.66-mile (4.28-kilometre) super speedway, it was the 32nd race of the 2014 Sprint Cup Series season, as well as the sixth race of ten in the Chase for the Sprint Cup. Brad Keselowski held off hard charges from Ryan Newman, Matt Kenseth and Landon Cassill to score his sixth win of the season. Kenseth finished second, while Clint Bowyer, Cassill, and Newman rounded out the top five. The top rookies of the race were Austin Dillon (13th), Cole Whitt (15th), and Kyle Larson (17th).

== Report ==
=== Background ===
Talladega Superspeedway is a motorsports complex located north of Talladega, Alabama, United States. It is located on the former Anniston Air Force Base in the small city of Lincoln. The track is a Tri-oval and was constructed by International Speedway Corporation, a business controlled by the France Family, in the 1960s. Talladega is most known for its steep banking and the unique location of the start/finish line - which is closer to turn one than at Daytona. The track currently hosts the NASCAR series such as the Cup Series, Xfinity Series, and the Craftsman Truck Series. Talladega Superspeedway is the longest NASCAR oval with a length of 2.66 miles (4.28 kilometres), and the track at its peak had a seating capacity of 175,000 spectators, although the current capacity is 80,000 seats.

==== Knockout rule changes ====
On September 4, NASCAR announced changes to the knockout format for Daytona and Talladega in an effort to speed up the qualifying process.

The following modifications were made to the knockout qualifying format for restrictor plate races. All other rules first implemented at the Las Vegas race will continue to be used.

- All rounds of qualifying will be five minutes.
- In the first round, competitors will be assigned to one of two qualifying round group based on the random draw held earlier in the event.
- Each half of the first round is five minutes each.
- Regardless of which round the driver's fast time was set, the 24 fastest competitors combined between the two rounds advance to the second round.
- The first break between rounds is ten minutes.
- The second break between rounds is five minutes.

=== Entry list ===
Forty-six drivers were entered for the race.

No.	Driver	Team	Manufacturer
1	Jamie McMurray	Chip Ganassi Racing	Chevrolet
2	Brad Keselowski (PC2) (CC)	Team Penske	Ford
3	Austin Dillon (R)	Richard Childress Racing	Chevrolet
4	Kevin Harvick (CC)	Stewart–Haas Racing	Chevrolet
5	Kasey Kahne (CC)	Hendrick Motorsports	Chevrolet
7	Michael Annett (R)	Tommy Baldwin Racing	Chevrolet
9	Marcos Ambrose	Richard Petty Motorsports	Ford
10	Danica Patrick	Stewart–Haas Racing	Chevrolet
11	Denny Hamlin (CC)	Joe Gibbs Racing	Toyota
12	Ryan Blaney (i)	Team Penske	Ford
13	Casey Mears	Germain Racing	Chevrolet
14	Tony Stewart (PC3)	Stewart–Haas Racing	Chevrolet
15	Clint Bowyer	Michael Waltrip Racing	Toyota
16	Greg Biffle	Roush Fenway Racing	Ford
17	Ricky Stenhouse Jr.	Roush Fenway Racing	Ford
18	Kyle Busch (CC)	Joe Gibbs Racing	Toyota
20	Matt Kenseth (PC5) (CC)	Joe Gibbs Racing	Toyota
21	Ryan Blaney (i)	Wood Brothers Racing	Ford
22	Joey Logano (CC)	Team Penske	Ford
23	Alex Bowman (R)	BK Racing	Toyota
24	Jeff Gordon (PC6) (CC)	Hendrick Motorsports	Chevrolet
26	Cole Whitt (R)	BK Racing	Toyota
27	Paul Menard	Richard Childress Racing	Chevrolet
29	Joe Nemechek (i)	RAB Racing	Toyota
31	Ryan Newman (CC)	Richard Childress Racing	Chevrolet
32	Terry Labonte (PC7)	Go FAS Racing	Ford
33	Travis Kvapil	Hillman–Circle Sport	Chevrolet
34	David Ragan	Front Row Motorsports	Ford
36	Reed Sorenson	Tommy Baldwin Racing	Chevrolet
38	David Gilliland	Front Row Motorsports	Ford
40	Landon Cassill (i)	Hillman–Circle Sport	Chevrolet
41	Kurt Busch (PC4)	Stewart–Haas Racing	Chevrolet
42	Kyle Larson (R)	Chip Ganassi Racing	Chevrolet
43	Aric Almirola	Richard Petty Motorsports	Ford
47	A. J. Allmendinger	JTG Daugherty Racing	Chevrolet
48	Jimmie Johnson (PC1) (CC)	Hendrick Motorsports	Chevrolet
49	Mike Wallace (i)	Identity Ventures Racing	Toyota
51	Justin Allgaier (R)	HScott Motorsports	Chevrolet
55	Brian Vickers	Michael Waltrip Racing	Toyota
66	Michael Waltrip (i)	Identity Ventures Racing	Toyota
78	Martin Truex Jr.	Furniture Row Racing	Chevrolet
83	J. J. Yeley (i)	BK Racing	Toyota
88	Dale Earnhardt Jr. (CC)	Hendrick Motorsports	Chevrolet
95	Michael McDowell	Leavine Family Racing	Ford
98	Josh Wise	Phil Parsons Racing	Ford
99	Carl Edwards (CC)	Roush Fenway Racing	Ford
Official entry list

Key	Meaning
(R)	Rookie
(i)	Ineligible for points
(PC#)	Past champions provisional
(CC)	Chase Contender

== Practice and qualifying ==
Clint Bowyer was the fastest in the first practice session with a time of 47.788 and a speed of 200.385 mph (322.488 km/h). Kyle Busch was the fastest in the final practice session with a time of 49.056 and a speed of 195.205 mph (314.152 km/h). Brian Vickers won the pole with a time of 48.825 and a speed of 196.129 mph (315.639 km/h). “I thought that coming to three (laps) to go that we literally no shot,’’ said Vickers, who scored his first career Sprint Cup victory at this track in 2006. “We were way back. Like a half a straightaway behind the whole field and they all checked up and gave me a chance and gave me a run.’’ Justin Allgaier, Joe Nemechek and Ricky Stenhouse Jr. failed to qualify. “I thought being the last car in line would be beneficial for us,’’ Stenhouse said. “We had Jeff Gordon leading the pack there I thought we would have a good shot at putting a good lap in, but my spotter was telling me, ‘Hey, you have 30 seconds to get across the start-finish line’ as we were entering Turn 3. I don't guess Eddie d'Hondt (No. 24 team spotter) was giving him a lot of information. He kept slowing the pack down, and we didn't get a good lap and never got across the start-finish line in time. My spotter was giving me the information I needed, and I wish (Gordon's spotter) would have been doing the same.” Jeff Gordon started 43rd for only the second time in his career. “The plan was shot before the plan started,’’ Gordon said. “I messed up ultimately. I just mistimed getting to the line. The whole group was going so slow, I knew I had to have a gap. When I came across the line, I thought I had enough to be able to complete that lap and get one more, which was the only way we were going to be to make it (to the second round), but we came up short. It’s a mess out there. It’s not easy.’’ Originally, Nemechek made it through the first round, but his time was disallowed after the oil tank encasement was found to be improperly installed. This allowed Reed Sorenson, who originally failed to qualify, to start the race. Brad Keselowski qualified fifth, but due to an alternator change (parc fermé rules are in effect at Talladega), started from the rear along with Matt Kenseth, who changed an engine. Terry Labonte, who made his final start, qualified ninth (although he had to go to the rear of the field due after NASCAR made the team change their paint scheme). It was his best qualifying performance since Sonoma 2005. "You know, it's only about the third time I've said this is gonna be my last race, but this is really gonna be the last one," he said Saturday. "It's been fun."

=== Qualifying Results ===
Pos	No.	Driver	Team	Manufacturer	R1	R2	R3
1	55	Brian Vickers	Michael Waltrip Racing	Toyota	49.111	49.171	48.825
2	48	Jimmie Johnson	Hendrick Motorsports	Chevrolet	49.731	48.634	48.924
3	47	A. J. Allmendinger	JTG Daugherty Racing	Chevrolet	49.040	49.001	48.983
4	12	Ryan Blaney	Team Penske	Ford	48.994	48.877	49.357
5	2	Brad Keselowski (Note: Brad Keselowski started from the rear for an alternator change.)	Team Penske	Ford	49.019	48.906	49.359
6	95	Michael McDowell	Leavine Family Racing	Ford	49.548	49.132	49.439
7	33	Travis Kvapil	Hillman–Circle Sport	Chevrolet	49.172	48.632	49.462
8	5	Kasey Kahne	Hendrick Motorsports	Chevrolet	48.649	48.639	49.489
9	32	Terry Labonte (Note: Terry Labonte started from the rear after NASCAR made him change his paint scheme livery.)	Go FAS Racing	Ford	48.914	49.317	49.506
10	7	Michael Annett (R)	Tommy Baldwin Racing	Chevrolet	49.018	48.646	49.575
11	31	Ryan Newman	Richard Childress Racing	Chevrolet	48.439	48.661	50.057
12	78	Martin Truex Jr.	Furniture Row Racing	Chevrolet	48.686	48.644	50.141
13	20	Matt Kenseth (Note: Matt Kenseth started from the rear for an engine change following final practice.)	Joe Gibbs Racing	Toyota	49.889	49.510	—
14	23	Alex Bowman (R)	BK Racing	Toyota	49.522	49.520	—
15	99	Carl Edwards	Roush Fenway Racing	Ford	49.216	49.542	—
16	21	Trevor Bayne	Wood Brothers Racing	Ford	48.901	49.771	—
17	43	Aric Almirola	Richard Petty Motorsports	Ford	49.529	49.803	—
18	41	Kurt Busch	Stewart–Haas Racing	Chevrolet	49.950	49.850	—
19	13	Casey Mears	Germain Racing	Chevrolet	48.298	49.899	—
20	27	Paul Menard	Richard Childress Racing	Chevrolet	48.144	49.934	—
21	38	David Gilliland	Front Row Motorsports	Ford	49.521	50.140	—
22	26	Cole Whitt (R)	BK Racing	Toyota	49.203	50.144	—
23	49	Mike Wallace	Identity Ventures Racing	Toyota	49.593	51.838	—
24	29	Joe Nemechek (Note: Joe Nemechek's time was disallowed after his car failed post-race inspection.)	RAB Racing	Toyota	49.508	0.000	—
25	16	Greg Biffle	Roush Fenway Racing	Ford	49.985	—	—
26	34	David Ragan	Front Row Motorsports	Ford	50.026	—	—
27	9	Marcos Ambrose	Richard Petty Motorsports	Ford	50.080	—	—
28	10	Danica Patrick	Stewart–Haas Racing	Chevrolet	50.097	—	—
29	88	Dale Earnhardt Jr.	Hendrick Motorsports	Chevrolet	50.101	—	—
30	40	Landon Cassill	Hillman–Circle Sport	Chevrolet	50.102	—	—
31	3	Austin Dillon (R)	Richard Childress Racing	Chevrolet	50.129	—	—
32	1	Jamie McMurray	Chip Ganassi Racing	Chevrolet	50.184	—	—
33	83	J. J. Yeley	BK Racing	Toyota	50.218	—	—
34	15	Clint Bowyer	Michael Waltrip Racing	Toyota	50.220	—	—
35	66	Michael Waltrip	Identity Ventures Racing	Toyota	50.245	—	—
36	98	Josh Wise	Phil Parsons Racing	Ford	50.266	—	—
37	14	Tony Stewart	Stewart–Haas Racing	Chevrolet	50.590	—	—
38	11	Denny Hamlin	Joe Gibbs Racing	Toyota	50.863	—	—
39	4	Kevin Harvick	Stewart–Haas Racing	Chevrolet	51.110	—	—
40	22	Joey Logano	Team Penske	Ford	53.980	—	—
41	18	Kyle Busch	Joe Gibbs Racing	Toyota	54.065	—	—
42	42	Kyle Larson (R)	Chip Ganassi Racing	Chevrolet	54.163	—	—
43	24	Jeff Gordon	Hendrick Motorsports	Chevrolet	54.245	—	—
Did not qualify
44	17	Ricky Stenhouse Jr.	Roush Fenway Racing	Ford	54.118	—	—
45	51	Justin Allgaier (R)	HScott Motorsports	Chevrolet	54.166	—	—
46	36	Reed Sorenson (Note: Because Joe Nemechek failed post-race inspection, Reed Sorenson, who originally failed to qualify, was bumped back into the race.)	Tommy Baldwin Racing	Chevrolet	50.585	—	—

== Race ==
=== First half ===
==== Start ====
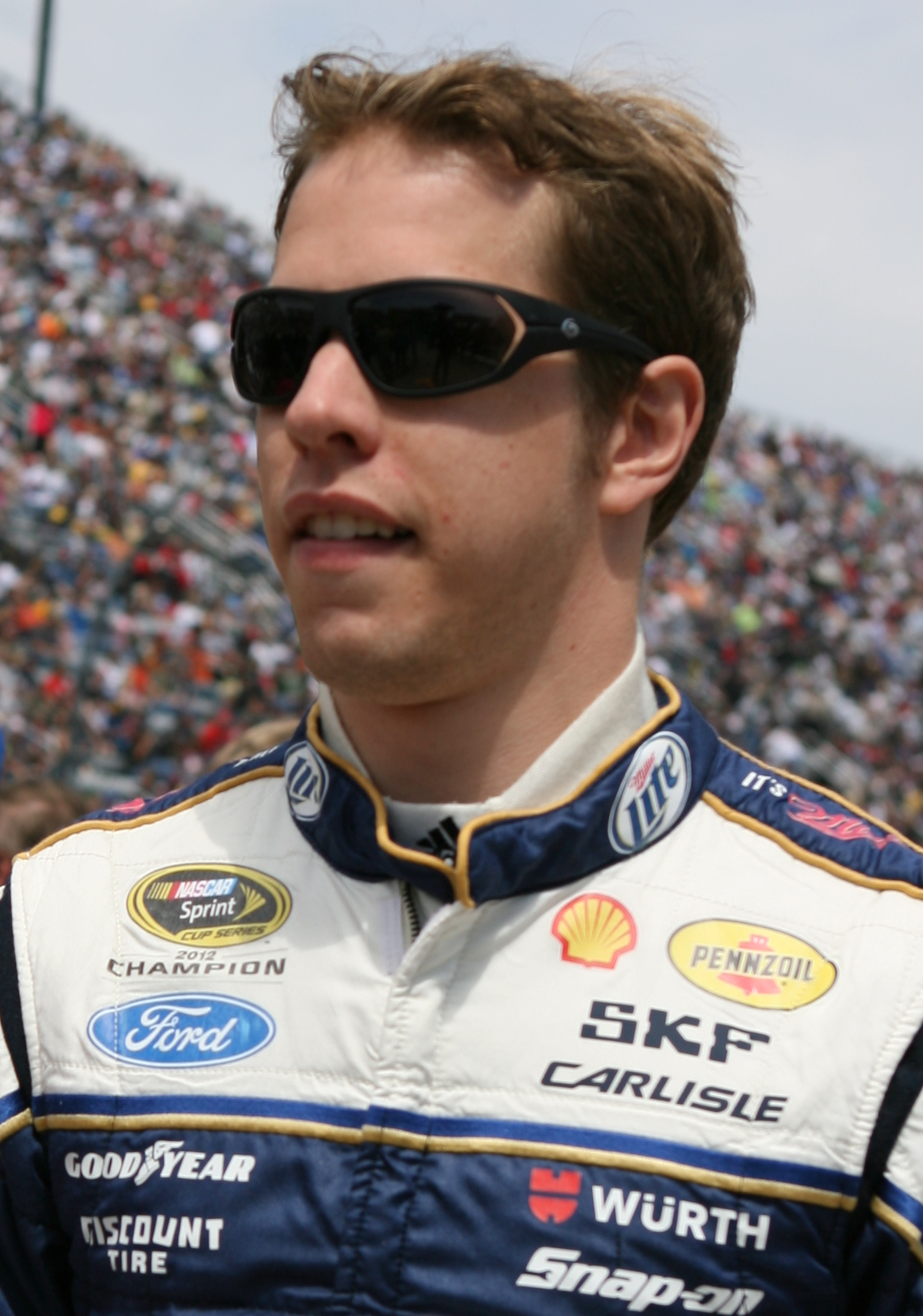
Brad Keselowski won the race.

The race started with Brian Vickers leading the field to the green. He didn't hold the lead for long as Jimmie Johnson took the lead from him on lap one, but Ryan Blaney took the lead from Johnson on lap two. Then Johnson retook the lead on lap 15. Johnson ducked onto pit road to make his first stop of the race on lap 39.

The first caution of the race flew on lap 60 when Jamie McMurray cut a tire and turned down into Joey Logano past the exit of turn 4. "It's not destroyed, but it's pushed in. I see zero damage behind the exhaust," Keselowski's spotter Joey Meier reported to the crew. Jimmie Johnson took the lead back from Kahne when the leaders pitted.

The race restarted on lap 66. Dale Earnhardt Jr. took the lead on lap 75. Just as the leaders were preparing to make their scheduled stop, the second caution of the race flew on lap 103 for a large crash on the backstretch. It started when Aric Almirola hooked J. J. Yeley into the backstretch wall, and collecting 8 more cars with Kyle Busch taking the worst hit. "We are destroyed...it's everything," Busch lamented on his car radio. Yeley, Kyle Busch, Aric Almirola, Austin Dillon, A. J. Allmendinger, Alex Bowman, Brian Vickers, Tony Stewart, Clint Bowyer and Terry Labonte were involved in the incident. "We had rear end damage, we got hit from behind, forced us into somebody in the front," team owner Joe Gibbs said in the garage as the crew made repairs. "The whole front fascia is gone. Our guys have done a great job, but we’ve had to replace a lot of the front end." "We were just all starting to shuffle around there and getting ready to pit, and I think it was the 83 in front of me, and I think he might have been trying to check up to get to the bottom," said Almirola. "I just barely started to push him and it hooked his car and we all wrecked." "It's disappointing," Rogers told FOXSports.com. "Everyone on this team has been executing really well, and I'm really proud of them, but something happened out of our control and took us out of the Chase. That's part of this sport. That's part of it. We all knew it coming into Talladega. We're the unfortunate victims this time. Kyle is ... I can’t praise him enough," said Rogers. "He has really stepped up to be a great leader of this race team in the Chase and we've had a couple things go against us - getting the nose knocked off at Loudon, today, and Kyle's done a really good job of biting his lip and just backing the race team and letting us do our job. Kyle, I can't say enough good about him. I'm really proud of him. It's been a lot of fun working with him through this Chase, and we're not done yet." David Gilliland stayed out when the leaders pitted and assumed the lead. He made a stop and handed the lead to Jeff Gordon. He stopped and gave the lead to Ryan Blaney.

=== Second half ===
The race restarted on lap 109, but the caution flew for the third time on lap 131 after Michael McDowell slammed the wall in turn 4. Cole Whitt stayed out when the leaders pitted to take the lead. He pitted the next lap and handed the lead back to Johnson.

The race restarted on lap 136, and remanded green, until Kyle Larson spun on the apron of turn 1 and brought out the fourth caution of the race with 14 laps to go. Jeff Gordon was the only car who hadn't pitted and had to give up the lead to stop for fuel. Ryan Newman cycled to the lead.

Debris brought out the fifth caution with five laps to go, so the race went past its advertised distance and went into overtime. The first overtime attempt, resulted in another crash on the backstretch that collected 5 cars. It started when David Gilliland tapped Greg Biffle who clipped Dale Earnhardt Jr. and collected two more cars. Brad Keselowski was ahead of race leader Newman and assumed the lead.

Brad Keselowski held off hard charging Ryan Newman and Matt Kenseth to win the race with the pack behind them, being stacked up. “I can’t believe it,” Keselowski said. “Talladega is such a wild card and to be able to win here you have to catch breaks and make your own breaks, a little of both. I can’t believe we won at Talladega. This race is the scariest of the three in the bracket. To be able to win here is really a privilege, it really is.” Kyle Busch, Dale Earnhardt Jr., Kasey Kahne and Jimmie Johnson were the four drivers who were eliminated. "We had a real good car most of the day," Earnhardt said. "Got real loose, kind of shuffled out. ... It's just hard racing. That's the way it goes at the end of these races. We weren't in good position."

==== Notables ====
This was the last race for Terry Labonte. Go FAS Racing planned a paint scheme mimicking his time in NASCAR, with the driver's side similar to his 1996 championship season and the passenger side painted like his 1984 car. Go FAS Racing had to change it after qualifying, since NASCAR mandates the left and right side must be identical and the team went with the 1996 style.

Hillman–Circle Sport had their best career finishes with a sixth place from Travis Kvapil and fourth from Landon Cassill, marking the first top five and top ten finishes for Cassill and the team.

Reed Sorenson finished a respectable 14th, considering that his Tommy Baldwin Racing car only got in after Joe Nemechek's time was disallowed.

==== Post-race ====
Ryan Newman's car was found to be too low in the rear on both sides in post-race inspections. However, this was found to be caused by race damage, so no penalties were issued.

== Race results ==
Pos	No.	Driver	Team	Manufacturer	Laps	Points
1	2	Brad Keselowski	Team Penske	Ford	194	47
2	20	Matt Kenseth	Joe Gibbs Racing	Toyota	194	43
3	15	Clint Bowyer	Michael Waltrip Racing	Toyota	194	41
4	40	Landon Cassill	Hillman–Circle Sport	Chevrolet	194	0
5	31	Ryan Newman	Richard Childress Racing	Chevrolet	194	40
6	33	Travis Kvapil	Hillman–Circle Sport	Chevrolet	194	38
7	41	Kurt Busch	Stewart–Haas Racing	Chevrolet	194	37
8	9	Marcos Ambrose	Richard Petty Motorsports	Ford	194	36
9	4	Kevin Harvick	Stewart–Haas Racing	Chevrolet	194	36
10	13	Casey Mears	Germain Racing	Chevrolet	194	34
11	22	Joey Logano	Team Penske	Ford	194	33
12	5	Kasey Kahne	Hendrick Motorsports	Chevrolet	194	33
13	3	Austin Dillon (R)	Richard Childress Racing	Chevrolet	194	31
14	36	Reed Sorenson	Tommy Baldwin Racing	Chevrolet	194	30
15	26	Cole Whitt (R)	BK Racing	Toyota	194	30
16	66	Michael Waltrip	Identity Ventures Racing	Toyota	194	28
17	42	Kyle Larson (R)	Chip Ganassi Racing	Chevrolet	194	27
18	11	Denny Hamlin	Joe Gibbs Racing	Toyota	194	27
19	10	Danica Patrick	Stewart–Haas Racing	Chevrolet	194	26
20	55	Brian Vickers	Michael Waltrip Racing	Toyota	194	24
21	99	Carl Edwards	Roush Fenway Racing	Ford	194	23
22	12	Ryan Blaney	Team Penske	Ford	194	0
23	47	A. J. Allmendinger	JTG Daugherty Racing	Chevrolet	194	21
24	48	Jimmie Johnson	Hendrick Motorsports	Chevrolet	194	22
25	16	Greg Biffle	Roush Fenway Racing	Ford	194	20
26	24	Jeff Gordon	Hendrick Motorsports	Chevrolet	194	19
27	78	Martin Truex Jr.	Furniture Row Racing	Chevrolet	194	18
28	98	Josh Wise	Phil Parsons Racing	Ford	194	16
29	38	David Gilliland	Front Row Motorsports	Ford	194	16
30	34	David Ragan	Front Row Motorsports	Ford	194	15
31	88	Dale Earnhardt Jr.	Hendrick Motorsports	Chevrolet	194	14
32	21	Trevor Bayne	Wood Brothers Racing	Ford	194	0
33	32	Terry Labonte	Go FAS Racing	Ford	193	11
34	14	Tony Stewart	Stewart–Haas Racing	Chevrolet	190	11
35	1	Jamie McMurray	Chip Ganassi Racing	Chevrolet	189	10
36	27	Paul Menard	Richard Childress Racing	Chevrolet	188	8
37	7	Michael Annett (R)	Tommy Baldwin Racing	Chevrolet	187	7
38	49	Mike Wallace	Identity Ventures Racing	Toyota	186	0
39	43	Aric Almirola	Richard Petty Motorsports	Ford	166	5
40	18	Kyle Busch	Joe Gibbs Racing	Toyota	145	4
41	95	Michael McDowell	Leavine Family Racing	Ford	127	3
42	83	J. J. Yeley	BK Racing	Toyota	102	0
43	23	Alex Bowman (R)	BK Racing	Toyota	102	1

=== Race statistics ===
- 38 lead changes among different drivers
- 6 cautions for 25 laps
- Time of race: 3:13:09
- Brad Keselowski won his sixth race in 2014

=== Standings after the race ===
Drivers' Championship standings

	Pos	Driver	Points
	1	Joey Logano	4,000
1	2	Kevin Harvick	4,000 (-0)
1	3	Ryan Newman	4,000 (-0)
3	4	Denny Hamlin	4,000 (-0)
4	5	Matt Kenseth	4,000 (-0)
1	6	Carl Edwards	4,000 (-0)
1	7	Jeff Gordon	4,000 (-0)
2	8	Brad Keselowski	4,000 (-0)
7	9	Kyle Busch	2,197 (-1,803)
1	10	Jimmie Johnson	2,174 (-1,826)
3	11	Kasey Kahne	2,169 (-1,831)
1	12	A. J. Allmendinger	2,163 (-1,837)
1	13	Dale Earnhardt Jr.	2,149 (-1,851)
	14	Greg Biffle	2,147 (-1,853)
	15	Kurt Busch	2,146 (-1,854)
	16	Aric Almirola	2,101 (-1,899)

Manufacturers' Championship standings

Pos	Manufacturer	Points
1	Chevrolet	1,429
2	Ford	1,408 (-21)
3	Toyota	1,286 (-143)

- Note: Only the first sixteen positions are included for the driver standings.

=== Notes ===
Previous race: 2014 Bank of America 500	Sprint Cup Series; 2014 season	Next race: 2014 Goody's Headache Relief Shot 500
