= 2015 Coca-Cola 600 =

Race details
- Race 12 of 36 in the 2015 NASCAR Sprint Cup Series
- The 2015 Coca-Cola 600 program cover, featuring the Coca-Cola Racing Family. Artwork by Sam Bass. The painting is called "Top Stars!"
- Date: May 24, 2015
- Location: Charlotte Motor Speedway in Concord, North Carolina
- Course: Permanent racing facility
- Course length: 1.5 miles (2.4 km)
- Distance: 400 laps, 600 mi (960 km)
- Weather: Mostly sunny with a temperature of 81 °F (27 °C); wind out of the south/southeast at 7 mph (11 km/h)
- Average speed: 147.803 mph (237.866 km/h)

Pole position
Driver	Matt Kenseth	Joe Gibbs Racing
- Time: 27.799

Most laps led
Driver	Martin Truex Jr.	Furniture Row Racing
- Laps: 131

Winner
No. 19	Carl Edwards	Joe Gibbs Racing

Television in the United States
- Network: Fox
- Announcers: Mike Joy, Larry McReynolds and Darrell Waltrip
- Nielsen ratings: 3.6/7 (Overnight); 3.8/8 (Final); 6.41 Million viewers

Radio in the United States
- Radio: PRN
- Booth announcers: Doug Rice, Mark Garrow and Brendan Gaughan
- Turn announcers: Rob Albright (1 & 2) and Brad Gillie (3 & 4)

The 2015 Coca-Cola 600, the 56th running of the event, was a NASCAR Sprint Cup Series race held on May 24, 2015, at Charlotte Motor Speedway in Concord, North Carolina. Contested over 400 laps on the 1.5 mile (2.42 km) asphalt speedway. It was the 12th race of the 2015 NASCAR Sprint Cup season. Carl Edwards won the race, his first of the season and first with Joe Gibbs Racing. Greg Biffle finished second. Dale Earnhardt Jr. finished third. Matt Kenseth and Martin Truex Jr. rounded out the top five.

Matt Kenseth won the pole for the race and led 26 laps on his way to a fourth-place finish. Martin Truex Jr. led the most laps for the second consecutive race with a race high of 131 laps on his way to a fifth-place finish. The race had 22 lead changes among nine different drivers, as well as eight caution flag periods for 39 laps.

This was the 24th career victory for Carl Edwards, first at Charlotte Motor Speedway and fifth at the track for Joe Gibbs Racing. This win moved Edwards up to 16th in the points standings. Despite being the winning manufacturer, Toyota left Charlotte trailing Chevrolet by 71 points in the manufacturer standings.

A commemorative pin for the 2015 Coca-Cola 600.

The Coca-Cola 600 was aired by Fox Sports on its broadcast Fox network for the American television audience. The radio broadcast for the race was carried by the Performance Racing Network and Sirius XM NASCAR Radio.

This was also Kyle Busch's first race back in the 18 after his injury at the Daytona Xfinity race.

== Report ==
=== Background ===
Charlotte Motor Speedway, the track where the race was held.

Charlotte Motor Speedway is a motorsports complex located in Concord, North Carolina, United States 13 miles from Charlotte, North Carolina. The complex features a 1.5 miles (2.4 km) quad oval track that hosts NASCAR racing including the prestigious Coca-Cola 600 on Memorial Day weekend and the Sprint All-Star Race, as well as the Bank of America 500. The speedway was built in 1959 by Bruton Smith and is considered the home track for NASCAR with many race teams located in the Charlotte area. The track is owned and operated by Speedway Motorsports Inc. (SMI) with Marcus G. Smith (son of Bruton Smith) as track president.

The 2,000 acres (810 ha) complex also features a state-of-the-art quarter mile (0.40 km) drag racing strip, ZMAX Dragway. It is the only all-concrete, four-lane drag strip in the United States and hosts NHRA events. Alongside the drag strip is a state-of-the-art clay oval that hosts dirt racing including the World of Outlaws finals among other popular racing events.

Kevin Harvick entered Charlotte with a 46-point lead over Martin Truex Jr. following his runner-up finish. Jimmie Johnson entered 48 back following winning at Kansas Speedway. Joey Logano entered 62 back. Dale Earnhardt Jr. entered 77 back following a third-place finish at Kansas.

For the weekend's race, the names on the windshield of the cars — in lieu of the drivers last names — had the names of United States Armed Forces members who were killed in action. “The NASCAR community rallying to honor the U.S. Armed Forces, past and present, has long been part of our sport’s heritage,” said Brent Dewar, NASCAR chief operating officer.

==== Entry list ====
The entry list for the Coca-Cola 600 was released on Monday, May 18 at 3:41 p.m. Eastern time. Forty-eight drivers were entered for the race. Kyle Busch, who has missed the first eleven races of the season following being injured in an Xfinity Series race at Daytona International Speedway, made his first Sprint Cup Series start since the 2014 Ford EcoBoost 400 at Homestead-Miami Speedway. Ryan Blaney made his first start since the 2015 GEICO 500 at Talladega Superspeedway in the No. 21 Wood Brothers Racing Ford. Jeff Gordon, whose first career win came in the 1994 Coca-Cola 600, made his 23rd and final Coca-Cola 600 start. Chase Elliott attempted and made his third career start in the No. 25 Hendrick Motorsports Chevrolet. Jeff Green attempted to make the race in the No. 30 Chevrolet for The Motorsports Group which hadn't been entered in a race since the 2015 Toyota Owners 400 at Richmond International Raceway. Mike Bliss returned to the seat of the No. 32 Go FAS Racing Ford that was las driven by Joey Gase in the 2015 SpongeBob SquarePants 400 at Kansas Speedway. Alex Kennedy drove the No. 33 Hillman-Circle Sport LLC Chevrolet that had been driven by Ty Dillon the previous week at Kansas. Travis Kvapil attempted to make his first start of the season in the No. 39 Hillman-Circle Sport LLC Chevrolet.

No.	Driver	Team	Manufacturer	Starts	Best Finish
1	Jamie McMurray	Chip Ganassi Racing	Chevrolet	12	2nd
2	Brad Keselowski (PC3)	Team Penske	Ford	5	5th
3	Austin Dillon	Richard Childress Racing	Chevrolet	1	16th
4	Kevin Harvick (PC1)	Stewart–Haas Racing	Chevrolet	14	1st
5	Kasey Kahne	Hendrick Motorsports	Chevrolet	11	1st
6	Trevor Bayne	Roush Fenway Racing	Ford	3	16th
7	Alex Bowman	Tommy Baldwin Racing	Chevrolet	1	33rd
9	Sam Hornish Jr.	Richard Petty Motorsports	Ford	2	13th
10	Danica Patrick	Stewart–Haas Racing	Chevrolet	3	29th
11	Denny Hamlin	Joe Gibbs Racing	Toyota	9	2nd
13	Casey Mears	Germain Racing	Chevrolet	12	1st
14	Tony Stewart (PC4)	Stewart–Haas Racing	Chevrolet	16	2nd
15	Clint Bowyer	Michael Waltrip Racing	Toyota	9	7th
16	Greg Biffle	Roush Fenway Racing	Ford	12	2nd
17	Ricky Stenhouse Jr.	Roush Fenway Racing	Ford	3	11th
18	Kyle Busch	Joe Gibbs Racing	Toyota	11	3rd
19	Carl Edwards	Joe Gibbs Racing	Toyota	10	3rd
20	Matt Kenseth (PC6)	Joe Gibbs Racing	Ford	15	1st
21	Ryan Blaney (i)	Wood Brothers Racing	Ford	0	—
22	Joey Logano	Team Penske	Ford	6	3rd
23	J. J. Yeley (i)	BK Racing	Toyota	6	2nd
24	Jeff Gordon (PC7)	Hendrick Motorsports	Chevrolet	22	1st
25	Chase Elliott (i)	Hendrick Motorsports	Chevrolet	0	-
26	Jeb Burton (R)	BK Racing	Toyota	0	—
27	Paul Menard	Richard Childress Racing	Chevrolet	8	8th
30	Jeff Green (i)	The Motorsports Group	Chevrolet	7	11th
31	Ryan Newman	Richard Childress Racing	Chevrolet	14	2nd
32	Mike Bliss (i)	Go FAS Racing	Ford	4	15th
33	Alex Kennedy (R)	Hillman-Circle Sport LLC	Chevrolet	0	—
34	Brett Moffitt (R)	Front Row Motorsports	Ford	0	—
35	Cole Whitt	Front Row Motorsports	Ford	2	27th
38	David Gilliland	Front Row Motorsports	Ford	8	20th
39	Travis Kvapil (i)	Hillman-Circle Sport LLC	Chevrolet	7	22nd
40	Landon Cassill (i)	Hillman-Circle Sport LLC	Chevrolet	4	18th
41	Kurt Busch (PC5)	Stewart–Haas Racing	Chevrolet	14	1st
42	Kyle Larson	Chip Ganassi Racing	Chevrolet	1	18th
43	Aric Almirola	Richard Petty Motorsports	Ford	3	11th
46	Michael Annett	HScott Motorsports	Chevrolet	1	28th
47	A. J. Allmendinger	JTG Daugherty Racing	Chevrolet	7	5th
48	Jimmie Johnson (PC2)	Hendrick Motorsports	Chevrolet	13	1st
51	Justin Allgaier	HScott Motorsports	Chevrolet	1	37th
55	David Ragan	Michael Waltrip Racing	Toyota	8	2nd
62	Brendan Gaughan (i)	Premium Motorsports	Chevrolet	1	33rd
78	Martin Truex Jr.	Furniture Row Racing	Chevrolet	10	7th
83	Matt DiBenedetto (R)	BK Racing	Toyota	0	—
88	Dale Earnhardt Jr.	Hendrick Motorsports	Chevrolet	16	4th
95	Michael McDowell	Leavine Family Racing	Ford	6	30th
98	Josh Wise	Phil Parsons Racing	Ford	3	26th
Official entry list

Key	Meaning
(R)	Rookie
(i)	Ineligible for points
(PC#)	Past champions provisional

== Practice ==
=== First practice ===
Carl Edwards was the fastest in the first practice session with a time of 28.085 and a speed of 192.273 mph (309.433 km/h).

Pos	No.	Driver	Team	Manufacturer	Time	Speed
1	19	Carl Edwards	Joe Gibbs Racing	Toyota	28.085	192.273
2	48	Jimmie Johnson	Hendrick Motorsports	Chevrolet	28.173	191.673
3	5	Kasey Kahne	Hendrick Motorsports	Chevrolet	28.178	191.639
Official first practice results

== Qualifying ==
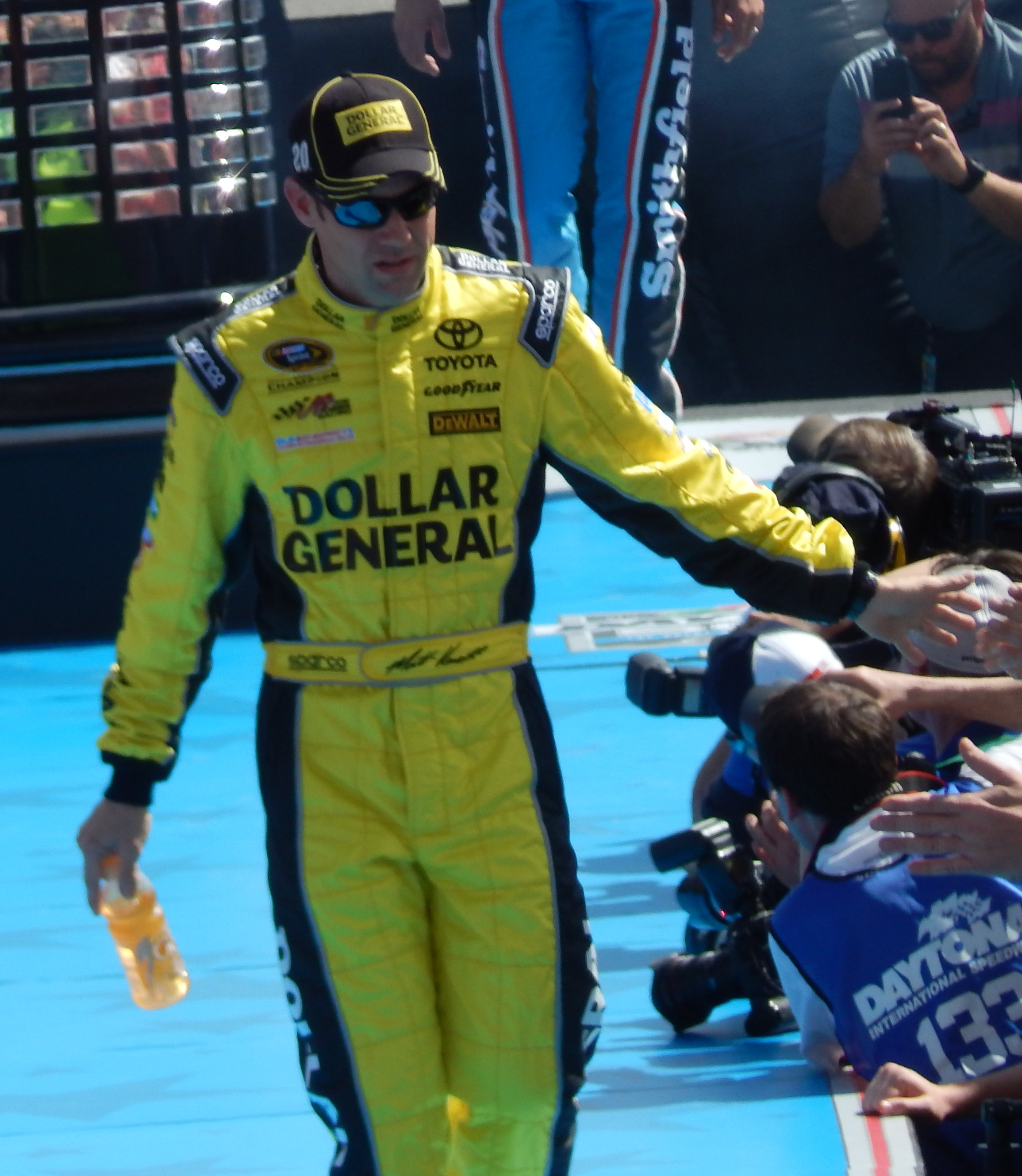
Matt Kenseth, seen here at the 2015 Daytona 500, scored the pole for the race.

Matt Kenseth won the pole with a time of 27.799 seconds and a speed of 194.252 mph (312.618 km/h). “I thought we had some speed in practice, just never really had the balance or the perfect lap,” he said. “Everyone at JGR has been working honestly around the clock to get all these cars done and get us better stuff. It's one lap. It's 600 miles Sunday, but it's a good place to start. A good way to start the weekend." “Second is nice, but look at the difference and how much I needed to pick up,” said Joey Logano. “That was a very fast lap by the 20, congratulations to them. I don’t know how to go that fast. We’ve got a couple weeks to figure out how to beat the 20 car. He’s very, very fast obviously. That was an amazing lap they ran there at the end.” “Just trying to have confidence,” Greg Biffle said after qualifying fourth. “We haven’t seen it in race trim yet, whether it’s us taking the tape off the front of it or what it might be – the change between our qualifying and race trim. We’re struggling a bit right now, so we’re just gonna work hard in practice and see what we can do.” None of the five Hendrick Motorsports drivers made it to the final round of qualifying for the first time since Sonoma last June. "I'm just disappointed in that second run out," said Gordon, who would start 18th. "The car never got down to the white line. It was real tight." Mike Bliss, Jeb Burton, Brendan Gaughan, Jeff Green and Travis Kvapil all failed to make the race.

=== Qualifying results ===
Pos	No.	Driver	Team	Manufacturer	R1	R2	R3
1	20	Matt Kenseth	Joe Gibbs Racing	Toyota	27.913	27.869	27.799
2	22	Joey Logano	Team Penske	Ford	28.281	28.074	28.003
3	19	Carl Edwards	Joe Gibbs Racing	Toyota	28.116	27.954	28.018
4	16	Greg Biffle	Roush Fenway Racing	Ford	28.131	28.080	28.092
5	11	Denny Hamlin	Joe Gibbs Racing	Toyota	28.175	28.070	28.124
6	2	Brad Keselowski	Team Penske	Ford	28.000	28.088	28.142
7	55	David Ragan	Michael Waltrip Racing	Toyota	27.993	27.975	28.180
8	4	Kevin Harvick	Stewart–Haas Racing	Chevrolet	27.962	27.861	28.232
9	42	Kyle Larson	Chip Ganassi Racing	Chevrolet	28.157	28.117	28.233
10	78	Martin Truex Jr.	Furniture Row Racing	Chevrolet	28.178	28.063	28.373
11	3	Austin Dillon	Richard Childress Racing	Chevrolet	28.240	28.104	28.446
12	14	Tony Stewart	Stewart–Haas Racing	Chevrolet	28.045	27.932	29.124
13	48	Jimmie Johnson	Hendrick Motorsports	Chevrolet	28.257	28.165	—
14	41	Kurt Busch	Stewart–Haas Racing	Chevrolet	28.131	28.167	—
15	88	Dale Earnhardt Jr.	Hendrick Motorsports	Chevrolet	28.205	28.171	—
16	21	Ryan Blaney (i)	Wood Brothers Racing	Ford	28.183	28.174	—
17	18	Kyle Busch	Joe Gibbs Racing	Toyota	28.076	28.209	—
18	24	Jeff Gordon	Hendrick Motorsports	Chevrolet	27.994	28.220	—
19	31	Ryan Newman	Richard Childress Racing	Chevrolet	28.207	28.250	—
20	10	Danica Patrick	Stewart–Haas Racing	Chevrolet	28.249	28.279	—
21	43	Aric Almirola	Richard Petty Motorsports	Ford	28.290	28.298	—
22	1	Jamie McMurray	Chip Ganassi Racing	Chevrolet	28.116	28.332	—
23	27	Paul Menard	Richard Childress Racing	Chevrolet	28.269	28.424	—
24	15	Clint Bowyer	Michael Waltrip Racing	Toyota	28.293	29.394	—
25	95	Michael McDowell	Leavine Family Racing	Ford	28.301	—	—
26	9	Sam Hornish Jr.	Richard Petty Motorsports	Ford	28.305	—	—
27	6	Trevor Bayne	Roush Fenway Racing	Ford	28.332	—	—
28	25	Chase Elliott (i)	Hendrick Motorsports	Chevrolet	28.365	—	—
29	17	Ricky Stenhouse Jr.	Roush Fenway Racing	Ford	28.394	—	—
30	47	A. J. Allmendinger	JTG Daugherty Racing	Chevrolet	28.429	—	—
31	7	Alex Bowman	Tommy Baldwin Racing	Chevrolet	28.439	—	—
32	40	Landon Cassill (i)	Hillman-Circle Sport LLC	Chevrolet	28.444	—	—
33	5	Kasey Kahne	Hendrick Motorsports	Chevrolet	28.470	—	—
34	13	Casey Mears	Germain Racing	Chevrolet	28.528	—	—
35	51	Justin Allgaier	HScott Motorsports	Chevrolet	28.538	—	—
36	46	Michael Annett	HScott Motorsports	Chevrolet	28.564	—	—
37	35	Cole Whitt	Front Row Motorsports	Ford	28.590	—	—
38	98	Josh Wise	Phil Parsons Racing	Ford	28.651	—	—
39	38	David Gilliland	Front Row Motorsports	Ford	28.724	—	—
40	34	Brett Moffitt (R)	Front Row Motorsports	Ford	29.060	—	—
41	23	J. J. Yeley (i)	BK Racing	Toyota	29.078	—	—
42	83	Matt DiBenedetto (R)	BK Racing	Toyota	29.184	—	—
43	33	Alex Kennedy (R)	Hillman-Circle Sport LLC	Chevrolet	29.746	—	—
Failed to qualify
44	26	Jeb Burton (R)	BK Racing	Toyota	28.679	—	—
45	32	Mike Bliss (i)	Go FAS Racing	Ford	28.894	—	—
46	39	Travis Kvapil (i)	Hillman-Circle Sport LLC	Chevrolet	28.984	—	—
47	30	Jeff Green (i)	The Motorsports Group	Chevrolet	29.337	—	—
48	62	Brendan Gaughan (i)	Premium Motorsports	Chevrolet	29.807	—	—
Official qualifying results

== Practice (post-qualifying) ==
=== Second practice ===
Kurt Busch was the fastest in the second practice session with a time of 28.031 and a speed of 192.664 mph (310.063 km/h).

Pos	No.	Driver	Team	Manufacturer	Time	Speed
1	41	Kurt Busch	Stewart–Haas Racing	Chevrolet	28.031	192.664
2	20	Matt Kenseth	Joe Gibbs Racing	Toyota	28.172	191.680
3	48	Jimmie Johnson	Hendrick Motorsports	Chevrolet	28.300	190.813
Official second practice results

=== Final practice ===
Kurt Busch was the fastest in the final practice session with a time of 28.624 and a speed of 188.653 mph (303.608 km/h).

Pos	No.	Driver	Team	Manufacturer	Time	Speed
1	41	Kurt Busch	Stewart–Haas Racing	Chevrolet	28.624	188.653
2	5	Kasey Kahne	Hendrick Motorsports	Chevrolet	28.869	187.052
3	27	Paul Menard	Richard Childress Racing	Chevrolet	28.879	186.987
Official final practice results

== Race ==
=== First half ===
==== Start ====
The Coca-Cola 600 was scheduled to start at 6:20 p.m. but started one minute late with Matt Kenseth leading the field to the green flag. Kenseth wouldn't lead the first lap however, as teammate Carl Edwards took the lead. Kenseth found his way to the head of the field on lap 4. The first caution flew on lap 26. This was a scheduled competition caution that came after Charlotte Motor Speedway general manager Marcus Smith had turns 1 and 2 washed down overnight. Brad Keselowski was tagged for removing equipment from his pit box and restarted from the tail-end of the field. Aric Almirola was tagged for his crew being over the wall too soon and also restarted from the tail-end of the field.

The race restarted on lap 31 and Joey Logano shot out ahead of Kenseth to take the lead on lap 32. Denny Hamlin powered to the outside of Logano in turn 2 to take the lead on lap 44. Kevin Harvick took the lead on lap 65. As a round of green flag pit stops began, he surrendered the lead on lap 79 to make his pit stop and gave it to teammate Kurt Busch, who also was on pit road. This gave the lead to Keselowski, who pitted on lap 81 and gave the lead back to Harvick. The second caution flew on lap 90 when Jimmie Johnson got loose in turn 3 and spun out off the asphalt banking in turn 4. He saved the car and brought it to pit road. Keselowski chose not to pit and assumed the lead.

==== Second quarter ====
The race restarted on lap 95. Keselowski was no match for his teammate on fresher tires as Logano took the lead on lap 96. Kurt Busch, who took four tires during the previous caution, took the lead with ease on lap 98. The third caution flew on lap 136 when Justin Allgaier slammed the wall in turn 3.

The race restarted on lap 142, with Kurt Busch still out in front. The race settled into a green flag run. A second series of green flag pit stops began on lap 185, 15 laps to halfway. Busch surrendered the lead to pit on lap 190 and handed the lead to Johnson. He pitted on lap 191 and handed the lead to Edwards. He pitted the next lap and the lead cycled to Martin Truex Jr. Kasey Kahne was tagged for speeding on pit road and was forced to serve a drive-through penalty.

=== Second half ===
==== Halfway ====
The fourth caution flew on lap 229 when Trevor Bayne collected the wall in turn 3, leaving debris on the racetrack. Ryan Newman was tagged for speeding on pit road and restarted from the tail-end of the field.

The race restarted on lap 236. Kurt Busch took back the lead on lap 238. Truex took back the lead on lap 263. The fifth caution flew on lap 273 when Johnson hit the wall near the entrance to pit road. “We had a really loose racecar," Johnson explained. "We came in with an aggressive mindset to bring an aggressive setup in the car, drive aggressively and take chances. We don’t have anything to lose. Unfortunately, we didn’t get long enough into the race for the aggressive setup to come into play. Another 30/40 laps, we would have had the car right where we wanted it. I just didn’t make it there." "I could see it, I could see that opening and I could see the No. 2 (Brad Keselowski) pit," Johnson said. "I was frightened that I was going to get through that hole. It wouldn’t have been pretty for me, but to have teams and stuff there ... that was something I was staring at sliding for a long way. I was very thankful the SAFER barrier was there. I wish we could find a way to extend a wall out and redirect the car away from that opening, or close that opening up."

The race restarted on lap 279. The sixth caution of the race flew on lap 282 when Ryan Blaney hit the wall.

==== Fourth quarter ====
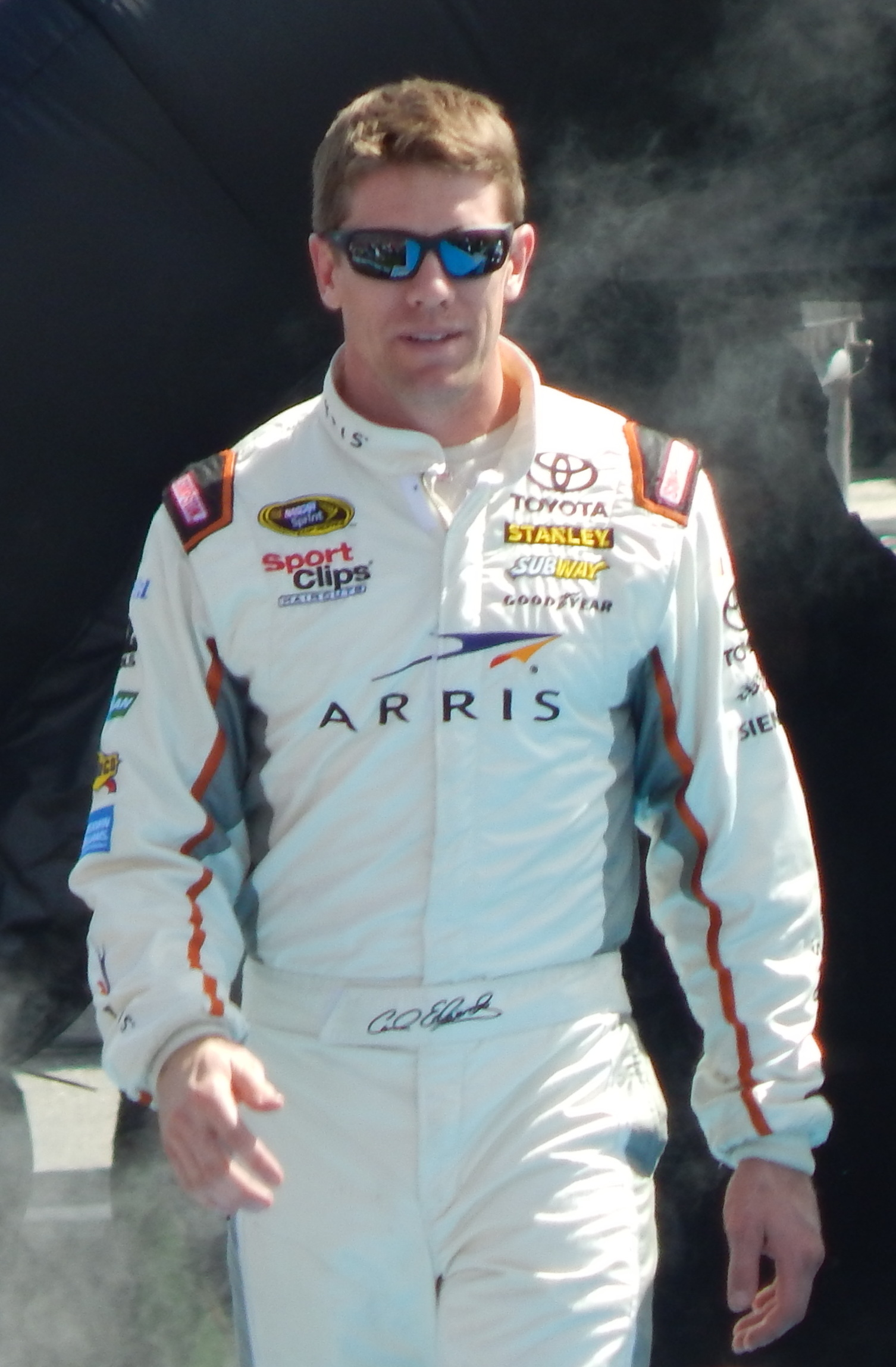
Carl Edwards, seen here at the 2015 Daytona 500, scored his first win of the season.

The race restarted on lap 292. The seventh caution of the race flew on lap 327 when Michael Annett, exiting turn 2, got loose and spun out on the backstretch.

The race restarted on lap 333. Hamlin took the lead from Truex Jr. with 67 laps to go. The eighth caution of the race flew with 64 laps to go when Ricky Stenhouse Jr. hit the wall in turn 4, leaving debris on the racetrack.

The race restarted with 59 laps to go. Hamlin made an unscheduled stop with 38 laps to go for a loose wheel. Martin Truex Jr. reassumed the lead. He pitted with 22 laps to go and handed the lead to Harvick. He pitted the next lap and gave the lead to Edwards who drove his way to score the win.

== Post-race ==
=== Driver comments ===
"JGR is back and so is Toyota," said Edwards, who pitted on Lap 338 for fuel and was able to stretch it all the way to the finish as others ran out in the closing laps. "Darian Grubb is so good as a crew chief and when it comes down to fuel mileage, there isn’t anyone else I’d want calling the shots like he did tonight. This is such a huge win." "I was hoping the guys in front of me would run too hard and run out of gas," said Earnhardt. "We had to try to go for a win. We didn’t have a car fast enough to beat the '41' (Kurt Busch) or the '78' (Truex). We had to do something different. I like to gamble." Martin Truex Jr. finished fifth after leading a race high 131 laps. "I didn't even think fuel mileage strategy was an option," said Truex, who also led the most laps in the previous race at Kansas Speedway. "I felt I only needed to pass the No. 11 (Hamlin). We had a very fast car all night. It really hurts knowing that you had the fastest car and didn't win. I don’t know what to do about fuel mileage races. I’ve never ever in my entire career come out on the right end of them." "We didn't make many adjustments throughout the race, the car was fast from the get-go," noted Truex. "Whatever we needed to do, Cole (Pearn, crew chief) and his engineering staff made the right calls. This is a talented team that works extremely hard and I want nothing more than to drive their car to victory lane."

In his first Cup Series points race since his injury, Kyle Busch finished eleventh. He was able to run the whole race, but in the event he couldn't finish, Joe Gibbs racing had Erik Jones ready to complete the race.

=== Post-race penalties ===
On the Wednesday following the race, NASCAR handed out penalties to three Sprint Cup teams.

- The No. 1 Chip Ganassi Racing Chevrolet team was penalized for modifying the right rear quarter panel wheel opening after qualifying inspection. The penalty is a P2 penalty that violates the following sections of the 2015 NASCAR rules:

- 12.1: Actions detrimental to stock car racing.
- 20.4.b: Body; All approved OEM-manufactured body components must be used as supplied except as required to stiffen, or to attach to other vehicle components. Tolerances from CAD surfaces and template tolerances are provided to allow for manufacturing, fabrication, and installation variability. Approved Parts: GM R: NSCS 0786. Part Name: Quarter Panel RS, Effective date Aug. 1, 2012.
- 20.4.2: Surface Conformance (a). Coordinate measuring machines, scanning equipment, and templates, among other tools, will be used to inspect body surfaces for conformance to the approved OEM and NASCAR CAD files.

As a result of the violations, crew chief Matt McCall was placed on probation through the remainder of the 2015 calendar year.

- The other two teams – the No. 48 Hendrick Motorsports Chevrolet and the No. 51 HScott Motorsports Chevrolet – were assessed P1 penalties for receiving written warnings for consecutive events. Both cars failed to pass qualifying tech inspection on the first attempt two consecutive weeks.
- Per Section 12.5.3.1 of the NASCAR rule book:

- Warnings and P1 penalty options: b. Multiple warnings issued to the same member or team will result in one or more P1 penalties; c. If the same team receives two warnings during the same event or two warnings during two consecutive events, whether the events are championship or non-championship, then this may result in one or more ... P1 penalties at NASCAR's discretion.

As a result of these infractions, both teams received the last two choices in the pit stall selections, respective to qualifying results, for the following weekend's event at Dover International Speedway.

== Race results ==
Pos	No.	Driver	Team	Manufacturer	Laps	Points
1	19	Carl Edwards	Joe Gibbs Racing	Toyota	400	47
2	16	Greg Biffle	Roush Fenway Racing	Ford	400	42
3	88	Dale Earnhardt Jr.	Hendrick Motorsports	Chevrolet	400	41
4	20	Matt Kenseth	Joe Gibbs Racing	Toyota	400	41
5	78	Martin Truex Jr.	Furniture Row Racing	Chevrolet	400	41
6	31	Ryan Newman	Richard Childress Racing	Chevrolet	400	38
7	2	Brad Keselowski	Team Penske	Ford	400	38
8	11	Denny Hamlin	Joe Gibbs Racing	Toyota	400	37
9	4	Kevin Harvick	Stewart–Haas Racing	Chevrolet	400	36
10	41	Kurt Busch	Stewart–Haas Racing	Chevrolet	400	35
11	18	Kyle Busch	Joe Gibbs Racing	Toyota	400	33
12	5	Kasey Kahne	Hendrick Motorsports	Chevrolet	400	32
13	22	Joey Logano	Team Penske	Ford	400	32
14	27	Paul Menard	Richard Childress Racing	Chevrolet	400	30
15	24	Jeff Gordon	Hendrick Motorsports	Chevrolet	400	29
16	3	Austin Dillon	Richard Childress Racing	Chevrolet	400	28
17	43	Aric Almirola	Richard Petty Motorsports	Ford	399	27
18	25	Chase Elliott (i)	Hendrick Motorsports	Chevrolet	399	0
19	1	Jamie McMurray	Chip Ganassi Racing	Chevrolet	399	25
20	15	Clint Bowyer	Michael Waltrip Racing	Toyota	399	24
21	14	Tony Stewart	Stewart–Haas Racing	Chevrolet	399	23
22	10	Danica Patrick	Stewart–Haas Racing	Chevrolet	398	22
23	13	Casey Mears	Germain Racing	Chevrolet	398	21
24	9	Sam Hornish Jr.	Richard Petty Motorsports	Ford	398	20
25	42	Kyle Larson	Chip Ganassi Racing	Chevrolet	398	19
26	7	Alex Bowman	Tommy Baldwin Racing	Chevrolet	397	18
27	6	Trevor Bayne	Roush Fenway Racing	Ford	397	17
28	35	Cole Whitt	Front Row Motorsports	Ford	396	16
29	47	A. J. Allmendinger	JTG Daugherty Racing	Chevrolet	395	15
30	95	Michael McDowell	Leavine Family Racing	Ford	394	14
31	34	Brett Moffitt (R)	Front Row Motorsports	Ford	393	13
32	46	Michael Annett	HScott Motorsports	Chevrolet	393	12
33	38	David Gilliland	Front Row Motorsports	Ford	392	12
34	83	Matt DiBenedetto (R)	BK Racing	Toyota	392	10
35	98	Josh Wise	Phil Parsons Racing	Ford	392	9
36	33	Alex Kennedy (R)	Hillman-Circle Sport LLC	Chevrolet	389	8
37	17	Ricky Stenhouse Jr.	Roush Fenway Racing	Ford	382	7
38	23	J. J. Yeley (i)	BK Racing	Toyota	377	0
39	40	Landon Cassill (i)	Hillman-Circle Sport LLC	Chevrolet	375	0
40	48	Jimmie Johnson	Hendrick Motorsports	Chevrolet	370	4
41	55	David Ragan	Michael Waltrip Racing	Toyota	353	3
42	21	Ryan Blaney (i)	Wood Brothers Racing	Ford	281	0
43	51	Justin Allgaier	HScott Motorsports	Chevrolet	135	1
Official Coca-Cola 600 race results

=== Race statistics ===
- 22 lead changes among 9 different drivers
- 8 cautions for 39 laps
- Time of race: 4 hours, 3 minutes, 34 seconds
- Average speed: 147.803 mph (237.866 km/h)
- Carl Edwards took home $363,390 in winnings

Lap Leaders
Laps	Leader
1-2	Carl Edwards
3-27	Matt Kenseth
28	David Gilliland
29	Matt Kenseth
30-43	Joey Logano
44-63	Denny Hamlin
64-78	Kevin Harvick
79	Kurt Busch
80	Brad Keselowski
81-90	Kevin Harvick
91	Martin Truex Jr.
92-93	Brad Keselowski
94-96	Joey Logano
97-189	Kurt Busch
190-191	Carl Edwards
192-236	Martin Truex Jr.
237-260	Kurt Busch
261-329	Martin Truex Jr.
330-362	Denny Hamlin
363-378	Martin Truex Jr.
379	Kevin Harvick
380-400	Carl Edwards

Total laps led
Leader	Laps
Martin Truex Jr.	131
Kurt Busch	118
Denny Hamlin	53
Matt Kenseth	26
Matt Kenseth	26
Carl Edwards	25
Joey Logano	17
Brad Keselowski	3
David Gilliland	1

==== Race awards ====
- Coors Light Pole Award: Matt Kenseth (27.799, 194.252 mph (312.618 km/h))
- 3M Lap Leader: Martin Truex Jr. (131 laps)
- American Ethanol Green Flag Restart Award: Martin Truex Jr. (30.194, 178.843 mph (287.820 km/h))
- Duralast Brakes "Bake In The Race" Award: Matt Kenseth
- Freescale "Wide Open": Matt Kenseth
- Ingersoll Rand Power Move: Dale Earnhardt Jr. (11 positions)
- MAHLE Clevite Engine Builder of the Race: Toyota Racing Development, #20
- Mobil 1 Driver of the Race: Martin Truex Jr. (132.8 driver rating)
- Moog Steering and Suspension Problem Solver of The Race: Dale Earnhardt Jr. (crew chief Greg Ives (0.160))
- NASCAR Sprint Cup Leader Bonus: No winner: rolls over to $90,000 at next event
- Sherwin-Williams Fastest Lap: Denny Hamlin (Lap 293, 28.797, 187.523 mph (301.789 km/h))
- Sunoco Rookie of The Race: Brett Moffitt

== Media ==
=== Television ===
Fox Sports covered their 15th race at Charlotte Motor Speedway. Mike Joy, former crew chief Larry McReynolds, and five-time Coca-Cola 600 winner Darrell Waltrip had the call in the booth for the race. Jamie Little, Chris Neville, Vince Welch, and Matt Yocum handled pit road for the television side.

Fox
Booth announcers	Pit reporters
Lap-by-lap: Mike Joy; Color-commentator: Larry McReynolds; Color commentator: Darrell Waltrip	Jamie Little; Chris Neville; Vince Welch; Matt Yocum

=== Radio ===
PRN had the radio call for the race, which was simulcast on Sirius XM NASCAR Radio. Doug Rice, Mark Garrow, and Brendan Gaughan called the race in the booth when the field was racing down the front stretch. Rob Albright called the race from a scaffold outside turn 2 when the field was racing through turns 1 and 2. Brad Gillie called the race from atop the turn 4 suits when the field was racing through turns 3 and 4. Brett McMillan, Jim Noble, Steve Richards, and Doug Turnbull worked pit road for PRN.

PRN
Booth announcers	Turn announcers	Pit reporters
Lead announcer: Doug Rice; Announcer: Mark Garrow; Announcer: Brendan Gaughan	Turns 1 & 2: Rob Albright; Turns 3 & 4: Brad Gillie	Brett McMillan; Jim Noble; Steve Richards; Doug Turnbull

== Standings after the race ==
Drivers' Championship standings

	Pos	Driver	Points
	1	Kevin Harvick	473
	2	Martin Truex Jr.	432 (-41)
1	3	Joey Logano	407 (-66)
1	4	Dale Earnhardt Jr.	401 (-72)
2	5	Jimmie Johnson	393 (-80)
	6	Brad Keselowski	381 (-92)
	7	Matt Kenseth	372 (-101)
	8	Jamie McMurray	353 (-120)
	9	Jeff Gordon	346 (-127)
	10	Kasey Kahne	345 (-128)
2	11	Ryan Newman	343 (-130)
1	12	Aric Almirola	339 (-134)
1	13	Paul Menard	336 (-137)
	14	Kurt Busch	327 (-146)
	15	Denny Hamlin	321 (-152)
2	16	Carl Edwards	312 (-161)

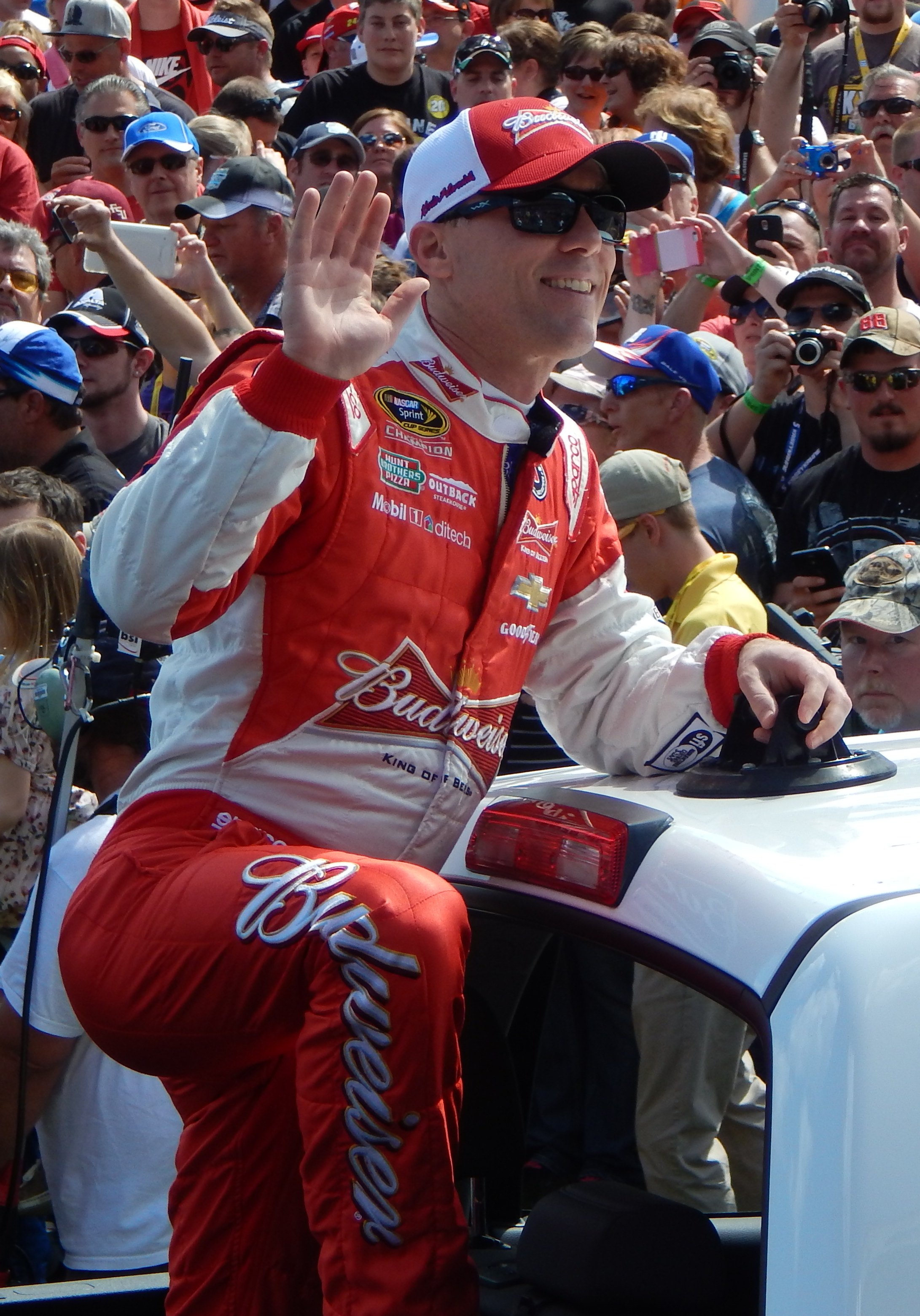
Kevin Harvick left Charlotte with a 41-point lead over Martin Truex Jr.

Manufacturers' Championship standings

Pos	Manufacturer	Points
1	Chevrolet	541
2	Ford	498 (-43)
3	Toyota	470 (-71)

- Note: Only the first sixteen positions are included for the driver standings.

Previous race: 2015 SpongeBob SquarePants 400	Sprint Cup Series; 2015 season	Next race: 2015 FedEx 400
