= 2015 SpongeBob SquarePants 400 =

Race details
- Race 11 of 36 in the 2015 NASCAR Sprint Cup Series
- The 2015 SpongeBob SquarePants 400 program cover, featuring SpongeBob SquarePants
- Date: May 9–10, 2015
- Location: Kansas Speedway in Kansas City, Kansas
- Course: Permanent racing facility
- Course length: 1.5 miles (2.4 km)
- Distance: 267 laps, 400.5 mi (644.542 km)
- Weather: Mostly cloudy with a temperature of 74 °F (23 °C); wind out of the east/southeast at 15 mph (24 km/h)
- Average speed: 125.265 mph (201.594 km/h)

Pole position
Driver	Joey Logano	Team Penske
- Time: 28.067

Most laps led
Driver	Martin Truex Jr.	Furniture Row Racing
- Laps: 95

Winner
No. 48	Jimmie Johnson	Hendrick Motorsports

Television in the United States
- Network: Fox Sports 1
- Announcers: Mike Joy, Larry McReynolds and Darrell Waltrip
- Nielsen ratings: 1.5/4 (Overnight); 1.5/4 (Final); 2.458 Million viewers

Radio in the United States
- Radio: MRN
- Booth announcers: Joe Moore, Jeff Striegle and Rusty Wallace
- Turn announcers: Dave Moody (1 & 2) and Kurt Becker (3 & 4)

The 2015 SpongeBob SquarePants 400 was a NASCAR Sprint Cup Series race held on May 9, 2015, ending shortly after midnight on May 10, 2015, at Kansas Speedway in Kansas City, Kansas. Contested over 267 laps on the 1.5 mile (2.4 km) asphalt speedway, it was the 11th race of the 2015 NASCAR Sprint Cup season. Jimmie Johnson won the race, his third of the season. Kevin Harvick finished second. Dale Earnhardt Jr. finished third. Jeff Gordon and Joey Logano rounded out the top five.

Joey Logano won the pole for the race. He led 29 laps on his way to a fifth-place finish. Martin Truex Jr. led 95 laps in the first of four straight races in which he led the most laps on his way to a ninth-place finish. The race had 16 lead changes among ten different drivers, as well as nine caution flag periods for 49 laps. There was one red flag period for two hours, 16 minutes and 30 seconds for heavy rain.

This was the 73rd career victory for Jimmie Johnson, third at Kansas Speedway and sixth at the track for Hendrick Motorsports. This win moved Johnson up to third in the points standings. Chevrolet left Kansas with a 44-point lead over Ford in the manufacturer standings.

The SpongeBob SquarePants 400 was carried by Fox Sports on the cable/satellite Fox Sports 1 network for the American television audience. The radio broadcast for the race was carried by the Motor Racing Network and Sirius XM NASCAR Radio.

== Report ==
=== Background ===
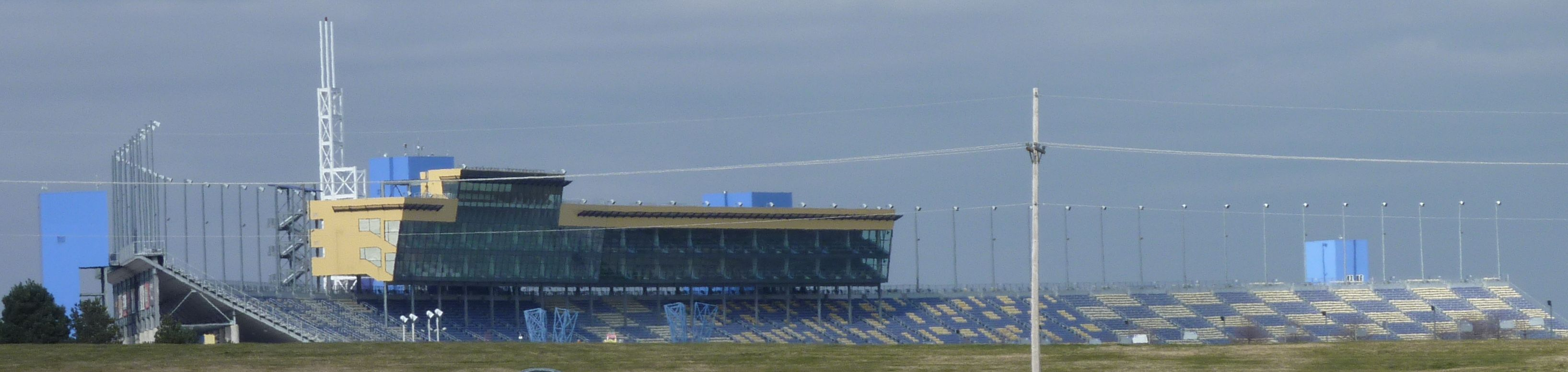
Kansas Speedway, the track where the race was held.

Kansas Speedway is a 1.5-mile (2.4 km) tri-oval race track in Kansas City, Kansas. It was built in 2001 and it currently hosts two annual NASCAR race weekends. The Verizon IndyCar Series also raced at here until 2011. The speedway is owned and operated by the International Speedway Corporation.

An advertisement for the 2015 SpongeBob SquarePants 400.

Kevin Harvick entered Kansas with a 40-point lead over Martin Truex Jr. after a fourth-place finish at Talladega. Jimmie Johnson entered 52 back following a runner-up finish the week before at Talladega. Joey Logano entered 59 back. Dale Earnhardt Jr. entered 75 back after winning the previous week at Talladega.

==== Entry list ====
The entry list for the SpongeBob SquarePants 400 was released on Monday, May 4 at 2:52 p.m. Eastern time. Forty-four cars were entered for the race. Erik Jones, who drove in relief of Denny Hamlin at the 2015 Food City 500 at Bristol Motor Speedway, made his official Sprint Cup Series debut in the No. 18 Joe Gibbs Racing Toyota. Joey Gase returned to the No. 32 Go FAS Racing Ford after Bobby Labonte drove it the previous race at Talladega Superspeedway. Ty Dillon made his first Cup start since the 2015 Daytona 500 in the No. 33 Hillman-Circle Sport LLC Chevrolet. Brett Moffitt returned to the No. 34 Front Row Motorsports Ford that he drove in Las Vegas and Phoenix. David Ragan moved to the No. 55 Michael Waltrip Racing Toyota after driving the No. 18 Toyota the last nine races.

No.	Driver	Team	Manufacturer	Sponsor
1	Jamie McMurray	Chip Ganassi Racing	Chevrolet	McDonald's
2	Brad Keselowski (PC3)	Team Penske	Ford	Avaya
3	Austin Dillon	Richard Childress Racing	Chevrolet	DOW Chemical
4	Kevin Harvick (PC1)	Stewart–Haas Racing	Chevrolet	Jimmy John's Gourmet Sandwiches
5	Kasey Kahne	Hendrick Motorsports	Chevrolet	Great Clips
6	Trevor Bayne	Roush Fenway Racing	Ford	AdvoCare
7	Alex Bowman	Tommy Baldwin Racing	Chevrolet	Accell Construction
9	Sam Hornish Jr.	Richard Petty Motorsports	Ford	Medallion Bank
10	Danica Patrick	Stewart–Haas Racing	Chevrolet	GoDaddy
11	Denny Hamlin	Joe Gibbs Racing	Toyota	FedEx Freight
13	Casey Mears	Germain Racing	Chevrolet	Squidward Tentacles
14	Tony Stewart (PC4)	Stewart–Haas Racing	Chevrolet	Bass Pro Shops, Mobil 1
15	Clint Bowyer	Michael Waltrip Racing	Toyota	5-Hour Energy
16	Greg Biffle	Roush Fenway Racing	Ford	Cheez-It, Patrick Star
17	Ricky Stenhouse Jr.	Roush Fenway Racing	Ford	Zest
18	Erik Jones (i)	Joe Gibbs Racing	Toyota	M&M's Red Nose Day
19	Carl Edwards	Joe Gibbs Racing	Toyota	Stanley Tools
20	Matt Kenseth (PC6)	Joe Gibbs Racing	Toyota	Dollar General
22	Joey Logano	Team Penske	Ford	AAA Insurance
23	J. J. Yeley (i)	BK Racing	Toyota	Dr. Pepper "I'm a Pepper"
24	Jeff Gordon (PC7)	Hendrick Motorsports	Chevrolet	American Red Cross
26	Jeb Burton (R)	BK Racing	Toyota	MAXIM Fantasy Sports App
27	Paul Menard	Richard Childress Racing	Chevrolet	Menards, Pittsburgh Paints
31	Ryan Newman	Richard Childress Racing	Chevrolet	Quicken Loans
32	Joey Gase (i)	Go FAS Racing	Ford	Tri State Tower Inc., reallycheapfloors.com
33	Ty Dillon (i)	Hillman-Circle Sport LLC	Chevrolet	Plankton
34	Brett Moffitt (R)	Front Row Motorsports	Ford	Dockside Logistics
35	Cole Whitt	Front Row Motorsports	Ford	Front Row Motorsports
38	David Gilliland	Front Row Motorsports	Ford	MDS Transport
40	Landon Cassill (i)	Hillman-Circle Sport LLC	Chevrolet	carsforsale.com
41	Kurt Busch (PC5)	Stewart–Haas Racing	Chevrolet	Haas Automation
42	Kyle Larson	Chip Ganassi Racing	Chevrolet	Target
43	Aric Almirola	Richard Petty Motorsports	Ford	Farmland
46	Michael Annett	HScott Motorsports	Chevrolet	Allstate Peterbilt Group
47	A. J. Allmendinger	JTG Daugherty Racing	Chevrolet	Kroger, Scott Products, Dillon's Food Stores
48	Jimmie Johnson (PC2)	Hendrick Motorsports	Chevrolet	Lowe's
51	Justin Allgaier	HScott Motorsports	Chevrolet	Fraternal Order of Eagles
55	David Ragan	Michael Waltrip Racing	Toyota	Aaron's Dream Machine "Own it.", SpongeBob SquarePants
62	Brendan Gaughan (i)	Premium Motorsports	Chevrolet	Premium Motorsports
78	Martin Truex Jr.	Furniture Row Racing	Chevrolet	Furniture Row, Visser Precision
83	Matt DiBenedetto (R)	BK Racing	Toyota	Dustless Blasting
88	Dale Earnhardt Jr.	Hendrick Motorsports	Chevrolet	Nationwide Insurance
95	Michael McDowell	Leavine Family Racing	Ford	WRL General Contractors, Thrivent Financial, Larry the Lobster
98	Josh Wise	Phil Parsons Racing	Ford	Phil Parsons Racing
Official initial entry list
Official final entry list

Key	Meaning
(R)	Rookie
(i)	Ineligible for points
(PC#)	Past champions provisional

== Practice ==
=== First practice ===
Kevin Harvick was the fastest in the first practice session with a time of 28.306 and a speed of 190.772 mph (307.018 km/h).

Pos	No.	Driver	Team	Manufacturer	Time	Speed
1	4	Kevin Harvick	Stewart–Haas Racing	Chevrolet	28.306	190.772
2	22	Joey Logano	Team Penske	Ford	28.365	190.375
3	19	Carl Edwards	Joe Gibbs Racing	Toyota	28.381	190.268
Official first practice results

=== Final practice ===
Erik Jones, making his official Sprint Cup Series debut, was the fastest in the final practice session with a time of 28.227 and a speed of 191.306 mph (307.877 km/h). "There's been a lot of people that have been involved over the past few weeks to get me ready for this," Jones told Fox Sports 1. "I think a lot of it was preparing mentally, watching videos, watching tape, talking to Kyle (Busch) and my teammates and just trying to get the best information I could out of everybody. It's pretty cool to be fastest in practice. I know it's only practice, but it's still pretty cool. ... There's a lot of great race car drivers. It's just really an honor to be fastest this practice."

Pos	No.	Driver	Team	Manufacturer	Time	Speed
1	18	Erik Jones (i)	Joe Gibbs Racing	Toyota	28.227	191.306
2	24	Jeff Gordon	Hendrick Motorsports	Chevrolet	28.245	191.184
3	22	Joey Logano	Team Penske	Ford	28.312	190.732
Official final practice results

== Qualifying ==
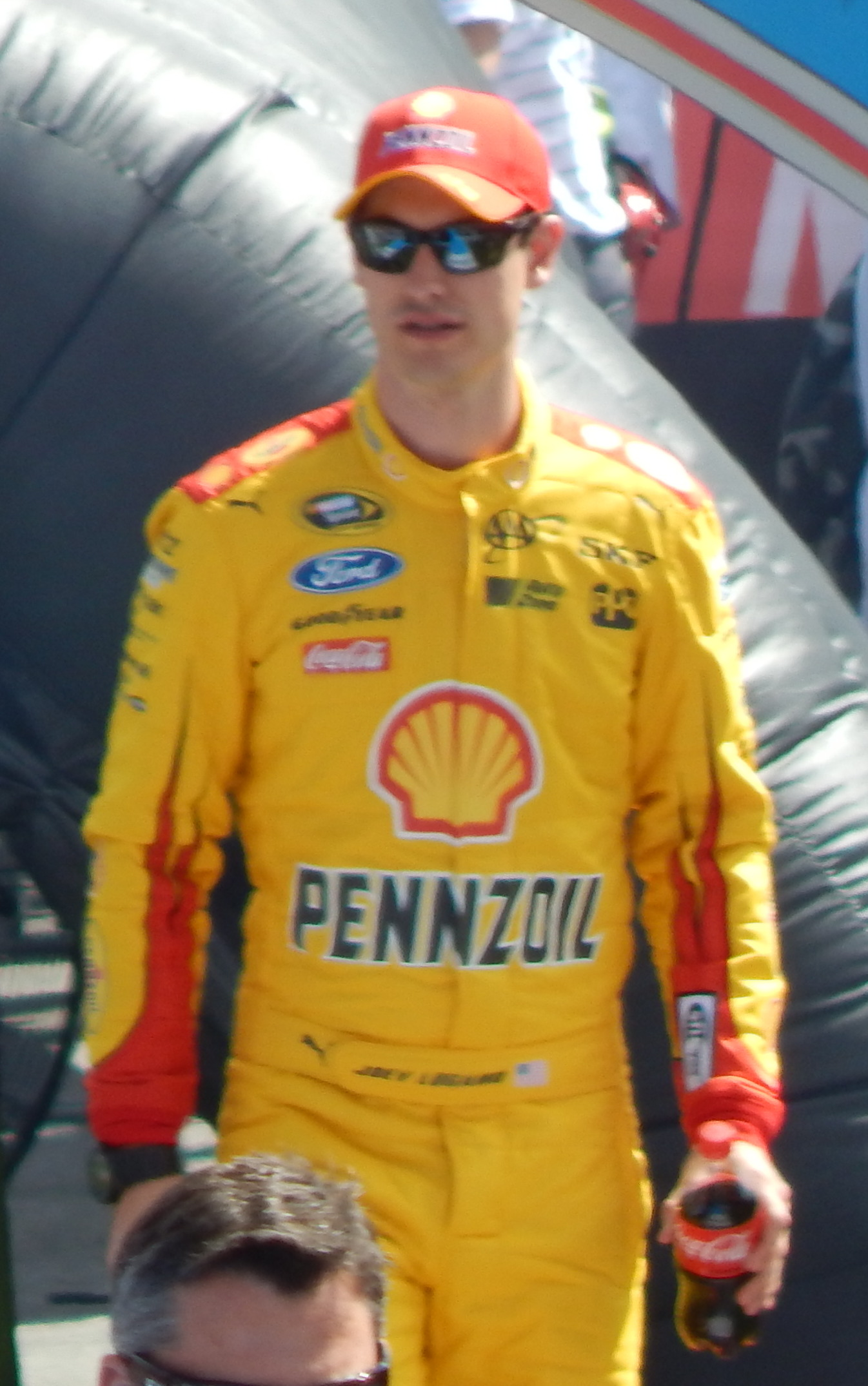
Joey Logano, seen here at the 2015 Daytona 500, won the pole for the SpongeBob SquarePants 400.

Joey Logano won the pole with a time of 28.067 and a speed of 192.397 mph (309.633 km/h). "We just kind of swung for the fence in the last round and the car drove awesome," said Logano, who won his twelfth career pole. "It's not very often you get a car that's just perfect. I came off Turn 4 and I didn't know how to go faster than that. ... It was a great run, our fourth pole of the season. We just need to rack up some more wins." "We had our best speed in our last run so that was what we were looking for," said Kasey Kahne, who turned a lap of 191.911 mph (308.851 km/h). "We've been getting better every week I think and that improvement will hopefully carry here to Kansas tomorrow night. We have a fast car and I'm excited." "I just couldn't quite find the speed in the last round," Martin Truex Jr. said. "So, the guys did a good job and we have a good starting spot for tomorrow night. This track has been good to me and hopefully we can do better than we've been doing. It's been good." "We just got a little better speed in our car and this racetrack has been pretty good for us," said Greg Biffle, who became the first Roush Fenway Racing driver to make a final round of qualifying this season. "We barely made the first round and barely made the second and then I just drove it – over drove it. I just said I was going to go for it." "It would make our life so much easier starting up front and having a good pit stall pick," Jimmie Johnson said. "Middle of the pack......we will fire our way through there and grind it out like we always do and try and I am sure get a great finish out of it. But we know we need to get better on Fridays." Brendan Gaughan failed to qualify for the race.

=== Qualifying results ===
Pos	No.	Driver	Team	Manufacturer	R1	R2	R3
1	22	Joey Logano	Team Penske	Ford	28.139	28.251	28.067
2	5	Kasey Kahne	Hendrick Motorsports	Chevrolet	28.294	28.262	28.138
3	2	Brad Keselowski	Team Penske	Ford	28.240	28.198	28.146
4	78	Martin Truex Jr.	Furniture Row Racing	Chevrolet	28.197	28.127	28.157
5	19	Carl Edwards	Joe Gibbs Racing	Toyota	28.075	28.146	28.187
6	4	Kevin Harvick	Stewart–Haas Racing	Chevrolet	28.201	28.234	28.228
7	16	Greg Biffle	Roush Fenway Racing	Ford	28.356	28.291	28.270
8	41	Kurt Busch	Stewart–Haas Racing	Chevrolet	28.262	28.296	28.294
9	1	Jamie McMurray	Chip Ganassi Racing	Chevrolet	28.149	28.218	28.387
10	42	Kyle Larson	Chip Ganassi Racing	Chevrolet	28.346	28.264	28.398
11	24	Jeff Gordon	Hendrick Motorsports	Chevrolet	28.304	28.229	28.436
12	18	Erik Jones (i)	Joe Gibbs Racing	Toyota	28.218	28.248	28.490
13	11	Denny Hamlin	Joe Gibbs Racing	Toyota	28.269	28.315	—
14	43	Aric Almirola	Richard Petty Motorsports	Ford	28.281	28.318	—
15	31	Ryan Newman	Richard Childress Racing	Chevrolet	28.359	28.338	—
16	14	Tony Stewart	Stewart–Haas Racing	Chevrolet	28.268	28.345	—
17	88	Dale Earnhardt Jr.	Hendrick Motorsports	Chevrolet	28.176	28.347	—
18	20	Matt Kenseth	Joe Gibbs Racing	Toyota	28.328	28.350	—
19	48	Jimmie Johnson	Hendrick Motorsports	Chevrolet	28.296	28.379	—
20	17	Ricky Stenhouse Jr.	Roush Fenway Racing	Ford	28.340	28.387	—
21	15	Clint Bowyer	Michael Waltrip Racing	Toyota	28.345	28.393	—
22	27	Paul Menard	Richard Childress Racing	Chevrolet	28.439	28.414	—
23	55	David Ragan	Michael Waltrip Racing	Toyota	28.445	28.457	—
24	13	Casey Mears	Germain Racing	Chevrolet	28.449	28.545	—
25	51	Justin Allgaier	HScott Motorsports	Chevrolet	28.480	—	—
26	9	Sam Hornish Jr.	Richard Petty Motorsports	Ford	28.506	—	—
27	10	Danica Patrick	Stewart–Haas Racing	Chevrolet	28.519	—	—
28	3	Austin Dillon	Richard Childress Racing	Chevrolet	28.547	—	—
29	47	A. J. Allmendinger	JTG Daugherty Racing	Chevrolet	28.584	—	—
30	6	Trevor Bayne	Roush Fenway Racing	Ford	28.586	—	—
31	95	Michael McDowell	Leavine Family Racing	Ford	28.586	—	—
32	33	Ty Dillon (i)	Hillman-Circle Sport LLC	Chevrolet	28.599	—	—
33	26	Jeb Burton (R)	BK Racing	Toyota	28.630	—	—
34	35	Cole Whitt	Front Row Motorsports	Ford	28.762	—	—
35	83	Matt DiBenedetto (R)	BK Racing	Toyota	28.774	—	—
36	7	Alex Bowman	Tommy Baldwin Racing	Chevrolet	28.791	—	—
37	23	J. J. Yeley (i)	BK Racing	Toyota	28.962	—	—
38	38	David Gilliland	Front Row Motorsports	Ford	28.971	—	—
39	34	Brett Moffitt (R)	Front Row Motorsports	Ford	28.976	—	—
40	98	Josh Wise	Phil Parsons Racing	Ford	28.994	—	—
41	40	Landon Cassill (i)	Hillman-Circle Sport LLC	Chevrolet	29.167	—	—
42	32	Joey Gase (i)	Go FAS Racing	Ford	29.181	—	—
43	46	Michael Annett	HScott Motorsports	Chevrolet	29.384	—	—
Failed to qualify
44	62	Brendan Gaughan (i)	Premium Motorsports	Chevrolet	29.358	—	—
Official qualifying results

== Race ==
=== First half ===
==== Start ====
The race was scheduled to start at 7:46 p.m., but the threat of weather moved the start time up to 7:36. The race started at 7:39 when Joey Logano led the field to the green flag. Going into turn 3, Jimmie Johnson got loose and about took out teammate Dale Earnhardt Jr. He was saved by the first caution of the race flew on lap eight for a two car wreck on the backstretch and turn 4. Exiting turn 2, Jeb Burton had a left-front flat and spun out on the backstretch, however at that point the race stayed green. Teammate J. J. Yeley spun and made contact with the wall in turn 4, which caused the caution.

The race restarted on lap 13. Alex Bowman dropped to the apron on the front stretch for electrical issues that dropped him to 42nd. The second caution of the race flew on lap 26. This was a scheduled competition caution. Most of the leaders took just two tires on this stop.

==== Threat of rain ====
The race restarted on lap 30. Kurt Busch went ahead of Logano in turn 3 and took the lead on lap 31. Teammate Kevin Harvick passed him in turn 1 to take the lead on lap 51. Martin Truex Jr. took the lead on lap 58. He hit pit road on lap 79 to pit. This handed the lead to Brad Keselowski. He just about missed pit road trying to enter and handed the lead to Matt Kenseth. He ducked onto pit road on lap 82 and handed the lead to rookie teammate Erik Jones. The lead cycled back to Martin Truex Jr. on lap 84. Michael McDowell was tagged for speeding and served a drive-through penalty.

The third caution of the race flew on lap 95 for a one car spin on the front stretch. Exiting turn 4, Jeb Burton got loose and spun down through the grass. Dale Earnhardt Jr. got back on the lead lap being the first car a lap down. Despite having just been on pit road, all of the lead lap cars pitted. Most took just two tires. Joey Logano was tagged for his crew being over the wall too soon. He was forced to restart from the tail-end of the field. Just before the race was to restart, rain started pouring and the race was red flagged on lap 99. Lightning in the area forced the spotters, camera people and fans to get to cover. The red flag lasted for two hours, 15 minutes and 30 seconds.

==== Restart ====
The drivers were called back to their cars at 10:30 p.m. The engines were re-fired at 10:58. The red flag was lifted and the cars rolled off pit road at 11:00. The race restarted on lap 108. The fourth caution of the race flew on lap 118 for a one car spin on the front stretch. Exiting turn 4, David Ragan got loose and spun through the grass. He came to a rest on the race logo in the middle of the front stretch. Brad Keselowski opted not to pit and took the lead.

The race restarted on lap 128. The fifth caution of the race flew on lap 131 for a multi-car wreck exiting turn 2. Matt Kenseth got sideways after suffering a flat left-front tire exiting 2 and was able to save it. Tony Stewart, trying to avoid Kenseth, got turned by Brett Moffitt into the wall.

=== Second half ===
==== Halfway ====
The race restarted on lap 135. Brad Keselowski surrendered the lead on lap 164 to pit and handed it to Martin Truex Jr. He ducked onto pit road on lap 176. This handed the lead to Carl Edwards. The sixth caution of the race flew on lap 184 for a single car wreck in turn 3. Going through turn 3, Clint Bowyer came down on Ricky Stenhouse Jr. and spun out. He was tagged again by Stenhouse who was trying to avoid hitting him further and spun around even more.

The race restarted with 77 laps to go. The seventh caution of the race flew for Erik Jones hitting the wall in the tri-oval. Exiting turn 4, his car got loose. He overcorrected and turned head first into the wall. Jones took the car to the garage. "I learned a lot about racing upfront and racing these guys," Jones said later on Fox Sports 1. "I just got loose off 4 and lost it. It's my fault. I'm ready to do another one. I hope we get a shot at it."

==== Fourth quarter ====
The race restarted with 67 laps to go. Denny Hamlin suffered damage on the restart and pitted to repair it. He crashed in turn 1 and brought out the eighth caution with 60 laps to go. "I think we blew a left-front tire," Hamlin told FOX Sports 1. He was unhappy with how long it took for NASCAR to throw a caution. "I blew it off of Turn 4, spun out, hit the wall at the start-finish line. I keep spinning, keep hitting the wall and I can't figure out why everyone is still coming at 200 (mph). I look and the green light is on. They didn't throw a caution until seven seconds after I wrecked. Luckily no one hit us in the door." Kyle Larson exited pit road with the lead.

The race restarted with 55 laps to go. Kevin Harvick took back the lead with 54 laps to go. The ninth caution of the race flew with twelve laps to go when Stenhouse Jr. slammed the wall in turn 2. Jimmie Johnson opted not to pit when Harvick did under caution and assumed the lead. Paul Menard was tagged for an uncontrolled tire and forced to drop to the tail-end of the field for the restart.

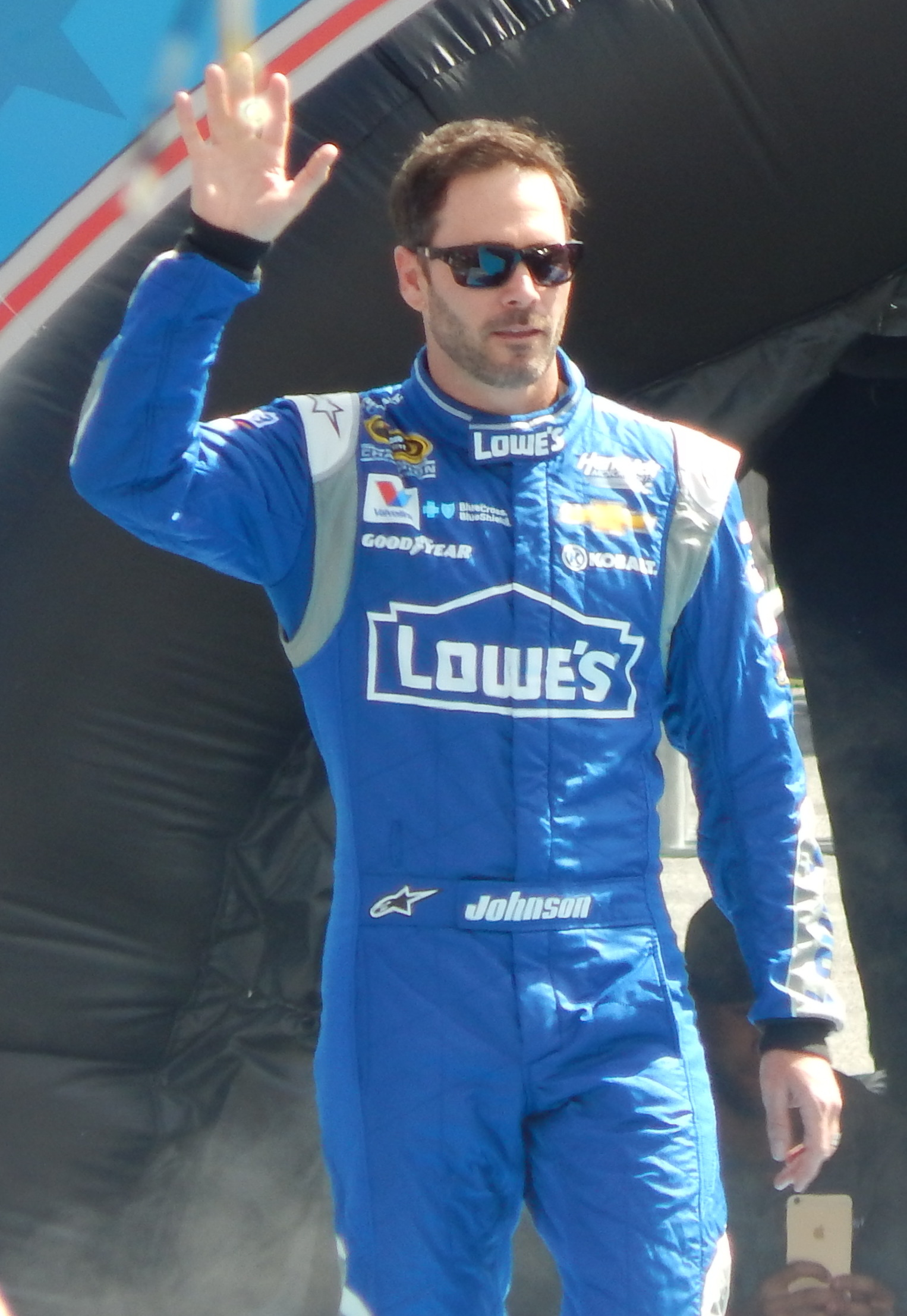
Jimmie Johnson, seen here at the 2015 Daytona 500, scored his 73rd career victory at Kansas.

===== Final laps =====
After waiving the restart with seven to go, the race restarted with six laps to go. Jimmie Johnson held off a hard charging Kevin Harvick for his 73rd career victory.

== Post-race ==
=== Driver comments ===
"It was a long hard night of racing and fighting for track position," Johnson said. "Once we got up front, we were able to hang on for the final eight or nine laps, whatever it was." Martin Truex Jr. finished ninth after leading a race high 95 laps. "Yeah, definitely not the finish we wanted, obviously, but proud of the guys for the weekend we had, just had good speed all weekend, brought a brand new car here and just proud of that," Truex Jr. said. "It's kind of disappointing, but at the same time proud of the way we ran, and I think it's something we can build off of. We should have either stayed out or took new tires. We probably did the worst thing you could have done there with just staying out and getting gas only, because we ended up being the last guy with no tires. Everybody else behind us had two and they ate us up on the restart. If we'd have taken two, we probably would have come out sixth, been in a pretty good position."

== Race results ==
Pos	No.	Driver	Team	Manufacturer	Laps	Points
1	48	Jimmie Johnson	Hendrick Motorsports	Chevrolet	267	47
2	4	Kevin Harvick	Stewart–Haas Racing	Chevrolet	267	43
3	88	Dale Earnhardt Jr.	Hendrick Motorsports	Chevrolet	267	41
4	24	Jeff Gordon	Hendrick Motorsports	Chevrolet	267	40
5	22	Joey Logano	Team Penske	Ford	267	40
6	20	Matt Kenseth	Joe Gibbs Racing	Toyota	267	39
7	2	Brad Keselowski	Team Penske	Ford	267	38
8	41	Kurt Busch	Stewart–Haas Racing	Chevrolet	267	37
9	78	Martin Truex Jr.	Furniture Row Racing	Chevrolet	267	37
10	31	Ryan Newman	Richard Childress Racing	Chevrolet	267	34
11	43	Aric Almirola	Richard Petty Motorsports	Ford	267	33
12	16	Greg Biffle	Roush Fenway Racing	Ford	267	32
13	1	Jamie McMurray	Chip Ganassi Racing	Chevrolet	267	31
14	47	A. J. Allmendinger	JTG Daugherty Racing	Chevrolet	267	30
15	42	Kyle Larson	Chip Ganassi Racing	Chevrolet	267	30
16	9	Sam Hornish Jr.	Richard Petty Motorsports	Ford	267	28
17	5	Kasey Kahne	Hendrick Motorsports	Chevrolet	267	27
18	27	Paul Menard	Richard Childress Racing	Chevrolet	267	26
19	13	Casey Mears	Germain Racing	Chevrolet	266	25
20	19	Carl Edwards	Joe Gibbs Racing	Toyota	266	25
21	15	Clint Bowyer	Michael Waltrip Racing	Toyota	266	23
22	3	Austin Dillon	Richard Childress Racing	Chevrolet	266	22
23	46	Michael Annett	HScott Motorsports	Chevrolet	266	21
24	17	Ricky Stenhouse Jr.	Roush Fenway Racing	Ford	266	20
25	83	Matt DiBenedetto (R)	BK Racing	Toyota	266	19
26	33	Ty Dillon (i)	Hillman-Circle Sport LLC	Chevrolet	266	0
27	10	Danica Patrick	Stewart–Haas Racing	Chevrolet	265	17
28	98	Josh Wise	Phil Parsons Racing	Chevrolet	265	16
29	40	Landon Cassill (i)	Hillman-Circle Sport LLC	Chevrolet	265	0
30	51	Justin Allgaier	HScott Motorsports	Chevrolet	265	14
31	6	Trevor Bayne	Roush Fenway Racing	Ford	265	13
32	38	David Gilliland	Front Row Motorsports	Ford	263	12
33	55	David Ragan	Michael Waltrip Racing	Toyota	263	11
34	34	Brett Moffitt (R)	Front Row Motorsports	Ford	263	10
35	35	Cole Whitt	Front Row Motorsports	Ford	263	9
36	95	Michael McDowell	Leavine Family Racing	Ford	262	8
37	23	J. J. Yeley (i)	BK Racing	Toyota	262	0
38	32	Joey Gase (i)	Go FAS Racing	Ford	262	0
39	14	Tony Stewart	Stewart–Haas Racing	Chevrolet	262	5
40	18	Erik Jones (i)	Joe Gibbs Racing	Toyota	258	0
41	11	Denny Hamlin	Joe Gibbs Racing	Toyota	242	3
42	26	Jeb Burton (R)	BK Racing	Toyota	205	2
43	7	Alex Bowman	Tommy Baldwin Racing	Chevrolet	153	1
Official SpongeBob SquarePants 400 results

=== Race statistics ===
- 16 lead changes among 10 different drivers
- 9 cautions for 49 laps; 1 red flag for 2 hours, 15 minutes and 30 seconds
- Time of race: 3 hours, 11 minutes, 50 seconds
- Average speed: 125.265 mph (201.594 km/h)
- Jimmie Johnson took home $243,726 in winnings

Lap Leaders
Laps	Leader
1-29	Joey Logano
30-49	Kurt Busch
50-56	Kevin Harvick
57-78	Martin Truex Jr.
79-80	Brad Keselowski
81	Matt Kenseth
82	Erik Jones (i)
83-121	Martin Truex Jr.
122–162	Brad Keselowski
163–175	Martin Truex Jr.
176–187	Carl Edwards
188–199	Martin Truex Jr.
200	Kyle Larson
201–209	Martin Truex Jr.
210–211	Kyle Larson
212–257	Kevin Harvick
258–267	Jimmie Johnson

Total laps led
Leader	Laps
Martin Truex Jr.	95
Kevin Harvick	53
Brad Keselowski	29
Kurt Busch	20
Carl Edwards	12
Jimmie Johnson	10
Kyle Larson	3
Matt Kenseth	1
Erik Jones (i)	1

==== Race awards ====
- Coors Light Pole Award: Joey Logano (28.067, 192.397 mph (309.633 km/h))
- 3M Lap Leader: Martin Truex Jr. (95 laps)
- American Ethanol Green Flag Restart Award: Kevin Harvick (30.322, 178.091 mph (286.610 km/h))
- Duralast Brakes "Bake In The Race" Award: Joey Logano
- Freescale "Wide Open": Dale Earnhardt Jr.
- Ingersoll Rand Power Move: Jeff Gordon (8 positions)
- MAHLE Clevite Engine Builder of the Race: Hendrick Engines, #4
- Mobil 1 Driver of the Race: Martin Truex Jr. (131.1 driver rating)
- Moog Steering and Suspension Problem Solver of The Race: Jimmie Johnson (crew chief Chad Knaus (0.650))
- NASCAR Sprint Cup Leader Bonus: No winner: rolls over to $80,000 at next event
- Sherwin-Williams Fastest Lap: Kyle Larson (Lap 203, 28.857, 187.129 mph (301.155 km/h))
- Sunoco Rookie of The Race: Matt DiBenedetto

== Media ==
=== Television ===
Fox Sports covered their fifth race at Kansas Speedway. Mike Joy, Larry McReynolds and Darrell Waltrip had the call in the booth for the race. Jamie Little, Chris Neville and Matt Yocum handled the pit road duties for the television side. Due to a Major League Baseball game running long on Fox Sports 1, the first 22 minutes of the broadcast was shown on Fox News Channel. The race switched back over to Fox Sports 1 as intended when the ballgame was over.

Fox Sports 1
Booth announcers	Pit reporters
Lap-by-lap: Mike Joy; Color-commentator: Larry McReynolds; Color commentator: Darrell Waltrip	Jamie Little; Chris Neville; Matt Yocum

=== Radio ===
MRN had the radio call for the race, which was simulcast on Sirius XM NASCAR Radio. Joe Moore, Jeff Striegle and Rusty Wallace called the race in the booth when the field was racing through the tri-oval. Dave Moody called the race from a billboard outside of turn 2 when the field was racing through turns 1 and 2. Kurt Becker called the race from a billboard outside of turn 3 when the field was racing through turns 3 and 4. Alex Hayden, Winston Kelley and Steve Post worked pit road for MRN.

MRN
Booth announcers	Turn announcers	Pit reporters
Lead announcer: Joe Moore; Announcer: Jeff Striegle; Announcer: Rusty Wallace	Turns 1 & 2: Dave Moody; Turns 3 & 4: Kurt Becker	Alex Hayden; Winston Kelley; Steve Post

== Standings after the race ==
Drivers' Championship standings

	Pos	Driver	Points
	1	Kevin Harvick	437
	2	Martin Truex Jr.	391 (-46)
	3	Jimmie Johnson	389 (-48)
	4	Joey Logano	375 (-62)
	5	Dale Earnhardt Jr.	360 (-77)
	6	Brad Keselowski	343 (-94)
1	7	Matt Kenseth	331 (-106)
1	8	Jamie McMurray	328 (-109)
4	9	Jeff Gordon	317 (-120)
1	10	Kasey Kahne	313 (-124)
1	11	Aric Almirola	312 (-125)
1	12	Paul Menard	306 (-131)
1	13	Ryan Newman	305 (-132)
1	14	Kurt Busch	292 (-145)
5	15	Denny Hamlin	284 (-153)
1	16	Clint Bowyer	272 (-165)

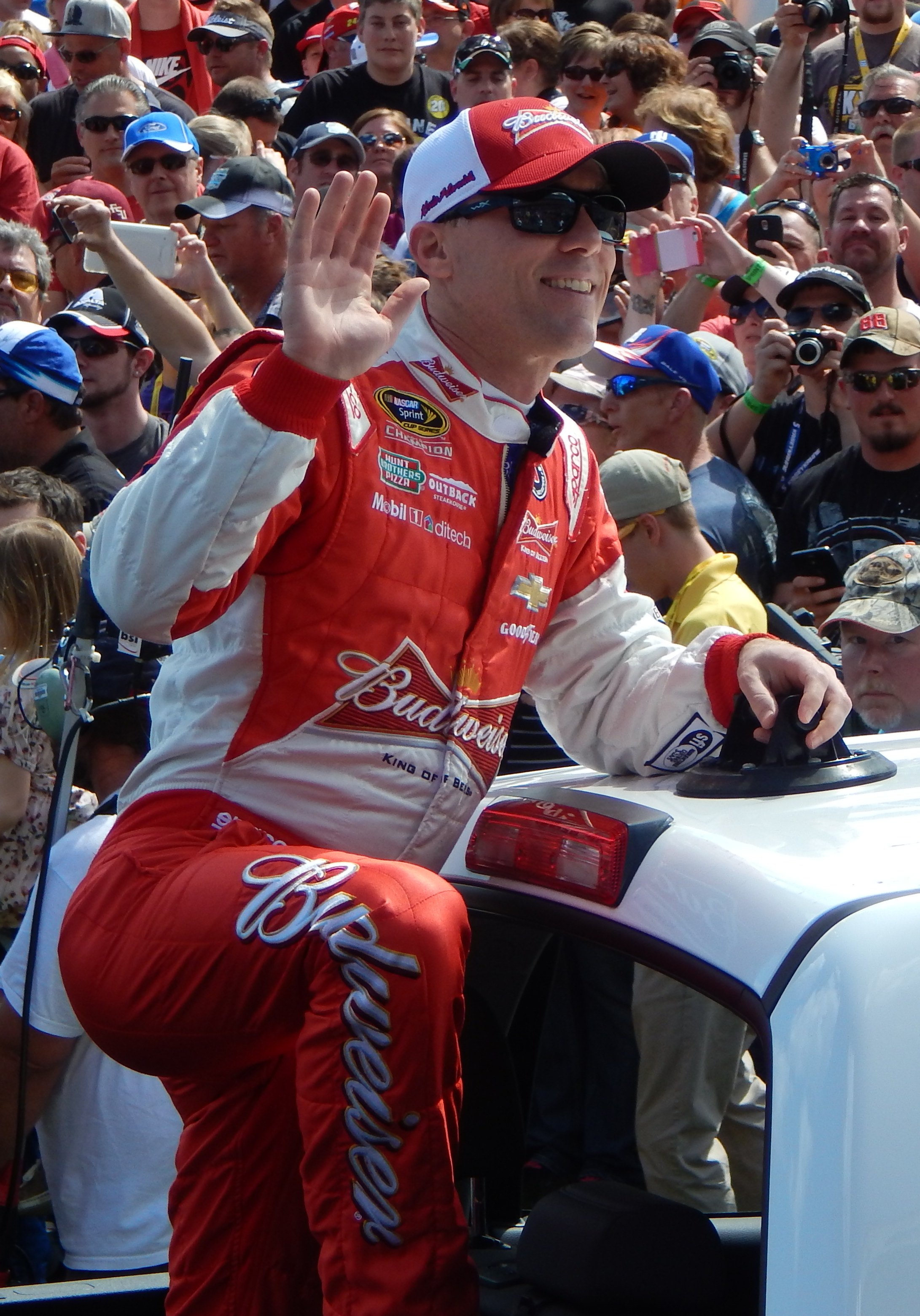
Kevin Harvick left Kansas with a 46-point lead over Martin Truex Jr.

Manufacturers' Championship standings

Pos	Manufacturer	Points
1	Chevrolet	500
2	Ford	456 (-44)
3	Toyota	423 (-77)

- Note: Only the first sixteen positions are included for the driver standings.

Previous race: 2015 GEICO 500	Sprint Cup Series; 2015 season	Next race: 2015 Coca-Cola 600
