= 2015 FedEx 400 =

2015 FedEx 400 benefiting Autism Speaks
Race details
- Race 13 of 36 in the 2015 NASCAR Sprint Cup Series
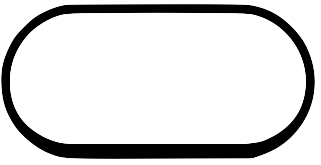
- Layout of the track
- Date: May 31, 2015
- Location: Dover International Speedway in Dover, Delaware
- Course: Permanent racing facility
- Course length: 1 miles (1.609 km)
- Distance: 405 laps, 405 mi (651.784 km)
- Scheduled distance: 400 laps, 400 mi (643.738 km)
- Weather: Mostly sunny with a temperature of 85 °F (29 °C); wind out of the south/southwest at 11 mph (18 km/h)
- Average speed: 119.547 mph (192.392 km/h)

Pole position
Driver	Denny Hamlin	Joe Gibbs Racing
- Time: 22.483

Most laps led
Driver	Martin Truex Jr.	Furniture Row Racing
- Laps: 131

Winner
No. 48	Jimmie Johnson	Hendrick Motorsports

Television in the United States
- Network: Fox Sports 1
- Announcers: Mike Joy, Larry McReynolds and Darrell Waltrip
- Nielsen ratings: 2.3/5 (Overnight); 2.6/5 (Final); 3.94 million viewers

Radio in the United States
- Radio: MRN
- Booth announcers: Joe Moore, Jeff Striegle and Rusty Wallace
- Turn announcers: Mike Bagley (Backstretch)

The 2015 FedEx 400 benefiting Autism Speaks was a NASCAR Sprint Cup Series race held on May 31, 2015, at Dover International Speedway in Dover, Delaware. Contested over 405 laps – extended by five laps due to a green-white-checkered finish – on the 1-mile (1.6-kilometre) concrete speedway, it was the 13th race of the 2015 NASCAR Sprint Cup Series season. Jimmie Johnson won the race, his fourth win of the season and tenth at Dover, while Kevin Harvick finished second and Kyle Larson finished third. Kasey Kahne and Aric Almirola rounded out the top five.

Denny Hamlin scored the pole for the race and led 118 laps on his way to a 21st-place finish after being caught up in a late race wreck. Martin Truex Jr. led the most laps for the third consecutive race on his way to a sixth-place finish. The race had 15 lead changes among nine different drivers, as well as seven caution flag periods for 40 laps.

This was the 74th career victory for Jimmie Johnson, tenth at Dover International Speedway – becoming the fifth driver to win ten or more races at one race track – and 18th at the track for Hendrick Motorsports. This win moved Jimmie Johnson up to third in the points standings. Chevrolet left Dover with a 51-point lead over Ford in the manufacturer standings.

The FedEx 400 benefiting Autism Speaks was carried by Fox Sports on the cable/satellite Fox Sports 1 network for the American television audience. The radio broadcast for the race was carried by the Motor Racing Network and Sirius XM NASCAR Radio.

== Report ==
=== Background ===
Dover International Speedway (formerly Dover Downs International Speedway) is a race track in Dover, Delaware, United States. Since opening in 1969, it has held at least two NASCAR races. In addition to NASCAR, the track also hosted USAC and the Verizon IndyCar Series. The track features one layout, a 1-mile (1.6-kilometre) concrete oval, with 24° banking in the turns and 9° banking on the straights. The speedway is owned and operated by Dover Motorsports.

The track, nicknamed "The Monster Mile", was built in 1969 by Melvin Joseph of Melvin L. Joseph Construction Company, Inc., with an asphalt surface, but was replaced with concrete in 1995. Six years later in 2001, the track's capacity moved to 135,000 seats, making the track have the largest capacity of sports venue in the mid-Atlantic. In 2002, the name changed to Dover International Speedway from Dover Downs International Speedway after Dover Downs Gaming and Entertainment split, making Dover Motorsports. From 2007 to 2009, the speedway worked on an improvement project called "The Monster Makeover", which expanded facilities at the track and beautified the track. After the 2014 season, the track's capacity was reduced to 95,500 seats.

Kevin Harvick entered Dover with a 41-point lead over Martin Truex Jr. Joey Logano entered 66 back, Dale Earnhardt Jr. entered 72 back and Jimmie Johnson entered 80 back.

==== Tires ====
Goodyear provided teams with a newly constructed left-side tire compound intended to provide more grip. Teams were also given nine sets of tires for the race instead of the normal eleven.

==== Penalties from Charlotte ====
Following two consecutive weeks of failing to pass qualifying tech inspection on the first attempt, the No. 48 Hendrick Motorsports Chevrolet and the No. 51 HScott Motorsports Chevrolet teams were to be relegated to having the last pit stall selections after the completion of qualifying. The 48 team, however, appealed the penalty and will pick in the order they qualify.

==== Entry list ====
The entry list for the FedEx 400 was released on Monday, May 25 at 12:41 p.m. Eastern time. Forty-five drivers were entered for the race. The only car with a different driver than the previous week's Coca-Cola 600 is Brian Scott. He returned to the seat of the No. 33 Hillman-Circle Sport LLC Chevrolet.

No.	Driver	Team	Manufacturer
1	Jamie McMurray	Chip Ganassi Racing	Chevrolet
2	Brad Keselowski (PC3)	Team Penske	Ford
3	Austin Dillon	Richard Childress Racing	Chevrolet
4	Kevin Harvick (PC1)	Stewart–Haas Racing	Chevrolet
5	Kasey Kahne	Hendrick Motorsports	Chevrolet
6	Trevor Bayne	Roush Fenway Racing	Ford
7	Alex Bowman	Tommy Baldwin Racing	Chevrolet
9	Sam Hornish Jr.	Richard Petty Motorsports	Ford
10	Danica Patrick	Stewart–Haas Racing	Chevrolet
11	Denny Hamlin	Joe Gibbs Racing	Toyota
13	Casey Mears	Germain Racing	Chevrolet
14	Tony Stewart (PC4)	Stewart–Haas Racing	Chevrolet
15	Clint Bowyer	Michael Waltrip Racing	Toyota
16	Greg Biffle	Roush Fenway Racing	Ford
17	Ricky Stenhouse Jr.	Roush Fenway Racing	Ford
18	Kyle Busch	Joe Gibbs Racing	Toyota
19	Carl Edwards	Joe Gibbs Racing	Toyota
20	Matt Kenseth (PC6)	Joe Gibbs Racing	Toyota
22	Joey Logano	Team Penske	Ford
23	J. J. Yeley (i)	BK Racing	Toyota
24	Jeff Gordon (PC7)	Hendrick Motorsports	Chevrolet
26	Jeb Burton (R)	BK Racing	Toyota
27	Paul Menard	Richard Childress Racing	Chevrolet
30	Jeff Green	The Motorsports Group	Chevrolet
31	Ryan Newman	Richard Childress Racing	Chevrolet
32	Mike Bliss (i)	Go FAS Racing	Ford
33	Brian Scott (i)	Hillman-Circle Sport LLC	Chevrolet
34	Brett Moffitt (R)	Front Row Motorsports	Ford
35	Cole Whitt	Front Row Motorsports	Ford
38	David Gilliland	Front Row Motorsports	Ford
39	Travis Kvapil (i)	Hillman-Circle Sport LLC	Chevrolet
40	Landon Cassill (i)	Hillman-Circle Sport LLC	Chevrolet
41	Kurt Busch (PC5)	Stewart–Haas Racing	Chevrolet
42	Kyle Larson	Chip Ganassi Racing	Chevrolet
43	Aric Almirola	Richard Petty Motorsports	Ford
46	Michael Annett	HScott Motorsports	Chevrolet
47	A. J. Allmendinger	JTG Daugherty Racing	Chevrolet
48	Jimmie Johnson (PC2)	Hendrick Motorsports	Chevrolet
51	Justin Allgaier	HScott Motorsports	Chevrolet
55	David Ragan	Michael Waltrip Racing	Toyota
62	Brendan Gaughan (i)	Premium Motorsports	Chevrolet
78	Martin Truex Jr.	Furniture Row Racing	Chevrolet
83	Matt DiBenedetto (R)	BK Racing	Toyota
88	Dale Earnhardt Jr.	Hendrick Motorsports	Chevrolet
98	Josh Wise	Phil Parsons Racing	Ford
Official entry list

Key	Meaning
(R)	Rookie
(i)	Ineligible for points
(PC#)	Past champions provisional

== First practice ==
Jimmie Johnson was the fastest in the first practice session with a time of 21.969 and a speed of 163.867 mph (263.718 km/h).

Pos	No.	Driver	Team	Manufacturer	Time	Speed
1	48	Jimmie Johnson	Hendrick Motorsports	Chevrolet	21.969	163.867
2	11	Denny Hamlin	Joe Gibbs Racing	Toyota	22.014	163.532
3	88	Dale Earnhardt Jr.	Hendrick Motorsports	Chevrolet	22.022	163.473
Official first practice results

== Qualifying ==
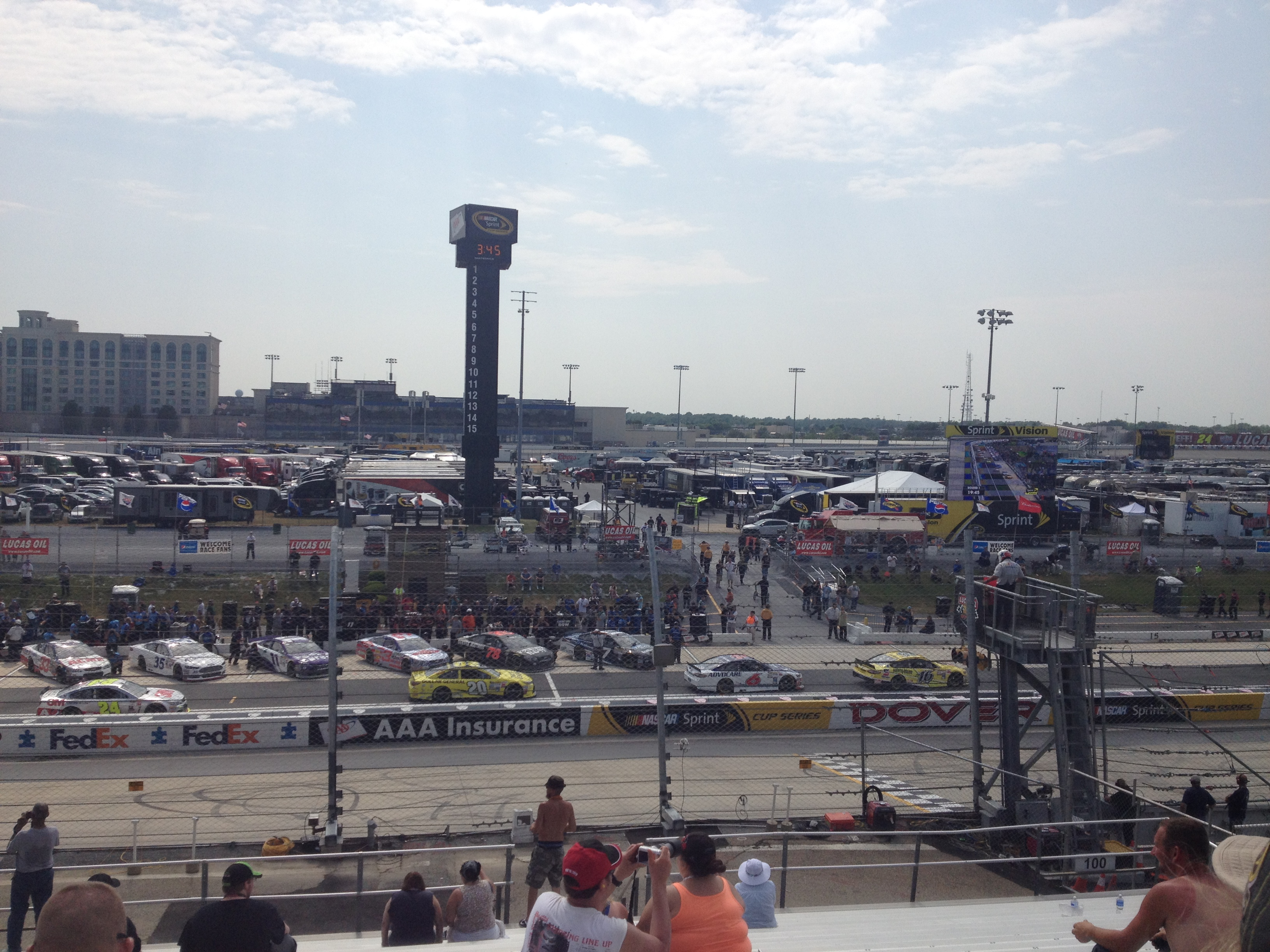
Qualifying for the race

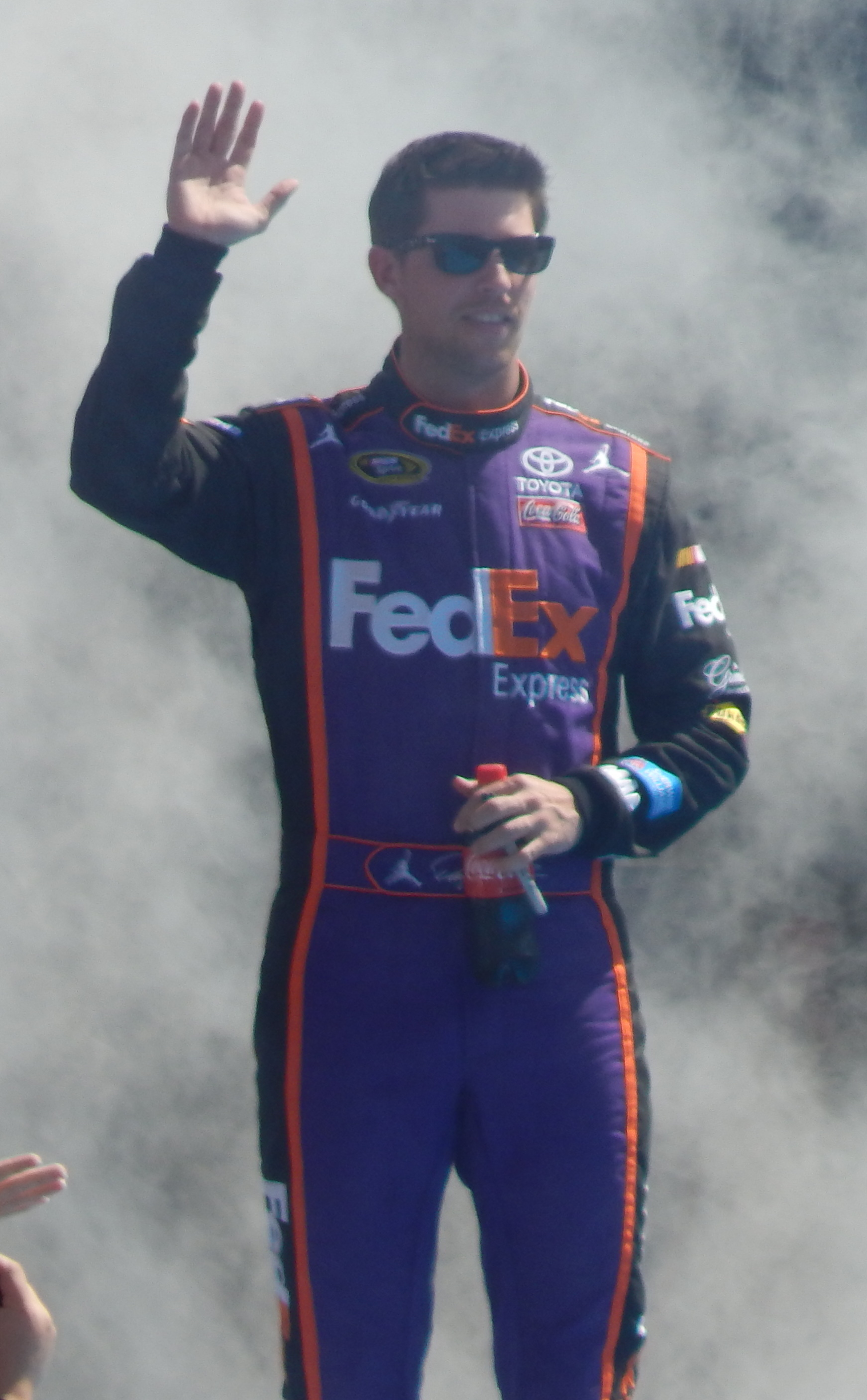
Denny Hamlin, seen here at the 2015 Daytona 500, scored the pole for the race.

Denny Hamlin won the pole with a time 22.483 and a speed of 160.121 mph (257.690 km/h). "It's so special, especially during FedEx 400 weekend," said Hamlin, who drives the FedEx Toyota. I was really more optimistic about our race trim than what I was our qualifying. Very optimistic that hopefully we can put this FedEx Cares Camry in Victory Lane where it belongs on Sunday." "Missed it a little bit, but obviously proud of the continued effort of all of the guys on the Furniture Row team," Martin Truex Jr. said. "Another awesome race car. It felt like we were just OK in practice, it didn't feel like we were a front row car. We made some adjustments and they hit it damn near perfect. We just needed a little bit." “Momentum is kind of on our side,” Greg Biffle said. “We are getting the car to drive better, getting a little better setup under it and working on our chassis back at the shop. We will continue to make these small gains and hopefully going into Pocono, Indy and Michigan we will see if we can get it up in the top-five. We are in the top-10 now, we need the top-five.” Jeff Green and Travis Kvapil failed to qualify for the race.

=== Qualifying results ===
Pos	No.	Driver	Team	Manufacturer	R1	R2	R3
1	11	Denny Hamlin	Joe Gibbs Racing	Toyota	22.553	22.463	22.483
2	78	Martin Truex Jr.	Furniture Row Racing	Chevrolet	22.539	22.492	22.539
3	42	Kyle Larson	Chip Ganassi Racing	Chevrolet	22.506	22.562	22.545
4	20	Matt Kenseth	Joe Gibbs Racing	Toyota	22.711	22.609	22.546
5	22	Joey Logano	Team Penske	Ford	22.553	22.593	22.557
6	4	Kevin Harvick	Stewart–Haas Racing	Chevrolet	22.606	22.627	22.571
7	16	Greg Biffle	Roush Fenway Racing	Ford	22.430	22.537	22.573
8	19	Carl Edwards	Joe Gibbs Racing	Toyota	22.575	22.614	22.609
9	17	Ricky Stenhouse Jr.	Roush Fenway Racing	Ford	22.626	22.601	22.635
10	18	Kyle Busch	Joe Gibbs Racing	Toyota	22.563	22.553	22.645
11	1	Jamie McMurray	Chip Ganassi Racing	Chevrolet	22.663	22.623	22.683
12	3	Austin Dillon	Richard Childress Racing	Chevrolet	22.700	22.654	22.743
13	41	Kurt Busch	Stewart–Haas Racing	Chevrolet	22.670	22.657	—
14	48	Jimmie Johnson	Hendrick Motorsports	Chevrolet	22.565	22.668	—
15	55	David Ragan	Michael Waltrip Racing	Toyota	22.725	22.690	—
16	88	Dale Earnhardt Jr. (Note: Dale Earnhardt Jr. started the race from the rear of the field for changing rear-end gears.)	Hendrick Motorsports	Chevrolet	22.729	22.716	—
17	31	Ryan Newman	Richard Childress Racing	Chevrolet	22.629	22.747	—
18	27	Paul Menard	Richard Childress Racing	Chevrolet	22.647	22.760	—
19	2	Brad Keselowski	Team Penske	Ford	22.741	22.761	—
20	15	Clint Bowyer	Michael Waltrip Racing	Toyota	22.702	22.764	—
21	13	Casey Mears	Germain Racing	Chevrolet	22.693	22.771	—
22	24	Jeff Gordon	Hendrick Motorsports	Chevrolet	22.718	22.773	—
23	43	Aric Almirola	Richard Petty Motorsports	Ford	22.700	22.773	—
24	51	Justin Allgaier	HScott Motorsports	Chevrolet	22.727	22.830	—
25	5	Kasey Kahne	Hendrick Motorsports	Chevrolet	22.746	—	—
26	14	Tony Stewart	Stewart–Haas Racing	Chevrolet	22.773	—	—
27	33	Brian Scott (i)	Hillman-Circle Sport LLC	Chevrolet	22.779	—	—
28	9	Sam Hornish Jr.	Richard Petty Motorsports	Ford	22.832	—	—
29	47	A. J. Allmendinger	JTG Daugherty Racing	Chevrolet	22.834	—	—
30	7	Alex Bowman	Tommy Baldwin Racing	Chevrolet	22.886	—	—
31	6	Trevor Bayne	Roush Fenway Racing	Ford	22.912	—	—
32	38	David Gilliland	Front Row Motorsports	Ford	22.922	—	—
33	10	Danica Patrick	Stewart–Haas Racing	Chevrolet	22.980	—	—
34	46	Michael Annett	HScott Motorsports	Chevrolet	22.983	—	—
35	26	Jeb Burton (R)	BK Racing	Toyota	22.985	—	—
36	83	Matt DiBenedetto (R)	BK Racing	Toyota	23.114	—	—
37	35	Cole Whitt	Front Row Motorsports	Ford	23.205	—	—
38	34	Brett Moffitt (R)	Front Row Motorsports	Ford	23.296	—	—
39	98	Josh Wise	Phil Parsons Racing	Ford	23.310	—	—
40	23	J. J. Yeley (i)	BK Racing	Toyota	23.342	—	—
41	62	Brendan Gaughan (i)	Premium Motorsports	Chevrolet	23.445	—	—
42	32	Mike Bliss (i)	Go FAS Racing	Ford	23.471	—	—
43	40	Landon Cassill (i)	Hillman-Circle Sport LLC	Chevrolet	23.579	—	—
Failed to qualify
44	39	Travis Kvapil (i)	Hillman-Circle Sport LLC	Chevrolet	23.189	—	—
45	30	Jeff Green (i)	The Motorsports Group	Chevrolet	23.535	—	—
Official qualifying results

== Practice (post-qualifying) ==
=== Second practice ===
Denny Hamlin was the fastest in the second practice session with a time of 23.028 and a speed of 156.331 mph (251.590 km/h).

Pos	No.	Driver	Team	Manufacturer	Time	Speed
1	11	Denny Hamlin	Joe Gibbs Racing	Toyota	23.028	156.331
2	19	Carl Edwards	Joe Gibbs Racing	Toyota	23.029	156.325
3	41	Kurt Busch	Stewart–Haas Racing	Chevrolet	23.116	155.736
Official second practice results

=== Final practice ===
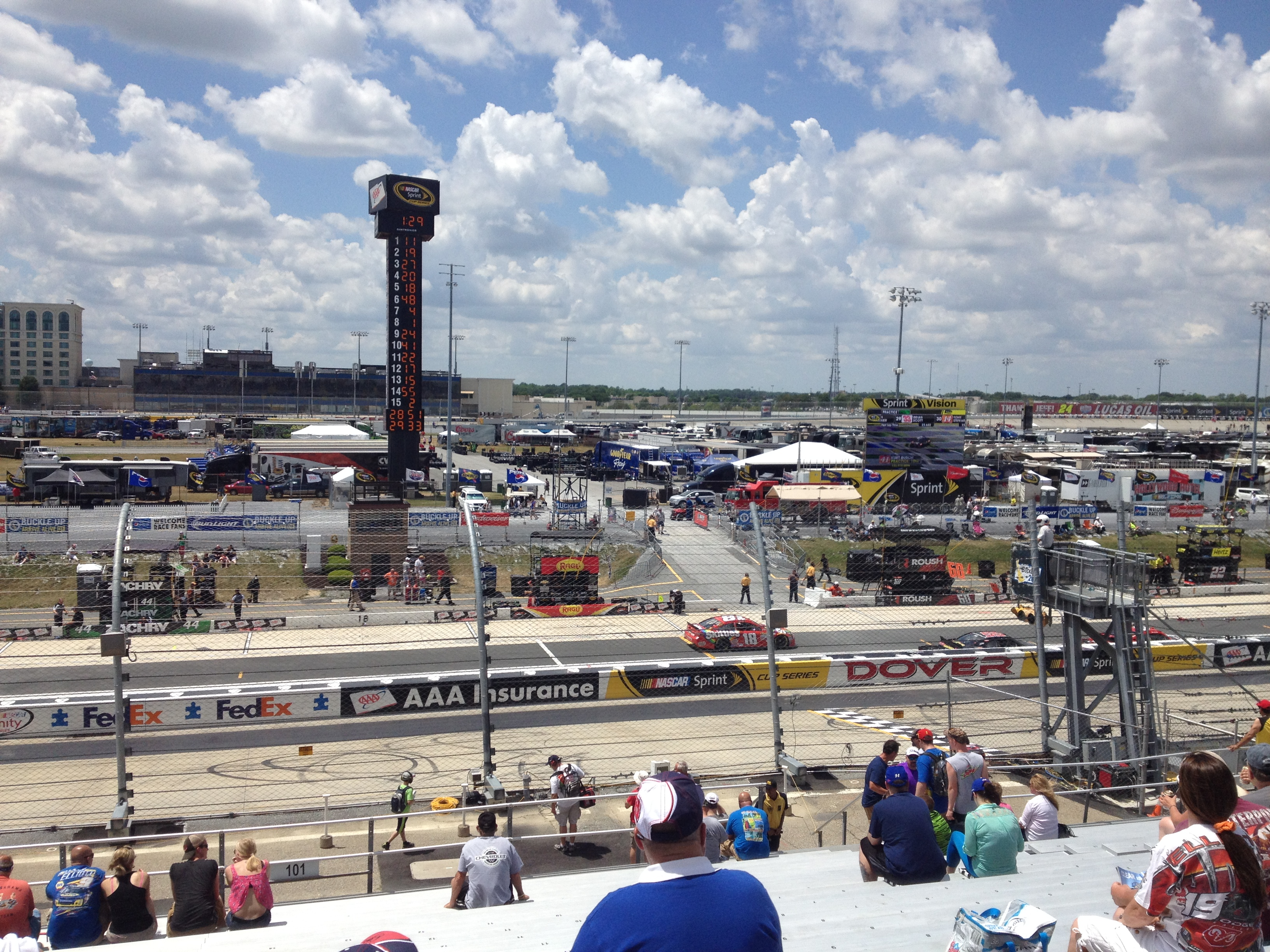
Final practice

Denny Hamlin was the fastest in the final practice session with a time of 23.064 and a speed of 156.087 mph (251.198 km/h). Dale Earnhardt Jr. had fluid leaking from his car that splashed all over the apron at the exit of pit road. His crew fixed the leak and he returned to the track to finish the session.

Pos	No.	Driver	Team	Manufacturer	Time	Speed
1	11	Denny Hamlin	Joe Gibbs Racing	Toyota	23.064	156.087
2	19	Carl Edwards	Joe Gibbs Racing	Toyota	23.136	155.602
3	27	Paul Menard	Richard Childress Racing	Chevrolet	23.195	155.206
Official final practice results

== Race ==
=== First half ===
==== Start ====
The race was scheduled to start at 1:15 p.m. but started two minutes later when Denny Hamlin led the field to the green flag. By lap 20, he caught the tail end of the field and saw his lead begin to shrink to Martin Truex Jr. After being held up by Justin Allgaier, Hamlin lost the lead to Truex Jr. on lap 45. By lap 60, Kevin Harvick began reeling in the leader. But Truex Jr. started pulling away again. Debris in turn 1 brought out the first caution on lap 74. This was the longest green flag run to start a race in the 2015 season. Hamlin reclaimed the lead by exiting pit road first.

==== Green flag run ====
The race restarted on lap 80. For the first few laps, Truex Jr. kept Hamlin from getting a big lead, but as the field caught the tail end of the field, Hamlin jumped to a bigger lead. Eventually, Truex Jr. took back the lead on lap 145. The second round of pit stops began on lap 150 when Clint Bowyer hit pit road. Truex Jr. surrendered the lead to pit on lap 158 and gave it to Hamlin. He pitted on lap 160 and handed the lead to teammate Carl Edwards. He pitted on lap 162 and handed the lead to Dale Earnhardt Jr. The second caution flew on lap 163 when Ricky Stenhouse Jr. had a tire blow out and slammed the wall in turn 2. David Gilliland was tagged for speeding on pit road during the green flag stops and was forced to serve a drive-through penalty. Edwards was tagged for taking equipment out of the pit box after the wrench used to adjust the track bar got stuck in the hole and restarted the race from the tail end of the field.

===== Trouble on the front stretch =====
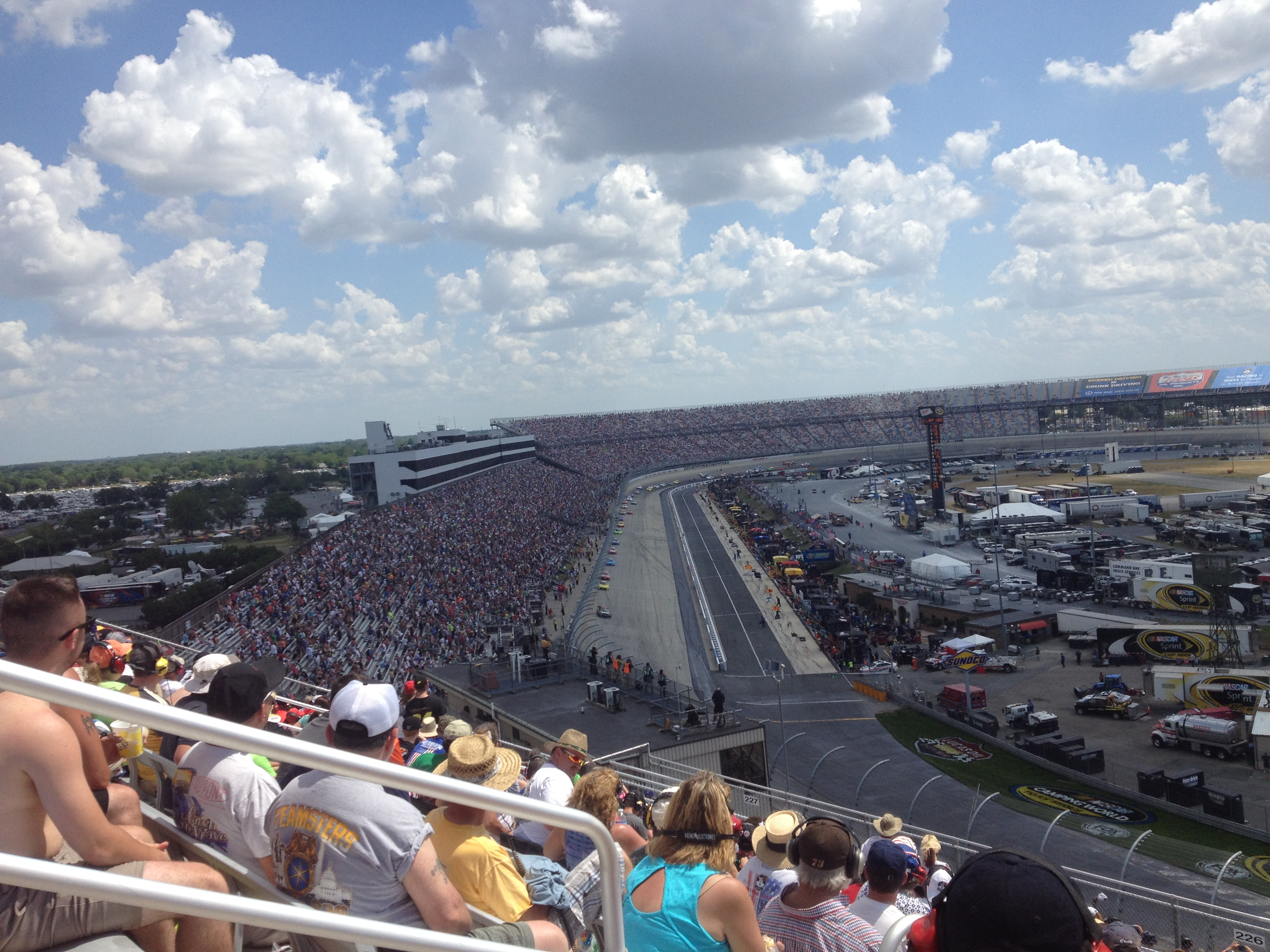
Martin Truex Jr. leads the field on lap 186

The race restarted on lap 169 with Truex Jr. in the lead. The third caution of the race flew on lap 176 for a 3-car wreck on the front stretch. This began when Trevor Bayne, while exiting turn 4, was moving up the track and got turned by Michael Annett. He overcorrected, turned down, and hit the inside wall. Annett continued to ride the wall before getting rear-ended by Allgaier. Annett continued on, but Allgaier did not. While Truex opted not to pit, most of the cars on the lead lap behind him did.

=== Second half ===
==== Halfway ====
The race restarted on lap 185. The field got strung out until the next round of pit stops on lap 247. Truex Jr. hit pit road on lap 248 and handed the lead to Kyle Busch. He made his stop on lap 251 and gave the lead to Hamlin. He served his stop on lap 258 and the lead cycled to Harvick. Edwards and Earnhardt Jr. were tagged for speeding on pit road and served drive-though penalties. Annett was tagged for an uncontrolled tire and served a drive-through penalty. The uncontrolled tire came to a rest at the outside pit wall and brought out the fourth caution of the race on lap 261. During this caution period, the concrete pit box that Tony Stewart occupied was beginning to come apart.

===== Final round of pit stops =====
The race restarted on lap 268 with Truex leading the way. Harvick took the lead the next lap. After ten laps, he pulled to a 1.8-second lead over the No. 78 car. Matt Kenseth was running fifth when he made an unscheduled stop on lap 307. He returned to the track the 22nd position, two laps down. The final round of green flag pit stops began on lap 325 when Kevin Harvick gave up the lead to pit and gave it to Kyle Busch, who pitted on lap 329 and gave the lead to Clint Bowyer. Then, Bowyer hit pit road and gave the lead to Brad Keselowski. Danica Patrick and Josh Wise were tagged for speeding on pit road and were forced to serve a drive-through penalty.

==== 50 laps to go ====
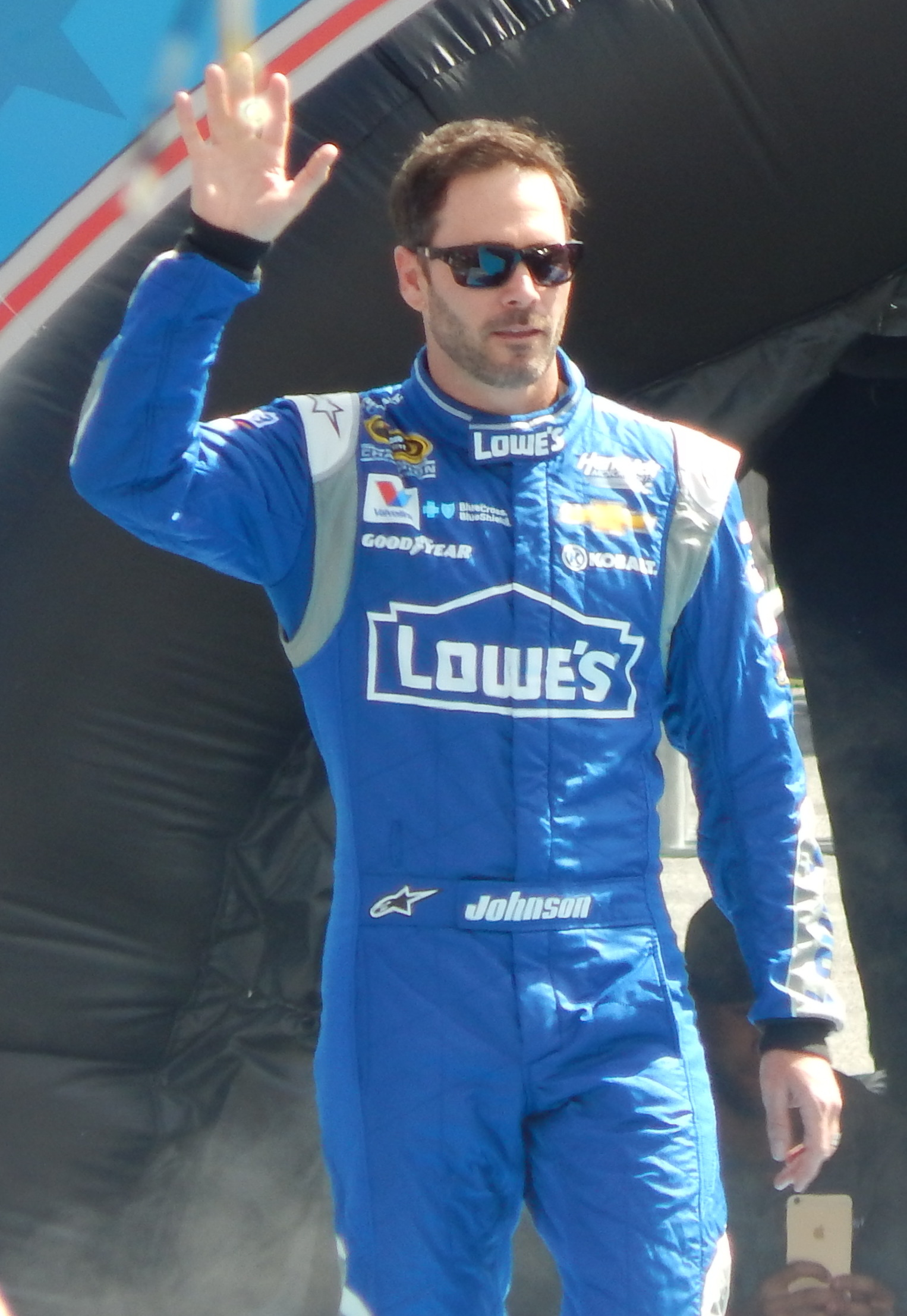
Jimmie Johnson, seen here at the 2015 Daytona 500, scored the 74th victory of his career at Dover International Speedway.

Brad Keselowski made his final stop with 43 laps to go and the lead cycled to Kevin Harvick. The fifth caution of the race flew with 25 laps to go for a two car wreck. Going through turn 3, Kyle Busch tried to pass Brian Scott when both cars slid up the track and slammed the wall. "I guess Brian said his spotter didn't say anything, and he just chopped the corner," Busch said. "I was under him already and it just sucked me around. I just hate it and I hate it for my guys. Man, we had a really good run going. Obviously, we ran in the top five all day long." Harvick and Johnson opted to stay out while third place Martin Truex Jr. and the rest of the lead lap cars pitted.

===== Carnage in the closing laps =====
The race restarted with 17 laps to go. Jimmie Johnson jumped ahead of Harvick and took the lead. The sixth caution of the race flew with 15 laps to go for a second two car wreck on the backstretch. Exiting turn 2, Hamlin got tapped by Bowyer. He turned down and back up the banking and clipped Kurt Busch.

The race restarted with ten laps to go. The seventh caution of the race flew with two laps to go for a third two car wreck in turn 4. The wreck collected A. J. Allmendinger and Casey Mears.

===== Green-White-Checker =====
The race restarted with two laps to go. Johnson shot ahead of teammate Kasey Kahne and held off Harvick to score his tenth career win at Dover. He became the fifth driver to have 10 or more wins at a single track.

== Post-race ==
=== Post-race comments ===
“God, just driving hard and working that track bar adjuster as much as I could,” Johnson said. “I was trying to be smart with my line and I guess guys on two tires weren’t all that fast. Chad (Knaus, crew chief) said something to be about that on the radio and they never really came, you know? The No. 4 (Harvick) and I did just fine on old tires and held those guys off. It was a long-fought day.” Aric Almirola scored his first top ten finish of the season with a fifth-place finish. “I am proud of (crew chief) Trent Owens and all the guys at Richard Petty Motorsports,” Almirola said. “They have been working their guts out trying to bring better cars to the race track week in and week out.” After leading the most laps for the third straight race, Martin Truex Jr. finished sixth. “We had a good car today but it was never right,” Truex Jr. said. “We were never right yesterday all through practice. We made some changes today and we made some gains on it, but never really got it where we needed it. Clean air was huge. When we were out front, we were okay. It just never turned good all day long. It eventually caught up to us.”

=== Post-race penalties ===
On the following Wednesday, NASCAR announced penalties stemming from Dover International Speedway that affect two race teams. The first is a personal conduct penalty that affects Trevor Bayne for exiting his wrecked car before he was cleared to do so by track safety officials. This violates sections 12.1, 12.8 b and 10.4.2.1 in the 2015 NASCAR rule book. He was fined $20,000 and placed on probation through the end of the calendar year.

The No. 4 team was assessed a P1 level penalty for receiving written warnings in two consecutive events (Section 12.5.3.1b,c NASCAR rule book). The team received the last choice in the pit selection process for the following weekend's event at Pocono Raceway.

== Race results ==
Pos	No.	Driver	Team	Manufacturer	Laps	Points
1	48	Jimmie Johnson	Hendrick Motorsports	Chevrolet	405	47
2	4	Kevin Harvick	Stewart–Haas Racing	Chevrolet	405	43
3	42	Kyle Larson	Chip Ganassi Racing	Chevrolet	405	42
4	5	Kasey Kahne	Hendrick Motorsports	Chevrolet	405	40
5	43	Aric Almirola	Richard Petty Motorsports	Ford	405	39
6	78	Martin Truex Jr.	Furniture Row Racing	Chevrolet	405	40
7	1	Jamie McMurray	Chip Ganassi Racing	Chevrolet	405	37
8	27	Paul Menard	Richard Childress Racing	Chevrolet	405	36
9	15	Clint Bowyer	Michael Waltrip Racing	Toyota	405	36
10	24	Jeff Gordon	Hendrick Motorsports	Chevrolet	405	34
11	22	Joey Logano	Team Penske	Ford	405	33
12	2	Brad Keselowski	Team Penske	Ford	404 (-1)	33
13	55	David Ragan	Michael Waltrip Racing	Toyota	404 (-1)	31
14	88	Dale Earnhardt Jr.	Hendrick Motorsports	Chevrolet	403 (-2)	31
15	10	Danica Patrick	Stewart–Haas Racing	Chevrolet	403 (-2)	29
16	14	Tony Stewart	Stewart–Haas Racing	Chevrolet	403 (-2)	28
17	16	Greg Biffle	Roush Fenway Racing	Ford	403 (-2)	27
18	31	Ryan Newman	Richard Childress Racing	Chevrolet	402 (-3)	26
19	19	Carl Edwards	Joe Gibbs Racing	Toyota	402 (-3)	26
20	7	Alex Bowman	Tommy Baldwin Racing	Chevrolet	402 (-3)	24
21	11	Denny Hamlin	Joe Gibbs Racing	Toyota	402 (-3)	24
22	9	Sam Hornish Jr.	Richard Petty Motorsports	Ford	400 (-5)	22
23	40	Landon Cassill (i)	Hillman-Circle Sport LLC	Chevrolet	400 (-5)	0
24	47	A. J. Allmendinger	JTG Daugherty Racing	Chevrolet	400 (-5)	20
25	38	David Gilliland	Front Row Motorsports	Ford	399 (-6)	19
26	35	Cole Whitt	Front Row Motorsports	Ford	399 (-6)	18
27	13	Casey Mears	Germain Racing	Chevrolet	399 (-6)	17
28	34	Brett Moffitt (R)	Front Row Motorsports	Ford	398 (-7)	16
29	23	J. J. Yeley (i)	BK Racing	Toyota	397 (-8)	0
30	26	Jeb Burton (R)	BK Racing	Toyota	396 (-9)	14
31	41	Kurt Busch	Stewart–Haas Racing	Chevrolet	396 (-9)	13
32	83	Matt DiBenedetto (R)	BK Racing	Toyota	395 (-10)	12
33	3	Austin Dillon	Richard Childress Racing	Chevrolet	395 (-10)	11
34	62	Brendan Gaughan (i)	Premium Motorsports	Chevrolet	392 (-13)	0
35	32	Mike Bliss (i)	Go FAS Racing	Ford	391 (-14)	0
36	18	Kyle Busch	Joe Gibbs Racing	Toyota	374 (-31)	9
37	17	Ricky Stenhouse Jr.	Roush Fenway Racing	Ford	373 (-32)	7
38	33	Brian Scott (i)	Hillman-Circle Sport LLC	Chevrolet	372 (-33)	0
39	20	Matt Kenseth	Joe Gibbs Racing	Toyota	346 (-59)	5
40	98	Josh Wise	Phil Parsons Racing	Ford	346 (-59)	4
41	46	Michael Annett	HScott Motorsports	Chevrolet	317 (-88)	3
42	51	Justin Allgaier	HScott Motorsports	Chevrolet	310 (-95)	2
43	6	Trevor Bayne	Roush Fenway Racing	Ford	221 (-184)	1
Official FedEx 400 results

=== Race statistics ===
- 15 lead changes among 9 different drivers
- 7 cautions for 40 laps
- Time of race: 3 hours, 23 minutes, 16 seconds
- Average speed: 119.547 mph (192.392 km/h)
- Jimmie Johnson took home $305,826 in winnings

Lap Leaders
Laps	Leader
1-41	Denny Hamlin
42-76	Martin Truex Jr.
77-143	Denny Hamlin
144-157	Martin Truex Jr.
158-159	Denny Hamlin
160-162	Carl Edwards
163-165	Dale Earnhardt Jr.
166-247	Martin Truex Jr.
248-250	Kyle Busch
251-258	Denny Hamlin
259-324	Kevin Harvick
325-328	Kyle Busch
329	Clint Bowyer
330-357	Brad Keselowski
358-382	Kevin Harvick
383-405	Jimmie Johnson

Total laps led
Leader	Laps
Martin Truex Jr.	131
Denny Hamlin	118
Kevin Harvick	91
Brad Keselowski	28
Jimmie Johnson	23
Kyle Busch	7
Dale Earnhardt Jr.	3
Carl Edwards	3
Clint Bowyer	1

==== Race awards ====
- Coors Light Pole Award: Denny Hamlin (22.483, 160.121 mph (257.690 km/h))
- 3M Lap Leader: Martin Truex Jr. (131 laps)
- American Ethanol Green Flag Restart Award: Martin Truex Jr.
- Duralast Brakes "Bake In The Race" Award: Kevin Harvick
- Freescale "Wide Open": Kevin Harvick
- Ingersoll Rand Power Move: Kyle Larson (7 positions)
- MAHLE Clevite Engine Builder of the Race: Hendrick Engines, #42
- Mobil 1 Driver of the Race: Martin Truex Jr. (130.3 driver rating)
- Moog Steering and Suspension Problem Solver of The Race: Kasey Kahne (crew chief Keith Rodden (-0.083))
- NASCAR Sprint Cup Leader Bonus: No winner: rolls over to $100,000 at next event
- Sherwin-Williams Fastest Lap: Denny Hamlin (Lap 2, 22.879, 157.347 mph (253.225 km/h))
- Sunoco Rookie of The Race: Brett Moffitt

== Media ==
=== Television ===
Fox Sports covered their 15th race at Dover International Speedway. Mike Joy, former crew chief Larry McReynolds and two-time Dover winner Darrell Waltrip had the call in the booth for the race. Jamie Little, Chris Neville and Matt Yocum handled the pit road duties for the television side.

Fox Sports 1
Booth announcers	Pit reporters
Lap-by-lap: Mike Joy; Color-commentator: Larry McReynolds; Color-commentator: Darrell Waltrip	Jamie Little; Chris Neville; Matt Yocum

=== Radio ===
MRN had the radio call for the race, which was simulcast on Sirius XM NASCAR Radio. Joe Moore, Jeff Striegle and three-time Dover winner Rusty Wallace called the race in the booth when the field went racing down the front stretch. Mike Bagley called the race from the Monster Mile suites when the field went racing down the backstretch. Alex Hayden, Glenn Jarrett and Steve Post worked pit road for MRN.

MRN
Booth announcers	Turn announcers	Pit reporters
Lead announcer: Joe Moore; Announcer: Jeff Striegle; Announcer: Rusty Wallace	Backstretch: Mike Bagley	Alex Hayden; Glenn Jarrett; Steve Post

== Standings after the race ==
Drivers' Championship standings

	Pos	Driver	Points
	1	Kevin Harvick	516
	2	Martin Truex Jr.	472 (-44)
2	3	Jimmie Johnson	440 (-76)
1	4	Joey Logano	440 (-76)
1	5	Dale Earnhardt Jr.	432 (-84)
	6	Brad Keselowski	414 (-102)
1	7	Jamie McMurray	390 (-126)
2	8	Kasey Kahne	385 (-131)
	9	Jeff Gordon	380 (-136)
2	10	Aric Almirola	378 (-138)
4	11	Matt Kenseth	377 (-139)
1	12	Paul Menard	372 (-144)
2	13	Ryan Newman	369 (-147)
1	14	Denny Hamlin	345 (-171)
1	15	Kurt Busch	340 (-176)
	16	Carl Edwards	338 (-178)

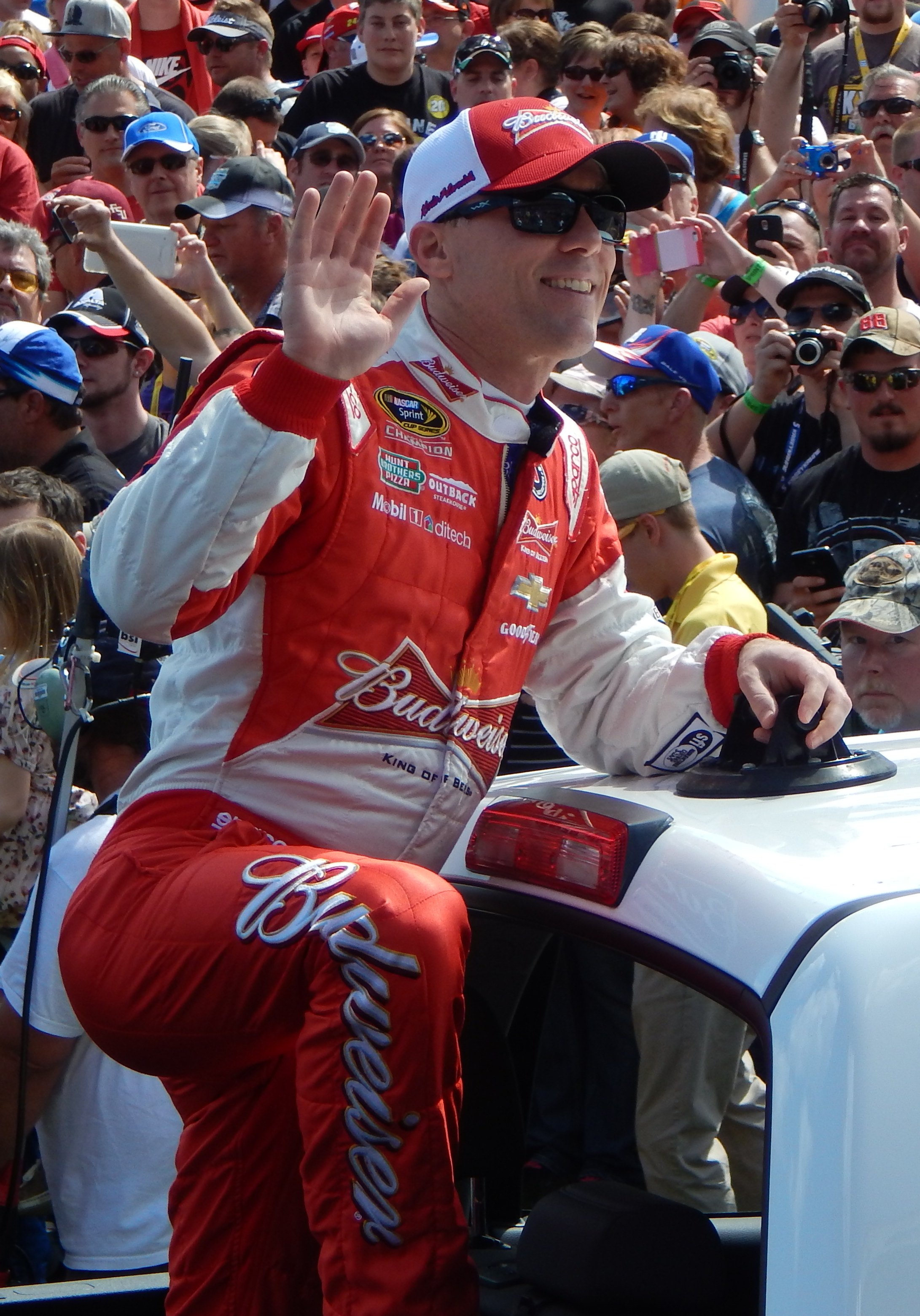
Kevin Harvick left Dover with a 44-point lead over Martin Truex Jr.

Manufacturers' Championship standings

Pos	Manufacturer	Points
1	Chevrolet	588
2	Ford	537 (-51)
3	Toyota	506 (-82)

- Note: Only the first sixteen positions are included for the driver standings.

== Note ==
Previous race: 2015 Coca-Cola 600	Sprint Cup Series; 2015 season	Next race: 2015 Axalta "We Paint Winners" 400
