= MAHLE Powertrain =

Engineering services division of MAHLE

MAHLE Powertrain Ltd
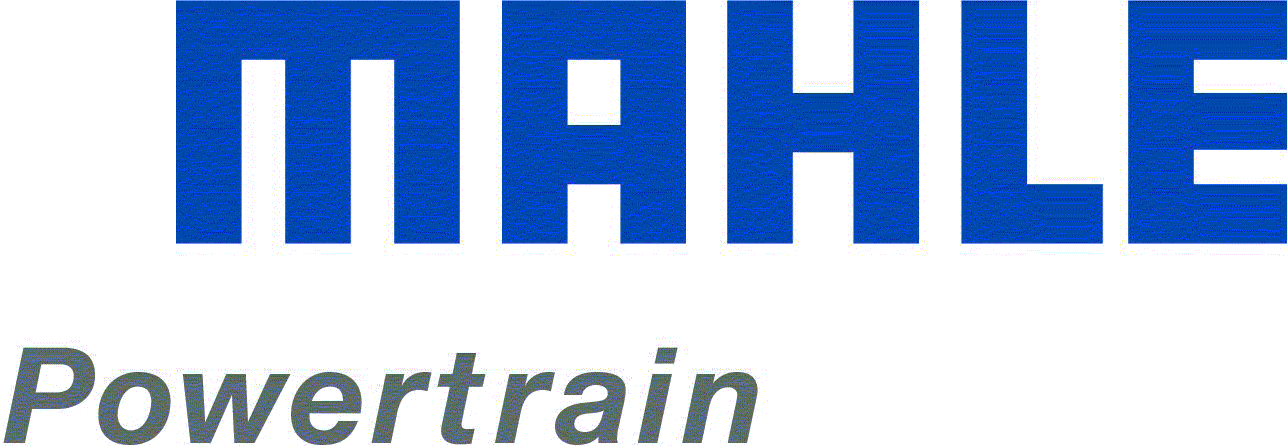
- Company type: Limited company
- Industry: Automotive
- Founded: 2005
- Headquarters: Northampton, UK
- Services: Engineering, manufacturing
- Number of employees: 500 (2017)
- Parent: MAHLE
- Website: www.mahle-powertrain.com

MAHLE Powertrain Ltd is the engineering services division of MAHLE GmbH. With its headquarters in Northampton, UK and sister company in Plymouth, Michigan, United States, the company specialises in the design, development and testing of electrified powertrain systems and provides a broad spectrum of engineering services to its global customer base. MAHLE Powertrain's engineers and technical specialists are also present in the MAHLE research and development centres in Munich, Germany and Shanghai, China.

== History ==
The ownership of MAHLE Powertrain can be traced back to Cosworth, which was owned by the Vickers Group from March 1990.

In September 1998, Audi bought the Cosworth business for £117 million, then split it into two halves. Cosworth Racing was sold to Ford for an undisclosed sum, while Audi retained a new company, Cosworth Technology which was formed to perform production, engineering, casting, and consultancy work. This newly formed Cosworth Technology Group consisted of the engineering headquarters at Northampton, the engine assembly and machining facilities at Wellingborough, and the low volume, aluminium alloy, and sand casting facility at Worcester (retaining the famous Coscast process capability within the group). The group also included a sister engineering company in Novi (MI), previously known as Intelligent Controls Inc.

On 1 January 2005, MAHLE acquired the Cosworth Technology Group. Since 1958, the Cosworth Technology Group has developed and produced high-performance engines. On 1 July 2005, the MAHLE Group absorbed it and changed its name to MAHLE Powertrain.

== Company profile ==
MAHLE Powertrain Ltd. is the engineering services division of MAHLE GmbH. It specialises in the design, development, testing, and manufacturing of electrified powertrain systems and high efficiency internal combustion engines. In addition to the head office in Northampton, UK, it also operates sites in Munich, Germany and Plymouth, Michigan. Additionally, the company has engineers and technical staff based at the parent company (MAHLE GmbH) R&D centre in Shanghai.

== Engineering services ==
MAHLE Powertrain provides engineering in all aspects of propulsion system development. This includes concept studies, design and simulation work, development and calibration work, and validation. Some projects are stand-alone and may employ specialists from a single department; others involve engineers from all disciplines within the company.

Design, Verification & Purchasing

Design and analysis engineers use computer-aided engineering tools to model, simulate and design complete powertrain systems from initial concept ideas to production-ready detailed designs. The company also designs performance upgrade packages for existing powertrains.

Thermodynamics & Applications

Performance and emissions engineers carry out development and optimisation of combustion systems, appraising and selecting the most appropriate combinations of hardware during an engine development programme. Calibration engineers at MAHLE Powertrain configure engine management systems to optimise performance, efficiency and driveability. They also calibrate the on-board diagnostic systems that are now mandatory on road vehicles (ref – Directive 98/69/EC 13 October 1998). Additionally, MAHLE Powertrain performs drive-cycle emissions testing on in-house dynamometers. Engine calibrations are tailored to target specific emissions legislation.

Build & Test

At their Northampton (UK) site, MAHLE Powertrain has extensive engine, battery and vehicle testing facilities which are used to develop performance and reliability and reduce CO_{2} emissions and fuel consumption.

MAHLE Powertrain's engineering services include the assembly of battery packs and complete engines in prototype and small batch volumes.

== Internal research and development ==
Advanced Downsizing Engine

MAHLE Powertrain designed and developed the MAHLE Advanced Downsizing Technology Demonstrator engine, which has become a recognised industry benchmark for highly optimised gasoline engine performance. Bench tests initially proved that it was capable of delivering abundant power and torque with very low fuel consumption in a high durability package. During 2010, this engine was installed into a mid-sized vehicle for further optimisation and drivability assessment. The potential for significant fuel economy benefits under 'real world' driving conditions were then demonstrated and verified.

MAHLE Downsizing Engine

Key features of the downsizing engine include:

- Aggressive engine downsizing: 50% displacement reduction
- High specific output: 100 kW/L
- Fuel economy benefit (proven): 5.8 L/100 km (49 mpg)
- CO_{2} emissions (NEDC): 135 g/km
- MAHLE NIKASIL® parent bore cylinder coating
- BMTS single-stage turbocharger

Compact Range Extender Engine

MAHLE Powertrain was commissioned by its parent company, MAHLE, to develop an engine for use as a range extender for electric vehicles. The design started from a completely clean sheet, and working prototypes were being tested 9 months after the start of concept work in 2009. The principle behind range-extended electric vehicles is to use an internal combustion engine to recharge the onboard battery to enhance the distance the vehicle can travel between charges, something that is currently a major limitation of fully electric vehicles. A demonstrator vehicle has recently been built.

Key features of the range extender engine include:

- 900 cm^{3} 2 cylinder spark-ignition engine
- 30 kW output
- Compliant with Euro 6 emissions legislation
- Fully integrated axial-flux generator

Range Extender optimised for:

- Cost
- Weight (< 70 kg, incl. generator)
- Package volume (the engine is the size of an A3 sheet of paper in plan view)
- NVH

Single Cylinder Research Engine

MAHLE Powertrain has undertaken several research projects using their bespoke single-cylinder optical engine. The engine is capable of providing optical access to the combustion chamber at speeds of up to 5000rpm, and can be run without optical access at up to 8500 rpm thanks to careful first and second order balancing.

MAHLE Flexible ECU (MFE)

The MAHLE Flexible ECU can be used to support development and calibration activities for gasoline and diesel products in the following areas:

- Full integration with existing vehicle systems, ideal for producing 'close to production level' demonstration vehicles for new hardware concepts
- Software, control algorithms, and system development
- Benchmarking
- Research and development programmes
- Demonstration of new engine hardware concepts

MAHLE Stirling Engine

The MAHLE Stirling engine develops 25 kW for use in renewable power generation applications. The engine was designed for use with a solar mirror dish configuration to collect and focus the Sun's heat on to the engine's heat exchanger to provide power. The engine employs four cylinders which are arranged in a square (U4) pattern using two crankshafts geared together using a configuration known as 'double leading Alpha'. This compact and symmetrical cylinder arrangement minimises heat losses and offers the best thermodynamic efficiency. The pistons are double-acting, with pressurised hydrogen at up to 200 bar above and below. A cross-head arrangement with a sliding gas seal is used to connect to the connecting rod and seal the lower volume. Extensive CAE analysis calculations were used to guide and validate the design in the concept phase. A dedicated 1-D Thermodynamic simulation software was developed to assist with optimising the geometry of the engine. During the concept development phase, four prototype engines and two seal development rigs were built for testing, as using solar energy as the heat source is not feasible for concept development the natural gas burner technology from the MAHLE Powertrain foundry was used to maintain the engine heat exchanger at a continuous 750 °C. The engine exceeded its performance targets by achieving up to 26 kW and a peak thermal efficiency of up to 43%.
