= 2015 Toyota Owners 400 =

Race details
- Race 9 of 36 in the 2015 NASCAR Sprint Cup Series
- Layout of the track
- Date: April 26, 2015
- Location: Richmond International Raceway in Richmond, Virginia
- Course: Permanent racing facility
- Course length: 0.75 miles (1.2 km)
- Distance: 400 laps, 300 mi (482.803 km)
- Weather: Light rain showers with a temperature of 50 °F (10 °C); wind out of the east at 6 mph (9.7 km/h) (Saturday); Sunny, clear blue skies with a temperature of 55 °F (13 °C); wind out of the north/northeast at 6 mph (9.7 km/h) (Sunday)
- Average speed: 97.157 mph (156.359 km/h)

Pole position
Driver	Joey Logano	Team Penske
- Time: 21.248

Most laps led
Driver	Kurt Busch	Stewart–Haas Racing
- Laps: 291

Winner
No. 41	Kurt Busch	Stewart–Haas Racing

Television in the United States
- Network: Fox
- Announcers: Mike Joy, Larry McReynolds and Darrell Waltrip
- Nielsen ratings: 3.1/6 (Overnight); 3.3/6 (Final); 5.2 Million viewers

Radio in the United States
- Radio: MRN
- Booth announcers: Joe Moore and Jeff Striegle
- Turn announcers: Mike Bagley (Backstretch)

The 2015 Toyota Owners 400 was a NASCAR Sprint Cup Series race held at Richmond International Raceway in Richmond, Virginia. It was scheduled to be held on April 25, 2015, but was run on April 26, 2015 due to rain. Contested over 400 laps on the 0.75 mile (1.2 km) D-shaped short track, it was the ninth race of the 2015 NASCAR Sprint Cup season. Kurt Busch won the race, his first of the season, while teammate Kevin Harvick finished runner-up. Jimmie Johnson, Jamie McMurray and Joey Logano rounded out the top five.

Joey Logano won the pole for the race. He led 94 laps on his way to a fifth-place finish. Kurt Busch led a race high of 291 laps. The race had twelve lead changes among five different drivers, as well as eight caution flag periods for 53 laps.

This was the 26th career victory for Kurt Busch, second at Richmond International Raceway and first at the track for Stewart–Haas Racing. The win moved Busch up to 18th in the points standings. Chevrolet left Richmond with a 29-point lead over Ford in the manufacturer standings.

The Toyota Owners 400 was carried by Fox Sports on the broadcast Fox network for the American television audience. The radio broadcast for the race was carried by the Motor Racing Network and Sirius XM NASCAR Radio.

== Report ==
=== Background ===
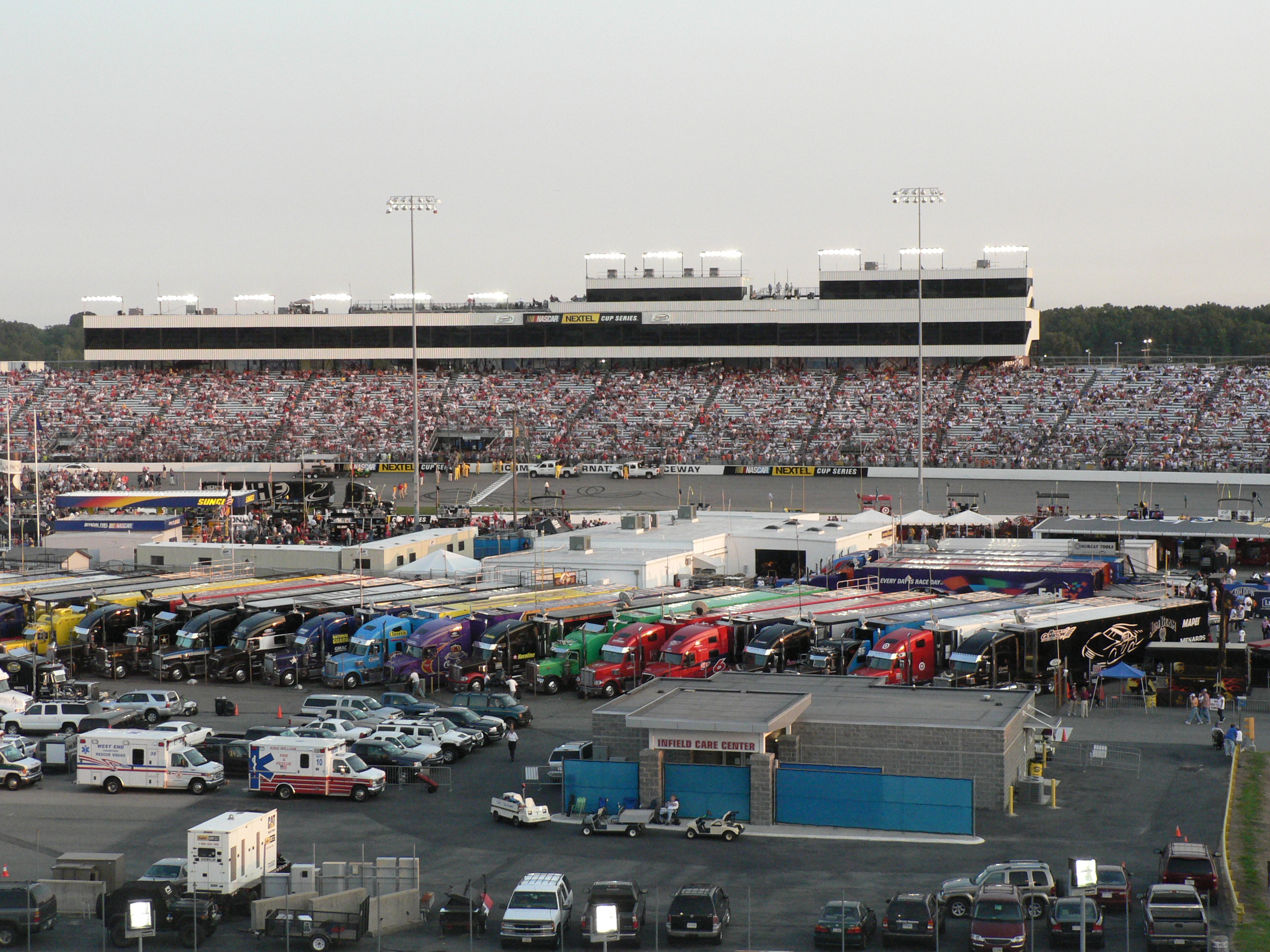
Richmond International Raceway, the track where the race was held.

Richmond International Raceway (RIR) is a 3/4-mile (1.2 km), D-shaped, asphalt race track located just outside Richmond, Virginia in Henrico County. It hosts the NASCAR Sprint Cup Series and Xfinity Series. "America's Premier Short Track" formerly hosted a NASCAR Camping World Truck Series race, a Verizon IndyCar Series race, and two USAC sprint car races.

Kevin Harvick entered Richmond with a 30-point lead over Joey Logano. Martin Truex Jr. entered 33 back. Jimmie Johnson entered 56 back. Brad Keselowski entered 59 back.

==== Changes to the track ====
Following an incident from last year's Federated Auto Parts 400, Richmond International Raceway has added metal barriers and more security personnel to prevent fans from scaling the catch fence during the race. With 71 laps to go in last September's race, a man identified as James Dennis climbed to the top of the catch fence overhead of turn 4. This forced David Hoots, competition director for the Sprint Cup Series, to put the race under caution. "It's frustrating and unfortunate," Dennis Bickmeier, track president of Richmond, said Friday. "I was very adamant after hearing about it that fans don't do that. A fan doesn't disrupt an event. You respect it."

==== Entry list ====
The entry list for the Toyota Owners 400 was released on Monday, April 20, 2015 at 11:23 a.m. Eastern time. Forty-five cars were entered for the race. Chase Elliott attempted to make his second career Sprint Cup Series start in the No. 25 Hendrick Motorsports Chevrolet. Ron Hornaday Jr. was on the initial entry list, but The Motorsports Group decided to replace him in the No. 30 Chevrolet, which was driven by Jeff Green who attempted to make his first start since the 2011 Lenox Industrial Tools 301 at New Hampshire Motor Speedway. Reed Sorenson drove the No. 34 Front Row Motorsports Ford that had been driven by Chris Buescher.

No.	Driver	Team	Manufacturer
1	Jamie McMurray	Chip Ganassi Racing	Chevrolet
2	Brad Keselowski (PC3)	Team Penske	Ford
3	Austin Dillon	Richard Childress Racing	Chevrolet
4	Kevin Harvick (PC1)	Stewart–Haas Racing	Chevrolet
5	Kasey Kahne	Hendrick Motorsports	Chevrolet
6	Trevor Bayne	Roush Fenway Racing	Ford
7	Alex Bowman	Tommy Baldwin Racing	Chevrolet
9	Sam Hornish Jr.	Richard Petty Motorsports	Ford
10	Danica Patrick	Stewart–Haas Racing	Chevrolet
11	Denny Hamlin	Joe Gibbs Racing	Toyota
13	Casey Mears	Germain Racing	Chevrolet
14	Tony Stewart (PC4)	Stewart–Haas Racing	Chevrolet
15	Clint Bowyer	Michael Waltrip Racing	Toyota
16	Greg Biffle	Roush Fenway Racing	Ford
17	Ricky Stenhouse Jr.	Roush Fenway Racing	Ford
18	David Ragan	Joe Gibbs Racing	Toyota
19	Carl Edwards	Joe Gibbs Racing	Toyota
20	Matt Kenseth (PC6)	Joe Gibbs Racing	Toyota
22	Joey Logano	Team Penske	Ford
23	J. J. Yeley (i)	BK Racing	Toyota
24	Jeff Gordon (PC7)	Hendrick Motorsports	Chevrolet
25	Chase Elliott (i)	Hendrick Motorsports	Chevrolet
26	Jeb Burton (R)	BK Racing	Toyota
27	Paul Menard	Richard Childress Racing	Chevrolet
30	Jeff Green (i)	The Motorsports Group	Chevrolet
31	Ryan Newman	Richard Childress Racing	Chevrolet
32	Joey Gase (i)	Go FAS Racing	Ford
33	Alex Kennedy (R)	Hillman-Circle Sport LLC	Chevrolet
34	Reed Sorenson	Front Row Motorsports	Ford
35	Cole Whitt	Front Row Motorsports	Ford
38	David Gilliland	Front Row Motorsports	Ford
40	Landon Cassill (i)	Hillman-Circle Sport LLC	Chevrolet
41	Kurt Busch (PC5)	Stewart–Haas Racing	Chevrolet
42	Kyle Larson	Chip Ganassi Racing	Chevrolet
43	Aric Almirola	Richard Petty Motorsports	Ford
46	Michael Annett	HScott Motorsports	Chevrolet
47	A. J. Allmendinger	JTG Daugherty Racing	Chevrolet
48	Jimmie Johnson (PC2)	Hendrick Motorsports	Chevrolet
51	Justin Allgaier	HScott Motorsports	Chevrolet
55	Brett Moffitt (R)	Michael Waltrip Racing	Toyota
62	Brendan Gaughan (i)	Premium Motorsports	Chevrolet
78	Martin Truex Jr.	Furniture Row Racing	Chevrolet
83	Matt DiBenedetto (R)	BK Racing	Toyota
88	Dale Earnhardt Jr.	Hendrick Motorsports	Chevrolet
98	Josh Wise	Phil Parsons Racing	Ford
Official initial entry list
Official updated entry list

Key	Meaning
(R)	Rookie
(i)	Ineligible for points
(PC#)	Past champions provisional

== Practice ==
=== First practice ===
Brad Keselowski was the fastest in the first practice session with a time of 21.414 and a speed of 126.086 mph (202.916 km/h).

Pos	No.	Driver	Team	Manufacturer	Time	Speed
1	2	Brad Keselowski	Team Penske	Ford	21.414	126.086
2	88	Dale Earnhardt Jr.	Hendrick Motorsports	Chevrolet	21.498	125.593
3	4	Kevin Harvick	Stewart–Haas Racing	Chevrolet	21.511	125.517
Official first practice results

=== Final practice ===
Kasey Kahne was the fastest in the final practice session with a time of 21.368 and a speed of 126.357 mph (203.352 km/h).

Pos	No.	Driver	Team	Manufacturer	Time	Speed
1	5	Kasey Kahne	Hendrick Motorsports	Chevrolet	21.368	126.357
2	16	Greg Biffle	Roush Fenway Racing	Ford	21.401	126.162
3	19	Carl Edwards	Joe Gibbs Racing	Toyota	21.424	126.027
Official final practice results

== Qualifying ==
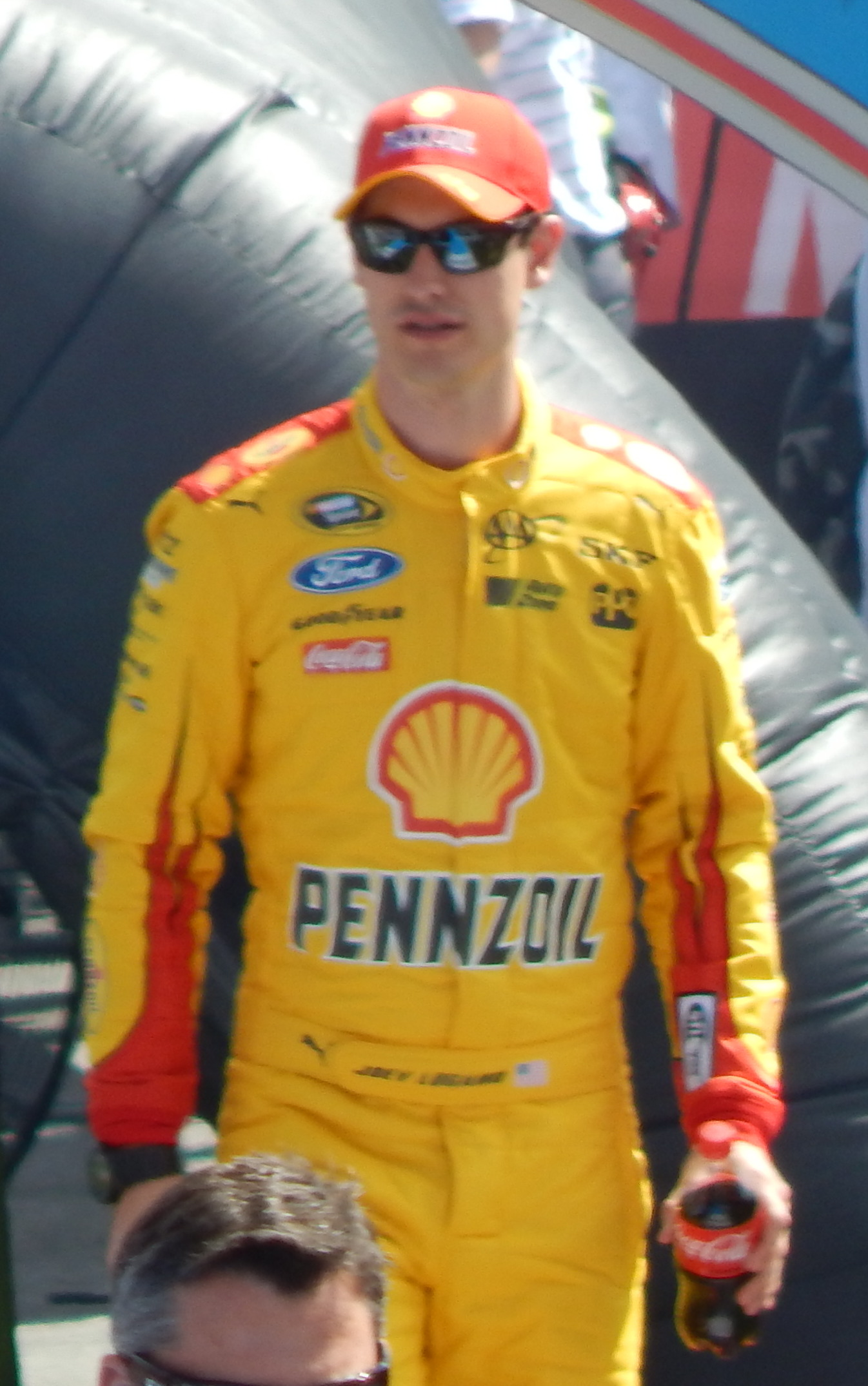
Joey Logano, seen here at the 2015 Daytona 500, won the pole for the Toyota Owners 400.

Joey Logano won the pole with a time of 21.248 and a speed of 127.071 mph (204.501 km/h). “The guys did a great job getting us faster today,” Logano said. “It is fun because you go out and run all these laps and that lap didn’t even actually feel that good because you have seven or eight laps on your tires and the car is sliding around a lot so it is funny that the pole sitting car is sliding all over the place but everyone is on old tires out there.” Denny Hamlin, who got out of the car last week at Bristol because of neck spasms, qualified second. “I’m 100 percent fore sure,” the Joe Gibbs Racing driver said. “I would have liked the pole but I am definitely happy for Joey to see him get it,” Brad Keselowski said of his teammate being on the pole. “It is nice for Team Penske and great for Ford. If you can’t get a pole you want it to be your teammate so I am happy that he was able to get it done.” Jeb Burton and Brendan Gaughan failed to qualify for the race. Just before the race, BK Racing announced that Burton will drive the No. 23 car in place of teammate J. J. Yeley. Because of the driver change, Jeb Burton started the race from the rear of the field.

=== Qualifying results ===
Pos	No.	Driver	Team	Manufacturer	R1	R2	R3
1	22	Joey Logano	Team Penske	Ford	21.089	21.303	21.248
2	11	Denny Hamlin	Joe Gibbs Racing	Toyota	21.121	21.080	21.294
3	41	Kurt Busch	Stewart–Haas Racing	Chevrolet	20.987	21.297	21.326
4	47	A. J. Allmendinger	JTG Daugherty Racing	Chevrolet	21.136	21.294	21.332
5	4	Kevin Harvick	Stewart–Haas Racing	Chevrolet	20.840	21.152	21.356
6	78	Martin Truex Jr.	Furniture Row Racing	Chevrolet	21.043	21.236	21.409
7	2	Brad Keselowski	Team Penske	Ford	20.894	21.220	21.424
8	20	Matt Kenseth	Joe Gibbs Racing	Toyota	21.099	21.211	21.459
9	1	Jamie McMurray	Chip Ganassi Racing	Chevrolet	21.179	21.262	21.499
10	18	David Ragan	Joe Gibbs Racing	Toyota	21.012	21.303	21.519
11	24	Jeff Gordon	Hendrick Motorsports	Chevrolet	21.043	21.278	21.540
12	42	Kyle Larson	Chip Ganassi Racing	Chevrolet	21.047	21.313	21.604
13	14	Tony Stewart	Stewart–Haas Racing	Chevrolet	21.197	21.358	—
14	55	Brett Moffitt (R)	Michael Waltrip Racing	Toyota	21.066	21.359	—
15	27	Paul Menard	Richard Childress Racing	Chevrolet	21.096	21.368	—
16	25	Chase Elliott (i)	Hendrick Motorsports	Chevrolet	21.115	21.373	—
17	15	Clint Bowyer	Michael Waltrip Racing	Toyota	21.199	21.376	—
18	19	Carl Edwards	Joe Gibbs Racing	Toyota	21.071	21.390	—
19	40	Landon Cassill (i)	Hillman-Circle Sport LLC	Chevrolet	21.109	21.398	—
20	3	Austin Dillon	Richard Childress Racing	Chevrolet	21.138	21.400	—
21	10	Danica Patrick	Stewart–Haas Racing	Chevrolet	21.197	21.470	—
22	51	Justin Allgaier	HScott Motorsports	Chevrolet	21.137	21.487	—
23	31	Ryan Newman	Richard Childress Racing	Chevrolet	21.096	21.512	—
24	17	Ricky Stenhouse Jr.	Roush Fenway Racing	Ford	21.195	21.607	—
25	13	Casey Mears	Germain Racing	Chevrolet	21.208	—	—
26	88	Dale Earnhardt Jr.	Hendrick Motorsports	Chevrolet	21.216	—	—
27	43	Aric Almirola	Richard Petty Motorsports	Ford	21.248	—	—
28	98	Josh Wise	Phil Parsons Racing	Ford	21.251	—	—
29	9	Sam Hornish Jr.	Richard Petty Motorsports	Ford	21.278	—	—
30	38	David Gilliland	Front Row Motorsports	Ford	21.289	—	—
31	35	Cole Whitt (Note: Cole Whitt started from the rear for a post-qualifying transmission change.)	Front Row Motorsports	Ford	21.293	—	—
32	16	Greg Biffle	Roush Fenway Racing	Ford	21.311	—	—
33	30	Jeff Green (i) (Note: Jeff Green started from the rear for changing engines.)	The Motorsports Group	Chevrolet	21.318	—	—
34	6	Trevor Bayne	Roush Fenway Racing	Ford	21.334	—	—
35	32	Joey Gase (i)	Go FAS Racing	Ford	21.337	—	—
36	48	Jimmie Johnson	Hendrick Motorsports	Chevrolet	21.341	—	—
37	83	Matt DiBenedetto (R)	BK Racing	Toyota	21.341	—	—
38	46	Michael Annett	HScott Motorsports	Chevrolet	21.352	—	—
39	23	J. J. Yeley (i) (Note: Jeb Burton, who failed to qualify in the No. 26, drove the No. 23 in place of teammate J. J. Yeley. Because of the driver change, Burton started from the rear.)	BK Racing	Toyota	21.418	—	—
40	5	Kasey Kahne	Hendrick Motorsports	Chevrolet	21.444	—	—
41	7	Alex Bowman	Tommy Baldwin Racing	Chevrolet	21.535	—	—
42	33	Alex Kennedy (R)	Hillman-Circle Sport LLC	Chevrolet	21.539	—	—
43	34	Reed Sorenson	Front Row Motorsports	Ford	21.912	—	—
Failed to qualify
44	26	Jeb Burton (R)	BK Racing	Toyota	21.511	—	—
45	62	Brendan Gaughan	Premium Motorsports	Chevrolet	21.644	—	—
Official qualifying results

== Race ==
The race was scheduled to start at 7:14 p.m. Eastern time, but the threat of bad weather moved the start up to 7:05 p.m. It was all for naught, however. NASCAR made the decision to postpone the race to Sunday at 1:16 p.m.

=== First half ===
==== Start ====
The race started at 1:19 p.m. with Joey Logano leading the field to the green flag. With all the rubber being washed away by the rain, the cars were primarily running the bottom groove. Coming out of turn 4 on lap 4, Danica Patrick got hit by Casey Mears and about spun out. She saved the car and the race remained green. Logano caught the end of the field ten laps into the race. By lap 21, Kurt Busch began reeling in the leader. By lap 42, Busch, his teammate Kevin Harvick, and Martin Truex Jr. pulled within a second of Logano. The first caution of the day flew on lap 51. This was a planned competition caution for overnight rain. The top ten in the running order entering pit road would've remained the same exiting, but Jamie McMurray, who was running eighth, had to make another pit stop for loose lug nuts. He restarted the race in 30th position.

The race restarted on lap 57. After 40 laps, Busch pulled up to the leader. Using the lapped car of Josh Wise as a pick, Busch passed to the inside of Logano to take the lead on lap 96. The second caution flew on lap 124 when Joey Gase, coming off turn 2, got turned by Aric Almirola and hit inside backstretch wall head-on. Busch swapped the lead with Harvick on pit road with his teammate pitting before the start/finish line. Busch, however, exited pit road with the lead.

==== Trouble for Josh Wise ====
The race restarted on lap 137. The third caution flew the next lap for Wise's car had stalled at the exit of pit road.

The race restarted on lap 144. The fourth caution race flew on lap 163 when Wise blew an engine. Having just rejoined the race, his No. 98 Ford went up in smoke while going into turn 1. Busch swapped the lead with Harvick on pit road. This time, however, it was Harvick who exited with the lead.

=== Second half ===
==== Halfway ====
The race restarted on lap 171 and Busch immediately took back the lead. The race went through a long green flag run with everyone settling into a rhythm. McMurray, who restarted the race earlier in 30th, eventually ran Busch down. and took the lead on lap 260. He gave it back to Busch the next lap and took it back the lap after that. While McMurrary and Busch fought for the lead, many cars began hitting pit road. McMurray gave up the lead to pit on lap 266 and gave it to Brad Keselowski. Brett Moffitt had a tire going flat and slammed the wall in turn 1. This brought out the 5th caution on lap 270. Trevor Bayne also had a tire going flat and hit the wall in turn 4. To add insult to injury for Moffitt, he was forced to restart the race from the tail-end of the field for having too many men over the wall. Fifteen cars took the waive-around, most of whom were cars running in the top ten when the caution came out.

==== Fourth quarter ====
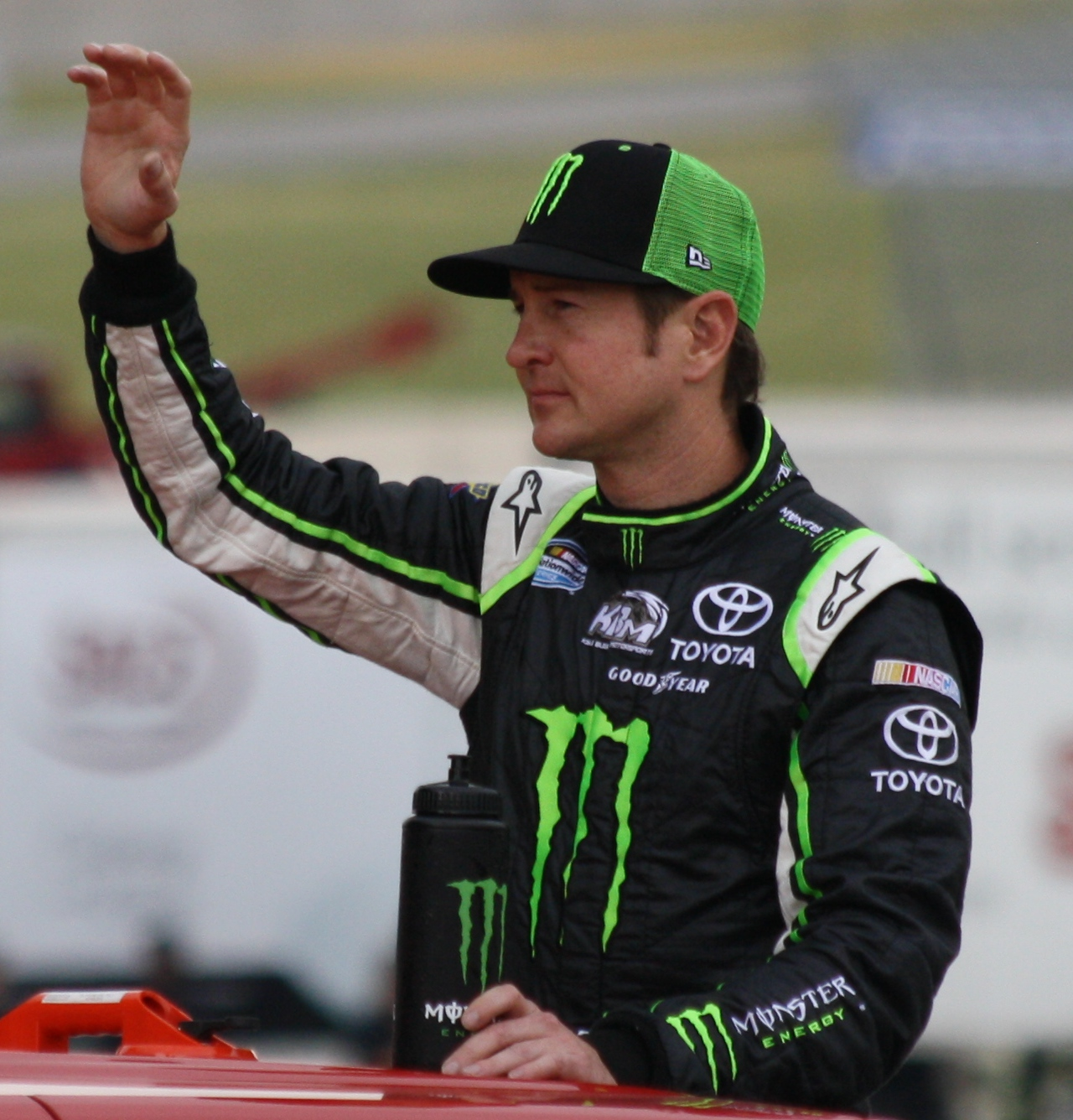
Kurt Busch, seen here in 2012, scored his 26th career win at Richmond.

The race restarted on lap 279 with Busch still in the lead. After a nearly 60 lap green run, debris in turn 3 brought out the sixth caution of the race with 50 laps to go. Kurt Busch exited pit road first to maintain the lead. Jeb Burton was forced to drop to the tail-end of the field for an uncontrolled tire.

The race restarted with 42 laps to go. The seventh caution of the race flew with 41 laps to go when Tony Stewart went spinning on the front stretch. Coming to the line, Stewart made contact with Dale Earnhardt Jr., went spinning and made contact with the inside pit wall towards turn 1. “I don’t know," Dale said after the race. "You’ll have to ask him. He hit me in the left-rear quarter panel. I was trying to clear the 51 on the outside of me, so I was as high as I could go. You’ll have to ask him.” "I mean, he hit me right here. I ain't got that good of a peripheral vision. Pretty good, but not that good. Well, it's never his fault. I was doing everything I needed to do. I didn't drive under, I didn't drive into him, I didn't move my line at all. He's gotta take a little ownership in what happened there."

The race restarted with 33 laps to go and caution flew for the eighth time when Jeb Burton got turned on the backstretch. He was rear-ended by Sam Hornish Jr. exiting turn 2.

The race restarted with 26 laps to go and Kurt Busch drove off scoring the 26th victory of his career.

=== Post-race ===
==== Driver comments ====
“It’s an incredible feeling,” said Busch. “It’s a total team effort. And the way that everything came together just seemed like we were building and building and building towards a great finish like this. And I have this opportunity because of Gene Haas and everybody that’s part of our family at Stewart-Haas. It’s an unbelievable feeling when you pull deep from within and you go through troubles and you know, when you’re accused of something and things go sideways, your personal life doesn’t need to affect your business life.”

=== Race results ===
Pos	No.	Driver	Team	Manufacturer	Laps	Points
1	41	Kurt Busch	Stewart–Haas Racing	Chevrolet	400	48
2	4	Kevin Harvick	Stewart–Haas Racing	Chevrolet	400	43
3	48	Jimmie Johnson	Hendrick Motorsports	Chevrolet	400	41
4	1	Jamie McMurray	Chip Ganassi Racing	Chevrolet	400	40
5	22	Joey Logano	Team Penske	Ford	400	40
6	5	Kasey Kahne	Hendrick Motorsports	Chevrolet	400	38
7	20	Matt Kenseth	Joe Gibbs Racing	Toyota	400	37
8	24	Jeff Gordon	Hendrick Motorsports	Chevrolet	400	36
9	15	Clint Bowyer	Michael Waltrip Racing	Toyota	400	35
10	78	Martin Truex Jr.	Furniture Row Racing	Chevrolet	400	34
11	31	Ryan Newman	Richard Childress Racing	Chevrolet	400	33
12	42	Kyle Larson	Chip Ganassi Racing	Chevrolet	400	32
13	47	A. J. Allmendinger	JTG Daugherty Racing	Chevrolet	400	31
14	88	Dale Earnhardt Jr.	Hendrick Motorsports	Chevrolet	400	30
15	27	Paul Menard	Richard Childress Racing	Chevrolet	400	29
16	25	Chase Elliott (i)	Hendrick Motorsports	Chevrolet	400	0
17	2	Brad Keselowski	Team Penske	Ford	400	28
18	51	Justin Allgaier	HScott Motorsports	Chevrolet	400	26
19	19	Carl Edwards	Joe Gibbs Racing	Toyota	400	25
20	43	Aric Almirola	Richard Petty Motorsports	Ford	399	24
21	16	Greg Biffle	Roush Fenway Racing	Ford	398	23
22	11	Denny Hamlin	Joe Gibbs Racing	Toyota	398	22
23	18	David Ragan	Joe Gibbs Racing	Toyota	398	21
24	6	Trevor Bayne	Roush Fenway Racing	Ford	398	20
25	10	Danica Patrick	Stewart–Haas Racing	Chevrolet	398	19
26	40	Landon Cassill (i)	Hillman-Circle Sport LLC	Chevrolet	398	0
27	3	Austin Dillon	Richard Childress Racing	Chevrolet	398	17
28	17	Ricky Stenhouse Jr.	Roush Fenway Racing	Ford	398	16
29	55	Brett Moffitt (R)	Michael Waltrip Racing	Toyota	396	15
30	13	Casey Mears	Germain Racing	Chevrolet	396	14
31	38	David Gilliland	Front Row Motorsports	Ford	396	13
32	7	Alex Bowman	Tommy Baldwin Racing	Chevrolet	396	12
33	46	Michael Annett	HScott Motorsports	Chevrolet	395	11
34	34	Reed Sorenson	Front Row Motorsports	Ford	395	10
35	9	Sam Hornish Jr.	Richard Petty Motorsports	Ford	394	9
36	35	Cole Whitt	Front Row Motorsports	Ford	394	8
37	83	Matt DiBenedetto (R)	BK Racing	Toyota	394	7
38	23	Jeb Burton (R)	BK Racing	Toyota	393	6
39	33	Alex Kennedy (R)	Hillman-Circle Sport LLC	Chevrolet	392	5
40	30	Jeff Green (i)	The Motorsports Group	Chevrolet	386	4
41	14	Tony Stewart	Stewart–Haas Racing	Chevrolet	359	3
42	98	Josh Wise	Phil Parsons Racing	Ford	137	2
43	32	Joey Gase (i)	Go FAS Racing	Ford	124	0
Official Toyota Owners 400 results

=== Race statistics ===
- 12 lead changes among 5 different drivers
- 8 cautions for 53 laps
- Time of race: 3 hours, 05 minutes, 16 seconds
- Average speed: 97.157 mph (156.359 km/h)
- Kurt Busch took home $221,240 in winnings

Lap Leaders
Laps	Leader
1-94	Joey Logano
95-129	Kurt Busch
130	Kevin Harvick
131-164	Kurt Busch
165	Kevin Harvick
166-258	Kurt Busch
259	Jamie McMurray
260-261	Kurt Busch
262-264	Jamie McMurray
265-272	Brad Keselowski
273-352	Kurt Busch
353	Brad Keselowski
354-400	Kurt Busch

Total laps led
Leader	Laps
Kurt Busch	291
Joey Logano	94
Brad Keselowski	9
Jamie McMurray	4
Kevin Harvick	2

==== Race awards ====
- Coors Light Pole Award: Joey Logano (21.248, 127.071 mph (204.501 km/h))
- 3M Lap Leader: Kurt Busch (291 laps)
- American Ethanol Green Flag Restart Award: Kurt Busch (22.082, 122.273 mph (196.779 km/h))
- Duralast Brakes "Bake In The Race" Award: Joey Logano
- Freescale "Wide Open": Jimmie Johnson
- Ingersoll Rand Power Move: Ryan Newman (5 positions)
- MAHLE Clevite Engine Builder of the Race: Hendrick Engines, #41
- Mobil 1 Driver of the Race: Kurt Busch (148.1 driver rating)
- Moog Steering and Suspension Problem Solver of The Race: Jamie McMurray (crew chief Matt McCall (-0.069))
- NASCAR Sprint Cup Leader Bonus: No winner: rolls over to $60,000 at next event
- Sherwin-Williams Fastest Lap: A. J. Allmendinger (Lap 4, 21.659 124.657 mph (200.616 km/h))
- Sunoco Rookie of The Race: Brett Moffitt

== Media ==
=== Television ===
Fox Sports covered their 15th race at Richmond International Raceway. Mike Joy, Larry McReynolds and six-time Richmond winner Darrell Waltrip had the call in the booth for the race. Jamie Little, Chris Neville and Matt Yocum handled the pit road duties for the television side.

Fox
Booth announcers	Pit reporters
Lap-by-lap: Mike Joy; Color-commentator: Larry McReynolds; Color commentator: Darrell Waltrip	Jamie Little; Chris Neville; Matt Yocum

=== Radio ===
MRN had the radio call for the race, which was simulcast on Sirius XM NASCAR Radio. Joe Moore and Jeff Striegle called the race in the booth when the field was racing down the front stretch. Mike Bagley called the race from a platform inside of turn 3 on the backstretch when the field was racing down the backstretch. Alex Hayden, Winston Kelley and Steve Post worked pit road for MRN.

MRN
Booth announcers	Turn announcers	Pit reporters
Lead announcer: Joe Moore; Announcer: Jeff Striegle	Backstretch: Mike Bagley	Alex Hayden; Winston Kelley; Steve Post

== Standings after the race ==
Drivers' Championship standings

	Pos	Driver	Points
	1	Kevin Harvick	357
	2	Joey Logano	324 (-33)
	3	Martin Truex Jr.	315 (-42)
	4	Jimmie Johnson	299 (-58)
	5	Brad Keselowski	283 (-74)
1	6	Kasey Kahne	275 (-82)
1	7	Matt Kenseth	273 (-84)
2	8	Dale Earnhardt Jr.	271 (-86)
3	9	Jamie McMurray	264 (-93)
1	10	Jeff Gordon	263 (-94)
1	11	Aric Almirola	250 (-107)
1	12	Denny Hamlin	245 (-112)
1	13	Paul Menard	239 (-118)
3	14	Clint Bowyer	235 (-122)
1	15	Ryan Newman	234 (-123)
3	16	Danica Patrick	230 (-127)

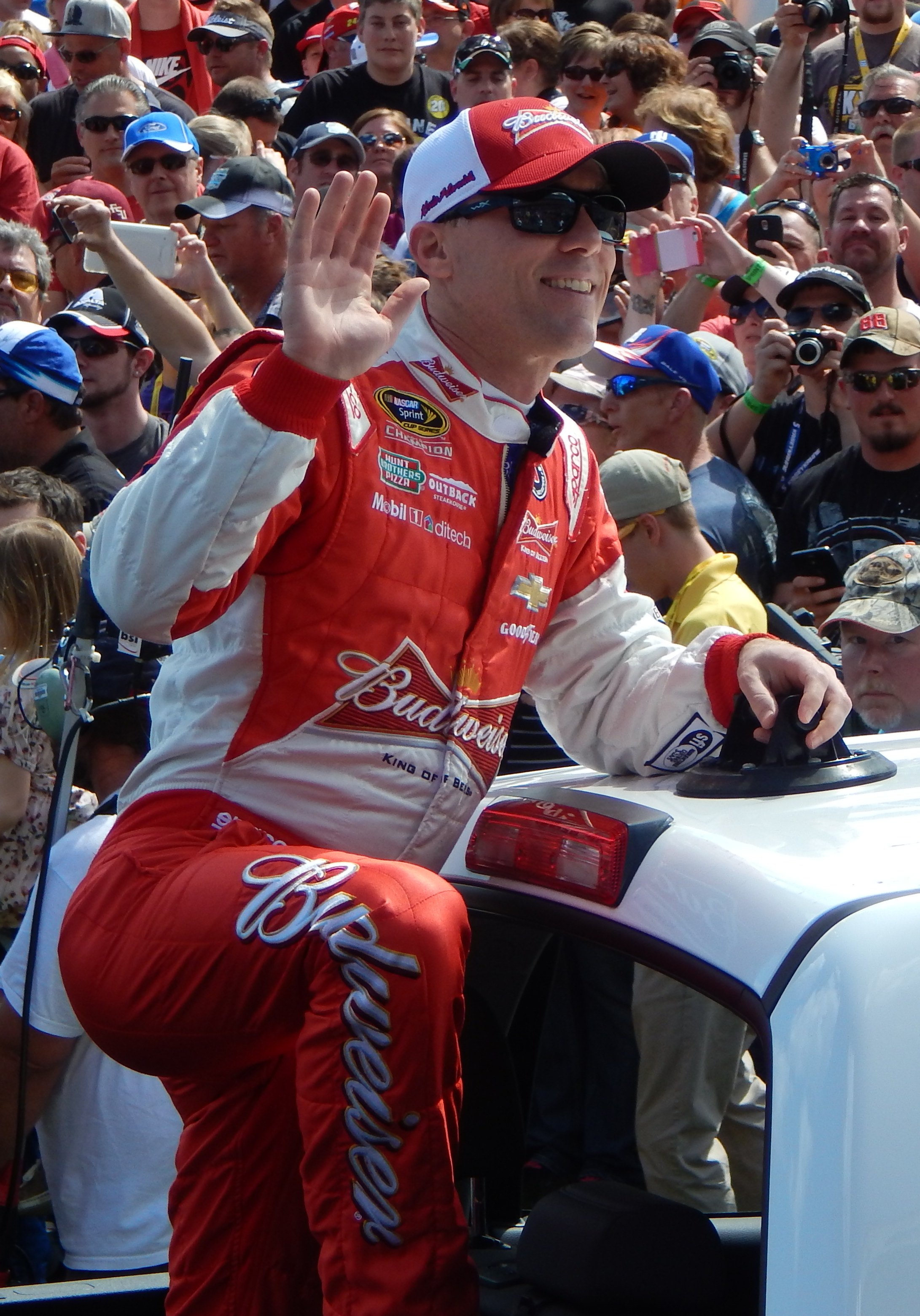
Kevin Harvick left Richmond with a 33-point lead over Joey Logano.

Manufacturers' Championship standings

Pos	Manufacturer	Points
1	Chevrolet	405
2	Ford	376 (-29)
3	Toyota	348 (-57)

- Note: Only the first sixteen positions are included for the driver standings.

== Notes ==
Previous race: 2015 Food City 500	Sprint Cup Series; 2015 season	Next race: 2015 GEICO 500
