= 2015 GEICO 500 =

Race details
- Race 10 of 36 in the 2015 NASCAR Sprint Cup Series
- Official logo for the race
- Date: May 3, 2015
- Location: Talladega Superspeedway in Lincoln, Alabama
- Course: Permanent racing facility
- Course length: 2.66 miles (4.28 km)
- Distance: 188 laps, 500.08 mi (804.8 km)
- Weather: Sunny, clear blue skies with a temperature of 76 °F (24 °C); wind out of the south/southwest at 5 mph (8.0 km/h)
- Average speed: 159.487 mph (256.669 km/h)

Pole position
| Driver | Jeff Gordon | Hendrick Motorsports |
- Time: 49.160

Most laps led
| Driver | Dale Earnhardt Jr. | Hendrick Motorsports |
- Laps: 67

Winner
| No. 88 | Dale Earnhardt Jr. | Hendrick Motorsports |

Television in the United States
- Network: Fox
- Announcers: Mike Joy, Larry McReynolds and Darrell Waltrip
- Nielsen ratings: 3.8/7 (Overnight); 4.0/7 (Final); 6.3 Million viewers

Radio in the United States
- Radio: MRN
- Booth announcers: Joe Moore, Jeff Striegle and Rusty Wallace
- Turn announcers: Dave Moody (1 & 2), Mike Bagley (Backstretch) and Kyle Rickey (3 & 4)

The 2015 GEICO 500 was a NASCAR Sprint Cup Series race held on May 3, 2015 at Talladega Superspeedway in Lincoln, Alabama. Contested over 188 laps on the 2.66 mile (4.28 km) asphalt superspeedway, it was the tenth race of the 2015 NASCAR Sprint Cup season. Dale Earnhardt Jr. won the race, his first win of the season and his sixth at Talladega Superspeedway and first at the racetrack since 2004. His teammate Jimmie Johnson finished second, while Paul Menard, Ryan Blaney and Martin Truex Jr. rounded out the Top five.

Jeff Gordon won the pole for the race, the 80th of his career and fourth at the track. He led 47 laps before getting caught in a last lap wreck on his way to a 31st-place finish. Teammate Dale Earnhardt Jr. led a race high of 67 laps. The race had 27 lead changes among 15 different drivers, as well as six cautions for 23 laps. There was one red flag period for eleven minutes and 32 seconds.

This was the 24th career victory for Dale Earnhardt Jr., sixth at Talladega Superspeedway and twelfth at the track for Hendrick Motorsports. The win moved Junior up to fifth in the points standings. Chevrolet left Talladega with a 37-point lead over Ford in the manufacturer standings.

The GEICO 500 was carried by Fox Sports on the broadcast Fox network for the American television audience. The radio broadcast for the race was carried by the Motor Racing Network and Sirius XM NASCAR Radio.

== Report ==
=== Background ===
Talladega Superspeedway, the track where the race was held.

Talladega Superspeedway, originally known as Alabama International Motor Superspeedway (AIMS), is a motorsports complex located north of Talladega, Alabama. It is located on the former Anniston Air Force Base in the small city of Lincoln. The track is a Tri-oval and was constructed by International Speedway Corporation, a business controlled by the France Family, in the 1960s. Talladega is most known for its steep banking and the unique location of the start/finish line - located just past the exit to pit road. The track currently hosts the NASCAR series such as the Sprint Cup Series, Xfinity Series, and the Camping World Truck Series. Talladega Superspeedway is the longest NASCAR oval with a length of 2.66 miles (4.28 km), and the track at its peak had a seating capacity of 175,000 spectators, although the current capacity is 80,000 seats.

Kevin Harvick entered Talladega with a 33-point lead over Joey Logano following his runner-up finish the week before at Richmond. Martin Truex Jr. entered 42 back. Jimmie Johnson entered 58 back. Brad Keselowski entered 74 back.

==== Changes to qualifying ====
On March 30, 2015, in response to a series of accidents that happened during pole qualifying at the Daytona 500, NASCAR made changes to the qualifying format for all three national series at the restrictor plate tracks. Qualifying for both the spring and fall Talladega races, as well as the July events at Daytona International Speedway, will consist of the following:

* Two rounds of qualifying, with the top twelve posted lap speeds advancing to the second round
* Race vehicles taking one, timed lap in each round of qualifying
* Each race vehicle will be released in a predetermined timed interval as determined by NASCAR, with the sanctioning body reserving the right to have more than one vehicle engaging in qualifying runs at the same time
* Qualifying order for the first round will be determined by a random draw; final round qualifying order is determined by slowest to fastest speeds from the first round
* A ten-minute break will occur between the first qualifying round and the final round
* Upon completion of the first qualifying round, the field will be set with positions 13 and beyond determined from first round qualifying speed
* The twelve fastest vehicles from the first round will have their speeds reset for the final round with starting positions 1-12 determined by the fastest laps in the final round
* NASCAR will impound race vehicles following each qualifying lap; vehicles advancing to the final round will be allowed to adjust tape and utilize a cool-down unit during the ten minute break only

“When you look at superspeedway racing, when we had conversations with the garage area, and you really determined that through no fault of a driver, there’s potential that an accident could take place – they could have the fastest car on the track and really through no fault of their own through an accident could fail to qualify for a race,’’ O’Donnell said. When we looked at that, especially in Daytona, that’s a circumstance we wanted to try to avoid if we could. We’re able to put this together, which is a little combination of (single-car and group qualifying) and puts it more in the driver’s hand for a superspeedway, which we like to see.’’

— NASCAR Executive Vice-President Steve O'Donnell speaking on Sirius XM NASCAR Radio.

While no official announcement was made on how many cars would be on track at once, Steve O'Donnell, NASCAR's executive vice president and chief racing development officer, said they would likely do two cars at a time to Mike Bagley and Pete Pistone in his weekly Monday appearance on the Sirius XM NASCAR Radio program "The Morning Drive." He also discussed with the show's hosts why NASCAR made the change.

==== Entry list ====
The entry list for the GEICO 500 was released on Sunday, April 26, 2015 at 2:35 p.m. Eastern time. Forty-five cars were entered for the race. David Ragan drove his final race in the No. 18 Joe Gibbs Racing Toyota. He took over the No. 55 Toyota at Michael Waltrip Racing as a season replacement for Brian Vickers the following race at Kansas Speedway. The No. 21 Wood Brothers Racing Ford, driven by Ryan Blaney, entered its first race since the Duck Commander 500 at Texas Motor Speedway. After giving his seat to Jeb Burton the previous race at Richmond International Raceway, J. J. Yeley returned to the No. 23 BK Racing Toyota. Bobby Labonte made his second start of the season driving the No. 32 Go FAS Racing Ford. The No. 33 Hillman-Circle Sport LLC that had been driven by Alex Kennedy was driven by Brian Scott. Chris Buescher returned to the No. 34 Front Row Motorsports Ford that had been driven by Reed Sorenson. Michael Waltrip drove the No. 55 Michael Waltrip Racing Toyota that had been driven by Brett Moffitt. The No. 95 Leavine Family Racing Ford, driven by Michael McDowell, entered its first race since the Food City 500 at Bristol Motor Speedway.

| No. | Driver | Team | Manufacturer |
|---|---|---|---|
| 1 | Jamie McMurray | Chip Ganassi Racing | Chevrolet |
| 2 | Brad Keselowski (PC3) | Team Penske | Ford |
| 3 | Austin Dillon | Richard Childress Racing | Chevrolet |
| 4 | Kevin Harvick (PC1) | Stewart–Haas Racing | Chevrolet |
| 5 | Kasey Kahne | Hendrick Motorsports | Chevrolet |
| 6 | Trevor Bayne | Roush Fenway Racing | Ford |
| 7 | Regan Smith | Tommy Baldwin Racing | Chevrolet |
| 9 | Sam Hornish Jr. | Richard Petty Motorsports | Ford |
| 10 | Danica Patrick | Stewart–Haas Racing | Chevrolet |
| 11 | Denny Hamlin | Joe Gibbs Racing | Toyota |
| 13 | Casey Mears | Germain Racing | Chevrolet |
| 14 | Tony Stewart (PC4) | Stewart–Haas Racing | Chevrolet |
| 15 | Clint Bowyer | Michael Waltrip Racing | Toyota |
| 16 | Greg Biffle | Roush Fenway Racing | Ford |
| 17 | Ricky Stenhouse Jr. | Roush Fenway Racing | Ford |
| 18 | David Ragan | Joe Gibbs Racing | Toyota |
| 19 | Carl Edwards | Joe Gibbs Racing | Toyota |
| 20 | Matt Kenseth (PC6) | Joe Gibbs Racing | Toyota |
| 21 | Ryan Blaney (i) | Wood Brothers Racing | Ford |
| 22 | Joey Logano | Team Penske | Ford |
| 23 | David Ragan (i) | BK Racing | Toyota |
| 24 | Jeff Gordon | Hendrick Motorsports | Chevrolet |
| 26 | Jeb Burton (R) | BK Racing | Toyota |
| 27 | Paul Menard | Richard Childress Racing | Chevrolet |
| 31 | Ryan Newman | Richard Childress Racing | Chevrolet |
| 32 | Bobby Labonte (PC8) | Go FAS Racing | Ford |
| 33 | Brian Scott (i) | Hillman-Circle Sport LLC | Chevrolet |
| 34 | Chris Buescher (i) | Front Row Motorsports | Ford |
| 35 | Cole Whitt | Front Row Motorsports | Ford |
| 38 | David Gilliland | Front Row Motorsports | Ford |
| 40 | Landon Cassill (i) | Hillman-Circle Sport LLC | Chevrolet |
| 41 | Kurt Busch (PC5) | Stewart–Haas Racing | Chevrolet |
| 42 | Kyle Larson | Chip Ganassi Racing | Chevrolet |
| 43 | Aric Almirola | Richard Petty Motorsports | Ford |
| 46 | Michael Annett | HScott Motorsports | Chevrolet |
| 47 | A. J. Allmendinger | JTG Daugherty Racing | Chevrolet |
| 48 | Alex Bowman (PC2) | Hendrick Motorsports | Chevrolet |
| 51 | Justin Allgaier | HScott Motorsports | Chevrolet |
| 55 | Michael Waltrip | Michael Waltrip Racing | Toyota |
| 62 | Brendan Gaughan (i) | Premium Motorsports | Chevrolet |
| 78 | Martin Truex Jr. | Furniture Row Racing | Chevrolet |
| 83 | Matt DiBenedetto (R) | BK Racing | Toyota |
| 88 | Dale Earnhardt Jr. | Hendrick Motorsports | Chevrolet |
| 95 | Michael McDowell | Leavine Family Racing | Ford |
| 98 | Josh Wise | Phil Parsons Racing | Ford |
Official entry list

| Key | Meaning |
|---|---|
| (R) | Rookie |
| (i) | Ineligible for points |
| (PC#) | Past champions provisional |

== Practice ==
=== First practice ===
Ricky Stenhouse Jr. was the fastest in the first practice session with a time of 47.694 and a speed of 200.780 mph (323.124 km/h).

| Pos | No. | Driver | Team | Manufacturer | Time | Speed |
|---|---|---|---|---|---|---|
| 1 | 17 | Ricky Stenhouse Jr. | Roush Fenway Racing | Ford | 47.694 | 200.780 |
| 2 | 55 | Michael Waltrip | Michael Waltrip Racing | Toyota | 47.703 | 200.742 |
| 3 | 34 | Chris Buescher (i) | Front Row Motorsports | Ford | 47.816 | 200.268 |
Official first practice results

=== Final practice ===
Greg Biffle was the fastest in the final practice session with a time of 48.381 and a speed of 197.929 mph (318.536 km/h).

| Pos | No. | Driver | Team | Manufacturer | Time | Speed |
|---|---|---|---|---|---|---|
| 1 | 16 | Greg Biffle | Roush Fenway Racing | Ford | 48.381 | 197.929 |
| 2 | 14 | Tony Stewart | Stewart–Haas Racing | Chevrolet | 48.398 | 197.859 |
| 3 | 43 | Aric Almirola | Richard Petty Motorsports | Ford | 48.438 | 197.696 |
Official final practice results

== Qualifying ==
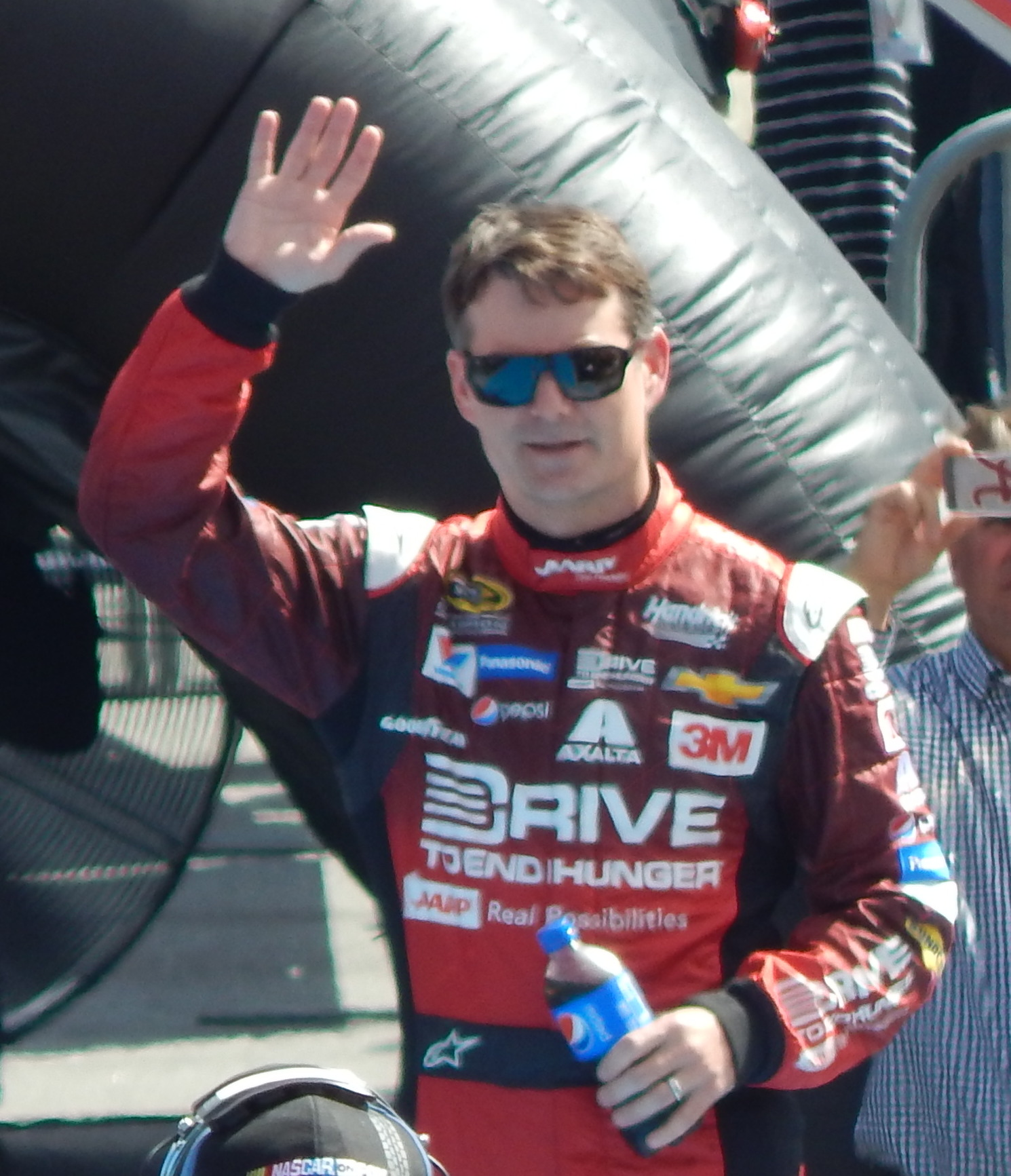
Jeff Gordon, seen here at the 2015 Daytona 500, scored the 80th pole of his career at Talladega.

Jeff Gordon won the pole with a time of 49.160 and a speed of 194.793 mph (313.489 km/h). This was the 80th pole in Gordon's career. "I am so proud of this pole because we got the pole in Daytona, but it was a totally different format," Gordon said. "I knew the car was fast there. For this team to bring another car, a different car here, and all the hard work from the engine shop and what they do with the bodies, and chassis and prep." "The Hendrick cars are really strong, and the engines are running great," Kasey Kahne said after qualifying second. "Our Farmers Insurance Chevy was fast right there. I told Jeff I was coming to the front row. I knew I wouldn't beat him because he is really quick, but I knew we could get up to second. I was really happy with that. It is a good starting spot. Hopefully tomorrow we stay out of trouble and we are there at the end and have a shot." "We’ve got pretty good speed in our Ford and it’s just nice to be back with this Wood Brothers team," Ryan Blaney said after qualifying third. "I’ve definitely been itching to get back to the track and it’s cool to finally be back here and have a good car, too. This team really needs a good finish. After having a good car at Texas and blowing up early that really kind of brought us down, so we’ll try to run all the laps tomorrow and see if we can pick this team up a little bit before Charlotte.” Defending race winner Denny Hamlin qualified 17th. “I think it’s good. It goes faster," Hamlin said. "Definitely rewards the guys that worked hard in the shop. I think that we’re a little faster than what we usually are, but definitely disappointed. I thought we would have made it to the final round, but some of our teammates did, some of them didn’t. It’s just all on what you’ve got, but I think we’ll be okay in the race.” Jeb Burton and Michael McDowell failed to qualify for the race.

=== Qualifying results ===
| Pos | No. | Driver | Team | Manufacturer | R1 | R2 |
|---|---|---|---|---|---|---|
| 1 | 24 | Jeff Gordon | Hendrick Motorsports | Chevrolet | 49.171 | 49.160 |
| 2 | 5 | Kasey Kahne | Hendrick Motorsports | Chevrolet | 49.577 | 49.441 |
| 3 | 21 | Ryan Blaney | Wood Brothers Racing | Ford | 49.508 | 49.460 |
| 4 | 88 | Dale Earnhardt Jr. | Hendrick Motorsports | Chevrolet | 49.587 | 49.463 |
| 5 | 48 | Jimmie Johnson | Hendrick Motorsports | Chevrolet | 49.601 | 49.507 |
| 6 | 14 | Tony Stewart | Stewart–Haas Racing | Chevrolet | 49.634 | 49.509 |
| 7 | 27 | Paul Menard | Richard Childress Racing | Chevrolet | 49.496 | 49.511 |
| 8 | 20 | Matt Kenseth | Joe Gibbs Racing | Toyota | 49.508 | 49.525 |
| 9 | 18 | David Ragan | Joe Gibbs Racing | Toyota | 49.591 | 49.615 |
| 10 | 15 | Clint Bowyer | Michael Waltrip Racing | Toyota | 49.667 | 49.666 |
| 11 | 13 | Casey Mears | Germain Racing | Chevrolet | 49.654 | 49.693 |
| 12 | 9 | Sam Hornish Jr. | Richard Petty Motorsports | Ford | 49.623 | 49.786 |
| 13 | 42 | Kyle Larson | Chip Ganassi Racing | Chevrolet | 49.670 | — |
| 14 | 3 | Austin Dillon | Richard Childress Racing | Chevrolet | 49.671 | — |
| 15 | 2 | Brad Keselowski | Team Penske | Ford | 49.674 | — |
| 16 | 33 | Brian Scott (i) | Hillman-Circle Sport LLC | Chevrolet | 49.677 | — |
| 17 | 11 | Denny Hamlin | Joe Gibbs Racing | Toyota | 49.684 | — |
| 18 | 31 | Ryan Newman | Richard Childress Racing | Chevrolet | 49.690 | — |
| 19 | 41 | Kurt Busch | Stewart–Haas Racing | Chevrolet | 49.699 | — |
| 20 | 16 | Greg Biffle | Roush Fenway Racing | Ford | 49.701 | — |
| 21 | 22 | Joey Logano | Team Penske | Ford | 49.714 | — |
| 22 | 19 | Carl Edwards | Joe Gibbs Racing | Toyota | 49.723 | — |
| 23 | 55 | Michael Waltrip | Michael Waltrip Racing | Toyota | 49.828 | — |
| 24 | 4 | Kevin Harvick | Stewart–Haas Racing | Chevrolet | 49.862 | — |
| 25 | 10 | Danica Patrick | Stewart–Haas Racing | Chevrolet | 49.918 | — |
| 26 | 6 | Trevor Bayne | Roush Fenway Racing | Ford | 49.946 | — |
| 27 | 1 | Jamie McMurray | Chip Ganassi Racing | Chevrolet | 49.972 | — |
| 28 | 43 | Aric Almirola | Richard Petty Motorsports | Ford | 49.975 | — |
| 29 | 17 | Ricky Stenhouse Jr. | Roush Fenway Racing | Ford | 49.984 | — |
| 30 | 40 | Landon Cassill (i) | Hillman-Circle Sport LLC | Chevrolet | 50.006 | — |
| 31 | 47 | A. J. Allmendinger | JTG Daugherty Racing | Chevrolet | 50.070 | — |
| 32 | 32 | Bobby Labonte | Go FAS Racing | Ford | 50.090 | — |
| 33 | 62 | Brendan Gaughan (i) | Premium Motorsports | Chevrolet | 50.132 | — |
| 34 | 98 | Josh Wise | Phil Parsons Racing | Ford | 50.200 | — |
| 35 | 51 | Justin Allgaier | HScott Motorsports | Chevrolet | 50.205 | — |
| 36 | 78 | Martin Truex Jr. | Furniture Row Racing | Chevrolet | 50.211 | — |
| 37 | 7 | Alex Bowman | Tommy Baldwin Racing | Chevrolet | 50.235 | — |
| 38 | 34 | Chris Buescher (i) | Front Row Motorsports | Ford | 50.292 | — |
| 39 | 38 | David Gilliland | Front Row Motorsports | Ford | 50.327 | — |
| 40 | 46 | Michael Annett | HScott Motorsports | Chevrolet | 50.361 | — |
| 41 | 35 | Cole Whitt | Front Row Motorsports | Ford | 50.466 | — |
| 42 | 23 | J. J. Yeley (i) | BK Racing | Toyota | 50.602 | — |
| 43 | 83 | Matt DiBenedetto | BK Racing | Toyota | 50.707 | — |
Failed to qualify
| 44 | 95 | Michael McDowell | Leavine Family Racing | Ford | 50.548 | — |
| 45 | 26 | Jeb Burton (R) | BK Racing | Toyota | 50.672 | — |
Official qualifying results

== Race ==
=== First half ===
==== Start ====
The race was scheduled to start at 1:20 p.m., but started a minute late at 1:21 p.m. when Jeff Gordon led the field to the green flag. He led the first three laps before giving the lead to teammate Kasey Kahne on the fourth circuit. Tony Stewart pulled out on front of Kahne take the lead 8. Dale Earnhardt Jr. used the outside lane to pass Stewart for the lead on lap 13. Going down the Alabama Gang Superstretch (backstretch), Jeff Gordon used a slingshot move to pass his teammate for the lead on lap 17. The first caution of the race flew on lap 19 for a two car wreck in turn 1 involving Brian Scott and Michael Waltrip. Coming across the start/finish line, Scott's engine expired and spun out in turn 1. Joey Logano was able to avoid t-boning the No. 33 car, but Waltrip was not so lucky. Kevin Harvick opted not to pit and took over the lead. He would end up pitting the next lap and Justin Allgaier assumed the lead. He too would pit and Bobby Labonte took the lead. Finally, Labonte pitted and Jeff Gordon cycled back to the lead.

==== First restart and the "Big One" ====
The race restarted on lap 25. Gordon got a push from teammate Jimmie Johnson to jump ahead of teammate Dale Earnhardt Jr. After five laps, the field bunched up to form a single file train riding the top line around the track. That didn't last for long as all the cars behind fifth place Ricky Stenhouse Jr. formed a second line on the bottom, That grew a third line in the middle lane. The second caution of the race flew on lap 47 for a huge crash that began in turn 2 and continued down the backstretch. Paul Menard and Kurt Busch went to the outside and inside of Trevor Bayne that got his car aero loose exiting turn 2 and turned up into the wall. Joey Logano, trying to avoid hitting Bayne, got rear-ended and turned by Kasey Kahne. He turned down into Landon Cassill who came up right in front of Kyle Larson and destroyed the front of the No. 42 car. He hit him again going backwards riding the wall. Ricky Stenhouse Jr. hooked Larson into the wall turning down the track trying to avoid him. Greg Biffle turned down onto the apron to avoid hitting Logano, but he overcorrected and turned up into the outside wall. He came across the nose of Kevin Harvick and dented the nose of his car. Biffle's car turned back down towards the runoff area and got t-boned by David Ragan. Danica Patrick was hit by the unyielding Almirola No. 43 car and spun out at the start of the wreck trying to avoid Bayne. She suffered minimal if any damage due to her incredible car control and continued onward. Matt DiBenedetto drove through the center of the wreck and spun out trying to avoid hitting Larson. He too suffered minimal if any damage and continued the race. The 15 cars caught up were Justin Allgaier, Aric Almirola, Trevor Bayne, Greg Biffle, Alex Bowman, Kurt Busch, Landon Cassill, Matt DiBenedetto, Brendan Gaughan, Kevin Harvick, Kasey Kahne, Joey Logano, Danica Patrick, David Ragan, Ricky Stenhouse Jr., Tony Stewart and Josh Wise. "It felt like the 27 (Menard) was really tight on our door and it sucked us around," Bayne said. "Our car was a little loose, but we had a fast racecar today. I hate that a lot of cars got torn up. Maybe I could have got down a little bit before the 27 (Menard) came by, but it all happened so fast." "I didn't see a whole lot," said Larson. "I saw the No. 6 (Bayne) get sideways in front of me. I don't know if somebody got in to him or not, or if he just got the air taken off of him. From there just trying to miss the wrecks and I thought I was going to clear it all then the No. 40 (Cassill) started coming back up the track and I clipped him. It's tough. We haven't had many very good runs this year and then I missed that race in Martinsville, so these bad finishes aren't really helping us out for points." "Just one of those things at Talladega – if you’re not up in the top-two or three or if you’re not running 38th to 40th then you’re very subject to being involved in some accidents like that," Ragan said. "Just in the wrong place at the wrong time, but had a good run with the 18 guys. Have to thank everybody at Joe Gibbs Racing for the opportunity and wish it would have worked out a little bit better.” David Gilliland opted not to pit under the caution, The field was stopped down the back stretch as the race was red-flagged.

==== Green flag run ====
After an 11-minute 15 second delay, the field was running 4 laps under caution, The race restarted on lap 52. The field formed up three lines of racing. A piece of sheet metal on the backstretch brought out the third caution of the race on lap 55.

The race restarted on lap 59. By lap 70, the first seven cars broke away from the rest of the field. This didn't last for long as the field reeled in the breakaway group and formed a line on the outside to pull up to the leader. Despite most of the cars running the outer line, they couldn't pull up past the seventh place car of Denny Hamlin. Eventually though, the outside line led by Matt Kenseth started pulling up towards the fourth place car of Brad Keselowski. Jimmie Johnson and the first three jumped up to the top line and the bottom lane eventually began breaking up. The fourth caution of the race flew on lap 91 when Brendan Gaughan slammed the wall in turn 2. He had a right-front tire blowout that sent his car straight into the wall. The leaders then came to the pits and Jeff Gordon exited pit road in the lead. Casey Mears was penalized for an uncontrolled tire and restarted the race from the tail-end of the field.

=== Second half ===
==== Halfway ====
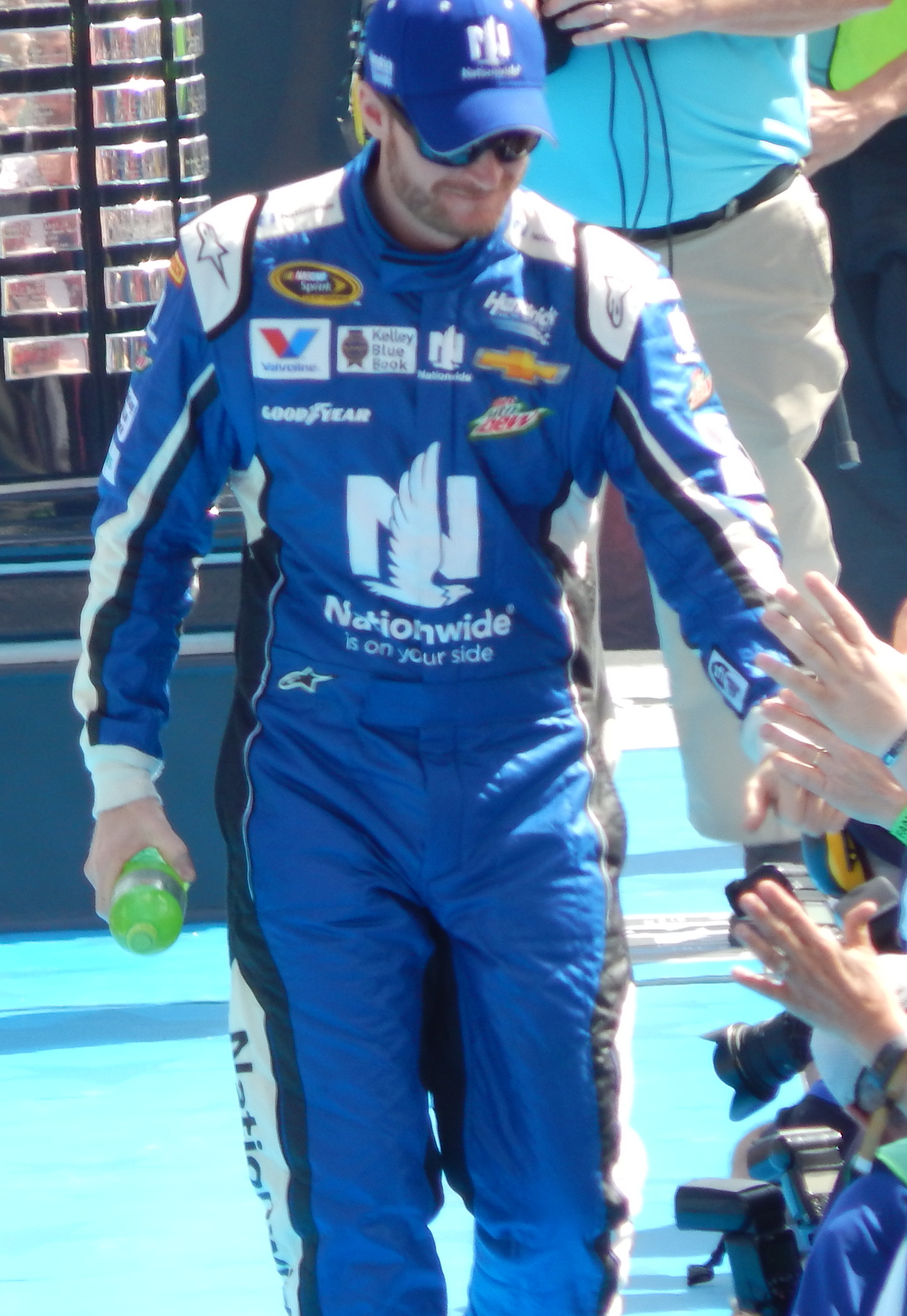
Dale Earnhardt Jr., seen here at the 2015 Daytona 500, scored the victory at Talladega.

The race restarted on lap 96. Jimmie Johnson used the outside line to take the lead on lap 97. Gordon used the inside line to take the lead on lap 98. Exiting turn 4, Dale Earnhardt Jr. left teammate Gordon hanging, moved to the top line and pushed other teammate Johnson to the lead on lap 99. He was left hanging when Denny Hamlin and Dale Earnhardt Jr. went to both sides and sent him backwards. Hamlin would take the lead on lap 105. Going underneath Hamlin in turn 2, Dale Earnhardt Jr. took the lead on lap 108. J. J. Yeley was blacked flagged for his window net being down. Compounding this, he was tagged for speeding on pit road and forced to serve a drive-through penalty. Jeff Gordon went outside of Earnhardt in the tri-oval and took the lead on lap 111. Debris in turn 3 brought out the fifth caution of the race on lap 115. Kevin Harvick was tagged for his crew being over the wall too soon and restarted from the tail-end of the field.

The race restarted on lap 119. The field fanned out and formed three lanes of racing. Dale Earnhardt Jr. went underneath Jeff Gordon exiting turn 4 and took the lead with 64 laps to go. Tony Stewart went under Earnhardt in turn 4 to take the lead with 40 laps to go. Dale powered ahead to take it back with 39 laps to go. He gave up the lead to make his final stop with 33 laps to go and handed the lead to Denny Hamlin. The sixth caution of the race flew with 31 laps to go when Austin Dillon's car caught fire in the tri-oval. The fire was coming from the right-front tire area and he brought his car to a stop near the start/finish line. Jeff Gordon and Josh Wise were tagged for speeding on pit road and restarted the race from the tail-end of the field. Greg Biffle was tagged for speeding and restarted the race from the tail-end of the field. Cole Whitt opted not to pit and restarted the race as the leader.

==== Final laps ====
The race restarted with 26 laps to go. Whitt was no match for Dale Earnhardt Jr. who passed him with ease and took the lead with 25 laps to go. In the closing 20 laps, the top ten cars broke away from the rest of the field. With two laps to go, Denny Hamlin broke out of line to go for the win. Carl Edwards got bumped in turn 1. The race stayed green after that and a wreck on the backstretch that collected Jeff Gordon, Casey Mears, Ricky Stenhouse Jr. and J. J. Yeley. Dale Earnhardt Jr. took home the checked flag. "I didn't know what he had up his sleeve,” Earnhardt Jr. said. “Maybe they got busy behind him and he couldn't form a charge. We had a real strong car. I didn't know if the engine was going to last. I had faith in it that it would because we build fast cars and they are tough. Just real emotional man. Everything is just so good for me now. My personal life. My racing. The team I am with. I don't know why. I don't feel like I deserve it. I just feel overcome with a lot of emotion. It has been a long time since I won here. I've run so good here, and not to win here in so many races has bothered me.”

=== Post-race ===
“It’s going to be a judgment call. We’ve stated that we’re going to make every effort to try to finish under green-flag conditions. That’s what the fans want to see. We’ve got to be obviously mindful of what’s occurring on the racetrack. It’s a split-second decision. I think yesterday if you look at the circumstances that played out with Carl, when we initially saw him get loose, he was down on the apron. As we made that quick decision, it was ‘OK, he’s clear we can go.’ Just as you make that, his car slides up across the track. That’s something you don’t want to see green- or yellow-flag conditions, but, at the time, if we would have thrown the yellow, then it’s too late because he’s already up and across the track. We elected to let it play out. We certainly didn’t like to see how Carl came across the track but ultimately we were able to come back under green-flag conditions. People want to point to who’s leading, who’s not leading, what could have happened, what didn’t happen. I know it’s hard to believe for some folks, we don’t look at that. We look at the circumstances of the incident. We’ve got to make that call. We’re not always going to be right. We know with each decision we open it up for debate. That’s sports. We’ll talk to Carl and the competitors about that but did like seeing us being able to finish under green.’’

— NASCAR executive vice-president Steve O'Donnell speaking on Sirius XM NASCAR Radio.

Following the race, Carl Edwards and Matt Kenseth expressed their displeasure over NASCAR not throwing a caution on the final lap. "There's people going by at 100-plus miles per hour," Edwards said of the accident scene. "They never checked up. I think that's the most dangerous thing in the sport right now at these places. When there's a wreck, guys got to get on the brake, or we're going to have a lot of problems. That's not the way I try to race these guys when there's a wreck. That's very frustrating. I guess some people would say, 'Well, hell, your job is to stay on the throttle and go race,' but we're all out there and are human beings. You get a guy wrecking — you can't just lay into his door. That's pretty dangerous." "There was that wreck at the end, and I had to lift so I didn't send Carl to the hospital," Kenseth said. "I'm just dumbfounded NASCAR didn't throw a caution. We were driving past wrecked cars for half a lap at 180 miles per hour."

In his weekly Monday appearance on the Sirius XM NASCAR Radio program The Morning Drive, Steve O'Donnell - NASCAR executive vice-president and chief racing development officer - explained to Mike Bagley and Pete Pistone on why NASCAR made the call to not throw the caution flag on the final lap.

=== Race results ===
| Pos | No. | Driver | Team | Manufacturer | Laps | Points |
|---|---|---|---|---|---|---|
| 1 | 88 | Dale Earnhardt Jr. | Hendrick Motorsports | Chevrolet | 188 | 48 |
| 2 | 48 | Jimmie Johnson | Hendrick Motorsports | Chevrolet | 188 | 43 |
| 3 | 27 | Paul Menard | Richard Childress Racing | Chevrolet | 188 | 41 |
| 4 | 21 | Ryan Blaney (i) | Wood Brothers Racing | Ford | 188 | 0 |
| 5 | 78 | Martin Truex Jr. | Furniture Row Racing | Chevrolet | 188 | 39 |
| 6 | 9 | Sam Hornish Jr. | Richard Petty Motorsports | Ford | 188 | 38 |
| 7 | 31 | Ryan Newman | Richard Childress Racing | Chevrolet | 188 | 37 |
| 8 | 4 | Kevin Harvick | Stewart–Haas Racing | Chevrolet | 188 | 37 |
| 9 | 11 | Denny Hamlin | Joe Gibbs Racing | Toyota | 188 | 36 |
| 10 | 98 | Josh Wise | Phil Parsons Racing | Ford | 188 | 35 |
| 11 | 1 | Jamie McMurray | Chip Ganassi Racing | Chevrolet | 188 | 33 |
| 12 | 41 | Kurt Busch | Stewart–Haas Racing | Chevrolet | 188 | 33 |
| 13 | 35 | Cole Whitt | Front Row Motorsports | Ford | 188 | 32 |
| 14 | 23 | J. J. Yeley (i) | BK Racing | Toyota | 188 | 0 |
| 15 | 43 | Aric Almirola | Richard Petty Motorsports | Ford | 188 | 29 |
| 16 | 7 | Alex Bowman | Tommy Baldwin Racing | Chevrolet | 188 | 28 |
| 17 | 47 | A. J. Allmendinger | JTG Daugherty Racing | Chevrolet | 188 | 27 |
| 18 | 83 | Matt DiBenedetto (R) | BK Racing | Toyota | 188 | 26 |
| 19 | 14 | Tony Stewart | Stewart–Haas Racing | Chevrolet | 188 | 26 |
| 20 | 38 | David Gilliland | Front Row Motorsports | Ford | 188 | 25 |
| 21 | 10 | Danica Patrick | Stewart–Haas Racing | Chevrolet | 188 | 23 |
| 22 | 2 | Brad Keselowski | Team Penske | Ford | 188 | 22 |
| 23 | 51 | Justin Allgaier | HScott Motorsports | Chevrolet | 188 | 22 |
| 24 | 34 | Chris Buescher (i) | Front Row Motorsports | Ford | 188 | 0 |
| 25 | 20 | Matt Kenseth | Joe Gibbs Racing | Toyota | 188 | 19 |
| 26 | 17 | Ricky Stenhouse Jr. | Roush Fenway Racing | Ford | 188 | 19 |
| 27 | 32 | Bobby Labonte | Go FAS Racing | Ford | 188 | 18 |
| 28 | 13 | Casey Mears | Germain Racing | Chevrolet | 188 | 17 |
| 29 | 46 | Michael Annett | HScott Motorsports | Chevrolet | 188 | 15 |
| 30 | 15 | Clint Bowyer | Michael Waltrip Racing | Toyota | 188 | 14 |
| 31 | 24 | Jeff Gordon | Hendrick Motorsports | Chevrolet | 188 | 14 |
| 32 | 19 | Carl Edwards | Joe Gibbs Racing | Toyota | 188 | 12 |
| 33 | 22 | Joey Logano | Team Penske | Ford | 186 | 11 |
| 34 | 5 | Kasey Kahne | Hendrick Motorsports | Chevrolet | 158 | 11 |
| 35 | 3 | Austin Dillon | Richard Childress Racing | Chevrolet | 157 | 9 |
| 36 | 55 | Michael Waltrip | Michael Waltrip Racing | Toyota | 151 | 8 |
| 37 | 16 | Greg Biffle | Roush Fenway Racing | Ford | 147 | 7 |
| 38 | 18 | David Ragan | Joe Gibbs Racing | Toyota | 123 | 6 |
| 39 | 40 | Landon Cassill (i) | Hillman-Circle Sport LLC | Chevrolet | 91 | 0 |
| 40 | 62 | Brendan Gaughan (i) | Premium Motorsports | Chevrolet | 90 | 0 |
| 41 | 6 | Trevor Bayne | Roush Fenway Racing | Ford | 46 | 3 |
| 42 | 42 | Kyle Larson | Chip Ganassi Racing | Chevrolet | 46 | 2 |
| 43 | 33 | Brian Scott (i) | Hillman-Circle Sport LLC | Chevrolet | 18 | 0 |
Official GEICO 500 results

=== Race statistics ===
- 27 lead changes among 15 different drivers
- 6 cautions for 23 laps; 1 red flag for 11 minutes 15 seconds
- Time of race: 3 hours, 08 minutes, 08 seconds
- Average speed: 159.487 mph (256.669 km/h)
- Dale Earnhardt Jr. took home $311,665 in winnings

Lap Leaders
| Laps | Leader |
|---|---|
| 1-3 | Jeff Gordon |
| 4-6 | Kasey Kahne |
| 7-11 | Tony Stewart |
| 12-15 | Dale Earnhardt Jr. |
| 16-19 | Jeff Gordon |
| 20 | Kevin Harvick |
| 21 | Justin Allgaier |
| 22 | Bobby Labonte |
| 23-48 | Jeff Gordon |
| 49 | Kurt Busch |
| 50-91 | Jimmie Johnson |
| 92 | David Gilliland |
| 93 | Josh Wise |
| 94-95 | Jeff Gordon |
| 96-103 | Jimmie Johnson |
| 104 | Dale Earnhardt Jr. |
| 105-106 | Denny Hamlin |
| 107-110 | Dale Earnhardt Jr. |
| 111-115 | Jeff Gordon |
| 116 | Casey Mears |
| 117-123 | Jeff Gordon |
| 124-147 | Dale Earnhardt Jr. |
| 148 | Tony Stewart |
| 149-155 | Dale Earnhardt Jr. |
| 156-158 | Denny Hamlin |
| 159 | Ricky Stenhouse Jr. |
| 160-161 | Cole Whitt |
| 162-188 | Dale Earnhardt Jr. |

Total laps led
| Leader | Laps |
|---|---|
| Dale Earnhardt Jr. | 67 |
| Jimmie Johnson | 50 |
| Jeff Gordon | 47 |
| Tony Stewart | 6 |
| Denny Hamlin | 5 |
| Kasey Kahne | 3 |
| Cole Whitt | 2 |
| Kevin Harvick | 1 |
| Josh Wise | 1 |
| Kurt Busch | 1 |
| David Gilliland | 1 |
| Justin Allgaier | 1 |
| Ricky Stenhouse Jr. | 1 |
| Bobby Labonte | 1 |
| Casey Mears | 1 |

==== Race awards ====
- Coors Light Pole Award: Jeff Gordon (49.160, 194.793 mph (313.489 km/h))
- 3M Lap Leader: Dale Earnhardt Jr. (67 laps)
- American Ethanol Green Flag Restart Award: Ricky Stenhouse Jr. (50.182, 190.824 mph (307.101 km/h))
- Duralast Brakes "Bake In The Race" Award: Jeff Gordon
- Freescale "Wide Open": Dale Earnhardt Jr.
- Ingersoll Rand Power Move: Kurt Busch (18 positions)
- MAHLE Clevite Engine Builder of the Race: Hendrick Engines, #88
- Mobil 1 Driver of the Race: Dale Earnhardt Jr. (134.7 driver rating)
- Moog Steering and Suspension Problem Solver of The Race: Paul Menard (crew chief Justin Alexander (-0.200))
- NASCAR Sprint Cup Leader Bonus: No winner: rolls over to $70,000 at next event
- Sherwin-Williams Fastest Lap: Carl Edwards (Lap 46, 46.758, 204.801 mph (329.595 km/h))
- Sunoco Rookie of The Race: Matt DiBenedetto

== Media ==
=== Television ===
Fox Sports covered their 15th race at Talladega Superspeedway. Mike Joy, Larry McReynolds and four-time Talladega winner Darrell Waltrip had the call in the booth for the race. Jamie Little, Chris Neville, Vince Welch and Matt Yocum handled the pit road duties for the television side. Fox NASCAR rules analyst Andy Petree was also involved in coverage.

Fox
| Booth announcers | Pit reporters |
|---|---|
| Lap-by-lap: Mike Joy; Color-commentator: Larry McReynolds; Color commentator: Darrell Waltrip | Jamie Little; Chris Neville; Vince Welch; Matt Yocum |

=== Radio ===
MRN had the radio call for the race, which was simulcasted on Sirius XM NASCAR Radio. Joe Moore, Jeff Striegle and Rusty Wallace called the race in the booth when the field was racing through the tri-oval. Dave Moody called the race from the Sunoco tower outside of turn 2 when the field was racing through turns 1 and 2. Mike Bagley called the race from a platform on the inside of the track over towards turn 3 when the field was racing down the Alabama Gang Superstretch (backstretch). Kyle Rickey called the race from the fan deck area outside of turn 4 when the field was racing through turns 3 and 4. Alex Hayden, Winston Kelley and Steve Post worked pit road for MRN.

MRN
| Booth announcers | Turn announcers | Pit reporters |
|---|---|---|
| Lead announcer: Joe Moore; Announcer: Jeff Striegle; Announcer: Rusty Wallace | Turns 1 & 2: Dave Moody; Backstretch: Mike Bagley; Turns 3 & 4: Kyle Rickey | Alex Hayden; Winston Kelley; Steve Post |

== Standings after the race ==
Drivers' Championship standings

| | Pos | Driver | Points |
|---|---|---|---|
| | 1 | Kevin Harvick | 394 |
| 1 | 2 | Martin Truex Jr. | 354 (-40) |
| 1 | 3 | Jimmie Johnson | 342 (-52) |
| 2 | 4 | Joey Logano | 335 (-59) |
| 3 | 5 | Dale Earnhardt Jr. | 319 (-75) |
| 1 | 6 | Brad Keselowski | 305 (-89) |
| 2 | 7 | Jamie McMurray | 297 (-94) |
| 1 | 8 | Matt Kenseth | 292 (-102) |
| 3 | 9 | Kasey Kahne | 286 (-108) |
| 2 | 10 | Denny Hamlin | 281 (-113) |
| 2 | 11 | Paul Menard | 280 (-114) |
| 1 | 12 | Aric Almirola | 279 (-115) |
| 3 | 13 | Jeff Gordon | 277 (-117) |
| 1 | 14 | Ryan Newman | 271 (-123) |
| 3 | 15 | Kurt Busch | 255 (-139) |
| | 16 | Danica Patrick | 253 (-141) |

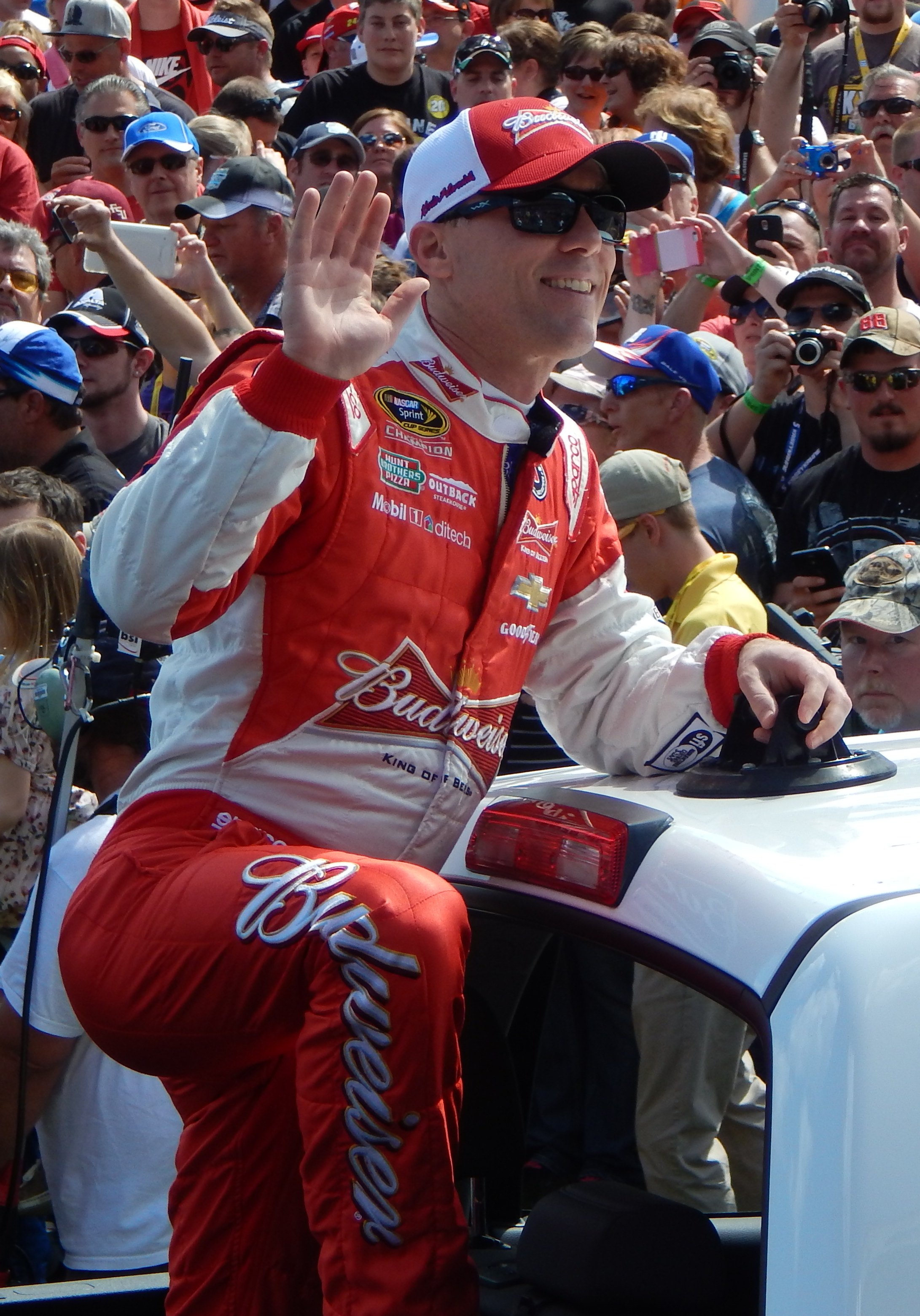
Kevin Harvick left Talladega with a 40-point lead over Martin Truex Jr.

Manufacturers' Championship standings

| Pos | Manufacturer | Points |
|---|---|---|
| 1 | Chevrolet | 453 |
| 2 | Ford | 416 (-37) |
| 3 | Toyota | 384 (-69) |

- Note: Only the first sixteen positions are included for the driver standings.

| Previous race: 2015 Toyota Owners 400 | Sprint Cup Series; 2015 season | Next race: 2015 SpongeBob SquarePants 400 |
