= 2014 Oral-B USA 500 =

Race details
- Race 25 of 36 in the 2014 NASCAR Sprint Cup Series
- Date: August 31, 2014
- Location: Atlanta Motor Speedway; Hampton, Georgia
- Course: Permanent racing facility
- Course length: 1.54 miles (2.478 km)
- Distance: 335 laps, 515.9 mi (830.261 km)
- Scheduled distance: 325 laps, 500.5 mi (805.477 km)
- Weather: Partly cloudy with a temperature of 84 °F (29 °C); wind out of the west at 3 miles per hour (4.8 km/h)
- Average speed: 131.512 mph (211.648 km/h)

Pole position
Driver	Kevin Harvick	Stewart–Haas Racing
- Time: 29.118

Most laps led
Driver	Kevin Harvick	Stewart–Haas Racing
- Laps: 195

Winner
No. 5	Kasey Kahne	Hendrick Motorsports

Television in the United States
- Network: ESPN & PRN
- Announcers: Allen Bestwick, Dale Jarrett and Andy Petree (Television); Doug Rice and Mark Garrow (Booth); Rob Albright (1 & 2) and Doug Turnball (3 & 4) (Turns) (Radio)
- Nielsen ratings: 3.2/7 (Final); 3.0/7 (Overnight); 5.21 Million viewers

The 2014 Oral-B USA 500 was a NASCAR Sprint Cup Series stock car race that was held on August 31, 2014, at Atlanta Motor Speedway in Hampton, Georgia. Contested over 335 laps on the 1.54 mi (2.48 km) quad-oval, it was the 25th race of the 2014 NASCAR Sprint Cup Series. Kasey Kahne of Hendrick Motorsports won the race, his first win of the season. Matt Kenseth finished second, while Denny Hamlin, Jimmie Johnson and Carl Edwards rounded out the top five. The top rookies of the race were Kyle Larson (8th), Michael Annett (21st), and Austin Dillon (24th). This was Danica Patrick’s best career finish.

== Report ==
=== Background ===
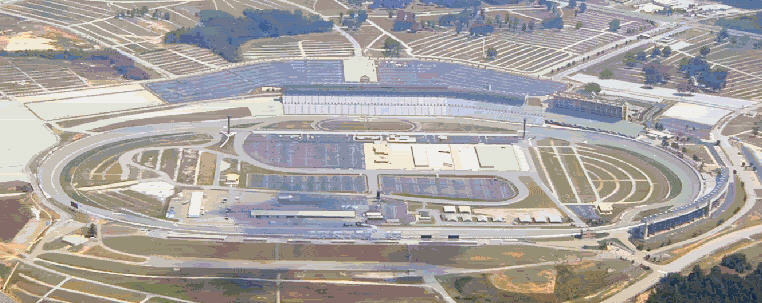
Atlanta Motor Speedway

The venue, Atlanta Motor Speedway, is a four-turn quad-oval track that is 1.54 miles (2.48 km) long. The track's turns are banked at twenty-four degrees, while the 2,332-foot (711 m) front stretch, the location of the finish line, and the 1,800-foot (550 m) back stretch are banked at five. The track's racing surface width varies from 55 feet to 60 feet. The defending race winner from 2013 was Kyle Busch.

Tony Stewart's status had been undecided going into the race. "It's just an emotional roller coaster all week, you know what I mean?" Greg Zipadelli, vice president of competition at Stewart–Haas Racing, stated after the previous weekend's race at Bristol Motor Speedway. "It is what it is. We do the best we can with what we've got right now. We'll keep praying, keep our fingers crossed that we get the boss back sooner rather than later." On Thursday, it was announced by NASCAR executive vice president and chief racing development officer Steve O'Donnell, that Stewart would return to racing at Atlanta. O'Donnell added that NASCAR had "remained in constant contact with his race team and we will stay very close to this situation as Stewart returns to competition".

On Friday, Stewart spoke publicly for the first time since the events of August 9 at Canandaigua Motorsports Park in upstate New York. Stewart described the situation as "one of the toughest tragedies I've ever had to deal with, both professionally and personally. It will affect my life forever". He said he reached out to the Ward family and said "I want them to know I'm thinking about them and praying for them." Stewart–Haas Racing executive vice president Brett Frood said "for Tony, it's all about the healing process. That's why he's in the car," when asked why Stewart decided to return while the investigation into Ward's death remained open. "I am not going to comment on the incident itself. It was a tragic accident." Stewart declined to answer any questions about the incident due to the ongoing investigation.

Later, NASCAR President Mike Helton spoke about Stewart and a waiver that he would receive, if he won at Atlanta or the following weekend at Richmond. With the waiver, Stewart would be eligible to make the Chase for the Sprint Cup. While Stewart had not attempted to qualify the last two races and, therefore, would have been ineligible, NASCAR had the ability to grant an exemption to a driver for "unique circumstances". "We made our decisions based on the circumstances we've got currently," Helton said. "And I think most everyone in this room understands at NASCAR, our effort, our scope of responsibility and authority is limited to the NASCAR community. We take the current circumstances that we are dealt with and make what we hope to be the best absolute conclusion. That's what we're talking about today, is the current set of circumstances and our reaction to them."

Reaction to the waiver was mostly positive from fellow drivers. "I'm happy to know if I was out of the car for some reason that I'd get a chance to get back in the Chase," Brian Vickers said. "There's a lot of circumstances that I don't know exactly how they'd handle them. Obviously they've set a precedent here with Tony. One day I'd like to have kids. Does that mean I get to be at the hospital with my wife if she's having our first child even if it means missing a race but I can still make the Chase?" "I think the whole intent of eligibility for the Chase is so that somebody doesn't go take a vacation after winning a few races," Jeff Gordon said. "(NASCAR) wants the teams and the drivers that have earned their way in it. I believe if they win a race they should be in it."

=== Entry list ===
The entry list for the Oral-B USA 500 was released on Monday, August 25, 2014 at 2:08 p.m. Eastern time. Forty-four drivers were entered for the race.

No.	Driver	Team	Manufacturer
1	Jamie McMurray	Chip Ganassi Racing	Chevrolet
2	Brad Keselowski (PC2)	Team Penske	Ford
3	Austin Dillon (R)	Richard Childress Racing	Chevrolet
4	Kevin Harvick	Stewart–Haas Racing	Chevrolet
5	Kasey Kahne	Hendrick Motorsports	Chevrolet
7	Michael Annett (R)	Tommy Baldwin Racing	Chevrolet
9	Marcos Ambrose	Richard Petty Motorsports	Ford
10	Danica Patrick	Stewart–Haas Racing	Chevrolet
11	Denny Hamlin	Joe Gibbs Racing	Toyota
13	Casey Mears	Germain Racing	Chevrolet
14	Tony Stewart (PC3)	Stewart–Haas Racing	Chevrolet
15	Clint Bowyer	Michael Waltrip Racing	Toyota
16	Greg Biffle	Roush Fenway Racing	Ford
17	Ricky Stenhouse Jr.	Roush Fenway Racing	Ford
18	Kyle Busch	Joe Gibbs Racing	Toyota
20	Matt Kenseth (PC5)	Joe Gibbs Racing	Toyota
22	Joey Logano	Team Penske	Ford
23	Alex Bowman (R)	BK Racing	Toyota
24	Jeff Gordon (PC6)	Hendrick Motorsports	Chevrolet
26	Cole Whitt (R)	BK Racing	Toyota
27	Paul Menard	Richard Childress Racing	Chevrolet
31	Ryan Newman	Richard Childress Racing	Chevrolet
32	J. J. Yeley (i)	Go FAS Racing	Ford
33	Ty Dillon (i)	Richard Childress Racing	Chevrolet
34	David Ragan	Front Row Motorsports	Ford
36	Reed Sorenson	Tommy Baldwin Racing	Chevrolet
37	Mike Bliss (i)	Tommy Baldwin Racing	Chevrolet
38	David Gilliland	Front Row Motorsports	Ford
40	Landon Cassill (i)	Hillman–Circle Sport	Chevrolet
41	Kurt Busch (PC4)	Stewart–Haas Racing	Chevrolet
42	Kyle Larson (R)	Chip Ganassi Racing	Chevrolet
43	Aric Almirola	Richard Petty Motorsports	Ford
47	A. J. Allmendinger	JTG Daugherty Racing	Chevrolet
48	Jimmie Johnson (PC1)	Hendrick Motorsports	Chevrolet
51	Justin Allgaier (R)	HScott Motorsports	Chevrolet
55	Brian Vickers	Michael Waltrip Racing	Toyota
66	Brett Moffitt	Identity Ventures Racing	Toyota
77	Joe Nemechek (i)	Randy Humphrey Racing	Ford
78	Martin Truex Jr.	Furniture Row Racing	Chevrolet
83	Ryan Truex (R)	BK Racing	Toyota
88	Dale Earnhardt Jr.	Hendrick Motorsports	Chevrolet
95	Michael McDowell	Leavine Family Racing	Ford
98	Josh Wise	Phil Parsons Racing	Chevrolet
99	Carl Edwards	Roush Fenway Racing	Ford
Official entry list

Key	Meaning
(R)	Rookie
(i)	Ineligible for points
(PC#)	Past champions provisional

== Practice ==
=== First practice ===
Carl Edwards was the fastest in the first practice session with a time of 28.747 and a speed of 192.855 mph (310.370 km/h). Tony Stewart, who sat out the last three races, was tenth with a time of 29.234 and a speed of 189.642 mph (305.199 km/h).

Pos	No.	Driver	Team	Manufacturer	Time	Speed
1	99	Carl Edwards	Roush Fenway Racing	Ford	28.747	192.855
2	31	Ryan Newman	Richard Childress Racing	Chevrolet	28.931	191.628
3	9	Marcos Ambrose	Richard Petty Motorsports	Ford	28.963	191.417
Official first practice results

== Qualifying ==
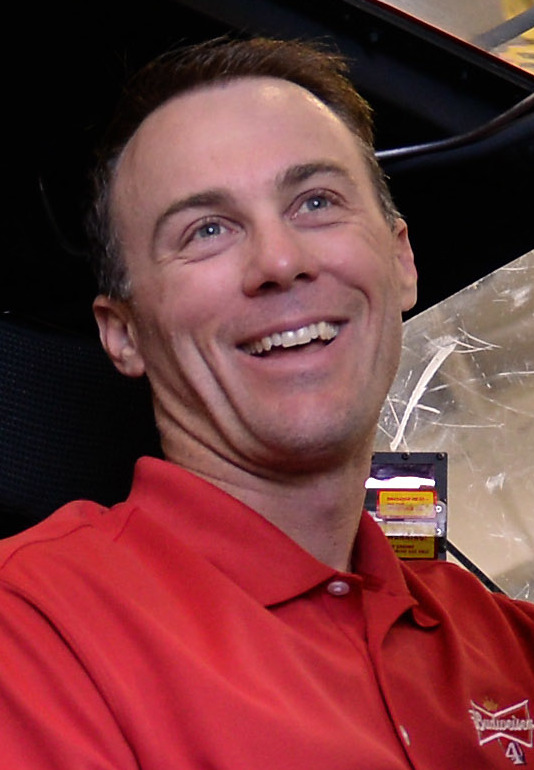
Kevin Harvick scored the pole position.

Kevin Harvick won the pole with a time of 29.118 and a speed of 190.398 mph (306.416 km/h). Harvick felt that his car did not change much during qualifying, but felt that he "messed the first round up really bad trying to do something that I wasn't doing in practice". Brad Keselowski joined Harvick on the front row, stating that his qualifying run – 0.052 seconds off Harvick's pole time – was his best since he started competing at Atlanta, praising his team's work in the process. In his first Sprint Cup qualifying session, Nationwide Series regular Ty Dillon qualified in 29th position. Dillon described the situation as "touch to come in...and expect a great qualifying effort", before stating that "it was a lot of fun going out there and qualifying with the big guys". 44 drivers contested qualifying, with Michael McDowell failing to qualify.

=== Qualifying results ===
Pos	No.	Driver	Team	Manufacturer	R1	R2	R3
1	4	Kevin Harvick	Stewart–Haas Racing	Chevrolet	29.442	29.115	29.118
2	2	Brad Keselowski	Team Penske	Ford	29.181	29.150	29.170
3	42	Kyle Larson (R)	Chip Ganassi Racing	Chevrolet	29.189	29.201	29.197
4	31	Ryan Newman	Richard Childress Racing	Chevrolet	29.487	29.247	29.272
5	20	Matt Kenseth	Joe Gibbs Racing	Toyota	29.026	29.044	29.334
6	78	Martin Truex Jr.	Furniture Row Racing	Chevrolet	29.442	29.280	29.346
7	43	Aric Almirola	Richard Petty Motorsports	Ford	28.984	29.266	29.391
8	18	Kyle Busch	Joe Gibbs Racing	Toyota	29.173	29.277	29.409
9	24	Jeff Gordon	Hendrick Motorsports	Chevrolet	29.432	29.221	29.419
10	5	Kasey Kahne	Hendrick Motorsports	Chevrolet	29.377	29.256	29.440
11	99	Carl Edwards	Roush Fenway Racing	Ford	29.204	29.222	29.480
12	14	Tony Stewart	Stewart–Haas Racing	Chevrolet	29.447	29.246	29.504
13	3	Austin Dillon (R)	Richard Childress Racing	Chevrolet	29.468	29.308	—
14	22	Joey Logano	Team Penske	Ford	29.450	29.318	—
15	1	Jamie McMurray	Chip Ganassi Racing	Chevrolet	29.436	29.358	—
16	48	Jimmie Johnson	Hendrick Motorsports	Chevrolet	29.304	29.363	—
17	11	Denny Hamlin	Joe Gibbs Racing	Toyota	29.428	29.389	—
18	16	Greg Biffle	Racing	Ford	29.394	29.410	—
19	55	Brian Vickers	Michael Waltrip Racing	Toyota	29.309	29.422	—
20	88	Dale Earnhardt Jr.	Hendrick Motorsports	Chevrolet	29.380	29.509	—
21	15	Clint Bowyer	Michael Waltrip Racing	Toyota	29.290	29.536	—
22	41	Kurt Busch	Stewart–Haas Racing	Chevrolet	29.487	29.590	—
23	47	A. J. Allmendinger	JTG Daugherty Racing	Chevrolet	29.452	29.604	—
24	13	Casey Mears	Germain Racing	Chevrolet	29.469	29.655	—
25	7	Michael Annett (R)	Tommy Baldwin Racing	Chevrolet	29.489	—	—
26	17	Ricky Stenhouse Jr.	Roush Fenway Racing	Ford	29.505	—	—
27	10	Danica Patrick	Stewart–Haas Racing	Chevrolet	29.529	—	—
28	37	Mike Bliss	Tommy Baldwin Racing	Chevrolet	29.571	—	—
29	33	Ty Dillon	Richard Childress Racing	Chevrolet	29.595	—	—
30	23	Alex Bowman (R)	BK Racing	Toyota	29.597	—	—
31	51	Justin Allgaier (R)	HScott Motorsports	Chevrolet	29.665	—	—
32	9	Marcos Ambrose	Richard Petty Motorsports	Ford	29.704	—	—
33	27	Paul Menard	Richard Childress Racing	Chevrolet	29.808	—	—
34	77	Joe Nemechek	Randy Humphrey Racing	Ford	29.816	—	—
35	66	Brett Moffitt	Identity Ventures Racing	Toyota	29.833	—	—
36	98	Josh Wise	Phil Parsons Racing	Chevrolet	29.844	—	—
37	38	David Gilliland	Front Row Motorsports	Ford	29.893	—	—
38	34	David Ragan	Front Row Motorsports	Ford	29.998	—	—
39	83	Ryan Truex (R)	BK Racing	Toyota	30.022	—	—
40	26	Cole Whitt (R)	BK Racing	Toyota	30.032	—	—
41	32	J. J. Yeley	Go FAS Racing	Ford	30.209	—	—
42	40	Landon Cassill	Hillman–Circle Sport	Chevrolet	30.284	—	—
43	36	Reed Sorenson	Tommy Baldwin Racing	Chevrolet	30.321	—	—
Did not qualify
44	95	Michael McDowell	Leavine Family Racing	Ford	30.025	—	—
Official qualifying results

== Practice (post-qualifying) ==
=== Second practice ===
Joey Logano was the fastest in the second practice session with a time of 29.279 and a speed of 189.351 mph (304.731 km/h).

Pos	No.	Driver	Team	Manufacturer	Time	Speed
1	22	Joey Logano	Team Penske	Ford	29.279	189.351
2	4	Kevin Harvick	Stewart–Haas Racing	Chevrolet	29.438	188.328
3	88	Dale Earnhardt Jr.	Hendrick Motorsports	Chevrolet	29.514	187.843
Official second practice results

=== Final practice ===
Matt Kenseth was the fastest in the final practice session with a time of 29.450 and a speed of 188.251 mph (302.961 km/h).

Pos	No.	Driver	Team	Manufacturer	Time	Speed
1	20	Matt Kenseth	Joe Gibbs Racing	Toyota	29.450	188.251
2	22	Joey Logano	Team Penske	Ford	29.510	187.869
3	11	Denny Hamlin	Joe Gibbs Racing	Toyota	29.629	187.114
Official final practice results

== Race ==
=== First half ===
==== Start ====
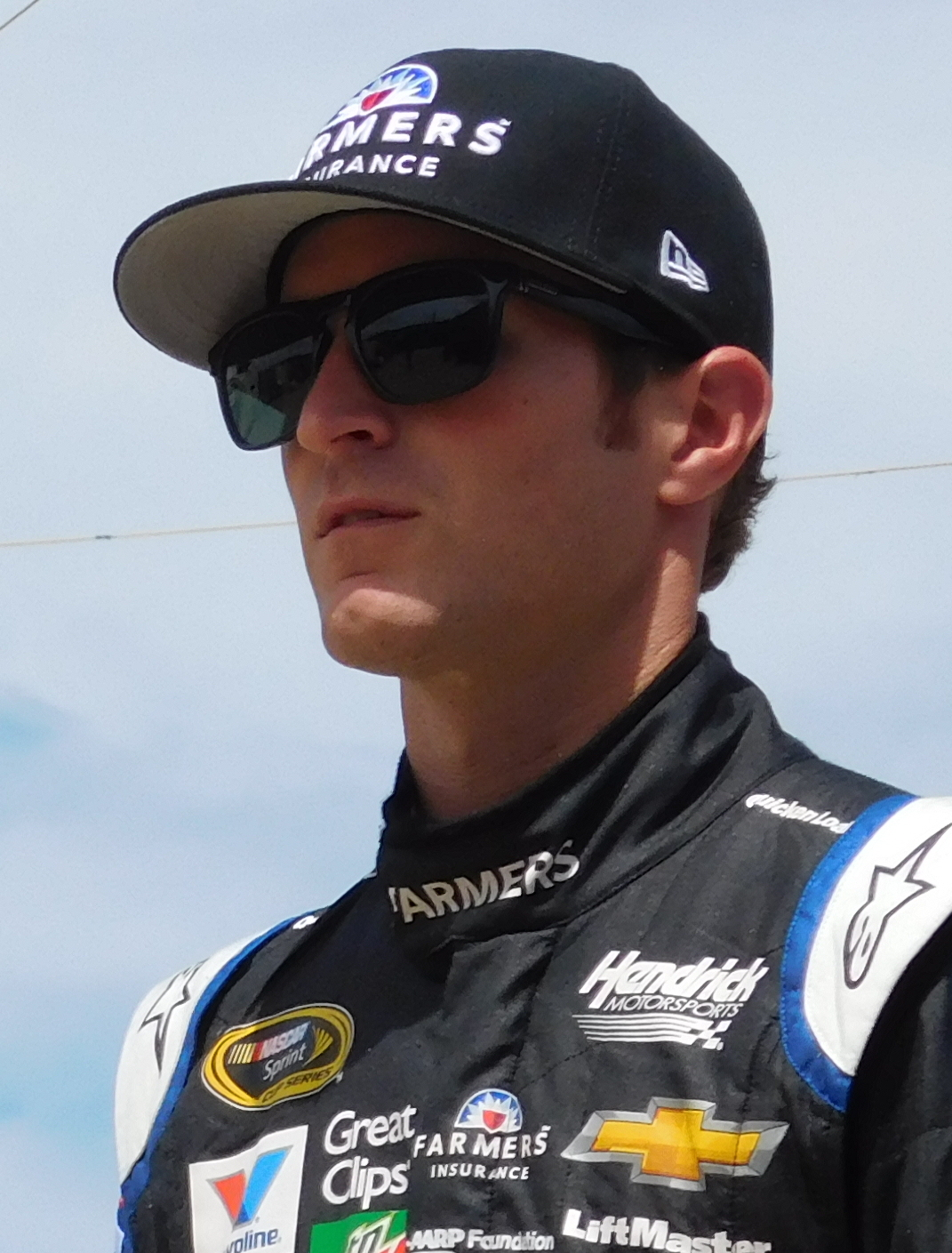
Kasey Kahne won the race.

The race was scheduled to begin at 7:46 PM Eastern time but started around five minutes later when Kevin Harvick led the field to the green flag. Brad Keselowski, who started second, spun the tires on the initial start and fell back to fifth. Harvick reported seeing a cat run across the race track in turn 3 on lap 14; it turned out to actually be a squirrel, while Jimmie Johnson had black strip-like objects stuck to the hood pins of his grill. The caution flew for the first time on lap 38 for debris; NASCAR called Carl Edwards down to pit road to replace a faulty transponder, but he was allowed to retake his spot in 5th place. The race restarted on lap 45, and ran under green flag conditions until the caution flew for the second time on lap 78, after Jeff Gordon's car blew a tire and forced him into the wall in turn 3. Denny Hamlin took the lead from Harvick during the pit stops.

The race restarted on lap 85, with Harvick and Hamlin dueling for the lead, before Hamlin was able to take it eventually on lap 86, holding Harvick all the way until lap 108. The caution flew for the third time on lap 117 after Ryan Truex spun through the grass on the front stretch. Hamlin retook the lead during the pit stop cycle, and led the field to the restart on lap 122. Tony Stewart made contact with the wall exiting turn 2 on the restart, while at the front, Matt Kenseth took the lead on lap 123. This pass for the lead occurred just before the caution flag flew again after Marcos Ambrose blew an engine. The race restarted on lap 135, and Kurt Busch took the lead from Kenseth on lap 136. Kenseth retook the lead on lap 158, before Harvick made his way back to the front, on lap 165.

=== Second half ===
Brad Keselowski took the lead as Harvick made his stop. Tony Stewart brought out the fifth caution on lap 172 after he hit the wall in turn 2. Stewart's crew chief Chad Johnston stated that Stewart "got off to a good start", but also stated that it was good to have his driver back in the car. Matt Kenseth made his stop before the caution and reassumed the lead for the restart on lap 180. Harvick retook the lead on lap 183, and held the lead for the remainder of the stint, before the race's sixth caution on lap 209, due to some debris falling off the car of Kasey Kahne. Kenseth retook the lead during the pit stops, and held the lead at the restart on lap 215. Harvick retook the lead with 98 laps to go, before giving up the lead to pit with 67 laps to go.

==== Calamity ====
Debris on the backstretch helped Harvick's cause however; it brought out the seventh caution of the race. Hamlin assumed the lead under caution, before Harvick cycled back through to the lead once Hamlin had made his next pit stop of the race. The race restarted with 62 laps to go. Keselowski brought out the eighth caution with 28 laps to go after rear-ending Josh Wise. Hamlin won the race off pit road and assumed the lead for the restart, with 23 laps to go. Kahne took the lead almost immediately, and managed to fend off his rivals until the final two laps, when the caution flags flew for the ninth time, after Kyle Busch sent Martin Truex Jr. into the wall. Kenseth won the race off pit road. On the first green-white-checker attempt, the field were unable to make it through turn one before cars started crashing.

==== Finish ====
Kahne took the lead on the second green-white-checker attempt and held off Kenseth to score his first win of the season. Kahne felt that his car was "all over the place during the race but the guys stayed with me and worked hard", but felt proud that they had sealed his place in the Chase for the Sprint Cup. Kenseth described the last two laps as "really intense", but also felt that "things are looking up" for the Joe Gibbs Racing driver.

=== Race results ===
Pos	No.	Driver	Team	Manufacturer	Laps	Points
1	5	Kasey Kahne	Hendrick Motorsports	Chevrolet	335	47
2	20	Matt Kenseth	Joe Gibbs Racing	Toyota	335	43
3	11	Denny Hamlin	Joe Gibbs Racing	Toyota	335	42
4	48	Jimmie Johnson	Hendrick Motorsports	Chevrolet	335	40
5	99	Carl Edwards	Roush Fenway Racing	Ford	335	39
6	10	Danica Patrick	Stewart–Haas Racing	Chevrolet	335	38
7	31	Ryan Newman	Richard Childress Racing	Chevrolet	335	37
8	42	Kyle Larson (R)	Chip Ganassi Racing	Chevrolet	335	36
9	43	Aric Almirola	Richard Petty Motorsports	Ford	335	35
10	16	Greg Biffle	Roush Fenway Racing	Ford	335	34
11	88	Dale Earnhardt Jr.	Hendrick Motorsports	Chevrolet	335	33
12	1	Jamie McMurray	Chip Ganassi Racing	Chevrolet	335	32
13	41	Kurt Busch	Stewart–Haas Racing	Chevrolet	335	32
14	22	Joey Logano	Team Penske	Ford	335	30
15	55	Brian Vickers	Michael Waltrip Racing	Toyota	335	29
16	18	Kyle Busch	Joe Gibbs Racing	Toyota	335	28
17	24	Jeff Gordon	Hendrick Motorsports	Chevrolet	335	27
18	27	Paul Menard	Richard Childress Racing	Chevrolet	335	26
19	4	Kevin Harvick	Stewart–Haas Racing	Chevrolet	335	27
20	17	Ricky Stenhouse Jr.	Roush Fenway Racing	Ford	334	24
21	7	Michael Annett (R)	Tommy Baldwin Racing	Chevrolet	334	23
22	13	Casey Mears	Germain Racing	Chevrolet	334	22
23	78	Martin Truex Jr.	Furniture Row Racing	Chevrolet	334	21
24	3	Austin Dillon (R)	Richard Childress Racing	Chevrolet	334	20
25	33	Ty Dillon	Richard Childress Racing-Circle Sport	Chevrolet	332	0
26	51	Justin Allgaier (R)	HScott Motorsports	Chevrolet	332	18
27	34	David Ragan	Front Row Motorsports	Ford	331	17
28	38	David Gilliland	Front Row Motorsports	Ford	330	16
29	36	Reed Sorenson	Tommy Baldwin Racing	Chevrolet	330	15
30	26	Cole Whitt (R)	BK Racing	Toyota	329	14
31	40	Landon Cassill	Hillman–Circle Sport	Chevrolet	329	0
32	32	J. J. Yeley	Go FAS Racing	Ford	328	0
33	98	Josh Wise	Phil Parsons Racing	Chevrolet	328	11
34	66	Brett Moffitt	Identity Ventures Racing	Toyota	327	10
35	23	Alex Bowman (R)	BK Racing	Toyota	326	9
36	83	Ryan Truex (R)	BK Racing	Toyota	326	8
37	77	Joe Nemechek	Randy Humphrey Racing	Ford	324	0
38	15	Clint Bowyer	Michael Waltrip Racing	Toyota	314	6
39	2	Brad Keselowski	Team Penske	Ford	296	6
40	47	A. J. Allmendinger	JTG Daugherty Racing	Chevrolet	258	4
41	14	Tony Stewart	Stewart–Haas Racing	Chevrolet	170	3
42	9	Marcos Ambrose	Richard Petty Motorsports	Ford	122	2
43	37	Mike Bliss	Tommy Baldwin Racing	Chevrolet	23	0

=== Race statistics ===
- 21 lead changes among different drivers
- 10 cautions for 56 laps
- Time of race: 3:55:24
- Kasey Kahne won his first race in 2014

== Media ==
=== Television ===
ESPN
Booth announcers	Pit reporters
Lap-by-lap: Allen Bestwick; Color-commentator: Dale Jarrett; Color commentator: Andy Petree	Dave Burns; Jim Noble; Vince Welch; Jamie Little

=== Radio ===
PRN Radio
Booth announcers	Turn announcers	Pit reporters
Lead announcer: Doug Rice; Announcer: Mark Garrow	Turns 1 & 2: Rob Albright; Turns 3 & 4: Doug Turnball	Brett McMillan; Steve Richards; Brad Gillie; Wendy Venturini

== Standings after the race ==
Drivers' Championship standings

	Pos	Driver	Points
	1	Jeff Gordon	872
	2	Dale Earnhardt Jr.	851 (−21)
2	3	Matt Kenseth	794 (−78)
	4	Joey Logano	791 (−81)
2	5	Brad Keselowski	782 (−90)
	6	Jimmie Johnson	766 (−106)
1	7	Carl Edwards	755 (−117)
1	8	Kevin Harvick	748 (−124)
	9	Ryan Newman	747 (−125)
1	10	Greg Biffle	728 (−144)
2	11	Kasey Kahne	708 (−164)
2	12	Clint Bowyer	705 (−167)
1	13	Kyle Larson (R)	704 (−168)
1	14	Paul Menard	675 (−197)
1	15	Austin Dillon (R)	674 (−198)
	16	Jamie McMurray	666 (−206)

Manufacturers' Championship standings

Pos	Manufacturer	Points
1	Chevrolet	1,124
2	Ford	1,088 (−36)
3	Toyota	1,006 (−118)

- Note: Only the first sixteen positions are included for the driver standings.

Previous race: 2014 Irwin Tools Night Race	Sprint Cup Series; 2014 season	Next race: 2014 Federated Auto Parts 400
