= 2014 Federated Auto Parts 400 =

Race details
- Race 26 of 36 in the 2014 NASCAR Sprint Cup Series
- Date: September 6, 2014
- Location: Richmond International Raceway; Richmond, Virginia
- Course: Permanent racing facility
- Course length: 0.75 miles (1.2 km)
- Distance: 400 laps, 300 mi (482.803 km)
- Weather: Partly cloudy with a temperature of 88 °F (31 °C); wind out of the WSW at 6 miles per hour (9.7 km/h)
- Average speed: 104.702 mph (168.502 km/h)

Pole position
Driver	Brad Keselowski	Team Penske
- Time: 21.324

Most laps led
Driver	Brad Keselowski	Team Penske
- Laps: 383

Winner
No. 2	Brad Keselowski	Team Penske

Television in the United States
- Network: ABC & MRN
- Announcers: Allen Bestwick, Dale Jarrett and Andy Petree (Television); Joe Moore and Jeff Striegle (Booth); Dave Moody (Backstretch) (Radio)
- Nielsen ratings: 3.0/5 (Final); 2.8/5 (Overnight); 4.92 Million viewers

The 2014 Federated Auto Parts 400 was a NASCAR Sprint Cup Series stock car race that was held on September 6, 2014, at Richmond International Raceway in Richmond, Virginia. Contested over 400 laps, it was the 26th race of the 2014 NASCAR Sprint Cup Series, and the final race prior to the Chase for the Sprint Cup, to decide the series champion. Brad Keselowski finished first after he dominated the race, leading 383 of the race's 400 laps. Jeff Gordon finished second while Clint Bowyer, Jamie McMurray, and Kevin Harvick rounded out the top five. The top rookies of the race were Kyle Larson (11th), Austin Dillon (20th), and Justin Allgaier (28th).

== Report ==
=== Background ===
Richmond International Raceway (RIR) is a 0.75 miles (1.21 km), D-shaped, asphalt race track located just outside Richmond, Virginia in Henrico County. It hosts the NASCAR Sprint Cup Series and Nationwide Series, and formerly hosted a NASCAR Camping World Truck Series race, a Verizon IndyCar Series race, and two United States Auto Club sprint car races.

With the race weekend being the final event before the Chase for the Sprint Cup commenced, there were numerous scenarios in play in order for the remaining places to the 16-driver Chase to be sealed. Numerous drivers inside the top 30 in points had the opportunity to seal a spot in the Chase with a victory in Richmond, while Ryan Newman, Greg Biffle, Clint Bowyer and Kyle Larson. With them being inside the top 30 in points, Paul Menard, Austin Dillon, Jamie McMurray, Brian Vickers, Marcos Ambrose, Casey Mears, Martin Truex Jr., Tony Stewart, Ricky Stenhouse Jr., Danica Patrick, Justin Allgaier, Michael Annett, David Gilliland, David Ragan and Cole Whitt could only qualify for the Chase with a win.

Instead of using the normal 33, Circle Sport Racing team owner Joe Falk ran the number 90 to honor former team owner and Richmond native Junie Donlavey.

=== Entry list ===
The entry list for the Federated Auto Parts 400 was released on Tuesday, September 2, 2014 at 8:32 a.m. Eastern time. Forty-four drivers were entered for the race. David Stremme's car, after being entered as the No. 33, would be renumbered to No. 90 for to the weekend.

No.	Driver	Team	Manufacturer
1	Jamie McMurray	Chip Ganassi Racing	Chevrolet
2	Brad Keselowski (PC2)	Team Penske	Ford
3	Austin Dillon (R)	Richard Childress Racing	Chevrolet
4	Kevin Harvick	Stewart–Haas Racing	Chevrolet
5	Kasey Kahne	Hendrick Motorsports	Chevrolet
7	Michael Annett (R)	Tommy Baldwin Racing	Chevrolet
9	Marcos Ambrose	Richard Petty Motorsports	Ford
10	Danica Patrick	Stewart–Haas Racing	Chevrolet
11	Denny Hamlin	Joe Gibbs Racing	Toyota
13	Casey Mears	Germain Racing	Chevrolet
14	Tony Stewart (PC3)	Stewart–Haas Racing	Chevrolet
15	Clint Bowyer	Michael Waltrip Racing	Toyota
16	Greg Biffle	Roush Fenway Racing	Ford
17	Ricky Stenhouse Jr.	Roush Fenway Racing	Ford
18	Kyle Busch	Joe Gibbs Racing	Toyota
20	Matt Kenseth (PC5)	Joe Gibbs Racing	Toyota
22	Joey Logano	Team Penske	Ford
23	Alex Bowman (R)	BK Racing	Toyota
24	Jeff Gordon (PC6)	Hendrick Motorsports	Chevrolet
26	Cole Whitt (R)	BK Racing	Toyota
27	Paul Menard	Richard Childress Racing	Chevrolet
31	Ryan Newman	Richard Childress Racing	Chevrolet
32	Travis Kvapil	Go FAS Racing	Ford
34	David Ragan	Front Row Motorsports	Ford
36	Reed Sorenson	Tommy Baldwin Racing	Chevrolet
37	Mike Bliss (i)	Tommy Baldwin Racing	Chevrolet
38	David Gilliland	Front Row Motorsports	Ford
40	Landon Cassill (i)	Hillman–Circle Sport	Chevrolet
41	Kurt Busch (PC4)	Stewart–Haas Racing	Chevrolet
42	Kyle Larson (R)	Chip Ganassi Racing	Chevrolet
43	Aric Almirola	Richard Petty Motorsports	Ford
47	A. J. Allmendinger	JTG Daugherty Racing	Chevrolet
48	Jimmie Johnson (PC1)	Hendrick Motorsports	Chevrolet
51	Justin Allgaier (R)	HScott Motorsports	Chevrolet
55	Brian Vickers	Michael Waltrip Racing	Toyota
66	Joe Nemechek (i)	Identity Ventures Racing	Toyota
75	Clay Rogers (i)	Beard Motorsports	Chevrolet
78	Martin Truex Jr.	Furniture Row Racing	Chevrolet
83	Ryan Truex (R)	BK Racing	Toyota
88	Dale Earnhardt Jr.	Hendrick Motorsports	Chevrolet
90	David Stremme	Hillman–Circle Sport	Chevrolet
93	J. J. Yeley (i)	BK Racing	Toyota
98	Josh Wise	Phil Parsons Racing	Chevrolet
99	Carl Edwards	Roush Fenway Racing	Ford
Official entry list

Key	Meaning
(R)	Rookie
(i)	Ineligible for points
(PC#)	Past champions provisional

== Practice ==
=== First practice ===
Kevin Harvick was the fastest in the first practice session with a time of 20.912 and a speed of 129.112 mph (207.786 km/h). The session was three hours in length – unusual for NASCAR – because Goodyear brought an entirely new tire compound and NASCAR wanted the teams to have as much time as possible to test the new tires.

Pos	No.	Driver	Team	Manufacturer	Time	Speed
1	4	Kevin Harvick	Stewart–Haas Racing	Chevrolet	20.912	129.112
2	2	Brad Keselowski	Team Penske	Ford	20.962	128.805
3	22	Joey Logano	Team Penske	Ford	20.977	128.712
Official first practice results

=== Final practice ===
Carl Edwards was the fastest in the final practice session with a time of 22.156 and a speed of 121.863 mph (196.119 km/h). Brian Vickers switched to a backup car after blowing the left-rear tire of his car, which resulted in hitting the wall in turn two. Upon exiting his car, Vickers stated that he had "lost the left rear going down the front stretch" and that he "did the best I could to keep it off the wall".

Pos	No.	Driver	Team	Manufacturer	Time	Speed
1	99	Carl Edwards	Roush Fenway Racing	Ford	22.156	121.863
2	2	Brad Keselowski	Team Penske	Ford	22.160	121.841
3	15	Clint Bowyer	Michael Waltrip Racing	Toyota	22.179	121.737
Official final practice results

== Qualifying ==
Brad Keselowski won the pole with a time of 21.324 and a speed of 126.618 mph (203.772 km/h); it was the seventh pole of his Sprint Cup career. Keselowski expressed that it was "a great start to the weekend but still got a long ways to go" but also stated that he was "excited and I feel like we have a shot to win". Jeff Gordon joined Keselowski on the front row, praising his rival's lap time; he was almost a tenth of a second clear at the end of qualifying. Gordon praised his own team's ethic as well, stating "to be up here on the front row, that's certainly a great effort". Clay Rogers, who was attempting to make his first start, was the only driver that failed to qualify.

=== Qualifying results ===
Pos	No.	Driver	Team	Manufacturer	R1	R2
1	2	Brad Keselowski	Team Penske	Ford	21.574	21.324
2	24	Jeff Gordon	Hendrick Motorsports	Chevrolet	21.441	21.422
3	48	Jimmie Johnson	Hendrick Motorsports	Chevrolet	21.481	21.446
4	4	Kevin Harvick	Stewart–Haas Racing	Chevrolet	21.516	21.453
5	22	Joey Logano	Team Penske	Ford	21.482	21.486
6	15	Clint Bowyer	Michael Waltrip Racing	Toyota	21.548	21.491
7	17	Ricky Stenhouse Jr.	Roush Fenway Racing	Ford	21.534	21.518
8	42	Kyle Larson (R)	Chip Ganassi Racing	Chevrolet	21.590	21.586
9	41	Kurt Busch	Stewart–Haas Racing	Chevrolet	21.566	21.615
10	99	Carl Edwards	Roush Fenway Racing	Ford	21.604	21.658
11	11	Denny Hamlin	Joe Gibbs Racing	Toyota	21.535	21.676
12	31	Ryan Newman	Richard Childress Racing	Chevrolet	21.583	21.693
13	10	Danica Patrick	Stewart–Haas Racing	Chevrolet	21.629	—
14	27	Paul Menard	Richard Childress Racing	Chevrolet	21.653	—
15	1	Jamie McMurray	Chip Ganassi Racing	Chevrolet	21.653	—
16	20	Matt Kenseth	Joe Gibbs Racing	Toyota	21.666	—
17	16	Greg Biffle	Roush Fenway Racing	Ford	21.674	—
18	55	Brian Vickers	Michael Waltrip Racing	Toyota	21.688	—
19	14	Tony Stewart	Stewart–Haas Racing	Chevrolet	21.700	—
20	18	Kyle Busch	Joe Gibbs Racing	Toyota	21.706	—
21	5	Kasey Kahne	Hendrick Motorsports	Chevrolet	21.713	—
22	13	Casey Mears	Germain Racing	Chevrolet	21.720	—
23	47	A. J. Allmendinger	JTG Daugherty Racing	Chevrolet	21.726	—
24	88	Dale Earnhardt Jr.	Hendrick Motorsports	Chevrolet	21.727	—
25	23	Alex Bowman (R)	BK Racing	Toyota	21.730	—
26	43	Aric Almirola	Richard Petty Motorsports	Ford	21.735	—
27	51	Justin Allgaier (R)	HScott Motorsports	Chevrolet	21.737	—
28	3	Austin Dillon (R)	Richard Childress Racing	Chevrolet	21.773	—
29	78	Martin Truex Jr.	Furniture Row Racing	Chevrolet	21.794	—
30	38	David Gilliland	Front Row Motorsports	Ford	21.812	–
31	90	David Stremme	Hillman–Circle Sport	Chevrolet	21.824	—
32	36	Reed Sorenson	Tommy Baldwin Racing	Chevrolet	21.830	—
33	9	Marcos Ambrose	Richard Petty Motorsports	Ford	21.873	—
34	40	Landon Cassill	Hillman–Circle Sport	Chevrolet	21.882	—
35	26	Cole Whitt (R)	BK Racing	Toyota	21.889	—
36	98	Josh Wise	Phil Parsons Racing	Chevrolet	21.903	—
37	32	Travis Kvapil	Go FAS Racing	Ford	21.911	—
38	93	J. J. Yeley	BK Racing	Toyota	21.922	—
39	37	Mike Bliss	Tommy Baldwin Racing	Chevrolet	22.064	—
40	7	Michael Annett (R)	Tommy Baldwin Racing	Chevrolet	22.085	—
41	66	Joe Nemechek	Identity Ventures Racing	Toyota	22.174	—
42	34	David Ragan	Front Row Motorsports	Ford	0.000	—
43	83	Ryan Truex (R)	BK Racing	Toyota	0.000	—
Did not qualify
44	75	Clay Rogers	Beard Motorsports	Chevrolet	21.993	—
Official qualifying results

== Race ==
=== First half ===
==== Start ====
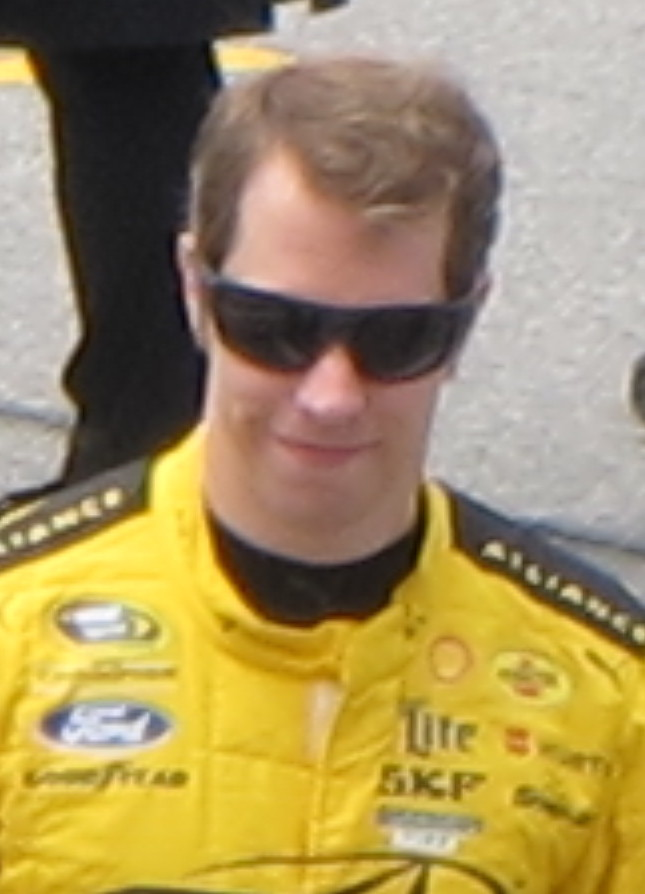
Brad Keselowski won the race from the pole position.

The race was scheduled to start at 7:43 p.m. Eastern time, but started five minutes later with Brad Keselowski leading the field to the green. Keselowski held the race lead for the majority of the first stint, before he was passed by Kevin Harvick, on lap 43. The caution flag flew for the first time, for a scheduled competition caution on lap 51, due to rain showers earlier in the day; Keselowski retook the lead on pit road, and held the lead for the restart, on lap 58. Again, Keselowski led for a large portion of the race, before Harvick retook the lead on lap 120. Further down the order, Matt Kenseth made light contact with the wall in turn 1, but the caution flag was not brought out until lap 124. However, this was for an unrelated incident, as debris on the backstretch brought out the second caution of the race. Keselowski returned to the lead after his pit crew bettered Harvick's crew for their respective service; it was a lead he would not relinquish for the rest of the night.

=== Second half ===
==== Drunk fan on the fence ====
The race restarted on lap 132, and Keselowski continued to maintain order at the head of the order, and in the process, led his 1-thousandth lap of the season on lap 158. Debris brought out the third caution of the race on lap 262, with the restart on lap 271. One further caution occurred later in the race, when a fan ascended the catch fencing at turn 4, on lap 330. The fan was later arrested and charged with disorderly conduct and being drunk in public. The race restarted with 64 laps to go, and Keselowski held the front until the end – having led 383 of the race's 400 laps – to take his fourth win of the season and the top seeding for the Chase for the Sprint Cup.

=== Post-race ===
Keselowski stated in his post-race interview that he had "pinched myself once to make sure I wasn't dreaming. These are nights you don't forget as a driver and you live for", while stating that his car was "just flying" and that he "couldn't ask for a better way to enter the Chase than to win and take the first seed". Clint Bowyer finished third, and failed to overturn the points disadvantage he had, to make the Chase. Bowyer expressed disappointedly that it was "definitely frustrating not making that Chase, but like I said, when you do make the Chase, you want it to be for a championship, not just ride around in it". After his eighth-place finish, Jimmie Johnson was taken to the infield care center due to dehydration. Hendrick Motorsports team mate Dale Earnhardt Jr. – who was 12th in the finishing order – put the cause down to the ambient conditions, while also stating that he "thought I might have some trouble with it because I had a sinus cold all week" and that he "must have something going on — something that didn't agree with him today that he ate or drank". Another Hendrick driver, Jeff Gordon, also felt the conditions in his car, stating that he knew "there were a couple times when I felt like I was cramping a little bit as well".

=== Race results ===
Pos	No.	Driver	Team	Manufacturer	Laps	Points
1	2	Brad Keselowski	Team Penske	Ford	400	48
2	24	Jeff Gordon	Hendrick Motorsports	Chevrolet	400	42
3	15	Clint Bowyer	Michael Waltrip Racing	Toyota	400	41
4	1	Jamie McMurray	Chip Ganassi Racing	Chevrolet	400	40
5	4	Kevin Harvick	Stewart–Haas Racing	Chevrolet	400	40
6	22	Joey Logano	Team Penske	Ford	400	38
7	41	Kurt Busch	Stewart–Haas Racing	Chevrolet	400	37
8	48	Jimmie Johnson	Hendrick Motorsports	Chevrolet	400	36
9	31	Ryan Newman	Richard Childress Racing	Chevrolet	400	35
10	43	Aric Almirola	Richard Petty Motorsports	Ford	400	34
11	42	Kyle Larson (R)	Chip Ganassi Racing	Chevrolet	400	33
12	88	Dale Earnhardt Jr.	Hendrick Motorsports	Chevrolet	400	32
13	55	Brian Vickers	Michael Waltrip Racing	Toyota	400	31
14	18	Kyle Busch	Joe Gibbs Racing	Toyota	400	30
15	14	Tony Stewart	Stewart–Haas Racing	Chevrolet	400	29
16	10	Danica Patrick	Stewart–Haas Racing	Chevrolet	400	28
17	5	Kasey Kahne	Hendrick Motorsports	Chevrolet	399	27
18	27	Paul Menard	Richard Childress Racing	Chevrolet	399	26
19	16	Greg Biffle	Roush Fenway Racing	Ford	398	25
20	3	Austin Dillon (R)	Richard Childress Racing	Chevrolet	398	24
21	11	Denny Hamlin	Joe Gibbs Racing	Toyota	398	23
22	99	Carl Edwards	Roush Fenway Racing	Ford	396	22
23	47	A. J. Allmendinger	JTG Daugherty Racing	Chevrolet	396	21
24	36	Reed Sorenson	Tommy Baldwin Racing	Chevrolet	396	20
25	78	Martin Truex Jr.	Furniture Row Racing	Chevrolet	396	19
26	17	Ricky Stenhouse Jr.	Roush Fenway Racing	Ford	396	18
27	9	Marcos Ambrose	Richard Petty Motorsports	Ford	395	17
28	51	Justin Allgaier (R)	HScott Motorsports	Chevrolet	395	16
29	38	David Gilliland	Front Row Motorsports	Ford	395	15
30	26	Cole Whitt (R)	BK Racing	Toyota	394	14
31	13	Casey Mears	Germain Racing	Chevrolet	394	13
32	98	Josh Wise	Phil Parsons Racing	Chevrolet	394	12
33	34	David Ragan	Front Row Motorsports	Ford	394	11
34	40	Landon Cassill	Hillman–Circle Sport	Chevrolet	394	0
35	37	Mike Bliss	Tommy Baldwin Racing	Chevrolet	394	0
36	90	David Stremme	Hillman–Circle Sport	Chevrolet	392	8
37	7	Michael Annett (R)	Tommy Baldwin Racing	Chevrolet	392	7
38	23	Alex Bowman (R)	BK Racing	Toyota	391	6
39	32	Travis Kvapil	Go FAS Racing	Ford	391	5
40	66	Joe Nemechek	Identity Ventures Racing	Toyota	388	0
41	20	Matt Kenseth	Joe Gibbs Racing	Toyota	330	3
42	83	Ryan Truex (R)	BK Racing	Toyota	313	2
43	93	J. J. Yeley	BK Racing	Toyota	31	0

=== Race statistics ===
- 4 lead changes among different drivers
- 4 cautions for 27 laps
- Time of race: 2:51:55
- Brad Keselowski won his fourth race in 2014

== Media ==
=== Television ===
ABC
Booth announcers	Pit reporters
Lap-by-lap: Allen Bestwick; Color-commentator: Dale Jarrett; Color commentator: Andy Petree	Jerry Punch; Dave Burns; Vince Welch; Jamie Little

=== Radio ===
MRN Radio
Booth announcers	Turn announcers	Pit reporters
Lead announcer: Joe Moore; Announcer: Jeff Striegle	Backstretch: Dave Moody	Winston Kelly; Steve Post; Dustin Long; Woody Cain

== Standings after the race ==
Drivers' Championship standings after reset

	Pos	Driver	Points
4	1	Brad Keselowski	2,012
1	2	Jeff Gordon	2,009 (−3)
1	3	Dale Earnhardt Jr.	2,009 (−3)
2	4	Jimmie Johnson	2,009 (−3)
1	5	Joey Logano	2,009 (−3)
2	6	Kevin Harvick	2,006 (−6)
	7	Carl Edwards	2,006 (−6)
9	8	Kyle Busch	2,003 (−9)
10	9	Denny Hamlin	2,003 (−9)
11	10	Kurt Busch	2,003 (−9)
	11	Kasey Kahne	2,003 (−9)
10	12	Aric Almirola	2,003 (−9)
10	13	A. J. Allmendinger	2,003 (−9)
11	14	Matt Kenseth	2,000 (−12)
5	15	Greg Biffle	2,000 (−12)
7	16	Ryan Newman	2,000 (−12)

Manufacturers' Championship standings

Pos	Manufacturer	Points
1	Chevrolet	1,166
2	Ford	1,136 (−30)
3	Toyota	1,047 (−119)

- Note: Only the first sixteen positions are included for the driver standings.

Previous race: 2014 Oral-B USA 500	Sprint Cup Series; 2014 season	Next race: 2014 MyAFibStory.com 400
