= 2012 Capital City 400 =

Race details
- Race 9 of 36 in the 2012 NASCAR Sprint Cup Series
- Date: April 28, 2012
- Location: Richmond International Raceway, Richmond, Virginia
- Course: Permanent racing facility
- Course length: 0.75 miles (1.20 km)
- Distance: 400 laps, 300 mi (483 km)
- Weather: Mostly cloudy; wind out of the E at 6 mph.
- Average speed: 105.202 miles per hour (169.306 km/h)

Pole position
Driver	Mark Martin	Michael Waltrip Racing
- Time: 21.040

Most laps led
Driver	Carl Edwards	Roush Fenway Racing
- Laps: 211

Winner
No. 18	Kyle Busch	Joe Gibbs Racing

Television in the United States
- Network: Fox
- Announcers: Mike Joy, Darrell Waltrip and Larry McReynolds

The 2012 Capital City 400 presented by Virginia Is For Lovers was a NASCAR Sprint Cup Series stock car race held on April 28, 2012 at Richmond International Raceway in Richmond, Virginia. Contested over 400 laps, it was the ninth race of the 2012 season. Kyle Busch of Joe Gibbs Racing took his first win of the season, while Dale Earnhardt Jr. finished second and Tony Stewart finished third.

== Race report ==
=== Background ===
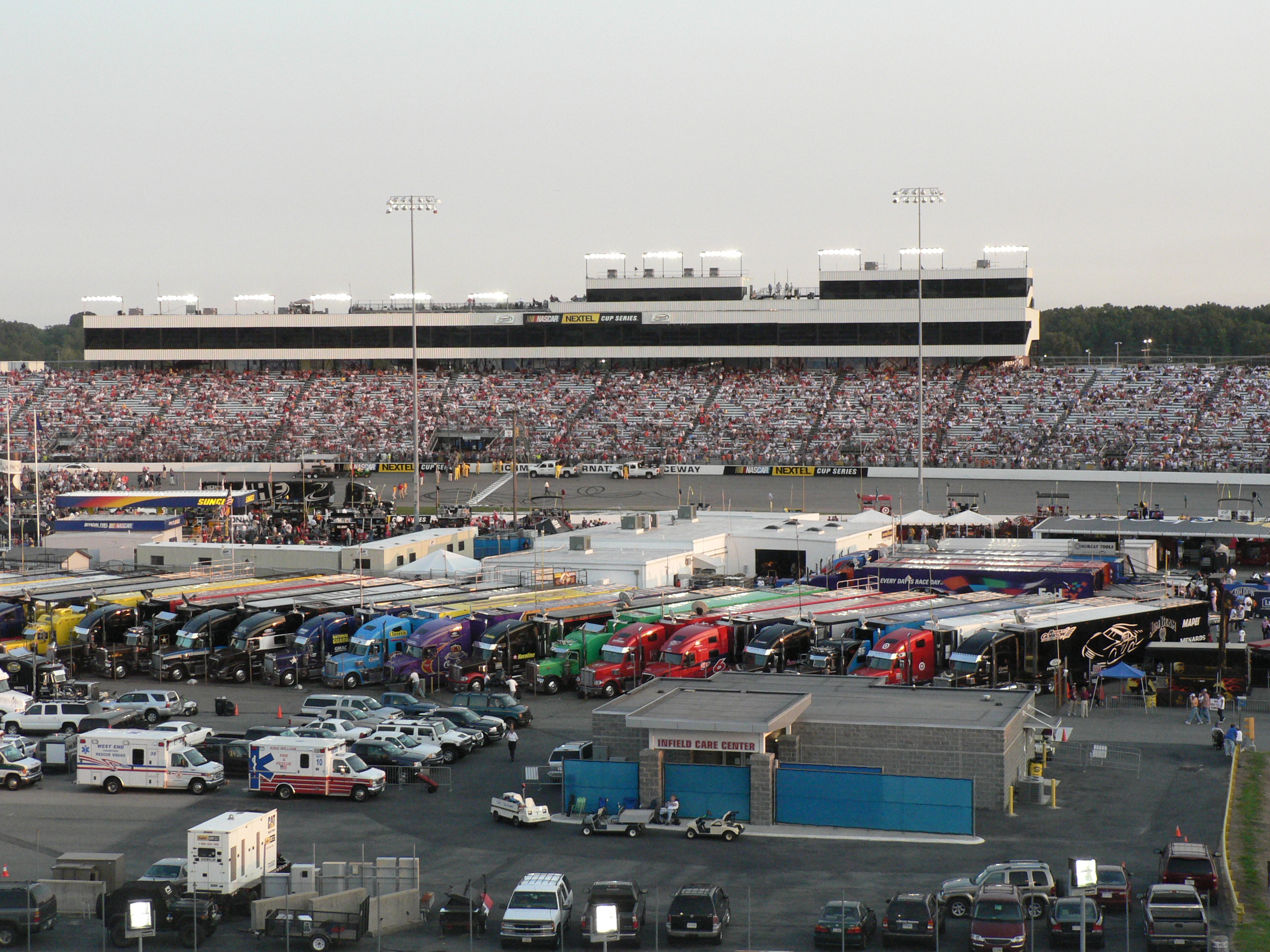
Richmond International Raceway, the race track where the race was held.

Richmond International Raceway is one of five short tracks to hold NASCAR races; the others are Bristol Motor Speedway, Dover International Speedway, Martinsville Speedway, and Phoenix International Raceway. The NASCAR race makes use of the track's standard configuration, a four-turn short track oval that is 0.75 miles (1.21 km) long. The track's turns are banked at fourteen degrees. The front stretch, the location of the finish line, is banked at eight degrees while the back stretch has two degrees of banking. The racetrack has seats for 97,912 spectators.

Before the race, Greg Biffle led the Drivers' Championship with 312 points, and Martin Truex Jr. stood in second with 297. Matt Kenseth was third in the Drivers' Championship with 295 points, four ahead of Dale Earnhardt Jr. and six ahead of Denny Hamlin in fourth and fifth. Kevin Harvick with 287 was twelve ahead of Jimmie Johnson, as Tony Stewart with 265 points, was fourteen ahead of Carl Edwards, and sixteen in front of Ryan Newman. In the Manufacturers' Championship, Chevrolet was leading with 54 points, eight ahead of Ford. Toyota, with 43 points, was ten points ahead of Dodge in the battle for third. Kyle Busch was the race's defending race winner after winning it in 2011.

=== Entry list ===
(R) - Denotes rookie driver.

(i) - Denotes driver who is ineligible for series driver points.

No.	Driver	Team	Manufacturer
1	Jamie McMurray	Earnhardt Ganassi Racing	Chevrolet
2	Brad Keselowski	Penske Racing	Dodge
5	Kasey Kahne	Hendrick Motorsports	Chevrolet
9	Marcos Ambrose	Richard Petty Motorsports	Ford
10	David Reutimann	Tommy Baldwin Racing	Chevrolet
11	Denny Hamlin	Joe Gibbs Racing	Toyota
13	Casey Mears	Germain Racing	Ford
14	Tony Stewart	Stewart–Haas Racing	Chevrolet
15	Clint Bowyer	Michael Waltrip Racing	Toyota
16	Greg Biffle	Roush Fenway Racing	Ford
17	Matt Kenseth	Roush Fenway Racing	Ford
18	Kyle Busch	Joe Gibbs Racing	Toyota
19	Mike Bliss (i)	Humphrey Smith Racing	Toyota
20	Joey Logano	Joe Gibbs Racing	Toyota
22	A. J. Allmendinger	Penske Racing	Dodge
24	Jeff Gordon	Hendrick Motorsports	Chevrolet
26	Josh Wise (R)	Front Row Motorsports	Ford
27	Paul Menard	Richard Childress Racing	Chevrolet
29	Kevin Harvick	Richard Childress Racing	Chevrolet
30	David Stremme	Inception Motorsports	Toyota
31	Jeff Burton	Richard Childress Racing	Chevrolet
32	Reed Sorenson (i)	FAS Lane Racing	Ford
33	Stephen Leicht (R)	Circle Sport	Chevrolet
34	David Ragan	Front Row Motorsports	Ford
36	Dave Blaney	Tommy Baldwin Racing	Chevrolet
38	David Gilliland	Front Row Motorsports	Ford
39	Ryan Newman	Stewart–Haas Racing	Chevrolet
42	Juan Pablo Montoya	Earnhardt Ganassi Racing	Chevrolet
43	Aric Almirola	Richard Petty Motorsports	Ford
47	Bobby Labonte	JTG Daugherty Racing	Toyota
48	Jimmie Johnson	Hendrick Motorsports	Chevrolet
49	J. J. Yeley	Robinson-Blakeney Racing	Toyota
51	Kurt Busch	Phoenix Racing	Chevrolet
55	Mark Martin	Michael Waltrip Racing	Toyota
56	Martin Truex Jr.	Michael Waltrip Racing	Toyota
74	Cole Whitt (i)	Turn One Racing	Chevrolet
78	Regan Smith	Furniture Row Racing	Chevrolet
83	Landon Cassill	BK Racing	Toyota
87	Joe Nemechek (i)	NEMCO Motorsports	Toyota
88	Dale Earnhardt Jr.	Hendrick Motorsports	Chevrolet
93	Travis Kvapil	BK Racing	Toyota
95	Scott Speed	Leavine Family Racing	Ford
98	Michael McDowell	Phil Parsons Racing	Ford
99	Carl Edwards	Roush Fenway Racing	Ford
Official entry list

== Practice and qualifying ==
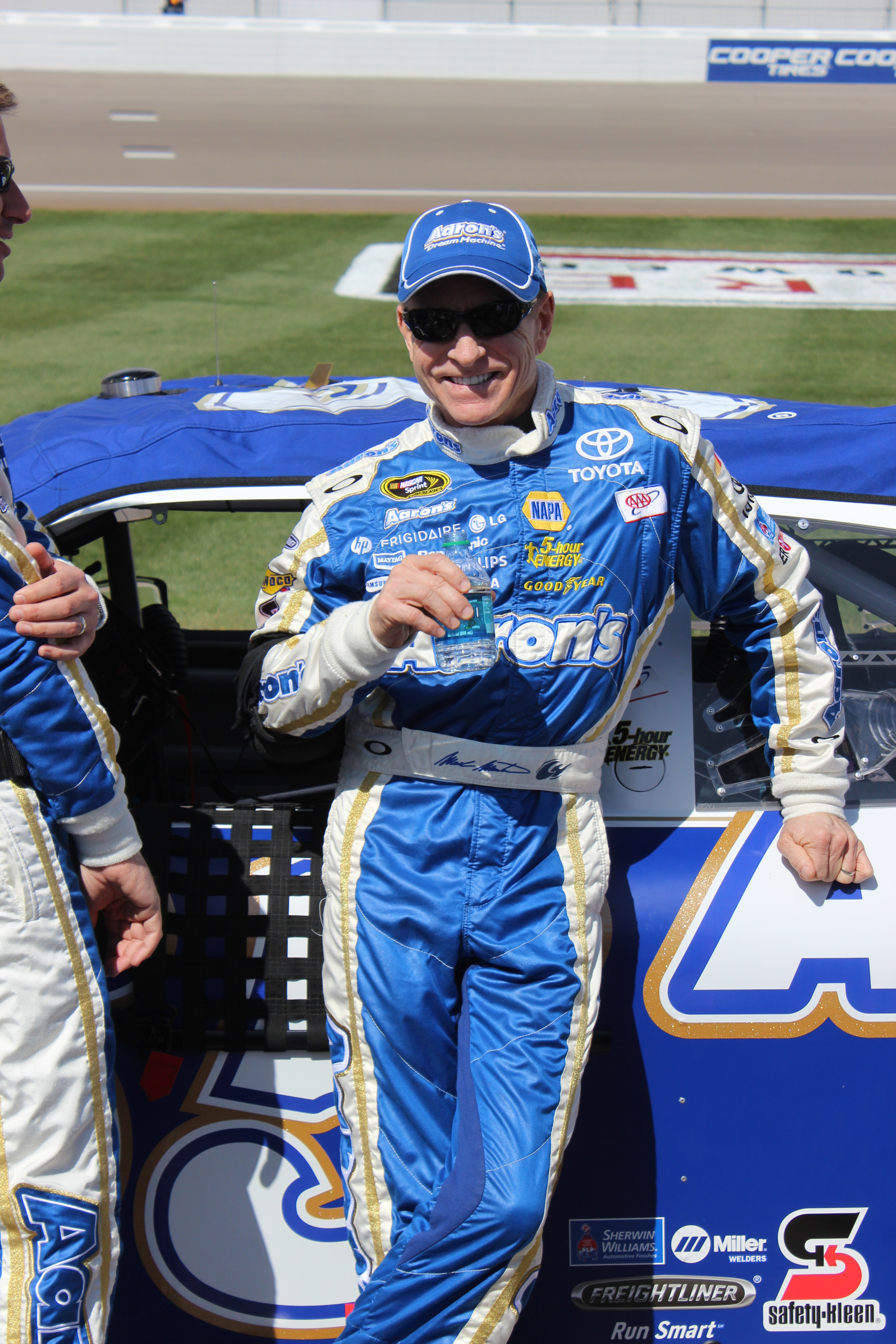
Mark Martin won the pole position, after having the fastest time of 21.040 seconds.

Two practice sessions were held before the race on Friday. The first session lasted 120 minutes long, while the second was 45 minutes long. Mark Martin was quickest with a time of 21.309 seconds in the first session, under nine-hundredths of a second faster than Biffle. Paul Menard was third, followed by Clint Bowyer, Joey Logano, and Johnson. A. J. Allmendinger was seventh, still within two-tenths of a second of Martin's time. Also in the first session, Menard collided into the wall after his throttle stuck, causing a red-flag to clean the track. In the second practice session, Earnhardt Jr. was fastest with a time of 21.800 seconds, only 0.026 seconds quicker than second-placed Edwards. Landon Cassill took third place, ahead of Jeff Gordon, Kyle Busch and Bowyer. Michael McDowell managed to be seventh quickest.

Forty-five cars were entered for qualifying, but only forty-three would race because of NASCAR's qualifying procedure. Martin clinched his 53rd pole position during his career, with a time of 21.040 seconds. He was joined on the front row of the grid by Edwards. Harvick qualified third, Allmendinger took fourth, and Kyle Busch started fifth. Gordon, Hamlin, Truex Jr., Kasey Kahne, and Earnhardt Jr. rounded out the first ten positions. The two drivers who failed to qualify for the race were Scott Riggs and J. J. Yeley, who had times of 21.807 and 22.030 seconds.

== Results ==
=== Qualifying ===
Grid	No.	Driver	Team	Manufacturer	Time	Speed
1	55	Mark Martin	Michael Waltrip Racing	Toyota	21.040	128.327
2	99	Carl Edwards	Roush Fenway Racing	Ford	21.046	128.290
3	29	Kevin Harvick	Richard Childress Racing	Chevrolet	21.087	128.041
4	22	A. J. Allmendinger	Penske Racing	Dodge	21.100	127.962
5	18	Kyle Busch	Joe Gibbs Racing	Toyota	21.101	127.956
6	24	Jeff Gordon	Hendrick Motorsports	Chevrolet	21.135	127.750
7	11	Denny Hamlin	Joe Gibbs Racing	Toyota	21.138	127.732
8	56	Martin Truex Jr.	Michael Waltrip Racing	Toyota	21.147	127.678
9	5	Kasey Kahne	Hendrick Motorsports	Chevrolet	21.161	127.593
10	88	Dale Earnhardt Jr.	Hendrick Motorsports	Chevrolet	21.169	127.545
11	43	Aric Almirola	Richard Petty Motorsports	Ford	21.184	127.455
12	39	Ryan Newman	Stewart–Haas Racing	Chevrolet	21.194	127.395
13	51	Kurt Busch	Phoenix Racing	Chevrolet	21.205	127.328
14	9	Marcos Ambrose	Richard Petty Motorsports	Ford	21.213	127.280
15	78	Regan Smith	Furniture Row Racing	Chevrolet	21.225	127.209
16	2	Brad Keselowski	Penske Racing	Dodge	21.261	126.993
17	36	Dave Blaney	Tommy Baldwin Racing	Chevrolet	21.266	126.963
18	20	Joey Logano	Joe Gibbs Racing	Toyota	21.274	126.915
19	47	Bobby Labonte	JTG Daugherty Racing	Toyota	21.278	126.892
20	42	Juan Pablo Montoya	Earnhardt Ganassi Racing	Chevrolet	21.290	126.820
21	83	Landon Cassill	BK Racing	Toyota	21.294	126.796
22	14	Tony Stewart	Stewart–Haas Racing	Chevrolet	21.302	126.749
23	15	Clint Bowyer	Michael Waltrip Racing	Toyota	21.311	126.695
24	17	Matt Kenseth	Roush Fenway Racing	Ford	21.313	126.683
25	98	Michael McDowell	Phil Parsons Racing	Ford	21.325	126.612
26	13	Casey Mears	Germain Racing	Ford	21.346	126.487
27	48	Jimmie Johnson	Hendrick Motorsports	Chevrolet	21.350	126.464
28	16	Greg Biffle	Roush Fenway Racing	Ford	21.356	126.428
29	93	Travis Kvapil	BK Racing	Toyota	21.369	126.351
30	31	Jeff Burton	Richard Childress Racing	Chevrolet	21.408	126.121
31	27	Paul Menard	Richard Childress Racing	Chevrolet	21.408	126.121
32	26	Josh Wise	Front Row Motorsports	Ford	21.411	126.103
33	10	David Reutimann	Tommy Baldwin Racing	Chevrolet	21.423	126.033
34	30	David Stremme	Inception Motorsports	Toyota	21.432	125.980
35	87	Joe Nemechek	NEMCO Motorsports	Toyota	21.448	125.886
36	95	Scott Speed	Leavine Family Racing	Ford	21.456	125.839
37	1	Jamie McMurray	Earnhardt Ganassi Racing	Chevrolet	21.485	125.669
38	34	David Ragan	Front Row Motorsports	Ford	21.503	125.564
39	19	Mike Bliss	Humphrey-Smith Racing	Toyota	21.545	125.319
40	33	Stephen Leicht	Circle Sport	Chevrolet	21.574	125.151
41	74	Cole Whitt	Turn One Racing	Chevrolet	21.663	124.636
42	38	David Gilliland	Front Row Motorsports	Ford	21.690	124.481
43	32	Reed Sorenson	FAS Lane Racing	Ford	21.705	124.395
Failed to Qualify
	23	Scott Riggs	R3 Motorsports	Chevrolet	21.807	123.813
	49	J. J. Yeley	Robinson-Blakeney Racing	Toyota	22.030	122.560

=== Race results ===
Pos	Car	Driver	Team	Manufacturer	Laps lead	Points
1	18	Kyle Busch	Joe Gibbs Racing	Toyota	32	47
2	88	Dale Earnhardt Jr.	Hendrick Motorsports	Chevrolet	0	42
3	14	Tony Stewart	Stewart–Haas Racing	Chevrolet	118	42
4	11	Denny Hamlin	Joe Gibbs Racing	Toyota	0	40
5	5	Kasey Kahne	Hendrick Motorsports	Chevrolet	0	39
6	48	Jimmie Johnson	Hendrick Motorsports	Chevrolet	1	39
7	15	Clint Bowyer	Michael Waltrip Racing	Toyota	0	37
8	55	Mark Martin	Michael Waltrip Racing	Toyota	29	37
9	2	Brad Keselowski	Penske Racing	Dodge	0	35
10	99	Carl Edwards	Roush Fenway Racing	Ford	206	36
11	17	Matt Kenseth	Roush Fenway Racing	Ford	0	33
12	42	Juan Pablo Montoya	Earnhardt Ganassi Racing	Chevrolet	0	32
13	27	Paul Menard	Richard Childress Racing	Chevrolet	0	31
14	1	Jamie McMurray	Earnhardt Ganassi Racing	Chevrolet	0	30
15	39	Ryan Newman	Stewart–Haas Racing	Chevrolet	0	29
16	22	A. J. Allmendinger	Penske Racing	Dodge	0	28
17	47	Bobby Labonte	JTG Daugherty Racing	Toyota	0	27
18	16	Greg Biffle	Roush Fenway Racing	Ford	0	26
19	29	Kevin Harvick	Richard Childress Racing	Chevrolet	13	26
20	83	Landon Cassill	BK Racing	Toyota	0	24
21	13	Casey Mears	Germain Racing	Ford	0	23
22	9	Marcos Ambrose	Richard Petty Motorsports	Ford	0	22
23	24	Jeff Gordon	Hendrick Motorsports	Chevrolet	0	21
24	20	Joey Logano	Joe Gibbs Racing	Toyota	0	20
25	56	Martin Truex Jr.	Michael Waltrip Racing	Toyota	0	19
26	43	Aric Almirola	Richard Petty Motorsports	Ford	0	18
27	78	Regan Smith	Furniture Row Racing	Chevrolet	0	17
28	51	Kurt Busch	Phoenix Racing	Chevrolet	0	16
29	36	Dave Blaney	Tommy Baldwin Racing	Chevrolet	0	15
30	93	Travis Kvapil	BK Racing	Toyota	1	15
31	31	Jeff Burton	Richard Childress Racing	Chevrolet	0	13
32	34	David Ragan	Front Row Motorsports	Ford	0	12
33	10	David Reutimann	Tommy Baldwin Racing	Chevrolet	0	11
34	32	Reed Sorenson (i)	FAS Lane Racing	Ford	0	0
35	33	Stephen Leicht	Circle Sport	Chevrolet	0	9
36	38	David Gilliland	Front Row Motorsports	Ford	0	8
37	30	David Stremme	Inception Motorsports	Toyota	0	7
38	26	Josh Wise (R)	Front Row Motorsports	Ford	0	6
39	98	Michael McDowell	Phil Parsons Racing	Ford	0	5
40	74	Cole Whitt (i)	Turn One Racing	Chevrolet	0	0
41	87	Joe Nemechek (i)	NEMCO Motorsports	Toyota	0	0
42	19	Mike Bliss (i)	Humphrey-Smith Racing	Toyota	0	0
43	95	Scott Speed	Leavine Family Racing	Ford	0	1

== Standings after the race ==
Drivers' Championship standings

Pos	Driver	Points
1	Greg Biffle	338
2	Dale Earnhardt, Jr.	333
3	Denny Hamlin	329
4	Matt Kenseth	328
5	Martin Truex Jr	316

Manufacturers' Championship standings

Pos	Manufacturer	Points
1		
2		
3		
4		

- Note: Only the top five positions are included for the driver standings.

Previous race: 2012 STP 400	Sprint Cup Series; 2012 season	Next race: 2012 Aaron's 499
