= Turn One Racing =

Former NASCAR team

- Owner(s): Stacy Compton
- Base: Concord, North Carolina
- Series: Sprint Cup Series; Camping World Truck Series
- Race drivers: Stacy Compton, Cole Whitt, Dakoda Armstrong, Tony Raines, Reed Sorenson, Chad McCumbee, Narain Karthikeyan, Johnny Benson, Terry Cook, Jack Sprague, Justin Marks, Grant Enfinger, J. R. Fitzpatrick, Ricky Rudd
- Manufacturer: Chevrolet; Toyota
- Opened: 2005
- Closed: 2013

Career
- Latest race: 2013 Ford EcoBoost 200
- Drivers' Championships: 0
- Race victories: 3
- Pole positions: 0

Turn One Racing (formerly Wyler Racing) was an American NASCAR motor racing team that competed in the NASCAR Camping World Truck Series. The team was owned by Ohio car dealer Jeff Wyler until 2009 when driver Stacy Compton bought the assets of Wyler Racing and moved the team's base to Compton's former Cup Series team, the former Melling Racing shop, in Concord, North Carolina.

== Sprint Cup Series ==
On October 6, 2006, Wyler Racing tested a Toyota Camry Car of Tomorrow at Talladega Superspeedway with Ricky Rudd as the driver. During the 2007 season, the team competed in their first NASCAR Nextel Cup race in the Crown Royal Presents The Jim Stewart 400 with Johnny Benson driving the number 46 Toyota Camry. In the race, the team recorded a finishing position of thirty-first.

=== Car No. 46 results ===
Year	Driver	No.	Make	1	2	3	4	5	6	7	8	9	10	11	12	13	14	15	16	17	18	19	20	21	22	23	24	25	26	27	28	29	30	31	32	33	34	35	36	NSCC	Pts
2007	Johnny Benson Jr.	46	Toyota	DAY	CAL	LVS	ATL	BRI	MAR	TEX	PHO	TAL	RCH; 31	DAR	CLT	DOV	POC	MCH	SON	NHA	DAY	CHI	IND	POC	GLN	MCH	BRI	CAL	RCH	NHA	DOV	KAN	TAL	CLT	MAR	ATL	TEX	PHO	HOM	57th	70

After a five-year hiatus, the team planned to return to the series with an alliance with Richard Childress Racing. in 2012 by competing in eight to ten races, beginning at Phoenix International Raceway. Stacy Compton was entered to run the 2012 Food City 500 at Bristol Motor Speedway, but Reed Sorenson qualified the car. In the race, Sorenson finished 42nd. After two races with the team, Sorenson moved to FAS Lane Racing to drive the number 32 car.

=== Car No. 74 results ===
Year	Driver	No.	Make	1	2	3	4	5	6	7	8	9	10	11	12	13	14	15	16	17	18	19	20	21	22	23	24	25	26	27	28	29	30	31	32	33	34	35	36	NSCC	Pts
2012	Reed Sorenson	74	Chevy	DAY	PHO	LVS	BRI; 42	CAL; 42	MAR; 43																															50th	22
2012	Stacy Compton	74	Chevy							TEX; DNQ							POC; 39	MCH; DNQ	SON	KEN; Wth	DAY	NHA	IND	POC	GLN	MCH	BRI	ATL	RCH	CHI	NHA	DOV	TAL	CLT	KAN	MAR	TEX	PHO	HOM	50th	22
2012	Tony Raines	74	Chevy								KAN; DNQ																													50th	22
2012	Cole Whitt	74	Chevy									RCH; 40	TAL	DAR; 38	CLT; 42	DOV; DNQ																								50th	22

== Camping World Truck Series ==
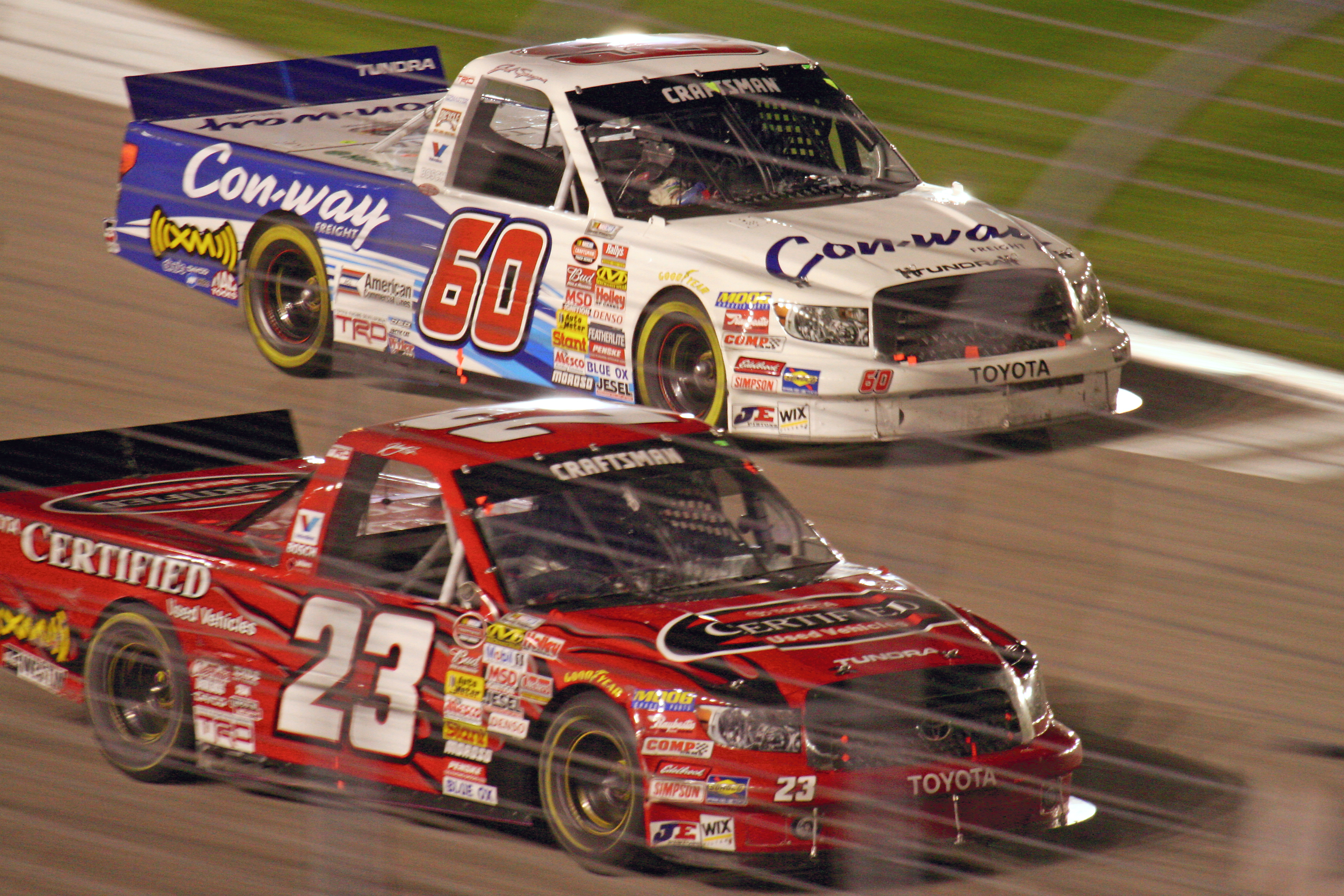
The 60 truck in 2007.

Purchasing equipment from the defunct Fiddleback Racing, the 60 team began running in 2005 at The Milwaukee Mile, when Chad Chaffin finished seventeenth. Chaffin ran ten races for the team that season, posting a top-ten at the Sylvania 200. At the end of the season, he was replaced by Sprague, who had three top-tens in five starts for the team. In 2006, Con-way became the team's new sponsor, and Sprague responded with two wins and a fifth-place finish in points. The following year, Sprague won the first race of the season at Daytona, but fell to ninth in the standings.

Sprague and Con-way left at the end of 2007 for Kevin Harvick Incorporated and Roush Fenway Racing respectively. The team was to merge with South Point Racing to form Wyler-Gaughan Racing in 2008, but the deal fell through. Richard Johns was to be the driver of the No. 60, bringing along sponsorship from havfun.com for both the 2008 and 2009 seasons, but the deal fell through. The team replaced Johns with Terry Cook, who was originally scheduled to drive a second truck, the No. 06. Cook had two top-fives and was running tenth in points when the team released Cook and replaced him with Sprague. For 2009, Compton drove the No. 60 mostly unsponsored until Safe Auto Insurance Company signed a 2-year deal to sponsor the team. Near the end of 2009, Wyler was unsure if the team would be able to continue into 2010, and Compton purchased the No. 60 truck in late 2009 so that the team could continue running. The team ran as Wyler Racing for most of 2010 until Compton renamed the team Turn One Racing, LLC. India's Narain Karthikeyan shared the driver seat with Compton starting at Martinsville Speedway and selected events, with Compton serving as Karthikeyan's driving coach. The team added on the No. 64 Truck with Chase Mattioli driving at Pocono. With Safe Auto departing for ThorSport Racing and Karthikeyan returning to F1 to drive for Hispania Racing, Red Bull development driver Cole Whitt, who ran the No. 60 at Homestead-Miami Speedway, drove the No. 60 full-time for Rookie of the Year with Red Bull sponsorship. Justin Marks returned with GoPro sponsorship for the first 12 races, before being replaced by various drivers to fill out the rest of the year.

Turn One Racing announced in 2011 that they intended to field a truck for Johnny Benson in 2012, but the deal fell through due to sponsorship issues. Cole Whitt left the team to drive for JR Motorsports in the Nationwide Series. Turn One Racing announced that they would be running a partial Sprint Cup schedule. J. R. Fitzpatrick drove the No. 60 with sponsorship from Equipment Express for the first two races, but decided to race in the Canadian Tire Series for the remainder of 2012. He was replaced by Chad McCumbee and Grant Enfinger for the following three races in the hopes of securing more sponsorship. Crew chief Kevin Starland left to join RBR Motorsports. After Starland's departure, the Truck team went on hiatus for the rest of 2012. The team was revived in 2013 with the arrival of Dakoda Armstrong and Winfield. Later in the season, on August 5, Joe Shear Jr., son of former driver Joe Shear, joined the No. 60 team from ThorSport Racing. The team once again shut down for the 2014 season.

=== Truck No. 06 results ===
Year	Driver	No.	Make	1	2	3	4	5	6	7	8	9	10	11	12	13	14	15	16	17	18	19	20	21	22	23	24	25	NCWTC	Pts
2009	Johnny Chapman	06	Toyota	DAY; 32	CAL; 33	ATL	MAR	KAN	CLT	DOV	TEX	MCH	MLW	MEM	KEN	IRP	NSH	BRI	CHI	IOW	GTW	NHA	LVS	MAR	TAL	TEX	PHO	HOM	64th	131

=== Truck No. 60 results ===
Year	Driver	No.	Make	1	2	3	4	5	6	7	8	9	10	11	12	13	14	15	16	17	18	19	20	21	22	23	24	25	NCWTC	Pts
2005	Chad Chaffin	60	Toyota	DAY	CAL	ATL	MAR	GTY	MFD	CLT	DOV	TEX	MCH	MLW; 17	KAN; 15	KEN; 33	MEM; 28	IRP; 21	NSH; 20	BRI; 23	RCH; 27	NHA; 9	LVS; 16						33rd	1589
2005	Jack Sprague	60	Toyota																					MAR; 29	ATL; 4	TEX; 6	PHO; 16	HOM; 2	33rd	1589
2006	Jack Sprague	60	Toyota	DAY; 5	CAL; 5	ATL; 17	MAR; 17	GTY; 4	CLT; 34	MFD; 2	DOV; 9	TEX; 11	MCH; 10	MLW; 4	KAN; 29	KEN; 11	MEM; 1	IRP; 28	NSH; 2	BRI; 23	NHA; 18	LVS; 13	TAL; 33	MAR; 1	ATL; 10	TEX; 4	PHO; 7	HOM; 5	6th	3328
2007	Jack Sprague	60	Toyota	DAY; 1	CAL; 3	ATL; 23	MAR; 16	KAN; 3	CLT; 34	MFD; 2	DOV; 28	TEX; 26	MCH; 29	MLW; 11	MEM; 2	KEN; 13	IRP; 9	NSH; 15	BRI; 8	GTW; 32	NHA; 24	LVS; 32	TAL; 27	MAR; 2	ATL; 25	TEX; 6	PHO; 10	HOM; 16	10th	3001
2008	Terry Cook	60	Toyota	DAY; 30	CAL; 4	ATL; 8	MAR; 13	KAN; 19	CLT; 6	MFD; 4	DOV; 13	TEX; 16	MCH; 10	MLW; 9	MEM; 17	KEN; 8	IRP; 11	NSH; 12	BRI; 23	GTW; 17	NHA; 18	LVS; 23	TAL; 23						12th	3047
2008	Jack Sprague	60	Toyota																					MAR; 11	ATL; 13	TEX; 15	PHO; 17	HOM; 20	12th	3047
2009	Stacy Compton	60	Toyota	DAY; 14	CAL; 15	ATL; 19	MAR; 6	KAN; 13	CLT; 9	DOV; 13	TEX; 21	MCH; 19	MLW; 6	MEM; 17	KEN; 12	IRP; 8	NSH; 15	BRI; 9	CHI; 12	IOW; 16	GTW; 8	NHA; 6	LVS; 20	MAR; 14	TAL; 7	TEX; 22	PHO; 10	HOM; 21	13th	3124
2010	Stacy Compton	60	Toyota	DAY; 7	ATL; 19																								14th	2898
2010	Stacy Compton	60	Chevy				NSH; 9		DOV; 13			MCH; 11	IOW; 6	GTY; 19		POC; 17		DAR; 8	BRI; 34		KEN; 12	NHA; 16		MAR; 8		TEX; 14	PHO; 14		14th	2898
2010	Narain Karthikeyan	60	Chevy			MAR; 13		KAN; 36		CLT; 17	TEX; 11				IRP; 20		NSH; 17			CHI; 14			LVS; 27		TAL; 13				14th	2898
2010	Cole Whitt	60	Chevy																									HOM; 28	14th	2898
2011	Cole Whitt	60	Chevy	DAY; DNQ	PHO; 6	DAR; 8	MAR; 6	NSH; 12	DOV; 2	CLT; 3	KAN; 15	TEX; 28	KEN; 26	IOW; 6	NSH; 19	IRP; 8	POC; 15	MCH; 10	BRI; 12	ATL; 32	CHI; 9	NHA; 15	KEN; 8	LVS; 8	TAL; 14	MAR; 27	TEX; 17	HOM; 22	12th	734
2012	J. R. Fitzpatrick	60	Chevy	DAY; 34	MAR; 12																								42nd	102
2012	Grant Enfinger	60	Chevy			CAR; 36																							42nd	102
2012	Chad McCumbee	60	Chevy				KAN; 30	CLT; 31	DOV	TEX	KEN	IOW	CHI	POC	MCH	BRI	ATL	IOW	KEN	LVS	TAL								42nd	102
2012	Peyton Sellers	60	Chevy																			MAR; 20	TEX	PHO	HOM				42nd	102
2013	Dakoda Armstrong	60	Chevy	DAY; 19	MAR; 7	CAR; 17	KAN; 12	CLT; 12	DOV; 21	TEX; 11	KEN; 21	IOW; 10	ELD; 11	POC; 18	MCH; 13	BRI; 18	MSP; 19	IOW; 16	CHI; 17	LVS; 16	TAL; 5	MAR; 18	TEX; 17	PHO; 19	HOM; 23				15th	628

=== Truck No. 64 results ===
Year	Driver	No.	Make	1	2	3	4	5	6	7	8	9	10	11	12	13	14	15	16	17	18	19	20	21	22	23	24	25	NCWTC	Pts
2010	Chase Mattioli	64	Chevy	DAY	ATL	MAR	NSH	KAN	DOV	CLT	TEX	MCH	IOW	GTW	IRP	POC; 30	NSH	DAR	BRI	CHI	KEN								63rd	100
2010	Peyton Sellers	64	Chevy																			NHA; 21	LVS	MAR	TAL	TEX	PHO	HOM	63rd	100

=== Truck No. 66 results ===
Year	Driver	No.	Make	1	2	3	4	5	6	7	8	9	10	11	12	13	14	15	16	17	18	19	20	21	22	23	24	25	NCWTC	Pts
2011	Justin Marks	66	Chevy	DAY; 24	PHO; 18	DAR; 24	MAR; 21	NSH; 25	DOV; 10	CLT; 9	KAN; 20	TEX; 17	KEN; 35	IOW; 28	NSH; 21														23rd	529
2011	Ross Chastain	66	Chevy													IRP; 10			BRI; 19				KEN; 22				TEX; 16		23rd	529
2011	Peyton Sellers	66	Chevy														POC; 25	MCH; 28											23rd	529
2011	Chris Cockrum	66	Chevy																	ATL; 24									23rd	529
2011	J. J. Yeley	66	Chevy																		CHI; 30	NHA; 28			TAL; 36				23rd	529
2011	Max Gresham	66	Chevy																					LVS; 25		MAR; 25		HOM; 31	23rd	529
