= 2012 Pocono 400 =

Race details
- Race 14 of 36 in the 2012 NASCAR Sprint Cup Series
- 2012 Pocono 400 program cover
- Date: June 10, 2012
- Location: Pocono Raceway in Long Pond, Pennsylvania
- Course: Permanent racing facility
- Course length: 2.5 miles (4.023 km)
- Distance: 160 laps, 400 mi (643.737 km)
- Weather: Clear with a high temperature around 84 °F (29 °C); wind out of the WNW at 7 mph (11 km/h)
- Average speed: 131.004 miles per hour (210.831 km/h)

Pole position
Driver	Joey Logano	Joe Gibbs Racing
- Time: 50.112

Most laps led
Driver	Joey Logano	Joe Gibbs Racing
- Laps: 49

Winner
No. 20	Joey Logano	Joe Gibbs Racing

Television in the United States
- Network: TNT
- Announcers: Adam Alexander, Kyle Petty and Wally Dallenbach Jr.

The 2012 Pocono 400 Presented by #NASCAR was a NASCAR Sprint Cup Series stock car race held on June 10, 2012, at Pocono Raceway in Long Pond, Pennsylvania, United States. Contested over 160 laps, it was the fourteenth race of the 2012 NASCAR Sprint Cup Series season. Joey Logano of Joe Gibbs Racing won the race from the pole (the second of his career, and the first to have come in a race that went the scheduled distance) while Mark Martin finished second and Tony Stewart finished third.

The race logo for the 2012 Pocono 400.

There were seven cautions and 21 lead changes among ten different drivers during the race. Logano's win moved him to 15th position in the drivers' championship, 125 points behind leader Matt Kenseth and 18 ahead of Kasey Kahne in 16th. In the Manufacturers' Championship, Chevrolet maintained the first position with 96 points, 13 ahead of Toyota. Ford was placed third with 71 points, 13 ahead of Dodge with 22 races remaining in the season.

== Report ==
=== Background ===
Pocono Raceway, the race track where the race was held.

Pocono Raceway is one of six superspeedways to hold NASCAR races, the others being Daytona International Speedway, Michigan International Speedway, Auto Club Speedway, Indianapolis Motor Speedway and Talladega Superspeedway. The standard track at Pocono Raceway is a three-turn superspeedway that is 2.5 miles (4.0 km) long. The track's turns are banked differently; the first is banked at 14°, the second turn at 8° and the final turn with 6°. However, each of the three straightaways are banked at 2°. Jeff Gordon was the defending race winner.

In preparation for the race, NASCAR held three test sessions on June 6–7, 2012 for teams to test the newer pavement at Pocono, as the track had been repaved following the previous year's events. During the first test session, which was held on June 6 for four hours, Mark Martin was quickest ahead of A. J. Allmendinger with a speed of 175.380 miles per hour (282.247 km/h) and a time of . Allmendinger was quickest in the first of two test sessions on June 7 with a time of 50.793 seconds and a speed of 177.190 miles per hour (285.160 km/h), while Kasey Kahne was quickest in the second test session with a time of 50.142 seconds and a speed of 179.490 miles per hour (288.861 km/h). Top speeds at the end of the front straightaway approached 212 miles per hour (341 km/h), however NASCAR determined that the use of restrictor plates would not be required.

On June 5, 2012, NASCAR suspended Phoenix Racing driver Kurt Busch from the race after verbally abusing a media member and taking actions detrimental to stock car racing one week earlier at Dover International Speedway.

Before the race, Greg Biffle led the Drivers' Championship with 486 points, and Matt Kenseth stood in second with 485. Dale Earnhardt Jr. was third in the Drivers' Championship with 476, twelve points ahead of Denny Hamlin and twenty-three ahead of Jimmie Johnson in fourth and fifth. Martin Truex Jr., with 453, was one point ahead of Kevin Harvick, as Tony Stewart with 407 points, was one ahead of Kyle Busch and two in front of Clint Bowyer. In the Manufacturers' Championship, Chevrolet was leading with 90 points, sixteen points ahead of Toyota. Ford, with 67 points, was twelve points ahead of Dodge in the battle for third.

=== Practice and qualifying ===
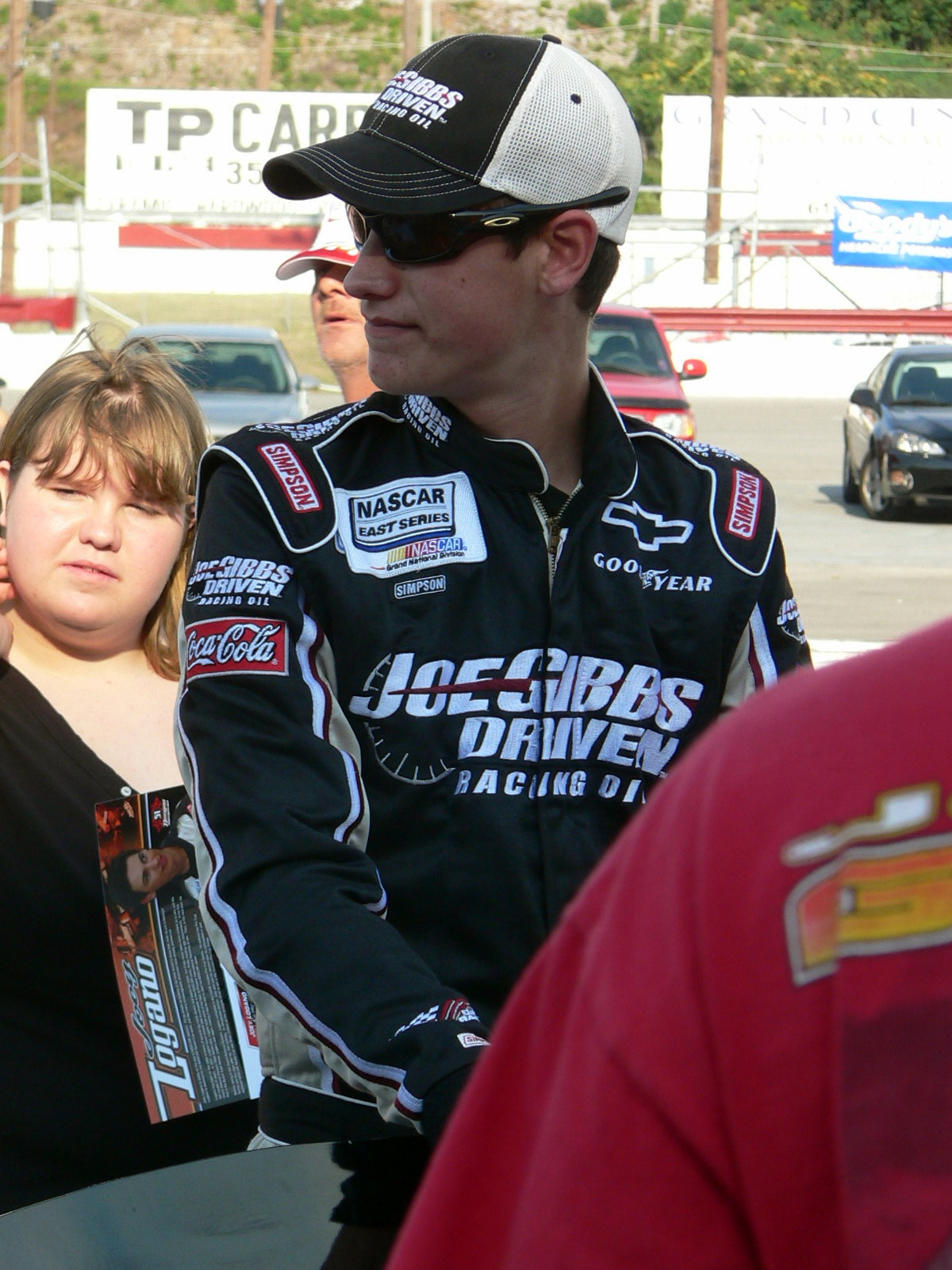
Joe Gibbs Racing driver Joey Logano won the pole position

Two practice sessions were also held before the race on June 8, 2012. The first session was 85 minutes long, while the second was 90 minutes. Martin was quickest with a time of 50.173 seconds in the first session, 0.124 faster than Jamie McMurray. Earnhardt Jr. was third quickest, followed by Johnson, Allmendinger, and Ryan Newman. Kahne was seventh, still within half of a second of Martin's time. In the second and final practice, Joey Logano was quickest with a time of 50.139 seconds. Carl Edwards followed in second, ahead of Gordon and Paul Menard. Kyle Busch was fifth quickest, with a time of 50.409 seconds. Kahne, Biffle, Brad Keselowski, Allmendinger, and Marcos Ambrose rounded out the first ten positions. McMurray, who was second quickest in the first session, could only manage 34th. Also in the first practice session, Stephen Leicht struck a groundhog with his car, after Truex Jr. brushed the SAFER barrier attempting to avoid it.

"I think it's really hard to determine what makes this track faster right now. I don't know if being a little warmer makes it faster. I thought, as we went on and that speedy-dry and the groove got cleaned off, that people would go a lot faster, so it's a surprise to me."

— Carl Edwards said about the oil-dry problem.

Forty-four cars were entered for qualifying on June 9, 2012, but only forty-three could qualify for the race because of NASCAR's qualifying procedure. After having problems with oil-dry in turn one, Logano of Joe Gibbs Racing clinched the fourth pole position of his Sprint Cup Series career, with a time of 50.112 seconds, which beat the old track record. He was joined on the front row of the grid by Edwards. Menard qualified third, Kyle Busch took fourth, and Hamlin started fifth. Martin, Regan Smith, Earnhardt Jr., Ambrose and Kahne rounded out the top ten. The driver that failed to qualify for the race was David Stremme.

Once the qualifying session was completed, Logano stated, "The track was dirty. When I went out there and got to that trouble spot, I got loose a little bit and didn't get to the bottom as well as I wanted to. So I felt like I left a tenth and a half [of a second] or so right there, but I felt like I nailed [Turns] 2 and 3 pretty well. I was hoping it would be in the top five, and it ended up being good enough."

=== Race ===
The race, the fourteenth in the season, began at 1:20 p.m. EDT and was televised live in the United States on TNT. The conditions on the grid were dry before the race with the air temperature around 84 °F (29 °C). Mike Kloton, Archdiocese of Scranton, Pennsylvania began pre-race ceremonies, by giving the invocation. Next, Naomi Scott performed the national anthem, and Dr. Rose Mattioli, chairman of Pocono Raceway, gave the command for drivers to start their engines.

At the start of the race, Logano maintained his pole position lead as Hamlin collided into Edwards going into the first turn, causing Edwards' car to rub against the tire. Also on the first lap, the first caution was given after Landon Cassill spun sideways and collided into Truex Jr. in the third turn. Allmendinger was also involved in the accident. During the caution, Edwards pitted to repair damages to his car, as Cassill drove to the garage. On the sixth lap, Logano led Menard on the restart. Two laps later, the three drivers involved in the first caution were forced to pit after being penalized by NASCAR. By the twelfth lap, Logano had extended his lead to two seconds over second placed Menard. Two laps later, J. J. Yeley, Tony Raines and Reed Sorenson crashed into the wall, prompting the second caution. During the caution most of the front-runners pitted while Hamlin stayed on-track. Also under the caution, Montoya drove to the garage after having damage to the right side of his car, as Bowyer received a pit road speeding penalty.

At the lap 20 restart, McMurray led Keselowski, Hamlin, and Logano into the first turn. On the following lap, Leicht made a pit stop, as Hamlin took the first position. Hamlin, who had won four previous times at Pocono Raceway, continued to extend his lead to 1.1 seconds by the 25th lap. Six laps later on lap 31, Joe Nemechek pitted, only two laps before Hamlin and Keselowski, and three before McMurray. On the 34th lap, Keselowski received a pit road speeding penalty, as Earnhardt Jr. became the leader. Four laps later, Casey Mears drove to the garage, while Michael McDowell pitted. At lap 42, Gordon and Ambrose started the second set of green flag pit stops. On the following lap, Johnson pitted, as Gordon had to return to pit road after receiving a pit road speeding penalty. On the 44th lap, Kyle Busch, Logano and Ambrose pitted, as Johnson received a pit road speeding penalty. Johnson received a second penalty for speeding on pit road on the next lap. Kyle Busch, Harvick, David Reutimann and Newman were also given a pit road speeding penalty. Following pit stops, Hamlin was the leader ahead of Earnhardt Jr.

On the 58th lap, Kenseth passed McMurray for the third position, as Johnson remained a lap behind the leaders after three penalties. Two laps later, Earnhardt Jr. reclaimed the lead from Hamlin. At lap 64, McMurray pitted, as Hamlin told his team he ran out of fuel. The third caution was given two laps later after Allmendinger crashed in the second turn from having no brakes. Most of the leaders pitted during the caution as McMurray, who pitted a few laps earlier, stayed on the track. Also during the caution, Jeff Burton became the 17th driver to be penalized for speeding on pit road, as Johnson chose the wave-around to return to the lead lap. At the lap 72 restart, McMurray was the leader ahead of Kahne. Two laps later, the fourth caution was given after debris was located on the track. McMurray, Hamlin, Kahne and Johnson pitted during the caution, as Kyle Busch drove to the garage. On the 83rd lap, the race resumed with Biffle the leader ahead of Martin, Earnhardt Jr., Logano and Kenseth.

Nine laps later, Kenseth and Earnhardt Jr. passed Biffle to claim the first two positions. On the 98th lap, Kyle Busch retired from the race after having engine problems. On the following lap, Edwards began another set of green flag pit stops. On the 101st lap, Ambrose, Newman, Johnson and three others pitted, just one lap before Kenseth, Earnhardt, and Biffle. After every team pitted, Earnhardt Jr. reclaimed the first position, as Biffle reported engine problems to his team. By lap 118, Newman and Johnson were placed sixth and seventh. Five laps later, the fifth caution was given after debris from Aric Almirola collision with the wall was located on the track. During the caution most of the front-runners pitted. At the lap 129 restart, Logano led Martin into the first turn. During the next three laps, Keselowski, Dave Blaney, Reutimann and Harvick pitted.

At lap 138, Kahne collided into the turn 2 wall, prompting the sixth caution. Only some of the drivers chose to pit during the caution, leaving Logano and Martin in the first two positions for the restart on lap 143. Six laps later, the seventh caution was given after debris was located. Logano and Martin continued to be in the first two positions at the lap 152 restart. During the same lap, Martin claimed the first position from Logano, as Stewart, Hamlin and Johnson rounded out the first five positions. With four laps remaining, Logano reclaimed the lead from Martin with a bump-and-run. Logano maintained the first position to claim his second Sprint Cup Series career win. Martin took the second position ahead of Stewart and Johnson. Hamlin finished in the fifth position, as Bowyer, Kenseth, Earnhardt Jr., Menard and McMurray completed the first ten positions.

== Results ==
=== Qualifying ===
Grid	No.	Driver	Team	Manufacturer	Time (s)	Speed
1	20	Joey Logano	Joe Gibbs Racing	Toyota	50.112	179.598 mph (289.035 km/h)
2	99	Carl Edwards	Roush Fenway Racing	Ford	50.317	178.866 mph (287.857 km/h)
3	27	Paul Menard	Richard Childress Racing	Chevrolet	50.397	178.582 mph (287.400 km/h)
4	18	Kyle Busch	Joe Gibbs Racing	Toyota	50.399	178.575 mph (287.389 km/h)
5	11	Denny Hamlin	Joe Gibbs Racing	Toyota	50.408	178.543 mph (287.337 km/h)
6	55	Mark Martin	Michael Waltrip Racing	Toyota	50.497	178.228 mph (286.830 km/h)
7	78	Regan Smith	Furniture Row Racing	Chevrolet	50.517	178.158 mph (286.718 km/h)
8	88	Dale Earnhardt Jr.	Hendrick Motorsports	Chevrolet	50.579	177.939 mph (286.365 km/h)
9	9	Marcos Ambrose	Richard Petty Motorsports	Ford	50.601	177.862 mph (286.241 km/h)
10	5	Kasey Kahne	Hendrick Motorsports	Chevrolet	50.612	177.823 mph (286.178 km/h)
11	1	Jamie McMurray	Earnhardt Ganassi Racing	Chevrolet	50.659	177.658 mph (285.913 km/h)
12	24	Jeff Gordon	Hendrick Motorsports	Chevrolet	50.694	177.536 mph (285.716 km/h)
13	16	Greg Biffle	Roush Fenway Racing	Ford	50.699	177.518 mph (285.688 km/h)
14	17	Matt Kenseth	Roush Fenway Racing	Ford	50.704	177.501 mph (285.660 km/h)
15	83	Landon Cassill	BK Racing	Toyota	50.789	177.204 mph (285.182 km/h)
16	15	Clint Bowyer	Michael Waltrip Racing	Toyota	50.840	177.026 mph (284.896 km/h)
17	42	Juan Pablo Montoya	Earnhardt Ganassi Racing	Chevrolet	50.851	176.988 mph (284.835 km/h)
18	39	Ryan Newman	Stewart–Haas Racing	Chevrolet	50.890	176.852 mph (284.616 km/h)
19	22	A. J. Allmendinger	Penske Racing	Dodge	50.904	176.803 mph (284.537 km/h)
20	31	Jeff Burton	Richard Childress Racing	Chevrolet	50.946	176.658 mph (284.303 km/h)
21	29	Kevin Harvick	Richard Childress Racing	Chevrolet	50.979	176.543 mph (284.118 km/h)
22	14	Tony Stewart	Stewart–Haas Racing	Chevrolet	51.015	176.419 mph (283.919 km/h)
23	56	Martin Truex Jr.	Michael Waltrip Racing	Toyota	51.090	176.160 mph (283.502 km/h)
24	48	Jimmie Johnson	Hendrick Motorsports	Chevrolet	51.093	176.149 mph (283.484 km/h)
25	51	David Reutimann	Phoenix Racing	Chevrolet	51.115	176.074 mph (283.364 km/h)
26	13	Casey Mears	Germain Racing	Ford	51.254	175.596 mph (282.594 km/h)
27	47	Bobby Labonte	JTG Daugherty Racing	Toyota	51.260	175.576 mph (282.562 km/h)
28	19	Mike Bliss	Humphrey Smith Racing	Toyota	51.315	175.387 mph (282.258 km/h)
29	43	Aric Almirola	Richard Petty Motorsports	Ford	51.382	175.159 mph (281.891 km/h)
30	98	Michael McDowell	Phil Parsons Racing	Ford	51.407	175.073 mph (281.753 km/h)
31	2	Brad Keselowski	Penske Racing	Dodge	51.464	174.880 mph (281.442 km/h)
32	49	J. J. Yeley	Robinson-Blakeney Racing	Toyota	51.741	173.943 mph (279.934 km/h)
33	87	Joe Nemechek	NEMCO Motorsports	Toyota	51.763	173.869 mph (279.815 km/h)
34	34	David Ragan	Front Row Motorsports	Ford	51.768	173.853 mph (279.789 km/h)
35	26	Josh Wise	Front Row Motorsports	Ford	51.874	173.497 mph (279.216 km/h)
36	38	David Gilliland	Front Row Motorsports	Ford	51.951	173.240 mph (278.803 km/h)
37	93	Travis Kvapil	BK Racing	Toyota	52.370	171.854 mph (276.572 km/h)
38	23	Scott Riggs	R3 Motorsports	Chevrolet	52.472	171.520 mph (276.035 km/h)
39	74	Cole Whitt	Turn One Racing	Chevrolet	52.584	171.155 mph (275.447 km/h)
40	36	Tony Raines	Tommy Baldwin Racing	Chevrolet	53.760	167.411 mph (269.422 km/h)
41	32	Reed Sorenson	FAS Lane Racing	Ford	—	—
42	10	Dave Blaney	Tommy Baldwin Racing	Chevrolet	—	—
43	33	Stephen Leicht	Circle Sport Racing	Chevrolet	52.834	170.345 mph (274.144 km/h)
Failed to Qualify
	30	David Stremme	Inception Motorsports	Toyota	52.940	170.004 mph (273.595 km/h)

=== Race results ===
Pos	No.	Driver	Team	Manufacturer	Laps	Points
1	20	Joey Logano	Joe Gibbs Racing	Toyota	160	48
2	55	Mark Martin	Michael Waltrip Racing	Toyota	160	43
3	14	Tony Stewart	Stewart–Haas Racing	Chevrolet	160	41
4	48	Jimmie Johnson	Hendrick Motorsports	Chevrolet	160	40
5	11	Denny Hamlin	Joe Gibbs Racing	Toyota	160	40
6	15	Clint Bowyer	Michael Waltrip Racing	Toyota	160	38
7	17	Matt Kenseth	Roush Fenway Racing	Ford	160	38
8	88	Dale Earnhardt Jr.	Hendrick Motorsports	Chevrolet	160	37
9	27	Paul Menard	Richard Childress Racing	Chevrolet	160	35
10	1	Jamie McMurray	Earnhardt Ganassi Racing	Chevrolet	160	35
11	99	Carl Edwards	Roush Fenway Racing	Ford	160	33
12	39	Ryan Newman	Stewart–Haas Racing	Chevrolet	160	32
13	9	Marcos Ambrose	Richard Petty Motorsports	Ford	160	31
14	29	Kevin Harvick	Richard Childress Racing	Chevrolet	160	30
15	31	Jeff Burton	Richard Childress Racing	Chevrolet	160	29
16	78	Regan Smith	Furniture Row Racing	Chevrolet	160	28
17	42	Juan Pablo Montoya	Earnhardt Ganassi Racing	Chevrolet	160	28
18	2	Brad Keselowski	Penske Racing	Dodge	160	26
19	24	Jeff Gordon	Hendrick Motorsports	Chevrolet	160	25
20	56	Martin Truex Jr.	Michael Waltrip Racing	Toyota	160	24
21	51	David Reutimann	Phoenix Racing	Chevrolet	160	23
22	47	Bobby Labonte	JTG Daugherty Racing	Toyota	160	22
23	38	David Gilliland	Front Row Motorsports	Ford	160	22
24	16	Greg Biffle	Roush Fenway Racing	Ford	160	21
25	10	Dave Blaney	Tommy Baldwin Racing	Chevrolet	160	19
26	93	Travis Kvapil	BK Racing	Toyota	160	18
27	34	David Ragan	Front Row Motorsports	Ford	160	18
28	43	Aric Almirola	Richard Petty Motorsports	Ford	158	16
29	5	Kasey Kahne	Hendrick Motorsports	Chevrolet	139	15
30	18	Kyle Busch	Joe Gibbs Racing	Toyota	76	14
31	22	A. J. Allmendinger	Penske Racing	Dodge	64	13
32	36	Tony Raines	Tommy Baldwin Racing	Chevrolet	47	12
33	33	Stephen Leicht	Richard Childress Racing	Chevrolet	39	11
34	98	Michael McDowell	Phil Parsons Racing	Ford	37	10
35	13	Casey Mears	Germain Racing	Ford	36	9
36	49	J. J. Yeley	Robinson-Blakeney Racing	Toyota	33	8
37	87	Joe Nemechek	NEMCO Motorsports	Toyota	30	0
38	19	Mike Bliss	Humphrey Smith Racing	Toyota	26	0
39	74	Stacy Compton	Turn One Racing	Chevrolet	24	5
40	23	Scott Riggs	R3 Motorsports	Chevrolet	19	4
41	32	Reed Sorenson	FAS Lane Racing	Ford	12	0
42	26	Josh Wise	Front Row Motorsports	Ford	12	2
43	83	Landon Cassill	BK Racing	Toyota	1	1

== Standings after the race ==
Drivers' Championship standings

Pos	Driver	Points
1	Matt Kenseth	523
2	Dale Earnhardt Jr.	513
3	Greg Biffle	507
4	Denny Hamlin	504
5	Jimmie Johnson	493

Manufacturers' Championship standings

Pos	Manufacturer	Points
1	Chevrolet	96
2	Toyota	83
3	Ford	71
4	Dodge	58

- Note: Only the top five positions are included for the driver standings.

Previous race: 2012 FedEx 400	Sprint Cup Series; 2012 season	Next race: 2012 Quicken Loans 400
