= 2012 STP 400 =

Race details
- Race 8 of 36 in the 2012 NASCAR Sprint Cup Series
- Date: April 22, 2012
- Location: Kansas Speedway, Kansas City, Kansas
- Course: Permanent racing facility
- Course length: 1.5 miles (2.4 km)
- Distance: 267 laps, 400.5 mi (644.5 km)
- Weather: Sunshine; wind out of the ENE at 5 miles per hour (8.0 km/h)

Pole position
Driver	A. J. Allmendinger	Penske Racing
- Time: 30.683

Most laps led
Driver	Martin Truex Jr.	Michael Waltrip Racing
- Laps: 173

Winner
No. 11	Denny Hamlin	Joe Gibbs Racing

Television in the United States
- Network: Fox Broadcasting Company
- Announcers: Mike Joy, Darrell Waltrip and Larry McReynolds

The 2012 STP 400 was a NASCAR Sprint Cup Series stock car race held on April 22, 2012 at Kansas Speedway in Kansas City, Kansas. Contested over 267 laps, it was the eighth race of the 2012 season. Denny Hamlin of Joe Gibbs Racing took his second win of the season, while Martin Truex Jr. finished second and Jimmie Johnson finished third.

== Report ==
=== Background ===
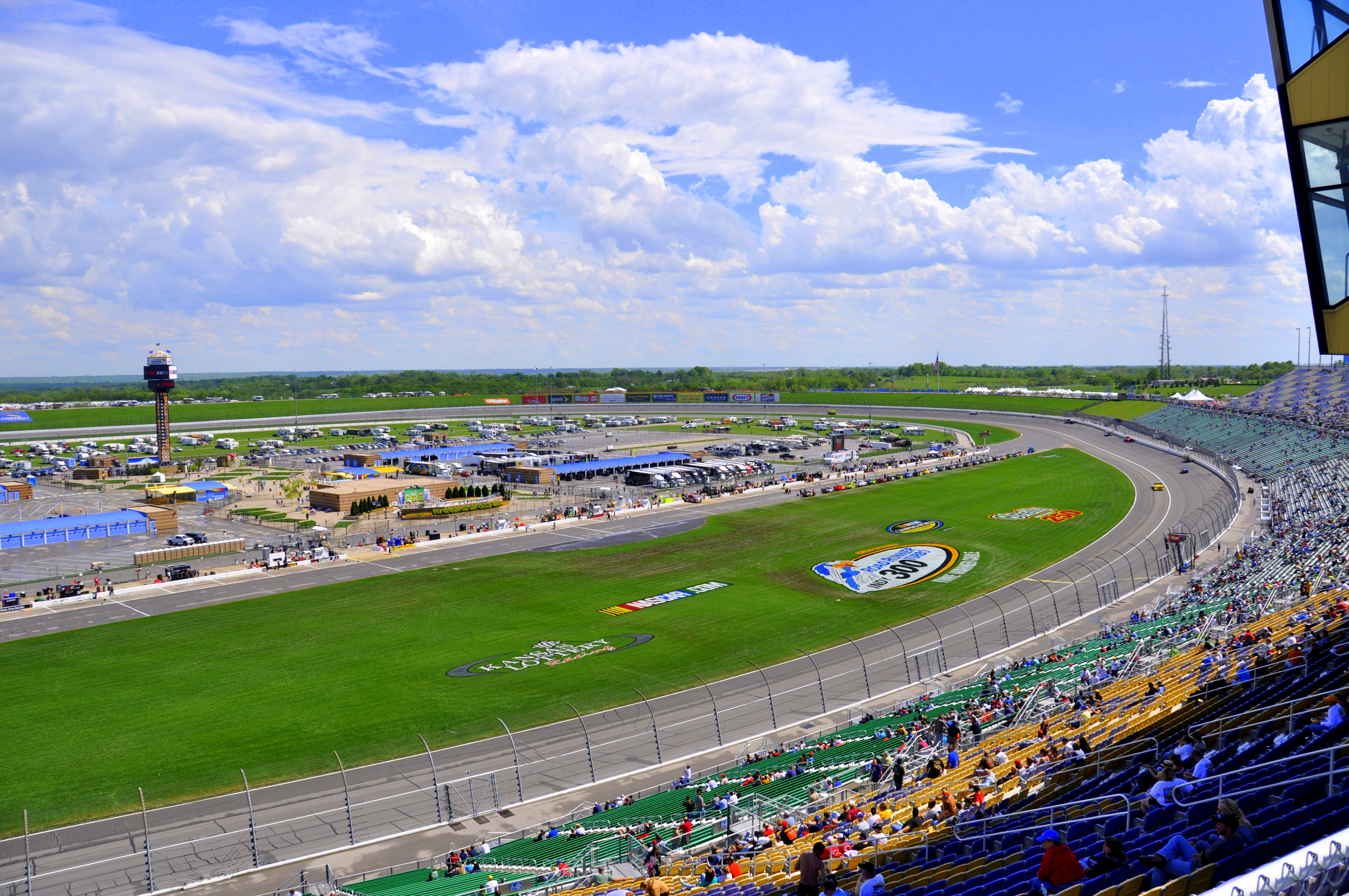
Kansas Speedway, the race track where the race was held.

Kansas Speedway is one of ten intermediate tracks to hold NASCAR races. The standard track at Kansas Speedway is a four-turn D-shaped oval track that is 1.5 miles (2.4 km) long. The track's turns are banked at fifteen degrees, while the front stretch, the location of the finish line, is 10.4 degrees. The back stretch, opposite of the front, is at only five degrees. The racetrack has seats for 82,000 spectators.

Before the race, Greg Biffle led the Drivers' Championship with 273 points, and Matt Kenseth stood in second with 254. Dale Earnhardt Jr. was third in the Drivers' Championship also with 254 points, one ahead of Martin Truex Jr. and five ahead of Kevin Harvick in fourth and fifth. Denny Hamlin with 242 was eight ahead of Tony Stewart, as Jimmie Johnson with 233 points, was eight ahead of Ryan Newman, and fourteen in front of Clint Bowyer. In the Manufacturers' Championship, Chevrolet was leading with 48 points, six ahead of Ford. Toyota, with 34 points, was 30 points ahead of Dodge in the battle for third. Brad Keselowski was the race's defending race winner after winning it in 2011.

=== Entry list ===
(R) - Denotes rookie driver.

(i) - Denotes driver who is ineligible for series driver points.

No.	Driver	Team	Manufacturer
1	Jamie McMurray	Earnhardt Ganassi Racing	Chevrolet
2	Brad Keselowski	Penske Racing	Dodge
5	Kasey Kahne	Hendrick Motorsports	Chevrolet
9	Marcos Ambrose	Richard Petty Motorsports	Ford
10	David Reutimann	Tommy Baldwin Racing	Chevrolet
11	Denny Hamlin	Joe Gibbs Racing	Toyota
12	Sam Hornish Jr. (i)	Penske Racing	Dodge
13	Casey Mears	Germain Racing	Ford
14	Tony Stewart	Stewart–Haas Racing	Chevrolet
15	Clint Bowyer	Michael Waltrip Racing	Toyota
16	Greg Biffle	Roush Fenway Racing	Ford
17	Matt Kenseth	Roush Fenway Racing	Ford
18	Kyle Busch	Joe Gibbs Racing	Toyota
19	Mike Bliss (i)	Humphrey Smith Racing	Toyota
20	Joey Logano	Joe Gibbs Racing	Toyota
22	A. J. Allmendinger	Penske Racing	Dodge
23	Scott Riggs	R3 Motorsports	Chevrolet
24	Jeff Gordon	Hendrick Motorsports	Chevrolet
26	Josh Wise (R)	Front Row Motorsports	Ford
27	Paul Menard	Richard Childress Racing	Chevrolet
29	Kevin Harvick	Richard Childress Racing	Chevrolet
30	David Stremme	Inception Motorsports	Toyota
31	Jeff Burton	Richard Childress Racing	Chevrolet
32	Reed Sorenson (i)	FAS Lane Racing	Ford
33	Jeff Green (i)	Circle Sport	Chevrolet
34	David Ragan	Front Row Motorsports	Ford
36	Dave Blaney	Tommy Baldwin Racing	Chevrolet
38	David Gilliland	Front Row Motorsports	Ford
39	Ryan Newman	Stewart–Haas Racing	Chevrolet
42	Juan Pablo Montoya	Earnhardt Ganassi Racing	Chevrolet
43	Aric Almirola	Richard Petty Motorsports	Ford
47	Bobby Labonte	JTG Daugherty Racing	Toyota
48	Jimmie Johnson	Hendrick Motorsports	Chevrolet
49	J. J. Yeley	Robinson-Blakeney Racing	Toyota
51	Kurt Busch	Phoenix Racing	Chevrolet
55	Mark Martin	Michael Waltrip Racing	Toyota
56	Martin Truex Jr.	Michael Waltrip Racing	Toyota
74	Tony Raines	Turn One Racing	Chevrolet
78	Regan Smith	Furniture Row Racing	Chevrolet
83	Landon Cassill	BK Racing	Toyota
87	Joe Nemechek (i)	NEMCO Motorsports	Toyota
88	Dale Earnhardt Jr.	Hendrick Motorsports	Chevrolet
93	Travis Kvapil	BK Racing	Toyota
98	Michael McDowell	Phil Parsons Racing	Ford
99	Carl Edwards	Roush Fenway Racing	Ford
Official entry list

== Practice and qualifying ==
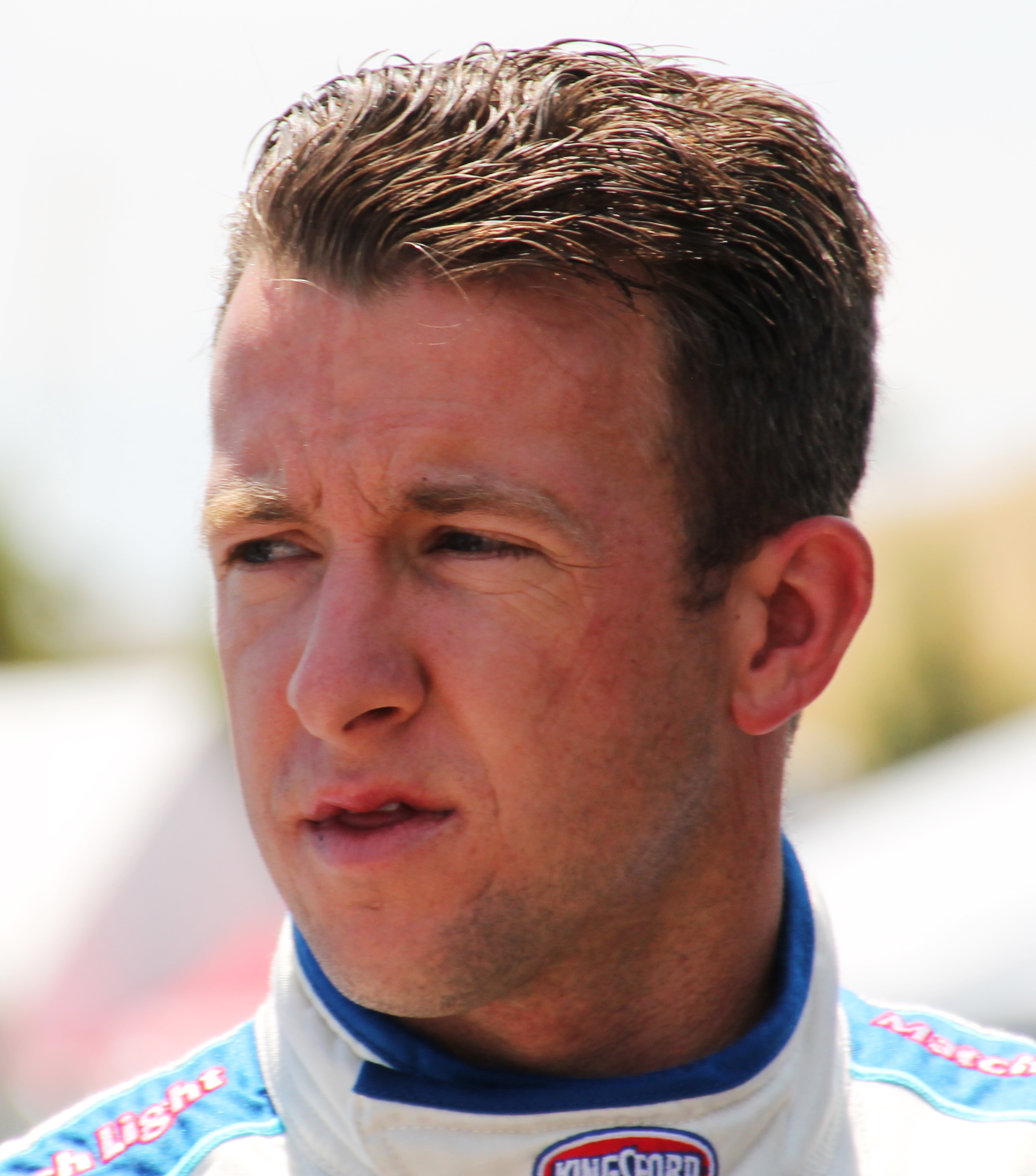
A. J. Allmendinger (pictured in 2015) won the pole position, after having the fastest time of 30.683 seconds.

Two practice sessions were held before the race on Friday. The first session lasted 80 minutes long, while the second was 90 minutes long. Kyle Busch was quickest with a time of 31.083 seconds in the first session, over one-tenth of a second faster than Carl Edwards. Kasey Kahne was third, followed by Landon Cassill, Earnhardt Jr., and Newman. Stewart was seventh, still within a second of Kyle Busch's time. In the second practice session, Johnson was fastest with a time of 30.865 seconds, only 0.113 seconds quicker than second-placed Mark Martin. Biffle took third place, ahead of Keselowski, Sam Hornish Jr. and Edwards. Jeff Burton managed to be seventh quickest.

Forty-six cars were entered for qualifying, but only forty-three can race because of NASCAR's qualifying procedure. A. J. Allmendinger clinched his second pole position during his career, with a time of 30.683 seconds. He was joined on the front row of the grid by Harvick. Joey Logano qualified third, Hamlin took fourth, and Martin started fifth. Truex Jr., Earnhardt Jr., Bowyer, Kahne, and Hornish Jr. rounded out the first ten positions. The three drivers who failed to qualify for the race were Tim Andrews, Jeff Green and Tony Raines, who had times of 31.820 and 31.846 seconds.

== Race ==
The race, the eighth in the season, started at 1:16 p.m. EDT and was televised live in the United States on Fox. The conditions on the grid were dry before the race and overcast skies are expected. Cole Cochran, of Kansas City Alliance Raceway Ministries, began pre-race ceremonies, by giving the invocation. Next, Jeremy Vitt performed the national anthem, and Victory Junction Gang Camp ambassadors gave the command for drivers to start their engines. During the pace laps, Logano had to move to the rear of the grid because of changing his engine.

== Results ==
=== Qualifying ===
Grid	No.	Driver	Team	Manufacturer	Time	Speed
1	22	A. J. Allmendinger	Penske Racing	Dodge	30.683	175.993
2	29	Kevin Harvick	Richard Childress Racing	Chevrolet	30.726	175.747
3	20^{2}	Joey Logano	Joe Gibbs Racing	Toyota	30.730	175.724
4	11	Denny Hamlin	Joe Gibbs Racing	Toyota	30.740	175.667
5	55	Mark Martin	Michael Waltrip Racing	Toyota	30.772	175.484
6	56	Martin Truex Jr.	Michael Waltrip Racing	Toyota	30.779	175.444
7	88	Dale Earnhardt Jr.	Hendrick Motorsports	Chevrolet	30.802	175.313
8	15	Clint Bowyer	Michael Waltrip Racing	Toyota	30.804	175.302
9	5	Kasey Kahne	Hendrick Motorsports	Chevrolet	30.841	175.092
10	12	Sam Hornish Jr.	Penske Racing	Dodge	30.842	175.086
11	2	Brad Keselowski	Penske Racing	Dodge	30.846	175.063
12	31	Jeff Burton	Richard Childress Racing	Chevrolet	30.870	174.927
13	39	Ryan Newman	Stewart–Haas Racing	Chevrolet	30.877	174.887
14	51	Kurt Busch	Phoenix Racing	Chevrolet	30.879	174.876
15	48	Jimmie Johnson	Hendrick Motorsports	Chevrolet	30.892	174.803
16	10	David Reutimann	Tommy Baldwin Racing	Chevrolet	30.892	174.803
17	16	Greg Biffle	Roush Fenway Racing	Ford	30.909	174.706
18	17	Matt Kenseth	Roush Fenway Racing	Ford	30.948	174.486
19	27	Paul Menard	Richard Childress Racing	Chevrolet	30.977	174.323
20	24	Jeff Gordon	Hendrick Motorsports	Chevrolet	30.988	174.261
21	99	Carl Edwards	Roush Fenway Racing	Ford	30.991	174.244
22	38	David Gilliland	Front Row Motorsports	Ford	31.004	174.171
23	14	Tony Stewart	Stewart–Haas Racing	Chevrolet	31.009	174.143
24	30	David Stremme	Inception Motorsports	Toyota	31.029	174.031
25	18	Kyle Busch	Joe Gibbs Racing	Toyota	31.031	174.020
26	43	Aric Almirola	Richard Petty Motorsports	Ford	31.034	174.003
27	34	David Ragan	Front Row Motorsports	Ford	31.044	173.947
28	9	Marcos Ambrose	Richard Petty Motorsports	Ford	31.059	173.863
29	78	Regan Smith	Furniture Row Racing	Chevrolet	31.078	173.756
30	47	Bobby Labonte	JTG Daugherty Racing	Toyota	31.080	173.745
31	49	J. J. Yeley	Robinson-Blakeney Racing	Toyota	31.121	173.516
32	83	Landon Cassill	BK Racing	Toyota	31.144	173.388
33	36	Dave Blaney	Tommy Baldwin Racing	Chevrolet	31.145	173.383
34	23	Scott Riggs	R3 Motorsports	Chevrolet	31.169	173.249
35	93	Travis Kvapil	BK Racing	Toyota	31.174	173.221
36	1	Jamie McMurray	Earnhardt Ganassi Racing	Chevrolet	31.181	173.182
37	98	Michael McDowell	Phil Parsons Racing	Ford	31.186	173.155
38	26	Josh Wise	Front Row Motorsports	Ford	31.258	172.756
39	42	Juan Pablo Montoya	Earnhardt Ganassi Racing	Chevrolet	31.303	172.507
40	13	Casey Mears	Germain Racing	Ford	31.398	171.986
41	87	Joe Nemechek	NEMCO Motorsports	Toyota	31.464	171.625
42	32^{1}	Reed Sorenson	FAS Lane Racing	Ford	31.754	170.057
43	19	Mike Bliss	Humphrey Smith Racing	Toyota	31.506	171.396
Failed to Qualify
	79	Tim Andrews	Go Green Racing	Ford	31.581	170.989
	33	Jeff Green	Joe Falk	Chevrolet	31.808	169.769
	74	Tony Raines	Turn One Racing	Chevrolet	31.869	169.444
^{1} :Qualified by owner points.^{2} :Logano will start last on the grid after changing an engine before qualifying.

=== Race results ===
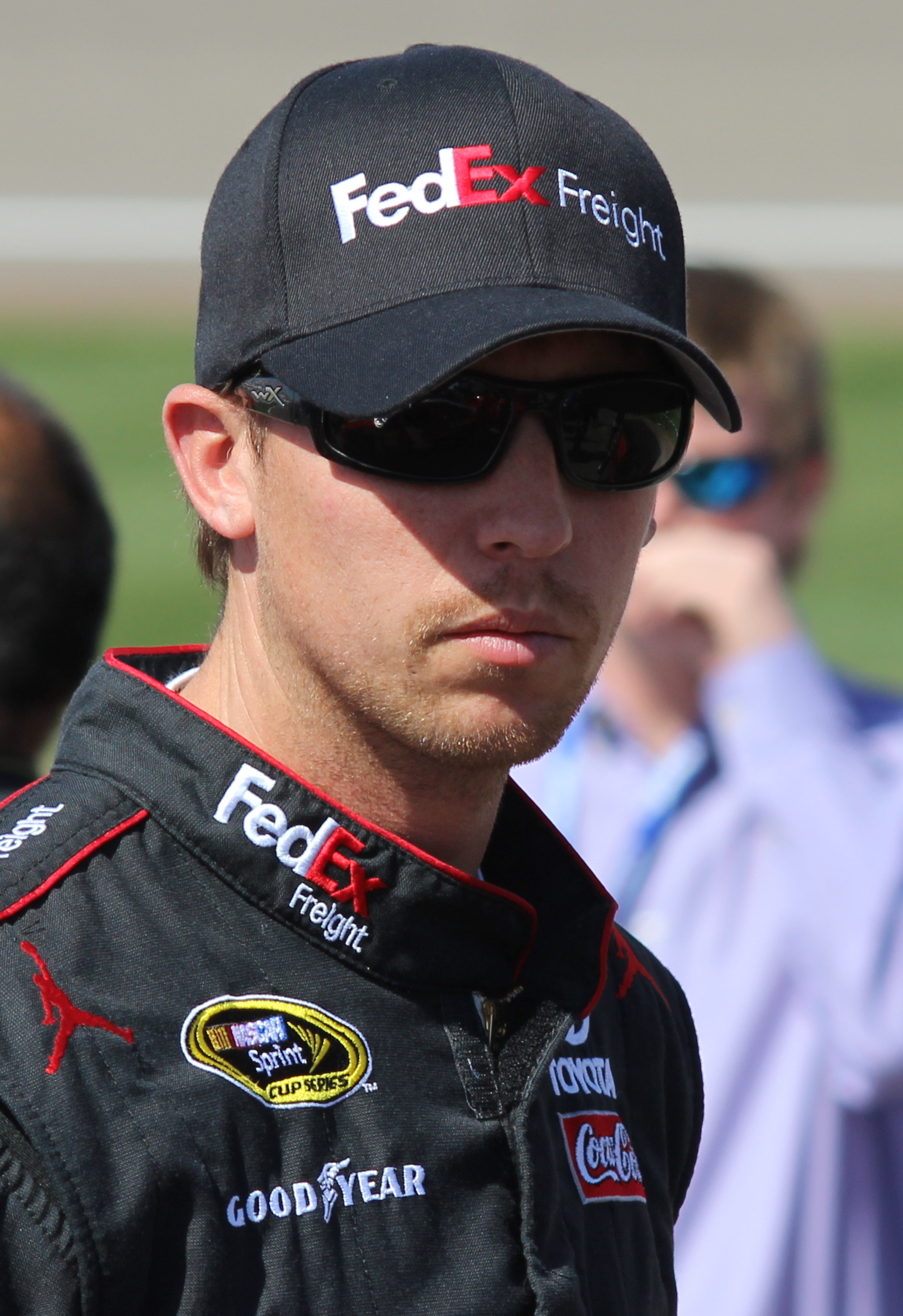
Denny Hamlin won the race.

Pos	Car	Driver	Team	Manufacturer	Laps Run	Points
1	11	Denny Hamlin	Joe Gibbs Racing	Toyota	267	47
2	56	Martin Truex Jr.	Michael Waltrip Racing	Toyota	267	44
3	48	Jimmie Johnson	Hendrick Motorsports	Chevrolet	267	42
4	17	Matt Kenseth	Roush Fenway Racing	Ford	267	41
5	16	Greg Biffle	Roush Fenway Racing	Ford	267	39
6	29	Kevin Harvick	Richard Childress Racing	Chevrolet	267	38
7	88	Dale Earnhardt Jr.	Hendrick Motorsports	Chevrolet	267	37
8	5	Kasey Kahne	Hendrick Motorsports	Chevrolet	267	36
9	99	Carl Edwards	Roush Fenway Racing	Ford	267	36
10	18	Kyle Busch	Joe Gibbs Racing	Toyota	267	34
11	2	Brad Keselowski	Penske Racing	Dodge	267	34
12	42	Juan Pablo Montoya	Earnhardt Ganassi Racing	Chevrolet	267	33
13	14	Tony Stewart	Stewart–Haas Racing	Chevrolet	267	31
14	1	Jamie McMurray	Earnhardt Ganassi Racing	Chevrolet	266	30
15	20	Joey Logano	Joe Gibbs Racing	Toyota	266	29
16	9	Marcos Ambrose	Richard Petty Motorsports	Ford	266	28
17	51	Kurt Busch	Phoenix Racing	Chevrolet	266	27
18	27	Paul Menard	Richard Childress Racing	Chevrolet	266	26
19	12	Sam Hornish Jr.	Penske Racing	Dodge	266	0
20	39	Ryan Newman	Stewart–Haas Racing	Chevrolet	265	24
21	24	Jeff Gordon	Hendrick Motorsports	Chevrolet	264	23
22	31	Jeff Burton	Richard Childress Racing	Chevrolet	264	22
23	43	Aric Almirola	Richard Petty Motorsports	Ford	264	21
24	78	Regan Smith	Furniture Row Racing	Chevrolet	263	20
25	93	Travis Kvapil	BK Racing	Toyota	263	19
26	13	Casey Mears	Germain Racing	Ford	263	18
27	38	David Gilliland	Front Row Motorsports	Ford	263	17
28	32	Reed Sorenson	FAS Lane Racing	Ford	263	0
29	10	David Reutimann	Tommy Baldwin Racing	Chevrolet	262	15
30	34	David Ragan	Front Row Motorsports	Ford	262	14
31	49	J. J. Yeley	Robinson-Blakeney Racing	Toyota	261	13
32	22	A. J. Allmendinger	Penske Racing	Dodge	257	13
33	55	Mark Martin	Michael Waltrip Racing	Toyota	255	11
34	83	Landon Cassill	BK Racing	Toyota	214	10
35	47	Bobby Labonte	JTG Daugherty Racing	Toyota	132	9
36	15	Clint Bowyer	Michael Waltrip Racing	Toyota	125	8
37	36	Dave Blaney	Tommy Baldwin Racing	Chevrolet	82	7
38	30	David Stremme	Inception Motorsports	Toyota	80	6
39	26	Josh Wise	Front Row Motorsports	Ford	65	5
40	98	Michael McDowell	Phil Parsons Racing	Ford	58	4
41	87	Joe Nemechek	NEMCO Motorsports	Toyota	47	0
42	19	Mike Bliss	Humphrey Smith Racing	Toyota	27	0
43	23	Scott Riggs	R3 Motorsports	Chevrolet	18	1

== Standings after the race ==
Drivers' Championship standings

Pos	Driver	Points
1	Greg Biffle	312
2	Martin Truex Jr.	297
3	Matt Kenseth	295
4	Dale Earnhardt Jr.	291
5	Denny Hamlin	289

Manufacturers' Championship standings

Pos	Manufacturer	Points
1	Chevrolet	54
2	Ford	46
3	Toyota	43
4	Dodge	30

- Note: Only the top five positions are included for the driver standings.

Previous race: 2012 Samsung Mobile 500	Sprint Cup Series; 2012 season	Next race: 2012 Capital City 400
