= 2012 Auto Club 400 =

Race details
- Race 5 of 36 in the 2012 NASCAR Sprint Cup Series
- Track map of the speedway at Auto Club Speedway AKA California Speedway
- Date: March 25, 2012
- Official name: Auto Club 400
- Location: Auto Club Speedway, Fontana, California
- Course: Permanent racing facility
- Course length: 2 miles (3.2 km)
- Distance: 129 laps, 258 mi (415.2 km)
- Scheduled distance: 200 laps, 400 mi (643.7 km)
- Weather: A few showers; wind out of the SSW at 9 mph.
- Average speed: 160.166 miles per hour (257.762 km/h)

Pole position
Driver	Denny Hamlin	Joe Gibbs Racing
- Time: 38.626

Most laps led
Driver	Kyle Busch	Joe Gibbs Racing
- Laps: 80

Winner
No. 14	Tony Stewart	Stewart Haas Racing

Television in the United States
- Network: Fox Broadcasting Company
- Announcers: Mike Joy, Darrell Waltrip and Larry McReynolds

The 2012 Auto Club 400 was a NASCAR Sprint Cup Series stock car race held on March 25 at Auto Club Speedway in Fontana, California. Shortened to 129 laps because of rain showers, it was the fifth race of the 2012 Sprint Cup Series season. The race was won by Tony Stewart for the Stewart–Haas Racing team. Kyle Busch finished second, and Dale Earnhardt Jr., who started fourteenth, clinched third.

== Report ==
=== Background ===
Auto Club Speedway (previously California Speedway) was a superspeedway located in Fontana, California which hosted NASCAR racing annually from 1997 to 2023. The standard track at Auto Club Speedway featured four turns and was 2 miles (3.2 km) long. The turns were banked at fourteen degrees, while the front stretch, the location of the finish line, was banked at eleven degrees. The back stretch had 3 degrees of banking. The racetrack had seats for 92,100 spectators.

Before the race, Greg Biffle was leading the Drivers' Championship with 157 points, nine points ahead of Kevin Harvick in second and twelve ahead of Matt Kenseth. Martin Truex Jr. followed fourth with 139 points, two ahead of Denny Hamlin and Dale Earnhardt Jr. in fifth and sixth. Tony Stewart, with 130, was in the seventh position ahead of Clint Bowyer and Joey Logano. Paul Menard rounded out the first ten positions with 123 points. In the Manufacturers' Championship, Ford was first with 25 points, one ahead of Chevrolet and four ahead of Toyota. Dodge was in the fourth positions with 18 points. Kevin Harvick was the race's defending winner from 2011.

=== Entry list ===
(R) - Denotes rookie driver.

(i) - Denotes driver who is ineligible for series driver points.

No.	Driver	Team	Manufacturer
1	Jamie McMurray	Earnhardt Ganassi Racing	Chevrolet
2	Brad Keselowski	Penske Racing	Dodge
5	Kasey Kahne	Hendrick Motorsports	Chevrolet
7	Robby Gordon	Robby Gordon Motorsports	Dodge
9	Marcos Ambrose	Richard Petty Motorsports	Ford
10	David Reutimann	Tommy Baldwin Racing	Chevrolet
11	Denny Hamlin	Joe Gibbs Racing	Toyota
13	Casey Mears	Germain Racing	Ford
14	Tony Stewart	Stewart–Haas Racing	Chevrolet
15	Clint Bowyer	Michael Waltrip Racing	Toyota
16	Greg Biffle	Roush Fenway Racing	Ford
17	Matt Kenseth	Roush Fenway Racing	Ford
18	Kyle Busch	Joe Gibbs Racing	Toyota
19	Mike Bliss (i)	Humphrey Smith Racing	Toyota
20	Joey Logano	Joe Gibbs Racing	Toyota
22	A. J. Allmendinger	Penske Racing	Dodge
23	Scott Riggs	R3 Motorsports	Chevrolet
24	Jeff Gordon	Hendrick Motorsports	Chevrolet
26	Josh Wise (R)	Front Row Motorsports	Ford
27	Paul Menard	Richard Childress Racing	Chevrolet
29	Kevin Harvick	Richard Childress Racing	Chevrolet
30	David Stremme	Inception Motorsports	Toyota
31	Jeff Burton	Richard Childress Racing	Chevrolet
32	Ken Schrader	FAS Lane Racing	Ford
33	Brendan Gaughan	Richard Childress Racing	Chevrolet
34	David Ragan	Front Row Motorsports	Ford
36	Dave Blaney	Tommy Baldwin Racing	Chevrolet
37	Timmy Hill (R)	Max Q Motorsports	Ford
38	David Gilliland	Front Row Motorsports	Ford
39	Ryan Newman	Stewart–Haas Racing	Chevrolet
42	Juan Pablo Montoya	Earnhardt Ganassi Racing	Chevrolet
43	Aric Almirola	Richard Petty Motorsports	Ford
47	Bobby Labonte	JTG Daugherty Racing	Toyota
48	Jimmie Johnson	Hendrick Motorsports	Chevrolet
49	J. J. Yeley	Robinson-Blakeney Racing	Toyota
51	Kurt Busch	Phoenix Racing	Chevrolet
55	Mark Martin	Michael Waltrip Racing	Toyota
56	Martin Truex Jr.	Michael Waltrip Racing	Toyota
74	Reed Sorenson (i)	Turn One Racing	Chevrolet
78	Regan Smith	Furniture Row Racing	Chevrolet
83	Landon Cassill	BK Racing	Toyota
87	Joe Nemechek (i)	NEMCO Motorsports	Toyota
88	Dale Earnhardt Jr.	Hendrick Motorsports	Chevrolet
93	Travis Kvapil	BK Racing	Toyota
98	Michael McDowell	Phil Parsons Racing	Ford
99	Carl Edwards	Roush Fenway Racing	Ford
Official entry list

== Practice and qualifying ==
Three practice sessions were held before the Sunday race—one on Friday and two on Saturday. The first session lasted 90 minutes. The Saturday morning session lasted 50 minutes, and the final practice session lasted 60 minutes. During the first practice session, Bowyer was quickest with a time of 38.896, ahead of Mark Martin and Kasey Kahne in second and third. Brad Keselowski followed in the fourth position, ahead of Hamlin in fifth.

During qualifying, forty-six cars were entered, but only forty-three were able to race because of NASCAR's qualifying procedure. Hamlin clinched is tenth career pole position, with a time of 38.626. After his qualifying run, Hamlin commented, "We're four weeks in, and we've had two good weeks and two bad weeks. There's light at the end of the tunnel. I feel like this weekend we've got a little bit more speed than we had in Vegas. We're getting better, and we've got some good stuff coming with our team. We're obviously heading in the right direction." He was joined on the front row of the grid by Kyle Busch. Martin qualified third, Biffle took fourth, and Kahne started fifth. The three drivers that did not qualify were Robby Gordon, Joe Nemechek and Timmy Hill.

Hamlin was quickest in the second practice session with a time of 38.706 seconds. Kenseth and Ryan Newman followed in second and third, ahead of Tony Stewart in the fourth position. Kevin Harvick was fifth, less than five-hundredths of a second quicker than Kyle Busch. Keselowski, Carl Edwards, Jimmie Johnson, and Kahne rounded out the first ten positions. During the third and final practice session, Hamlin, with a fastest time of 39.553, remained quickest. Jeff Gordon and Bowyer followed in second and third with times of 39.700 and 39.732 seconds. Jamie McMurray was fourth fastest, ahead of Kyle Busch and Johnson. Harvick, Kenseth, Martin Truex Jr., and Stewart completed the first ten positions during the session.

== Race ==
The race, the fifth in the season, began at 3:12 p.m. EDT and was televised live in the United States on Fox. The conditions on the grid were dry before the race while cloudy skies were expected. Jeff Hamilton, of Motor Racing Outreach, began pre-race ceremonies, by giving the invocation. Next, Night Ranger performed the national anthem, and the trio of Sean Hayes, Chris Diamantopoulos, Will Sass (from the film The Three Stooges) gave the command for drivers to start their engines.

Pole position winner, Hamlin maintained the lead throughout the first lap, but was overtaken by Kyle Busch on the following lap. As the weather became worse for racing conditions, many teams adjusted their cars during the first set of green flag pit stops. On the 85th lap, Stewart claimed the lead from Kyle Busch. Shortly after, Stewart moved back into the lead ahead of Hamlin and Kyle Busch after pitting.

The race ran 250 miles without incident, with the first caution on Lap 125 for rain. During pit stops, Stewart refused to pit, while Hamlin in the second position and a few others did. Also during the caution, Johnson, who had been in the top-ten for most of the race, began having problems with a potential oil leak, causing the smoke to run out of under the car. Afterward, the caution flag turned to a red flag, stalling the race because of the rain shower. Afterward, NASCAR decided the end the race, making Stewart the winner. Kyle Busch finished second, ahead of Dale Earnhardt Jr., Harvick and Edwards. Biffle, Ryan Newman, Martin Truex Jr., Kurt Busch, and Johnson rounded out the first ten positions.

It was the first time a NASCAR race in the premiership had gone without an incident-related safety car since the October 2002 Talladega race.

== Results ==
=== Qualifying ===
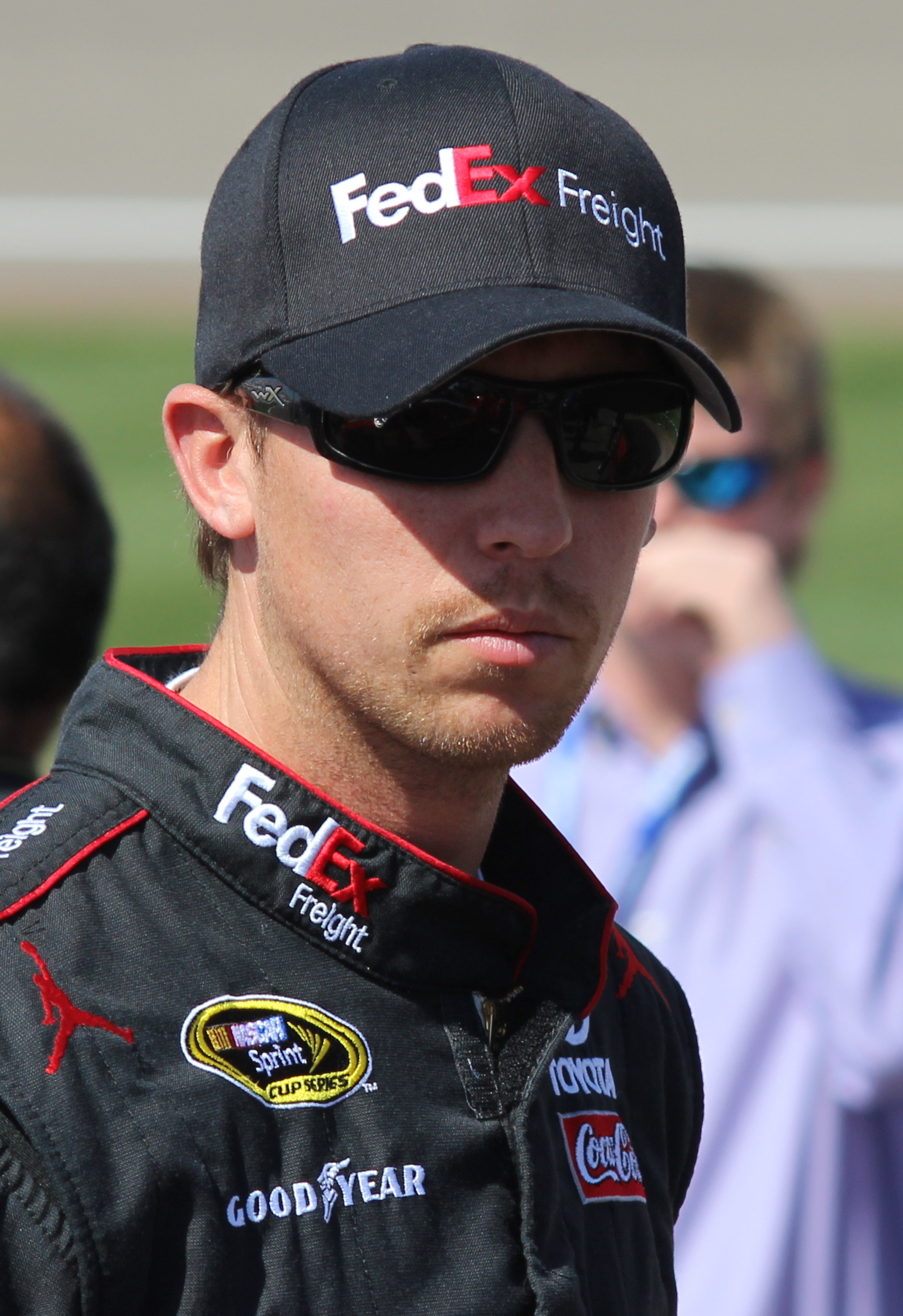
Denny Hamlin scored the pole position.

Grid	No.	Driver	Team	Manufacturer	Time	Speed
1	11	Denny Hamlin	Joe Gibbs Racing	Toyota	38.626	186.403
2	18	Kyle Busch	Joe Gibbs Racing	Toyota	38.807	185.534
3	55	Mark Martin	Michael Waltrip Racing	Toyota	38.807	185.534
4	16	Greg Biffle	Roush Fenway Racing	Ford	38.812	185.510
5	5	Kasey Kahne	Hendrick Motorsports	Chevrolet	38.812	185.510
6	39	Ryan Newman	Stewart–Haas Racing	Chevrolet	38.850	185.328
7	29	Kevin Harvick	Richard Childress Racing	Chevrolet	38.877	185.199
8	20	Joey Logano	Joe Gibbs Racing	Toyota	38.878	185.195
9	14	Tony Stewart	Stewart–Haas Racing	Chevrolet	38.880	185.185
10	48	Jimmie Johnson	Hendrick Motorsports	Chevrolet	38.893	185.123
11	15	Clint Bowyer	Michael Waltrip Racing	Toyota	38.908	185.052
12	99	Carl Edwards	Roush Fenway Racing	Ford	38.919	185.000
13	56	Martin Truex Jr.	Michael Waltrip Racing	Toyota	38.977	184.724
14	88	Dale Earnhardt Jr.	Hendrick Motorsports	Chevrolet	39.018	184.530
15	17	Matt Kenseth	Roush Fenway Racing	Ford	39.062	184.322
16	1	Jamie McMurray	Earnhardt Ganassi Racing	Chevrolet	39.116	184.068
17	2	Brad Keselowski	Penske Racing	Dodge	39.121	184.044
18	10	David Reutimann	Tommy Baldwin Racing	Chevrolet	39.149	183.913
19	31	Jeff Burton	Richard Childress Racing	Chevrolet	39.185	183.744
20	30	David Stremme	Inception Motorsports	Toyota	39.259	183.397
21	24	Jeff Gordon	Hendrick Motorsports	Chevrolet	39.263	183.379
22	78	Regan Smith	Furniture Row Racing	Chevrolet	39.333	183.052
23	51	Kurt Busch	Phoenix Racing	Chevrolet	39.413	182.681
24	42	Juan Pablo Montoya	Earnhardt Ganassi Racing	Chevrolet	39.439	182.560
25	22	A. J. Allmendinger	Penske Racing	Dodge	39.443	182.542
26	47	Bobby Labonte	JTG Daugherty Racing	Toyota	39.464	182.445
27	27	Paul Menard	Richard Childress Racing	Chevrolet	39.481	182.366
28	43	Aric Almirola	Richard Petty Motorsports	Ford	39.540	182.094
29	9	Marcos Ambrose	Richard Petty Motorsports	Ford	39.559	182.007
30	26	Josh Wise	Front Row Motorsports	Ford	39.760	181.087
31	83	Landon Cassill	BK Racing	Toyota	39.812	180.850
32	98	Michael McDowell	Phil Parsons Racing	Ford	39.865	180.610
33	13	Casey Mears	Germain Racing	Ford	39.880	180.542
34	36	Dave Blaney	Tommy Baldwin Racing	Chevrolet	39.904	180.433
35	23	Scott Riggs	R3 Motorsports	Chevrolet	39.921	180.356
36	49	J. J. Yeley	Robinson-Blakeney Racing	Toyota	39.934	180.297
37	33	Brendan Gaughan	Richard Childress Racing	Chevrolet	40.087	179.609
38	34	David Ragan	Front Row Motorsports	Ford	40.119	179.466
39	19	Mike Bliss	Humphrey Smith Motorsports	Toyota	40.157	179.296
40	74	Reed Sorenson	Turn One Racing	Chevrolet	40.194	179.131
41	93	Travis Kvapil	BK Racing	Toyota	40.254	178.864
42	38	David Gilliland	Front Row Motorsports	Ford	40.313	178.602
43	32	Ken Schrader	FAS Lane Racing	Ford	40.374	178.333
Failed to qualify
	7	Robby Gordon	Robby Gordon Motorsports	Dodge	40.343	178.470
	87	Joe Nemechek	NEMCO Motorsports	Toyota	40.349	178.443
	37	Timmy Hill	Rick Ware Racing	Ford	40.464	177.936

=== Race results ===
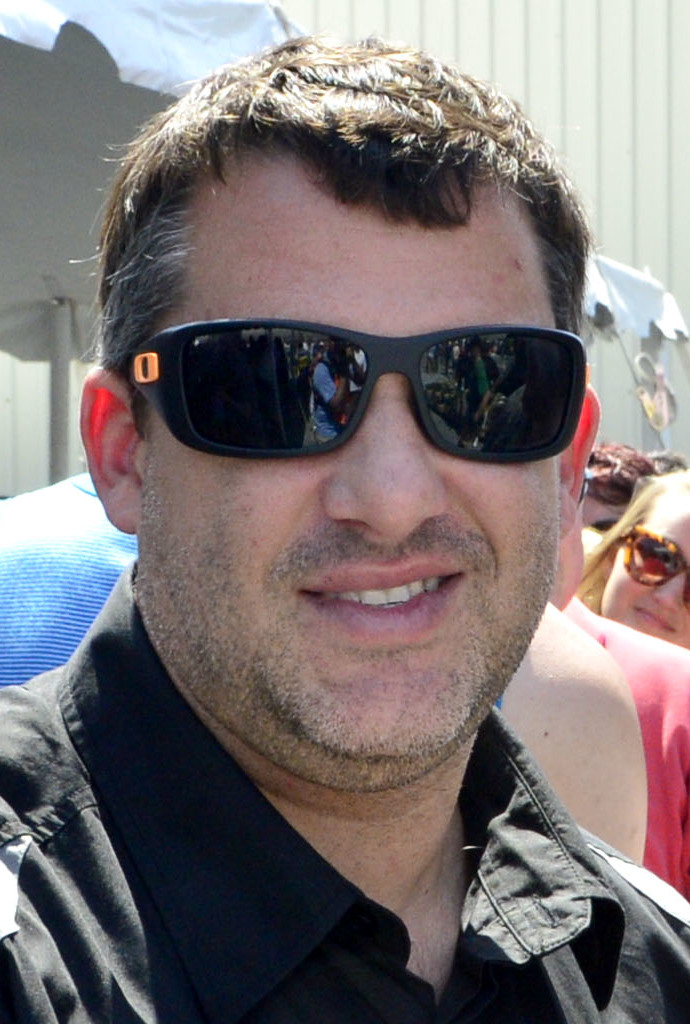
Tony Stewart was declared the winner after rain shortened the race to 129 laps.

Pos	Car	Driver	Team	Manufacturer	Laps	Points
1	14	Tony Stewart	Stewart–Haas Racing	Chevrolet	129	47
2	18	Kyle Busch	Joe Gibbs Racing	Toyota	129	44
3	88	Dale Earnhardt Jr.	Hendrick Motorsports	Chevrolet	129	41
4	29	Kevin Harvick	Richard Childress Racing	Chevrolet	129	40
5	99	Carl Edwards	Roush Fenway Racing	Ford	129	39
6	16	Greg Biffle	Roush Fenway Racing	Ford	129	38
7	39	Ryan Newman	Stewart–Haas Racing	Chevrolet	129	37
8	56	Martin Truex Jr.	Michael Waltrip Racing	Toyota	129	36
9	51	Kurt Busch	Phoenix Racing	Chevrolet	129	35
10	48	Jimmie Johnson	Hendrick Motorsports	Chevrolet	129	35
11	11	Denny Hamlin	Joe Gibbs Racing	Toyota	129	34
12	55	Mark Martin	Michael Waltrip Racing	Toyota	129	32
13	15	Clint Bowyer	Michael Waltrip Racing	Toyota	129	31
14	5	Kasey Kahne	Hendrick Motorsports	Chevrolet	129	30
15	22	A. J. Allmendinger	Penske Racing	Dodge	129	29
16	17	Matt Kenseth	Roush Fenway Racing	Ford	129	28
17	42	Juan Pablo Montoya	Earnhardt-Genassi Racing	Chevrolet	128	27
18	2	Brad Keselowski	Penske Racing	Dodge	128	26
19	27	Paul Menard	Richard Childress Racing	Chevrolet	128	25
20	78	Regan Smith	Furniture Row Racing	Chevrolet	128	24
21	9	Marcos Ambrose	Richard Petty Motorsports	Ford	128	23
22	31	Jeff Burton	Richard Childress Racing	Chevrolet	128	22
23	13	Casey Mears	Germain Racing	Ford	128	21
24	20	Joey Logano	Joe Gibbs Racing	Toyota	128	19
25	43	Aric Almirola	Richard Petty Motorsports	Ford	128	19
26	24	Jeff Gordon	Hendrick Motorsports	Chevrolet	128	19
27	10	David Reutimann	Tommy Baldwin Racing	Chevrolet	127	17
28	47	Bobby Labonte	JTG Daugherty Racing	Toyota	127	16
29	93	Travis Kvapil	BK Racing	Toyota	127	15
30	38	David Gilliland	Front Row Motorsports	Ford	127	14
31	34	David Ragan	Front Row Motorsports	Ford	127	13
32	1	Jamie McMurray	Earnhardt-Genassi Racing	Chevrolet	126	12
33	36	Dave Blaney	Tommy Baldwin Racing	Chevrolet	126	11
34	32	Ken Schrader	FAS Lane Racing	Ford	125	10
35	49	J. J. Yeley	Robinson-Blakeney Racing	Chevrolet	125	9
36	83	Landon Cassill	BK Racing	Toyota	124	8
37	26	Josh Wise	Front Row Motorsports	Ford	51	7
38	98	Michael McDowell	Phil Parsons Racing	Ford	40	6
39	30	David Stremme	Inception Motorsports	Chevrolet	36	5
40	19	Mike Bliss	Humphrey Smith Motorsports	Toyota	18	–
41	23	Scott Riggs	R3 Motorsports	Chevrolet	17	3
42	74	Reed Sorenson	Turn One Racing	Chevrolet	6	–
43	33	Brendan Gaughan	Richard Childress Racing	Chevrolet	1	1

== Standings after the race ==
Drivers' championship standings

Pos	Driver	Points
1	Greg Biffle	195
2	Kevin Harvick	188
3	Dale Earnhardt Jr.	178
4	Tony Stewart	177
5	Martin Truex Jr.	175

Manufacturers' championship standings

Pos	Manufacturer	Points
1		
2		
3		
4		

- Note: Only the top five positions are included for the driver standings.

Previous race: 2012 Food City 500	Sprint Cup Series; 2012 season	Next race: 2012 Goody's Fast Relief 500
