= 2012 Food City 500 =

Race details
- Race 4 of 36 in the 2012 NASCAR Sprint Cup Series
- 2012 Food City 500 program cover
- Date: March 18, 2012
- Location: Bristol Motor Speedway, Bristol, Tennessee
- Course: Permanent racing facility
- Course length: 0.533 miles (0.858 km)
- Distance: 500 laps, 266.5 mi (428.89 km)
- Weather: Temperatures up to 73.9 °F (23.3 °C); wind speeds up to 8.9 miles per hour (14.3 km/h)
- Average speed: 93.037 miles per hour (149.729 km/h)

Pole position
| Driver | Greg Biffle | Roush Fenway Racing |
- Time: 15.324

Most laps led
| Driver | Brad Keselowski | Penske Racing |
- Laps: 231

Winner
| No. 2 | Brad Keselowski | Penske Racing |

Television in the United States
- Network: Fox Broadcasting Company
- Announcers: Mike Joy, Darrell Waltrip, Larry McReynolds
- Nielsen ratings: 4.4/11 (Final); 4.0/10 (Overnight) (7.307 million)

The 2012 Food City 500 was the fourth stock car race of the 2012 NASCAR Sprint Cup Series. It was held on March 18, 2012 at Bristol Motor Speedway in Bristol, Tennessee before a crowd of 102,000. The 500-lap race was won by Brad Keselowski of the Penske Racing team after he started from fifth position. Matt Kenseth finished second and Martin Truex Jr. came in third.

Greg Biffle won the pole position and maintained into the first corner, as A. J. Allmendinger, who started in the second position of the grid, was passed by Jeff Gordon on the first lap. After a competition caution that started on lap 40, Allmendinger became the leader of the race. After the final pitstops, Keselowski took over the first position from Matt Kenseth. He maintained the first position to lead the most laps of 231, and to win his first race of the 2012 season. There were five cautions and thirteen lead changes among seven different drivers during the course of the race.

The race was Keselowski's first win of the season, and the fifth of his career. The result kept Biffle in the lead of the Drivers' Championship with 157 points, nine ahead of Kevin Harvick and twelve ahead of Kenseth. Ford took over the lead in the Manufacturers' Championship, and bumped Chevrolet to second place with 24 points. Toyota followed in third with 21 points, while Dodge remained in fourth with 18. The race attracted 7.307 million television viewers.

== Background ==
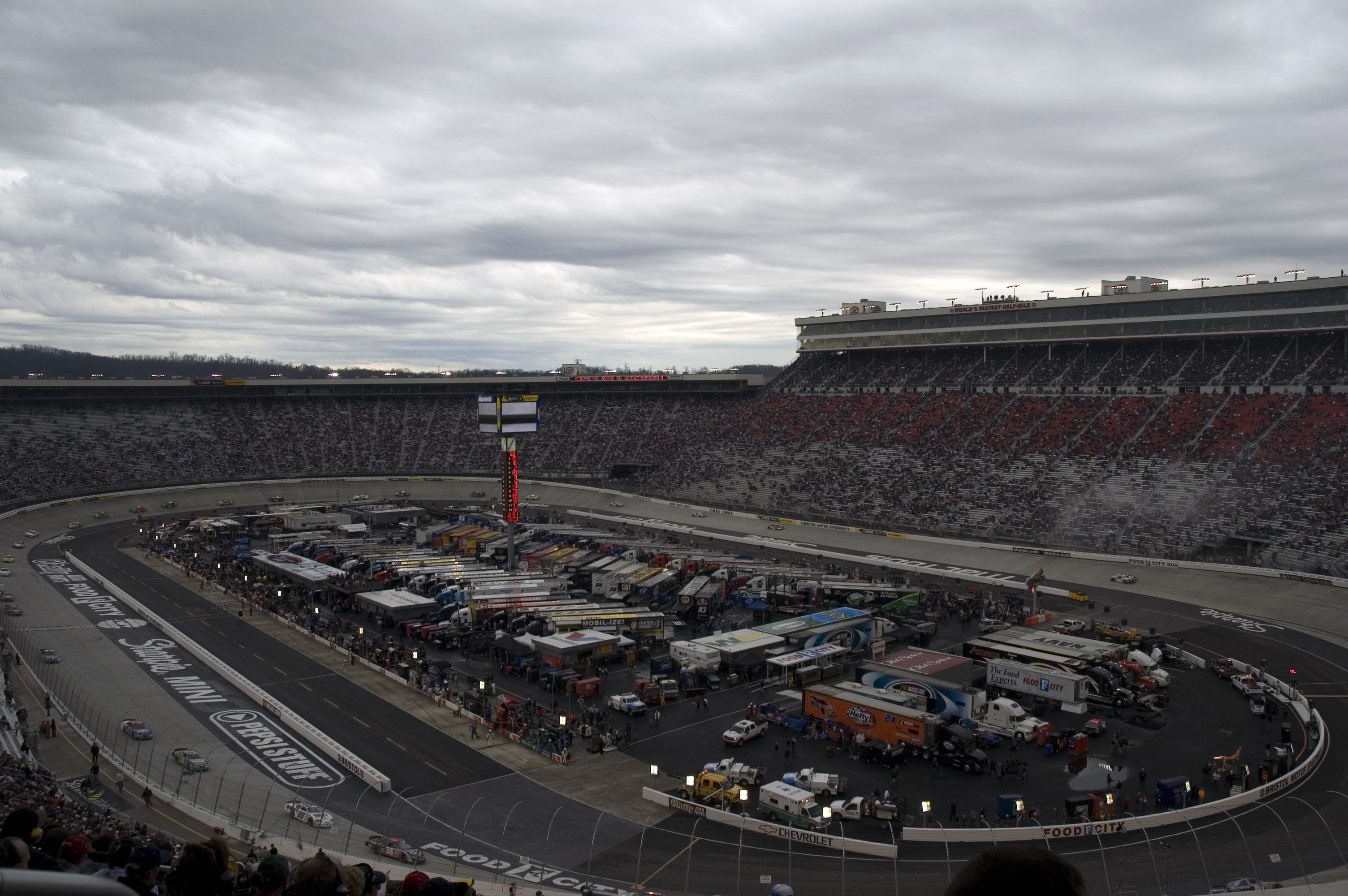
Bristol Motor Speedway, where the race was held.

The 2012 Food City 500 was the fourth of thirty-six scheduled stock car races of the 2012 NASCAR Sprint Cup Series. It took place on March 18, 2012, in Bristol, Tennessee, at Bristol Motor Speedway, a short track which holds NASCAR races. The standard track at Bristol Motor Speedway is a four-turn short track oval that is 0.533 miles (0.858 km) long. The track's turns are banked from twenty-four to thirty degrees, while the front stretch, the location of the finish line, is banked from six to ten degrees. The back stretch also has banking from six to ten degrees.

One team chose to replace their regular driver with a substitute. Michael Waltrip Racing chose to replace Mark Martin with Brian Vickers for six races during the season. Team owner Michael Waltrip said, "Brian Vickers is a veteran driver with almost 10 years experience, but he hasn't even turned 30 yet. He's shown he can win at this level and we have every confidence he'll run well with us."

Before the race, Greg Biffle led the Drivers' Championship with 125 points, followed by Kevin Harvick on 113. Denny Hamlin was third in the Drivers' Championship with 113 points, Dale Earnhardt Jr. was fourth with 107 points, and Matt Kenseth was in fifth with 102 points. In the Manufacturers' Championship, Chevrolet was leading with 21 points, four points ahead of their rivals Ford for second place. Toyota, with 17 points, was eight points ahead of their rivals Dodge in the battle for third. Kyle Busch was the race's defending champion.

=== Entry list ===
(R) - Denotes rookie driver.

(i) - Denotes driver who is ineligible for series driver points.

| No. | Driver | Team | Manufacturer |
|---|---|---|---|
| 1 | Jamie McMurray | Earnhardt Ganassi Racing | Chevrolet |
| 2 | Brad Keselowski | Penske Racing | Dodge |
| 5 | Kasey Kahne | Hendrick Motorsports | Chevrolet |
| 7 | Robby Gordon | Robby Gordon Motorsports | Dodge |
| 9 | Marcos Ambrose | Richard Petty Motorsports | Ford |
| 10 | David Reutimann | Tommy Baldwin Racing | Chevrolet |
| 11 | Denny Hamlin | Joe Gibbs Racing | Toyota |
| 13 | Casey Mears | Germain Racing | Ford |
| 14 | Tony Stewart | Stewart–Haas Racing | Chevrolet |
| 15 | Clint Bowyer | Michael Waltrip Racing | Toyota |
| 16 | Greg Biffle | Roush Fenway Racing | Ford |
| 17 | Matt Kenseth | Roush Fenway Racing | Ford |
| 18 | Kyle Busch | Joe Gibbs Racing | Toyota |
| 20 | Joey Logano | Joe Gibbs Racing | Toyota |
| 22 | A. J. Allmendinger | Penske Racing | Dodge |
| 23 | Scott Riggs | R3 Motorsports | Chevrolet |
| 24 | Jeff Gordon | Hendrick Motorsports | Chevrolet |
| 26 | Josh Wise (R) | Front Row Motorsports | Ford |
| 27 | Paul Menard | Richard Childress Racing | Chevrolet |
| 29 | Kevin Harvick | Richard Childress Racing | Chevrolet |
| 30 | David Stremme | Inception Motorsports | Toyota |
| 31 | Jeff Burton | Richard Childress Racing | Chevrolet |
| 32 | Ken Schrader | FAS Lane Racing | Ford |
| 33 | Brendan Gaughan | Richard Childress Racing | Chevrolet |
| 34 | David Ragan | Front Row Motorsports | Ford |
| 36 | Dave Blaney | Tommy Baldwin Racing | Chevrolet |
| 37 | Timmy Hill (R) | Max Q Motorsports | Ford |
| 38 | David Gilliland | Front Row Motorsports | Ford |
| 39 | Ryan Newman | Stewart–Haas Racing | Chevrolet |
| 42 | Juan Pablo Montoya | Earnhardt Ganassi Racing | Chevrolet |
| 43 | Aric Almirola | Richard Petty Motorsports | Ford |
| 47 | Bobby Labonte | JTG Daugherty Racing | Toyota |
| 48 | Jimmie Johnson | Hendrick Motorsports | Chevrolet |
| 49 | J. J. Yeley | Robinson-Blakeney Racing | Toyota |
| 51 | Kurt Busch | Phoenix Racing | Chevrolet |
| 55 | Brian Vickers | Michael Waltrip Racing | Toyota |
| 56 | Martin Truex Jr. | Michael Waltrip Racing | Toyota |
| 74 | Reed Sorenson (i) | Turn One Racing | Chevrolet |
| 78 | Regan Smith | Furniture Row Racing | Chevrolet |
| 83 | Landon Cassill | BK Racing | Toyota |
| 87 | Joe Nemechek (i) | NEMCO Motorsports | Toyota |
| 88 | Dale Earnhardt Jr. | Hendrick Motorsports | Chevrolet |
| 93 | Travis Kvapil | BK Racing | Toyota |
| 98 | Michael McDowell | Phil Parsons Racing | Ford |
| 99 | Carl Edwards | Roush Fenway Racing | Ford |
Official entry list

== Practice and qualifying ==
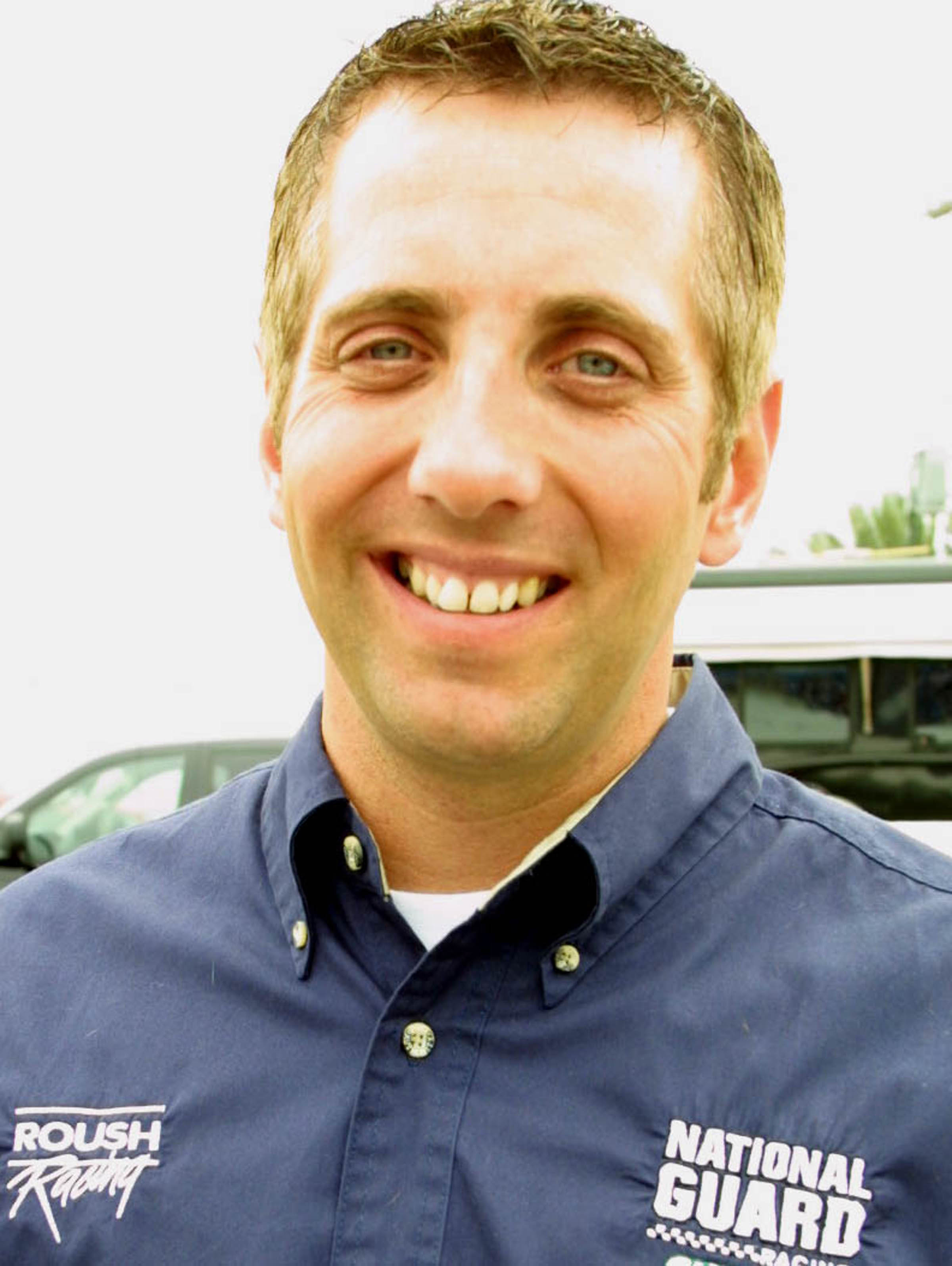
Greg Biffle won pole position with the fastest time, 15.324 seconds.

Three practice sessions were held before the Sunday race—one on Friday and two on Saturday. The first session lasted 90 minutes. The Saturday morning session lasted 45 minutes, and the final practice session lasted 60 minutes. During the first practice session, Carl Edwards was the fastest driver, placing ahead of A. J. Allmendinger in second and Marcos Ambrose in third. Joey Logano took fourth position and Ryan Newman placed fifth. Jeff Gordon, Regan Smith, Harvick, Martin Truex Jr. and Kyle Busch rounded out the top ten fastest drivers in the session.

Forty-six drivers entered the qualifier on Friday afternoon; due to NASCAR's qualifying procedure, forty-three were allowed to race. Each driver ran two laps, with the starting order determined by their fastest lap times. Biffle clinched his first pole position of the season, with a time of 15.324. He was joined on the grid's front row by Allemdinger. Newman qualified third, Jeff Gordon took fourth, and Keselowski started fifth. The driver that failed to qualify was Timmy Hill, and Robby Gordon withdrew because of issues with his car's engine. After the qualifier Biffle said, "I got in the gas fairly early [through Turns 1 and 2] and was a little worried about making the rest of the corner, It got loose up off of both ends because I went in the gas so early in the middle of the corner, just pushing the envelope as much as I could."

On Saturday morning, Allmendinger was fastest in the second practice session, ahead of Kyle Busch in second, and Newman in third. Biffle was fourth quickest, and Truex took fifth. Kahne managed sixth. Aric Almirola, Hamlin, Kenseth and Jeff Burton followed in the top ten. Jimmie Johnson spun during the session and Paul Menard hit the left-rear of Johnson, causing the Hendrick Motorsports driver to sustain light damage to his car. Later that day, Newman paced the final practice session, ahead of Kyle Busch in second and Reutimann in third. Keselowski was fourth fastest, ahead of Kahne and Ambrose. Clint Bowyer was seventh fastest, Truex eighth, Jeff Gordon ninth, and Johnson tenth. Towards the end of the session, Travis Kvapil hit the wall but avoided major damage to his car.

=== Qualifying results ===
| Grid | No. | Driver | Team | Manufacturer | Time | Speed |
|---|---|---|---|---|---|---|
| 1 | 16 | Greg Biffle | Roush Fenway Racing | Ford | 15.324 | 125.215 |
| 2 | 22 | A. J. Allmendinger | Penske Racing | Dodge | 15.325 | 125.207 |
| 3 | 39 | Ryan Newman | Stewart–Haas Racing | Chevrolet | 15.331 | 125.158 |
| 4 | 24 | Jeff Gordon | Hendrick Motorsports | Chevrolet | 15.340 | 125.085 |
| 5 | 2 | Brad Keselowski | Penske Racing | Dodge | 15.367 | 124.865 |
| 6 | 78 | Regan Smith | Furniture Row Racing | Chevrolet | 15.373 | 124.816 |
| 7 | 43 | Aric Almirola | Richard Petty Motorsports | Ford | 15.385 | 124.719 |
| 8 | 99 | Carl Edwards | Roush Fenway Racing | Ford | 15.389 | 124.687 |
| 9 | 20 | Joey Logano | Joe Gibbs Racing | Toyota | 15.392 | 124.662 |
| 10 | 5 | Kasey Kahne | Hendrick Motorsports | Chevrolet | 15.430 | 124.355 |
| 11 | 27 | Paul Menard | Richard Childress Racing | Chevrolet | 15.432 | 124.339 |
| 12 | 9 | Marcos Ambrose | Richard Petty Motorsports | Ford | 15.433 | 124.331 |
| 13 | 18 | Kyle Busch | Joe Gibbs Racing | Toyota | 15.425 | 124.178 |
| 14 | 29 | Kevin Harvick | Richard Childress Racing | Chevrolet | 15.461 | 124.106 |
| 15 | 56 | Martin Truex Jr. | Michael Waltrip Racing | Toyota | 15.461 | 124.106 |
| 16 | 15 | Clint Bowyer | Michael Waltrip Racing | Toyota | 15.474 | 124.002 |
| 17 | 1 | Jamie McMurray | Earnhardt Ganassi Racing | Chevrolet | 15.480 | 123.953 |
| 18 | 10 | David Reutimann | Tommy Baldwin Racing | Chevrolet | 15.491 | 123.866 |
| 19 | 88 | Dale Earnhardt Jr. | Hendrick Motorsports | Chevrolet | 15.491 | 123.866 |
| 20 | 11 | Denny Hamlin | Joe Gibbs Racing | Toyota | 15.495 | 123.834 |
| 21 | 17 | Matt Kenseth | Roush Fenway Racing | Ford | 15.516 | 123.666 |
| 22 | 48 | Jimmie Johnson | Hendrick Motorsports | Chevrolet | 15.532 | 123.538 |
| 23 | 14 | Tony Stewart | Stewart–Haas Racing | Chevrolet | 15.541 | 123.467 |
| 24 | 13 | Casey Mears | Germain Racing | Ford | 15.547 | 123.419 |
| 25 | 55 | Brian Vickers | Michael Waltrip Racing | Toyota | 15.547 | 123.419 |
| 26 | 38 | David Gilliland | Front Row Motorsports | Ford | 15.566 | 123.269 |
| 27 | 51 | Kurt Busch | Phoenix Racing | Chevrolet | 15.577 | 123.182 |
| 28 | 30 | David Stremme | Inception Motorsports | Toyota | 15.589 | 123.087 |
| 29 | 83 | Landon Cassill | BK Racing | Toyota | 15.594 | 123.047 |
| 30 | 42 | Juan Pablo Montoya | Earnhardt Ganassi Racing | Chevrolet | 15.601 | 122.992 |
| 31 | 34 | David Ragan | Front Row Motorsports | Ford | 15.604 | 122.968 |
| 32 | 33 | Brendan Gaughan | Richard Childress Racing | Chevrolet | 15.617 | 122.866 |
| 33 | 31 | Jeff Burton | Richard Childress Racing | Chevrolet | 15.628 | 122.780 |
| 34 | 93 | Travis Kvapil | BK Racing | Toyota | 15.638 | 122.701 |
| 35 | 36 | Dave Blaney | Tommy Baldwin Racing | Chevrolet | 15.646 | 122.638 |
| 36 | 47 | Bobby Labonte | JTG Daugherty Racing | Toyota | 15.648 | 122.623 |
| 37 | 26 | Josh Wise | Front Row Motorsports | Ford | 15.679 | 122.380 |
| 38 | 74 | Reed Sorenson | Turn One Racing | Chevrolet | 15.691 | 122.287 |
| 39 | 98 | Michael McDowell | Phil Parsons Racing | Ford | 15.732 | 121.968 |
| 40 | 49 | J. J. Yeley | Robinson-Blakeney Racing | Toyota | 15.750 | 121.829 |
| 41 | 87 | Joe Nemechek | NEMCO Motorsports | Toyota | 15.765 | 121.713 |
| 42 | 23 | Scott Riggs | R3 Motorsports | Chevrolet | 15.809 | 121.374 |
| 43 | 32 | Ken Schrader | FAS Lane Racing | Ford | 15.907 | 120.626 |
Did not qualify
| 44 | 37 | Timmy Hill | Rick Ware Racing/Max Q Motorsports | Ford | 15.953 | 120.278 |
| WD^{1} | 7 | Robby Gordon | Robby Gordon Motorsports | Dodge | – | – |
| WD | 40 | Tony Raines | Joe Falk/Mike Hillman | Toyota | – | – |
^{1} #7 team had to withdraw before Qualifying because of electrical issues with the engine.

== Race ==
The race began at 1:00 p.m. EST and was televised live in the United States on Fox. Around the start of the race, weather conditions were overcast; an 80% chance of rain was also forecast, although some rain had fallen on the morning of the race. Mike Rife of the Vansant Church of Christ began pre-race ceremonies by giving the invocation. The McGhee Tyson Air National Guard Base H4 Quartest performed the national anthem, and a group of Food City store managers gave the command for drivers to start their engines. NASCAR announced a competition caution would take place on lap 50.

Greg Biffle maintained the pole position lead into the first corner. Behind him, Jeff Gordon passed A. J. Allmendinger for second place. Ten laps later, Allmendinger passed Gordon to take the second position. By lap 14, Biffle had built up a 1.4-second lead. Four laps later, Ryan Newman moved up third after passing Gordon. The first caution came out on lap 24 for a multi-car crash on the front stretch that collected Kasey Kahne, Kevin Harvick, Marcos Ambrose, Carl Edwards, and Kyle Busch. Pit road was open on lap 40, taking the place of the competition caution. This allowed most of the leaders to make pit stops. Allmendinger took the lead during pit spots and held it on the lap 47 restart.

By lap 55, Allmendinger had a one-second lead over Truex. One lap later, Brian Vickers passed Truex for second. Allmendinger built his lead up to 1.4 seconds by lap 63. Twenty-two laps later, Truex passed Vickers to reclaim the second position. Vickers passed Truex on lap 92 to move back into that spot. Three laps later, Allmendinger, who was stuck behind Bobby Labonte, was passed by Vickers for the lead. On lap 104, Gordon moved up to third. Five laps later, Vickers maintained a half-second lead over Allmendinger. The third caution came on lap 116 when Ken Schrader hit the wall in turns 3 and 4. Under caution, all of the leaders opted to pit.

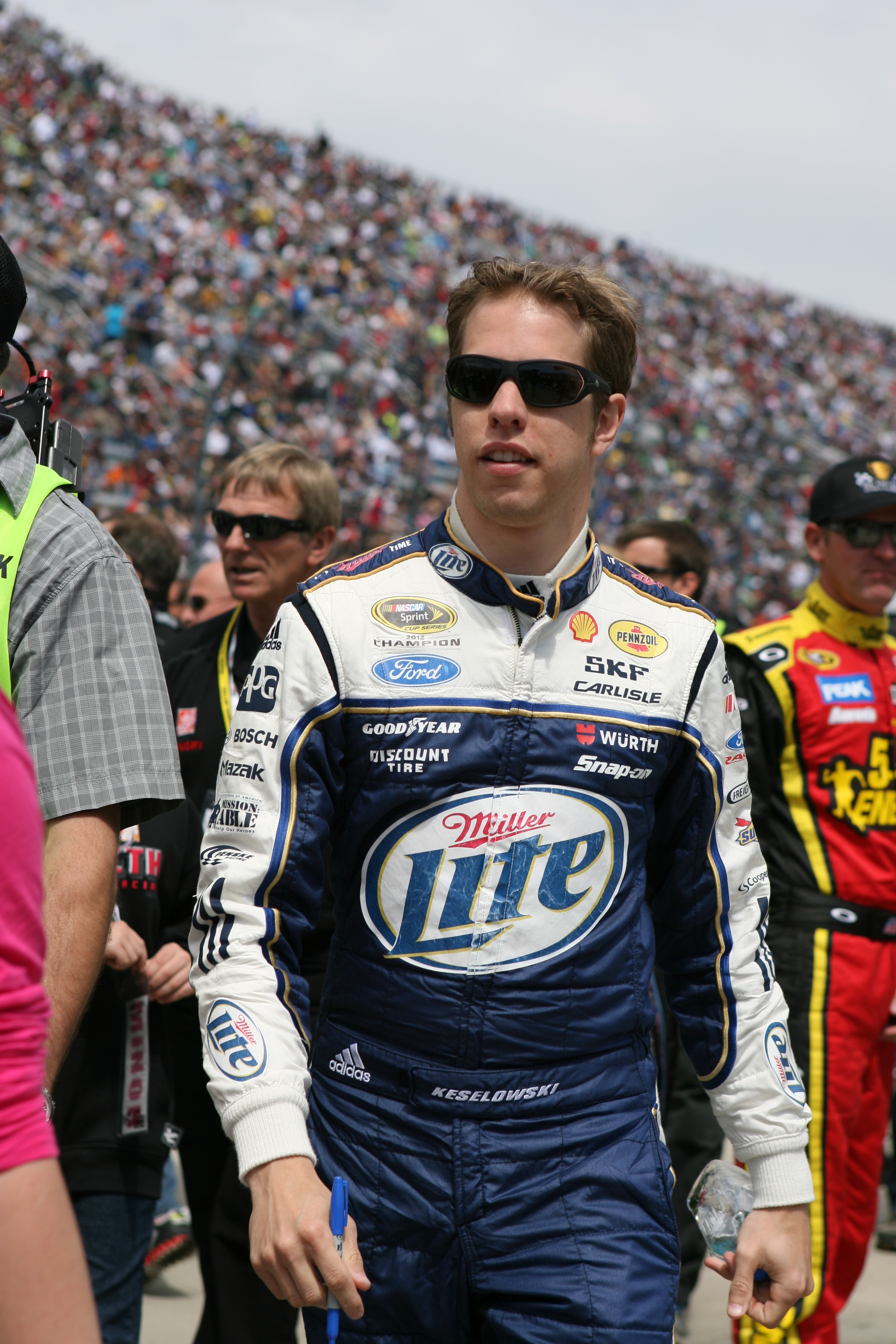
Brad Keselowski won the race, after leading the most laps with 231.

Vickers maintained the lead at the restart, ahead of Allmendinger and Gordon. By lap 130, Vickers now had a 1.6-second lead over Allmendinger. On lap 134, Keselowski had passed Allmendinger and Gordon for second. By lap 147, Keselowski had reduced Vickers' lead to 1.5-seconds. Eight laps later, Kahne returned to the race after the lap 24 crash. By lap 168, Vickers' lead was one second from Keselowski. After starting nineteenth, Dale Earnhardt Jr. had moved up fourteen positions to fifth by lap 179. Two laps later, Allmendinger started suffering from an vibration in his car. On lap 217, Keselowski passed Vickers for the lead. Eleven laps later, Gordon passed Vickers for second. On lap 235, Allmendinger made a pit stop to allow his team to check his car.

Green flag pit stops began on lap 242 and Menard was the first to pit under green. Thirteen laps later, Matt Kenseth passed Keselowski to claim the lead. When green flag pit stops were over, Keselowski reclaimed the lead. On lap 340, the third caution waved when David Stremme made contact with the wall. During the caution, all of the leaders made pit stops. Keselowski led the field back up to speed at the restart. On lap 348, Kenseth took the lead from Keselowski. Eleven laps later, the fourth caution came out when Gordon and Earnhardt made contact on the backstretch, causing Gordon to suffer a flat left rear tire and spin sideways. None of the leaders made pit stops during the caution.

The race restarted on lap 371. Fourteen laps later, Keselowski retook the lead after passing Kenseth. By lap 415, he had built up a half second lead over Kenseth. Twenty-nine laps later, Earnhardt was told by his team to conserve fuel. On lap 468, Truex moved into fifth place. Ten laps later, the fifth and final caution waved when Tony Stewart made contact with the wall. During the caution, none of the leaders again opted to pit. Keselowski led at the restart, ahead of Kenseth and Vickers. During the final laps, he managed to maintain his lead to win the race. Kenseth finished second, ahead of Truex in third, Clint Bowyer in fourth, and Vickers in fifth, rounding out the Top 5.

=== Post-race ===
"I told my crew before the race that this was the best car I ever had in [Sprint] Cup, and it showed. I just say what I think is real. It’s not about being cocky.”

— Keselowski, speaking after the race.

Keselowski appeared in victory lane to celebrate his first win of the season in front of 102,000 people who attended the race. Keselowski also earned $186,770 in race winnings. Afterward, he said, "This car here, this brand-new car that Penske Racing built – everybody back at the shop did a phenomenal job. The last few races have been really good, and I knew we had a shot at winning one if we closed the deal. Matt didn't make it easy." Kenseth, who finished second, said, "I was thinking I could run outside of him [after the restart], but he would roll through there so fast you could never get a run on him. I think he liked the bottom of [Turns] 1 and 2, but I could never get around on the bottom of [Turns] 1 and 2, so that was the right thing to do, to start on the top and leave me on the bottom – for him."

Truex was happy with his team's performance, "I'm so proud of the team – all the guys on the team and everybody at MWR. Clint (Bowyer) and Brian (Vickers) were up front all day long. This just says a lot about everything that everybody at MWR has done over the off season – working hard, giving us good race cars. We got off in the mid-part of the race, but had the race strategy at the end and a fast enough car to stay up there.” Earnhardt regretted colliding with teammate Jeff Gordon, “I’m mad because I screwed myself on pit road speeding. I’m pretty upset about that. Otherwise, I feel bad about running into Jeff’s car. I had a good day other than that. I had a good time. ... I feel bad about what happened with Jeff, but damn, we were just racing."

The race result left Biffle leading the Drivers' Championship with 157 points. Harvick, who finished eleventh, was second on 148, three ahead of Kenseth and nine in front of Truex Hamlin dropped to fifth with 137 points. In the Manufacturers' Championship, Ford took over the lead with 25 points, Chevrolet, who were bumped to second, were on 24. Toyota remained third on 21, three points ahead of Dodge in fourth. 7.307 million people watched the race on television. The race took two hours, fifty-one minutes and fifty-two seconds to complete, and the margin of victory was 0.714 seconds.

=== Race results ===
| Pos | No. | Driver | Team | Manufacturer | Laps | Led | Points |
|---|---|---|---|---|---|---|---|
| 1 | 2 | Brad Keselowski | Penske Racing | Dodge | 500 | 232 | 48^{2}^{3} |
| 2 | 17 | Matt Kenseth | [Roush Fenway Racing | Ford | 500 | 45 | 43^{1} |
| 3 | 56 | Martin Truex Jr. | Michael Waltrip Racing | Toyota | 500 | 0 | 41 |
| 4 | 15 | Clint Bowyer | Michael Waltrip Racing | Toyota | 500 | 0 | 40 |
| 5 | 55 | Brian Vickers | Michael Waltrip Racing | Toyota | 500 | 125 | 40^{1} |
| 6 | 31 | Jeff Burton | Richard Childress Racing | Chevrolet | 500 | 0 | 38 |
| 7 | 1 | Jamie McMurray | Earnhardt Ganassi Racing | Chevrolet | 500 | 0 | 37 |
| 8 | 42 | Juan Pablo Montoya | Earnhardt Ganassi Racing | Chevrolet | 500 | 0 | 36 |
| 9 | 48 | Jimmie Johnson | Hendrick Motorsports | Chevrolet | 500 | 0 | 35 |
| 10 | 27 | Paul Menard | Richard Childress Racing | Chevrolet | 500 | 0 | 34 |
| 11 | 29 | Kevin Harvick | Richard Childress Racing | Chevrolet | 500 | 0 | 33 |
| 12 | 39 | Ryan Newman | Stewart–Haas Racing | Chevrolet | 500 | 0 | 32 |
| 13 | 16 | Greg Biffle | Roush Fenway Racing | Ford | 500 | 41 | 32^{1} |
| 14 | 14 | Tony Stewart | Stewart–Haas Racing | Chevrolet | 500 | 0 | 30 |
| 15 | 88 | Dale Earnhardt Jr. | Hendrick Motorsports | Chevrolet | 500 | 2 | 30^{1} |
| 16 | 20 | Joey Logano | Joe Gibbs Racing | Toyota | 498 | 0 | 28 |
| 17 | 22 | A. J. Allmendinger | Penske Racing | Dodge | 498 | 54 | 28^{1} |
| 18 | 51 | Kurt Busch | Phoenix Racing | Chevrolet | 498 | 0 | 26 |
| 19 | 43 | Aric Almirola | Richard Petty Motorsports | Ford | 498 | 0 | 25 |
| 20 | 11 | Denny Hamlin | Joe Gibbs Racing | Toyota | 498 | 0 | 24 |
| 21 | 10 | David Reutimann | Tommy Baldwin Racing | Chevrolet | 497 | 0 | 23 |
| 22 | 33 | Brendan Gaughan | Richard Childress Racing | Chevrolet | 496 | 0 | 22 |
| 23 | 34 | David Ragan | Front Row Motorsports | Ford | 496 | 0 | 21 |
| 24 | 78 | Regan Smith | Furniture Row Racing | Chevrolet | 496 | 0 | 20 |
| 25 | 13 | Casey Mears | Germain Racing | Ford | 496 | 0 | 19 |
| 26 | 38 | David Gilliland | Front Row Motorsports | Ford | 496 | 0 | 18 |
| 27 | 93 | Travis Kvapil | BK Racing | Toyota | 496 | 0 | 17 |
| 28 | 47 | Bobby Labonte | JTG Daugherty Racing | Toyota | 495 | 0 | 16 |
| 29 | 83 | Landon Cassill | BK Racing | Toyota | 495 | 0 | 15 |
| 30 | 49 | J. J. Yeley | Robinson-Blakeney Racing | Toyota | 493 | 0 | 14 |
| 31 | 98 | Michael McDowell | Phil Parsons Racing | Ford | 492 | 0 | 13 |
| 32 | 18 | Kyle Busch | Joe Gibbs Racing | Toyota | 423 | 0 | 12 |
| 33 | 32 | Ken Schrader | FAS Lane Racing | Ford | 420 | 0 | 11 |
| 34 | 36 | Dave Blaney | Tommy Baldwin Racing | Chevrolet | 417 | 0 | 10 |
| 35 | 24 | Jeff Gordon | Hendrick Motorsports | Chevrolet | 395 | 1 | 10^{1} |
| 36 | 9 | Marcos Ambrose | Richard Petty Motorsports | Ford | 389 | 0 | 8 |
| 37 | 5 | Kasey Kahne | Hendrick Motorsports | Chevrolet | 366 | 0 | 7 |
| 38 | 30 | David Stremme | Inception Motorsports | Toyota | 334 | 0 | 6 |
| 39 | 99 | Carl Edwards | Roush Fenway Racing | Ford | 245 | 0 | 5 |
| 40 | 87 | Joe Nemechek | NEMCO Motorsports | Toyota | 57 | 0 | – |
| 41 | 23 | Scott Riggs | R3 Motorsports | Chevrolet | 26 | 0 | 3 |
| 42 | 74 | Reed Sorenson | Turn One Racing | Chevrolet | 17 | 0 | –^{4} |
| 43 | 26 | Josh Wise | Front Row Motorsports | Ford | 16 | 0 | 1 |
^{1} Includes one bonus point for leading a lap^{2} Includes two bonus points for leading the most laps ^{3} Includes three bonus points for winning the race ^{4} Ineligible for championship points

== Standings after the race ==
Drivers' Championship standings

| Pos | Driver | Wins | Points |
|---|---|---|---|
| 1 | Greg Biffle | 0 | 157 |
| 2 | Kevin Harvick | 0 | 148 |
| 3 | Matt Kenseth | 1 | 145 |
| 4 | Martin Truex Jr. | 0 | 139 |
| 5 | Denny Hamlin | 1 | 137 |

Manufacturers' Championship standings

| Pos | Manufacturer | Wins | Points |
|---|---|---|---|
| 1 | Ford | 1 | 25 |
| 2 | Chevrolet | 1 | 24 |
| 3 | Toyota | 1 | 21 |
| 4 | Dodge | 1 | 18 |

- Note: Only the top five positions are included for the driver standings.

| Previous race: 2012 Kobalt Tools 400 | Sprint Cup Series; 2012 season | Next race: 2012 Auto Club 400 |
