= 2012 Quaker State 400 =

Race details
- Race 17 of 36 in the 2012 NASCAR Sprint Cup Series
- The 2012 Quaker State 400 program cover, featuring Kyle Busch.
- Date: June 30, 2012
- Official name: Quaker State 400
- Location: Kentucky Speedway in Sparta, Kentucky
- Course: Permanent racing facility
- Course length: 1.5 miles (2.4 km)
- Distance: 267 laps, 400.5 mi (644.542 km)
- Weather: 88 degrees Fahrenheit Wind NW 10 mph Partly Cloudy skies

Pole position
Driver	Jimmie Johnson	Hendrick Motorsports
- Time: 29.700 seconds

Most laps led
Driver	Kyle Busch	Joe Gibbs Racing
- Laps: 116

Winner
No. 2	Brad Keselowski	Penske Racing

Television in the United States
- Network: TNT
- Announcers: Larry McReynolds, Wally Dallenbach Jr. and Kyle Petty

The race logo for the 2012 Quaker State 400.

The 2012 Quaker State 400 was a NASCAR Sprint Cup Series race that was held on June 30, 2012, at Kentucky Speedway in Sparta, Kentucky. Contested over 267 laps, it was the 17th race of the 2012 NASCAR Sprint Cup Series season. Brad Keselowski won the race, his third of the season. Kasey Kahne finished second and Denny Hamlin was third.

== Report ==
=== Background ===
Kentucky Speedway, the race track where the race will be held.

Kentucky Speedway, is one of ten intermediate tracks to hold NASCAR races. The standard track at Kentucky Speedway is a four-turn tri-oval track that is 1.5 miles (2.4 km) long. The track's turns are banked at 14 degrees, while the front stretch, the location of the finish line, is 8 degrees. The back stretch, opposite of the front, is at only 4 degrees. The racetrack has seats for 107,000 spectators. The defending winner of the event is Kyle Busch, who won it in 2011. The inaugural race was plagued by a massive traffic problem where many of the fans who expected to attend the race were turned away after several hours on Interstate 71. Following the problem, Kentucky Speedway announced that they bought more land for parking and began to work with the state government to improve traffic around the speedway in time for the 2012 race.

=== Race ===
The race, the 17th of the 2012 NASCAR Sprint Cup Series season began at 7:48 EDT. The race was televised live in the United States on TNT. Jimmie Johnson started on pole position. The Kentucky Army National Guard and the Boone County Sheriff's Office presented the flag. The invocation was offered by Pastor John Roberts of Raceway Ministries. Laura Bell Bundy performed the national anthem. The grand marshal was Quaker State Official Steve Reindl.

== Results ==
=== Qualifying ===
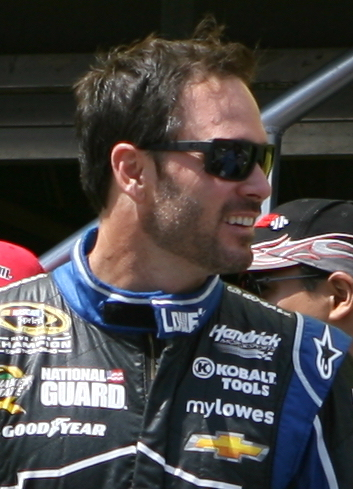
Jimmie Johnson scored the pole position.

Grid	No.	Driver	Team	Manufacturer	Time	Speed
1	48	Jimmie Johnson	Hendrick Motorsports	Chevrolet	29.700	181.818
2	18	Kyle Busch	Joe Gibbs Racing	Toyota	29.765	181.421
3	11	Denny Hamlin	Joe Gibbs Racing	Toyota	29.810	181.147
4	29	Kevin Harvick	Richard Childress Racing	Chevrolet	29.939	180.367
5	39	Ryan Newman	Stewart–Haas Racing	Chevrolet	29.944	180.337
6	15	Clint Bowyer	Michael Waltrip Racing	Toyota	29.962	180.228
7	88	Dale Earnhardt Jr.	Hendrick Motorsports	Chevrolet	29.963	180.222
8	2	Brad Keselowski	Penske Racing	Dodge	29.966	180.204
9	24	Jeff Gordon	Hendrick Motorsports	Chevrolet	29.994	180.036
10	56	Martin Truex Jr.	Michael Waltrip Racing	Toyota	30.006	179.964
11	16	Greg Biffle	Roush Fenway Racing	Ford	30.041	179.754
12	9	Marcos Ambrose	Richard Petty Motorsports	Ford	30.082	179.509
13	43	Aric Almirola	Richard Petty Motorsports	Ford	30.111	179.336
14	51	Kurt Busch	Phoenix Racing	Chevrolet	30.133	179.206
15	27	Paul Menard	Richard Childress Racing	Chevrolet	30.155	179.075
16	22	A. J. Allmendinger	Penske Racing	Dodge	30.160	179.045
17	1	Jamie McMurray	Earnhardt Ganassi Racing	Chevrolet	30.169	178.992
18	20	Joey Logano	Joe Gibbs Racing	Toyota	30.190	178.867
19	5	Kasey Kahne	Hendrick Motorsports	Chevrolet	30.212	178.737
20	17	Matt Kenseth	Roush Fenway Racing	Ford	30.298	178.230
21	13	Casey Mears	Germain Racing	Ford	30.367	177.825
22	14	Tony Stewart	Stewart–Haas Racing	Chevrolet	30.371	177.801
23	83	Landon Cassill	BK Racing	Toyota	30.505	177.020
24	95	Scott Speed	Leavine Family Racing	Ford	30.594	176.505
25	99	Carl Edwards	Roush Fenway Racing	Ford	30.644	176.217
26	78	Regan Smith	Furniture Row Racing	Chevrolet	30.687	175.970
27	87	Joe Nemechek	NEMCO Motorsports	Toyota	30.729	175.730
28	47	Bobby Labonte	JTG Daugherty Racing	Toyota	30.749	175.615
29	31	Jeff Burton	Richard Childress Racing	Chevrolet	30.820	175.211
30	26	Josh Wise	Front Row Motorsports	Ford	30.843	175.080
31	42	Juan Pablo Montoya	Earnhardt Ganassi Racing	Chevrolet	30.846	175.063
32	30	David Stremme	Inception Motorsports	Toyota	30.900	174.757
33	34	David Ragan	Front Row Motorsports	Ford	30.911	174.695
34	93	Travis Kvapil	BK Racing	Toyota	30.963	174.402
35	98	Michael McDowell	Phil Parsons Racing	Ford	30.963	174.402
36	23	Scott Riggs	R3 Motorsports	Chevrolet	30.973	174.345
37	19	Mike Bliss	Humphrey Smith Racing	Toyota	30.986	174.272
38	10	David Reutimann	Tommy Baldwin Racing	Chevrolet	31.122	173.511
39	55	Michael Waltrip	Michael Waltrip Racing	Toyota	31.359	172.199
40	38	David Gilliland	Front Row Motorsports	Ford	31.658	170.573
41	32	Ken Schrader	FAS Lane Racing	Ford	32.041	168.534
42	36	Dave Blaney	Tommy Baldwin Racing	Chevrolet	0.000	0.000
43	33	Stephen Leicht	Circle Sport Racing	Chevrolet	31.190	173.132
	Failed to Qualify					
44	49	J. J. Yeley	Robinson-Blakeney Racing	Toyota	31.284	172.612
45	52	Mike Skinner	Hamilton Means Racing	Toyota	31.418	171.876

=== Race results ===
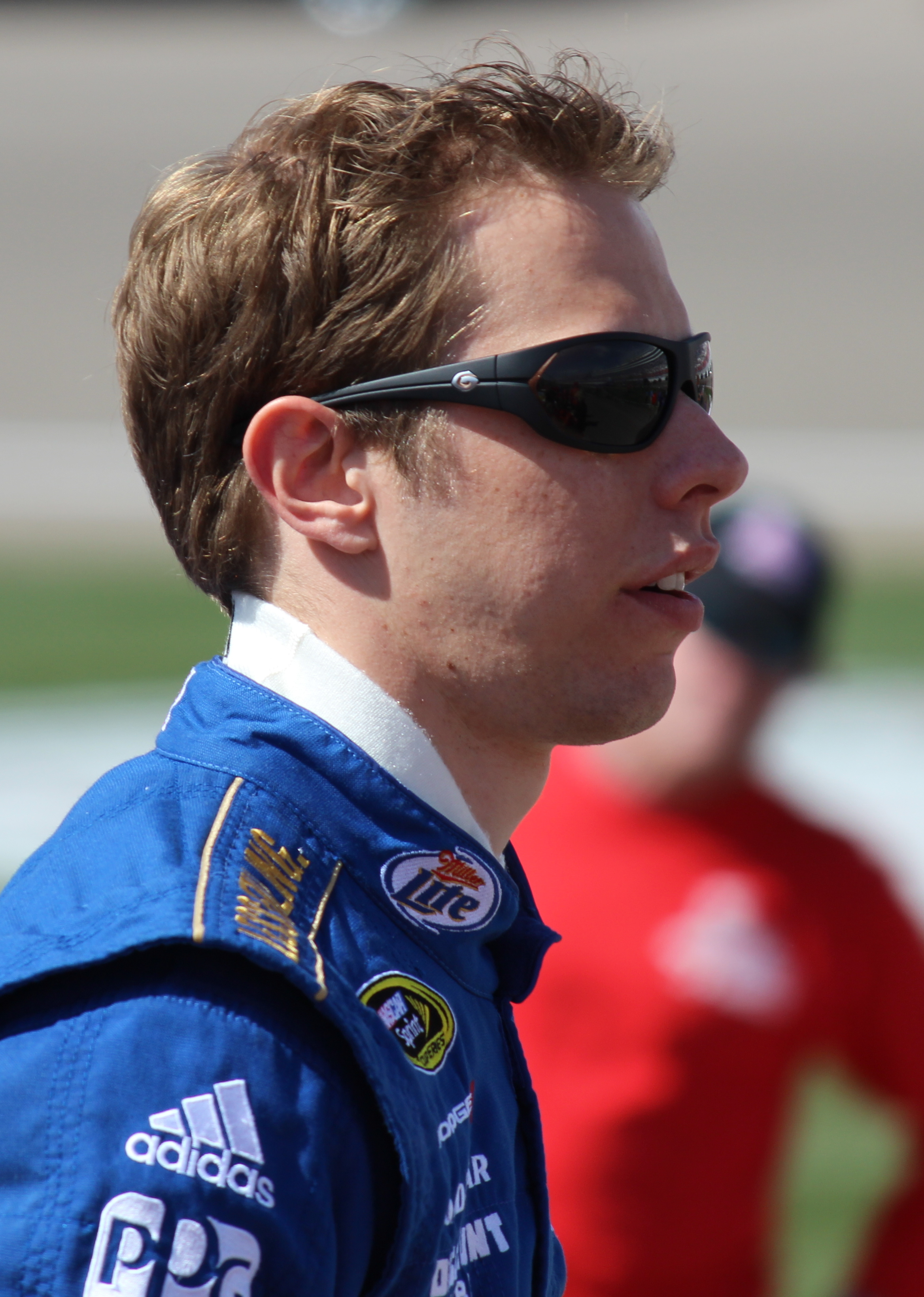
Brad Keselowski won the race.

Pos	Car	Driver	Team	Manufacturer	Laps Run	Points
1	2	Brad Keselowski	Penske Racing	Dodge	267	47
2	5	Kasey Kahne	Hendrick Motorsports	Chevrolet	267	42
3	11	Denny Hamlin	Joe Gibbs Racing	Toyota	267	42
4	88	Dale Earnhardt Jr.	Hendrick Motorsports	Chevrolet	267	40
5	24	Jeff Gordon	Hendrick Motorsports	Chevrolet	267	39
6	48	Jimmie Johnson	Hendrick Motorsports	Chevrolet	267	39
7	17	Matt Kenseth	Roush Fenway Racing	Ford	267	37
8	56	Martin Truex Jr.	Michael Waltrip Racing	Toyota	267	36
9	22	A. J. Allmendinger	Penske Racing	Dodge	267	35
10	18	Kyle Busch	Joe Gibbs Racing	Toyota	267	36
11	29	Kevin Harvick	Richard Childress Racing	Chevrolet	267	33
12	27	Paul Menard	Richard Childress Racing	Chevrolet	267	32
13	9	Marcos Ambrose	Richard Petty Motorsports	Ford	267	31
14	42	Juan Pablo Montoya	Earnhardt Ganassi Racing	Chevrolet	267	30
15	1	Jamie McMurray	Earnhardt Ganassi Racing	Chevrolet	267	29
16	15	Clint Bowyer	Michael Waltrip Racing	Toyota	267	28
17	93	Travis Kvapil	BK Racing	Toyota	267	28
18	13	Casey Mears	Germain Racing	Ford	267	27
19	51	Kurt Busch	Phoenix Racing	Chevrolet	267	25
20	99	Carl Edwards	Roush-Fenway Racing	Ford	266	24
21	16	Greg Biffle	Roush-Fenway Racing	Ford	266	23
22	20	Joey Logano	Joe Gibbs Racing	Toyota	266	22
23	10	David Reutimann	Tommy Baldwin Racing	Chevrolet	266	21
24	31	Jeff Burton	Richard Childress Racing	Chevrolet	266	20
25	83	Landon Cassill	BK Racing	Toyota	266	19
26	43	Aric Almirola	Richard Petty Motorsports	Ford	266	18
27	47	Bobby Labonte	JTG Daugherty Racing	Toyota	265	17
28	38	David Gilliland	Front Row Motorsports	Ford	265	16
29	34	David Ragan	Front Row Motorsports	Ford	263	15
30	55	Michael Waltrip	Michael Waltrip Racing	Toyota	262	14
31	32	Ken Schrader	FAS Lane Racing	Ford	262	13
32	14	Tony Stewart	Stewart–Haas Racing	Chevrolet	231	12
33	78	Regan Smith	Furniture Row Racing	Chevrolet	209	11
34	39	Ryan Newman	Stewart–Haas Racing	Chevrolet	208	10
35	36	Dave Blaney	Tommy Baldwin Racing	Chevrolet	114	9
36	30	David Stremme	Inception Motorsports	Toyota	71	8
37	26	Josh Wise	Front Row Motorsports	Ford	60	7
38	98	Michael McDowell	Phil Parsons Racing	Ford	58	6
39	95	Scott Speed	Leavine Family Racing	Ford	55	5
40	87	Joe Nemechek	NEMCO Motorsports	Toyota	52	0
41	33	Stephen Leicht	Circle Sport	Chevrolet	47	3
42	19	Mike Bliss	Tri-Star Motorsports	Toyota	18	0
43	23	Scott Riggs	R3 Motorsports	Chevrolet	12	1

== Standings after the race ==
Drivers' Championship standings

Pos	Driver	Points
1	Matt Kenseth	633
2	Dale Earnhardt Jr.	622
3	Jimmie Johnson	610
4	Greg Biffle	608
5	Denny Hamlin	565

Manufacturers' Championship standings

Pos	Manufacturer	Points
1	Chevrolet	177
2	Toyota	100
3	Ford	84
4	Dodge	73

- Note: Only the top five positions are included for the driver standings.

Previous race: 2012 Toyota/Save Mart 350	Sprint Cup Series; 2012 season	Next race: 2012 Coke Zero 400
