= R3 Motorsports =

Former NASCAR team

- Owner(s): Robert Richardson Sr. Robert Richardson Jr.
- Series: Sprint Cup Series; Nationwide Series; Camping World Truck Series; ARCA Re/Max Series
- Race drivers: Robert Richardson Jr.
- Manufacturer: Chevrolet; Dodge; Toyota

Career
- Races competed: 24
- Drivers' Championships: 0
- Race victories: 0
- Pole positions: 0

R3 Motorsports (formerly Richardson Motorsports) was an American professional stock car racing team that last competed in the NASCAR Sprint Cup Series, Nationwide Series, Camping World Truck Series and ARCA Re/Max Series. The team commonly fielded No. 23 North Texas Pipe Chevrolet Impala driven by Robert Richardson, Jr. part-time in the Nationwide Series. The team shut down in 2015 and sold their equipment to Rick Ware Racing.

== History ==
R3 Motorsports began running the ARCA RE/MAX Series in 2005 as Richardson Racing. It fielded the No. 33 in the first two races of the season with Richardson Jr., with a fourteenth-place finish at Nashville Superspeedway. The team changed its name to R3 Motorsports and started their entry into NASCAR's top series.

=== Craftsman Truck Series ===
==== Truck No. 1 history ====
In 2005, R3 ran one race in the Craftsman Truck Series at Phoenix with Richardson, Jr. finishing thirty-fourth in the No. 35 Chevrolet Silverado after wrecking.

At the end of the season, the team bought the equipment and owners points from Ultra Motorsports and changed to the No. 1 running full-time in 2006. With WinYourMortage.com sponsoring, the team qualified for twenty races and had two top-twenty finishes, but shut down their Truck team at the end of the season due to lack of sponsorship. They did attempt three Busch Series races in the No. 80 McKinley Pipe/Kinky Friedman Chevy, but did not qualify for either race.

==== Truck No. 1 results ====
Year	Driver	No.	Make	1	2	3	4	5	6	7	8	9	10	11	12	13	14	15	16	17	18	19	20	21	22	23	24	25	Owners	Pts
2005	Robert Richardson Jr.	35	Chevy	DAY	CAL	ATL	MAR	GTY	MFD	CLT	DOV	TEX	MCH	MLW	KAN	KEN	MEM	IRP	NSH	BRI	RCH	NHA	LVS	MAR	ATL	TEX	PHO	HOM; 34	64th	61
2006	Robert Richardson Jr.	1	Dodge	DAY; 17	CAL; 33	ATL; 30	MAR; 28			MFD; 33																			33rd	1774
2006	Robert Richardson Jr.	1	Chevy					GTY; 36	CLT; DNQ		DOV; DNQ	TEX; 23	MCH; DNQ	MLW; 33	KAN; 27	KEN; DNQ	MEM; 36	IRP; 30	NSH; 27	BRI; 36	NHA; 36	LVS; 28	TAL; 16	MAR; 24	ATL; 27	TEX; 28	PHO; 34	HOM; DNQ	33rd	1774

=== Nationwide Series ===
==== Car Nos. 03 and 50 history ====
In 2011, the team entered a second car, No. 03, at Las Vegas for Charles Lewandoski due to the short field of 42 cars. Alex Kennedy drove the No. 03 at Fontana. Scott Riggs drove at Michigan and Kentucky. Scott Wimmer drove at Road America. All races in 2011 have been start and parks to help fund the No. 23, the team's main car.

Also in 2011 a third R3 car the No. 50 car attempted one race at Watkins Glen. Driver Brian Simo got a DNQ.

==== Car No. 03 results ====
Year	Driver	No.	Make	1	2	3	4	5	6	7	8	9	10	11	12	13	14	15	16	17	18	19	20	21	22	23	24	25	26	27	28	29	30	31	32	33	34	35	Owners	Pts
2009	Kevin Conway	26	Chevy	DAY	CAL	LVS	BRI	TEX	NSH	PHO	TAL	RCH	DAR	CLT	DOV	NSH	KEN	MLW	NHA	DAY	CHI	GTY	IRP	IOW	GLN	MCH	BRI	CGV	ATL	RCH	DOV	KAN; 24	CAL	CLT; 24	MEM; 27	TEX; 20	PHO; 24	HOM; 22	28th	2861
2011	Charles Lewandoski	03	Dodge	DAY	PHO	LVS; 40																																	50th	72
2011	Chris Lawson	03	Dodge				BRI; DNQ																																50th	72
2011	Alex Kennedy	03	Dodge					CAL; 40	TEX	TAL	NSH	RCH	DAR	DOV	IOW	CLT	CHI																						50th	72
2011	Scott Riggs	03	Chevy															MCH; 37										BRI; 37	ATL; 38	RCH; 41	CHI; 36		KAN; 36	CLT; 39	TEX; 27	PHO	HOM; 37		50th	72
2011	Scott Riggs	03	Dodge																		KEN; 36	NHA																	50th	72
2011	Scott Wimmer	03	Dodge																ROA; 39	DAY																			50th	72
2011	Marc Davis	03	Chevy																				NSH; 43	IRP	IOW	GLN						DOV; DNQ							50th	72
2011	Jean-François Dumoulin	03	Chevy																								CGV; DNQ												50th	72
2011	Brian Simo	50	Chevy	DAY	PHO	LVS	BRI	CAL	TEX	TAL	NSH	RCH	DAR	DOV	IOW	CLT	CHI	MCH	ROA	DAY	KEN	NHA	NSH	IRP	IOW	GLN; DNQ	CGV	BRI	ATL	RCH	CHI	DOV	KAN	CLT	TEX	PHO	HOM		77th	0
2012	Scott Riggs	03	Chevy	DAY	PHO	LVS	BRI	CAL	TEX	RCH	TAL	DAR	IOW	CLT	DOV	MCH	ROA	KEN	DAY	NHA	CHI	IND	IOW	GLN	CGV	BRI	ATL	RCH	CHI	KEN	DOV	CLT	KAN	TEX; 34	PHO	HOM			66th	10

==== Car No. 23 history ====
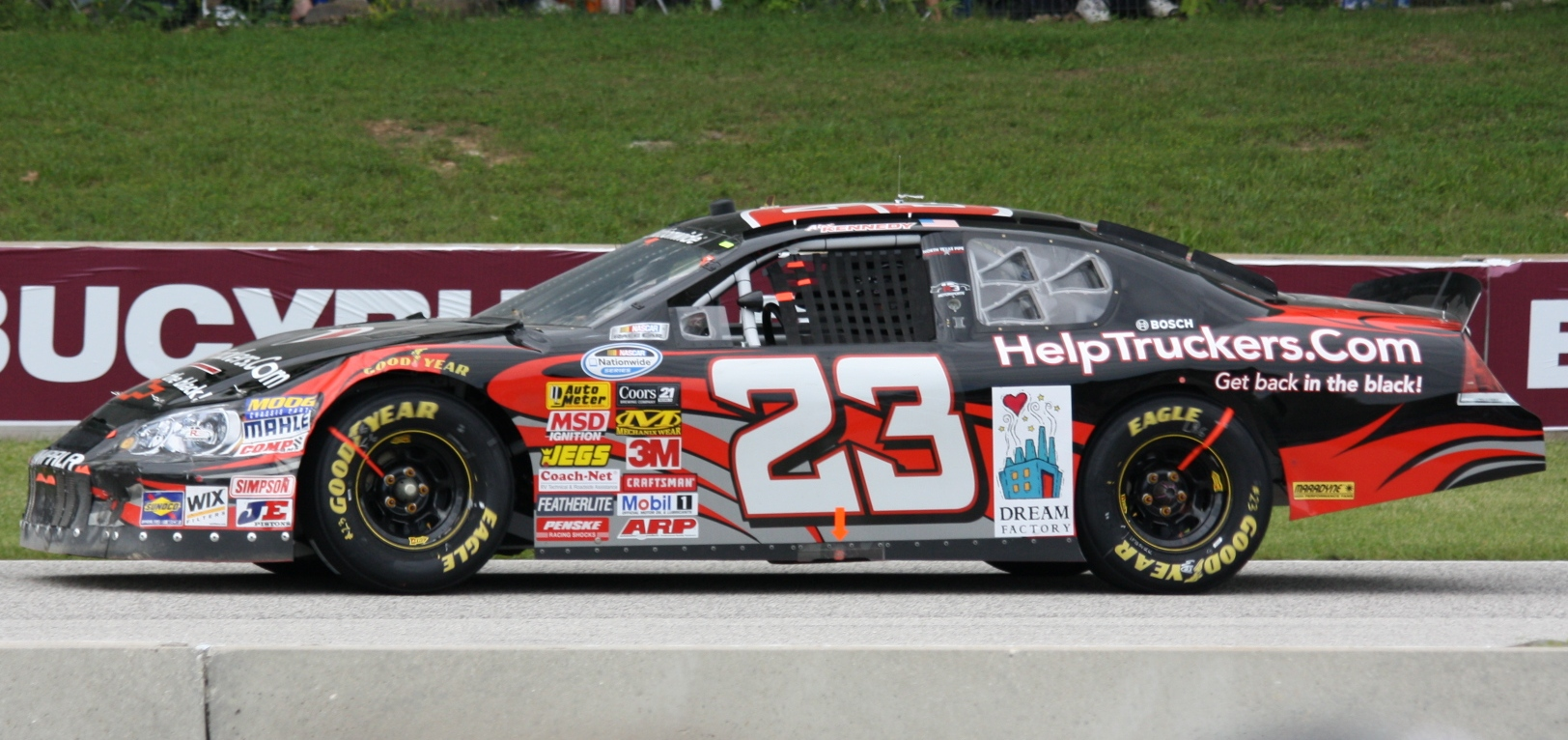
The No. 23 car in 2010

In 2008, R3 returned with Robert Richardson attempting 8 races and making 5. Renegade wheels served as the sponsor at Lowes and Mahindra Tractors at other races. Richardson had a best finish of 23rd at Kansas.

In 2009, the team ran a full schedule with Aaron's and Mahindra serving as the primary sponsors. Robert Richardson Jr and Ken Butler III served as the primary drivers for the season. For the race at the Circuit Gilles Villeneuve, Canadian driver Jean-Francois Dumoulin drove the car and finished in 7th (R3 Motorsports' best finish of the year). Jeff Fuller drove at Darlington Raceway and finished thirtieth.

For the 2010 season, R3 Motorsports fielded five drivers in the NASCAR Nationwide series No. 23. Robert Richardson III ran most of the tracks throughout the season. R3 hired Alex Kennedy for Road America and Watkins Glen. R3 Motorsports also hired Coleman Pressley (the son of former NASCAR Sprint cup series driver Robert Pressley) to drive at Bristol Motor Speedway and Nashville, the team finished 12th at Nashville. The team also ran with Marc Davis, Johnny Sauter, and Peyton Sellers each running one race.

For 2011, the No. 23 team returned and switched from Chevrolet to Dodge and was sponsored by Wildlife Conservation Society (WCS). Richardson has run the majority of the races. Richardson's best finish so far is 22nd at Las Vegas and Iowa. Alex Kennedy drove the No. 23 at Dover and America finishing 32nd and 21st respectively. Scott Riggs ran the No. 23 at Darlington finishing 13th, R3's best finish in 2011. The team made the switched back Chevrolet at Kentucky Motorspeedway and will remain in the Chevy Camp fielding Impala's.

They fielded the No. 23 full-time again in 2012 with Robert Richardson Jr. and Jamie Dick sharing the ride. Anthony Gandon ran the No. 23 at Mid-Ohio.

In 2015, R3 Motorsports shut down the team, with the shop being leased.

==== Car No. 23 results ====
Year	Driver	No.	Make	1	2	3	4	5	6	7	8	9	10	11	12	13	14	15	16	17	18	19	20	21	22	23	24	25	26	27	28	29	30	31	32	33	34	35	Owners	Pts
2008	Robert Richardson Jr.	23	Chevy	DAY	CAL	LVS	ATL	BRI	NSH	TEX	PHO	MXC	TAL	RCH	DAR	CLT; 38	DOV	NSH	KEN	MLW	NHA	DAY; 32	CHI; DNQ	GTY	IRP	CGV	GLN	MCH; 35	BRI	CAL	RCH	DOV	KAN; 23	CLT; DNQ	MEM	TEX; 36	PHO	HOM; DNQ	56th	374
2009	Robert Richardson Jr.	23	Chevy	DAY; 34			BRI; 29	TEX; 24			TAL; 16			CLT; 33		NSH; 21				DAY; 26	CHI; 28					MCH; 24			ATL; 22	RCH; 28		KAN; 22			MEM; 32	TEX; 26			27th	2946
2009	Ken Butler III	23	Chevy		CAL; 20	LVS; 17			NSH; 37	PHO; 28		RCH; 35			DOV; 37		KEN; 17	MLW; 26	NHA; 25			GTY; 25	IRP; 31	IOW; 33	GLN; QL		BRI; 22				DOV; 23			CLT; 35			PHO; 32	HOM; 27	27th	2946
2009	Jeff Fuller	23	Chevy										DAR; 30																										27th	2946
2009	Chris Cook	23	Chevy																						GLN; 31														27th	2946
2009	Jean-François Dumoulin	23	Chevy																									CGV; 7											27th	2946
2009	Kevin Conway	23	Chevy																														CAL; 18						27th	2946
2010	Robert Richardson Jr.	23	Chevy	DAY; 25	CAL; 33	LVS; 26		NSH; 23		TEX; 23	TAL; 20			DOV; 35	CLT; 23	NSH; 27	KEN; 30		NHA; 27	DAY; 32	CHI; 31		IRP; 15	IOW; 23		MCH; 33	BRI; 28		ATL; 33			KAN; 31	CAL; 26	CLT; 33		TEX; 27		HOM; 20	27th	3064
2010	Coleman Pressley	23	Chevy				BRI; 31					RCH; 18	DAR; 15																	RCH; 25							PHO; 17		27th	3064
2010	Johnny Sauter	23	Chevy						PHO; 15																														27th	3064
2010	Alex Kennedy	23	Chevy															ROA; 28				GTY; 24			GLN; 16			CGV; 26											27th	3064
2010	Marc Davis	23	Chevy																												DOV; 23								27th	3064
2010	Peyton Sellers	23	Chevy																																GTY; 20				27th	3064
2011	Robert Richardson Jr.	23	Dodge	DAY; 32	PHO; 24	LVS; 22	BRI; 37	CAL; 29	TEX; 26	TAL; 28	NSH; 34	RCH; 20			IOW; 22	CLT; 36	CHI; 32	MCH; 31		DAY; 31																			29th	540
2011	Robert Richardson Jr.	23	Chevy																		KEN; 33				IOW; 23				ATL; 26	RCH; 22	CHI; 29			CLT; 30	TEX; 25	PHO; 22	HOM; 22		29th	540
2011	Scott Riggs	23	Dodge										DAR; 13																										29th	540
2011	Scott Riggs	23	Chevy																													DOV; 31							29th	540
2011	Alex Kennedy	23	Dodge											DOV; 32					ROA; 21																				29th	540
2011	Alex Kennedy	23	Chevy																							GLN; 23	CGV; 33												29th	540
2011	David Green	23	Chevy																			NHA; 33																	29th	540
2011	Dennis Setzer	23	Dodge																				NSH; 34	IRP; 34															29th	540
2011	Dennis Setzer	23	Chevy																									BRI; 35											29th	540
2011	Angela Ruch	23	Chevy																														KAN; 32						29th	540
2012	Robert Richardson Jr.	23	Chevy	DAY; 35	PHO	LVS; 24	BRI	CAL; 21	TEX; 34	RCH; 34	TAL; 26	DAR	IOW	CLT; 39	DOV	MCH			DAY; 17	NHA	CHI	IND; 31	IOW			BRI; 24	ATL; 31	RCH; 22	CHI	KEN	DOV	CLT; 20	KAN; 39	TEX; 27	PHO	HOM; 33			29th	568
2012	Bill Prietzel	23	Chevy														ROA; 27	KEN																					29th	568
2012	Dexter Stacey	23	Chevy																					GLN; 32	CGV; 35														29th	568
2013	Robert Richardson Jr.	23	Chevy	DAY; 9	PHO	LVS; 29	BRI; 27	CAL	TEX; 31	RCH; 32	TAL; 20	DAR	CLT; 40	DOV	IOW	MCH	ROA	KEN	DAY; 32	NHA	CHI	IND; 30	IOW	GLN	MOH	BRI; 30	ATL; 25	RCH; 34	CHI	KEN	DOV	KAN	CLT; 27	TEX; 28	PHO	HOM			29th	537
2014	Robert Richardson Jr.	23	Chevy	DAY; 38	PHO	LVS; 31	BRI	CAL	TEX; 34	DAR	RCH	TAL; 32	IOW	CLT	DOV	MCH	ROA	KEN	DAY; 40	NHA	CHI	IND; 32	IOW	GLN	MOH	BRI	ATL	RCH	CHI	KEN	DOV	KAN	CLT	TEX; 29	PHO	HOM			31st	462

==== Car No. 80 history ====
In 2006, R3 attempted three Nationwide series races in the No. 80 Chevy with Richardson driving. The team did not qualify for any of their events.

R3 attempted only one race in 2007. Richardson attempted to qualify the No. 80 at Texas, but once again failed to qualify. After 2007, R3 shut down the No. 80 team.

==== Car No. 80 results ====
Year	Driver	No.	Make	1	2	3	4	5	6	7	8	9	10	11	12	13	14	15	16	17	18	19	20	21	22	23	24	25	26	27	28	29	30	31	32	33	34	35	Owners	Pts
2006	Robert Richardson Jr.	80	Chevy	DAY	CAL	MXC	LVS	ATL	BRI	TEX	NSH	PHO	TAL	RCH	DAR	CLT	DOV	NSH	KEN	MLW	DAY	CHI	NHA	MAR	GTY	IRP	GLN	MCH	BRI	CAL	RCH	DOV	KAN	CLT; DNQ	MEM	TEX; DNQ	PHO	HOM; DNQ	88th	53
2007	Robert Richardson Jr.	80	Chevy	DAY	CAL	MXC	LVS	ATL	BRI	NSH	TEX; DNQ	PHO	TAL	RCH	DAR	CLT	DOV	NSH	KEN	MLW	NHA	DAY	CHI	GTY	IRP	CGV	GLN	MCH	BRI	CAL	RCH	DOV	KAN	CLT	MEM	TEX	PHO	HOM	82nd	31

=== Sprint Cup Series ===
==== Car No. 23 history ====
R3 attempted the 2009 Daytona 500 with Mike Skinner, but did not qualify for the event.

In 2010, R3 Motorsports attempted to run the October race at Charlotte with Johnny Sauter driving, but failed to qualify. They also attempted the November Texas race with Josh Wise, but again did not qualify.

After not attempting a race for a year, they attempted the 2011 fall race at Phoenix with Scott Riggs but did not qualify.

For 2012, the team would attempt the full Sprint Cup Series schedule using cars purchased from Earnhardt Ganassi Racing, using the number 23. Robert Richardson Jr. ran two Daytona races and two Talladega races in Toyotas. Scott Riggs ran through the majority of the season, running Chevys. Riggs got the team qualified for the first time in Phoenix. The Cup team was a start-and-park operation to help fund the Nationwide Series team.

==== Car No. 23 results ====
Year	Driver	No.	Make	1	2	3	4	5	6	7	8	9	10	11	12	13	14	15	16	17	18	19	20	21	22	23	24	25	26	27	28	29	30	31	32	33	34	35	36	Owners	Pts
2009	Mike Skinner	23	Chevy	DAY; DNQ	CAL	LVS	ATL	BRI	MAR	TEX	PHO	TAL	RCH	DAR	CLT	DOV	POC	MCH	SON	NHA	DAY	CHI	IND	POC	GLN	MCH	BRI	ATL	RCH	NHA	DOV	KAN	CAL	CLT	MAR	TAL	TEX	PHO	HOM	65th	1
2010	Johnny Sauter	23	Toyota	DAY	CAL	LVS	ATL	BRI	MAR	PHO	TEX	TAL	RCH	DAR	DOV	CLT	POC	MCH	SON	NHA	DAY	CHI	IND	POC	GLN	MCH	BRI	ATL	RCH	NHA	DOV	KAN	CAL	CLT; DNQ	MAR	TAL				57th	35
2010	Josh Wise	23	Toyota																																		TEX; DNQ	PHO	HOM	57th	35
2011	Scott Riggs	23	Toyota	DAY	PHO	LVS	BRI	CAL	MAR	TEX	TAL	RCH	DAR	DOV	CLT	KAN	POC	MCH	SON	DAY	KEN	NHA	IND	POC	GLN	MCH	BRI	ATL	RCH	CHI	NHA	DOV	KAN	CLT	TAL	MAR	TEX	PHO; DNQ	HOM	59th	0
2012	Robert Richardson Jr.	23	Toyota	DAY; DNQ									TAL; 27								DAY; DNQ												TAL; 35							44th	82
2012	Scott Riggs	23	Chevy		PHO; 42	LVS; DNQ	BRI; 41	CAL; 41	MAR; 42	TEX; 42	KAN; 43	RCH; DNQ		DAR; DNQ	CLT; DNQ	DOV; 37	POC; 40	MCH; 41	SON	KEN; 43		NHA; 41	IND; 41	POC; 43	GLN	MCH; 41	BRI; 41	ATL; 40	RCH; 39	CHI; DNQ	NHA; DNQ	DOV; 42		CLT; DNQ	KAN; Wth	MAR; 42	TEX	PHO	HOM; 42	44th	82
