= 2012 Coke Zero 400 =

2012 Coke Zero 400 Powered by Coca-Cola at Daytona
Race details
- Race 18 of 36 in the 2012 NASCAR Sprint Cup Series
- 2012 Coke Zero 400 program cover
- Date: July 7, 2012
- Official name: Coke Zero 400 Powered by Coca-Cola at Daytona
- Location: Daytona International Speedway in Daytona Beach, Florida
- Course: Permanent racing facility
- Course length: 2.5 miles (4.02 km)
- Distance: 160 laps, 400 mi (643.27 km)
- Weather: Temperatures up to 96.1 °F (35.6 °C) with 0.47 inches (12 mm) of rain reported within 24 hours of the race; wind speeds up to 14 miles per hour (23 km/h)
- Average speed: 157.653 miles per hour (253.718 km/h)

Pole position
Driver	Matt Kenseth	Roush-Fenway Racing
- Time: 46.781

Most laps led
Driver	Matt Kenseth	Roush Fenway Racing
- Laps: 89

Winner
No. 14	Tony Stewart	Stewart–Haas Racing

Television in the United States
- Network: TNT
- Announcers: Adam Alexander, Wally Dallenbach Jr. and Kyle Petty
- Nielsen ratings: 5.449 million

The 2012 Coke Zero 400 was a NASCAR Sprint Cup Series stock car race held on July 7, 2012 at Daytona International Speedway in Daytona Beach, Florida. Contested over 160 laps, it was the eighteenth race of the 2012 NASCAR Sprint Cup Series season. Tony Stewart of Stewart–Haas Racing took his third win of the season, while Jeff Burton finished second and Matt Kenseth finished third.

This was the last race of Bill Elliott's 36-year career.

== Report ==
=== Background ===
Daytona International Speedway, where the race was held.

Daytona International Speedway was one of, at the time, six superspeedways to hold NASCAR races, the others being Michigan International Speedway, Auto Club Speedway, Indianapolis Motor Speedway, Pocono Raceway and Talladega Superspeedway. The standard track at Daytona International Speedway is a four-turn superspeedway that is 2.5 miles (4.0 km) long. The track's turns are banked at 31 degrees, while the front stretch, the location of the finish line, is banked at 18 degrees. David Ragan was the defending race winner.

Before the race, Matt Kenseth led the Drivers' Championship with 633 points, and Dale Earnhardt Jr. stood in second with 622. Jimmie Johnson was third in the Drivers' Championship with 610, two points ahead of Greg Biffle and thirty-four ahead of Denny Hamlin in fourth and fifth. Kevin Harvick, with 565, was eight points ahead of Clint Bowyer, as Martin Truex Jr. with 556 points, was eleven ahead of Tony Stewart and nineteen in front of Brad Keselowski. In the Manufacturers' Championship, Chevrolet was leading with 117 points, seventeen points ahead of Toyota. Ford, with 84 points, was eleven points ahead of Dodge in the battle for third.

=== Practice and qualifying ===
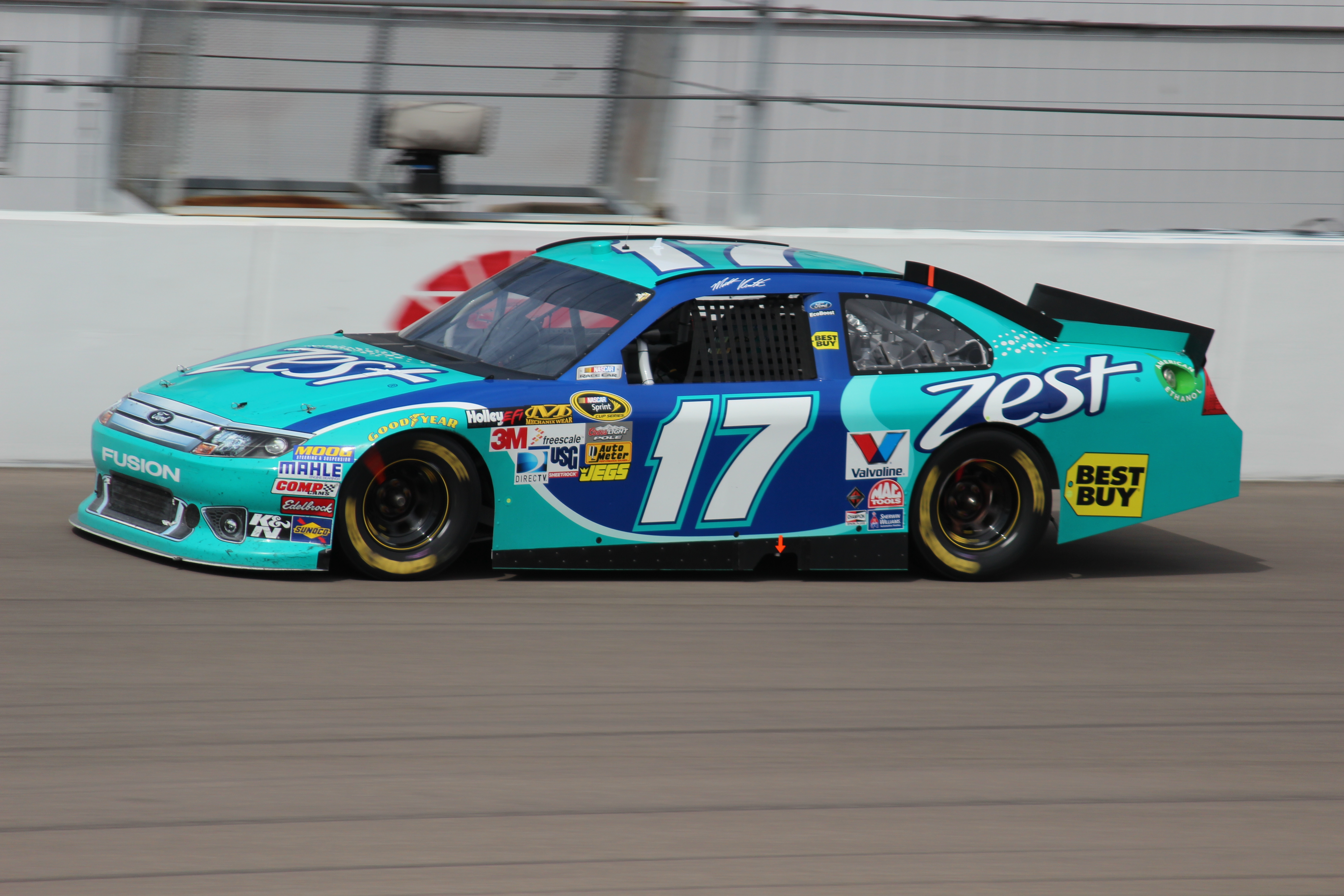
Matt Kenseth (car shown) won the pole position

Two practice sessions were also held before the race on July 5, 2012. The first session was 80 minutes long, while the second was 85 minutes. Aric Almirola was quickest with a time of 44.563 seconds in the first session, 0.130 faster than Marcos Ambrose. Joey Logano was third quickest, followed by Ryan Newman, Biffle, and Jeff Gordon. A. J. Allmendinger was seventh, still within half of a second of Almirola's time. In the second and final practice session, Jamie McMurray was quickest with a time of 45.492 seconds. Michael Waltrip, with a time of 45.516, was second quickest, ahead of Kurt Busch, Travis Kvapil, and Almirola. Regan Smith, Ambrose, Carl Edwards, Earnhardt Jr., and Juan Pablo Montoya completed the first ten positions.

Forty-four cars were entered for qualifying, but only forty-three could qualify for the race because of NASCAR's qualifying procedure. Kenseth clinched the eighth pole position of his career, with time of 46.781 seconds. He was joined on the front row of the grid by Stewart. Newman qualified third, Kasey Kahne took fourth, and Biffle started fifth. Gordon, Bill Elliott, Casey Mears, Allmendinger and Keselowski rounded out the top ten. The driver that failed to qualify for the race was Robert Richardson Jr. Once the qualifying session had concluded, Kenseth stated, "The interesting thing about qualifying, at least for me today, was nobody had any idea what the pole was going to be or how fast anybody was. They lined qualifying up by first practice speeds, but that was drafting for everybody. So, you really didn't know what anybody was going to run. That's the same lap we ran during a mock-up qualifying run [Friday], so I was glad we were able to repeat that, but I didn't know what anybody else was going to run. It's kind of fun to watch, because you really have no idea."

=== Prior to the race ===
Tony Stewart was stripped of his second place starting spot after his car failed post-qualifying inspection. A. J. Allmendinger was suspended by NASCAR after failing a drug test. Penske Racing scrambled to get Sam Hornish Jr. in the #22 and had Kenny Wallace (who himself was on standby for expectant father Kevin Harvick after NASCAR would not approve Austin Dillon for Sprint Cup competition at Daytona) ready to step in if Hornish couldn't make it to Daytona on time. Michael McDowell got into the #98 Phil Parsons Racing entry that Mike Bliss qualified.

== Race ==
Pole sitter Matt Kenseth lead the first lap of the race. Green flag pit stops began on lap 41 of the race. On lap 42, Kenseth gave the lead away to David Ragan to pit. Ragan soon pitted and Josh Wise took the lead followed by Martin Truex Jr. After everything cycled through, Greg Biffle was the new race leader. The first caution would fly on lap 81 of the race when Sam Hornish Jr. crashed on the backstretch. During pitstops, there was contact between Jeff Gordon, Ryan Newman, and Kasey Kahne after Newman made contact with Gordon as Newman was coming out of his pit stall and then made contact with Kahne which turned Newman around nearly making contact with Brad Keselowski. No one was hurt. Matt Kenseth won the race off of pit road and lead the field to the restart on lap 86. On lap 91, the second caution flew for a 6 car crash. It started when Aric Almirola made contact with Kurt Busch and sent Busch up into Trevor Bayne and sent both up into the wall. Behind them, Denny Hamlin and Juan Pablo Montoya made contact while Bobby Labonte spun to avoid the wreck. The race would restart on lap 96. With 37 laps to go, Kyle Busch took the lead. While he was doing that, the first big one struck on the front stretch taking out 7 cars. Cars were coming down pit road when Jimmie Johnson got turned from behind by Michael Waltrip and spun and nailed the inside wall on the front stretch. Waltrip spun and collected Jeff Gordon, Joey Logano, Bill Elliott, Regan Smith, and Martin Truex Jr. Tony Stewart won the race off of pit road and lead the field to the restart with 30 laps to go.

=== Final laps ===
With 16 laps to go, the 4th caution flew when Brad Keselowski spun off of turn 2. The race restarted with 12 to go. With 9 to go, Matt Kenseth took the lead from Stewart. With 8 to go, the second big one struck on the front stretch near turn 1 collecting 14 cars. It started when Denny Hamlin got turned by Kyle Busch and Hamlin came up and collected Busch, Juan Pablo Montoya, Trevor Bayne, Marcos Ambrose, Clint Bowyer, Jeff Gordon, David Reutimann, Dave Blaney, David Gilliland, Casey Mears, Paul Menard, David Ragan, and Martin Truex Jr. The wreck would set up a two lap shootout. Kenseth took the lead on the restart and began to battle Stewart for the lead. On the last lap, Stewart lost his drafting partner Kasey Kahne but Stewart kept on going and took the lead from Kenseth. Kenseth tried to get to Stewart's outside but contact between Matt Kenseth and Greg Biffle sent Biffle into Kevin Harvick and caused a 15 car crash that also collected Aric Almirola, Dave Blaney, Kyle Busch, David Ragan, Kasey Kahne, Travis Kvapil, Dale Earnhardt Jr, Regan Smith, Carl Edwards, Paul Menard, Terry Labonte, and Jamie McMurray. It brought out the 6th and final caution of the race and Tony Stewart won the race. This would be Stewart's 4th and final Coke Zero 400 win of his career along with his 3rd and final win of 2012. Jeff Burton, Matt Kenseth, Joey Logano, and Ryan Newman rounded out the top 5 while Carl Edwards, Kasey Kahne, Brad Keselowski, Michael Waltrip, and Bobby Labonte rounded out the top 10.

== Results ==
=== Qualifying ===
Grid	No.	Driver	Team	Manufacturer	Time	Speed
1	17	Matt Kenseth	Roush Fenway Racing	Ford	46.781	192.386
2	14	Tony Stewart^{1}	Stewart–Haas Racing	Chevrolet	46.787	192.361
3	39	Ryan Newman	Stewart–Haas Racing	Chevrolet	46.789	192.353
4	5	Kasey Kahne	Hendrick Motorsports	Chevrolet	46.804	192.291
5	16	Greg Biffle	Roush Fenway Racing	Ford	46.841	192.139
6	24	Jeff Gordon	Hendrick Motorsports	Chevrolet	46.860	192.061
7	50	Bill Elliott	Turner Motorsports	Chevrolet	46.872	192.012
8	13	Casey Mears	Germain Racing	Ford	46.891	191.934
9	22	A. J. Allmendinger^{2}	Penske Racing	Dodge	46.901	191.894
10	2	Brad Keselowski	Penske Racing	Dodge	46.910	191.857
11	9	Marcos Ambrose^{4}	Richard Petty Motorsports	Ford	46.918	191.824
12	29	Kevin Harvick	Richard Childress Racing	Chevrolet	46.924	191.799
13	99	Carl Edwards	Roush Fenway Racing	Ford	46.946	191.710
14	27	Paul Menard	Richard Childress Racing	Chevrolet	46.953	191.681
15	42	Juan Pablo Montoya	Earnhardt Ganassi Racing	Chevrolet	46.978	191.579
16	21	Trevor Bayne	Wood Brothers Racing	Ford	46.998	191.497
17	48	Jimmie Johnson	Hendrick Motorsports	Chevrolet	47.003	191.477
18	43	Aric Almirola	Richard Petty Motorsports	Ford	47.054	191.270
19	56	Martin Truex Jr.	Michael Waltrip Racing	Toyota	47.060	191.245
20	20	Joey Logano	Joe Gibbs Racing	Toyota	47.064	191.229
21	31	Jeff Burton	Richard Childress Racing	Chevrolet	47.097	191.095
22	98	Mike Bliss^{3}	Phil Parsons Racing	Ford	47.124	190.986
23	18	Kyle Busch	Joe Gibbs Racing	Toyota	47.134	190.945
24	11	Denny Hamlin	Joe Gibbs Racing	Toyota	47.140	190.921
25	88	Dale Earnhardt Jr.	Hendrick Motorsports	Chevrolet	47.158	190.848
26	78	Regan Smith	Furniture Row Racing	Chevrolet	47.190	190.718
27	30	David Stremme	Inception Motorsports	Toyota	47.203	190.666
28	34	David Ragan	Front Row Motorsports	Ford	47.215	190.617
29	55	Michael Waltrip	Michael Waltrip Racing	Toyota	47.220	190.597
30	15	Clint Bowyer	Michael Waltrip Racing	Toyota	47.230	190.557
31	1	Jamie McMurray	Earnhardt Ganassi Racing	Chevrolet	47.231	190.553
32	26	Josh Wise	Front Row Motorsports	Ford	47.325	190.174
33	38	David Gilliland	Front Row Motorsports	Ford	47.335	190.134
34	36	Dave Blaney	Tommy Baldwin Racing	Chevrolet	47.339	190.118
35	32	Terry Labonte	FAS Lane Racing	Ford	47.357	190.046
36	51	Kurt Busch	Phoenix Racing	Chevrolet	47.370	189.994
37	87	Joe Nemechek	NEMCO Motorsports	Toyota	47.450	189.673
38	33	Stephen Leicht	Circle Sport Racing	Chevrolet	47.690	188.719
39	83	Landon Cassill	BK Racing	Toyota	47.699	188.683
40	10	David Reutimann	Tommy Baldwin Racing	Chevrolet	47.733	188.549
41	93	Travis Kvapil	BK Racing	Toyota	47.888	187.939
42	47	Bobby Labonte	JTG Daugherty Racing	Toyota	48.256	186.505
43	49	J. J. Yeley	Robinson-Blakeney Racing	Toyota	48.123	187.021
Failed to Qualify
	23	Robert Richardson Jr.	R3 Motorsports	Toyota	48.171	186.834

Notes
^1 — Tony Stewart will have to start forty-second after his time and speed was disallowed because of an air hose violation found in post-qualifying inspection. Stewart was later docked six points for the infraction.
^2 — Sam Hornish Jr. replaced Allmendinger after he failed a drug test.
^3 — Michael McDowell raced in the car.
^4 — Marcos Ambrose started in the rear due to an unapproved change to the car under impound race rules.

=== Race results ===
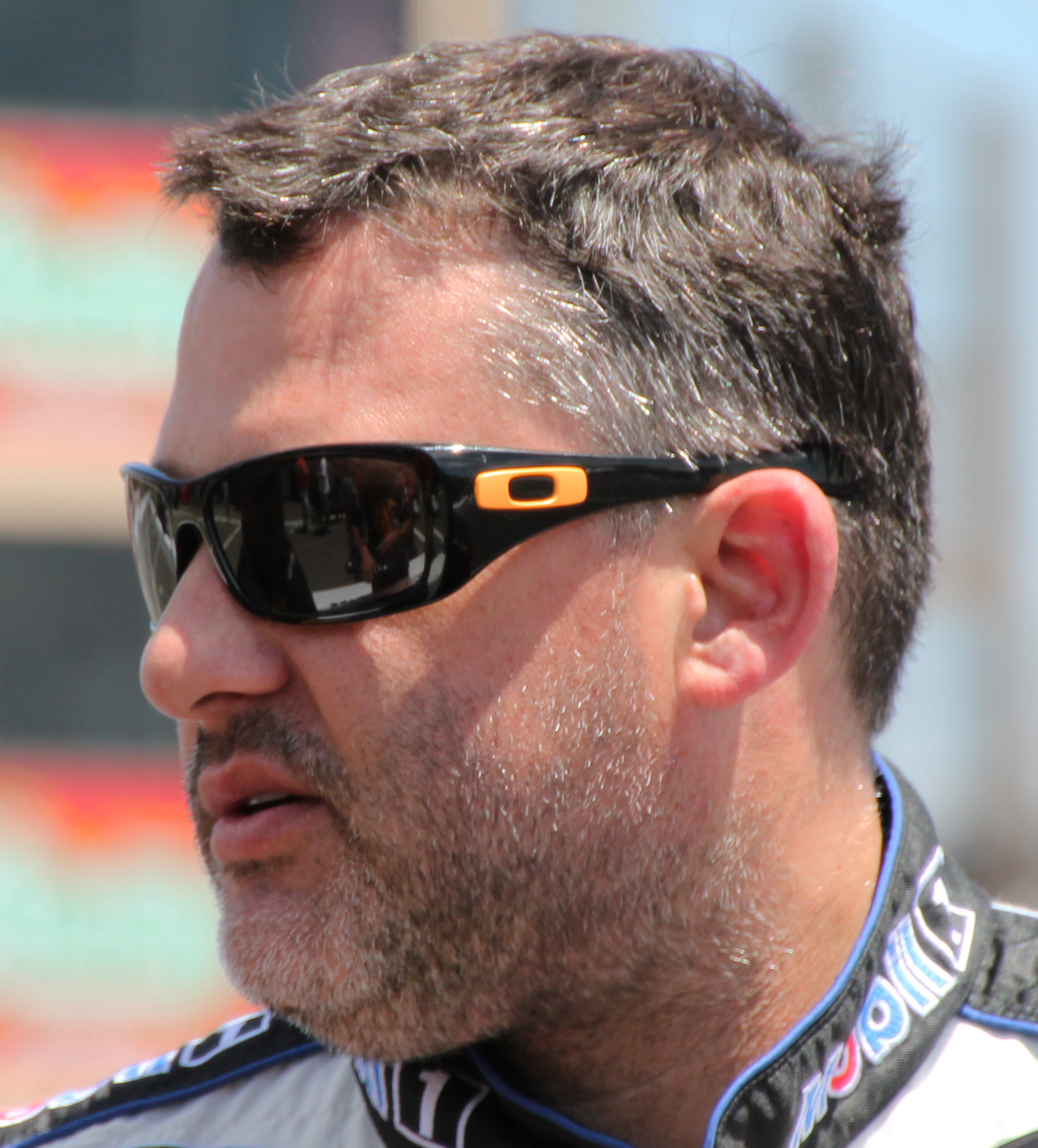
Tony Stewart won the race.

Pos	Car	Driver	Team	Manufacturer	Laps Run	Points
1	14	Tony Stewart	Stewart–Haas Racing	Chevrolet	160	47
2	31	Jeff Burton	Richard Childress Racing	Chevrolet	160	42
3	17	Matt Kenseth	Roush-Fenway Racing	Ford	160	43
4	20	Joey Logano	Joe Gibbs Racing	Toyota	160	40
5	39	Ryan Newman	Stewart–Haas Racing	Chevrolet	160	39
6	99	Carl Edwards	Roush-Fenway Racing	Ford	160	38
7	5	Kasey Kahne	Hendrick Motorsports	Chevrolet	160	37
8	2	Brad Keselowski	Penske Racing	Dodge	160	36
9	55	Michael Waltrip	Michael Waltrip Racing	Toyota	160	0
10	47	Bobby Labonte	JTG Daugherty Racing	Toyota	160	34
11	10	David Reutimann	Tommy Baldwin Racing	Chevrolet	160	33
12	24	Jeff Gordon	Hendrick Motorsports	Chevrolet	160	32
13	1	Jamie McMurray	Earnhardt Ganassi Racing	Chevrolet	160	31
14	27	Paul Menard	Richard Childress Racing	Chevrolet	160	30
15	88	Dale Earnhardt Jr.	Hendrick Motorsports	Chevrolet	160	29
16	93	Travis Kvapil	BK Racing	Toyota	160	28
17	56	Martin Truex Jr.	Michael Waltrip Racing	Toyota	160	28
18	13	Casey Mears	Germain Racing	Toyota	160	27
19	43	Aric Almirola	Richard Petty Motorsports	Ford	160	25
20	32	Terry Labonte	FAS Lane Racing	Ford	160	0
21	16	Greg Biffle	Roush-Fenway Racing	Ford	160	24
22	36	Dave Blaney	Tommy Baldwin Racing	Chevrolet	160	22
23	29	Kevin Harvick	Richard Childress Racing	Chevrolet	160	21
24	18	Kyle Busch	Joe Gibbs Racing	Toyota	160	21
25	11	Denny Hamlin	Joe Gibbs Racing	Toyota	156	19
26	34	David Ragan	Front Row Motorsports	Ford	155	19
27	21	Trevor Bayne	Wood Brothers Racing	Ford	152	0
28	42	Juan Pablo Montoya	Earnhardt Ganassi Racing	Chevrolet	152	16
29	15	Clint Bowyer	Michael Waltrip Racing	Toyota	152	15
30	9	Marcos Ambrose	Richard Petty Motorsports	Ford	152	14
31	38	David Gilliland	Front Row Motorsports	Ford	152	14
32	83	Landon Cassill	BK Racing	Toyota	151	12
33	22	Sam Hornish Jr.	Penske Racing	Dodge	149	0
34	78	Regan Smith	Furniture Row Racing	Chevrolet	133	10
35	51	Kurt Busch	Phoenix Racing	Chevrolet	132	9
36	48	Jimmie Johnson	Hendrick Motorsports	Chevrolet	124	8
37	50	Bill Elliott	Turner Motorsports	Chevrolet	123	7
38	26	Josh Wise	Front Row Motorsports	Ford	47	7
39	30	David Stremme	Inception Motorsports	Toyota	25	5
40	49	J. J. Yeley	Robinson-Blakeney Racing	Toyota	16	4
41	87	Joe Nemechek	NEMCO Motorsports	Toyota	10	0
42	33	Stephen Leicht	Circle Sport Racing	Chevrolet	4	2
43	98	Michael McDowell	Phil Parsons Racing	Ford	3	1

== Standings after the race ==
Drivers' Championship standings

Pos	Driver	Points
1	Matt Kenseth	676
2	Dale Earnhardt Jr.	651
3	Greg Biffle	632
4	Jimmie Johnson	618
5	Tony Stewart	592

Manufacturers' Championship standings

Pos	Manufacturer	Points
1	Chevrolet	126
2	Toyota	104
3	Ford	90
4	Dodge	76

- Note: Only the top five positions are included for the driver standings.

Previous race: 2012 Quaker State 400	Sprint Cup Series; 2012 season	Next race: 2012 Lenox Industrial Tools 301
