= 2012 Brickyard 400 =

2012 Crown Royal Presents the Curtiss Shaver 400 at the Brickyard
Race details
- Race 20 of 36 in the 2012 NASCAR Sprint Cup Series
- Date: July 29, 2012
- Official name: Crown Royal Presents the "Your Hero's Name Here" 400 at the Brickyard Powered By BigMachineRecords.com
- Location: Indianapolis Motor Speedway in Speedway, Indiana
- Course: Permanent racing facility
- Course length: 2.5 miles (4.023 km)
- Distance: 160 laps, 400 mi (643.737 km)
- Weather: Clear with a high temperature around 88 °F (31 °C); wind out of the S at 5 mph (8.0 km/h).

Pole position
| Driver | Denny Hamlin | Joe Gibbs Racing |
- Time: 49.244

Most laps led
| Driver | Jimmie Johnson | Hendrick Motorsports |
- Laps: 99

Winner
| No. 48 | Jimmie Johnson | Hendrick Motorsports |

Television in the United States
- Network: ESPN
- Announcers: Allen Bestwick, Dale Jarrett and Andy Petree

The 2012 Crown Royal Presents the Curtiss Shaver 400 at the Brickyard powered by BigMachineRecords.com, the 19th running of the event, was a NASCAR Sprint Cup Series race held on July 29, 2012, at the Indianapolis Motor Speedway in Speedway, Indiana. Contested over 160 laps, was the twentieth race of the 2012 NASCAR Sprint Cup Series season. Jimmie Johnson, of the Hendrick Motorsports racing team, won his third race of the season ahead of Kyle Busch in second. Greg Biffle finished in the third position.

== Report ==
=== Background ===
Indianapolis Motor Speedway, the race track where the race was held.

Indianapolis Motor Speedway is one of six superspeedways to hold NASCAR races. The standard track at Indianapolis Motor Speedway is a four-turn rectangular-oval track that is 2.5 miles (4.0 km) long. The track's turns are banked at 9 degrees, while the front stretch, the location of the finish line, has no banking. The back stretch, opposite of the front, also has none. The racetrack has seats for 250,000 spectators.

Before the race, Matt Kenseth led the Drivers' Championship with 707 points, and Dale Earnhardt Jr. stood in second with 691. Greg Biffle was third in the Drivers' Championship with 667 points, eleven ahead of Jimmie Johnson and 39 ahead of Denny Hamlin in fourth and fifth. Kevin Harvick with 622 was four ahead of Tony Stewart, as Martin Truex Jr. with 617 points, was three ahead of Clint Bowyer, and four in front of Brad Keselowski. In the Manufacturers' Championship, Chevrolet was leading with 135 points, 25 ahead of Toyota. Ford, with 93 points, was thirteen points ahead of Dodge in the battle for third. Paul Menard is the defending winner of the race.

In 2011, Crown Royal announced that they would move their sponsorship from Richmond International Raceway to Indianapolis to rename the Brickyard 400 to Crown Royal "Your Hero's Name Goes Here" 400 at the Brickyard. Once the naming rights contest concluded, Curtiss Shaver, a firefighter from Troy, Alabama, was announced the winner, making the official race name for the 2012 race, the Crown Royal Curtiss Shaver 400 at the Brickyard.

Indianapolis Motor Speedway also made changes to the garages in 2012 as part of the new format of having both a first and second tier series race at the Speedway. For the first time, the top 35 Cup teams would no longer use the traditional Gasoline Alley garages. Instead, the top teams in points would be parked in the "new" garages located on pit road used first for Formula One and later for MotoGP. NASCAR Inspection would be held in the pitside garages, and lower teams and the Nationwide Series (racing for the first time at Indianapolis) will use Gasoline Alley.

=== Practice and qualifying ===
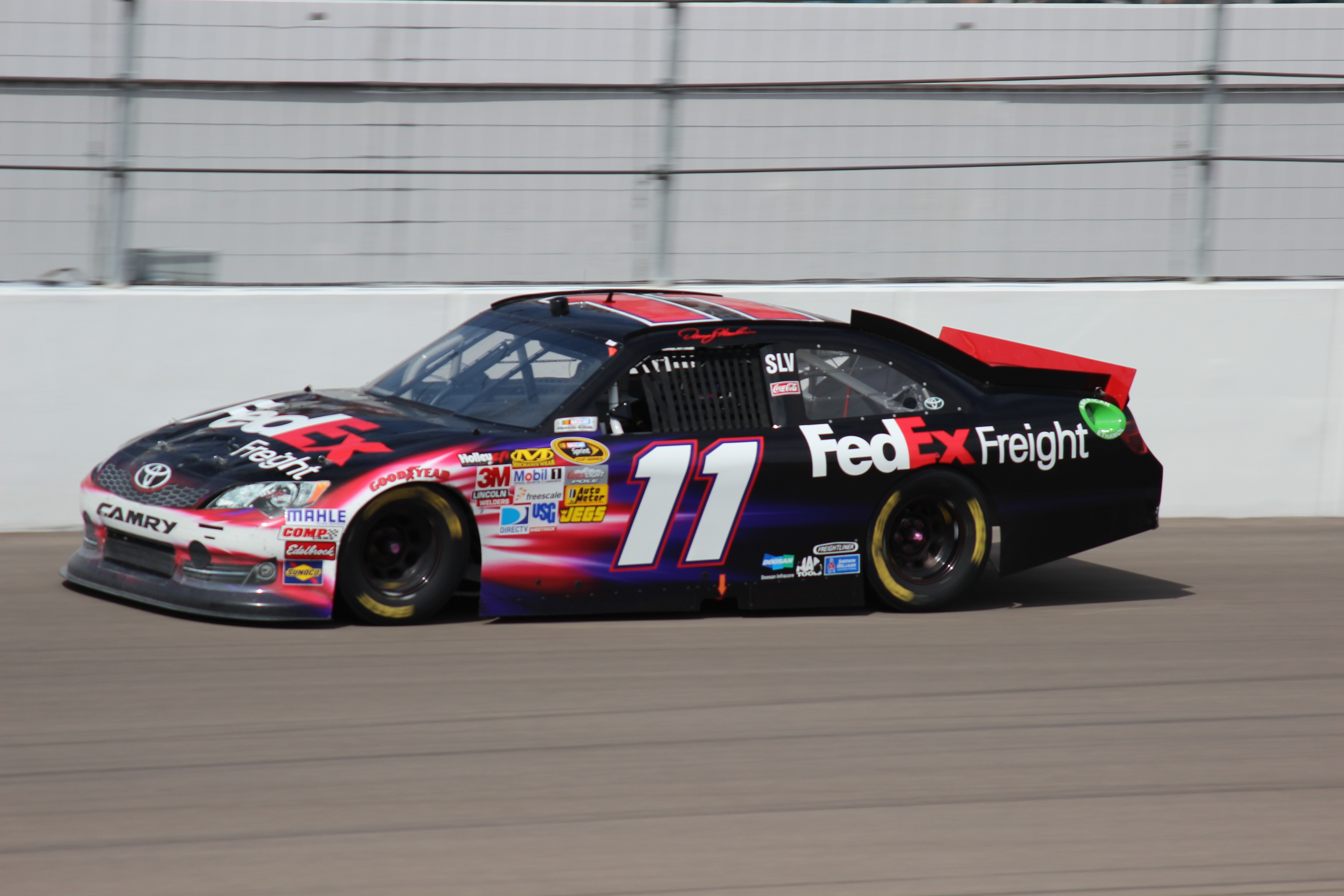
Denny Hamlin won the pole position with a time of 49.244

Two practice sessions were held before the race on July 28, 2012. The first session was 60 minutes long, while the second was 110 minutes. Kasey Kahne was quickest with a time of 48.563 seconds in the first session, 0.478 faster than Mark Martin. Jeff Gordon was third quickest, followed by Johnson, Keselowski, and Menard. Earnhardt Jr. was seventh, still within a second of Kahne's time. In the second and final practice session, Biffle was quickest with a time of 49.587 seconds. Carl Edwards, with a time of 49.660, was second quickest, ahead of Joey Logano, Kahne, and Kenseth. Johnson, Regan Smith, Gordon, Jeff Burton, and Hamlin completed the first ten positions.

Forty-six cars were entered for qualifying, but only forty-three could qualify for the race because of NASCAR's qualifying procedure. Hamlin clinched his first pole position at Indianapolis Motor Speedway, with a time of 49.244 seconds. He was joined on the front row of the grid by Edwards. Logano qualified third, Aric Almirola took fourth, and Biffle started fifth. Johnson, Kyle Busch, Menard, Gordon and Kenseth rounded out the top ten. The drivers that failed to qualify for the race were Reed Sorenson, Joe Nemechek, Michael McDowell. McDowell's time was disallowed after his car failed inspection; Mike Bliss was awarded a spot in the field.

Once the qualifying session had concluded, Hamlin stated, "We knew this was the turning point of the season. From Indy until Richmond is when you start seeing who's going to fight for a championship. Everyone's got their Chase cars prepared, bringing them to the track, and that's when you want to start running good. Every year with six to seven races before the Chase, we start running all out to see where we stack up against the field. If this is any indication, we hope it's 2010 all over with except the ending."

== Results ==
=== Qualifying ===
| Grid | No. | Driver | Team | Manufacturer | Time (s) | Speed |
|---|---|---|---|---|---|---|
| 1 | 11 | Denny Hamlin | Joe Gibbs Racing | Toyota | 49.244 | 182.763 mph (294.129 km/h) |
| 2 | 99 | Carl Edwards | Roush Fenway Racing | Ford | 49.455 | 181.984 mph (292.875 km/h) |
| 3 | 20 | Joey Logano | Joe Gibbs Racing | Toyota | 49.517 | 181.756 mph (292.508 km/h) |
| 4 | 43 | Aric Almirola | Richard Petty Motorsports | Ford | 49.538 | 181.679 mph (292.384 km/h) |
| 5 | 16 | Greg Biffle | Roush Fenway Racing | Ford | 49.578 | 181.532 mph (292.147 km/h) |
| 6 | 48 | Jimmie Johnson | Hendrick Motorsports | Chevrolet | 49.626 | 181.357 mph (291.866 km/h) |
| 7 | 18 | Kyle Busch | Joe Gibbs Racing | Toyota | 49.711 | 181.046 mph (291.365 km/h) |
| 8 | 27 | Paul Menard | Richard Childress Racing | Chevrolet | 49.720 | 181.014 mph (291.314 km/h) |
| 9 | 24 | Jeff Gordon | Hendrick Motorsports | Chevrolet | 49.737 | 180.952 mph (291.214 km/h) |
| 10 | 17 | Matt Kenseth | Roush Fenway Racing | Ford | 49.819 | 180.654 mph (290.734 km/h) |
| 11 | 39 | Ryan Newman | Stewart–Haas Racing | Chevrolet | 49.831 | 180.611 mph (290.665 km/h) |
| 12 | 42 | Juan Pablo Montoya | Earnhardt Ganassi Racing | Chevrolet | 49.857 | 180.516 mph (290.512 km/h) |
| 13 | 51 | Kurt Busch | Phoenix Racing | Chevrolet | 49.865 | 180.487 mph (290.466 km/h) |
| 14 | 78 | Regan Smith | Furniture Row Racing | Chevrolet | 49.869 | 180.473 mph (290.443 km/h) |
| 15 | 5 | Kasey Kahne | Hendrick Motorsports | Chevrolet | 49.876 | 180.447 mph (290.401 km/h) |
| 16 | 1 | Jamie McMurray | Earnhardt Ganassi Racing | Chevrolet | 49.879 | 180.437 mph (290.385 km/h) |
| 17 | 56 | Martin Truex Jr. | Michael Waltrip Racing | Toyota | 49.880 | 180.433 mph (290.379 km/h) |
| 18 | 21 | Trevor Bayne | Wood Brothers Racing | Ford | 49.892 | 180.390 mph (290.310 km/h) |
| 19 | 55 | Mark Martin | Michael Waltrip Racing | Toyota | 49.893 | 180.386 mph (290.303 km/h) |
| 20 | 88 | Dale Earnhardt Jr. | Hendrick Motorsports | Chevrolet | 49.932 | 180.245 mph (290.076 km/h) |
| 21 | 31 | Jeff Burton | Richard Childress Racing | Chevrolet | 49.951 | 180.177 mph (289.967 km/h) |
| 22 | 2 | Brad Keselowski | Penske Racing | Dodge | 49.959 | 180.148 mph (289.920 km/h) |
| 23 | 9 | Marcos Ambrose | Richard Petty Motorsports | Ford | 49.980 | 180.072 mph (289.798 km/h) |
| 24 | 22 | Sam Hornish Jr. | Penske Racing | Dodge | 50.020 | 179.928 mph (289.566 km/h) |
| 25 | 13 | Casey Mears | Germain Racing | Ford | 50.134 | 179.519 mph (288.908 km/h) |
| 26 | 30 | David Stremme | Inception Motorsports | Toyota | 50.220 | 179.212 mph (288.414 km/h) |
| 27 | 29 | Kevin Harvick | Richard Childress Racing | Chevrolet | 50.309 | 178.894 mph (287.902 km/h) |
| 28 | 14 | Tony Stewart | Stewart–Haas Racing | Chevrolet | 50.318 | 178.862 mph (287.850 km/h) |
| 29 | 47 | Bobby Labonte | JTG Daugherty Racing | Toyota | 50.331 | 178.816 mph (287.776 km/h) |
| 30 | 93 | Travis Kvapil | BK Racing | Toyota | 50.408 | 178.543 mph (287.337 km/h) |
| 31 | 38 | David Gilliland | Front Row Motorsports | Ford | 50.418 | 178.508 mph (287.281 km/h) |
| 32 | 36 | Dave Blaney | Tommy Baldwin Racing | Chevrolet | 50.424 | 178.486 mph (287.245 km/h) |
| 33 | 15 | Clint Bowyer | Michael Waltrip Racing | Toyota | 50.443 | 178.419 mph (287.138 km/h) |
| 34 | 95 | Scott Speed | Leavine Family Racing | Ford | 50.603 | 177.855 mph (286.230 km/h) |
| 35 | 26 | Josh Wise | Front Row Motorsports | Ford | 50.635 | 177.743 mph (286.050 km/h) |
| 36 | 34 | David Ragan | Front Row Motorsports | Ford | 50.667 | 177.630 mph (285.868 km/h) |
| 37 | 33 | Stephen Leicht | Circle Sport Racing | Chevrolet | 50.748 | 177.347 mph (285.412 km/h) |
| 38 | 83 | Landon Cassill | BK Racing | Toyota | 50.750 | 177.340 mph (285.401 km/h) |
| 39 | 79 | Mike Skinner | Go Green Racing | Ford | 50.878 | 176.894 mph (284.683 km/h) |
| 40 | 23 | Scott Riggs | R3 Motorsports | Toyota | 50.888 | 176.859 mph (284.627 km/h) |
| 41 | 10 | J. J. Yeley | Tommy Baldwin Racing | Chevrolet | 50.985 | 176.523 mph (284.086 km/h) |
| 42 | 32 | Ken Schrader | FAS Lane Racing | Ford | 51.497 | 174.768 mph (281.262 km/h) |
| 43 | 19 | Mike Bliss | Humphrey Smith Racing | Toyota | 51.084 | 176.180 mph (283.534 km/h) |
Failed to Qualify
| | 91 | Reed Sorenson | Humphrey Smith Racing | Ford | 51.250 | 175.610 mph (282.617 km/h) |
| | 87 | Joe Nemechek | NEMCO Motorsports | Toyota | 51.387 | 175.142 mph (281.864 km/h) |
| | 98 | Michael McDowell | Phil Parsons Racing | Ford | 50.590 | 177.901 mph (286.304 km/h) |
McDowell's time was disallowed after his car failed inspection.

=== Race results ===
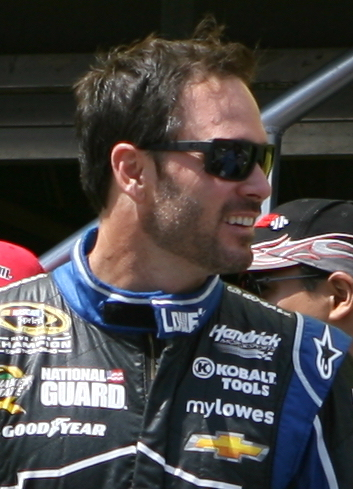
Jimmie Johnson won his fourth Brickyard 400.

| Pos | Car | Driver | Team | Manufacturer | Laps | Points |
|---|---|---|---|---|---|---|
| 1 | 48 | Jimmie Johnson (W) | Hendrick Motorsports | Chevrolet | 160 | 48 |
| 2 | 18 | Kyle Busch | Joe Gibbs Racing | Toyota | 160 | 43 |
| 3 | 16 | Greg Biffle | Roush Fenway Racing | Ford | 160 | 42 |
| 4 | 88 | Dale Earnhardt Jr. | Hendrick Motorsports | Chevrolet | 160 | 40 |
| 5 | 24 | Jeff Gordon (W) | Hendrick Motorsports | Chevrolet | 160 | 40 |
| 6 | 11 | Denny Hamlin | Joe Gibbs Racing | Toyota | 160 | 39 |
| 7 | 39 | Ryan Newman | Stewart–Haas Racing | Chevrolet | 160 | 37 |
| 8 | 56 | Martin Truex Jr. | Michael Waltrip Racing | Toyota | 160 | 36 |
| 9 | 2 | Brad Keselowski | Penske Racing | Dodge | 160 | 36 |
| 10 | 14 | Tony Stewart (W) | Stewart–Haas Racing | Chevrolet | 160 | 34 |
| 11 | 55 | Mark Martin | Michael Waltrip Racing | Toyota | 160 | 33 |
| 12 | 5 | Kasey Kahne | Hendrick Motorsports | Chevrolet | 160 | 32 |
| 13 | 29 | Kevin Harvick (W) | Richard Childress Racing | Chevrolet | 160 | 31 |
| 14 | 27 | Paul Menard (W) | Richard Childress Racing | Chevrolet | 160 | 30 |
| 15 | 15 | Clint Bowyer | Michael Waltrip Racing | Toyota | 160 | 29 |
| 16 | 22 | Sam Hornish Jr. | Penske Racing | Dodge | 160 | 0 |
| 17 | 21 | Trevor Bayne | Wood Brothers Racing | Ford | 160 | 0 |
| 18 | 78 | Regan Smith | Furniture Row Racing | Chevrolet | 160 | 26 |
| 19 | 43 | Aric Almirola | Richard Petty Motorsports | Ford | 160 | 25 |
| 20 | 9 | Marcos Ambrose | Richard Petty Motorsports | Ford | 160 | 24 |
| 21 | 42 | Juan Pablo Montoya | Earnhardt Ganassi Racing | Chevrolet | 160 | 23 |
| 22 | 1 | Jamie McMurray (W) | Earnhardt Ganassi Racing | Chevrolet | 160 | 22 |
| 23 | 36 | Dave Blaney | Tommy Baldwin Racing | Chevrolet | 160 | 21 |
| 24 | 30 | David Stremme | Inception Motorsports | Toyota | 160 | 20 |
| 25 | 83 | Landon Cassill | BK Racing | Toyota | 160 | 20 |
| 26 | 47 | Bobby Labonte (W) | JTG Daugherty Racing | Toyota | 160 | 19 |
| 27 | 38 | David Gilliland | Front Row Motorsports | Ford | 160 | 17 |
| 28 | 34 | David Ragan | Front Row Motorsports | Ford | 160 | 16 |
| 29 | 99 | Carl Edwards | Roush Fenway Racing | Ford | 156 | 15 |
| 30 | 32 | Ken Schrader | FAS Lane Racing | Ford | 156 | 14 |
| 31 | 33 | Stephen Leicht (R) | Circle Sport Racing | Chevrolet | 154 | 13 |
| 32 | 31 | Jeff Burton | Richard Childress Racing | Chevrolet | 151 | 12 |
| 33 | 20 | Joey Logano | Joe Gibbs Racing | Toyota | 144 | 11 |
| 34 | 13 | Casey Mears | Germain Racing | Ford | 137 | 10 |
| 35 | 17 | Matt Kenseth | Roush Fenway Racing | Ford | 132 | 10 |
| 36 | 51 | Kurt Busch | Phoenix Racing | Chevrolet | 126 | 8 |
| 37 | 93 | Travis Kvapil | BK Racing | Toyota | 40 | 7 |
| 38 | 95 | Scott Speed | Leavine Family Racing | Ford | 23 | 6 |
| 39 | 10 | J. J. Yeley | Tommy Baldwin Racing | Chevrolet | 20 | 5 |
| 40 | 26 | Josh Wise (R) | Front Row Motorsports | Ford | 19 | 4 |
| 41 | 23 | Scott Riggs | R3 Motorsports | Toyota | 14 | 3 |
| 42 | 79 | Mike Skinner | Go Green Racing | Ford | 11 | 2 |
| 43 | 19 | Mike Bliss | Humphrey Smith Racing | Toyota | 5 | 0 |

== Standings after the race ==
Drivers' Championship standings

| Pos | Driver | Points |
|---|---|---|
| 1 | Dale Earnhardt Jr. | 731 |
| 2 | Matt Kenseth | 717 |
| 3 | Greg Biffle | 709 |
| 4 | Jimmie Johnson | 704 |
| 5 | Denny Hamlin | 667 |
| 6 | Kevin Harvick | 653 |
| 7 | Martin Truex Jr. | 653 |
| 8 | Tony Stewart | 652 |
| 9 | Brad Keselowski | 649 |
| 10 | Clint Bowyer | 643 |

Manufacturers' Championship standings

| Pos | Manufacturer | Points |
|---|---|---|
| 1 | Chevrolet | 144 |
| 2 | Toyota | 116 |
| 3 | Ford | 97 |
| 4 | Dodge | 83 |

- Note: Only the top ten positions are included for the driver standings.

| Previous race: 2012 Lenox Industrial Tools 301 | Sprint Cup Series; 2012 season | Next race: 2012 Pennsylvania 400 |
