= 2012 Subway Fresh Fit 500 =

Race details
- Race 2 of 36 in the 2012 NASCAR Sprint Cup Series
- The 2012 Subway Fresh Fit 500 program cover, featuring last year's winner, Jeff Gordon.
- Date: March 4, 2012
- Location: Phoenix International Raceway in Avondale, Arizona
- Course: Permanent racing facility
- Course length: 1 miles (1.6 km)
- Distance: 312 laps, 312 mi (502.115 km)
- Average speed: 110.085 miles per hour (177.165 km/h)

Pole position
Driver	Mark Martin	Michael Waltrip Racing
- Time: 26.313

Most laps led
Driver	Kevin Harvick	Richard Childress Racing
- Laps: 88

Winner
No. 11	Denny Hamlin	Joe Gibbs Racing

Television in the United States
- Network: Fox
- Announcers: Mike Joy, Darrell Waltrip and Larry McReynolds

The 2012 Subway Fresh Fit 500 was a NASCAR Sprint Cup Series stock car race that was held on March 4, 2012 at Phoenix International Raceway in Avondale, Arizona. Contested over 312 laps, it was the second race of the 2012 season. The race was won by Denny Hamlin for the Joe Gibbs Racing team. Kevin Harvick finished second, followed by Greg Biffle in third.

== Report ==
=== Background ===
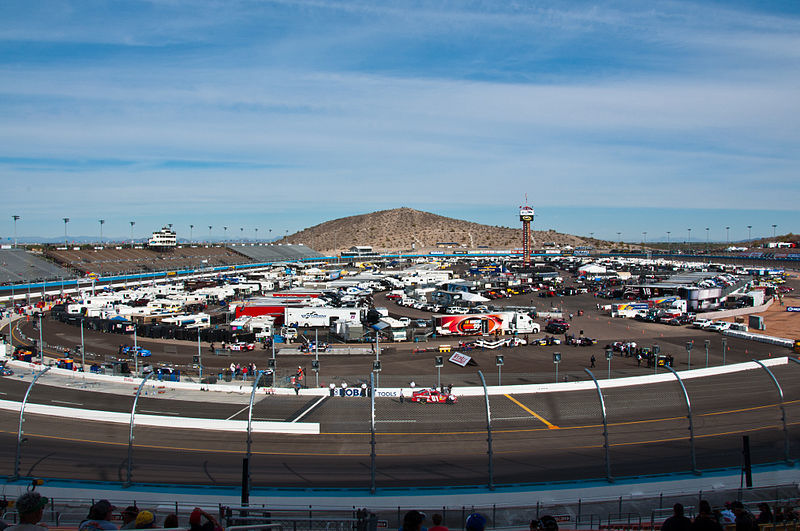
Phoenix International Raceway, where the race was held.

The layout of Phoenix International Raceway at the time the race was held. The layout was run from 2011-2018.

Phoenix International Raceway is one of five short tracks to hold NASCAR races; the others are Richmond International Raceway, Dover International Speedway, Bristol Motor Speedway, and Martinsville Speedway. The standard track at Phoenix International Raceway is a four-turn short track oval that is 1 mile (1.6 km) long. The first two turns are banked from 10 to 11 degrees, while the final two turns are banked from 8 to 9 degrees. The front stretch, the location of the finish line, is banked at three degrees. The back stretch, nicknamed the 'dogleg', varies from 10 to 11 degree banking. The racetrack has seats for 76,800 spectators.

Before the race, Matt Kenseth led the Drivers' Championship with 47 points, and Dale Earnhardt Jr. stood in second with 42 points. Greg Biffle and Denny Hamlin followed in third and fourth with the same amount, two ahead of Jeff Burton and three ahead of Paul Menard in fifth and sixth. Kevin Harvick with 37 was one point ahead of Carl Edwards, as Joey Logano with 36 points, was one ahead of Mark Martin three ahead of Clint Bowyer and Martin Truex Jr. In the Manufacturers' Championship, Ford was leading with nine points, three points ahead of Chevrolet. Toyota, with 4 points, was one point ahead of Dodge in the battle for third. Jeff Gordon is the race's defending winner.

=== Entry list ===
(R) - Denotes rookie driver.

(i) - Denotes driver who is ineligible for series driver points.

No.	Driver	Team	Manufacturer
1	Jamie McMurray	Earnhardt Ganassi Racing	Chevrolet
2	Brad Keselowski	Penske Racing	Dodge
5	Kasey Kahne	Hendrick Motorsports	Chevrolet
7	Robby Gordon	Robby Gordon Motorsports	Dodge
9	Marcos Ambrose	Richard Petty Motorsports	Ford
10	David Reutimann	Tommy Baldwin Racing	Chevrolet
11	Denny Hamlin	Joe Gibbs Racing	Toyota
13	Casey Mears	Germain Racing	Ford
14	Tony Stewart	Stewart–Haas Racing	Chevrolet
15	Clint Bowyer	Michael Waltrip Racing	Toyota
16	Greg Biffle	Roush Fenway Racing	Ford
17	Matt Kenseth	Roush Fenway Racing	Ford
18	Kyle Busch	Joe Gibbs Racing	Toyota
20	Joey Logano	Joe Gibbs Racing	Toyota
22	A. J. Allmendinger	Penske Racing	Dodge
23	Scott Riggs	R3 Motorsports	Chevrolet
24	Jeff Gordon	Hendrick Motorsports	Chevrolet
26	Josh Wise (R)	Front Row Motorsports	Ford
27	Paul Menard	Richard Childress Racing	Chevrolet
29	Kevin Harvick	Richard Childress Racing	Chevrolet
30	David Stremme	Inception Motorsports	Toyota
31	Jeff Burton	Richard Childress Racing	Chevrolet
32	Mike Bliss (i)	FAS Lane Racing	Ford
33	Brendan Gaughan	Richard Childress Racing	Chevrolet
34	David Ragan	Front Row Motorsports	Ford
36	Dave Blaney	Tommy Baldwin Racing	Chevrolet
37	Timmy Hill (R)	Max Q Motorsports	Ford
38	David Gilliland	Front Row Motorsports	Ford
39	Ryan Newman	Stewart–Haas Racing	Chevrolet
42	Juan Pablo Montoya	Earnhardt Ganassi Racing	Chevrolet
43	Aric Almirola	Richard Petty Motorsports	Ford
47	Bobby Labonte	JTG Daugherty Racing	Toyota
48	Jimmie Johnson	Hendrick Motorsports	Chevrolet
49	J. J. Yeley	Robinson-Blakeney Racing	Toyota
51	Kurt Busch	Phoenix Racing	Chevrolet
55	Mark Martin	Michael Waltrip Racing	Toyota
56	Martin Truex Jr.	Michael Waltrip Racing	Toyota
78	Regan Smith	Furniture Row Racing	Chevrolet
83	Landon Cassill	BK Racing	Toyota
87	Joe Nemechek (i)	NEMCO Motorsports	Toyota
88	Dale Earnhardt Jr.	Hendrick Motorsports	Chevrolet
93	Travis Kvapil	BK Racing	Toyota
98	Michael McDowell	Phil Parsons Racing	Ford
99	Carl Edwards	Roush Fenway Racing	Ford
Official entry list

== Results ==
=== Qualifying ===
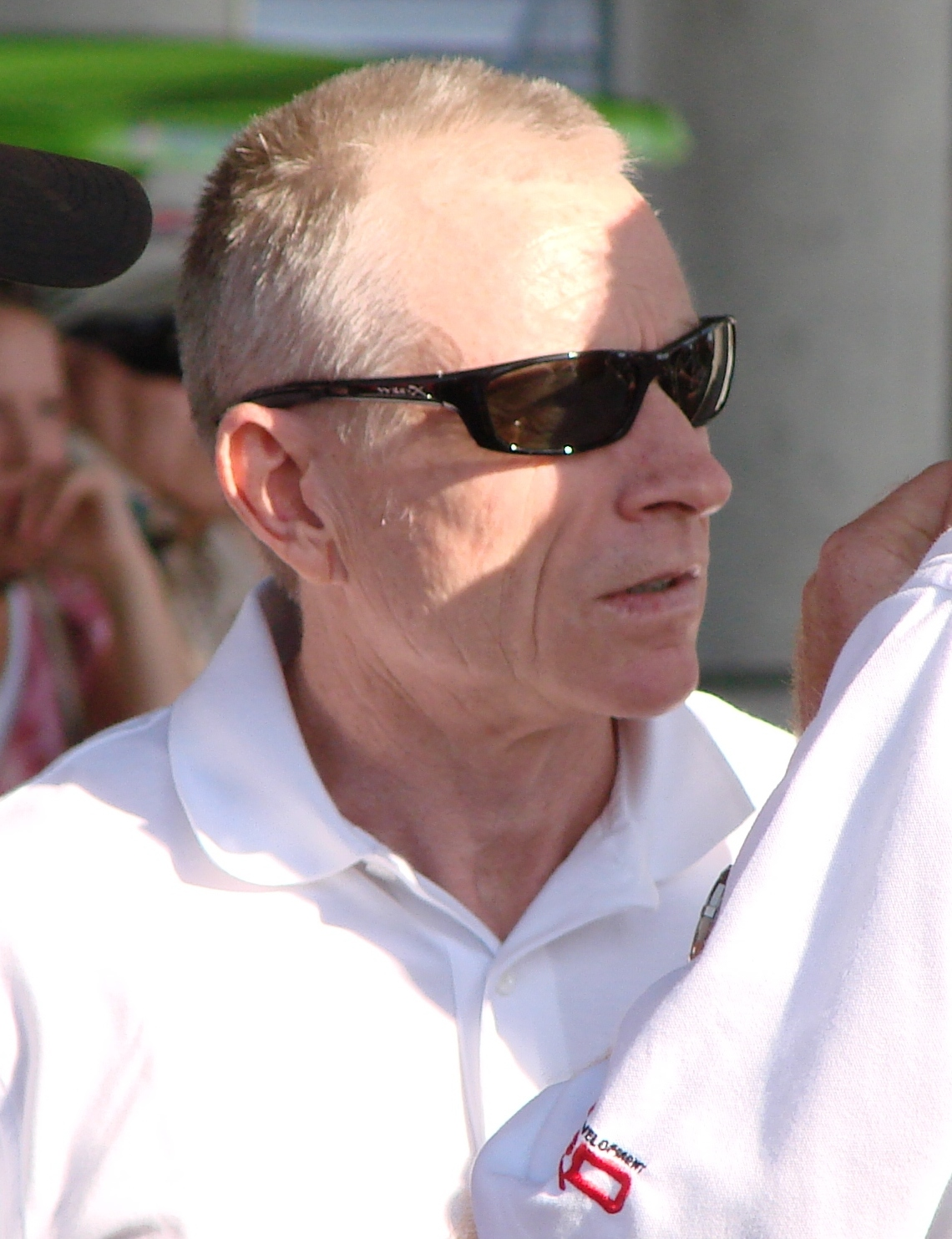
Mark Martin scored the pole position.

Grid	No	Driver	Team	Manufacturer	Time (in seconds)	Speed (in MPH)
1	55	Mark Martin	Michael Waltrip Racing	Toyota	26.313	136.814
2	14	Tony Stewart	Stewart–Haas Racing	Chevrolet	26.446	136.126
3	78	Regan Smith	Furniture Row Racing	Chevrolet	26.471	135.998
4	48	Jimmie Johnson	Hendrick Motorsports	Chevrolet	26.552	135.583
5	42	Juan Pablo Montoya	Earnhardt Ganassi Racing	Chevrolet	26.559	135.547
6	39	Ryan Newman	Stewart–Haas Racing	Chevrolet	26.570	135.491
7	16	Greg Biffle	Roush Fenway Racing	Ford	26.652	135.074
8	29	Kevin Harvick	Richard Childress Racing	Chevrolet	26.664	135.014
9	20	Joey Logano	Joe Gibbs Racing	Toyota	26.667	134.998
10	5	Kasey Kahne	Hendrick Motorsports	Chevrolet	26.712	134.771
11	31	Jeff Burton	Richard Childress Racing	Chevrolet	26.743	134.615
12	18	Kyle Busch	Joe Gibbs Racing	Toyota	26.753	134.564
13	11	Denny Hamlin	Joe Gibbs Racing	Toyota	26.766	134.499
14	9	Marcos Ambrose	Richard Petty Motorsports	Ford	26.776	134.449
15	22	A. J. Allmendinger	Penske Racing	Dodge	26.810	134.278
16	15	Clint Bowyer	Michael Waltrip Racing	Toyota	26.812	134.268
17	47	Bobby Labonte	JTG Daugherty Racing	Toyota	26.854	134.058
18	43	Aric Almirola	Richard Petty Motorsports	Ford	26.856	134.048
19	51	Kurt Busch	Phoenix Racing	Chevrolet	26.878	133.939
20	27	Paul Menard	Richard Childress Racing	Chevrolet	26.903	133.814
21	1	Jamie McMurray	Earnhardt Ganassi Racing	Chevrolet	26.913	133.764
22	83	Landon Cassill	BK Racing	Toyota	26.933	133.665
23	36	Dave Blaney	Tommy Baldwin Racing	Chevrolet	26.940	133.630
24	99	Carl Edwards	Roush Fenway Racing	Ford	26.943	133.615
25	56	Martin Truex Jr.	Michael Waltrip Racing	Toyota	26.983	133.417
26	17	Matt Kenseth	Roush Fenway Racing	Ford	27.094	132.871
27	23	Scott Riggs	R3 Motorsports	Chevrolet	27.120	132.743
28	2	Brad Keselowski	Penske Racing	Dodge	27.127	132.709
29	88	Dale Earnhardt Jr.	Hendrick Motorsports	Chevrolet	27.150	132.597
30	24	Jeff Gordon	Hendrick Motorsports	Chevrolet	27.182	132.441
31	13	Casey Mears	Germain Racing	Ford	27.221	132.251
32	10	David Reutimann	Tommy Baldwin Racing	Chevrolet	27.225	132.231
33	26	Josh Wise	Front Row Motorsports	Ford	27.256	132.081
34	34	David Ragan	Front Row Motorsports	Ford	27.261	132.057
35	49	J. J. Yeley	Robinson-Blakeney Racing	Toyota	27.338	131.685
36	38	David Gilliland	Front Row Motorsports	Ford	27.373	131.516
37	98	Michael McDowell	Phil Parsons Racing	Ford	27.376	131.502
38	87	Joe Nemechek	NEMCO Motorsports	Toyota	27.566	130.596
39	7	Robby Gordon	Robby Gordon Motorsports	Dodge	27.615	130.364
40	33	Brendan Gaughan	Richard Childress Racing	Chevrolet	27.945	128.824
41	93	Travis Kvapil	BK Racing	Toyota	28.159	127.845
42	32	Mike Bliss	FAS Lane Racing	Ford	30.493	118.060
43	30	David Stremme	Inception Motorsports	Toyota	27.887	129.092
Did not qualify
44	37	Timmy Hill	Rick Ware Racing/Max Q Motorsports	Ford	27.914	128.967

=== Race results ===
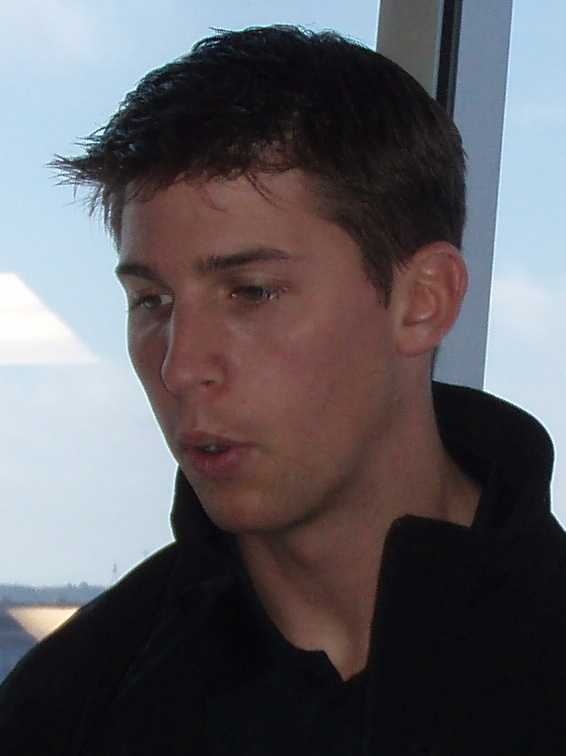
Denny Hamlin won the race.

Pos	No.	Driver	Team	Manufacturer	Laps Run	Points
1	11	Denny Hamlin	Joe Gibbs Racing	Toyota	312	47
2	29	Kevin Harvick	Richard Childress Racing	Chevrolet	312	44
3	16	Greg Biffle	Roush Fenway Racing	Ford	312	41
4	48	Jimmie Johnson	Hendrick Motorsports	Chevrolet	312	18
5	2	Brad Keselowski	Penske Racing	Dodge	312	40
6	18	Kyle Busch	Joe Gibbs Racing	Toyota	312	39
7	56	Martin Truex Jr.	Michael Waltrip Racing	Toyota	312	38
8	24	Jeff Gordon	Hendrick Motorsports	Chevrolet	312	37
9	55	Mark Martin	Michael Waltrip Racing	Toyota	312	36
10	20	Joey Logano	Joe Gibbs Racing	Toyota	312	34
11	42	Juan Pablo Montoya	Earnhardt Ganassi Racing	Chevrolet	312	33
12	43	Aric Almirola	Richard Petty Motorsports	Ford	312	32
13	17	Matt Kenseth	Roush Fenway Racing	Ford	312	32
14	88	Dale Earnhardt Jr.	Hendrick Motorsports	Chevrolet	312	30
15	51	Kurt Busch	Phoenix Racing	Chevrolet	312	30
16	47	Bobby Labonte	JTG Daugherty Racing	Toyota	312	28
17	99	Carl Edwards	Roush Fenway Racing	Ford	312	27
18	22	A. J. Allmendinger	Penske Racing	Dodge	311	26
19	93	Travis Kvapil	BK Racing	Toyota	311	25
20	78	Regan Smith	Furniture Row Racing	Chevrolet	311	24
21	39	Ryan Newman	Stewart–Haas Racing	Chevrolet	310	23
22	14	Tony Stewart	Stewart–Haas Racing	Chevrolet	310	23
23	36	Dave Blaney	Tommy Baldwin Racing	Chevrolet	309	21
24	32	Mike Bliss	FAS Lane Racing	Ford	309	-
25	34	David Ragan	Front Row Motorsports	Ford	309	20
26	49	J. J. Yeley	Robinson-Blakeney Racing	Toyota	309	18
27	33	Brendan Gaughan	Richard Childress Racing	Chevrolet	308	17
28	38	David Gilliland	Front Row Motorsports	Ford	308	16
29	30	David Stremme	Inception Motorsports	Toyota	306	15
30	15	Clint Bowyer	Michael Waltrip Racing	Toyota	306	14
31	27	Paul Menard	Richard Childress Racing	Chevrolet	303	13
32	9	Marcos Ambrose	Richard Petty Motorsports	Ford	295	12
33	31	Jeff Burton	Richard Childress Racing	Chevrolet	291	12
34	5	Kasey Kahne	Hendrick Motorsports	Chevrolet	274	10
35	83	Landon Cassill	BK Racing	Toyota	272	9
36	10	David Reutimann	Tommy Baldwin Racing	Chevrolet	248	8
37	1	Jamie McMurray	Earnhardt Ganassi Racing	Chevrolet	212	8
38	26	Josh Wise	Front Row Motorsports	Ford	110	6
39	13	Casey Mears	Germain Racing	Ford	109	5
40	87	Joe Nemechek	NEMCO Motorsports	Toyota	62	-
41	7	Robby Gordon	Robby Gordon Motorsports	Dodge	33	3
42	23	Scott Riggs	R3 Motorsports	Chevrolet	29	2
43	98	Michael McDowell	Phil Parsons Racing	Ford	8	1

== Standings after the race ==
Drivers' Championship standings

Pos	Driver	Points
1	Denny Hamlin	89
2	Greg Biffle	83
3	Kevin Harvick	81
4	Matt Kenseth	79
5	Dale Earnhardt Jr.	72

Manufacturers' Championship standings

Pos	Manufacturer	Wins	Points
1	Ford	1	13
2	Toyota	1	13
3	Chevrolet	0	12
4	Dodge	0	6

- Note: Only the top five positions are included for the driver standings.

Previous race: 2012 Daytona 500	Sprint Cup Series; 2012 season	Next race: 2012 Kobalt Tools 400
