= 2012 Pure Michigan 400 =

Race details
- Race 23 of 36 in the 2012 NASCAR Sprint Cup Series
- 2012 Pure Michigan 400 program cover
- Date: August 19, 2012
- Location: Michigan International Speedway in Brooklyn, Michigan
- Course: Permanent racing facility
- Course length: 2 miles (3.219 km)
- Distance: 201 laps, 402 mi (646.956 km)
- Scheduled distance: 200 laps, 400 mi (643.738 km)
- Weather: Clear with temperatures around 76 °F (24 °C); wind out of the W at 6 mph (9.7 km/h).
- Average speed: 144.662 miles per hour (232.811 km/h)

Pole position
Driver	Mark Martin	Michael Waltrip Racing
- Time: 36.053

Most laps led
Driver	Mark Martin	Michael Waltrip Racing
- Laps: 54

Winner
No. 16	Greg Biffle	Roush-Fenway Racing

Television in the United States
- Network: ESPN
- Announcers: Allen Bestwick, Dale Jarrett and Andy Petree
- Nielsen ratings: 3.8/5.2 million

The 2012 Pure Michigan 400 was a NASCAR Sprint Cup Series stock car race held on August 19, 2012, at Michigan International Speedway in Brooklyn, Michigan. Contested over 201 laps, it was the twenty-third race of the 2012 NASCAR Sprint Cup Series season. Greg Biffle of Roush Fenway Racing won the race, Brad Keselowski was second and Kasey Kahne finished third.

== Report ==
=== Background ===
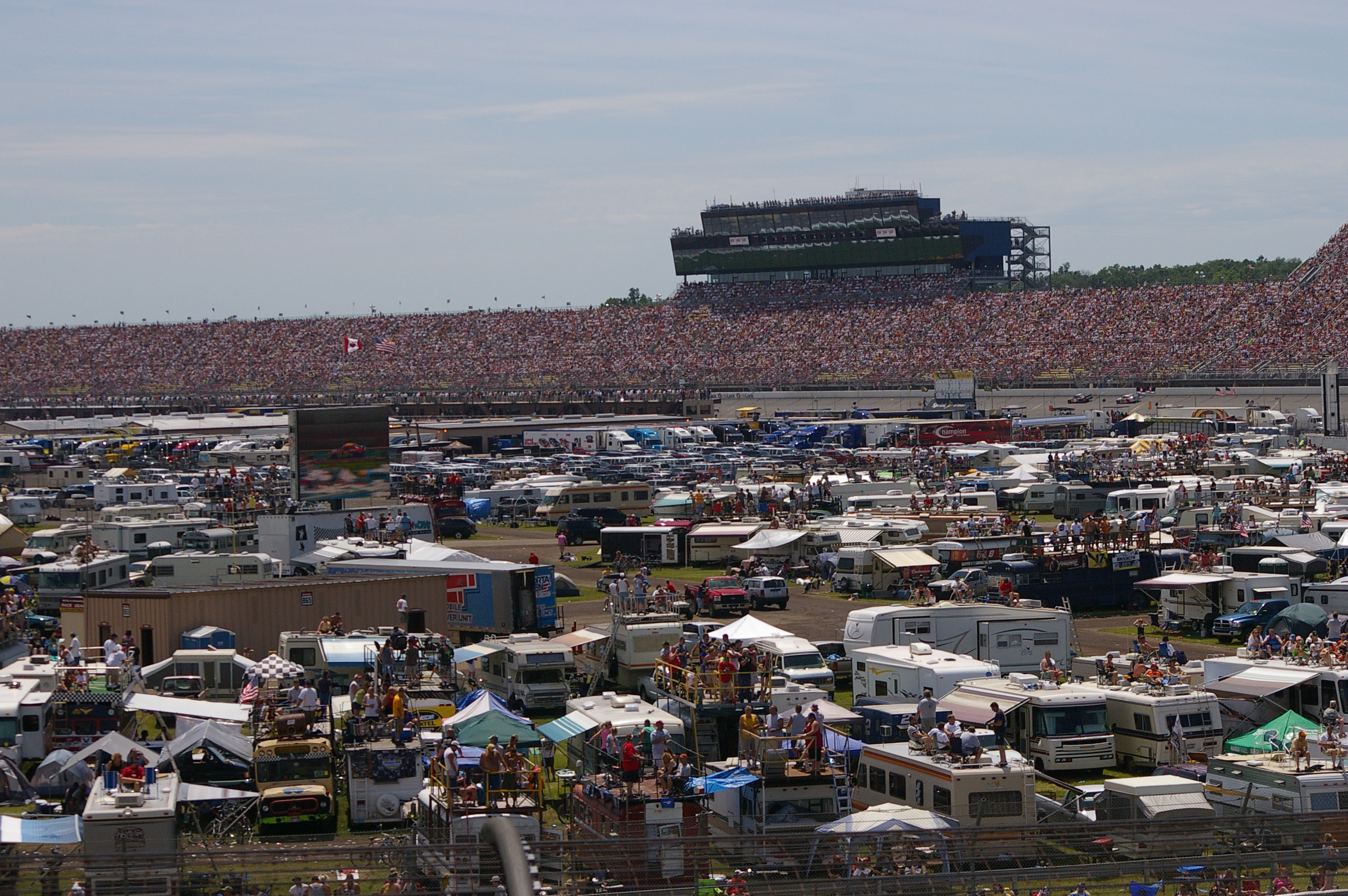
Michigan International Speedway, the race track where the race was held.

Michigan International Speedway is one of six superspeedways to hold NASCAR races; the others are Daytona International Speedway, Auto Club Speedway, Indianapolis Motor Speedway, Pocono Raceway and Talladega Superspeedway. The standard track at Michigan International Speedway is a four-turn superspeedway that is 2 miles (3.2 km) long. The track's turns are banked at eighteen degrees, while the front stretch, the location of the finish line, is banked at twelve degrees. The back stretch, has a five degree banking. Michigan International Speedway has a seating capacity of 137,243 people.

Before the race, Jimmie Johnson led the Drivers' Championship with 777 points, and Greg Biffle stood in second with 776. Matt Kenseth was third in the Drivers' Championship with 775 points, 15 ahead of Dale Earnhardt Jr. and 42 ahead of Brad Keselowski in fourth and fifth. Martin Truex Jr. with 728 was eleven points ahead of Clint Bowyer, as Tony Stewart with 716 points, was six ahead of Kevin Harvick, and 23 in front of Denny Hamlin. In the Manufacturers' Championship, Chevrolet was leading with 157 points, 32 ahead of Toyota. Ford, with 109 points, was 16 points ahead of Dodge in the battle for third.

=== Practice and qualifying ===
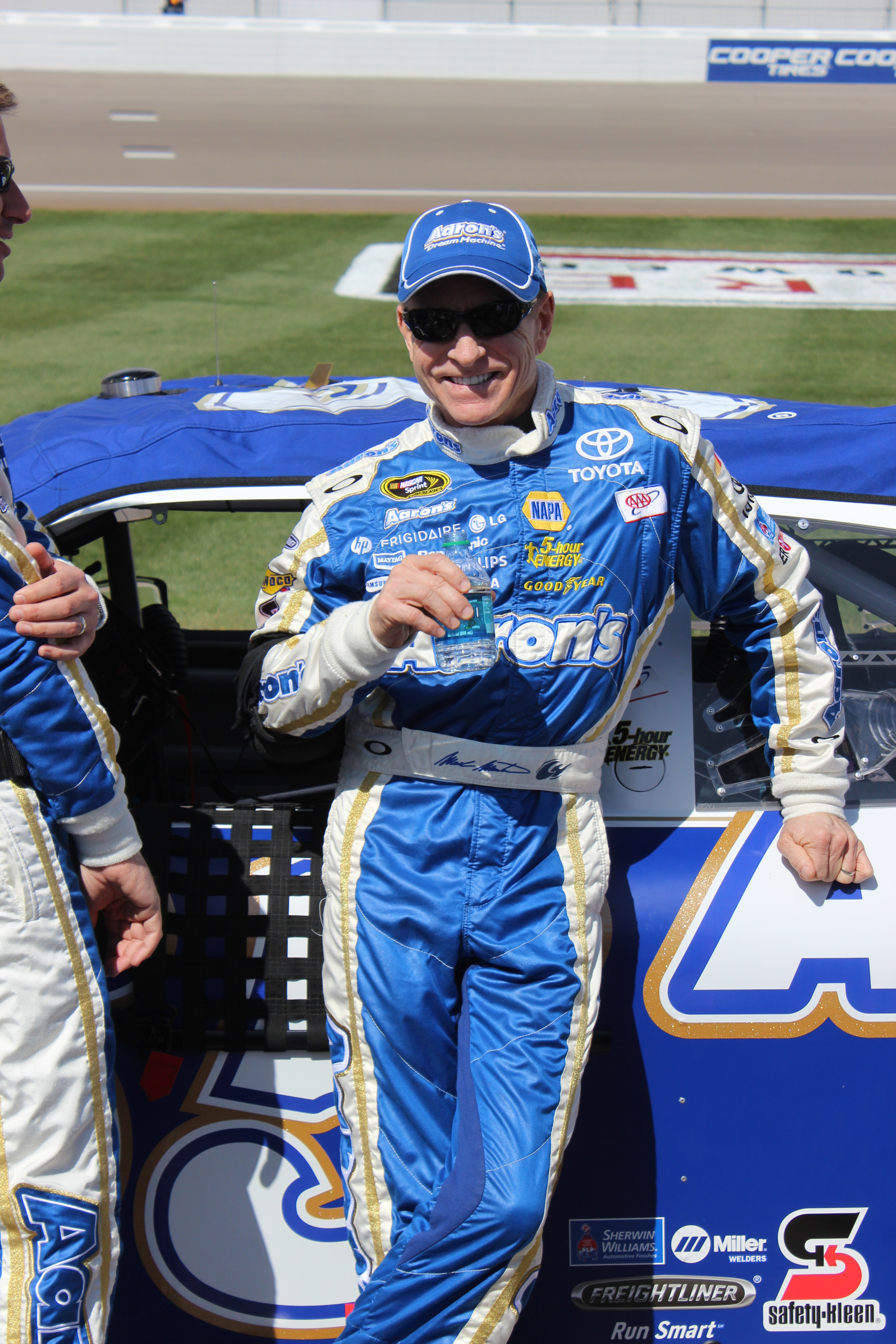
Mark Martin won the pole position

Three practice sessions will be held before the Sunday race—one on Friday, August 17, and two on Saturday, August 18. The first session lasted 90 minutes, while the second and third are scheduled for 55 minutes. Johnson was quickest with a time of 36.465 seconds in the first session, less than two-tenths of a second faster than Kasey Kahne. Mark Martin was just off Kahne's pace, followed by Harvick, Truex Jr., and Carl Edwards. Ryan Newman (who was battling the flu and wasn't sure he would be able to race; Stewart-Haas had David Reutimann on standby) was seventh, still within four-tenths of a second of Johnson's time.

Forty-five cars were entered for qualifying, but only forty-three could qualify for the race because of NASCAR's qualifying procedure. Martin clinched the 55th pole position of his career, with a time of 36.053 seconds. He was joined on the front row of the grid by Edwards. Johnson qualified third, Kenseth took fourth, and Kahne started fifth. Trevor Bayne, Truex Jr., Marcos Ambrose, Landon Cassill and Paul Menard rounded out the top ten. The two drivers that failed to qualify for the race were Stephen Leicht and J. J. Yeley. Once the qualifying session concluded, Martin said, "I've had a few years of practice. I don't need a whole bunch of practice. I need fast race cars. That's what Rodney Childers is giving me. All it is driving the car. I've been doing that since I was 15."

=== Race ===
After the drop of the green flag, Martin would jump out to an early lead. However, an early spin from David Gilliland through the grass on Lap 6 would bunch the field back up again. After restarting on Lap 10, Martin would once again easily retain the lead and build another substantial gap to the second place car. The first round of green flag pit stops would begin on Lap 35. Mixed strategies would see some teams taking two tires and others four. A number of drivers, notably Keselowski and Johnson, would stay out for a few laps longer than the rest of the field while stretching fuel mileage before the lead would cycle back to Martin on Lap 46.

Following a long green-flag run, Martin would continue to lead while having to deal with an ever-increasing amount of lapped traffic. On Lap 64, however, disaster would strike for Martin while coming up on the lapped cars of Bobby Labonte and Juan Pablo Montoya. Montoya would make contact with Labonte, turning him coming out of Turn 4. Martin, reacting to this, would spin out while attempting to avoid the two and begin to careen down pit road. After glancing off the inner pit wall, Martin's car would slam side-first into an exposed retaining wall at the garage opening midway down pit road. The exposed wall segment would penetrate deep into the car's side, puncturing the fuel tank, and causing fuel to spill around the car. The force of the impact would also cause several tires and other debris stationed on the wall to go flying back into the garage area. Luckily, track and safety officials were quick on the scene to extinguish any flames and no one, including Martin, suffered any injuries.

The race would restart on Lap 74 with Clint Bowyer taking a short-lived lead before another caution would fly after a crash from Regan Smith due to contact from Marcos Ambrose. Varying pit strategies and the timing of cautions would continue to mix the field up from its starting order. A fourth caution would come out after Joey Logano hit the wall after a tire failure from contact with Montoya. On the restart, Biffle would find himself near the front before soon fighting for the lead. He would take his first lead of the day on Lap 101 after passing Truex Jr. Biffle would hold the lead for 10 laps before pitting. Attrition and the long runs would also begin to take their toll as both Tony Stewart and Jeff Gordon would exit the race with engine failures. These engine failures, both being from in-house Hendrick Motorsports-built engines, would cause other teams running them to begin to worry about their own cars including Johnson.

The final fifty laps would be run mostly under green and would see a flurry of ten lead changes with only one driver, Johnson, leading more than ten consecutive laps during the final quarter of the race distance. Lap 182 would see the #21 car of Trevor Bayne sustain a tire failure and hit the wall in Turn 1, bringing out another caution and setting up a just over ten-lap sprint to the finish. The race would restart on lap 187 with Keselowski leading. He would hold the lead until being passed by Johnson with just under ten laps to go. Biffle would also get around Keselowski to move up into second.

Johnson, cruising to a seemingly assured win, would then suffer an engine failure (much like those of Stewart and Gordon) with only five laps to go. Oil spilling from Johnson's car would bring out the final caution and set-up a green-white-checkered finish. The final restart would lead to a final shootout between Biffle and Keselowski with Biffle edging out Keselowski to earn his third win at Michigan and his second of the season.

== Results ==
=== Qualifying ===
Grid	No.	Driver	Team	Manufacturer	Time (s)	Speed (mph)
1	55	Mark Martin	Michael Waltrip Racing	Toyota	36.053	199.706
2	99	Carl Edwards	Roush-Fenway Racing	Ford	36.249	198.626
3*	48	Jimmie Johnson	Hendrick Motorsports	Chevrolet	36.283	198.440
4	17	Matt Kenseth	Roush-Fenway Racing	Ford	36.330	198.183
5	5	Kasey Kahne	Hendrick Motorsports	Chevrolet	36.386	197.878
6	21	Trevor Bayne	Wood Brothers Racing	Ford	36.404	197.781
7	56	Martin Truex Jr.	Michael Waltrip Racing	Toyota	36.428	197.650
8	9	Marcos Ambrose	Richard Petty Motorsports	Ford	36.457	197.493
9	83	Landon Cassill	BK Racing	Toyota	36.468	197.433
10	27	Paul Menard	Richard Childress Racing	Chevrolet	36.518	197.163
11	24	Jeff Gordon	Hendrick Motorsports	Chevrolet	36.527	197.115
12	15	Clint Bowyer	Michael Waltrip Racing	Toyota	36.546	197.012
13	16	Greg Biffle	Roush-Fenway Racing	Ford	36.568	196.893
14	14	Tony Stewart	Stewart–Haas Racing	Chevrolet	36.571	196.887
15*	39	Ryan Newman	Stewart–Haas Racing	Chevrolet	36.598	196.732
16	20	Joey Logano	Joe Gibbs Racing	Toyota	36.641	196.501
17*	22	Sam Hornish Jr.	Penske Racing	Dodge	36.688	196.249
18	78	Regan Smith	Furniture Row Racing	Chevrolet	36.694	196.217
19	2	Brad Keselowski	Penske Racing	Dodge	36.701	196.180
20	29	Kevin Harvick	Richard Childress Racing	Chevrolet	36.725	196.052
21	11	Denny Hamlin	Joe Gibbs Racing	Toyota	36.743	195.956
22*	88	Dale Earnhardt Jr.	Hendrick Motorsports	Chevrolet	36.768	195.822
23	18	Kyle Busch	Joe Gibbs Racing	Toyota	37.248	193.299
24	1	Jamie McMurray	Earnhardt Ganassi Racing	Chevrolet	37.254	193.268
25	42	Juan Pablo Montoya	Earnhardt Ganassi Racing	Chevrolet	37.279	193.138
26	51	Kurt Busch	Phoenix Racing	Chevrolet	37.308	192.988
27	91	Reed Sorenson	Humphrey Smith Racing	Ford	37.362	192.709
28	47	Bobby Labonte	JTG Daugherty Racing	Toyota	37.384	192.596
29	13	Casey Mears	Germain Racing	Ford	37.391	192.560
30	93	Travis Kvapil	BK Racing	Toyota	37.395	192.539
31	30	David Stremme	Inception Motorsports	Toyota	37.430	192.359
32	31	Jeff Burton	Richard Childress Racing	Chevrolet	37.445	192.282
33	19	Jason Leffler	Humphrey Smith Racing	Ford	37.460	192.205
34	26	Josh Wise	Front Row Motorsports	Ford	37.465	192.179
35	87	Joe Nemechek	NEMCO Motorsports	Toyota	37.477	192.118
36	38	David Gilliland	Front Row Motorsports	Ford	37.541	191.790
37	34	David Ragan	Front Row Motorsports	Ford	37.554	191.724
38	23	Scott Riggs	R3 Motorsports	Chevrolet	37.906	189.943
39	10	David Reutimann	Tommy Baldwin Racing	Chevrolet	38.088	189.036
40	32	T. J. Bell	FAS Lane Racing	Ford	38.894	185.118
41	43	Aric Almirola	Richard Petty Motorsports	Ford	—	—
42	36	Dave Blaney	Front Row Motorsports	Chevrolet	—	—
43	98	Mike Skinner	Phil Parsons Racing	Ford	37.907	189.939
Failed to Qualify
	33	Stephen Leicht	Circle Sport Racing	Chevrolet	38.006	189.444
	37	J. J. Yeley	Max Q Motorsports	Chevrolet	38.266	188.157

- Jimmie Johnson will start from the rear of the field for changing an engine.
- Ryan Newman will start from the rear of the field for having a back-up driver.
- Sam Hornish Jr. will start from the rear of the field for having a back-up driver qualify the car.
- Dale Earnhardt Jr. will start from the rear of the field for switching to a back-up car.

=== Race results ===
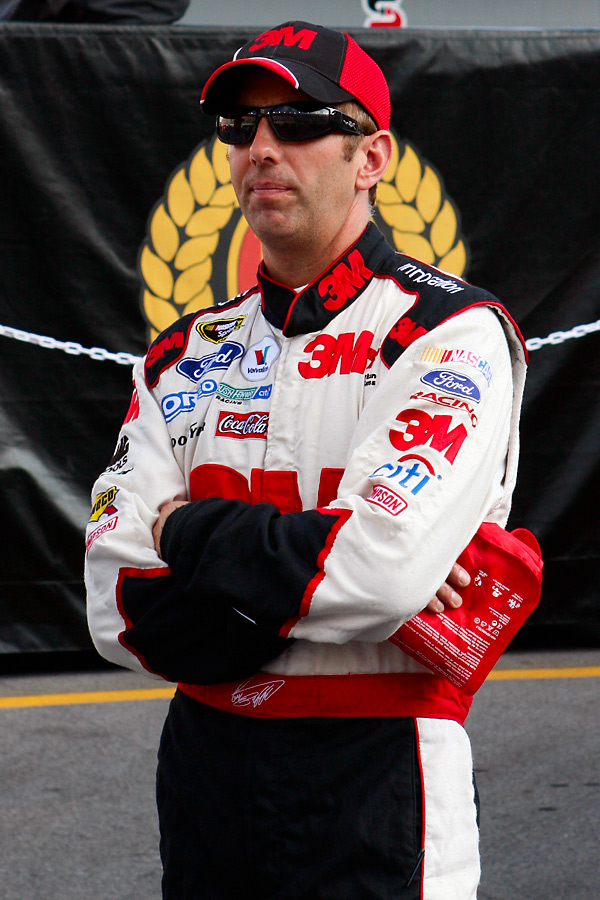
Greg Biffle won the race.

Pos	Car	Driver	Team	Manufacturer	Laps Run	Points
1	16	Greg Biffle	Roush-Fenway Racing	Ford	201	47
2	2	Brad Keselowski	Penske Racing	Dodge	201	43
3	5	Kasey Kahne	Hendrick Motorsports	Chevrolet	201	41
4	88	Dale Earnhardt Jr.	Hendrick Motorsports	Chevrolet	201	41
5	9	Marcos Ambrose	Richard Petty Motorsports	Ford	201	39
6	99	Carl Edwards	Roush-Fenway Racing	Ford	201	39
7	15	Clint Bowyer	Michael Waltrip Racing	Toyota	201	38
8	39	Ryan Newman	Stewart–Haas Racing	Chevrolet	201	36
9	27	Paul Menard	Richard Childress Racing	Chevrolet	201	36
10	56	Martin Truex Jr.	Michael Waltrip Racing	Toyota	201	35
11	11	Denny Hamlin	Joe Gibbs Racing	Toyota	201	34
12	22	Sam Hornish Jr.	Penske Racing	Dodge	201	0
13	18	Kyle Busch	Joe Gibbs Racing	Toyota	201	31
14	1	Jamie McMurray	Earnhardt Ganassi Racing	Chevrolet	201	30
15	93	Travis Kvapil	BK Racing	Toyota	201	29
16	29	Kevin Harvick	Richard Childress Racing	Chevrolet	201	28
17	17	Matt Kenseth	Roush-Fenway Racing	Ford	201	28
18	38	David Gilliland	Front Row Motorsports	Ford	201	26
19	31	Jeff Burton	Richard Childress Racing	Chevrolet	201	25
20	43	Aric Almirola	Richard Petty Motorsports	Ford	201	24
21	10	David Reutimann	Tommy Baldwin Racing	Toyota	200	23
22	47	Bobby Labonte	JTG Daugherty Racing	Toyota	199	22
23	34	David Ragan	Front Row Motorsports	Ford	199	21
24	21	Trevor Bayne	Wood Brothers Racing	Ford	199	0
25	83	Landon Cassill	BK Racing	Toyota	198	20
26	42	Juan Pablo Montoya	Earnhardt Ganassi Racing	Chevrolet	197	18
27	48	Jimmie Johnson	Hendrick Motorsports	Chevrolet	195	18
28	24	Jeff Gordon	Hendrick Motorsports	Chevrolet	167	16
29	78	Regan Smith	Furniture Row Racing	Chevrolet	154	15
30	51	Kurt Busch	Phoenix Racing	Chevrolet	135	14
31	20	Joey Logano	Joe Gibbs Racing	Toyota	132	13
32	14	Tony Stewart	Stewart–Haas Racing	Chevrolet	109	12
33	32	T. J. Bell	FAS Lane Racing	Ford	108	11
34	30	David Stremme	Inception Motorsports	Toyota	72	10
35	55	Mark Martin	Michael Waltrip Racing	Toyota	64	11
36	87	Joe Nemechek	NEMCO Motorsports	Toyota	38	0
37	13	Casey Mears	Germain Racing	Ford	36	7
38	36	Dave Blaney	Tommy Baldwin Racing	Chevrolet	34	6
39	98	Mike Skinner	Phil Parsons Racing	Ford	25	5
40	26	Josh Wise	Front Row Motorsports	Ford	24	4
41	23	Scott Riggs	R3 Motorsports	Chevrolet	20	3
42	91	Reed Sorenson	Humphrey Smith Racing	Ford	15	0
43	19	Jason Leffler	Humphrey Smith Racing	Ford	14	0

== Standings after the race ==
Drivers' Championship standings

Pos	Driver	Points
1	Greg Biffle	823
2	Matt Kenseth	803
3	Dale Earnhardt Jr.	801
4	Jimmie Johnson	795
5	Brad Keselowski	776

Manufacturers' Championship standings

Pos	Manufacturer	Points
1	Chevrolet	161
2	Toyota	128
3	Ford	118
4	Dodge	99

- Note: Only the top five positions are included for the driver standings.

Previous race: 2012 Finger Lakes 355 at The Glen	Sprint Cup Series; 2012 season	Next race: 2012 Irwin Tools Night Race
