= 2012 Lenox Industrial Tools 301 =

Race details
- Race 19 of 36 in the 2012 NASCAR Sprint Cup Series
- Date: July 15, 2012
- Official name: Lenox Industrial Tools 301 The Extra Mile
- Location: New Hampshire Motor Speedway in Loudon, New Hampshire
- Course: Permanent racing facility
- Course length: 1.058 miles (1.703 km)
- Distance: 301 laps, 318.458 mi (512.508 km)
- Weather: Overcast with a temperature around 87 °F (31 °C); wind out of the SW at 6 mph (9.7 km/h).
- Average speed: 116.226 miles per hour (187.048 km/h)

Pole position
Driver	Kyle Busch	Joe Gibbs Racing
- Time: 28.548

Most laps led
Driver	Denny Hamlin	Joe Gibbs Racing
- Laps: 152

Winner
No. 5	Kasey Kahne	Hendrick Motorsports

Television in the United States
- Network: TNT
- Announcers: Adam Alexander, Wally Dallenbach Jr. and Kyle Petty
- Nielsen ratings: 4.775 million

The 2012 Lenox Industrial Tools 301 was a NASCAR Sprint Cup Series race held on July 15, 2012 at New Hampshire Motor Speedway in Loudon, New Hampshire, United States. Contested over 301 laps, it was the nineteenth race of the 2012 NASCAR Sprint Cup Series season. Kasey Kahne of Hendrick Motorsports took his second win of the season, while Denny Hamlin finished second and Clint Bowyer finished third.

== Report ==
=== Background ===
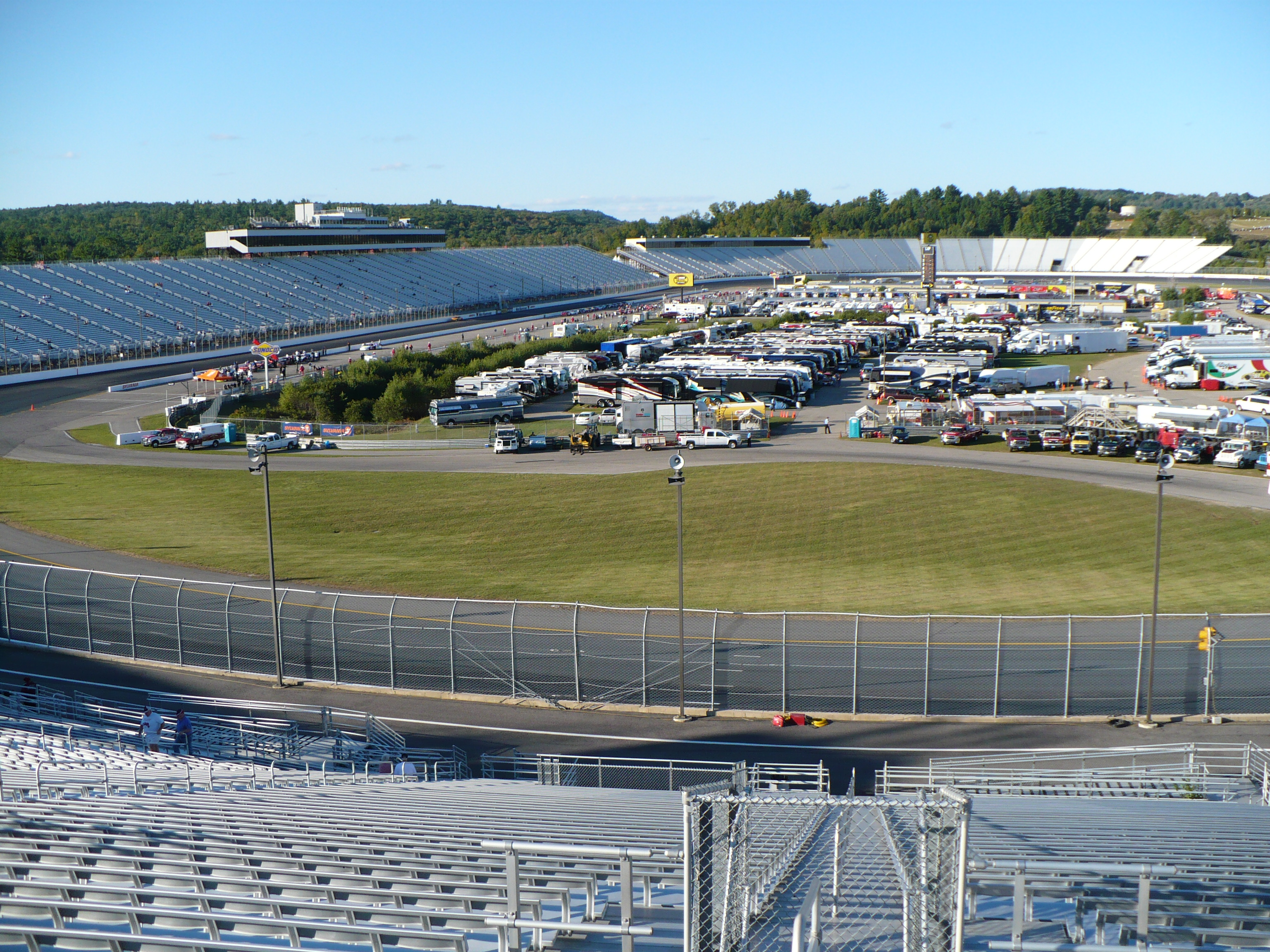
New Hampshire Motor Speedway, the race track where the race was held.

New Hampshire Motor Speedway is one of ten intermediate tracks to hold NASCAR races. The standard track at New Hampshire Motor Speedway is a four-turn oval track, 1.6 miles (2.6 km) long. The track's turns are banked from two to seven degrees, while the front stretch, the finish line, and the back stretch are banked at one degree.

Before the race, Matt Kenseth led the Drivers' Championship with 676 points, and Dale Earnhardt Jr. stood in second with 651. Greg Biffle was third in the Drivers' Championship with 632, fourteen points ahead of Jimmie Johnson and forty ahead of Tony Stewart in fourth and fifth. Kevin Harvick, with 586, was two points ahead of Denny Hamlin, as Martin Truex Jr. with 584 points, was eleven ahead of Brad Keselowski and twelve in front of Clint Bowyer. In the Manufacturers' Championship, Chevrolet was leading with 126 points, twenty-two points ahead of Toyota. Ford, with 90 points, was fourteen points ahead of Dodge in the battle for third. Ryan Newman is the defending race winner after winning the event in 2011.

Shortly before the 2012 Coke Zero 400, held one week earlier, NASCAR announced that A. J. Allmendinger failed a random drug test held on June 29, 2012, and that he was suspended temporarily, depending on the result of his second test. Afterward, Penske Racing announced that Sam Hornish Jr., who replaced him in the Coke Zero 400, would also replace him for a second consecutive week.

=== Practice and qualifying ===
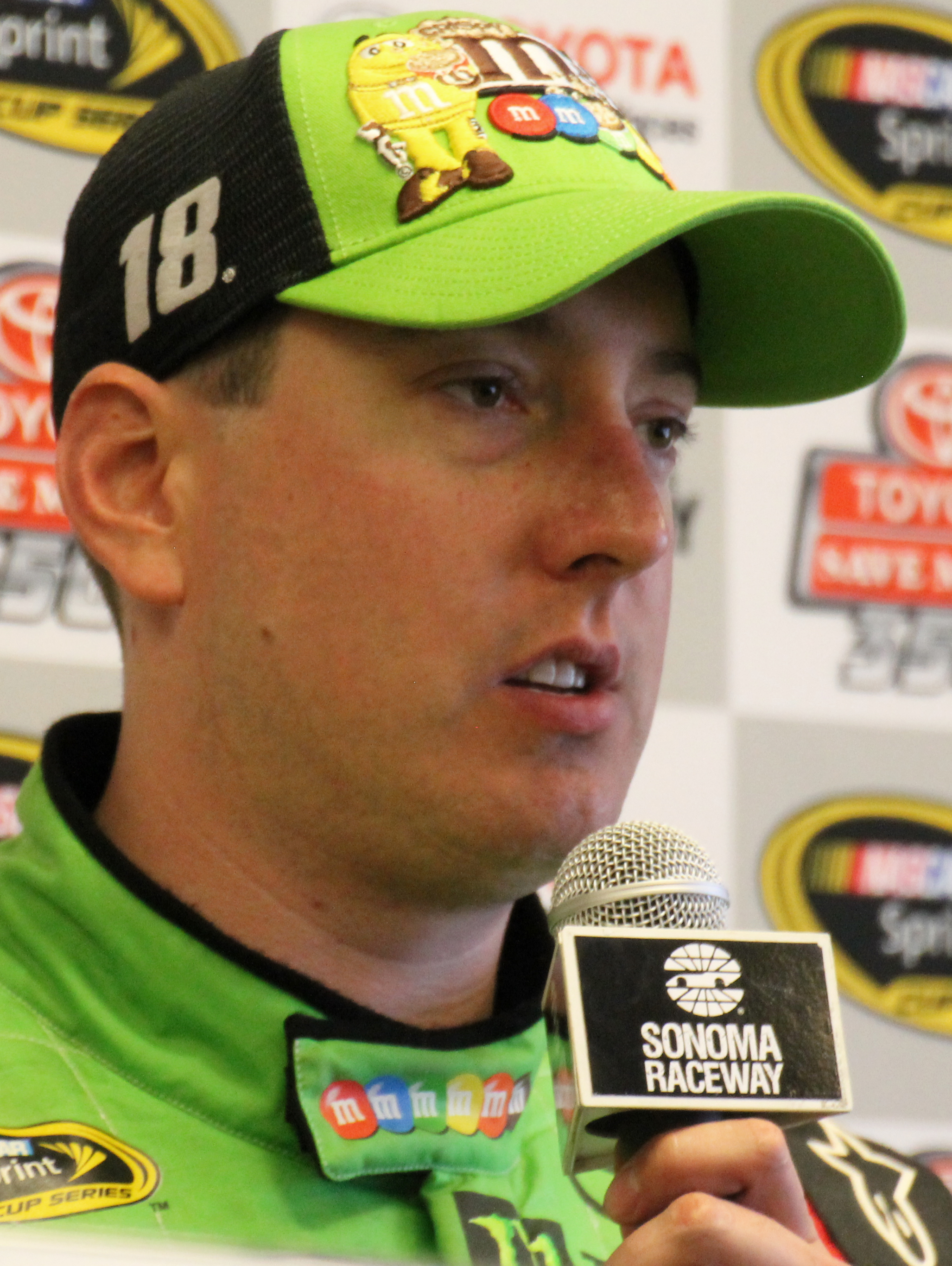
Kyle Busch (pictured in 2015), of the Joe Gibbs Racing team won the pole position.

Three practice sessions were held before the Sunday race—one on Friday, July 13, and two on Saturday, July 14. The first session lasted 90 minutes, and the second was 55 minutes. The third and final session was 60 minutes. Kyle Busch was quickest with a time of 28.555 seconds in the first session, less than one tenth of a second faster than Biffle. Kurt Busch was just off Biffle's pace, followed by Kasey Kahne, Paul Menard, and Truex Jr.. Brian Vickers was seventh, still within two tenths of a second of Kyle Busch's time.

Forty-four cars were entered for qualifying, but only forty-three could qualify for the race because of NASCAR's qualifying procedure. Kyle Busch clinched the ninth pole position of his career, with a time of 28.548 seconds. He was joined on the front row of the grid by Kahne. Hamlin qualified third, Truex Jr. took fourth, and Bowyer started fifth. Newman, Johnson, Jeff Gordon, Earnhardt Jr. and Stewart rounded out the top ten. The driver that failed to qualify for the race was Mike Bliss. Once the qualifying session concluded, Kyle Busch expressed his happiness with qualifying: "Excellent lap, just tried to hit the same marks in practice. Haven't found the magic way to get around the Magic Mile but today we did."

In the second practice session, Hamlin was quickest with a time of 28.969 seconds. Gordon, with a time of 28.993, was second-quickest, ahead of Truex Jr., Aric Almirola, and Bowyer. Kahne, Johnson, Kyle Busch, Vickers, and Jeff Burton completed the first ten positions. Hamlin continued to be quickest through the third practice session with a time of 28.990, 0.009 seconds faster than his fastest lap during the second session. Kyle Busch was second-quickest in the session, while Keselowski was scored third. Bowyer followed in the fourth position ahead of Johnson, Vickers and Truex Jr. Kahne, Logano and Carl Edwards rounded out the first ten positions in eighth, ninth and tenth, respectively.

=== Race ===
The race, the nineteenth in the season, began with Kyle Busch on the Pole and Kasey Kahne starting second, not much happened here but three cautions, two for debris and one for David Reutimann's blown engine, Kyle Busch, the races polesitter had a speeding penalty which would cause him to finish 16th, Kasey Kahne won the race on lap 301 of a scheduled 301.

== Results ==
=== Qualifying ===
Grid	No.	Driver	Team	Manufacturer	Time (s)	Speed (mph)
1	18	Kyle Busch	Joe Gibbs Racing	Toyota	28.548	133.417
2	5	Kasey Kahne	Hendrick Motorsports	Chevrolet	28.551	133.403
3	11	Denny Hamlin	Joe Gibbs Racing	Toyota	28.552	133.399
4	56	Martin Truex Jr.	Michael Waltrip Racing	Toyota	28.565	133.338
5	15	Clint Bowyer	Michael Waltrip Racing	Toyota	28.569	133.319
6	39	Ryan Newman	Stewart–Haas Racing	Chevrolet	28.578	133.277
7	48	Jimmie Johnson	Hendrick Motorsports	Chevrolet	28.583	133.254
8	24	Jeff Gordon	Hendrick Motorsports	Chevrolet	28.595	133.198
9	88	Dale Earnhardt Jr.	Hendrick Motorsports	Chevrolet	28.628	133.045
10	14	Tony Stewart	Stewart–Haas Racing	Chevrolet	28.651	132.938
11	16	Greg Biffle	Roush Fenway Racing	Ford	28.665	132.873
12	29	Kevin Harvick	Richard Childress Racing	Chevrolet	28.666	132.868
13	27	Paul Menard	Richard Childress Racing	Chevrolet	28.730	132.572
14	51	Kurt Busch	Phoenix Racing	Chevrolet	28.735	132.549
15	55	Brian Vickers	Michael Waltrip Racing	Toyota	28.762	132.425
16	20	Joey Logano	Joe Gibbs Racing	Toyota	28.762	132.425
17	78	Regan Smith	Furniture Row Racing	Chevrolet	28.769	132.393
18	47	Bobby Labonte	JTG Daugherty Racing	Toyota	28.782	132.333
19	34	David Ragan	Front Row Motorsports	Ford	28.797	132.264
20	9	Marcos Ambrose	Richard Petty Motorsports	Ford	28.811	132.200
21	99	Carl Edwards	Roush Fenway Racing	Ford	28.814	132.186
22	2	Brad Keselowski	Penske Racing	Dodge	28.836	132.085
23	43	Aric Almirola	Richard Petty Motorsports	Ford	28.891	131.833
24	22	Sam Hornish Jr.	Penske Racing	Dodge	28.952	131.556
25	31	Jeff Burton	Richard Childress Racing	Chevrolet	28.972	131.465
26	10	David Reutimann	Tommy Baldwin Racing	Chevrolet	29.016	131.266
27	17	Matt Kenseth	Roush Fenway Racing	Ford	29.023	131.234
28	1	Jamie McMurray	Earnhardt Ganassi Racing	Chevrolet	29.023	131.234
29	83	Landon Cassill	BK Racing	Toyota	29.034	131.184
30	93	Travis Kvapil	BK Racing	Toyota	29.112	130.833
31	42	Juan Pablo Montoya	Earnhardt Ganassi Racing	Chevrolet	29.150	130.662
32	26	Josh Wise	Front Row Motorsports	Ford	29.267	130.140
33	13	Casey Mears	Germain Racing	Ford	29.336	129.834
34	87	Joe Nemechek	NEMCO Motorsports	Toyota	29.342	129.807
35	36	Dave Blaney	Tommy Baldwin Racing	Chevrolet	29.371	129.679
36	98	Michael McDowell	Phil Parsons Racing	Ford	29.406	129.525
37	32	Ken Schrader	FAS Lane Racing	Ford	29.453	129.318
38	49	J. J. Yeley	Robinson-Blakeney Racing	Toyota	29.463	129.274
39	38	David Gilliland	Front Row Motorsports	Ford	29.490	129.156
40	30	David Stremme	Inception Motorsports	Toyota	29.504	129.094
41	23	Scott Riggs	R3 Motorsports	Toyota	29.557	128.863
42	79	Kelly Bires	Go Green Racing	Ford	29.637	128.515
43	33	Stephen Leicht	Circle Sport Racing	Chevrolet	29.714	128.182
Failed to Qualify
	19	Mike Bliss	Humphrey Smith Racing	Toyota	29.740	128.070

=== Race results ===
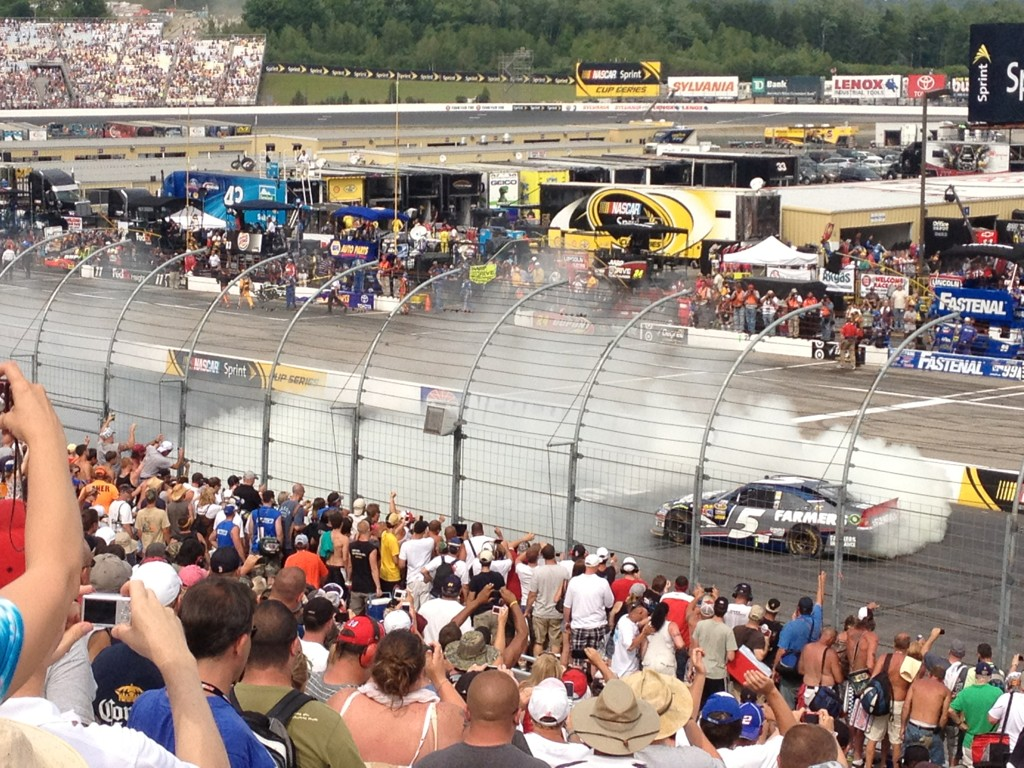
Kasey Kahne won the race.

Pos	Car	Driver	Team	Manufacturer	Laps	Points
1	5	Kasey Kahne	Hendrick Motorsports	Chevrolet	301	47
2	11	Denny Hamlin	Joe Gibbs Racing	Toyota	301	44
3	15	Clint Bowyer	Michael Waltrip Racing	Toyota	301	42
4	88	Dale Earnhardt Jr.	Hendrick Motorsports	Chevrolet	301	40
5	2	Brad Keselowski	Penske Racing	Dodge	301	39
6	24	Jeff Gordon	Hendrick Motorsports	Chevrolet	301	39
7	48	Jimmie Johnson	Hendrick Motorsports	Chevrolet	301	38
8	29	Kevin Harvick	Richard Childress Racing	Chevrolet	301	36
9	16	Greg Biffle	Roush-Fenway Racing	Ford	301	35
10	39	Ryan Newman	Stewart–Haas Racing	Chevrolet	301	34
11	56	Martin Truex Jr.	Michael Waltrip Racing	Toyota	301	33
12	14	Tony Stewart	Stewart–Haas Racing	Chevrolet	301	32
13	17	Matt Kenseth	Roush-Fenway Racing	Ford	301	31
14	20	Joey Logano	Joe Gibbs Racing	Toyota	301	30
15	55	Brian Vickers	Michael Waltrip Racing	Toyota	301	0
16	18	Kyle Busch	Joe Gibbs Racing	Toyota	301	29
17	27	Paul Menard	Richard Childress Racing	Chevrolet	301	27
18	99	Carl Edwards	Roush-Fenway Racing	Ford	301	26
19	9	Marcos Ambrose	Richard Petty Motorsports	Ford	301	25
20	1	Jamie McMurray	Earnhardt Ganassi Racing	Chevrolet	301	24
21	31	Jeff Burton	Richard Childress Racing	Chevrolet	301	23
22	22	Sam Hornish Jr.	Penske Racing	Dodge	301	22
23	47	Bobby Labonte	JTG Daugherty Racing	Toyota	301	21
24	51	Kurt Busch	Phoenix Racing	Chevrolet	299	21
25	42	Juan Pablo Montoya	Earnhardt Ganassi Racing	Chevrolet	299	19
26	78	Regan Smith	Furniture Row Racing	Chevrolet	298	18
27	38	David Gilliland	Front Row Motorsports	Ford	298	17
28	43	Aric Almirola	Richard Petty Motorsports	Ford	298	16
29	83	Landon Cassill	BK Racing	Toyota	297	15
30	93	Travis Kvapil	BK Racing	Toyota	297	14
31	32	Ken Schrader	FAS Lane Racing	Ford	294	13
32	33	Stephen Leicht	Circle Sport Racing	Chevrolet	293	12
33	10	David Reutimann	Tommy Baldwin Racing	Chevrolet	229	11
34	34	David Ragan	Front Row Motorsports	Ford	139	10
35	33	David Stremme	Inception Motorsports	Toyota	101	9
36	13	Casey Mears	Germain Racing	Toyota	91	8
37	26	Josh Wise	Front Row Motorsports	Ford	82	7
38	87	Joe Nemechek	NEMCO Motorsports	Toyota	71	0
39	36	Dave Blaney	Tommy Baldwin Racing	Chevrolet	68	5
40	98	Michael McDowell	Phil Parsons Racing	Ford	63	4
41	23	Scott Riggs	R3 Motorsports	Chevrolet	32	3
42	79	Kelly Bires	Go Green Racing	Ford	19	2
43	49	J. J. Yeley	Robinson-Blakeney Racing	Toyota	4	1

== Standings after the race ==
Drivers' Championship standings

Pos	Driver	Points
1	Matt Kenseth	707
2	Dale Earnhardt Jr.	691
3	Greg Biffle	667
4	Jimmie Johnson	656
5	Denny Hamlin	628

Manufacturers' Championship standings

Pos	Manufacturer	Points
1	Chevrolet	135
2	Toyota	110
3	Ford	93
4	Dodge	80

- Note: Only the top five positions are included for the driver standings.

Previous race: 2012 Coke Zero 400	Sprint Cup Series; 2012 season	Next race: 2012 Brickyard 400
