= 2012 Kobalt Tools 400 =

Race details
- Race 3 of 36 in the 2012 NASCAR Sprint Cup Series
- Date: March 11, 2012
- Location: Las Vegas Motor Speedway in Clark County, Nevada
- Course: Permanent racing facility
- Course length: 1.5 miles (2.4 km)
- Distance: 267 laps, 400.5 mi (644.542 km)
- Weather: Partly cloudy with a high around 73; wind out of the S at 7 mph.

Pole position
Driver	Kasey Kahne	Hendrick Motorsports
- Time: 28.353

Most laps led
Driver	Tony Stewart	Stewart–Haas Racing
- Laps: 127

Winner
No. 14	Tony Stewart	Stewart–Haas Racing

Television in the United States
- Network: Fox
- Announcers: Mike Joy, Darrell Waltrip and Larry McReynolds

The 2012 Kobalt Tools 400 was a NASCAR Sprint Cup Series stock car race that was held on March 11, 2012 at Las Vegas Motor Speedway in Las Vegas, Nevada. Contested over 267 laps, it was the third race of the 2012 season. The race was won by Tony Stewart for the Stewart–Haas Racing team. Jimmie Johnson finished second, and Greg Biffle clinched third.

== Report ==
=== Entry list ===
(R) - Denotes rookie driver.

(i) - Denotes driver who is ineligible for series driver points.

No.	Driver	Team	Manufacturer
1	Jamie McMurray	Earnhardt Ganassi Racing	Chevrolet
2	Brad Keselowski	Penske Racing	Dodge
5	Kasey Kahne	Hendrick Motorsports	Chevrolet
7	Robby Gordon	Robby Gordon Motorsports	Dodge
9	Marcos Ambrose	Richard Petty Motorsports	Ford
10	David Reutimann	Tommy Baldwin Racing	Chevrolet
11	Denny Hamlin	Joe Gibbs Racing	Toyota
13	Casey Mears	Germain Racing	Ford
14	Tony Stewart	Stewart–Haas Racing	Chevrolet
15	Clint Bowyer	Michael Waltrip Racing	Toyota
16	Greg Biffle	Roush Fenway Racing	Ford
17	Matt Kenseth	Roush Fenway Racing	Ford
18	Kyle Busch	Joe Gibbs Racing	Toyota
20	Joey Logano	Joe Gibbs Racing	Toyota
21	Trevor Bayne (i)	Wood Brothers Racing	Ford
22	A. J. Allmendinger	Penske Racing	Dodge
23	Scott Riggs	R3 Motorsports	Chevrolet
24	Jeff Gordon	Hendrick Motorsports	Chevrolet
26	Josh Wise (R)	Front Row Motorsports	Ford
27	Paul Menard	Richard Childress Racing	Chevrolet
29	Kevin Harvick	Richard Childress Racing	Chevrolet
30	David Stremme	Inception Motorsports	Toyota
31	Jeff Burton	Richard Childress Racing	Chevrolet
32	Ken Schrader	FAS Lane Racing	Ford
33	Brendan Gaughan	Richard Childress Racing	Chevrolet
34	David Ragan	Front Row Motorsports	Ford
36	Dave Blaney	Tommy Baldwin Racing	Chevrolet
37	Timmy Hill (R)	Max Q Motorsports	Ford
38	David Gilliland	Front Row Motorsports	Ford
39	Ryan Newman	Stewart–Haas Racing	Chevrolet
42	Juan Pablo Montoya	Earnhardt Ganassi Racing	Chevrolet
43	Aric Almirola	Richard Petty Motorsports	Ford
47	Bobby Labonte	JTG Daugherty Racing	Toyota
48	Jimmie Johnson	Hendrick Motorsports	Chevrolet
49	J. J. Yeley	Robinson-Blakeney Racing	Toyota
51	Kurt Busch	Phoenix Racing	Chevrolet
55	Mark Martin	Michael Waltrip Racing	Toyota
56	Martin Truex Jr.	Michael Waltrip Racing	Toyota
78	Regan Smith	Furniture Row Racing	Chevrolet
83	Landon Cassill	BK Racing	Toyota
87	Joe Nemechek (i)	NEMCO Motorsports	Toyota
88	Dale Earnhardt Jr.	Hendrick Motorsports	Chevrolet
93	Travis Kvapil	BK Racing	Toyota
98	Michael McDowell	Phil Parsons Racing	Ford
99	Carl Edwards	Roush Fenway Racing	Ford
Official entry list

== Results ==
=== Qualifying ===
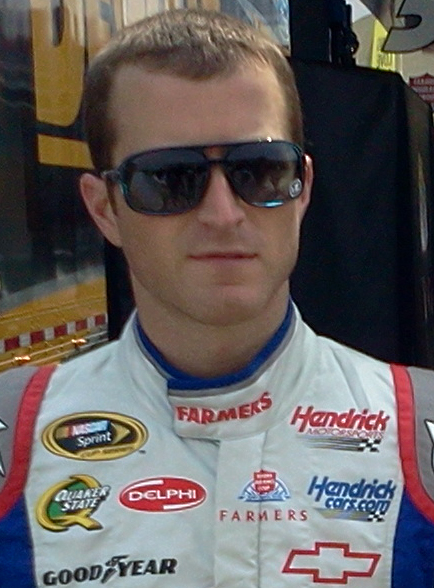
Kasey Kahne scored the pole position.

Grid	No.	Driver	Team	Manufacturer	Time	Speed
1	5	Kasey Kahne	Hendrick Motorsports	Chevrolet	28.353	190.456
2^{1}	18	Kyle Busch	Joe Gibbs Racing	Toyota	28.415	190.040
3	29	Kevin Harvick	Richard Childress Racing	Chevrolet	28.419	190.014
4	88	Dale Earnhardt Jr.	Hendrick Motorsports	Chevrolet	28.440	189.873
5	15	Clint Bowyer	Michael Waltrip Racing	Toyota	28.450	189.807
6^{1}	48	Jimmie Johnson	Hendrick Motorsports	Chevrolet	28.455	189.773
7	14	Tony Stewart	Stewart–Haas Racing	Chevrolet	28.471	189.667
8	20	Joey Logano	Joe Gibbs Racing	Toyota	28.478	189.620
9	16	Greg Biffle	Roush Fenway Racing	Ford	28.496	189.500
10	56	Martin Truex Jr.	Michael Waltrip Racing	Toyota	28.508	189.421
11	17	Matt Kenseth	Roush Fenway Racing	Ford	28.540	189.208
12	51	Kurt Busch	Phoenix Racing	Chevrolet	28.549	189.148
13	55	Mark Martin	Michael Waltrip Racing	Toyota	28.576	188.970
14	22	A. J. Allmendinger	Penske Racing	Dodge	28.581	188.937
15	9	Marcos Ambrose	Richard Petty Motorsports	Ford	28.585	188.910
16	24	Jeff Gordon	Hendrick Motorsports	Chevrolet	28.608	188.758
17	11	Denny Hamlin	Joe Gibbs Racing	Toyota	28.615	188.712
18	39	Ryan Newman	Stewart–Haas Racing	Chevrolet	28.657	188.436
19	1	Jamie McMurray	Earnhardt Ganassi Racing	Chevrolet	28.699	188.160
20	2	Brad Keselowski	Penske Racing	Dodge	28.703	188.134
21	99	Carl Edwards	Roush Fenway Racing	Ford	28.710	188.088
22	31	Jeff Burton	Richard Childress Racing	Chevrolet	28.761	187.754
23	33	Brendan Gaughan	Richard Childress Racing	Chevrolet	28.774	187.669
24	47	Bobby Labonte	JTG Daugherty Racing	Toyota	28.775	187.663
25	21	Trevor Bayne	Wood Brothers Racing	Ford	28.821	187.363
26	27	Paul Menard	Richard Childress Racing	Chevrolet	28.830	187.305
27	43	Aric Almirola	Richard Petty Motorsports	Ford	28.879	186.987
28^{1}	78	Regan Smith	Furniture Row Racing	Chevrolet	28.879	186.987
29^{1}	42	Juan Pablo Montoya	Earnhardt Ganassi Racing	Chevrolet	28.911	186.780
30	83	Landon Cassill	BK Racing	Toyota	29.087	185.650
31	10	David Reutimann	Tommy Baldwin Racing	Chevrolet	29.088	185.644
32	13	Casey Mears	Germain Racing	Ford	29.146	185.274
33	26	Josh Wise	Front Row Motorsports	Ford	29.215	184.837
34	38	David Gilliland	Front Row Motorsports	Ford	29.239	184.685
35	34	David Ragan	Front Row Motorsports	Ford	29.286	184.388
36	49	J. J. Yeley	Robinson-Blakeney Racing	Toyota	29.289	184.370
37	93	Travis Kvapil	BK Racing	Toyota	29.320	184.175
38	36	Dave Blaney	Tommy Baldwin Racing	Chevrolet	29.356	183.949
39	98	Michael McDowell	Phil Parsons Racing	Ford	29.370	183.861
40	87	Joe Nemechek	NEMCO Motorsports	Toyota	29.421	183.542
41	32	Ken Schrader	FAS Lane Racing	Ford	29.459	183.306
42	37	Timmy Hill	Rick Ware Racing/Max Q Motorsports	Ford	29.528	182.877
43	30	David Stremme	Inception Motorsports	Toyota	29.556	182.704
Did not qualify
	23	Scott Riggs	R3 Motorsports	Chevrolet	29.601	182.426
	7	Robby Gordon	Robby Gordon Motorsports	Dodge	29.624	182.285
^{1} Car moved to the back of the grid for going to a backup car: (#18, #48). changing engines: (#42), changing transmission: (#78).

=== Race results ===
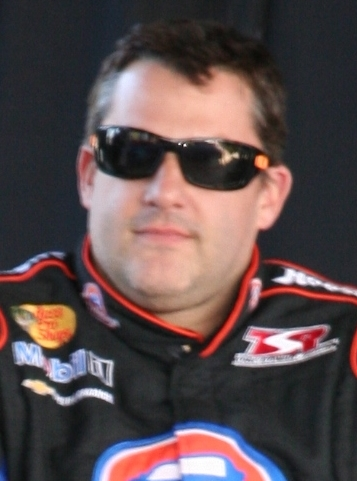
Tony Stewart won the race.

Pos	No.	Driver	Team	Manufacturer	Laps	Led	Points
1	14	Tony Stewart	Stewart–Haas Racing	Chevrolet	267	127	48
2	48	Jimmie Johnson	Hendrick Motorsports	Chevrolet	267	35	43
3	16	Greg Biffle	Roush Fenway Racing	Ford	267	2	42
4	39	Ryan Newman	Stewart–Haas Racing	Chevrolet	267	0	40
5	99	Carl Edwards	Roush Fenway Racing	Ford	267	0	39
6	15	Clint Bowyer	Michael Waltrip Racing	Toyota	267	3	39
7	27	Paul Menard	Richard Childress Racing	Chevrolet	267	0	37
8	1	Jamie McMurray	Earnhardt Ganassi Racing	Chevrolet	267	0	36
9	21	Trevor Bayne	Wood Brothers Racing	Ford	267	0	–
10	88	Dale Earnhardt Jr.	Hendrick Motorsports	Chevrolet	267	70	35
11	29	Kevin Harvick	Richard Childress Racing	Chevrolet	267	4	34
12	24	Jeff Gordon	Hendrick Motorsports	Chevrolet	267	2	33
13	9	Marcos Ambrose	Richard Petty Motorsports	Ford	267	0	31
14	31	Jeff Burton	Richard Childress Racing	Chevrolet	267	0	30
15	78	Regan Smith	Furniture Row Racing	Chevrolet	267	0	29
16	20	Joey Logano	Joe Gibbs Racing	Toyota	267	0	28
17	56	Martin Truex Jr.	Michael Waltrip Racing	Toyota	267	0	27
18	55	Mark Martin	Michael Waltrip Racing	Toyota	267	0	26
19	5	Kasey Kahne	Hendrick Motorsports	Chevrolet	267	0	25
20	11	Denny Hamlin	Joe Gibbs Racing	Toyota	267	0	24
21	34	David Ragan	Front Row Motorsports	Ford	267	1	24
22	17	Matt Kenseth	Roush Fenway Racing	Ford	267	21	23
23	18	Kyle Busch	Joe Gibbs Racing	Toyota	266	0	21
24	43	Aric Almirola	Richard Petty Motorsports	Ford	266	0	20
25	42	Juan Pablo Montoya	Earnhardt Ganassi Racing	Chevrolet	264	0	19
26	47	Bobby Labonte	JTG Daugherty Racing	Toyota	264	0	18
27	13	Casey Mears	Germain Racing	Ford	264	0	17
28	30	David Stremme	Inception Motorsports	Toyota	263	0	16
29	36	Dave Blaney	Tommy Baldwin Racing	Chevrolet	263	0	15
30	32	Ken Schrader	FAS Lane Racing	Ford	263	0	14
31	10	David Reutimann	Tommy Baldwin Racing	Chevrolet	261	0	13
32	2	Brad Keselowski	Penske Racing	Dodge	259	1	13
33	38	David Gilliland	Front Row Motorsports	Ford	258	0	11
34	33	Brendan Gaughan	Richard Childress Racing	Chevrolet	252	0	10
35	51	Kurt Busch	Phoenix Racing	Chevrolet	251	0	9
36	83	Landon Cassill	BK Racing	Toyota	240	0	8
37	22	A. J. Allmendinger	Penske Racing	Dodge	238	1	8
38	98	Michael McDowell	Phil Parsons Racing	Ford	147	0	6
39	93	Travis Kvapil	BK Racing	Toyota	123	0	5
40	26	Josh Wise	Front Row Motorsports	Ford	64	0	4
41	87	Joe Nemechek	NEMCO Motorsports	Toyota	44	0	–
42	37	Timmy Hill	Rick Ware Racing/Max Q Motorsports	Ford	42	0	2
43	49	J. J. Yeley	Robinson-Blakeney Racing	Toyota	39	0	1

== Standings after the race ==
Drivers' Championship standings

Pos	Driver	Wins	Points
1	Greg Biffle	0	125
2	Kevin Harvick	0	115
3	Denny Hamlin	1	113
4	Dale Earnhardt Jr.	0	107
5	Matt Kenseth	1	102

Manufacturers' Championship standings

Pos	Manufacturer	Wins	Points
1	Chevrolet	1	21
2	Ford	1	19
3	Toyota	1	17
4	Dodge	0	9

- Note: Only the top five positions are included for the driver standings.

Previous race: 2012 Subway Fresh Fit 500	Sprint Cup Series; 2012 season	Next race: 2012 Food City 500
