= 2012 Finger Lakes 355 at The Glen =

Race details
- Race 22 of 36 in the 2012 NASCAR Sprint Cup Series
- 2012 Finger Lakes 355 at the Glen program cover
- Date: August 12, 2012
- Location: Watkins Glen International in Watkins Glen, New York
- Course: Permanent racing facility
- Course length: 2.45 miles (3.942 km)
- Distance: 90 laps, 220.5 mi (354.86 km)
- Weather: Overcast with a high temperature around 78 °F (26 °C); wind out of the WSW at 10 mph (16 km/h).

Pole position
Driver	Juan Pablo Montoya	Earnhardt Ganassi Racing
- Time: 1:09:44

Most laps led
Driver	Kyle Busch	Joe Gibbs Racing
- Laps: 43

Winner
No. 9	Marcos Ambrose	Richard Petty Motorsports

Television in the United States
- Network: ESPN
- Announcers: Allen Bestwick, Dale Jarrett and Andy Petree
- Nielsen ratings: 4.449 million

The 2012 Finger Lakes 355 at The Glen was a NASCAR Sprint Cup Series stock car race held on August 12, 2012 at the Watkins Glen International in Watkins Glen, New York. Contested over 90 laps, it was the twenty-second race of the 2012 NASCAR Sprint Cup Series season and the second of two road course competitions on the schedule. After the tragedy at the previous race, the track prepared in the event that thunderstorms pass through the track. The track had set up more than 30 police cars with loudspeakers, nine television screens, and the staff has text message availabilities, all intended on warning fans of any thunderstorms approaching. Marcos Ambrose, from the Richard Petty Motorsports racing team, won the race ahead of Brad Keselowski. Jimmie Johnson finished in the third position. The race was most notable for a "chaotic" finish.

2003 Road Course Champion Robby Gordon did not enter this race, and elected to watch on television.

== Report ==
=== Background ===
The layout of Watkins Glen International NASCAR uses.

Watkins Glen International is one of two road courses to hold NASCAR races, the other being Sonoma Raceway. The standard short road course at Watkins Glen International is a 7-turn course that is 2.45 miles (3.94 km) long; the track was modified in 1992, adding the Inner Loop, which lengthened the long course to 3.4 miles (5.5 km) and the short course to the current length of 2.45 miles (3.94 km). Marcos Ambrose was the defending race winner after winning the race in 2011.

== Results ==
=== Qualifying ===
Grid	No.	Driver	Team	Manufacturer	Time (s)	Speed (mph)
1	42	Juan Pablo Montoya	Earnhardt Ganassi Racing	Chevrolet	69.438	127.020
2	18	Kyle Busch	Joe Gibbs Racing	Toyota	69.488	126.928
3	48	Jimmie Johnson	Hendrick Motorsports	Chevrolet	69.490	126.925
4	2	Brad Keselowski	Penske Racing	Dodge	69.654	126.626
5	9	Marcos Ambrose	Richard Petty Motorsports	Ford	69.710	126.524
6	39	Ryan Newman	Stewart–Haas Racing	Chevrolet	69.827	126.312
7	14	Tony Stewart	Stewart–Haas Racing	Chevrolet	69.917	126.150
8	15	Clint Bowyer	Michael Waltrip Racing	Toyota	69.966	126.061
9	56	Martin Truex Jr.	Michael Waltrip Racing	Toyota	69.973	126.049
10	1	Jamie McMurray	Earnhardt Ganassi Racing	Chevrolet	70.023	125.959
11	98	Michael McDowell	Phil Parsons Racing	Ford	70.160	125.713
12	24	Jeff Gordon	Hendrick Motorsports	Chevrolet	70.199	125.643
13	78	Regan Smith	Furniture Row Racing	Chevrolet	70.216	125.612
14	20	Joey Logano	Joe Gibbs Racing	Toyota	70.269	125.518
15	16	Greg Biffle	Roush Fenway Racing	Ford	70.270	125.516
16	88	Dale Earnhardt Jr.	Hendrick Motorsports	Chevrolet	70.279	125.500
17	22	Sam Hornish Jr.	Penske Racing	Dodge	70.324	125.419
18	99	Carl Edwards	Roush Fenway Racing	Ford	70.330	125.409
19	29	Kevin Harvick	Richard Childress Racing	Chevrolet	70.341	125.389
20	5	Kasey Kahne	Hendrick Motorsports	Chevrolet	70.369	125.339
21	95	Scott Speed	Leavine Family Racing	Ford	70.372	125.334
22	27	Paul Menard	Richard Childress Racing	Chevrolet	70.448	125.199
23	11	Denny Hamlin	Joe Gibbs Racing	Toyota	70.515	125.080
24	17	Matt Kenseth	Roush Fenway Racing	Ford	70.607	124.917
25	32	Boris Said	FAS Lane Racing	Ford	70.678	124.791
26	47	Bobby Labonte	JTG Daugherty Racing	Toyota	70.721	124.715
27	51	Kurt Busch	Phoenix Racing	Chevrolet	70.869	124.455
28	31	Jeff Burton	Richard Childress Racing	Chevrolet	71.010	124.208
29	43	Aric Almirola	Richard Petty Motorsports	Ford	71.022	124.187
30	13	Casey Mears	Germain Racing	Ford	71.054	124.131
31	36	Dave Blaney	Tommy Baldwin Racing	Chevrolet	71.067	124.108
32	34	David Ragan	Front Row Motorsports	Ford	71.205	123.868
33	55	Brian Vickers	Michael Waltrip Racing	Toyota	71.296	123.710
34	38	David Gilliland	Front Row Motorsports	Ford	71.373	123.576
35	83	Landon Cassill	BK Racing	Toyota	71.434	123.471
36	87	Joe Nemechek	NEMCO Motorsports	Toyota	71.454	123.436
37	10	J. J. Yeley	Tommy Baldwin Racing	Chevrolet	71.550	123.270
38	26	Josh Wise	Front Row Motorsports	Ford	71.982	122.531
39	33	Stephen Leicht	Circle Sport	Chevrolet	72.097	122.335
40	19	Chris Cook	Humphrey Smith Racing	Toyota	74.193	118.879
41	49	Jason Leffler	Robinson-Blakeney Racing	Toyota	74.279	118.742
42	30	Patrick Long	Inception Motorsports	Toyota	75.031	117.551
43	93	Travis Kvapil	BK Racing	Toyota	Provisional	Provisional

== Final Lap ==
With three laps to go and Kyle Busch leading, Bobby Labonte's number 47 suffered a drawn-out engine failure, leaving oil all around the track. Brad Keselowski passed Marcos Ambrose to challenge Busch for the final lap. Busch was losing traction from the oil, and slid up the racetrack, followed by Ambrose. Keselowski attempted to pass on the inside, blocked by Busch with car-to-car contact causing Busch to spin, leaving Keselowski in the lead with a damaged front quarter. Keselowski and Ambrose battled hard for first place, both driving through the grass to avoid more oil in turn 8. Ambrose took the lead from Keselowski in turn 9 and was able to hold off a bump and run attempt from Keselowski in turn 10 and Ambrose took the flag, followed by Keselowski. Busch finished 7th.

== Race results ==
Finish	No.	Driver	Make	Team	Laps	Led	Status	Pts
1	9	Marcos Ambrose	Ford	Richard Petty Motorsports	90	8	running	47
2	2	Brad Keselowski	Dodge	Penske Racing	90	37	running	43
3	48	Jimmie Johnson	Chevy	Hendrick Motorsports	90	0	running	41
4	15	Clint Bowyer	Toyota	Michael Waltrip Racing	90	0	running	40
5	22	Sam Hornish Jr.	Dodge	Penske Racing	90	0	running	0
6	16	Greg Biffle	Ford	Roush Fenway Racing	90	0	running	38
7	18	Kyle Busch	Toyota	Joe Gibbs Racing	90	43	running	39
8	17	Matt Kenseth	Ford	Roush Fenway Racing	90	0	running	36
9	78	Regan Smith	Chevy	Furniture Row Racing	90	0	running	35
10	56	Martin Truex Jr.	Toyota	Michael Waltrip Racing	90	0	running	34
11	39	Ryan Newman	Chevy	Stewart–Haas Racing	90	0	running	33
12	27	Paul Menard	Chevy	Richard Childress Racing	90	0	running	32
13	5	Kasey Kahne	Chevy	Hendrick Motorsports	90	0	running	31
14	99	Carl Edwards	Ford	Roush Fenway Racing	90	1	running	31
15	29	Kevin Harvick	Chevy	Richard Childress Racing	90	0	running	29
16	13	Casey Mears	Ford	Germain Racing	90	0	running	28
17	95	Scott Speed	Ford	Leavine Family Racing	90	0	running	27
18	43	Aric Almirola	Ford	Richard Petty Motorsports	90	0	running	26
19	14	Tony Stewart	Chevy	Stewart–Haas Racing	90	0	running	25
20	38	David Gilliland	Ford	Front Row Motorsports	90	0	running	24
21	24	Jeff Gordon	Chevy	Hendrick Motorsports	90	0	running	23
22	34	David Ragan	Ford	Front Row Motorsports	90	0	running	22
23	83	Landon Cassill	Toyota	BK Racing	90	0	running	21
24	93	Travis Kvapil	Toyota	BK Racing	90	0	running	20
25	32	Boris Said	Ford	FAS Lane Racing	90	0	running	19
26	33	Stephen Leicht	Chevy	Circle Sport	90	0	running	18
27	47	Bobby Labonte	Toyota	JTG Daugherty Racing	90	0	running	17
28	88	Dale Earnhardt Jr.	Chevy	Hendrick Motorsports	89	0	running	16
29	87	Joe Nemechek	Toyota	NEMCO Motorsports	88	0	running	0
30	31	Jeff Burton	Chevy	Richard Childress Racing	84	0	running	14
31	51	Kurt Busch	Chevy	Phoenix Racing	81	0	running	13
32	20	Joey Logano	Toyota	Joe Gibbs Racing	71	0	running	12
33	42	Juan Pablo Montoya	Chevy	Earnhardt Ganassi Racing	63	1	crash	12
34	11	Denny Hamlin	Toyota	Joe Gibbs Racing	57	0	engine	10
35	49	Jason Leffler	Toyota	Robinson-Blakeney Racing	42	0	engine	0
36	36	Dave Blaney	Chevy	Tommy Baldwin Racing	41	0	suspension	8
37	98	Michael McDowell	Ford	Phil Parsons Racing	30	0	rear gear	7
38	26	Josh Wise	Ford	Front Row Motorsports	25	0	electrical	6
39	1	Jamie McMurray	Chevy	Earnhardt Ganassi Racing	24	0	crash	5
40	10	J. J. Yeley	Chevy	Tommy Baldwin Racing	15	0	brakes	4
41	19	Chris Cook	Toyota	Humphrey Smith Racing	5	0	brakes	3
42	30	Patrick Long	Toyota	Inception Motorsports	2	0	brakes	2
43	55	Brian Vickers	Toyota	Michael Waltrip Racing	0	0	engine	1

Previous race: 2012 Pennsylvania 400	Sprint Cup Series; 2012 season	Next race: 2012 Pure Michigan 400
