= 2012 NASCAR Sprint Cup Series =

American motorsport season

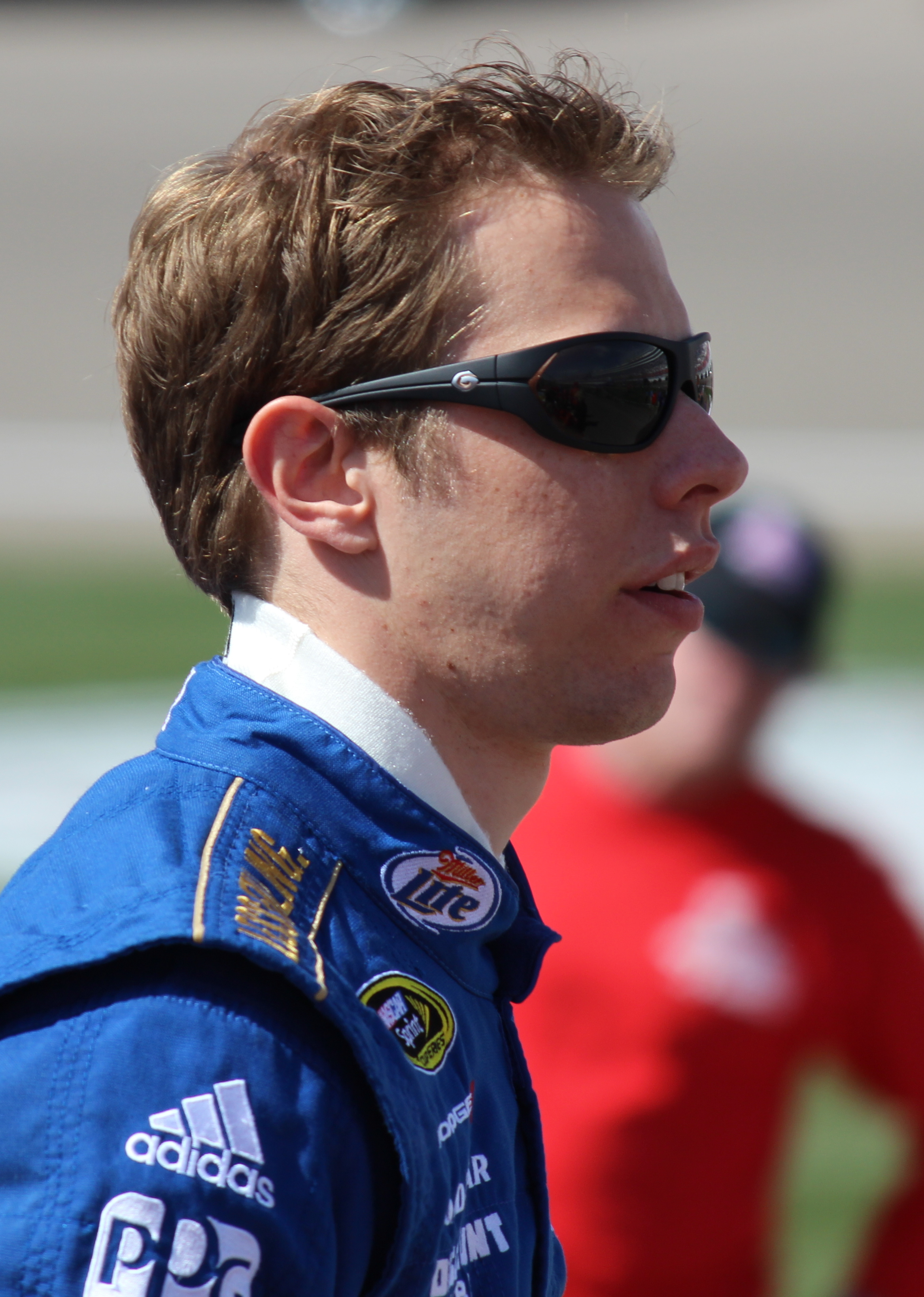
Brad Keselowski, the 2012 Sprint Cup Series champion.

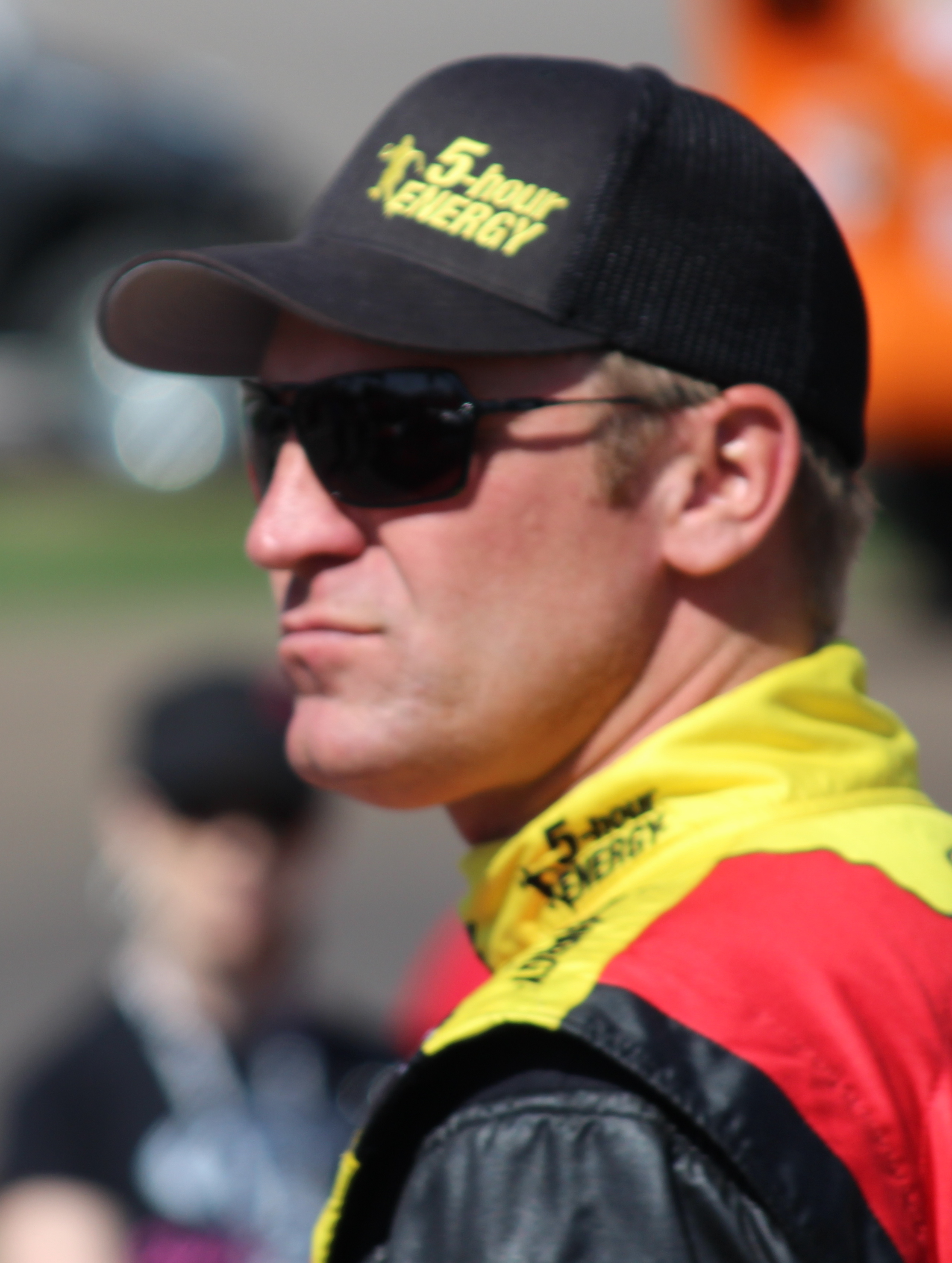
Clint Bowyer finished second in the championship, 39 points back.

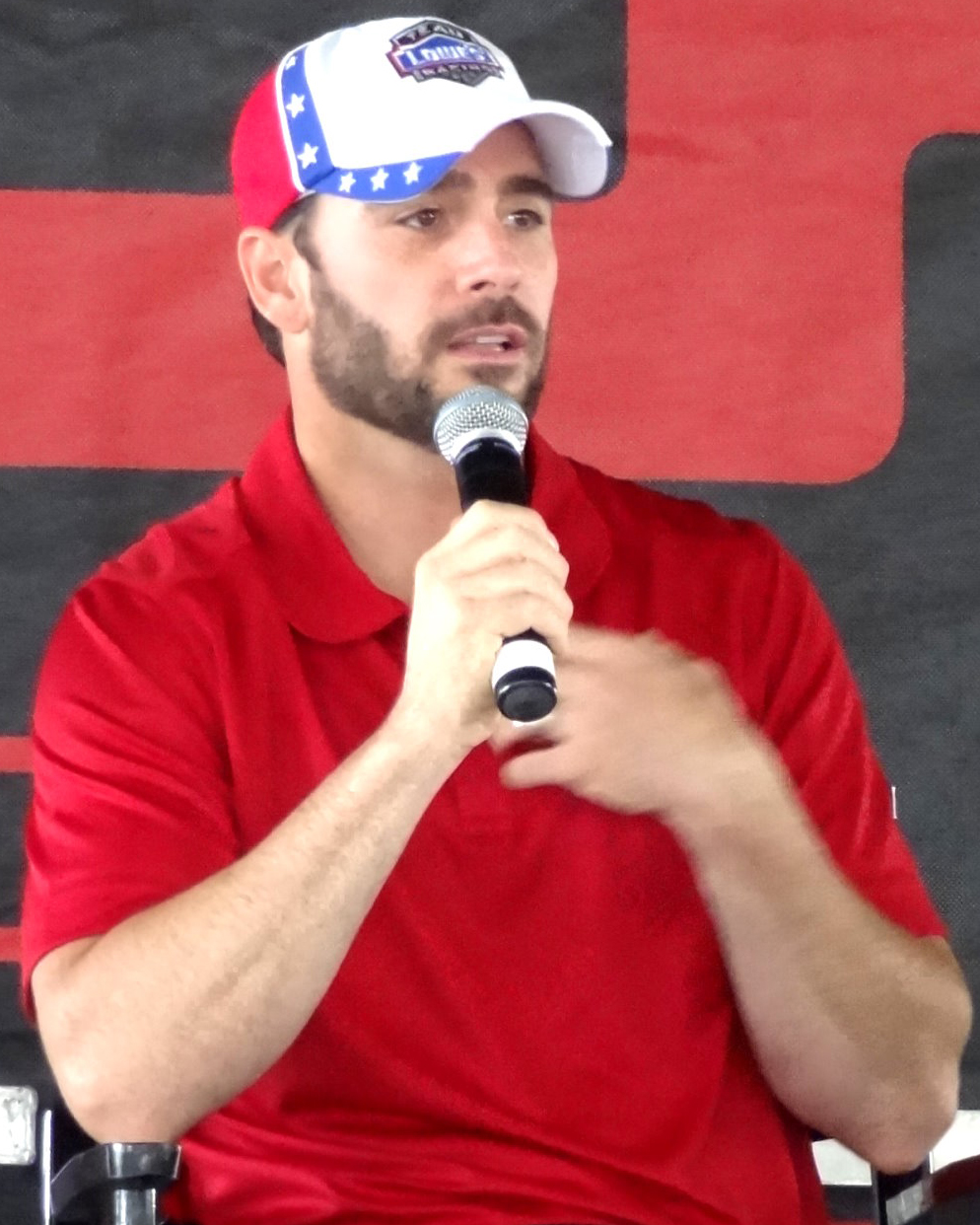
Jimmie Johnson finished third in the championship, 40 points back.

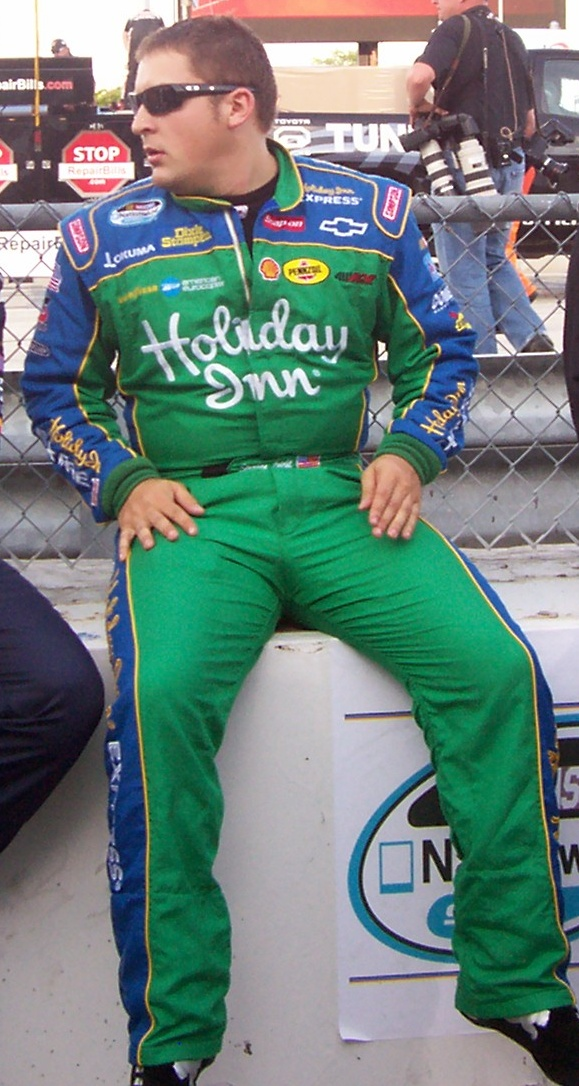
Stephen Leicht, won the 2012 NASCAR Rookie of the Year.

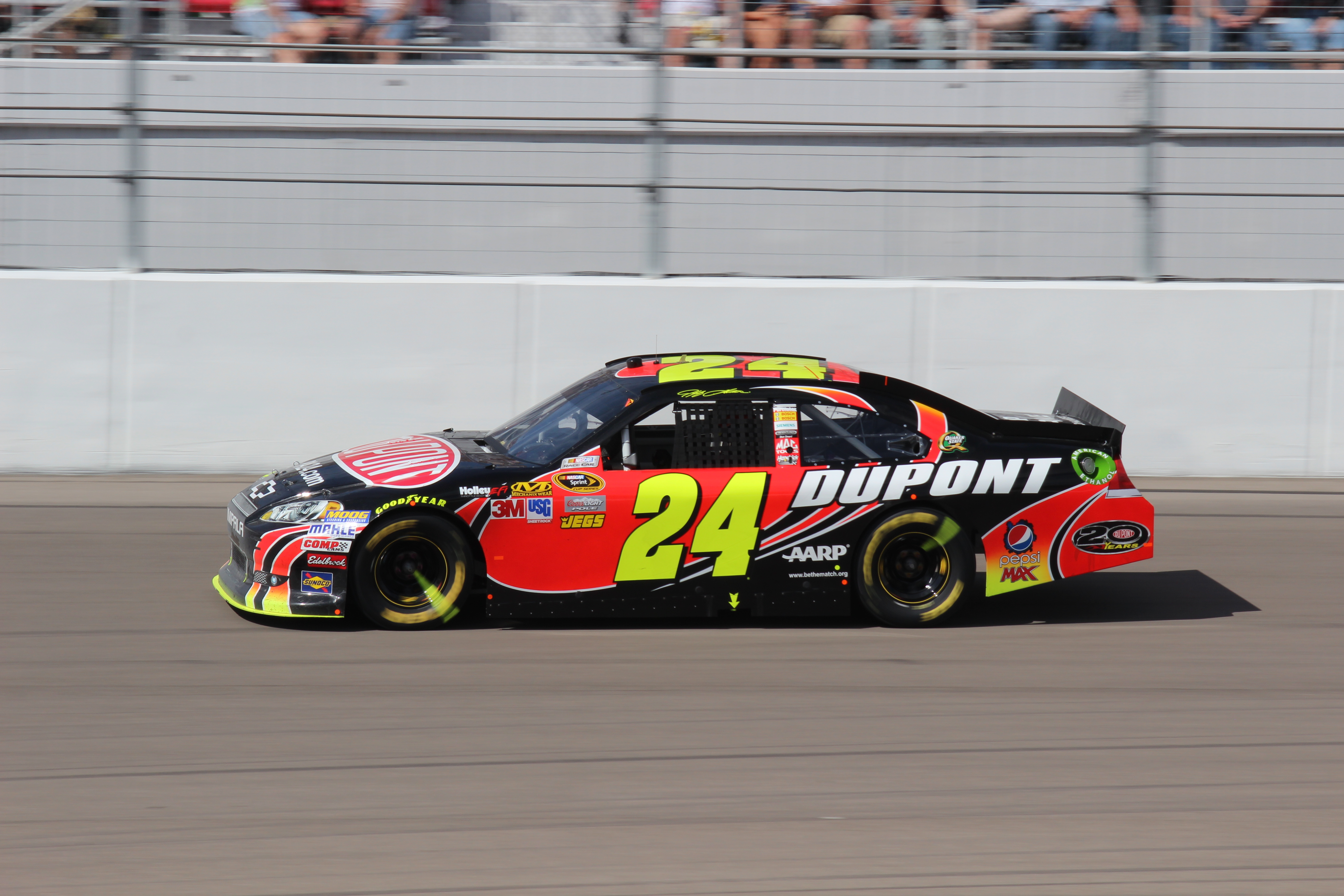
Chevrolet won the Manufacturer's championship with 15 wins & 249 points.

The 2012 NASCAR Sprint Cup Series was the 64th season of NASCAR professional stock car racing in the United States and the 41st modern-era Cup season. The season started on February 18, 2012, at Daytona International Speedway, with the Budweiser Shootout, followed by the Daytona 500 on February 27. The season continued with the Chase for the Sprint Cup beginning on September 16 at Chicagoland Speedway and concluded with the Ford EcoBoost 400 on November 18 at Homestead-Miami Speedway.

During the 2011 season, NASCAR announced the Sprint Cup Series would be changing to fuel injection from carburetors, which had been used since NASCAR's founding in 1949. Sprint Nextel announced at the 2011 Awards Ceremony that they had extended their sponsorship of the series until 2016. Roger Penske won the Owners' Championship, while Brad Keselowski won the Drivers' Championship at the final race of the season. Chevrolet won the Manufacturers' Championship with 249 points. Despite starting his season late, Stephen Leicht was the 2012 NASCAR Rookie of the Year after beating Josh Wise.

2012 was the final season that the fifth-generation cars (also known as the Car of Tomorrow) as the new Generation 6 cars were introduced for the 2013 season. Despite Keselowski winning the championship driving for Dodge, it was the last season the latter would participate in the NASCAR Cup Series until the 2027 season.

== Teams and drivers ==
=== Complete schedule ===
There were 40 full-time teams in 2012.

Manufacturer	Team	No.	Race Driver	Crew Chief
Chevrolet	Earnhardt Ganassi Racing	1	Jamie McMurray	Kevin Manion
Chevrolet	Earnhardt Ganassi Racing	42	Juan Pablo Montoya	Chris Heroy
Chevrolet	Furniture Row Racing	78	Regan Smith 30	Pete Rondeau 19; Todd Berrier 17
Chevrolet	Furniture Row Racing	78	Kurt Busch 6	Pete Rondeau 19; Todd Berrier 17
Chevrolet	Hendrick Motorsports	5	Kasey Kahne	Kenny Francis
Chevrolet	Hendrick Motorsports	24	Jeff Gordon	Alan Gustafson
Chevrolet	Hendrick Motorsports	48	Jimmie Johnson	Chad Knaus
Chevrolet	Hendrick Motorsports	88	Dale Earnhardt Jr. 34	Steve Letarte
Chevrolet	Hendrick Motorsports	88	Regan Smith 2	Steve Letarte
Chevrolet	Phoenix Racing	51	Kurt Busch 29	Nick Harrison
Chevrolet	Phoenix Racing	51	David Reutimann 1	Nick Harrison
Chevrolet	Phoenix Racing	51	A. J. Allmendinger 4	Nick Harrison
Chevrolet	Phoenix Racing	51	Regan Smith 2	Nick Harrison
Chevrolet	Richard Childress Racing	27	Paul Menard	Richard Labbe 31; Shane Wilson 5
Chevrolet	Richard Childress Racing	29	Kevin Harvick	Shane Wilson 24; Gil Martin 12
Chevrolet	Richard Childress Racing	31	Jeff Burton	Drew Blickensderfer 33; Shane Wilson 3
Chevrolet	Richard Childress Racing	33	Elliott Sadler 1	Gil Martin 9 Buddy Sisco 2 Tony Glover 25
Chevrolet	Richard Childress Racing	33	Brendan Gaughan 4	Gil Martin 9 Buddy Sisco 2 Tony Glover 25
Chevrolet	Richard Childress Racing	33	Hermie Sadler 1	Gil Martin 9 Buddy Sisco 2 Tony Glover 25
Chevrolet	Richard Childress Racing	33	Austin Dillon 1	Gil Martin 9 Buddy Sisco 2 Tony Glover 25
Chevrolet	Circle Sport	33	Tony Raines 2	Gil Martin 9 Buddy Sisco 2 Tony Glover 25
Chevrolet	Circle Sport	33	Jeff Green 1	Gil Martin 9 Buddy Sisco 2 Tony Glover 25
Chevrolet	Circle Sport	33	Stephen Leicht (R) 21	Gil Martin 9 Buddy Sisco 2 Tony Glover 25
Chevrolet	Circle Sport	33	Cole Whitt 5	Gil Martin 9 Buddy Sisco 2 Tony Glover 25
Chevrolet	Stewart–Haas Racing	14	Tony Stewart	Steve Addington
Chevrolet	Stewart–Haas Racing	39	Ryan Newman	Tony Gibson32; Matt Borland4
Chevrolet	Stewart–Haas Racing	10	Danica Patrick 10	Tommy Baldwin Jr. 30; Steve Wood 2 Greg Zipadelli 1 Tony Gibson 2 Brandon Thomas 1
Chevrolet	Tommy Baldwin Racing	10	David Reutimann 21	Tommy Baldwin Jr. 30; Steve Wood 2 Greg Zipadelli 1 Tony Gibson 2 Brandon Thomas 1
Chevrolet	Tommy Baldwin Racing	10	Dave Blaney 1	Tommy Baldwin Jr. 30; Steve Wood 2 Greg Zipadelli 1 Tony Gibson 2 Brandon Thomas 1
Chevrolet	Tommy Baldwin Racing	10	Tony Raines 1	Tommy Baldwin Jr. 30; Steve Wood 2 Greg Zipadelli 1 Tony Gibson 2 Brandon Thomas 1
Chevrolet	Tommy Baldwin Racing	10	Tomy Drissi 1	Tommy Baldwin Jr. 30; Steve Wood 2 Greg Zipadelli 1 Tony Gibson 2 Brandon Thomas 1
Chevrolet	Tommy Baldwin Racing	10	J. J. Yeley 2	Tommy Baldwin Jr. 30; Steve Wood 2 Greg Zipadelli 1 Tony Gibson 2 Brandon Thomas 1
Chevrolet	Tommy Baldwin Racing	36	Dave Blaney 32	Ryan Pemberton 33; Tommy Baldwin Jr. 3
Chevrolet	Tommy Baldwin Racing	36	Tony Raines 3	Ryan Pemberton 33; Tommy Baldwin Jr. 3
Chevrolet	Tommy Baldwin Racing	36	J. J. Yeley 1	Ryan Pemberton 33; Tommy Baldwin Jr. 3
Dodge	Penske Racing	2	Brad Keselowski	Paul Wolfe
Dodge	Penske Racing	22	A. J. Allmendinger 17	Todd Gordon
Dodge	Penske Racing	22	Sam Hornish Jr. 19	Todd Gordon
Ford	FAS Lane Racing	32	Terry Labonte 4	Frank Stoddard
Ford	FAS Lane Racing	32	Mike Bliss 1	Frank Stoddard
Ford	FAS Lane Racing	32	Ken Schrader 13	Frank Stoddard
Ford	FAS Lane Racing	32	Reed Sorenson 6	Frank Stoddard
Ford	FAS Lane Racing	32	T. J. Bell 5	Frank Stoddard
Ford	FAS Lane Racing	32	Boris Said 2	Frank Stoddard
Ford	FAS Lane Racing	32	Jason White 1	Frank Stoddard
Ford	FAS Lane Racing	32	Mike Olsen 1	Frank Stoddard
Ford	FAS Lane Racing	32	Timmy Hill 3	Frank Stoddard
Ford	Front Row Motorsports	26	Tony Raines 1	Charles Dickey Jr.
Ford	Front Row Motorsports	26	Josh Wise (R) 35	Charles Dickey Jr.
Ford	Front Row Motorsports	34	David Ragan	Jay Guy
Ford	Front Row Motorsports	38	David Gilliland	Pat Tryson 30; Derrick Finley 6
Ford	Germain Racing	13	Casey Mears	Bootie Barker
Ford	Phil Parsons Racing	98	Michael McDowell 33	Gene Nead
Ford	Phil Parsons Racing	98	David Mayhew 1	Gene Nead
Ford	Phil Parsons Racing	98	Mike Skinner 2	Gene Nead
Ford	Richard Petty Motorsports	9	Marcos Ambrose	Todd Parrott 26; Mike Ford 7 Drew Blickensderfer3
Ford	Richard Petty Motorsports	43	Aric Almirola	Greg Erwin 9 Mike Ford 17; Todd Parrott 10
Ford	Roush Fenway Racing	16	Greg Biffle	Matt Puccia
Ford	Roush Fenway Racing	17	Matt Kenseth	Jimmy Fennig
Ford	Roush Fenway Racing	99	Carl Edwards	Bob Osbourne 19; Chad Norris 17
Toyota	BK Racing	83	Landon Cassill	Doug Richert
Toyota	BK Racing	93	David Reutimann 2	Todd Anderson
Toyota	BK Racing	93	Travis Kvapil 34	Todd Anderson
Toyota	Inception Motorsports; Swan Racing	30	David Stremme 34	Steve Lane
Toyota	Inception Motorsports; Swan Racing	30	Brian Simo 1	Steve Lane
Toyota	Inception Motorsports; Swan Racing	30	Patrick Long 1	Steve Lane
Toyota	Joe Gibbs Racing	11	Denny Hamlin	Darian Grubb
Toyota	Joe Gibbs Racing	18	Kyle Busch	Dave Rogers
Toyota	Joe Gibbs Racing	20	Joey Logano	Jason Ratcliff
Toyota	JTG Daugherty Racing	47	Bobby Labonte	Todd Berrier 19; David Hyder 1 Brian Burns 16
Toyota	Michael Waltrip Racing	15	Clint Bowyer	Brian Pattie
Toyota	Michael Waltrip Racing	55	Mark Martin 24	Rodney Childers
Toyota	Michael Waltrip Racing	55	Brian Vickers 8	Rodney Childers
Toyota	Michael Waltrip Racing	55	Michael Waltrip 4	Rodney Childers
Toyota	Michael Waltrip Racing	56	Martin Truex Jr.	Chad Johnston 34; Scott Miller 2
Toyota	NEMCO Motorsports	87	Joe Nemechek	Stephen Gray

The No. 33 changed owners in April. Joe Falk acquired the assets and ownership and was listed as owner after Martinsville; however Childress still fielded the car in races which Austin Dillon competed in.

=== Limited schedule ===
Manufacturer	Team	No.	Race Driver	Crew Chief	Rounds
Chevrolet	Max Q Motorsports; Tommy Baldwin Racing	37	J. J. Yeley	Bill Henderson 3 Tony Furr 11	13
Chevrolet	Max Q Motorsports; Tommy Baldwin Racing	37	Dave Blaney	Bill Henderson 3 Tony Furr 11	1
Chevrolet	Turn One Racing	74	Reed Sorenson	Peter Sospenzo	3
Chevrolet	Turn One Racing	74	Stacy Compton	Peter Sospenzo	3
Chevrolet	Turn One Racing	74	Tony Raines	Peter Sospenzo	1
Chevrolet	Turn One Racing	74	Cole Whitt	Peter Sospenzo	4
Chevrolet	Turner Motorsports	50	Bill Elliott	Trent Owens	1
Dodge	Penske Racing	12	Sam Hornish Jr.	Chad Walter	1
Dodge	Robby Gordon Motorsports	7	Robby Gordon	Samuel Stanley 4 Shane Bourgeois1	5
Ford	Go Green Racing	79	Tim Andrews	Paul Andrews 3 Mike Abner8	1
Ford	Go Green Racing	79	Scott Speed	Paul Andrews 3 Mike Abner8	2
Ford	Go Green Racing	79	Kelly Bires	Paul Andrews 3 Mike Abner8	6
Ford	Go Green Racing	79	Mike Skinner	Paul Andrews 3 Mike Abner8	1
Ford	Go Green Racing	79	Reed Sorenson	Paul Andrews 3 Mike Abner8	1
Ford	Leavine Family Racing	95	Scott Speed	Wally Rogers	16
Ford	Max Q Motorsports; Rick Ware Racing	37	Mike Wallace	Bill Henderson	1
Ford	Max Q Motorsports; Rick Ware Racing	37	Timmy Hill (R)	Bill Henderson	4
Ford	Max Q Motorsports; Rick Ware Racing	37	Tony Raines	Bill Henderson	1
Ford	Roush Fenway Racing	6	Ricky Stenhouse Jr.	Chad Norris 1 Scott Graves3	4
Ford	Wood Brothers Racing	21	Trevor Bayne	Donnie Wingo	16
Ford	Xxxtreme Motorsport	44	David Reutimann	Frank Kerr	1
Toyota	BK Racing	73	Travis Kvapil	Buddy Sisco	1
Toyota	BK Racing	73	David Reutimann	Buddy Sisco	1
Toyota	Hamilton Means Racing	52	Scott Speed	Scott Eggleston	1
Toyota	Hamilton Means Racing	52	Mike Skinner	Scott Eggleston	3
Toyota	Hillman Racing	40	Michael Waltrip	Buddy Sisco	1
Toyota	Hillman Racing	40	Tony Raines	Buddy Sisco	1
Toyota	NEMCO Motorsports	97	Bill Elliott	Scott Eggleston	2
Toyota	NEMCO Motorsports	97	Timmy Hill	Scott Eggleston	1
Toyota	RAB Racing	09	Kenny Wallace	Scott Zipadelli	1
Toyota	Robinson-Blakeney Racing	49	J. J. Yeley	Tony Furr 19; Scott Eggleston 6	19
Toyota	Robinson-Blakeney Racing	49	Jason Leffler	Tony Furr 19; Scott Eggleston 6	6
Toyota	SS Motorsports	0	Mark Green	Brad Smales	1
Toyota	R3 Motorsports	23	Robert Richardson Jr.	Bryan Cook 1 Greg Conner 29; Cruz Gonzalez 1	4
Chevrolet	R3 Motorsports	23	Scott Riggs	Bryan Cook 1 Greg Conner 29; Cruz Gonzalez 1	27
Toyota 28 Ford 1	Humphrey Smith Racing	19	Mike Bliss	Paul Clapprood 16; Skip Pope 13	25
Toyota 28 Ford 1	Humphrey Smith Racing	19	Chris Cook	Paul Clapprood 16; Skip Pope 13	2
Toyota 28 Ford 1	Humphrey Smith Racing	19	Jason Leffler	Paul Clapprood 16; Skip Pope 13	1
Toyota 28 Ford 1	Humphrey Smith Racing	19	Jeff Green	Paul Clapprood 16; Skip Pope 13	1
Ford 1 Toyota 8 Chevrolet 6	Humphrey Smith Racing	91	Reed Sorenson	Peter Sospenzo	13
Ford 1 Toyota 8 Chevrolet 6	Humphrey Smith Racing	91	Jason Leffler	Peter Sospenzo	2

=== Team changes ===
- Roush Fenway Racing supported only three Sprint Cup Series teams after sponsorship troubles led to the closure of the No. 6 team, then driven by David Ragan. The team ran the Daytona 500 with 2011 Nationwide Series champion Ricky Stenhouse Jr. and ran other races that depended on sponsorship.
- Richard Childress Racing also downsized to three teams. Their No. 33 entry ran the first six races, with Elliott Sadler running the Daytona 500, Brendan Gaughan running the next four, and Hermie Sadler running at Martinsville. After Martinsville, Virginia car dealer and LJ Racing owner Joe Falk acquired ownership of the #33.
- Germain Racing changed their manufacturer to Ford after being with Toyota in 2011.
- The Racer's Group owner Kevin Buckler announced the closure of his NASCAR team TRG Motorsports on January 9, 2012.
- Red Bull Racing Team officially closed in December 2011.
- Turn One Racing and Go Green Racing announced plans to enter the Cup Series in 2012. Turn One had scheduled 8 to 10 races after the Daytona 500, while Go Green Racing fielded the No. 19 Ford for Tim Andrews with his father Paul as the crew chief for 10 races.
- Robinson-Blakeney Racing fielded a Cup Series team for J. J. Yeley.
- Turner Motorsports attempted to make its Cup Series debut at Daytona in July. The team fielded a No. 50 Chevrolet for veteran Bill Elliott sponsored by retail chain Walmart in celebration of the 50th anniversary of the chain's founding.
- Stewart–Haas Racing and Tommy Baldwin Racing announced on January 31 that they had formed an alliance for the 2012 season. TBR transferred the owners points of its No. 36 car over to SHR's No. 10 team, ensuring Danica Patrick a spot in the Daytona 500. Furthermore, David Reutimann drove the No. 10 in the 26 races that Patrick does not drive in.
- In February 2012, former Red Bull Racing Team director Thomas Ueberall purchased the owner's points of the No. 83 and No. 4 (later changed to 93). The team is known as BK Racing. Landon Cassill drove the No. 83 and Travis Kvapil drove the No. 93 at most of the races with David Reutimann piloting the car for the Daytona 500.
- On February 13, 2012, Michael Waltrip Racing purchased the owner's points from FAS Lane Racing and transferred them to the No. 55 ride, which guaranteed Mark Martin a spot in the Daytona 500. FAS Lane later acquired the 2011 owner's points from the Roush Fenway Racing team's No. 6 ride.
- Inception Motorsports acquired the owner's points of the dormant TRG Motorsports team, which finished 36th in 2011 Owners Championship.

=== Crew chief changes ===
- On July 27, 2011, Hendrick Motorsports announced that Kenny Francis would join driver Kasey Kahne in 2012, continuing their partnership. Former crew chief Lance McGrew worked on developing the Chevrolet for the 2013 season.
- Mike Ford, the crew chief for Denny Hamlin in 2011, was fired by Joe Gibbs Racing. He eventually took over Crew Chief Duties for Aric Almirola midway through the 2012 season
- Former Penske Racing crew chief Steve Addington announced his hiring by Stewart–Haas Racing to be crew chief for Tony Stewart.
- SHR crew chief Darian Grubb was informed of his post-season release by Tony Stewart prior to the 2011 Bank of America 500. He was later hired by Joe Gibbs Racing to crew chief for Denny Hamlin.
- Hendrick Motorsports engineer Chris Heroy was signed as the crew chief for Juan Pablo Montoya.
- Former Earnhardt Ganassi Racing crew chief Brian Pattie was hired by Michael Waltrip Racing to be crew chief for Clint Bowyer's No. 15 car.
- Richard Childress Racing crew chiefs Gil Martin and Shane Wilson swapped cars for 2012, with Martin crew chiefing the No. 33 on a limited basis and Wilson moving to the 29 at Kevin Harvick's request.
- After being released by Red Bull Racing Team after the 2011 season, Ryan Pemberton was the crew chief for Dave Blaney at Tommy Baldwin Racing after Philippe Lopez left the team for Richard Petty Motorsports' Nationwide Series team.

=== Driver changes ===
==== Changed teams ====
- Following the loss of one of his major sponsors, 2011 Richard Petty Motorsports driver A. J. Allmendinger moved to Penske Racing to drive the vacated No. 22 Dodge.
- Clint Bowyer changed teams for the 2012 season moving from Richard Childress Racing to Michael Waltrip Racing (MWR) where he drove the No. 15 5-hour Energy Toyota.
- Kurt Busch, whose 2011 season was marked by various behavior problems, mutually agreed with Roger Penske and sponsors Royal Dutch Shell and Pennzoil to be released from Penske Racing. Busch was later announced as the driver of the No. 51 Chevrolet run by Phoenix Racing.
- Kasey Kahne replaced Mark Martin in the Hendrick Motorsports No. 5 Chevrolet with Farmers Insurance Group sponsorship.
- Expressing the desire to run a limited schedule, Mark Martin joined MWR for 2012 for 25 races, driving the No. 55 Aaron's Toyota vacated by David Reutimann.
- David Reutimann, who drove for Michael Waltrip Racing in 2011, signed a one-year contract to drive for Tommy Baldwin Racing and BK Racing.
- Former Roush Fenway Racing driver David Ragan signed to drive for Front Row Motorsports in the No. 34 Ford.
- Landon Cassill and Travis Kvapil signed to drive with BK Racing, a team that purchased the assets of the former Red Bull Racing Team.

==== Entered the series ====
- On November 4, 2011, it was announced that former IndyCar driver Danica Patrick would drive the No. 10 GoDaddy.com Chevrolet for Stewart–Haas Racing for 10 races.
- On January 4, 2012, Richard Petty Motorsports announced that Aric Almirola would drive the team's 'iconic' No. 43 Ford after driving in the Nationwide Series in 2011.
- On February 15, Rick Ware Racing announced its partnership with Larry Gunselman's Max Q Motorsports to run 2011 Nationwide Series ROTY Timmy Hill in the No. 37 Ford. Mike Wallace attempted Daytona. Ware dissolved the partnership after Hill decided to return to the Nationwide Series. Max Q reformed in July 2012 with a technical agreement from Tommy Baldwin Racing.
- On January 20, 2012, Go Green Racing announced they would attempt at least 10 Sprint Cup Series races with Tim Andrews in the No. 19 Ford, with his father Paul Andrews, a longtime crew chief, leading the effort.

==== Exited the series ====
- After being released by TRG Motorsports following the 2011 season, 2011 Rookie of the Year winner Andy Lally returned to the Rolex Sports Car Series to drive for Magnus Racing in the GT category. TRG later suspended its Cup team.

== Changes ==
=== Technology ===
On January 21, 2011, NASCAR announced that the Sprint Cup Series would change to electronic fuel injection from carburetors, which had been used since 1949, for the 2012 season. During the 2010 off-season, NASCAR had discussed doing the change during the 2011 season; however, in the January 21 announcements, Robin Pemberton stated, "We don't anticipate any points races this year, or races with fuel injection. It'll be a year dedicated to finetuning and getting the process down, whether it be inspection or the team side of it, with building engines. That's going along quite well." Afterward, John Darby, NASCAR's managing director of competition, said he hoped to debut the electronic fuel injection engine at least in the second race of the 2012 season.

=== Communication ===
After the 2011 season ended, NASCAR decided to ban communication between the driver and spotter to other drivers. The change was initially made to break up two-car racing at restrictor plate tracks, which had received criticism from spectators, but was later announced that it would be banned at all the races.

== Schedule ==
On September 28, 2011, the final calendar was released containing 36 races, with the addition of two exhibition races. The schedule also includes two Gatorade Duels, which are the qualifying races for the Daytona 500.

No.	Race title	Track	Date	Time (ET)
	Budweiser Shootout	Daytona International Speedway, Daytona Beach	February 18	8:00 PM
	Gatorade Duel	Daytona International Speedway, Daytona Beach	February 23	2:00 PM
1	Daytona 500	Daytona International Speedway, Daytona Beach	February 27†	7:00 PM
2	Subway Fresh Fit 500	Phoenix International Raceway, Phoenix	March 4	3:00 PM
3	Kobalt Tools 400	Las Vegas Motor Speedway, Las Vegas	March 11	3:00 PM
4	Food City 500	Bristol Motor Speedway, Bristol	March 18	1:00 PM
5	Auto Club 400	Auto Club Speedway, Fontana	March 25	3:00 PM
6	Goody's Fast Relief 500	Martinsville Speedway, Ridgeway	April 1	1:00 PM
7	Samsung Mobile 500	Texas Motor Speedway, Fort Worth	April 14	7:30 PM
8	STP 400	Kansas Speedway, Kansas City	April 22	1:00 PM
9	Capital City 400	Richmond International Raceway, Richmond	April 28	7:30 PM
10	Aaron's 499	Talladega Superspeedway, Talladega	May 6	1:00 PM
11	Bojangles Southern 500	Darlington Raceway, Darlington	May 12	7:00 PM
	Sprint Showdown	Charlotte Motor Speedway, Concord	May 19	7:00 PM
	NASCAR Sprint All-Star Race	Charlotte Motor Speedway, Concord	May 19	9:00 PM
12	Coca-Cola 600	Charlotte Motor Speedway, Concord	May 27	6:00 PM
13	FedEx 400 benefiting Autism Speaks	Dover International Speedway, Dover	June 3	1:00 PM
14	Pocono 400 presented by #NASCAR	Pocono Raceway, Long Pond	June 10	1:00 PM
15	Quicken Loans 400	Michigan International Speedway, Brooklyn	June 17	1:00 PM
16	Toyota/Save Mart 350	Sonoma Raceway, Sonoma	June 24	3:00 PM
17	Quaker State 400	Kentucky Speedway, Sparta	June 30	7:30 PM
18	Coke Zero 400 powered by Coca-Cola	Daytona International Speedway, Daytona Beach	July 7	7:30 PM
19	Lenox Industrial Tools 301	New Hampshire Motor Speedway, Loudon	July 15	1:00 PM
20	Crown Royal presents the Curtiss Shaver 400	Indianapolis Motor Speedway, Speedway	July 29	1:00 PM
21	Pennsylvania 400	Pocono Raceway, Long Pond	August 5	1:00 PM
22	Finger Lakes 355 at The Glen	Watkins Glen International, Watkins Glen	August 12	1:00 PM
23	Pure Michigan 400	Michigan International Speedway, Brooklyn	August 19	1:00 PM
24	Irwin Tools Night Race	Bristol Motor Speedway, Bristol	August 25	7:30 PM
25	AdvoCare 500	Atlanta Motor Speedway, Hampton	September 2	7:30 PM
26	Federated Auto Parts 400	Richmond International Raceway, Richmond	September 8	7:30 PM
Chase for the Sprint Cup
27	GEICO 400	Chicagoland Speedway, Joliet	September 16	2:00 PM
28	Sylvania 300	New Hampshire Motor Speedway, Loudon	September 23	2:00 PM
29	AAA 400	Dover International Speedway, Dover	September 30	2:00 PM
30	Good Sam Roadside Assistance 500	Talladega Superspeedway, Talladega	October 7	2:00 PM
31	Bank of America 500	Charlotte Motor Speedway, Concord	October 13	7:30 PM
32	Hollywood Casino 400	Kansas Speedway, Kansas City	October 21	2:00 PM
33	Tums Fast Relief 500	Martinsville Speedway, Ridgeway	October 28	1:30 PM
34	AAA Texas 500	Texas Motor Speedway, Fort Worth	November 4	3:00 PM
35	AdvoCare 500	Phoenix International Raceway, Phoenix	November 11	3:00 PM
36	Ford EcoBoost 400	Homestead-Miami Speedway, Homestead	November 18	3:00 PM
†: The Daytona 500 was postponed a day because of persistent rain.

=== Calendar changes ===
For the 2012 season, NASCAR made a few changes to the schedule. One of which moved the first race of the season, the Daytona 500, a week later. Along with the delay of the Daytona 500, the races at Phoenix International Raceway and Las Vegas Motor Speedway were moved a week later. Third, Kansas Speedway's first race of the season was moved from June to April, while its second race became the sixth race of the Chase for the Sprint Cup, after switching race dates with Talladega Superspeedway's Good Sam Roadside Assistance 500. Along with schedule changes, race lengths at Pocono Raceway changed from 500 miles to 400 miles in both races. A couple more changes occurred in the regular season because Dover International Speedway's first race followed the Coca-Cola 600, as well as switching the race dates of the Aaron's 499 and Richmond International Raceway's first event. Also, Kentucky Speedway's race was before the Coke Zero 400 at Daytona International Speedway.

== Pre-season ==
Pre-season testing began on January 12, 2012, with NASCAR Preseason Thunder at Daytona International Speedway in Daytona Beach, Florida. The tests lasted three days, with each having a morning and afternoon session. In the morning session on the first day, Jeff Gordon was quickest ahead of Paul Menard and Kurt Busch with a time of 46.687 seconds. The afternoon test session featured limited tandem drafting, and Kyle Busch and six other cars broke the 200 MPH mark. Defending champion Tony Stewart stated his excitement for returning to Daytona, "Our sport is unique obviously having our biggest race the first race of the year, but it's very fitting at the same time because this race, we have more time during the offseason to prepare for this race than we do the others. You bring cars here that you have the extra time to just make them that little bit nicer than you normally have time to do."

On the second day, Martin Truex Jr. was quickest in the morning session after posting a time of 43.962 seconds, while Kurt Busch was quickest in the afternoon with a time of 43.677. The final day of testing was led by Jeff Gordon who topped the charts. The final day focused on neutralizing the controversial two-car draft. The third day of testing focused on drafting, and Vice President of Competition Robin Pemberton was pleased with the progress drivers and teams had made. "The way the cars run in the draft, the way they can draft and do draft and what they do to get their cars running to their maximum potential. So far, we like what we've seen. It's been a good mix of what they can do in a larger pack and how close they can get for a limited time to push."

== Season summary ==
The season began with the annual Budweiser Shootout. Multiple cautions stemming from tight pack racing whittled down the field to only a few cars. On the last lap, Kyle Busch used a slingshot move to pass defending champion Tony Stewart to win his first Shootout. In the Duels, defending champion Tony Stewart held off the field for his third Duel victory, while Roush Fenway Racing teammates Matt Kenseth and Greg Biffle dominated the second duel, with Kenseth prevailing. In the season opening Daytona 500, persistent showers on February 26 forced the race to be postponed to Monday for the first time in its 53-year history. Starting at night, the race would take its most dramatic turn when Juan Pablo Montoya, attempting to catch up with the field under caution, had a part failure on his car, which veered up the racetrack into a jet dryer, sparking a brief fire that forced a 2-hour red flag, causing the race to run into Tuesday (another first). After the flag was lifted, Kenseth held off teammate Biffle and Dale Earnhardt Jr. on a green-white-checkered finish to win his second Daytona 500 and capture Jack Roush's 300th victory in NASCAR.

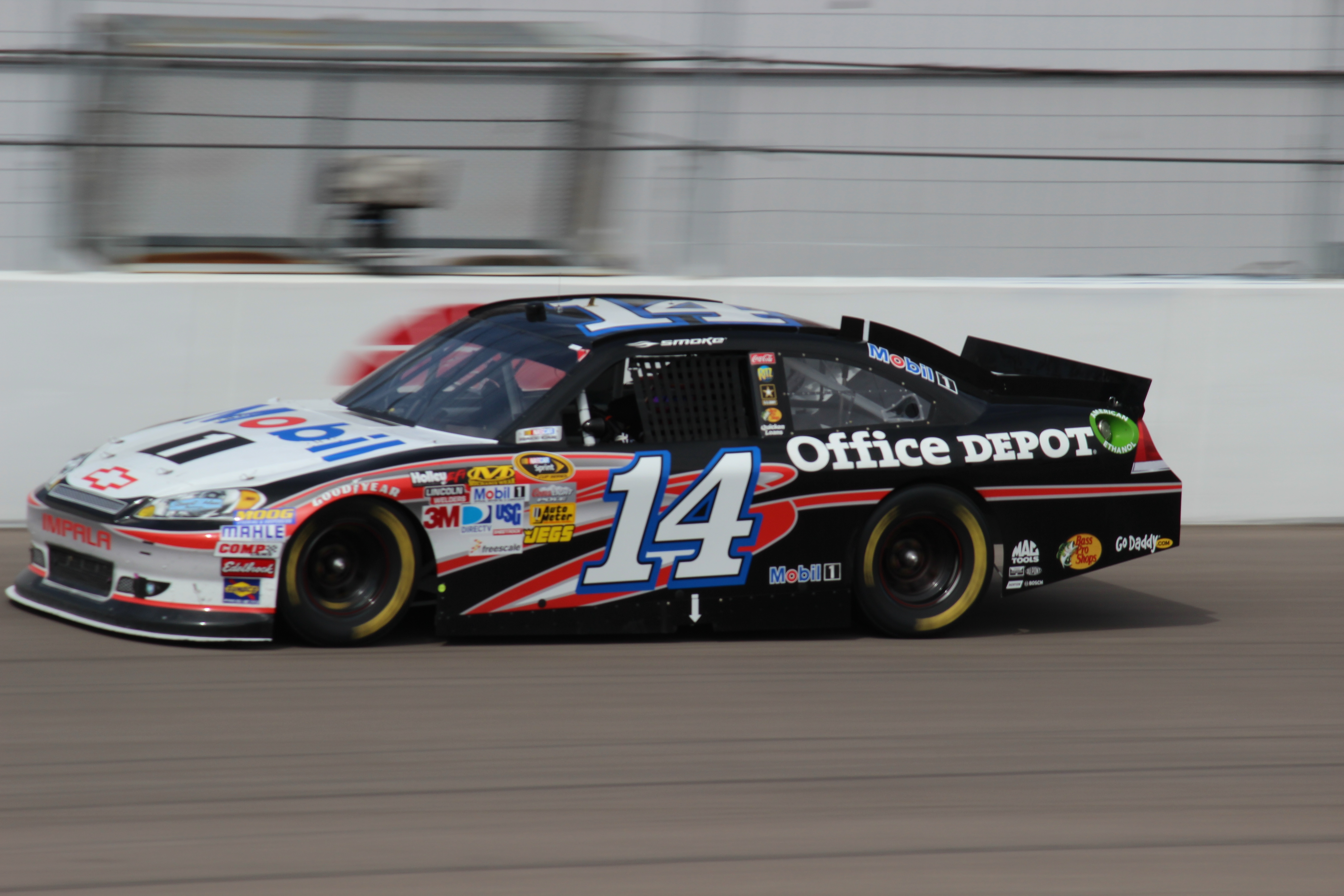
Tony Stewart won his first race of the 2012 season at Las Vegas.

The next week in Phoenix, Kevin Harvick dominated the race, but Denny Hamlin grabbed the lead late, and held off Harvick for his first win of 2012. The next week in Las Vegas, Tony Stewart dominated the race once again and held off Jimmie Johnson on a late restart to grab his first win of 2012 and his first at Las Vegas. The first short track race was at Bristol, and Brad Keselowski dominated the race, leading 232 laps and rolling to his first win of the season. The following weekend in California, Kyle Busch led for 80 laps, but Tony Stewart stayed on track when the rain came on lap 124, and was declared the winner when the race was called on lap 129. The next race at Martinsville, Jeff Gordon dominated the race, leading 329 laps. However, a late crash caused by Clint Bowyer and Jimmie Johnson set up a green-white-checkered finish, enabling Ryan Newman to take the lead and hold of A. J. Allmendinger for the win.

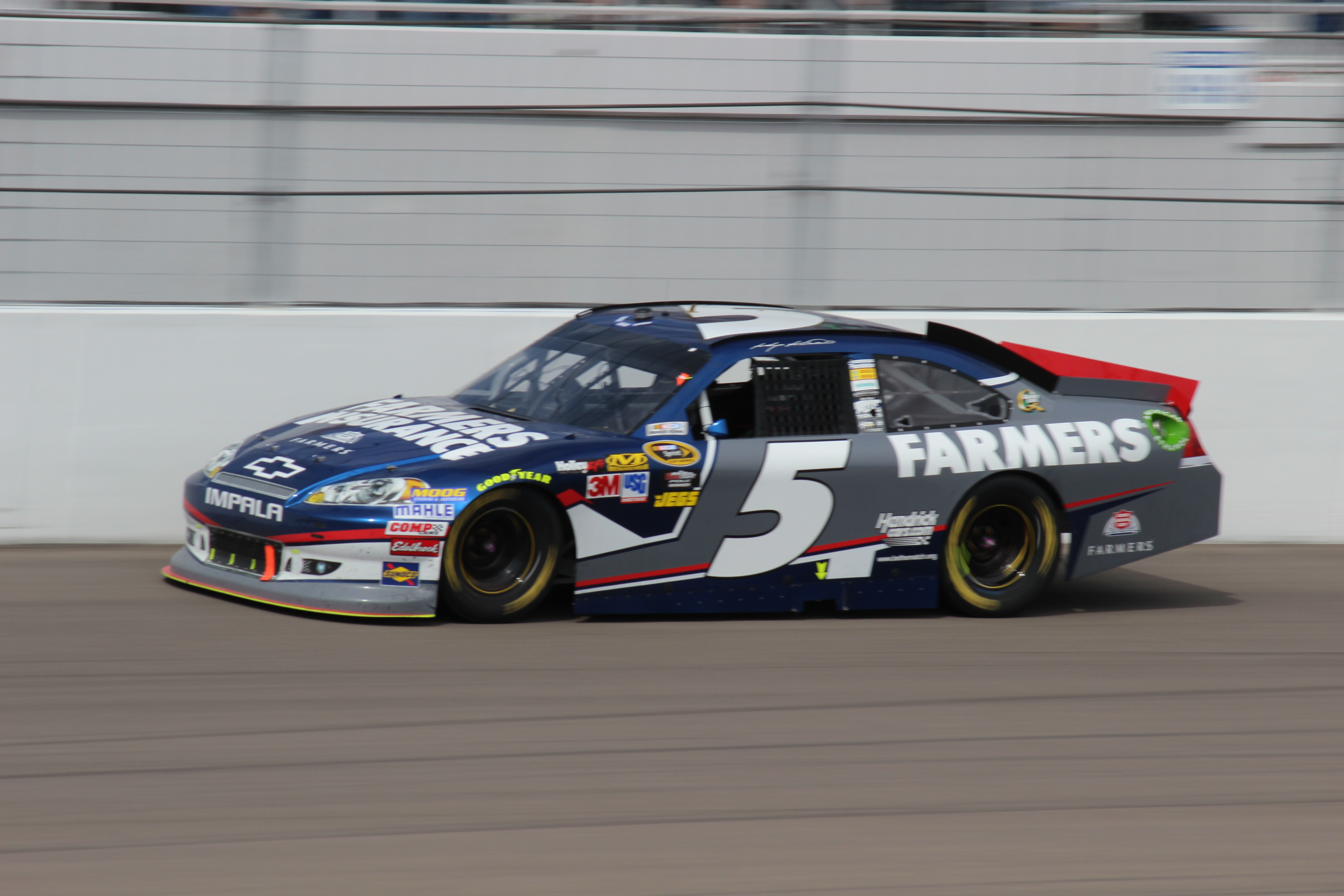
Kasey Kahne won his first race of the season at Charlotte in May

After an off-week, the teams returned to action at Texas. There, Greg Biffle held off Jimmie Johnson and grabbed his first win in 49 races. The next week at Kansas, Denny Hamlin held off a dominant Martin Truex Jr. to take his second win of 2012 under Darian Grubb. At Richmond, Carl Edwards dominated the race before a black flag on the restart knocked him out of contention. Tony Stewart held the point, but got caught up by a faulty final stop. Kyle Busch then inherited the lead to take his first win of 2012 and his fourth consecutive spring Richmond win. The series traveled to Talladega for its second superspeedway race of the year. After a flurry of late race cautions took out a number of contenders, Brad Keselowski, with help from Kyle Busch, drove past Daytona 500 winner Matt Kenseth and Greg Biffle to take his second win of 2012. At the Southern 500, Jimmie Johnson dominated the field, but stayed on track during the final round of pit stops on the advice of Chad Knaus and held off Denny Hamlin for his first win of 2012 and Rick Hendrick's 200th victory. At the Sprint All-Star Race, Dale Earnhardt Jr. and A. J. Allmendinger raced into the main event via finishing 1–2 in the Sprint Showdown, while veteran Bobby Labonte won the fan vote to transfer in. A slow restart after the fourth segment by Matt Kenseth allowed Jimmie Johnson to cruise to his third All-Star win. The following was NASCAR's longest race, the Coke 600. Greg Biffle once again had the dominant intermediate car, but Kasey Kahne drove past Denny Hamlin and teammate Dale Earnhardt Jr. on the final restart to take his first win of 2012 with Hendrick Motorsports.

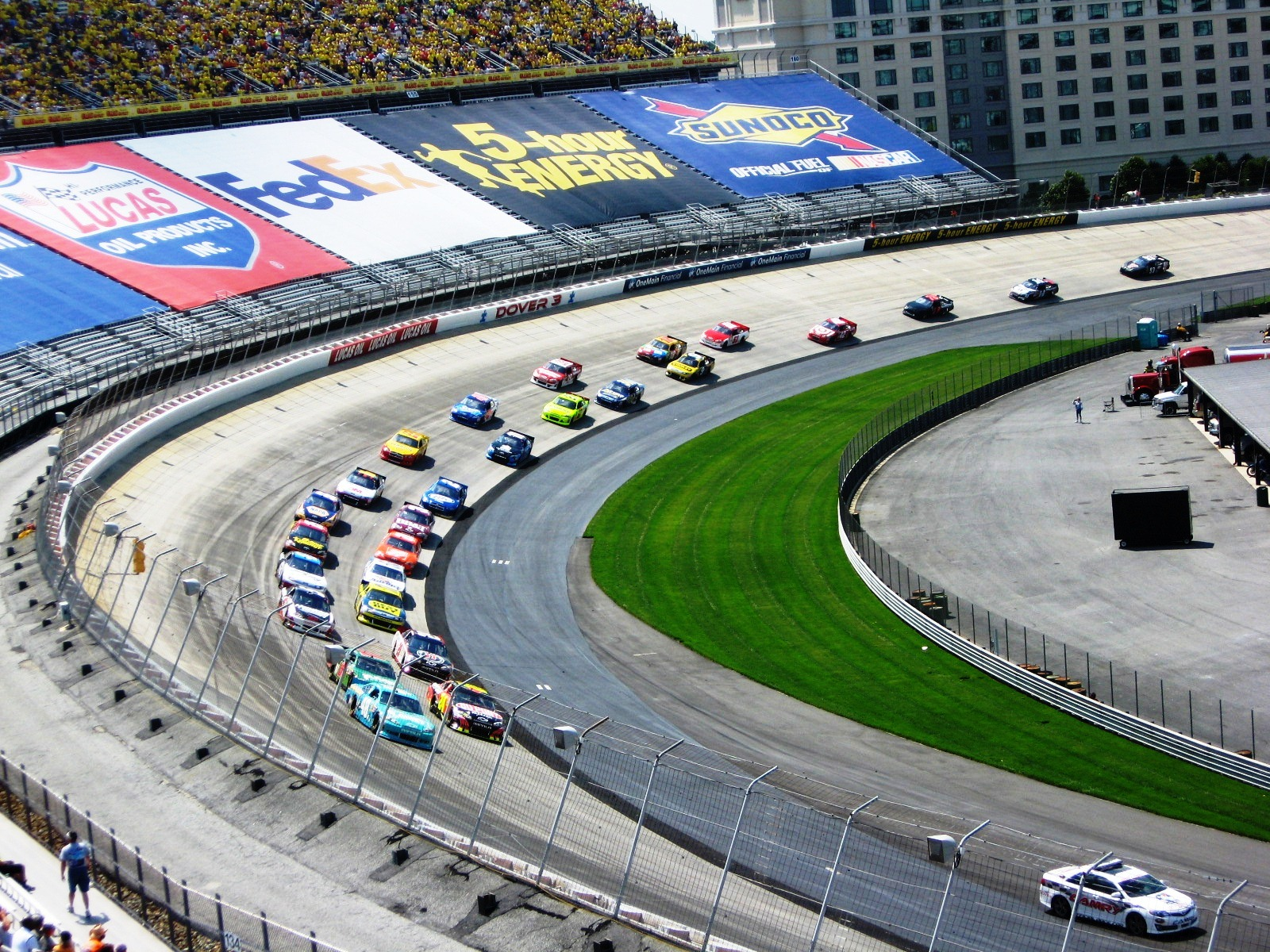
2012 FedEx 400 at Dover International Speedway going under green flag

The series moved to Dover, where Jimmie Johnson dominated the field and cruised to his second win of the year. At the repaved Pocono, polesitter Joey Logano pulled a bump and run on former mentor Mark Martin to score his first win since 2009. At a repaved Michigan, drivers had to contend with a new tire as well as a pre-race shower. Once the race got underway, Dale Earnhardt Jr. dominated the race, leading 95 laps en route to his first victory in 143 races. At Sonoma, Clint Bowyer dominated the race, leading 71 laps and holding off Tony Stewart and Kurt Busch on a green-white-checkered finish to win his first race with Michael Waltrip Racing. In the series return to Kentucky, Kyle Busch dominated the early stages of the race until a broken shock took him out of contention. A late crash by Ryan Newman set up a fuel mileage race, and Brad Keselowski took the lead and preserved enough fuel for his third win of the year. On the return trip to Daytona, the Roush duo of Matt Kenseth and Greg Biffle dominated the race. A late push from Kasey Kahne handed Tony Stewart the lead as well as his fourth Daytona victory. The next stop was Loudon, where Denny Hamlin dominated the race, leading 150 laps. However, a decision to take four tires on a final stop dropped him to 13th. Kasey Kahne held the lead on the final restart and held off a surging Hamlin for his second win of 2012.

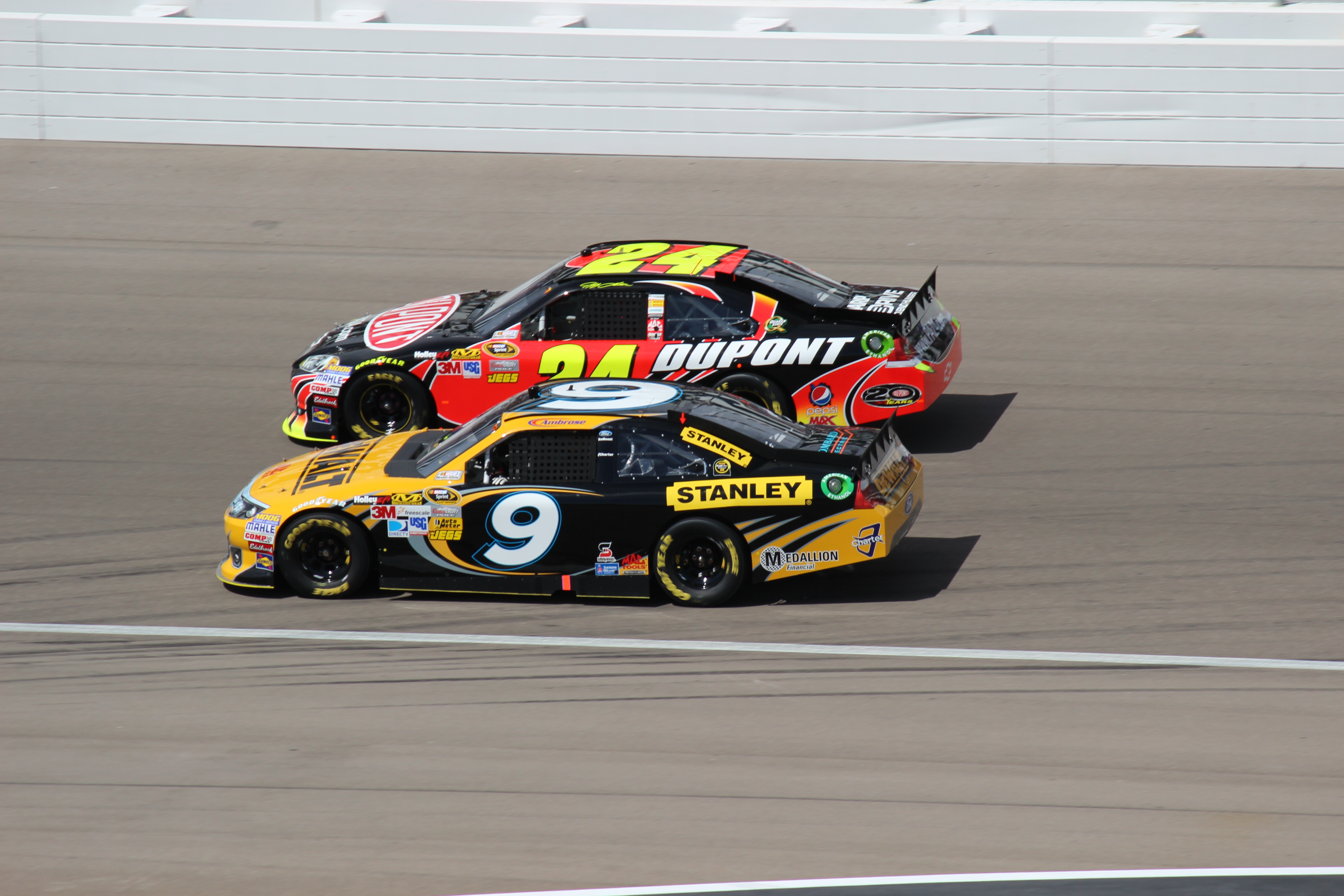
Marcos Ambrose, shown here with Jeff Gordon at Las Vegas, won his second career race at Watkins Glen.

After a week off, the Cup Series returned to action at the famed Brickyard. Denny Hamlin dominated the initial stages of the race, but lost the lead to Jimmie Johnson after a cycle of green flag pit stops on lap 30. From there, Johnson took over the lead and easily held off Kyle Busch for his 4th Brickyard victory. Moving for its return trip to Pocono, rain plagued the race all day, wreaking havoc on championship contenders. However, Jeff Gordon moved through a late wreck to shake off the bad luck and take his first win of the year; the race was called after 98 laps due to a second rainstorm that hit the circuit after earlier rain had delayed the start. The Cup Series made its final road course stop of the season at Watkins Glen. In a repeat of last year's race, Kyle Busch, Brad Keselowski and Marcos Ambrose dominated the day, but Busch, appearing on his way to a second win, spun in the esses with 2 laps to go, while Ambrose pulled a bump and run on Keselowski in turn 9, holding him off for the win. The drivers returned to Michigan, where polesitter Mark Martin dominated the early stages of the race until he was involved in a wreck with Kasey Kahne. Jimmie Johnson took the lead in the late stages of the race until his engine blew on lap 195, setting up a green-white-checkered finish. Greg Biffle took the lead and held off Brad Keselowski and Kasey Kahne for his second win of 2012.

Heading to a newly configured Bristol, Joey Logano dominated the early stages of the race, leading 139 laps. The lead changed hands multiple times as pit strategy dictated the nature of the race. Carl Edwards in need of a victory, stayed out after a caution involving polesitter Casey Mears. However, he dropped through the pack, handing the lead over to Denny Hamlin, who held off Jimmie Johnson for his third win of the season. At Atlanta, the battle up front was contested between Kevin Harvick and Denny Hamlin. However, Martin Truex Jr. got out front until a late crash by Jamie McMurray brought the field down pit road, and Hamlin exiting first. Hamlin then held off Jeff Gordon on a green-white-checkered for a series high 4th win of the season. At the final regular season race at Richmond, the wild card contenders attempted to get into victory lane to make the Chase field. Denny Hamlin dominated the first half of the race, leading 202 laps. However, a caution for rain on lap 276 shuffled the running order significantly. Clint Bowyer inherited the lead on lap 312, stretching his fuel mileage and holding off Jeff Gordon for his second win of the season. Gordon, despite falling a lap down early on, rallied to leapfrog Kyle Busch for the second wild card position in the Chase.

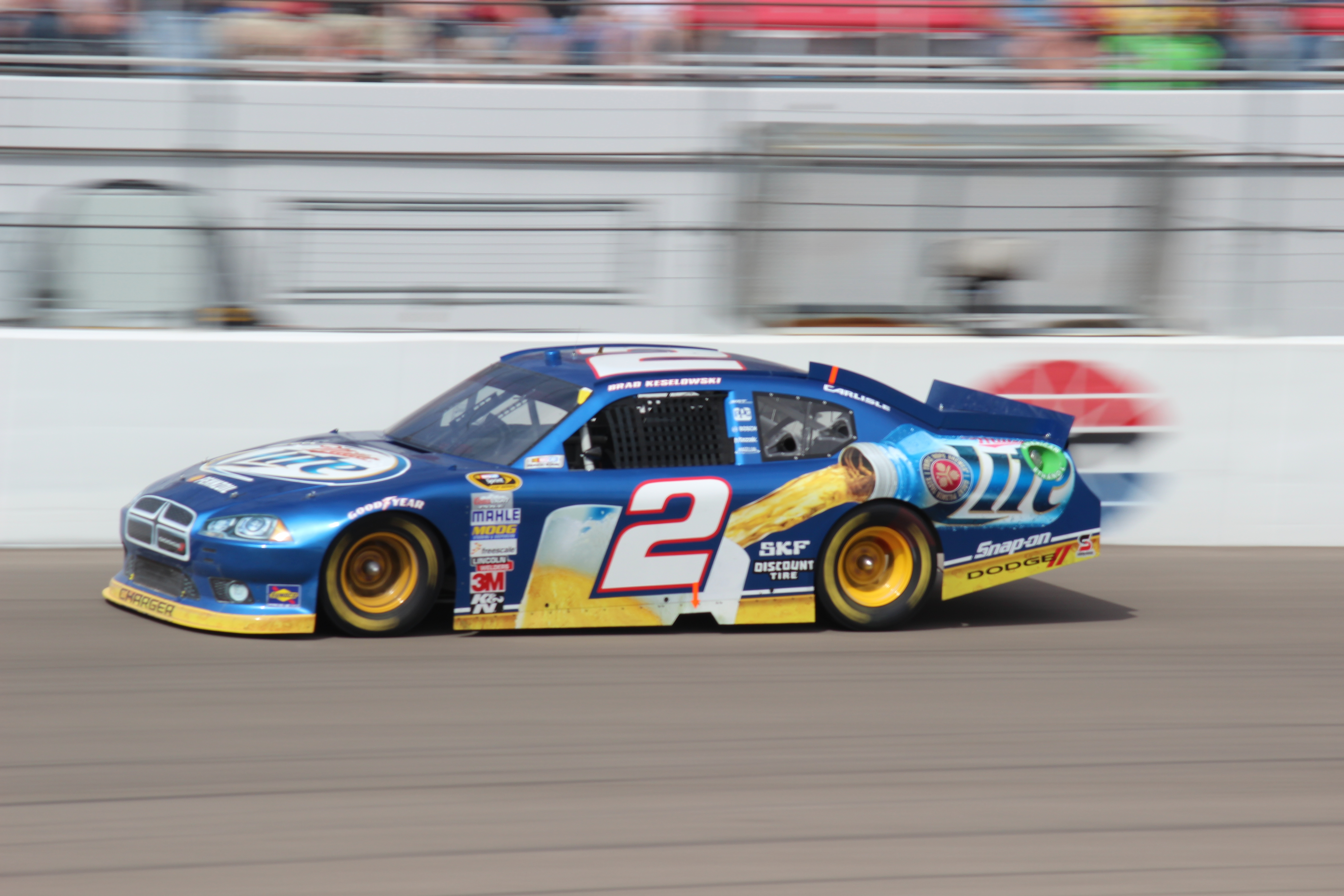
Brad Keselowski won the first race of the Chase for the Sprint Cup at Chicagoland

The Chase for the Sprint Cup kicked off at Chicagoland Speedway. Polesitter Jimmie Johnson dominated the race, leading 172 laps. However, Brad Keselowski got ahead of Johnson after the final round of pit stops, enabling Keselowski to pull away and score his fourth win of the season. At Loudon, Denny Hamlin backed up a promise he made on Twitter (later stating it was overblown) to win the race, and led 193 laps despite starting 32nd to take his fifth win of the season. The following week at Dover, the JGR duo of Kyle Busch and Denny Hamlin dominated the race. However, a lack of cautions in the race set up a fuel mileage race, forcing the duo to pit. June winner Jimmie Johnson attempted to take advantage, only to be forced to conserve fuel. Brad Keselowski inherited the point and managed to stretch his fuel to take his 5th win of the year as well as the points lead. The teams returned to Talladega, where a lack of cautions produced differing pit strategies between the teams. At the end, the race was about to come down to fuel mileage when leader Jamie McMurray spun with 6 to go. Matt Kenseth stayed out on track and stayed in front of the field when "The Big One" erupted, handing him his second win of 2012.

The Chase reached the halfway mark at Charlotte. Points leader Brad Keselowski dominated the race, looking to pad his points lead. However, Keselowski pitted one lap too late on his final stop and ran out of fuel on pit road, dashing his hopes for a win. Clint Bowyer, who pitted on lap 278, stretched his fuel mileage and held off Denny Hamlin for his third win of the season to tighten the points race. The series returned to Kansas, where a recent repave turned the race into a war of attrition. Matt Kenseth stayed out during the final caution and ran away from the field to pick up his third win of the season. The series headed back to Martinsville, where polesitter Jimmie Johnson dominated the race, capturing his 4th win of the season. At Texas, Johnson once again dominated from pole and held off a late charge from championship contender Brad Keselowski to take his second win in a row. The penultimate race at Phoenix was dominated by Kyle Busch. However, the championship race took a significant turn when points leader Johnson crashed out of the race. Bowyer who was third in the point standings was also knocked out of the championship contention after being intentionally wrecked by Jeff Gordon on lap 311. At the end of the race, winless Kevin Harvick would take the lead and capture his first win in 44 races. At the season finale in Homestead, the race once again came down to fuel mileage. Jimmie Johnson attempted to make the race on one less stop than his competitors, but was knocked out of contention for the win and the Championship when the drive train failed. Teammate Jeff Gordon took the point on lap 254 and used Johnson's strategy to take his first win at Homestead, while points leader Brad Keselowski finished 15th to secure his and Roger Penske's first Sprint Cup Championship.

== Results and standings ==
=== Races ===
No.	Race	Pole position	Most laps led	Winning driver	Manufacturer	Report
	Budweiser Shootout	Martin Truex Jr.	Greg Biffle	Kyle Busch	Toyota	Report
	Gatorade Duels	Carl Edwards	Denny Hamlin	Tony Stewart	Chevrolet	Report
	Gatorade Duels	Greg Biffle	Greg Biffle	Matt Kenseth	Ford	Report
1	Daytona 500	Carl Edwards	Denny Hamlin	Matt Kenseth	Ford	Report
2	Subway Fresh Fit 500	Mark Martin	Kevin Harvick	Denny Hamlin	Toyota	Report
3	Kobalt Tools 400	Kasey Kahne	Tony Stewart	Tony Stewart	Chevrolet	Report
4	Food City 500	Greg Biffle	Brad Keselowski	Brad Keselowski	Dodge	Report
5	Auto Club 400	Denny Hamlin	Kyle Busch	Tony Stewart	Chevrolet	Report
6	Goody's Fast Relief 500	Kasey Kahne	Jeff Gordon	Ryan Newman	Chevrolet	Report
7	Samsung Mobile 500	Martin Truex Jr.	Jimmie Johnson	Greg Biffle	Ford	Report
8	STP 400	A. J. Allmendinger	Martin Truex Jr.	Denny Hamlin	Toyota	Report
9	Capital City 400	Mark Martin	Carl Edwards	Kyle Busch	Toyota	Report
10	Aaron's 499	Jeff Gordon	Matt Kenseth	Brad Keselowski	Dodge	Report
11	Bojangles' Southern 500	Greg Biffle	Jimmie Johnson	Jimmie Johnson	Chevrolet	Report
	NASCAR Sprint All-Star Race	Kyle Busch	Brad Keselowski	Jimmie Johnson	Chevrolet	Report
12	Coca-Cola 600	Aric Almirola	Greg Biffle	Kasey Kahne	Chevrolet	Report
13	FedEx 400	Mark Martin	Jimmie Johnson	Jimmie Johnson	Chevrolet	Report
14	Pocono 400	Joey Logano	Joey Logano	Joey Logano	Toyota	Report
15	Quicken Loans 400	Marcos Ambrose	Dale Earnhardt Jr.	Dale Earnhardt Jr.	Chevrolet	Report
16	Toyota/Save Mart 350	Marcos Ambrose	Clint Bowyer	Clint Bowyer	Toyota	Report
17	Quaker State 400	Jimmie Johnson	Kyle Busch	Brad Keselowski	Dodge	Report
18	Coke Zero 400	Matt Kenseth	Matt Kenseth	Tony Stewart	Chevrolet	Report
19	Lenox Industrial Tools 301	Kyle Busch	Denny Hamlin	Kasey Kahne	Chevrolet	Report
20	Brickyard 400	Denny Hamlin	Jimmie Johnson	Jimmie Johnson	Chevrolet	Report
21	Pennsylvania 400	Juan Pablo Montoya	Jimmie Johnson	Jeff Gordon	Chevrolet	Report
22	Finger Lakes 355 at The Glen	Juan Pablo Montoya	Kyle Busch	Marcos Ambrose	Ford	Report
23	Pure Michigan 400	Mark Martin	Mark Martin	Greg Biffle	Ford	Report
24	Irwin Tools Night Race	Casey Mears	Joey Logano	Denny Hamlin	Toyota	Report
25	AdvoCare 500	Tony Stewart	Denny Hamlin	Denny Hamlin	Toyota	Report
26	Federated Auto Parts 400	Dale Earnhardt Jr.	Denny Hamlin	Clint Bowyer	Toyota	Report
Chase for the Sprint Cup
27	GEICO 400	Jimmie Johnson	Jimmie Johnson	Brad Keselowski	Dodge	Report
28	Sylvania 300	Jeff Gordon	Denny Hamlin	Denny Hamlin	Toyota	Report
29	AAA 400	Denny Hamlin	Kyle Busch	Brad Keselowski	Dodge	Report
30	Good Sam Roadside Assistance 500	Kasey Kahne	Jamie McMurray	Matt Kenseth	Ford	Report
31	Bank of America 500	Greg Biffle	Brad Keselowski	Clint Bowyer	Toyota	Report
32	Hollywood Casino 400	Kasey Kahne	Matt Kenseth	Matt Kenseth	Ford	Report
33	Tums Fast Relief 500	Jimmie Johnson	Jimmie Johnson	Jimmie Johnson	Chevrolet	Report
34	AAA Texas 500	Jimmie Johnson	Jimmie Johnson	Jimmie Johnson	Chevrolet	Report
35	AdvoCare 500	Kyle Busch	Kyle Busch	Kevin Harvick	Chevrolet	Report
36	Ford EcoBoost 400	Joey Logano	Kyle Busch	Jeff Gordon	Chevrolet	Report

=== Drivers ===
(key) Bold – Pole position awarded by time. Italics – Pole position set by final practice results. * – Most laps led.

Pos.	Driver	DAY	PHO	LVS	BRI	CAL	MAR	TEX	KAN	RCH	TAL	DAR	CLT	DOV	POC	MCH	SON	KEN	DAY	NHA	IND	POC	GLN	MCH	BRI	ATL	RCH	CHI	NHA	DOV	TAL	CLT	KAN	MAR	TEX	PHO	HOM	Pts.
1	Brad Keselowski	32	5	32	1*	18	9	36	11	9	1	15	5	12	18	13	12	1	8	5	9	4	2	2	30	3	7	1	6	1	7	11*	8	6	2	6	15	2400
2	Clint Bowyer	11	30	6	4	13	10	17	36	7	6	11	13	5	6	7	1*	16	29	3	15	8	4	7	7	27	1	10	4	9	23	1	6	5	6	28	2	2361
3	Jimmie Johnson	42	4	2	9	10	12	2*	3	6	35	1*	11	1*	4	5	5	**6**	36	7	1*	14*	3	27	2	34	13	**2***	2	4	17	3	9	**1***	**1***	32	36	2360
4	Kasey Kahne	29	34	**19**	37	14	**38**	7	8	5	4	8	1	9	29	33	14	2	7	1	12	2	13	3	9	23	12	3	5	15	**12**	8	**4**	3	25	4	21	2345
5	Greg Biffle	3	3	3	**13**	6	13	1	5	18	5	**12**	4*	11	24	4	7	21	21	9	3	15	6	1	19	15	9	13	18	16	6	**4**	27	10	10	7	5	2332
6	Denny Hamlin	4*	1	20	20	**11**	6	12	1	4	23	2	2	18	5	34	35	3	25	2*	**6**	29	34	11	1	1*	18*	16	1*	**8**	14	2	13	33	20	2	24	2329
7	Matt Kenseth	1	13	22	2	16	4	5	4	11	3*	6	10	3	7	3	13	7	**3***	13	35	23	8	17	25	9	5	18	14	35	1	14	1*	14	4	14	18	2324
8	Kevin Harvick	7	2*	11	11	4	19	9	6	19	25	16	8	2	14	10	16	11	23	8	13	17	15	16	15	5	10	12	11	13	11	16	11	32	9	1	8	2321
9	Tony Stewart	16	22	1*	14	1	7	24	13	3	24	3	25	25	3	2	2	32	1	12	10	5	19	32	27	**22**	4	6	7	20	22	13	5	27	5	19	17	2311
10	Jeff Gordon	40	8	12	35	26	14*	4	21	23	**33**	35	7	13	19	6	6	5	12	6	5	1	21	28	3	2	2	35	**3**	2	2	18	10	7	14	30	1	2303
11	Martin Truex Jr.	12	7	17	3	8	5	**6**	2*	25	28	5	12	7	20	12	22	8	17	11	8	3	10	10	11	4	21	9	17	6	13	10	2	23	13	43	6	2299
12	Dale Earnhardt Jr.	2	14	10	15	3	3	10	7	2	9	17	6	4	8	1*	23	4	15	4	4	32	28	4	12	7	**14**	8	13	11	20			21	7	21	10	2245
Chase for the Sprint Cup cut-off
Pos.	Driver	DAY	PHO	LVS	BRI	CAL	MAR	TEX	KAN	RCH	TAL	DAR	CLT	DOV	POC	MCH	SON	KEN	DAY	NHA	IND	POC	GLN	MCH	BRI	ATL	RCH	CHI	NHA	DOV	TAL	CLT	KAN	MAR	TEX	PHO	HOM	Pts.
13	Kyle Busch	17	6	23	32	2*	36	11	10	1	2	4	3	29	30	32	17	10*	24	**16**	2	33	7*	13	6	6	16	4	28	7*	3	5	31	2	3	**3***	4*	1133
14	Ryan Newman	21	21	4	12	7	1	21	20	15	36	23	14	15	12	15	18	34	5	10	7	6	11	8	36	35	8	5	10	21	9	20	30	11	12	5	3	1051
15	Carl Edwards	**8**	17	5	39	5	11	8	9	10*	31	7	9	26	11	11	21	20	6	18	29	7	14	6	22	36	17	19	19	5	36	7	14	18	16	11	12	1030
16	Paul Menard	6	31	7	10	19	26	18	18	13	17	13	15	17	9	22	20	12	14	17	14	11	12	9	10	8	23	15	12	22	28	27	3	12	27	9	11	1006
17	Joey Logano	9	10	16	16	24	23	19	15	24	26	10	23	8	**1***	35	10	22	4	14	33	13	32	31	8*	18	30	7	8	10	32	9	19	16	11	27	**14**	965
18	Marcos Ambrose	13	32	13	36	21	15	20	16	22	14	9	32	10	13	**9**	**8**	13	30	19	20	10	1	5	5	17	15	27	24	18	27	33	12	24	32	18	13	950
19	Jeff Burton	5	33	14	6	22	22	29	22	31	10	18	19	22	15	21	11	24	2	21	32	22	30	19	33	12	6	24	15	27	10	28	28	22	19	13	19	883
20	Aric Almirola	33	12	24	19	25	8	22	23	26	12	19	**16**	6	28	17	28	26	19	28	19	19	18	20	35	32	26	17	23	19	19	12	29	4	15	16	7	868
21	Jamie McMurray	31	37	8	7	32	20	14	14	14	11	34	21	19	10	14	19	15	13	20	22	18	39	14	17	24	22	21	26	24	34*	17	15	17	18	23	20	868
22	Juan Pablo Montoya	36	11	25	8	17	21	16	12	12	32	24	20	28	17	8	34	14	28	25	21	**20**	**33**	26	13	21	20	23	22	26	38	19	16	20	34	12	28	810
23	Bobby Labonte	14	16	26	28	28	17	27	35	17	21	29	28	20	22	16	24	27	10	23	26	27	27	22	14	19	25	26	20	14	18	32	33	9	33	15	25	772
24	Regan Smith	24	20	15	24	20	16	23	24	27	40	14	17	27	16	28	32	33	34	26	18	9	9	29	16	14	24	34	16	17	5	38	7			24	30	747
25	Kurt Busch	39	15	35	18	9	33	13	17	28	20	21	27	24		30	3	19	35	24	36	30	31	30	28	13	28	32	25	23	39	21	25	15	8	8	9	735
26	Mark Martin	10	**9**	18		12		3	33	**8**		20	34	**14**	2	29					11	12		**35***		10	3	14		3		6	24		29	10	16	701
27	Travis Kvapil		19	39	27	29	27	38	25	30	16	32^{1}	29	23	26	26	36	17	16	30	37	25	24	15	18	26	27	31	31	29	8	25	17	31	23	20	26	638
28	David Ragan	43	25	21	23	31	24	35	30	32	7	28	35	21	27	23	27	29	26	34	28	28	22	23	32	28	32	22	29	30	4	34	20	26	28	33	31	622
29	Casey Mears	25	39	27	25	23	25	25	26	21	18	22	22	41	35	20	15	18	18	36	34	35	16	37	21	33	29	36	36	31	26	29	37	25	21	22	29	612
30	David Gilliland	23	28	33	26	30	28	31	27	36	13	25	26	40	23	27	26	28	31	27	27	21	20	18	20	31	31	28	32	32	15	23	23	30	35	36	33	605
31	Landon Cassill	22	35	36	29	36	29	30	34	20	34	26	18	38	43	18	31	25	32	29	25	26	23	25	24	20	19	29	27	36	30	26	18	19	26	25	27	598
32	A. J. Allmendinger	34	18	37	17	15	2	15	**32**	16	15	33	33	16	31	19	9	9														24	35	28	36			453
33	Dave Blaney	15	23	29	34	33	34	37	37	29	30	27	40	32	25	25	37	35	22	39	23		36	38	26	25	33	33		41	29	43	39	35	39	26	32	417
34	David Reutimann	26	36	31	21	27	35	26	29	33	22	36	DNQ	31	21			23	11	33		24		21			34		30		37	30		36		40	34	373
35	Brian Vickers				5		18										4			15			43		4				9					8				250
36	David Stremme	37	29	28	38	39	30	DNQ	38	37	39	39	38	33	DNQ	DNQ		36	39	35	24	34		34	37	39	37	39	35	DNQ	33	37	DNQ	40	DNQ	34	38	236
37	Michael McDowell	30	43	38	31	38	40	41	40	39	43	DNQ	36	42	34	38		38	43	40	DNQ		37		23	DNQ	41	43	37	38	31	31	43	39	38	38	41	187
38	J. J. Yeley	DNQ	26	43	30	35	37	33	31	DNQ	DNQ	37	DNQ	34	36	37	33	DNQ	40	43	39	40	40	DNQ	DNQ	41	DNQ	DNQ	41	34		42	42	DNQ	42	DNQ	35	166
39	Josh Wise **(R)**		38	40	43	37	41	39	39	38	42	43	43	DNQ	42	42	30	37	38	37	40	37	38	40	38	DNQ	42	38	DNQ	37	43	DNQ	DNQ	38	37	37	40	147
40	Ken Schrader			30	33	32	32									31		31		31	30				42		35							29	31		37	146
41	Stephen Leicht **(R)**									35		DNQ	39	35	33		41	41	42	32	31	DNQ	26	DNQ	40	DNQ	36		34					34	DNQ	35	DNQ	126
42	Scott Speed						DNQ	43		43		42	37	43			25	39			38		17		DNQ	37		41	38	40		40	34	37	30			124
43	Michael Waltrip	DNQ									19							30	9												25							94
44	Terry Labonte	18									29								20												16							94
45	Tony Raines	19					DNQ	34	DNQ		38				32	36						38							40									71
46	Scott Riggs		42	DNQ	41	41	42	42	43	DNQ		DNQ	DNQ	37	40	41		43		41	41	43		41	41	40	39	DNQ	DNQ	42		DNQ	Wth	42			42	56
47	Brendan Gaughan		27	34	22	43																																50
48	Boris Said																29						25															34
49	Bill Elliott	DNQ									37								37																			14
50	Hermie Sadler						31																															13
51	Mike Olsen																												33									11
52	Robby Gordon	41	41	DNQ	Wth	DNQ											39																					11
53	Mike Skinner											41^{1}						DNQ			42	41		39														10
54	Kelly Bires																			42					DNQ				43	DNQ			38		DNQ			9
55	Tomy Drissi																38																					6
56	Stacy Compton							DNQ							39	DNQ																						5
57	David Mayhew																40																					4
58	Patrick Long																						42															2
	Brian Simo																DNQ																					–
	Mark Green																										DNQ											–
Ineligible for Sprint Cup driver points
Pos.	Driver	DAY	PHO	LVS	BRI	CAL	MAR	TEX	KAN	RCH	TAL	DAR	CLT	DOV	POC	MCH	SON	KEN	DAY	NHA	IND	POC	GLN	MCH	BRI	ATL	RCH	CHI	NHA	DOV	TAL	CLT	KAN	MAR	TEX	PHO	HOM	Pts.
	Sam Hornish Jr.								19										33	22	16	16	5	12	34	11	11	11	21	25	24	15	26	13	17	31	22	–
	Trevor Bayne	35		9				28			8		24			43			27		17			24		16		20			21	22	21		22		23	–
	Ricky Stenhouse Jr.	20																												12		35					39	–
	Danica Patrick	38										31	30												29	29		25		28			32		24	17		–
	Timmy Hill **(R)**		DNQ	42	DNQ	DNQ																									42	36	22			29		–^{2}
	Mike Bliss		24			40	DNQ	40	42	42		DNQ	DNQ	36	38	39		42		DNQ	43	39			43	DNQ	40	42		DNQ		39	36	DNQ	41	41	43	–
	Austin Dillon															24																						–
	Robert Richardson Jr.	DNQ									27								DNQ												35							–
	Elliott Sadler	27																																				–
	Joe Nemechek	28	40	41	40	DNQ	39	DNQ	41	41	41	40	41	39	37	40	43	40	41	38	DNQ	36	29	36	39	43	38	40	39	39	41	DNQ	40	41	40	39	DNQ	–
	Reed Sorenson				42	42	43	32	28	34		30		30	41						DNQ	42		42	DNQ	42	43	DNQ	42	43		41	41	43	43		DNQ	–
	T. J. Bell												31											33		30		30		33								–
	Jason Leffler																						35	43	31	38		DNQ	DNQ	DNQ						42	DNQ	–
	Jason White																					31																–
	Cole Whitt									40		38	42	DNQ														37		DNQ	40	DNQ	DNQ					–
	Chris Cook																42						41															–^{2}
	Kenny Wallace	DNQ																																				–
	Mike Wallace	DNQ																																				–
	Tim Andrews								DNQ																													–
	Jeff Green								DNQ																				DNQ									–
Pos.	Driver	DAY	PHO	LVS	BRI	CAL	MAR	TEX	KAN	RCH	TAL	DAR	CLT	DOV	POC	MCH	SON	KEN	DAY	NHA	IND	POC	GLN	MCH	BRI	ATL	RCH	CHI	NHA	DOV	TAL	CLT	KAN	MAR	TEX	PHO	HOM	Pts.
	References																																					

- ^{1} – Post entry, driver and owner did not score points.
- ^{2} – Hill and Cook started the season running for Cup series points but switched to Nationwide after California (Hill) and Watkins Glen (Cook).

=== Manufacturer ===
Pos	Manufacturer	Wins	Points
1	Chevrolet	15	**249**
2	Toyota	10	**213**
3	Ford	6	**174**
4	Dodge	5	**156**

== See also ==
- 2012 NASCAR Nationwide Series
- 2012 NASCAR Camping World Truck Series
- 2012 NASCAR K&N Pro Series East
- 2012 ARCA Racing Series
- 2012 NASCAR Whelen Modified Tour
- 2012 NASCAR Whelen Southern Modified Tour
- 2012 NASCAR Canadian Tire Series
- 2012 NASCAR Toyota Series
- 2012 NASCAR Stock V6 Series
- 2012 Racecar Euro Series
