= 2012 Sylvania 300 =

Race details
- Race 28 of 36 in the 2012 NASCAR Sprint Cup Series
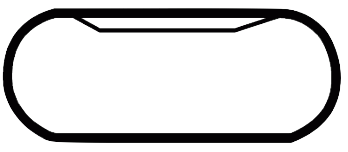
- Layout of New Hampshire Motor Speedway
- Date: September 23, 2012
- Location: New Hampshire Motor Speedway in Loudon, New Hampshire
- Course: Permanent racing facility
- Course length: 1.058 miles (1.703 km)
- Distance: 300 laps, 317.4 mi (510.805 km)
- Weather: Mild with temperatures approaching 72 °F (22 °C); wind speeds up to 13 miles per hour (21 km/h)

Pole position
Driver	Jeff Gordon	Hendrick Motorsports
- Time: 28.232

Most laps led
Driver	Denny Hamlin	Joe Gibbs Racing
- Laps: 193

Winner
No. 11	Denny Hamlin	Joe Gibbs Racing

Television in the United States
- Network: ESPN
- Announcers: Allen Bestwick, Dale Jarrett and Andy Petree

The 2012 Sylvania 300 was a NASCAR Sprint Cup Series stock car race held on September 23, 2012 at New Hampshire Motor Speedway in Loudon, New Hampshire. Contested over 300 laps, it was the twenty-eighth in the 2012 NASCAR Sprint Cup Series, as well as the second race in the ten-race Chase for the Sprint Cup, which ends the season. Denny Hamlin of Joe Gibbs Racing won the race, his fifth of the season. Jimmie Johnson finished second and Jeff Gordon was third.

== Standings after the race ==
Drivers' Championship standings
Pos	Driver	Points
1	Jimmie Johnson	2,096
2	Brad Keselowski	2,095
3	Denny Hamlin	2,089
4	Tony Stewart	2,086
5	Kasey Kahne	2,081
6	Clint Bowyer	2,081
7	Dale Earnhardt Jr.	2,070
8	Kevin Harvick	2,065
9	Greg Biffle	2,063
10	Martin Truex Jr.	2,062
11	Matt Kenseth	2,061
12	Jeff Gordon	2,051

Manufacturers' Championship standings
Pos	Manufacturer	Points
1	Chevrolet	185
2	Toyota	159
3	Ford	131
4	Dodge	119

- Note: Only the first twelve positions are included for the driver standings.

Previous race: 2012 GEICO 400	Sprint Cup Series; 2012 season	Next race: 2012 AAA 400
