= 2012 AAA 400 =

Race details
- Race 29 of 36 in the 2012 NASCAR Sprint Cup Series
- Date: September 30, 2012
- Location: Dover International Speedway in Dover, Delaware
- Course: Permanent racing facility
- Course length: 1 miles (1.6 km)
- Distance: 400 laps, 400 mi (643.737 km)
- Weather: Temperatures reaching up to 71.8 °F (22.1 °C); wind speeds approaching 12 miles per hour (19 km/h)

Pole position
Driver	Denny Hamlin	Joe Gibbs Racing
- Time: 22.599

Most laps led
Driver	Kyle Busch	Joe Gibbs Racing
- Laps: 302

Winner
No. 2	Brad Keselowski	Penske Racing

Television in the United States
- Network: ESPN
- Announcers: Allen Bestwick, Dale Jarrett and Andy Petree

The 2012 AAA 400 was a NASCAR Cup Series stock car race held on September 30, 2012 at Dover International Speedway in Dover, Delaware. Contested over 400 laps, it was the twenty-ninth in the 2012 NASCAR Sprint Cup Series, as well as the third race in the ten-race Chase for the Sprint Cup, which ends the season. Brad Keselowski of Team Penske won the race; this would ultimately be the last victory for a Dodge-based team in the Sprint Cup Series, as the season is the final season for Dodge in the Cup Series until 2027.

== Standings after the race ==
Drivers' Championship standings
	Pos.	Driver	Points
1	1	Brad Keselowski	2,142
1	2	Jimmie Johnson	2,137 (–5)
	3	Denny Hamlin	2,126 (–16)
2	4	Clint Bowyer	2,117 (–25)
1	5	Tony Stewart	2,110 (–32)
1	6	Kasey Kahne	2,110 (–32)
	7	Dale Earnhardt Jr.	2,103 (–39)
2	8	Martin Truex Jr.	2,100 (–42)
1	9	Kevin Harvick	2,096 (–46)
2	10	Jeff Gordon	2,094 (–48)
2	11	Greg Biffle	2,091 (–51)
1	12	Matt Kenseth	2,070 (–72)

Manufacturers' Championship standings
Pos.	Manufacturer	Points
1	Chevrolet	197
2	Toyota	172 (–25)
3	Ford	138 (–59)
4	Dodge	131 (–66)

- Note: Only the first twelve positions are included for the driver standings.

Previous race: 2012 Sylvania 300	Sprint Cup Series; 2012 season	Next race: 2012 Good Sam Roadside Assistance 500
