= 2012 Federated Auto Parts 400 =

Race details
- Race 26 of 36 in the 2012 NASCAR Sprint Cup Series
- Richmond International Speedway
- Date: Sept 8-9, 2012
- Location: Richmond International Raceway, Richmond, Virginia
- Course: Permanent racing facility
- Course length: 0.75 miles (1.2 km)
- Distance: 400 laps, 300 mi (482.803 km)

Pole position
Driver	Dale Earnhardt Jr.	Hendrick Motorsports
- Time: 21.256

Most laps led
Driver	Denny Hamlin	Joe Gibbs Racing
- Laps: 199

Winner
No. 15	Clint Bowyer	Michael Waltrip Racing

Television in the United States
- Network: ABC
- Announcers: Allen Bestwick, Dale Jarrett and Andy Petree

The 2012 Federated Auto Parts 400 was a NASCAR Sprint Cup Series stock car race held on September 8, 2012 at Richmond International Raceway in Richmond, Virginia. Contested over 400 laps, it was the twenty-sixth and final race leading into the Chase for the Sprint Cup in the 2012 Sprint Cup Series season.

Clint Bowyer of Michael Waltrip Racing won the race, his second of the season. Jeff Gordon finished second to clinch the second wild card spot in the Chase, and Mark Martin finished third.

== Report ==
=== Background ===
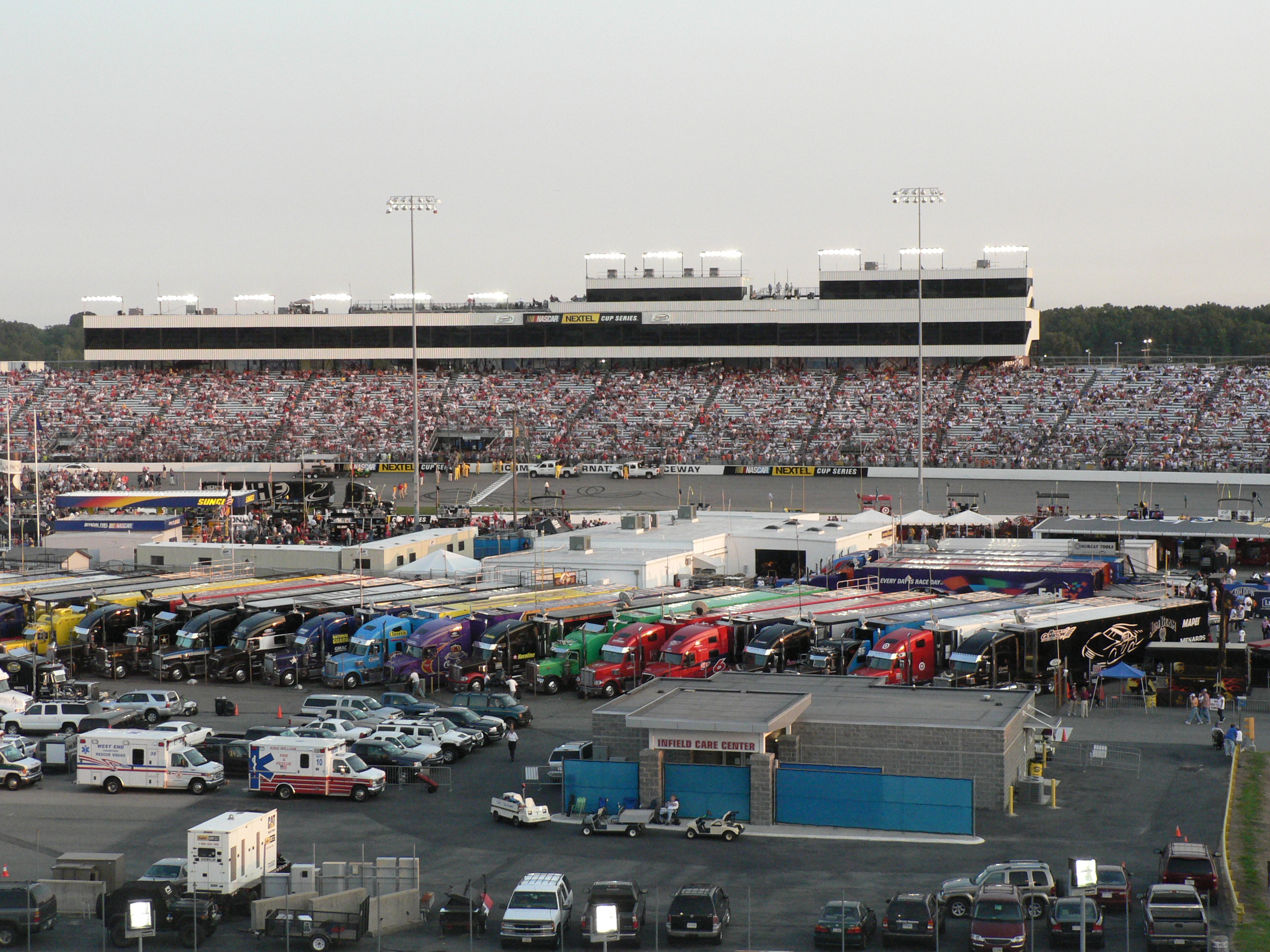
Richmond International Raceway, the race track where the race was held.

Richmond International Raceway is one of five short tracks to hold NASCAR races; the others are Bristol Motor Speedway, Dover International Speedway, Martinsville Speedway, and Phoenix International Raceway. The NASCAR race makes use of the track's standard configuration, a four-turn short track oval that is 0.75 miles (1.21 km) long. The track's turns are banked at fourteen degrees. The front stretch, the location of the finish line, is banked at eight degrees while the back stretch has two degrees of banking. The racetrack has seats for 94,063 spectators.

=== Race ===
==== Start ====
===== First half =====
The race was set to start at 7:43 p.m. EDT but the start was delayed 90 minutes, and the cars were running under caution speed, Jeff Gordon was leading when the race restarted on lap 8, The second caution came out on lap 48, this was a planned competition caution, The race restarted on lap 52, and the third caution then came out on lap 53 for a one-car spin in the back straightaway (David Ragan), the race restarted on lap 57, and a couple of laps later, the fourth caution came out for rain on lap 139, by lap 153, the cars were brought down pit road the race was red flagged as rain returned again. After a delay of fifty-one minutes and 45 seconds, the cars started rolling again, and the race restarted on lap 156.

===== Second half =====
The fifth caution came out on lap 235 when Clint Bowyer spun out in the back straightaway, the race restarted on lap 239, The race was under longer green flag runs until the end, Clint Bowyer stretched his fuel mileage and despite a late charge from Jeff Gordon, the lead was too big to overcome for Gordon, and Bowyer would score his second win in Richmond, as well as the second win in the season. Gordon rallied back from going one lap down to finish 2nd, and knocked Kyle Busch out of the Chase by 3 points (Kyle finished 16th). Mark Martin clinched third.

== Results ==
=== Qualifying ===
Grid	No.	Driver	Team	Manufacturer	Time	Speed
1	88	Dale Earnhardt Jr.	Hendrick Motorsports	Chevrolet	21.256	127.023
2	24	Jeff Gordon	Hendrick Motorsports	Chevrolet	21.263	126.981
3	78	Regan Smith	Furniture Row Racing	Chevrolet	21.275	126.910
4	15	Clint Bowyer	Michael Waltrip Racing	Toyota	21.292	126.808
5	48	Jimmie Johnson	Hendrick Motorsports	Chevrolet	21.295	126.790
6	55	Mark Martin	Michael Waltrip Racing	Toyota	21.296	126.784
7	11	Denny Hamlin	Joe Gibbs Racing	Toyota	21.315	126.671
8	20	Joey Logano	Joe Gibbs Racing	Toyota	21.327	126.600
9	56	Martin Truex Jr.	Michael Waltrip Racing	Toyota	21.335	126.553
10	2	Brad Keselowski	Penske Racing	Dodge	21.336	126.547
11	22	Sam Hornish Jr.	Penske Racing	Dodge	21.359	126.410
12	83	Landon Cassill	BK Racing	Toyota	21.405	126.139
13	29	Kevin Harvick	Richard Childress Racing	Chevrolet	21.415	126.080
14	39	Ryan Newman	Stewart–Haas Racing	Chevrolet	21.416	126.074
15	18	Kyle Busch	Joe Gibbs Racing	Toyota	21.423	126.033
16	99	Carl Edwards	Roush Fenway Racing	Ford	21.423	126.033
17	17	Matt Kenseth	Roush Fenway Racing	Ford	21.433	125.974
18	43	Aric Almirola	Richard Petty Motorsports	Ford	21.439	125.939
19	98	Michael McDowell	Phil Parsons Racing	Ford	21.449	125.880
20	31	Jeff Burton	Richard Childress Racing	Chevrolet	21.455	125.845
21	5	Kasey Kahne	Hendrick Motorsports	Chevrolet	21.476	125.722
22	9	Marcos Ambrose	Richard Petty Motorsports	Ford	21.481	125.692
23	16	Greg Biffle	Roush Fenway Racing	Ford	21.497	125.599
24	42	Juan Pablo Montoya	Earnhardt Ganassi Racing	Chevrolet	21.506	125.546
25	27	Paul Menard	Richard Childress Racing	Chevrolet	21.512	125.511
26	1	Jamie McMurray	Earnhardt Ganassi Racing	Chevrolet	21.533	125.389
27	34	David Ragan	Front Row Motorsports	Ford	21.533	125.389
28	14	Tony Stewart	Stewart–Haas Racing	Chevrolet	21.536	125.371
29	47	Bobby Labonte	JTG Daugherty Racing	Toyota	21.541	125.342
30	51	Kurt Busch	Phoenix Racing	Chevrolet	21.561	125.226
31	30	David Stremme	Inception Motorsports	Toyota	21.591	125.052
32	93	Travis Kvapil	BK Racing	Toyota	21.602	124.988
33	36	Dave Blaney	Tommy Baldwin Racing	Chevrolet	21.619	124.890
34	87	Joe Nemechek	NEMCO Motorsports	Toyota	21.621	124.879
35	38	David Gilliland	Front Row Motorsports	Ford	21.644	124.746
36	33	Stephen Leicht	Circle Sport Racing	Chevrolet	21.648	124.723
37	10	David Reutimann	Tommy Baldwin Racing	Chevrolet	21.651	124.706
38	23	Scott Riggs	R3 Motorsports	Chevrolet	21.680	124.539
39	32	Ken Schrader	FAS Lane Racing	Ford	21.703	124.407
40	19	Mike Bliss	Humphrey Smith Racing	Toyota	21.719	124.315
41	26	Josh Wise	Front Row Motorsports	Ford	21.746	124.161
42	13	Casey Mears	Germain Racing	Chevrolet	21.759	124.087
43	91	Reed Sorenson	Humphrey Smith Racing	Chevrolet	21.813	123.779
Failed to Qualify
	37	J. J. Yeley	Max Q Motorsports	Chevrolet	21.868	123.468
	0	Mark Green	SS Motorsports	Toyota	22.321	120.962

Previous race: 2012 AdvoCare 500	Sprint Cup Series; 2012 season	Next race: 2012 GEICO 400
