= 2012 Samsung Mobile 500 =

Race details
- Race 7 of 36 in the 2012 NASCAR Sprint Cup Series
- Date: April 14, 2012
- Location: Texas Motor Speedway in Fort Worth, Texas
- Course: Permanent racing facility
- Course length: 1.5 miles (2.4 km)
- Distance: 334 laps, 501 mi (806.3 km)
- Weather: Scattered thunderstorms; wind out of the south at 21 miles per hour (34 km/h).
- Average speed: 160.577 miles per hour (258.424 km/h)

Pole position
Driver	Martin Truex Jr.	Michael Waltrip Racing
- Time: 28.366

Most laps led
Driver	Jimmie Johnson	Hendrick Motorsports
- Laps: 156

Winner
No. 16	Greg Biffle	Roush–Fenway Racing

Television in the United States
- Network: Fox Broadcasting Company
- Announcers: Mike Joy, Darrell Waltrip and Larry McReynolds

The 2012 Samsung Mobile 500 was a NASCAR Sprint Cup Series race held on April 14, 2012, at Texas Motor Speedway in Fort Worth, Texas. Contested over 334 laps, it was the seventh race of the 2012 season. Greg Biffle of Roush–Fenway Racing took his first win of the season, while Jimmie Johnson finished second and Mark Martin finished third.

== Report ==
=== Background ===
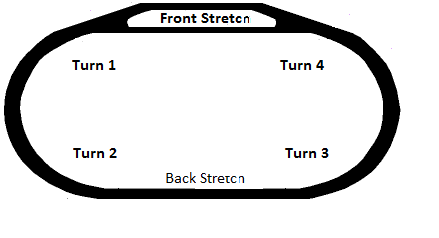
Texas Motor Speedway, the race track where the race was held.

Texas Motor Speedway, is one of ten intermediate to hold NASCAR races. The standard track is a four-turn quad-oval track that is 1.5 miles (2.4 km) long. The track's turns are banked at twenty-four degrees, while the front stretch, the location of the finish line, is five degrees. The back stretch, opposite of the front, also has a five degree banking. The racetrack has seats for 191,122 spectators.

Before the race, Greg Biffle led the Drivers' Championship with 226 points, and Dale Earnhardt Jr. stood in second with 220. Tony Stewart, Matt Kenseth, Kevin Harvick and Martin Truex Jr. followed in the next four positions with 214 points. Denny Hamlin with 210 points, was eight points ahead of Ryan Newman and 18 ahead of Clint Bowyer in eighth and ninth. Jimmie Johnson, with 189, was ten points ahead of Carl Edwards in eleventh. Brad Keselowski completed the first twelve positions with 175 points, 51 points behind Biffle. In the Manufacturers' Championship, Chevrolet was leading with 42 points, nine points ahead of Ford. Toyota, with 30 points, was three points ahead of Dodge in the battle for third. Kenseth was the race's defending race winner after winning it in 2011.

=== Entry list ===
(R) - Denotes rookie driver.

(i) - Denotes driver who is ineligible for series driver points.

No.	Driver	Team	Manufacturer
1	Jamie McMurray	Earnhardt Ganassi Racing	Chevrolet
2	Brad Keselowski	Penske Racing	Dodge
5	Kasey Kahne	Hendrick Motorsports	Chevrolet
9	Marcos Ambrose	Richard Petty Motorsports	Ford
10	David Reutimann	Tommy Baldwin Racing	Chevrolet
11	Denny Hamlin	Joe Gibbs Racing	Toyota
13	Casey Mears	Germain Racing	Ford
14	Tony Stewart	Stewart–Haas Racing	Chevrolet
15	Clint Bowyer	Michael Waltrip Racing	Toyota
16	Greg Biffle	Roush Fenway Racing	Ford
17	Matt Kenseth	Roush Fenway Racing	Ford
18	Kyle Busch	Joe Gibbs Racing	Toyota
19	Mike Bliss (i)	Humphrey Smith Racing	Toyota
20	Joey Logano	Joe Gibbs Racing	Toyota
21	Trevor Bayne (i)	Wood Brothers Racing	Ford
22	A. J. Allmendinger	Penske Racing	Dodge
23	Scott Riggs	R3 Motorsports	Chevrolet
24	Jeff Gordon	Hendrick Motorsports	Chevrolet
26	Josh Wise (R)	Front Row Motorsports	Ford
27	Paul Menard	Richard Childress Racing	Chevrolet
29	Kevin Harvick	Richard Childress Racing	Chevrolet
30	David Stremme	Inception Motorsports	Toyota
31	Jeff Burton	Richard Childress Racing	Chevrolet
32	Reed Sorenson (i)	FAS Lane Racing	Ford
33	Tony Raines	Circle Sport	Chevrolet
34	David Ragan	Front Row Motorsports	Ford
36	Dave Blaney	Tommy Baldwin Racing	Chevrolet
38	David Gilliland	Front Row Motorsports	Ford
39	Ryan Newman	Stewart–Haas Racing	Chevrolet
42	Juan Pablo Montoya	Earnhardt Ganassi Racing	Chevrolet
43	Aric Almirola	Richard Petty Motorsports	Ford
47	Bobby Labonte	JTG Daugherty Racing	Toyota
48	Jimmie Johnson	Hendrick Motorsports	Chevrolet
49	J. J. Yeley	Robinson-Blakeney Racing	Toyota
51	Kurt Busch	Phoenix Racing	Chevrolet
55	Mark Martin	Michael Waltrip Racing	Toyota
56	Martin Truex Jr.	Michael Waltrip Racing	Toyota
74	Stacy Compton	Turn One Racing	Chevrolet
78	Regan Smith	Furniture Row Racing	Chevrolet
83	Landon Cassill	BK Racing	Toyota
87	Joe Nemechek (i)	NEMCO Motorsports	Toyota
88	Dale Earnhardt Jr.	Hendrick Motorsports	Chevrolet
93	Travis Kvapil	BK Racing	Toyota
98	Michael McDowell	Phil Parsons Racing	Ford
99	Carl Edwards	Roush Fenway Racing	Ford
Official entry list

=== Practice and qualifying ===
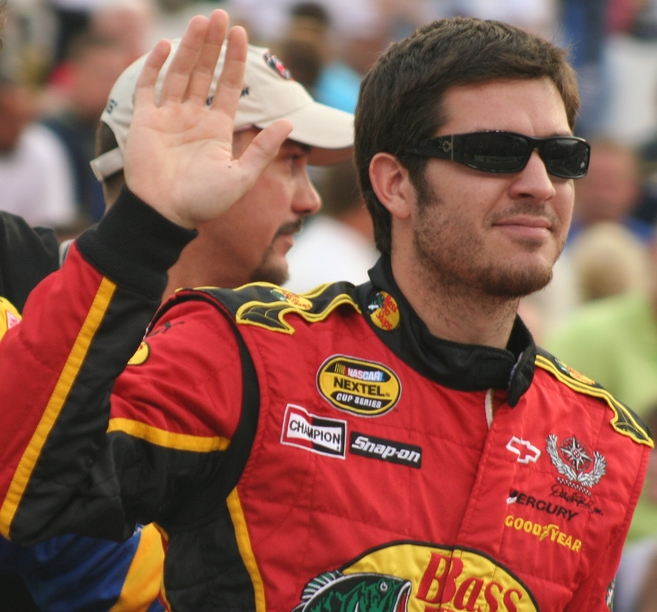
Martin Truex Jr., shown here in 2007, won the pole position for Michael Waltrip Racing

Two practice sessions were held before the race; the first on April 12, 2012 which lasted 120 minutes. The second and final practice session was held on the following day and lasted 90 minutes. Mark Martin was quickest with a time of 28.507 seconds in the first session, less than four-hundredths of a second faster than Biffle. Harvick was just off Biffle's pace, followed by A. J. Allmendinger, Regan Smith, and Marcos Ambrose. Kenseth was seventh, still within two-tenths of a second of Martin's time. In the second and final practice session, Trevor Bayne was quickest with a time of 29.246 seconds. Biffle followed in the second position, ahead of Kenseth, Bowyer, and Allmendinger. Harvick was sixth after posting a time of 29.355 seconds, while Hamlin and Kurt Busch followed in seventh and eighth. Truex Jr. and Joey Logano rounded out the first ten positions.

Forty-six cars were entered for qualifying, but only forty-three raced because of NASCAR's qualifying procedure. Truex Jr. clinched his seventh pole position during his career, with a time of 28.366 seconds. He was joined on the front row of the grid by Kenseth. Biffle qualified third, Martin took fourth, and Kasey Kahne started fifth. Newman, Ambrose, Keselowski, Jamie McMurray, and Johnson rounded out the first ten positions. The drivers who failed to qualify for the race were David Stremme, Joe Nemechek and Stacy Compton. Once the qualifying session concluded, Truex Jr. said, "That's our main goal. This team's good enough. We can get to Victory Lane. We're going to do it soon. I feel good about this team. I'm just having so much fun coming to the race track and driving these cars. We're going to make them proud here pretty quick."

== Notes ==
- The last 234 laps went green, setting a NASCAR record for the longest consecutive green flag run on an intermediate track.

Previous race: 2012 Goody's Fast Relief 500	Sprint Cup Series; 2012 season	Next race: 2012 STP 400
