= Charles Lewandoski =

American stock car racing driver

- Born: May 18, 1985 (age 41); Stafford Springs, Connecticut, U.S.

NASCAR O'Reilly Auto Parts Series career
- 29 races run over 5 years
- 2015 position: 69th
- Best finish: 30th (2011)
- First race: 2008 Camping World RV Sales 200 (Loudon)
- Last race: 2015 3M 250 (Iowa)
Wins	Top tens	Poles
0	0	0

NASCAR FedEx Freight Truck Series career
- 8 races run over 2 years
- Best finish: 44th (2014)
- First race: 2009 Heluva Good! 200 (Loudon)
- Last race: 2014 Rhino Linings 350 (Las Vegas)
Wins	Top tens	Poles
0	0	0
- Statistics up to date as of May 17, 2015.

Charles Lewandoski (born May 18, 1985) is an American former professional stock car racing driver.

== Early career ==
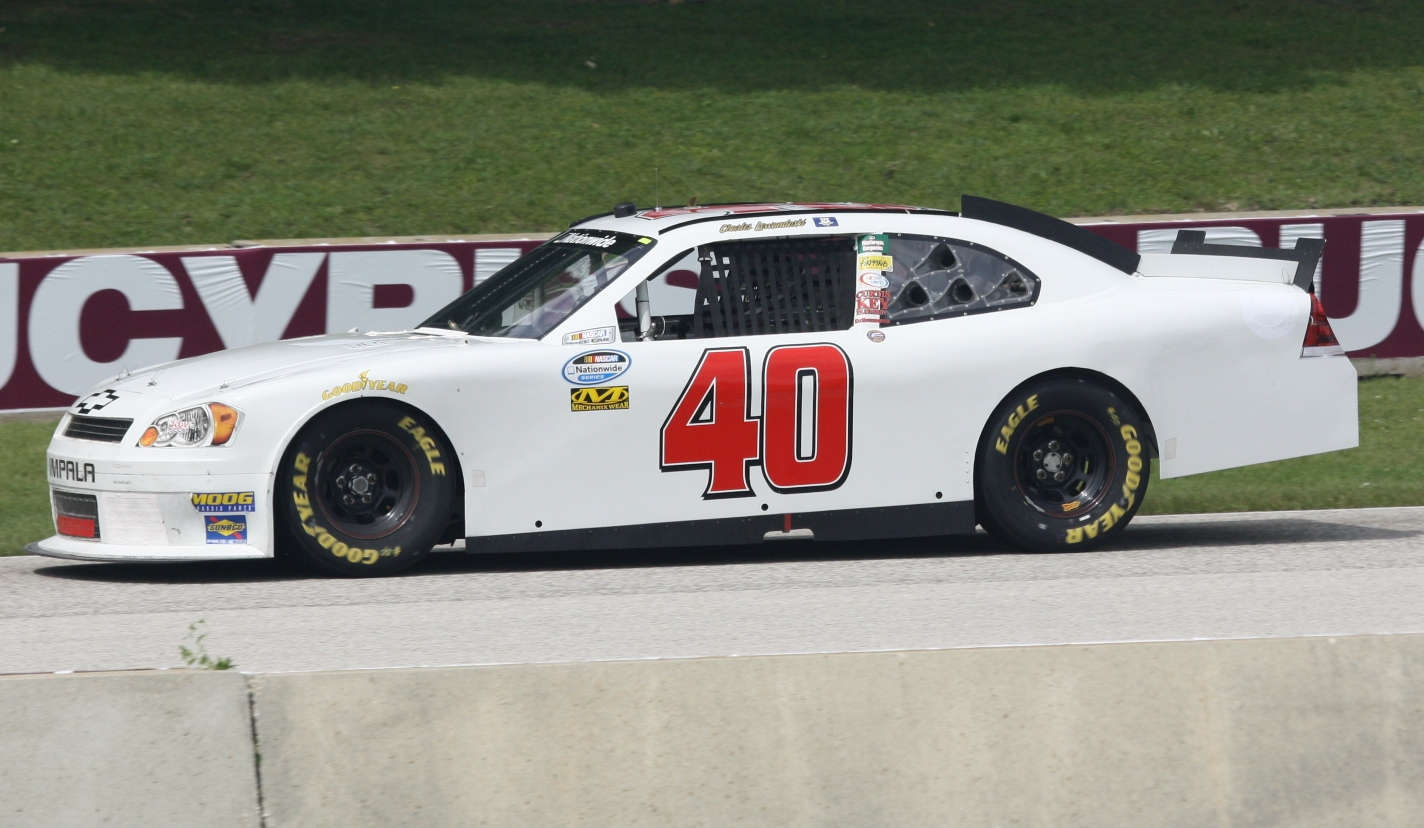
Lewandoski racing for Key Motorsports in 2011

At the age of 16, Lewandoski was able to move into the NASCAR Late Model division at his home track, Stafford Motor Speedway. On August 9, 2002, he became the youngest-ever winner in the track's history.

At the age of 18, Lewandoski made several starts in the NASCAR Busch North Series, now known as the NASCAR K&N Pro Series East. He competed in the series in a limited basis that year and again in 2005, with a full campaign in 2006. That year, he earned the series' Most Improved Driver Award.

== NASCAR career ==
Lewandoski made his NASCAR Nationwide Series debut for Fitz Motorsports in 2008 at New Hampshire Motor Speedway. His NASCAR Camping World Truck Series debut came at New Hampshire in 2009.

In 2011, Lewandoski ran a limited schedule for TriStar Motorsports, Go Green Racing, and Key Motorsports. He has not run an Xfinity Series race since 2015.

== Motorsports career results ==
=== NASCAR ===
(key) (Bold – Pole position awarded by qualifying time. Italics – Pole position earned by points standings or practice time. * – Most laps led.)

==== Xfinity Series ====
NASCAR Xfinity Series results
Year	Team	No.	Make	1	2	3	4	5	6	7	8	9	10	11	12	13	14	15	16	17	18	19	20	21	22	23	24	25	26	27	28	29	30	31	32	33	34	35	NXSC	Pts	Ref
2008	Jay Robinson Racing	36	Dodge	DAY	CAL	LVS	ATL	BRI	NSH	TEX	PHO	MXC	TAL	RCH	DAR	CLT	DOV	NSH	KEN	MLW	NHA; 41	DAY	CHI	GTY	IRP; DNQ	CGV	GLN	MCH	BRI	CAL	RCH	DOV	KAN	CLT	MEM	TEX	PHO	HOM	146th	40	
2010	Go Green Racing	39	Ford	DAY	CAL	LVS	BRI	NSH	PHO	TEX	TAL	RCH	DAR	DOV	CLT	NSH	KEN	ROA	NHA; 31	DAY	CHI	GTY	IRP	IOW	GLN	MCH	BRI	CGV	ATL	RCH	DOV	KAN	CAL	CLT	GTY	TEX			109th	113	
2010	TriStar Motorsports	34	Chevy																																		PHO; 40	HOM	109th	113	
2011	TriStar Motorsports	44	Chevy	DAY	PHO; 21																																		30th	194	
2011	R3 Motorsports	03	Dodge			LVS; 40	BRI																																30th	194	
2011	Go Green Racing	39	Ford					CAL; 25	TEX	TAL	NSH	RCH; 31	DAR																										30th	194	
2011	Go Green Racing	04	Ford											DOV; 42																									30th	194	
2011	Key Motorsports	40	Chevy												IOW; 41	CLT; DNQ	CHI; 24	MCH; 30	ROA; 37	DAY; 40	KEN; 28	NHA; 22			IOW; 22	GLN	CGV	BRI	ATL	RCH	CHI			CLT; 33	TEX	PHO	HOM		30th	194	
2011	Key Motorsports	47	Chevy																				NSH; 41	IRP; 40								DOV; 38	KAN; 40						30th	194	
2012	ML Motorsports	70	Chevy	DAY	PHO; 34	LVS	BRI	CAL	TEX	RCH	TAL	DAR																											81st	19	
2012	TriStar Motorsports	44	Toyota										IOW; QL^{†}	CLT	DOV	MCH	ROA	KEN	DAY																				81st	19	
2012	Rick Ware Racing	15	Chevy																	NHA; 39	CHI	IND	IOW	GLN	CGV	BRI	ATL	RCH	CHI										81st	19	
2012	TriStar Motorsports	10	Toyota																											KEN; 43	DOV; 43	CLT; 42	KAN	TEX	PHO	HOM			81st	19	
2015	Team Kapusta Racing	56	Chevy	DAY	ATL	LVS	PHO; 30	CAL	TEX	BRI	RCH																												69th	23	
2015	TriStar Motorsports	10	Toyota									TAL; 40																											69th	23	
2015	TriStar Motorsports	19	Toyota										IOW; 39	CLT	DOV	MCH	CHI	DAY	KEN	NHA	IND	IOW	GLN	MOH	BRI	ROA	DAR	RCH	CHI	KEN	DOV	CLT	KAN	TEX	PHO	HOM			69th	23	
^{†} - Qualified for Mike Bliss .

==== Camping World Truck Series ====
NASCAR Camping World Truck Series results
Year	Team	No.	Make	1	2	3	4	5	6	7	8	9	10	11	12	13	14	15	16	17	18	19	20	21	22	23	24	25	NCWTC	Pts	Ref
2009	Corrie Stott Racing	01	Dodge	DAY	CAL	ATL	MAR	KAN	CLT	DOV	TEX	MCH	MLW	MEM	KEN	IRP	NSH	BRI	CHI	IOW	GTW	NHA; 32	LVS	MAR	TAL	TEX	PHO	HOM	116th	0	
2014	Young's Motorsports	60	Chevy	DAY; Wth	MAR																								44th	78	
2014	Young's Motorsports	42	Chevy			KAN; 29	CLT; 33	DOV; 32	TEX	GTW; 30	KEN; 31	IOW; 34	ELD	POC	MCH	BRI	MSP	CHI	NHA										44th	78	
2014	Win-Tron Racing	35	Toyota																	LVS; 30	TAL	MAR	TEX	PHO	HOM				44th	78	

==== Camping World East Series ====
NASCAR Camping World East Series results
Year	Team	No.	Make	1	2	3	4	5	6	7	8	9	10	11	12	13	NCWESC	Pts	Ref
2004	Lewandoski Racing	01	Chevy	LEE	TMP; 16	LRP	SEE	STA; 18	HOL	ERI	WFD; 12	NHA	ADI	GLN	NHA	DOV	32nd	151	
2005	Lewandoski Racing	01	Chevy	STA; 22	HOL; 13	ERI; 24	NHA; 31	WFD; 26	ADI; 24	STA; 12	DUB; 20	OXF	NHA	DOV	LRP	TMP; 11	21st	918	
2006	Lewandoski Racing	01	Chevy	GRE; 9	STA; 6	HOL; 7	TMP; 3	ERI; 20	NHA; 19	ADI; 25	WFD; 8	NHA; 19	DOV; 30	LRP; 23			10th	1319	
2008	Lewandoski Racing	01	Toyota	GRE	IOW	SBO	GLN	NHA; 18	TMP	NSH	ADI	LRP	MFD	NHA	DOV	STA; 27	48th	191	
