= TriStar Motorsports =

Stock car racing team

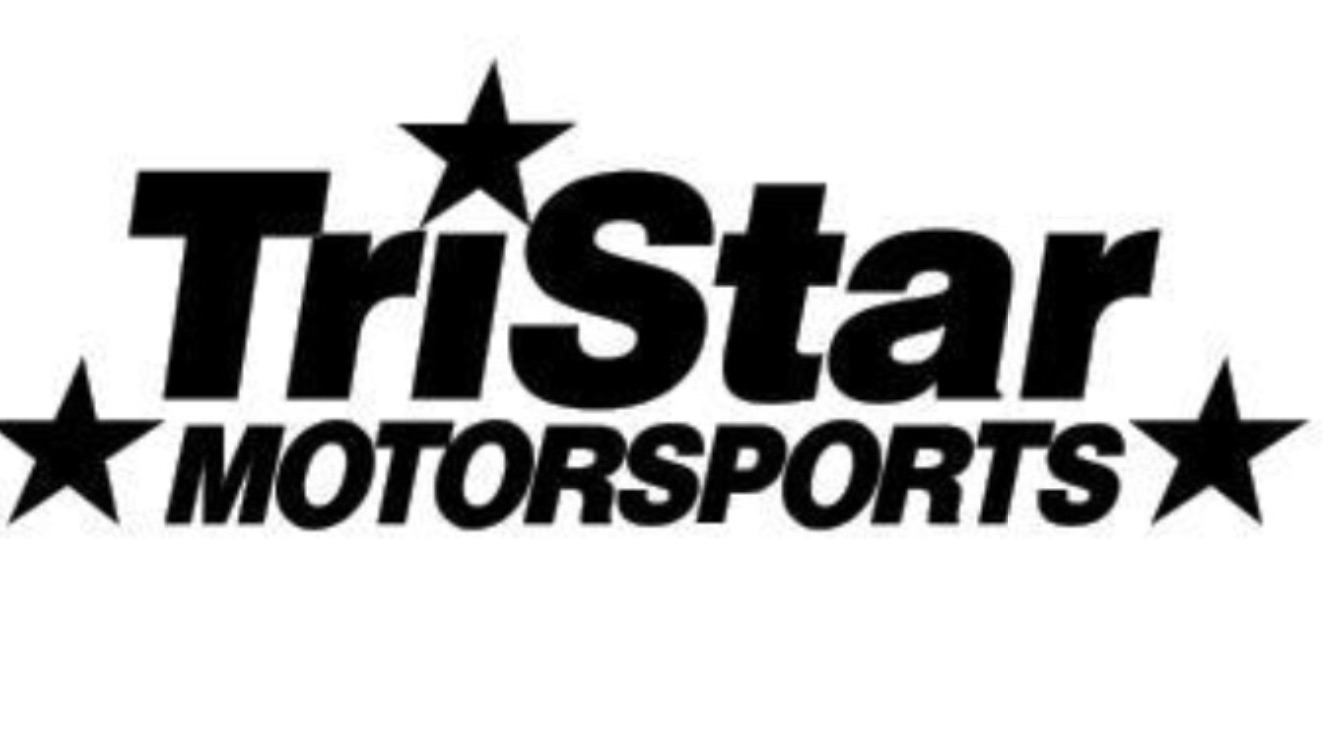
- Owner: Bryan Smith
- Base: Mooresville, North Carolina
- Series: NASCAR Cup Series
- Manufacturer: Chevrolet, Ford
- Opened: 1989
- Closed: 2019

Career
- Debut: NASCAR Cup Series: 1989 Winston 500 (Talladega); Xfinity Series: 2010 DRIVE4COPD 300 (Daytona)
- Latest race: NASCAR Cup Series: 2018 Ford EcoBoost 400 (Homestead); Xfinity Series: 2017 Ford EcoBoost 300 (Homestead)
- Races competed: Total: 884; NASCAR Cup Series: 197; Xfinity Series: 687
- Drivers' Championships: Total: 0 NASCAR Cup Series: 0 Xfinity Series: 0
- Race victories: Total: 0 NASCAR Cup Series: 0 Xfinity Series: 0
- Pole positions: Total: 3 NASCAR Cup Series: 3 Xfinity Series: 0

TriStar Motorsports was an American professional stock car racing team that used to compete in the Monster Energy NASCAR Cup Series. The team competed in the NASCAR Winston Cup Series primarily during the early to mid 1990s, suspending racing operations in 1997 and continuing on as Tri-Star Motors, and later Pro Motor Engines, supplying engines to many NASCAR teams prior to returning to competition in 2010.

Founded by Mark Smith. On July 22, 2017, Mark Smith died of cancer. His son Bryan took over ownership of TriStar Motorsports.

== Cup Series ==
=== Winston Cup 1989–2000 ===
TriStar made its debut in 1989 at Talladega Superspeedway. Driver Ron Esau finished 38th after wrecking the No. 18 Pontiac. Brad Teague made the team's second start at Charlotte Motor Speedway with Mello Yello but finished 31st after suffering engine failure. Barn Animals sponsored Hut Stricklin's No. 68 entry at the 1990 Daytona 500, and fielded the No. 18 for him at Atlanta Motor Speedway, where he finished 33rd and 37th, respectively. TriStar switched back to the No. 68 at Talladega Superspeedway, with sponsorship from, Interstate Batteries, where Stanley Smith would finish 37th after an early wreck. The team finished their first race at Michigan with Mike Chase finishing 24th. They ran the No. 68 with Country Time Lemonade sponsorship and Bobby Hamilton driving in two races, with a best finish of 28th.

In 1991, TriStar ran full-time with Hamilton and Country Time again sponsoring their Oldsmobile. Hamilton had four top-ten finishes and finished 22nd in points, winning Rookie of the Year honors. They began 1992 with no top-ten finishes, and later switched to Ford Thunderbirds, allowing Hamilton to get two top-ten finishes and finish 25th in points. After failing to finish higher than 15th eight races into the 1993 season, Hamilton was released. Greg Sacks drove for the rest of the season, with Dorsey Schroeder filling in at the road course races, and Loy Allen driving at Phoenix International Raceway.

Allen was named the full-time driver for the 1994 season, in addition to TriStar switching to the No. 19 and getting Hooters sponsorship. Allen won the pole for the Daytona 500, becoming the first rookie driver to do so. He also qualified on the pole at Atlanta and Michigan, but failed to qualify for twelve races that season and finished 39th in points. Allen and Hooters left Tri-Star at the end of the year, and Phil Parsons took over the driving duties for the first five races of the 1995 season with Ultra Custom Wheels sponsorship. After the first five races, the team cut back and did not run any races until the Winston Select 500, when Allen returned to the team with Healthsource sponsoring the car. In their first race back together, Allen and TriStar qualified second and finished tenth, Allen's career-best finish. TriStar ran a limited schedule for the rest of 1995, with Ron Fellows driving the No. 68 at Watkins Glen, and Allen driving the No. 19 during the rest of the season.

Healthsource signed for a full season of sponsorship in 1996, but Allen suffered a severe neck injury at the second race of the season at North Carolina Speedway, causing him to miss the next ten races. Dick Trickle filled in the interim, placing eighth at the Food City 500. Upon Allen's return, Tri-Star again moved to a part-time schedule, getting a best finish of 21st. Healthsource left the team at the end of the season, and Child Support Recovery took its place. After two races into the 1997 season, Allen was released and Gary Bradberry replaced him. After failing to qualify for the Miller 400, Child Support Recovery was dropped by the team due to lack of funding and racing operations were suspended again.

In 1999, they leased their shop to SBIII Motorsports and built engines for them. Following the team's closure near the end of the season, TriStar reacquired its equipment and fielded the No. 48 FansTeam Ford for Stanton Barrett at the 2000 Daytona 500, but did not qualify.

==== Car No. 19/68 results ====
NASCAR Winston Cup Series results
Year	Team	No.	Make	1	2	3	4	5	6	7	8	9	10	11	12	13	14	15	16	17	18	19	20	21	22	23	24	25	26	27	28	29	30	31	32	33	34	NWCC	Pts
1989	Ron Esau	18	Pontiac	DAY	CAR	ATL	RCH	DAR	BRI	NWS	MAR	TAL; 38	CLT	DOV	SON	POC	MCH	DAY	POC	TAL	GLN	MCH	BRI	DAR	RCH	DOV	MAR											N/A	-
1989	Brad Teague	18	Pontiac																									CLT; 31	NWS	CAR	PHO	ATL						N/A	-
1990	Hut Stricklin	68	Chevy	DAY; 33	RCH	CAR																																N/A	-
1990	Hut Stricklin	18	Pontiac				ATL; 37	DAR	BRI	NWS	MAR	TAL	CLT	DOV	SON	POC	MCH	DAY	POC																			N/A	-
1990	Stanley Smith	68	Pontiac																	TAL; 37	GLN																	N/A	-
1990	Mike Chase	68	Pontiac																			MCH; 24	BRI	DAR	RCH	DOV	MAR	NWS										N/A	-
1990	Bobby Hamilton	68	Pontiac																										CLT; 28	CAR	PHO	ATL; 40						N/A	-
1991	Bobby Hamilton	68	Olds	DAY; 10	RCH; 28	CAR; 21	ATL; 33	DAR; 20	BRI; 31		MAR; DNQ	TAL; 12	CLT; 27	DOV; 11	SON; 22	POC; 35	MCH; 22	DAY; 28	POC; 11	TAL; 34	GLN; 29	MCH; 19	BRI; 13	DAR; 10	RCH; 12	DOV; 8	MAR; 17	NWS; 18	CLT; 29	CAR; 6	PHO; 13	ATL; 18						23rd	2915
1991	Bobby Hamilton	68	Pontiac							NWS; 21																												23rd	2915
1992	Bobby Hamilton	68	Olds	DAY; 32	CAR; 18	RCH; 31	ATL; 24	DAR; 23	BRI; 26	NWS; 27	MAR; 13	TAL; 20	CLT; 21	DOV; 18	SON; 34	POC; 17	MCH; 31		POC; 22		GLN; 22		BRI; 21															27th	2787
1992	Bobby Hamilton	68	Chevy															DAY; 33		TAL; 24																		27th	2787
1992	Bobby Hamilton	68	Ford																			MCH; 15		DAR; 21	RCH; 32	DOV; 10	MAR; 28	NWS; 31	CLT; 15	CAR; 19	PHO; 8	ATL; 12						27th	2787
1993	Bobby Hamilton	68	Ford	DAY; 27	CAR; 15	RCH; 22	ATL; 26	DAR; 23	BRI; 35	NWS; 29	MAR; 33																											26th	2830
1993	Greg Sacks	68	Ford									TAL; 33		CLT; 17	DOV; 38	POC; 18	MCH; 22	DAY; 15	NHA; 32	POC; 32	TAL; 6		MCH; 12	BRI; 19	DAR; 25	RCH; 31	DOV; 20	MAR; 28	NWS; DNQ	CLT; 32	CAR; 32		ATL; 24					26th	2830
1993	Dorsey Schroeder	68	Ford										SON; 33									GLN; 38																26th	2830
1993	Loy Allen Jr.	68	Ford																													PHO; 26						26th	2830
1994	Loy Allen Jr.	19	Ford	DAY; 22	CAR; 40	RCH; DNQ	ATL; 22	DAR; DNQ	BRI; DNQ	NWS; DNQ	MAR; DNQ	TAL; 40	SON; DNQ	CLT; 11	DOV; 15	POC; 31	MCH; 24	DAY; 40	NHA; DNQ	POC; 18	TAL; 37	IND; DNQ	GLN; DNQ	MCH; 22	BRI; DNQ	DAR; 21	RCH; 31	DOV; 22	MAR; DNQ	NWS; DNQ	CLT; 27	CAR; 42	PHO; 41	ATL; 42				39th	1468
1995	Phil Parsons	19	Ford	DAY; 41	CAR; DNQ	RCH	ATL; 42	DAR; DNQ	BRI	NWS	MAR																											43rd	591
1995	Loy Allen Jr.	19	Ford									TAL; 10	SON	CLT; 36	DOV; DNQ	POC	MCH	DAY; 31	NHA	POC	TAL; 39	IND; DNQ	GLN	MCH; DNQ	BRI	DAR; 34	RCH	DOV	MAR	NWS	CLT; 27	CAR; DNQ	PHO	ATL; 24				43rd	591
1996	Loy Allen Jr.	19	Ford	DAY; 36	CAR; 36											POC; 23	MCH; 28	DAY; 30	NHA; DNQ	POC	TAL; 28	IND	GLN			DAR; 41	RCH	DOV	MAR	NWS	CLT; 34	CAR	PHO	ATL; 39				40th	1461
1996	Dick Trickle	19	Ford			RCH; DNQ	ATL; 14	DAR; 35	BRI; 8	NWS; 22	MAR; DNQ	TAL; 19	SON; 29	CLT; 20	DOV; 28																							40th	1461
1996	Mike Wallace	19	Ford																					MCH; 29	BRI													40th	1461
1997	Loy Allen Jr.	19	Ford	DAY; 26	CAR; 43																																	47th	641
1997	Gary Bradberry	19	Ford			RCH; 38	ATL; 40	DAR; 38	TEX; DNQ	BRI; 37	MAR; DNQ	SON; 43	TAL; DNQ	CLT; 31	DOV; 35	POC; 33	MCH; DNQ	CAL	DAY	NHA	POC	IND	GLN	MCH	BRI	DAR	RCH	NHA	DOV	MAR	CLT	TAL	CAR	PHO	ATL			47th	641
2000	Stanton Barrett	48	Ford	DAY; DNQ	CAR	LVS	ATL	DAR	BRI	TEX	MAR	TAL	CAL	RCH	CLT	DOV	MCH	POC	SON	DAY	NHA	POC	IND	GLN	MCH	BRI	DAR	RCH	NHA	DOV	MAR	CLT	TAL	CAR	PHO	HOM	ATL	NA	-

=== Car No. 35 history ===
TriStar attempted to qualify for the race at Watkins Glen in 2010 with driver Tony Ave in the No. 35 Chevrolet Impala purchased from Front Row Motorsports, however, after showing signs of mechanical issues during qualifying, which included smoke and fluid trailing from behind the car, the team did not qualify. It was the only Cup race Tri-Star attempted that year.

==== Car No. 35 results ====
NASCAR Sprint Cup Series results
Year	Team	No.	Make	1	2	3	4	5	6	7	8	9	10	11	12	13	14	15	16	17	18	19	20	21	22	23	24	25	26	27	28	29	30	31	32	33	34	35	36	NSCC	Pts
2010	Tony Ave	35	Chevy	DAY	CAL	LVS	ATL	BRI	MAR	PHO	TEX	TAL	RCH	DAR	DOV	CLT	POC	MCH	SON	NHA	DAY	CHI	IND	POC	GLN; DNQ	MCH	BRI	ATL	RCH	NHA	DOV	KAN	CAL	CLT	MAR	TAL	TEX	PHO	HOM	N/A	-

=== Car No. 19/91 history ===
Mark Smith returned to the Cup Series in 2012 by partnering with former HP Racing co-owner Randy Humphrey. As Humphrey Smith Racing, the team fielded Jason Leffler, Chris Cook, Jeff Green, and Mike Bliss in the No. 19 Toyota Camry. The team started fielding the No. 91 for Reed Sorenson and Jason Leffler starting at Indianapolis Motor Speedway as well. The team ran a mix of Ford, Toyota, and Chevrolet recycled from other teams for the No. 91 team, both cars are Start and parks. The No. 19 team and Bliss had returned for the 2013 season, running a Toyota. They attempted the full Daytona 500 with G-Oil as the sponsor, but failed to make the race. The car was driven by Jason Leffler in the Party in the Poconos 400, three days before he was killed in a sprint car accident at Bridgeport Speedway in New Jersey. Following his death, the team, like others in the racing community, ran "LEFTURN" logos above the driver doors in honor of Leffler.

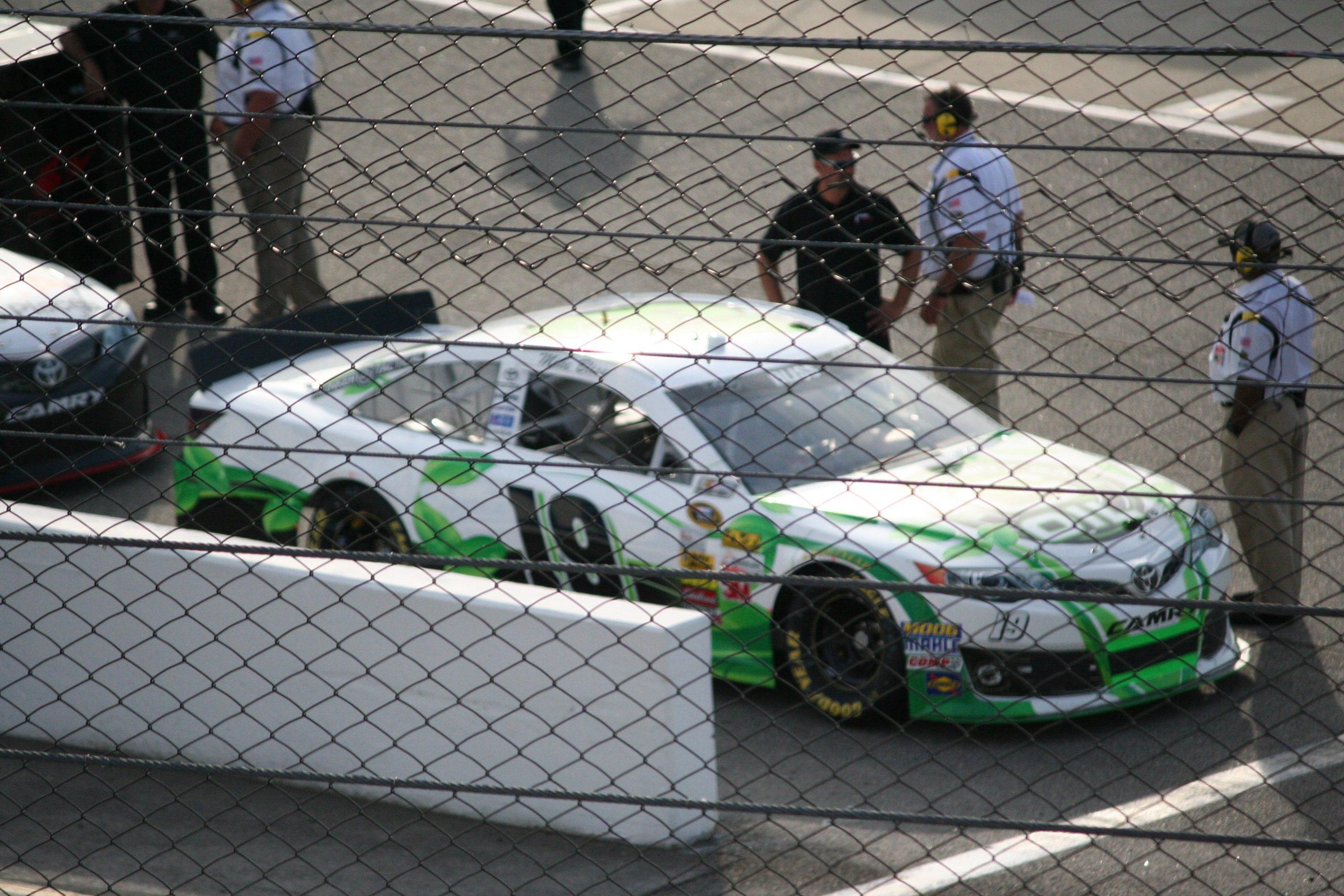
Mike Bliss at Richmond in 2013

The team also employed Alex Kennedy for the road courses. Kennedy crashed at Sonoma, parked at Pocono, but finished 29th at Watkins Glen. Scott Riggs attempted Michigan with them but didn’t qualify. Smith shut the team down before the Chase.

In 2014, Humphrey left TriStar and started his own Cup operation, the No. 77 Ford Fusion driven by Dave Blaney. Smith did not field an entry in the Sprint Cup Series in 2014, and the No. 19 was claimed by Joe Gibbs Racing for its new entry in 2015 for Carl Edwards.

==== Car No. 19 results ====
NASCAR Sprint Cup Series results
Year	Team	No.	Make	1	2	3	4	5	6	7	8	9	10	11	12	13	14	15	16	17	18	19	20	21	22	23	24	25	26	27	28	29	30	31	32	33	34	35	36	NSCC	Pts
2012	Mike Bliss	19	Toyota	DAY	PHO	LVS	BRI	CAL; 40	MAR; DNQ	TEX; 40	KAN; 42	RCH; 42	TAL	DAR; DNQ	CLT; DNQ	DOV; 36	POC; 38	MCH; 39		KEN; 42	DAY	NHA; DNQ	IND; 43	POC; 39			BRI; 43	ATL; DNQ	RCH; 40	CHI; 42		DOV; DNQ	TAL	CLT; 39	KAN; 36	MAR; DNQ	TEX; 41	PHO; 41	HOM; 43	45th	72
2012	Chris Cook	19	Toyota																SON; 42						GLN; 41															45th	72
2012	Jason Leffler	19	Ford																							MCH; 43														45th	72
2012	Jeff Green	19	Toyota																												NHA; DNQ									45th	72
2013	Mike Bliss	19	Toyota	DAY; DNQ	PHO; 42	LVS; DNQ	BRI; 43	CAL; 43	MAR; DNQ	TEX; 41	KAN; 41	RCH; 43	TAL; Wth	DAR; 43	CLT; DNQ	DOV; 41		MCH; 41		KEN; 41	DAY	NHA; 43	IND; DNQ				BRI; DNQ	ATL	RCH; DNQ	CHI; Wth	NHA	DOV	KAN	CLT	TAL	MAR	TEX	PHO	HOM	45th	44
2013	Jason Leffler	19	Toyota														POC; 43																							45th	44
2013	Alex Kennedy	19	Toyota																SON; 40					POC; 42	GLN; 29															45th	44
2013	Scott Riggs	19	Toyota																							MCH; DNQ														45th	44

==== Car No. 91 results ====
NASCAR Sprint Cup Series results
Year	Team	No.	Make	1	2	3	4	5	6	7	8	9	10	11	12	13	14	15	16	17	18	19	20	21	22	23	24	25	26	27	28	29	30	31	32	33	34	35	36	NSCC	Pts
2012	Reed Sorenson	91	Ford	DAY	PHO	LVS	BRI	CAL	MAR	TEX	KAN	RCH	TAL	DAR	CLT	DOV	POC	MCH	SON	KEN	DAY	NHA	IND; DNQ																	51st	20
2012	Reed Sorenson	91	Toyota																					POC; 42	GLN	MCH; 42		ATL; 42				DOV; 43	TAL	CLT; 41	KAN; 41		TEX; 43			51st	20
2012	Reed Sorenson	91	Chevy																								BRI; DNQ		RCH; 43	CHI; DNQ	NHA; 42					MAR; 43				51st	20
2012	Jason Leffler	91	Chevy																																			PHO; 43		51st	20
2012	Jason Leffler	91	Toyota																																				HOM; DNQ	51st	20

=== Car No. 72 history ===
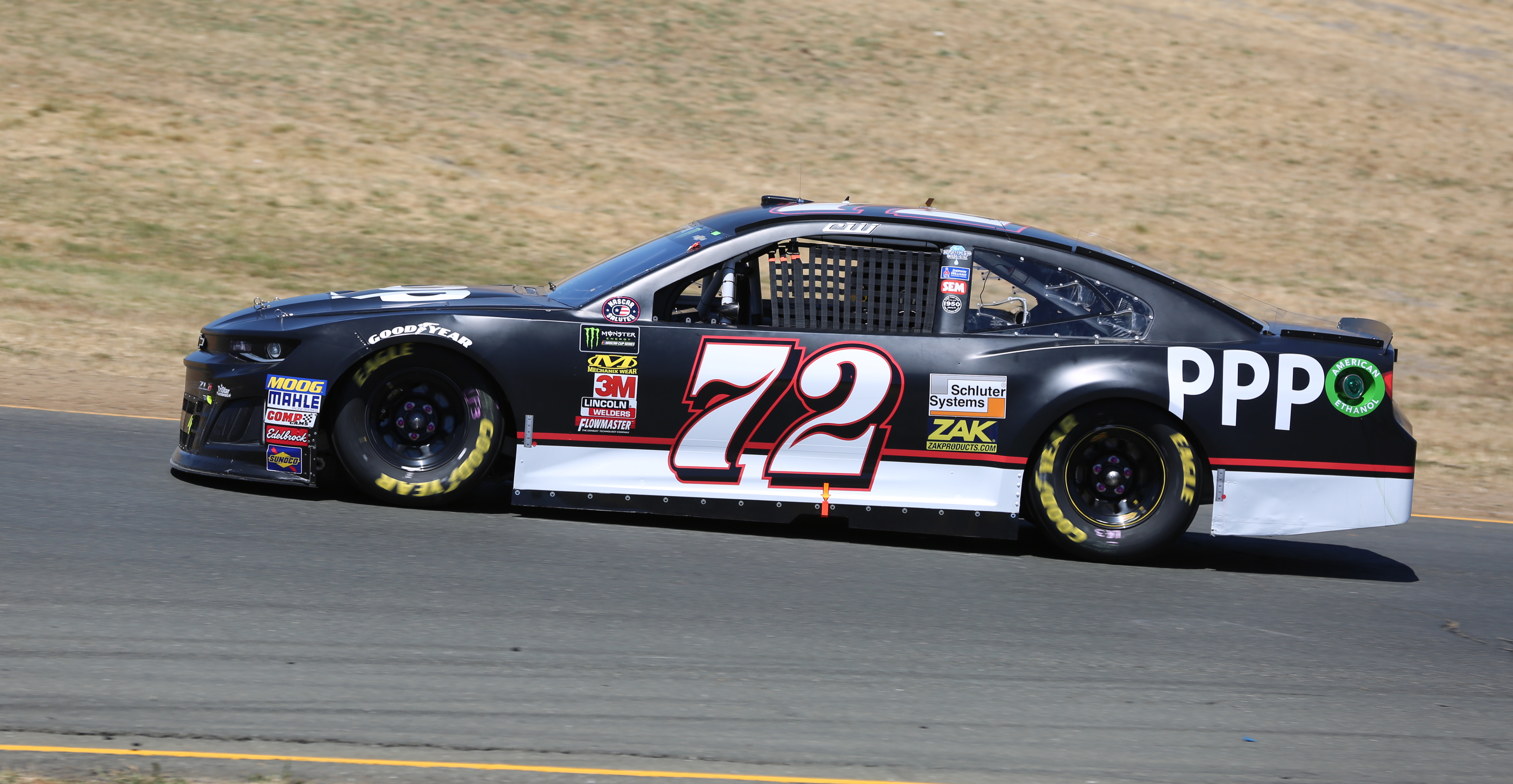
Cole Whitt driving the No. 72 at Sonoma Raceway in 2018

In 2017, TriStar announced that they would field one full-time team, the No. 72 Chevrolet SS for Whitt. The team took lease of the No. 35 charter from Front Row Motorsports to secure a spot every race. Whitt ended up finishing the 2017 season with a best of 12th, and brought the car home 33rd in driver & owner standings.

For 2018, TriStar again took lease of a charter from Front Row Motorsports. Whitt requested a limited schedule of only ten races in order to focus on family. Corey LaJoie drove the No. 72 in the 26 races in which Whitt did not run in 2018, finishing 34th in driver standings with a best finish of 16th. Whitt later retired from stock car competition and LaJoie departed for the No. 32 team, leaving TriStar without a driver for 2019. The team was unable to acquire a charter for 2019 and has not attempted a race since Homestead-Miami.

In a September 2019 interview, former TriStar crew chief Frank Kerr confirmed the team has since shut down. The charter leased to the team was returned to Front Row, and sold to Rick Ware Racing for the No. 52 team, while certain equipment and a hauler were liquidated to Tommy Joe Martins' team.

==== Car No. 72 results ====
Monster Energy NASCAR Cup Series results
Year	Team	No.	Make	1	2	3	4	5	6	7	8	9	10	11	12	13	14	15	16	17	18	19	20	21	22	23	24	25	26	27	28	29	30	31	32	33	34	35	36	MENCC	Pts	Ref
2017	Cole Whitt	72	Ford	DAY; 18																																				33rd	322	
2017	Cole Whitt	72	Chevy		ATL; 20	LVS; 28	PHO; 34	CAL; 32	MAR; 21	TEX; 30	BRI; 21	RCH; 27	TAL; 16	KAN; 26	CLT; 34	DOV; 22	POC; 30	MCH; 31	SON; 21	DAY; 39	KEN; 34	NHA; 38	IND; 12	POC; 24	GLN; 34	MCH; 29	BRI; 33	DAR; 23	RCH; 33	CHI; 35	NHA; 30	DOV; 32	CLT; 34	TAL; 34	KAN; 24	MAR; 25	TEX; 29	PHO; 36	HOM; 28	33rd	322	
2018	Cole Whitt	72	Chevy		ATL; 28	LVS; 28		CAL; 28	MAR; 27	TEX; 19		RCH; 30	TAL; 21				POC; 30		SON; 35						GLN; 34							CLT; 20				MAR; 24		PHO; 25		33rd	276	
2018	Corey LaJoie	72	Chevy	DAY; 40			PHO; 37				BRI; 25			DOV; 38	KAN; 24	CLT; 26		MCH; 27		CHI; 34	DAY; 31	KEN; 31	NHA; 27	POC; 39		MCH; 40	BRI; 34	DAR; 27	IND; 27	LVS; 16	RCH; 32		DOV; 30	TAL; 32	KAN; 34		TEX; 40		HOM; 34	33rd	276	

== Xfinity Series ==
After a nine-year hiatus from fielding race teams, TriStar acquired the Nationwide team owned by Front Row Motorsports, and fielded three cars in 2010, the former FRM team No. 34 Chevrolet Impala for Tony Raines, a new team, the No. 35 Chevrolet Impala for Jason Keller and ran the No. 36 Chevrolet Impala on a part-time schedule. The team used their own PME Motors.

=== Car No. 8 history ===
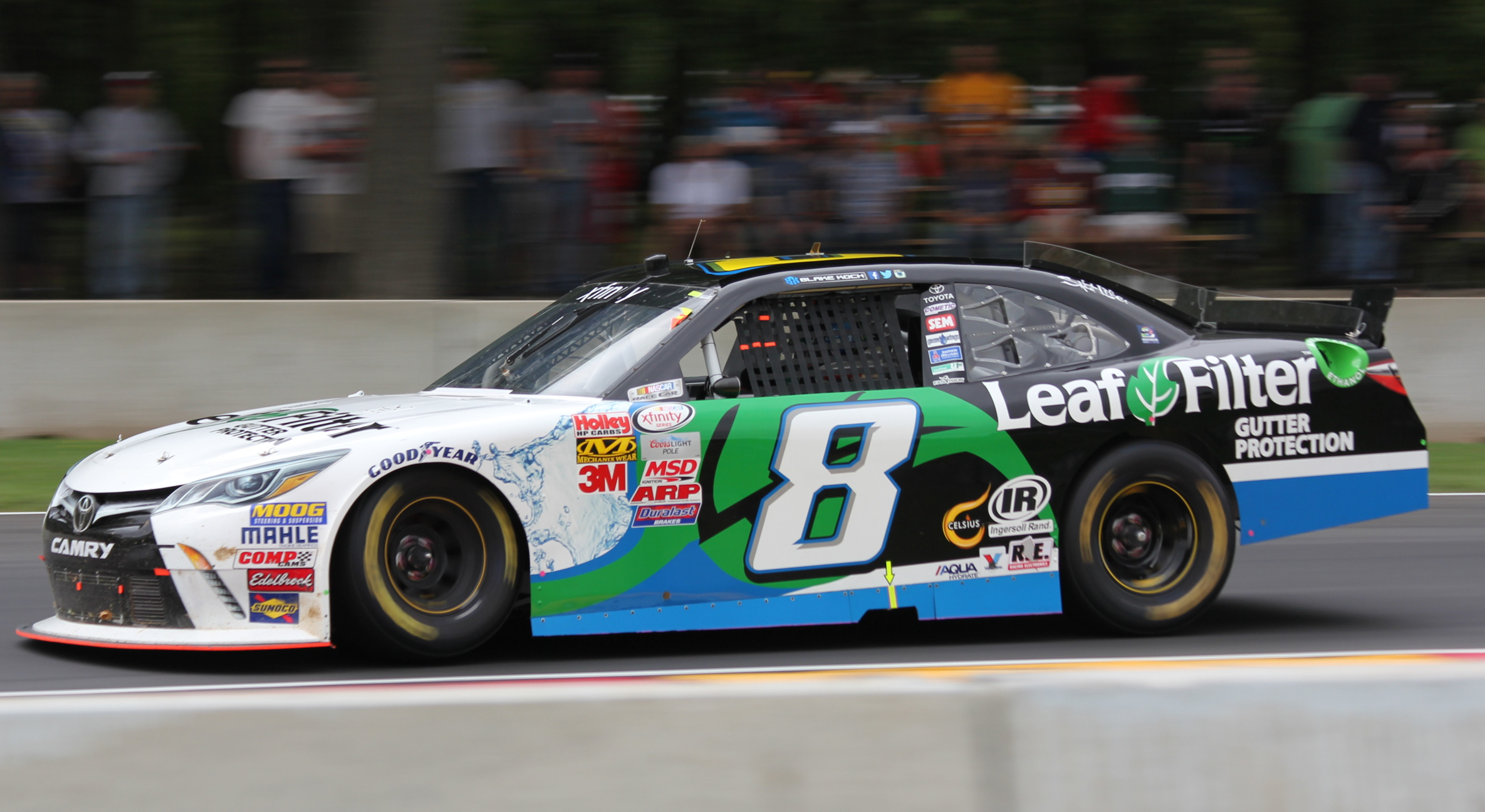
Blake Koch at Road America in 2015.

In January 2015 the team announced that Blake Koch would run the full season, in a new No. 8 car with crew chief Bruce Cook. LeafFilter Gutter Protection was the primary sponsor. Koch opened the season with a 20th-place finish at Daytona. After announcing in June that he would return to TriStar for 2016, he and LeafFilter would move to Kaulig Racing for 2016, taking the No. 8 team's owner points, for the 2016 season, leaving the No. 8 team to be shut down.

==== Car No. 8 Results ====
NASCAR Xfinity Series results
Year	Driver	No.	Make	1	2	3	4	5	6	7	8	9	10	11	12	13	14	15	16	17	18	19	20	21	22	23	24	25	26	27	28	29	30	31	32	33	Owners	Pts
2015	Blake Koch	8	Toyota	DAY; 20	ATL; 22	LVS; 35	PHO; 25	CAL; 19	TEX; 32	BRI; 22	RCH; 24	TAL; 23	IOW; 22	CLT; 23	DOV; 30	MCH; 36	CHI; 22	DAY; 18	KEN; 22	NHA; 20	IND; 37	IOW; 24	GLN; 18	MOH; 24	BRI; 21	ROA; 21	DAR; 27	RCH; 19	CHI; 21	KEN; 40	DOV; 23	CLT; 33	KAN; 25	TEX; 21	PHO; 20	HOM; 18	24th	646

=== Car No. 10 history ===
The No. 10 began as the No. 36, which was a third car in 2010 with Tony Ave and Jeff Green behind the wheel, running as a start and park operation. The team used the prize money used to fund the No. 34 and No. 35 teams. For 2012 the team returned and changed number to 10, and Green drove the car as a start and park. However, when Green moved to the No. 14 Toyota Camry after Eric McClure's injury, Tony Raines and Kevin Lepage became the temporary drivers until McClure returned at Road America.

Green ran the majority of the races in 2013 as a start and park again. Cole Whitt moved over from the No. 44 Toyota Camry and ran the full race at Bristol in August, finishing tenth with Gold Bond as the sponsor. Mike Bliss ran the car at Homestead with his usual No. 19 occupied by Dakoda Armstrong.

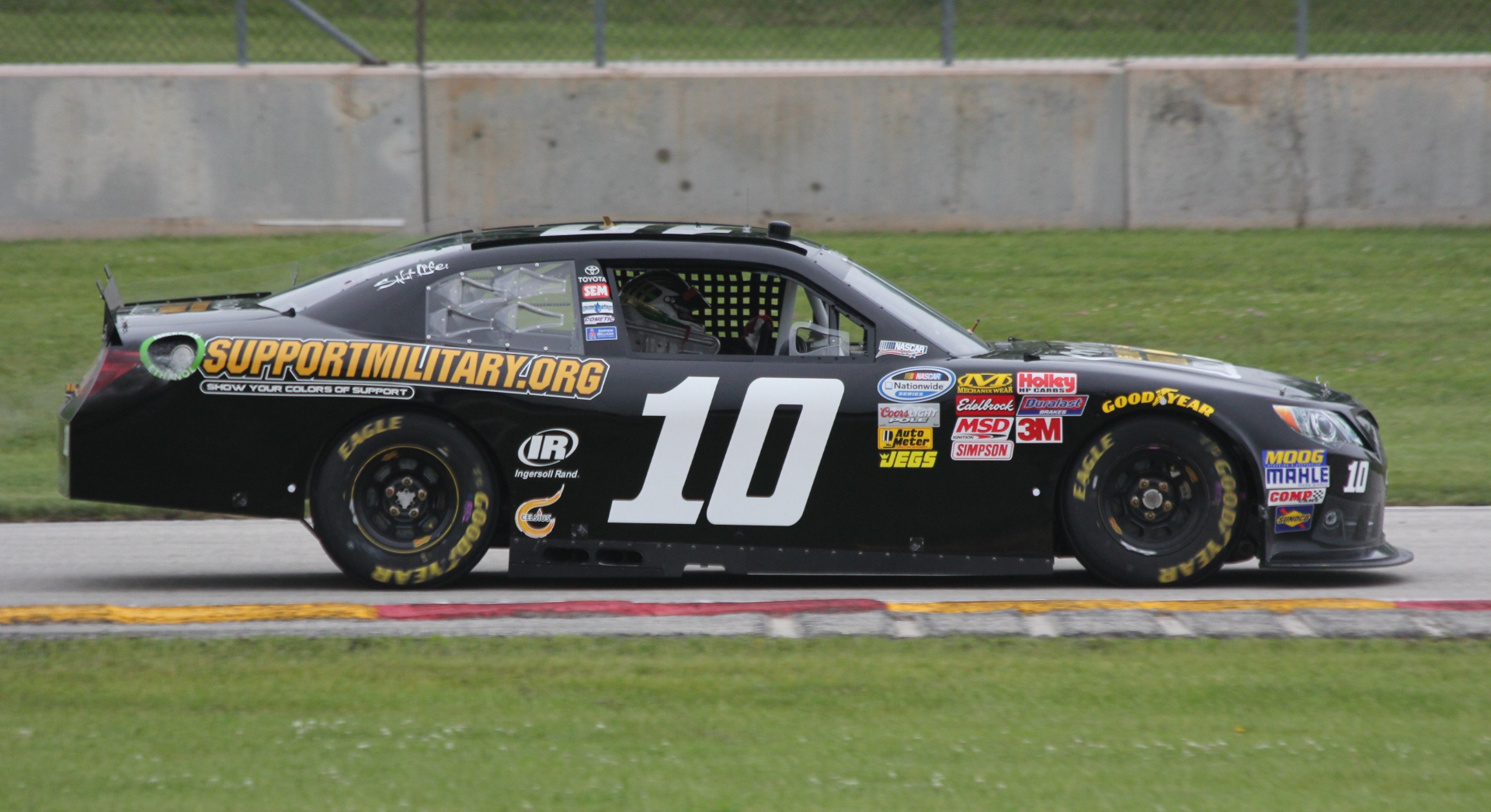
Jeff Green at Road America in 2014.

In 2014, David Starr ran the car competitively at Daytona season opener in February. For the rest of the year, Blake Koch and Jeff Green ran the majority of the races, again mostly as a start and park. At Daytona in July, Koch had sponsorship from Celsius Negative Calorie Cola, with TriStar bringing five cars to run the full race. During the first round of qualifying, all five TriStar cars were running in a pack when a sudden downpour of rain caused the entire pack to spin out, causing most of the cars including four from TriStar to wreck. Koch, along with the No. 91 Toyota Camry of Benny Gordon missed the race, and the sponsor of the No. 10 moved over to Mike Bliss' No. 19. Bliss ran the No. 10 at Bristol in August as a full race effort while Hermie Sadler ran his usual No. 19 Toyota Camry.

Jeff Green returned in 2015 at Daytona in February. After Scott Lagasse Jr. and the No. 19 team failed to qualify, Lagasse Jr. and sponsor Alert Today Florida moved over to the No. 10 car for the race, finishing 37th after a crash. The No. 10 team has been renumbered as the No. 19, carrying the owner points from the No. 10. The change came after the return of Eric McClure.

The No. 10 was revived for 2016 beginning at Atlanta, with Green and Matt DiBenedetto once again running in a start-and-park capacity.

=== Car No. 10 results ===
NASCAR Xfinity Series results
Year	Driver	No.	Make	1	2	3	4	5	6	7	8	9	10	11	12	13	14	15	16	17	18	19	20	21	22	23	24	25	26	27	28	29	30	31	32	33	34	35	Owners	Pts
2010	Kevin Hamlin	36	Chevy	DAY	CAL	LVS	BRI	NSH	PHO	TEX	TAL	RCH	DAR	DOV	CLT	NSH	KEN	ROA	NHA	DAY	CHI; DNQ				GLN; 42	MCH									GTY; 43				N/A	N/A
2010	Johnny Sauter	36	Chevy																			GTY; 41																	N/A	N/A
2010	Jeff Green	36	Chevy																				IRP; 40	IOW; 43			BRI; 43	CGV; 42	ATL; 43	RCH	DOV; 43	KAN; 43	CAL; 43	CLT; 42		TEX; DNQ	PHO; 43	HOM; 43	N/A	N/A
2012	Jeff Green	10	Toyota	DAY; 43	PHO; 43	LVS; 40	BRI; 42	CAL; 43	TEX; 43	RCH; 43	TAL; 39						ROA; 43	KEN; 42	DAY; 43	NHA; 43	CHI; 43	IND; 36		GLN; 40	CGV; 43	BRI; 42	ATL; 35	RCH; 43	CHI; 31				KAN; 42		PHO; 23				39th	182
2012	Tony Raines	10	Toyota									DAR; 36																											39th	182
2012	Kevin Lepage	10	Toyota										IOW; 41	CLT; 43	DOV; 39	MCH; 42																							39th	182
2012	Mike Bliss	10	Toyota																				IOW; 20											TEX; 18		HOM; 19			39th	182
2012	Charles Lewandoski	10	Toyota																											KEN; 43	DOV; 43	CLT; 42							39th	182
2013	Jeff Green	10	Toyota	DAY; 40	PHO; 37	LVS; 38	BRI; 37	CAL; 37	TEX; 40	RCH; 40	TAL; 40	DAR; 37	CLT; Wth	DOV; 35	IOW; 40	MCH; 36	ROA; 40	KEN; 40	DAY; Wth	NHA; 40	CHI; 37	IND; 40	IOW; 40	GLN; 37					CHI; 40	KEN; 40	DOV; 35	KAN; 40	CLT; 40		PHO; 40				40th	191
2013	Chase Miller	10	Toyota																						MOH; 39		ATL; 38	RCH; 39											40th	191
2013	Cole Whitt	10	Toyota																							BRI; 14													40th	191
2013	Michael McDowell	10	Toyota																															TEX; 40					40th	191
2013	Mike Bliss	10	Toyota																																	HOM; 37			40th	191
2014	David Starr	10	Toyota	DAY; 25																													CLT; 20						36th	270
2014	Blake Koch	10	Toyota		PHO; 39		BRI; 40	CAL; 39	TEX; 40	DAR; 40		TAL; 40		CLT; Wth	DOV; 40				DAY; DNQ	NHA; 39	CHI; 39	IND; 40	IOW; 38	GLN; 38	MOH; 35				CHI; 40			KAN; 36		TEX; 39					36th	270
2014	Jeff Green	10	Toyota			LVS; 40					RCH; 38		IOW; 39				ROA; 36	KEN; 39									ATL; 40			KEN; 40					PHO; 34				36th	270
2014	Kevin Lepage	10	Toyota													MCH; 39															DOV; 31								36th	270
2014	Mike Bliss	10	Toyota																							BRI; 17		RCH; 20											36th	270
2014	Ross Chastain	10	Toyota																																	HOM; 14			36th	270
2015	Scott Lagasse Jr.	10	Toyota	DAY; 37																																			N/A	13
2015	Jeff Green	10	Toyota	DAY; QL	ATL	LVS; 40	PHO; 40	CAL; 40	TEX; 38	BRI; 39	RCH; 40	TAL; QL																											N/A	13
2015	Charles Lewandoski	10	Toyota									TAL; 40	IOW	CLT	DOV	MCH	CHI	DAY	KEN	NHA	IND	IOW	GLN	MOH	BRI	ROA	DAR	RCH	CHI	KEN	DOV	CLT	KAN	TEX	PHO	HOM			N/A	13
2016	Jeff Green	10	Toyota	DAY	ATL; 40	LVS; 40	PHO; 40		TEX; DNQ			TAL; 40											GLN; 33	MOH; 40		ROA; 39								TEX; 40					49th	41
2016	Matt DiBenedetto	10	Toyota					CAL; 40		BRI; 40	RCH; Wth		DOV; 38	CLT; 40	POC; 40	MCH; 40			KEN; 40	NHA; 40	IND; 38				BRI; 40		DAR; 40	RCH; 40	CHI; 40		DOV; 40	CLT; Wth			PHO; 40	HOM; 40			49th	41
2016	Tyler Young	10	Toyota														IOW; 39	DAY																					49th	41
2016	Mike Bliss	10	Toyota																			IOW; 39								KEN; 40									49th	41
2016	Josh Wise	10	Toyota																														KAN; DNQ						49th	41

=== Car No. 14 history ===
==== 2010 ====
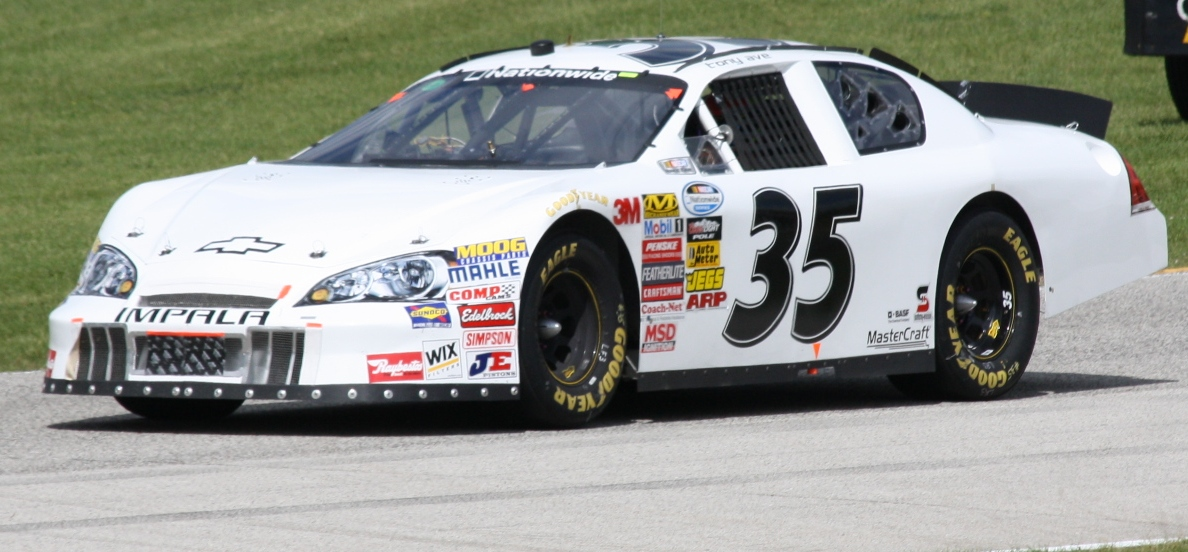
No. 35 driven by Tony Ave at Road America in 2010

What is now the No. 14 Chevrolet Impala debuted in 2010 as the No. 35 Chevrolet Impala. At the time it was a completely new entry, consisting of veteran Jason Keller as the driver and former Rusty Wallace Racing crew chief Bryan Berry atop the pit box. During their first attempt at Daytona, the No. 35 missed the race due to not having a top-35 points position and being unable to qualify on time. The team would go on to miss the races at Daytona, Las Vegas, and Texas, while successfully making the race Stater Brothers 300 in California, starting 21st and finishing 20th during the team's first race. The team would eventually make the top-35, a notable accomplishment for a team that missed 3 races during the season. The No. 35 and Keller got their first top 10 finish in the form of a top 5, finishing 4th at Talladega. At the inaugural event at Road America, the team selected Tony Ave to drive the No. 35, Ave being a road course ace with much success at the track. He qualified the car in 10th place, and was running 5th when he was spun on the last lap of the race, finishing 20th. Ave returned to the seat at the 2010 NAPA 200 in Montreal, leading 1 lap but finishing 36th. He drove at the Watkins Glen too, finishing 15th.

Antonio Pérez drove the car at Gateway International Raceway, finishing 34th. Tony Raines drove the No. 35 at Phoenix International Raceway with sponsorship from BeAStockCarDriver.com. The No. 35 finished 29th in the 2010 owners points.

The team managed to put together some one race sponsorship deals for various races during the season. The No. 35 and Keller managed to get sponsorship from uPillar.com at Darlington, KEL Chemicals at Dover for Kellers 500th career start, and LubePros.com at Chicagoland Speedway. BeAStockCarDriver.com sponsored Keller at Charlotte in October.

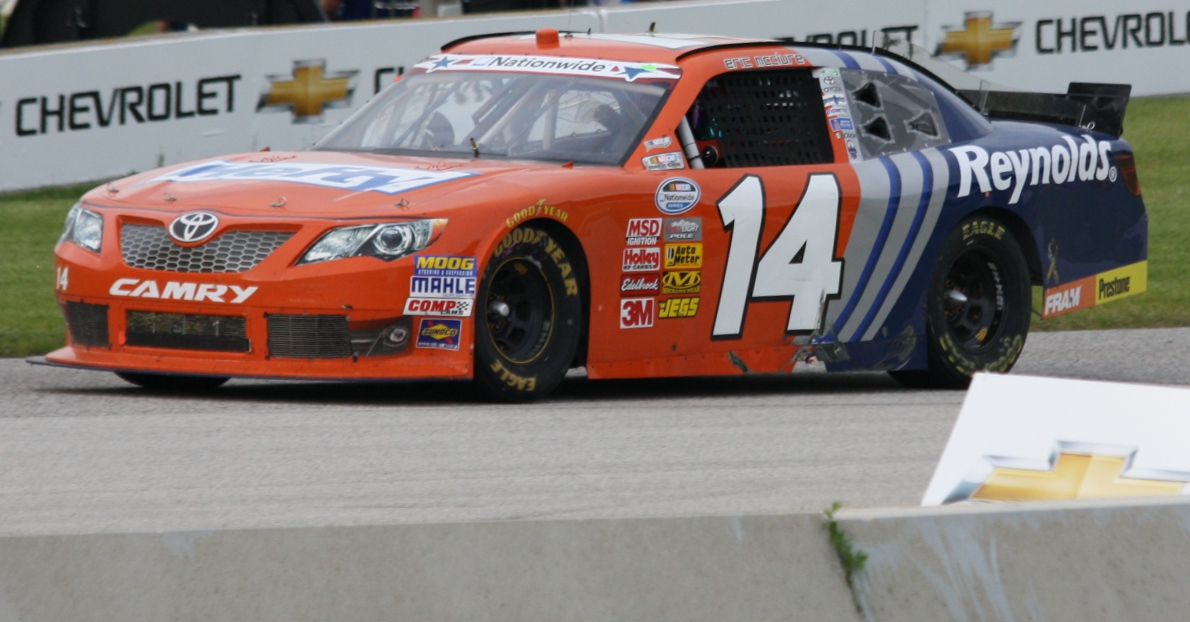
Eric McClure's Hefty/Reynolds Wrap Toyota at Road America in 2013.

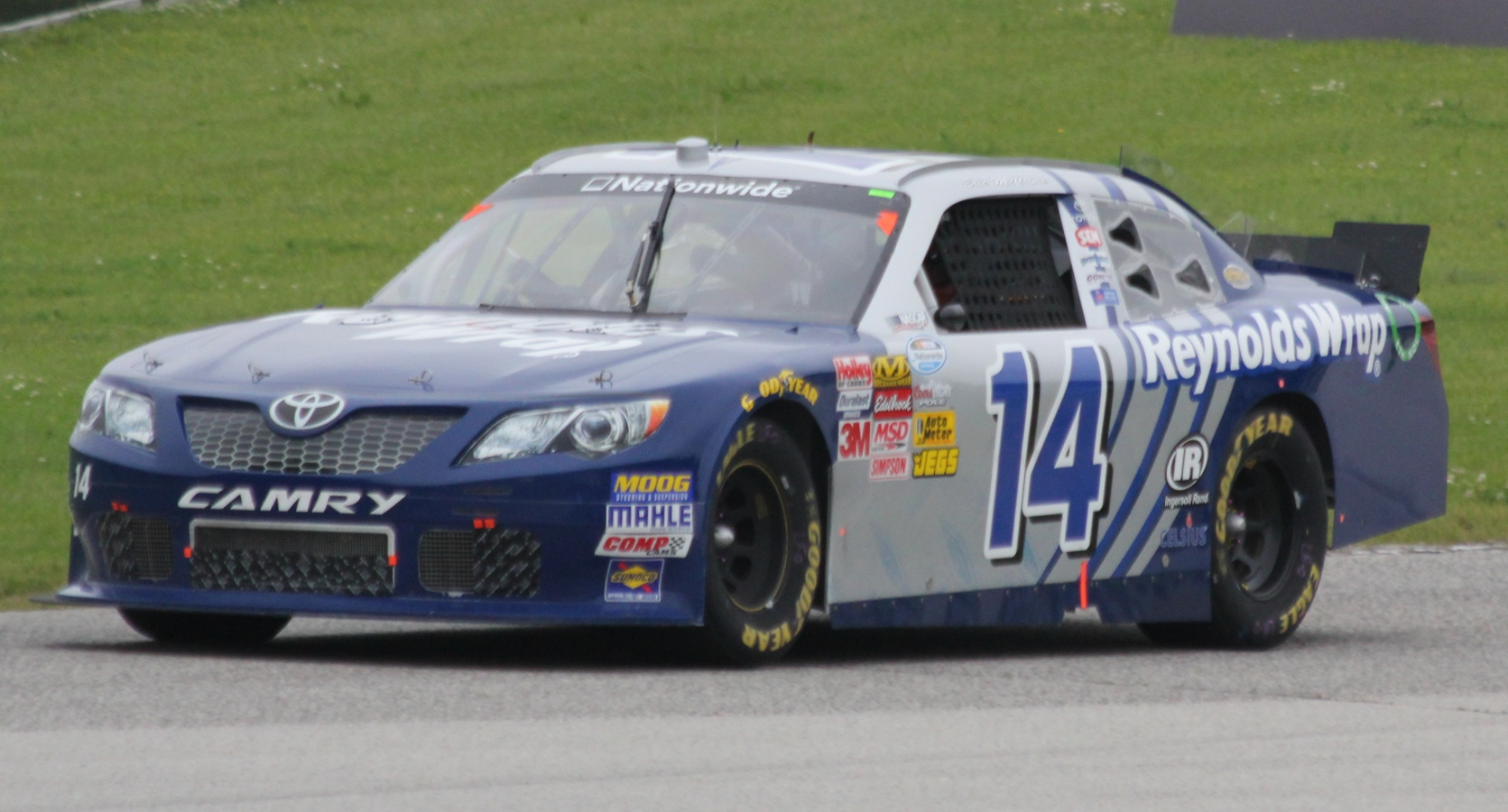
The alternate Reynolds Wrap scheme run by McClure at Road America in 2014.

==== 2011 ====
The team returned to competition in 2011 as the No. 14, with Eric McClure and his longtime sponsor Hefty coming along with him from Team Rensi Motorsports. Mike Bliss drove the No. 14 unsponsored at Dover when the car fell out of the top-30 in owners points. McClure made all 34 races that year, scoring a best finish of 18th at Chicago en route to a 19th-place points finish. McClure and Hefty returned in 2012, along with the team's manufacturer switch to Toyota Camry.

==== 2012 ====
McClure started the season in the No. 14 Toyota Camry. He ran at the end of the first seven races before a crash at Talladega took him out of action. Jeff Green moved from the start-and-park No. 10 to the No. 14 while McClure recovered. McClure returned at Road America, moving Green back to the No. 10.

==== 2013 ====
A fully recovered McClure remained in the No. 14. Though he had an illness before the Mid-Ohio race was replaced by Jeff Green.

==== 2014 ====
Eric McClure returned for what was believed to be his final season. He ran at 28 races. Longtime partners Hefty and Reynolds Wrap once again sponsored the car. Teammate Jeff Green piloted the No. 14 in 5 races: Dover in May, Michigan in June, Mid-Ohio in August, Richmond in September, and Dover again in September. At Mid-Ohio, Green was running second with 20 laps to go when the throttle of the No. 14 Toyota Camry hung out, sending him head-on into a tire barrier, relegating him to a 29th-place finish.

==== 2015 ====
After the season, McClure and Hefty/Reynolds Wrap announced their departure for JGL Racing. Cale Conley drove the No. 14 Toyota Camry for the full 2015 season, running for Rookie of the Year with crew chief Eddie Pardue. However, Conley was released with three races to go due to lack of sponsorship. Mike Bliss returned to TriStar at Texas, parking the No. 14 after 40 laps.

==== 2016 ====
Benny Gordon and VSI Racing ran the No. 14 at Daytona. J. J. Yeley drove the car for six races beginning at Atlanta. Jeff Green took over the car when Yeley replaced David Starr in the No. 44. Hermie Sadler would drive at Bristol and Richmond with sponsorship from Virginia Lottery. The No. 14 would serve as a start and park along with the No. 10 unless Gordon, Sadler and DiBenedetto were in the car. DiBenedetto drove 2 races in the No. 14 car at Kansas and Texas with an 11th place finish and a 36th place finish sponsored by Superior Essex.

==== 2017 ====
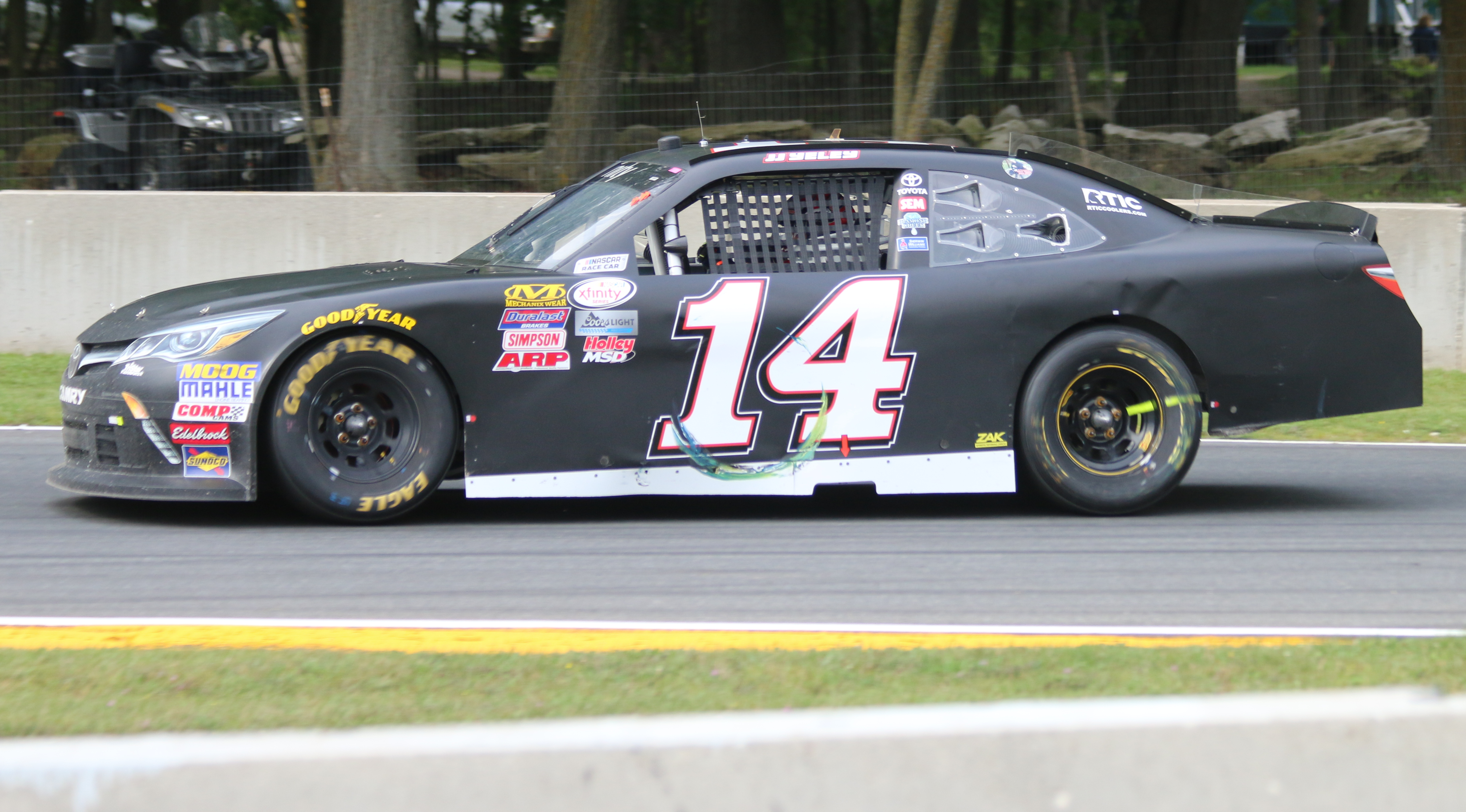
J. J. Yeley's No. 14 at Road America in 2017.

On January 26, 2017, it was announced that Yeley returned to TriStar but driving the No. 14 with Superior Essex sponsoring 13 races. Yeley would have a quiet, but a consistent year, only finishing outside the top 20 11 times - 5 were DNFs - with also a strong outing at the 2nd Iowa race, finishing 6th, plus the 11th place finishes he got at the spring Bristol and Talladega races. He finished 14th in points.

The team sold its cars and equipment to the new JP Motorsports team in 2018.

=== Car No. 14 results ===
NASCAR Xfinity Series results
Year	Driver	No.	Make	1	2	3	4	5	6	7	8	9	10	11	12	13	14	15	16	17	18	19	20	21	22	23	24	25	26	27	28	29	30	31	32	33	34	35	Owners	Pts
2010	Jason Keller	35	Chevy	DAY; DNQ	CAL; 20	LVS; DNQ	BRI; 27	NSH; 38	PHO; 22	TEX; DNQ	TAL; 4	RCH; 14	DAR; 21	DOV; 33	CLT; 19	NSH; 20	KEN; 23		NHA; 15	DAY; 20	CHI; 30	GTY; 34	IRP; 32	IOW; 26		MCH; 23	BRI; 12		ATL; 18	RCH; 23	DOV; 27	KAN; 27	CAL; 16	CLT; 32		TEX; 29		HOM; 27	29th	N/A
2010	Tony Ave	35	Chevy															ROA; 20							GLN; 15			CGV; 36											29th	N/A
2010	Antonio Pérez	35	Chevy																																GTY; 34				29th	N/A
2010	Tony Raines	35	Chevy																																		PHO; 19		29th	N/A
2011	Eric McClure	14	Chevy	DAY; 33	PHO; 25	LVS; 20	BRI; 25	CAL; 21	TEX; 31	TAL; 26	NSH; 32	RCH; 32	DAR; 36		IOW; 23	CLT; 28	CHI; 18	MCH; 29	ROA; 27	DAY; 37	KEN; 27	NHA; 20	NSH; 23	IRP; 21	IOW; 26	GLN; 35	CGV; 36	BRI; 27	ATL; 28	RCH; 30	CHI; 25	DOV; 24	KAN; 31	CLT; 31	TEX; 24	PHO; 19	HOM; 29		27th	582
2011	Mike Bliss	14	Chevy											DOV; 15																									27th	582
2012	Eric McClure	14	Toyota	DAY; 22	PHO; 28	LVS; 25	BRI; 27	CAL; 26	TEX; 24	RCH; 31	TAL; 27						ROA; 21	KEN; 26	DAY; 18	NHA; 22	CHI; 24	IND; 24	IOW; 31	GLN; 26	CGV; 19	BRI; 27	ATL; 21	RCH; 26	CHI; 25	KEN; 22	DOV; 26	CLT; 22	KAN; 15	TEX; 21	PHO; 20	HOM; 27			24th	662
2012	Jeff Green	14	Toyota									DAR; 19	IOW; 32	CLT; 32	DOV; 17	MCH; 17																							24th	662
2013	Eric McClure	14	Toyota	DAY; 8	PHO; 29	LVS; 40	BRI; 21	CAL; 27	TEX; 30	RCH; 26	TAL; 23	DAR; 26	CLT; 30	DOV; 24	IOW; 18	MCH; 28	ROA; 27	KEN; 23	DAY; 24	NHA; 31	CHI; 28	IND; 31	IOW; 23	GLN; 28					CHI; 25	KEN; 24	DOV; 26	KAN; 27	CLT; 33		PHO; 27				24th	608
2013	Jeff Green	14	Toyota																						MOH; 24	BRI; 16	ATL; 29	RCH; 22						TEX; 27		HOM; 20			24th	608
2014	Eric McClure	14	Toyota	DAY; 35	PHO; 23	LVS; 27	BRI; 27	CAL; 25	TEX; 24	DAR; 21	RCH; 29	TAL; 17	IOW; 24	CLT; 29			ROA; 20	KEN; 24	DAY; 22	NHA; 26	CHI; 25	IND; 36	IOW; 23	GLN; 24		BRI; 20	ATL; 24		CHI; 26	KEN; 31		KAN; 19	CLT; 32	TEX; 26	PHO; 26	HOM; 26			25th	615
2014	Jeff Green	14	Toyota												DOV; 18	MCH; 23									MOH; 29			RCH; 30			DOV; 26								25th	615
2015	Cale Conley	14	Toyota	DAY; 30	ATL; 35	LVS; 25	PHO; 22	CAL; 16	TEX; 34	BRI; 19	RCH; 25	TAL; 24	IOW; 19	CLT; 34	DOV; 33	MCH; 26	CHI; 20	DAY; 32	KEN; 29	NHA; 21	IND; 21	IOW; 23	GLN; 21	MOH; 20	BRI; 18	ROA; 37	DAR; 19	RCH; 22	CHI; 33	KEN; 16	DOV; 29	CLT; 26	KAN; 30						26th	586
2015	Mike Bliss	14	Toyota																															TEX; 36	PHO; 35	HOM; 37			26th	586
2016	Benny Gordon	14	Toyota	DAY; 35								TAL; 14						DAY; 23																					30th	390
2016	J. J. Yeley	14	Toyota		ATL; 19	LVS; 21	PHO; 20	CAL; 27	TEX; 38	BRI; 38																													30th	390
2016	Jeff Green	14	Toyota								RCH; 37		DOV; 33	CLT; 34	POC; 34	MCH; 33	IOW; 33		KEN; 33	NHA; 35	IND; 36	IOW; 31					DAR; 30		CHI; 31	KEN; 32	DOV; 32	CLT; 37							30th	390
2016	Tomy Drissi	14	Toyota																				GLN; 36			ROA; 26													30th	390
2016	Mike Bliss	14	Toyota																					MOH; 26															30th	390
2016	Hermie Sadler	14	Toyota																						BRI; 34			RCH; 28											30th	390
2016	Matt DiBenedetto	14	Toyota																														KAN; 11	TEX; 36					30th	390
2016	Cole Whitt	14	Toyota																																PHO; 16	HOM; 18			30th	390
2017	J. J. Yeley	14	Toyota	DAY; 25	ATL; 36	LVS; 22	PHO; 16	CAL; 16	TEX; 22	BRI; 11	RCH; 39	TAL; 11	CLT; 22	DOV; 15	POC; 19	MCH; 38	IOW; 13	DAY; 13	KEN; 25	NHA; 15	IND; 15	IOW; 6	GLN; 39	MOH; 13	BRI; 16	ROA; 17	DAR; 19	RCH; 20	CHI; 21	KEN; 19	DOV; 17	CLT; 19	KAN; 20	TEX; 18	PHO; 20	HOM; 22			20th	588

=== Car No. 19 history ===
==== 2010 ====
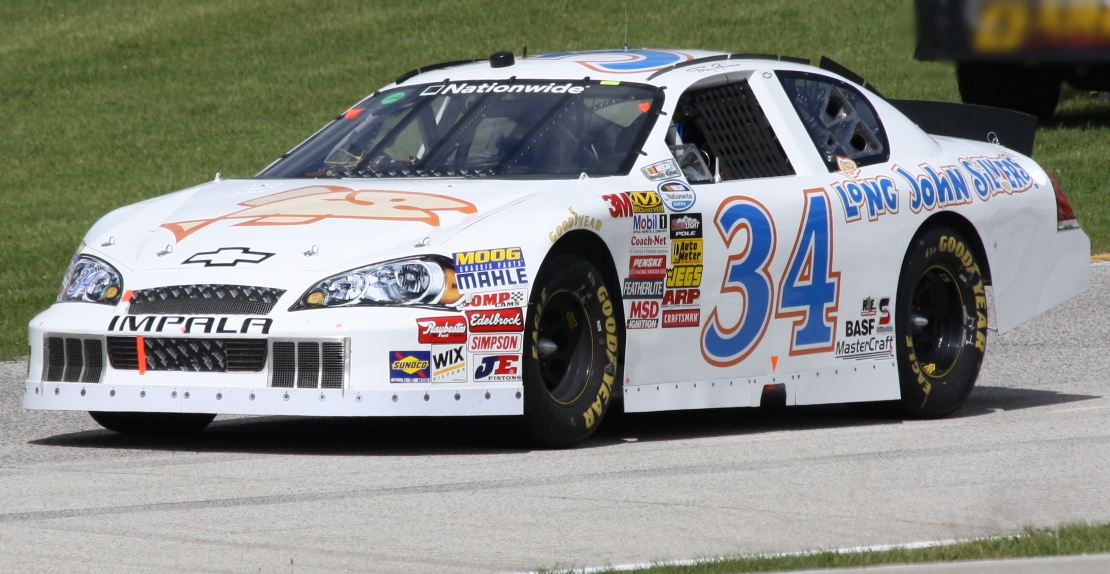
No. 34 driven by Tony Raines in 2010

What is now the No. 19 team was previously the No. 34 team from the 2010 season. TriStar acquired the team from Front Row Motorsports following the 2009 season. It remained mostly intact, with Scott Eggleston returning as crew chief and Tony Raines returning as the driver of the Long John Silver's entry, and with the previous years owners points transferring over which locked the team into the first 5 races of the season. During the first race for the new team at Daytona, Raines and the No. 34 Chevrolet Impala lead 3 laps and finished 14th despite being involved in 2 incidents. Alongside his teammate, Raines and the crew scored the seasons first top-10 in the Aaron's 312 at Talladega Superspeedway in Alabama, finishing 7th after running in the top-5 for various parts of the race. Raines got his second top 10 of the season at Gateway, finishing tenth. Charles Lewandoski started and parked the No. 34 at Phoenix International Raceway in November, with Raines in the No. 35 for that race. Dave Fuge became crew chief of the team in the second half of the season. The No. 34 finished 23rd in final owners points, with Raines finishing 17th in driver standings in 2010.

The team managed to put together some one race sponsorship deals for various races for during the season. The No. 34 and Raines was funded by Planet Hollywood Resort and Casino at California, doorstopnation.com at Daytona & Talladega, Continental Fire & Safety at Dover, and Boss Industries/The Walter Payton Foundation at Chicagoland. Front Row Motorsports' owner Bob Jenkins pulled the Long John Silver's sponsorship from the team following the race at Bristol Motor Speedway in August, with BeAStockCarDriver.com sponsoring Raines for the final 4 races of the season. Raines was replaced by Nationwide Series veteran Mike Bliss.

==== 2011–2012 ====
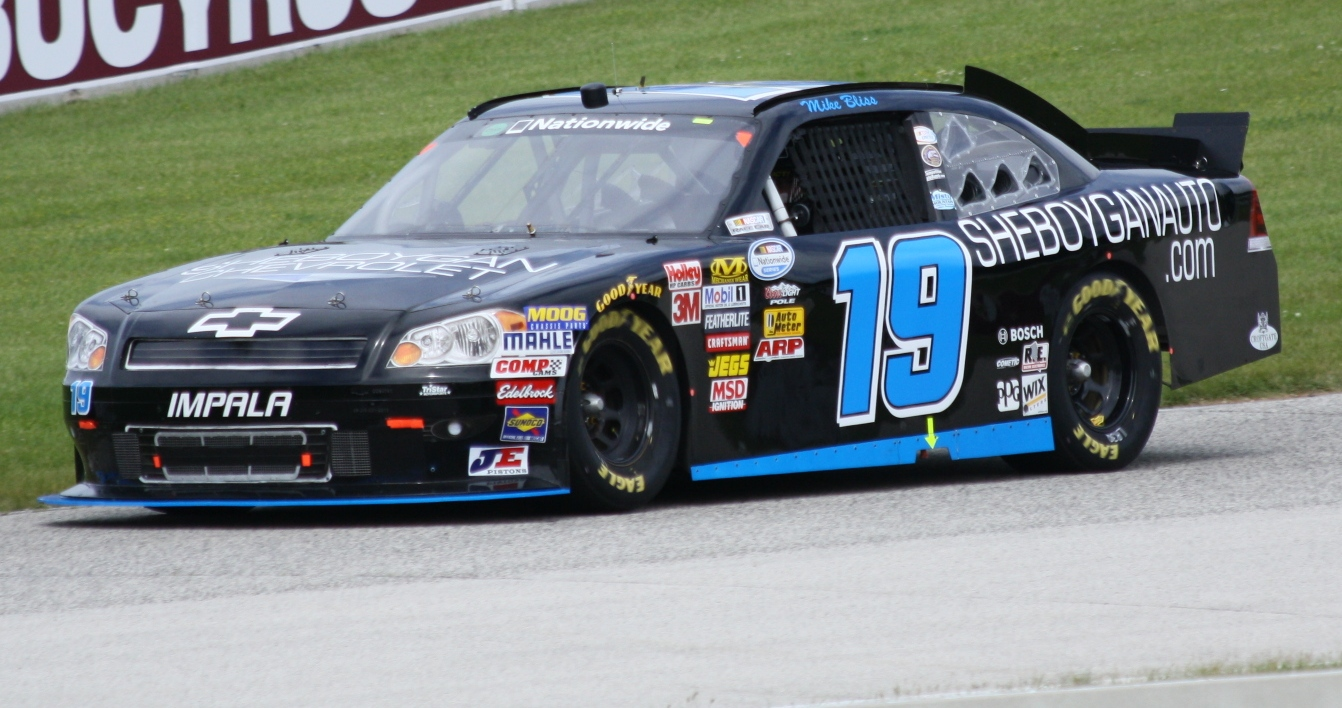
Mike Bliss at Road America in 2011.

The team returned in 2011 as the No. 19, and Mike Bliss signed on to drive the car for the 2011 season. Crew Chief Dave Fuge remained with the team but was replaced early in the season by Wes Ward. Fuge now is part owner of Derrike Cope's CFK Motorsports. Ward also left the team early on and was replaced by TRG interim crew chief Paul Clapprood. The team scored 19 top-20 finishes with a best finish of 9th at the second Dover race. With limited sponsorship Bliss and the No. 19 team finished the season 12th in points. For 2012, Bliss was replaced by Tayler Malsam as he brought sponsorship from Green Earth Technologies and G-Oil as well as the team's manufacturer change to Toyota Camry. Venezuelan Alex Popow drove the car at Watkins Glen. Malsam was 13th in points when he and TriStar parted ways after Kentucky, leaving Bliss to return to the No. 19. Also, Hal Martin competed in three races in 2012.

==== 2013 ====
Mike Bliss took over the No. 19 Toyota Camry once again for the full season. G-Oil and Tweaker Energy Shot sponsored the car. Dakoda Armstrong ran the car at Homestead with sponsor WinField, while Bliss ran the No. 10. Bliss would just miss the top 10 in points.

==== 2014 ====
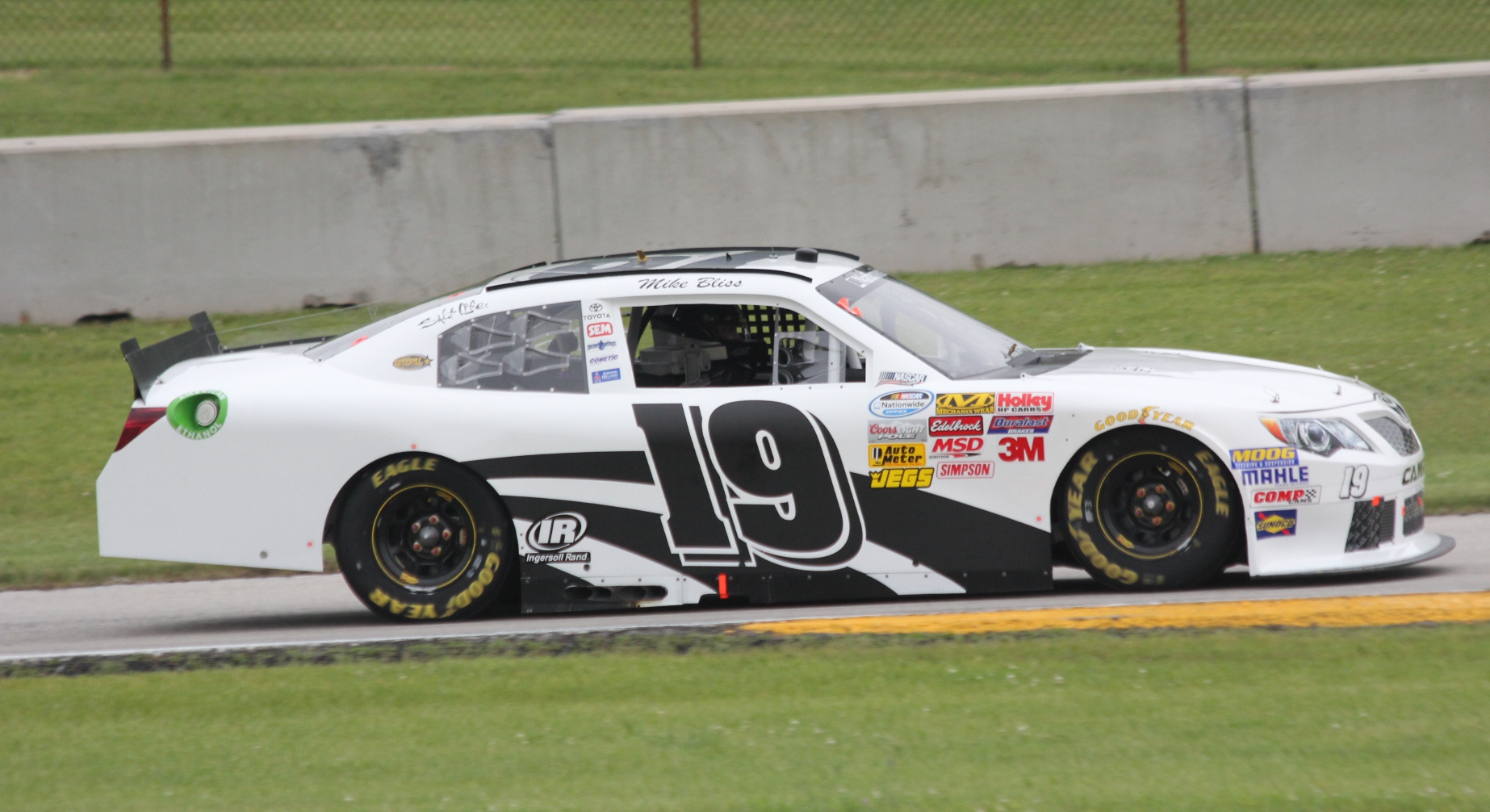
Mike Bliss at Road America in 2014.

Mike Bliss was once again in the car full-time, with Tweaker Energy Shot sponsoring several races. Hermie Sadler ran the No. 19 Toyota Camry at Bristol in August and Richmond in September, with the Virginia State Lottery sponsoring, while Bliss moved to the No. 10.

==== 2015 ====
Mike Bliss returned to the No. 19 Toyota Camry in 2015. Scott Lagasse Jr. attempted the season opener at Daytona with sponsor Alert Today Florida, but failed to qualify and moved over to the No. 10 car for the race. Bliss then drove the car through Talladega, before being released by Charles Lewandoski for Iowa, where the No. 19 car had assumed the Start and Park role of the former No. 10 after the addition of McClure. For Charlotte, Jeff Green was tabbed as the driver for the No. 19 car, and remained there for the remainder of the season.

==== 2016 ====
The No. 19 was used by Joe Gibbs Racing in 2016.

=== Car No. 19 results ===
NASCAR Xfinity Series results
Year	Driver	No.	Make	1	2	3	4	5	6	7	8	9	10	11	12	13	14	15	16	17	18	19	20	21	22	23	24	25	26	27	28	29	30	31	32	33	34	35	Owners	Pts
2010	Tony Raines	34	Chevy	DAY; 14	CAL; 25	LVS; 22	BRI; 22	NSH; 32	PHO; 14	TEX; 22	TAL; 7	RCH; 24	DAR; 18	DOV; 17	CLT; 25	NSH; 23	KEN; 19	ROA; 36	NHA; 18	DAY; 24	CHI; 23	GTY; 10	IRP; 18	IOW; 29	GLN; 28	MCH; 24	BRI; 26	CGV; 34	ATL; 20	RCH; 18	DOV; 24	KAN; 25	CAL; 19	CLT; 20	GTY; 29	TEX; 25		HOM; 23	23rd	N/A
2010	Charles Lewandoski	34	Chevy																																		PHO; 40		23rd	N/A
2011	Mike Bliss	19	Chevy	DAY; 13	PHO; 20	LVS; 17	BRI; 26	CAL; 19	TEX; 19	TAL; 35	NSH; 31	RCH; 18	DAR; 30		IOW; 18	CLT; 18	CHI; 22	MCH; 23	ROA; 15	DAY; 20	KEN; 24	NHA; 14	NSH; 24	IRP; 11	IOW; 18	GLN; 22	CGV; 15	BRI; 18	ATL; 15	RCH; 12	CHI; 15	DOV; 9	KAN; 22	CLT; 20	TEX; 23	PHO; 31	HOM; 17		20th	817
2011	Eric McClure	19	Chevy											DOV; 25																									20th	817
2012	Tayler Malsam	19	Toyota	DAY; 6	PHO; 20	LVS; 16	BRI; 18	CAL; 16	TEX; 25	RCH; 25	TAL; 24	DAR; 31	IOW; 29	CLT; 20	DOV; 16	MCH; 21	ROA; 30	KEN; 23	DAY; 15	NHA; 20	CHI; 25	IND; 29	IOW; 22		CGV; 14	BRI; 12	ATL; 18	RCH; 19	CHI; 18	KEN; 23									20th	746
2012	Alex Popow	19	Toyota																					GLN; 38															20th	746
2012	Mike Bliss	19	Toyota																												DOV; 11	CLT; 36	KAN; 13		PHO; 13				20th	746
2012	Hal Martin	19	Toyota																															TEX; 30		HOM; 30			20th	746
2013	Mike Bliss	19	Toyota	DAY; 23	PHO; 14	LVS; 17	BRI; 13	CAL; 18	TEX; 20	RCH; 13	TAL; 14	DAR; 19	CLT; 19	DOV; 18	IOW; 10	MCH; 21	ROA; 33	KEN; 19	DAY; 14	NHA; 17	CHI; 19	IND; 36	IOW; 18	GLN; 27	MOH; 17	BRI; 17	ATL; 22	RCH; 18	CHI; 23	KEN; 26	DOV; 10	KAN; 13	CLT; 15	TEX; 23	PHO; 17				18th	827
2013	Dakoda Armstrong	19	Toyota																																	HOM; 24			18th	827
2014	Mike Bliss	19	Toyota	DAY; 20	PHO; 17	LVS; 14	BRI; 26	CAL; 18	TEX; 32	DAR; 16	RCH; 16	TAL; 12	IOW; 31	CLT; 20	DOV; 22	MCH; 18	ROA; 10	KEN; 34	DAY; 38	NHA; 32	CHI; 19	IND; 22	IOW; 16	GLN; 14	MOH; 11		ATL; 17		CHI; 20	KEN; 24	DOV; 29	KAN; 14	CLT; 18	TEX; 18	PHO; 16	HOM; 23			20th	765
2014	Hermie Sadler	19	Toyota																							BRI; 24		RCH; 27											20th	765
2015	Scott Lagasse Jr.	19	Toyota	DAY; DNQ																																			40th	135
2015	Mike Bliss	19	Toyota		ATL; 25	LVS; 39	PHO; 20	CAL; 26	TEX; 24	BRI; 20	RCH; 23	TAL; 34																											40th	135
2015	Charles Lewandoski	19	Toyota										IOW; 39																										40th	135
2015	Jeff Green	19	Toyota											CLT; 40	DOV; 40	MCH; 39	CHI; 40	DAY; DNQ	KEN; 40	NHA; 40	IND; 40	IOW; 40	GLN; 40	MOH; 40	BRI; 40	ROA; 40	DAR; 38	RCH; 40	CHI; 40	KEN; 39	DOV; 40	CLT; 40	KAN; 40	TEX; 40	PHO; 40	HOM; 40			40th	135

=== Car No. 24 history ===
After initially leaving TriStar for JGL Racing, after nine 2015 races Eric McClure and longtime sponsor Hefty/Reynolds Wrap announced their return to TriStar beginning at Iowa Speedway in May. The team carried over the No. 24 Toyota Camry from JGL, while assuming the owner points from the No. 19 Toyota Camry. McClure was released again after changes with his Hefty/Reynolds Wrap sponsorship, with the number returning to JGL and the team going inactive.

=== Car No. 44 history ===
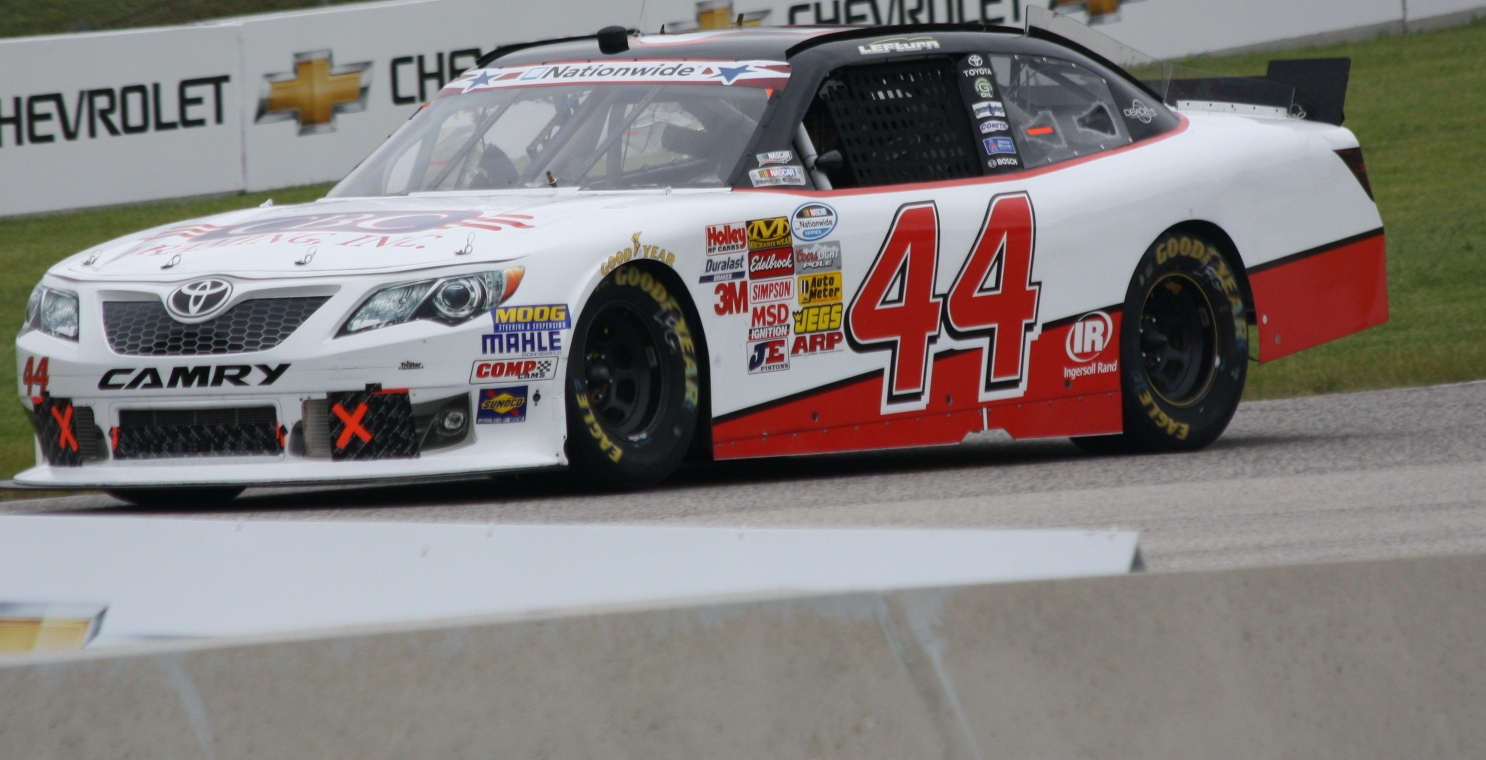
The No. 44 car in 2013, driven by Cole Whitt.

The No. 44 car was first run in 2011 by Jeff Green as a Start and park entry at Daytona. Charles Lewandoski drove the car at Phoenix. Green then drove the car for most of the season as a start and park, but was replaced for 3 races by Angela Cope. For 2012, Mike Bliss drove the car with various sponsorship until Dover when he moved back to the No. 19 Toyota Camry and Green took over for the next two races. Hal Martin and John Blankenship finished out the season. Though John Blankenship raced for Tommy Baldwin Racing for Chevrolet Impala for Iowa, Texas, Phoenix and Homestead.

==== 2013 ====
In 2013, Hal Martin ran for Rookie of the year with American Custom Yachts as the sponsor, but only ran the first ten races and then two late in the season. Chad Hackenbracht ran seven races with Ingersoll Rand and Tastee Apples sponsoring. Cole Whitt ran the most races for the team, with several strong runs including four top tens and only one finish outside the top twenty. Whitt was sponsored by Takagi Water Heaters and Gold Bond. Whitt left for Swan Racing in the Sprint Cup Series at the end of the season.

==== 2014 ====
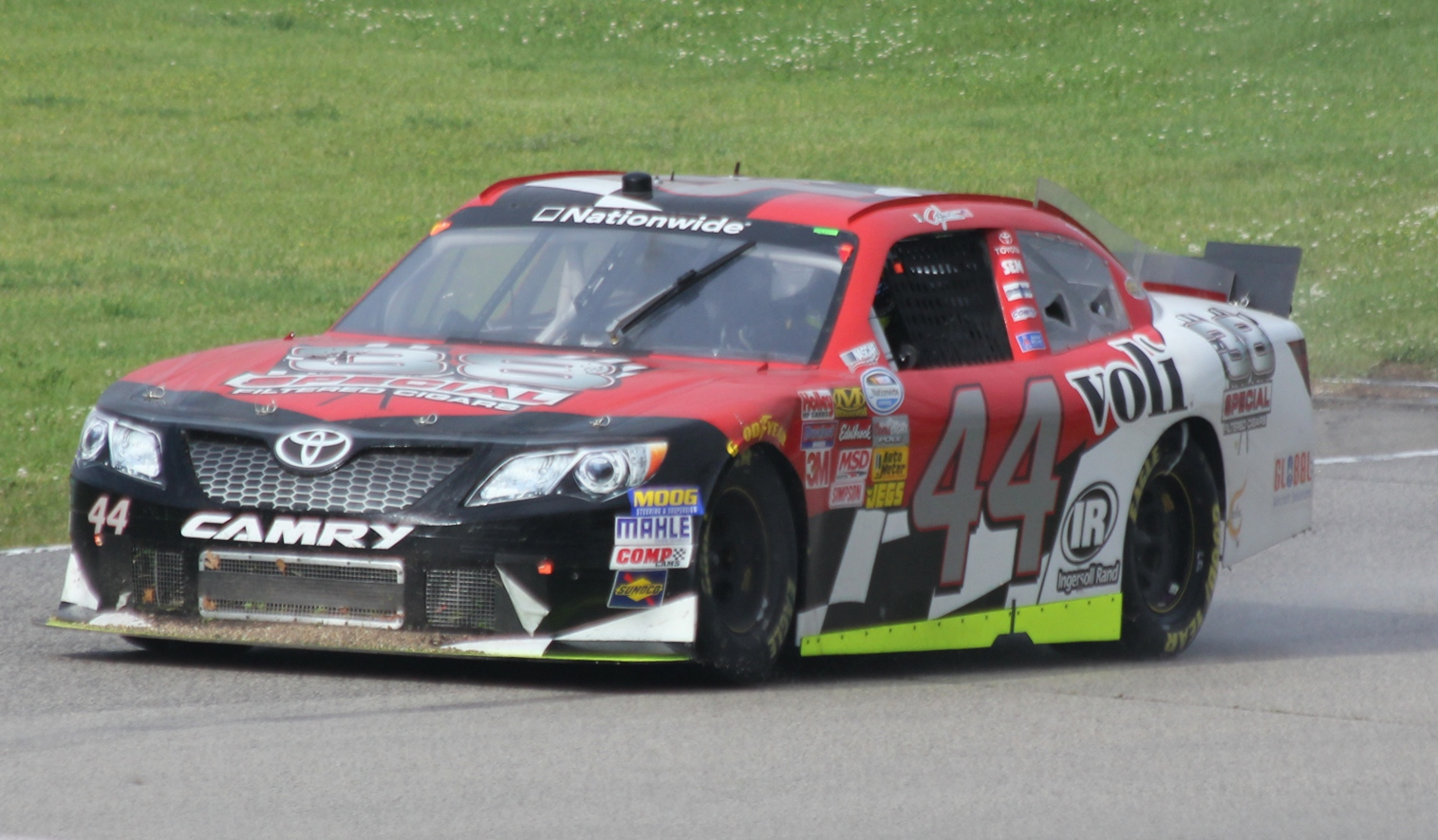
Carlos Contreras at Road America in 2014.

For 2014, it was announced that Blake Koch would drive for TriStar full-time, splitting time between the No. 44 Toyota Camry and the No. 10 Toyota Camry. David Starr ran the majority of races with the team, with a best finish of 9th at Talladega. Various other drivers have run the No. 44, bringing sponsorship with them. These include Hal Martin, Paulie Harraka, Carlos Contreras, ARCA driver Will Kimmel, and Matt Frahm.

Hal Martin returned to TriStar's No. 44 Toyota Camry for both races at Iowa Speedway in 2014. Stuart, Florida– American Custom Yachts returned as a sponsor for the team (not appearing on the hood), as they did in Martin's first 10 races of 2013. Martin finished 26th and 28th in his two races respectively.

Forty-four-year-old NASCAR veteran Carlos Contreras has raced all three road courses for TriStar in the No. 44 Toyota Camry with sponsors 38 Special and Voli and regular TriStar sponsor Ingersoll Rand. He posted a strong 15th place at Road America, a solid 23rd place at Watkins Glen International and finished 21st in his debut at the Mid-Ohio Sports Car Course in August.

Twenty-six-year-old ARCA driver Will Kimmel, nephew of ARCA legend Frank Kimmel, will drive five races in the TriStar No. 44 Toyota Camry in 2014. Ingersoll Rand will serve as the primary sponsor for all five races. Kimmel finished 33rd in his debut at Phoenix and 22nd two races later at Bristol. Kimmel returned to the car in the fall races at Richmond, Chicago, and Charlotte.

New Hampshire native Matt Frahm was announced as the driver at his hometown New Hampshire Motor Speedway in July for his tenth start in the Nationwide Series. Hudson, New Hampshire–based Gilchrist Metal Fabricating Company funded the car. Frahm finished a solid 25th, but 5 laps down.

NASCAR Drive for Diversity graduate and New Jersey native Paulie Harraka drive the No. 44 Toyota Camry at home track Dover International Speedway in May. The Delaware Office of Highway Safety came on board with their "Click it or Ticket" campaign to raise awareness for traffic safety. Harraka qualified 22nd, and finished a solid 19th after battling back from a pit road incident with Brendan Gaughan. Notably, Harraka was involved in an incident the prior year at the Sonoma Cup race where his No. 52 Ford Fusion collided with the TriStar No. 19 Toyota Camry on pit road before the race even started.

2014 driver rotation
No. 44 Driver	Races
David Starr	11
Blake Koch	10
Carlos Contreras	3
Will Kimmel	5
Hal Martin	2
Matt Frahm	1
Paulie Harraka	1

==== 2015 ====
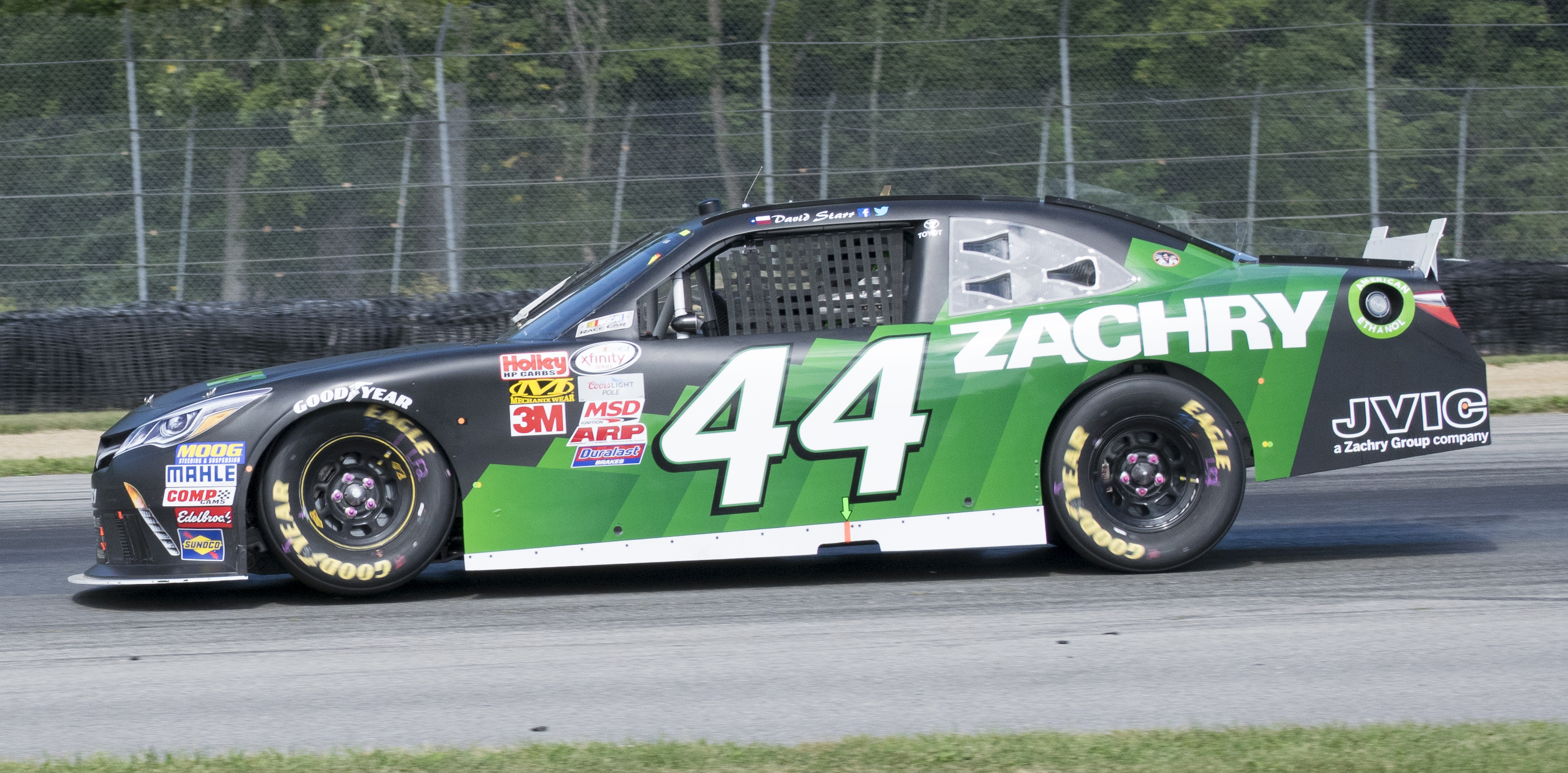
David Starr in the No. 44 at Mid-Ohio Sports Car Course in 2015

David Starr signed a three-year contract with TriStar and longtime sponsor Zachry Group to run the No. 44 Toyota Camry full-time beginning in 2015. Starr finished a strong 6th place at the season opener at Daytona International Speedway, after avoiding 2 big crashes in the late stages of the race. Starr had a decent season, finishing 16th in points.

==== 2016 ====
Starr returned in 2016, with Zachry continuing sponsor him. He finished 18th at the season opener at Daytona, and at Atlanta he finished 39th after blowing an engine in a few laps of the race. At Richmond in April, J. J. Yeley replaced Starr due to illness, finishing 12th. Following Richmond, Yeley officially replaced Starr in the No. 44. Yeley collected three top tens for TriStar, with an 8th place finish at fall Dover race.

==== 2017 ====
The car returned in a part-time basis in 2017. Benny Gordon drove at the PowerShares QQQ 300 at Daytona International Speedway with sponsorship from Florida Lottery. He was involved in a single-car crash, and finished 27th.

=== Car No. 44 results ===
NASCAR Xfinity Series results
Year	Driver	No.	Make	1	2	3	4	5	6	7	8	9	10	11	12	13	14	15	16	17	18	19	20	21	22	23	24	25	26	27	28	29	30	31	32	33	34	Owners	Pts
2011	Jeff Green	44	Chevy	DAY; 40		LVS; 42	BRI; 38	CAL; 37	TEX; 43	TAL; 43	NSH; 42	RCH; 40	DAR; 34	DOV; 41		CLT; 43	CHI; 40	MCH; 41	ROA; 38	DAY; 43	KEN; 37		NSH; 35	IRP; 33	IOW; 43	GLN; 43	CGV; 43	BRI; 43	ATL; 37	RCH; 36		DOV; 43	KAN; 41	CLT; 43	TEX; 42	PHO; 34	HOM; DNQ	36th	176
2011	Charles Lewandoski	44	Chevy		PHO; 21																																	36th	176
2011	Angela Ruch	44	Chevy												IOW; 28							NHA; 25									CHI; DNQ							36th	176
2012	Mike Bliss	44	Toyota	DAY; 39	PHO; 16	LVS; 15	BRI; 15	CAL; 17	TEX; 16	RCH; 17	TAL; 18	DAR; 15	IOW; 15	CLT; 12	DOV; 33	MCH; 13	ROA; 13	KEN; 17	DAY; 8	NHA; 13	CHI; 12	IND; 11		GLN; 14	CGV; 13	BRI; 13	ATL; 22	RCH; 15	CHI; 13	KEN; 18								14th	866
2012	John Blankenship	44	Chevy																				IOW; 23											TEX; 26	PHO; 25	HOM; 36		14th	866
2012	Jeff Green	44	Toyota																												DOV; 15	CLT; 16						14th	866
2012	Hal Martin	44	Toyota																														KAN; 25					14th	866
2013	Hal Martin	44	Toyota	DAY; 28	PHO; 23	LVS; 24	BRI; 31	CAL; 24	TEX; 38	RCH; 24	TAL; 34	DAR; 29	CLT; 23															RCH; 30				KAN; 35						20th	732
2013	Cole Whitt	44	Toyota											DOV; 16	IOW; 16	MCH; 15	ROA; 8	KEN; 31	DAY; 16			IND; 17	IOW; 20	GLN; 8			ATL; 20			KEN; 9	DOV; 16			TEX; 20		HOM; 9		20th	732
2013	Chad Hackenbracht	44	Toyota																	NHA; 21	CHI; 22				MOH; 30	BRI; 20			CHI; 21				CLT; 21		PHO; 24			20th	732
2014	Blake Koch	44	Toyota	DAY; 22		LVS; 20					RCH; 21					MCH; 24		KEN; 19									ATL; 28			KEN; 25	DOV; 23				PHO; 18	HOM; 22		23rd	681
2014	Will Kimmel	44	Toyota		PHO; 33		BRI; 22																					RCH; 25	CHI; 28				CLT; 38					23rd	681
2014	David Starr	44	Toyota					CAL; 24	TEX; 15	DAR; 35		TAL; 9		CLT; 24					DAY; 25		CHI; 22	IND; 25				BRI; 31						KAN; 15		TEX; 25				23rd	681
2014	Hal Martin	44	Toyota										IOW; 26										IOW; 28															23rd	681
2014	Paulie Harraka	44	Toyota												DOV; 19																							23rd	681
2014	Carlos Contreras	44	Toyota														ROA; 15							GLN; 23	MOH; 21													23rd	681
2014	Matt Frahm	44	Toyota																	NHA; 25																		23rd	681
2015	David Starr	44	Toyota	DAY; 6	ATL; 26	LVS; 17	PHO; 21	CAL; 15	TEX; 23	BRI; 18	RCH; 29	TAL; 14	IOW; 16	CLT; 22	DOV; 13	MCH; 33	CHI; 24	DAY; 29	KEN; 21	NHA; 22	IND; 36	IOW; 22	GLN; 26	MOH; 31	BRI; 20	ROA; 20	DAR; 22	RCH; 37	CHI; 23	KEN; 20	DOV; 18	CLT; 25	KAN; 22	TEX; 25	PHO; 21	HOM; 25		22nd	713
2016	David Starr	44	Toyota	DAY; 18	ATL; 39	LVS; 23	PHO; 22	CAL; 38	TEX; 18	BRI; 17																												18th	735
2016	J. J. Yeley	44	Toyota								RCH; 12	TAL; 22	DOV; 11	CLT; 23	POC; 13	MCH; 20	IOW; 20	DAY; 17	KEN; 17	NHA; 16	IND; 19	IOW; 14	GLN; 15	MOH; 35	BRI; 27	ROA; 10	DAR; 14	RCH; 20	CHI; 14	KEN; 14	DOV; 8	CLT; 27	KAN; 10	TEX; 17	PHO; 17	HOM; 13		18th	735
2017	Benny Gordon	44	Toyota	DAY; 27	ATL	LVS	PHO	CAL	TEX	BRI	RCH	TAL	CLT	DOV	POC	MCH	IOW	DAY	KEN	NHA	IND	IOW	GLN	MOH	BRI	ROA	DAR	RCH	CHI	KEN	DOV	CLT	KAN	TEX	PHO	HOM		49th	10

=== Car No. 91 history ===
TriStar occasionally ran a fifth car, usually for the restrictor plate races or as a start and park when the team's usual four cars have full sponsorship, or to help fund the No. 10 team.

==== 2014 ====
Jeff Green ran the car at Daytona in February and Auto Club in March, finishing last in both. He finished 39th at Darlington in April and 38th at Talladega in May. SupportMilitary.org and Hefty/Reynolds Wrap appeared on the car at various points, though not changing the team's start-and-park status. At Daytona in July, Benny Gordon attempted to qualify in the No. 91 Toyota Camry with BWP bats sponsoring, but did not post a fast enough speed before being taken out in a crash at the end of the first round. Green ran a total of seven races in the car, with Blake Koch running the car at Richmond.

=== Car No. 91 results ===
NASCAR Nationwide Series results
Year	Driver	No.	Make	1	2	3	4	5	6	7	8	9	10	11	12	13	14	15	16	17	18	19	20	21	22	23	24	25	26	27	28	29	30	31	32	33	Owners	Pts
2012	Jeff Green	91	Toyota	DAY	PHO	LVS	BRI	CAL	TEX	RCH	TAL	DAR	IOW	CLT	DOV	MCH	ROA	KEN	DAY	NHA	CHI	IND	IOW; 43	GLN	CGV	BRI	ATL	RCH	CHI	KEN	DOV	CLT	KAN	TEX; 37		HOM; 40	65th	13
2012	Tony Raines	91	Toyota																																PHO; 43		65th	13
2013	Chase Miller	91	Toyota	DAY	PHO	LVS	BRI	CAL	TEX	RCH	TAL	DAR	CLT	DOV	IOW	MCH	ROA	KEN	DAY	NHA	CHI	IND	IOW	GLN	MOH	BRI; 39	ATL	RCH	CHI	KEN	DOV	KAN	CLT	TEX	PHO		64th	9
2013	Michael McDowell	91	Toyota																																	HOM; 40	64th	9
2014	Jeff Green	91	Toyota	DAY; 40	PHO	LVS	BRI	CAL; 40	TEX	DAR; 39	RCH	TAL; 38	IOW	CLT	DOV	MCH	ROA	KEN								BRI; 40	ATL						CLT; 35	TEX	PHO	HOM; 40	54th	38
2014	Benny Gordon	91	Toyota																DAY; DNQ	NHA	CHI	IND	IOW	GLN	MOH												54th	38
2014	Blake Koch	91	Toyota																									RCH; 38	CHI	KEN	DOV	KAN					54th	38

== Pro Motor Engines ==
In addition to his racing operations, owner Bryan Smith operates Pro Motor Engines (PME Engines), an independent engine builder in NASCAR as well as ARCA and SCCA. Building and leasing primarily Chevrolet engines as well as the Toyota engines used by TriStar and others, PME-powered teams have won three Camping World Truck Series championships (2002, 2003, and 2009). Engine builders Dennis Borem and Darrell Hoffman also earned three consecutive MAHLE Clevite Engine Builder of the Year awards from 2007 to 2009, beating engine builders from Team Penske, DEI, Hendrick Motorsports, Toyota Racing Development, Roush-Yates, and other top-tier teams.
