= David Reutimann =

American racing driver (born 1970)

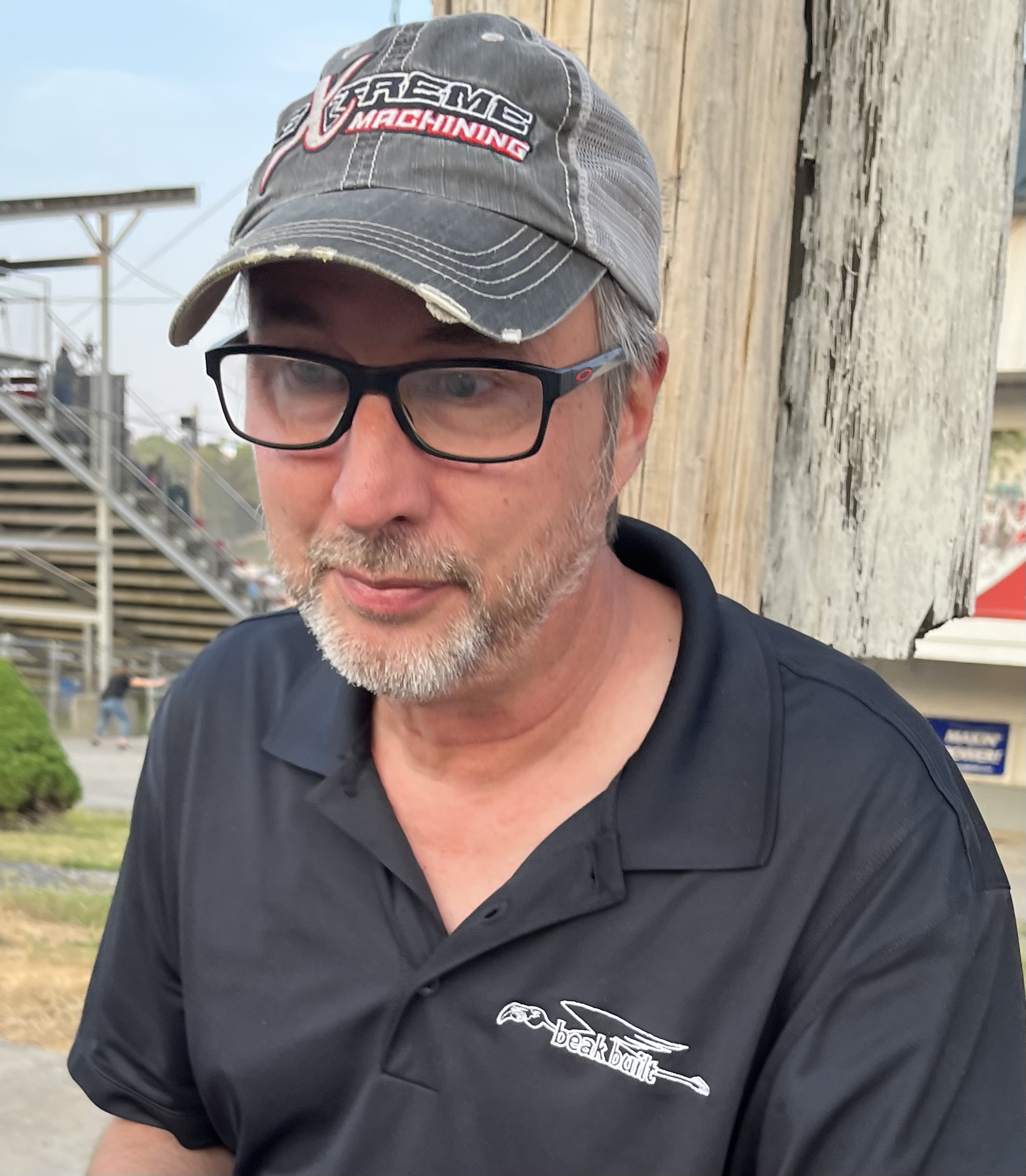
- Reutimann in 2023
- Born: Emil David Reutimann; March 2, 1970 (age 56); Zephyrhills, Florida, U.S.
- Achievements: 2009 Coca-Cola 600 Winner
- Awards: 2004 Craftsman Truck Series Rookie of the Year; 1997 Slim Jim All Pro Series Rookie of the Year

NASCAR Cup Series career
- 235 races run over 10 years
- 2014 position: 51st
- Best finish: 16th (2009)
- First race: 2005 UAW-GM Quality 500 (Charlotte)
- Last race: 2014 Toyota Owners 400 (Richmond)
- First win: 2009 Coca-Cola 600 (Charlotte)
- Last win: 2010 LifeLock.com 400 (Chicago)
Wins	Top tens	Poles
2	26	4

NASCAR O'Reilly Auto Parts Series career
- 127 races run over 10 years
- Best finish: 2nd (2007)
- First race: 2002 Hardee's 250 (Richmond)
- Last race: 2011 Food City 250 (Bristol)
- First win: 2007 Sam's Town 250 (Memphis)
Wins	Top tens	Poles
1	45	3

NASCAR FedEx Freight Truck Series career
- 79 races run over 5 years
- Best finish: 3rd (2006)
- First race: 2004 Florida Dodge Dealers 250 (Daytona)
- Last race: 2012 North Carolina Education Lottery 200 (Charlotte)
- First win: 2005 Toyota Tundra 200 (Nashville)
Wins	Top tens	Poles
1	38	6
- Statistics up to date as of April 26, 2014.

Emil David Reutimann (born March 2, 1970) is an American professional stock car racing crew chief and former driver. A native of Zephyrhills, Florida, he has competed in the NASCAR Sprint Cup Series, NASCAR Nationwide Series, and Camping World Truck Series. In 2004, he won NASCAR Rookie of the Year honors in the Craftsman Truck Series. He is the son of Buzzie Reutimann.

Reutimann began his racing career in dirt-track modifieds and late models. In 1997, he moved into the NASCAR regional series before moving to the Busch Series in 2002. He moved up to the Sprint Cup Series in 2007, driving for Michael Waltrip Racing. Between the 2007 and 2011 Sprint Cup seasons, Reutimann recorded two wins, 26 top-tens, and four pole positions.

== Personal life ==
Reutimann lives in Mooresville, North Carolina, with his wife Lisa and daughter Emilia. They are members of Berea Baptist Church in Mooresville.

While his father was competing on dirt tracks in the Northeast, Reutimann was a summer resident on a farm in the Asbury section of Franklin Township, Warren County, New Jersey.

Before he was a full-time race car driver, Reutimann worked briefly for the United Parcel Service, which in 2008 became his primary sponsor for the rest of that season.

Emilia is current a member of the Equestrian team for the South Carolina Gamecocks.

== Early career ==
Reutimann, a third-generation racer, began his racing career in dirt-track modifieds and late models before moving up to the Slim Jim All Pro Series in 1997. He was named Rookie of the Year, finishing in the top-ten eight times and had a fifth-place points finish. The next season, he dropped to seventh in points, but received the Sportsmanship award at season's end. After several years, Reutimann got his first three wins in 2002 and finished second in the overall championship standings.

That same year, Reutimann made his Busch Series debut at Richmond International Raceway. Driving the No. 87 GEICO Chevrolet Monte Carlo for NEMCO Motorsports, Reutimann started thirty-fourth but finished sixteenth. He led twelve laps at his next race at Memphis Motorsports Park, and finished in the top-fifteen in each of his next two races. In 2003, Reutimann won a contest named "Hills Bros. Coffee Break of a Lifetime", a contest where Hills Bros. Coffee selected one driver to receive full sponsorship from them for five Busch Series races, and if that driver were to score three top-tens in those races, they'd receive a chance to start a Cup race. He ran those five races, along with two extra races, for NEMCO Motorsports. He finished fifth at Nashville Speedway USA and The Milwaukee Mile, as well as qualifying Greg Biffle's car on the pole at Memphis. He also attempted the New England 300 and the Brickyard 400 in the Winston Cup Series in the No. 04 for Morgan-McClure Motorsports, but failed to qualify both times.

In 2004, Reutimann signed on with Darrell Waltrip Motorsports to race the NTN Bearings truck in the Craftsman Truck Series. Winning the pole in his second race at Atlanta Motor Speedway, Reutimann had four top-fives and finished fourteenth in points, garnering Rookie of the Year honors. Reutimann won his first career race in 2005 at Nashville Superspeedway, and ended the season thirteenth in points. He also made his Cup debut at Lowe's Motor Speedway, driving the No. 00 State Fair Corn Dogs Chevrolet Monte Carlo for Michael Waltrip. He finished 22nd. He went winless in 2006, but had two poles and finished third in the championship standings. He also made fifteen Busch starts and had four top-tens.

== Sprint Cup Series ==
=== 2007 ===
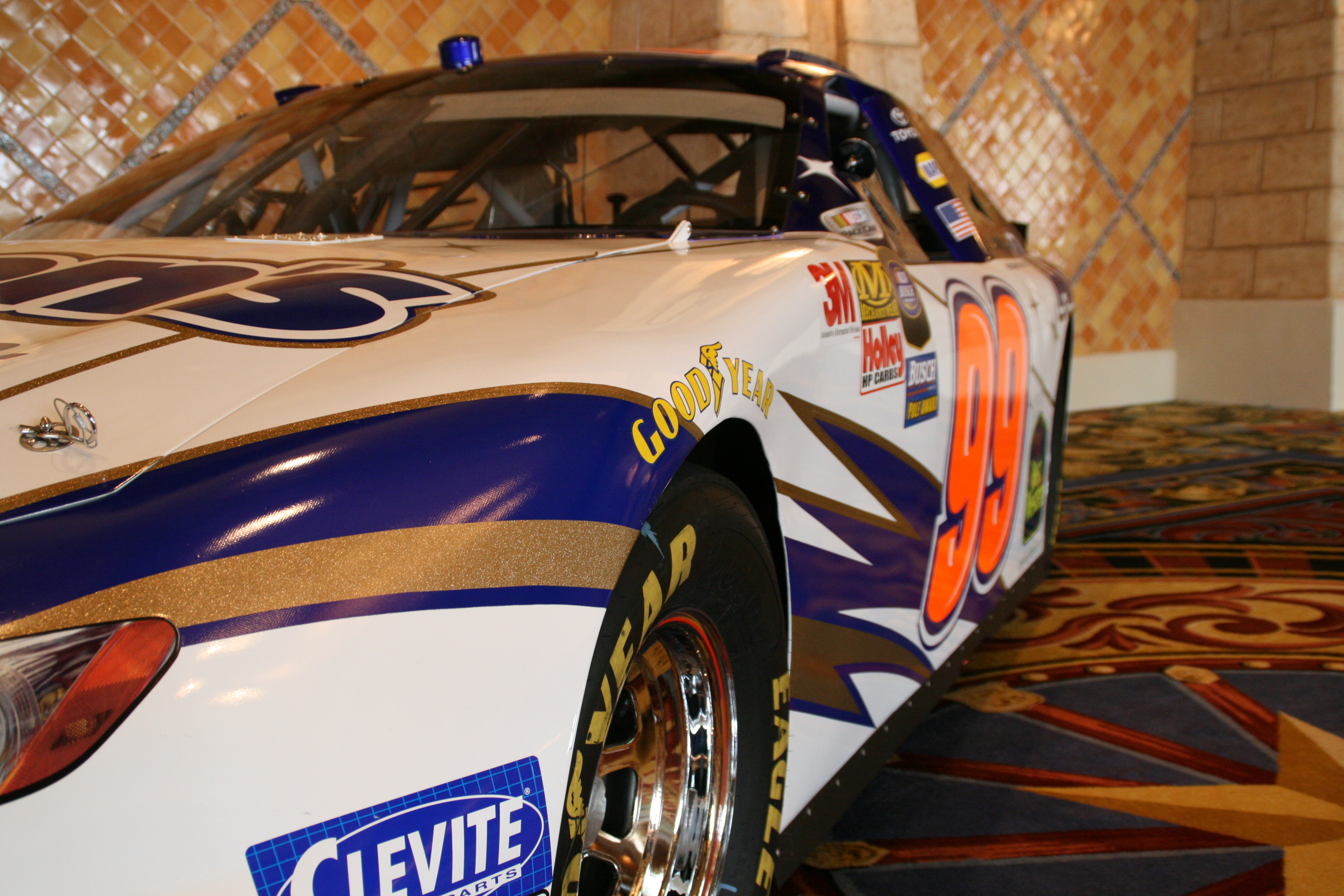
2007 Busch Series car

Reutimann moved up to the Nextel Cup Series in 2007 with Michael Waltrip Racing, and was a Raybestos Rookie of the Year Candidate.

Reutimann edged Kevin Lepage for a transfer spot during the Gatorade Duels into the Daytona 500. However, despite qualifying 14th, he was started from the rear of the field because before the Duels, NASCAR penalized Waltrip's team including Reutimann's for illegal fuel additives in all MWR cars. At the same time the No. 00 car suffered an electrical problem during a wind-down lap. Reutimann ran in the top twenty of the Daytona 500 until he was collected in an accident on lap 173; he eventually finished 40th.

The following race, at Fontana, Reutimann was involved in a vicious crash. With eight laps left in the race, Greg Biffle accidentally tapped his bumper, sending his car head-on into the outside wall. Upon impact, the car exploded in flames and slid backwards. The red flag flew, as Reutimann had instantly fallen unconscious. Paramedics came to the wreck, extinguished the flames, and helped a sore, dazed Reutimann out of his racecar. He was airlifted by a helicopter to a hospital. Reutimann suffered a minor concussion, a cracked rib and a few bruises; despite the injuries he returned to the track the next weekend in Mexico City for the Busch Series. NASCAR said that Reutimann's accident tied with several other wrecks as the hardest crash in NASCAR history. This record stood until Elliott Sadler crashed at Pocono in 2010.

The next few weeks after were not very good for Reutimann and the 00 team, failing to qualify at Las Vegas, Bristol, and Texas. However, in the races he did make, he failed to make the top 30 until the tenth race of the season at Richmond, where he finished 28th. After having engine issues at Darlington and failing to qualify for the Coca-Cola 600 and the spring Dover race, along with a disappointing run at Pocono, Reutimann finished in the top-twenty for the first time in his Cup career at Michigan, finishing fifteenth. Despite this, Reutimann was replaced for the races at Sonoma and Watkins Glen by road course ringer P. J. Jones in an attempt to get the No. 00 to the top 35 positions in owner points.

The rest of the season would end up repeating a cycle of bad finishes below thirtieth followed by a good finish above the top-twenty. After failing to qualify at Bristol, Atlanta, and Phoenix, Reutimann went on to finish the season 39th in points.

Late in the season, he won the 2007 Sam's Town 250 at Memphis Motorsports Park for his first career Busch Series win, and Toyota's second win in Busch Series competition. He finished second overall in the Busch Series' last season before becoming the Nationwide Series.

=== 2008 ===
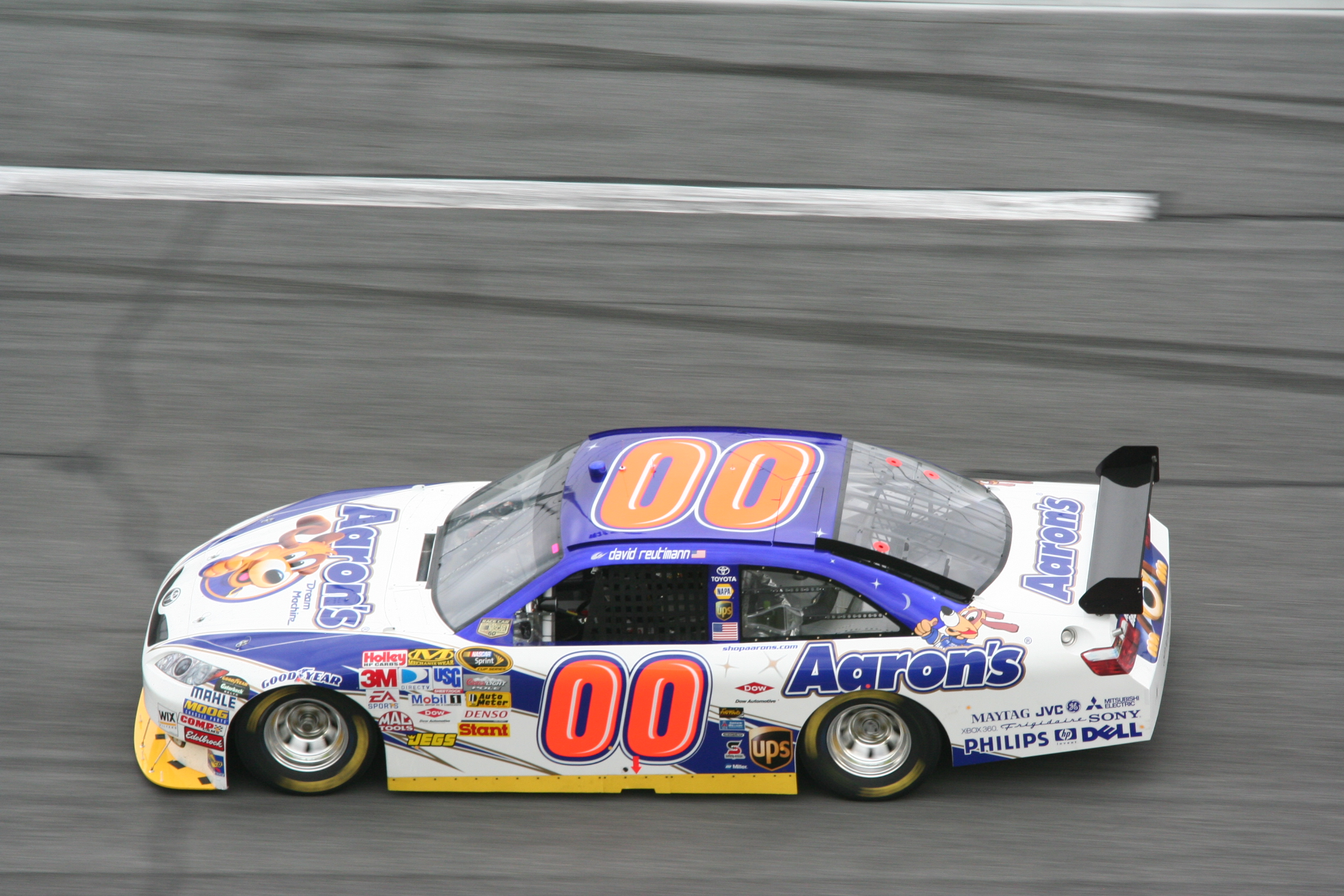
Sprint Cup car Reutimann drove first five races of 2008

In 2008, Reutimann ran the first five races of the season in the No. 00 Aaron's Dream Machine car, before taking over for the retiring Dale Jarrett in the No. 44 UPS-sponsored car and handing the No. 00 car over to rookie Michael McDowell. Starting the season out with an eighteenth place in the Daytona 500, Reutimann started to show improvement over the last season. At Fontana the following week, he finished 23rd before getting 37th at Las Vegas a week later.

In his first two races in the No. 44 car, Reutimann had mechanical issues, having a suspension issue at Martinsville and getting a blown engine the following week at Texas.

Reutimann scored his first career top-ten at Lowe's Motor Speedway during the Coca-Cola 600 with a tenth place finish. He also recorded top-tens at the Auto Club Speedway, Texas Motor Speedway, and the Richmond International Raceway. At the Richmond race in September, Reutimann led a race high 104 laps, but fell to ninth place. In the season finale at the Homestead-Miami Speedway, Reutimann claimed his first career pole position, becoming the 23rd driver to win poles in all three of NASCAR's top series.

=== 2009 ===
In 2009, Reutimann moved back to the No. 00 car. He competed a limited schedule in the Nationwide Series, splitting time with MWR's No. 99 Toyota Camry and Braun Racing's No. 10 Toyota Camry. During the Daytona 500, Reutimann finished twelfth, which would be a new career high at the race. Two weeks later at Las Vegas, Reutimann would score his first top-five, finishing fifth in the race. At Texas, Reutimann would score his first pole of the season, finishing eleventh in the race. A week later, at Phoenix, Reutimann would score his second top-ten of the season.

On May 24, he qualified well in the Coca-Cola 600 but the race was delayed due to rain. The next day on lap 222 his crew chief Rodney Childers made a call to conserve fuel which put Reutimann in the lead. A few laps later on lap 227, a rain shower soaked the track for the second time of the race, red-flagging it with Reutimann in the lead. Reutimann spent a one-hour wait praying and planning backup plans with boss Michael Waltrip and his pit crew. Despite blue skies being shown nearby the track, officials declared that the rain would last for the remainder of the night and called the race, thus giving Reutimann his first Cup series win in the Coca-Cola 600 and Waltrip giving him a full-time sponsorship until 2011.

With this emotional victory, Reutimann became the twentieth driver to win a race in all three of NASCAR's top series (Cup, Nationwide, and Truck). This race was also the fiftieth Coca-Cola 600 at Lowes Motor Speedway. He also became the first driver in Cup history to win a race without leading a lap under green. In addition, he was the first driver to ever win with the No. 00 in the NASCAR Cup Series This also entered Reutimann automatically into the 2010 NASCAR Sprint All-Star Race.

A week after his victory, Reutimann would win his second pole of the season at Dover, finishing the race in eighteenth on the lead lap. The next week at Pocono, Reutimann would end up finishing third, and would get another top-five at Loudon a couple races after. Reutimann would end up getting five more top-tens at Indianapolis, Michigan, Atlanta, Kansas, and Phoenix. Reutimann would go on to finish the season sixteenth in the point standings, a personal best.

=== 2010 ===
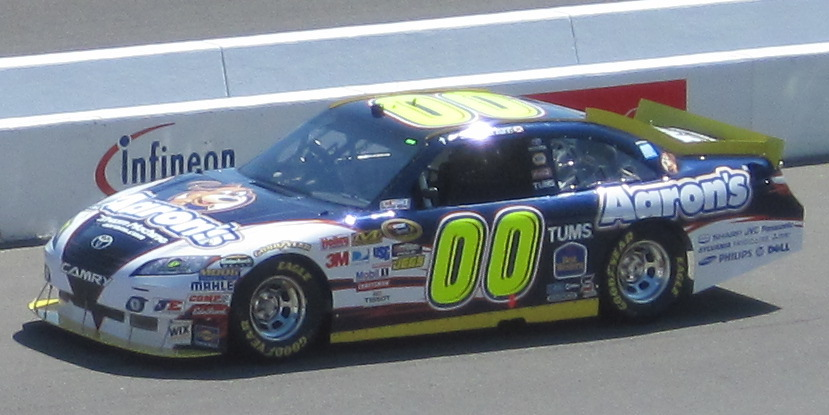
Reutimann's 2010 Sprint Cup Series car

Reutimann returned to the No. 00 car during the 2010 season. He would start the season with a personal best finish in the Daytona 500, finishing fifth. Reutimann won his second career race at the 2010 LifeLock.com 400 at Chicagoland Speedway in the No. 00 TUMS MWR Toyota. Reutimann ran in the top-five all night and with under seventy laps remaining, chased down Jeff Gordon and passed him for the lead. He would pull away and lead the rest of the race, holding off a late charge by Carl Edwards.

=== 2011 ===
2011 was a disappointing year for both Reutimann and MWR. Reutimann and the No. 00 team only scored one top-five finish and two top-ten finishes. At Watkins Glen on the final lap, Boris Said accidentally turned David Ragan entering the esses. Ragan came back onto the track and hit Reutimann, hit the ARMCO outside barrier and he rolled over spectacularly after the hard hit. He was mostly unscathed and Ragan dislocated his ankle as a result.

With three weeks remaining in the 2011 season, Reutimann could not come to an agreement with Aaron's for 2012 and thus Michael Waltrip and MWR's staff reluctantly released Reutimann from his team as well as the No. 00 car.

After Christmas 2011, Reutimann signed up to drive for part-time with Tommy Baldwin Racing in 2012 sharing the No. 10 car with rookie Danica Patrick.

=== 2012 ===
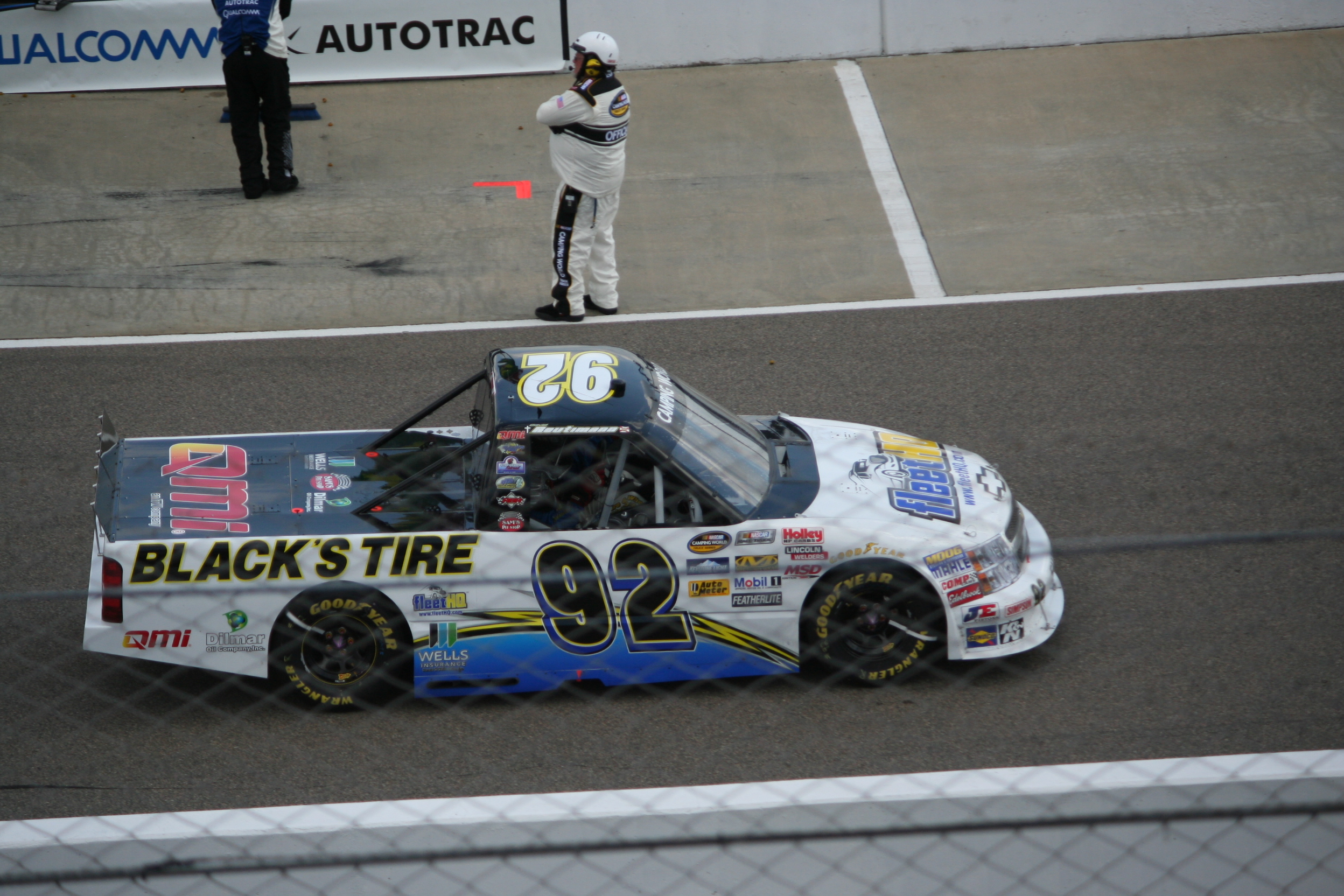
Reutimann's 2012 truck

On January 3, 2012, Reutimann signed a one-year contract to drive for Tommy Baldwin Racing. As part of an alliance with Stewart–Haas Racing that TBR agreed to on January 31, Reutimann shared the SHR No. 10 entry, which was fielded by TBR, with Danica Patrick. He also drove the No. 92 RBR Enterprises vehicle in the Camping World Truck Series on a limited schedule. As Patrick drove the No. 10 in the 2012 Daytona 500, Reutimann drove the No. 93 Toyota Camry for BK Racing in the event with Todd Anderson serving as crew chief. Reutimann also drove the BK Racing No. 93 at Darlington.

Reutimann caused a controversy at the April Martinsville race when the No. 10 Tommy Baldwin Racing Chevrolet stalled on lap 497, drawing a caution. He was accused of intentionally causing the caution after limping around the track for a few laps at speeds well below the rest of the field. The result was a broken timing belt and Reutimann was credited with a 35th place finish. He insists he was just trying to keep the car in the top-35 in owner's points; the team left Martinsville just one point outside a guaranteed start. Reutimann qualified for the next race at Texas and finished 26th, getting the No. 10 back into the top-35. During Coca-Cola 600 qualifying, David did not qualify fast enough in the No. 73 BK Racing entry and missed his first Cup race since 2007.

Reutimann drove the No. 51 Chevrolet for Phoenix Racing at the June Pocono race during the one-race suspension of Kurt Busch for actions detrimental to the sport. Baldwin explained his decision as helping another small team (Reutimann was to drive the No. 10 car that weekend). Reutimann finished 21st. Reutimann qualified and raced for a new team Xxxtreme Motorsports at the fall Phoenix race in the No. 44 No Label Watches Ford, finishing fortieth.

=== 2013 ===
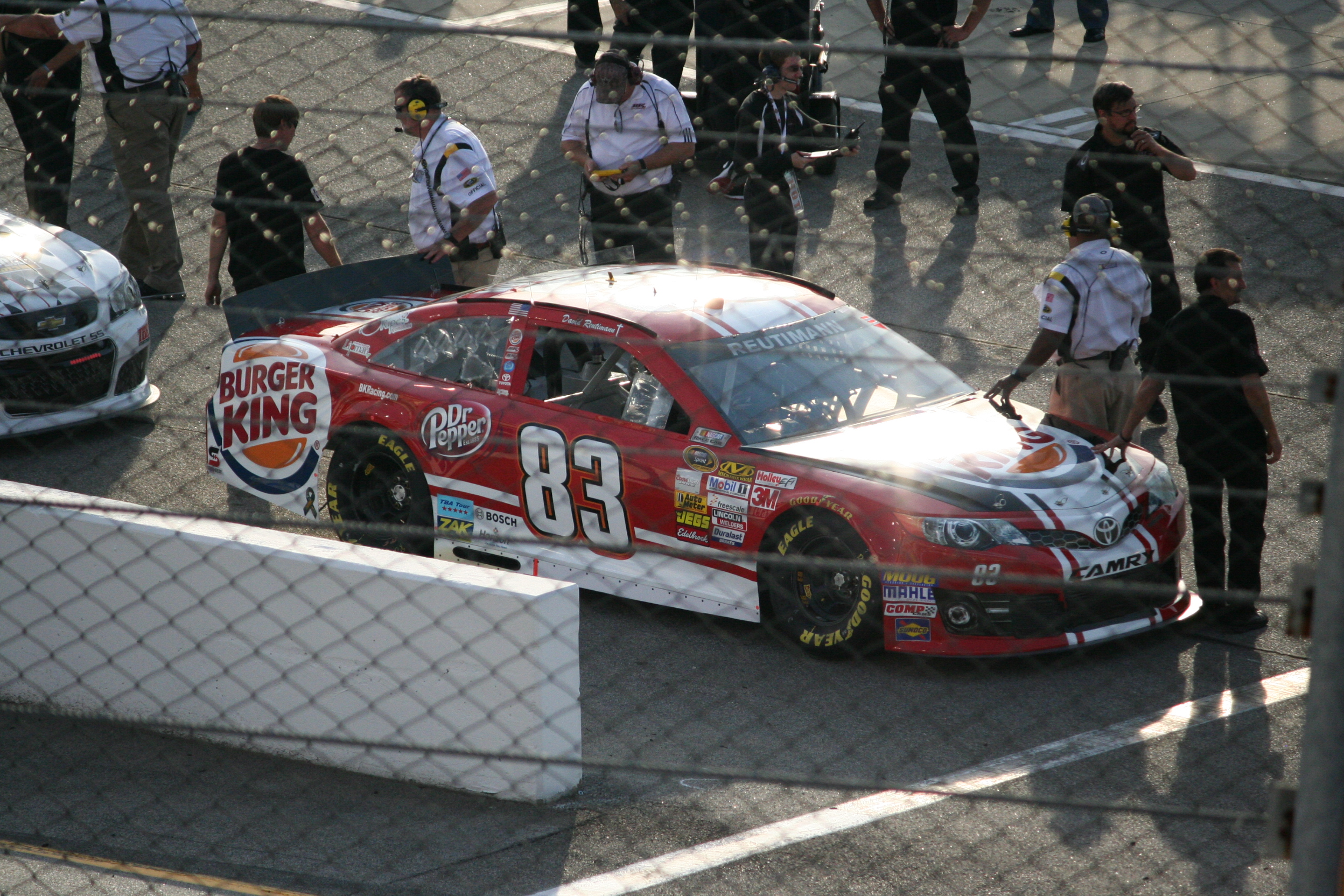
Reutimann's 2013 Cup car

On January 18, 2013, BK Racing announced that Reutimann would drive the No. 83 Toyota during the 2013 season, replacing Landon Cassill. Reutimann started the season a high note, finishing sixteenth in the Daytona 500. However the team would struggle through the season, not recording another top-twenty finish. Reutimann finished 33rd in points. Following the season, Reutimann and the team parted ways.

=== 2014 ===
Reutimann began the 2014 season without a ride in any of NASCAR's top three divisions, however in March it was announced that he would drive the Sprint Cup No. 35 Ford for Front Row Motorsports at Bristol Motor Speedway. However, he failed to qualify for the event. Reutimann made the field in three of the six Cup races he attempted. It was the last time he ran a NASCAR-sanctioned race.

== Post-NASCAR career ==
After ending his NASCAR career, Reutimann became a dirt track racing driver and chassis builder, founding Beak Built Chassis to develop UMP modified cars. In 2019, he joined Lee Faulk Racing as the crew chief for late model driver Ryan Rackley.

== Motorsports career results ==
=== NASCAR ===
(key) (Bold – Pole position awarded by qualifying time. Italics – Pole position earned by points standings or practice time. * – Most laps led.)

==== Sprint Cup Series ====
NASCAR Sprint Cup Series results
Year	Team	No.	Make	1	2	3	4	5	6	7	8	9	10	11	12	13	14	15	16	17	18	19	20	21	22	23	24	25	26	27	28	29	30	31	32	33	34	35	36	NSCC	Pts	Ref
2003	Morgan-McClure Motorsports	04	Pontiac	DAY	CAR	LVS	ATL	DAR	BRI	TEX	TAL	MAR	CAL	RCH	CLT	DOV	POC	MCH	SON	DAY	CHI	NHA; DNQ	POC	IND; DNQ	GLN	MCH	BRI	DAR	RCH	NHA	DOV	TAL	KAN	CLT	MAR	ATL	PHO	CAR	HOM	N/A	0	
2005	Michael Waltrip Racing	00	Chevy	DAY	CAL	LVS	ATL	BRI	MAR	TEX	PHO	TAL	DAR	RCH	CLT	DOV	POC	MCH	SON	DAY	CHI	NHA	POC	IND	GLN	MCH	BRI	CAL	RCH	NHA	DOV	TAL	KAN	CLT; 22	MAR	ATL	TEX	PHO	HOM	70th	97	
2007	Michael Waltrip Racing	00	Toyota	DAY; 40	CAL; 33	LVS; DNQ	ATL; 40	BRI; DNQ	MAR; 33	TEX; DNQ	PHO; 32	TAL; 32	RCH; 29	DAR; 33	CLT; DNQ	DOV; DNQ	POC; 38	MCH; 15	SON	NHA; 38	DAY; 26	CHI; 43	IND; 38	POC; 41	GLN	MCH; 23	BRI; DNQ	CAL; 32	RCH; 13	NHA; 26	DOV; 18	KAN; 31	TAL; 22	CLT; 29	MAR; 17	ATL; DNQ	TEX; 43	PHO; DNQ	HOM; 25	39th	1878	
2008	Michael Waltrip Racing	00	Toyota	DAY; 18	CAL; 23	LVS; 37	ATL; 20	BRI; 20																																22nd	3397	
2008	Michael Waltrip Racing	44	Toyota						MAR; 39	TEX; 41	PHO; 18	TAL; 20	RCH; 22	DAR; 19	CLT; 10	DOV; 27	POC; 19	MCH; 35	SON; 40	NHA; 19	DAY; 21	CHI; 14	IND; 30	POC; 30	GLN; 33	MCH; 14	BRI; 25	CAL; 9	RCH; 9*	NHA; 15	DOV; 17	KAN; 19	TAL; 37	CLT; 32	MAR; 24	ATL; 28	TEX; 10	PHO; 25	**HOM**; 20	22nd	3397	
2009	Michael Waltrip Racing	00	Toyota	DAY; 12	CAL; 14	LVS; 4	ATL; 32	BRI; 12	MAR; 20	**TEX**; 11	PHO; 8	TAL; 26	RCH; 28	DAR; 29	CLT; 1	**DOV**; 18	POC; 3	MCH; 19	SON; 31	NHA; 4	DAY; 36	CHI; 12	IND; 8	POC; 29	GLN; 25	MCH; 9	BRI; 17	ATL; 4	RCH; 20	NHA; 12	DOV; 21	KAN; 8	CAL; 18	CLT; 15	MAR; 16	TAL; 26	TEX; 16	PHO; 10	HOM; 15	16th	4221	
2010	Michael Waltrip Racing	00	Toyota	DAY; 5	CAL; 15	LVS; 13	ATL; 40	BRI; 38	MAR; 28	PHO; 20	TEX; 37	TAL; 14	RCH; 15	DAR; 11	DOV; 5	CLT; 5	POC; 15	MCH; 18	SON; 20	NHA; 15	DAY; 11	CHI; 1	IND; 28	POC; 17	GLN; 23	MCH; 16	BRI; 2	ATL; 16	RCH; 19	NHA; 7	DOV; 35	KAN; 35	CAL; 10	CLT; 9	MAR; 27	TAL; 4	TEX; 15	PHO; 26	HOM; 38	18th	4024	
2011	Michael Waltrip Racing	00	Toyota	DAY; 30	PHO; 29	LVS; 13	BRI; 30	CAL; 19	MAR; 15	TEX; 29	TAL; 14	RCH; 31	DAR; 16	DOV; 15	CLT; 9	KAN; 22	POC; 13	MCH; 35	SON; 24	DAY; 25	KEN; 2	NHA; 19	IND; 36	POC; 24	GLN; 29	MCH; 18	BRI; 36	ATL; 31	**RCH**; 26	CHI; 32	NHA; 28	DOV; 13	KAN; 35	CLT; 26	TAL; 13	MAR; 20	TEX; 22	PHO; 7	HOM; 18	28th	757	
2012	BK Racing	93	Toyota	DAY; 26										DAR; 36																										34th	373	
2012	Tommy Baldwin Racing	10	Chevy		PHO; 36	LVS; 31	BRI; 21	CAL; 27	MAR; 35	TEX; 26	KAN; 29	RCH; 33	TAL; 22			DOV; 31				KEN; 23	DAY; 11	NHA; 33	IND	POC; 24	GLN	MCH; 21	BRI	ATL	RCH; 34	CHI	NHA; 30	DOV	TAL; 37	CLT; 30	KAN	MAR; 36	TEX		HOM; 34	34th	373	
2012	BK Racing	73	Toyota												CLT; DNQ																									34th	373	
2012	Phoenix Racing	51	Chevy														POC; 21	MCH	SON																					34th	373	
2012	Xxxtreme Motorsport	44	Ford																																			PHO; 40		34th	373	
2013	BK Racing	83	Toyota	DAY; 16	PHO; 25	LVS; 34	BRI; 39	CAL; 33	MAR; 38	TEX; 24	KAN; 28	RCH; 22	TAL; 41	DAR; 36	CLT; 21	DOV; 26	POC; 32	MCH; 32	SON; 26	KEN; 27	DAY; 30	NHA; 28	IND; 29	POC; 31	GLN; 43	MCH; 37	BRI; 29	ATL; 32	RCH; 32	CHI; 36	NHA; 26	DOV; 28	KAN; 37	CLT; 26	TAL; 40	MAR; 37	TEX; 28	PHO; 39	HOM; 31	33rd	465	
2014	Front Row Motorsports	35	Ford	DAY	PHO	LVS	BRI; DNQ	CAL; 29	MAR; DNQ	TEX; 38	DAR; DNQ	RCH; 29	TAL	KAN	CLT	DOV	POC	MCH	SON	KEN	DAY	NHA	IND	POC	GLN	MCH	BRI	ATL	RCH	CHI	NHA	DOV	KAN	CLT	TAL	MAR	TEX	PHO	HOM	51st	37	

===== Daytona 500 =====
Year	Team	Manufacturer	Start	Finish
2007	Michael Waltrip Racing	Toyota	40	40
2008	Michael Waltrip Racing	Toyota	42	18
2009	Michael Waltrip Racing	Toyota	28	12
2010	Michael Waltrip Racing	Toyota	20	5
2011	Michael Waltrip Racing	Toyota	24	30
2012	BK Racing	Toyota	38	26
2013	BK Racing	Toyota	41	16

==== Nationwide Series ====
NASCAR Nationwide Series results
Year	Team	No.	Make	1	2	3	4	5	6	7	8	9	10	11	12	13	14	15	16	17	18	19	20	21	22	23	24	25	26	27	28	29	30	31	32	33	34	35	NNSC	Pts	Ref
2002	NEMCO Motorsports	87	Chevy	DAY	CAR	LVS	DAR	BRI	TEX	NSH	TAL	CAL	RCH; 16	NHA	NZH	CLT	DOV	NSH	KEN; QL^{†}	MLW	DAY	CHI	GTY	PPR	IRP	MCH	BRI	DAR	RCH	DOV	KAN	CLT	MEM; 12		CAR; 15	PHO			63rd	399	
2002	NEMCO Motorsports	88	Chevy																															ATL; DNQ			HOM; 43		63rd	399	
2003	NEMCO Motorsports	88	Chevy	DAY	CAR	LVS	DAR	BRI	TEX; 24	TAL																MCH; 6	BRI	DAR	RCH	DOV	KAN	CLT							50th	805	
2003	NEMCO Motorsports	87	Chevy								NSH; 5	CAL; 11	RCH	GTY	NZH	CLT	DOV	NSH; QL^{‡}	KEN; 37	MLW; 5	DAY	CHI; 32	NHA	PPR	IRP														50th	805	
2003	Evans Motorsports	7	Chevy																														**MEM**; QL^{±}	ATL	PHO	CAR	HOM		50th	805	
2004	NEMCO Motorsports	87	Chevy	DAY	CAR; 21	LVS	DAR	BRI	TEX	NSH; 25	TAL	CAL; 15	GTY; 30	RCH	NZH	CLT	DOV	NSH	KEN	MLW	DAY	CHI	NHA	PPR	IRP	MCH	BRI	CAL	RCH	DOV	KAN	CLT	MEM	ATL	PHO	DAR	HOM		70th	379	
2005	Darrell Waltrip Motorsports	98	Chevy	DAY	CAL	MXC	LVS	ATL	NSH	BRI	TEX	PHO	TAL	DAR	RCH	CLT	DOV	NSH	KEN	MLW	DAY	CHI	NHA	PPR	GTY	IRP	GLN	MCH	BRI	CAL	RCH	DOV	KAN	CLT	MEM	TEX	PHO	HOM; 26	118th	85	
2006	FitzBradshaw Racing	12	Dodge	DAY; 29	CAL	MXC	LVS	ATL	BRI	TEX																													34th	164	
2006	Michael Waltrip Racing	66	Dodge								NSH; 34	PHO	TAL	RCH																									34th	164	
2006	Michael Waltrip Racing	99	Dodge												DAR; 22	CLT	DOV	NSH; 6	KEN; 8	MLW; 10	DAY	CHI	NHA	MAR	GTY; 14	IRP; 36	GLN	MCH	BRI; 9	CAL; 20	RCH; 39	DOV	KAN; 13			TEX; 14	PHO	HOM; 12	34th	164	
2006	FitzBradshaw Racing	44	Dodge																															CLT; 20	MEM				34th	164	
2007	Michael Waltrip Racing	99	Toyota	DAY; 29	CAL; 14	MXC; 12	LVS; 31	ATL; 13	BRI; 33	NSH; 2	TEX; 6	PHO; 12	TAL; 24	RCH; 9	DAR; 24	CLT; 43	DOV; 15	NSH; 9	KEN; 16	MLW; 7	NHA; 8	DAY; 40	CHI; 17	GTY; 3	IRP; 3	CGV; 9	GLN; 25	MCH; 16	BRI; 3	CAL; 15	RCH; 23	DOV; 10	KAN; 17	CLT; 12	MEM; 1*	**TEX**; 18	PHO; 12	HOM; 15	2nd	4187	
2008	Michael Waltrip Racing	99	Toyota	DAY; 14	CAL; 4	LVS; 25	ATL; 10	BRI; 3	NSH; 9	TEX; 11	PHO; 9	MXC; 11	TAL; 20	RCH; 18	DAR; 3	CLT; 11	DOV; 4	NSH; 3	KEN; 13	MLW; 5	NHA; 7	DAY; 14	**CHI**; 5	GTY; 25	IRP; 26	CGV; 18	GLN; 15	MCH; 34	BRI; 8	CAL; 8	RCH; 34	DOV; 16	KAN; 17	CLT; 24	MEM; 2	TEX; 8	PHO; 31	HOM; 13	7th	4388	
2009	Braun Racing	10	Toyota	DAY; 12	CAL; 7	LVS	BRI	TEX; 9	NSH	PHO	TAL; 29	RCH	DAR	CLT	DOV	NSH	KEN	MLW	NHA	DAY	CHI; 8	GTY				MCH; 14											PHO; 18		27th	1807	
2009	Braun Racing	32	Toyota																				IRP; 11	IOW	GLN		BRI; 11	CGV	ATL	RCH; 5	DOV; 9	KAN	CAL					HOM; 6	27th	1807	
2009	Michael Waltrip Racing	99	Toyota																															CLT; 20	MEM; 8	TEX			27th	1807	
2010	Braun Racing	10	Toyota	DAY	CAL; 26	LVS	BRI	NSH	PHO	TEX; 8	TAL	RCH	DAR	DOV	CLT	NSH	KEN	ROA	NHA	DAY	CHI; 4	GTY	IRP	IOW	GLN	MCH	BRI	CGV	ATL	RCH	DOV	KAN	CAL						52nd	747	
2010	Turner Motorsports	11	Toyota																															CLT; 12	GTY	TEX; 15	PHO	HOM; 16	52nd	747	
2011	Pastrana-Waltrip Racing	99	Toyota	DAY	PHO	LVS	BRI	CAL	TEX; 9	TAL																													109th	0^{1}	
2011	Rusty Wallace Racing	64	Toyota								NSH; 14	RCH	DAR	DOV; 5	IOW	CLT	CHI	MCH; 18	ROA	DAY	KEN; 18	NHA	NSH	IRP	IOW	GLN	CGV	BRI; 20	ATL	RCH	CHI	DOV	KAN	CLT	TEX	PHO	HOM		109th	0^{1}	
2012	Mike Harmon Racing	74	Chevy	DAY	PHO	LVS	BRI; DNQ	CAL	TEX	RCH	TAL	DAR	IOW	CLT	DOV	MCH	ROA	KEN	DAY	NHA	CHI	IND	IOW	GLN	CGV	BRI	ATL	RCH	CHI	KEN	DOV	CLT	KAN	TEX	PHO	HOM			144th	0^{1}	
^{†} - Qualified for Joe Nemechek · ^{‡} - Qualified for Jeff Fuller. · ^{±} - Qualified for Greg Biffle

==== Camping World Truck Series ====
NASCAR Camping World Truck Series results
Year	Team	No.	Make	1	2	3	4	5	6	7	8	9	10	11	12	13	14	15	16	17	18	19	20	21	22	23	24	25	NCWTC	Pts	Ref
2004	Darrell Waltrip Motorsports	17	Toyota	DAY; 9	**ATL**; 3	MAR; 8	MFD; 14	CLT; 36	DOV; 17	TEX; 3	MEM; 17	MLW; 32	KAN; 29	KEN; 9	GTW; 9	MCH; 24	IRP; 17	NSH; 9	BRI; 11	RCH; 30	NHA; 5	LVS; 17	CAL; 6	TEX; 30	MAR; 27	PHO; 21	DAR; 28	**HOM**; 4	14th	2904	
2005	Darrell Waltrip Motorsports	17	Toyota	DAY; 12	CAL; 13	ATL; 24	MAR; 23	GTY; 24	MFD; 21	CLT; 17	DOV; 5	TEX; 10	MCH; 8	MLW; 23	KAN; 3	KEN; 3	MEM; 2	IRP; 11	NSH; 1	**BRI**; 29	RCH; 17	NHA; 33	LVS; 12	MAR; 34	ATL; 33	TEX; 5	PHO; 7	**HOM**; 36	13th	2979	
2006	Darrell Waltrip Motorsports	17	Toyota	DAY; 9	**CAL**; 4	ATL; 5	MAR; 15	GTY; 3	CLT; 6	MFD; 9	**DOV**; 5	TEX; 4	MCH; 15	MLW; 5	KAN; 10	KEN; 12	MEM; 7	IRP; 34	NSH; 6	BRI; 10	NHA; 12	LVS; 6	TAL; 6	MAR; 18	ATL; 4	TEX; 7	PHO; 8	HOM; 8	3rd	3530	
2008	Germain Racing	9	Toyota	DAY	CAL	ATL	MAR	KAN	CLT	MFD	DOV	TEX	MCH	MLW	MEM	KEN	IRP	NSH	BRI	GTW	NHA; 13	LVS	TAL	MAR	ATL	TEX	PHO	HOM	75th	124	
2012	RBR Enterprises	92	Chevy	DAY; DNQ	MAR; 20	CAR; 19	KAN	CLT; 18	DOV	TEX	KEN	IOW	CHI	POC	MCH	BRI	ATL	IOW	KEN	LVS	TAL	MAR	TEX	PHO	HOM				94th	0^{1}	

^{*} Season still in progress
^{1} Ineligible for series points
