= 2009 Coca-Cola 600 =

Auto race run in North Carolina in 2009

Race details
- Race 12 of 36 in the 2009 NASCAR Sprint Cup Series
- 2009 Coca-Cola 600 program cover, with artwork from Sam Bass. "Gold Rush!"
- Date: May 25, 2009
- Location: Lowe's Motor Speedway in Concord, North Carolina
- Course: Permanent racing facility
- Course length: 1.5 miles (2.4 km)
- Distance: 227 laps, 340.5 mi (547.981 km)
- Scheduled distance: 400 laps, 600 mi (965.606 km)
- Weather: Temperatures reaching up to 80.1 °F (26.7 °C); wind speeds approaching 15.9 miles per hour (25.6 km/h)

Pole position
Driver	Ryan Newman	Stewart–Haas Racing
- Time: 28.651

Most laps led
Driver	Kyle Busch	Joe Gibbs Racing
- Laps: 173

Winner
No. 00	David Reutimann	Michael Waltrip Racing

Television in the United States
- Network: Fox
- Announcers: Mike Joy, Darrell Waltrip and Larry McReynolds

Lowe's Motor Speedway, where the race was held.

The 2009 Coca-Cola 600 was the twelfth stock car race of the 2009 NASCAR Sprint Cup Series and the fiftieth iteration of the event. It was held on May 25, 2009, at Lowe's Motor Speedway in Concord, North Carolina after being postponed on May 24 because of inclement weather. Scheduled for 400 laps on the 1.5-mile (2.4 km) quad-oval, the race was won by David Reutimann of Michael Waltrip Racing after being shortened to 227 laps because of poor weather conditions. Ryan Newman finished second ahead of Robby Gordon, Carl Edwards, and Brian Vickers, who completed the first five positions.

Fox Sports televised the event in the United States, while the race was broadcast on radio by Performance Racing Network (over-the-air) and Sirius XM Radio (satellite)

The logo for the 2009 Coca-Cola 600, celebrating the 50th running of the event.

On the day of the race, 1.33 inches of precipitation were recorded around the speedway; a significant amount of rain for the Charlotte area for the month of May.

== Background ==
The Coca-Cola 600 was conceived by race car driver Curtis Turner who built the Charlotte Motor Speedway. It was first held in 1960 in an attempt by NASCAR to stage a Memorial Day weekend race to compete with the open-wheel Indianapolis 500; the two races were held together on the same day starting from 1974. The race is the longest (in terms of distance) on the NASCAR calendar and is considered by several drivers as one of the sport's most important races alongside the Daytona 500, the Brickyard 400 and the Southern 500. The event was known as the World 600 until 1984 when The Coca-Cola Company purchased the naming rights to the race and renamed it the Coca-Cola World 600 in 1985. It has been called the Coca-Cola 600 every year since 1986 except for 2002 when the name changed to Coca-Cola Racing Family 600.

== Entry list ==
No.	Driver	Make	Owner
00	David Reutimann	Toyota	Michael Waltrip
1	Martin Truex Jr	Chevrolet	Teresa Earnhardt
2	Kurt Busch	Dodge	Walter Czarnecki
5	Mark Martin	Chevrolet	Mary Hendrick
06	David Starr	Dodge	Theresa Boys
6	David Ragan	Ford	John Henry
07	Casey Mears	Chevrolet	Richard Childress
7	Robby Gordon	Toyota	Robby Gordon
09	Mike Bliss	Dodge	James Finch
9	Kasey Kahne	Dodge	George Gillett Jr
11	Denny Hamlin	Toyota	J D Gibbs
12	David Stremme	Dodge	Roger Penske
13	Max Papis	Toyota	Bob Germain
14	Tony Stewart	Chevrolet	Margaret Haas
16	Greg Biffle	Ford	Jack Roush
17	Matt Kenseth	Ford	John Henry
18	Kyle Busch	Toyota	Joe Gibbs
19	Elliott Sadler	Dodge	George Gillett Jr
20	Joey Logano	Toyota	Joe Gibbs
21	Bill Elliott	Ford	Glen Wood
24	Jeff Gordon	Chevrolet	Rick Hendrick
26	Jamie McMurray	Ford	Geoff Smith
29	Kevin Harvick	Chevrolet	Richard Childress
31	Jeff Burton	Chevrolet	Richard Childress
33	Clint Bowyer	Chevrolet	Bobby Ginn III
34	Tony Raines	Chevrolet	Teresa Earnhardt
36	Scott Riggs	Toyota	Tommy Baldwin
39	Ryan Newman	Chevrolet	Tony Stewart
41	JJ Yeley	Toyota	Jeremy Mayfield
42	Juan Pablo Montoya	Chevrolet	Teresa Earnhardt
43	Reed Sorenson	Dodge	Richard Petty
44	AJ Allmendinger	Dodge	George Gillett Jr
47	Marcos Ambrose	Toyota	Rob Kauffman
48	Jimmie Johnson	Chevrolet	Jeff Gordon
55	Michael Waltrip	Toyota	Michael Waltrip
64	Todd Bodine	Toyota	Larry Gunselman
66	Dave Blaney	Toyota	Phil Parsons
71	David Gilliland	Chevrolet	Kevin Buckler
73	Mike Garvey	Dodge	Barry Haefele
77	Sam Hornish Jr	Dodge	Bill Davis
82	Scott Speed	Toyota	Dietrich Mateschitz
83	Brian Vickers	Toyota	Dietrich Mateschitz
87	Joe Nemechek	Toyota	Andrea Nemechek
88	Dale Earnhardt Jr	Chevrolet	Rick Hendrick
96	Bobby Labonte	Ford	Jeffrey Moorad
98	Paul Menard	Ford	Max Jones
99	Carl Edwards	Ford	Jack Roush

== Qualifying ==
Pos.	No.	Driver	Make	Speed	Time	Behind
1	39	Ryan Newman	Chevrolet	188.475	28.651	0.000
2	18	Kyle Busch	Toyota	188.258	28.684	00.033
3	24	Jeff Gordon	Chevrolet	188.193	28.694	00.043
4	5	Mark Martin	Chevrolet	188.166	28.698	00.047
5	48	Jimmie Johnson	Chevrolet	187.820	28.751	00.100
6	9	Kasey Kahne	Dodge	187.493	28.801	00.150
7	09	Mike Bliss	Dodge	187.422	28.812	00.161
8	83	Brian Vickers	Toyota	187.396	28.816	00.165
9	42	Juan Pablo Montoya	Chevrolet	187.188	28.848	00.197
10	21	Bill Elliott	Ford	187.169	28.851	00.200
11	87	Joe Nemechek	Toyota	187.162	28.852	00.201
12	1	Martin Truex Jr	Chevrolet	186.916	28.890	00.239
13	11	Denny Hamlin	Toyota	186.864	28.898	00.247
14	20	Joey Logano	Toyota	186.832	28.903	00.252
15	19	Elliott Sadler	Dodge	186.825	28.904	00.253
16	16	Greg Biffle	Ford	186.735	28.918	00.267
17	2	Kurt Busch	Dodge	186.599	28.939	00.288
18	82	Scott Speed	Toyota	186.574	28.943	00.292
19	99	Carl Edwards	Ford	186.548	28.947	00.296
20	96	Bobby Labonte	Ford	186.477	28.958	00.307
21	00	David Reutimann	Toyota	186.368	28.975	00.324
22	29	Kevin Harvick	Chevrolet	186.233	28.996	00.345
23	47	Marcos Ambrose	Toyota	186.220	28.998	00.347
24	33	Clint Bowyer	Chevrolet	186.181	29.004	00.353
25	66	Dave Blaney	Toyota	186.014	29.030	00.379
26	77	Sam Hornish Jr	Dodge	185.970	29.037	00.386
27	88	Dale Earnhardt Jr	Chevrolet	185.829	29.059	00.408
28	14	Tony Stewart	Chevrolet	185.778	29.067	00.416
29	71	David Gilliland	Chevrolet	185.707	29.078	00.427
30	17	Matt Kenseth	Ford	185.605	29.094	00.443
31	98	Paul Menard	Ford	185.592	29.096	00.445
32	13	Max Papis	Toyota	185.433	29.121	00.470
33	26	Jamie McMurray	Ford	185.319	29.139	00.488
34	6	David Ragan	Ford	185.173	29.162	00.511
35	12	David Stremme	Dodge	185.096	29.174	00.523
36	07	Casey Mears	Chevrolet	184.704	29.236	00.585
37	7	Robby Gordon	Toyota	184.590	29.254	00.603
38	44	AJ Allmendinger	Dodge	184.338	29.294	00.643
39	55	Michael Waltrip	Toyota	183.949	29.356	00.705
40	31	Jeff Burton	Chevrolet	183.281	29.463	00.812
41	34	Tony Raines	Chevrolet	183.175	29.480	00.829
42	43	Reed Sorenson	Dodge	183.156	29.483	00.832
43	36	Scott Riggs	Toyota	184.432	29.279	00.628
Failed to qualify
44	41	J.J. Yeley	Toyota	184.093	29.333	
45	73	Mike Garvey	Dodge	182.457	29.596	
46	64	Todd Bodine	Toyota	182.426	29.601	
47	06	David Starr	Dodge	179.081	30.154	

== Race recap ==
Ryan Newman and Kyle Busch started on the front row followed by Jeff Gordon and Mark Martin in the second one, and Jimmie Johnson and Kasey Kahne in the third. Newman decided to start the race from the outside, switching positions with Busch.

At 12:12 pm EDT, the green flag waved marking the start of the 50th running of the Coca-Cola 600. After lap 1, Newman led the first lap with Busch in 2nd and Martin in 3rd. Two laps later, Busch took the lead from Newman while out of turn 4. On lap 7, the first caution flag was waved for light rain. Before the caution, Brian Vickers was in 5th after starting in 8th and Denny Hamlin was in that position after starting 13th. Dale Earnhardt Jr., starting in 27th, was in 31st. Eleven drivers entered pit road. Among them were Earnhardt Jr.; Kevin Harvick; Michael Waltrip; Greg Biffle; and Matt Kenseth.

When the restarted on lap 12, Busch had the lead followed by Newman, Martin, Kahne, and Vickers behind him. Shortly after, Harvick and Sam Hornish Jr. made contact on the backstretch. On lap 17, Harvick made contact with the outside wall entering turn 1, causing damage to his car and bringing out a caution. Busch reported an electrical problem with his car.

On lap 19, the race restarted with Busch, Newman, Martin, Kahne, and Gordon in the Top 5. By lap 35, Busch had opened a 2-second lead over Martin, who was 2nd. Tony Stewart, starting in 28th, was now in 15th. During pit stops on lap 42 after a competition caution, Johnson had the lead off pit road and gained 16 positions, followed by Busch and Martin. Newman had to come back to pit road for a lugnut replacement and Mike Bliss drove his car to the garage.

The race restarted on lap 45 with Johnson, Busch, Martin, Kurt Busch, and Denny Hamlin rounding out the Top 5. On lap 51, Ky. Busch took the lead away from Johnson with Martin still in 2nd. By lap 55, Johnson, with a loose car, had fallen to the 6th place. Rain returned by lap 71, resulting in yet another caution. After pit stops that followed, Carl Edwards gained 10 positions, Jamie McMurray gained 16, Reutimann gained 7, and Martin Truex Jr. gained 13. Vickers lost 6. Martin's crew lost a tire from their pit, resulting in a penalty for him. Robby Gordon stayed out and led a lap. Waltrip and Scott Riggs also stayed out. Approximately 55 minutes after the start of the race, the red flag was waved on lap 74 for rain. R. Gordon, Waltrip, Riggs, KY. Busch, Edwards, Reutimann, McMurray, Joey Logano, Kahne, and Juan Pablo Montoya made up the Top 10 at that time.

This red flag period lasted 54 minutes before caution laps resumed. R. Gordon, Waltrip, and Riggs made pit stops under the caution. Each of the three had a led at least a lap. The restart on lap 79 with Ky. Busch, Edwards, Reutimann, McMurray, and Logano in the Top 5. Martin served a penalty from the last pit stop and dropped to 37th place. By lap 87, Ky. Busch opened a two-second lead over second place Reutimann. On lap 93, McMurray dropped from fourth to 10th and Reutimann fell two spots from 2nd after making contact with the outside wall of Turn 4. Meanwhile, Earnhardt Jr. continued to fight an ill-handling car and on lap 111 Ky. Busch, who was leading, put him a lap down. On lap 120, Vickers took the lead from Ky. Busch. As of lap 122, Joe Nemechek, Waltrip, Harvick, and Max Papis, running 38th through 41st respectively, were a lap down. Green flag pit stops began at that point. On lap 129, Montoya took second from KY. Busch. Logano led lap 131. Reutimann and David Gilliland were deemed too fast on pit road and served penalties. Meanwhile, Dave Blaney led two laps under green flag pit stops. Blaney's stop on lap 134 ended the cycle and Ky. Busch regained the lead, followed by Vickers, Montoya, Kahne, and Johnson. Vickers took the lead on lap 146, and by lap 161, he had opened a 2.2-second lead over Montoya.

=== Historic moment of silence ===
On lap 163, race officials threw the red flag, and ordered the cars to shut down the engines on the front stretch for a moment of silence in honor of those who died in the service of America's military. This moment took place at 3:00 pm EDT; the time was chosen because it coincides with that traditionally set aside by American tradition on Memorial Day. Members of pit crews and fans stood in observance, while drivers quietly reflected in their cars. Although this moment was not originally planned — and indeed would not have occurred if the race had not been postponed the day before — it reportedly met with praise from drivers, crews and fans.

=== Pit stops and resumption of race ===
During the pit stops, Edwards gained six spots, Jeff Gordon gained twelve spots, Montoya lost three positions, and Vickers lost nine spots. The rain came and delayed the waving of the green flag. On lap 177, the red flag was waved for rain for the second time in the race three hours and eight minutes since the start. Kyle Busch, Kahne, Johnson, Edwards, Montoya, Logano, Kenseth, Jeff Gordon, Hamlin, and Vickers are in the top ten when the red flag waved.

The field restarted on lap 180 at 3:42 pm. EDT. Twenty-six cars were on the lead lap as they took the green flag. On lap 182, Logano took fifth from Montoya and Johnson took second from Kahne. Seven laps later, Montoya, running in 7th, reported his car has tightened up. Kurt Busch, running in 15th, entered pit road for a two-tire change on lap 193 because of vibrations. Kurt Busch re-entered the race in 38th, one lap down. On lap 208, seven laps after halfway, Kyle Busch had a 2.4-second lead over Kasey Kahne. Kyle's brother, Kurt, advanced four spots from 38th since the pitstop for vibrations. On lap 213, Kenseth, running in 7th, reported his car has tightened up.

Eight laps later, rain hit the track again and forced another yellow flag for rain. On the ensuing stops, Edwards gained two spots, Vickers five spots, and Labonte seven spots. Johnson lost four spots. Reutimann, Newman, and Robby Gordon stayed on the track.

On lap 227, the third red flag of the race was waved with Reutimann, Newman, Robby Gordon, Edwards, Vickers, Kyle Busch, Kahne, Montoya, Logano, and Kenseth in the top ten. Hours later the race was called official giving Reutimann his first Cup series win in 76 starts. Newman, the polesitter, finished in second in his Stewart–Haas Racing Chevrolet. Robby Gordon finished third, his first top 5 finish since the 2007 Watkins Glen race Carl Edwards had the highest finishing Ford in fourth place. Kyle Busch had led the most laps (173), finished sixth. Kasey Kahne, the defending winner, had the highest finishing Dodge in seventh. Rookie Joey Logano finished ninth. Bill Elliott, in his 800 career start, finished 15th. Marcos Ambrose, the last driver on the lead lap, came in 26th.

=== Firsts ===
David Reutimann won his first race in the Sprint Cup Series. It was also the first win for Michael Waltrip Racing in the Sprint Cup Series and the first for Michael Waltrip as an owner. This was the first win for a car with the number 00 in Sprint Cup history and the first win for Toyota at Lowe's Motor Speedway in the Cup series. Also, due to the rainout, this marked the first time the actual race was held on Memorial Day. Also, this was the first Sprint Cup race at Charlotte to be held during the day since 2001.

== Results ==
Finish	No.	Driver	Make	Team	Laps	Led	Status	Pts	Winnings
1	00	David Reutimann	Toyota	Michael Waltrip Racing	227	5	running	190	403998
2	39	Ryan Newman	Chevy	Stewart–Haas Racing	227	2	running	175	326754
3	7	Robby Gordon	Toyota	Robby Gordon Motorsports	227	1	running	120	208985
4	99	Carl Edwards	Ford	Roush Fenway Racing	227	0	running	160	207531
5	83	Brian Vickers	Toyota	Red Bull Racing Team	227	33	running	160	177898
6	18	Kyle Busch	Toyota	Joe Gibbs Racing	227	173	running	160	200198
7	9	Kasey Kahne	Dodge	Richard Petty Motorsports	227	0	running	146	159998
8	42	Juan Pablo Montoya	Chevy	Earnhardt Ganassi Racing	227	0	running	142	151773
9	20	Joey Logano	Toyota	Joe Gibbs Racing	227	1	running	143	163351
10	17	Matt Kenseth	Ford	Roush Fenway Racing	227	0	running	134	160965
11	11	Denny Hamlin	Toyota	Joe Gibbs Racing	227	0	running	130	122655
12	96	Bobby Labonte	Ford	Hall of Fame Racing	227	0	running	127	135829
13	48	Jimmie Johnson	Chevy	Hendrick Motorsports	227	6	running	129	158751
14	24	Jeff Gordon	Chevy	Hendrick Motorsports	227	0	running	121	145951
15	21	Bill Elliott	Ford	Wood Brothers Racing	227	0	running	118	106000
16	77	Sam Hornish Jr.	Dodge	Penske Racing	227	0	running	115	121610
17	5	Mark Martin	Chevy	Hendrick Motorsports	227	0	running	112	111785
18	82	Scott Speed	Toyota	Red Bull Racing Team	227	0	running	109	116648
19	14	Tony Stewart	Chevy	Stewart–Haas Racing	227	0	running	106	109973
20	16	Greg Biffle	Ford	Roush Fenway Racing	227	0	running	103	116175
21	26	Jamie McMurray	Ford	Roush Fenway Racing	227	0	running	100	105050
22	12	David Stremme	Dodge	Penske Racing	227	0	running	97	128615
23	1	Martin Truex Jr.	Chevy	Earnhardt Ganassi Racing	227	0	running	94	131140
24	6	David Ragan	Ford	Roush Fenway Racing	227	0	running	91	102325
25	31	Jeff Burton	Chevy	Richard Childress Racing	227	0	running	88	137731
26	47	Marcos Ambrose	Toyota	JTG Daugherty Racing	227	0	running	85	104898
27	71	David Gilliland	Chevy	TRG Motorsports	226	0	running	82	89200
28	66	Dave Blaney	Toyota	Prism Motorsports	226	2	running	84	91175
29	98	Paul Menard	Ford	Yates Racing	226	0	running	76	121956
30	55	Michael Waltrip	Toyota	Michael Waltrip Racing	226	1	running	78	99925
31	19	Elliott Sadler	Dodge	Richard Petty Motorsports	226	0	running	70	98775
32	44	A.J. Allmendinger	Dodge	Richard Petty Motorsports	226	0	running	67	88150
33	07	Casey Mears	Chevy	Richard Childress Racing	226	0	running	64	106975
34	2	Kurt Busch	Dodge	Penske Racing	226	0	running	61	106900
35	43	Reed Sorenson	Dodge	Richard Petty Motorsports	226	0	running	58	125101
36	33	Clint Bowyer	Chevy	Richard Childress Racing	226	0	running	55	95625
37	87	Joe Nemechek	Toyota	NEMCO Motorsports	226	0	running	52	87400
38	36	Scott Riggs	Toyota	Tommy Baldwin Racing	225	3	running	54	87285
39	34	Tony Raines	Chevy	Front Row Motorsports	225	0	running	46	95175
40	88	Dale Earnhardt Jr.	Chevy	Hendrick Motorsports	225	0	running	43	105065
41	29	Kevin Harvick	Chevy	Richard Childress Racing	224	0	running	40	124283
42	13	Max Papis	Toyota	Germain Racing	219	0	running	37	86850
43	09	Mike Bliss	Dodge	Phoenix Racing	42	0	vibration	34	87817

Previous race: 2009 Southern 500 presented by GoDaddy.com	Sprint Cup Series; 2009 season	Next race: 2009 Autism Speaks 400
