= 2010 LifeLock.com 400 =

Race 19 of 2010 NASCAR Sprint Cup series

Race details
- Race 19 of 36 in the 2010 NASCAR Sprint Cup Series
- Date: July 10, 2010
- Location: Chicagoland Speedway Joliet, Illinois
- Course: Permanent racing facility
- Course length: 1.500 miles (2.414 km)
- Distance: 267 laps, 400.5 mi (644.5 km)
- Weather: Sunny with a high around 84; wind out of the NNE at 8 mph.
- Average speed: 145.138 miles per hour (233.577 km/h)

Pole position
| Driver | Jamie McMurray | Earnhardt Ganassi Racing |
- Time: 29.421

Most laps led
| Driver | Jimmie Johnson | Hendrick Motorsports |
- Laps: 92

Winner
| No. 00 | David Reutimann | Michael Waltrip Racing |

Television in the United States
- Network: Turner Network Television
- Announcers: Adam Alexander, Wally Dallenbach Jr. and Kyle Petty

The 2010 LifeLock.com 400 was a NASCAR Sprint Cup Series race that was held on July 10, 2010, at Chicagoland Speedway in Joliet, Illinois. It was the nineteenth race of the 2010 NASCAR Sprint Cup Series season. The event began at 7:30 p.m. Local Time on TNT. It was broadcast on the radio station Motor Racing Network at 6:30 p.m. EDT.

Contested over 267 laps, the race had a total of four cautions and ten lead changes among seven different drivers. David Reutimann clinched his first and only cup victory of the season (along with his second and final career NASCAR Cup Series win) driving for Michael Waltrip Racing after starting seventh. Carl Edwards finished second and Jeff Gordon finished third.

== Race report ==
=== Background ===
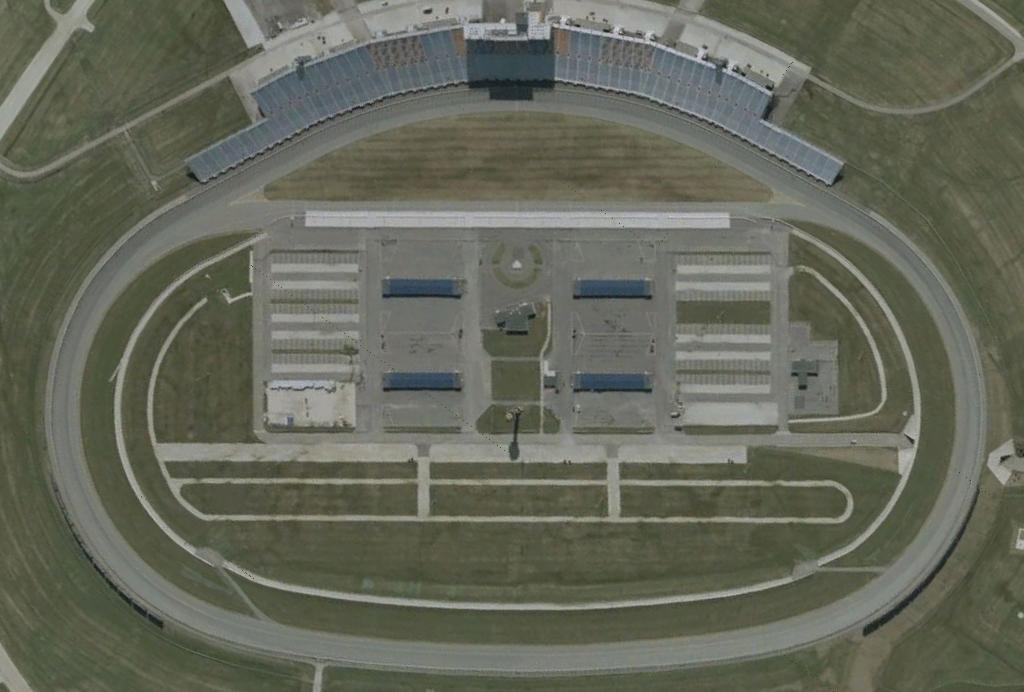
Chicagoland Speedway, the track where the race was held.

Chicagoland Speedway is one of ten intermediate tracks to hold NASCAR races. The standard track at Chicagoland Speedway is a four-turn tri-oval track that is 1.5 miles (2.4 km) long. The track's turns are each banked at 18 degrees and have a turn width of 55 feet. The racetrack has a grandstand capacity of 75,000.

Prior to the race, Kevin Harvick of Richard Childress Racing led the Drivers' Championship with 2,684 points, 212 points ahead of Jeff Gordon in second. Behind them, Jimmie Johnson was third with 2,459 points, and Kurt Busch was fourth with 2,439 points, Denny Hamlin was fifth with 2,400 points. Kyle Busch, Matt Kenseth, Jeff Burton, Tony Stewart and Greg Biffle rounded out the top ten in the Championship. In the Manufacturers' Championship, Chevrolet was leading with 130 points, twenty points ahead of their rival Toyota. In the battle for third place, Dodge and Ford were tied with 78 points each.

=== Practice and qualifying ===
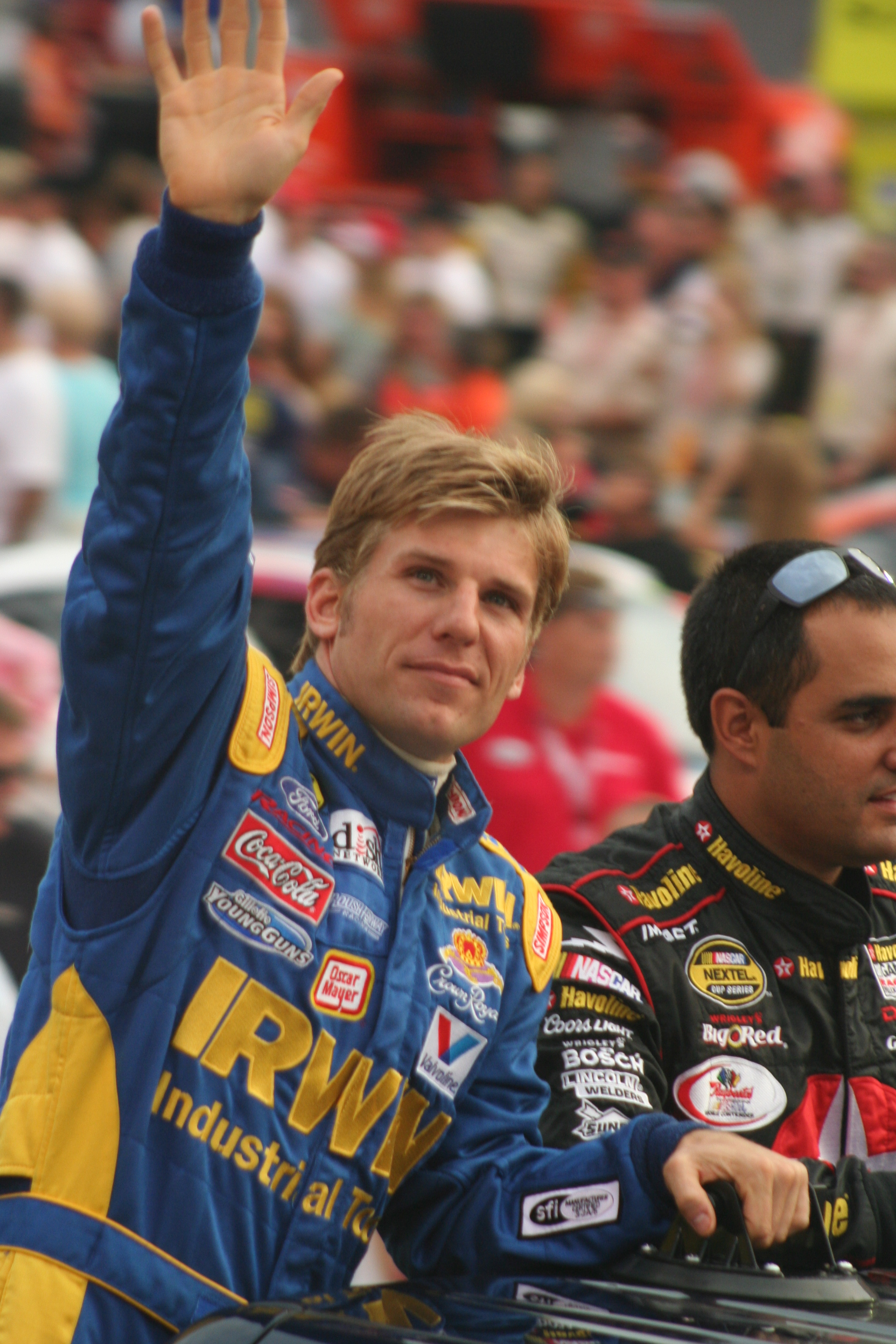
Jamie McMurray won the pole position with a time of 29.421.

Two practice sessions were held before the Saturday race—both on Friday. The first session lasted 105 minutes, and the evening session completed after 45 minutes. In the first practice session, Joe Nemechek was the quickest, ahead of the Chevrolet of Casey Mears and the Ford of David Stremme in second and third. Jeff Gordon and Jimmie Johnson followed in fourth and fifth. In the second practice session, Juan Pablo Montoya was quickest, while Jamie McMurray and Greg Biffle followed in second and third. Johnson and Carl Edwards rounded out the top five.

During qualifying, forty-seven drivers were entered, but only the fastest forty-three raced because of NASCAR's qualifying procedure. McMurray clinched his sixth pole position, with a time of 29.421. He was joined on the front row of the grid by Johnson. Tony Stewart managed to qualify third, and Biffle qualified fourth. Sam Hornish Jr. qualified fifth and Gordon, David Reutimann, Paul Menard, Martin Truex Jr. and Montoya rounded off the top ten. The four drivers that failed to qualify for the race were J. J. Yeley, Dave Blaney, Michael McDowell, and Todd Bodine.

=== Race ===
The race, the nineteenth out of a total of thirty-six in the season, began at 7:30 p.m. EDT and was televised live in the United States on TNT. Conditions were sunny with a high 88 °F (31 °C), but there was a fifty percent chance of scattered thunderstorms in the area which could make the track potentially slippery later in the race. Co-director of Raceway Windy City Ministries Glenn Spoolstra began the pre-race ceremonies by giving the invocation. Afterward, Jim Cornelison, the Chicago Blackhawks national anthem singer, performed the United States National Anthem while Duncan Keith gave the command to start engines.

Jamie McMurray maintained the first position going through turns one and two, but Johnson, who had started second passed McMurray to lead the first lap. Two laps later, David Reutimann moved into sixth, after passing Sam Hornish Jr. After three laps, McMurray fell to fourth because of car handling problems. On lap 7, Tony Stewart passed Greg Biffle for the second position. Hornish Jr., who started fifth, had fallen seven positions to twelfth by lap 11. Carl Edwards, after starting eleventh, moved into eighth on lap 15. By lap 20, Johnson had a one-second lead over Stewart in second. Seven laps later, McMurray moved into third by passing Biffle.

On lap 39, the first caution was brought out because David Stremme collided with the wall. Afterward, teams made their first pit stop. Johnson remained the leader, as Martin Truex Jr. moved to second for the restart. One lap later, McMurray moved into the second position. On lap 48, Jeff Gordon moved into the seventh position, after passing Juan Pablo Montoya and A. J. Allmendinger. On lap 60, Johnson had led more laps at the beginning of this race than any other in the season. Eight laps later, Truex Jr. and his teammate Reutimann were in the third and fourth positions. On lap 70, Stewart moved into the eight position, as Biffle moved into the top-ten. After seventy-two laps, Kyle Busch, who began in the thirty-third position, had moved to twenty-fifth. On lap 80, Montoya moved into seventh, by passing Biffle. By lap 88, five cars had gone to the garage area of the track, they were Landon Cassill, Casey Mears, Mike Bliss, Max Papis and Joe Nemechek.

Two laps later, Johnson had a two-second lead over McMurray, as pit stops began. On lap 96, McMurray became the leader as Johnson came to pit road. After missing pit lane the first time, Johnson was scored in the third position two laps later. On lap 108, Johnson passed Truex Jr. for second, but he was still scored 1.1 seconds behind McMurray. Eight laps later, Reutimann passed Truex Jr. for the third position. Afterward on lap 120, Martin Truex Jr. continued to lose positions, as he fell to fourth after being passed by Jeff Gordon. Nine laps later, the second caution came out because of debris. The green flag waved for the restart on lap 136, with McMurray and Johnson in first and second. One lap later, Johnson got loose and spun sideways through the grass to bring out the third caution, but he retained no major damage. Johnson fell to the twenty-fourth position after having to make a pit stop under this caution.

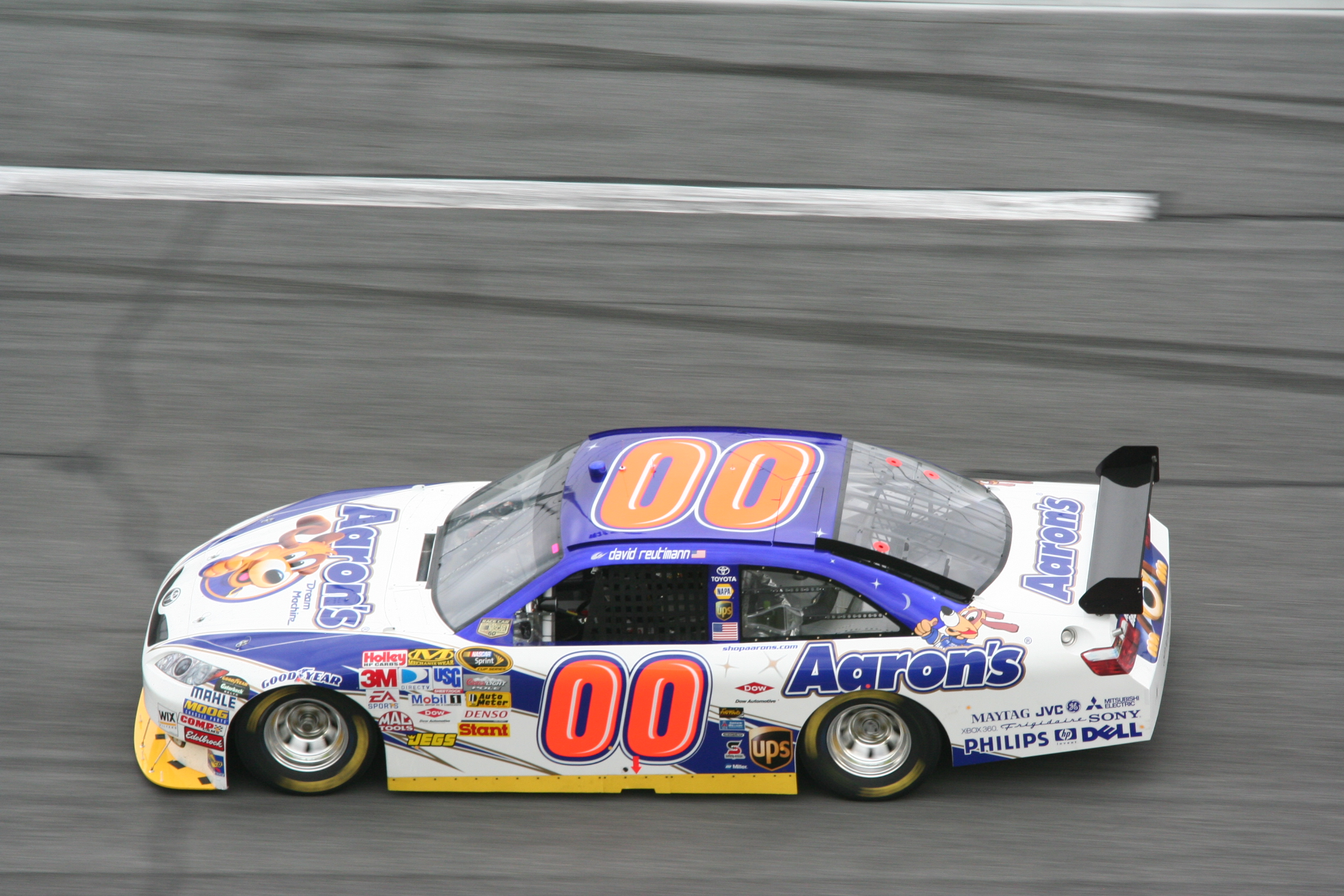
David Reutimann clinched his second career victory after the race.

On lap 140, McMurray restarted in the first position. Four laps later, Reutimann moved forward one position into third, after passing Truex Jr. Afterward, on lap 147, Truex Jr. lost two positions after being passed by Clint Bowyer and Jeff Burton. On lap 166, McMurray was passed by Gordon for the lead . Three laps later, Reutimann passed McMurray for the second position. On lap 174, Johnson came to pit lane after colliding with the wall. Four laps later, Stewart claimed the eighth position after passing Truex Jr. On lap 180, the fourth caution came out because Bill Elliott collided with the wall, as Robby Gordon careened into Elliott. Nine laps later, the green flag waved as Gordon led. On lap 192, Biffle began losing positions because of an engine failure.

Two laps later, Kevin Harvick drove his race car to the garage area. On lap 197, it was said that Harvick's crew members were changing a fuel pump. On lap 212, Edwards passed McMurray for fourth. One lap later, Reutimann passed Gordon for the lead. Fifteen laps later, Biffle's engine failed. One lap later, Johnson made a scheduled green flag pit stop. On lap 233 Bowyer claimed the lead as Reutimann came to pit lane for a stop. Afterward, Edwards and Montoya led as green flag pit stops continued. Green flag pit stops finished on lap 236, after Reutimann reclaimed the lead. On lap 242 Edwards claimed the second position from Gordon. Reutimann remained the leader, and crossed the finish line first to clinch his second career victory in the Sprint Cup Series. Edwards finished second ahead of Gordon, Bowyer and McMurray.

== Classification ==
=== Qualifying ===
| Grid | No. | Driver | Team | Manufacturer | Time (in seconds) |
|---|---|---|---|---|---|
| 1 | 1 | Jamie McMurray | Earnhardt Ganassi Racing | Chevrolet | 29.421 |
| 2 | 48 | Jimmie Johnson | Hendrick Motorsports | Chevrolet | 29.463 |
| 3 | 14 | Tony Stewart | Stewart Haas Racing | Chevrolet | 29.528 |
| 4 | 16 | Greg Biffle | Roush Fenway Racing | Ford | 29.561 |
| 5 | 77 | Sam Hornish Jr. | Penske Racing | Dodge | 29.572 |
| 6 | 24 | Jeff Gordon | Hendrick Motorsports | Chevrolet | 29.573 |
| 7 | 00 | David Reutimann | Michael Waltrip Racing | Toyota | 29.575 |
| 8 | 98 | Paul Menard | Richard Petty Motorsports | Ford | 29.598 |
| 9 | 56 | Martin Truex Jr. | Michael Waltrip Racing | Toyota | 29.598 |
| 10 | 42 | Juan Pablo Montoya | Earnhardt Ganassi Racing | Chevrolet | 29.630 |
| 11 | 99 | Carl Edwards | Roush Fenway Racing | Ford | 29.643 |
| 12 | 9 | Kasey Kahne | Richard Petty Motorsports | Ford | 29.653 |
| 13 | 43 | A. J. Allmendinger | Richard Petty Motorsports | Ford | 29.664 |
| 14 | 31 | Jeff Burton | Richard Childress Racing | Chevrolet | 29.674 |
| 15 | 33 | Clint Bowyer | Richard Childress Racing | Chevrolet | 29.692 |
| 16 | 19 | Elliott Sadler | Richard Petty Motorsports | Ford | 29.702 |
| 17 | 11 | Denny Hamlin | Joe Gibbs Racing | Toyota | 29.703 |
| 18 | 20 | Joey Logano | Joe Gibbs Racing | Toyota | 29.727 |
| 19 | 39 | Ryan Newman | Stewart Haas Racing | Chevrolet | 29.733 |
| 20 | 09 | Bobby Labonte | Phoenix Racing | Chevrolet | 29.743 |
| 21 | 5 | Mark Martin | Hendrick Motorsports | Chevrolet | 29.766 |
| 22 | 2 | Kurt Busch | Penske Racing | Dodge | 29.777 |
| 23 | 47 | Marcos Ambrose | JTG Daugherty Racing | Toyota | 29.781 |
| 24 | 83 | Reed Sorenson | Red Bull Racing Team | Toyota | 29.783 |
| 25 | 88 | Dale Earnhardt Jr. | Hendrick Motorsports | Chevrolet | 29.785 |
| 26 | 6 | David Ragan | Roush Fenway Racing | Ford | 29.818 |
| 27 | 29 | Kevin Harvick | Richard Childress Racing | Chevrolet | 29.823 |
| 28 | 87 | Joe Nemechek | NEMCO Motorsports | Toyota | 29.846 |
| 29 | 21 | Bill Elliott | Wood Brothers Racing | Ford | 29.868 |
| 30 | 12 | Brad Keselowski | Penske Racing | Dodge | 29.936 |
| 31 | 13 | Max Papis | Germain Racing | Toyota | 29.945 |
| 32 | 71 | Landon Cassill | TRG Motorsports | Chevrolet | 29.955 |
| 33 | 18 | Kyle Busch | Joe Gibbs Racing | Toyota | 29.968 |
| 34 | 17 | Matt Kenseth | Roush Fenway Racing | Ford | 29.975 |
| 35 | 36 | Casey Mears | Tommy Baldwin Racing | Chevrolet | 29.983 |
| 36 | 26 | David Stremme | Latitude 43 Motorsports | Ford | 30.011 |
| 37 | 32 | Mike Bliss | Braun Racing | Toyota | 30.052 |
| 38 | 7 | Robby Gordon | Robby Gordon Motorsports | Toyota | 30.098 |
| 39 | 82 | Scott Speed | Red Bull Racing Team | Toyota | 30.101 |
| 40 | 37 | David Gilliland | Front Row Motorsports | Ford | 30.218 |
| 41 | 78 | Regan Smith | Furniture Row Racing | Chevrolet | 30.263 |
| 42 | 34 | Kevin Conway | Front Row Motorsports | Ford | 30.529 |
| 43 | 38 | Travis Kvapil | Front Row Motorsports | Ford | 30.110 |
Did not qualify
| | 55 | Michael McDowell | Prism Motorsports | Toyota | 30.151 |
| | 66 | Dave Blaney | Prism Motorsports | Toyota | 30.193 |
| | 46 | J. J. Yeley | Whitney Motorsports | Dodge | 30.338 |
| | 64 | Todd Bodine | Gunselman Motorsports | Toyota | 30.448 |

=== Race results ===
| Pos | Grid | Car | Driver | Team | Manufacturer | Laps | Points |
|---|---|---|---|---|---|---|---|
| 1 | 7 | 00 | David Reutimann | Michael Waltrip Racing | Toyota | 267 | 190 |
| 2 | 11 | 99 | Carl Edwards | Roush Fenway Racing | Ford | 267 | 175 |
| 3 | 6 | 24 | Jeff Gordon | Hendrick Motorsports | Chevrolet | 267 | 170 |
| 4 | 15 | 33 | Clint Bowyer | Richard Childress Racing | Chevrolet | 267 | 165 |
| 5 | 1 | 1 | Jamie McMurray | Earnhardt Ganassi Racing | Chevrolet | 267 | 160 |
| 6 | 12 | 9 | Kasey Kahne | Richard Petty Motorsports | Ford | 267 | 150 |
| 7 | 14 | 31 | Jeff Burton | Richard Childress Racing | Chevrolet | 267 | 146 |
| 8 | 17 | 11 | Denny Hamlin | Joe Gibbs Racing | Toyota | 267 | 142 |
| 9 | 3 | 14 | Tony Stewart | Stewart Haas Racing | Chevrolet | 267 | 138 |
| 10 | 9 | 98 | Paul Menard | Richard Petty Motorsports | Ford | 267 | 134 |
| 11 | 8 | 56 | Martin Truex Jr. | Michael Waltrip Racing | Toyota | 267 | 130 |
| 12 | 26 | 6 | David Ragan | Roush Fenway Racing | Ford | 267 | 127 |
| 13 | 34 | 17 | Matt Kenseth | Roush Fenway Racing | Ford | 267 | 124 |
| 14 | 13 | 43 | A. J. Allmendinger | Richard Petty Motorsports | Ford | 267 | 121 |
| 15 | 21 | 5 | Mark Martin | Hendrick Motorsports | Chevrolet | 267 | 118 |
| 16 | 10 | 42 | Juan Pablo Montoya | Earnhardt Ganassi Racing | Chevrolet | 267 | 120 |
| 17 | 33 | 18 | Kyle Busch | Joe Gibbs Racing | Toyota | 267 | 112 |
| 18 | 30 | 12 | Brad Keselowski | Penske Racing | Dodge | 266 | 109 |
| 19 | 18 | 20 | Joey Logano | Joe Gibbs Racing | Toyota | 266 | 106 |
| 20 | 41 | 78 | Regan Smith | Furniture Row Racing | Chevrolet | 266 | 103 |
| 21 | 16 | 19 | Elliott Sadler | Richard Petty Motorsports | Ford | 266 | 100 |
| 22 | 19 | 39 | Ryan Newman | Stewart Haas Racing | Chevrolet | 266 | 97 |
| 23 | 25 | 88 | Dale Earnhardt Jr. | Hendrick Motorsports | Chevrolet | 266 | 94 |
| 24 | 5 | 77 | Sam Hornish Jr. | Penske Racing | Dodge | 266 | 91 |
| 25 | 2 | 48 | Jimmie Johnson | Hendrick Motorsports | Chevrolet | 266 | 98 |
| 26 | 22 | 2 | Kurt Busch | Penske Racing | Dodge | 265 | 85 |
| 27 | 24 | 83 | Reed Sorenson | Red Bull Racing Team | Toyota | 265 | 82 |
| 28 | 23 | 47 | Marcos Ambrose | JTG Daugherty Racing | Toyota | 265 | 79 |
| 29 | 20 | 09 | Bobby Labonte | Phoenix Racing | Chevrolet | 265 | 76 |
| 30 | 39 | 82 | Scott Speed | Red Bull Racing Team | Toyota | 264 | 73 |
| 31 | 43 | 38 | Travis Kvapil | Front Row Motorsports | Ford | 261 | 70 |
| 32 | 40 | 37 | David Gilliland | Front Row Motorsports | Ford | 261 | 67 |
| 33 | 42 | 34 | Kevin Conway | Front Row Motorsports | Ford | 256 | 64 |
| 34 | 27 | 29 | Kevin Harvick | Richard Childress Racing | Chevrolet | 251 | 61 |
| 35 | 4 | 16 | Greg Biffle | Roush Fenway Racing | Ford | 225 | 58 |
| 36 | 36 | 26 | David Stremme | Latitude 43 Motorsports | Ford | 184 | 55 |
| 37 | 29 | 21 | Bill Elliott | Wood Brothers Racing | Ford | 176 | 52 |
| 38 | 38 | 7 | Robby Gordon | Robby Gordon Motorsports | Toyota | 174 | 49 |
| 39 | 32 | 71 | Landon Cassill | TRG Motorsports | Chevrolet | 73 | 46 |
| 40 | 35 | 36 | Casey Mears | Tommy Baldwin Racing | Chevrolet | 49 | 43 |
| 41 | 37 | 32 | Mike Bliss | Braun Racing | Toyota | 40 | 40 |
| 42 | 31 | 13 | Max Papis | Germain Racing | Toyota | 40 | 37 |
| 43 | 28 | 87 | Joe Nemechek | NEMCO Motorsports | Toyota | 20 | 34 |

== Standings after the race ==
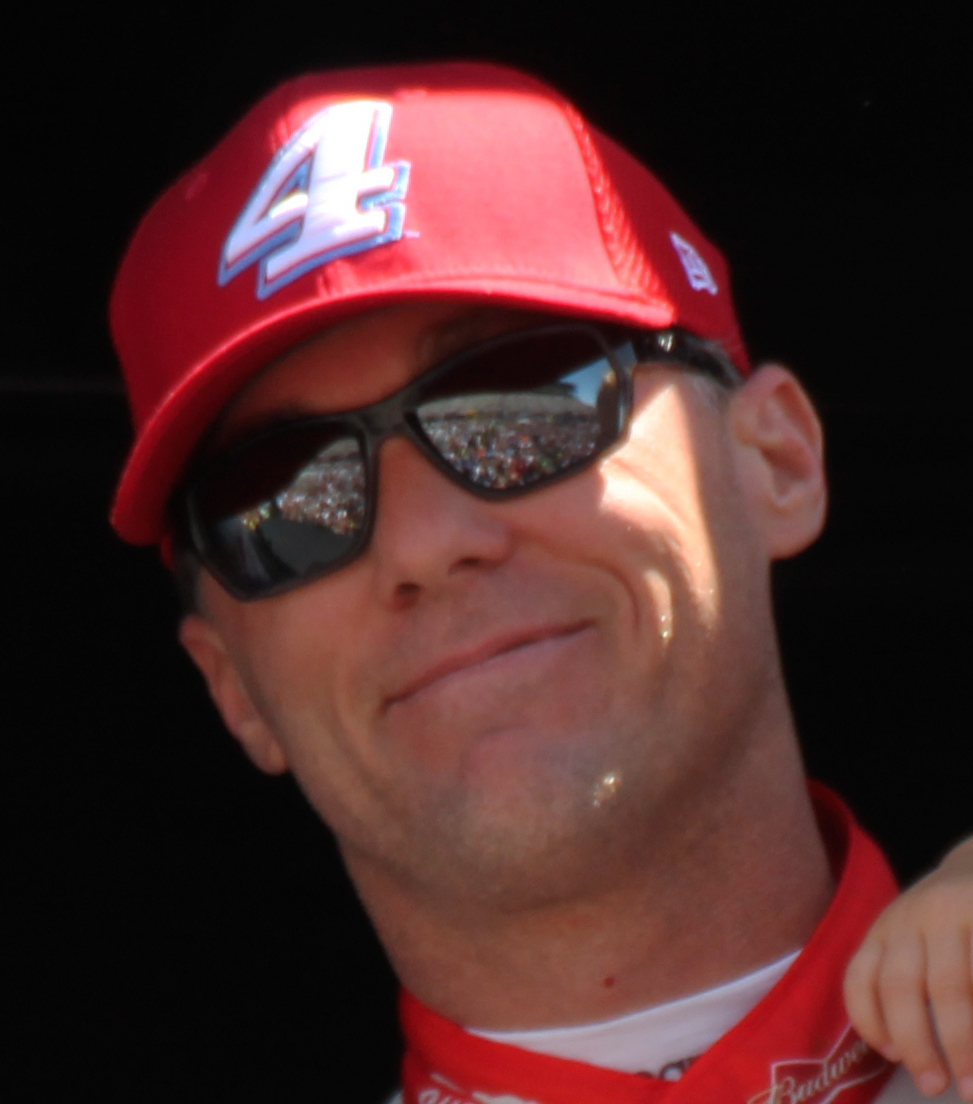
Kevin Harvick led the Driver's championship by 103 points after the race.

Drivers' Championship standings

| Pos | +/– | Driver | Points |
|---|---|---|---|
| 1 | | Kevin Harvick | 2,745 |
| 2 | | Jeff Gordon | 2,642 (–103) |
| 3 | | Jimmie Johnson | 2,557 (–188) |
| 4 | 1 | Denny Hamlin | 2,542 (–203) |
| 5 | 1 | Kurt Busch | 2,524 (–221) |
| 6 | | Kyle Busch | 2,488 (–257) |
| 7 | 1 | Jeff Burton | 2,465 (–280) |
| 8 | 1 | Matt Kenseth | 2,446 (–299) |
| 9 | | Tony Stewart | 2,389 (–356) |
| 10 | 2 | Carl Edwards | 2,345 (–400) |
Sources:

- Note: Only the top twelve positions are included for the driver standings.

| Previous race: 2010 Coke Zero 400 | Sprint Cup Series; 2010 season | Next race: 2010 Brickyard 400 |
