= 2009 Samsung 500 =

Race details
- Race 7 of 36 in the 2009 NASCAR Sprint Cup Series
- 2009 Samsung 500 program cover, with cover artwork by Sam Bass.
- Date: April 5, 2009
- Official name: Samsung 500
- Location: Texas Motor Speedway in Fort Worth, Texas
- Course: Permanent racing facility
- Course length: 1.5 miles (2.4 km)
- Distance: 334 laps, 501 mi (806.281 km)
- Weather: Temperatures reaching up to 79 °F (26 °C); wind speeds up to 25.1 miles per hour (40.4 km/h)
- Average speed: 146.372 miles per hour (235.563 km/h)

Pole position
Driver	David Reutimann	Michael Waltrip Racing
- Time: 28.344

Most laps led
Driver	Jeff Gordon	Hendrick Motorsports
- Laps: 105

Winner
No. 24	Jeff Gordon	Hendrick Motorsports

Television in the United States
- Network: Fox Broadcasting Company
- Announcers: Mike Joy, Darrell Waltrip and Larry McReynolds
- Nielsen ratings: 4.7/11 (Final); 4.2/10 (Overnight); (7.4 million)

The 2009 Samsung 500 was the seventh stock car race of the 2009 NASCAR Sprint Cup Series. It was held on April 5, 2009, at Texas Motor Speedway, in Fort Worth, Texas before a crowd of 176,300 people. The 334-lap race was won by Jeff Gordon of the Hendrick Motorsports team after starting from second position. His teammate Jimmie Johnson finished second and Roush Fenway Racing's Greg Biffle placed third.

Gordon was the Drivers' Championship leader with 959 points entering the event. David Reutimann won the pole position by recording the fastest lap time in the qualifying session, and maintained his lead going into the first corner to begin the race, but Gordon took over the lead before the first lap was over. Afterward, Reutimann took back the lead, holding it until Matt Kenseth passed him on lap 47. Gordon led after the final pit stops. In the final laps, Johnson was gaining on Gordon, but Gordon maintained the lead to achieve the race victory. There were six cautions and twenty-eight lead changes among thirteen different drivers during the race.

The race was Gordon's first win of the 2009 season, and the eighty-second of his career. The result kept Gordon in the lead of the Drivers' Championship, one-hundred and sixty-two ahead of Johnson, and one-hundred and eighty ahead of Kurt Busch. Chevrolet increased its lead in the Manufacturers' Championship, ten points ahead of Ford, who bumped Toyota to third place, with twenty-nine races remaining in the season remaining. The race attracted 7.4 million television viewers.

== Background ==
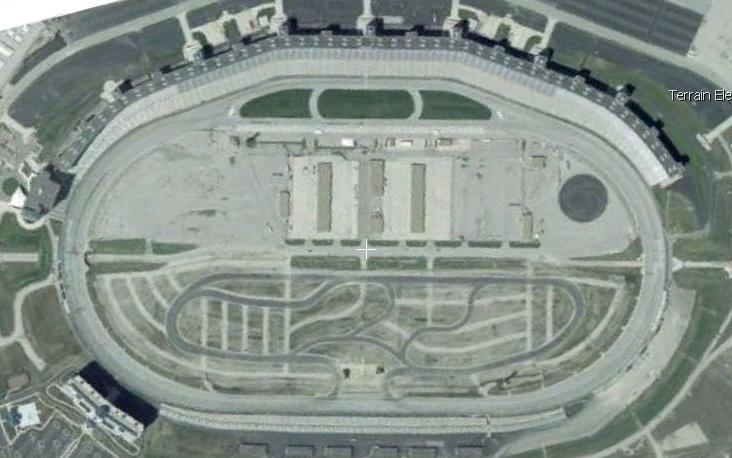
Texas Motor Speedway, were the race was held.

The 2009 Samsung 500 was the seventh of thirty-six scheduled stock car races of the 2009 NASCAR Sprint Cup Series. It took place on April 5, 2009, in Fort Worth, Texas, at Texas Motor Speedway, an intermediate track that holds NASCAR races. The standard track at Texas Motor Speedway is a four-turn quad-oval track that is 1.5 miles (2.4 km) long. The track's turns are banked at twenty-four degrees, and both the front stretch (the location of the finish line) and the back stretch have a five degree banking.

Before the race, Jeff Gordon led the Drivers' Championship with 959 points, followed by Clint Bowyer with 870. Kurt Busch was third with 827 points, Jimmie Johnson was fourth with 817 and Denny Hamlin was fifth with 811 points. Kurt's younger brother Kyle Busch, along with Tony Stewart, Carl Edwards, Kasey Kahne and Kevin Harvick rounded out the top ten. In the Manufacturers' Championship, Chevrolet was leading with 39 points, five points ahead of their rival Toyota. Ford, with 32 points, was five points ahead of Dodge in the battle for third place. Edwards was the race's defending champion.

Jeff Gordon had not won a race at Texas Motor Speedway in 16 attempts and said he would not base anything based on his second-place finish at the circuit in late 2008, "The team worked hard over the offseason and our performances on intermediate tracks have improved. We are just a different team with different race cars right now. Texas is one of those places that is on my radar. I want to turn things around and conquer it."

== Practice and qualifying ==
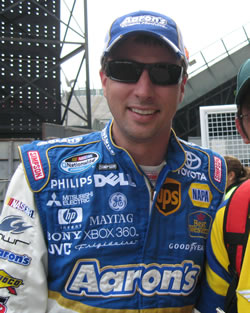
David Reutimann won pole position with the fastest time, 28.344.

Three practice sessions were before the Sunday race — one on Friday, and two on Saturday. The first session lasted 90 minutes, while the second session lasted 45 minutes. The third and final practice session lasted 60 minutes. During the first practice session, Mark Martin was fastest with a lap of 28.467 seconds, placing ahead of David Reutimann in second and Kurt Busch in third. Greg Biffle was scored fourth, and Johnson placed fifth. Jeff Gordon, Edwards, Dale Earnhardt Jr., David Stremme and David Ragan rounded out the top ten fastest drivers in the session.

Forty-eight drivers were entered in the qualifier on Friday afternoon; according to NASCAR's qualifying procedure, forty-three were allowed to race. Each driver ran two laps, with the starting order determined by the competitor's fastest times. Reutimann clinched his second pole position in the Sprint Cup Series, with a time of 28.344 seconds. He was joined on the grid's front row by Jeff Gordon, who held the pole position until Reutimann's lap. Matt Kenseth qualified third, Ragan took fourth in his best qualifying performance of the season, and Paul Menard started fifth to put three Fords in the first five places. Kahne in sixth was the sole Dodge driver in the top ten positions. Tony Stewart, Kyle Busch, Johnson were in places seventh to ninth. Joey Logano followed in tenth place due to his car being difficult to steer. The five drivers who failed to qualify were Joe Nemechek, Scott Speed, Jeremy Mayfield, Todd Bodine and Scott Riggs. After the qualifier Reutimann said, "We had a great car all day, right off the truck. This pole reminds me of how much things have changed for me in the past few years. I didn't make the field here two years ago, during a bad time in my racing career."

On Saturday morning, Reuitmann was fastest in the second practice session by setting a time of 28.999 seconds, ahead of Johnson in second, and Hamlin in third. Edwards was fourth quickest, and Jeff Gordon took fifth. Stewart, Kurt Busch, Kenseth, Bobby Labonte and Jeff Burton rounded out the top ten. Later that day, Johnson paced the final practice session with a time of 29.393 seconds, with Hamlin and Kyle Busch followed in second and third respectively. Jamie McMurray was fourth fastest, ahead of David Gilliland and Burton. Martin placed seventh, Edwards eighth, Juan Pablo Montoya ninth, and Martin Truex Jr. tenth.

=== Qualifying results ===
Grid	Car	Driver	Team	Manufacturer	Time	Speed
1	00	David Reutimann	Michael Waltrip Racing	Toyota	28.344	190.516
2	24	Jeff Gordon	Hendrick Motorsports	Chevrolet	28.392	190.194
3	17	Matt Kenseth	Roush Fenway Racing	Ford	28.428	189.954
4	6	David Ragan	Roush Fenway Racing	Ford	28.431	189.934
5	98	Paul Menard	Robert Yates Racing	Ford	28.435	189.907
6	9	Kasey Kahne	Evernham Motorsports	Dodge	28.436	189.000
7	14	Tony Stewart	Joe Gibbs Racing	Chevrolet	28.450	189.907
8	18	Kyle Busch	Joe Gibbs Racing	Toyota	28.507	189.427
9	48	Jimmie Johnson	Hendrick Motorsports	Chevrolet	28.508	189.421
10	20	Joey Logano	Joe Gibbs Racing	Toyota	28.531	189.268
11	47	Marcos Ambrose	JTG Daugherty Racing	Toyota	28.538	189.221
12	77	Sam Hornish Jr.	Team Penske	Dodge	28.539	189.215
13	99	Carl Edwards	Roush Fenway Racing	Ford	28.545	189.175
14	16	Greg Biffle	Roush Fenway Racing	Ford	28.548	189.155
15	31	Jeff Burton	Richard Childress Racing	Chevrolet	28.553	189.122
16	42	Juan Pablo Montoya	Earnhardt Ganassi Racing	Chevrolet	28.593	188.857
17	29	Kevin Harvick	Richard Childress Racing	Chevrolet	28.597	188.831
18	83	Brian Vickers	Red Bull Racing Team	Toyota	28.605	188.778
19	33	Clint Bowyer	Richard Childress Racing	Chevrolet	28.606	188.772
20	88	Dale Earnhardt Jr.	Hendrick Motorsports	Chevrolet	28.610	188.745
21	39	Ryan Newman	Stewart–Haas Racing	Chevrolet	28.628	188.626
22	11	Denny Hamlin	Joe Gibbs Racing	Toyota	28.641	188.541
23	5	Mark Martin	Hendrick Motorsports	Chevrolet	28.645	188.515
24	96	Bobby Labonte	Hall of Fame Racing	Ford	28.652	188.469
25	44	A. J. Allmendinger	Richard Petty Motorsports	Dodge	28.678	188.298
26	34	John Andretti	Front Row Motorsports	Chevrolet	28.679	188.291
27	09	Mike Bliss	Phoenix Racing	Dodge	28.722	188.009
28	2	Kurt Busch	Penske Championship Racing	Dodge	28.731	187.950
29	7	Robby Gordon	Robby Gordon Motorsports	Toyota	28.739	187.898
30	171	David Gilliland	TRG Motorsports	Chevrolet	28.749	187.833
31	1	Martin Truex Jr.	Earnhardt Ganassi Racing	Chevrolet	28.772	187.682
32	12	David Stremme	Penske Racing	Dodge	28.801	187.493
33	78	Regan Smith	Furniture Row Racing	Chevrolet	28.802	187.487
34	55	Michael Waltrip	Michael Waltrip Racing	Toyota	28.830	187.305
35	07	Casey Mears	Richard Childress Racing	Chevrolet	28.834	187.279
36	26	Jamie McMurray	Roush Fenway Racing	Ford	28.840	187.240
37	21	Bill Elliott	Wood Brothers Racing	Ford	28.871	187.039
38	43	Reed Sorenson	Richard Petty Motorsports	Dodge	28.885	186.948
39	113	Max Papis	Germain Racing	Toyota	28.955	186.496
40	25	Brad Keselowski	Hendrick Motorsports	Chevrolet	28.977	186.355
41	8	Aric Almirola	Earnhardt Ganassi Racing	Chevrolet	29.008	186.156
42	19	Elliott Sadler	Richard Petty Motorsports	Dodge	29.606	182.395
43	66	Dave Blaney	Prism Motorsports	Toyota	29.015	186.111
Failed to qualify
44	187	Joe Nemechek	NEMCO Motorsports	Toyota	29.027	186.034
45	82	Scott Speed	Red Bull Racing Team	Toyota	29.065	185.790
46	41	Jeremy Mayfield	Mayfield Motorsports	Toyota	29.135	185.344
47	64	Todd Bodine	Gunselman Motorsports	Toyota	29.261	184.546
48	36	Scott Riggs	Tommy Baldwin Racing	Toyota	29.352	183.974

== Race ==
Television coverage for the race began at 1:30 p.m. Eastern Daylight Time live in the United States on Fox. Commentary was provided by Mike Joy, Larry McReynolds, and Darrell Waltrip. Wind speeds at the start of the race were between 23 and 25 miles per hour (37 and 40 km/h). Roger Marsh of Texas Alliance Raceway Ministries began pre-race ceremonies with the invocation. Pianist Lewis Warren Jr. performed the national anthem, and contest winner Mark Fredde commanded the drivers to start their engines. No driver was required to move to the rear of the grid at the start of the race.

The race began at 2:17 p.m. Jeff Gordon passed Reuitmann almost immediately by the end of the first lap. Three laps later, Kurt Busch collided with Robby Gordon, with the latter sustaining minor damage and both drivers managed to continue. On lap eight, Reutimann took back the lead from Jeff Gordon by passing him in the third turn. Jeff Gordon dropped a further position when he was passed by Kenseth during the following lap. By lap 20, Reuitmann had a lead of about 1.6 seconds over Kenseth. Kurt Busch, who began the race in twenty-sixth, had moved up seven positions to nineteenth by lap 24. On lap 29, Stewart claimed fifth from Menard.

By lap 30, Earnhardt had moved up eight positions to twelfth. Ten laps later, Reutimann had maintained a lead of 1.7 seconds over Kenseth. On lap 42, Marcos Ambrose moved into seventh. Five laps later, Kenseth claimed the lead off Reutimann who was blocked by Casey Mears. On lap 51, green flag pit stops began, as Kenseth made a pit stop handling the lead to Stewart. On lap 54, Kyle Busch became the new race leader after Stewart came into pit road. Kyle Busch made a pit stop one lap later, handing the lead back to Kenseth. By lap 60, Kenseth had built up his lead over Reutimann by over two seconds. Eight laps later, Stewart passed Reutimann for second. On lap 79, Biffle passed Reutimann for third. Seven laps later, Stewart claimed the lead from Kenseth. During the 97th lap, debris was spotted on the backstretch, prompting the first caution of the race. During the caution, all of the drivers on the lead lap made pit stops. Kenseth reclaimed the lead and maintained it at the restart on lap 103.

On the 109th lap, Kyle Busch's car suffered a cut left front tire from contact with John Andretti, forcing Kyle Busch to come to pit road. Seven laps later, Biffle passed Kenseth on the outside in the dogleg for the lead, while Jeff Gordon passed Reuitmann for fourth thirteen laps later. By the 135th lap, Biffle had built a lead over Kenseth to three seconds. Green flag pit stops began on the 152nd lap; Kenseth made his pit stop on the same lap. Johnson and Biffle made a pit stop the next lap, handing the lead to Jeff Gordon. After pit stops, Biffle reclaimed the first position. On lap 157, Elliott Sadler spun out exiting the final corner and went sideways across the start/finish line, causing the second caution. None of the leaders elected to pit under the caution. The race restarted on lap 162 with Biffle in the lead, ahead of Kenseth and Jeff Gordon. By the 190th lap, Biffle's lead was three seconds. Another round of green flag pit stops began on lap 203 when Truex made a pit stop; Kenseth was the first of the leaders to pit the following lap. On lap 208, Jeff Gordon became the new race leader after Biffle came into pit road. After pit stops, Biffle reclaimed the top position.

On lap 220, the third caution was given when Ambrose's car suffered an engine failure. Jeff Gordon on the advice of his crew chief Steve Letarte over the radio remained on the circuit, and this promoted him to the lead and his car would not be affected by aerodynamic turbulence. Martin also stayed out on the circuit, while some of the leaders came to pit road. Earnhardt was required to make an additional pit stop because his crew needed to replace a missing lug nut. Jeff Gordon led the field back up to speed on the restart on lap 226. Five laps later, Sam Hornish Jr. spun exiting the second turn while driving alongside Bowyer and Labonte collided with the outside wall, prompting the fourth caution. During the caution, Johnson, Earnhardt and Hamlin made pit stops. Jeff Gordon stayed out of pit road and the led the field to restart on lap 237. Four laps later, Logano collided with the wall, but escaped with minor damage.

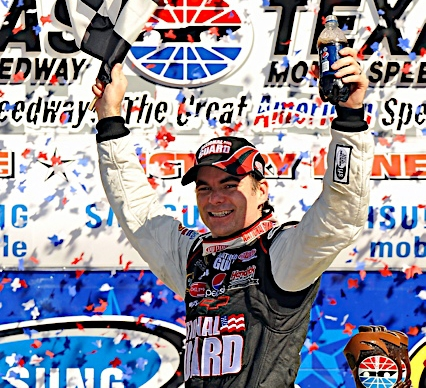
Jeff Gordon won the race and maintained his lead in the points standings.

Edwards moved into sixth on lap 247 during the 247th lap. Four laps later, a fifth caution came out when Robby Gordon's car suffered an engine failure. All of the leaders elected to pit under caution, giving the lead to Earnhardt. Kenseth was demoted from second to 15th position when lug nut issues on the right-rear tire during his pit stop caused him to remain in the pit lane for longer than usual. The race restarted on lap 259. On lap 260, Jeff Gordon moved back into the lead, while Earnhardt fell to the seventh position. Three laps later, Edwards passed Brian Vickers to move into ninth.

On lap 290, Earnhardt was forced onto pit road after colliding with the wall at turn two. One lap later, Ragan drove to pit road because of overheating issues. On the 294th lap, Edwards reclaimed the lead off Gordon, who was delayed by a slower vehicle, while Ragan entered the garage, three laps later. On lap 298, Stewart moved into second after passing Jeff Gordon. Four laps later, a sixth and final caution came out, after Stremme collided with the wall and spun going into turn three. Edwards relinquished the lead to Jeff Gordon during the yellow flag pit stop cycle when the front tires on his car were slow to be fitted; he was demoted to 11th position and fell out of contention for the victory.

Jeff Gordon led on the lap 309 restart. On the same lap, Johnson passed Stewart for the second position, while Jeff Gordon built up a 1.4 second lead four laps later. On the 314th lap, Biffle moved into the fourth position after overtaking Johnson. By lap 323, Jeff Gordon had increased his lead to 1.7 seconds over Johnson. Biffle overtook Stewart for third on the 330th lap. Jeff Gordon maintained the lead to win his first race of the 2009 season. Johnson finished second, ahead of Biffle in third, Stewart in fourth, and Kenseth in fifth. Martin, Montoya, Kurt Busch, Burton and Edwards rounded out the top ten finishers. There were twenty-eight lead changes among fourteen different drivers during the course of the race. Jeff Gordon led six times for a total of 105 laps, more than any other driver.

=== Post-race ===
""I knew we were going to get one eventually, We had some missed opportunities last season, but that keeps you driving hard and pushing forward."

— Jeff Gordon, speaking after the race.

Jeff Gordon appeared in victory lane to celebrate his first win of the 2009 season in front of 176,300 who attended the event, earning $541,874 in race winnings. Gordon was delighted with his victory: "Incredible team effort. This whole year has been amazing. What a great car. I've never had a car like this at Texas. We finally had one and put it in position." Johnson was happy with his second-place result, saying, "It was nice to get our car up front and get some clean air on it. We had to work really hard all day long to keep the car right. I'm very proud of the team." Third-place finisher Biffle was candid with his performance: "We worked our way all the way back to fourth, third – 15 more laps, would've passed [runner-up Jimmie Johnson] and then a little while longer we could've gotten [Gordon]. But, I just ran out of time, lost track position and weren't able to capitalize on it."

Earnhardt described his accident late in the race as him "Trying too hard and run well, and just got in to the wall down there in the middle of one and two. The car jumped sideways" and talked about his performance, "We were running pretty good all day. We were really fast." Edwards appeared to be certain that there would have been a different result had his slow pit stop late in the race not happened, saying, "I thought, 'If we can have just one more [good pit stop], we'll be all right. And then we went in leading and came out 11th, and that's what cost us the race." His teammate Kenseth commented on the lug nut fault that lost him positions and caused him to finish fifth, "You can't really do much about it. We just got to the back and it was extremely tough to pass, and we were just stuck back there racing with them guys." Stewart described his fourth-place as his team being "good today, we just weren't good enough", and said his team's vehicle was the quickest on the circuit at any time during the race after approximately 25 laps. Eighth-placed finisher Kurt Busch said his team believed that they could not challenge the major competitors, but admitted his strong result was "exactly what we needed. ... Our car was better on the long runs. We needed to be out there as long as we could and stretch it out."

The race results kept Jeff Gordon in the lead of the Drivers' Championship with 1154 points. Johnson, who finished behind Gordon, moved to second on 992, eighteen points ahead of Kurt Busch and twenty-five ahead of Bowyer. In the Manufacturers' Championship, Chevrolet increased their points total to 48, while Ford advanced to second with 38 and Toyota was bumped to third with 37. 7.4 million people watched the race on television. The race took three hours, twenty-five minutes and twenty-two seconds to complete, and the margin of victory was 0.378 seconds.

=== Race results ===
Pos	Grid	Car	Driver	Team	Manufacturer	Laps run	Points
1	2	24	Jeff Gordon	Hendrick Motorsports	Chevrolet	334	195^{2}
2	9	48	Jimmie Johnson	Hendrick Motorsports	Chevrolet	334	175^{1}
3	14	16	Greg Biffle	Roush Fenway Racing	Ford	334	170^{1}
4	7	14	Tony Stewart	Joe Gibbs Racing	Chevrolet	334	165^{1}
5	3	17	Matt Kenseth	Roush Fenway Racing	Ford	334	160^{1}
6	23	5	Mark Martin	Hendrick Motorsports	Chevrolet	334	155^{1}
7	16	42	Juan Pablo Montoya	Earnhardt Ganassi Racing	Chevrolet	334	146
8	28	2	Kurt Busch	Penske Championship Racing	Dodge	334	147^{1}
9	15	31	Jeff Burton	Richard Childress Racing	Chevrolet	334	138
10	13	99	Carl Edwards	Roush Fenway Racing	Ford	334	139^{1}
11	1	00	David Reuitmann	Michael Waltrip Racing	Toyota	334	135^{1}
12	22	11	Denny Hamlin	Joe Gibbs Racing	Toyota	334	127
13	5	98	Paul Menard	Robert Yates Racing	Ford	334	129^{1}
14	32	12	David Stremme	Phoenix Racing	Dodge	334	121
15	21	39	Ryan Newman	Stewart–Haas Racing	Chevrolet	334	118
16	18	83	Brian Vickers	Red Bull Racing Team	Toyota	334	120^{1}
17	12	77	Sam Hornish Jr.	Team Penske	Dodge	334	112
18	8	18	Kyle Busch	Joe Gibbs Racing	Toyota	333	114^{1}
19	6	9	Kasey Kahne	Evernham Motorsports	Dodge	333	106
20	20	88	Dale Earnhardt Jr.	Hendrick Motorsports	Chevrolet	333	108^{1}
21	35	07	Casey Mears	Richard Childress Racing	Chevrolet	333	100
22	19	33	Clint Bowyer	Richard Childress Racing	Chevrolet	333	97
23	40	25	Brad Keselowski	Hendrick Motorsports	Chevrolet	332	94
24	34	55	Michael Waltrip	Michael Waltrip Racing	Toyota	332	91
25	31	1	Martin Truex Jr.	Earnhardt Ganassi Racing	Chevrolet	332	88
26	26	34	John Andretti	Front Row Motorsports	Chevrolet	332	85
27	17	29	Kevin Harvick	Richard Childress Racing	Chevrolet	331	72
28	37	21	Bill Elliott	Wood Brothers Racing	Ford	331	79
29	30	171	David Gilliland	TRG Motorsports	Chevrolet	330	76
30	10	20	Joey Logano	Joe Gibbs Racing	Chevrolet	330	73
31	33	78	Regan Smith	Furniture Row Racing	Chevrolet	330	70
32	42	19	Elliott Sadler	Richard Petty Motorsports	Dodge	329	67
33	41	8	Aric Almirola	Earnhardt Ganassi Racing	Chevrolet	328	64
34	25	44	A. J. Allmendinger	Richard Petty Motorsports	Dodge	328	61
35	39	113	Max Papis	Germain Racing	Toyota	326	58
36	38	43	Reed Sorenson	Richard Petty Motorsports	Dodge	315	55
37	4	6	David Ragan	Roush Fenway Racing	Ford	293	52^{1}
38	36	26	Jamie McMurray	Roush Fenway Racing	Ford	255	49
39	29	7	Robby Gordon	Robby Gordon Motorsports	Toyota	249	46
40	24	96	Bobby Labonte	Hall of Fame Racing	Ford	229	43
41	11	47	Marcos Ambrose	JTG Daugherty Racing	Toyota	216	40
42	27	09	Mike Bliss	Phoenix Racing	Dodge	76	37
43	43	66	Dave Blaney	Prism Motorsports	Toyota	48	34
^{1} Includes five bonus points for leading a lap
^{2} Includes ten bonus points for leading the most laps

== Standings after the race ==
Drivers' Championship standings

Pos	+/–	Driver	Points
1		Jeff Gordon	1154
2	2	Jimmie Johnson	992 (−162)
3		Kurt Busch	974 (−180)
4	2	Clint Bowyer	967 (−187)
5	2	Tony Stewart	963 (−191)

Manufacturers' Championship standings

Pos	+/–	Manufacturer	Points
1		Chevrolet	48
2	1	Ford	38 (−10)
3	1	Toyota	37 (−11)
4		Dodge	31 (−17)

- Note: Only the top five positions are included for the driver standings.

Previous race: 2009 Goody's Fast Pain Relief 500	Sprint Cup Series; 2009 season	Next race: 2009 Subway Fresh Fit 500
