= 2013 Goody's Headache Relief Shot 500 =

Race details
- Race 33 of 36 in the 2013 NASCAR Sprint Cup Series
- A map showing the layout of Martinsville Speedway
- Date: October 27, 2013
- Location: Martinsville Speedway, Ridgeway, Virginia
- Course: Permanent racing facility
- Course length: .526 miles (.847 km)
- Distance: 500 laps, 263 mi (423 km)
- Weather: Temperatures reaching an average of 66.9 °F (19.4 °C); wind speeds reaching an average of 8 miles per hour (13 km/h)

Pole position
Driver	Denny Hamlin	Joe Gibbs Racing
- Time: 19.013 seconds

Most laps led
Driver	Matt Kenseth	Joe Gibbs Racing
- Laps: 202

Winner
No. 24	Jeff Gordon	Hendrick Motorsports

Television in the United States
- Network: ESPN
- Announcers: Allen Bestwick, Dale Jarrett and Andy Petree

The 2013 Goody's Headache Relief Shot 500 was a NASCAR Sprint Cup Series stock car race that was held on October 27, 2013, at Martinsville Speedway in Ridgeway, Virginia. Contested over 500 laps on the 0.526-mile (0.847 km) oval, it was the thirty-third race of the 2013 Sprint Cup Series season, as well as the seventh race in the ten-race Chase for the Sprint Cup, which ends the season. Jeff Gordon of Hendrick Motorsports won the race, his first and only win of the season, breaking a 33-race winless streak, while Matt Kenseth finished second and Clint Bowyer finished third.

== Report ==
=== Background ===
Coming into the race, Jimmie Johnson was the chosen by the pundits to be the favorite along with Kyle Busch, Kasey Kahne and Matt Kenseth. Ten drivers were depicted as the underdogs for this race including Danica Patrick, Juan Pablo Montoya, Marcos Ambrose and Paul Menard.

Johnson had the advantage in the Sprint Cup Series championship points while Kyle Busch and Jeff Gordon were within easy striking distance of taking the championship lead away from him.

== Entry list ==
(R) - Denotes rookie driver.

(i) - Denotes driver who is ineligible for series driver points.

No.	Driver	Team	Manufacturer
1	Jamie McMurray	Earnhardt Ganassi Racing	Chevrolet
2	Brad Keselowski	Penske Racing	Ford
5	Kasey Kahne	Hendrick Motorsports	Chevrolet
7	Dave Blaney	Tommy Baldwin Racing	Chevrolet
9	Marcos Ambrose	Richard Petty Motorsports	Ford
10	Danica Patrick (R)	Stewart–Haas Racing	Chevrolet
11	Denny Hamlin	Joe Gibbs Racing	Toyota
13	Casey Mears	Germain Racing	Ford
14	Mark Martin	Stewart–Haas Racing	Chevrolet
15	Clint Bowyer	Michael Waltrip Racing	Toyota
16	Greg Biffle	Roush Fenway Racing	Ford
17	Ricky Stenhouse Jr. (R)	Roush Fenway Racing	Ford
18	Kyle Busch	Joe Gibbs Racing	Toyota
20	Matt Kenseth	Joe Gibbs Racing	Toyota
22	Joey Logano	Penske Racing	Ford
24	Jeff Gordon	Hendrick Motorsports	Chevrolet
27	Paul Menard	Richard Childress Racing	Chevrolet
29	Kevin Harvick	Richard Childress Racing	Chevrolet
30	Cole Whitt (i)	Swan Racing	Toyota
31	Jeff Burton	Richard Childress Racing	Chevrolet
32	Ken Schrader	FAS Lane Racing	Ford
33	Tony Raines (i)	Circle Sport	Chevrolet
34	David Ragan	Front Row Motorsports	Ford
35	Josh Wise (i)	Front Row Motorsports	Ford
36	J. J. Yeley	Tommy Baldwin Racing	Chevrolet
38	David Gilliland	Front Row Motorsports	Ford
39	Ryan Newman	Stewart–Haas Racing	Chevrolet
40	Landon Cassill (i)	Circle Sport	Chevrolet
41	Aric Almirola	Richard Petty Motorsports	Ford
42	Juan Pablo Montoya	Earnhardt Ganassi Racing	Chevrolet
47	Bobby Labonte	JTG Daugherty Racing	Toyota
48	Jimmie Johnson	Hendrick Motorsports	Chevrolet
51	Kyle Larson (i)	HScott Motorsports	Chevrolet
55	Elliott Sadler (i)	Michael Waltrip Racing	Toyota
56	Martin Truex Jr.	Michael Waltrip Racing	Toyota
78	Kurt Busch	Furniture Row Racing	Chevrolet
83	David Reutimann	BK Racing	Toyota
87	Joe Nemechek (i)	NEMCO-Jay Robinson Racing	Toyota
88	Dale Earnhardt Jr.	Hendrick Motorsports	Chevrolet
93	Travis Kvapil	BK Racing	Toyota
95	Reed Sorenson (i)	Leavine Family Racing	Ford
98	Michael McDowell	Phil Parsons Racing	Ford
99	Carl Edwards	Roush Fenway Racing	Ford
Official entry list

== Qualifying results ==
Pos	No.	Driver	Team	Manufacturer	Time
1	11	Denny Hamlin	Joe Gibbs Racing	Toyota	19.013
2	48	Jimmie Johnson	Hendrick Motorsports	Chevrolet	19.061
3	18	Kyle Busch	Joe Gibbs Racing	Toyota	19.061
4	20	Matt Kenseth	Joe Gibbs Racing	Toyota	19.092
5	15	Clint Bowyer	Michael Waltrip Racing	Toyota	19.096
6	22	Joey Logano	Penske Racing	Ford	19.111
7	1	Jamie McMurray	Earnhardt Ganassi Racing	Chevrolet	19.126
8	34	David Ragan	Front Row Motorsports	Ford	19.163
9	24	Jeff Gordon	Hendrick Motorsports	Chevrolet	19.168
10	29	Kevin Harvick	Richard Childress Racing	Chevrolet	19.171
11	2	Brad Keselowski	Penske Racing	Ford	19.176
12	88	Dale Earnhardt Jr.	Hendrick Motorsports	Chevrolet	19.183
13	42	Juan Pablo Montoya	Earnhardt Ganassi Racing	Chevrolet	19.185
14	99	Carl Edwards	Roush Fenway Racing	Ford	19.194
15	56	Martin Truex Jr.	Michael Waltrip Racing	Toyota	19.214
16	9	Marcos Ambrose	Richard Petty Motorsports	Ford	19.214
17	39	Ryan Newman	Stewart–Haas Racing	Chevrolet	19.219
18	41	Aric Almirola	Richard Petty Motorsports	Ford	19.242
19	78	Kurt Busch	Team Penske	Ford	19.244
20	17	Ricky Stenhouse Jr.	Roush Fenway Racing	Ford	19.245
21	14	Mark Martin	Stewart–Haas Racing	Chevrolet	19.248
22	31	Jeff Burton	Richard Childress Racing	Chevrolet	19.258
23	27	Paul Menard	Roush Fenway Racing	Ford	19.297
24	40	Landon Cassill	Circle Sport Racing	Chevrolet	19.312
25	5	Kasey Kahne	Hendrick Motorsports	Chevrolet	19.313
26	51	Kyle Larson	HScott Motorsports	Chevrolet	19.328
27	38	David Gilliland	Front Row Motorsports	Ford	19.351
28	13	Casey Mears	Germain Racing	Ford	19.356
29	7	Dave Blaney	Tommy Baldwin Racing	Chevrolet	19.366
30	30	Cole Whitt	Swan Racing Company	Toyota	19.366
31	35	Josh Wise	Front Row Motorsports	Ford	19.387
32	93	Travis Kvapil	BK Racing	Toyota	19.398
33	16	Greg Biffle	Roush Fenway Racing	Ford	19.408
34	47	Bobby Labonte	JTG Daugherty Racing	Toyota	19.422
35	55	Elliott Sadler	Michael Waltrip Racing	Toyota	19.427
36	98	Michael McDowell	Phil Parsons Racing	Ford	19.432
37	36	J. J. Yeley	Tommy Baldwin Racing	Chevrolet	19.446
38	32	Ken Schrader	FAS Lane Racing	Ford	19.501
39	33	Tony Raines	Circle Sport Racing	Chevrolet	19.504
40	87	Joe Nemechek	NEMCO-Jay Robinson Racing	Toyota	19.511
41	10	Danica Patrick	Stewart–Haas Racing	Chevrolet	19.571
42	95	Reed Sorenson	Leavine Family Racing	Ford	19.757
43	83	David Reutimann	BK Racing	Toyota	19.976

=== Race ===
David Ragan blew his engine on lap 109, with Kyle Larson having a similar incident on lap 160. Tony Raines developed problems with his brakes on lap 220 while Dave Blaney was involved in a terminal crash on lap 357. The final DNF of the race came from David Reutimann, who had troubles with his rear gear on lap 451 and had to leave the race prematurely.

Approximately 22% of the race was held under a caution flag while the average green flag run was nearly 22 laps. Most of the yellow flags in this race were caused by accidents, debris and cars spinning dangerously out of control.

Jeff Burton, Greg Biffle, Jeff Gordon, Matt Kenseth and Jimmie Johnson had the fastest pit crews in the race, with the average time on pit road being 41 seconds.

There were seven total penalties during the course of the race. Ricky Stenhouse Jr. was penalized twice for too many men over the wall. Ken Schrader, and Kasey Kahne were also penalized for too many men over the wall. Ryan Newman was penalized for Lug nut(s) not installed, and Ken Schrader and David Reutimann were both penalized for too fast entering pits.

=== Results ===
Pos	No	Driver	Team	Manufacturer	Laps	Points
1	24	Jeff Gordon	Hendrick Motorsports	Chevrolet	500	47
2	20	Matt Kenseth	Joe Gibbs Racing	Toyota	500	44
3	15	Clint Bowyer	Michael Waltrip Racing	Toyota	500	42
4	2	Brad Keselowski	Penske Racing	Ford	500	40
5	48	Jimmie Johnson	Hendrick Motorsports	Chevrolet	500	50
6	29	Kevin Harvick	Richard Childress Racing	Chevrolet	500	38
7	11	Denny Hamlin	Joe Gibbs Racing	Toyota	500	38
8	88	Dale Earnhardt Jr.	Hendrick Motorsports	Chevrolet	500	36
9	16	Greg Biffle	Roush Fenway Racing	Ford	500	35
10	1	Jamie McMurray	Earnhardt Ganassi Racing	Chevrolet	500	34
11	31	Jeff Burton	Richard Childress Racing	Chevrolet	500	34
12	99	Carl Edwards	Roush Fenway Racing	Ford	500	32
13	42	Juan Pablo Montoya	Earnhardt Ganassi Racing	Chevrolet	500	31
14	22	Joey Logano	Penske Racing	Ford	500	30
15	18	Kyle Busch	Joe Gibbs Racing	Toyota	500	30
16	56	Martin Truex Jr.	Michael Waltrip Racing	Toyota	500	28
17	10	Danica Patrick	Stewart–Haas Racing	Chevrolet	499	27
18	78	Kurt Busch	Furniture Row Racing	Chevrolet	499	26
19	9	Marcos Ambrose	Richard Petty Motorsports	Ford	499	25
20	41	Aric Almirola	Richard Petty Motorsports	Ford	499	24
21	13	Casey Mears	Germain Racing	Ford	499	23
22	27	Paul Menard	Richard Childress Racing	Chevrolet	499	22
23	38	David Gilliland	Front Row Motorsports	Ford	499	21
24	93	Travis Kvapil	BK Racing	Toyota	499	20
25	55	Elliott Sadler	Michael Waltrip Racing	Toyota	499	0
26	98	Michael McDowell	Phil Parsons Racing	Ford	498	18
27	5	Kasey Kahne	Hendrick Motorsports	Chevrolet	497	17
28	32	Ken Schrader	FAS Lane Racing	Ford	496	16
29	40	Landon Cassill	Circle Sport Racing	Chevrolet	495	0
30	36	J. J. Yeley	Tommy Baldwin Racing	Chevrolet	495	14
31	17	Ricky Stenhouse Jr.	Roush Fenway Racing	Ford	495	13
32	47	Bobby Labonte	JTG Daugherty Racing	Toyota	494	12
33	87	Joe Nemechek	NEMCO-Jay Robinson Racing	Toyota	493	0
34	35	Josh Wise	Front Row Motorsports	Ford	490	0
35	30	Cole Whitt	Swan Racing Company	Toyota	459	0
36	14	Mark Martin	Stewart–Haas Racing	Chevrolet	455	8
37	83	David Reutimann	BK Racing	Toyota	451	7
38	39	Ryan Newman	Stewart–Haas Racing	Chevrolet	432	6
39	7	Dave Blaney	Tommy Baldwin Racing	Chevrolet	357	5
40	95	Reed Sorenson	Leavine Family Racing	Ford	275	0
41	33	Tony Raines	Circle Sport Racing	Chevrolet	220	0
42	51	Kyle Larson	HScott Motorsports	Chevrolet	160	0
43	34	David Ragan	Front Row Motorsports	Ford	109	1
Official race results

== Standings after the race ==
Drivers' Championship standings

	Pos	Driver	Points
1	1	Matt Kenseth	2294
1	1	Jimmie Johnson	-0
2	3	Jeff Gordon	-27
1	4	Kevin Harvick	-28
2	5	Kyle Busch	-36
2	6	Clint Bowyer	-55
1	7	Dale Earnhardt Jr.	-56
1	8	Greg Biffle	-58
	9	Kurt Busch	-75
	10	Carl Edwards	-76
1	11	Joey Logano	-85
1	12	Ryan Newman	-106
	13	Kasey Kahne	-124

- Note: Only the first thirteen positions are included for the driver standings.

Previous race: 2013 Camping World RV Sales 500	Sprint Cup Series; 2013 season	Next race: 2013 AAA Texas 500
