= 2009 Goody's Fast Pain Relief 500 =

Race details
- Race 6 of 36 in the 2009 NASCAR Sprint Cup Series
- 2009 Goody's Fast Pain Relief 500 program cover
- Date: March 29, 2009
- Official name: Goody's Fast Pain Relief 500
- Location: Martinsville Speedway, Ridgeway, Virginia
- Course: Permanent racing facility
- Course length: 0.526 miles (0.85 km)
- Distance: 508 laps, 267 mi (430 km)
- Weather: Mild with temperatures approaching 75 °F (24 °C); wind speeds up to 23.9 miles per hour (38.5 km/h)
- Average speed: 75.938 miles per hour (122.210 km/h)
- Attendance: 63,000

Pole position
Driver	Jeff Gordon	Hendrick Motorsports

Most laps led
Driver	Denny Hamlin	Joe Gibbs Racing
- Laps: 296

Winner
No. 48	Jimmie Johnson	Hendrick Motorsports

Television in the United States
- Network: Fox Broadcasting Company
- Announcers: Mike Joy, Darrell Waltrip and Larry McReynolds

The 2009 Goody's Fast Pain Relief 500 was held on March 29, 2009 at Martinsville Speedway in Ridgeway, Virginia. It was the sixth race of the 2009 NASCAR Sprint Cup Series season. The winner was Jimmie Johnson, who led 42 laps, followed by Denny Hamlin and Tony Stewart in second and third place.

There were no time trials because of rain during the previous days. A live audience of 63,000 attended the event, which lasted three hours and 27 minutes. Last-place finisher Todd Bodine quit on lap 3 due to engine problems. Robby Gordon, Joe Nemechek and Dave Blaney also failed to finish. 13% of the race was run under caution; the average green flag run lasted about 33 laps. Most of the incidents that brought out the yellow flag were crashes. Five drivers failed to qualify, including Sterling Marlin, Tony Raines and Dennis Setzer.

Jeff Gordon often battled Denny Hamlin and Clint Bowyer for the lead. Gordon finished fourth and Bowyer finished fifth.

== Entry list ==
No.	Driver	Make	Team
00	David Reutimann	Toyota	Michael Waltrip
1	Martin Truex Jr.	Chevrolet	Teresa Earnhardt
2	Kurt Busch	Dodge	Walter Czarnecki
5	Mark Martin	Chevrolet	Mary Hendrick
6	David Ragan	Ford	Mike Dee
07	Casey Mears	Chevrolet	Richard Childress
7	Robby Gordon	Toyota	Robby Gordon
8	Aric Almirola	Chevrolet	Chip Ganassi
09	Sterling Marlin	Dodge	James Finch
9	Kasey Kahne	Dodge	George Gillett Jr
11	Denny Hamlin	Toyota	J D Gibbs
12	David Stremme	Dodge	Roger Penske
14	Tony Stewart	Chevrolet	Margaret Haas
16	Greg Biffle	Ford	Jack Roush
17	Matt Kenseth	Ford	John Henry
18	Kyle Busch	Toyota	Joe Gibbs
19	Elliott Sadler	Dodge	George Gillett Jr
20	Joey Logano	Toyota	Joe Gibbs
24	Jeff Gordon	Chevrolet	Rick Hendrick
26	Jamie McMurray	Ford	Geoff Smith
29	Kevin Harvick	Chevrolet	Richard Childress
31	Jeff Burton	Chevrolet	Richard Childress
33	Clint Bowyer	Chevrolet	Bobby Ginn III
34	John Andretti	Chevrolet	Teresa Earnhardt
36	Scott Riggs	Toyota	Tommy Baldwin
37	Tony Raines	Chevrolet	Brad Jenkins
39	Ryan Newman	Chevrolet	Tony Stewart
41	Jeremy Mayfield	Toyota	Jeremy Mayfield
42	Juan Pablo Montoya	Chevrolet	Teresa Earnhardt
43	Reed Sorenson	Dodge	Richard Petty
44	AJ Allmendinger	Dodge	George Gillett Jr.
46	Dennis Setzer	Dodge	Danielle Long
47	Marcos Ambrose	Toyota	Rob Kauffman
48	Jimmie Johnson	Chevrolet	Jeff Gordon
55	Michael Waltrip	Toyota	Michael Waltrip
64	Todd Bodine	Toyota	Larry Gunselman
66	Dave Blaney	Toyota	Phil Parsons
71	David Gilliland	Chevrolet	Kevin Buckler
75	Derrike Cope	Dodge	Derrike Cope
77	Sam Hornish Jr.	Dodge	Bill Davis
82	Scott Speed	Toyota	Dietrich Mateschitz
83	Brian Vickers	Toyota	Dietrich Mateschitz
87	Joe Nemechek	Toyota	Andrea Nemechek
88	Dale Earnhardt Jr.	Chevrolet	Rick Hendrick
96	Bobby Labonte	Ford	Jeffrey Moorad
98	Paul Menard	Ford	Max Jones
99	Carl Edwards	Ford	Jack Roush

== Qualifying ==
Qualifying was rained out. By owner's points, Jeff Gordon would win the pole.

=== Starting lineup ===
Pos.	No.	Driver	Make
1	24	Jeff Gordon	Chevrolet
2	2	Kurt Busch	Dodge
3	33	Clint Bowyer	Chevrolet
4	18	Kyle Busch	Toyota
5	99	Carl Edwards	Ford
6	9	Kasey Kahne	Dodge
7	14	Tony Stewart	Chevrolet
8	11	Denny Hamlin	Toyota
9	48	Jimmie Johnson	Chevrolet
10	17	Matt Kenseth	Ford
11	00	David Reutimann	Toyota
12	29	Kevin Harvick	Chevrolet
13	31	Jeff Burton	Chevrolet
14	83	Brian Vickers	Toyota
15	42	Juan Pablo Montoya	Chevrolet
16	44	A.J. Allmendinger	Dodge
17	19	Elliott Sadler	Dodge
18	16	Greg Biffle	Ford
19	88	Dale Earnhardt, Jr.	Chevrolet
20	1	Martin Truex, Jr.	Chevrolet
21	55	Michael Waltrip	Toyota
22	12	David Stremme	Dodge
23	96	Bobby Labonte	Ford
24	47	Marcos Ambrose	Toyota
25	07	Casey Mears	Chevrolet
26	6	David Ragan	Ford
27	39	Ryan Newman	Chevrolet
28	26	Jamie McMurray	Ford
29	43	Reed Sorenson	Dodge
30	7	Robby Gordon	Toyota
31	5	Mark Martin	Chevrolet
32	77	Sam Hornish, Jr.	Dodge
33	34	John Andretti	Chevrolet
34	20	Joey Logano	Toyota
35	71	David Gilliland	Chevrolet
36	82	Scott Speed	Toyota
37	8	Aric Almirola	Chevrolet
38	98	Paul Menard	Ford
39	66	Dave Blaney	Toyota
40	36	Scott Riggs	Toyota
41	87	Joe Nemechek	Toyota
42	41	Jeremy Mayfield	Toyota
43	64	Todd Bodine	Toyota
Failed to qualify			
44	09	Sterling Marlin	Dodge
45	37	Tony Raines	Chevrolet
46	46	Dennis Setzer	Dodge
47	75	Derrike Cope	Dodge
WD	73	Mike Garvey	Dodge

== Race results ==
Fin	St	No.	Driver	Make	Laps	Led	Status	Pts	Winnings
1	9	48	Jimmie Johnson	Chevrolet	500	42	running	190	213626
2	8	11	Denny Hamlin	Toyota	500	296	running	180	149000
3	7	14	Tony Stewart	Chevrolet	500	0	running	165	119273
4	1	24	Jeff Gordon	Chevrolet	500	147	running	165	138951
5	3	33	Clint Bowyer	Chevrolet	500	0	running	155	94875
6	27	39	Ryan Newman	Chevrolet	500	0	running	150	112554
7	31	5	Mark Martin	Chevrolet	500	0	running	146	90750
8	19	88	Dale Earnhardt, Jr.	Chevrolet	500	0	running	142	95725
9	16	44	A.J. Allmendinger	Dodge	500	0	running	138	81425
10	28	26	Jamie McMurray	Ford	500	0	running	134	93125
11	12	29	Kevin Harvick	Chevrolet	500	0	running	130	116878
12	15	42	Juan Pablo Montoya	Chevrolet	500	0	running	127	118473
13	21	55	Michael Waltrip	Toyota	500	0	running	124	87450
14	24	47	Marcos Ambrose	Toyota	500	0	running	121	94773
15	13	31	Jeff Burton	Chevrolet	500	0	running	118	122331
16	23	96	Bobby Labonte	Ford	500	1	running	120	106404
17	29	43	Reed Sorenson	Dodge	500	0	running	112	114701
18	2	2	Kurt Busch	Dodge	500	0	running	109	91975
19	6	9	Kasey Kahne	Dodge	500	0	running	106	115473
20	11	00	David Reutimann	Toyota	499	0	running	103	99923
21	25	07	Casey Mears	Chevrolet	499	0	running	100	91175
22	22	12	David Stremme	Dodge	499	0	running	97	108715
23	10	17	Matt Kenseth	Ford	499	0	running	94	119715
24	4	18	Kyle Busch	Toyota	498	0	running	91	119798
25	38	98	Paul Menard	Ford	498	0	running	88	105706
26	5	99	Carl Edwards	Ford	498	0	running	85	120856
27	26	6	David Ragan	Ford	498	0	running	82	82375
28	18	16	Greg Biffle	Ford	498	0	running	79	90675
29	20	1	Martin Truex, Jr.	Chevrolet	498	0	running	76	108890
30	40	36	Scott Riggs	Toyota	497	0	running	73	72275
31	17	19	Elliott Sadler	Dodge	497	0	running	70	81625
32	34	20	Joey Logano	Toyota	496	0	running	67	119326
33	14	83	Brian Vickers	Toyota	496	0	running	64	101073
34	32	77	Sam Hornish, Jr.	Dodge	496	0	running	61	88885
35	33	34	John Andretti	Chevrolet	496	0	running	58	79025
36	35	71	David Gilliland	Chevrolet	492	0	running	55	70025
37	37	8	Aric Almirola	Chevrolet	490	0	running	52	77950
38	42	41	Jeremy Mayfield	Toyota	441	1	running	54	69900
39	36	82	Scott Speed	Toyota	424	12	running	51	81923
40	30	7	Robby Gordon	Toyota	349	0	engine	43	88535
41	41	87	Joe Nemechek	Toyota	90	0	brakes	40	69725
42	39	66	Dave Blaney	Toyota	49	1	rear-gear	42	69665
43	43	64	Todd Bodine	Toyota	3	0	engine	34	69214

== Timeline ==
- Start of race: Jeff Gordon had the pole position to start the race before losing it to Dave Blaney on lap 44
- Lap 3: Engine problems put Todd Bodine out of the race; making him the last-place finisher
- Lap 22: Caution due to David Stremme and Michael Waltrip's accident; green flag racing resumed on lap 26
- Lap 42: Mandatory competition caution handed out by NASCAR; ended on lap 47
- Lap 45: Scott Speed took over the lead from Dave Blaney before losing it to Jeff Gordon on lap 57
- Lap 49: A problem with Dave Blaney's rear gear knocked him out of the race
- Lap 57: Jeff Gordon took over the lead from Scott Speed before losing it to Jeremy Mayfield on lap 141
- Lap 71: Caution due to Kyle Busch and Scott Speed's accident; green flag racing resumed on lap 75
- Lap 90: Joe Nemechek had problems with his brakes; ending his day on the track
- Lap 92: Robby Gordon spun his tires on turn 2; causing a caution that lasted until lap 96
- Lap 140: Caution due to David Ragan and Robby Gordon's accident; green flag racing resumed on lap 143
- Lap 156: Denny Hamlin took over the lead from Jeff Gordon before losing it back to him on lap 343
- Lap 255: Caution due to Scott Speed's accident; green flag racing resumed on lap 264
- Lap 349: Engine problems ended Robby Gordon's race weekend prematurely
- Lap 353: Caution due to debris; green flag racing resumed on lap 358
- Lap 356: Denny Hamlin took over the lead from Bobby Labonte before losing it to Jimmie Johnson on lap 430
- Lap 368: Robby Gordon spun his tires on turn 4; causing a caution that lasted until Lap 371
- Lap 429: Caution due to Jeremy Mayfield's accident; green flag racing resumed on Lap 433
- Lap 430: Jimmie Johnson took over the lead from Denny Hamlin before losing it back to Denny Hamlin on lap 456
- Lap 448: Caution due to Aric Alimroa's accident; green flag racing resumed on Lap 455
- Lap 456: Denny Hamlin took over the lead from Jimmie Johnson before losing it back to Jimmie Johnson on lap 485
- Lap 468: Caution due to a 3-car accident; green flag racing resumed on Lap 471
- Lap 474: Caution due to a Bobby Labonte and Martin Truex, Jr's accident; green flag racing resumed on lap 477
- Lap 485: Jimmie Johnson took over the lead from Denny Hamlin
- Finish: Jimmie Johnson was officially declared the winner of the event.

== Standings after the race ==
Pos	Driver	Points
1	Jeff Gordon	959
2	Clint Bowyer	870
3	Kurt Busch	827
4	Jimmie Johnson	817
5	Denny Hamlin	811

Previous race: 2009 Food City 500	Sprint Cup Series; 2009 season	Next race: 2009 Samsung 500
