= Michael Waltrip Racing =

Former NASCAR team

Michael Waltrip Racing Holdings LLC
- Owner(s): Michael Waltrip; Robert Kauffman
- Base: Cornelius, North Carolina
- Series: Sprint Cup Series; Nationwide Series; Craftsman Truck Series; K&N Pro Series East
- Race drivers: Michael Waltrip; Clint Bowyer; David Ragan; Martin Truex Jr. Mark Martin; Dale Jarrett; Brian Vickers; David Reutimann; Michael McDowell; Trevor Bayne; Ryan Truex; Travis Pastrana; Josh Wise
- Manufacturer: Chevrolet; Ford; Dodge; Toyota
- Opened: 1994
- Closed: 2015

Career
- Debut: Sprint Cup Series: 2002 Aaron's 499 (Talladega); Nationwide Series: 1994 Goody's 250 (Bristol); Craftsman Truck Series: 1996 Carquest 420K (Las Vegas)
- Latest race: Sprint Cup Series: 2015 Ford EcoBoost 400 (Homestead); Nationwide Series: 2009 Ford 300 (Homestead); Craftsman Truck Series: 2003 Advance Auto Parts 200 (Martinsville)
- Races competed: Total: 1,142; Sprint Cup Series: 779; Nationwide Series: 355; Craftsman Truck Series: 8
- Drivers' Championships: Total: 0 Sprint Cup Series: 0 Nationwide Series: 0 Craftsman Truck Series: 0
- Race victories: Total: 12; Sprint Cup Series: 7 Nationwide Series: 5 Craftsman Truck Series: 0
- Pole positions: Total: 24; Sprint Cup Series: 14; Nationwide Series: 10; Craftsman Truck Series: 0

Michael Waltrip Racing Holdings LLC, doing business as Michael Waltrip Racing ("MWR"), was an American professional stock car racing team that last competed full-time in the NASCAR Sprint Cup Series. The company was as a 50–50 partnership between Robert Kauffman, the founder and managing partner of Fortress Investment Group, and two-time Daytona 500 winner Michael Waltrip, who first established the team in 1996 in the Busch Series (now O'Reilly Auto Parts Series). The team was the first full-time three-car team to field Toyota Camrys when Toyota entered the Sprint Cup racing fold in 2007, before being joined by Joe Gibbs Racing in 2008. MWR was also the last original Toyota team in the Sprint Cup Series to still be in operation, as Bill Davis Racing and Red Bull Racing Team had both ceased operations in the preceding years.

The team last fielded the No. 15 Toyota Camry for Clint Bowyer and the No. 55 Camry for David Ragan. Brian Vickers would normally drive the No. 55, but repeated health problems including blood clotting forced him out for much of 2015. Development driver Brett Moffitt and team owner Waltrip also competed in the car.

== History ==
Michael Waltrip Racing began racing in the Winston Cup Series in 2002, making its debut at the 2002 Aaron's 499. The car was the No. 98 Aaron's Chevrolet Monte Carlo driven by Kenny Wallace. Wallace qualified 27th and finished 21st. Following that first race, Waltrip sold the No. 98 and its owner points to Innovative Motorsports.

After that, MWR fielded one Cup Series car, the No. 00, on an intermittent basis through 2005. In 2006, MWR, in partnership with Bill Davis Racing, added a second car, Waltrip's No. 55, but neither car had manufacturer support due to DaimlerChrysler suing BDR for breach of contract.

In 2006, MWR signed an agreement with Toyota to field multiple Toyota Camrys in the Nextel Cup Series for 2007. Waltrip was then able to add a third car driven by Dale Jarrett to his team for 2007, along with new sponsors.

However, the MWR team had a disastrous season. In February, Waltrip's teams were disallowed from their starting spots in the Daytona 500 due to an illegal fuel additive. The team members each faced a $100,000 fine and many team members were suspended. Though they backed up their qualifications by using back-up cars they suffered a terrible year. The team was unable to recover, failing to qualify for many events and losing sponsors such as Burger King and Domino's Pizza. Waltrip partnered with British-American billionaire Rob Kauffman as a 50% co-owner in order to fix the problem.

After the season, an ugly controversy emerged with Jack Roush of Roush Fenway Racing, who accused MWR of stealing one of his team's sway bars after a September 2007 race. While Waltrip and some other drivers, such as Jeff Gordon, argued that parts are often inadvertently swapped during post-race inspection, Roush held a lengthy news conference in March 2008 to accuse "the non-descript Toyota team" (MWR) of deliberately stealing the bar and threatened legal action. However, Roush, who had previously accused Toyota teams of being "ankle-biting Chihuahuas" and brought up Pearl Harbor in his effort to keep Toyota out of NASCAR, did not pursue such a lawsuit as NASCAR declared that the Toyota teams did nothing wrong and that Roush's ideas against Toyota were ridiculous.

For 2008, MWR once again added Aaron's as a sponsor and ran competitively, but again managed only one pole and just one top-5 finish, and UPS withdrew as a sponsor after Jarrett retired and transferred its sponsorship to MWR's archrivals Roush Fenway. In 2009, MWR was forced to form a technical alliance with JTG Daugherty Racing to have sponsorship for its third car. However, during this season, MWR finally achieved success as a Sprint Cup team, including winning a race and placing two cars in the top six two weeks later. Both of those cars ended up in the top 20 for the year. For 2010, MWR added Martin Truex Jr. as a full-time Sprint Cup driver. Michael Waltrip continued as a part-time driver, while also adding on talent such as former RCR crew chief Scott Miller, and hiring drivers Mark Martin, Clint Bowyer, and Brian Vickers.

In 2013, controversy arose in the Federated Auto Parts 400. Clint Bowyer spun out with seven laps to go, forcing a caution. Rumors abounded postrace that Bowyer had deliberately forced a caution to help Truex into the Chase. Truex was just ahead of Ryan Newman for the final Chase wildcard slot. They gained even further credence when it was revealed the third MWR driver, Brian Vickers, had pitted after the restart on orders from general manager Ty Norris, who was serving as his spotter. As it turned out, by the time Newman was able to pit, he lost several spots and ultimately finished third, tying him with Truex in points. However, Truex got the final wildcard spot in the Chase via a tiebreaker. An investigation was unable to turn up conclusive evidence that Bowyer's spin was deliberate, but did find that Norris had tried to manipulate the race and Chase standings by having Vickers pit. As a result, NASCAR issued some of the stiffest penalties imposed on a team in its history. It fined MWR a record $300,000 and docked all three MWR teams 50 driver/owner points prior to points being reset for the Chase. The point penalty had the effect of ejecting Truex from the Chase and putting Newman in as the last wild card. Gordon would be put in as the 13th entrant after NASCAR was unable to eject Joey Logano from the Chase due to his involvement in another race manipulation scheme that same race. Norris was suspended indefinitely, while crew chiefs Brian Pattie, Scott Miler and Chad Johnston were placed on probation until December 31. To make matters worse NAPA Auto Parts, who had sponsored Waltrip in both his driving and ownership roles since 2001, elected to end its business relationship with MWR following the incident, a decision that forced Waltrip to release Truex from his contract. On August 19, 2015, co-owner Rob Kauffman announced that MWR would cease full-time racing after 2015. Much of the MWR equipment and several employees went to BK Racing for 2016. They also sold their two charters to Stewart–Haas Racing and Joe Gibbs Racing, which currently use them as the No. 41 and No. 19, respectively.

After shutting down, MWR was embroiled in an ugly lawsuit with former tire changer Brandon Hopkins who sued the team for wrongful firing, defamation, and interference with finding work at another team. MWR counterclaimed that Hopkins stole pit road guns which was the cause of the firing. The suit was settled out of court in November, 2017.

== Sprint Cup Series ==
=== Car No. 00 history ===
Part Time (2002–2006)

The first race for the No. 00 was at the Tropicana 400, with Jerry Nadeau driving. Nadeau qualified 34th but finished 37th after suffering a steering failure. MWR attempted another race that season, the NAPA 500 with Buckshot Jones driving with a sponsorship from Charter Pipeline, but he failed to qualify due to rain. Jones ran the EA Sports 500 the following season, where he started 16th and led 19 laps before being relegated to 40th due to a crash. He attempted Atlanta again, but failed to qualify. Mike Skinner closed out the year for MWR at the Ford 400, qualifying 17th, but finishing 39th after a wreck.

In 2004, Kenny Wallace returned to MWR in the No. 00. Running four races for the team, his best finish was a 22nd at Homestead-Miami Speedway. Wallace ran two races in 2005, finishing 27th at Darlington Raceway. Johnny Benson ran a pair of races that season as well, but did not finish any higher than 42nd. David Reutimann, who drove for Waltrip's brother Darrell in the Craftsman Truck Series, made his Cup debut at Lowe's Motor Speedway that season, qualifying 26th and finishing 22nd. In 2006, the No. 00 ran under two separate entries. The first ran with listed owners Mike and Bonnie Anderson under the name MBA Racing. It campaigned Ford Fusions with Hermie Sadler driving. He made only three starts, with his best finish 40th at the Daytona 500. The other was the MWR car with Waltrip as the listed owner. Bill Elliott drove the Monte Carlo in five races in 2006 with a sponsorship from Burger King.

David Reutimann (2007–2008)

David Reutimann was tapped to drive the No. 00 Toyota Camry in 2007, with full-time primary sponsorships from Burger King and Domino's Pizza. He competed for the Rookie of the Year title as well as the Nextel Cup championship. However, the team struggled to qualify for races, as did other Toyota teams, making only 26 of 36 races in the season. Reutimann experienced one of the hardest crashes ever recorded at the 2007 Auto Club 500 at California Speedway. Because of the struggles, the team finished 39th in points and had a best finish of 13th. Burger King and Domino's then pulled their sponsorship for 2008.

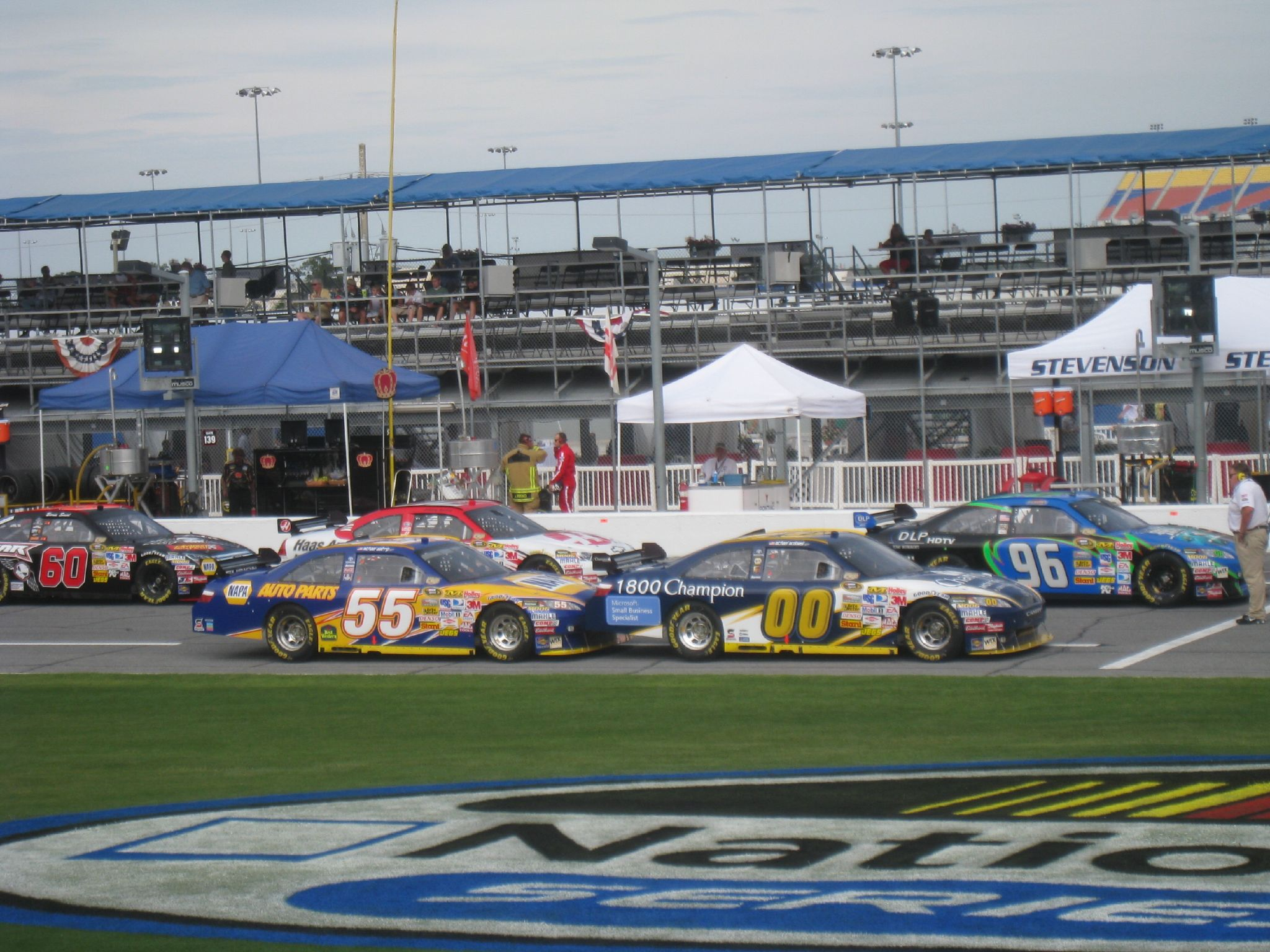
Michael Waltrip's No. 55 and Michael McDowell's No. 00 on pit road at Daytona in July 2008

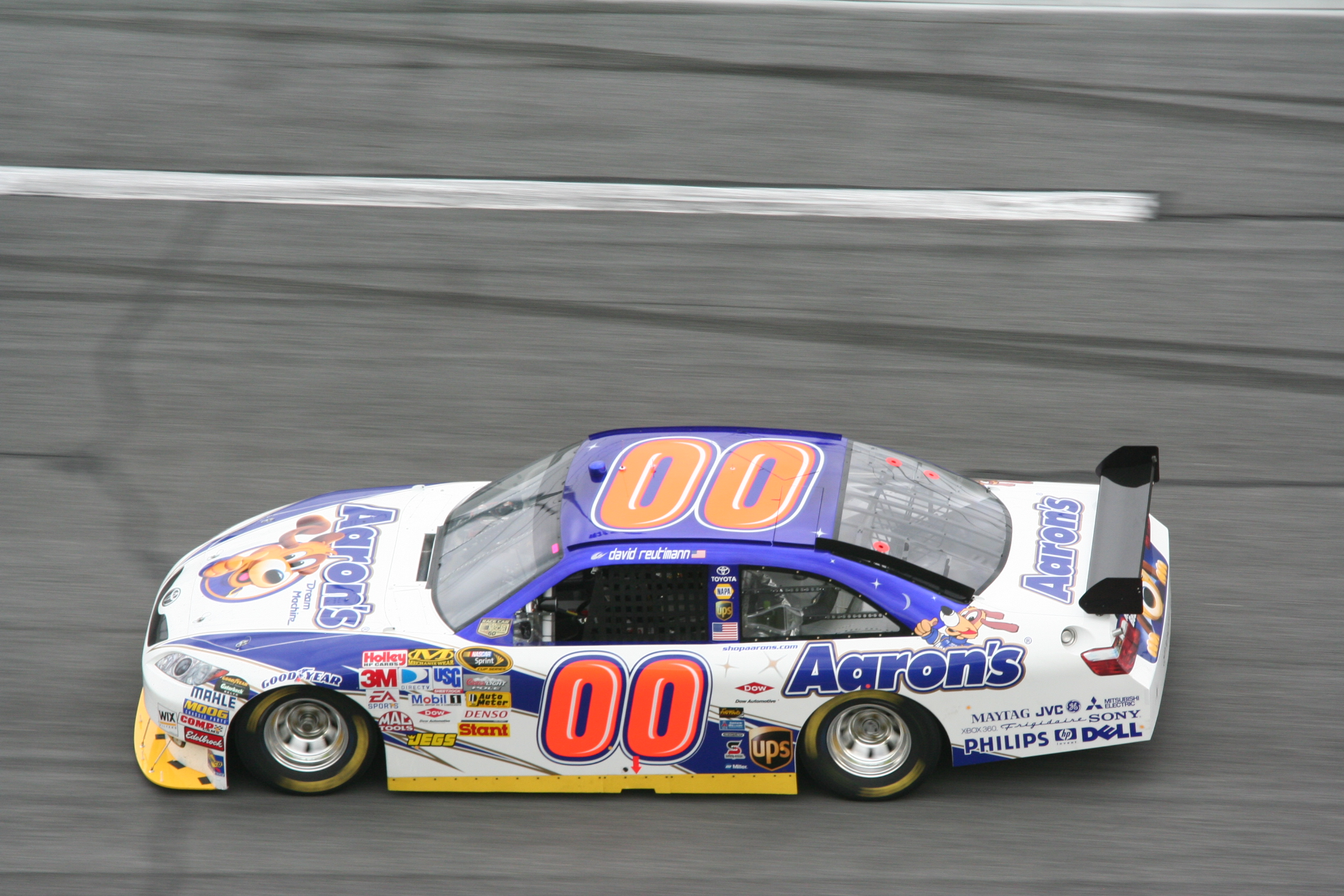
David Reutimann's No. 00 Toyota Camry at Daytona in 2008.

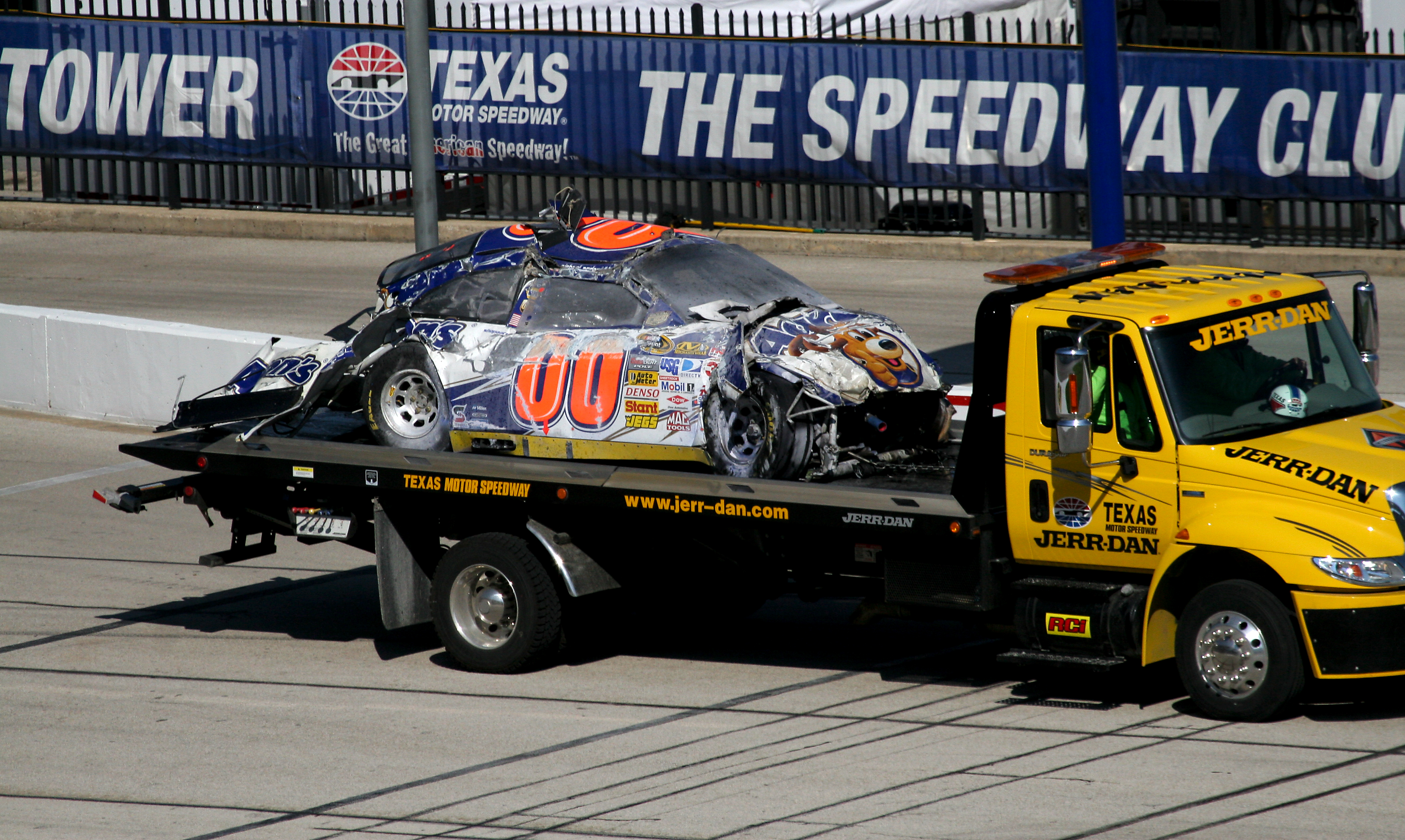
Michael McDowell's wrecked race car at Texas in 2008.

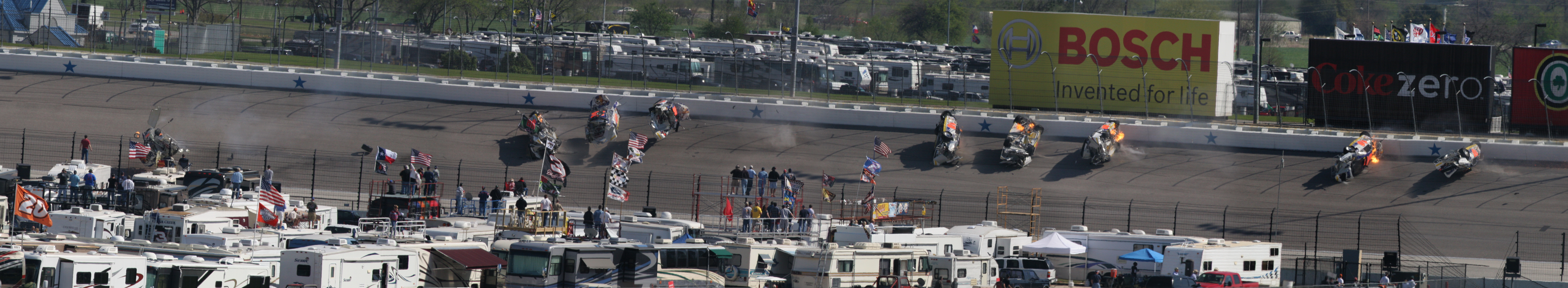
Panorama of Michael McDowell's crash in sequence at Texas Motor Speedway

Michael McDowell (2008)

Reutimann opened 2008 in the No. 00 with backing from Aaron's. After the first five races Reutimann moved to MWR's No. 44 UPS Toyota and Michael McDowell took over the No. 00. However, McDowell struggled to keep the car in the Top 35 in owner points, which is necessary for automatic qualification into each race, and was replaced near the end of the season by Mike Skinner in an effort to reclaim a Top 35 spot. In October 2008, MWR transferred its third team to the No. 47 Toyota of JTG Daugherty Racing, driven by Marcos Ambrose, and discontinued the No. 00 team for the balance of the season.

David Reutimann (2009–2011)

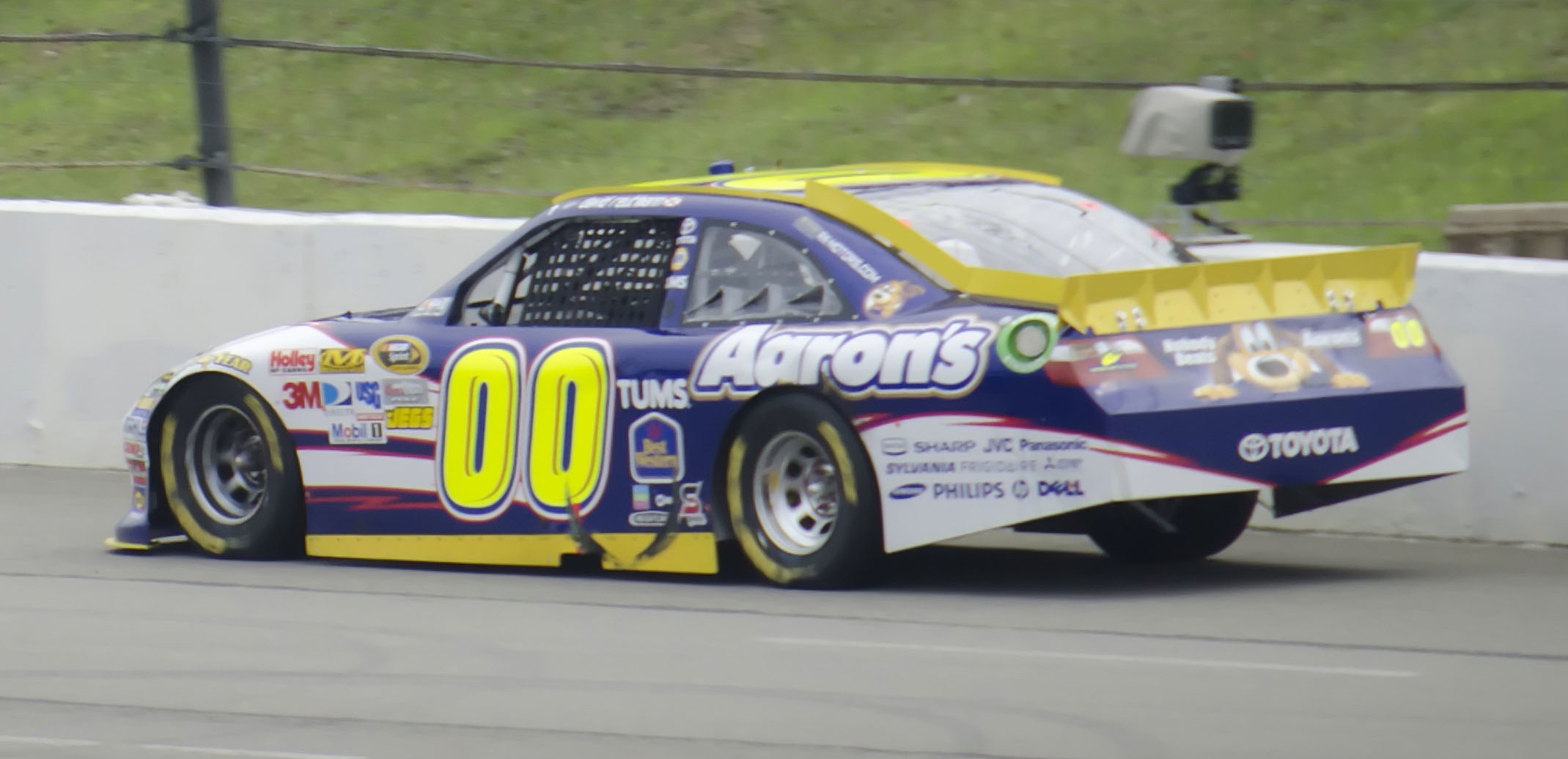
David Reutimann in the No. 00 car at Pocono Raceway in 2011

In 2009, the No. 00 was once again driven by Reutimann with an Aaron's sponsorship for the entire 2009 season. This became Reutimann and MWR's breakthrough season, as Reutimann won a rain-shortened Coca-Cola 600 on May 25, 2009, giving Michael Waltrip Racing its first victory in a Sprint Cup race, which was considered vindication for a team that had struggled for years. After a strong start to the season, Reutimann ranked among the Top 12 drivers (who qualify for the Chase for the Sprint Cup) after finishing third at the Pocono 500 in race No. 14. He was caught by an early wreck at Daytona in race No. 18 that dropped him to 14th, however, and he narrowly finished outside the Chase. He also won his second pole at Texas Motor Speedway in April and his third at Dover in the race after his first victory.

For 2010, Reutimann and the No. 00 team returned with minimal changes. On July 10, they won the LifeLock.com 400 at Chicagoland Speedway, for MWR's 2nd Sprint Cup win. On November 4, 2011, MWR announced that Reutimann would not return as driver of the No. 00 for 2012.

For 2012, the No. 00 was renumbered to 55 in honor of Aaron's founding in 1955.

==== Car No. 00 results ====
Year	Driver	No.	Make	1	2	3	4	5	6	7	8	9	10	11	12	13	14	15	16	17	18	19	20	21	22	23	24	25	26	27	28	29	30	31	32	33	34	35	36	Owners	Pts
2002	Jerry Nadeau	00	Chevy	DAY	CAR	LVS	ATL	DAR	BRI	TEX	MAR	TAL	CAL	RCH	CLT	DOV	POC	MCH	SON	DAY	CHI; 37	NHA	POC	IND	GLN	MCH	BRI	DAR	RCH	NHA	DOV	KAN	TAL	CLT	MAR					82nd	37
2002	Buckshot Jones	00	Chevy																																	ATL; DNQ	CAR	PHO	HOM	82nd	37
2003	Buckshot Jones	00	Chevy	DAY	CAR	LVS	ATL	DAR	BRI	TEX	TAL	MAR	CAL	RCH	CLT	DOV	POC	MCH	SON	DAY	CHI	NHA	POC	IND	GLN	MCH	BRI	DAR	RCH	NHA	DOV	TAL; 40	KAN	CLT	MAR	ATL; DNQ	PHO	CAR		49th	559
2003	Mike Skinner	00	Chevy																																				HOM; 39	49th	559
2004	Kenny Wallace	00	Chevy	DAY	CAR	LVS	ATL	DAR	BRI	TEX	MAR	TAL; 37	CAL	RCH	CLT	DOV	POC	MCH	SON	DAY; DNQ	CHI	NHA	POC	IND; 34	GLN	MCH; DNQ	BRI; 25	CAL	RCH	NHA	DOV	TAL	KAN	CLT; DNQ	MAR	ATL; DNQ	PHO	DAR	HOM; 22	50th	365
2005	Kenny Wallace	00	Chevy	DAY; 40	CAL	LVS	ATL	BRI	MAR	TEX	PHO	TAL; DNQ	DAR; 27	RCH	CLT	DOV	POC	MCH	SON	DAY	CHI	NHA	POC	IND; DNQ	GLN															52nd	376
2005	Johnny Benson	00	Chevy																							MCH; 42	BRI; 43	CAL	RCH	NHA	DOV	TAL	KAN							52nd	376
2005	David Reutimann	00	Chevy																															CLT; 22	MAR	ATL	TEX	PHO	HOM	52nd	376
2006	Bill Elliott	00	Chevy	DAY	CAL	LVS	ATL	BRI	MAR	TEX	PHO	TAL	RCH	DAR	CLT	DOV	POC	MCH	SON	DAY	CHI; 35	NHA; 32	POC	IND; 22	GLN	MCH	BRI	CAL; 42	RCH	NHA	DOV	KAN	TAL	CLT	MAR	ATL	TEX	PHO	HOM; 25	47th	465
2007	David Reutimann	00	Toyota	DAY; 40	CAL; 33	LVS; DNQ	ATL; 40	BRI; DNQ	MAR; 33	TEX; DNQ	PHO; 32	TAL; 32	RCH; 29	DAR; 33	CLT; DNQ	DOV; DNQ	POC; 38	MCH; 15		NHA; 38	DAY; 26	CHI; 43	IND; 38	POC; 41		MCH; 23	BRI; DNQ	CAL; 32	RCH; 13	NHA; 26	DOV; 18	KAN; 31	TAL; 22	CLT; 29	MAR; 17	ATL; DNQ	TEX; 43	PHO; DNQ	HOM; 25	39th	2287
2007	P. J. Jones	00	Toyota																SON; 12						GLN; 25															39th	2287
2008	David Reutimann	00	Toyota	DAY; 18	CAL; 23	LVS; 37	ATL; 20	BRI; 20																																36th	2992
2008	Michael McDowell	00	Toyota						MAR; 26	TEX; 33	PHO; 34	TAL; 26	RCH; 40	DAR; 28	CLT; 32	DOV; 30	POC; 27	MCH; 37	SON; 21	NHA; 42	DAY; 25	CHI; 43	IND; 34	POC; 24	GLN; 25				RCH; 20	NHA; 27	DOV; 29	KAN; DNQ								36th	2992
2008	Mike Skinner	00	Toyota																							MCH; 35	BRI; 28	CAL; 35												36th	2992
2008	Kenny Wallace	00	Toyota																														TAL; 12							36th	2992
2008	A. J. Allmendinger	00	Toyota																															CLT; 43						36th	2992
2008	Mike Bliss	00	Toyota																																MAR; 39					36th	2992
2008	Marcos Ambrose	47	Toyota																																	ATL; 29	TEX; 21	PHO; 18	HOM; 42	36th	2992
2009	David Reutimann	00	Toyota	DAY; 12	CAL; 14	LVS; 4	ATL; 32	BRI; 12	MAR; 20	TEX; 11	PHO; 8	TAL; 26	RCH; 28	DAR; 29	CLT; 1	DOV; 18	POC; 3	MCH; 19	SON; 31	NHA; 4	DAY; 36	CHI; 12	IND; 8	POC; 29	GLN; 25	MCH; 9	BRI; 17	ATL; 4	RCH; 20	NHA; 12	DOV; 21	KAN; 8	CAL; 18	CLT; 15	MAR; 16	TAL; 26	TEX; 16	PHO; 10	HOM; 15	16th	4221
2010	David Reutimann	00	Toyota	DAY; 5	CAL; 15	LVS; 13	ATL; 40	BRI; 38	MAR; 28	PHO; 20	TEX; 37	TAL; 14	RCH; 15	DAR; 11	DOV; 5	CLT; 5	POC; 15	MCH; 18	SON; 20	NHA; 15	DAY; 11	CHI; 1	IND; 28	POC; 17	GLN; 23	MCH; 16	BRI; 2	ATL; 16	RCH; 19	NHA; 7	DOV; 35	KAN; 35	CAL; 10	CLT; 9	MAR; 27	TAL; 4	TEX; 15	PHO; 26	HOM; 38	18th	4024
2011	David Reutimann	00	Toyota	DAY; 30	PHO; 29	LVS; 13	BRI; 30	CAL; 19	MAR; 15	TEX; 29	TAL; 14	RCH; 31	DAR; 16	DOV; 15	CLT; 9	KAN; 22	POC; 13	MCH; 35	SON; 24	DAY; 25	KEN; 2	NHA; 19	IND; 36	POC; 24	GLN; 29	MCH; 18	BRI; 36	ATL; 31	RCH; 26	CHI; 32	NHA; 28	DOV; 13	KAN; 35	CLT; 26	TAL; 13	MAR; 20	TEX; 22	PHO; 7	HOM; 18	28th	757

=== Car No. 15 history ===
Part Time (2010–2011)

The 15 began as the No. 51 because Michael Waltrip's move away from full-time driving, the team began fielding a fourth car for him in selected races in 2010. Instead of continuing to use the No. 55, Waltrip decided to go with the No. 51, which is the inverse of the No. 15, which is the car that Waltrip drove for DEI to four victories at Daytona and Talladega in the early 2000s. Waltrip first drove the No. 51 for the 2010 Daytona Speedweeks, and he became the final qualifier in the 2010 Daytona 500 despite wrecking in the qualifying race.

In 2011, the car was renumbered as the No. 15, with Waltrip driving the car at Daytona and Talladega. Waltrip also attempted to qualify for the first ever Cup race at Kentucky (Waltrip's home track), but qualifying was rained out and the No. 15 was too low in points to make the field.

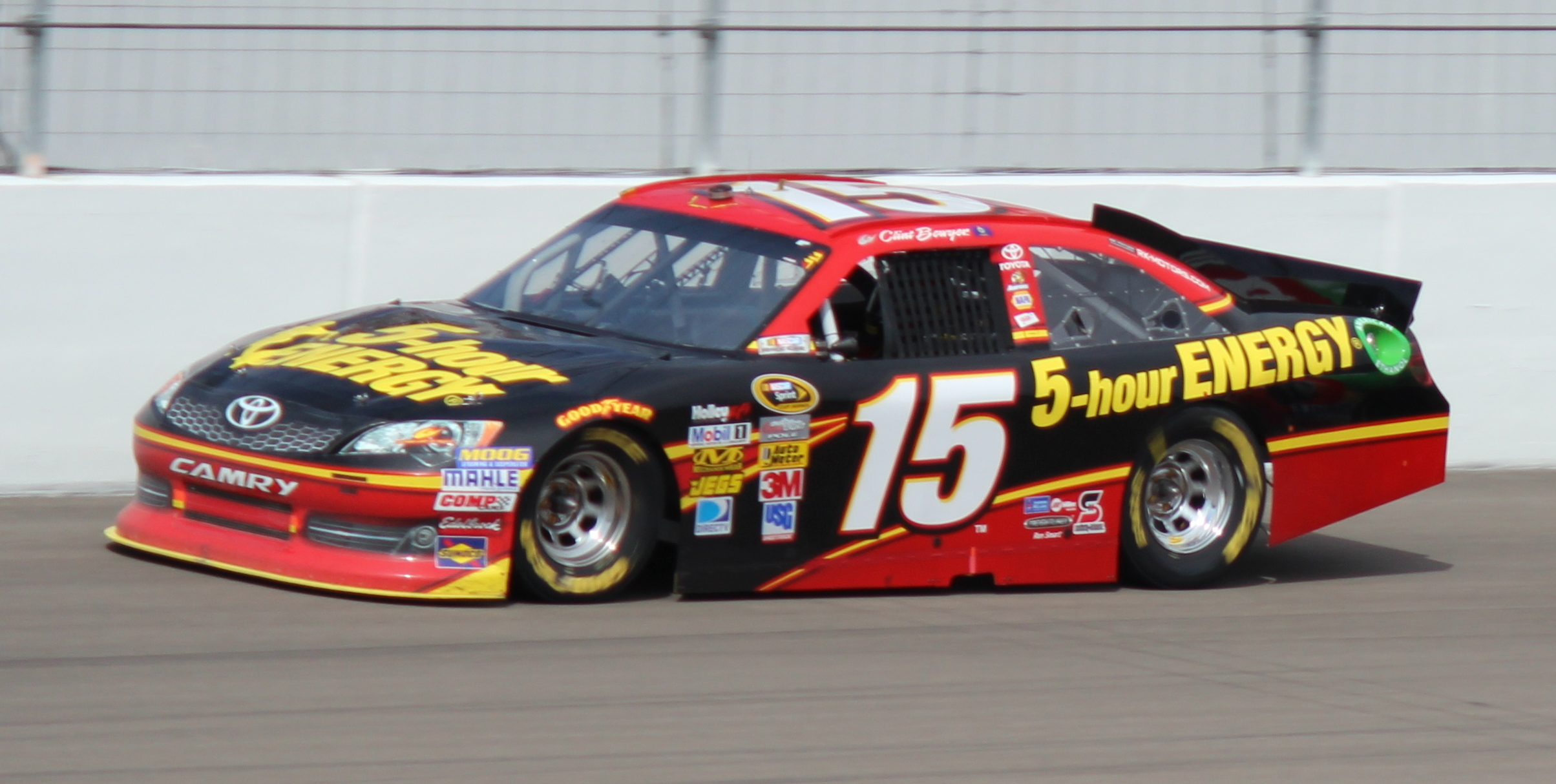
Clint Bowyer's No. 15 during the 2012 Kobalt Tools 400.

Clint Bowyer (2012–2015)

The No. 15 ran full-time in the Sprint Cup in 2012 as Clint Bowyer joined the team from Richard Childress Racing. Bowyer ran with 5-Hour Energy as his sponsor. In June 2012, Bowyer won at Sonoma. He won again at Richmond International Raceway in September 2012 for MWR's fourth win, also becoming the first MWR driver to qualify for the Chase for the Sprint Cup. Bowyer would win for the third time in 2012 at Charlotte in October, and ended up finishing second in the points standings after a mechanical failure on Jimmie Johnson's car in the final race.

Bowyer and MWR struggled more to find speed in both 2014 and 2015, failing to win any races nor contend for a championship. After the 2015 season, the team shut down and Bowyer, who was still under contract for an additional year, moved to HScott Motorsports with the sponsorship and number following him there.

==== Car No. 15 results ====
Year	Driver	No.	Make	1	2	3	4	5	6	7	8	9	10	11	12	13	14	15	16	17	18	19	20	21	22	23	24	25	26	27	28	29	30	31	32	33	34	35	36	Owners	Pts
2010	Michael Waltrip	51	Toyota	DAY; 18	CAL	LVS	ATL	BRI	MAR	PHO	TEX	TAL	RCH	DAR	DOV	CLT	POC	MCH	SON	NHA	DAY	CHI	IND	POC	GLN	MCH	BRI	ATL	RCH	NHA	DOV	KAN	CAR	CLT	MAR	TAL	TEX	PHO	HOM	55th	284
2011	Michael Waltrip	15	Toyota	DAY; 40	PHO	LVS	BRI	CAL	MAR	TEX	TAL; 28	RCH	DAR	DOV	CLT	KAN	POC	MCH	SON	DAY	KEN; DNQ	NHA	IND	POC	GLN	MCH	BRI	ATL	RCH	CHI	NHA	DOV	KAN	CLT	TAL; 9	MAR	TEX	PHO	HOM	42nd	56
2012	Clint Bowyer	15	Toyota	DAY; 11	PHO; 30	LVS; 6	BRI; 4	CAL; 13	MAR; 10	TEX; 17	KAN; 36	RCH; 7	TAL; 6	DAR; 11	CLT; 14	DOV; 6	POC; 7	MCH; 8	SON; 1*	KEN; 16	DAY; 29	NHA; 3	IND; 15	POC; 8	GLN; 4	MCH; 7	BRI; 7	ATL; 27	RCH; 1	CHI; 10	NHA; 4	DOV; 9	TAL; 23	CLT; 1	KAN; 6	MAR; 5	TEX; 6	PHO; 28	HOM; 2	2nd	2361
2013	Clint Bowyer	15	Toyota	DAY; 11	PHO; 6	LVS; 27	BRI; 5	CAL; 35	MAR; 2	TEX; 15	KAN; 5	RCH; 2	TAL; 18	DAR; 11	CLT; 8	DOV; 6	POC; 15	MCH; 7	SON; 5	KEN; 3	DAY; 4	NHA; 13	IND; 20	POC; 14	GLN; 6	MCH; 5	BRI; 14	ATL; 39	RCH; 25	CHI; 9	NHA; 17	DOV; 10	KAN; 14	CLT; 11	TAL; 10	MAR; 3	TEX; 10	PHO; 20	HOM; 5	7th	2336
2014	Clint Bowyer	15	Toyota	DAY; 42	PHO; 13	LVS; 23	BRI; 15	CAL; 16	MAR; 9	TEX; 8	DAR; 12	RCH; 43	TAL; 3	KAN; 23	CLT; 17	DOV; 4	POC; 11	MCH; 10	SON; 10	KEN; 23	DAY; 9	NHA; 6	IND; 16	POC; 4	GLN; 27	MCH; 6	BRI; 17	ATL; 38	RCH; 3	CHI; 39	NHA; 14	DOV; 9	KAN; 19	CLT; 43	TAL; 3	MAR; 7	TEX; 28	PHO; 40	HOM; 8	19th	979
2015	Clint Bowyer	15	Toyota	DAY; 7	ATL; 24	LVS; 21	PHO; 24	CAL; 30	MAR; 13	TEX; 22	BRI; 12	RCH; 9	TAL; 30	KAN; 21	CLT; 20	DOV; 9	POC; 22	MCH; 10	SON; 3	DAY; 10	KEN; 19	NHA; 34	IND; 6	POC; 8	GLN; 6	MCH; 41	BRI; 5	DAR; 17	RCH; 10	CHI; 19	NHA; 26	DOV; 14	CLT; 11	KAN; 40	TAL; 8	MAR; 43	TEX; 15	PHO; 23	HOM; 43	16th	2175

=== Car No. 44 history ===
Dale Jarrett (2007–2008)

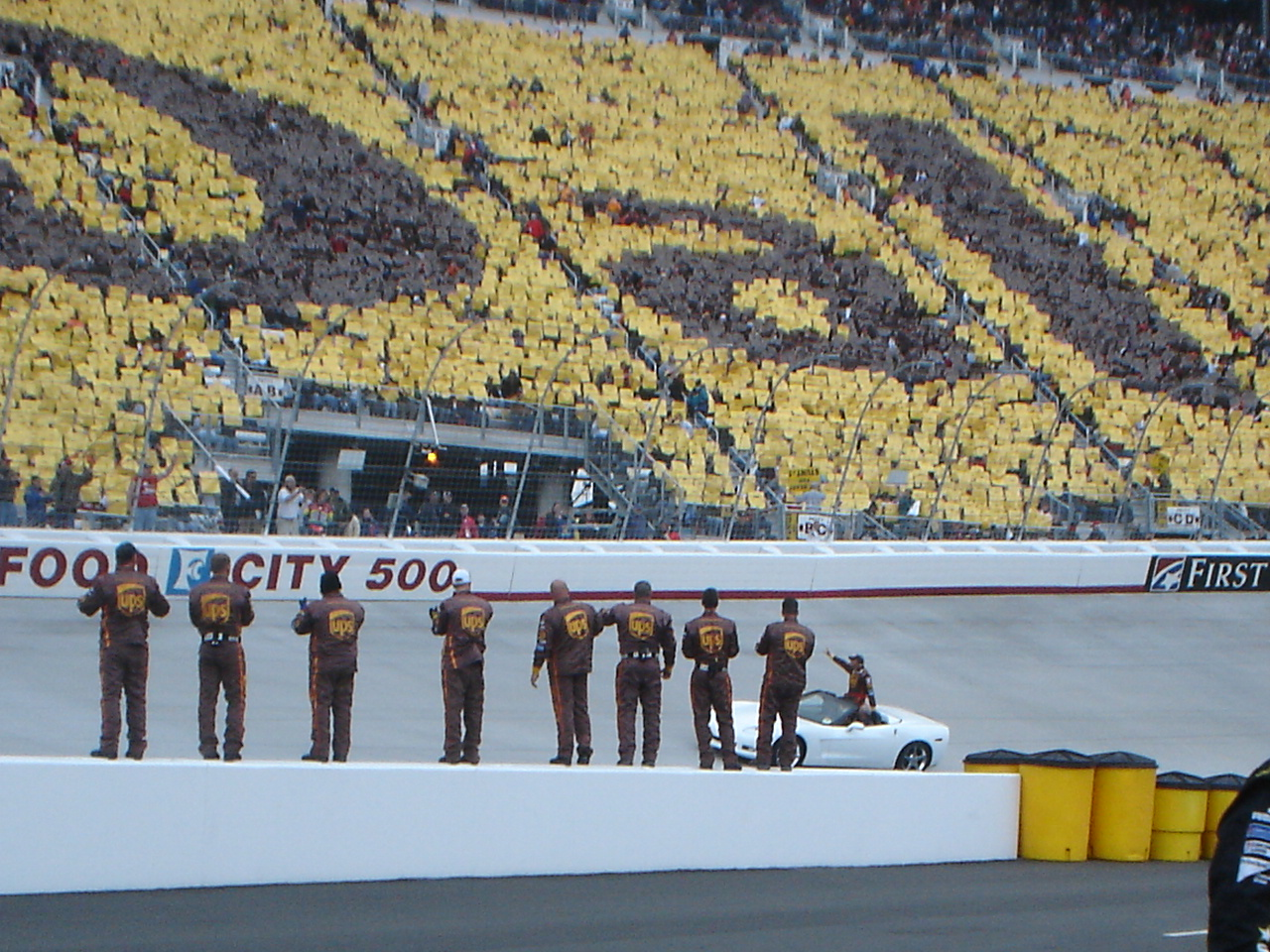
Dale Jarrett on a parade lap before his final points race as fans and crew applaud him

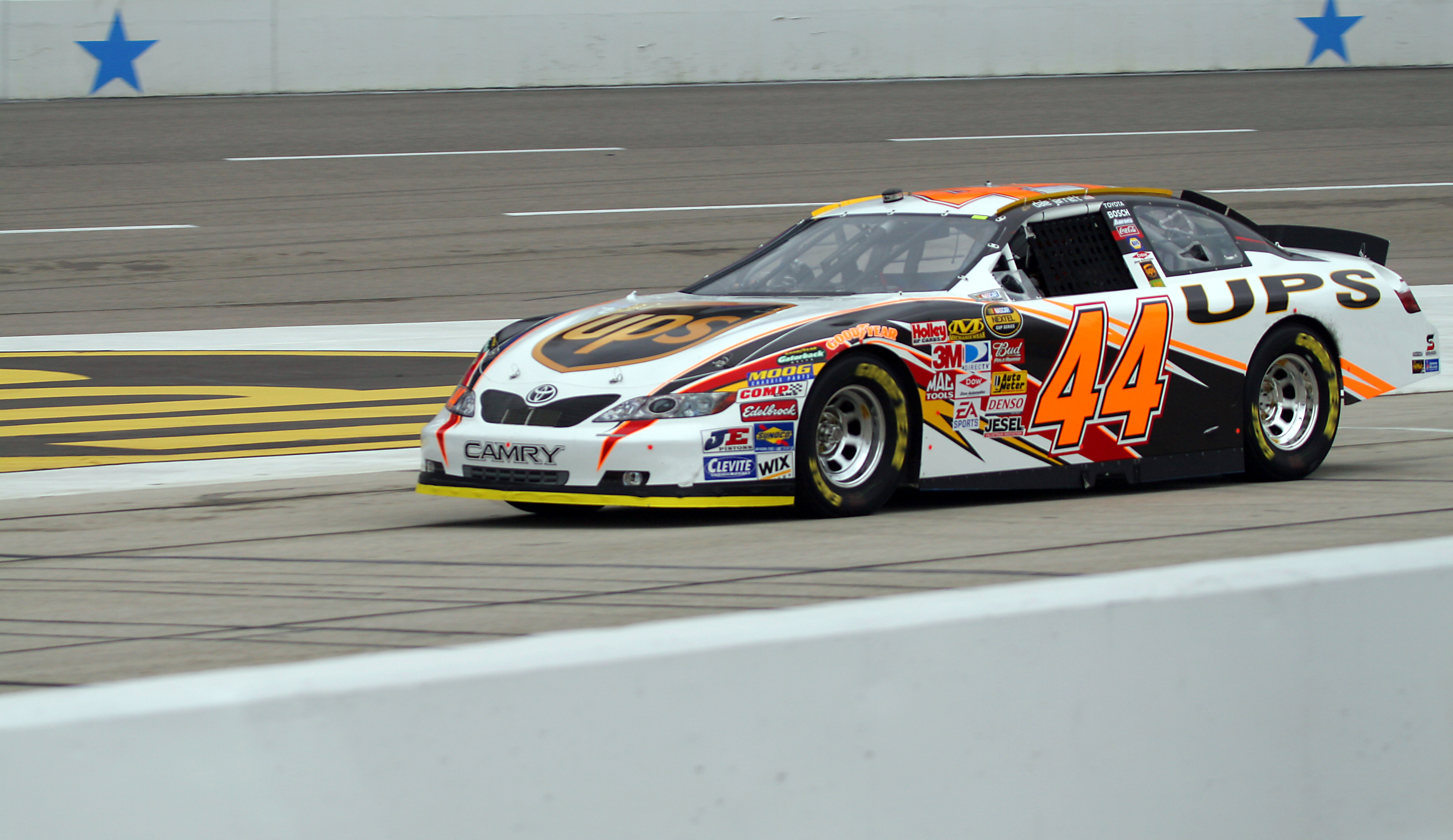
Dale Jarrett at Texas in 2007.

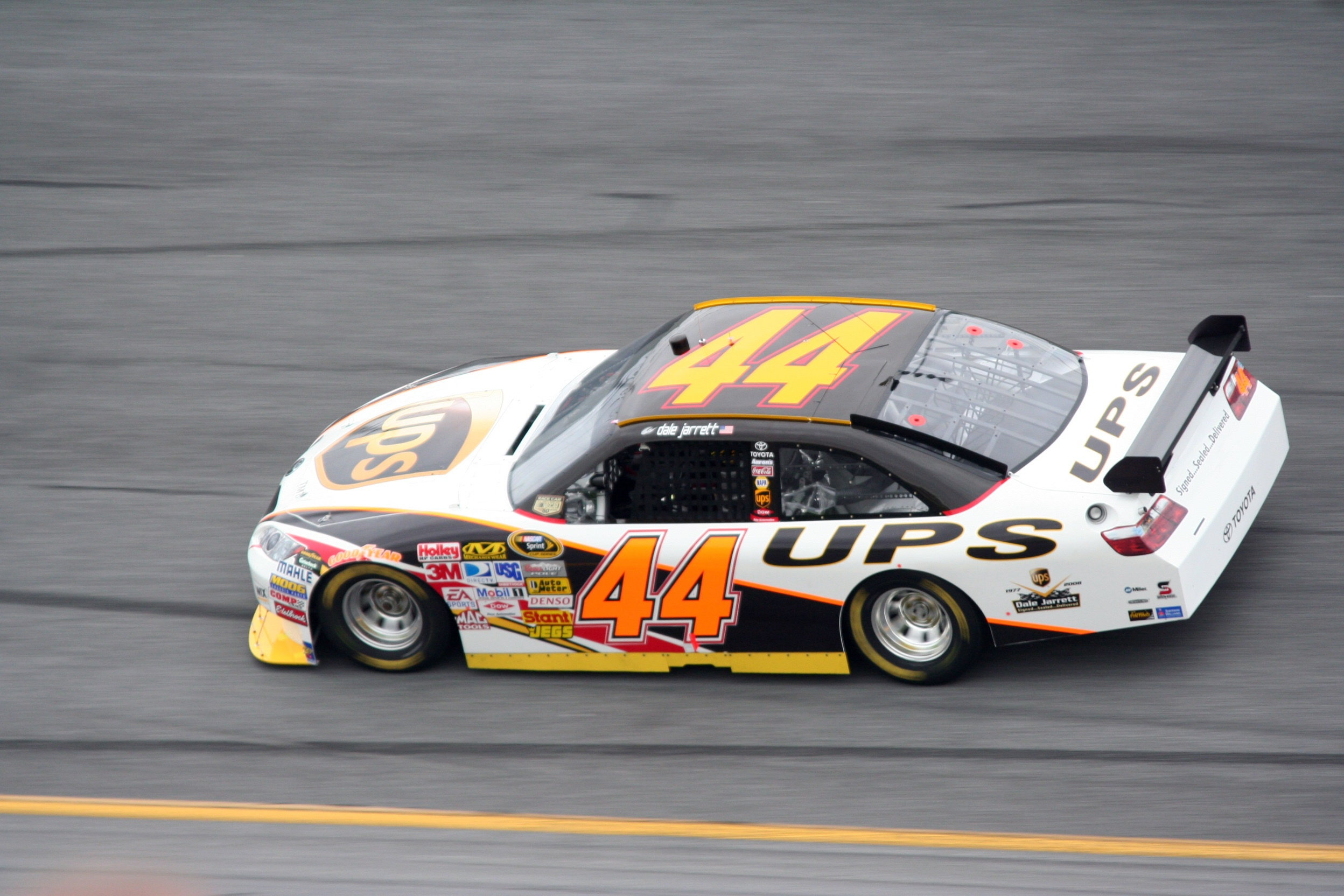
Dale Jarrett in his final season in 2008.

1999 series champion Dale Jarrett and his sponsor UPS moved over from Robert Yates Racing's No. 88 car to MWR's No. 44 car for the full season. Jarrett started the 2007 NASCAR Nextel Cup season on a high note as he drew pole position for the annual exhibition race, the Budweiser Shootout, at the Daytona International Speedway. He finished 18th out of 21 cars. Since Jarrett's team was a brand new team and had no owner points, and due to a rule change, he was eligible to use the Past Champion's Provisional five times as his 1999 championship was the most recent among past champions who were driving for teams not in the top 35 in owner points; prior to the rule change the use of a Past Champion's Provisional was not limited.

Jarrett was forced to use all five of his provisionals at the start of the season, starting at Daytona mainly because Michael Waltrip Racing was penalized by NASCAR for an illegal fuel additive during Speedweeks and the penalties knocked Jarrett, Michael Waltrip and David Reutimann out of the top 35 in owner points-the safety net for qualifying regardless of rain and cancellations of qualifying.

Jarrett started 43rd in the Daytona 500 and finished 22nd. Jarrett used his last champion's provisional at the Spring Talladega race, Aaron's 499. For the rest of 2007, Jarrett had to get into that weekend's race on time. Like the other two teams, Jarrett struggled, failing to qualify for twelve races and not scoring a single pole or top 10 finish, leading to a dismal 41st-place points finish.

During an interview on Speed, Jarrett said after his contract is up with MWR (which was expected to be in the 2009 season), he would retire, but the timetable was pushed up in October 2007 prior to the 2007 Bank of America 500. Jarrett retired from points racing after the 2008 Food City 500, turning the No. 44 Toyota ride to David Reutimann. His final race was the All-Star race in May 2008.

In 2008, Jarrett planned to run the first five races and the All Star Race before retiring from Sprint Cup Series competition. However, Jarrett was not guaranteed to start the first five races using the champion's provisional as he had the year before as Kurt Busch, the 2004 champion, had his team's owner points transferred to his teammate Sam Hornish Jr. and would be first to receive it. In his abbreviated final season, Jarrett had a best finish of 16th in the Daytona 500 but no finish higher than 26th otherwise.

David Reutimann (2008)

For the rest of the 2008 season, David Reutimann moved over from the 00 Aaron's Dream Machine to pilot the 44 car. David had four top 10s in his entire season, including a pole at the season finale Ford 400.

==== Car No. 44 results ====
Year	Driver	No.	Make	1	2	3	4	5	6	7	8	9	10	11	12	13	14	15	16	17	18	19	20	21	22	23	24	25	26	27	28	29	30	31	32	33	34	35	36	Owners	Pts
2007	Dale Jarrett	44	Toyota	DAY; 22	CAL; 32	LVS; 33	ATL; 36	BRI; 42	MAR; 28	TEX; 30	PHO; 29	TAL; 40	RCH; DNQ	DAR; DNQ	CLT; 40	DOV; 43	POC; DNQ	MCH; DNQ	SON; 26	NHA; DNQ	DAY; 27	CHI; DNQ	IND; DNQ	POC; 42	GLN; 29	MCH; DNQ	BRI; 34	CAL; DNQ	RCH; 31	NHA; DNQ	DOV; 41	KAN; 26	TAL; 41	CLT; DNQ	MAR; 30	ATL; 19	TEX; 38	PHO; DNQ	HOM; 17	40th	1878
2008	Dale Jarrett	44	Toyota	DAY; 16	CAL; 33	LVS; 39	ATL; 26	BRI; 37																																26th	3303
2008	David Reutimann	44	Toyota						MAR; 39	TEX; 41	PHO; 18	TAL; 20	RCH; 22	DAR; 19	CLT; 10	DOV; 27	POC; 19	MCH; 35	SON; 40	NHA; 19	DAY; 21	CHI; 14	IND; 30	POC; 30	GLN; 33	MCH; 14	BRI; 25	CAL; 9	RCH; 9*	NHA; 15	DOV; 17	KAN; 19	TAL; 37	CLT; 32	MAR; 24	ATL; 28	TEX; 10	PHO; 25	HOM; 20	26th	3303

=== Car No. 55 history ===
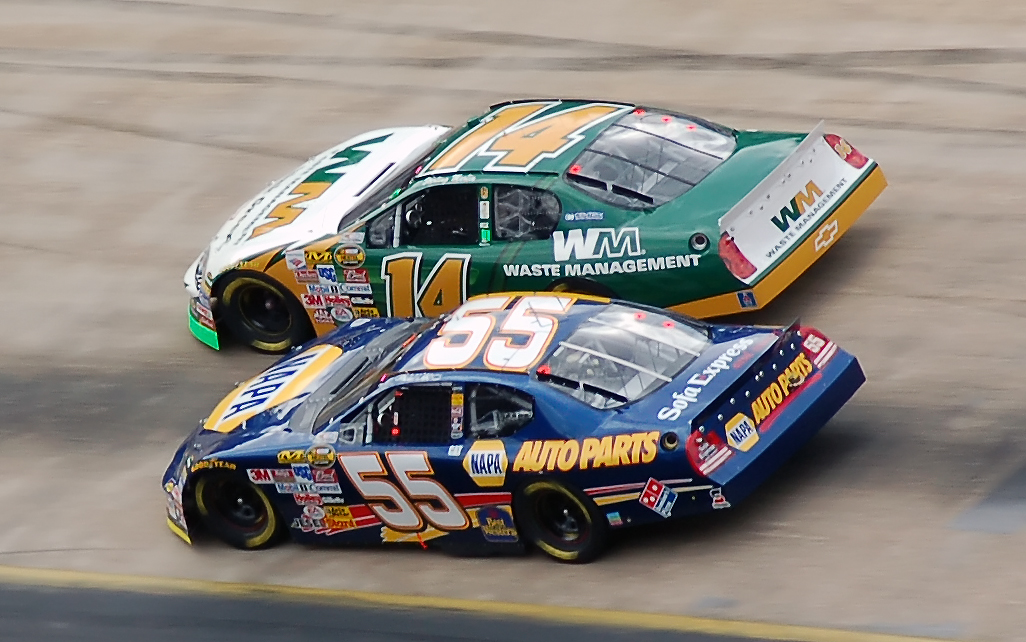
Michael Waltrip (No. 55) driving for Bill Davis Racing in 2006.

Michael Waltrip (2006–2009)

Michael Waltrip formed an alliance with Bill Davis Racing in 2006 as Davis was going to switch to Toyota in 2007, which was the selected manufacturer for Waltrip's new team as well. This enabled Waltrip to have a car to drive as he built his team. NAPA Auto Parts, Waltrip's sponsor, followed him to his new team and Waltrip ran a Dodge Charger for 2006, although unbranded due to the team already burning bridges with DaimlerChrysler. The team bought points from Penske Racing's No. 77 team, which shut down after it lost sponsorship. Since the listed owner of the No. 77 was Doug Bawel, whose Jasper Motorsports team was absorbed by Penske a few years earlier, his name was registered as owner and the No. 55 ran under the Waltrip-Jasper Racing banner for 2006. The arrangement called for the points to be transferred to Waltrip's new ride at MWR for 2007, which they were; however, Waltrip failed to make the top-35 in points, which meant Waltrip would have to qualify on time in 2007.

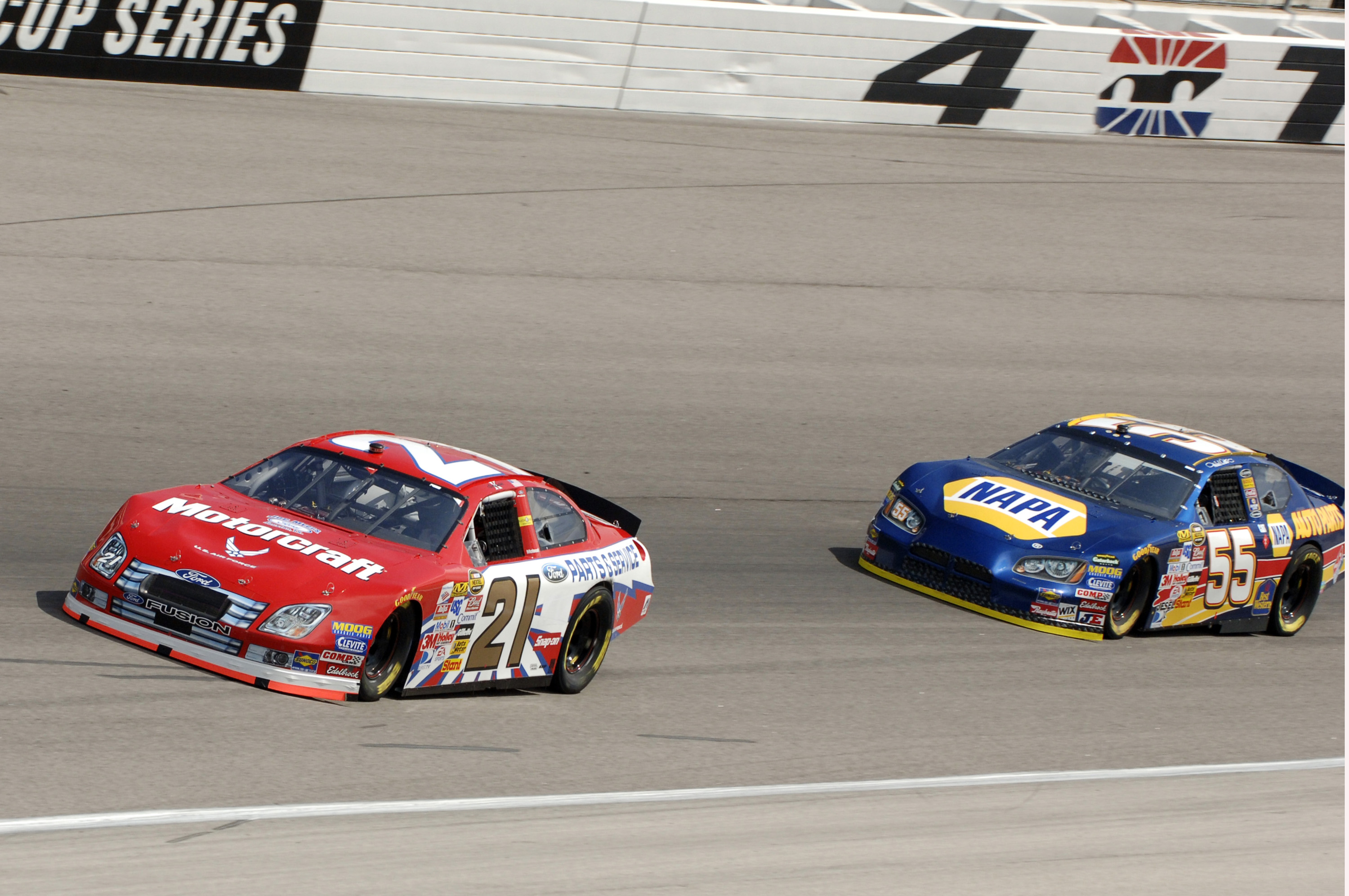
Michael Waltrip No. 55 NAPA Dodge (right) in 2006

Waltrip took his Bill Davis points to his own then-new Toyota Camry team for the 2007 season with sponsor NAPA Auto Parts in the Nextel Cup Series. It was a dismal first year for the No. 55 Toyota Camry in NASCAR top series competition, as Waltrip's team faced stiff penalties for using illegal fuel additives during qualifying for the Daytona 500. The team rebounded to qualify 15th via the Gatorade Duels, but finished 30th, leaving Daytona with negative driver and owner points (the team's finish in the Daytona 500 earned them 73 points, but the 100 point penalty they received from NASCAR left them last in the standings at −27 points). Waltrip proceeded to fail to qualify for 11 consecutive races before qualifying for his second race at Dover International Speedway on June 2. Making just his third start of the season at Michigan International Speedway on June 18, Waltrip posted the team's first top-10 finish and Toyota's third by finishing 10th and leading a lap. In order to take advantage of the champions provisional, Terry Labonte drove the No. 55 in 2007 at Infineon, Indianapolis, and Watkins Glen. Waltrip gave Toyota its second pole in Cup competition at Talladega on October 7 and grabbed another top-10 finish at Lowe's the following week, bringing his team barely inside the top 43 in points by the end of the season.

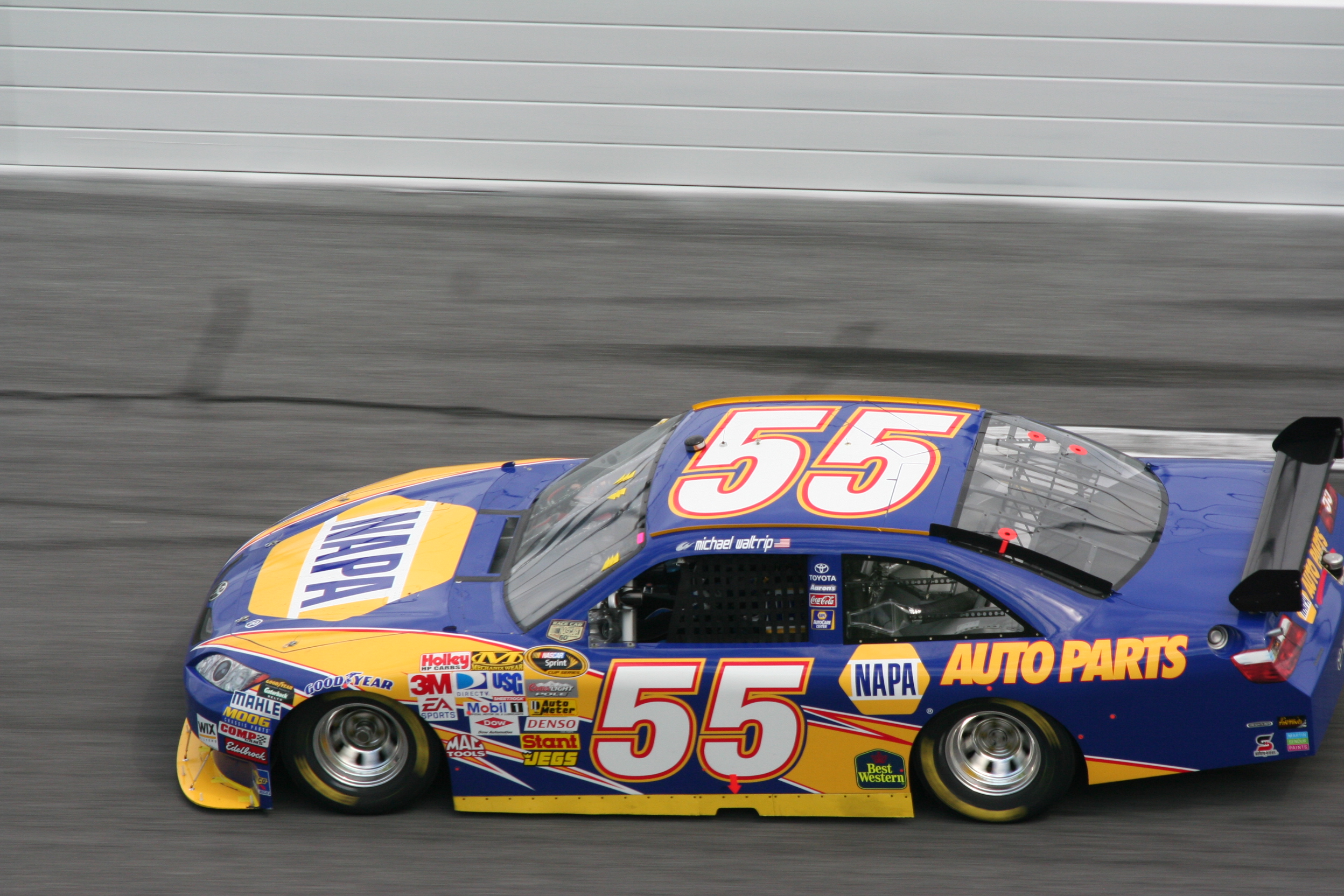
Michael Waltrip started on the outside pole for the 50th Daytona 500.

Waltrip continued to run the No. 55 during 2008 and 2009. The car qualified in the Top 35 in owner points for 2008, and Waltrip recorded his best finish as a Sprint Cup owner with a second place in the 2008 Lenox Industrial Tools 301 in June. In 2009, Waltrip started the season with a seventh-place finish in the 2009 Daytona 500. However, because Waltrip consistently qualified and finished behind both his teammate Reutimann and MWR satellite driver Marcos Ambrose during the first half of 2009, he began to discuss retirement as a driver, stating that, as his team's owner, he would make himself retire as a driver if he was no longer competitive.

Prism Motorsports (2010)

In 2010, Prism Motorsports, a mostly start and park team in a technical alliance with MWR, ran a second car full-time, numbered No. 55. For Talladega, Bristol, Michigan and Sonoma, Waltrip drove the No. 55 as part of Prism (Waltrip started and parked at Bristol and would have at Michigan had he qualified).

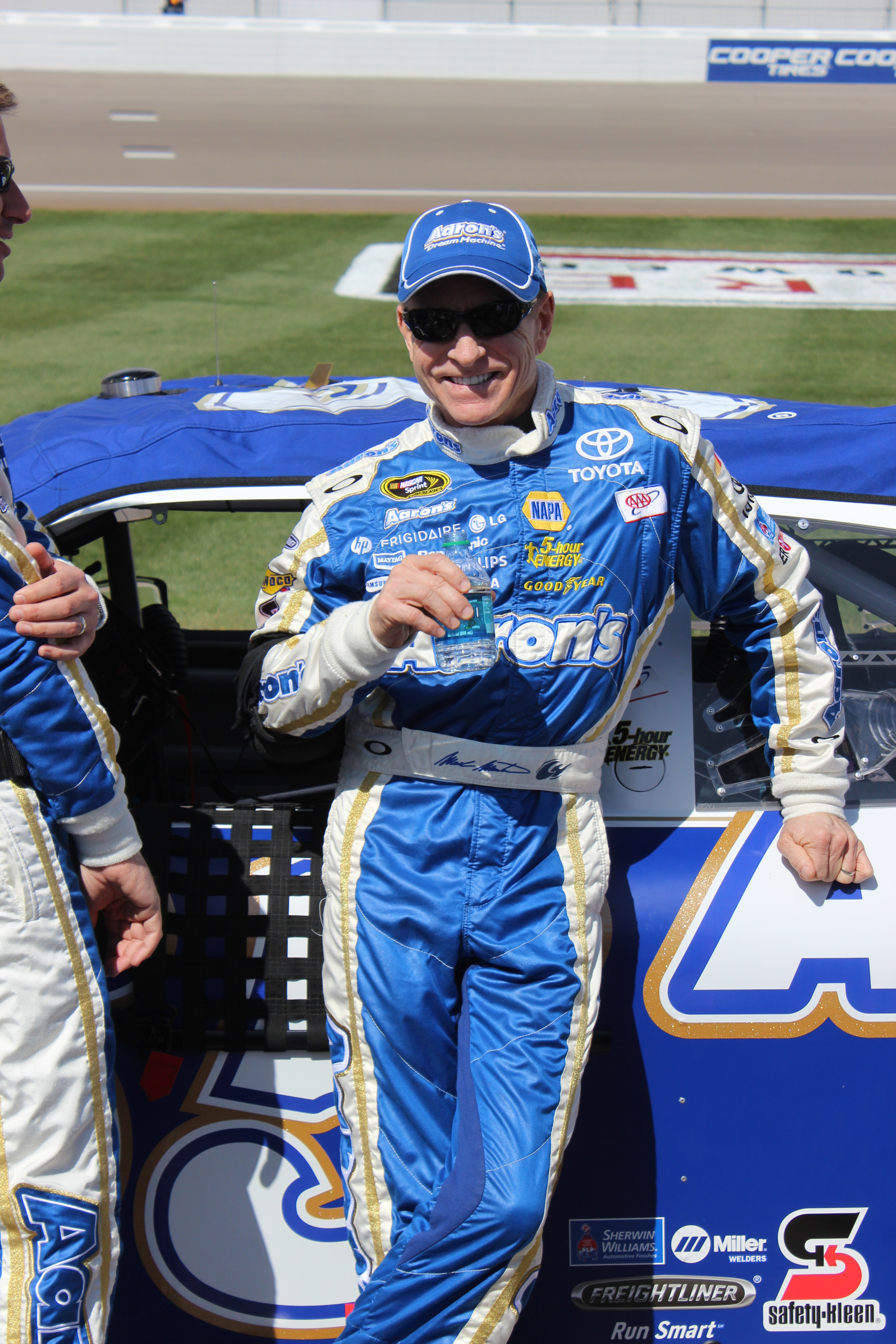
Mark Martin drove 24 races 2012 and 15 races in 2013.

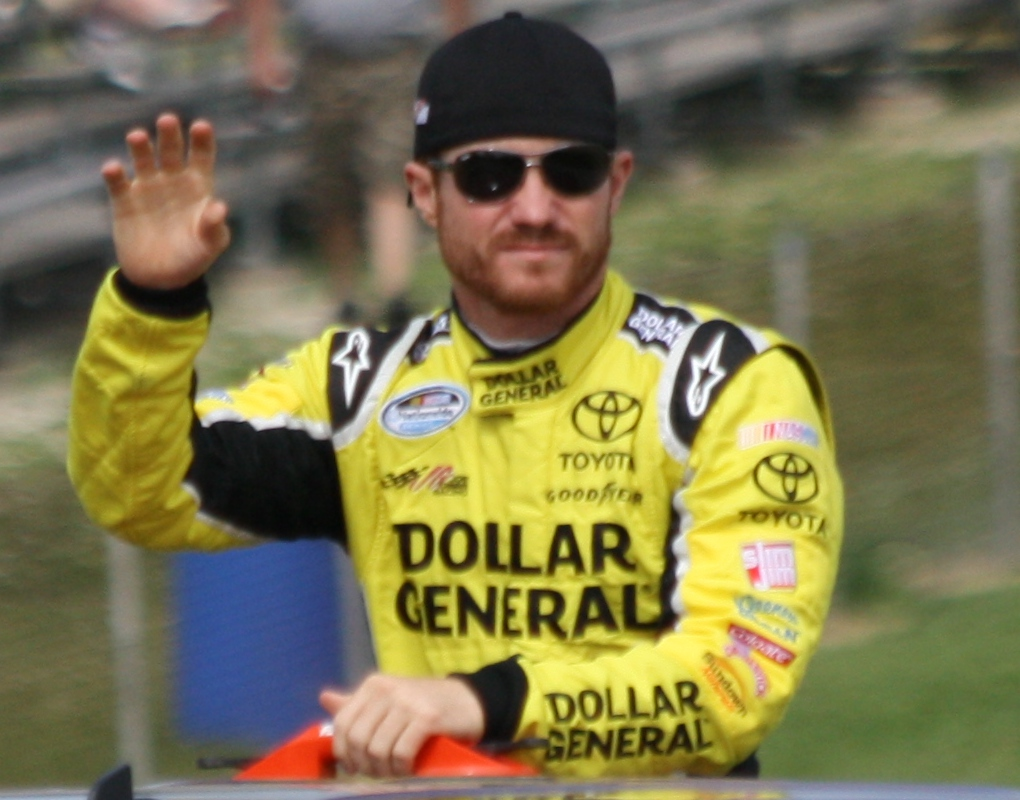
Brian Vickers drove 8 races in 2012 and 14 races in 2013.

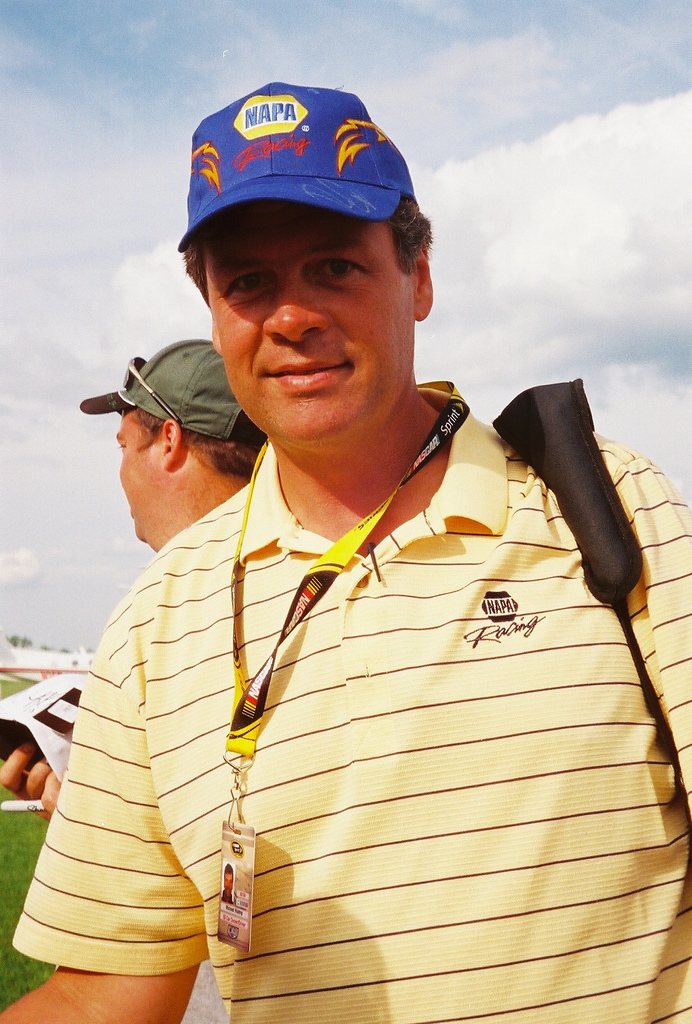
Michael Waltrip drove 4 races in 2012 and 3 races in 2013.

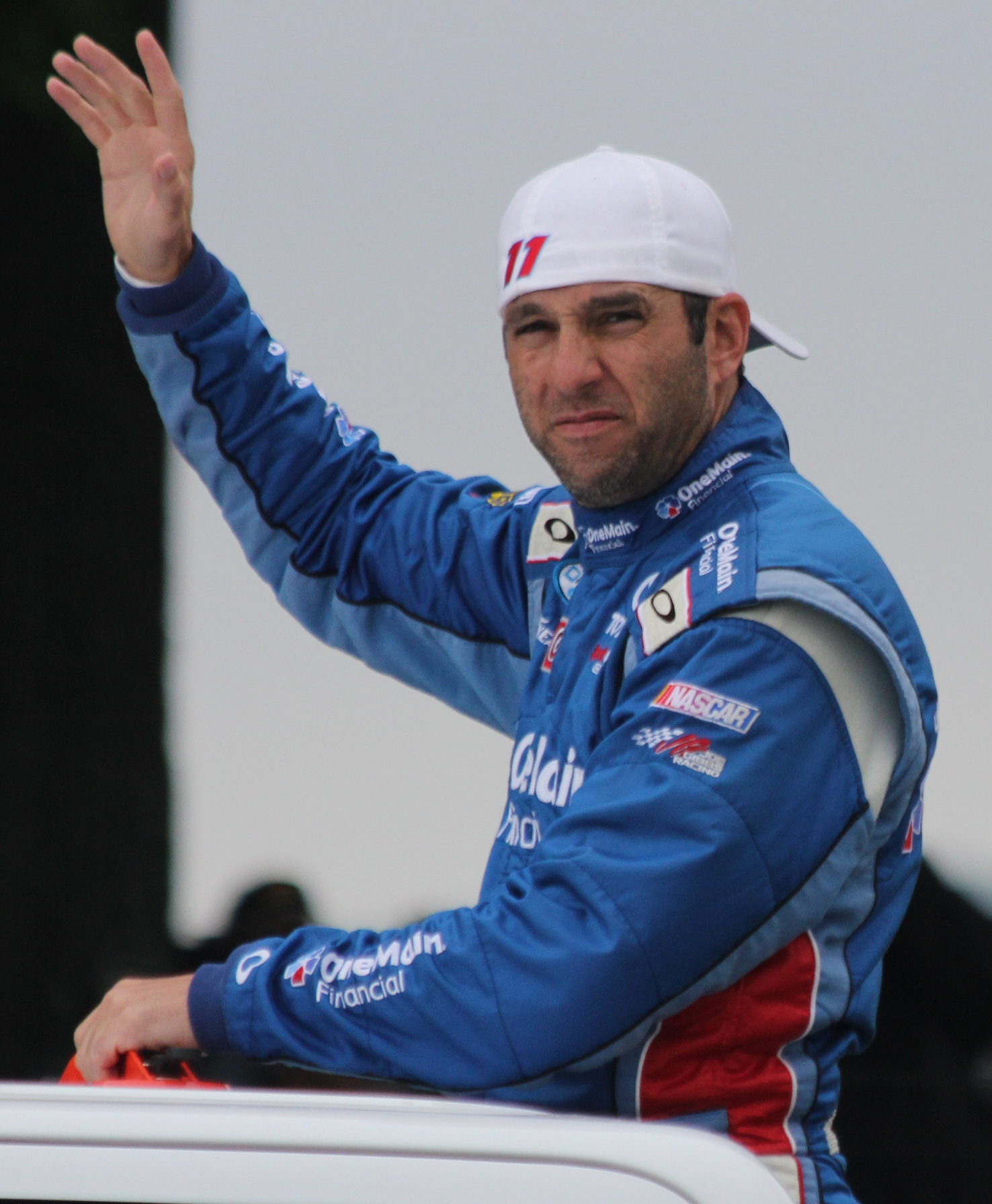
Elliott Sadler was supposed to drive the 55 for 8 races in 2012 but due to contractual reasons, Sadler was replaced by Brian Vickers. Sadler took over the 55 for the final 4 races in 2013.

Mark Martin and Brian Vickers (2012–2013)

The No. 55 returned in 2012 with Aaron's moving from the No. 00 car and Mark Martin hired to drive 24 races in the car for the next two seasons. Michael Waltrip drove the car in the Budweiser Shootout and also drove in the Aaron's 499, Coke Zero 400, Quaker State 400, and Good Sam Club 500. Former Red Bull Racing Team driver Brian Vickers was hired to drive at both races at Bristol, Martinsville, New Hampshire, and the two road courses.

In 2013, the No. 55 was again split. This time Waltrip would race 3 times under the No. 55 team, Martin would race 24 more times, and Vickers would race 9 times. In 2013, the No. 55 got its third NASCAR Sprint Cup victory at Loudon with Vickers driving. In the final laps, Vickers stole the lead from Tony Stewart and after a debris caution fought Stewart for the lead, ending with Stewart running out of gas in turn 3 just before the white flag; locking up the victory for Vickers. On August 13, it was announced that Vickers would run the No. 55 full-time in 2014 and 2015.

In early August, Tony Stewart broke his leg in a sprint car accident. It was determined that he would miss the rest of the year. Martin was hired to replace Stewart for most of the rest of the season except Talladega. Michael Waltrip Racing ultimately agreed to release Martin from the rest of his deal and give the No. 55 over to Vickers early (except for Talladega, where Waltrip was going to drive the car). However, blood clots discovered in Vickers' leg after the Charlotte race ended his season, necessitating the team to hire Elliott Sadler to drive the car for the remaining four races of the year.

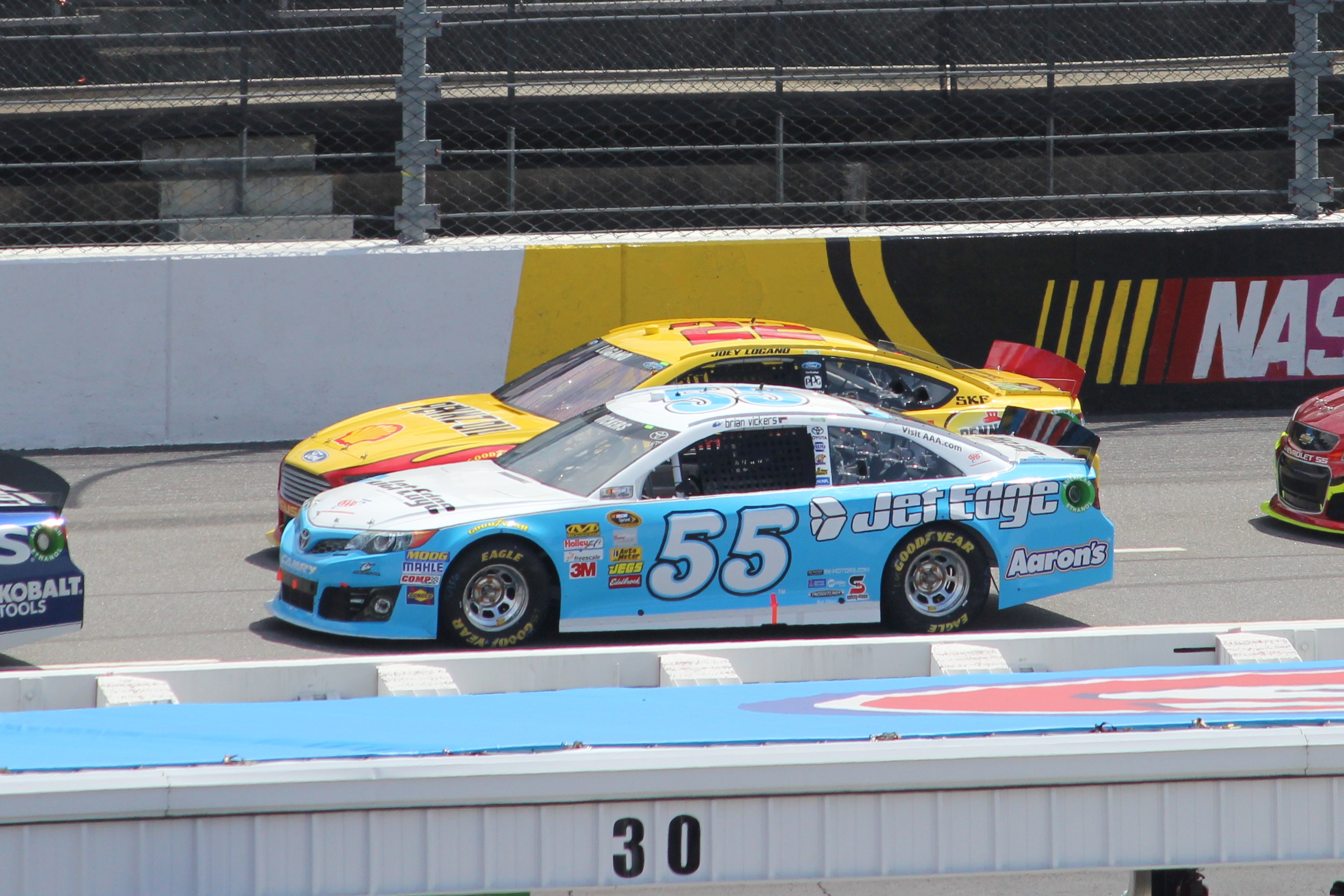
Brian Vickers at Martinsville in 2013.

Brian Vickers (2014–2015)

Vickers returned from his medical issues in 2014, but missed the Chase in only his second full season since 2009.

Vickers missed the first two races of the 2015 season after off-season surgery to repair a patch placed over a hole in his heart. Vickers Team owner and race driver Michael Waltrip raced the Daytona 500, while Brett Moffitt raced the No. 55 for the Folds of Honor QuikTrip 500. Vickers returned for two races before he was sidelined again just before Fontana. Moffitt was named the interim driver and later declared his candidacy for Rookie of the Year.

David Ragan (2015)

On April 24, it was announced that David Ragan would take over the No. 55 beginning at Kansas. Ragan had several strong runs in the 55, with potential top 10 finishes at Sonoma, Bristol, Daytona, Pocono, Watkins Glen, Martinsville, and Charlotte, but fell victim to bad racing luck, with crashes or mechanical failures in many events. He was ultimately released and left for BK Racing when MWR closed its doors.

==== Car No. 55 results ====
NASCAR Sprint Cup Series results
Year	Driver	No.	Make	1	2	3	4	5	6	7	8	9	10	11	12	13	14	15	16	17	18	19	20	21	22	23	24	25	26	27	28	29	30	31	32	33	34	35	36	Owners	Pts
2006	Michael Waltrip	55	Dodge	DAY; 18	CAL; 36	LVS; 35	ATL; 20	BRI; 32	MAR; 29	TEX; 26	PHO; 42	TAL; 25	RCH; 31	DAR; 35	CLT; DNQ	DOV; 32	POC; 28	MCH; 25	SON; 23	DAY; 38	CHI; 30	NHA; 36	POC; 40	IND; DNQ	GLN; 36	MCH; 23	BRI; 16	CAL; 31	RCH; DNQ	NHA; 23	DOV; 28	KAN; 35	TAL; 14	CLT; 38	MAR; 34	ATL; 33	TEX; 43	PHO; 42	HOM; DNQ	38th	2393
2007	Michael Waltrip	55	Toyota	DAY; 30	CAL; DNQ	LVS; DNQ	ATL; DNQ	BRI; DNQ	MAR; DNQ	TEX; DNQ	PHO; DNQ	TAL; DNQ	RCH; DNQ	DAR; DNQ	CLT; DNQ	DOV; 28	POC; DNQ	MCH; 10		NHA; DNQ	DAY; DNQ	CHI; 30		POC; 38		MCH; 40	BRI; 23	CAL; 42	RCH; DNQ	NHA; DNQ	DOV; 15	KAN; 30	TAL; 25	CLT; 10	MAR; 18	ATL; 11	TEX; DNQ	PHO; DNQ	HOM; DNQ	41st	1837
2007	Terry Labonte	55	Toyota																SON; 35				IND; 30		GLN; 30															41st	1837
2008	Michael Waltrip	55	Toyota	DAY; 29	CAL; 28	LVS; 31	ATL; 30	BRI; 23	MAR; 35	TEX; 31	PHO; 24	TAL; 27	RCH; 37	DAR; 24	CLT; 27	DOV; 28	POC; 37	MCH; 23	SON; 25	NHA; 2	DAY; 27	CHI; 36	IND; 43	POC; 43	GLN; 39	MCH; 19	BRI; 30	CAL; 33	RCH; 28	NHA; 25	DOV; 10	KAN; 35	TAL; 19	CLT; 24	MAR; 18	ATL; 37	TEX; 27	PHO; 24	HOM; 38	29th	2889
2009	Michael Waltrip	55	Toyota	DAY; 7	CAL; 15	LVS; 27	ATL; 25	BRI; 32	MAR; 13	TEX; 24	PHO; 37	TAL; 21	RCH; 24	DAR; 40	CLT; 30	DOV; 35	POC; 17	MCH; 30		NHA; 24	DAY; 37	CHI; 20	IND; 35	POC; 31		MCH; 27	BRI; 31	ATL; 32	RCH; 32	NHA; 27	DOV; 36	KAN; 38	CAL; 17	CLT; 32	MAR; 30	TAL; 7	TEX; 23	PHO; 36	HOM; 30	32nd	3033
2009	Patrick Carpentier	55	Toyota																SON; 11						GLN; 33															32nd	3033
2012	Mark Martin	55	Toyota	DAY; 10	PHO; 9	LVS; 18		CAL; 12		TEX; 3	KAN; 33	RCH; 8		DAR; 20	CLT; 34	DOV; 14	POC; 2	MCH; 29					IND; 11	POC; 12		MCH; 35^{*}		ATL; 10	RCH; 3	CHI; 14		DOV; 3		CLT; 6	KAN; 24		TEX; 29	PHO; 10	HOM; 16	15th	1045
2012	Brian Vickers	55	Toyota				BRI; 5		MAR; 18										SON; 4			NHA; 15			GLN; 43		BRI; 4				NHA; 9					MAR; 8				15th	1045
2012	Michael Waltrip	55	Toyota										TAL; 19							KEN; 30	DAY; 9												TAL; 25							15th	1045
2013	Mark Martin	55	Toyota	DAY; 3	PHO; 21	LVS; 14		CAL; 37		TEX; 14	KAN; 9	RCH; 38		DAR; 25	CLT; 34	DOV; 9	POC; 19	MCH; 26					IND; 23	POC; 18		MCH; 27														24th	853
2013	Brian Vickers	55	Toyota				BRI; 8		MAR; 11										SON; 13	KEN; 31		NHA; 1			GLN; 32		BRI; 4	ATL; 10	RCH; 24	CHI; 38	NHA; 7	DOV; 12	KAN; 32	CLT; 25						24th	853
2013	Michael Waltrip	55	Toyota										TAL; 4								DAY; 5														TAL; 32					24th	853
2013	Elliott Sadler	55	Toyota																																	MAR; 25	TEX; 19	PHO; 25	HOM; 14	24th	853
2014	Brian Vickers	55	Toyota	DAY; 30	PHO; 25	LVS; 13	BRI; 9	CAL; 7	MAR; 16	TEX; 4	DAR; 26	RCH; 12	TAL; 4	KAN; 14	CLT; 6	DOV; 43	POC; 19	MCH; 42	SON; 14	KEN; 26	DAY; 2	NHA; 21	IND; 19	POC; 37	GLN; 10	MCH; 19	BRI; 21	ATL; 15	RCH; 13	CHI; 24	NHA; 10	DOV; 15	KAN; 10	CLT; 37	TAL; 20	MAR; 27	TEX; 16	PHO; 19	HOM; 23	22nd	921
2015	Michael Waltrip	55	Toyota	DAY; 26									TAL; 36																											28th	667
2015	Brett Moffitt	55	Toyota		ATL; 8			CAL; 22	MAR; 28	TEX; 29	BRI; 17	RCH; 29																												28th	667
2015	Brian Vickers	55	Toyota			LVS; 15	PHO; 41																																	28th	667
2015	David Ragan	55	Toyota											KAN; 33	CLT; 41	DOV; 13	POC; 23	MCH; 35	SON; 39	DAY; 12	KEN; 18	NHA; 18	IND; 21	POC; 17	GLN; 23	MCH; 18	BRI; 40	DAR; 40	RCH; 17	CHI; 15	NHA; 41	DOV; 22	CLT; 37	KAN; 25	TAL; 30	MAR; 25	TEX; 23	PHO; 18	HOM; 27	28th	667

=== Car No. 56 history ===
Martin Truex Jr. (2010–2013)

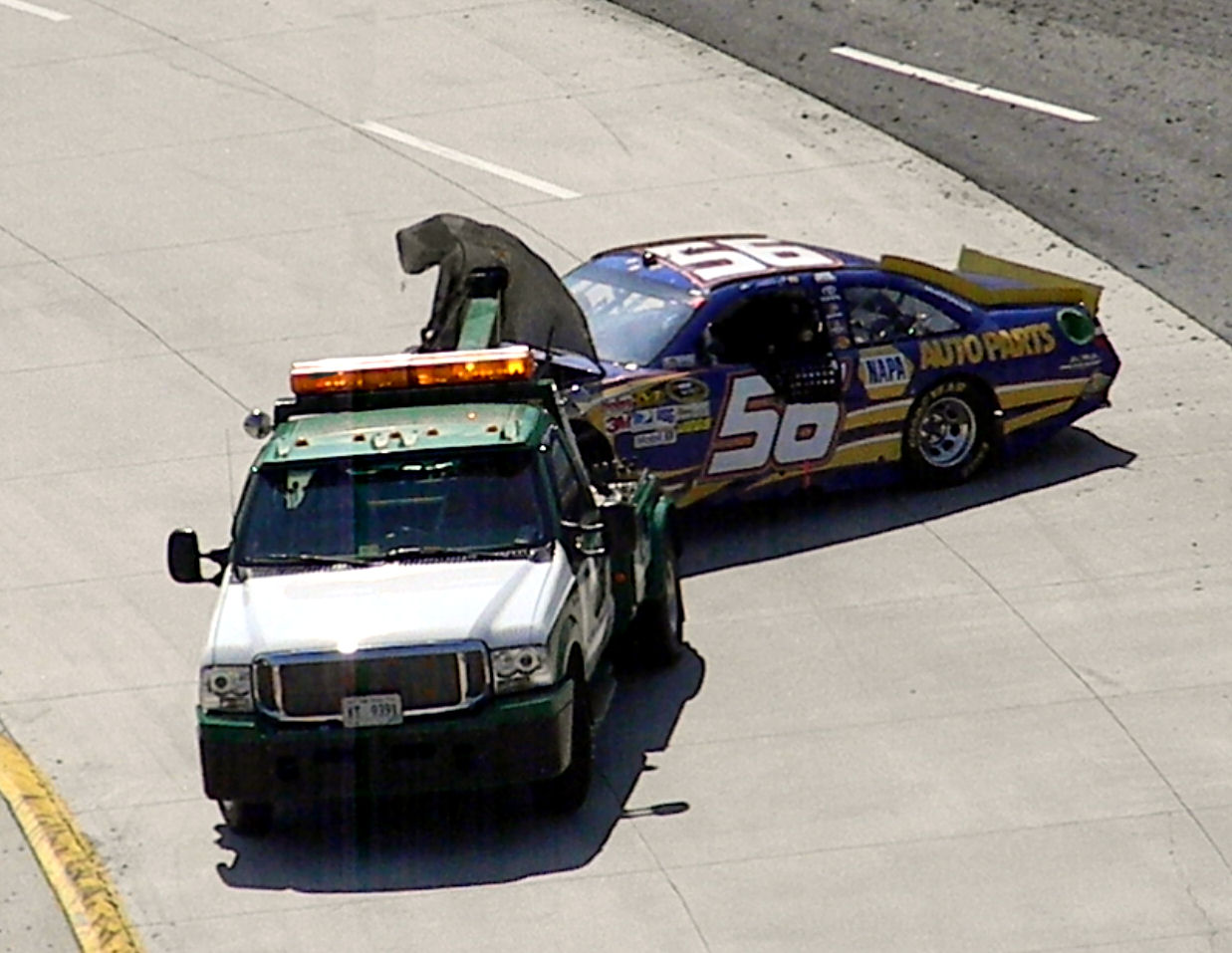
Truex's car following an accident at Martinsville

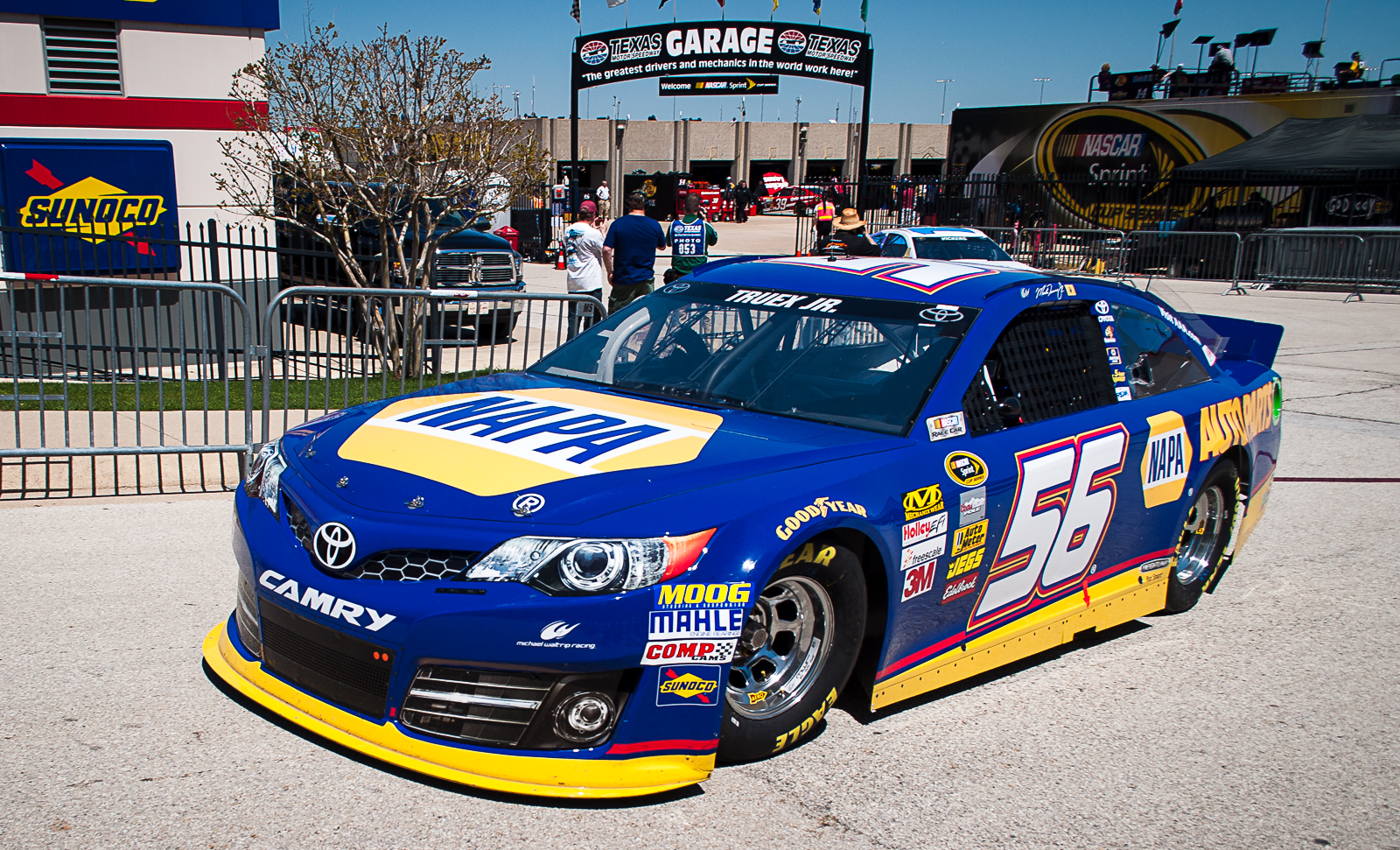
Truex's 2013 No. 56 Sprint Cup car at Texas Motor Speedway

In 2010, Martin Truex Jr. replaced Waltrip as the driver for this team, renumbered as No. 56. The No. 56 team used the No. 55's owner's points for 2010. Truex would join Bowyer in qualifying for the Chase for the Sprint Cup in 2012. On June 23, 2013, Truex won the Toyota Save/Mart 350 at Sonoma by 8 seconds over Jeff Gordon, his 2nd career victory (breaking a 218-race winless streak as a driver stretching back to June 3rd, 2007), and the 7th as well as final victory for MWR in the Series. Truex also had initially joined Bowyer again in the 2013 Chase, but controversy arose in the final race before the Chase at Richmond, in which MWR was found to have deliberately manipulated the end of the race in order to allow Truex to hold off Ryan Newman for a Chase spot (see above). On September 9, NASCAR ejected Truex from the Chase and placed Newman in. On September 19, NAPA announced that it will no longer sponsor the No. 56. On October 14, it was announced that due to the lack of sponsorship or a driver, the car's points would be moved to a new research and development team starting in 2014, later named Identity Ventures Racing. It was also announced three days later that Truex was picked up by Furniture Row Racing to take over the No. 78 from the departing Kurt Busch.

==== Car No. 56 results ====
NASCAR Sprint Cup Series results
Year	Driver	No.	Make	1	2	3	4	5	6	7	8	9	10	11	12	13	14	15	16	17	18	19	20	21	22	23	24	25	26	27	28	29	30	31	32	33	34	35	36	Owners	Pts
2010	Martin Truex Jr.	56	Toyota	DAY; 6	CAL; 39	LVS; 20	ATL; 27	BRI; 12	MAR; 5	PHO; 17	TEX; 9	TAL; 12	RCH; 7	DAR; 19	DOV; 12	CLT; 23	POC; 25	MCH; 17	SON; 42	NHA; 22	DAY; 35	CHI; 11	IND; 26	POC; 9	GLN; 15	MCH; 8	BRI; 17	ATL; 12	RCH; 22	NHA; 20	DOV; 34	KAN; 20	CAL; 18	CLT; 15	MAR; 29	TAL; 6	TEX; 38	PHO; 15	HOM; 11	22nd	3916
2011	Martin Truex Jr.	56	Toyota	DAY; 19	PHO; 14	LVS; 6	BRI; 17	CAL; 21	MAR; 40	TEX; 35	TAL; 13	RCH; 27	DAR; 10	DOV; 8	CLT; 26	KAN; 20	POC; 10	MCH; 26	SON; 8	DAY; 35	KEN; 18	NHA; 8	IND; 24	POC; 12	GLN; 4	MCH; 19	BRI; 2	ATL; 14	RCH; 30	CHI; 18	NHA; 16	DOV; 30	KAN; 36	CLT; 23	TAL; 10	MAR; 8	TEX; 8	PHO; 20	HOM; 3	18th	937
2012	Martin Truex Jr.	56	Toyota	DAY; 12	PHO; 7	LVS; 17	BRI; 3	CAL; 8	MAR; 5	TEX; 6	KAN; 2*	RCH; 25	TAL; 28	DAR; 5	CLT; 12	DOV; 7	POC; 20	MCH; 12	SON; 22	KEN; 8	DAY; 17	NHA; 11	IND; 8	POC; 3	GLN; 10	MCH; 10	BRI; 11	ATL; 4	RCH; 21	CHI; 9	NHA; 17	DOV; 6	TAL; 13	CLT; 10	KAN; 2	MAR; 23	TEX; 13	PHO; 43	HOM; 6	11th	2299
2013	Martin Truex Jr.	56	Toyota	DAY; 24	PHO; 36	LVS; 8	BRI; 12	CAL; 18	MAR; 40	TEX; 2	KAN; 4	RCH; 17	TAL; 7	DAR; 12	CLT; 9	DOV; 38	POC; 23	MCH; 3	SON; 1*	KEN; 7	DAY; 41	NHA; 16	IND; 11	POC; 15	GLN; 3	MCH; 16	BRI; 35	ATL; 3	RCH; 7	CHI; 18	NHA; 10	DOV; 15	KAN; 19	CLT; 22	TAL; 8	MAR; 16	TEX; 14	PHO; 8	HOM; 4	16th	998

=== Car No. 66 history ===
In 2009, MWR fielded a car for Dave Blaney and Prism Motorsports at the Coca-Cola 600. The car was sponsored by Aaron's and used Prism's No. 66.

In 2014, with no driver or sponsor lined up, the points from the former No. 56 car was transferred to Identity Ventures Racing, owned by Nat Hardwick and Jay Robinson, and the number was changed to 66. The car was fielded out of the MWR shop for select races for Michael Waltrip, Jeff Burton, and Brett Moffitt, with Waltrip and Moffitt running select races with MWR support out of Robinson's shop. The other primary drivers were Joe Nemechek and Mike Wallace. Identity Ventures Racing folded after one season due to ownership issues, ending the satellite team.

=== Car No. 98 history ===
Michael Waltrip Racing began racing in the Winston Cup Series in 2002, making its debut at the 2002 Aaron's 499. The car was the No. 98 Aaron's Chevrolet Monte Carlo driven by Kenny Wallace. Wallace qualified 27th and finished 21st. Following that first race, Waltrip sold the No. 98 and its owner points to Innovative Motorsports.

In October 2015, MWR leased the owner points from the No. 98 of Premium Motorsports to field a car for Waltrip himself at the fall Talladega race. Premium is owned by Jay Robinson, who was a partner in MWR's research and development team the previous season.

== Nationwide Series ==
=== Car No. 99 history ===
Michael Waltrip (1996-2006)

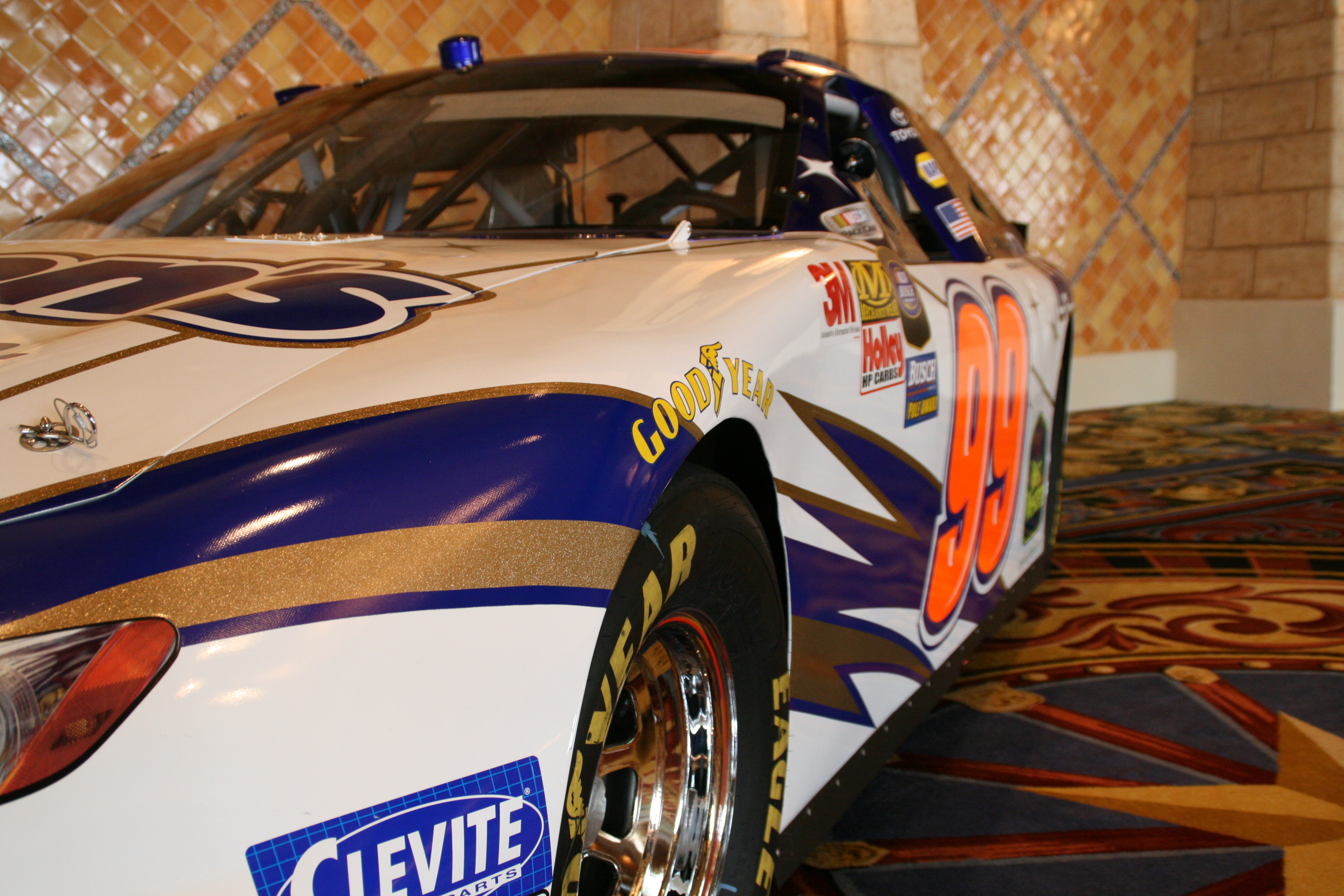
David Reutimann drove the No. 99 Aaron's Toyota Camry in the Nationwide Series in 2007.

Waltrip made his debut as a car owner in 1996 driving the No. 12 MW Windows Ford Thunderbird. He ran thirteen races that season, winning the pole at Richmond International Raceway and posting three top-five finishes. The next season, MWR switched to the No. 21 with sponsorship from Band-Aid and had three fourth-place finishes, and had six top-ten finishes the following season. In 1998, Waltrip fielded a second car, the No. 14 Rhodes Furniture Ford for Patty Moise full-time. Moise made 19 starts and a best finish of tenth at Bristol Motor Speedway, finishing 37th in points.

In 1999, Waltrip got his first career win as an owner/driver at the All Pro Bumper to Bumper 300. The next year, he switched to the No. 7 as well as driving the No. 99 car with Aarons sponsorship for three races, his best finish coming at Michigan International Speedway, where he placed second. Ted Christopher drove the No. 99 at Memphis Motorsports Park with sponsorship from LesCare Kitchens, qualifying 29th and finishing 28th. MWR switched to the No. 99 full-time in 2001, as Waltrip drove twelve races, his best finish third at the Aaron's 312. Waltrip also fielded the 99 for three races for Shawna Robinson, who had a 19th at Talladega Superspeedway, and Kerry Earnhardt, whose best finish was a 20th at Kentucky Speedway.

Waltrip had sole driving duties in 2002, running nineteen races and winning at Michigan International Speedway. The following season, he won at Bristol Motor Speedway. After making 31 starts in 2004 and winning at Nashville Superspeedway, Waltrip had only four top-tens in 2005. In 2006, Waltrip partnered with FitzBradshaw Racing to pick up FitzBradshaw's No. 40 car's owner's points. He drove a majority of the races in 2006, with his brother Darrell and David Reutimann driving additional races using Evernham engines.

David Reutimann (2006-2008)

David Reutimann drove the No. 99 Aaron's Toyota Camry for Waltrip in 2007. He won his first career Nationwide Series race with the team at Memphis Motorsports Park in October, and finished second in points. In the latter part of 2007, MWR also fielded a second car with Michael McDowell to prepare him for a possible Sprint Cup career.

Trevor Bayne (2009-2010)

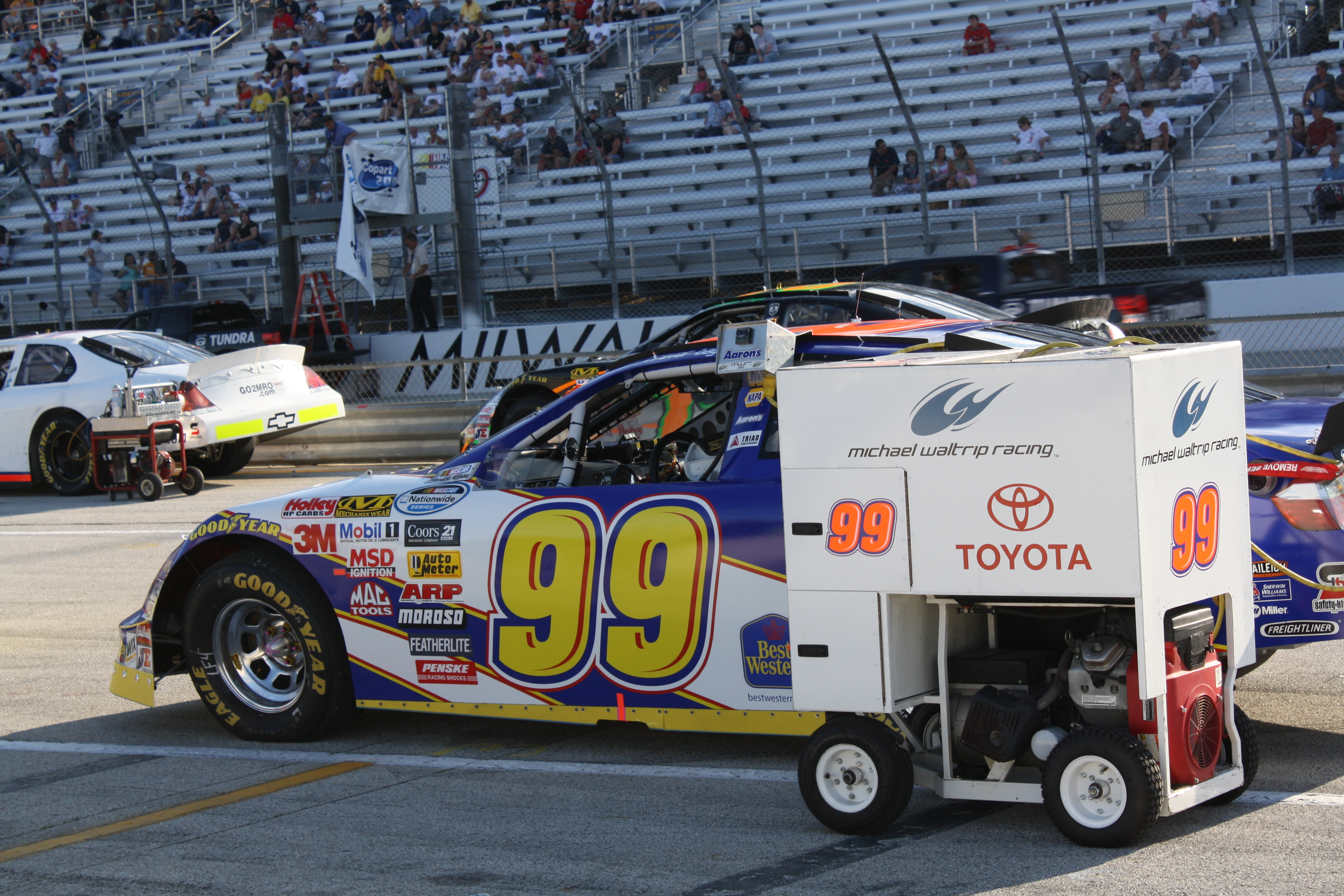
Trevor Bayne at Milwaukee in 2009.

In 2009, the No. 99 Toyota carried split by Michael Waltrip with sponsorship from Aaron's and Best Western, Trevor Bayne, and Scott Speed with sponsorship from Red Bull Energy Drink. For 2010 the team was co-purchased by former Diamond Ridge Motorsports owner Gary Bechtel to form Diamond-Waltrip Racing to field development driver Trevor Bayne in the No. 99 full-time for 2010, though they had limited sponsorship. Trevor Bayne left the team before the Kansas Speedway race in September. Martin Truex Jr. is the replacement driver for the rest of the 2010 NASCAR Nationwide Series. Also, the team fielded the No. 00 NAPA Auto Parts/OUT! Pet Care Toyota for Ryan Truex and Truex Jr. on a limited basis in 2010.

Shut Down (2011)

Travis Pastrana announced his intent to drive 7 races in 2011 with Boost Mobile, with Ryan Truex intending to run the remaining schedule minus the superspeedways. However, Pastrana was injured at X Games XVII and sat out the rest of 2011, stating that he would run the Nationwide Series in 2012. Truex's bid for Rookie of the Year was cut short when a lack of sponsorship forced the team to shut down briefly. The No. 99 team returned for some races in 2011, with Cole Whitt driving at Charlotte and Patrick Carpentier driving his final race at Montreal. In 2012, MWR allied itself with Nationwide Series team RAB Racing to field Pastrana for 7 races. He would later join Roush Fenway Racing for 2013.

== Craftsman Truck Series ==
=== Truck No. 1 history ===
In 1996, Michael Waltrip drove the No. 1 truck with sponsorship MW Windows at Las Vegas where he started 27th and finished 4th.

In 1997, Michael drove three races this season starting at Daytona, Martinsville and Fontana. The No. 1 truck has new sponsorship Citgo, and Band-Aid.

== Partnerships and alliances ==
=== MWR-AF Corse ===
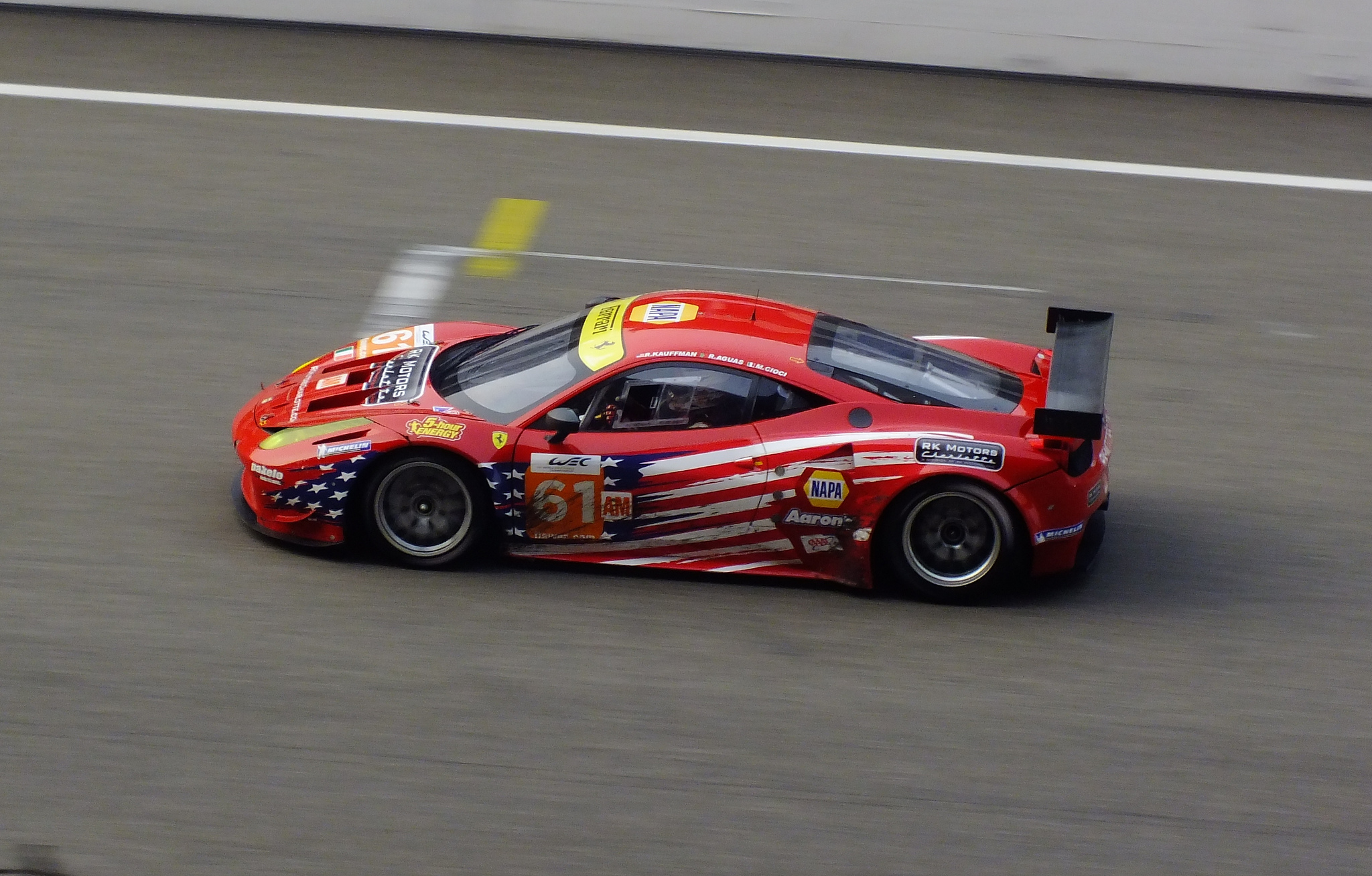
AF Waltrip Ferrari Shanghai

In 2011 MWR entered into a technical alliance with AF Corse to provide them sportscars to race in the FIA World Endurance Championship and Tudor United SportsCar Championship (formerly Rolex Sports Car Series) competing under the AF Corse-Waltrip banner.

=== MWR-Prism Motorsports ===
At the start of the 2009 season, MWR entered into a technical alliance with Prism Motorsports for the 2009 season. Prism entered the No. 66 car in each race, normally driven by Dave Blaney but also driven by Terry Labonte at the Daytona 500 and Michael McDowell at the Aaron's 499, with one-race sponsorship also provided by Aaron's for the 2009 Coca-Cola 600. MWR provided Prism with cars, engines and technical support. Prism became notorious as a start and park operation, only running a full race when the team had full sponsorship for the race, but the team has qualified for almost every race of the 2009 Sprint Cup season using the MWR equipment, sometimes beating out fully sponsored teams.

For 2010, Prism added a second car provided by MWR, the No. 55, driven by former MWR Sprint Cup driver Michael McDowell. As of the start of the season, Prism had no sponsorship for either car. Prism co-owner Phil Parsons credited MWR with "allow[ing] us to purchase the cars and equipment we needed to grow our program." Although Blaney failed to qualify for the Daytona 500, McDowell succeeded in qualifying for the starting field, using Michael Waltrip's old No. 55 car. For Talladega, Waltrip drove the No. 55 car for Prism, with Aaron's providing sponsorship.

=== MWR-Germain Racing ===
Germain Racing was an existing NASCAR Nationwide Series team that entered into Sprint Cup racing through a technical alliance with MWR beginning with two races during the 2008 season, with MWR supplying the No. 13 Toyota Camry and technical support for Germain and driver Max Papis. Papis had previously driven for MWR vice president Cal Wells in the CART series.

In 2009, Germain Racing attempted to run a limited schedule in the Sprint Cup Series with Papis and sponsor GEICO. The team qualified for 15 races in 21 attempts. Germain planned to run full-time in 2010, but it might be required to start and park some unscheduled events due to its limited sponsorship from GEICO and lack of additional sponsorship. In the first event of the 2010 season, Papis qualified for the Daytona 500, and since then, the No. 13 Toyota Camry has qualified for four of the first five races.

In 2004, Michael Waltrip Racing began at partnership with Best Western that continues today. In 2011 for example, the hotel served as the primary sponsor for the Number 00 Toyota Camry driven by David Reutimann for the NASCAR Sprint Cup Series.

=== Diamond-Waltrip Racing ===
After the 2009 season, MWR sold the assets of its Nationwide team to Gary Bechtel and his Diamond Ridge Motorsports. Running the under the moniker of Diamond-Waltrip Racing, Bechtel's team ran the No. 99 Toyota for MWR drivers Trevor Bayne, Ryan Truex, And Martin Truex Jr. and received technical support, equipment, owner's points, and employees from Waltrip.

=== Waltrip-Jasper Racing ===
On January 20, 2006, Michael Waltrip and president of Jasper Motorsports, Doug Bawel, announced the forming of Waltrip-Jasper Racing. Waltrip-Jasper Racing fielded the No. 55 NAPA Auto Parts Car in the 2006 Nextel Cup Series, driven by Waltrip. Bawel, as the listed owner of the No. 77 that he fielded with Roger Penske in 2005, had a guaranteed starting spot in the first five races of 2006 by virtue of finishing 34th in the 2005 owner points. This enabled Waltrip to make the first five races in 2006 without qualifying on time.

The Waltrip-Jasper partnership ceased at the end of the 2006 season.

=== Waltrip-PPI Racing ===
The partnership of Michael Waltrip Racing and PPI Motorsports was officially announced on February 10, 2007. The partnership was limited to the No. 00 car, driven by David Reutimann. Cal Wells was listed as the owner and the 2006 owner points for the No. 32 were transferred to the No. 00 for the 2007 season. The partnership included the purchase of all equipment and personnel at PPI Motorsports, as the former No. 32 pit crew became the No. 00 pit crew.

The Waltrip-PPI partnership ceased at the end of the 2007 season, with Cal Wells moving to a management position at Waltrip Racing.

=== MWR-RAB Racing / Pastrana-Waltrip Racing ===
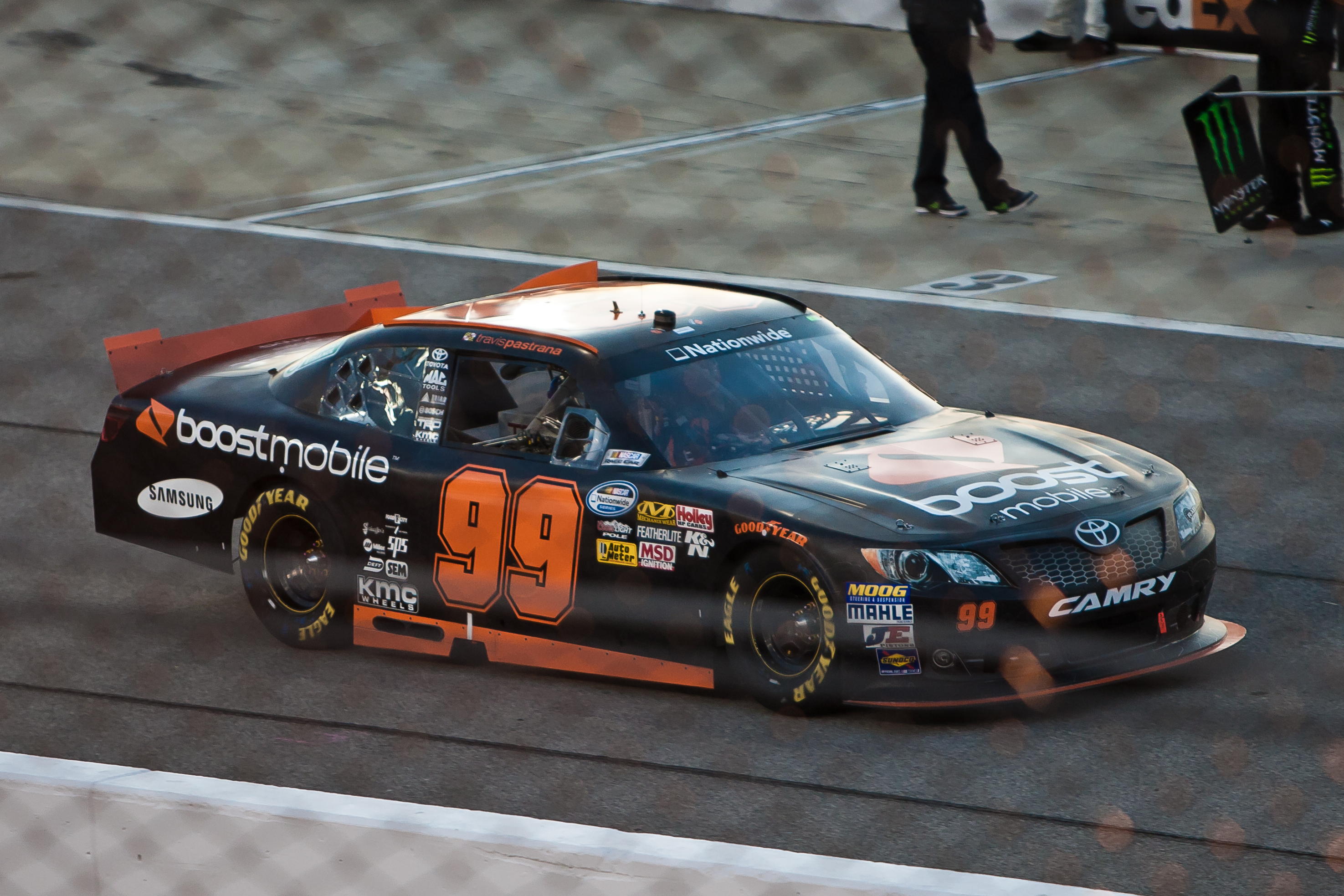
Travis Pastrana in 2012.

For 2011, MWR and X-Games gold medal driver Travis Pastrana announced a partnership known as Pastrana-Waltrip Racing. Pastrana would run seven races out of the MWR shop in the Nationwide Series for 2011, with Boost Mobile sponsoring the effort. Pastrana would then run 20 races in 2012. Pastrana would also run in the K&N Pro Series East, making his stock car debut in the Toyota All-Star Showdown. MWR development driver Ryan Truex would fill out the rest of the schedule. Red Bull development driver Cole Whitt ran at Charlotte in May. An ankle injury to Pastrana in X Games competition, however, sidelined him for the season prior to making any starts, and lack of funding forced the team to shut down mid-season.

MWR and Pastrana planned to restart Pastrana's NASCAR career in 2012, with the team being renamed Pastrana 199 Racing. On April 17, 2012, the team announced a partnership with Nationwide Series team RAB Racing. With RAB lacking a sponsor for regular driver Kenny Wallace and MWR unable to afford fielding the Nationwide team, the two teams formed a partnership to have Pastrana run in his previously assigned 7 races. RAB's number was changed from No. 09 to No. 99, and the team received additional cars and support from MWR. RAB crew chief Scott Zippadelli worked with Pastrana in his starts. Coincidentally, Ryan Truex ran several races for the team under RAB though he had been granted his release from MWR. RAB fielded MWR driver Patrick Carpentier with NAPA at Montreal in July. Though the partnership ended after the 2012 season, RAB continues to use the number 99.

=== MWR-Identity Ventures Racing ===
In 2014, a MWR satellite team, Identity Ventures Racing, was formed, fielding the No. 66 Toyota Camry. MWR provided tires and technical assistance, with some races receiving more support than others (depending on sponsorship). Races with more sponsorship received more support for MWR. Michael Waltrip, Joe Nemechek, Jeff Burton and Brett Moffitt were the primary drivers in 2014. As the season continued, Nemechek and Burton's races began getting handed to younger drivers. Moffitt began to take Burton and Nemechek's races, with neither veteran finishing the season in the No. 66. IVR shut down after just one season when team co-owner Nat Hardwick was involved in an embezzlement scandal involving his companies Landcastle Title and Morris-Hardwick-Schneider (which were the team's primary sponsors).

== Michael Waltrip Racing executive team ==
Ty Norris Norris was the E.V.P. of Business Development and was also the General Manager. Ty Norris’ career in NASCAR span the course of 15 years and includes some of the sport's most recognizable names – Dale Earnhardt, Inc., Speedway Motorsports, Inc. and RJ Reynolds. Over the past few years, Norris applied his industry knowledge to help grow Michael Waltrip Racing and negotiate key partnerships with sponsors, such as, NAPA Auto Parts, Aaron's and TUMS.

Larry Johns Larry Johns was the E.V.P. and CFO. As Chief Financial Officer Larry Johns was primarily responsible for managing the 250-employee company's cash flow as well as communicating the team's strategic direction for execution from the shop floor to the racetrack. Johns previously served as CFO of PPI Motorsports, LLC and prior to that owned his own business for almost a decade.

Scott Miller Executive Vice President of Competition

Bobby Kennedy Kennedy was the E.V.P. of Race Operations. Kennedy's NASCAR career began in 1987 and includes affiliations with organizations such as SABCO and Petty Enterprises. He joined Michael Waltrip Racing in January 2001.

== Former employees ==
Cal Wells – Wells was the E.V.P. and COO. Wells has a rich racing history and his motorsports experience spans over 30 years. Wells has achieved quite a bit in his career and his business savvy has allowed him to become an owner himself in a variety of racing series. In his most recent role, Wells was in charge of overseeing day-to-day operations for three NSCS teams and one NNS team at Michael Waltrip Racing. Wells was terminated from his position in July 2011.

Steve Hallam Hallam was the E.V.P. and Director of Competition. Hallam moved from England to North Carolina when he joined Michael Waltrip Racing before the 2009 season, giving up his job as head of race operations for McLaren after 27 years as an engineer and manager in Formula One. His resume includes 445 Grands Prix and six world championships. Hallam was terminated from his position in July 2011.

== Raceworld USA ==
Raceworld USA, located in Cornelius, North Carolina, was the race shop and center of operations for Michael Waltrip Racing. The main shop facility consisted of 107,000 square feet (9,900 m^{2}) while the fabrication shop consisted of the remaining 35,000 square feet (3,300 m^{2}).

Raceworld USA was also intended to be a tourist attraction. The shop featured elevated walkways and flat screen televisions, providing fans with an interactive inside look on how a race team functions. Also, Raceworld USA allowed patrons to hold events at the race shop.

The exhibit content in the facility was designed by Portland, Oregon–based Downstream.

== Controversy ==
In 2010, Michael Waltrip Racing filed a lawsuit against the Williams F1 team, for reportedly stealing one of their employees while he was under contract with MWR. The employee in question was Mike Coughlan, who was an F1 engineer involved in a cheating scandal in 2007. While he was suspended from F1, Coughlan worked as an engineer for the team. When his suspension from F1 was over, he allegedly went back to the Williams team while still under contract with MWR, which MWR alleged caused the team to suffer financially. The lawsuit was settled out of court in October 2011; the settlement was very amicable, as Waltrip later invited Coughlan to a future race as a guest of the team.

Just before its shutdown at the end of 2015, MWR was sued by former tire carrier Brandon Hopkins. Hopkins was injured in a pit road accident that required surgery while servicing Clint Bowyer's No. 15 car. Hopkins accused MWR of blacklisting him, wrongfully terminating his contract with the team, libel, and intentional interference with his efforts to find work at another team. Michael Waltrip Racing counter-sued Hopkins, saying that he stole pit guns from the team which was the cause of his firing. In their countersuit against Hopkins, MWR asked to be reimbursed for the pit guns and for any claims by Hopkins to be dismissed. After years of back-and-forth between Hopkins and the defunct team, it was announced in November 2017 that "both parties are pleased to announce that they have amicably resolved their disputes in their entirety and wish each other well in the future."
