= NAPA Auto Parts =

American automotive retailers' cooperative

National Automotive Parts Association

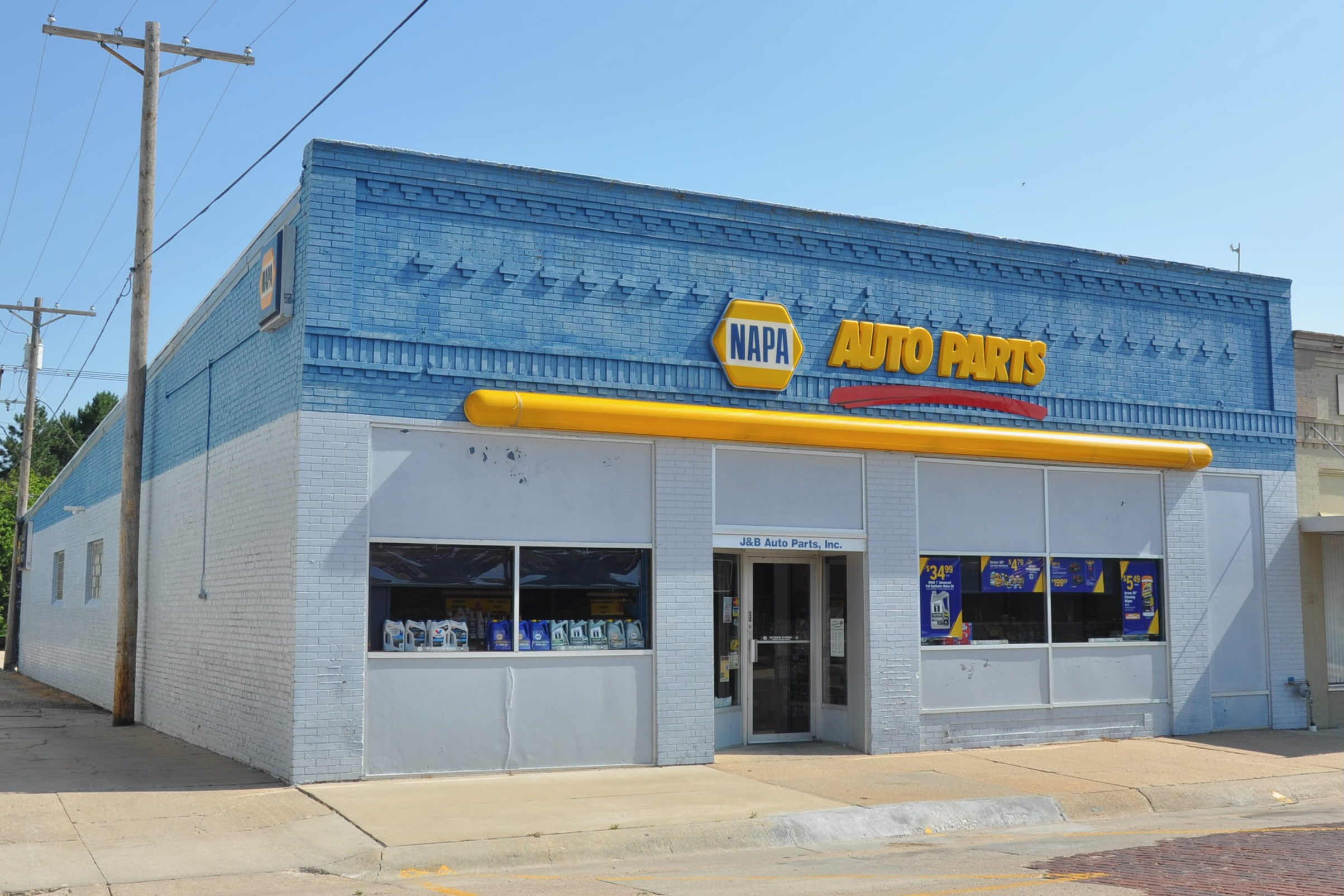
- Exterior of a NAPA Auto Parts store in Schuyler, Nebraska, in 2024
- Type: Subsidiary
- Industry: Automotive
- Founded: 1925; 101 years ago
- Headquarters: Atlanta, Georgia, United States
- Number of locations: 6,000 (2023)
- Owner: Genuine Parts Company
- Website: napaonline.com

The National Automotive Parts Association (NAPA, also known as NAPA Auto Parts), is an American retailers' cooperative distributing automotive replacement parts, accessories, and service items throughout North America. Established in 1925, NAPA is a division of Atlanta-based Genuine Parts Company.

== Company History ==
NAPA Auto Parts was established in 1925 in Atlanta, Georgia. Some NAPA Auto Parts stores are owned and operated by GPC, but most are independently owned and operated.

NAPA launched its first store in Australia in 2017.

== Operations ==
There are over 6,000 NAPA Auto Parts stores in the United States, approximately 1,500 of which are owned by Genuine Parts Company. The remainder are independently owned. 15,000 NAPA AutoCare repair facilities are in operation which provide vehicle maintenance and repair services.

Outside the United States, NAPA operates in Canada through the UAP (United Auto Parts) division of Genuine Parts Company and NAPA Autopro repair facilities in Canada, Mexico and other locations throughout the Caribbean and Latin America.

As of 2020, the NAPA brand includes 12 stores operating in Australia. Seven other businesses owned by General Parts Company, including Ashdown-Ingram and Covs, have been rebranded under the NAPA name.

== Sponsorships ==
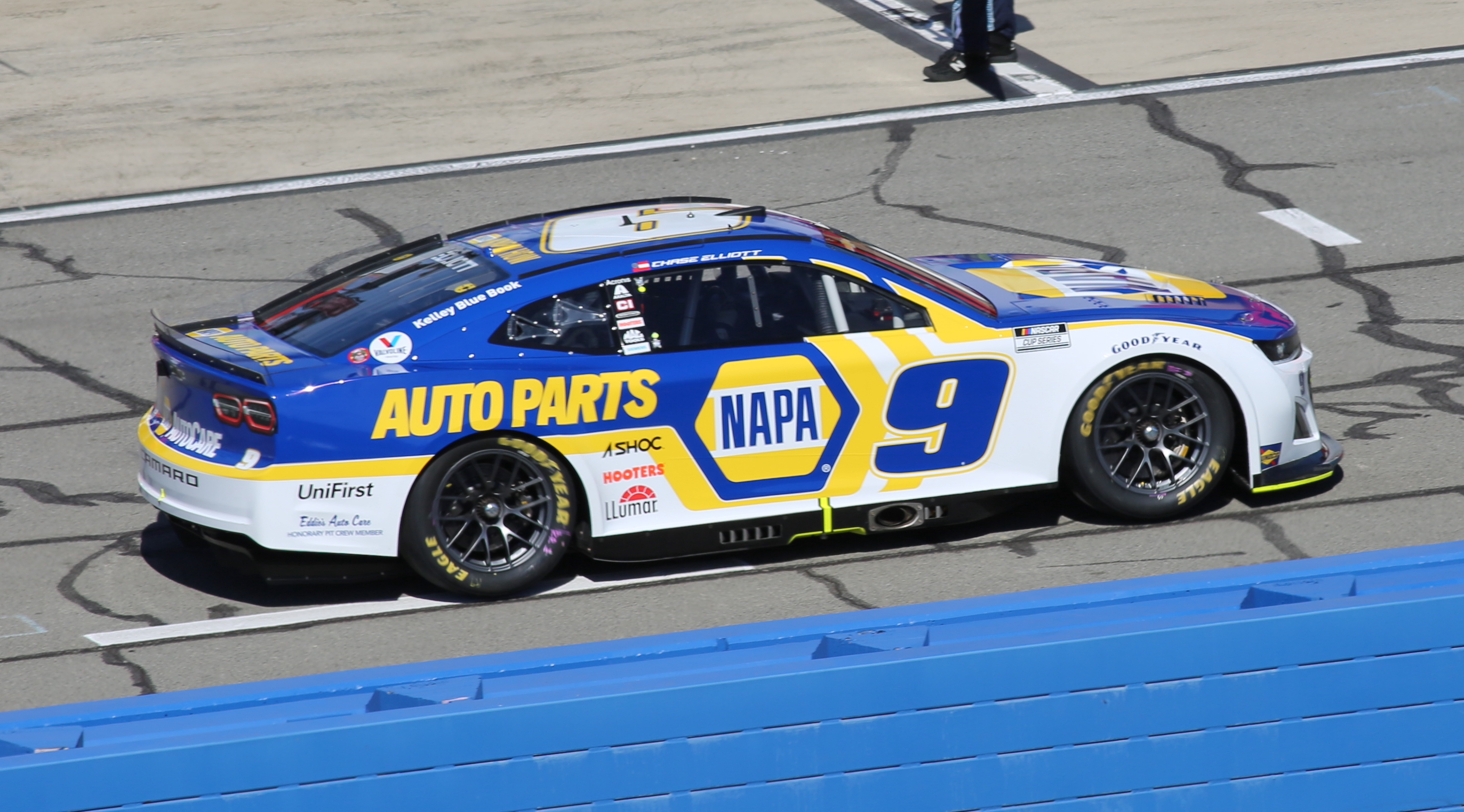
Chase Elliott's No. 9 NAPA Auto Parts Chevrolet at Auto Club Speedway in 2022

NAPA has sponsored auto racing drivers and teams. It sponsored Kelly Moore and Moore Racing during the early 2000s. NAPA began sponsoring Michael Waltrip (initially via Dale Earnhardt, Inc. and later Bill Davis Racing) in 2001, and continued with Michael Waltrip Racing (MWR) in 2007. In 2010, NAPA sponsored MWR and Ryan Truex for the K&N Pro Series East. NAPA ended a three-year agreement with MWR to sponsor Martin Truex Jr.'s No. 56 Toyota Camry in the NASCAR Cup Series after one season, following a team orders scandal during the 2013 Federated Auto Parts 400.

NAPA became an associate sponsor of Ron Capps and Don Schumacher Racing in 2007, and upgraded to primary sponsor status in 2008. The partnership shared 43 wins and championships in 2016 and 2021, and NAPA became a sponsor of Ron Capps Motorsports when Capps became a team owner in late 2021. NAPA began sponsoring Chase Elliott's No. 9 Chevrolet Camaro and Hendrick Motorsports in 2014. In 2016, NAPA became the majority sponsor of Elliott and the No. 24 Chevrolet team in the Cup Series with Hendrick, and in 2020, the agreement was extended through the 2022 season. NAPA also began sponsoring Alexander Rossi and cars for Andretti Autosport in the IndyCar Series in 2016. The company has also sponsored McAnally–Hilgemann Racing.

Outside of motorsports, NAPA sponsors the Atlanta Braves and Atlanta United FC. Previously, NAPA was a sponsor of Major League Soccer via Soccer United Marketing and the Mexico national football team, starting in 2007. NAPA was the title sponsor of arena football's ArenaBowl XXIII in 2010.

== See also ==
- Advance Auto Parts
- Carquest
- O'Reilly Auto Parts
- Pep Boys
- Certified Automotive Parts Association
