= Certified Automotive Parts Association =

The Certified Automotive Parts Association (CAPA) is a non-profit certification organization established in 1987 to develop and oversee a testing program for aftermarket automotive parts. CAPA was created by automobile insurance companies. It was created to control the market on parts used by insurance company contracted collision shops. It gave the insurance companies an alternative to high priced OEM parts. CAPA encourages competition in the marketplace in the hope that their program will ultimately reduce expense to the consumer and the industry while increasing and assuring part quality.

== Material Standards ==
CAPA quality standards apply to various types of parts made from different materials. CAPA is constantly expanding the certification program to include more parts and new materials. Currently, three specifications that set quality standards for

- metal (CAPA 101),
- plastic (CAPA 201) and
- lighting (CAPA 301)

are in place. Each specification provides detailed testing and inspection procedures to ensure the quality of the parts covered by that specification. Where possible, all test procedures refer to the nationally recognized tests such as those of ASTM and SAE.

== See also ==
- National Automotive Parts Association
