= Max Q Motorsports =

Former NASCAR team

- Owner: Larry Gunselman
- Series: Sprint Cup Series
- Race drivers: Todd Bodine, Larry Gunselman, Geoff Bodine, Tony Raines, Mike Wallace, Derrike Cope, Chad McCumbee, Landon Cassill, Josh Wise, Jeff Green, Robert Richardson Jr., Mike Bliss, Chris Cook, Tomy Drissi, Scott Speed, Erik Darnell, Mike Skinner, Timmy Hill, J. J. Yeley, Dave Blaney, Bobby Labonte
- Manufacturer: Chevrolet; Toyota; Ford
- Opened: 2009
- Closed: 2013

Career
- Debut: 2009 Shelby 427 (Las Vegas)
- Latest race: 2013 Toyota/Save Mart 350 (Sonoma)
- Races competed: 53
- Drivers' Championships: 0
- Race victories: 0
- Pole positions: 0

Max Q Motorsports (formerly Gunselman Motorsports) was a NASCAR Sprint Cup Series team owned by former driver Larry Gunselman. It fielded cars between 2009 and 2013. The team's car numbers are 37 and 64.

== Sprint Cup Series ==
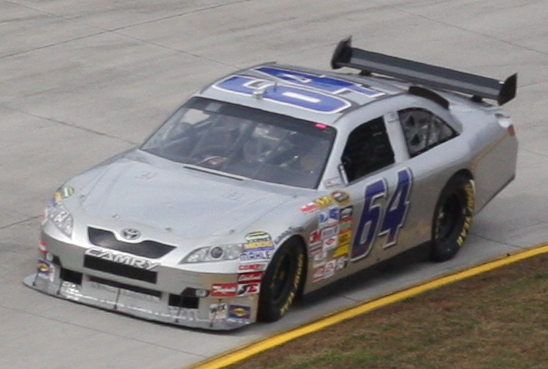
Derrike Cope in the No. 64 at Martinsville Speedway in 2009

=== Car No. 64 history (2009-2011) ===
The team first attempted to field the No. 64 Toyota at the 2009 Daytona 500 for Geoff Bodine. Although he missed the race, Geoff's brother Todd Bodine made the race at Las Vegas Motor Speedway for the team's first start. The team finished 37th, 58 laps down. Todd would run two other races, garnering a 42nd and 43rd before leaving the team before the first Pocono race. Gunselman then signed Mike Wallace to run a limited schedule the rest of the year. In the remainder of the season, Wallace made two races for the team. His finishes were 43rd and 39th. At Martinsville Speedway, Derrike Cope took over Gunselman's car for one race. The team qualified 43rd and finished 42nd. In 2009, the team made six races in eighteen attempts and did not finish a single one (two engine failures, two brake issues, one crash, and one instance of being parked).

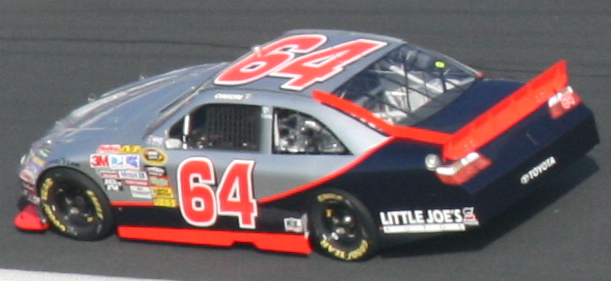
Todd Bodine in the No. 64 at Charlotte Motor Speedway in 2010

The team's first race of 2010 was at Richmond in a Toyota with Tony Raines driving. Chad McCumbee, Landon Cassill, Jeff Green and Todd Bodine also competed for the team. Gunselman Motorsports ran in 2010 as a Start and Park team, with support from Germain Racing.

For 2011, Todd Bodine was intended to run with Gunselman for the Daytona 500. However, Germain Racing fielded their own No. 60 Toyota for Bodine. Former Daytona 500 winner Derrike Cope drove the No. 64 Toyota in the Bud Shootout, but failed to qualify the Daytona 500 with sponsorship from Sta-Bil Ethanol Treatment. Max Q would go on to end its affiliation with Germain Racing and Toyota following Daytona. After Daytona, the No. 64 became Max Q’s secondary team, with the new No. 37 becoming the primary. The team only chose to field the No. 64 one additional time, which was at the Sprint Showdown. Cope again drove the car, but was involved in a crash with Landon Cassill.

=== Car No. 37 history (2011-2013) ===
After the Daytona 500 in 2011, Max Q Motorsports struck a deal with Front Row Motorsports to acquire the No. 37 car. The No. 37 became the primary team for Max Q, with Tony Raines driving. Max Q inherited the owners points from 2010, guaranteeing a spot through the 5th race of 2011, as well as crew chief Greg Connor, the pit crew, and some equipment. The cars are former FRM cars, sourced from the Max Q Motorsports shop and the team has their own personnel. Tony Raines scored top 25 finishes at Phoenix and at Martinsville. The team picked up sponsorship from BlackCat Fireworks for several races during the summer months. The team has started and parked since the 10th race of the season at Darlington after falling out of the top-35 and missing races. Chris Cook drove the No. 37 after a deal with Tomy Drissi and Rick Ware Racing fell through when Drissi was not approved to race at Sonoma. Scott Speed drove the No. 37 at Indy, Pocono, and Watkins Glen, Speed would go on to join Whitney Motorsports full-time following Watkins Glen. Josh Wise made his Sprint Cup debut in the car at Chicago, and has continued to drive for the team following that race. Veteran NASCAR driver Mike Skinner ran the car at Martinsville on October 30, 2011.

For 2012, the No. 37 team planned to return full-time in an alliance with Rick Ware Racing. Mike Wallace unsuccessfully attempted the Daytona 500. 2011 Nationwide Series Rookie of the Year Timmy Hill took over in March. The team had full sponsorship from Poynt, a free mobile app available from the App Store.

Max Q Motorsports scaled back their schedule in April after the team failed to make five of the first six races, including a disqualification at Martinsville after failing post-qualifying inspection, and a deal for Rick Ware to purchase the team fell through. Their only start was at Las Vegas, where Hill finished 42nd after a crash. Midway through the season they entered into a technical agreement with Tommy Baldwin Racing, signing J. J. Yeley to drive the No. 37. Max Q Motorsports started and parked most of the remainder of the season, but went the distance at Homestead with a 35th-place finish.

After 2012, Yeley departed for Tommy Baldwin Racing for the 2013 season. Yeley had start-and-parked for most of 2012 and was quick to take a ride in which he could race full races. With the loss of its fifth primary driver since the team formed in 2009, Max Q effectively shut down before the 2013 season.

The No. 37 did make a single appearance at Sonoma, being fielded in an alliance with Baldwin to allow Yeley to race while his regular car, the No. 36, was fielded by Victor Gonzalez, Jr. However, because the team was a late entry, they did not receive driver or owner points. Yeley finished 42nd.

In 2014, TBR acquired the No. 37 outright, with Bobby Labonte driving the car at Indianapolis. This officially marked the end of Max Q's participation in NASCAR, because although the 2013 entry had used Max Q's paint style, the 2014 entry used TBR's with Baldwin sponsor Accell Construction on board.

==== Car No. 64/37 results ====
NASCAR Sprint Cup Series results
Year	Driver	No.	Make	1	2	3	4	5	6	7	8	9	10	11	12	13	14	15	16	17	18	19	20	21	22	23	24	25	26	27	28	29	30	31	32	33	34	35	36	Owners	Pts
2009	Geoff Bodine	64	Toyota	DAY; DNQ			ATL; DNQ																																	47th	487
2009	Todd Bodine	64	Toyota		CAL; DNQ	LVS; 37		BRI; 42	MAR; 43	TEX; DNQ	PHO; DNQ	TAL	RCH; DNQ	DAR	CLT; DNQ	DOV																								47th	487
2009	Mike Wallace	64	Toyota														POC; DNQ	MCH	SON	NHA; Wth	DAY; DNQ	CHI; DNQ	IND	POC; 43	GLN	MCH	BRI; DNQ	ATL	RCH	NHA; 39	DOV	KAN	CAL; DNQ	CLT						47th	487
2009	Derrike Cope	64	Toyota																																MAR; 42	TAL	TEX	PHO	HOM	47th	487
2010	Tony Raines	64	Toyota	DAY	CAL	LVS	ATL	BRI	MAR	PHO	TEX	TAL	RCH; 42																											46th	873
2010	Todd Bodine	64	Toyota											DAR; 39	DOV; DNQ	CLT; 40		MCH; 42	SON	NHA; 40	DAY; DNQ	CHI; DNQ	IND; 37	POC; 37	GLN	MCH	BRI; 41	ATL; DNQ	RCH; DNQ											46th	873
2010	Chad McCumbee	64	Toyota														POC; 42																							46th	873
2010	Landon Cassill	64	Toyota																											NHA; 42		KAN; 43	CAL; 40		MAR; 42	TAL; DNQ		PHO; 40	HOM; 40	46th	873
2010	Josh Wise	64	Toyota																												DOV; DNQ									46th	873
2010	Jeff Green	64	Toyota																															CLT; 41			TEX; DNQ			46th	873
2011	Derrike Cope	64	Toyota	DAY; DNQ																																				61st	0
2011	Tony Raines	37	Ford		PHO; 25	LVS; 35	BRI; 28	CAL; 36	MAR; 25	TEX; 34	TAL; DNQ	RCH; 33	DAR; 36	DOV; 35	CLT; DNQ	KAN; DNQ	POC; 36	MCH; DNQ		DAY; DNQ	KEN; 38	NHA; DNQ				MCH; 38		ATL; DNQ												39th	186
2011	Chris Cook	37	Ford																SON; 27																					39th	186
2011	Scott Speed	37	Ford																				IND; 39	POC; 40	GLN; 39															39th	186
2011	Jeff Green	37	Ford																								BRI; DNQ													39th	186
2011	Erik Darnell	37	Ford																										RCH; DNQ											39th	186
2011	Josh Wise	37	Ford																											CHI; 42	NHA; 39	DOV; 37	KAN; DNQ	CLT; DNQ	TAL; DNQ					39th	186
2011	Mike Skinner	37	Ford																																	MAR; 43	TEX; 41	PHO; 42	HOM; DNQ	39th	186
2012	Mike Wallace	37	Ford	DAY; DNQ																																				47th	30
2012	Timmy Hill	37	Ford		PHO; DNQ	LVS; 42	BRI; DNQ	CAL; DNQ																																47th	30
2012	Tony Raines	37	Ford						MAR; DNQ	TEX	KAN	RCH	TAL	DAR	CLT	DOV	POC	MCH	SON	KEN	DAY	NHA	IND																	47th	30
2012	J. J. Yeley	37	Chevy																					POC; 40	GLN	MCH; DNQ	BRI; DNQ	ATL; 40	RCH; DNQ	CHI; DNQ	NHA; 41			CLT; 42	KAN; 42	MAR; DNQ	TEX; 42	PHO; DNQ	HOM; 35	47th	30
2012	Dave Blaney	37	Chevy																													DOV; 41	TAL							47th	30
2013	J. J. Yeley	37	Chevy	DAY	PHO	LVS	BRI	CAL	MAR	TEX	KAN	RCH	TAL	DAR	CLT	DOV	POC	MCH	SON; 42	KEN	DAY	NHA	IND	POC	GLN	MCH	BRI	ATL	RCH	CHI	NHA	DOV	KAN	CLT	TAL	MAR	TEX	PHO	HOM	50th	0
