= 2011 Tums Fast Relief 500 =

2011 TUMS Fast Relief 500
Race details
- Race 33 of 36 in the 2011 NASCAR Sprint Cup Series
- Date: October 30, 2011
- Location: Martinsville Speedway in Ridgeway, Virginia, United States
- Course: Permanent racing facility
- Course length: 0.526 miles (0.847 km)
- Distance: 500 laps, 263 mi (423 km)
- Weather: Mostly sunny with a high around 60; wind out of the NNE at 4 mph.

Pole position
| Driver | Carl Edwards | Roush Fenway Racing |

Most laps led
| Driver | Kyle Busch | Joe Gibbs Racing |
- Laps: 125

Winner
| No. 14 | Tony Stewart | Stewart–Haas Racing |

Television in the United States
- Network: ESPN
- Announcers: Allen Bestwick, Dale Jarrett and Andy Petree

The 2011 Tums Fast Relief 500 was a NASCAR Sprint Cup Series race held on October 30, 2011, at Martinsville Speedway in Ridgeway, Virginia. Contested over 500 laps on the 0.526-mile (847 m) oval, it was the 33rd race of the 2011 Sprint Cup Series season, as well as the seventh race in the ten-race Chase for the Sprint Cup, which ends the season. The race was won by Tony Stewart for the Stewart–Haas Racing team. Jimmie Johnson finished second, and Jeff Gordon clinched third.

== Report ==
=== Background ===
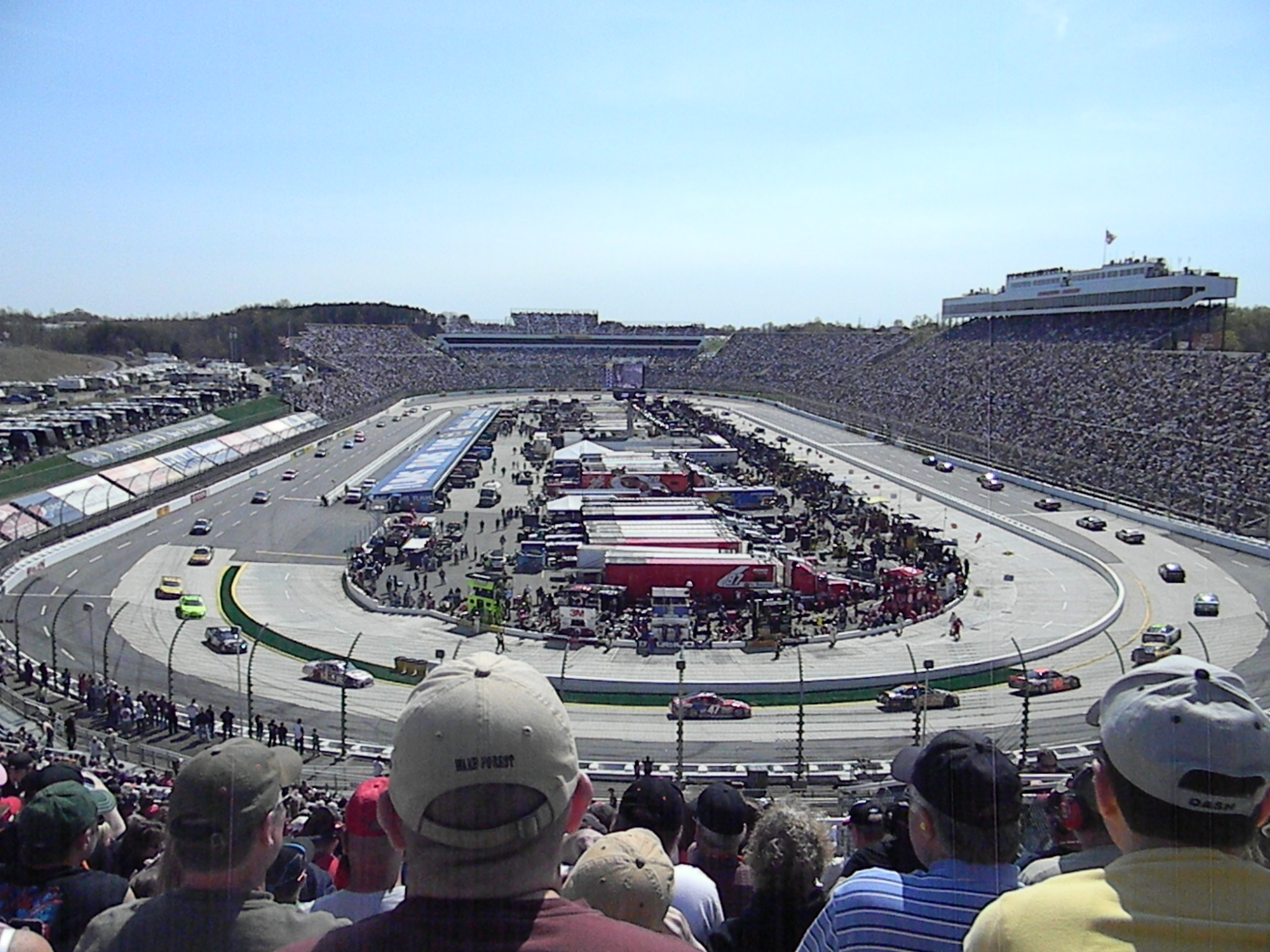
Martinsville Speedway, the race track where the race was held.

Martinsville Speedway is one of five short tracks to hold NASCAR races. The standard track at Martinsville Speedway is a four-turn short track oval that is 0.526 miles (0.847 km) long. The track's turns are banked at eleven degrees, while the front stretch, the location of the finish line, is banked at zero degrees. The back stretch also has s zero degree banking. The racetrack has seats for 63,000 spectators.

Before the race, Carl Edwards led the Drivers' Championship with 2,237 points, and Matt Kenseth stood in second with 2,223 points. Brad Keselowski followed in third with 2,219 points, one ahead of Tony Stewart and eight ahead of Kevin Harvick in fourth and fifth. Kyle Busch with 2,197 was ten points ahead of Jimmie Johnson, as Kurt Busch with 2,185 points, was 22 ahead of Dale Earnhardt Jr., and 30 in front of Jeff Gordon. Denny Hamlin and Ryan Newman was eleventh and twelfth with 2,153 and 2,149 points. In the Manufacturers' Championship, Chevrolet was leading with 217 points, 44 points ahead of Ford. Toyota, with 164 points, was 14 points ahead of Dodge in the battle for third. Hamlin was the race's defending champion.

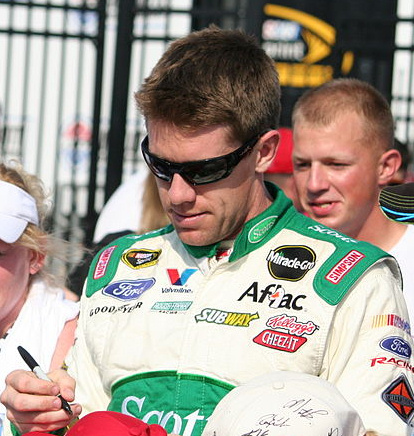
Carl Edwards was given the pole position after qualifying was cancelled

=== Practice and qualifying ===
Two 90 minute practice sessions were scheduled to be held on Friday in preparation for the race. However, wet track conditions postponed and combined the sessions into one practice session on Saturday. Afterward, the only session was delayed because of the wet track conditions. Once the first and only session of practice began, Michael McDowell was quickest with a time of 19.747 seconds in the first session, 0.023 seconds faster than Clint Bowyer. Johnson was just off Bowyer's pace, followed by Carl Jamie McMurray, Scott Speed, and Paul Menard. David Stremme was seventh, still within a tenth of a second of McDowell's time. Also in the session, there was a collision involving Harvick and Greg Biffle. Neither car was severely damaged from the incident.

Forty-five cars were entered for qualifying, but only forty-three could qualify for the race because of NASCAR's qualifying procedure. Wet track conditions before the scheduled starting time canceled the session, causing the grid to be created by Owners' Championship points. Edwards was given the pole position. He was joined on the front row of the grid by Kenseth. Keselowski started third, Stewart took fourth, and Harvick fifth. Kyle Busch, Johnson, Kurt Busch, Earnhardt Jr. and Gordon completed the top ten. The two drivers that failed to qualify for the race were Dennis Setzer and Derrike Cope. Afterward, Edwards commented:

"We hope to have a good run here. We're leaning on Matt Kenseth’s success here from the last race and how well he ran, and I feel that we've got a good car, but you never know. This place has been a really tough racetrack for me and for our team, but we have had some really good runs here, and Matt's good run in the spring is really what gives us the confidence we have here, and, hopefully, we can go run well and keep this points lead or extend it moving forward toward some tracks that we're really confident about."

=== Race ===
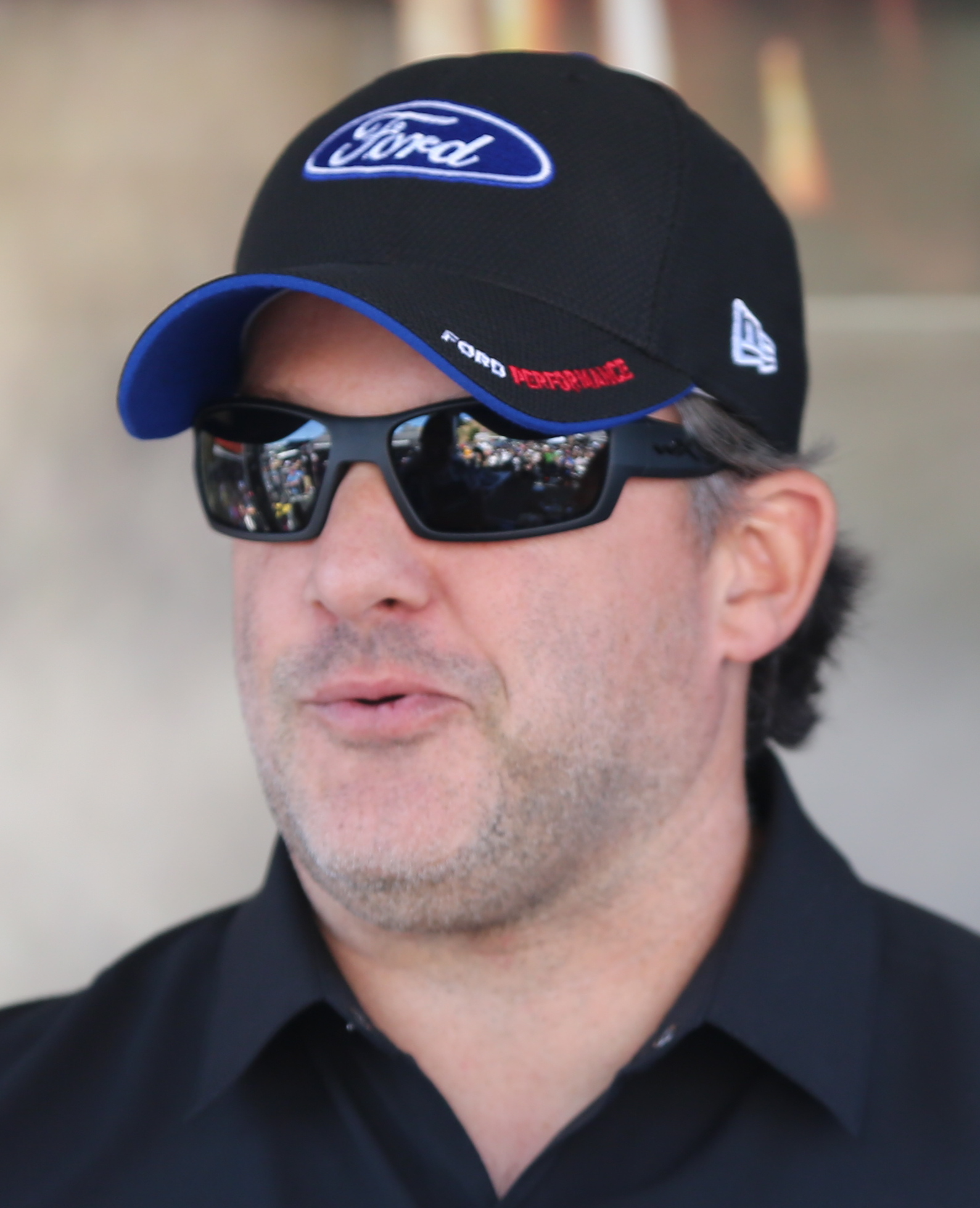
Tony Stewart won the race.

The race, the 33rd in the season, began at 2:00 p.m. EDT and was televised live in the United States on ESPN. The conditions on the grid were dry before the race with the air temperature around 50 °F (10 °C). Tony Beach, associate Pastor at Ft. Trial Baptist Church in Stanleytown, Virginia, began pre-race ceremonies by giving the invocation. Next, North Carolina A&T State University marching band performed the national anthem, and Ashley Young, winner of the Tums Sweepstakes, gave the command for drivers to start their engines. A late race caution set up a restart with 3 laps remaining, with Jimmie Johnson and Tony Stewart on the front row. Johnson chose the heavily-favored inside line, but Stewart had a great restart and cleared Johnson off of Turn 4 coming to 2 to go. Brad Keselowski was spun out on the restart, but was able to get back going and NASCAR decided not to throw the caution. Stewart would go on to win the race, his 3rd race victory of the 2011 season, all of them coming during the Chase.

== Results ==
=== Qualifying ===
| Grid | No. | Driver | Team | Manufacturer |
|---|---|---|---|---|
| 1 | 99 | Carl Edwards | Roush Fenway Racing | Ford |
| 2 | 17 | Matt Kenseth | Roush Fenway Racing | Ford |
| 3 | 2 | Brad Keselowski | Penske Racing | Dodge |
| 4 | 14 | Tony Stewart | Stewart–Haas Racing | Chevrolet |
| 5 | 29 | Kevin Harvick | Richard Childress Racing | Chevrolet |
| 6 | 18 | Kyle Busch | Joe Gibbs Racing | Toyota |
| 7 | 48 | Jimmie Johnson | Hendrick Motorsports | Chevrolet |
| 8 | 22 | Kurt Busch | Penske Racing | Dodge |
| 9 | 88 | Dale Earnhardt Jr. | Hendrick Motorsports | Chevrolet |
| 10 | 24 | Jeff Gordon | Hendrick Motorsports | Chevrolet |
| 11 | 11 | Denny Hamlin | Joe Gibbs Racing | Toyota |
| 12 | 39 | Ryan Newman | Stewart–Haas Racing | Chevrolet |
| 13 | 33 | Clint Bowyer | Richard Childress Racing | Chevrolet |
| 14 | 4 | Kasey Kahne | Red Bull Racing Team | Toyota |
| 15 | 16 | Greg Biffle | Roush Fenway Racing | Ford |
| 16 | 43 | A. J. Allmendinger | Richard Petty Motorsports | Ford |
| 17 | 9 | Marcos Ambrose | Richard Petty Motorsports | Ford |
| 18 | 6 | David Ragan | Roush Fenway Racing | Ford |
| 19 | 5 | Mark Martin | Hendrick Motorsports | Chevrolet |
| 20 | 42 | Juan Pablo Montoya | Earnhardt Ganassi Racing | Chevrolet |
| 21 | 27 | Paul Menard | Richard Childress Racing | Chevrolet |
| 22 | 20 | Joey Logano | Joe Gibbs Racing | Toyota |
| 23 | 31 | Jeff Burton | Richard Childress Racing | Chevrolet |
| 24 | 56 | Martin Truex Jr. | Michael Waltrip Racing | Toyota |
| 25 | 83 | Brian Vickers | Red Bull Racing Team | Toyota |
| 26 | 78 | Regan Smith | Furniture Row Racing | Chevrolet |
| 27 | 1 | Jamie McMurray | Earnhardt Ganassi Racing | Chevrolet |
| 28 | 00 | David Reutimann | Michael Waltrip Racing | Toyota |
| 29 | 47 | Bobby Labonte | JTG Daugherty Racing | Toyota |
| 30 | 51 | Landon Cassill | Phoenix Racing | Chevrolet |
| 31 | 34 | David Gilliland | Front Row Motorsports | Ford |
| 32 | 36 | Dave Blaney | Tommy Baldwin Racing | Chevrolet |
| 33 | 13 | Casey Mears | Germain Racing | Toyota |
| 34 | 32 | Ken Schrader | FAS Lane Racing | Ford |
| 35 | 38 | Travis Kvapil | Front Row Motorsports | Ford |
| 36 | 71 | Hermie Sadler | TRG Motorsports | Ford |
| 37 | 7 | Reed Sorenson | Robby Gordon Motorsports | Dodge |
| 38 | 37 | Mike Skinner | Max Q Motorsports | Ford |
| 39 | 46 | Scott Speed | Whitney Motorsports | Ford |
| 40 | 66 | Michael McDowell | HP Racing | Toyota |
| 41 | 87 | Joe Nemechek | NEMCO Motorsports | Toyota |
| 42 | 30 | David Stremme | Inception Motorsports | Chevrolet |
| 43 | 55 | J. J. Yeley | Front Row Motorsports | Ford |
Failed to Qualify
| | 92 | Dennis Setzer | K-Automotive Motorsports | Chevrolet |
| | 75 | Derrike Cope | Stratus Racing Group | Dodge |
Note: Since qualifying was cancelled, there were no time trials.

=== Race results ===
| Pos | Grid | Car | Driver | Team | Manufacturer | Laps Run | Points |
|---|---|---|---|---|---|---|---|
| 1 | 4 | 14 | Tony Stewart | Stewart–Haas Racing | Chevrolet | 500 | 47 |
| 2 | 7 | 48 | Jimmie Johnson | Hendrick Motorsports | Chevrolet | 500 | 43 |
| 3 | 10 | 24 | Jeff Gordon | Hendrick Motorsports | Chevrolet | 500 | 42 |
| 4 | 5 | 29 | Kevin Harvick | Richard Childress Racing | Chevrolet | 500 | 41 |
| 5 | 11 | 11 | Denny Hamlin | Joe Gibbs Racing | Toyota | 500 | 40 |
| 6 | 23 | 31 | Jeff Burton | Richard Childress Racing | Chevrolet | 500 | 38 |
| 7 | 9 | 88 | Dale Earnhardt Jr. | Hendrick Motorsports | Chevrolet | 500 | 37 |
| 8 | 24 | 56 | Martin Truex Jr. | Michael Waltrip Racing | Toyota | 500 | 36 |
| 9 | 1 | 99 | Carl Edwards | Roush Fenway Racing | Ford | 500 | 36 |
| 10 | 12 | 39 | Ryan Newman | Stewart–Haas Racing | Chevrolet | 500 | 35 |
| 11 | 16 | 43 | A. J. Allmendinger | Richard Petty Motorsports | Ford | 500 | 34 |
| 12 | 33 | 13 | Casey Mears | Germain Racing | Toyota | 500 | 32 |
| 13 | 26 | 78 | Regan Smith | Furniture Row Racing | Chevrolet | 500 | 31 |
| 14 | 8 | 22 | Kurt Busch | Penske Racing | Dodge | 500 | 30 |
| 15 | 15 | 16 | Greg Biffle | Roush Fenway Racing | Ford | 500 | 29 |
| 16 | 35 | 38 | Travis Kvapil | Front Row Motorsports | Ford | 500 | 0 |
| 17 | 3 | 2 | Brad Keselowski | Penske Racing | Dodge | 500 | 27 |
| 18 | 22 | 20 | Joey Logano | Joe Gibbs Racing | Toyota | 500 | 26 |
| 19 | 13 | 33 | Clint Bowyer | Richard Childress Racing | Chevrolet | 500 | 25 |
| 20 | 28 | 00 | David Reutimann | Michael Waltrip Racing | Toyota | 500 | 24 |
| 21 | 34 | 32 | Ken Schrader | FAS Lane Racing | Ford | 500 | 23 |
| 22 | 20 | 42 | Juan Pablo Montoya | Earnhardt Ganassi Racing | Chevrolet | 497 | 22 |
| 23 | 32 | 36 | Dave Blaney | Tommy Baldwin Racing | Chevrolet | 497 | 21 |
| 24 | 21 | 27 | Paul Menard | Richard Childress Racing | Chevrolet | 497 | 21 |
| 25 | 14 | 4 | Kasey Kahne | Red Bull Racing Team | Toyota | 495 | 19 |
| 26 | 36 | 71 | Hermie Sadler | TRG Motorsports | Ford | 493 | 0 |
| 27 | 6 | 18 | Kyle Busch | Joe Gibbs Racing | Toyota | 493 | 19 |
| 28 | 19 | 5 | Mark Martin | Hendrick Motorsports | Chevrolet | 491 | 16 |
| 29 | 17 | 9 | Marcos Ambrose | Richard Petty Motorsports | Ford | 488 | 15 |
| 30 | 25 | 83 | Brian Vickers | Red Bull Racing Team | Toyota | 484 | 14 |
| 31 | 2 | 17 | Matt Kenseth | Roush Fenway Racing | Ford | 477 | 14 |
| 32 | 29 | 47 | Bobby Labonte | JTG Daugherty Racing | Toyota | 464 | 12 |
| 33 | 18 | 6 | David Ragan | Roush Fenway Racing | Ford | 444 | 11 |
| 34 | 31 | 34 | David Gilliland | Front Row Motorsports | Ford | 357 | 11 |
| 35 | 27 | 1 | Jamie McMurray | Earnhardt Ganassi Racing | Chevrolet | 85 | 9 |
| 36 | 37 | 7 | Reed Sorenson | Robby Gordon Motorsports | Dodge | 77 | 0 |
| 37 | 39 | 46 | Scott Speed | Whitney Motorsports | Ford | 74 | 0 |
| 38 | 42 | 30 | David Stremme | Inception Motorsports | Chevrolet | 52 | 6 |
| 39 | 40 | 66 | Michael McDowell | HP Racing | Toyota | 45 | 0 |
| 40 | 43 | 55 | J. J. Yeley | Front Row Motorsports | Ford | 40 | 4 |
| 41 | 41 | 87 | Joe Nemechek | NEMCO Motorsports | Toyota | 33 | 0 |
| 42 | 30 | 51 | Landon Cassill | Phoenix Racing | Chevrolet | 27 | 0 |
| 43 | 38 | 37 | Mike Skinner | Max Q Motorsports | Ford | 7 | 0 |

== Standings after the race ==
Drivers' Championship standings

| Pos | Driver | Points |
|---|---|---|
| 1 | Carl Edwards | 2,273 |
| 2 | Tony Stewart | 2,265 |
| 3 | Kevin Harvick | 2,252 |
| 4 | Brad Keselowski | 2,246 |
| 5 | Matt Kenseth | 2,237 |
| 6 | Jimmie Johnson | 2,230 |
| 7 | Kyle Busch | 2,216 |
| 8 | Kurt Busch | 2,215 |
| 9 | Dale Earnhardt Jr. | 2,200 |
| 10 | Jeff Gordon | 2,197 |
| 11 | Denny Hamlin | 2,193 |
| 12 | Ryan Newman | 2,184 |

Manufacturers' Championship standings

| Pos | Manufacturer | Points |
|---|---|---|
| 1 | Chevrolet | 226 |
| 2 | Ford | 177 |
| 3 | Toyota | 170 |
| 4 | Dodge | 153 |

- Note: Only the top twelve positions are included for the driver standings.

| Previous race: 2011 Good Sam Club 500 | Sprint Cup Series; 2011 season | Next race: 2011 AAA Texas 500 |
