= 2012 Good Sam Roadside Assistance 500 =

Race details
- Race 30 of 36 in the 2012 NASCAR Sprint Cup Series
- 2012 Good Sam Roadside Assistance 500 program cover
- Date: October 7, 2012
- Location: Talladega Superspeedway, Talladega, Alabama, United States
- Course: Permanent racing facility
- Course length: 2.66 miles (4.281 km)
- Distance: 189 laps, 502.74 mi (809.082 km)
- Scheduled distance: 188 laps, 500.08 mi (804.801 km)
- Weather: Temperatures reaching up to 62.1 °F (16.7 °C); wind speeds up to 11.1 miles per hour (17.9 km/h)
- Average speed: 171.194 miles per hour (275.510 km/h)

Pole position
Driver	Kasey Kahne	Hendrick Motorsports
- Time: 50.017

Most laps led
Driver	Jamie McMurray	Earnhardt Ganassi Racing
- Laps: 39

Winner
No. 17	Matt Kenseth	Roush-Fenway Racing

Television in the United States
- Network: ESPN
- Announcers: Allen Bestwick, Dale Jarrett and Andy Petree

The 2012 Good Sam Roadside Assistance 500 was a NASCAR Sprint Cup Series stock car race held on October 7, 2012, at Talladega Superspeedway in Talladega, Alabama, United States. Contested over 189 laps on the 2.66-mile (4.28-kilometre) asphalt tri-oval, it was the thirtieth race of the 2012 NASCAR Sprint Cup Series, as well as the fourth race in the ten-race Chase for the Sprint Cup, which ends the season.

Matt Kenseth of Roush Fenway Racing won the race, his second of the season, and snapped a twenty-nine race winless streak extending back to the Daytona 500; while Jeff Gordon finished second and Kyle Busch finished third. The Big One hit the field on the final lap, collecting 25 cars in turn four, with Tony Stewart flying in the air after being accidentally tagged by Michael Waltrip, who in turn was being pushed by Casey Mears.

== Report ==
=== Background ===
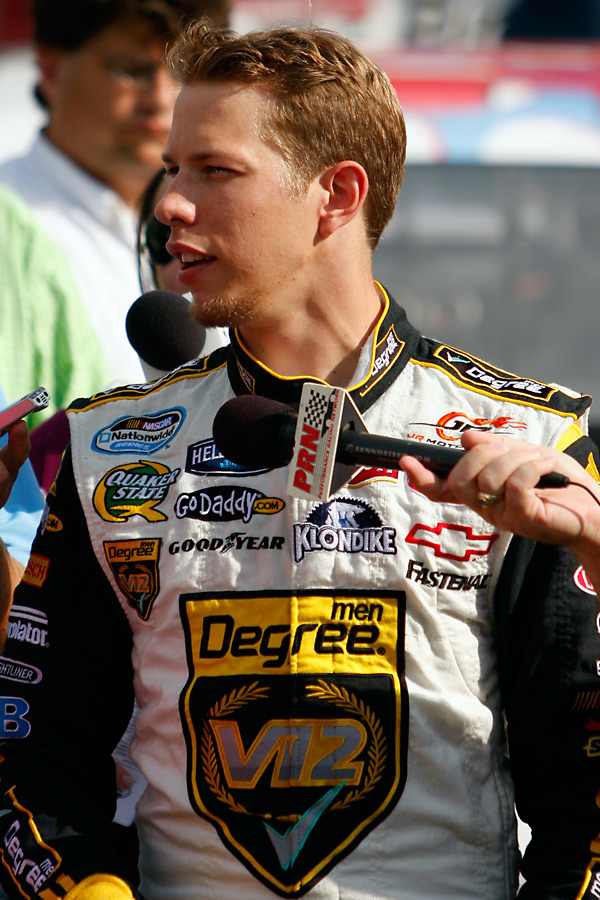
Brad Keselowski entered the race as the Driver's Championship leader.

An aerial view of Talladega Superspeedway, the venue where the race was held.

Talladega Superspeedway is one of six superspeedways to hold NASCAR races; the others are Daytona International Speedway, Auto Club Speedway, Indianapolis Motor Speedway, Pocono Raceway and Michigan International Speedway. The standard track at the speedway is a four-turn superspeedway that is 2.66 miles (4.28 km) long. The track's turns are banked at thirty-three degrees, while the front stretch, the location of the finish line, is banked at 16.5 degrees. The back stretch has a two-degree banking. Talladega Superspeedway can seat up to 143,231 people.

Before the race, Brad Keselowski led the Drivers' Championship with 2,142 points, and Jimmie Johnson stood in second with 2,137 points. Denny Hamlin followed in third with 2,126 points, nine points ahead of Clint Bowyer and sixteen ahead of Tony Stewart in fourth and fifth. Kasey Kahne with 2,110 was seven points ahead of Dale Earnhardt Jr., as Martin Truex Jr. with 2,100 points, was four points ahead of Kevin Harvick, and six in front of Jeff Gordon. Greg Biffle and Matt Kenseth was eleventh and twelfth with 2,091 and 2,070 points, respectively.

In the Manufacturers' Championship, Chevrolet was leading with 197 points, twenty-five points ahead of Toyota. Ford, with 138 points, was seven points ahead of Dodge in the battle for third. Clint Bowyer is the race's defending champion after winning the event in 2011.

=== Qualifying results ===
Pos.	No.	Driver	Make	Time	Avg. Speed (mph)
1	5	Kasey Kahne	Chevrolet	50.017	191.455
2	39	Ryan Newman	Chevrolet	50.098	191.145
3	15	Clint Bowyer	Toyota	50.105	191.119
4	14	Tony Stewart	Chevrolet	50.138	190.993
5	16	Greg Biffle	Ford	50.148	190.955
6	24	Jeff Gordon	Chevrolet	50.176	190.848
7	99	Carl Edwards	Ford	50.193	190.784
8	21	Trevor Bayne	Ford	50.208	190.727
9	56	Martin Truex Jr.	Toyota	50.225	190.662
10	22	Sam Hornish Jr.	Dodge	50.234	190.628
11	55	Michael Waltrip	Toyota	50.277	190.465
12	88	Dale Earnhardt Jr.	Chevrolet	50.287	190.427
13	18	Kyle Busch	Toyota	50.289	190.419
14	20	Joey Logano	Toyota	50.296	190.393
15	17	Matt Kenseth	Ford	50.302	190.370
16	27	Paul Menard	Chevrolet	50.312	190.332
17	48	Jimmie Johnson	Chevrolet	50.321	190.298
18	43	Aric Almirola	Ford	50.321	190.298
19	13	Casey Mears	Ford	50.353	190.177
20	9	Marcos Ambrose	Ford	50.355	190.170
21	29	Kevin Harvick	Chevrolet	50.370	190.113
22	2	Brad Keselowski	Dodge	50.459	189.778
23	11	Denny Hamlin	Toyota	50.467	189.748
24	1	Jamie McMurray	Chevrolet	50.469	189.740
25	34	David Ragan	Ford	50.502	189.616
26	31	Jeff Burton	Chevrolet	50.519	189.552
27	42	Juan Pablo Montoya	Chevrolet	50.565	189.380
28	78	Regan Smith	Chevrolet	50.582	189.316
29	51	Kurt Busch	Chevrolet	50.660	189.025
30	30	David Stremme	Toyota	50.681	188.947
31	32	Terry Labonte	Ford	50.722	188.794
32	38	David Gilliland	Ford	50.740	188.727
33	26	Josh Wise	Ford	50.761	188.649
34	98	Michael McDowell	Ford	50.764	188.638
35	97	Timmy Hill	Toyota	50.848	188.326
36	93	Travis Kvapil	Toyota	50.856	188.296
37	87	Joe Nemechek	Toyota	50.936	188.001
38	83	Landon Cassill	Toyota	50.940	187.986
39	36	Dave Blaney	Chevrolet	51.083	187.460
40	47	Bobby Labonte	Toyota	51.211	186.991
41	10	David Reutimann	Chevrolet	51.268	186.783
42	33	Cole Whitt	Chevrolet	51.404	186.289
43	23	Robert Richardson Jr.	Toyota	51.500	185.942

=== Race ===
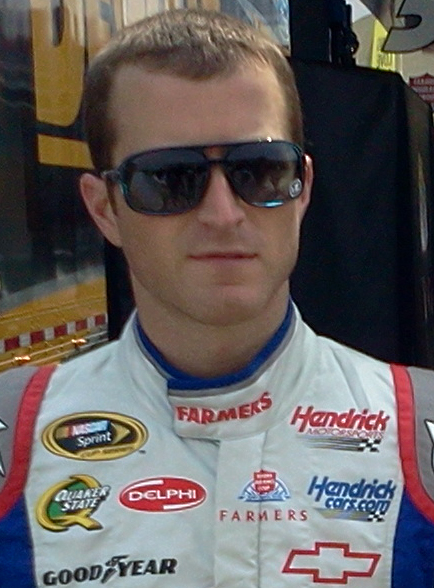
Kasey Kahne scored the pole position.

To begin pre-race ceremonies, Billy Irvin, a volunteer with Alabama Raceway Ministries and director of ministry relations with FAITH Radio in Montgomery, Alabama, delivered the invocation. Then, singer Raelynn performed the National anthem. At 2:11 PM, actor Kevin James gave the command to start engines.

At the drop of the green flag, Kasey Kahne led, and continued to lead for the first ten laps. On lap 11, Trevor Bayne took the lead with drafting help from Clint Bowyer. Three laps later, Dale Earnhardt Jr. claimed the lead. Earnhardt Jr. led for two laps before being passed by Kyle Busch.

On lap 17, the first caution came out for a three car crash in turn 4 that eliminated Carl Edwards and Cole Whitt from contention, and also gave some heavy damage to Joey Logano. Both Edwards and Logano decided to continue racing, while Whitt retired from the event. Kyle Busch continued to lead the field when the green flag waved on lap 22. Two laps later, Matt Kenseth passed Busch to lead. Kenseth led for ten laps, before Earnhardt Jr. passed him. On lap 35, Denny Hamlin reported a loose rearview mirror in his car. Earnhardt Jr. led for seven laps before being repassed by Kenseth on lap 41. One lap later, Kenseth got loose off of Greg Biffle's bumper, and he went from 1st to 31st place in a matter of seconds, while Earnhardt Jr. received the lead. On lap 50, Casey Mears received the lead. A lap later, Mears was passed by Jeff Burton, who led for two laps before Bayne received the lead.

By lap 58, Mears had re-received the lead. From lap 60 to lap 62, the field was cycled through green-flag pit stops. Earnhardt Jr, Bayne, Kyle Busch, and others received speeding penalties. These penalties ultimately resulted in Earnhardt Jr. and Busch being trapped a lap down for a significant chunk of the mid-portion of the race. On lap 64, Jimmie Johnson took the lead. On lap 73, Jeff Gordon passed Johnson with drafting help from Kenseth. By lap 83, Jamie McMurray had taken the lead.

On lap 90, Kurt Busch, in his last start for Phoenix Racing, received the lead. One lap later, the leading pack lapped a group of cars that were made up of Michael McDowell, Landon Cassill, Dave Blaney and Carl Edwards, the first three being in the lead lap before this. McDowell decided to take the high lane while the other three stayed in the inside lane, forcing the lead pack to weave through the middle of slower traffic. Five laps later, Kenseth took the lead. He led for two laps before Busch repassed him. Two laps after that, the second caution of the race waved when Kasey Kahne ran out of fuel, and simultaneously, Busch was spun out on the back straightaway by Jamie McMurray. Although the car took damage from hitting the inside wall, Busch was able to refire the engine, after the emergency crews had already reached him. A medical bag that was sitting on top of the car was subsequently thrown from the back decklid. NASCAR parked Busch for pulling away and trying to drive back to the garage despite the fact that his car was shedding debris.

On the restart at lap 104, Marcos Ambrose was the leader, but was passed during the next lap by Kenseth. On lap 121, Kyle Busch got onto the tail end of the lead lap, being pushed by Mears. On lap 127, Greg Biffle assumed the lead for one lap before being repassed by Kenseth. Four laps after that, Biffle pushed McMurray into the lead. Busch was shuffled back during this green flag run.

On lap 139, the third caution flag of the race was waved for debris. Earnhardt Jr., who had been leading the pack when caution came out, managed to get back on the lead lap along with Kyle Busch, who got a free pass. At the restart on lap 143, Casey Mears was leading again. Laps later, Biffle passed him. On lap 151, McMurray received the lead. A lap later, Biffle repassed him. On lap 155, Kevin Harvick gave McMurray a shove to reclaim the lead for two laps. On lap 168, Harvick became the leader. He led for three laps before Mears assumed the lead. On lap 173, the lead returned to McMurray. On lap 182, Kenseth claimed the lead, and the fourth caution came out as McMurray spun out in the tri-oval off of Harvick's bumper. Under the caution, 11 drivers did not pit, Dave Blaney (who was one lap down since lap 91) was given the free pass to move to the lead lap, and Clint Bowyer led the field at the restart on lap 187.

=== Final lap and repercussions ===
During the Green-White-Checkered attempt, Ryan Newman tried to squeeze it four-wide in between Casey Mears and Jimmie Johnson in the middle of the pack in turn 2 and was able to not cause a wreck. Down the backstretch, Kenseth tried to block Clint Bowyer for the lead but Kenseth touched Bowyer in the right front forcing him below the yellow line. Coming to the white flag, Tony Stewart claimed the lead in the trioval. Before the White Flag was waived, the pack behind Stewart and Kenseth had all bunched up to four-wide going four-rows back. Kenseth attempted to make a charge on the outside down the back straightaway. Entering turn three, Kenseth was leading the high lane and much of the field was bunched up behind him and Stewart. In turn four, Casey Mears started pushing Michael Waltrip and the pair made a move on the inside of Stewart. As Stewart tried to block, he was turned sideways by Waltrip's car and spun into the pack. Both Waltrip and Mears turned right to avoid Stewart, however the latter touched the former's right-rear corner and the pair smashed into the pack, with Waltrip just clipping Kevin Harvick's car and then hitting the outside wall, collecting 25 cars in all. Stewart's car went airborne and was upside down on top of several cars, including Kasey Kahne, Clint Bowyer, and Paul Menard. Overall, the wreck collected Dale Earnhardt Jr., Kevin Harvick, Denny Hamlin, Bobby Labonte, Terry Labonte, Jimmie Johnson, Kasey Kahne, Aric Almirola, Dave Blaney, Regan Smith, Michael Waltrip, Casey Mears, Brad Keselowski, Clint Bowyer, David Ragan, Paul Menard, Marcos Ambrose, Martin Truex Jr., David Gilliland, Kyle Busch, Sam Hornish Jr., Jeff Burton, Greg Biffle, Travis Kvapil, and Tony Stewart. Kenseth was the only one in front of the crash and he made it to the finish line to win the race followed by Jeff Gordon and Kyle Busch, who got through by going down to the apron. Greg Biffle and Ryan Newman, who were on the outside back of the four-wide pack before the crash, managed to avoid it by slowing down and weaving through out-of-control cars to finish in sixth and ninth place respectively. Only 17 of the 25 cars that were involved in the wreck were able to finish the race.

Dale Earnhardt Jr. contacted a neurosurgeon following headaches from the crash two days later, and a day later, the neurosurgeon medically disqualified Earnhardt following a concussion from being part of this crash. The next day, Earnhardt admitted in a press conference he had been concussed in an August 29 tire test at Kansas after a tire failure at speeds exceeding 300 km/h in Turn 1, and hired Regan Smith in the #88 until he was cleared. This eventually led to an official concussion protocol by NASCAR that would be in full effect by the 2014 season, including a new Chase format that would fit with the protocol to allow drivers to sit out races during the regular season.

Earnhardt's decision to sit out two races, and in 2016 sitting out half the season because of concussion-related symptoms, led to a more serious discussion regarding concussions in motorsport. In September 2026, the Darrell Waltrip family announced he was suffering from degenerative brain symptoms related to concussions during his NASCAR career (most notably the 1983 Daytona 500 where he was severely concussed but did not sit out races) were most likely CTE-related, and weeks later Chris Lorenzen and his sister Amanda Lorenzen Gardstrom, the children of NASCAR Hall of Fame inductee Fred Lorenzen, who died in December 2024, released a statement that following Boston University research, their father was diagnosed with Stage 3 CTE. The Lorenzen family started the Fred Lorenzen Help Line, inside the Concussion and CTE Institute, for motorsport-related concussions and head injuries.

== Results ==
=== Race results ===
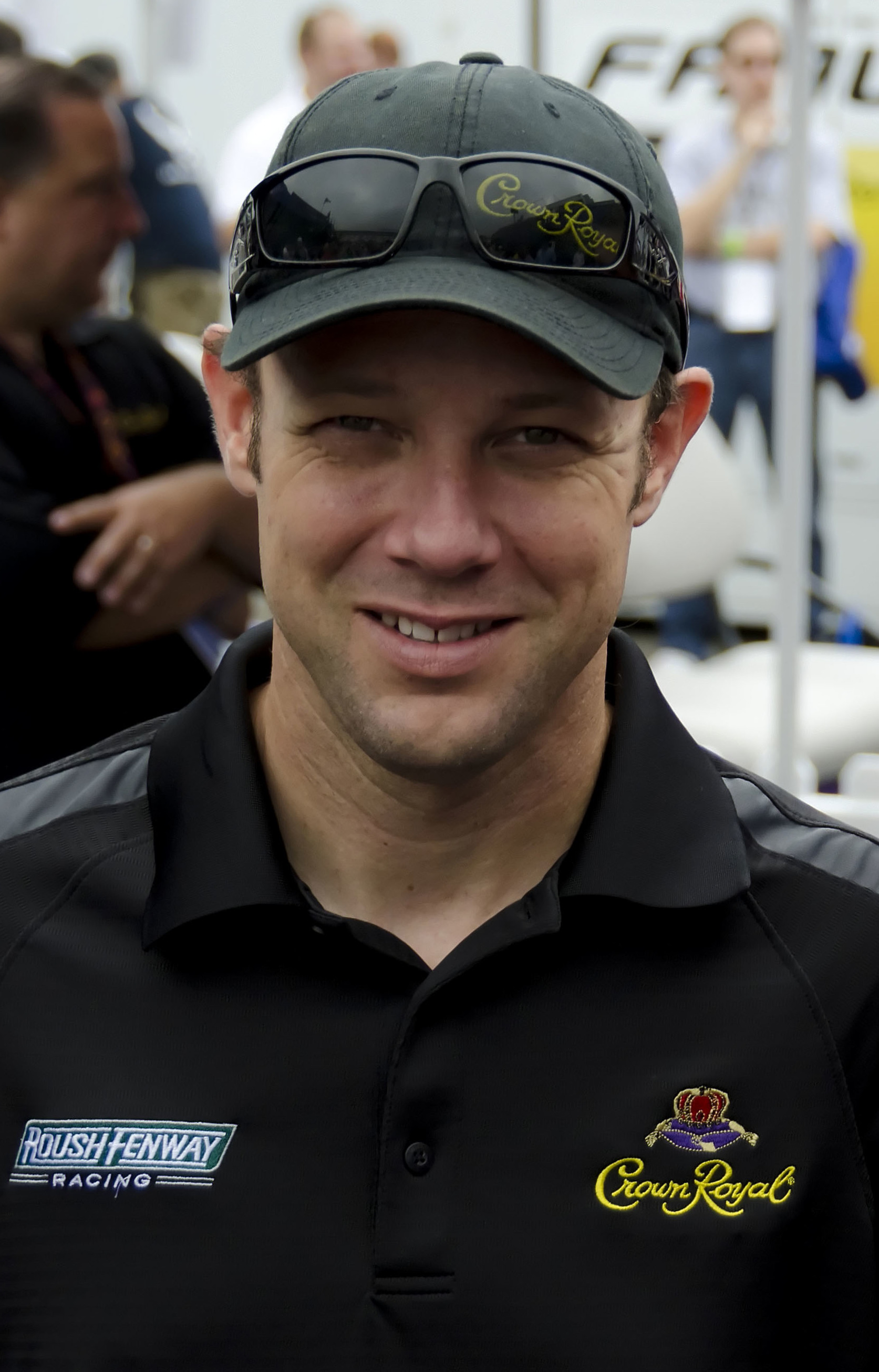
Matt Kenseth won the race.

Note: Cars that finished the final lap, despite being involved in the crash, are scored as having completed all 189 laps.

Pos	Car	Driver	Team	Manufacturer	Laps Run	Points
1	17	Matt Kenseth	Roush-Fenway Racing	Ford	189	47
2	24	Jeff Gordon	Hendrick Motorsports	Chevrolet	189	43
3	18	Kyle Busch	Joe Gibbs Racing	Toyota	189	42
4	34	David Ragan	Front Row Motorsports	Ford	189	41
5	78	Regan Smith	Furniture Row Racing	Chevrolet	189	39
6	16	Greg Biffle	Roush-Fenway Racing	Ford	189	39
7	2	Brad Keselowski	Penske Racing	Dodge	189	37
8	93	Travis Kvapil	BK Racing	Toyota	189	37
9	39	Ryan Newman	Stewart–Haas Racing	Chevrolet	189	35
10	31	Jeff Burton	Richard Childress Racing	Chevrolet	189	35
11	29	Kevin Harvick	Richard Childress Racing	Chevrolet	189	34
12	5	Kasey Kahne	Hendrick Motorsports	Chevrolet	189	33
13	56	Martin Truex Jr.	Michael Waltrip Racing	Toyota	189	31
14	11	Denny Hamlin	Joe Gibbs Racing	Toyota	189	30
15	38	David Gilliland	Front Row Motorsports	Ford	189	29
16	32	Terry Labonte	FAS Lane Racing	Ford	189	28
17	48	Jimmie Johnson	Hendrick Motorsports	Chevrolet	189	28
18	47	Bobby Labonte	JTG Daugherty Racing	Toyota	189	26
19	43	Aric Almirola	Richard Petty Motorsports	Ford	189	25
20	88	Dale Earnhardt Jr.	Hendrick Motorsports	Chevrolet	189	25
21	21	Trevor Bayne	Wood Brothers Racing	Ford	189	0
22	14	Tony Stewart	Stewart–Haas Racing	Chevrolet	188	23
23	15	Clint Bowyer	Michael Waltrip Racing	Toyota	188	22
24	22	Sam Hornish Jr.	Penske Racing	Dodge	188	0
25	55	Michael Waltrip	Michael Waltrip Racing	Toyota	188	19
26	13	Casey Mears	Germain Racing	Ford	188	19
27	9	Marcos Ambrose	Richard Petty Motorsports	Ford	188	18
28	27	Paul Menard	Richard Childress Racing	Chevrolet	188	16
29	36	Dave Blaney	Tommy Baldwin Racing	Chevrolet	188	15
30	83	Landon Cassill	BK Racing	Toyota	188	14
31	98	Michael McDowell	Phil Parsons Racing	Ford	188	13
32	20	Joey Logano	Joe Gibbs Racing	Toyota	187	12
33	30	David Stremme	Inception Motorsports	Toyota	187	11
34	1	Jamie McMurray	Earnhardt Ganassi Racing	Chevrolet	184	12
35	23	Robert Richardson Jr.	R3 Motorsports	Toyota	180	0
36	99	Carl Edwards	Roush Fenway Racing	Ford	179	8
37	10	David Reutimann	Tommy Baldwin Racing	Chevrolet	162	7
38	42	Juan Pablo Montoya	Earnhardt Ganassi Racing	Chevrolet	156	6
39	51	Kurt Busch	Phoenix Racing	Chevrolet	98	6
40	33	Cole Whitt	Circle Sport Racing	Chevrolet	16	0
41	87	Joe Nemechek	NEMCO Motorsports	Toyota	12	0
42	97	Timmy Hill	NEMCO Motorsports	Toyota	8	0
43	26	Josh Wise	Front Row Motorsports	Ford	5	1

The lead changed 54 times, the 39th time a race at Talladega had broken 40 official lead changes.

== Standings after the race ==
Drivers' Championship standings

	Pos	Driver	Points
	1	Brad Keselowski	2,179
	2	Jimmie Johnson	2,165 (–14)
	3	Denny Hamlin	2,156 (–23)
2	4	Kasey Kahne	2,143 (–36)
1	5	Clint Bowyer	2,139 (–40)

Manufacturers' Championship standings

Pos	Manufacturer	Points
1	Chevrolet	203
2	Toyota	176
3	Ford	147
4	Dodge	134

- Note: Only the first twelve positions are included for the driver standings.

Previous race: 2012 AAA 400	Sprint Cup Series; 2012 season	Next race: 2012 Bank of America 500
