= 2011 Aaron's 499 =

NASCAR race at Talladega in 2011

Race details
- Race 8 of 36 in the 2011 NASCAR Sprint Cup Series
- Date: April 17, 2011
- Official name: Aaron's 499
- Location: Talladega Superspeedway, Talladega, Alabama
- Course: Permanent racing facility
- Course length: 2.66 miles (4.28 km)
- Distance: 188 laps, 500.08 mi (804.8 km)
- Weather: Temperatures reaching up to 75 °F (24 °C); wind speeds up to 7 miles per hour (11 km/h)

Pole position
Driver	Jeff Gordon	Hendrick Motorsports
- Time: 53.723

Most laps led
Driver	Clint Bowyer	Richard Childress Racing
- Laps: 38

Winner
No. 48	Jimmie Johnson	Hendrick Motorsports

Television in the United States
- Network: Fox Broadcasting Company
- Announcers: Mike Joy, Darrell Waltrip and Larry McReynolds

The 2011 Aaron's 499 was the eighth race of the 2011 NASCAR Sprint Cup Series season out of thirty six total races. The race was held on April 17 at Talladega Superspeedway in Talladega, Alabama. Jeff Gordon won his 70th pole position, leading a Hendrick Motorsports sweep of the top four starting positions (Gordon and Jimmie Johnson in row 1; Mark Martin and Dale Earnhardt Jr. in row 2). Nearly the entire race, in similar fashion to the 2011 Daytona 500, was marked by the prevalence of 2-car drafting. On the last lap, four 2-car drafting teams contended for the win (Jimmie Johnson and Dale Earnhardt Jr.; Jeff Gordon and Mark Martin; Clint Bowyer and Kevin Harvick; Carl Edwards and Greg Biffle), and all eight cars finished within about three car-lengths of each other. Johnson, pushed by Earnhardt, won the race by .002 seconds over Clint Bowyer, the 2010 fall race winner at the track.

The finish is tied for the second closest in the Sprint Cup since NASCAR adopted electronic timing in 1993 tying the record of the 2003 Carolina Dodge Dealers 400 at Darlington Raceway.

== Report ==
=== Background ===
Talladega Superspeedway, the race track where the race was held.

Talladega Superspeedway is one of six superspeedways to hold NASCAR races; the others are Daytona International Speedway, Auto Club Speedway, Indianapolis Motor Speedway, Pocono Raceway and Michigan International Speedway. The standard track at the speedway is a four-turn superspeedway that is 2.66 miles (4.28 km) long. The track's turns are banked at thirty-three degrees, while the front stretch, the location of the finish line, is banked at 16.5 degrees. The back stretch has a two-degree banking. Talladega Superspeedway can seat up to 143,231 people.

Before the race, Carl Edwards led the Drivers' Championship at 256 points, and Kyle Busch stood in second with 247 points. Matt Kenseth was third in the rankings with 243 points, tied with Jimmie Johnson in fourth, three points ahead of Kurt Busch.

=== Race summary ===
The race, the eighth in the season, started at 1:08 p.m EDT, and was televised live in the United States on Fox. Temperatures were expected to brisk, but sunny. The green flag waved at 1:22 p.m.

To start the race, the front row drivers, Jimmie Johnson and Jeff Gordon, picked up their respective teammates, Dale Earnhardt Jr. and Mark Martin, as drafting partners. Gordon, with help from Martin, claimed the lead, leading the first few laps. On lap 3, the hooked-up pair of Clint Bowyer and Michael Waltrip began to challenge the two Hendrick pairs for the lead. On lap 10, Denny Hamlin pushed Ryan Newman through the field for the lead, but was passed a lap later by Brad Keselowski. Another lap later, Bowyer and Waltrip passed Keselowski for the lead. On lap 13, Kurt Busch claimed the lead with help from Landon Cassill, but was passed a lap later by Johnson and Earnhardt Jr., who had momentarily fallen back to 15th and 16th places a few laps earlier. They were, in turn, repassed by Bowyer one lap later.

On lap 19, Kasey Kahne, who had started in 31st place, claimed the lead with help from Brian Vickers, marking the eighth lead change of the day. David Ragan briefly took the lead on lap 22, hooked up with Paul Menard, but was soon passed by Kurt Busch and Landon Cassill on the next lap. One lap later, coming off turn three, they were passed by Kyle Busch and Joey Logano. Busch managed to maintain a lead over Bowyer for several laps. On lap 28, the first caution of the day waved as Cassill turned down and accidentally knocked Brian Vickers out of control in the back straightaway. Earnhardt Jr. also got some damage as he brushed with Jimmie Johnson while dodging Vickers' car, which had come to a rest in the middle of the track. Most of the drivers pitted under this caution. Cassill was penalized for pitting too early, and had to be moved to the back of the field. Carl Edwards briefly maintained the lead under the caution flag before he pitted.

On the lap 31 restart, Bowyer and Waltrip led the field. Bowyer then abandoned Waltrip and hooked up with his teammate Jeff Burton. On lap 34, Matt Kenseth briefly was in the lead, but Bowyer regained it before the field returned to the finish line. On lap 35, Kyle Busch and Logano pushed to the front on the inside line, but were passed by Kurt Busch when they were changing positions. A lap later, Bowyer used the advantage of Kurt Busch and Brad Keselowski switching places to take the lead. On lap 38, David Ragan pushed Kenseth back to the lead. Kenseth led for three laps before being passed by Joey Logano and Kyle Busch on lap 42. Two laps later, Paul Menard pushed Regan Smith into the lead. Within one lap, they had switched positions and Menard was in front. On lap 46, Bowyer pushed Jeff Burton to the front, where he led until being temporarily passed by Kurt Busch and Keselowski. Burton and Bowyer maintained a lead until lap 50, when Kenseth passed them.

On lap 52, Keselowski claimed the lead from Kenseth. One lap later, Johnson pushed Earnhardt Jr. into 1st place, duelling with Kenseth for the lead. On lap 56, Earnhardt Jr. and Johnson had a big lead, but were passed one lap later by the pair Greg Biffle and Trevor Bayne. Kenseth and Ragan moved to the outside lane on lap 58. On lap 59, Bayne switched positions with Biffle to lead a lap, before being passed by Earnhardt Jr. and Johnson on lap 60. Bowyer claimed the lead from Earnhardt on lap 62, but Earnhardt repassed him one lap later. One lap later, Bayne reclaimed the lead for three laps before Earnhardt Jr. repassed him as well.

The field cycled through green flag pit stops from lap 69 to lap 75, beginning with Carl Edwards and Marcos Ambrose on lap 69, and ending with Bowyer and Burton on lap 75. Earnhardt Jr. and Johnson briefly lost the lead for one lap to Trevor Bayne when they pitted, but when Bowyer and Burton pitted a few laps later, Johnson was leading, pushed by Earnhardt Jr.. These two drivers led for several more laps, until lap 83, when Ryan Newman claimed the lead with help from Kyle Busch. He was repassed by Johnson a lap later. Newman eventually maintained a solid first-place position on lap 89.

One lap later, the second caution flag waved for a wreck on turn 3. This was the largest crash of the race, as the Big One did not happen. It started when Kurt Busch turned Keselowski into the wall, causing a chain reaction that collected Kasey Kahne, Ambrose, Ragan, and Bayne. Kahne's car coasted down the apron on fire, and replays showed that Ragan's engine blew up heading into the wreck. During this caution, most of the field pitted, and Kurt Busch, pushed by his brother, led at the restart on lap 96. The Busch brothers were passed a lap later by Bowyer and Burton, but Kurt Busch took the lead again on lap 98 and held it until lap 100 when he was passed by Dave Blaney. Within a lap, Edwards claimed the lead. He maintained the lead until lap 104 when Kurt Busch repassed him. He held that lead until Clint Bowyer passed Regan Smith and Kurt Busch on lap 109.

Both Busch brothers shot back to the front on lap 111, leading for several more laps until Bowyer once again took the lead on lap 116. On lap 112, Terry Labonte and J. J. Yeley pitted. Menard pushed Smith to the lead on lap 117. Smith maintained this lead for one lap before being repassed by Bowyer, who led for one lap before being passed by Blaney, receiving a shove from Kevin Harvick, on lap 119. On lap 121, Labonte received a penalty for speeding on pit road. Kurt Busch regained the lead on lap 122 as Blaney and Harvick switched positions. On lap 128, the third caution flag waved for debris that appeared to have come off of Bowyer's car. Another round of pit stops began under the caution. The 61st lead change happened on lap 130 when Casey Mears momentarily assumed the lead before pitting, giving the lead back to Menard, who led at the lap 132 restart. Smith claimed the lead on lap 133 by pulling in front of and hooking up with Menard. On lap 134, Burton and Bowyer reclaimed the lead, with Burton in front, but were repassed by Dave Blaney one lap later. Burton reclaimed the lead on lap 139.

On lap 140, the fourth caution flag waved for a wreck on the backstretch. It started when Kyle Busch got loose from Logano, causing Busch to veer left into Kenseth, collecting him, and causing A. J. Allmendinger to spin out. Most cars pitted on lap 141, causing Bobby Labonte to lead for a pace lap, before he pitted and Harvick assumed the lead on lap 143. At the lap 144 restart, the four Richard Childress Racing cars - Harvick, Burton, Menard, and Bowyer were in front. Harvick was passed on lap 147 by Martin Truex Jr., whom he repassed a lap later. Truex Jr. reclaimed the lead on lap 150. By lap 152, Jeff Burton had claimed the lead from Harvick. On lap 154, Jamie McMurray claimed the lead with help from his teammate Juan Pablo Montoya, but one lap later, Blaney edged McMurray for the lead. On lap 158, Bowyer passed Blaney for the lead with help from Harvick.

On lap 163, the fifth caution flag was waved for debris on the track. Bowyer maintained his lead as other drivers pitted, and continued to lead at the restart on lap 167. Harvick fell back on the restart as a result of miscommunications with Burton and Bowyer. On lap 169, Menard gave Smith another push to the lead, but was repassed by Bowyer a lap later. On lap 171, Ryan Newman nearly lost control of his car and bumped into Montoya, inflicting minor damage to Montoya's car, but the green flag stayed out. Three laps later, the sixth caution flag was waved when Newman spun out on the back straightaway. By lap 176, Jeff Gordon moved up to third, with Mark Martin restarting behind him on lap 177, with Blaney in the lead. On lap 178, Harvick and Bowyer passed Gordon and Martin to claim the lead. Kurt Busch pushed Blaney back to the lead on lap 180.

On lap 184, Edwards claimed the lead with help from Greg Biffle. On lap 185, Blaney spun out off of Kurt Busch's bumper, falling out of line, and Bowyer claimed the lead. Edwards and Biffle passed Bowyer and Harvick a lap later. Gordon overtook Edwards to claim the lead at the white flag. Heading down the back straightaway, Gordon and Martin were on the inside lane, and were soon overtaken by Bowyer and Harvick. Johnson and Earnhardt Jr. began to move up and were a car length behind the two lead pairs exiting turn 4. They squeezed to the far inside lane between Martin and Gordon and the double yellow out-of-bounds line. Going through the tri-oval, Bowyer on the high side was a car length ahead of Gordon. Earnhardt Jr. and Martin rubbed fenders, and Gordon briefly lost momentum. Johnson accelerated, and Bowyer lost speed as he hit a pocket of air, and Johnson inched ahead to beat Bowyer to the finish line by 0.002 seconds, the closest ever recorded finish at a restrictor plate race. At the finish line, the first eight cars were four wide, as Edwards and Biffle were running on the far outside, squeezed between the wall and Bowyer.

All four of the Hendrick cars had Top 10 finishes: Gordon finished third, Earnhardt Jr. finished fourth, and Martin finished eighth.

== Results ==
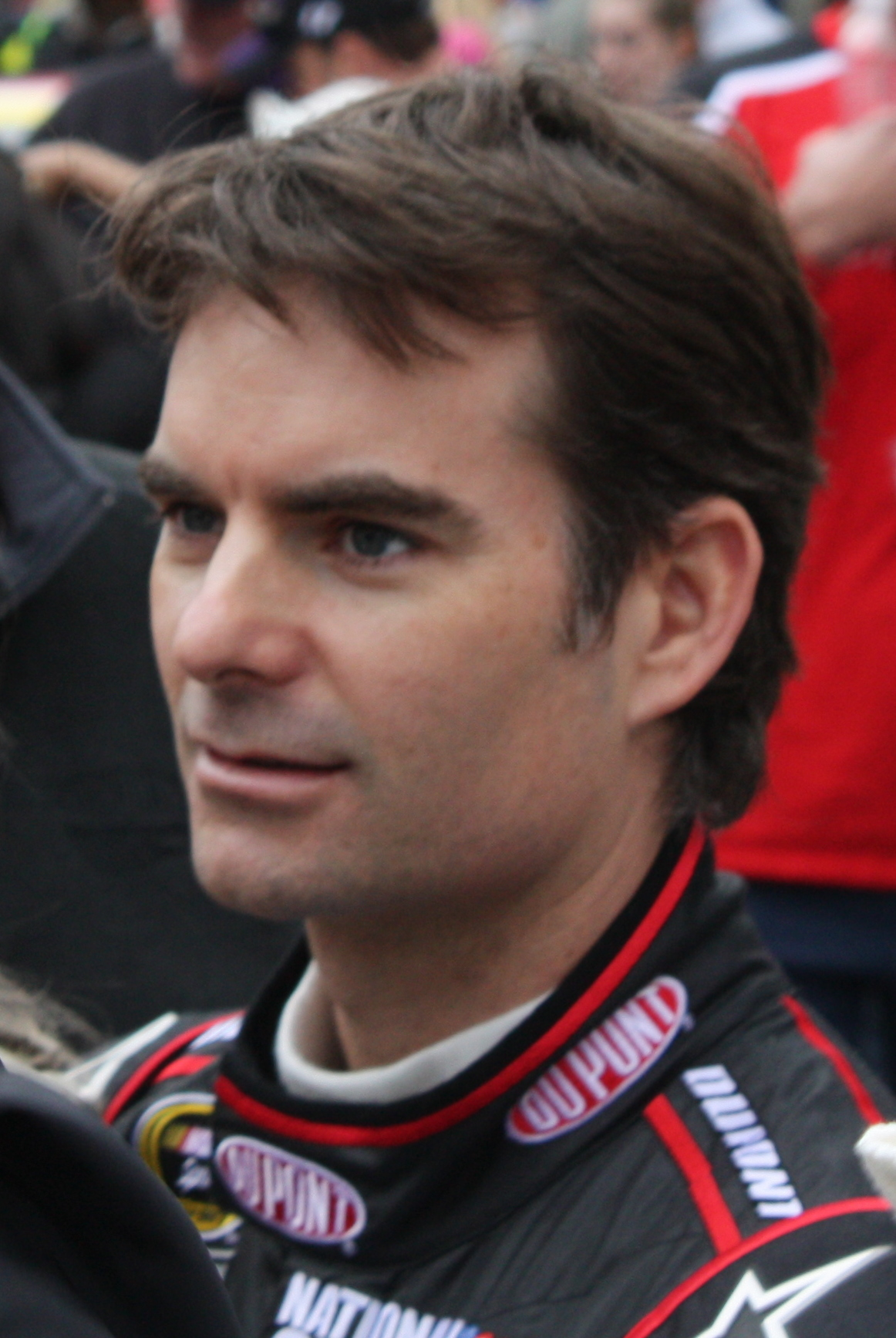
Jeff Gordon scored the 70th pole position of his career.

=== Qualifying ===
Qualifying results
Grid	Car	Driver	Team	Manufacturer	Time	Speed
1	24	Jeff Gordon	Hendrick Motorsports	Chevrolet	53.723	178.248
2	48	Jimmie Johnson	Hendrick Motorsports	Chevrolet	53.845	177.844
3	5	Mark Martin	Hendrick Motorsports	Chevrolet	53.856	177.807
4	88	Dale Earnhardt Jr.	Hendrick Motorsports	Chevrolet	53.869	177.765
5	27	Paul Menard	Richard Childress Racing	Chevrolet	53.888	177.702
6	09	Landon Cassill	Phoenix Racing	Chevrolet	53.893	177.685
7	6	David Ragan	Roush Fenway Racing	Ford	53.968	177.439
8	22	Kurt Busch	Penske Racing	Dodge	53.986	177.379
9	83	Brian Vickers	Red Bull Racing Team	Toyota	53.989	177.370
10	33	Clint Bowyer	Richard Childress Racing	Chevrolet	53.994	177.353
11	21	Trevor Bayne	Wood Brothers Racing	Ford	53.994	177.353
12	15	Michael Waltrip	Michael Waltrip Racing	Toyota	54.005	177.317
13	42	Juan Pablo Montoya	Earnhardt Ganassi Racing	Chevrolet	54.046	177.182
14	00	David Reutimann	Michael Waltrip Racing	Toyota	54.058	177.143
15	47	Bobby Labonte	JTG Daugherty Racing	Toyota	54.065	177.120
16	43	A. J. Allmendinger	Richard Petty Motorsports	Ford	54.075	177.087
17	16	Greg Biffle	Roush Fenway Racing	Ford	54.079	177.074
18	78	Regan Smith	Furniture Row Racing	Chevrolet	54.083	177.061
19	2	Brad Keselowski	Penske Racing	Dodge	54.092	177.032
20	99	Carl Edwards	Roush Fenway Racing	Ford	54.100	177.005
21	1	Jamie McMurray	Earnhardt Ganassi Racing	Chevrolet	54.141	176.872
22	87	Joe Nemechek	NEMCO Motorsports	Toyota	54.195	176.695
23	39	Ryan Newman	Stewart-Haas Racing	Chevrolet	54.206	176.659
24	9	Marcos Ambrose	Richard Petty Motorsports	Ford	54.232	176.575
25	17	Matt Kenseth	Roush Fenway Racing	Ford	54.249	176.519
26	56	Martin Truex Jr.	Michael Waltrip Racing	Toyota	54.262	176.477
27	31	Jeff Burton	Richard Childress Racing	Chevrolet	54.267	176.461
28	38	Travis Kvapil	Front Row Motorsports	Ford	54.278	176.425
29	11	Denny Hamlin	Joe Gibbs Racing	Toyota	54.295	176.370
30	14	Tony Stewart	Stewart-Haas Racing	Chevrolet	54.302	176.347
31	4	Kasey Kahne	Red Bull Racing Team	Toyota	54.317	176.298
32	97	Kevin Conway	NEMCO Motorsports	Toyota	54.349	176.195
33	35	Steve Park	Tommy Baldwin Racing	Chevrolet	54.359	176.162
34	18	Kyle Busch	Joe Gibbs Racing	Toyota	54.428	175.939
35	36	Dave Blaney	Tommy Baldwin Racing	Chevrolet	54.469	175.806
36	20	Joey Logano	Joe Gibbs Racing	Toyota	54.592	175.410
37	71	Andy Lally	TRG Motorsports	Chevrolet	54.611	175.349
38	29	Kevin Harvick	Richard Childress Racing	Chevrolet	54.672	175.154
39	34	David Gilliland	Front Row Motorsports	Ford	54.678	175.134
40	13	Casey Mears	Germain Racing	Toyota	54.847	174.595
41	32	Terry Labonte	FAS Lane Racing	Ford	54.949	174.271
42	7	Sam Hornish Jr.	Robby Gordon Motorsports	Dodge	–	–
43	46	Bill Elliott	Whitney Motorsports	Chevrolet	Champion's provisional	
Failed to qualify
44	60	Mike Skinner	Germain Racing	Toyota	54.692	175.090
45	37	Tony Raines	Max Q Motorsports	Ford	54.720	175.000
46	66	Michael McDowell	HP Racing	Toyota	54.770	174.840

=== Race results ===
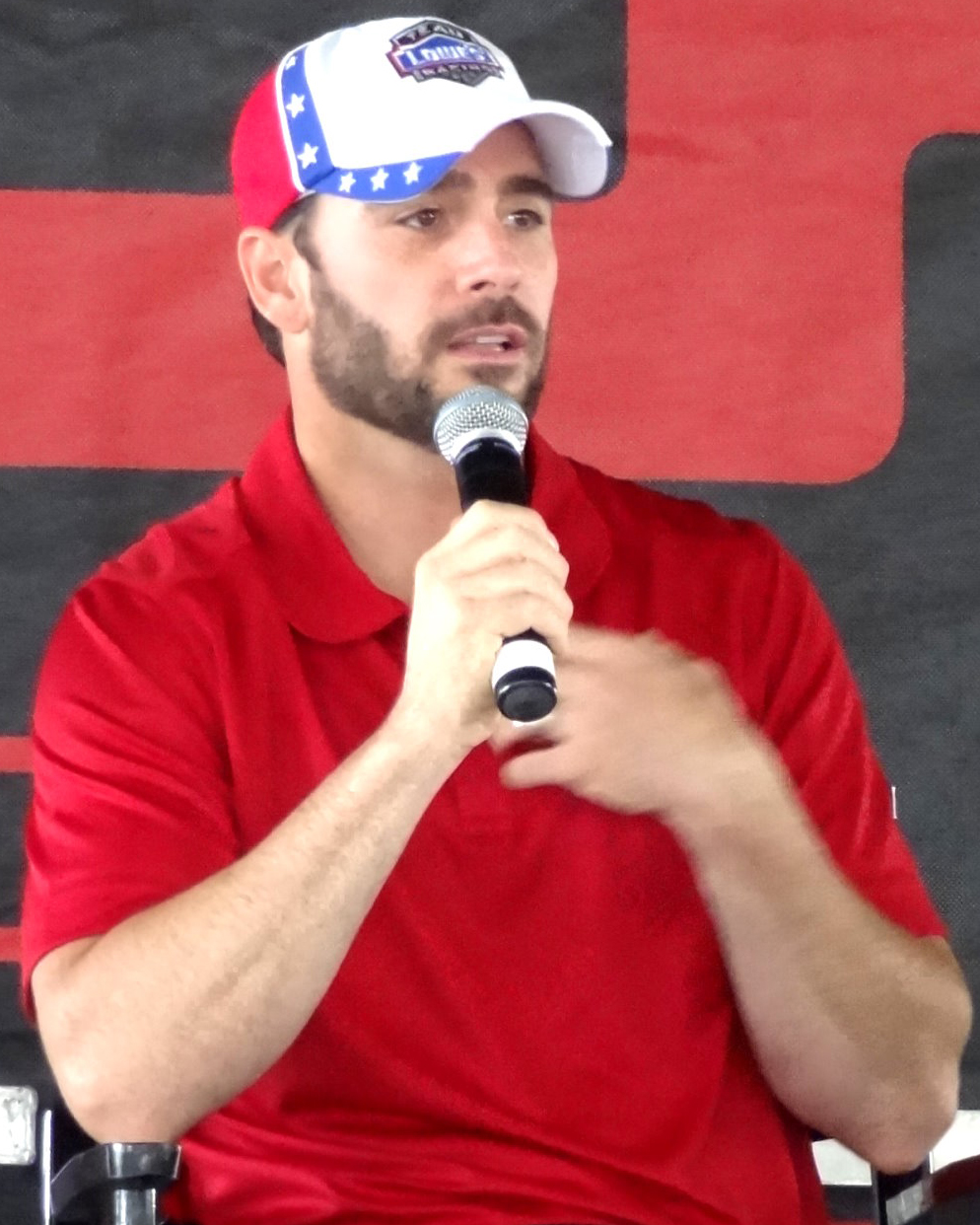
Jimmie Johnson won the race in a finish tied for the closest in the series' history.

Race results
Pos	Grid	Car	Driver	Team	Manufacturer	Laps	Points
1	2	48	Jimmie Johnson	Hendrick Motorsports	Chevrolet	188	47^{1}
2	10	33	Clint Bowyer	Richard Childress Racing	Chevrolet	188	44^{2}
3	1	24	Jeff Gordon	Hendrick Motorsports	Chevrolet	188	42^{1}
4	4	88	Dale Earnhardt Jr.	Hendrick Motorsports	Chevrolet	188	41^{1}
5	38	29	Kevin Harvick	Richard Childress Racing	Chevrolet	188	40^{1}
6	20	99	Carl Edwards	Roush Fenway Racing	Ford	188	39^{1}
7	17	16	Greg Biffle	Roush Fenway Racing	Ford	188	38^{1}
8	3	5	Mark Martin	Hendrick Motorsports	Chevrolet	188	37^{1}
9	39	34	David Gilliland	Front Row Motorsports	Ford	188	35
10	36	20	Joey Logano	Joe Gibbs Racing	Toyota	188	35^{1}
11	16	43	A. J. Allmendinger	Richard Petty Motorsports	Ford	188	33
12	5	27	Paul Menard	Richard Childress Racing	Chevrolet	188	33^{1}
13	26	56	Martin Truex Jr.	Michael Waltrip Racing	Toyota	188	32^{1}
14	14	00	David Reutimann	Michael Waltrip Racing	Toyota	188	30
15	18	78	Regan Smith	Furniture Row Racing	Chevrolet	188	30^{1}
16	27	31	Jeff Burton	Richard Childress Racing	Chevrolet	188	29^{1}
17	30	14	Tony Stewart	Stewart-Haas Racing	Chevrolet	188	27
18	8	22	Kurt Busch	Penske Racing	Dodge	188	27^{1}
19	37	71	Andy Lally	TRG Motorsports	Chevrolet	188	25
20	42	7	Robby Gordon	Robby Gordon Motorsports	Dodge	188	24
21	21	1	Jamie McMurray	Earnhardt Ganassi Racing	Chevrolet	188	24^{1}
22	40	13	Casey Mears	Germain Racing	Toyota	188	23^{1}
23	29	11	Denny Hamlin	Joe Gibbs Racing	Toyota	188	21
24	15	47	Bobby Labonte	JTG Daugherty Racing	Toyota	188	21^{1}
25	23	39	Ryan Newman	Stewart-Haas Racing	Chevrolet	188	20^{1}
26	43	46	Bill Elliott	Whitney Motorsports	Chevrolet	188	18
27	35	36	Dave Blaney	Tommy Baldwin Racing	Chevrolet	188	18^{1}
28	12	15	Michael Waltrip	Michael Waltrip Racing	Toyota	187	16
29	28	38	Travis Kvapil	Front Row Motorsports	Ford	184	0^{3}
30	13	42	Juan Pablo Montoya	Earnhardt Ganassi Racing	Chevrolet	177	14
31	6	09	Landon Cassill	Phoenix Racing	Chevrolet	170	0^{3}
32	24	9	Marcos Ambrose	Richard Petty Motorsports	Ford	157	13^{1}
33	19	2	Brad Keselowski	Penske Racing	Dodge	154	12^{1}
34	41	32	Terry Labonte	FAS Lane Racing	Ford	152	10
35	34	18	Kyle Busch	Joe Gibbs Racing	Toyota	144	10^{1}
36	25	17	Matt Kenseth	Roush Fenway Racing	Ford	139	9^{1}
37	31	4	Kasey Kahne	Red Bull Racing Team	Toyota	139	8^{1}
38	9	83	Brian Vickers	Red Bull Racing Team	Toyota	115	6
39	7	6	David Ragan	Roush Fenway Racing	Ford	89	6^{1}
40	11	21	Trevor Bayne	Wood Brothers Racing	Ford	89	0^{3}
41	22	87	Joe Nemechek	NEMCO Motorsports	Toyota	5	0^{3}
42	33	35	Steve Park	Tommy Baldwin Racing	Chevrolet	4	2
43	32	97	Kevin Conway	NEMCO Motorsports	Toyota	1	0^{3}
^{1} Includes one bonus point for leading a lap
^{2} Includes two bonus points for leading the most laps
^{3} Ineligible for championship points

Previous race: 2011 Samsung Mobile 500	Sprint Cup Series; 2011 season	Next race: 2011 Crown Royal Presents the Matthew and Daniel Hansen 400
