= 2011 Samsung Mobile 500 =

Race details
- Race 7 of 36 in the 2011 NASCAR Sprint Cup Series
- Simple line diagram of Texas Motor Speedway track layout
- Date: April 9, 2011
- Official name: Samsung Mobile 500
- Location: Texas Motor Speedway in Fort Worth, Texas
- Course: Permanent racing facility
- Course length: 2.4 km (1.5 miles)
- Distance: 334 laps, 501 mi (806.3 km)
- Weather: Temperatures reaching a low of 68 °F (20 °C); wind speeds up to 26 miles per hour (42 km/h)

Pole position
| Driver | David Ragan | Roush Fenway Racing |
- Time: 28.448

Most laps led
| Driver | Matt Kenseth | Roush Fenway Racing |
- Laps: 169

Winner
| No. 17 | Matt Kenseth | Roush Fenway Racing |

Television in the United States
- Network: Fox Broadcasting Company
- Announcers: Mike Joy, Darrell Waltrip and Larry McReynolds

The 2011 Samsung Mobile 500 NASCAR race was held on April 9, 2011, at Texas Motor Speedway in Fort Worth, Texas. It was the first spring night race for Texas Motor Speedway in its 15-year history of hosting NASCAR races and was the seventh race in the 2011 Sprint Cup season.

Matt Kenseth won the race for Roush Fenway Racing, ending a 76-race winless streak. There was only 1 major wreck, involving Martin Truex Jr., Mark Martin, and Regan Smith. David Starr made his Cup debut in the race.

== Results ==
=== Qualifying ===
Qualifying Results
| Grid | Car | Driver | Team | Manufacturer |
|---|---|---|---|---|
| 1 | 6 | David Ragan | Roush Fenway Racing | Ford |
| 2 | 99 | Carl Edwards | Roush Fenway Racing | Ford |
| 3 | 33 | Clint Bowyer | Richard Childress Racing | Chevrolet |
| 4 | 17 | Matt Kenseth | Roush Fenway Racing | Ford |
| 5 | 78 | Regan Smith | Furniture Row Racing | Chevrolet |
| 6 | 48 | Jimmie Johnson | Hendrick Motorsports | Chevrolet |
| 7 | 9 | Marcos Ambrose | Richard Petty Motorsports | Ford |
| 8 | 20 | Joey Logano | Joe Gibbs Racing | Toyota |
| 9 | 16 | Greg Biffle | Roush Fenway Racing | Ford |
| 10 | 22 | Kurt Busch | Penske Racing | Dodge |
| 11 | 18 | Kyle Busch | Joe Gibbs Racing | Toyota |
| 12 | 31 | Jeff Burton | Richard Childress Racing | Chevrolet |
| 13 | 4 | Kasey Kahne | Team Red Bull | Toyota |
| 14 | 42 | Juan Pablo Montoya | Earnhardt Ganassi Racing | Chevrolet |
| 15 | 43 | A. J. Allmendinger | Richard Petty Motorsports | Ford |
| 16 | 39 | Ryan Newman | Stewart–Haas Racing | Chevrolet |
| 17 | 1 | Jamie McMurray | Earnhardt Ganassi Racing | Chevrolet |
| 18 | 21 | Trevor Bayne | Wood Brothers Racing | Ford |
| 19 | 27 | Paul Menard | Richard Childress Racing | Chevrolet |
| 20 | 66 | Michael McDowell | HP Racing | Toyota |
| 21 | 5 | Mark Martin | Hendrick Motorsports | Chevrolet |
| 22 | 13 | Casey Mears | Germain Racing | Toyota |
| 23 | 11 | Denny Hamlin | Joe Gibbs Racing | Toyota |
| 24 | 09 | Landon Cassill | Phoenix Racing | Chevrolet |
| 25 | 00 | David Reutimann | Michael Waltrip Racing | Toyota |
| 26 | 14 | Tony Stewart | Stewart–Haas Racing | Chevrolet |
| 27 | 2 | Brad Keselowski | Penske Racing | Dodge |
| 28 | 88 | Dale Earnhardt Jr. | Hendrick Motorsports | Chevrolet |
| 29 | 29 | Kevin Harvick | Richard Childress Racing | Chevrolet |
| 30 | 83 | Brian Vickers | Team Red Bull | Toyota |
| 31 | 56 | Martin Truex Jr. | Michael Waltrip Racing | Toyota |
| 32 | 24 | Jeff Gordon | Hendrick Motorsports | Chevrolet |
| 33 | 95 | David Starr | Leavine Fenton Racing | Ford |
| 34 | 47 | Bobby Labonte | JTG Daugherty Racing | Toyota |
| 35 | 46 | J. J. Yeley | Whitney Motorsports | Chevrolet |
| 36 | 60 | Mike Skinner | Germain Racing | Toyota |
| 37 | 87 | Joe Nemechek | NEMCO Motorsports | Toyota |
| 38 | 36 | Dave Blaney | Tommy Baldwin Racing | Chevrolet |
| 39 | 7 | Robby Gordon | Robby Gordon Motorsports | Dodge |
| 40 | 34 | David Gilliland | Front Row Motorsports | Ford |
| 41 | 32 | Ken Schrader | FAS Lane Racing | Ford |
| 42 | 37 | Tony Raines | Max Q Motorsports | Ford |
| 43 | 71 | Andy Lally | TRG Motorsports | Ford |

=== Race ===
Race Results
| Pos | Start | Car | Driver | Team | Manufacturer | Laps Run | Points |
|---|---|---|---|---|---|---|---|
| 1 | 4 | 17 | Matt Kenseth | Roush Fenway Racing | Ford | 334 | 48 |
| 2 | 3 | 33 | Clint Bowyer | Richard Childress Racing | Chevrolet | 334 | 43 |
| 3 | 2 | 99 | Carl Edwards | Roush Fenway Racing | Ford | 334 | 42 |
| 4 | 9 | 16 | Greg Biffle | Roush Fenway Racing | Ford | 334 | 41 |
| 5 | 19 | 27 | Paul Menard | Richard Childress Racing | Chevrolet | 334 | 39 |
| 6 | 7 | 9 | Marcos Ambrose | Richard Petty Motorsports | Ford | 334 | 39 |
| 7 | 1 | 6 | David Ragan | Roush Fenway Racing | Ford | 334 | 38 |
| 8 | 6 | 48 | Jimmie Johnson | Hendrick Motorsports | Chevrolet | 334 | 36 |
| 9 | 28 | 88 | Dale Earnhardt Jr. | Hendrick Motorsports | Chevrolet | 334 | 36 |
| 10 | 10 | 22 | Kurt Busch | Penske Racing | Dodge | 334 | 35 |
| 11 | 12 | 31 | Jeff Burton | Richard Childress Racing | Chevrolet | 334 | 33 |
| 12 | 26 | 14 | Tony Stewart | Stewart–Haas Racing | Chevrolet | 334 | 33 |
| 13 | 14 | 42 | Juan Pablo Montoya | Earnhardt Ganassi Racing | Chevrolet | 333 | 31 |
| 14 | 16 | 39 | Ryan Newman | Stewart–Haas Racing | Chevrolet | 333 | 30 |
| 15 | 23 | 11 | Denny Hamlin | Joe Gibbs Racing | Toyota | 333 | 29 |
| 16 | 11 | 18 | Kyle Busch | Joe Gibbs Racing | Toyota | 333 | 28 |
| 17 | 18 | 21 | Trevor Bayne | Wood Brothers Racing | Ford | 333 | 0 |
| 18 | 27 | 2 | Brad Keselowski | Penske Racing | Dodge | 333 | 27 |
| 19 | 15 | 43 | A. J. Allmendinger | Richard Petty Motorsports | Ford | 332 | 25 |
| 20 | 29 | 29 | Kevin Harvick | Richard Childress Racing | Chevrolet | 332 | 24 |
| 21 | 13 | 4 | Kasey Kahne | Team Red Bull | Toyota | 332 | 23 |
| 22 | 17 | 1 | Jamie McMurray | Earnhardt Ganassi Racing | Chevrolet | 332 | 22 |
| 23 | 32 | 24 | Jeff Gordon | Hendrick Motorsports | Chevrolet | 332 | 22 |
| 24 | 8 | 20 | Joey Logano | Joe Gibbs Racing | Toyota | 331 | 20 |
| 25 | 34 | 47 | Bobby Labonte | JTG Daugherty Racing | Toyota | 331 | 19 |
| 26 | 22 | 13 | Casey Mears | Germain Racing | Toyota | 331 | 18 |
| 27 | 30 | 83 | Brian Vickers | Team Red Bull | Toyota | 330 | 17 |
| 28 | 24 | 09 | Landon Cassill | Phoenix Racing | Chevrolet | 330 | 0 |
| 29 | 25 | 00 | David Reutimann | Michael Waltrip Racing | Toyota | 329 | 15 |
| 30 | 38 | 36 | Dave Blaney | Tommy Baldwin Racing | Chevrolet | 329 | 15 |
| 31 | 39 | 7 | Robby Gordon | Robby Gordon Motorsports | Dodge | 328 | 14 |
| 32 | 43 | 71 | Andy Lally | TRG Motorsports | Ford | 324 | 12 |
| 33 | 41 | 32 | Ken Schrader | FAS Lane Racing | Ford | 319 | 11 |
| 34 | 42 | 37 | Tony Raines | Max Q Motorsports | Ford | 319 | 10 |
| 35 | 31 | 56 | Martin Truex Jr. | Michael Waltrip Racing | Toyota | 213 | 9 |
| 36 | 21 | 5 | Mark Martin | Hendrick Motorsports | Chevrolet | 213 | 8 |
| 37 | 5 | 78 | Regan Smith | Furniture Row Racing | Chevrolet | 212 | 7 |
| 38 | 33 | 95 | David Starr | Leavine Fenton Racing | Ford | 122 | 0 |
| 39 | 37 | 87 | Joe Nemechek | NEMCO Motorsports | Toyota | 60 | 0 |
| 40 | 20 | 66 | Michael McDowell | HP Racing | Toyota | 56 | 4 |
| 41 | 35 | 46 | J. J. Yeley | Whitney Motorsports | Chevrolet | 52 | 3 |
| 42 | 40 | 34 | David Gilliland | Front Row Motorsports | Ford | 44 | 2 |
| 43 | 36 | 60 | Mike Skinner | Germain Racing | Toyota | 36 | 1 |

| Previous race: 2011 Goody's Fast Relief 500 | Sprint Cup Series; 2011 season | Next race: 2011 Aaron's 499 |
