= 2012 Goody's Fast Relief 500 =

Race details
- Race 6 of 36 in the 2012 NASCAR Sprint Cup Series
- The 2012 Goody's Fast Relief 500 program cover.
- Date: April 1, 2012
- Location: Martinsville Speedway, Ridgeway, Virginia
- Course: Permanent racing facility
- Course length: .526 miles (.847 km)
- Distance: 500 laps, 263 mi (423 km)
- Weather: Mostly sunny with a high temperature around 76; wind out of the NNW at 4 mph.
- Average speed: 78.823 miles per hour (126.853 km/h)

Pole position
Driver	Kasey Kahne	Hendrick Motorsports
- Time: 19.496

Most laps led
Driver	Jeff Gordon	Hendrick Motorsports
- Laps: 329

Winner
No. 39	Ryan Newman	Stewart–Haas Racing

Television in the United States
- Network: Fox
- Announcers: Mike Joy, Darrell Waltrip and Larry McReynolds

The race logo for the 2012 Goody's Fast Relief 500.

The 2012 Goody's Fast Relief 500 was a NASCAR Sprint Cup Series stock car race held on April 1, 2012 at Martinsville Speedway in Ridgeway, Virginia. Contested over 500 laps, it was the sixth race of the 2012 season. Ryan Newman of Stewart–Haas Racing took his first win of the season, A. J. Allmendinger finished second and Dale Earnhardt Jr. finished third.

== Report ==
=== Background ===
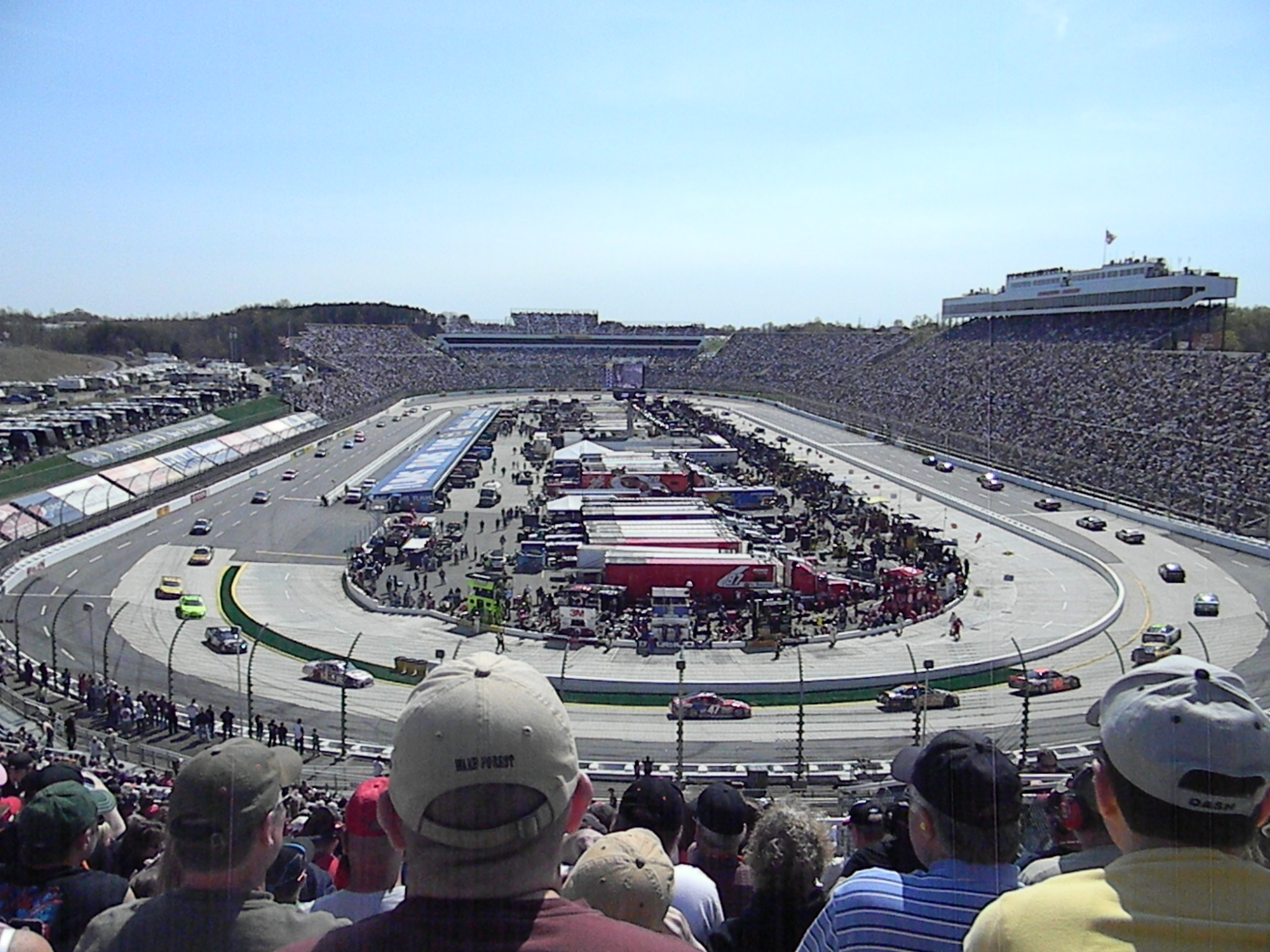
Martinsville Speedway, the race track where the race was held.

Martinsville Speedway is one of five short tracks to hold NASCAR races. The standard track at Martinsville Speedway is a four-turn short track oval that is 0.526 miles (0.847 km) long. The track's turns are banked at eleven degrees, while the front stretch, the location of the finish line, is banked at zero degrees. The back stretch also has a zero degree banking. The racetrack has seats for 63,000 spectators.

Before the race, Greg Biffle led the Drivers' Championship with 195 points, and Kevin Harvick stood in second with 188. Dale Earnhardt Jr. followed in third with 178 points, one ahead of Tony Stewart and three ahead of Martin Truex Jr. in fourth and fifth. Matt Kenseth, with 173, was two points ahead of Denny Hamlin in seventh. Clint Bowyer, with 157 points, was one point ahead of Jimmie Johnson and two ahead of Ryan Newman in ninth and tenth. In the Manufacturers' Championship, Chevrolet was leading with 33 points, four points ahead of Ford. Toyota, with 27 points, was six points ahead of Dodge in the battle for third. Harvick is the race's defending race winner after winning it in 2011.

No.	Driver	Team	Make
1	Jamie McMurray	Earnhardt Ganassi Racing	Chevrolet
2	Brad Keselowski	Penske Racing	Dodge
5	Kasey Kahne	Hendrick Motorsports	Chevrolet
9	Marcos Ambrose	Richard Petty Motorsports	Ford
10	David Reutimann	Tommy Baldwin Racing	Chevrolet
11	Denny Hamlin	Joe Gibbs Racing	Toyota
13	Casey Mears	Germain Racing	Ford
14	Tony Stewart	Stewart–Haas Racing	Chevrolet
15	Clint Bowyer	Michael Waltrip Racing	Toyota
16	Greg Biffle	Roush Fenway Racing	Ford
17	Matt Kenseth	Roush Fenway Racing	Ford
18	Kyle Busch	Joe Gibbs Racing	Toyota
19	Mike Bliss	Humphrey Smith Racing	Toyota
20	Joey Logano	Joe Gibbs Racing	Toyota
22	A. J. Allmendinger	Penske Racing	Dodge
23	Scott Riggs	R3 Motorsports	Chevrolet
24	Jeff Gordon	Hendrick Motorsports	Chevrolet
26	Josh Wise	Front Row Motorsports	Ford
27	Paul Menard	Richard Childress Racing	Chevrolet
29	Kevin Harvick	Richard Childress Racing	Chevrolet
30	David Stremme	Inception Motorsports	Toyota
31	Jeff Burton	Richard Childress Racing	Chevrolet
32	Ken Schrader	FAS Lane Racing	Ford
33	Hermie Sadler	Richard Childress Racing	Chevrolet
34	David Ragan	Front Row Motorsports	Ford
36	Dave Blaney	Tommy Baldwin Racing	Chevrolet
37	Tony Raines	Rick Ware Racing/Max Q Motorsports	Ford
38	David Gilliland	Front Row Motorsports	Ford
39	Ryan Newman	Stewart–Haas Racing	Chevrolet
42	Juan Pablo Montoya	Earnhardt Ganassi Racing	Chevrolet
43	Aric Almirola	Richard Petty Motorsports	Ford
47	Bobby Labonte	JTG Daugherty Racing	Toyota
48	Jimmie Johnson	Hendrick Motorsports	Chevrolet
49	J. J. Yeley	Robinson-Blakeney Racing	Toyota
51	Kurt Busch	Phoenix Racing	Chevrolet
52	Scott Speed	Hamilton Means Racing	Ford
55	Brian Vickers	Michael Waltrip Racing	Toyota
56	Martin Truex Jr.	Michael Waltrip Racing	Toyota
74	Reed Sorenson	Turn One Racing	Chevrolet
78	Regan Smith	Furniture Row Racing	Chevrolet
83	Landon Cassill	BK Racing	Toyota
87	Joe Nemechek	NEMCO Motorsports	Toyota
88	Dale Earnhardt Jr.	Hendrick Motorsports	Chevrolet
93	Travis Kvapil	BK Racing	Toyota
98	Michael McDowell	Phil Parsons Racing	Ford
99	Carl Edwards	Roush Fenway Racing	Ford

== Practice and qualifying ==
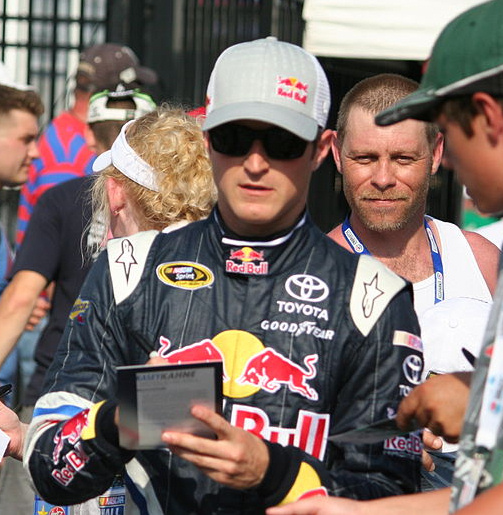
Kasey Kahne won the pole for race.

Two practice sessions were held before the race on Friday, both lasting 90 minutes each. Jeff Gordon was quickest with a time of 19.512 seconds in the first session, less than two-hundredths of a second faster than Kyle Busch. Hamlin was just off Burton's pace, followed by Dale Earnhardt Jr., Newman, and Martin Truex Jr. Stewart was seventh, still within two-tenths of a second of Gordon's time. In the second and final practice session, Gordon was quickest with a time of 19.516 seconds. Kurt Busch followed in the second position, ahead of Brad Keselowski, Newman, and David Stremme. Landon Cassill was sixth after posting a time of 19.844 seconds, while Josh Wise and Juan Pablo Montoya followed in seventh and eighth. Scott Riggs and Aric Almirola rounded out the first ten positions.

Forty-six cars are entered for qualifying, but only forty-three raced because of NASCAR's qualifying procedure.

== Results ==
=== Qualifying ===
Grid	No.	Driver	Team	Manufacturer	Time	Speed
1	5	Kasey Kahne	Hendrick Motorsports	Chevrolet	19.496	97.128
2	29	Kevin Harvick	Richard Childress Racing	Chevrolet	19.512	97.048
3	11	Denny Hamlin	Joe Gibbs Racing	Toyota	19.521	97.003
4	15	Clint Bowyer	Michael Waltrip Racing	Toyota	19.521	97.003
5	39	Ryan Newman	Stewart–Haas Racing	Chevrolet	19.524	96.988
6	55	Brian Vickers	Michael Waltrip Racing	Toyota	19.569	96.765
7	2	Brad Keselowski	Penske Racing	Dodge	19.572	96.750
8	18	Kyle Busch	Joe Gibbs Racing	Toyota	19.573	96.746
9	24	Jeff Gordon	Hendrick Motorsports	Chevrolet	19.576	96.731
10	20	Joey Logano	Joe Gibbs Racing	Toyota	19.581	96.706
11	27	Paul Menard	Richard Childress Racing	Chevrolet	19.582	96.701
12	9	Marcos Ambrose	Richard Petty Motorsports	Ford	19.597	96.627
13	56	Martin Truex Jr.	Michael Waltrip Racing	Toyota	19.606	96.583
14	88	Dale Earnhardt Jr.	Hendrick Motorsports	Chevrolet	19.637	96.430
15	14	Tony Stewart	Stewart–Haas Racing	Chevrolet	19.659	96.322
16	47	Bobby Labonte	JTG Daugherty Racing	Toyota	19.681	96.215
17	78	Regan Smith	Furniture Row Racing	Chevrolet	19.684	96.200
18	31	Jeff Burton	Richard Childress Racing	Chevrolet	19.688	96.180
19	43	Aric Almirola	Richard Petty Motorsports	Ford	19.715	96.049
20	1	Jamie McMurray	Earnhardt Ganassi Racing	Chevrolet	19.715	96.049
21	17	Matt Kenseth	Roush Fenway Racing	Ford	19.731	95.971
22	48	Jimmie Johnson	Hendrick Motorsports	Chevrolet	19.755	95.854
23	98	Michael McDowell	Phil Parsons Racing	Ford	19.756	95.849
24	34	David Ragan	Front Row Motorsports	Ford	19.760	95.830
25	13	Casey Mears	Germain Racing	Ford	19.767	95.796
26	16	Greg Biffle	Roush Fenway Racing	Ford	19.778	95.743
27	22	A. J. Allmendinger	Penske Racing	Dodge	19.779	95.738
28	99	Carl Edwards	Roush Fenway Racing	Ford	19.806	95.607
29	10	David Reutimann	Tommy Baldwin Racing	Chevrolet	19.806	95.607
30	26	Josh Wise	Front Row Motorsports	Ford	19.811	95.583
31	83	Landon Cassill	BK Racing	Toyota	19.826	95.511
32	42	Juan Pablo Montoya	Earnhardt Ganassi Racing	Chevrolet	19.833	95.477
33	23	Scott Riggs	R3 Motorsports	Chevrolet	19.859	95.352
34	93	Travis Kvapil	BK Racing	Toyota	19.860	95.347
35	74	Reed Sorenson	Turn One Racing	Chevrolet	19.886	95.223
36	32	Ken Schrader	FAS Lane Racing	Ford	19.906	95.127
37	87	Joe Nemechek	NEMCO Motorsports	Toyota	19.946	94.936
38	38	David Gilliland	Front Row Motorsports	Ford	19.979	94.780
39	30	David Stremme	Inception Motorsports	Toyota	20.015	94.609
40	51	Kurt Busch	Phoenix Racing	Chevrolet	20.024	94.567
41	33	Hermie Sadler	Richard Childress Racing	Chevrolet	20.041	94.486
42	36	Dave Blaney	Tommy Baldwin Racing	Chevrolet	20.322	93.180
43	49	J. J. Yeley	Robinson-Blakeney Racing	Toyota	20.315	93.212^{1}
Failed to Qualify
	52	Scott Speed	Hamilton Means Racing	Ford	20.560	92.101
	19	Mike Bliss	Humphrey-Smith Motorsports	Toyota	22.318	84.846
	37	Tony Raines	Rick Ware Racing/Max Q Motorsports	Ford	Time disallowed	

- ^1 Yeley was awarded the start after Raines failed post-qualifying inspection.

=== Race results ===
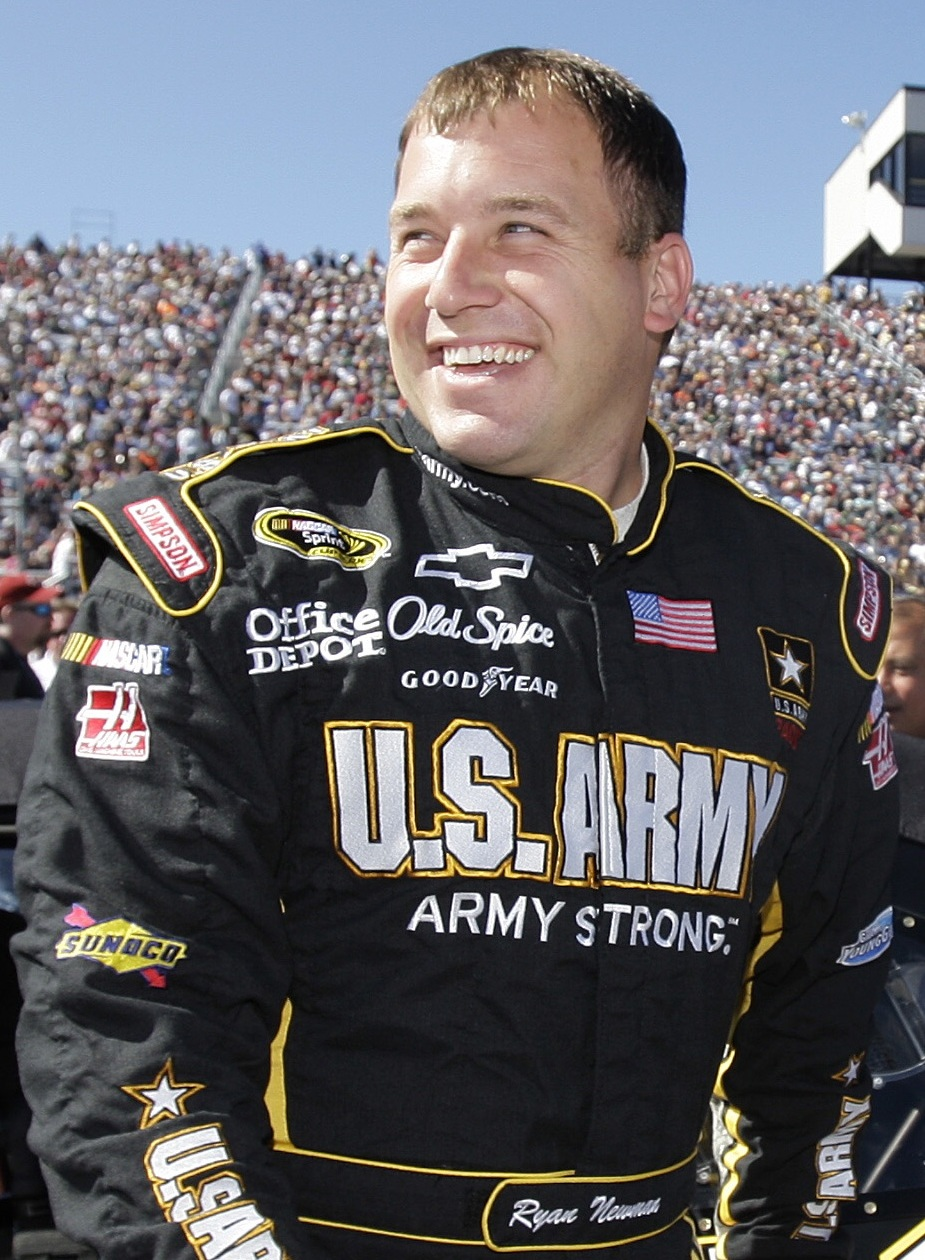
Ryan Newman won the race.

Pos	No.	Driver	Team	Manufacturer	Laps	Led	Points
1	39	Ryan Newman	Stewart–Haas Racing	Chevrolet	515	12	47
2	22	A. J. Allmendinger	Penske Racing	Dodge	515	0	42
3	88	Dale Earnhardt Jr.	Hendrick Motorsports	Chevrolet	515	3	42
4	17	Matt Kenseth	Roush Fenway Racing	Ford	515	1	41
5	56	Martin Truex Jr.	Michael Waltrip Racing	Toyota	515	0	39
6	11	Denny Hamlin	Joe Gibbs Racing	Toyota	515	31	39
7	14	Tony Stewart	Stewart–Haas Racing	Chevrolet	515	0	37
8	43	Aric Almirola	Richard Petty Motorsports	Ford	515	3	37
9	2	Brad Keselowski	Penske Racing	Dodge	515	2	36
10	15	Clint Bowyer	Michael Waltrip Racing	Toyota	515	2	35
11	99	Carl Edwards	Roush Fenway Racing	Ford	515	0	33
12	48	Jimmie Johnson	Hendrick Motorsports	Chevrolet	515	112	33
13	16	Greg Biffle	Roush Fenway Racing	Ford	514	0	31
14	24	Jeff Gordon	Hendrick Motorsports	Chevrolet	514	328	32
15	9	Marcos Ambrose	Richard Petty Motorsports	Ford	513	0	29
16	78	Regan Smith	Furniture Row Racing	Chevrolet	513	0	28
17	47	Bobby Labonte	JTG Daugherty Racing	Toyota	513	0	27
18	55	Brian Vickers	Michael Waltrip Racing	Toyota	513	0	26
19	29	Kevin Harvick	Richard Childress Racing	Chevrolet	513	21	26
20	1	Jamie McMurray	Earnhardt Ganassi Racing	Chevrolet	513	0	24
21	42	Juan Pablo Montoya	Earnhardt Ganassi Racing	Chevrolet	512	0	23
22	31	Jeff Burton	Richard Childress Racing	Chevrolet	512	0	22
23	20	Joey Logano	Joe Gibbs Racing	Toyota	511	0	21
24	34	David Ragan	Front Row Motorsports	Ford	511	0	20
25	13	Casey Mears	Germain Racing	Ford	511	0	19
26	27	Paul Menard	Richard Childress Racing	Chevrolet	510	0	18
27	93	Travis Kvapil	BK Racing	Toyota	510	0	17
28	38	David Gilliland	Front Row Motorsports	Ford	509	0	16
29	83	Landon Cassill	BK Racing	Toyota	507	0	15
30	30	David Stremme	Inception Motorsports	Toyota	506	0	14
31	33	Hermie Sadler	Richard Childress Racing	Chevrolet	505	0	13
32	32	Ken Schrader	FAS Lane Racing	Ford	503	0	12
33	51	Kurt Busch	Phoenix Racing	Chevrolet	497	0	11
34	36	Dave Blaney	Tommy Baldwin Racing	Chevrolet	439	0	10
35	10	David Reutimann	Tommy Baldwin Racing	Chevrolet	436	0	9
36	18	Kyle Busch	Joe Gibbs Racing	Toyota	435	0	8
37	49	J. J. Yeley	Robinson-Blakeney Racing	Toyota	359	0	7
38	5	Kasey Kahne	Hendrick Motorsports	Chevrolet	256	0	6
39	87	Joe Nemechek	NEMCO Motorsports	Toyota	74	0	–
40	98	Michael McDowell	Phil Parsons Racing	Ford	60	0	4
41	26	Josh Wise	Front Row Motorsports	Ford	49	0	3
42	23	Scott Riggs	R3 Motorsports	Chevrolet	30	0	2
43	74	Reed Sorenson	Turn One Racing	Chevrolet	25	0	–

== Standings after the race ==
Drivers' Championship standings

Pos	Driver	Wins	Points
1	Greg Biffle	0	226
2	Dale Earnhardt Jr.	0	220
3	Tony Stewart	2	214
4	Matt Kenseth	1	214
5	Kevin Harvick	0	214

Manufacturers' Championship standings

Pos	Manufacturer	Wins	Points
1	Chevrolet	3	42
2	Ford	1	33
3	Toyota	1	30
4	Dodge	1	27

- Note: Only the top five positions are included for the driver standings.

Previous race: 2012 Auto Club 400	Sprint Cup Series; 2012 season	Next race: 2012 Samsung Mobile 500
