= 2012 Bank of America 500 =

Race details
- Race 31 of 36 in the 2012 NASCAR Sprint Cup Series
- The 2012 Bank of America 500 program cover, featuring multiple drivers and the Teenage Mutant Ninja Turtles. Artwork by Sam Bass. "Speed, Danger, and Fun!"
- Date: October 13, 2012
- Location: Charlotte Motor Speedway, Concord, North Carolina, United States
- Course: Permanent racing facility
- Course length: 1.5 miles (2.4 km)
- Distance: 334 laps, 501 mi (806.281 km)
- Weather: Temperatures reaching as low as 44.1 °F (6.7 °C); wind speeds approaching 8.9 miles per hour (14.3 km/h)

Pole position
Driver	Greg Biffle	Roush Fenway Racing
- Time: 27.877

Most laps led
Driver	Brad Keselowski	Penske Racing
- Laps: 139

Winner
No. 15	Clint Bowyer	Michael Waltrip Racing

Television in the United States
- Network: ABC
- Announcers: Allen Bestwick, Dale Jarrett, and Andy Petree

The 2012 Bank of America 500 was a NASCAR Sprint Cup Series race held on October 13, 2012, at Charlotte Motor Speedway in Concord, North Carolina. Contested over 334 laps on the 1.5-mile (2.4 km) asphalt quad-oval, it was the thirty-first race of the 2012 Sprint Cup Series season, as well as the fifth race in the ten-race Chase for the Sprint Cup, which ends the season.

Clint Bowyer of Michael Waltrip Racing won the race, his third of the season, while Denny Hamlin finished second and Jimmie Johnson was third.

== Report ==
=== Background ===
Aerial view of Charlotte Motor Speedway, the location of the race.

Charlotte Motor Speedway is one of ten intermediate tracks to hold NASCAR races. The standard track at Charlotte Motor Speedway is a four-turn quad-oval track that is 1.5 miles (2.4 km) long. The track's turns are banked at twenty-four degrees, while the front stretch, the location of the finish line, is five degrees. The back stretch, opposite of the front, also had a five degree banking. The racetrack has seats for 140,000 spectators.

Before the race, Brad Keselowski led the Drivers' Championship with 2,179 points, and Jimmie Johnson stood in second with 2,165 points. Denny Hamlin followed in third with 2,156 points, thirteen points ahead of Kasey Kahne and seventeen ahead of Clint Bowyer in fourth and fifth. Jeff Gordon with 2,137 was four points ahead of Tony Stewart, as Martin Truex Jr. with 2,131 points, was one point ahead of Greg Biffle and Kevin Harvick. Dale Earnhardt Jr. and Matt Kenseth was eleventh and twelfth with 2,128 and 2,117 points, respectively.

In the Manufacturers' Championship, Chevrolet was leading with 203 points, twenty-seven points ahead of Toyota. Ford, with 147 points, was thirteen points ahead of Dodge in the battle for third. Matt Kenseth is the defending race winner after winning the event in 2011.

On October 11, 2012, Hendrick Motorsports announced that Earnhardt Jr. would not participate in the race because of being diagnosed with a concussion one day earlier. Instead, Regan Smith, who was supposed to drive for the Phoenix Racing, would replace Earnhardt Jr., while A. J. Allmendinger would be the interim driver for Smith. Earnhardt Jr. reported that he experienced concussion symptoms after a crash at Kansas Speedway during a tire test on August 29, 2012. He claimed that he had no symptoms before the Good Sam Roadside Assistance 500, but after being involved in the Big One on the final lap, he reported having concussion symptoms that lasted more than three days later, convincing him to see a neurologist, who said that Earnhardt Jr. needed to miss the next two races because of a concussion. It was the first time since the 1979 Southern 500 (the last race his father missed after an accident at Pocono in his rookie season) that a Sprint Cup race did not have an Earnhardt in the field, and the first race in the modern era that did not have a driver from North Carolina in the field, as Scott Riggs, the only North Carolina driver entered, failed to qualify.

=== Practice and qualifying ===
Three practice sessions were held over the course of the race weekend. The first, held on Thursday, October 11, was used to set the qualifying order. The session was led by Denny Hamlin with a time of 28.170 seconds. Mark Martin was second, only .037 seconds behind Hamlin, with Matt Kenseth in third .016 seconds behind Martin. Joey Logano and Gordon completed the top five, while Kyle Busch, Regan Smith, Kasey Kahne, Jimmie Johnson, and Brad Keselowski completed the top 10.

Qualifying was held after the first practice session. 47 cars took 2 qualifying laps to set the 43 car field. Greg Biffle would win the pole position, setting a track record with a lap of 27.877 seconds, breaking the old track record set by Elliott Sadler in 2005. After being awarded the pole, Biffle proclaimed his excitement during the lap. "I was super excited about that lap because I drove it farther into Turn 1 than I thought would work," Mark Martin would claim the outside pole, Ryan Newman claimed the third position, and Chase drivers Bowyer, Johnson, Truex Jr., Kenseth, Hamlin, and Kahne rounded out the top 10.

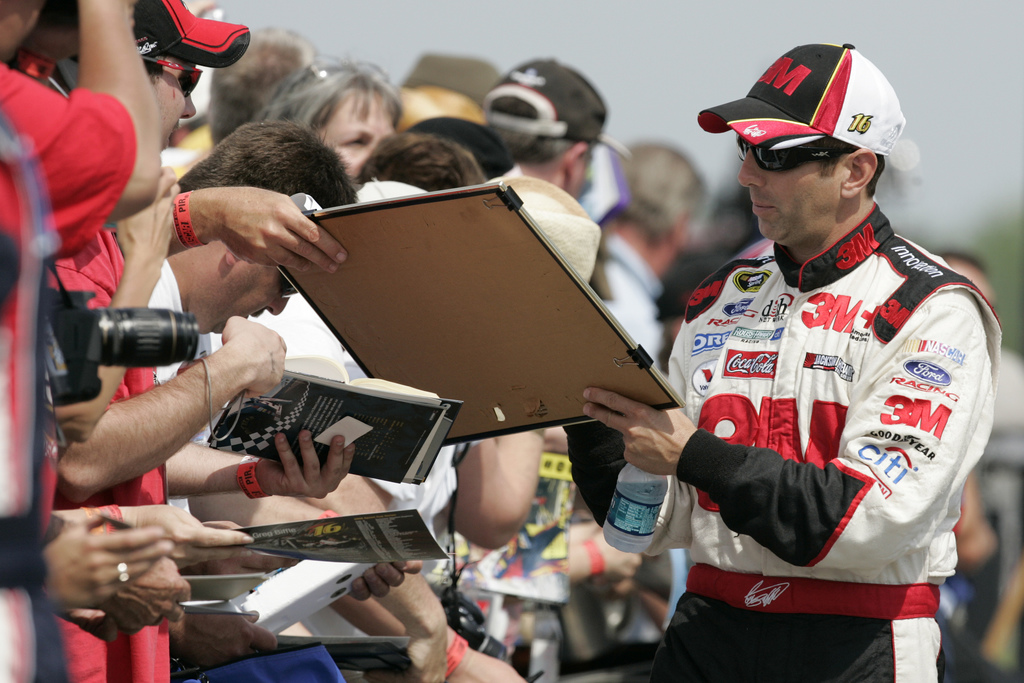
Greg Biffle won the pole, setting a new track record

A second practice was held on Friday, with Greg Biffle leading the pack with a time of 28.867. Kahne, Harvick, Johnson, Martin, Truex Jr., Keselowski, Smith, Newman, and Gordon completed the top 10. Happy Hour was also held on Friday, led by Kyle Busch.

=== Race ===
The race was held under clear conditions with light winds. Pre-race ceremonies began with the Air Force ROTC Detachment 592 from UNC-Charlotte. K-Love CEO Mike Novak then delivered the invocation, followed by gospel group NewSong delivering the National Anthem. At 7:40, Wounded Warrior Project executive vice president Dave Nevins gave the command to start engines. Ryan Newman, Juan Pablo Montoya, Jeff Burton, and Reed Sorenson went to the rear of the field due to engine changes, while Travis Kvapil and David Gilliland went to the back for unapproved transmission changes. The race started at 7:50, with front row starters Biffle and Martin running side by side for the first 4 laps of the race, with Biffle clearing Martin in turn 4. The first caution came out when Chase driver Matt Kenseth had a left rear tire go down, resulting in him spinning in turn 4 on lap 11.

On the lap 15 restart, Biffle continued to lead when David Ragan, Jeff Burton, and Tony Stewart all collided.

== Results ==
=== Qualifying ===
Grid	No.	Driver	Team	Manufacturer	Time	Speed
1	16	Greg Biffle	Roush Fenway Racing	Ford	27.877	193.708
2	55	Mark Martin	Michael Waltrip Racing	Toyota	27.927	193.361
3	39	Ryan Newman	Stewart–Haas Racing	Chevrolet	27.943	193.251
4	15	Clint Bowyer	Michael Waltrip Racing	Toyota	27.973	193.043
5	48	Jimmie Johnson	Hendrick Motorsports	Chevrolet	27.980	192.995
6	56	Martin Truex Jr.	Michael Waltrip Racing	Toyota	27.991	192.919
7	17	Matt Kenseth	Roush Fenway Racing	Ford	27.996	192.885
8	18	Kyle Busch	Joe Gibbs Racing	Toyota	28.001	192.850
9	11	Denny Hamlin	Joe Gibbs Racing	Toyota	28.008	192.802
10	5	Kasey Kahne	Hendrick Motorsports	Chevrolet	28.031	192.644
11	29	Kevin Harvick	Richard Childress Racing	Chevrolet	28.032	192.637
12	20	Joey Logano	Joe Gibbs Racing	Toyota	28.043	192.561
13	24	Jeff Gordon	Hendrick Motorsports	Chevrolet	28.094	192.212
14	22	Sam Hornish Jr.	Penske Racing	Dodge	28.174	191.666
15	47	Bobby Labonte	JTG Daugherty Racing	Toyota	28.183	191.605
16	21	Trevor Bayne	Wood Brothers Racing	Ford	28.229	191.293
17	43	Aric Almirola	Richard Petty Motorsports	Ford	28.230	191.286
18	9	Marcos Ambrose	Richard Petty Motorsports	Ford	28.231	191.279
19	99	Carl Edwards	Roush Fenway Racing	Ford	28.236	191.245
20	2	Brad Keselowski	Penske Racing	Dodge	28.238	191.232
21	78	Kurt Busch	Furniture Row Racing	Chevrolet	28.239	191.225
22	42	Juan Pablo Montoya	Earnhardt Ganassi Racing	Chevrolet	28.318	190.691
23	95	Scott Speed	Leavine Family Racing	Ford	28.318	190.691
24	27	Paul Menard	Richard Childress Racing	Chevrolet	28.329	190.617
25	34	David Ragan	Front Row Motorsports	Ford	28.364	190.382
26	88	Regan Smith	Hendrick Motorsports	Chevrolet	28.394	190.181
27	13	Casey Mears	Germain Racing	Ford	28.417	190.027
28	19	Mike Bliss	Humphrey Smith Racing	Toyota	28.417	190.027
29	6	Ricky Stenhouse Jr.	Roush Fenway Racing	Ford	28.423	189.987
30	1	Jamie McMurray	Earnhardt Ganassi Racing	Chevrolet	28.441	189.867
31	30	David Stremme	Inception Motorsports	Toyota	28.468	189.687
32	14	Tony Stewart	Stewart–Haas Racing	Chevrolet	28.483	189.587
33	98	Michael McDowell	Phil Parsons Racing	Ford	28.483	189.587
34	10	David Reutimann	Tommy Baldwin Racing	Chevrolet	28.493	189.520
35	37	J. J. Yeley	Max Q Motorsports	Chevrolet	28.520	189.341
36	38	David Gilliland	Front Row Motorsports	Ford	28.533	189.255
37	83	Landon Cassill	BK Racing	Toyota	28.546	189.168
38	51	A. J. Allmendinger	Phoenix Racing	Chevrolet	28.550	189.142
39	31	Jeff Burton	Richard Childress Racing	Chevrolet	28.652	188.469
40	32	Timmy Hill	FAS Lane Racing	Ford	28.689	188.225
41	93	Travis Kvapil	BK Racing	Toyota	28.918	186.735
42	36	Dave Blaney	Tommy Baldwin Racing	Chevrolet	28.982	186.323
43	91	Reed Sorenson	Humphrey Smith Racing	Toyota	28.556	189.102
Failed to Qualify
	87	Joe Nemechek	NEMCO Motorsports	Toyota	28.581	188.937
	26	Josh Wise	Front Row Motorsports	Ford	28.858	187.123
	23	Scott Riggs	R3 Motorsports	Chevrolet	29.191	184.989
	33	Cole Whitt	Circle Sport	Chevrolet	29.425	183.517

=== Race results ===
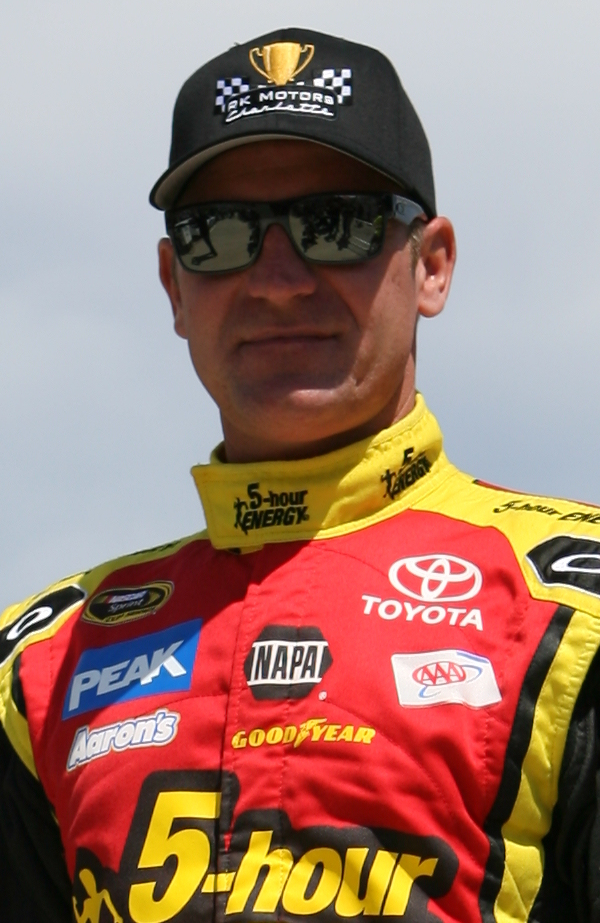
Clint Bowyer won the race.

Pos	Car	Driver	Team	Manufacturer	Laps	Points
1	15	Clint Bowyer	Michael Waltrip Racing	Toyota	334	47
2	11	Denny Hamlin	Joe Gibbs Racing	Toyota	334	43
3	48	Jimmie Johnson	Hendrick Motorsports	Chevrolet	334	42
4	16	Greg Biffle	Roush-Fenway Racing	Ford	334	41
5	18	Kyle Busch	Joe Gibbs Racing	Toyota	334	39
6	55	Mark Martin	Michael Waltrip Racing	Toyota	334	39
7	99	Carl Edwards	Roush-Fenway Racing	Ford	334	37
8	5	Kasey Kahne	Hendrick Motorsports	Chevrolet	334	36
9	20	Joey Logano	Joe Gibbs Racing	Toyota	334	35
10	56	Martin Truex Jr.	Michael Waltrip Racing	Toyota	334	34
11	2	Brad Keselowski	Penske Racing	Dodge	334	35
12	43	Aric Almirola	Richard Petty Motorsports	Ford	334	32
13	14	Tony Stewart	Stewart-Haas Racing	Chevrolet	334	31
14	17	Matt Kenseth	Roush-Fenway Racing	Ford	334	30
15	22	Sam Hornish Jr.	Penske Racing	Dodge	334	0
16	29	Kevin Harvick	Richard Childress Racing	Chevrolet	334	28
17	1	Jamie McMurray	Earnhardt Ganassi Racing	Chevrolet	334	27
18	24	Jeff Gordon	Hendrick Motorsports	Chevrolet	332	27
19	42	Juan Pablo Montoya	Earnhardt Ganassi Racing	Chevrolet	332	25
20	39	Ryan Newman	Stewart–Haas Racing	Chevrolet	332	24
21	78	Kurt Busch	Furniture Row Racing	Chevrolet	332	23
22	21	Trevor Bayne	Wood Brothers Racing	Ford	332	0
23	38	David Gilliland	Front Row Motorsports	Ford	331	21
24	51	A. J. Allmendinger	Phoenix Racing	Chevrolet	330	20
25	93	Travis Kvapil	BK Racing	Toyota	330	19
26	83	Landon Cassill	BK Racing	Toyota	329	18
27	27	Paul Menard	Richard Childress Racing	Chevrolet	328	17
28	31	Jeff Burton	Richard Childress Racing	Chevrolet	327	16
29	13	Casey Mears	Germain Racing	Ford	327	15
30	10	David Reutimann	Tommy Baldwin Racing	Chevrolet	327	14
31	98	Michael McDowell	Phil Parsons Racing	Ford	326	13
32	47	Bobby Labonte	JTG Daugherty Racing	Toyota	324	12
33	9	Marcos Ambrose	Richard Petty Motorsports	Ford	303	12
34	35	David Ragan	Front Row Motorsports	Ford	287	10
35	6	Ricky Stenhouse Jr.	Roush-Fenway Racing	Ford	190	0
36	32	Timmy Hill	FAS Lane Racing	Ford	182	0
37	30	David Stremme	Inception Motorsports	Toyota	62	7
38	88	Regan Smith	Hendrick Motorsports	Chevrolet	61	6
39	19	Mike Bliss	Humphrey Smith Racing	Toyota	53	0
40	95	Scott Speed	Leavine Family Racing	Ford	50	4
41	91	Reed Sorenson	Humphrey Smith Racing	Toyota	32	0
42	37	J. J. Yeley	Max Q Motorsports	Ford	30	2
43	36	Dave Blaney	Tommy Baldwin Racing	Chevrolet	25	1

== Standings after the race ==
Drivers' Championship standings

	Pos	Driver	Points
	1	Brad Keselowski	2214
	2	Jimmie Johnson	2207 (–7)
	3	Denny Hamlin	2199 (–15)
1	4	Clint Bowyer	2186 (–28)
1	5	Kasey Kahne	2179 (–35)

Manufacturers' Championship standings

Pos	Manufacturer	Points
1	Chevrolet	209
2	Toyota	185
3	Ford	151
4	Dodge	137

- Note: Only the top five positions are included for the driver standings.

Previous race: 2012 Good Sam Roadside Assistance 500	Sprint Cup Series; 2012 season	Next race: 2012 Hollywood Casino 400
