= 2011 Good Sam Club 500 =

Race details
- Race 32 of 36 in the 2011 NASCAR Sprint Cup Series
- The 2011 Good Sam 500 program cover.
- Date: October 23, 2011
- Location: Talladega Superspeedway, Talladega, Alabama
- Course: Permanent racing facility
- Course length: 2.66 miles (4.28 km)
- Distance: 188 laps, 500.08 mi (804.8 km)
- Weather: Temperatures up to 72 °F (22 °C); wind speeds up to 5.1 miles per hour (8.2 km/h)
- Average speed: 143.404 miles per hour (230.786 km/h)

Pole position
Driver	Mark Martin	Hendrick Motorsports
- Time: 52.799

Most laps led
Driver	Tony Stewart	Stewart–Haas Racing
- Laps: 30

Winner
No. 33	Clint Bowyer	Richard Childress Racing

Television in the United States
- Network: ESPN
- Announcers: Allen Bestwick, Dale Jarrett and Andy Petree

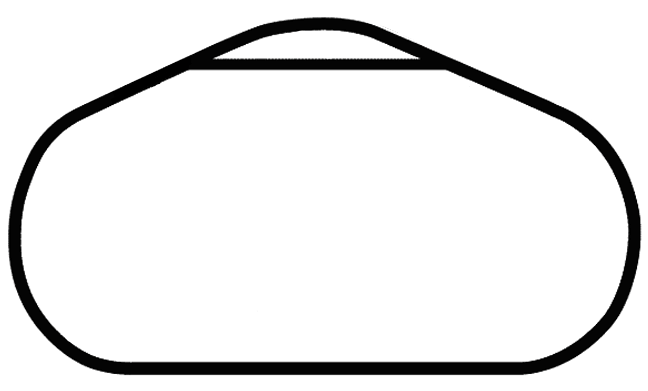
The layout of Talladega Superspeedway, the venue where the race was held.

The 2011 Good Sam Club 500 was a NASCAR Sprint Cup Series race held on October 23, 2011 at Talladega Superspeedway in Talladega, Alabama. Clint Bowyer defended his win in the previous year's race by slingshotting past his Richard Childress Racing teammate Jeff Burton on the final lap. It was the 100th career win for Richard Childress Racing.

== Qualifying ==
Mark Martin won the pole position with a time of 52.799, beating Jimmie Johnson who had a time of 52.801.

Pos.	No.	Driver	Make	Team	Time	Avg. Speed
1	5	Mark Martin	Chevrolet	Hendrick Motorsports	52.799	181.367
2	48	Jimmie Johnson	Chevrolet	Hendrick Motorsports	52.801	181.360
3	33	Clint Bowyer	Chevrolet	Richard Childress Racing	52.835	181.243
4	21	Trevor Bayne	Ford	Wood Brothers Racing	52.903	181.011
5	24	Jeff Gordon	Chevrolet	Hendrick Motorsports	52.930	180.918
6	88	Dale Earnhardt, Jr.	Chevrolet	Hendrick Motorsports	52.934	180.905
7	27	Paul Menard	Chevrolet	Richard Childress Racing	53.007	180.655
8	6	David Ragan	Ford	Roush Fenway Racing	53.021	180.608
9	99	Carl Edwards	Ford	Roush Fenway Racing	53.138	180.210
10	39	Ryan Newman	Chevrolet	Stewart–Haas Racing	53.140	180.203
11	17	Matt Kenseth	Ford	Roush Fenway Racing	53.142	180.196
12	14	Tony Stewart	Chevrolet	Stewart–Haas Racing	53.168	180.108
13	29	Kevin Harvick	Chevrolet	Richard Childress Racing	53.186	180.047
14	22	Kurt Busch	Dodge	Penske Racing	53.209	179.970
15	42	Juan Pablo Montoya	Chevrolet	Earnhardt Ganassi Racing	53.237	179.875
16	2	Brad Keselowski	Dodge	Penske Racing	53.250	179.831
17	38	Travis Kvapil	Ford	Front Row Motorsports	53.250	179.831
18	16	Greg Biffle	Ford	Roush Fenway Racing	53.264	179.784
19	9	Marcos Ambrose	Ford	Richard Petty Motorsports	53.278	179.736
20	97	Kevin Conway	Toyota	NEMCO Motorsports	53.291	179.693
21	47	Bobby Labonte	Toyota	JTG Daugherty Racing	53.297	179.672
22	78	Regan Smith	Chevrolet	Furniture Row Racing	53.305	179.645
23	15	Michael Waltrip	Toyota	Michael Waltrip Racing	53.310	179.629
24	43	A.J. Allmendinger	Ford	Richard Petty Motorsports	53.318	179.602
25	31	Jeff Burton	Chevrolet	Richard Childress Racing	53.318	179.602
26	4	Kasey Kahne	Toyota	Red Bull Racing	53.326	179.575
27	87	Joe Nemechek	Toyota	NEMCO Motorsports	53.372	179.420
28	55	J.J. Yeley	Ford	Prism Motorsports	53.393	179.349
29	66	Michael McDowell	Toyota	Prism Motorsports	53.394	179.346
30	83	Brian Vickers	Toyota	Red Bull Racing	53.481	179.054
31	11	Denny Hamlin	Toyota	Joe Gibbs Racing	53.514	178.944
32	32	Terry Labonte	Ford	FAS Lane Racing	53.528	178.897
33	71	Andy Lally	Ford	TRG Motorsports	53.532	178.884
34	18	Kyle Busch	Toyota	Joe Gibbs Racing	53.563	178.780
35	20	Joey Logano	Toyota	Joe Gibbs Racing	53.565	178.773
36	00	David Reutimann	Toyota	Michael Waltrip Racing	53.595	178.673
37	56	Martin Truex, Jr.	Toyota	Michael Waltrip Racing	53.596	178.670
38	51	Landon Cassill	Chevrolet	Phoenix Racing	53.616	178.603
39	1	Jamie McMurray	Chevrolet	Earnhardt Ganassi Racing	53.641	178.520
40	34	David Gilliland	Ford	Front Row Motorsports	53.669	178.427
41	36	Dave Blaney	Chevrolet	Tommy Baldwin Racing	53.696	178.337
42	13	Casey Mears	Toyota	Germain Racing	54.262	176.477
43	7	Robby Gordon	Dodge	Robby Gordon Motorsports	53.627	178.567
Failed to qualify
44	35	Geoffrey Bodine	Chevrolet	Tommy Baldwin Racing	53.637	178.533
45	46	Scott Speed	Ford	Whitney Motorsports	53.956	177.478
46	77	T.J. Bell	Ford	TRG Motorsports	54.080	177.071
47	37	Josh Wise	Ford	Max Q Motorsports	54.085	177.055

== Race ==
The race saw 9 caution flags for 37 laps under caution. The race took about 3 and half hours.

== Race results ==
Finish	No.	Driver	Make	Team	Laps	Led	Status	Pts	Winnings
1	33	Clint Bowyer	Chevrolet	Richard Childress Racing	188	25	running	47	$260,558
2	31	Jeff Burton	Chevrolet	Richard Childress Racing	188	26	running	43	$170,500
3	36	Dave Blaney	Chevrolet	Tommy Baldwin Racing	188	1	running	42	$160,833
4	2	Brad Keselowski	Dodge	Penske Racing	188	1	running	41	$143,483
5	83	Brian Vickers	Toyota	Red Bull Racing	188	3	running	40	$135,964
6	4	Kasey Kahne	Toyota	Red Bull Racing	188	4	running	39	$122,033
7	14	Tony Stewart	Chevrolet	Stewart–Haas Racing	188	30	running	39	$143,433
8	11	Denny Hamlin	Toyota	Joe Gibbs Racing	188	0	running	36	$134,000
9	15	Michael Waltrip	Toyota	Michael Waltrip Racing	188	1	running	36	$83,500
10	56	Martin Truex, Jr.	Toyota	Michael Waltrip Racing	188	0	running	9	$94,825
11	99	Carl Edwards	Ford	Roush Fenway Racing	188	1	running	34	$128,866
12	27	Paul Menard	Chevrolet	Richard Childress Racing	188	0	running	32	$91,775
13	00	David Reutimann	Toyota	Michael Waltrip Racing	188	0	running	6	$111,308
14	16	Greg Biffle	Ford	Roush Fenway Racing	188	1	running	31	$95,825
15	21	Trevor Bayne	Ford	Wood Brothers Racing	188	0	running	0	$81,325
16	51	Landon Cassill	Chevrolet	Phoenix Racing	188	0	running	0	$91,608
17	13	Casey Mears	Toyota	Germain Racing	188	0	running	27	$79,050
18	17	Matt Kenseth	Ford	Roush Fenway Racing	188	21	running	27	$121,836
19	9	Marcos Ambrose	Ford	Richard Petty Motorsports	188	3	running	26	$108,366
20	5	Mark Martin	Chevrolet	Hendrick Motorsports	188	2	running	25	$93,250
21	38	Travis Kvapil	Ford	Front Row Motorsports	188	1	running	0	$88,097
22	34	David Gilliland	Ford	Front Row Motorsports	188	0	running	22	$77,175
23	42	Juan Pablo Montoya	Chevrolet	Earnhardt Ganassi Racing	188	16	running	22	$115,783
24	20	Joey Logano	Toyota	Joe Gibbs Racing	188	0	running	20	$84,525
25	88	Dale Earnhardt, Jr.	Chevrolet	Hendrick Motorsports	188	2	running	20	$84,225
26	48	Jimmie Johnson	Chevrolet	Hendrick Motorsports	188	1	running	19	$127,611
27	24	Jeff Gordon	Chevrolet	Hendrick Motorsports	188	1	running	18	$112,461
28	6	David Ragan	Ford	Roush Fenway Racing	188	1	running	17	$81,250
29	1	Jamie McMurray	Chevrolet	Earnhardt Ganassi Racing	184	12	running	16	$111,189
30	78	Regan Smith	Chevrolet	Furniture Row Racing	180	0	crash	14	$98,745
31	43	A.J. Allmendinger	Ford	Richard Petty Motorsports	179	0	running	13	$109,686
32	29	Kevin Harvick	Chevrolet	Richard Childress Racing	179	13	running	13	$121,786
33	18	Kyle Busch	Toyota	Joe Gibbs Racing	175	5	running	12	$121,691
34	32	Terry Labonte	Ford	FAS Lane Racing	175	0	running	10	$71,700
35	47	Bobby Labonte	Toyota	JTG Daugherty Racing	173	0	crash	-16	$97,870
36	22	Kurt Busch	Dodge	Penske Racing	173	1	crash	9	$115,950
37	7	Robby Gordon	Dodge	Robby Gordon Motorsports	173	10	rear-gear	8	$71,250
38	39	Ryan Newman	Chevrolet	Stewart–Haas Racing	172	5	running	7	$113,200
39	71	Andy Lally	Ford	TRG Motorsports	162	1	crash	6	$80,500
40	66	Michael McDowell	Toyota	Prism Motorsports	6	0	clutch	4	$70,860
41	87	Joe Nemechek	Toyota	NEMCO Motorsports	4	0	rear-gear	0	$70,710
42	55	J.J. Yeley	Ford	Prism Motorsports	3	0	wheel	2	$70580
43	97	Kevin Conway	Toyota	NEMCO Motorsports	2	0	vibration	0	$70,964

Previous race: 2011 Bank of America 500	Sprint Cup Series; 2011 season	Next race: 2011 Tums Fast Relief 500
