= Mike Bliss =

American racing driver (born 1965)

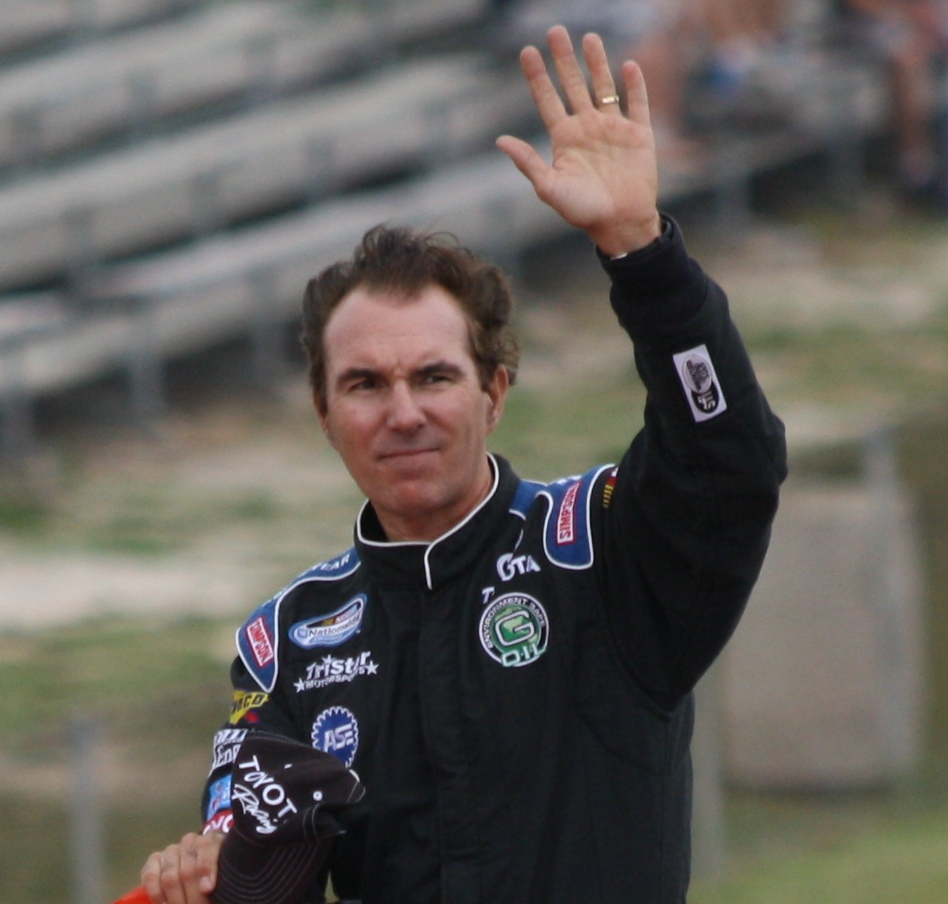
- Bliss at Road America in 2012
- Born: Michael Duane Bliss; April 5, 1965 (age 61); Milwaukie, Oregon, U.S.
- Achievements: 1993 USAC Silver Crown Champion; 2002 NASCAR Craftsman Truck Series Champion
- Awards: West Coast Stock Car Hall of Fame (2020)

NASCAR Cup Series career
- 179 races run over 17 years
- 2015 position: 66th
- Best finish: 28th (2005)
- First race: 1998 NAPA Autocare 500 (Martinsville)
- Last race: 2015 Bojangles' Southern 500 (Darlington)
Wins	Top tens	Poles
0	7	0

NASCAR O'Reilly Auto Parts Series career
- 359 races run over 18 years
- 2016 position: 119th
- Best finish: 5th (2004, 2008, 2009)
- First race: 1998 Kenwood Home & Car Audio 300 (California)
- Last race: 2016 VisitMyrtleBeach.com 300 (Kentucky)
- First win: 2004 Lowe's Presents the SpongeBob SquarePants Movie 300 (Charlotte)
- Last win: 2009 Carquest Auto Parts 300 (Charlotte)
Wins	Top tens	Poles
2	76	3

NASCAR FedEx Freight Truck Series career
- 206 races run over 13 years
- 2016 position: 46th
- Best finish: 1st (2002)
- First race: 1995 Skoal Bandit Copper World Classic (Phoenix)
- Last race: 2016 Rattlesnake 400 (Texas)
- First win: 1995 Lowe's 150 (North Wilkesboro)
- Last win: 2006 EasyCare Vehicle Service Contracts 200 (Atlanta)
Wins	Top tens	Poles
13	109	18
- Statistics up to date as of September 24, 2016.

Michael Duane Bliss (born April 5, 1965) is an American former professional stock car racing driver. A journeyman NASCAR competitor and the 2002 NASCAR Craftsman Truck Series champion, he has run in all three national series.

== Racing career ==
Bliss began racing at the age of ten. He captured his first major victory in 1993 with the USAC Silver Crown National Championship.

=== 1995–1999 ===
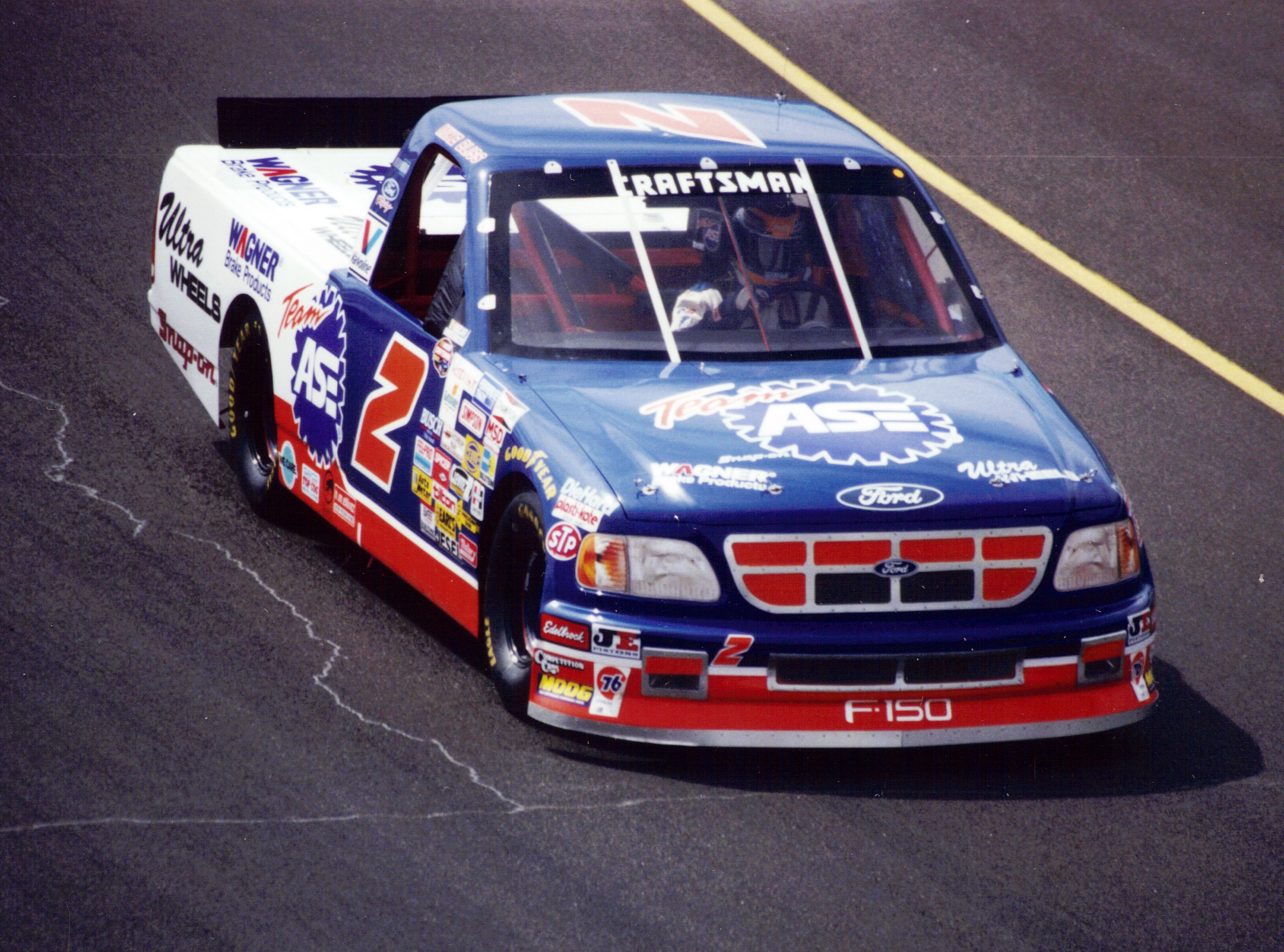
Bliss racing for Ultra Motorsports in 1996

Bliss began racing in NASCAR in 1995, driving the Nos. 08 and 2 Ford F-150 for Ultra Motorsports in the new Craftsman Truck Series. Competing in nineteen out of twenty races, Bliss picked up a win at North Wilkesboro Speedway and finished eighth in points. The next year, with sponsorship from Team ASE Racing, he won at Evergreen and I-70 and finished fifth in points. In 1998, he made his debut in the upper-NASCAR ranks. First, he finished 26th at the Kenwood Home & Car Audio 300 driving a car owned by Kevin Schwantz, then two weeks later, finished seventh at Indianapolis Raceway Park for Michael Waltrip Racing. He also ran a pair of Winston Cup races that season, finishing 25th at Martinsville Speedway in the No. 96 for American Equipment Racing.

After winning six poles and finishing tenth in points in 1998, Bliss announced he would not return to the team after 1998, and signed with Roush Racing to drive the No. 99 Exide Batteries Ford. He picked up a win at Heartland Park Topeka and finished ninth in points. During the season, he began to pick up offers to run in the Cup Series, and left Roush. In 1999, Bliss ran two Winston Cup races for Bahari Racing with sponsorship from Sara Lee products.

=== 2000–2004 ===
In 2000, Bliss signed to drive the No. 14 Conseco Pontiac Grand Prix owned by A.J. Foyt Racing in a bid for NASCAR Winston Cup Series Rookie of the Year honors. Because the team had no owner's points, Bliss failed to qualify for three out of the first four races of the season, and he was quickly released. He soon signed to drive the No. 27 Pfizer/Viagra Pontiac for Eel River Racing. He had a ninth-place run at Talladega Superspeedway and finished 39th in points that year.

Bliss was unable to pick up a full-time ride for the 2001 season. He finished 40th at Daytona International Speedway in a one-race deal for David Ridling, but that team soon closed its doors. During the middle of the season, he briefly returned to Eel River after they fired their regular driver but he was unable to qualify for a race. Late in the season, he garnered a ninth-place run at South Boston in a one-race deal for IWX Racing's Steve Coulter.

In 2002, Coulter returned full-time to the Truck Series and signed Bliss as the driver. Bliss picked up five wins and won the Truck series championship. He would sign to drive the No. 20 Rockwell Automation Chevrolet for Joe Gibbs Racing in the Busch Series the following year, posting fourteen top-tens and finishing tenth in points. That same year, he competed in the International Race of Champions, winning at Chicagoland Speedway. He ran only one Winston Cup race in 2002, subbing for Jamie McMurray (who was subbing for the injured Sterling Marlin, but had a prior commitment) in the No. 40 Coors Light Dodge. In 2004, Bliss picked up his first career Busch win at Lowe's Motor Speedway and finished fifth in points. After he was declined a job as driver for Gibbs’ Cup program, Bliss announced his departure, and replaced Ward Burton at Haas CNC Racing’s Cup ride, posting a tenth-place run at Darlington Raceway.

Before leaving Joe Gibbs Racing, Bliss had his career-best finish to date in his Cup series career in the 2004 Chevy Rock & Roll 400. Bliss, driving the No. 80 Hunt's Ketchup JGR car, got penalized for speeding on pit road on lap 332. Despite this, he formed a tremendous comeback, climbing through the field during the final fifty laps, and finishing fourth, his first and only top-five finish in the series.

=== 2005–2009 ===
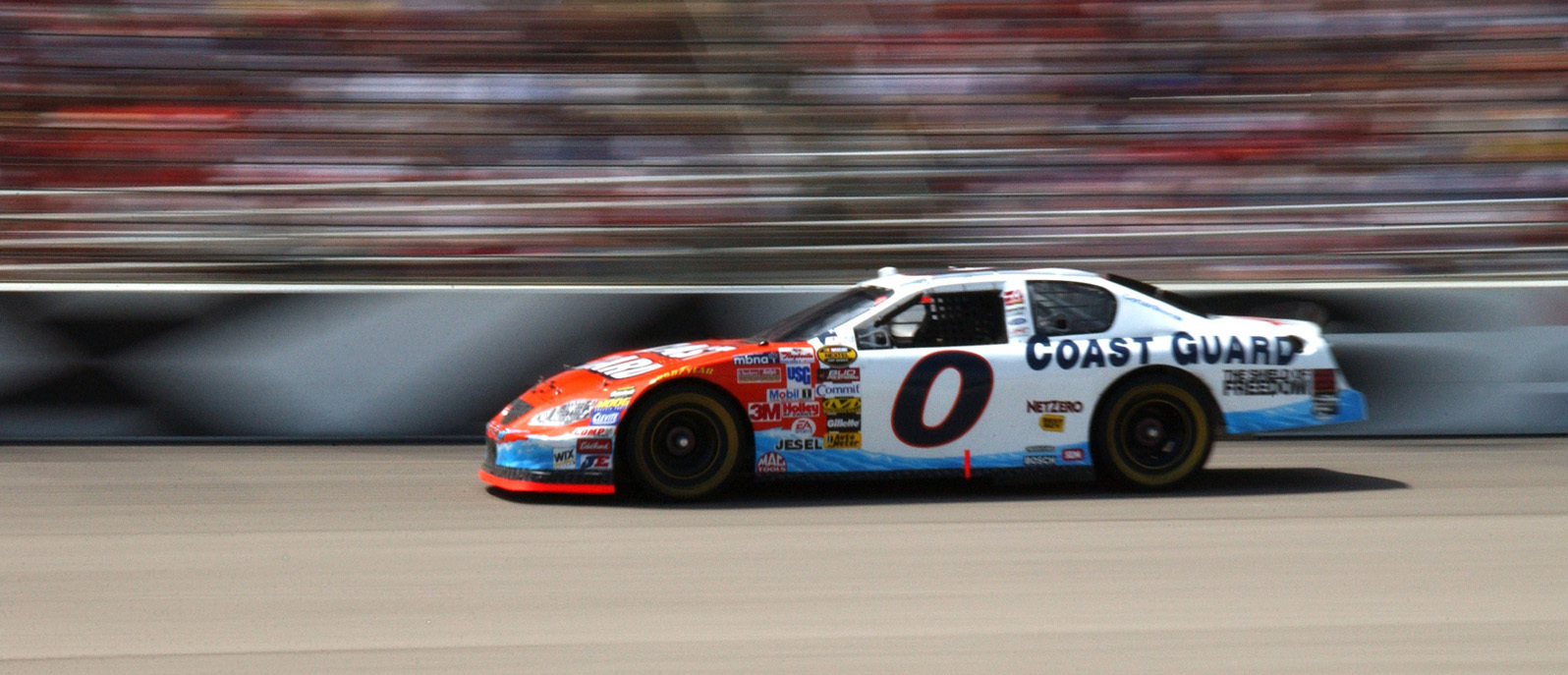
Bliss' No. 0 car at Texas Motor Speedway in 2005

Bliss signed with Haas CNC full-time in 2005, where he posted two top-tens in the latter half of the season and finished 28th in points. He came near to a Cup victory, nearly winning a large bonus paycheck and a win in the Nextel Open event but was crashed by Brian Vickers on the final lap in the final turn. Vickers won the race and the bonus paycheck, while Bliss slid across the finish line in second place. Bliss was visibly upset with Vickers in the post-race ceremonies saying "I just got plain dumped and I would not have wrecked him to win this race. Now he is in the big show (the All-Star Race) and I am not."

At the end of the year, Bliss departed to return to the No. 16 in the Truck Series, winning at Atlanta Motor Speedway and finishing 11th in the final standings. In addition, he ran a part-time in the Busch Series this season, splitting time between Frank Cicci Racing with Jim Kelly and SKI Motorsports. Late in the season, Bliss began driving the No. 49 BAM Racing Dodge Nextel Cup Car, and finished out the 2006 season driving the car for BAM. Bliss was signed to drive the car in 2007, but after a long string of DNQs, he resigned from the organization midway through the season. He drove the first four races of the 2007 Craftsman Truck season for Key Motorsports and drove thirteen more Truck races for Bobby Hamilton Racing in the No. 4 Dodge Ram. He also drove 22 races in the Busch Series for Fitz Motorsports in the No. 22 Dodge Charger with sponsorship from Supercuts and Family Dollar. He had signed to drive for Fitz full-time in 2008, but joined Phoenix Racing shortly after the season started. He matched his career-best 5th-place finish in points and also ran part-time schedules in Cup and Trucks.

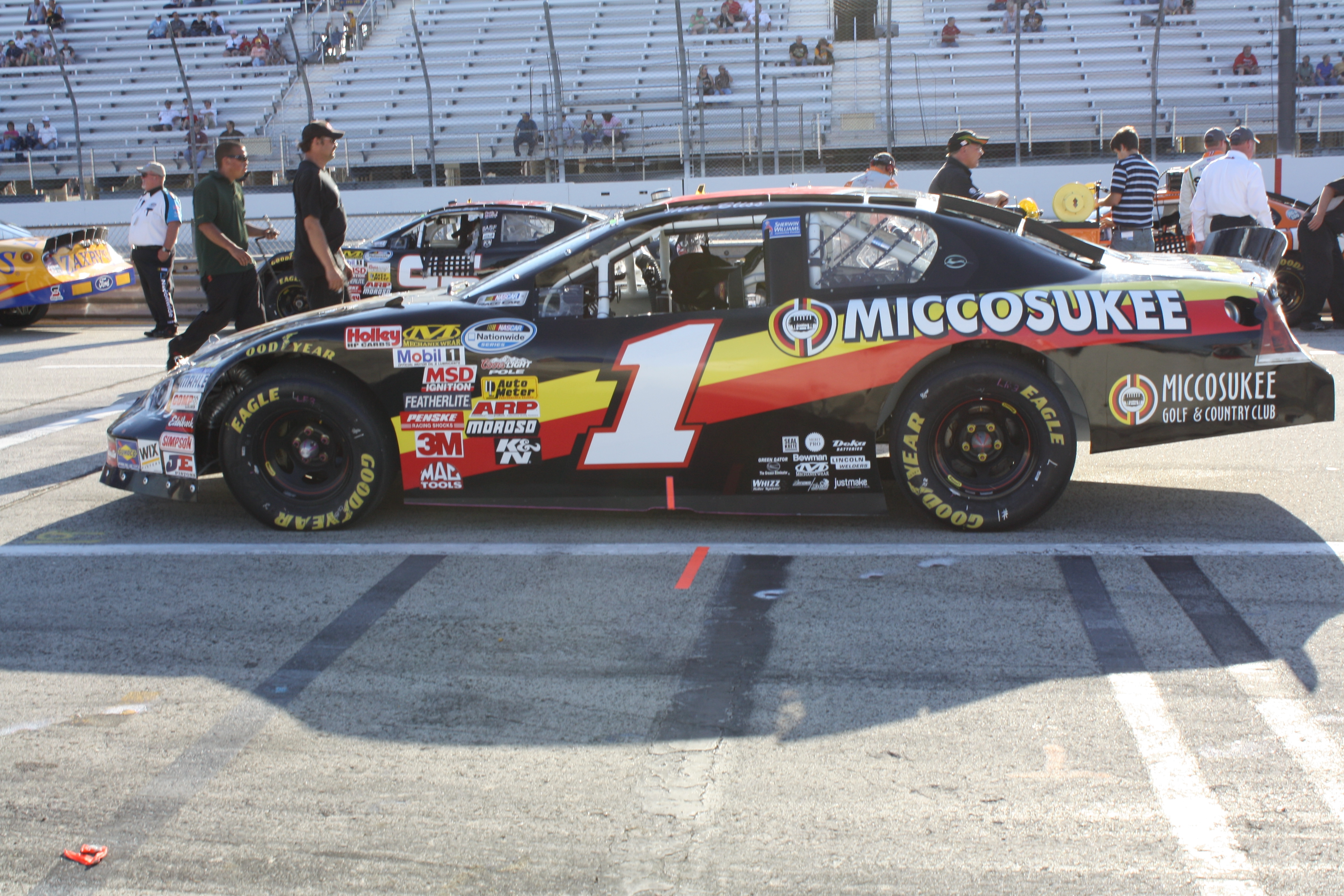
Bliss' Phoenix Racing car at the Milwaukee Mile in 2009.

Bliss scored his second career Nationwide win, taking advantage of his fuel mileage and getting a caution at the right time, at Lowes Motor Speedway, and NASCAR declared the race official after 170 of 200 laps due to rain. On August 2, 2009, Bliss was let go from Phoenix Racing but he still raced for the team in the Cup Series. He spent the rest of the season splitting time with MSRP Motorsports, NEMCO Motorsports, Key Motorsports, MacDonald Motorsports and CJM Racing before returning to Phoenix for the season finale at Homestead. Despite parking early in multiple races, his three top-fives and five top-ten finishes with CJM Racing pushed Bliss into fifth overall again. This was one spot better than when he was before being originally fired from the No. 1 car.

=== 2010–present ===
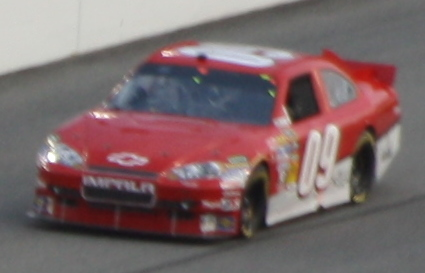
Bliss's No. 09 car at Richmond International Raceway in 2010

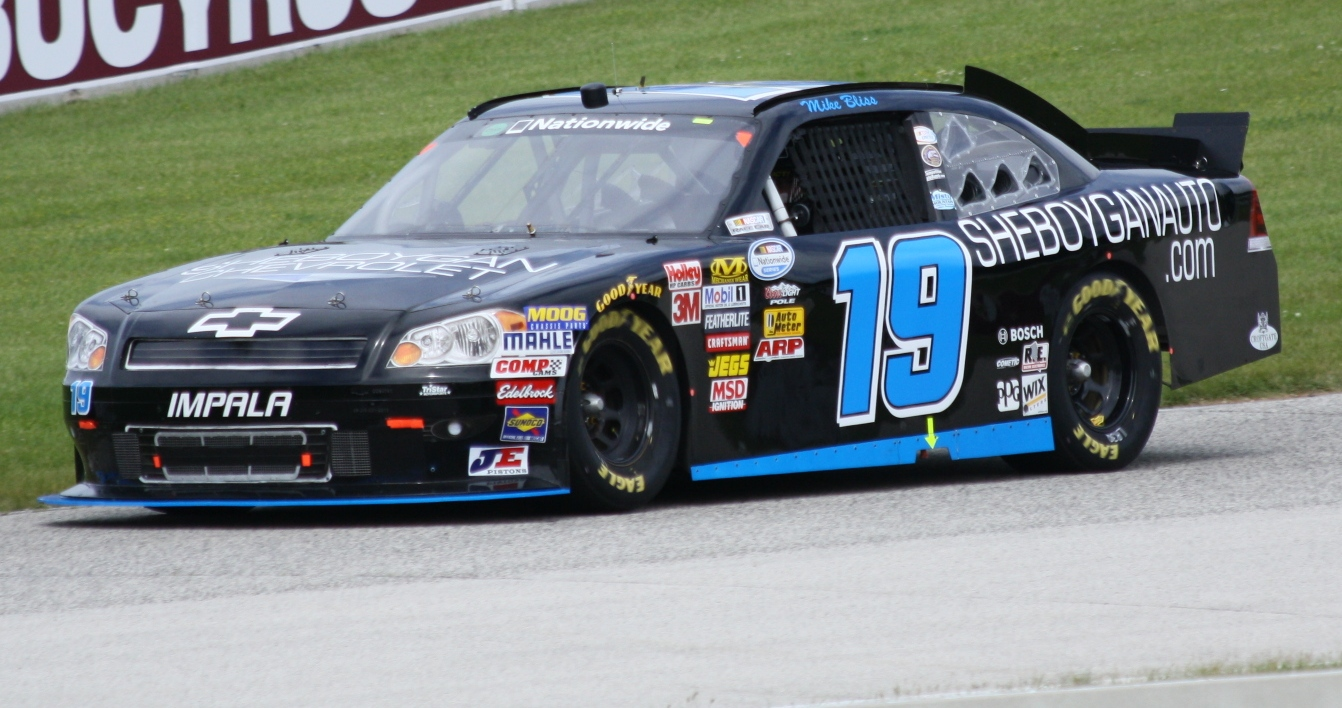
Bliss's 2011 Nationwide Series car

On December 3, 2009, it was announced that Bliss would return to the Sprint Cup Series full-time driving for Tommy Baldwin Racing in the No. 36 Wave Energy Drink Chevrolet Impala for the 2010 season. However, in April, Bliss parted ways with TBR after Phoenix, and returned to Phoenix Racing to drive the No. 09 beginning at Talladega.

He returned to full-time status in 2011 by joining Mark Smith's TriStar Motorsports in the Nationwide Series in the No. 19 Chevrolet. Despite being originally paired with old crew chief Dave Fuge, Fuge left the team to form a Nationwide Series team with Derrike Cope. After interim crew chief Wes Ward left the team, former TRG Motorsports crew chief Paul Clapprood took over, leading Bliss to a 12th-place points finish. For 2012, Bliss moved to the No. 44. When teammate Tayler Malsam was released from the No. 19 team in October, he drove it for the remainder of the year. He ended the season with one top-ten at Daytona in July where he finished eighth, and also finished eighth in points.

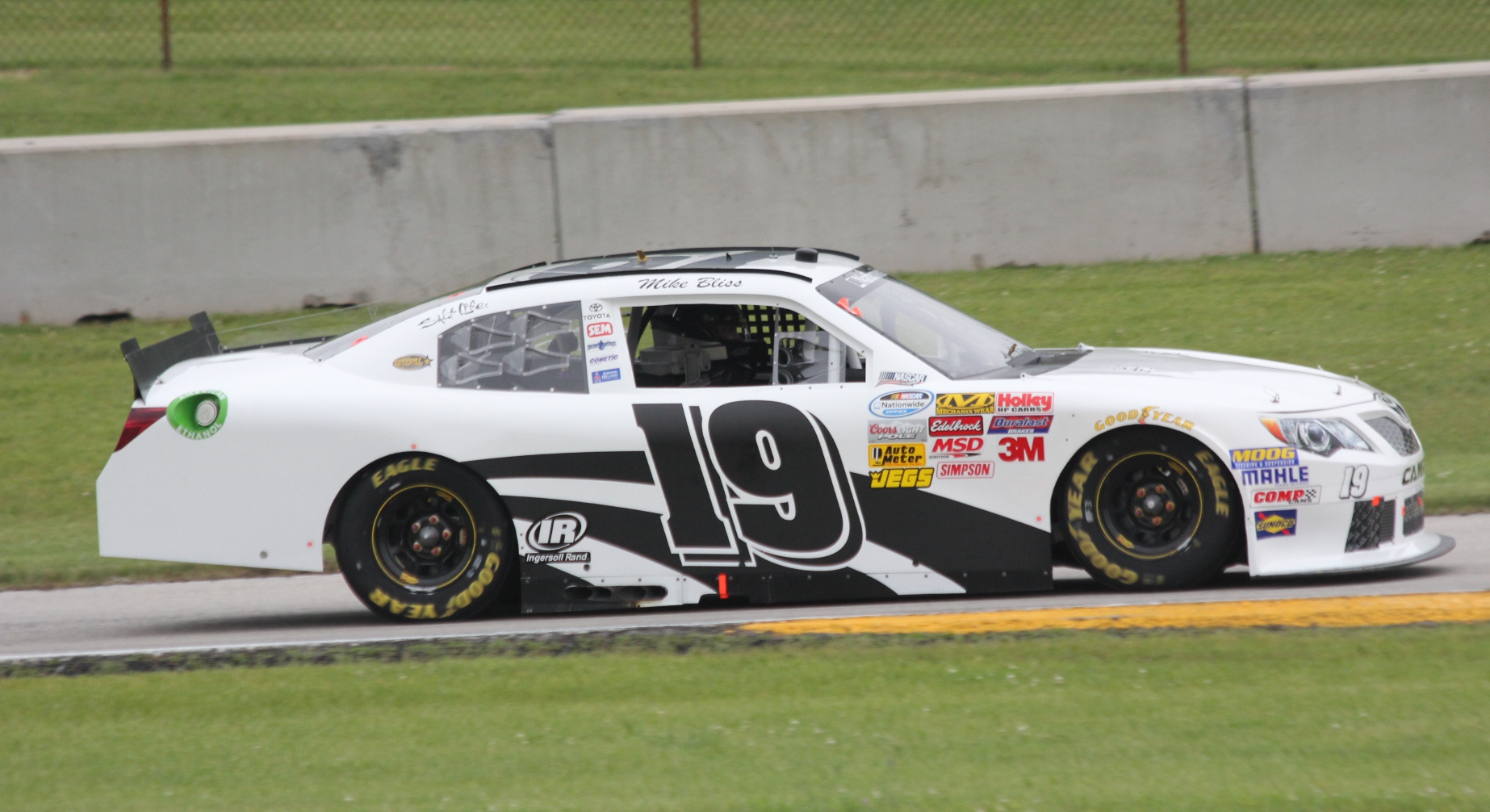
Bliss competing at Road America in 2014

While continuing to drive for TriStar in the Xfinity series through the 2014 season, he also drove part-time in the Sprint Cup Series for Smith's start and park Humphrey Smith Motorsports team. In September 2013, he drove Phoenix Racing's No. 51 Chevrolet in the Sprint Cup AdvoCare 500 at Atlanta Motor Speedway, which was James Finch's final start as a team owner. Bliss had scored Finch's last win during a Nationwide race at Charlotte in 2009.

Bliss served as standby driver for David Ragan in the No. 34 Front Row Motorsports Ford at the 2014 Pocono 400 with Ragan on paternity watch. Later in the season, Bliss joined BK Racing in the No. 93 Toyota for the Quaker State 400, finishing 41st.

Bliss was hired by Go FAS Racing to drive the No. 32 Sprint Cup car sharing it with Bobby Labonte and Boris Said in 2015, while being scheduled to continue driving full-time for TriStar in the Xfinity Series.

At the season opening Xfinity race at Daytona in 2015, Bliss was replaced by Scott Lagasse Jr. because Lagasse brought sponsorship. Bliss returned to the car and drove through the spring Talladega race before being permanently removed from the car because former teammate Eric McClure brought full sponsorship. Bliss' ride was replaced by the new No. 24 driven by McClure and the No. 19 was relegated to a start and park ride. Bliss moved to a mentoring role for TriStar drivers McClure, Blake Koch, Cale Conley, and David Starr. He also continued in his part-time Sprint Cup ride with Go FAS Racing, but was released from the team after the Quicken Loans 400 at Michigan International Speedway. Late in the season, he returned to the track in TriStar's No. 14 after Conley was released due to sponsorship issues, parking the car in the last three races of the season.

In 2016, Bliss made a handful of one-off starts across the Xfinity Series and the Truck Series for various teams including TriStar, Contreras Motorsports, and MB Motorsports. Since 2016, Bliss has made no further starts in any of NASCAR's top three series. He most recently served as a driving coach for Joe Graf Jr when he drove for Chad Bryant Racing in the ARCA Menards Series East in 2019.

== Motorsports career results ==
=== NASCAR ===
(key) (Bold – Pole position awarded by qualifying time. Italics – Pole position earned by points standings or practice time. * – Most laps led.)

==== Sprint Cup Series ====
NASCAR Sprint Cup Series results
Year	Team	No.	Make	1	2	3	4	5	6	7	8	9	10	11	12	13	14	15	16	17	18	19	20	21	22	23	24	25	26	27	28	29	30	31	32	33	34	35	36	NSCC	Pts	Ref
1995	Ultra Motorsports	08	Ford	DAY	CAR	RCH	ATL	DAR	BRI	NWS	MAR	TAL	SON	CLT	DOV	POC	MCH	DAY	NHA	POC	TAL	IND	GLN	MCH	BRI	DAR	RCH	DOV	MAR	NWS	CLT	CAR	PHO; DNQ	ATL						NA	-	
1997	Ultra Motorsports	02	Ford	DAY	CAR	RCH	ATL	DAR	TEX; DNQ	BRI	MAR	SON	TAL	CLT	DOV	POC	MCH	CAL	DAY	NHA	POC	IND	GLN	MCH	BRI	DAR	RCH; DNQ	NHA	DOV	MAR	CLT	TAL	CAR	PHO	ATL					NA	-	
1998	American Equipment Racing	96	Chevy	DAY	CAR	LVS	ATL	DAR	BRI	TEX	MAR	TAL	CAL	CLT	DOV	RCH	MCH	POC	SON	NHA	POC	IND	GLN	MCH	BRI	NHA	DAR	RCH	DOV	MAR; 25	CLT	TAL	DAY	PHO; 35	CAR	ATL				58th	146	
1999	Eel River Racing	30	Pontiac	DAY	CAR	LVS	ATL	DAR	TEX	BRI	MAR	TAL	CAL	RCH	CLT	DOV	MCH	POC	SON	DAY	NHA	POC	IND	GLN	MCH	BRI	DAR	RCH	NHA	DOV	MAR; 32	CLT	TAL	CAR; 42	PHO	HOM	ATL			58th	104	
2000	A. J. Foyt Racing	14	Pontiac	DAY; 33	CAR; DNQ	LVS; DNQ	ATL; DNQ	DAR	BRI	TEX																														39th	1748	
2000	Eel River Racing	27	Pontiac								MAR; 35	TAL; 24	CAL; 35	RCH; 41	CLT; 32	DOV; 35	MCH; 37	POC; 33	SON; 22	DAY; 28	NHA; 32	POC; 24	IND; 31	GLN; 39	MCH; 28	BRI; DNQ	DAR; 28	RCH; DNQ	NHA; 19	DOV; 43	MAR; 28	CLT; 43	TAL; 9	CAR; 21	PHO; 38	HOM; 40	ATL; DNQ			39th	1748	
2001	Eel River Racing	27	Pontiac	DAY	CAR	LVS	ATL	DAR	BRI	TEX	MAR	TAL	CAL	RCH	CLT	DOV	MCH	POC	SON	DAY; DNQ	CHI; DNQ	NHA; DNQ	POC	IND	GLN	MCH	BRI	DAR	RCH	DOV	KAN	CLT	MAR	TAL	PHO	CAR	HOM	ATL	NHA	NA	-	
2002	Chip Ganassi Racing	40	Dodge	DAY	CAR	LVS	ATL	DAR	BRI	TEX	MAR	TAL	CAL	RCH	CLT	DOV	POC	MCH	SON	DAY	CHI	NHA	POC	IND	GLN	MCH	BRI	DAR	RCH	NHA	DOV	KAN	TAL	CLT	MAR; 14	ATL	CAR	PHO	HOM	64th	121	
2003	Joe Gibbs Racing	80	Chevy	DAY	CAR	LVS	ATL	DAR	BRI	TEX	TAL	MAR	CAL	RCH	CLT	DOV	POC	MCH	SON	DAY; 26	CHI	NHA	POC	IND	GLN	MCH	BRI	DAR	RCH	NHA	DOV	TAL; DNQ	KAN	CLT	MAR	ATL	PHO	CAR	HOM	65th	85	
2004	Joe Gibbs Racing	80	Chevy	DAY	CAR	LVS	ATL	DAR	BRI	TEX	MAR	TAL	CAL	RCH	CLT	DOV	POC	MCH	SON	DAY	CHI; 31	NHA	POC	IND	GLN	MCH	BRI	CAL	RCH; 4	NHA	DOV	TAL	KAN	CLT	MAR	ATL	PHO			49th	407	
2004	Haas CNC Racing	0	Chevy																																			DAR; 10	HOM; 40	49th	407	
2005	Haas CNC Racing	0	Chevy	DAY; 18	CAL; 12	LVS; 16	ATL; 18	BRI; 37	MAR; 36	TEX; 22	PHO; 20	TAL; 36	DAR; 19	RCH; 37	CLT; 15	DOV; 18	POC; 35	MCH; 27	SON; 39	DAY; 20	CHI; 34	NHA; 21	POC; 9	IND; 11	GLN; 26	MCH; 37	BRI; 7	CAL; 27	RCH; 15	NHA; 36	DOV; 30	TAL; 32	KAN; 15	CLT; 35	MAR; 41	ATL; 13	TEX; 17	PHO; 31	HOM; 12	28th	3262	
2006	BAM Racing	49	Dodge	DAY	CAL	LVS	ATL	BRI	MAR	TEX	PHO	TAL	RCH	DAR	CLT	DOV	POC	MCH	SON	DAY	CHI	NHA	POC	IND	GLN	MCH	BRI	CAL	RCH	NHA	DOV	KAN	TAL; 26	CLT; 42	MAR; DNQ	ATL; 26	TEX; 23	PHO; 41	HOM; 39	48th	387	
2007	BAM Racing	49	Dodge	DAY; DNQ	CAL; DNQ	LVS; DNQ	ATL; 21	BRI; 17	MAR; 30	TEX; 41	PHO; DNQ	TAL; DNQ	RCH; DNQ	DAR; DNQ	CLT; DNQ	DOV; DNQ	POC; DNQ	MCH; DNQ	SON	NHA	DAY	CHI	IND	POC; DNQ	GLN	MCH	BRI	CAL	RCH	NHA	DOV	KAN	TAL	CLT	MAR	ATL	TEX	PHO	HOM	53rd	325	
2008	Michael Waltrip Racing	00	Toyota	DAY	CAL	LVS	ATL	BRI	MAR	TEX	PHO	TAL	RCH	DAR	CLT	DOV	POC	MCH	SON	NHA	DAY	CHI	IND	POC	GLN	MCH	BRI	CAL	RCH	NHA	DOV	KAN	TAL	CLT	MAR; 39	ATL	TEX	PHO	HOM	70th	46	
2009	Phoenix Racing	09	Dodge	DAY	CAL	LVS	ATL; 43	BRI	MAR	TEX; 42	PHO	TAL	RCH; 37	DAR	CLT; 43	DOV; 40	POC	MCH	SON	NHA	DAY	CHI; 40	IND	POC	GLN	MCH; 38	BRI	ATL; 41			DOV; 40	KAN; 41	CAL; 43				TEX; DNQ	PHO	HOM	44th	577	
2009	TRG Motorsports	71	Chevy																										RCH; 42	NHA				CLT; 24	MAR	TAL				44th	577	
2010	Tommy Baldwin Racing	36	Chevy	DAY; 42	CAL; 22	LVS; 39	ATL; 24	BRI; DNQ	MAR; 25	PHO; DNQ																														42nd	1050	
2010	Phoenix Racing	09	Chevy								TEX; 42	TAL; 10	RCH; 40	DAR; DNQ	DOV; 40	CLT; DNQ	POC	MCH	SON	NHA; DNQ																				42nd	1050	
2010	TRG Motorsports	71	Chevy																		DAY; 9																			42nd	1050	
2010	Braun Racing	32	Toyota																			CHI; 41	IND	POC	GLN	MCH; DNQ	BRI; DNQ													42nd	1050	
2010	Prism Motorsports	55	Toyota																									ATL; 42	RCH; QL^{†}	NHA; 41	DOV; 40	KAN; DNQ	CAL; DNQ	CLT; DNQ	MAR	TAL		PHO; 39		42nd	1050	
2010	Prism Motorsports	66	Toyota																																		TEX; 39		HOM; 43	42nd	1050	
2011	FAS Lane Racing	32	Ford	DAY	PHO	LVS	BRI	CAL	MAR	TEX	TAL	RCH	DAR	DOV; 25	CLT; 30	KAN	POC; 31	MCH; 32	SON	DAY	KEN; 34	NHA; 32	IND; 32	POC	GLN	MCH		ATL; 26	RCH; 36	CHI; 25	NHA; 31	DOV; 36	KAN; 28	CLT; 30	TAL	MAR	TEX; 34	PHO; 30		58th	0^{1}	
2011	Phoenix Racing	51	Chevy																								BRI; 29													58th	0^{1}	
2011	TRG Motorsports	71	Ford																																				HOM; 21	58th	0^{1}	
2012	FAS Lane Racing	32	Ford	DAY	PHO; 24	LVS	BRI																																	64th	0^{1}	
2012	Humphrey Smith Racing	19	Toyota					CAL; 40	MAR; DNQ	TEX; 40	KAN; 42	RCH; 42	TAL	DAR; DNQ	CLT; DNQ	DOV; 36	POC; 38	MCH; 39	SON	KEN; 42		NHA; DNQ	IND; 43	POC; 39	GLN	MCH	BRI; 43	ATL; DNQ	RCH; 40	CHI; 42	NHA	DOV; DNQ	TAL	CLT; 39	KAN; 36	MAR; DNQ	TEX; 41	PHO; 41	HOM; 43	64th	0^{1}	
2012	Phil Parsons Racing	98	Ford																		DAY; QL^{‡}																			64th	0^{1}	
2013	Humphrey Smith Racing	19	Toyota	DAY; DNQ	PHO; 42	LVS; DNQ	BRI; 43	CAL; 43	MAR; DNQ	TEX; 41	KAN; 41	RCH; 43	TAL	DAR; 43	CLT; DNQ	DOV; 41	POC	MCH; 41	SON	KEN; 41	DAY	NHA; 43	IND; DNQ	POC	GLN	MCH	BRI; DNQ		RCH; DNQ	CHI	NHA	DOV	KAN	CLT	TAL	MAR	TEX	PHO	HOM	69th	0^{1}	
2013	Phoenix Racing	51	Chevy																									ATL; 33												69th	0^{1}	
2014	BK Racing	93	Toyota	DAY	PHO	LVS	BRI	CAL	MAR	TEX	DAR	RCH	TAL	KAN	CLT	DOV	POC	MCH	SON	KEN; 41	DAY	NHA; 43	IND	POC	GLN	MCH	BRI													69th	0^{1}	
2014	Tommy Baldwin Racing	37	Chevy																									ATL; 43	RCH; 35	CHI; 43	NHA	DOV; 36	KAN; 43	CLT	TAL	MAR	TEX	PHO; 43	HOM	69th	0^{1}	
2015	Go Fas Racing	32	Ford	DAY	ATL; 31	LVS; DNQ	PHO; 33	CAL; 40	MAR; 34	TEX; 36	BRI; 31	RCH	TAL	KAN	CLT; DNQ	DOV; 35	POC	MCH; 40	SON	DAY	KEN	NHA	IND	POC	GLN	MCH														66th	0^{1}	
2015	Circle Sport	33	Chevy																								BRI; 37	DAR; 32	RCH	CHI	NHA	DOV	CLT	KAN	TAL	MAR	TEX	PHO	HOM	66th	0^{1}	
^{†} - Qualified for Terry Labonte · ^{‡} - Qualified for Michael McDowell

===== Daytona 500 =====
Year	Team	Manufacturer	Start	Finish
2000	A. J. Foyt Racing	Pontiac	35	33
2005	Haas CNC Racing	Chevrolet	35	18
2007	BAM Racing	Dodge	DNQ	
2010	Tommy Baldwin Racing	Chevrolet	28	42
2013	Humphrey Smith Racing	Toyota	DNQ	

==== Xfinity Series ====
NASCAR Xfinity Series results
Year	Team	No.	Make	1	2	3	4	5	6	7	8	9	10	11	12	13	14	15	16	17	18	19	20	21	22	23	24	25	26	27	28	29	30	31	32	33	34	35	NXSC	Pts	Ref
1998	Lone Star Motorsports	88	Chevy	DAY	CAR	LVS	NSV	DAR	BRI	TEX	HCY	TAL	NHA	NZH	CLT	DOV	RCH	PPR	GLN	MLW	MYB	CAL; 26	SBO																70th	231	
1998	Michael Waltrip Racing	21	Ford																					IRP; 7	MCH	BRI	DAR	RCH	DOV	CLT	GTY	CAR	ATL	HOM					70th	231	
1999	Team Amick	35	Chevy	DAY	CAR	LVS	ATL	DAR	TEX	NSV	BRI	TAL	CAL	NHA	RCH	NZH	CLT	DOV	SBO	GLN; 28	MLW; 24	MYB	PPR	GTY															84th	204	
1999	Michael Waltrip Racing	21	Chevy																						IRP; 43	MCH	BRI	DAR	RCH	DOV	CLT	CAR	MEM	PHO	HOM				84th	204	
2000	Emerald Performance Group	19	Chevy	DAY	CAR	LVS	ATL	DAR	BRI	TEX; 23	NSV	TAL	CAL	RCH	NHA	CLT	DOV	SBO	MYB	GLN	MLW	NZH	PPR	GTY	IRP	MCH	BRI	DAR	RCH	DOV	CLT	CAR	MEM	PHO	HOM				98th	94	
2001	Emerald Performance Group	19	Chevy	DAY; 40	CAR	LVS	ATL	DAR	BRI	TEX	NSH	TAL	CAL	RCH	NHA	NZH	CLT	DOV	KEN	MLW	GLN	CHI	GTY	PPR	IRP	MCH	BRI	DAR	RCH	DOV	KAN	CLT	MEM	PHO	CAR	HOM			142nd	43	
2003	Joe Gibbs Racing	20	Pontiac	DAY; 33						TAL; 5											DAY; 39																		10th	3932	
2003	Joe Gibbs Racing	20	Chevy		CAR; 6	LVS; 3	DAR; 32	BRI; 5	TEX; 22		NSH; 4	CAL; 17	RCH; 28	GTY; 12*	NZH; 3	CLT; 5	DOV; 9	NSH; 33	KEN; 31	MLW; 21		CHI; 10	NHA; 33	PPR; 16	IRP; 10	MCH; 16	BRI; 30	DAR; 12	RCH; 27	DOV; 5	KAN; 31	CLT; 3	MEM; 8	ATL; 21	PHO; 20	CAR; 15	HOM; 7		10th	3932	
2004	Joe Gibbs Racing	20	Chevy	DAY; 30	CAR; 13	**LVS**; 12	DAR; 10	BRI; 17	TEX; 18	NSH; 8	TAL; 39	CAL; 17	GTY; 17	RCH; 8	NZH; 33	CLT; 16	DOV; 19	NSH; 4	KEN; 3	MLW; 6	**DAY**; 5	CHI; 33	NHA; 32	PPR; 6	IRP; 7	MCH; 10	BRI; 21	CAL; 16	RCH; 6	DOV; 18	KAN; 19	CLT; 1	MEM; 5	**ATL**; 27	PHO; 12	DAR; 3	HOM; 27		5th	4115	
2005	SKI Motorsports	30	Chevy	DAY	CAL	MXC	LVS	ATL	NSH	BRI	TEX	PHO	TAL	DAR	RCH	CLT	DOV	NSH	KEN	MLW	DAY; 33	CHI	NHA	PPR	GTY	IRP	GLN	MCH	BRI	CAL	RCH	DOV	KAN	CLT	MEM	TEX	PHO	HOM	130th	64	
2006	Frank Cicci Racing	34	Chevy	DAY	CAL	MXC	LVS	ATL	BRI; 36	TEX; 12	NSH; 26	PHO; 38	TAL	RCH																									62nd	596	
2006	SKI Motorsports	30	Chevy												DAR; 31	CLT	DOV	NSH	KEN	MLW	DAY	CHI	NHA	MAR	GTY; 36	IRP	GLN	MCH	BRI	CAL; 30	RCH	DOV	KAN; 27	CLT	MEM	TEX	PHO	HOM	62nd	596	
2007	Fitz Motorsports	22	Dodge	DAY	CAL	MXC	LVS	ATL	BRI; 10	NSH; 10	TEX	PHO; 15	TAL; 14	RCH; 33	DAR; 18		DOV; 9	NSH; 16	KEN; 9	MLW; 25	NHA; 13	DAY; 17	CHI	GTY; 33		CGV	GLN	MCH	BRI; 13	CAL	RCH; 5	DOV; 4	KAN; 31	CLT; 29	MEM; 2	TEX; 43	PHO; 32	HOM; 23	21st	2608	
2007	Fitz Motorsports	44	Dodge													CLT; 39																							21st	2608	
2007	Braun Racing	10	Toyota																						IRP; 9														21st	2608	
2008	Fitz Motorsports	22	Dodge	DAY; 17	CAL; 13	LVS; 26	ATL; 7	BRI; 5	NSH; 11																														5th	4518	
2008	Phoenix Racing	1	Chevy							TEX; 24	PHO; 6	MXC; 9	TAL; 7	RCH; 8	DAR; 14	CLT; 15	DOV; 18	NSH; 12	KEN; 8	MLW; 7	NHA; 8	DAY; 10	CHI; 11	GTY; 31	IRP; 3	CGV; 19	GLN; 13	MCH; 6	BRI; 13	CAL; 12	RCH; 11	DOV; 2	KAN; 12	CLT; 19	MEM; 7	TEX; 27	PHO; 8	HOM; 14	5th	4518	
2009	Phoenix Racing	1	Chevy	DAY; 28	CAL; 13	LVS; 22	BRI; 35	TEX; 7	NSH; 8	PHO; 9	TAL; 41	RCH; 33	DAR; 7	CLT; 1	DOV; 14	NSH; 4	KEN; 28	MLW; 7	NHA; 4	DAY; 29	CHI; 9	GTY; 4	IRP; 33	IOW; 14														HOM; 16	5th	4075	
2009	MSRP Motorsports	90	Chevy																						GLN; 43														5th	4075	
2009	NEMCO Motorsports	87	Chevy																							MCH; 27	BRI; 15	CGV; 34	ATL; 34										5th	4075	
2009	Key Motorsports	40	Chevy																											RCH; 16		KAN; 21							5th	4075	
2009	CJM Racing	11	Toyota																												DOV; 2			CLT; 2	MEM; 4*	TEX; 10	PHO; 8		5th	4075	
2009	MacDonald Motorsports	81	Dodge																														CAL; 13						5th	4075	
2010	Key Motorsports	40	Chevy	DAY; 40	CAL; 27	LVS; 27	BRI; 8	NSH; 27	PHO; 38	TEX; 20	TAL	RCH; 13	DAR; 32	DOV; 22	CLT; 12			ROA; 31	NHA; 34	DAY; 19	CHI; 18	GTY; 19	IRP; 13	IOW; 17	GLN; 14	MCH; 19	BRI; 17	CGV; 15	ATL; 15	RCH; 40	DOV; 18	KAN; 19	CAL; 9	CLT; 31		TEX; 21	PHO; 12	HOM; 31	15th	3450	
2010	Kevin Harvick Incorporated	33	Chevy													NSH; 5	KEN; 24																		GTY; 2				15th	3450	
2011	TriStar Motorsports	19	Chevy	DAY; 13	PHO; 20	LVS; 17	BRI; 26	CAL; 19	TEX; 19	TAL; 35	NSH; 31	RCH; 18	DAR; 30		IOW; 18	CLT; 18	CHI; 22	MCH; 23	ROA; 15	DAY; 20	KEN; 24	NHA; 14	NSH; 24	IRP; 11	IOW; 18	GLN; 22	CGV; 15	BRI; 18	ATL; 15	RCH; 12	CHI; 15	DOV; 9	KAN; 22	CLT; 20	TEX; 23	PHO; 31	HOM; 17		12th	827	
2011	TriStar Motorsports	14	Chevy											DOV; 15																									12th	827	
2012	TriStar Motorsports	44	Toyota	DAY; 39	PHO; 16	LVS; 15	BRI; 15	CAL; 17	TEX; 16	RCH; 17	TAL; 18	DAR; 15	IOW; 15	CLT; 12	DOV; 33	MCH; 13	ROA; 13	KEN; 17	DAY; 8	NHA; 13	CHI; 12	IND; 11		GLN; 14	CGV; 13	BRI; 13	ATL; 22	RCH; 15	CHI; 13	KEN; 18									8th	902	
2012	TriStar Motorsports	10	Toyota																				IOW; 20											TEX; 18		HOM; 19			8th	902	
2012	TriStar Motorsports	19	Toyota																												DOV; 11	CLT; 36	KAN; 13		PHO; 13				8th	902	
2013	TriStar Motorsports	19	Toyota	DAY; 23	PHO; 14	LVS; 17	BRI; 13	CAL; 18	TEX; 20	RCH; 13	TAL; 14	DAR; 19	CLT; 19	DOV; 18	IOW; 10	MCH; 21	ROA; 33	KEN; 19	DAY; 14	NHA; 17	CHI; 19	IND; 36	IOW; 18	GLN; 27	MOH; 17	BRI; 17	ATL; 22	RCH; 18	CHI; 23	KEN; 26	DOV; 10	KAN; 13	CLT; 15	TEX; 23	PHO; 17				13th	814	
2013	TriStar Motorsports	10	Toyota																																	HOM; 37			13th	814	
2014	TriStar Motorsports	19	Toyota	DAY; 20	PHO; 17	LVS; 14	BRI; 26	CAL; 18	TEX; 32	DAR; 16	RCH; 16	TAL; 12	IOW; 31	CLT; 20	DOV; 22	MCH; 18	ROA; 10	KEN; 34	DAY; 38	NHA; 32	CHI; 19	IND; 22	IOW; 16	GLN; 14	MOH; 11		ATL; 17		CHI; 20	KEN; 24	DOV; 29	KAN; 14	CLT; 18	TEX; 18	PHO; 16	HOM; 23			14th	779	
2014	TriStar Motorsports	10	Toyota																							BRI; 17		RCH; 20											14th	779	
2015	TriStar Motorsports	19	Toyota	DAY	ATL; 25	LVS; 39	PHO; 20	CAL; 26	TEX; 24	BRI; 20	RCH; 23	TAL; 34	IOW	CLT	DOV	MCH	CHI	DAY	KEN	NHA	IND	IOW	GLN	MOH	BRI	ROA	DAR	RCH	CHI	KEN	DOV	CLT	KAN						31st	166	
2015	TriStar Motorsports	14	Toyota																															TEX; 36	PHO; 35	HOM; 37			31st	166	
2016	TriStar Motorsports	10	Toyota	DAY	ATL	LVS	PHO	CAL	TEX	BRI	RCH	TAL	DOV	CLT	POC	MCH	IOW	DAY	KEN	NHA	IND	IOW; 39	GLN							KEN; 40	DOV	CLT	KAN	TEX	PHO	HOM			119th	0^{1}	
2016	TriStar Motorsports	14	Toyota																					MOH; 26	BRI	ROA	DAR	RCH	CHI										119th	0^{1}	

==== Camping World Truck Series ====
NASCAR Camping World Truck Series results
Year	Team	No.	Make	1	2	3	4	5	6	7	8	9	10	11	12	13	14	15	16	17	18	19	20	21	22	23	24	25	26	27	NCWTC	Pts	Ref
1995	Ultra Motorsports	08	Ford	PHO; 14	TUS; 19	SGS	MMR; 3	POR; 5	EVG; 5	I70; 13	LVL; 7																				8th	2636	
1995	Ultra Motorsports	2	Ford									BRI; 14	MLW; 13	CNS; 27	HPT; 9	IRP; 7	FLM; 6	RCH; 9	MAR; 7	NWS; 1	SON; 8	MMR; 2	PHO; 12								8th	2636	
1996	Ultra Motorsports	2	Ford	HOM; 27	PHO; 28	POR; 2	EVG; 1*	TUS; 19	CNS; 23	HPT; 4	BRI; 21	NZH; 11	**MLW**; 5	**LVL**; 13	I70; 1	IRP; 3	FLM; 2	GLN; 22	NSV; 10	RCH; 20	NHA; 3	MAR; 16	NWS; 12	SON; 7	MMR; 4	PHO; 14	LVS; 12				5th	3190	
1997	Ultra Motorsports	2	Ford	WDW; 25	TUS; 5	HOM; 2	PHO; 3	POR; 6	EVG; 7	I70; 8	NHA; 17	**TEX**; 5*	BRI; 30	**NZH**; 3	MLW; 23	LVL; 13	CNS; 2	HPT; 17	IRP; 19	FLM; 10	**NSV**; 9	GLN; 2	RCH; 7	MAR; 3	SON; 22	**MMR**; 3	**CAL**; 1*	**PHO**; 10	LVS; 5*		4th	3611	
1998	Ultra Motorsports	2	Ford	WDW; 12	HOM; 14	PHO; 33	POR; 28	EVG; 30	I70; 3	GLN; 7	TEX; 37	BRI; 25	MLW; 1*	**NZH**; 25	CAL; 9	**PPR**; 6	IRP; 27	NHA; 15	FLM; 12	**NSV**; 12*	HPT; 20	LVL; 2*	RCH; 27	MEM; 23	GTY; 17	MAR; 13	SON; 2	MMR; 19*	**PHO**; 1*	LVS; 6*	10th	3216	
1999	Roush Racing	99	Ford	HOM; 28	PHO; 10	EVG; 8	MMR; 12	**MAR**; 6	MEM; 12	**PPR**; 15	I70; 9	BRI; 28	TEX; 6	PIR; 2	GLN; 19	MLW; 5	NSV; 15	NZH; 2	MCH; 22	NHA; 6	IRP; 5	GTY; 8	HPT; 1	RCH; 13	LVS; 30	LVL; 11	TEX; 26	CAL; 5			9th	3294	
2001	Xpress Motorsports	16	Chevy	DAY	HOM	MMR	MAR	GTY	DAR	PPR	DOV	TEX	MEM	MLW	KAN	KEN	NHA	IRP	NSH	CIC	NZH	RCH	SBO; 9	TEX	LVS	PHO	CAL				86th	138	
2002	Xpress Motorsports	16	Chevy	DAY; 33	DAR; 3	MAR; 2	**GTY**; 3	PPR; 1	DOV; 5	TEX; 12	MEM; 18	MLW; 8	KAN; 1	KEN; 1*	NHA; 10	MCH; 4	IRP; 15	**NSH**; 1	RCH; 3	**TEX**; 9	SBO; 1	LVS; 2*	CAL; 9	PHO; 10	**HOM**; 5						1st	3359	
2005	Xpress Motorsports	16	Chevy	DAY	CAL; QL^{†}	ATL	MAR	GTY	MFD	CLT	DOV	TEX	MCH	MLW	KAN	KEN	MEM	IRP	NSH						ATL; 36	TEX; 22	PHO; 10	HOM; 4			41st	581	
2005	MRD Motorsports	06	Chevy																	BRI; 11	RCH; DNQ	NHA	LVS	MAR							41st	581	
2006	Xpress Motorsports	16	Chevy	DAY; 22	CAL; 7	ATL; 7	MAR; 5	GTY; 9	CLT; 33	MFD; 8	DOV; 4	TEX; 10	MCH; 14	MLW; 2	KAN; 31	KEN; 15	MEM; 5	IRP; 5	NSH; 30	BRI; 8	NHA; 16	LVS; 3	TAL; 25	MAR; 22	ATL; 1*	TEX; 27	PHO; 11	HOM; 30			11th	3151	
2007	Key Motorsports	40	Chevy	DAY; 23	CAL; 10	ATL; 25	MAR; 35	KAN																							17th	2186	
2007	Xpress Motorsports	16	Ford						CLT; 6	MFD																					17th	2186	
2007	Bobby Hamilton Racing	4	Dodge								DOV; 5	TEX	MCH	MLW; 7	MEM	KEN; 9	IRP; 11	NSH; 24	BRI; 7	GTY; 25	NHA; 5	LVS	TAL; 34	MAR; 6	ATL	TEX; 4	PHO; 3*	HOM; 32			17th	2186	
2008	TRG Motorsports	71	Chevy	DAY; 33																											50th	352	
2008	SS-Green Light Racing	07	Chevy		CAL; 24	ATL	MAR	KAN	CLT	MFD	DOV	TEX	MCH																		50th	352	
2008	Billy Ballew Motorsports	51	Toyota											MLW; 12	MEM	KEN	IRP	NSH	BRI	GTY	NHA	LVS	TAL	MAR	ATL	TEX					50th	352	
2008	Key Motorsports	40	Chevy																								PHO; 31	HOM			50th	352	
2009	Key Motorsports	40	Chevy	DAY; 33	CAL; 18	ATL; 8	MAR; 15	KAN	CLT; 27	DOV	TEX	MCH	MLW	MEM	KEN	IRP	NSH	BRI	CHI	IOW	GTY	NHA	LVS	MAR	TAL	TEX					38th	731	
2009	HT Motorsports	25	Toyota																								PHO; 7	HOM; 31			38th	731	
2016	Contreras Motorsports	71	Chevy	DAY	ATL	MAR; 30	KAN; 17	DOV	CLT																						46th	26	
2016	MB Motorsports	63	Chevy							TEX; 28	IOW	GTW	KEN	ELD	POC	BRI	MCH	MSP	CHI	NHA	LVS	TAL	MAR	TEX	PHO	HOM					46th	26	
^{†} - Qualified for Jack Sprague

^{*} Season still in progress
^{1} Ineligible for series points

=== International Race of Champions ===
(key) (Bold – Pole position. * – Most laps led.)

International Race of Champions results
Season	Make	1	2	3	4	Pos.	Points	Ref
2003	Pontiac	DAY; 9	TAL; 2	CHI; 1	IND; 10	4th	54	

Sporting positions
Preceded by Jack Sprague	NASCAR Craftsman Truck Series Champion; 2002	Succeeded by Travis Kvapil
