= 2009 Kobalt Tools 500 =

Race details
- Race 4 of 36 in the 2009 NASCAR Sprint Cup Series season
- 2009 Kobalt Tools 500 program cover
- Date: March 8, 2009
- Official name: Kobalt Tools 500
- Location: Atlanta Motor Speedway, Hampton, Georgia
- Course: Permanent racing facility
- Course length: 1.54 miles (2.48 km)
- Distance: 330 laps, 508.2 mi (817.868 km)
- Scheduled distance: 325 laps, 500.5 mi (805.476 km)
- Weather: Temperatures up to 73.9 °F (23.3 °C); wind speeds up to 15 miles per hour (24 km/h)
- Average speed: 127.573 miles per hour (205.309 km/h)
- Attendance: 94,400

Pole position
Driver	Mark Martin	Hendrick Motorsports
- Time: 29.640

Most laps led
Driver	Kurt Busch	Penske Racing
- Laps: 234

Winner
No. 2	Kurt Busch	Penske Racing

Television in the United States
- Network: Fox Broadcasting Company
- Announcers: Mike Joy, Darrell Waltrip, Larry McReynolds
- Nielsen ratings: 5.5/12 (Final); 4.7/10 (Overnight); 8,877,000 million

The 2009 Kobalt Tools 500 was the fourth stock car race of the 2009 NASCAR Sprint Cup Series. It was held on March 8, 2009, in Hampton, Georgia, at Atlanta Motor Speedway, before a crowd of 94,400 attendees. The circuit is an intermediate track that holds NASCAR races. The 325-lap race was won by Penske Racing Championship's Kurt Busch from a second position start. Jeff Gordon of Hendrick Motorsports took second, with Roush Fenway Racing driver Carl Edwards in third.

Mark Martin won his first pole position since the 2001 season by posting the fastest lap in qualifying, and he held the lead for the first six laps, until Busch overtook him on the seventh lap. He lost it after the first pit stop cycle to Ryan Newman but he passed him on the 18th lap to retake the position. After that, Busch ceded the lead to Jimmie Johnson after a refuelling problem during a pit stop, but he returned to the lead on lap 103. At the green–white–checker restart on lap 330, Edwards was in the first position, but he was passed by Kurt Busch on the outside lane soon after, and the latter held off Gordon for the remainder of the race to win. There were eleven cautions and thirteen lead changes amongst eight different drivers during the course of the event.

The victory was Busch's first of the season, his second at Atlanta Motor Speedway, and the 19th of his career, since he debuted in the 2000 season. The result advanced him from seventh to third in the Drivers' Championship; 46 points behind Gordon (whose second-place finish enabled him to increase his points advantage over Clint Bowyer). In the Manufacturers' Championship, Chevrolet lowered Ford's lead to two points, while Toyota and Dodge were tied for third with 33 races left in the season. The race had a television audience of 8,877,000 million.

== Background ==
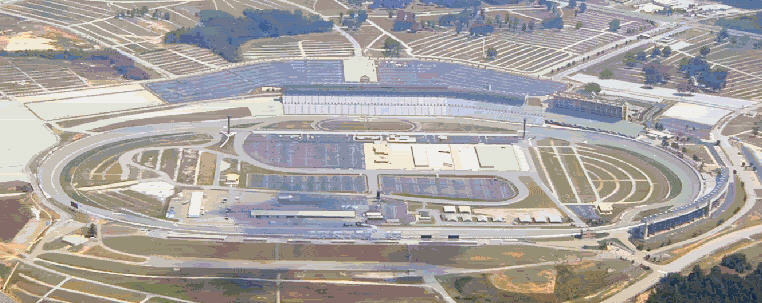
An aerial view of Atlanta Motor Speedway

The Kobalt Tools 500 was the fourth out of thirty-six scheduled stock car races of the 2009 NASCAR Sprint Cup Series. It was held on March 8, 2009, in Hampton, Georgia, at Atlanta Motor Speedway; an intermediate track that holds NASCAR races. The standard track at Atlanta Motor Speedway is a 1.54 mi (2.48 km) four-turn quad-oval. The track's turns are banked at twenty-four degrees, while the front stretch, the location of the finish line, and the back stretch are banked at five degrees.

Before the race, Hendrick Motorsports' Jeff Gordon led the Drivers' Championship with 459 points, ahead of Clint Bowyer in second, and Matt Kenseth third. Greg Biffle and David Reutimann were fourth and fifth, and Kyle Busch, Kurt Busch, Tony Stewart, Carl Edwards, Bobby Labonte, Kevin Harvick, and Michael Waltrip rounded out the top twelve. In the Manufacturers' Championship, Ford led with 22 points; Chevrolet were in second place with 18 points. Toyota placed third with 16 points, and Dodge were fourth with ten points. Kyle Busch was the race's defending champion from the 2008 event.

Starting from the Atlanta round, NASCAR established a regulation that determines how long the restart zone is on each track. This added to a new rule devised by NASCAR at the start of the season, when they created a zone from which the race leader was required to commence the race for better consistency. NASCAR's vice-president of competition Robin Pemberton explained series officials would double the figure of the pit road speed limit, and then establish it as the distance in feet of the restart area, "It will be twice the pit-road speed. It's a means to get variable lengths in there for the race track itself. It's something the garage area asked us to do. Is it perfect; maybe, maybe not. But, it's a start."

== Practice and qualifying ==
Three practice sessions were held before the Sunday race; one on Friday and two on Saturday. The first session lasted 90 minutes, and the second, scheduled for 45 minutes, was shortened to 20 minutes because of fog delaying qualifying for the Camping World Truck Series round. The final session ran for an hour. In the first practice session, Mark Martin was fastest with a 30.180 seconds lap, ahead of Harvick in second, and Brian Vickers in third. David Stremme was fourth-fastest, Juan Pablo Montoya placed fifth, and Kasey Kahne sixth. Kurt Busch, Edwards, Marcos Ambrose, and A. J. Allmendinger rounded out the session's top ten competitors.

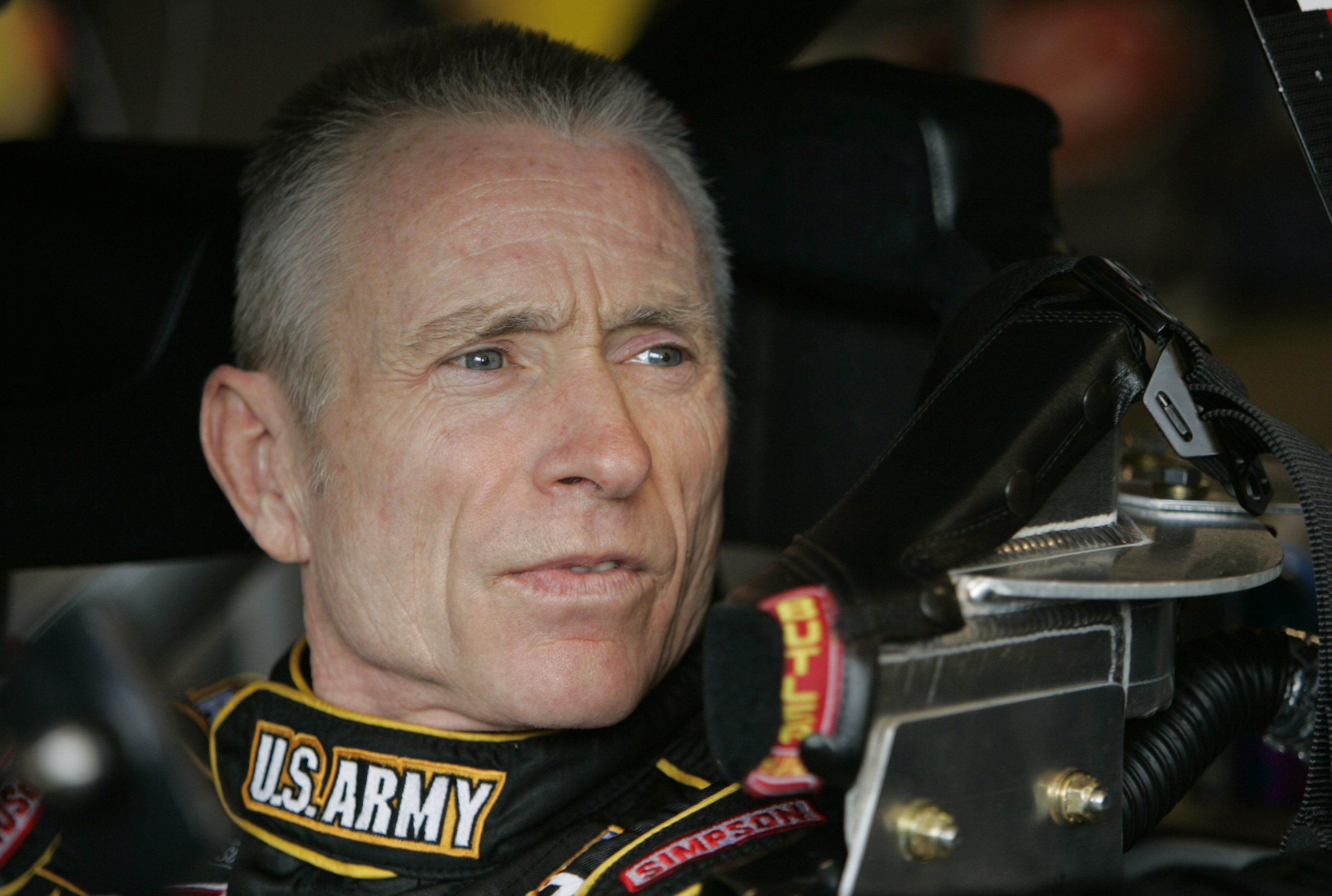
Mark Martin (pictured in 2007) had the 42nd pole position of his career.

Forty-seven drivers attempted to qualify on Friday evening, according to NASCAR's qualifying procedure forty-three were allowed to race. Each driver ran two laps, with the starting order determined by the competitor's fastest times. Martin took his first pole position since the 2001 Pontiac Excitement 400, and the 42nd of his career, with a time of 29.640 seconds. He was joined on the grid's front row by Kurt Busch whose best lap was 0.108 seconds behind because of his slower corner entry speed. Jamie McMurray was the highest-placed Ford driver in third. Montoya qualified fourth after a minor loss of car control leaving turn four, Biffle took fifth, and Denny Hamlin sixth. Jimmie Johnson, Joe Nemechek (the fastest driver to qualify on merit outside the top 35), Kyle Busch, and Harvick completed the top ten starters. The four drivers who did not qualify were Todd Bodine, Scott Riggs, Jeremy Mayfield, and Geoff Bodine. Tony Raines withdrew prior to qualifying. Martin said afterward, "I feel like a rookie, I really, really do. I'm still shaking. I thought I ran out of talent in turn four. There was no possible way to hold my foot on the floor and not hit the wall, back end first, in turn four. But that was really fun. I live to scare myself like that."

On Saturday morning Biffle was the fastest driver in the second practice session with a time of 30.030 seconds. Edwards was second, and Stremme in third. Hamlin was fourth-fastest, Kenseth came fifth, and Jeff Gordon sixth. Kyle Busch, Montoya, David Ragan, and Johnson followed in positions seven through ten. Later that day, Edwards paced the final practice session with a lap of 30.880 seconds, with Kahne three-hundredths of a second behind in second. Hamlin was third-fastest; Kurt Busch came fourth, McMurray placed fifth, and Biffle was sixth. Stremme was seventh-fastest, Jeff Gordon eighth, Martin ninth, and Aric Almirola completed the top ten ahead of the race. During practice, Martin Truex Jr. was in pain due to a small kidney stone. He was transported directly to the infield medical centre to undergo an examination, and later to Spalding Regional Medical Center in Griffin, Georgia for observation and further treatment. Because of NASCAR's drug regulations, he elected to forgo medications while passing the stone so that he could compete in the race.

=== Qualifying results ===
Grid	Car	Driver	Team	Manufacturer	Time	Speed
1	5	Mark Martin	Hendrick Motorsports	Chevrolet	29.640	187.044
2	2	Kurt Busch	Penske Championship Racing	Dodge	29.748	186.365
3	26	Jamie McMurray	Roush Fenway Racing	Ford	29.757	186.309
4	42	Juan Pablo Montoya	Earnhardt Ganassi Racing	Chevrolet	29.773	186.209
5	16	Greg Biffle	Roush Fenway Racing	Ford	29.777	186.184
6	11	Denny Hamlin	Joe Gibbs Racing	Toyota	29.780	186.165
7	48	Jimmie Johnson	Hendrick Motorsports	Chevrolet	29.798	186.053
8	87	Joe Nemechek	NEMCO Motorsports	Toyota	29.819	185.922
9	18	Kyle Busch	Joe Gibbs Racing	Toyota	29.824	185.891
10	29	Kevin Harvick	Richard Childress Racing	Chevrolet	29.833	185.835
11	14	Tony Stewart	Stewart–Haas Racing	Chevrolet	29.848	185.741
12	39	Ryan Newman	Stewart–Haas Racing	Chevrolet	29.874	185.579
13	9	Kasey Kahne	Richard Petty Motorsports	Dodge	29.898	185.430
14	19	Elliott Sadler	Richard Petty Motorsports	Dodge	29.913	185.337
15	31	Jeff Burton	Richard Childress Racing	Chevrolet	29.922	185.282
16	24	Jeff Gordon	Hendrick Motorsports	Chevrolet	29.924	185.269
17	83	Brian Vickers	Red Bull Racing Team	Toyota	29.976	184.948
18	00	David Reutimann	Michael Waltrip Racing	Toyota	29.989	184.868
19	7	Robby Gordon	Robby Gordon Motorsports	Toyota	30.023	184.658
20	88	Dale Earnhardt Jr.	Hendrick Motorsports	Chevrolet	30.049	184.499
21	33	Clint Bowyer	Richard Childress Racing	Chevrolet	30.049	184.499
22	28	Travis Kvapil	Yates Racing	Ford	30.088	184.260
23	1	Martin Truex Jr.	Earnhardt Ganassi Racing	Chevrolet	30.113	184.107
24	55	Michael Waltrip	Michael Waltrip Racing	Toyota	30.129	184.009
25	7	Casey Mears	Richard Childress Racing	Chevrolet	30.130	184.003
26	82	Scott Speed	Red Bull Racing Team	Toyota	30.134	183.978
27	66	Dave Blaney	Prism Motorsports	Toyota	30.139	183.948
28	12	David Stremme	Penske Championship Racing	Dodge	30.143	183.923
29	99	Carl Edwards	Roush Fenway Racing	Ford	30.150	183.881
30	17	Matt Kenseth	Roush Fenway Racing	Ford	30.164	183.795
31	71	David Gilliland	TRG Motorsports	Chevrolet	30.169	183.765
32	43	Reed Sorenson	Richard Petty Motorsports	Dodge	30.171	183.753
33	98	Paul Menard	Yates Racing	Ford	30.248	183.285
34	47	Marcos Ambrose	JTG Daugherty Racing	Toyota	30.250	183.273
35	21	Bill Elliott	Wood Brothers Racing	Ford	30.251	183.267
36	77	Sam Hornish Jr.	Penske Championship Racing	Dodge	30.254	183.249
37	8	Aric Almirola	Earnhardt Ganassi Racing	Chevrolet	30.306	182.934
38	44	A. J. Allmendinger	Richard Petty Motorsports	Dodge	30.308	182.922
39	6	David Ragan	Roush Fenway Racing	Ford	30.319	182.856^{1}
40	96	Bobby Labonte	Hall of Fame Racing	Ford	30.331	182.753
41	34	John Andretti	Front Row Motorsports	Chevrolet	30.358	182.621
42	20	Joey Logano	Joe Gibbs Racing	Toyota	30.472	181.938
43	09	Mike Bliss	Phoenix Racing	Dodge	30.354	182.645
Failed to qualify
44	35	Todd Bodine	Germain Racing	Toyota	30.443	182.111
45	36	Scott Riggs	Tommy Baldwin Racing	Toyota	30.584	181.271
46	41	Jeremy Mayfield	Mayfield Motorsports	Toyota	30.811	179.936
47	64	Geoff Bodine	Gunselman Motorsports	Toyota	31.018	178.735
^{1} Moved to the back of the grid for changing engines (#6)

== Race ==
Live television coverage of the event, the 100th in NASCAR Cup Series competition at Atlanta Motor Speedway, commenced in the United States on Fox at 1:30 p.m. Eastern Standard Time (UTC−04:00). Around the start of the race, weather conditions were clear and warm with the air temperature at 73.3 °F (22.9 °C). Lead pastor Chris Patton of Southside Church in Peachtree City, Georgia began pre-race ceremonies with an invocation. Country music artist and songwriter Richie McDonald performed the national anthem, and the command for drivers to start their engines was given by Kelly Brown, vice president of merchandising for Lowe's. During the pace laps, Ragan dropped to the rear of the field because of an engine change. Poor track grip caused drivers to battle for control of their cars during the event.

The race commenced at 2:18 local time. Martin maintained the first position on the entry to turn one. The first caution was waved on the next lap as Reed Sorenson made contact with the wall lining the track at turn one after a car component failure. He drove to his garage for repairs. Martin held the lead at the lap six restart, followed by Kurt Busch and McMurray. On the following lap, Kurt Busch passed below Martin to take the lead. Bobby Labonte triggered the second caution five laps later, when he spun in turn 4, but avoided damage to his car. During the caution, some drivers including Kurt Busch, made pit stops for tires and car adjustments. Nemechek led for one lap before making his pit stop on the 14th lap. Ryan Newman then took the lead, and held it at the restart on lap 16. Kurt Busch overtook Martin for second place on the next lap. On the 17th lap, Kurt Busch steered right to the outside lane and passed Newman to reclaim the first position. Hamlin got ahead of Newman for second two laps later. Martin attempted to do the same for third, but he was unsuccessful. After starting 16th, Jeff Gordon advanced to ninth by the 23rd lap. Similarly, Edwards was in seventh by lap 31 after beginning from 29th place. Eight laps later, Dale Earnhardt Jr. lost tenth to Kyle Busch.

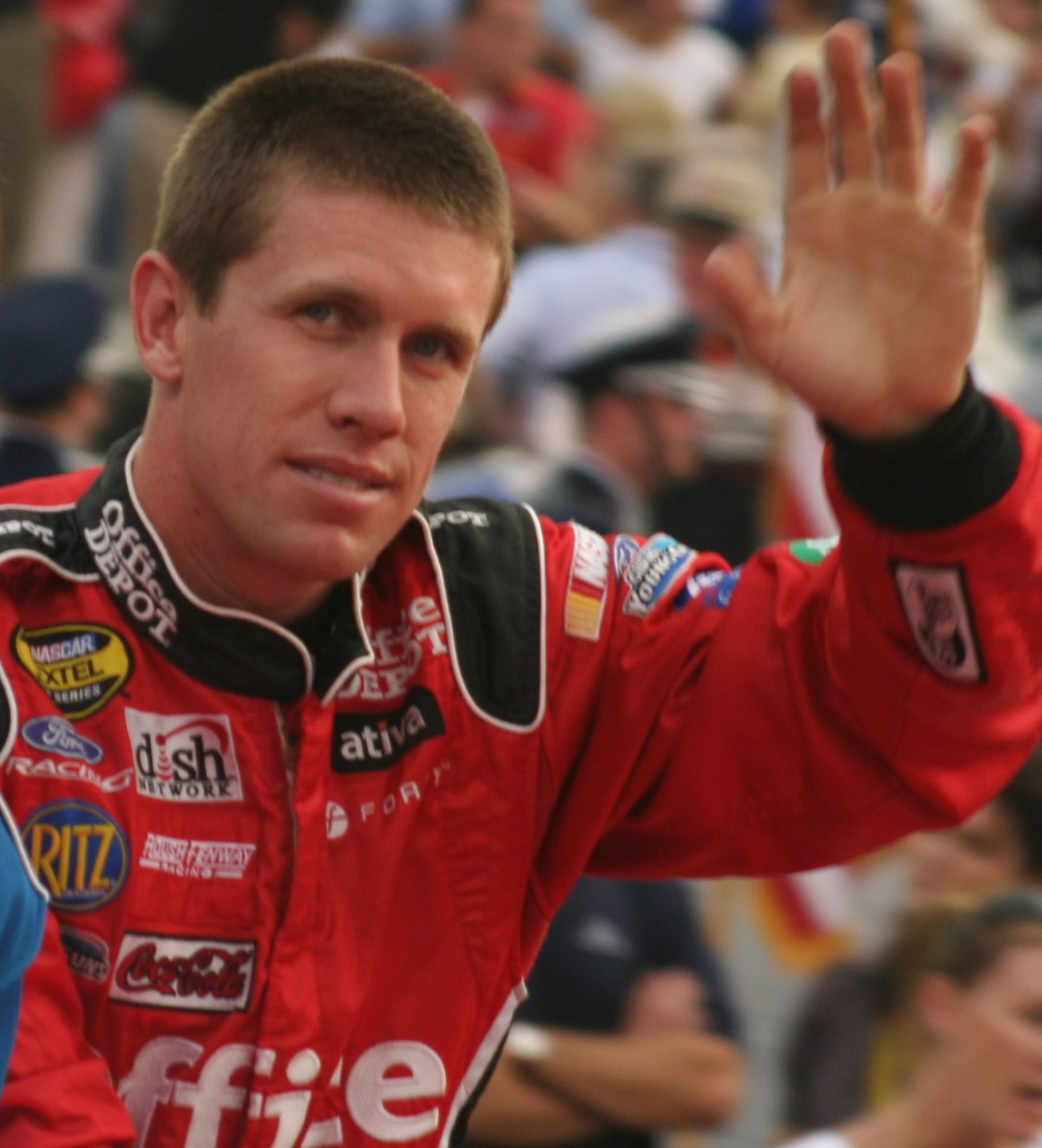
Carl Edwards (pictured in 2007) finished in third after losing his chance of the victory at the green–white–checker restart.

Green flag pit stops for tires, fuel, and car adjustments began on lap 53. Fourteen laps later, a tire escaped from Ambrose's pit crew, and rested approximately 70 ft (21 m) in the infield. Ambrose's gas man and firefighter Jimmy Watts ran across the grass, and was within 25 yd (23 m) of the track when he retrieved the tire. Because Watts ventured into the infield, considered by NASCAR to be part of the track, and with cars leaving turn four at near to 200 mph (320 km/h), series officials waved the third caution. NASCAR officials escorted Watts from pit road, and he was suspended for the remainder of the event. Kurt Busch made a second pit stop after a refueling problem at a prior stop. The caution meant 15 drivers were on the lead lap, and Johnson led at the lap-74 restart. Two laps later, Jeff Gordon's clutch developed a problem. On lap 78, Edwards overtook Hamlin for second. Edwards got past Johnson on the outside lane for the lead on the 80th lap. Three laps later, Johnson was passed by Hamlin on the inside line while in slower traffic for the third position. On the 103rd lap, Kurt Busch passed Edwards around the outside to claim the first position. Labonte spun on the frontstretch on the same lap, necessitating the fourth caution. Under caution, lapped drivers made pit stops for adjustments to their cars.

At the lap 112 restart, Kurt Busch kept the lead over Edwards and Bowyer. Edwards drove on the inside lane, while Kurt Busch ran on the outside line. As some drivers began another phase of green flag pit stops on the 155th lap, the fifth caution came out when fluid was found in turn two. Kurt Busch again held the lead at the lap 162 restart, followed by Bowyer. Two laps later, Bowyer fell to fifth when Jeff Gordon, Johnson, and Edwards got past him. He lost a further position to Martin on lap 166. Jeff Gordon caught and overtook Kurt Busch for first on the 172nd lap, but he did not hold it, as Kurt Busch re-passed him before crossing the start-finish line. On lap 183, Ambrose's car billowed smoke, and he stopped on the apron below the track. The sixth caution was issued two laps later as debris was located on the track. The leaders elected to make pit stops for tires and car adjustments during the caution. Truex led lap 190 but Kurt Busch was first at the lap 192 restart. Ragan made contact with his teammate Biffle on the 196th lap, causing him to go sideways into the wall, and prompting Biffle to regain control of his car. Six laps later, Kurt Busch glanced the wall, and Jeff Gordon passed him for the lead, but lost it to Busch before the conclusion of the lap.

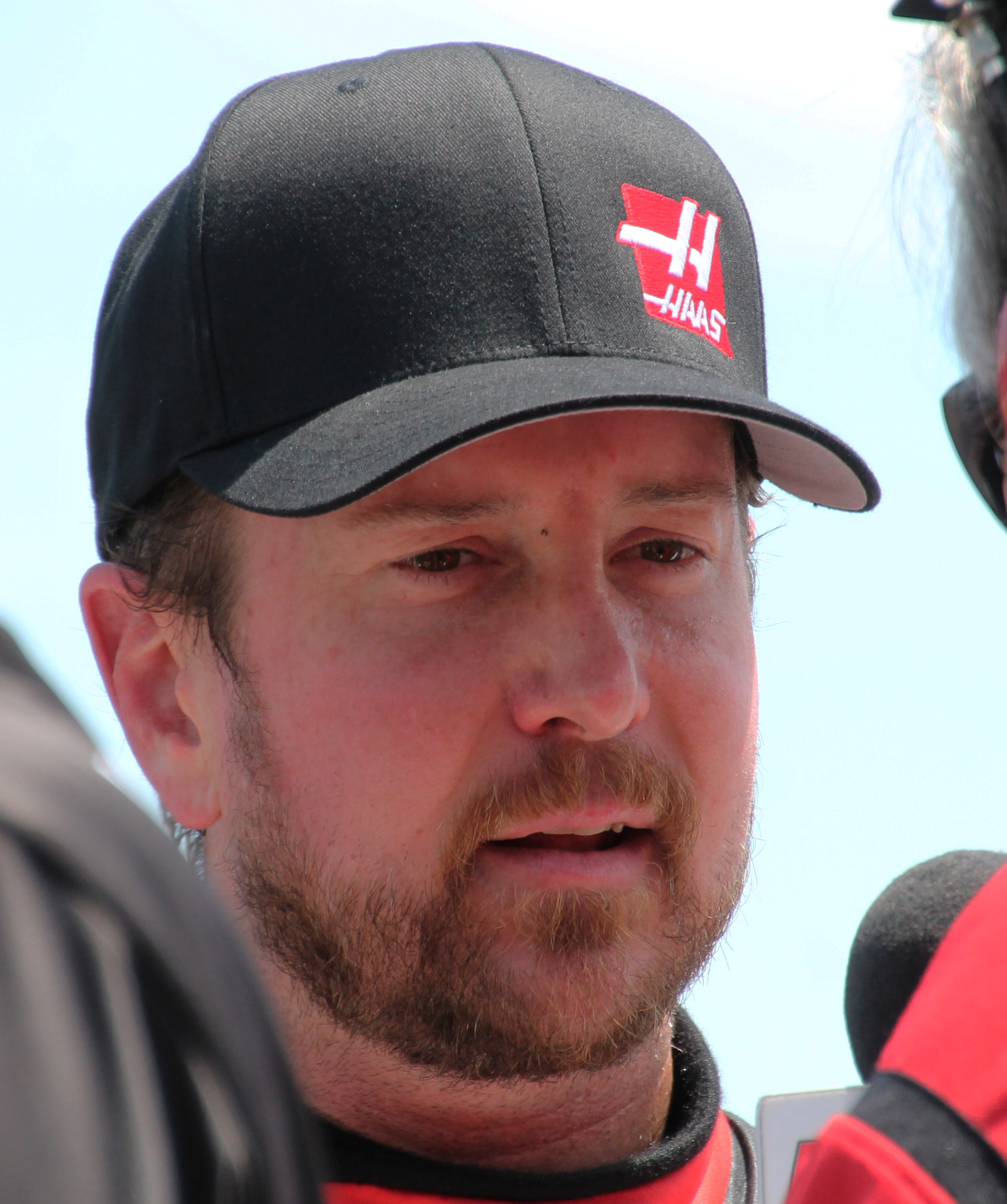
Kurt Busch (pictured in 2015) took his 19th career victory after leading a race high 234 laps

On lap 204, Sam Hornish Jr. collided with the turn one wall, drifted back down the track, and collected Bill Elliott, prompting the seventh caution. The leaders, including Kurt Busch, chose to make pit stops for car adjustments and tires during the caution. Jeff Gordon took the lead and held it at the lap 209 restart, with Kurt Busch in second and Martin third. Five laps later, the eighth caution was given; Martin cut his right-rear tire, and went backward into the turn one barrier. His car sustained heavy rear sheet metal damage but he continued to pit road. The leaders again made pit stops under caution. Jeff Gordon led at the lap 222 restart. Hamlin was passed around the outside by Kurt Busch for third on lap 235. Five laps later, he caught and overtook Johnson for the second position. Kurt Busch narrowed Jeff Gordon's lead, and passed him on the outside lane leaving turn four to retake the lead on the 251st lap. The ninth caution came out nine laps later as debris from Robby Gordon's car was located in turn four. During the caution, the leaders went to pit road for fuel, tires and car adjustments. The restart on lap 265 was led by Kurt Busch from Vickers, and Bowyer. On lap 267, Scott Speed hit the wall leaving turn four, and slid into the front of Ragan's car. Biffle was collected by Speed, and was spun into the outside wall, and Jeff Burton went through the grass, activating the tenth caution.

Five drivers elected not to make pit stops under caution. Kurt Busch led the field back to racing speed on the lap 275 restart, with Vickers second. Earnhardt was passed by Stewart, and Burton after running close by Almirola on lap 279, and fell to 14th. Vickers reduced the lead of Kurt Busch, when the final caution was necessitated after Robby Gordon's tire shredded and scattered debris on the circuit. All of the leaders, including Kurt Busch, made pit stops for tires and fuel. Edwards won the race off pit road, and led on the green–white–checker restart (extending the race to 330 laps) on lap 329. Edwards lost the lead on the outside lane to Kurt Busch on the backstretch, and he was then passed by Jeff Gordon. Kurt Busch held off Jeff Gordon on the final lap to take his first win of the season, his second at Atlanta Motor Speedway, and the 19th of his career. Jeff Gordon finished second, ahead of Edwards in third. Harvick was fourth, and Vickers fifth. Bowyer, Kahne, Stewart, Johnson, and Truex completed the top ten finishers. There were thirteen lead changes among eight different drivers during the course of the race, Kurt Busch led six times for a total of 234 laps, more than any other driver.

=== Post-race ===
A guy like Kurt could drive for any team out there. His brother is a great driver, but there's not many people out there who can hold a candle to Kurt, and that's why we hired him.

— Roger Penske on Kurt Busch ending a 22-race winless streak for Penske Championship Racing.

Kurt Busch appeared in victory lane after his Polish victory lap to celebrate his first victory of the season in front of a crowd of 94,400 attendants; the win earned him $164,175. Kurt Busch thanked his team for providing him with a car that won him the race, "This car was unbelievable. I guess good things come to those who wait. I just drove (against) the track, not the competition, We had strong pit stops, a great-handling car, a strong motor and a great assistant spotter." Jeff Gordon was encouraged with his second-place finish, "It was a great day for us, though. Just driving to the front, battling up front, leading laps, battling for the lead at times. We lost a little something there in the long runs there, middle of the way on and those guys were a little bit stronger than us. But on the restarts, we were real strong." Edwards said of his third-place finish, "Third place, considering our pit debacle down there — we were boxed in, It was just a bad pit stall selection and it didn't work out like we planned, but we made the most of it."

Two days after the race, it was announced that Watts was suspended for the next four races of the season by NASCAR for transgressing Section 12–1: "actions detrimental to stock car racing", and Article 9-15-U, a regulation which forbids crew members from entering the boundaries of the track while cars were circulating for any reason. Additionally, he was placed on probation until December 31, 2009. Crew chief Frank Kerr was also put on probation until the end of the year because he was deemed responsible for Watts' actions. NASCAR stated that had Watts not ventured into the infield, they would have waved the caution once all cars had made their pit stops. Watts admitted to reacting inappropriately and apologized for his actions. According to Ambrose, the decision to suspend Watts was the correct move to take, "It was a disaster. But I think the penalty was a good one. You can't have guys running out to the race track. It's just not the thing to do. Jimmy is a great guy. He went on instinct. You can't blame the guy for that, either. I mean, he just went on a reaction and it was the wrong reaction. He needs to be an example for others not to do the same."

The result of the race meant Jeff Gordon extended his lead in the Drivers' Championship to 43 points ahead of Bowyer in second place. By winning the race, Kurt Busch advanced from seventh to third, while Edwards' third-place finish meant he was in the third position after being in eighth place going into the race. Kenseth fell to fifth in the standings. Stewart, Kyle Busch, Harvick, Kahne, Biffle, Vickers, and Reutimann rounded out the top twelve drivers. In the Manufacturers' Championship, Chevrolet cut Ford's lead to two points. Dodge tied with Toyota in third place with 33 races left in the season. The event had a television audience of 8,877,000 million; it took 3 hours, 59 minutes and 1 second to complete the race, and the margin of victory was 0.332 seconds.

=== Race results ===
Pos	Grid	Car	Driver	Team	Manufacturer	Laps run	Points
1	2	2	Kurt Busch	Penske Championship Racing	Dodge	330	195^{1}
2	16	24	Jeff Gordon	Hendrick Motorsports	Chevrolet	330	175^{2}
3	29	99	Carl Edwards	Roush Fenway Racing	Ford	330	170^{2}
4	10	29	Kevin Harvick	Richard Childress Racing	Chevrolet	330	160
5	17	83	Brian Vickers	Red Bull Racing Team	Toyota	330	155
6	21	33	Clint Bowyer	Richard Childress Racing	Chevrolet	330	150
7	13	9	Kasey Kahne	Richard Petty Motorsports	Dodge	330	146
8	11	14	Tony Stewart	Stewart–Haas Racing	Chevrolet	330	142
9	7	48	Jimmie Johnson	Hendrick Motorsports	Chevrolet	330	143^{2}
10	23	1	Martin Truex Jr	Earnhardt Ganassi Racing	Chevrolet	330	139^{2}
11	20	88	Dale Earnhardt Jr.	Hendrick Motorsports	Chevrolet	330	130
12	30	17	Matt Kenseth	Roush Fenway Racing	Ford	330	127
13	6	11	Denny Hamlin	Joe Gibbs Racing	Toyota	329	124
14	15	31	Jeff Burton	Richard Childress Racing	Chevrolet	329	121
15	3	26	Jamie McMurray	Roush Fenway Racing	Ford	328	118
16	25	7	Casey Mears	Richard Childress Racing	Chevrolet	328	115
17	38	44	A. J. Allmendinger	Richard Petty Motorsports	Dodge	328	112
18	9	18	Kyle Busch	Joe Gibbs Racing	Toyota	327	109
19	39	6	David Ragan	Roush Fenway Racing	Ford	327	106
20	14	19	Elliott Sadler	Richard Petty Motorsports	Dodge	327	103
21	37	8	Aric Almirola	Earnhardt Ganassi Racing	Chevrolet	327	100
22	12	39	Ryan Newman	Stewart–Haas Racing	Chevrolet	327	102^{2}
23	28	12	David Stremme	Penske Championship Racing	Dodge	326	94
24	31	71	David Gilliland	TRG Motorsports	Chevrolet	326	91
25	24	55	Michael Waltrip	Michael Waltrip Racing	Toyota	326	88
26	19	7	Robby Gordon	Robby Gordon Motorsports	Toyota	326	85
27	4	42	Juan Pablo Montoya	Earnhardt Ganassi Racing	Chevrolet	325	82
28	33	98	Paul Menard	Yates Racing	Ford	325	79
29	41	34	John Andretti	Front Row Motorsports	Chevrolet	324	76
30	42	20	Joey Logano	Joe Gibbs Racing	Toyota	324	73
31	1	5	Mark Martin	Hendrick Motorsports	Chevrolet	316	75^{2}
32	18	00	David Reutimann	Michael Waltrip Racing	Toyota	305	67
33	32	43	Reed Sorenson	Richard Petty Motorsports	Dodge	264	64
34	5	16	Greg Biffle	Roush Fenway Racing	Ford	262	61
35	26	82	Scott Speed	Red Bull Racing Team	Toyota	262	58
36	35	21	Bill Elliott	Wood Brothers Racing	Ford	201	55
37	36	77	Sam Hornish Jr.	Penske Championship Racing	Dodge	199	52
38	34	47	Marcos Ambrose	JTG Daugherty Racing	Toyota	179	49
39	8	87	Joe Nemechek	NEMCO Motorsports	Toyota	110	51^{2}
40	40	96	Bobby Labonte	Hall of Fame Racing	Ford	103	43
41	27	66	Dave Blaney	Prism Motorsports	Toyota	82	40
42	22	28	Travis Kvapil	Yates Racing	Ford	32	37
43	43	09	Mike Bliss	Phoenix Racing	Dodge	21	34
^{1} Includes ten bonus points for leading the most laps
^{2} includes five bonus points for leading a lap

== Standings after the race ==
Drivers' Championship standings

Pos	+/–	Driver	Points
1		Jeff Gordon	634
2		Clint Bowyer	591 (−43)
3	4	Kurt Busch	588 (−46)
4	5	Carl Edwards	547 (−87)
5	2	Matt Kenseth	546 (−88)
6	2	Tony Stewart	521 (−113)
7	1	Kyle Busch	514 (−120)
8	3	Kevin Harvick	511 (−123)
9	4	Kasey Kahne	484 (−150)
10	6	Greg Biffle	480 (−154)
11	6	Brian Vickers	477 (−157)
12	7	David Reutimann	475 (−159)

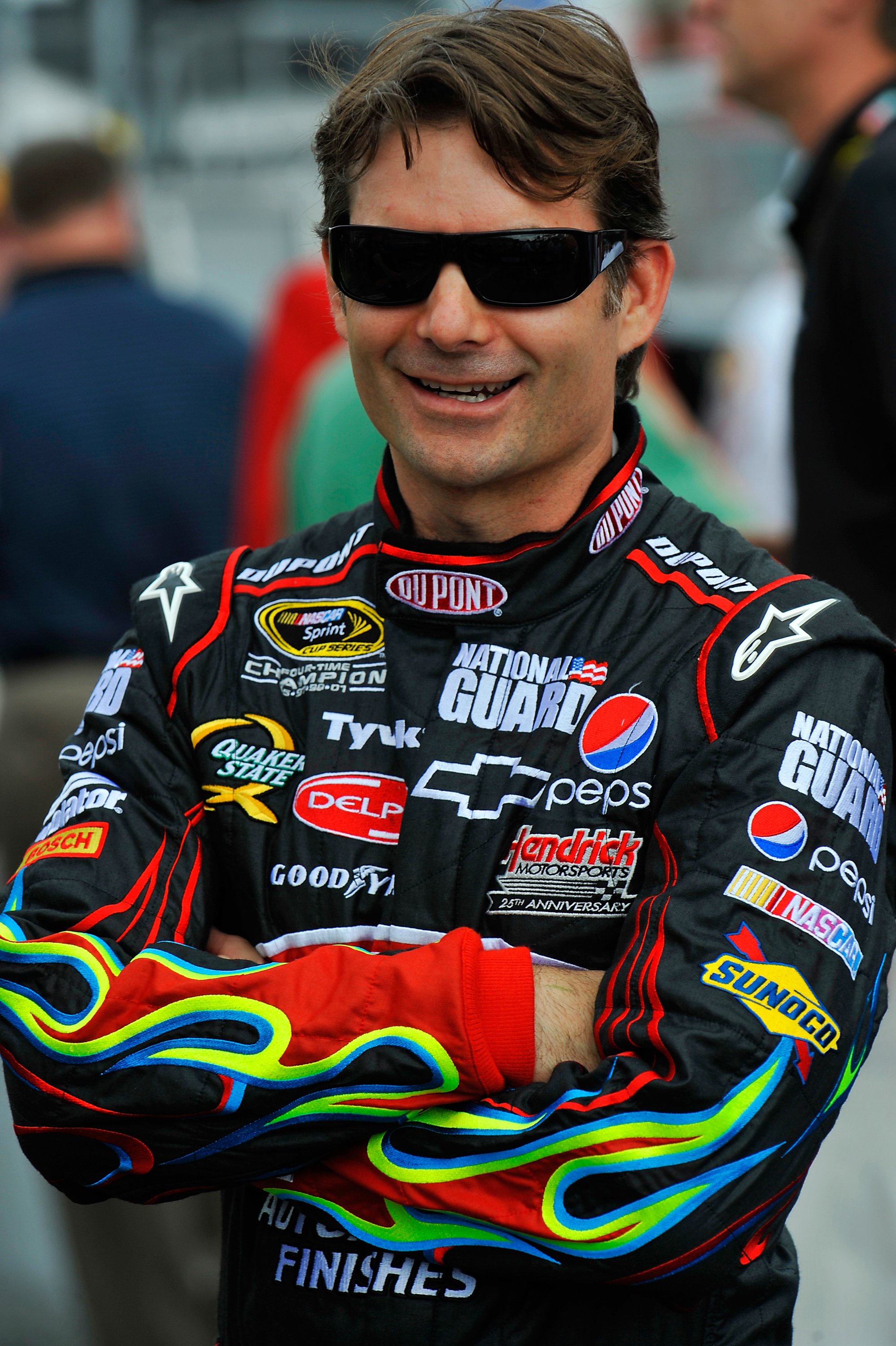
Jeff Gordon remained the points leader after coming third in the race.

Manufacturers' Championship standings

Pos	+/–	Manufacturer	Points
1		Ford	26
2		Chevrolet	24 (−2)
3		Toyota	19 (−7)
4		Dodge	19 (−7)

- Note: Only the top twelve positions are included for the driver standings.

Previous race: 2009 Shelby 427	Sprint Cup Series; 2009 season	Next race: 2009 Food City 500
