= 2009 Shelby 427 =

Race details
- Race 3 of 36 in the 2009 NASCAR Sprint Cup Series
- 2009 Shelby 427 logo
- Date: March 1, 2009
- Location: Las Vegas Motor Speedway in Clark County, Nevada
- Course: Permanent racing facility
- Course length: 1.5 miles (2.4 km)
- Distance: 285 laps, 427.5 mi (687.994 km)
- Weather: Temperatures up to 90 °F (32 °C); wind speeds climbing up to 18.1 miles per hour (29.1 km/h)
- Average speed: 119.515 miles per hour (192.341 km/h)

Pole position
Driver	Kyle Busch	Joe Gibbs Racing
- Time: 29.033

Most laps led
Driver	Jimmie Johnson	Hendrick Motorsports
- Laps: 92

Winner
No. 18	Kyle Busch	Joe Gibbs Racing

Television in the United States
- Network: Fox
- Announcers: Mike Joy, Darrell Waltrip and Larry McReynolds

The 2009 Shelby 427 was the third race of the 2009 NASCAR Sprint Cup Series. It was held on March 1, 2009 at Las Vegas Motor Speedway in Las Vegas, Nevada. The race was won by Kyle Busch of Joe Gibbs Racing.

The race was broadcast on Fox, with radio coverage by PRN (terrestrial) and SiriusXM (satellite).

The program for the 2009 Shelby 427, featuring Carroll Shelby.

The race title reflects the title sponsor, Carroll Shelby International, which has its home base at Las Vegas Motor Speedway, and the Shelby Cobra 427, which is made in Nevada. The race had previously been 400.5 miles (644.5 km) in length, but had an extra 27 miles (43 km) added into the race, making for an additional 18 laps. The race would return to 400.5 miles the following year and has run at the same scheduled distance since.

== Entry list ==
Car	Driver	Make	Team
00	David Reutimann	Toyota	Michael Waltrip
1	Martin Truex Jr.	Chevrolet	Teresa Earnhardt
2	Kurt Busch	Dodge	Walter Czarnecki
5	Mark Martin	Chevrolet	Mary Hendrick
6	David Ragan	Ford	Mike Dee
07	Casey Mears	Chevrolet	Richard Childress
7	Robby Gordon	Toyota	Robby Gordon
8	Aric Almirola	Chevrolet	Chip Ganassi
09	Sterling Marlin	Dodge	James Finch
9	Kasey Kahne	Dodge	George Gillett Jr.
11	Denny Hamlin	Toyota	J D Gibbs
12	David Stremme	Dodge	Roger Penske
13	Max Papis	Toyota	Bob Germain
14	Tony Stewart	Chevrolet	Margaret Haas
16	Greg Biffle	Ford	Jack Roush
17	Matt Kenseth	Ford	John Henry
18	Kyle Busch	Toyota	Joe Gibbs
19	Elliott Sadler	Dodge	George Gillett Jr.
20	Joey Logano	Toyota	Joe Gibbs
24	Jeff Gordon	Chevrolet	Rick Hendrick
25	Brad Keselowski	Chevrolet	Rick Hendrick
26	Jamie McMurray	Ford	Geoff Smith
28	Travis Kvapil	Ford	Jeff Moorad
29	Kevin Harvick	Chevrolet	Richard Childress
31	Jeff Burton	Chevrolet	Richard Childress
33	Clint Bowyer	Chevrolet	Bobby Ginn III
34	John Andretti	Chevrolet	Teresa Earnhardt
36	Scott Riggs	Toyota	Tommy Baldwin
37	Tony Raines	Dodge	Brad Jenkins
39	Ryan Newman	Chevrolet	Tony Stewart
41	Jeremy Mayfield	Toyota	Jeremy Mayfield
42	Juan Pablo Montoya	Chevrolet	Teresa Earnhardt
43	Reed Sorenson	Dodge	Richard Petty
44	A.J. Allmendinger	Dodge	George Gillett Jr
47	Marcos Ambrose	Toyota	Rob Kauffman
48	Jimmie Johnson	Chevrolet	Jeff Gordon
51	Dexter Bean	Dodge	David Bean
55	Michael Waltrip	Toyota	Michael Waltrip
64	Todd Bodine	Toyota	Larry Gunselman
66	Dave Blaney	Toyota	Phil Parsons
71	David Gilliland	Chevrolet	Kevin Buckler
73	Mike Garvey	Dodge	Barry Haefele
77	Sam Hornish Jr.	Dodge	Bill Davis
78	Regan Smith	Chevrolet	Barney Visser
82	Scott Speed	Toyota	Dietrich Mateschitz
83	Brian Vickers	Toyota	Dietrich Mateschitz
87	Joe Nemechek	Toyota	Andrea Nemechek
88	Dale Earnhardt Jr.	Chevrolet	Rick Hendrick
96	Bobby Labonte	Ford	Jeffrey Moorad
98	Paul Menard	Ford	Max Jones
99	Carl Edwards	Ford	Jack Roush

== Qualifying ==
Kyle Busch won the pole for the Shelby 427 with a new track record of 185.995 mph.

=== Full qualifying results ===
Pos.	Car #	Driver	Make	Avg. Speed	Time	Behind
1	18	Kyle Busch	Toyota	185.995	29.033	0.000
2	2	Kurt Busch	Dodge	185.707	29.078	00.045
3	48	Jimmie Johnson	Chevrolet	185.688	29.081	00.048
4	00	David Reutimann	Toyota	185.624	29.091	00.058
5	47	Marcos Ambrose	Toyota	185.459	29.117	00.084
6	39	Ryan Newman	Chevrolet	185.395	29.127	00.094
7	9	Kasey Kahne	Dodge	185.382	29.129	00.096
8	5	Mark Martin	Chevrolet	185.312	29.140	00.107
9	29	Kevin Harvick	Chevrolet	185.281	29.145	00.112
10	14	Tony Stewart	Chevrolet	185.217	29.155	00.122
11	12	David Stremme	Dodge	185.077	29.177	00.144
12	77	Sam Hornish Jr.	Dodge	184.988	29.191	00.158
13	25	Brad Keselowski	Chevrolet	184.786	29.223	00.190
14	31	Jeff Burton	Chevrolet	184.565	29.258	00.225
15	55	Michael Waltrip	Toyota	184.540	29.262	00.229
16	99	Carl Edwards	Ford	184.495	29.269	00.236
17	96	Bobby Labonte	Ford	184.432	29.279	00.246
18	78	Regan Smith	Chevrolet	184.432	29.279	00.246
19	44	AJ Allmendinger	Dodge	184.395	29.285	00.252
20	20	Joey Logano	Toyota	184.388	29.286	00.253
21	83	Brian Vickers	Toyota	184.168	29.321	00.288
22	87	Joe Nemechek	Toyota	184.162	29.322	00.289
23	42	Juan Pablo Montoya	Chevrolet	184.118	29.329	00.296
24	16	Greg Biffle	Ford	184.005	29.347	00.314
25	1	Martin Truex Jr.	Chevrolet	183.999	29.348	00.315
26	13	Max Papis	Toyota	183.974	29.352	00.319
27	8	Aric Almirola	Chevrolet	183.936	29.358	00.325
28	24	Jeff Gordon	Chevrolet	183.798	29.380	00.347
29	34	John Andretti	Chevrolet	183.786	29.382	00.349
30	71	David Gilliland	Chevrolet	183.749	29.388	00.355
31	88	Dale Earnhardt Jr.	Chevrolet	183.742	29.389	00.356
32	7	Robby Gordon	Toyota	183.486	29.430	00.397
33	19	Elliott Sadler	Dodge	183.461	29.434	00.401
34	11	Denny Hamlin	Toyota	183.293	29.461	00.428
35	6	David Ragan	Ford	183.144	29.485	00.452
36	98	Paul Menard	Ford	182.921	29.521	00.488
37	33	Clint Bowyer	Chevrolet	182.772	29.545	00.512
38	26	Jamie McMurray	Ford	182.574	29.577	00.544
39	43	Reed Sorenson	Dodge	182.469	29.594	00.561
40	17	Matt Kenseth	Ford	182.143	29.647	00.614
41	07	Casey Mears	Chevrolet	181.928	29.682	00.649
42	82	Scott Speed	Toyota	181.257	29.792	00.759
43	64	Todd Bodine	Toyota	183.231	29.471	00.438
Failed to qualify
44	28	Travis Kvapil	Ford	183.181	29.479	
45	66	Dave Blaney	Toyota	182.673	29.561	
46	73	Mike Garvey	Dodge	182.457	29.596	
47	41	Jeremy Mayfield	Toyota	182.389	29.607	
48	09	Sterling Marlin	Dodge	181.543	29.745	
49	36	Scott Riggs	Toyota	180.820	29.864	
50	37	Tony Raines	Dodge	180.331	29.945	
51	51	Dexter Bean	Dodge	174.154	31.007	

== Race recap ==
The Las Vegas Motor Speedway chaplain, Joe Freiburger gave the invocation. Jersey Boys performed the national anthem and Carroll Shelby gave the command to start engines.

David Reutimann, Kyle Busch, Marcos Ambrose, Scott Speed and Brian Vickers were sent to the back of the field because of engine changes.

Kurt Busch and Jimmie Johnson led the field to the green flag. Johnson led the first lap; Brad Keselowski hit the wall out of turn 4 causing a flat tire and the first caution of the day. Matt Kenseth reported engine trouble, came onto pit road where his crew fixed the problem, but Kenseth was penalized for exiting too fast on pit road. Kenseth served the penalty of restarting from the tail end of the field.

The race restarted on lap 6 with Johnson, Kurt Busch, Harvick, Newman and Stremme in the Top 5. Kenseth's engine blew on the front stretch on lap 7 while Todd Bodine spun out of turn 2 after slight contact from behind by Hamlin, bringing out the second caution of the day. Keselowski got the lucky dog free pass.

The race restarted on lap 11 with no position changes in the Top 5. Johnson continued to lead laps. Brad Keselowski drove his car to the garage on lap 36. Within 50 laps of the race, McMurray gained nineteen positions, Jeff Gordon and Reutimann gained sixteen, Biffle gained fifteen, and Vickers gained fourteen. Green flag pit stops ensued on lap 48. Earnhardt Jr. served a pass through penalty for exiting too fast on pit road. Regan Smith and Casey Mears also served pass through penalties for entering too fast on pit road. Edwards and Kyle Busch each led two laps and Logano led a lap during the green flag pit stops.

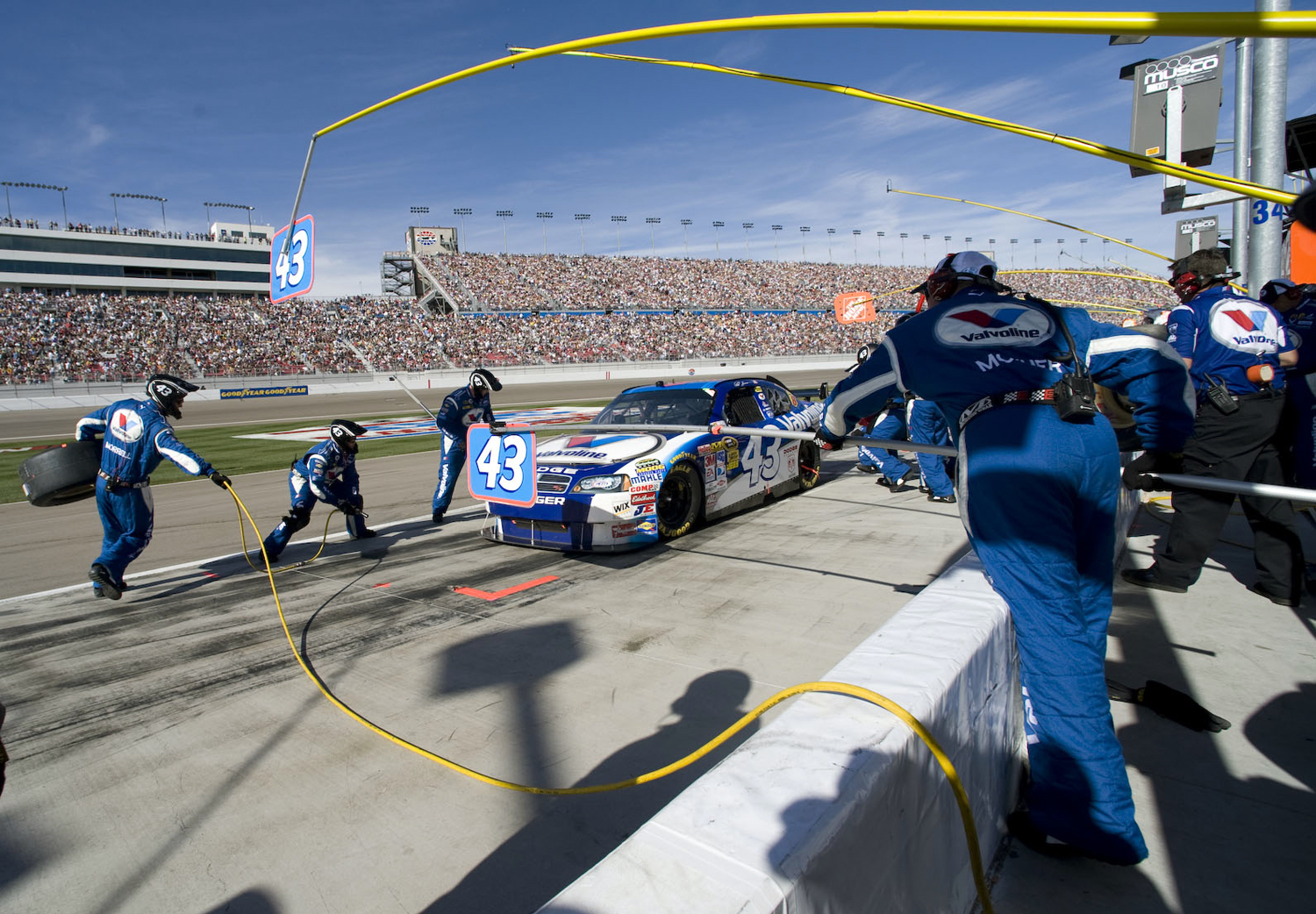
Reed Sorenson pits during the race

Caution would come out on lap 60 for debris on the track. Newman won the lucky dog free pass. Kahne, Waltrip, Hamlin and others entered pit road during the caution. John Andretti, David Gilliland, Scott Speed, Clint Bowyer, Earnhardt Jr., Regan Smith, Todd Bodine, A.J. Allmendinger, Robby Gordon, Martin Truex Jr. and Elliott Sadler were a lap down when the caution flag was waved.

The race restarted on lap 65 with Johnson, Edwards, Kurt Busch, Harvick and Biffle in the top five. McMurray, running in 13th, was hit from behind by Logano and slid out of turn 2, but maintained control. McMurray dropped to 26th as a result. On Lap 74, Regan Smith came onto pit road for engine troubles, bringing out the fourth caution of the day. Clint Bowyer got the free pass. During the round of pit stops, Jeff Burton and Kyle Busch gained six positions, Jeff Gordon and Hamlin gained five, Harvick, Stewart, and Montoya gained four, and Mark Martin gained two. Kurt Busch lost four spots, and Johnson, taking four tires, lost nine.

The race restarted on lap 83 with Harvick, Stewart, Biffle, Jeff Gordon, Martin, Kurt Busch, Burton, Montoya, Hamlin and Johnson in the top ten. In two laps, Biffle took the lead from Harvick. On Lap 90, Gordon took second place from Harvick. Brad Keselowski returned to the track 57 laps down in the 42nd position. On Lap 95, Edwards made contact with Stremme's left rear quarter panel, sending Stremme spinning out of turn 2, and bringing out the fifth caution of the race. Earnhardt Jr. got the free pass. Harvick lost two spots, Burton gained three, Almirola gained fourteen, and Bowyer gained eight during the round of pit stops. Biffle and Martin stayed on the track.

The race restarted on lap 100 with Biffle, Martin, Jeff Gordon, Kurt Busch and Johnson in the top five. Upon restarting, Bowyer and Montoya made contact entering turn 1, but no caution flew. Montoya entered pit road and exited in the 27th position. On Lap 122, Mark Martin, running in 4th, blew his engine, bringing out the sixth caution. Martin Truex Jr. got the free pass. During the pit stop round, Johnson and McMurray gained two spots, and Biffle and Stewart lost two. Kasey Kahne stayed out to lead a lap before entering pit road.

Johnson, Jeff Gordon, Biffle, McMurray, Burton, Stewart, Harvick, Kyle Busch, Hamlin and Sam Hornish Jr. were in the top ten during the restart on lap 131. The seventh caution came out on lap 138 when Reed Sorenson lost control exiting turn 2 and hit the outside wall of the backstretch; Robby Gordon got the lucky dog free pass. Hornish Jr. entered pit road from the 10th position. The field restarted on lap 143 with Johnson as the leader. Almirola hit the outside wall in turn 3 then slowed on the backstretch where Kasey Kahne tried to avoid hitting Almirola's car. Kahne slid off the track, making slight contact with Almirola. Paul Menard, Bobby Labonte and Robby Gordon, from the end of the lead lap, made pit stops.

The race restarted on lap 149 with Johnson, Jeff Gordon, Biffle, Stewart and Kyle Busch in the top five. Gordon took the lead away from Johnson in two laps. On lap 160, Jeff Gordon led his 20,000th lap in the Cup Series. On lap 164, Michael Waltrip, running in the 20th position, lost control in turn 4, hitting the outside wall. This brought out the eighth caution. David Gilliland got the free pass. During the round of pitstops, Burton gained seven spots, Labonte gained twelve, Vickers gained thirteen, and Truex Jr. gained fourteen. Biffle lost two spots, and Jeff Gordon and Johnson both lost five.

The race restarted on lap 169 with Burton, Labonte, Vickers, Truex Jr., Biffle, Jeff Gordon, Johnson, Kyle Busch, Stewart and Edwards in the top ten. One lap later, Hamlin, running in 13th, lost control between turns 3 and 4, sliding across the outside wall, bringing out the tenth caution. John Andretti got the free pass. The field restarted on lap 175 with Burton in the lead. Johnson took second from Labonte on lap 187.

The eleventh caution came on lap 220, when Jeff Gordon missed the entrance to pit road and blew his left front tire. Edwards beat Labonte off pit road for the second position, but Edwards' crew missed placing a lug nut, forcing him back into the pits. Burton maintained the lead off pit road. David Gilliland got the free pass for the second time. The field restarted on lap 228 with Burton, Labonte, Kyle Busch, Vickers and Reutimann in the top five. Busch, the pole winner, took the lead from Burton in less than one lap.

The twelfth caution came for debris on lap 259. Sam Hornish Jr. got the free pass. Bowyer stayed on the track as the field entered pit road. Burton gained five spots, Jeff Gordon gained seven, Kyle Busch lost two, and Labonte and Vickers both lost four. Labonte and Johnson nearly collided as Labonte was leaving his pit box and Johnson was entering his.

The race restarted on lap 264 with Bowyer, Burton, Jeff Gordon, Kyle Busch, Reutimann, Edwards, Labonte, Vickers, Kahne and McMurray in the top ten. In two laps, Kyle Busch was in third behind Bowyer and Burton. On lap 267, Busch took second from Burton out of turn 2. In the next lap, Busch took the lead from Bowyer out of turn 2. Caution came for the thirteenth time on lap 269 after Menard, racing between Ambrose and Logano, lost control and hit the outside wall out of turn 4. Harvick got the free pass. From the end of the lead lap, Earnhardt Jr., Robby Gordon, Hornish Jr. and Gilliland made pitstops.

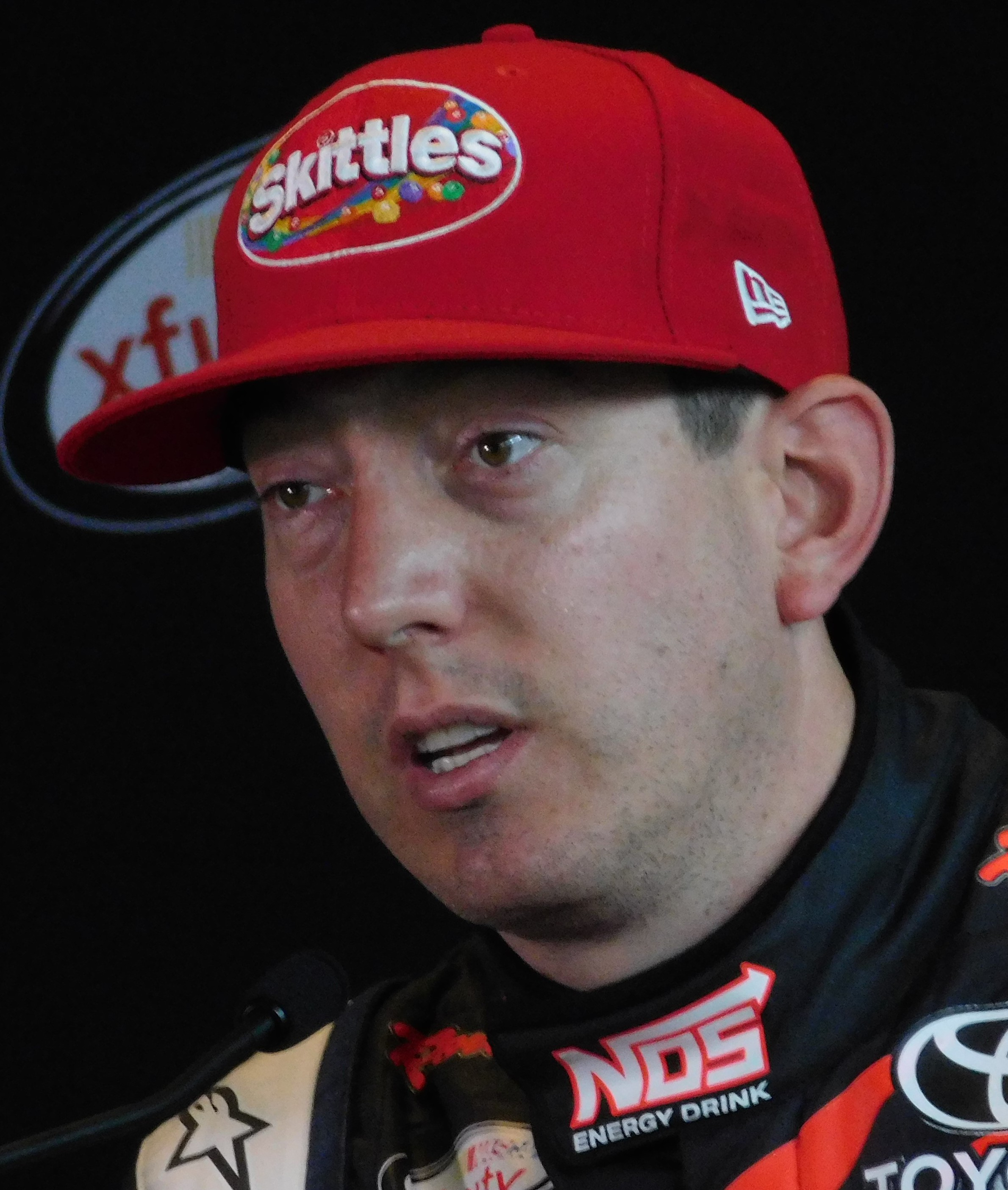
Kyle Busch won the race.

The field restarted on lap 278 with Kyle Busch, Burton, Bowyer, Reutimann, Jeff Gordon, Edwards, Labonte, Vickers, McMurray and Jimmie Johnson in the top ten. Caution came a lap later when Johnson, running in 10th, lost control in turn 2 and hit the outside wall, damaging his front right and back right end. The race restarted on lap 282 with Kyle Busch as the leader. With two to go, Bowyer passed teammate Burton for second as Edwards's engine blew. Edwards managed to keep his car away the field, avoiding a caution. Kyle Busch, who started from the back from pole position, took the checkered flag for the first time in the season.

Clint Bowyer finished second, ahead of Richard Childress Racing teammate Jeff Burton. David Reutimann was in fourth, his first career top 5 finish in the Cup series. Bobby Labonte, in fifth, had the highest-finishing Ford. Jamie McMurray finished in 9th after starting the race in 38th. Kasey Kahne had the best Dodge finish in 11th. Rookies Joey Logano and Scott Speed finished in 13th and 21st respectively. Jimmie Johnson, leading the most laps (92), finished in 24th. Stewart Haas Motorsports drivers Ryan Newman and Tony Stewart finished in 25th and 26th respectively. Daytona 500 winner Matt Kenseth finished in 43rd, behind teammate David Ragan because of engine problems.

== Race results ==
Fin.	St	#	Driver	Make	Laps	Led	Status	Points
1	1	18	Kyle Busch	Toyota	285	51	running	190
2	37	33	Clint Bowyer	Chevy	285	9	running	175
3	14	31	Jeff Burton	Chevy	285	61	running	170
4	4	00	David Reutimann	Toyota	285	0	running	160
5	17	96	Bobby Labonte	Ford	285	0	running	155
6	28	24	Jeff Gordon	Chevy	285	17	running	155
7	24	16	Greg Biffle	Ford	285	40	running	151
8	21	83	Brian Vickers	Toyota	285	0	running	142
9	38	26	Jamie McMurray	Ford	285	0	running	138
10	31	88	Dale Earnhardt Jr.	Chevy	285	0	running	134
11	7	9	Kasey Kahne	Dodge	285	1	running	135
12	9	29	Kevin Harvick	Chevy	285	9	running	132
13	20	20	Joey Logano	Toyota	285	1	running	129
14	30	71	David Gilliland	Chevy	285	0	running	121
15	32	7	Robby Gordon	Toyota	285	1	running	123
16	12	77	Sam Hornish Jr.	Dodge	285	0	running	115
17	16	99	Carl Edwards	Ford	285	2	running	117
18	11	12	David Stremme	Dodge	284	0	running	109
19	18	78	Regan Smith	Chevy	284	0	running	106
20	5	47	Marcos Ambrose	Toyota	284	0	running	103
21	42	82	Scott Speed	Toyota	284	0	running	100
22	34	11	Denny Hamlin	Toyota	284	0	running	97
23	2	2	Kurt Busch	Dodge	284	1	running	99
24	3	48	Jimmie Johnson	Chevy	284	92	running	101
25	6	39	Ryan Newman	Chevy	283	0	running	88
26	10	14	Tony Stewart	Chevy	283	0	running	85
27	15	55	Michael Waltrip	Toyota	283	0	running	82
28	29	34	John Andretti	Chevy	283	0	running	79
29	33	19	Elliott Sadler	Dodge	283	0	running	76
30	41	07	Casey Mears	Chevy	282	0	running	73
31	23	42	Juan Pablo Montoya	Chevy	281	0	running	70
32	25	1	Martin Truex Jr.	Chevy	281	0	running	67
33	19	44	A.J. Allmendinger	Dodge	281	0	running	64
34	39	43	Reed Sorenson	Dodge	278	0	running	61
35	36	98	Paul Menard	Ford	269	0	crash	58
36	26	13	Max Papis	Toyota	258	0	running	55
37	43	64	Todd Bodine	Toyota	227	0	engine	52
38	13	25	Brad Keselowski	Chevy	221	0	running	49
39	27	8	Aric Almirola	Chevy	143	0	crash	46
40	8	5	Mark Martin	Chevy	121	0	engine	43
41	22	87	Joe Nemechek	Toyota	102	0	transmission	40
42	35	6	David Ragan	Ford	72	0	engine	37
43	40	17	Matt Kenseth	Ford	6	0	engine	34
Failed to qualify
44		28	Travis Kvapil	Ford				
45		66	Dave Blaney	Toyota				
46		73	Mike Garvey	Dodge				
47		41	Jeremy Mayfield	Toyota				
48		09	Sterling Marlin	Dodge				
49		36	Scott Riggs	Toyota				
50		37	Tony Raines	Dodge				
51		51	Dexter Bean	Dodge				

== Post race notes ==
- Jeff Gordon surpassed 20,000 career laps led during the middle of the race, surpassing Rusty Wallace.

== Point standings ==
Jeff Burton moved from 31st to 18th in the standings. Kyle Busch and Bobby Labonte gained twelve spots from the 18th position and the 22nd position respectively. Kasey Kahne moved from 23rd to 13th. Brian Vickers, from 26th in the standings, was in 17th after the race. David Reutimann and David Gilliland both gained seven spots from the 12th and 44th in the standings respectively. Jaime McMurray and Dale Earnhardt, Jr. gained six spots from 28th and 35th respectively. Gaining five pointings, Kevin Harvick was in 11th, Joey Logano in 32nd, Regan Smith in 35th, and Scott Speed in 36th. Clint Bowyer was in second behind Jeff Gordon from the 6th position in the standings.

David Ragan lost sixteen spots from the eighth position to 24th. Reed Sorenson dropped to 25th from the 14th position. Martin Truex, Jr. lost nine positions from 17th in the standings. A.J. Allmendinger went from 13th to 21st in the standings. Casey Mears and Mark Martin lost seven spots from the 20th and 27th position respectively. Losing five positions in the standings, Michael Waltrip was in 12th from 7th, Juan Pablo Montoya in 15th from 10th, Elliott Salder in 16th from 11th, and John Andretti was in 30th from 25th. Kurt Busch and Tony Stewart both lost four positions from the 3rd and 4th position respectively. Daytona 500 winner Matt Kenseth dropped to 3rd from 1st in the standings.

Previous race: 2009 Auto Club 500	Sprint Cup Series; 2009 season	Next race: 2009 Kobalt Tools 500
