= 2009 Food City 500 =

Race details
- Race 5 of 36 in the 2009 NASCAR Sprint Cup Series season
- 2009 Food City 500 program cover
- Date: March 22, 2009
- Official name: Food City 500
- Location: Bristol Motor Speedway, Bristol, Tennessee
- Course: Permanent racing facility
- Course length: 0.533 miles (0.857 km)
- Distance: 503 laps, 268.099 mi (431.463 km)
- Scheduled distance: 500 laps, 266.5 mi (428.89 km)
- Weather: Temperatures up to 66 °F (19 °C); wind speeds up to 8 miles per hour (13 km/h)
- Average speed: 92.139 miles per hour (148.283 km/h)

Pole position
Driver	Mark Martin	Hendrick Motorsports
- Time: 15.256

Most laps led
Driver	Kyle Busch	Joe Gibbs Racing
- Laps: 378

Winner
No. 18	Kyle Busch	Joe Gibbs Racing

Television in the United States
- Network: Fox Broadcasting Company
- Announcers: Mike Joy, Darrell Waltrip and Larry McReynolds

The 2009 Food City 500 was the fifth race of the 2009 NASCAR Sprint Cup season. This 500 lap, 266.5 miles (428.9 km) race took place on March 22 of that year at the 0.533 miles (0.858 km) Bristol Motor Speedway in Bristol, Tennessee, and was telecast on Fox beginning at 1:30 PM EDT, with radio broadcasting being handled by Performance Racing Network (terrestrial) and Sirius XM Radio (satellite) beginning at 1 PM US EDT.

This race was the last to use the 2008 season Top 35 in owners points rule. Beginning with the next race, the Goody's Fast Pain Relief 500, each week's current standings will be used to determine automatic qualifiers for each week's race.

== Report ==
=== Background ===
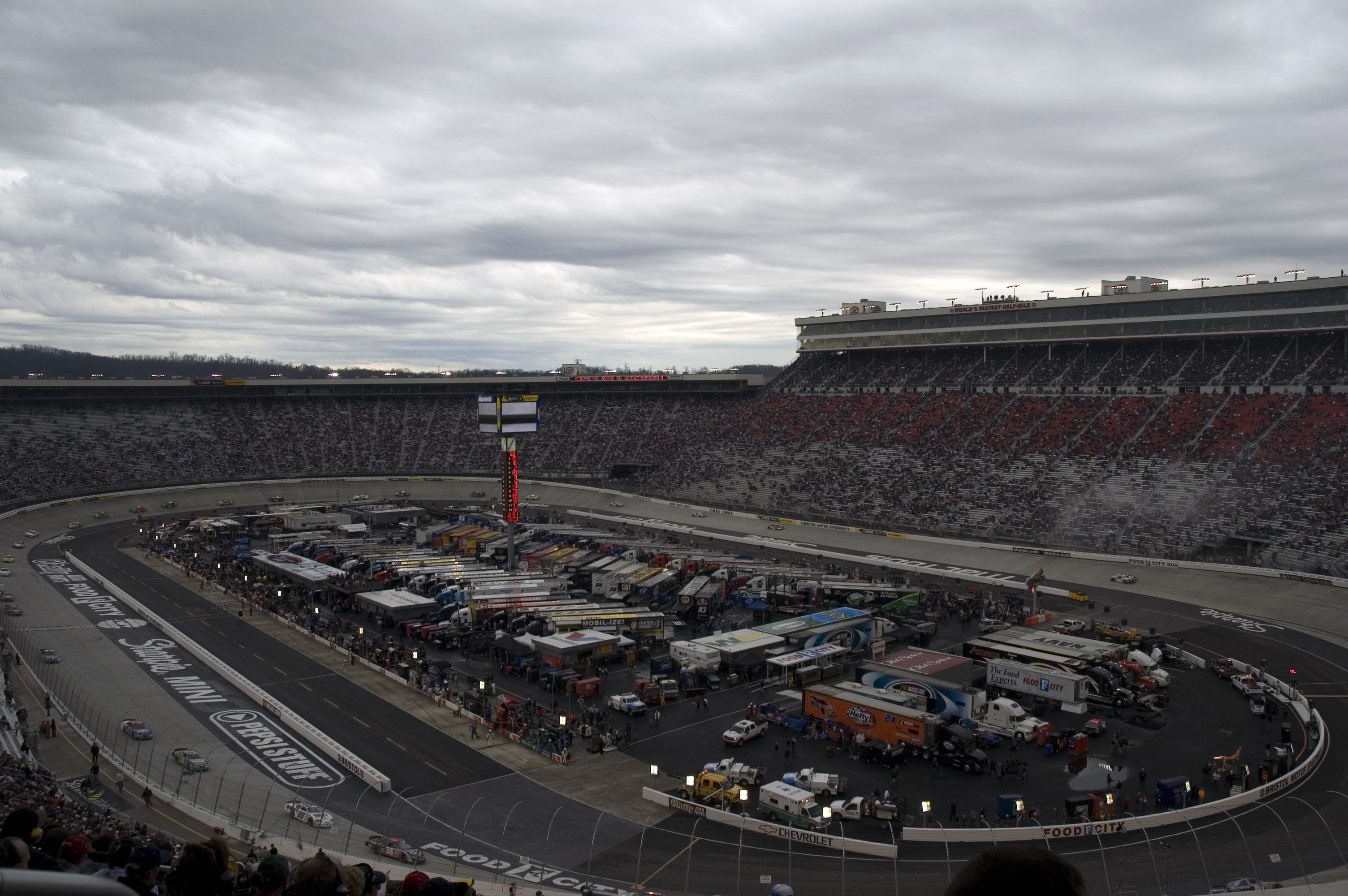
Bristol Motor Speedway, the track where the race was held.

The track, Bristol Motor Speedway, is a four-turn short track oval that is 0.533 miles (0.858 km) long. The track's turns are banked from twenty-four to thirty degrees, while the front stretch, the location of the finish line, is banked from six to ten degrees. The back stretch also has banking from six to ten degrees. The track has a seating capacity of 160,000 people. The race consisted of 500 laps, equivalent to a race distance of 266.5 miles (428.9 km). The 2008 winner was Jeff Burton.

== Entry list ==
Car	Driver	Make	Team
00	David Reutimann	Toyota	Michael Waltrip
1	Martin Truex Jr.	Chevrolet	Teresa Earnhardt
2	Kurt Busch	Dodge	Walter Czarnecki
5	Mark Martin	Chevrolet	Mary Hendrick
6	David Ragan	Ford	Mike Dee
07	Casey Mears	Chevrolet	Richard Childress
7	Robby Gordon	Toyota	Robby Gordon
8	Aric Almirola	Chevrolet	Chip Ganassi
09	Sterling Marlin	Dodge	James Finch
9	Kasey Kahne	Dodge	George Gillett Jr
11	Denny Hamlin	Toyota	J D Gibbs
12	David Stremme	Dodge	Roger Penske
14	Tony Stewart	Chevrolet	Margaret Haas
16	Greg Biffle	Ford	Jack Roush
17	Matt Kenseth	Ford	John Henry
18	Kyle Busch	Toyota	Joe Gibbs
19	Elliott Sadler	Dodge	George Gillett Jr
20	Joey Logano	Toyota	Joe Gibbs
24	Jeff Gordon	Chevrolet	Rick Hendrick
26	Jamie McMurray	Ford	Geoff Smith
28	Travis Kvapil	Ford	Jeff Moorad
29	Kevin Harvick	Chevrolet	Richard Childress
31	Jeff Burton	Chevrolet	Richard Childress
33	Clint Bowyer	Chevrolet	Bobby Ginn III
34	John Andretti	Chevrolet	Teresa Earnhardt
36	Scott Riggs	Toyota	Tommy Baldwin
39	Ryan Newman	Chevrolet	Tony Stewart
41	Jeremy Mayfield	Toyota	Jeremy Mayfield
42	Juan Pablo Montoya	Chevrolet	Teresa Earnhardt
43	Reed Sorenson	Dodge	Richard Petty
44	A.J. Allmendinger	Dodge	George Gillett Jr
47	Marcos Ambrose	Toyota	Rob Kauffman
48	Jimmie Johnson	Chevrolet	Jeff Gordon
55	Michael Waltrip	Toyota	Michael Waltrip
64	Todd Bodine	Toyota	Larry Gunselman
66	Dave Blaney	Toyota	Phil Parsons
71	David Gilliland	Chevrolet	Kevin Buckler
77	Sam Hornish Jr.	Dodge	Bill Davis
82	Scott Speed	Toyota	Dietrich Mateschitz
83	Brian Vickers	Toyota	Dietrich Mateschitz
87	Joe Nemechek	Toyota	Andrea Nemechek
88	Dale Earnhardt Jr.	Chevrolet	Rick Hendrick
96	Bobby Labonte	Ford	Jeffrey Moorad
98	Paul Menard	Ford	Max Jones
99	Carl Edwards	Ford	Jack Roush

== Qualifying ==
Mark Martin won his second pole in a row. He will start alongside Ryan Newman and teammate Jimmie Johnson in third.

=== Full qualifying results ===
Pos	Car #	Driver	Make	Speed	Time	Behind
1	5	Mark Martin	Chevrolet	125.773	15.256	0.000
2	39	Ryan Newman	Chevrolet	125.741	15.260	-0.004
3	48	Jimmie Johnson	Chevrolet	125.453	15.295	-0.039
4	16	Greg Biffle	Ford	125.289	15.315	-0.059
5	9	Kasey Kahne	Dodge	124.954	15.356	-0.100
6	00	David Reutimann	Toyota	124.808	15.374	-0.118
7	43	Reed Sorenson	Dodge	124.541	15.407	-0.151
8	66	Dave Blaney	Toyota	124.508	15.411	-0.155
9	26	Jamie McMurray	Ford	124.492	15.413	-0.157
10	24	Jeff Gordon	Chevrolet	124.267	15.441	-0.185
11	82	Scott Speed	Toyota	124.194	15.450	-0.194
12	47	Marcos Ambrose	Toyota	124.130	15.458	-0.202
13	42	Juan Montoya	Chevrolet	124.130	15.458	-0.202
14	71	David Gilliland	Chevrolet	123.946	15.481	-0.225
15	14	Tony Stewart	Chevrolet	123.897	15.487	-0.231
16	64	Todd Bodine	Toyota	123.698	15.512	-0.256
17	28	Travis Kvapil	Ford	123.658	15.517	-0.261
18	8	Aric Almirola	Chevrolet	123.650	15.518	-0.262
19	18	Kyle Busch	Toyota	123.626	15.521	-0.265
20	1	Martin Truex Jr	Chevrolet	123.610	15.523	-0.267
21	55	Michael Waltrip	Toyota	123.562	15.529	-0.273
22	19	Elliott Sadler	Dodge	123.538	15.532	-0.276
23	20	Joey Logano	Toyota	123.523	15.534	-0.278
24	11	Denny Hamlin	Toyota	123.491	15.538	-0.282
25	77	Sam Hornish Jr	Dodge	123.427	15.546	-0.290
26	44	AJ Allmendinger	Dodge	123.427	15.546	-0.290
27	83	Brian Vickers	Toyota	123.372	15.553	-0.297
28	87	Joe Nemechek	Toyota	123.324	15.559	-0.303
29	09	Sterling Marlin	Dodge	123.189	15.576	-0.320
30	12	David Stremme	Dodge	123.118	15.585	-0.329
31	29	Kevin Harvick	Chevrolet	123.071	15.591	-0.335
32	33	Clint Bowyer	Chevrolet	123.032	15.596	-0.340
33	2	Kurt Busch	Dodge	123.024	15.597	-0.341
34	17	Matt Kenseth	Ford	122.827	15.622	-0.366
35	88	Dale Earnhardt Jr	Chevrolet	122.725	15.635	-0.379
36	7	Robby Gordon	Toyota	122.709	15.637	-0.381
37	96	Bobby Labonte	Ford	122.654	15.644	-0.388
38	07	Casey Mears	Chevrolet	122.404	15.676	-0.420
39	99	Carl Edwards	Ford	122.349	15.683	-0.427
40	34	John Andretti	Chevrolet	122.248	15.696	-0.440
41	31	Jeff Burton	Chevrolet	121.952	15.734	-0.478
42	6	David Ragan	Toyota	121.194	15.733	-0.447
43	98	Paul Menard	Ford	121.898	15.741	-0.451
Failed to qualify
44	36	Scott Riggs	Toyota	122.193	15.703	
45	41	Jeremy Mayfield	Toyota	122.162	15.707	

== Pre-Race Notes ==
- Michael Waltrip smacked the wall in practice and was forced to go to a backup car.
- The car of Kevin Harvick was so tight it would not turn at about 100 miles per hour. After inspecting the car, it was determined that the cause was the engine rubbing against the tires, but Harvick did not go to a backup car.
- Bobby Labonte and Greg Biffle both spun off turn 4 at one point in practice, but both cars suffered minor to no damage.

== Race recap ==
Bobby Allison, a NASCAR Cup Series driver who drove in the formative years in NASCAR, became the honorary starter for this race. He would give out the green flag and later surrendered his "duty" to the regular starter for the other flags.

The pundits predicted that Carl Edwards, Jeff Gordon and Kyle Busch would be triumphant in the race while Mark Martin, Jamie McMurray, David Ragan and Brian Vickers didn't have much of a chance to finish the race in a respectable position.

Kyle Busch led 378 laps en route to his second victory of 2009. JGR teammate Denny Hamlin finished second, while Hendrick Motorsports teammates Jimmie Johnson and Jeff Gordon finished third and fourth, while Kasey Kahne rounded up the top 5. Jeff Gordon still led the points standings, and got his 4th top-10 and 3rd top-5 of the season.

== Race results ==
Fin	St	#	Driver	Make	Laps	Led	Status	Pts	Winnings
1	19	18	Kyle Busch	Toyota	503	378	running	195	232998
2	24	11	Denny Hamlin	Toyota	503	7	running	175	138275
3	3	48	Jimmie Johnson	Chevy	503	88	running	170	168876
4	10	24	Jeff Gordon	Chevy	503	0	running	160	146051
5	5	9	Kasey Kahne	Dodge	503	0	running	155	143398
6	1	5	Mark Martin	Chevy	503	2	running	155	109575
7	2	39	Ryan Newman	Chevy	503	25	running	151	129729
8	40	31	Jeff Burton	Chevy	503	0	running	142	137906
9	12	42	Juan Pablo Montoya	Chevy	503	0	running	138	133473
10	13	47	Marcos Ambrose	Toyota	503	0	running	134	113923
11	32	2	Kurt Busch	Dodge	503	0	running	130	109075
12	6	00	David Reutimann	Toyota	503	1	running	132	116973
13	31	33	Clint Bowyer	Chevy	503	0	running	124	92975
14	34	88	Dale Earnhardt, Jr.	Chevy	503	0	running	121	105650
15	38	99	Carl Edwards	Ford	503	0	running	118	138606
16	26	44	A.J. Allmendinger	Dodge	503	0	running	115	91225
17	15	14	Tony Stewart	Chevy	502	0	running	112	101648
18	17	28	Travis Kvapil	Ford	502	0	running	109	91475
19	29	12	David Stremme	Dodge	502	0	running	106	123540
20	22	19	Elliott Sadler	Dodge	502	0	running	103	99975
21	35	7	Robby Gordon	Toyota	501	0	running	100	108660
22	36	96	Bobby Labonte	Ford	501	0	running	97	117629
23	7	43	Reed Sorenson	Dodge	501	0	running	94	127676
24	37	07	Casey Mears	Chevy	501	0	running	91	103900
25	42	98	Paul Menard	Ford	501	0	running	88	119681
26	20	1	Martin Truex, Jr.	Chevy	501	0	running	85	124190
27	41	6	David Ragan	Ford	500	0	running	82	96450
28	11	82	Scott Speed	Toyota	500	0	running	79	101873
29	27	83	Brian Vickers	Toyota	499	0	running	76	116023
30	30	29	Kevin Harvick	Chevy	499	0	running	73	122703
31	25	77	Sam Hornish, Jr.	Dodge	499	0	running	70	103810
32	21	55	Michael Waltrip	Toyota	497	2	running	72	91975
33	33	17	Matt Kenseth	Ford	497	0	running	64	131115
34	39	34	John Andretti	Chevy	495	0	running	61	91875
35	18	8	Aric Almirola	Chevy	494	0	running	58	91825
36	14	71	David Gilliland	Chevy	493	0	running	55	83775
37	9	26	Jamie McMurray	Ford	491	0	running	52	91725
38	23	20	Joey Logano	Toyota	490	0	engine	49	131026
39	4	16	Greg Biffle	Ford	326	0	engine	46	103325
40	43	09	Sterling Marlin	Dodge	91	0	steering	43	83550
41	28	87	Joe Nemechek	Toyota	82	0	rear end	40	83475
42	16	64	Todd Bodine	Toyota	58	0	crash	37	83390
43	8	66	Dave Blaney	Toyota	33	0	steering	34	82968

Previous race: 2009 Kobalt Tools 500	Sprint Cup Series; 2009 season	Next race: 2009 Goody's Fast Pain Relief 500
