= Dale Earnhardt Jr. =

American racing driver (born 1974)

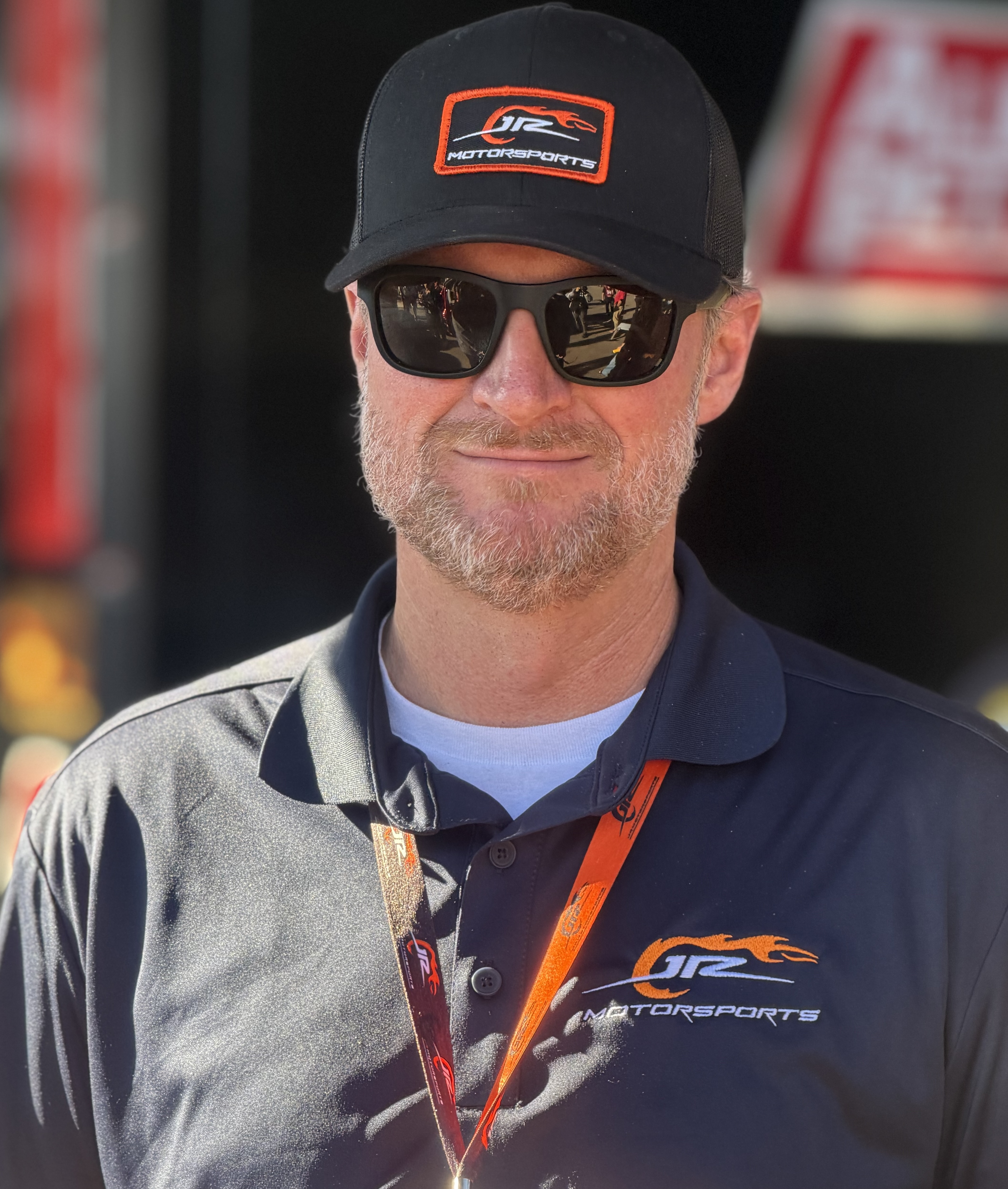
- Earnhardt Jr. at Phoenix Raceway in 2025
- Born: Ralph Dale Earnhardt Jr. October 10, 1974 (age 52); Kannapolis, North Carolina, U.S.
- Height: 6 ft 0 in (1.83 m)
- Weight: 178 lb (81 kg)
- Achievements: As Driver: 1998, 1999 NASCAR Busch Series Champion; 2004, 2014 Daytona 500 Winner; 2000 The Winston Winner; 2003, 2008 Budweiser Shootout Winner; 2003, 2004, 2008, 2015, 2016 Can-Am Duel Winner; Records: 4 straight wins at Talladega Superspeedway (Fall 2001–Spring 2003); As Car Owner: 2004, 2005, 2014, 2017, 2018, 2024 NASCAR O'Reilly Auto Parts Series Champion (outright); 2020 NASCAR Local Racing Series Champion (outright); 2017, 2022, 2023 CARS Late Model Stock Car Tour Champion (outright)
- Awards: Bill France Award of Excellence (2017); Texas Motorsports Hall of Fame (2017); NASCAR Hall of Fame (2021); 2003–2017 Cup Series Most Popular Driver (15 times); 1999 Busch Series Most Popular Driver; Named one of NASCAR's 75 Greatest Drivers (2023)

NASCAR Cup Series career
- 631 races run over 19 years
- Best finish: 3rd (2003)
- First race: 1999 Coca-Cola 600 (Charlotte)
- Last race: 2017 Ford EcoBoost 400 (Homestead)
- First win: 2000 DirecTV 500 (Texas)
- Last win: 2015 Quicken Loans Race for Heroes 500 (Phoenix)
Wins	Top tens	Poles
26	260	15

NASCAR O'Reilly Auto Parts Series career
- 147 races run over 28 years
- Best finish: 1st (1998, 1999)
- First race: 1996 Carolina Pride / Advance Auto Parts 250 (Myrtle Beach)
- Last race: 2024 Food City 300 (Bristol)
- First win: 1998 Coca-Cola 300 (Texas)
- Last win: 2016 ToyotaCare 250 (Richmond)
Wins	Top tens	Poles
24	96	10

Signature
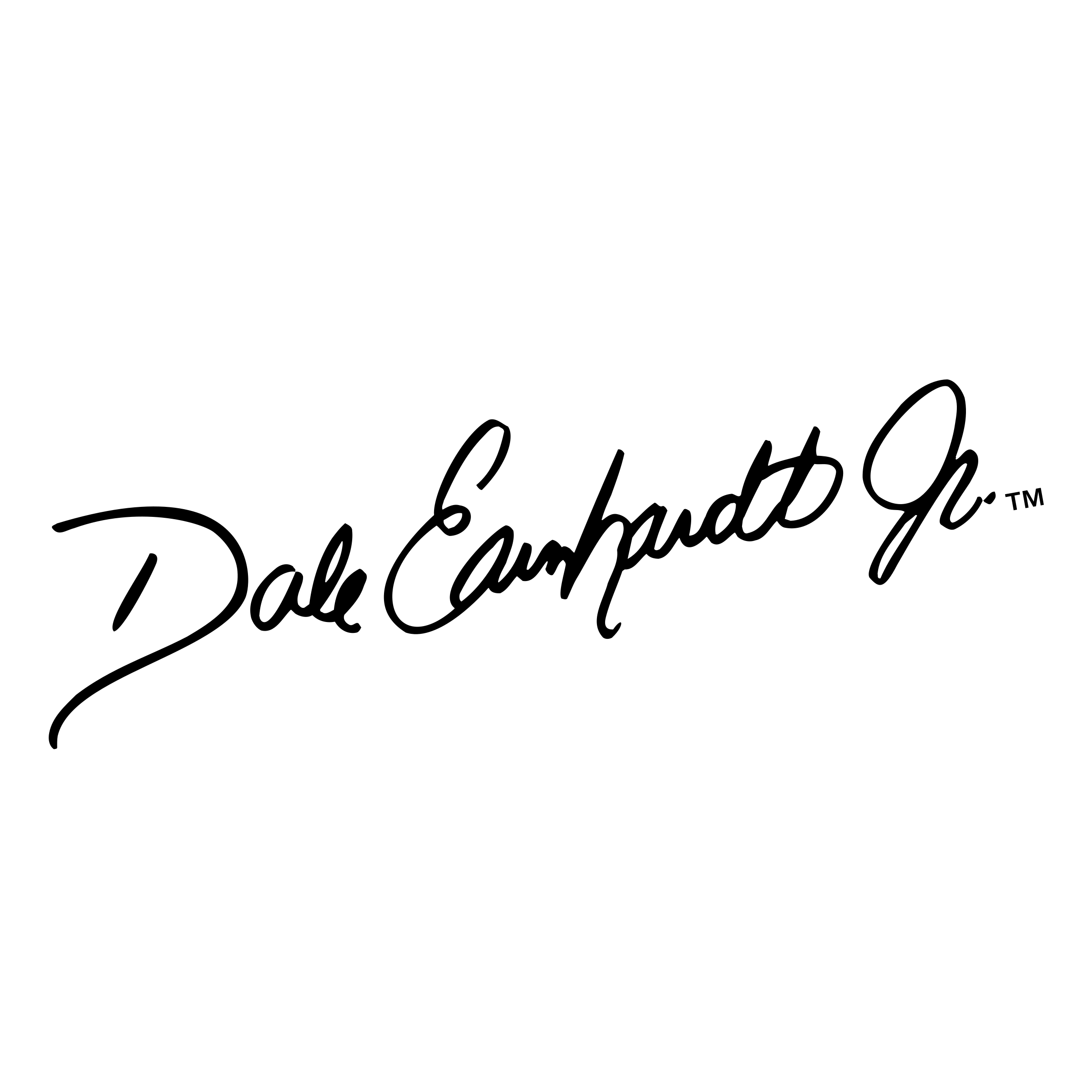
- Statistics up to date as of September 20, 2024.

Ralph Dale Earnhardt Jr. (born October 10, 1974), also known as "Dale Jr" or simply "Junior", is an American professional stock car racing driver, team owner, broadcaster for Amazon Prime Video and TNT Sports, podcaster, and businessman. A third-generation driver, he is the son of the late 7-time NASCAR Cup Series champion Dale Earnhardt and relative to many former and current drivers in the NASCAR ranks. Since retiring from full-time competition after the 2017 NASCAR Cup Series season, he has competed in select NASCAR Xfinity Series and CARS Late Model Stock Tour races, driving for JR Motorsports, a team of which he is a founder and co-owner of and which bears his namesake.

He became a color commentator for NASCAR on NBC in 2018 after retiring from driving full-time in NASCAR. After his contract with NBC expired after the 2023 season, he left for Amazon Prime Video and TNT Sports as part of new NASCAR coverage in NASCAR's next TV contract that began in 2025.

Earnhardt Jr. drove the No. 8 Budweiser-sponsored Chevrolet for Dale Earnhardt, Inc. (DEI), his father's team in the NASCAR Cup Series, from his debut in 1999 until 2007. In 2008, he moved to Hendrick Motorsports to drive their No. 88 car. He remained with Hendrick until his last season as a full-time driver in 2017. Earnhardt has 26 wins in the Cup Series, a total that ranks him tied (with Fred Lorenzen) for 33rd in NASCAR history as of April 2026. He is a two-time champion of the O'Reilly Auto Parts Series, winning in 1998 and 1999 when the series was known as the Busch Series.

Earnhardt's success at Daytona International Speedway and Talladega Superspeedway throughout his career earned him the nickname "the Pied Piper". He is a two-time Daytona 500 winner (2004 and 2014), and won NASCAR's Most Popular Driver Award fifteen consecutive times from 2003 to 2017.

== Early life and racing career ==
=== Early life and career ===
Dale Earnhardt Jr. was born and raised in Kannapolis, North Carolina, the son of Brenda Lorraine Jackson and Dale Earnhardt. His maternal grandfather, Robert Gee Sr., was a NASCAR car builder. He has an elder sister, Kelley; an elder half-brother, Kerry, from his father's first marriage; and a younger half-sister, Taylor Earnhardt-Putnam, from his father's third marriage. He is of part German ancestry. His parents divorced shortly after he was born, and he and Kelley lived with Brenda Earnhardt until their house was destroyed in a fire when he was six years old. As Brenda had no financial support after the fire, she gave up custody of the two children to Earnhardt Sr. prior to his marriage to Teresa Houston. During Dale Earnhardt Jr.'s childhood, Kelley took care of him while their father and stepmother were busy with the race seasons. At the age of twelve, he was sent to Oak Ridge Military Academy; three weeks later, Kelley quit high school to join him. He considered remaining at Oak Ridge for his senior year, but instead decided to attend Mooresville High School, from which he graduated in 1992.

Earnhardt Jr. attended the high performance driving school run by Andy Hillenburg and began his racing career at the late age of 17 with his father, competing in the Street Stock division at Concord, North Carolina's Motorsport Park. His first race car was a 1979 Monte Carlo that he co-owned with Kerry. By the age of nineteen, after two seasons of driving Street Stock Division, Earnhardt Jr. had honed his driving abilities to the point of joining the Late Model Stock Car Division. He competed on the North and South Carolina short tracks, driving a No. 3 Buick. While he did run various tracks during this time, Earnhardt Jr. primarily focused his efforts at the Myrtle Beach Speedway in South Carolina and the East Carolina Motor Speedway in Robersonville, North Carolina, where he captured the pole for the Greenville Merchants 300 on October 28, 1994. There, he developed an in-depth knowledge of chassis setup and car preparation, while racing against his siblings. He worked at his father's dealership as a mechanic while he went to Mitchell Community College to earn an associate degree in automotive technology.

Earnhardt Jr. ran nine Busch Series races between 1996 and 1997 for Dale Earnhardt, Inc., and Ed Whitaker, respectively, before driving for his father's team in the Busch Series full-time in 1998, in which he started the season with an amazing blow over after contact with Dick Trickle and Buckshot Jones at Daytona, on the same weekend that his father had his first and only Daytona 500 win. Earnhardt won consecutive NASCAR Busch Series Championships in 1998 and 1999, barely edging Matt Kenseth. In 1998, he made his first start in the Winston Cup Series, at the exhibition race held at the Twin Ring Motegi in Japan. Also in 1999, he drove in five Winston Cup races in the No. 8 Budweiser Chevrolet for DEI in preparation for a full-time Cup Series ride in 2000, with his best finish being a tenth place finish in at Richmond in the fall race.

=== 2000 ===
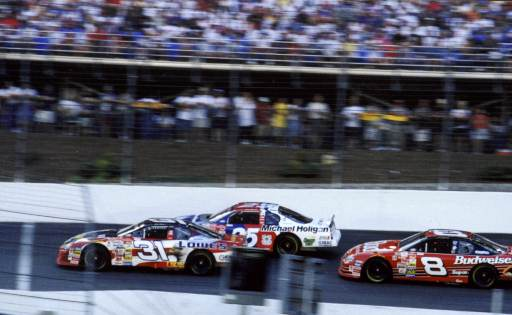
Earnhardt (far right) racing alongside Mike Skinner (far left) and Jerry Nadeau (left) at the 2000 Coca-Cola 600

The 2000 season was Earnhardt's breakout year in the Winston Cup Series. He competed for the Raybestos NASCAR Rookie of the Year Award in 2000. His primary competitor for the award was Matt Kenseth. Kenseth outran Earnhardt in the season-opening Daytona 500. Earnhardt scored his first win in the DirecTV 500 at Texas Motor Speedway, breaking the record held by his father Earnhardt Sr. for the fewest starts by a driver to earn his first victory in NASCAR's "modern era" by winning in his twelfth start, and also at Richmond International Raceway. He became the first rookie to win The Winston.

Earnhardt played a part in recreating one Winston Cup milestone in 2000 when he competed with his father and half-brother Kerry in the Pepsi 400 at Michigan International Speedway. That occasion was only the second time that a father had raced against two sons – Lee Petty and his two sons Richard and Maurice had previously accomplished the feat.

Earnhardt ended the 2000 season with two wins, three top-fives, five top-tens, and two poles.

=== 2001 ===
The season began with the 2001 Daytona 500 and on the final lap of the race, Earnhardt Jr. and his teammate Michael Waltrip competed for the win, with Jr eventually finishing second to Waltrip.

Behind the leading two cars, Earnhardt Jr's father had crashed into the outside wall of turn 4 after Sterling Marlin made contact with his left rear bumper. Earnhardt Sr. was pronounced dead at 5:16 pm due to a basilar skull fracture.

In the aftermath, many disgruntled fans sent death threats to Marlin and his family, blaming him for the crash; Earnhardt Jr. and Waltrip both requested that fans stop blaming anybody for Earnhardt Sr.'s death, and both the local police and NASCAR investigations into the crash cleared Marlin of any involvement. Earnhardt Jr. raced at Rockingham the following weekend but finished in 43rd place after a wreck on the first lap that looked eerily similar to his father's wreck.

Returning to Daytona for the Pepsi 400, Earnhardt Jr. made a comeback and had the dominant car of the race, leading 115 out of 160 laps. On the last restart, he managed to make a move from sixth to 1st-place in the span of two laps, with Waltrip holding off the field as Earnhardt Jr. took the checkered flag.

He won the MBNA Cal Ripken Jr. 400 at Dover, which was the first Winston Cup Series race following the September 11 attacks as the original scheduled race at New Hampshire Motor Speedway was postponed until the end of the season. After the race, he performed a Polish victory lap while holding a large American flag out the driver's side window.

In October, Earnhardt Jr. took his second restrictor plate win as he won the EA Sports 500 at Talladega, for which he also scored a Winston No Bull 5 $1 million bonus. He was docked 25 points, however, after his car failed post-race inspection. With this win, DEI swept three of the four restrictor plate races for 2001, only failing to win the spring Talladega race. He finished the 2001 season eighth in the points standings with three wins, nine top-fives, fifteen top-tens, and two poles.

=== 2002–2003 ===
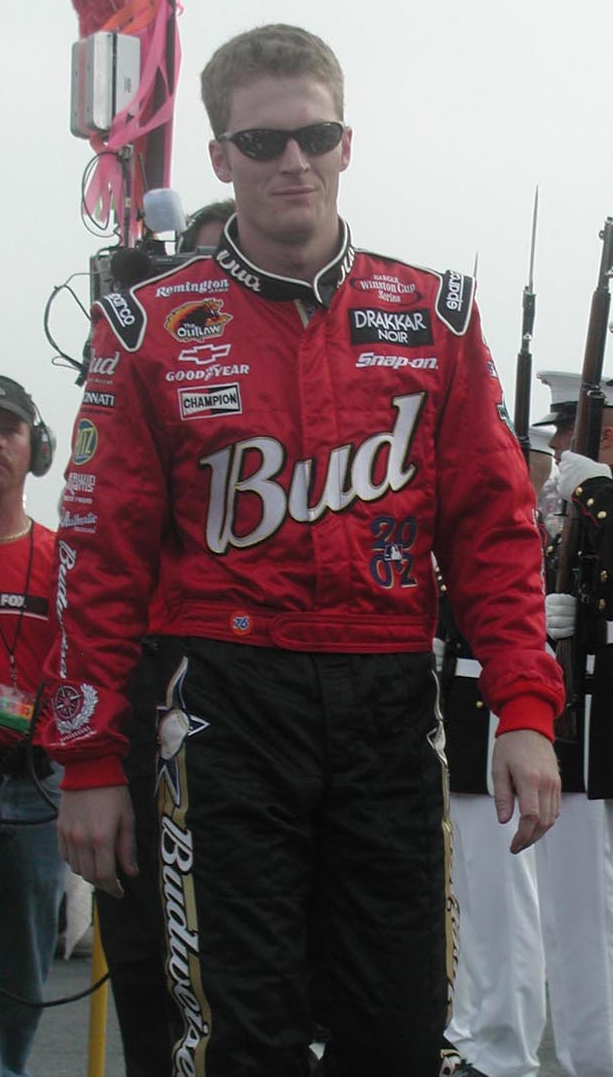
Earnhardt at the Pepsi 400 in 2002

In 2002, Earnhardt Jr. had a roller-coaster season. He struggled after enduring a concussion from a head-on collision to the outside wall at the California race in April – an injury he did not admit to until mid-September. In the three races following California, he finished no better than thirtieth. However, Earnhardt Jr. rallied to sweep both Talladega races (leading a dominating 133 of 188 laps in the spring race), a pair of Bud Pole Awards, and an eleventh-place finish in the points standings with eleven top-fives and sixteen top-ten's.

In 2003, Earnhardt Jr. became a true title contender, scoring a record-breaking fourth consecutive win at Talladega, after being involved in a 27-car crash on lap four. He struggled for most of the race and was at points a half-lap down, only catching back up to the pack through a caution. The win was controversial because with five laps to go, it appeared that Earnhardt went below the yellow line to gain position, but NASCAR ruled that Matt Kenseth had forced him below the line, making it a clean pass.

He later scored a victory at Phoenix in October, recording a career-best third-place effort in the point standings, with thirteen top-fives and 21 top-tens. He also took home the NMPA Most Popular Driver award for the first time in his career.

=== 2004–2006 ===
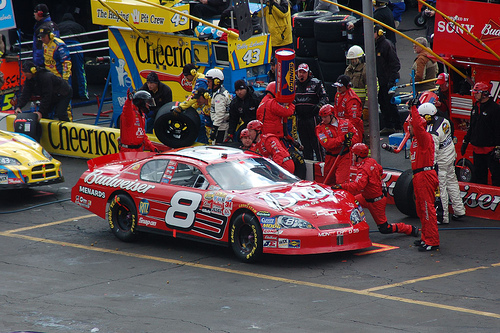
Earnhardt in the pits at the spring 2006 Bristol race

In 2004, Earnhardt won the Daytona 500, six years to the day after his father won his only title in the Great American Race (and three years after his father was killed in the 2001 race). Earnhardt came very close to sweeping Speedweeks, as in addition to the Daytona 500, he also won his Gatorade Duel and the Busch Series race. However, he finished second in the Budweiser Shootout to Dale Jarrett.

On July 18, during the summer off-weekend, Earnhardt crashed a Chevrolet Corvette C5-R during a practice for the American Le Mans Series Grand Prix of Sonoma at Infineon Raceway. The car slid off course and hit a concrete barrier during warm-up the day of the race, rupturing a fuel line and causing the car to burst into flames with him still inside. He suffered second and third-degree burns on his neck, chin, and legs, partially due to not wearing a protective balaclava with his helmet. The burns prevented him from finishing two races where he was relieved by Martin Truex Jr. (at New Hampshire) and his DEI teammate John Andretti (at Pocono) in the middle of the races. In the fall, Earnhardt became the first driver to sweep a weekend at Bristol by winning both the Busch and Nextel Cup races in the same weekend.

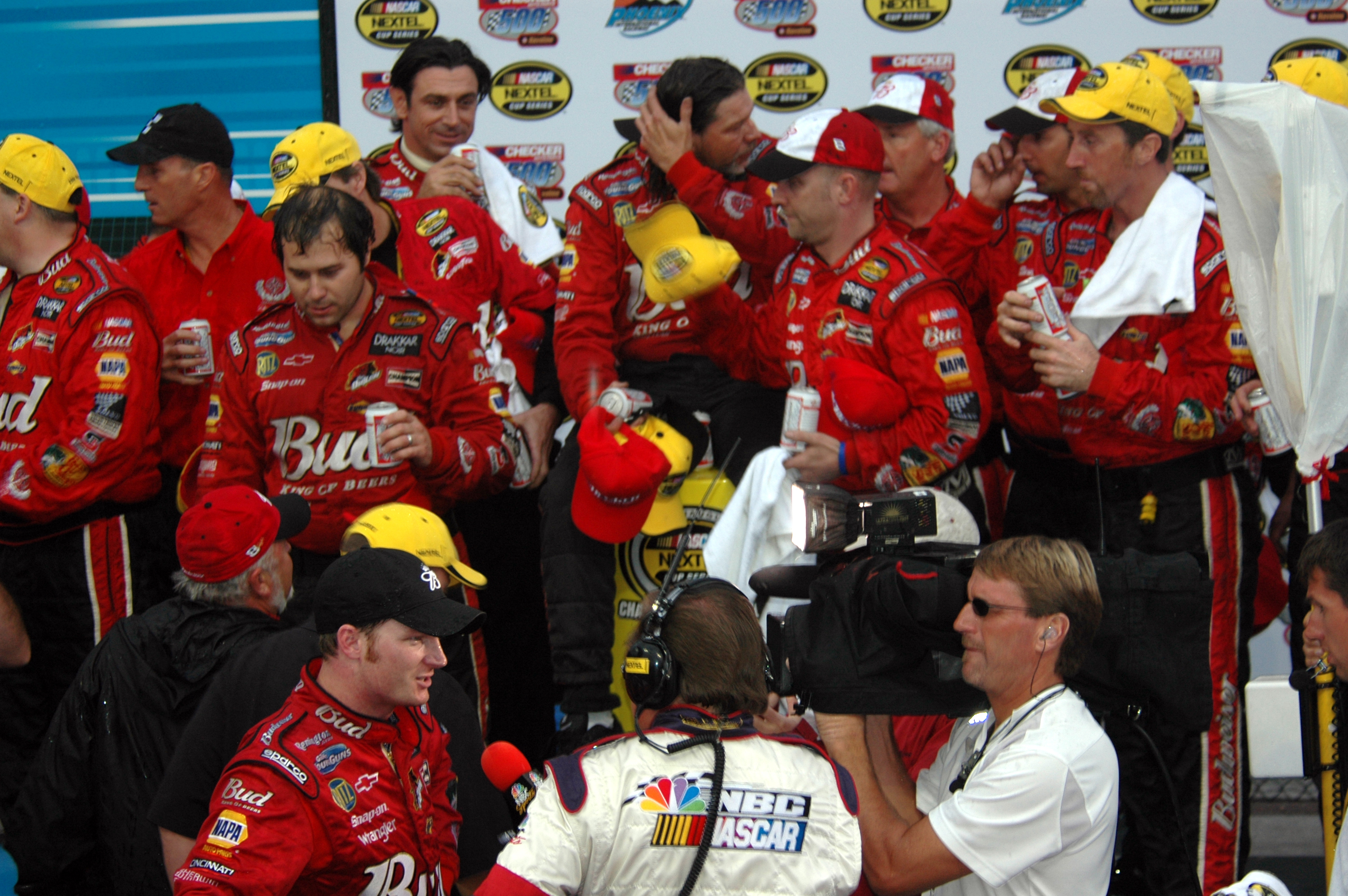
Earnhardt and his team in victory lane

Earnhardt was able to qualify for the NASCAR ten-race playoff and had his fifth NEXTEL Cup win of the season (a career high) at Talladega. However, he was penalized 25 points for the use of an obscenity during the television broadcast, in violation of a new NASCAR rule prohibiting participants from using obscene language (the rule had been created the week after the Daytona 500, in the wake of the Super Bowl half-time show controversy). That incident, combined with two consecutive DNFs in the Chase, eventually dropped him out of the running, and he finished fifth in the 2004 NEXTEL Cup Chase despite a career-high six wins at Daytona, Atlanta, Richmond, Bristol, Talladega and defending his fall win at Phoenix (though under the non-Chase points system, Earnhardt would have tied his third place points finish of the previous year). He closed off the 2004 season with six wins, sixteen top-fives, and 21 top-tens. He also picked up his second consecutive Most Popular Driver Award.

At the close of the 2004 season, it was revealed that Tony Eury Sr. would be promoted to the team manager position for the DEI corporation, while Tony Eury Jr. became the crew chief for Michael Waltrip for the 2005 season. Peter Rondeau, a Chance 2 employee who also helped Earnhardt win the Busch Series race at Bristol in August, became the crew chief for Earnhardt in 2005. Rondeau served as Earnhardt's crew chief until the Coca-Cola 600 weekend when he was replaced with DEI chief engineer Steve Hmiel, who helped Earnhardt score his lone win of 2005 at Chicagoland in July when he took the lead from Matt Kenseth on the last cycle of pit stops. Earnhardt was eliminated from any possible competition for the NEXTEL Cup championship after suffering an engine failure at the California Speedway. Earnhardt was reunited with his cousin, Tony Eury Jr., after the fall Richmond weekend, and results improved immediately. Earnhardt finished the season nineteenth in points. For the third straight year, he took home the NMPA Most Popular Driver Award.

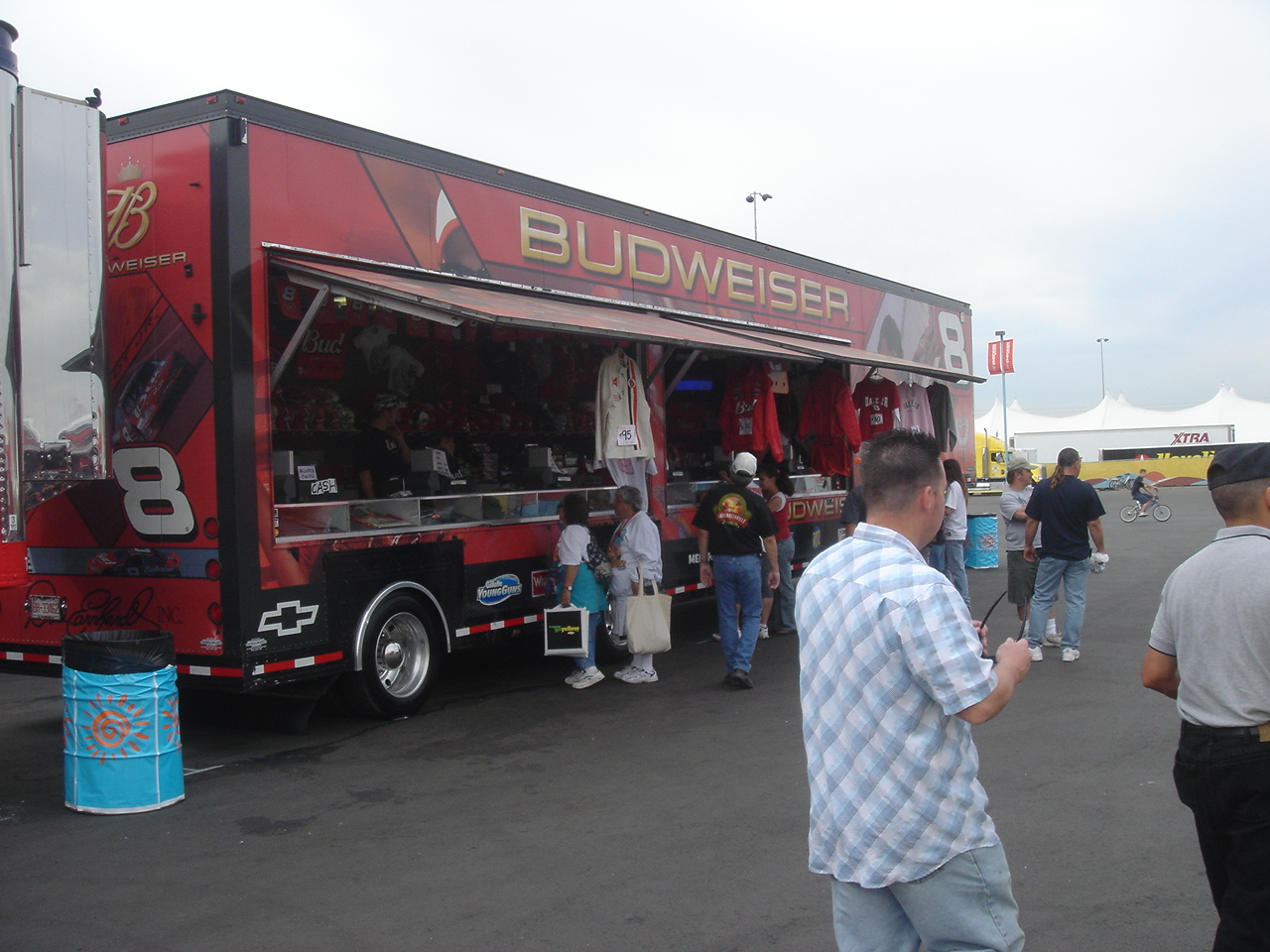
An Earnhardt merchandise hauler

Earnhardt's proficiency as a car owner continued. His race team outside of DEI, JR Motorsports, in 2005 fielded a car in the USAR Hooters ProCup Series, winning once and qualifying for the Four Champions playoff. Mark McFarland moved to the Busch Series in 2006, driving the No. 88 JR Motorsports US Navy Chevrolet, with Richard Childress Racing providing assistance; however, he was fired before the fall Michigan race, the Carfax 250. He was replaced by Robby Gordon and Martin Truex Jr. for the rest of the year. Long-time short track racer Shane Huffman drove Earnhardt's USAR Hooters ProCup car in 2006. In 2006, during the spring weekend at Talladega Superspeedway, Earnhardt and other DEI drivers drove with special black paint schemes on their cars, reminiscent of his late father's famous No. 3 paint scheme. On Father's Day in 2006, he drove a vintage Budweiser car at Michigan International Speedway to honor both his grandfather (Ralph Earnhardt) and his father, who at one point in both their careers used the No. 8 car. After rain caused the race to be ended early, Earnhardt finished third with Kasey Kahne winning the race. After seventeen races in the 2006 season, Earnhardt sat third in the championship standings with one win, coming at Richmond in May 2006.

During the race at New Hampshire, he experienced the second engine failure of his 2006 season, ultimately leading to a 43rd-place finish. Following New Hampshire was the race at Pocono, where he was running in the middle of the pack when he crashed in turn 2. These two events catapulted him to 11th place in the points standings, out of the Chase for the Cup. At Indianapolis Motor Speedway, Earnhardt and his crew made a critical decision to stay out on the final pit stop to get a much-needed top-ten finish to move him up to 10th in the points. He made the 2006 Chase for the NEXTEL Cup after finishing seventeenth in the Chevy Rock and Roll 400 at Richmond International Raceway on September 9, 2006. He came close to winning at Talladega and was leading on the last lap when Brian Vickers made contact with Earnhardt's future teammate Jimmie Johnson, sending Johnson into Earnhardt and spinning both of them out. His points position going into the Chase was sixth. He finished the season fifth in the point standings, 147 points behind leader Jimmie Johnson.

=== 2007: Final season at DEI ===
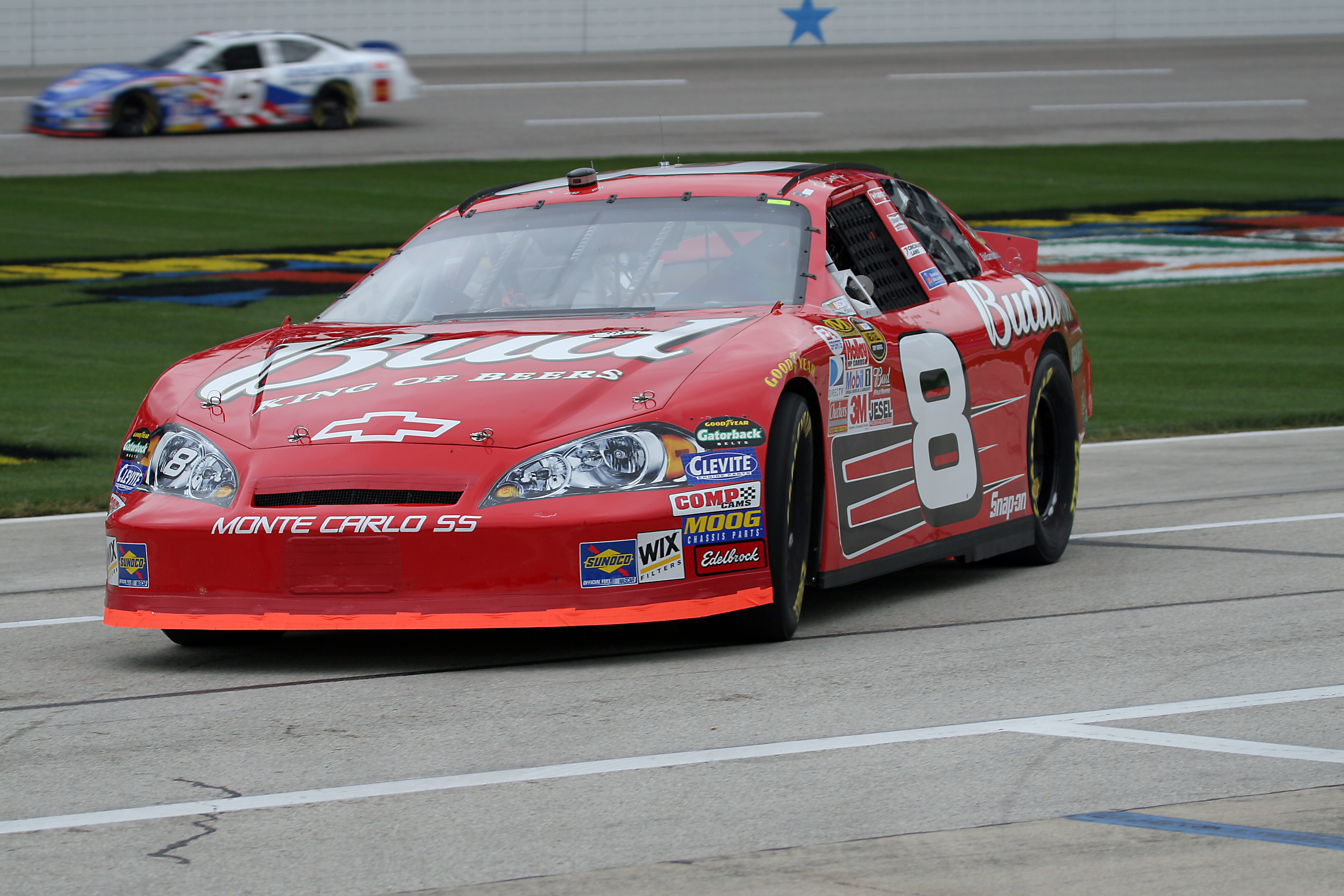
Earnhardt turning into the garage at Texas Motor Speedway in 2007

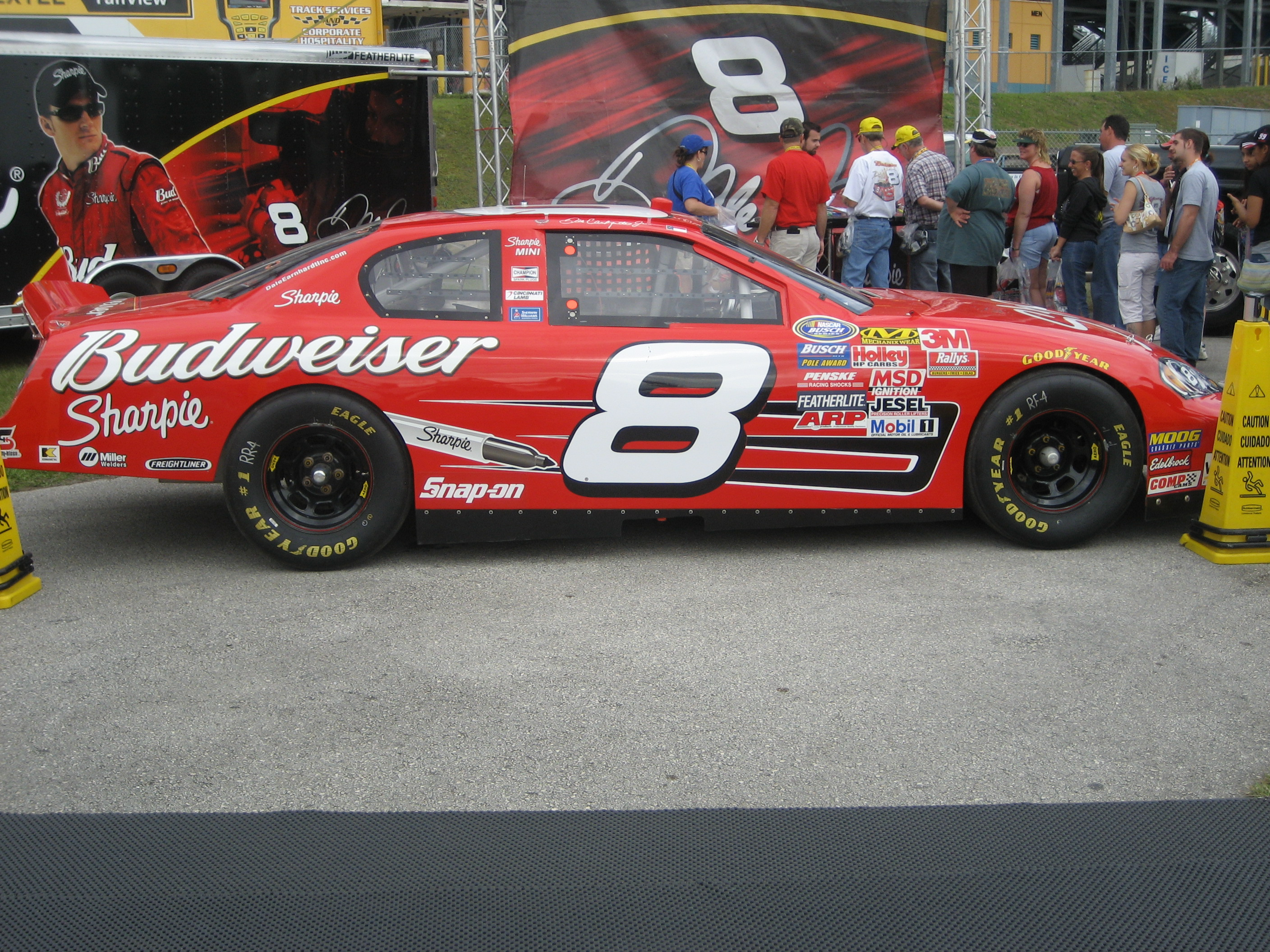
Dale Jr.'s No. 8 Sharpie Busch car at the Sharpie display at the 2007 Ford Championship Weekend at Homestead

Earnhardt began the 2007 NASCAR Nextel Cup Series season by finishing 32nd at the Daytona 500 as a result of a late race crash. His first top-ten came at Bristol Motor Speedway in the Food City 500, where he finished seventh. His first top-five came at Martinsville Speedway in the Goody's Cool Orange 500. He led 136 laps and finished fifth. He collected his third top-ten of the season and his eighth at Talladega Superspeedway with his seventh place performance in the 2007 Aaron's 499. On May 14, 2007, he was docked one hundred driver championship points, car owner Teresa Earnhardt was docked 100 owner points, and his crew chief, Tony Eury Jr., was fined $100,000 and suspended for six races due to the use of illegal mounting brackets used to attach the wing to his car. During the April race at Texas Motor Speedway he drove the last 10 laps in the No. 5 car of Kyle Busch owned by Rick Hendrick.

On May 27, 2007, Earnhardt rode a camouflage No. 8 car in the Coca-Cola 600 on Memorial Day to raise money for the families of military troops. Jeff Gordon, Jimmie Johnson, Greg Biffle, Mark Martin, Ward Burton, Denny Hamlin, Casey Mears, Shane Huffman, and Bill Elliott also changed their paint schemes for the occasion. He finished 8th, after leading with seven laps to go, but he had to pit for fuel and Casey Mears finished with the win.

On August 5, 2007, Earnhardt earned his first pole position in a race since 2002 at Pocono Raceway. Although Kurt Busch won the race, Earnhardt had a dramatic comeback to finish second after spinning out and experiencing shocking troubles. Earnhardt led for eight laps before Busch took over. On August 12 at Watkins Glen International, Earnhardt was making the push into the top-twelve of the Nextel Cup standings from his No. 13 position. After being in the No. 2 position during the race, Earnhardt had engine problems on lap 64 and had to end his race day. After the Glen, he tried furiously to reach the twelfth spot in the standings. However, a resurgence by Kurt Busch and a blown engine during the final race at Richmond ended his Chase hopes. That was his last chance to participate in the Championship at Dale Earnhardt, Inc. (DEI). After the 2007 season, Dale Jr. won the NMPA Chex Most Popular Driver award for the fifth consecutive time.

After the season, Earnhardt, who had always been fascinated with Australian V8 Supercars, test drove the cars on vacation in Australia.

=== Move to Hendrick Motorsports ===
After much speculation, Earnhardt announced on May 10, 2007, that he would leave Dale Earnhardt Inc., the company founded by his father, to drive for another team in 2008. Earnhardt expressed that his decision was based entirely on his desire to achieve his career goal of a Sprint Cup Championship, and his apparent belief that he would not be able to attain that objective while driving for DEI. He said that unless he could gain majority ownership, and therefore control, of DEI, he was not confident in the organization's ability to field the elite-level equipment that would yield the elusive title.

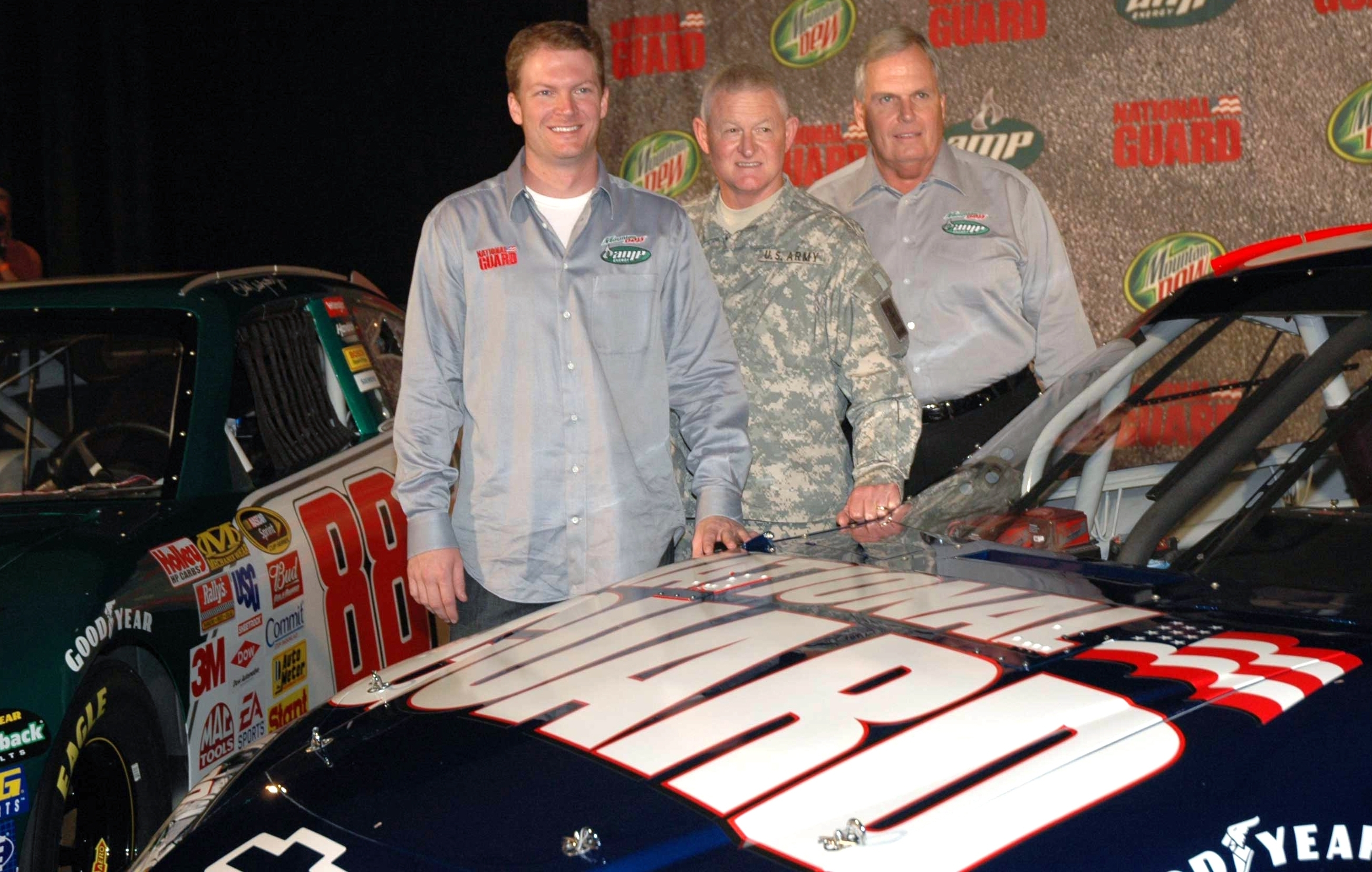
Dale Earnhardt Jr. (left) standing between two different paint schemes for the No. 88 Chevy, with Lt. Gen. Clyde A. Vaughn, director of the Army National Guard, and Rick Hendrick, in Dallas, where the announcement was made on September 19, 2007

On June 13, 2007, he announced at a press conference that he had signed a five-year contract with Hendrick Motorsports, replacing Kyle Busch. At the time, Hendrick consisted of Jeff Gordon, Jimmie Johnson, and Casey Mears. One month later, on July 13, 2007, it was announced that his long-time primary sponsor Budweiser would not be with Earnhardt when he made the move to Hendrick. Other contractual agreements in place at Hendrick Motorsports are said to have prevented a relationship with Bud. Due to a previous friendship between team owner Rick Hendrick and Earnhardt's father, Earnhardt later said that going to drive for Hendrick almost felt like driving for a second family team.

On August 15, 2007, it was announced that Earnhardt would not be taking his familiar No. 8 with him to Hendrick Motorsports in 2008. His late grandfather, Ralph Earnhardt, used that number, while Earnhardt picked it when he entered the Cup Series in 1999. His father also used No. 8 early in his career. Earnhardt Jr. blamed his stepmother for not allowing the No. 8 to move with him to Hendrick Motorsports. Earnhardt said negotiations broke down when Teresa Earnhardt asked for part of the licensing revenue, along with wanting the number back after he retired. (The No. 8 team, after a successful season in 2008 with co-drivers Mark Martin and Aric Almirola, would end up being shut down in 2009 after DEI's merger with Ganassi Racing).

Earnhardt moved to the No. 88 car with Tony Eury Jr. coming to Hendrick to remain as his crew chief. On September 19, 2007, the official announcement was made that Earnhardt would be driving the No. 88 Mountain Dew AMP/National Guard Chevrolet Impala for the 2008 season.

The No. 88, according to NASCAR archives, was driven by Ralph Earnhardt, his paternal grandfather, in 1957. His maternal grandfather, Robert Gee, was one of the first employees of All Star Racing, initially a Late Model Sportsman (now Xfinity Series) team with Gee as Hendrick's partner, which is now Hendrick Motorsports. Hendrick said about Earnhardt and his uncles, "I can look at Robert Gee Jr., or Jimmy Gee, or Dale Jr. and all I see is Robert Gee. They're the spitting image of him. I go back and look at pictures from when we did things together, and I have to say, I owe Robert a lot." Starting in the 2008 season, Hendrick Motorsports merged its Nationwide Series team to Earnhardt's JR Motorsports, with the cars coming from Earnhardt's shop, which employs his mother and uncles.

=== 2008 ===
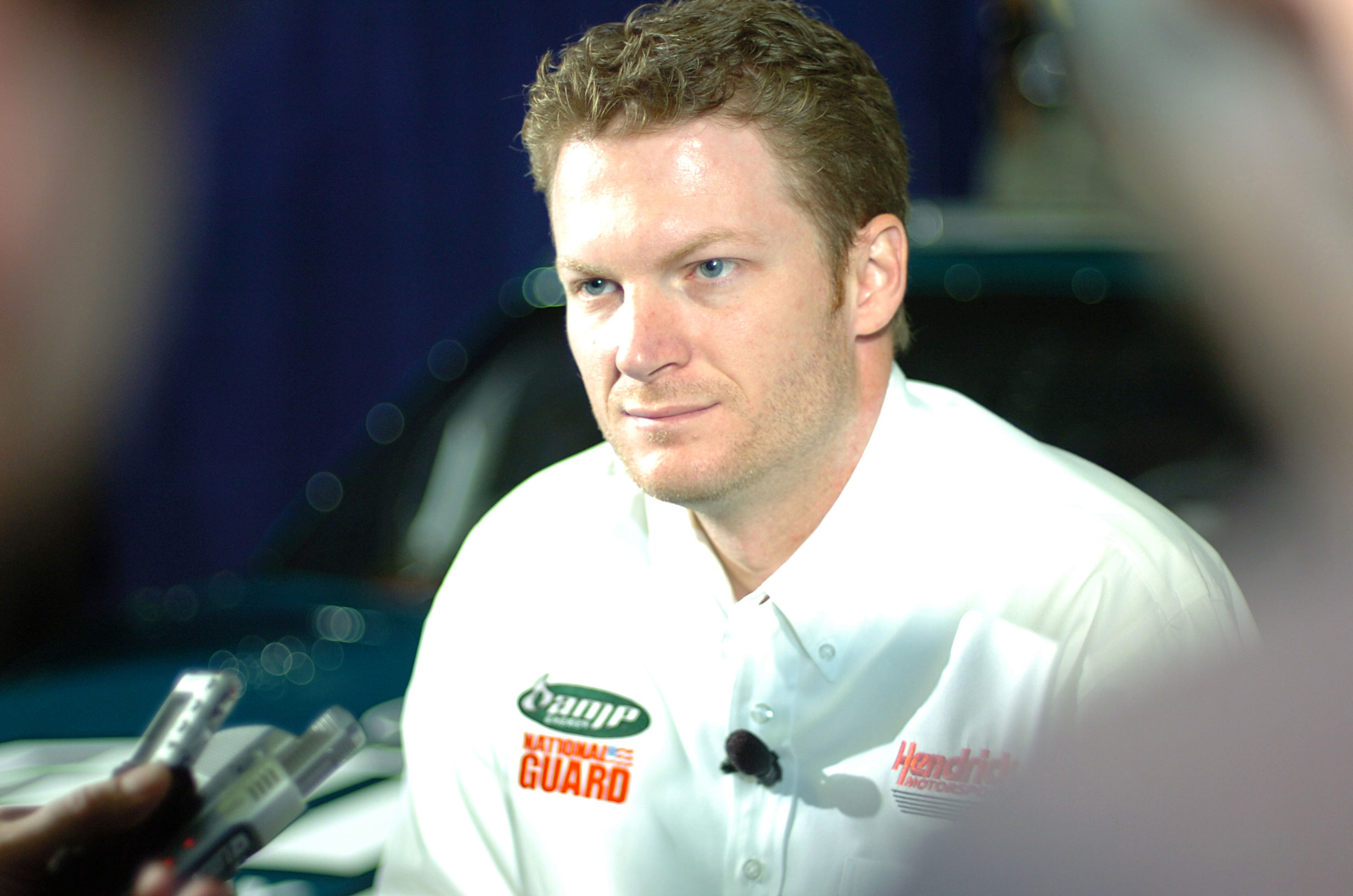
Earnhardt addresses the media at Hendrick Motorsports headquarters on January 23, 2008

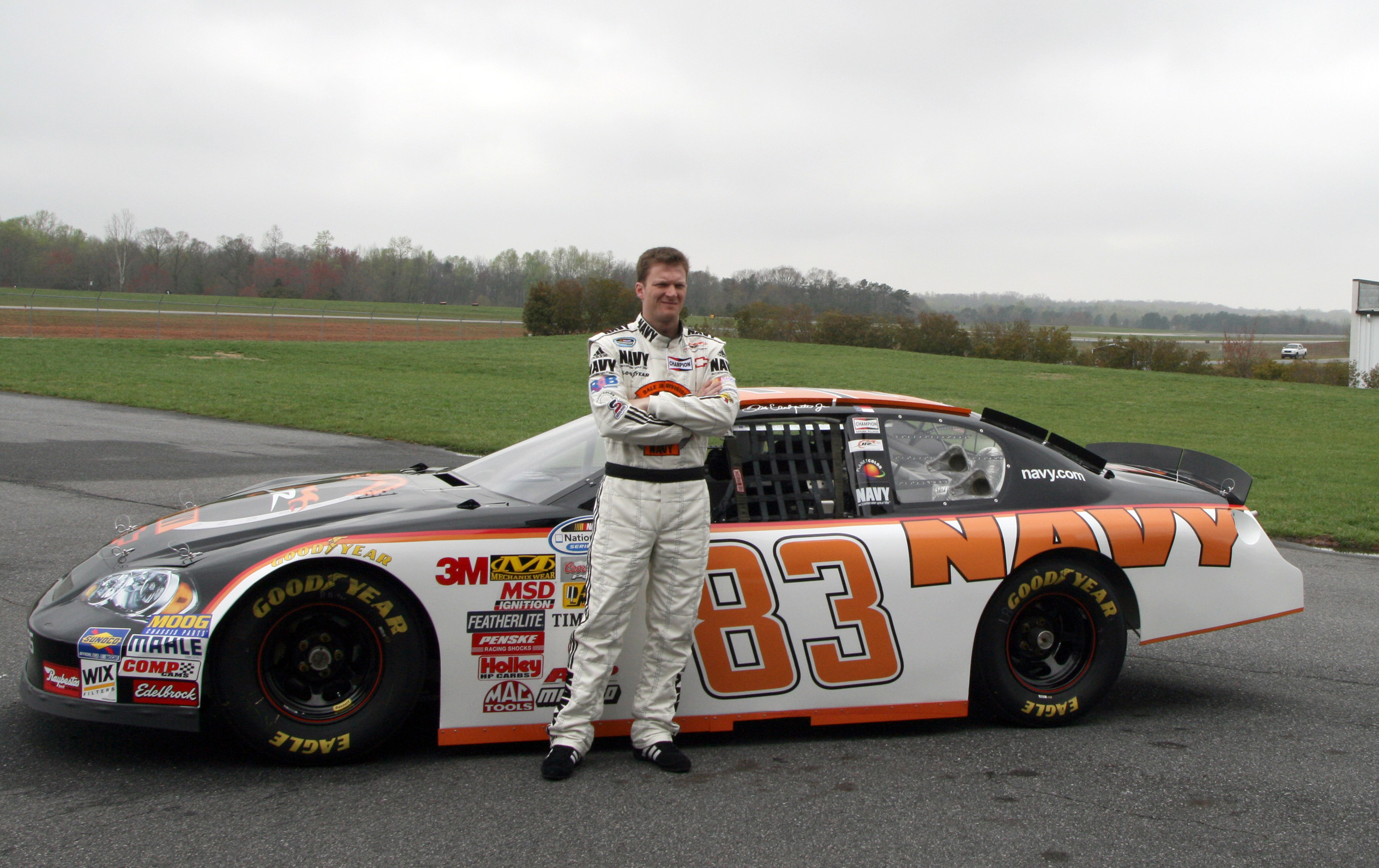
Earnhardt Jr. and the No. 83 NAVY Chevrolet in the 2008 NASCAR Nationwide Series.

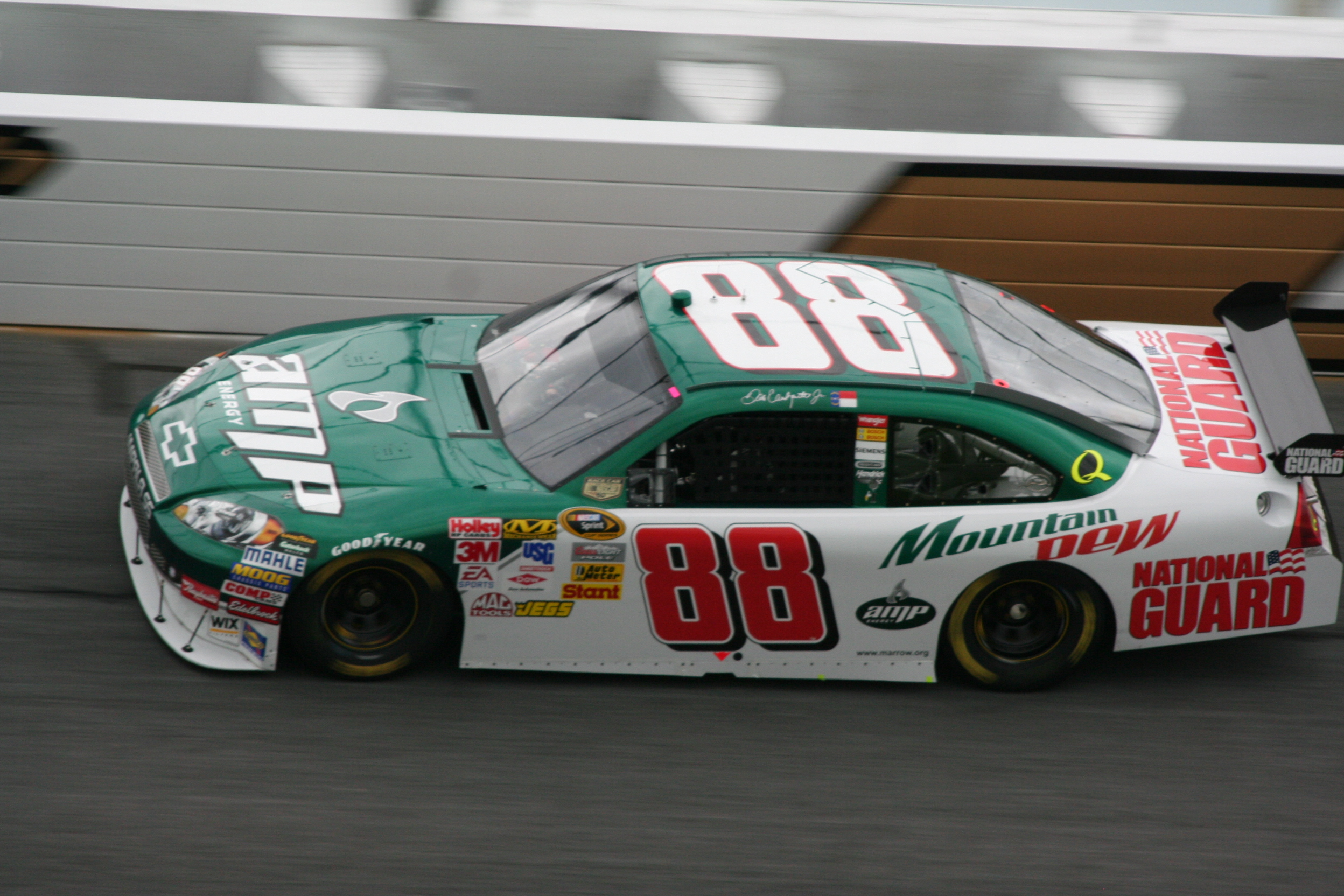
Earnhardt Jr at Daytona

Earnhardt started the 2008 season by winning the Budweiser Shootout, a non-points-paying exhibition. It was his first race for Hendrick. He led for a total of 47 out of seventy laps, a Budweiser Shootout record. He followed that up five days later with a win in the first of the Gatorade Duels. This was his third career win in the duels, however, he was unable to follow it up with victory in the Daytona 500, finishing ninth. Ryan Newman was the winner of the event.

Earnhardt was docked fifty points because his rear spoiler did not meet the specified height in the Nationwide Series. His crew chief Chad Walter was fined $35,000, suspended for six races, and placed on probation until December 31, 2008. Team owner Rick Hendrick was also docked fifty owner points along with Earnhardt.

At Michigan, Earnhardt broke his 76-race winless streak, managing to stretch his fuel mileage enough to allow him to win under a caution on the last lap of a green-white-checkered (overtime) finish. He did not find much success after the Michigan win. He then went back to Talladega Superspeedway for the AMP Energy 500, where he was en route to a possible win before being caught up in "The Big One" late in the race. He headed to Martinsville Speedway, where he finished 2nd to teammate Jimmie Johnson. He ended the season in the garage area at Homestead in The Ford 400 after losing his brakes with just a few laps to go in the race. Earnhardt finished the season 12th in points, 557 points behind champion Jimmie Johnson.

=== 2009 ===
In the season-opening Daytona 500, Earnhardt began well, even leading for a lap. However, multiple misfortunes, including a missed pit stop and a one-lap penalty for pitting outside of his pit box, sent him far into the back of the running order. Earnhardt was then directly involved in a controversial crash on lap 124, when, while fighting to return to the lead lap, he came in contact with Brian Vickers while fighting to be the first driver one lap down (who gets a free pass should the caution flag come out), causing a 10-car pileup which included Denny Hamlin, Scott Speed, Jimmie Johnson, Kyle and Kurt Busch, Robby Gordon, Jamie McMurray, and Carl Edwards. Vickers and Kyle Busch later criticized Earnhardt, who denied purposely clipping Vickers. Earnhardt criticized Vickers for blocking him on the inside. The race concluded early due to the rain, and Earnhardt officially finished 27th. He later apologized for his actions but maintained that he never intended to wreck Vickers.

After a blown engine at California and falling to 35th in owners' points, he finished 10th at Las Vegas and reached 29th place in points. He finished 8th at Martinsville. He had a string of poor finishes, including 20th at Texas and 31st at Phoenix after being spun out by Casey Mears. He gained confidence in his team with a very strong performance at Talladega, leading for twenty laps, and finishing second to his protege Brad Keselowski after Keselowski sent Edwards flying into the catch fence. However, two weeks later at Richmond, Earnhardt finished 27th. He was again spun out late in the race at Darlington and ended the race in 27th place. He then finished 10th in the All-Star race at Lowe's Motor Speedway.

Earnhardt's poor performance continued as he finished 40th at the Coca-Cola 600 due to an ill-handling race car, after which Tony Eury Jr. was fired as his crew chief on May 28, 2009. Lance McGrew was named interim crew chief starting with the June 2009 race at Pocono, with team manager Brian Whitesell calling the shots at Dover the previous week. Earnhardt finished twelfth at Dover for the Autism Speaks 400 with McGrew as his crew chief after contending for the lead. At Pocono Raceway, however, he again ended with a 27th-place finish. Earnhardt improved thereafter following the change, finishing fifteenth at Chicagoland Speedway, though he had one DNF at Daytona International Speedway after being taken out of the race early in a large pileup.

At the Carfax 400 at Michigan, Earnhardt charged to the front near the end of the race and finished third; he also earned his second top-five finish this season in the same race. Earnhardt finished ninth in the Sharpie 500 a week later at Bristol, but his bad luck continued at the Auto Club Speedway when he was involved in a multi-car incident. After a 39th qualifying run at Lowe's Motor Speedway, he said "I'm about to the end of my rope". At the fall Talladega race, Earnhardt had a solid run, including leading several laps, before finishing in eleventh place. Lance McGrew had the "interim" taken off of his title, and he continued working with the No. 88 team through the end of the 2010 season. Earnhardt ended 2009 winless, scoring two top-fives, five top-tens, an average finish of 23.3, and finished a career low 25th in points.

=== 2010 ===
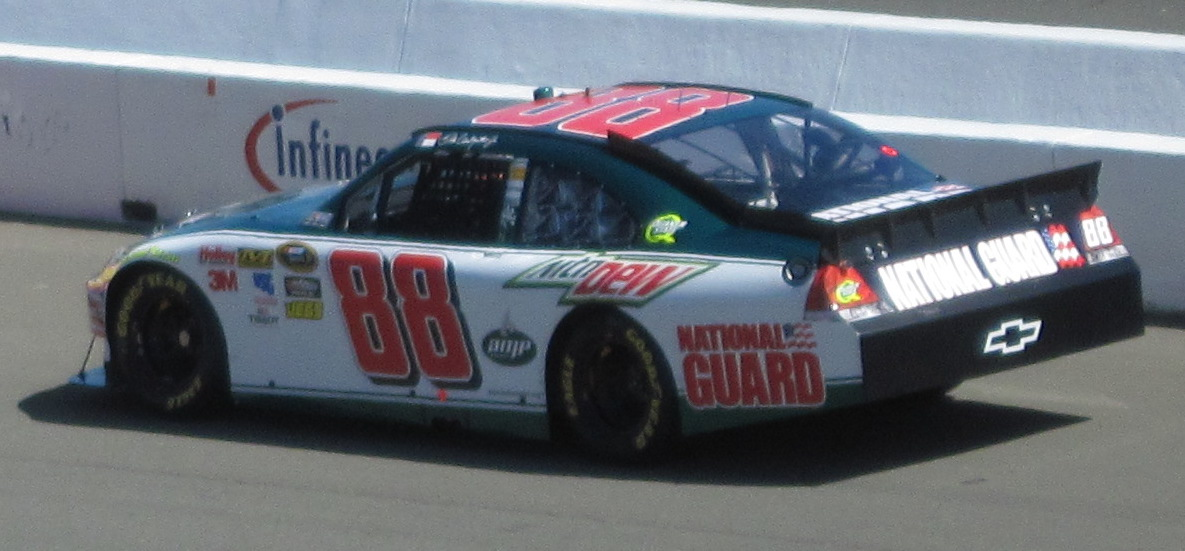
Earnhardt during the 2010 Toyota/Save Mart 350

On February 6, 2010, Earnhardt qualified second overall for the 52nd Daytona 500 after losing the pole position to teammate Mark Martin. He started first in the Gatorade Duel No. 2 on February 11 of that year. He finished eleventh in the 2010 Budweiser Shootout after struggling with an ill-handling car for most of the race.

On February 13, 2010, while running in the front of the pack at the Daytona Nationwide Series race, Earnhardt was caught up in a multi-car wreck, causing his car to flip upside down on the backstretch. He walked away from the wreck uninjured. His driver, Danica Patrick, was caught up in another wreck before Earnhardt flipped. The next day, during the Daytona 500, Earnhardt made a late charge to the front of the pack. After restarting tenth with two laps to go, Earnhardt used four fresh tires and a series of aggressive moves to make his way to second on the final lap, but his bid for victory was foiled by Jamie McMurray as Earnhardt finished second. Earnhardt enjoyed a hot start to the year, qualifying well in the season's first two months and winning the pole for the spring race at Atlanta Motor Speedway in March. He finished fifteenth in the race and stayed within Chase for the Sprint Cup contention for much of the season's first half.

In a year defined by inconsistency, however, Earnhardt scored only two additional Top 5 finishes after the Daytona 500: a 4th-place result at the Coke Zero 400, and an additional 4th-place finish at New Hampshire Motor Speedway in September. He wrapped up the year with eight top-tens and a 21st-place finish in points. Hendrick Motorsports did a major crew chief shuffle following the season, pairing Earnhardt's crew chief McGrew with Mark Martin, while Gordon's crew chief, Steve Letarte, moved to the No. 88 team, and Gordon inherited Martin's crew chief, Alan Gustafson.

Earnhardt's Nationwide Series results offered more optimism in 2010. On July 2, Earnhardt raced a blue-and-yellow No. 3 Wrangler Chevrolet (painted to pay tribute to his father and fans) and drove it to victory lane in the Nationwide Series' Subway Jalapeño 250 at Daytona. On December 2, 2010, it was announced that Earnhardt won the NMPA Most Popular Driver award for the eighth consecutive time.

=== 2011 ===
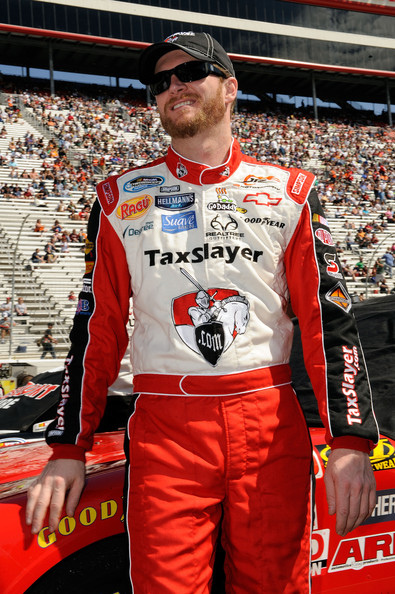
Earnhardt at Bristol

He began the season by drawing the pole position at the 2011 Budweiser Shootout, where he finished nineteenth in the race. On February 13, he earned his first pole position at Daytona International Speedway, as well as his first at a track that uses restrictor plates. Due to a practice crash, he had to start at the back of the field for both the duel race and the 500. He finished 24th in the Daytona 500 after being wrecked with four laps to go. Over the next seven races, Earnhardt would achieve five top-ten finishes, including a second place finish at Martinsville after losing the lead to Kevin Harvick with four laps to go, and a fourt -place finish at Talladega in a photo finish with Jimmie Johnson, Jeff Gordon, Mark Martin, Clint Bowyer, and Kevin Harvick. Earnhardt came within half a lap of snapping his then-104 race winless streak at the Coca-Cola 600 at the Charlotte Motor Speedway, when he ran out of fuel during a green-white-checkered finish, finishing seventh. The following week at Kansas, Earnhardt finished 2nd to Brad Keselowski. He followed this up with a solid 6th-place finish at Pocono. Over the course of the next three races, Earnhardt would slide to seventh in the Championship points, finishing 21st at Michigan, 41st at Infineon, and 19th at Daytona. On September 1, 2011, Earnhardt announced he had signed a five-year contract extension with Hendrick Motorsports to drive the No. 88 until 2017. On September 19, 2011, Earnhardt made his first Chase for the Sprint Cup appearance since 2008 at Chicagoland. At the season finale at Homestead, he finished eleventh and finished seventh in the final points standings. On December 1, 2011, it was announced that Earnhardt won the Most Popular Driver award for the ninth consecutive time.

=== 2012 ===
Earnhardt started eighth in the Budweiser Shootout, led for several laps, and finished twentieth after being caught up in a six-car crash on lap 55 that also involved Matt Kenseth, Joey Logano, and Kevin Harvick. In the Gatorade Duel, Earnhardt performed strongly, starting on the outside pole in the first duel race. He led a few laps in the early part of the race before finishing 2nd to Tony Stewart after his Nationwide Series teammate Danica Patrick smashed hard into the inside wall in a last-lap crash on the back straightaway. In the postponed Daytona 500, he finished 2nd behind Matt Kenseth, after passing Greg Biffle on the last lap. At Phoenix, Earnhardt's car struggled most of the race and came out with a 14th-place finish.

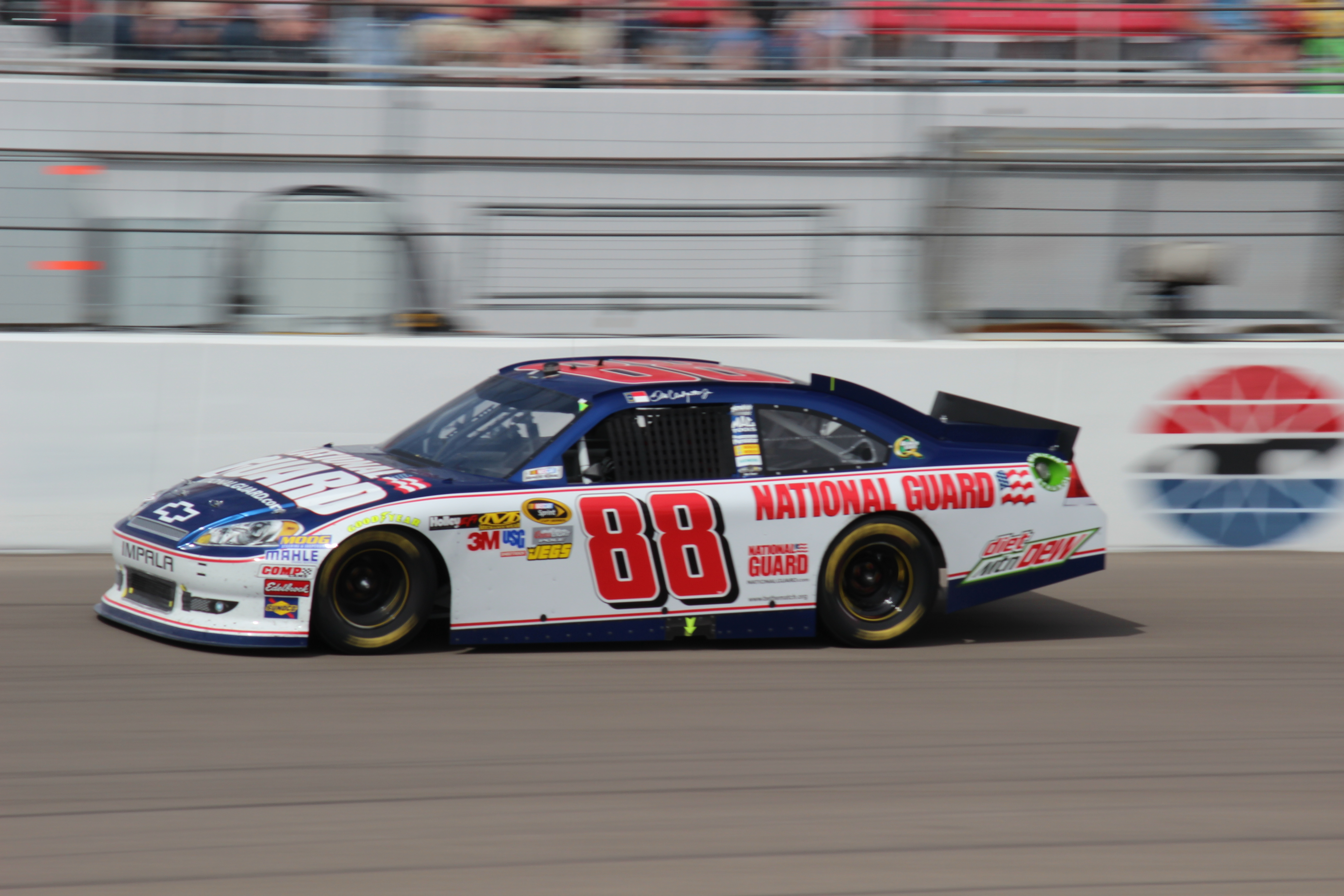
Dale Jr. competing in the 2012 Kobalt Tools 400.

At Las Vegas, Earnhardt led seventy laps early but finished tenth based on a bad pit strategy. At Bristol, Earnhardt finished 15th following a late race contact with teammate Jeff Gordon and a speeding penalty. Earnhardt would back this up with a pair of back-to-back third-place finishes at Auto Club and Martinsville Speedway, leaving him second in the standings.

In the following weeks, Earnhardt would bring a string of top-tens: tenth at Texas, seventh at Kansas, second at Richmond, and ninth at Talladega, where he led ten laps. The following week, Earnhardt struggled for most of the race at Darlington and had to settle for a seventeenth-place finish. At the All-Star Race, Earnhardt won the Sprint Showdown, leading all 40 laps to race his way into the big event. In the event, Earnhardt won the 4th segment and in the final ten-lap shootout, had to settle for a fifth-place finish. In the following two weeks, Earnhardt would post finishes of sixth at Charlotte and fourth at Dover heading into the summer months. At the newly-repaved Pocono Raceway, Earnhardt led 36 laps during the race but made a late race fuel pit stop from third place with just over twenty laps to go, finishing eighth and standing second in points. At the 2012 Quicken Loans 400 at Michigan, Earnhardt dominated the race, leading 95 laps, and won, snapping a 143-race winless streak, almost four years to the day after his last win on June 15, 2008. Earnhardt would suffer a 23rd-place finish at Sonoma after being wrecked in a green-white-checkered finish, but was still able to cross the finish line intact and on the lead lap, continuing his streak of being the only driver to finish all races on the lead lap. He would back this up with a fourth-place finish in the Quaker State 400 at Kentucky Speedway.

The following week at Daytona, a last-lap crash resulted in a fifteenth-place finish for Earnhardt, but he still kept his streak of being the only driver to finish every single lap in every race. Earnhardt backed up with a couple of top-five finishes, finishing fourth at both Loudon and Indianapolis, where he gained the points lead for the first time since 2004 after points leader Matt Kenseth was taken out in a late-race crash. Back at Pocono, Earnhardt was running in the second position, but a break in the transmission sent the 88 to the garage. But he came back out eighteen laps down and finished 32nd, due to rain that came and ended the race and a late race wreck involving Jimmie Johnson, Matt Kenseth, and Denny Hamlin. His streak of completing on the lead lap came to an end, but he still maintained the points lead with five races until the chase cutoff. At Watkins Glen, Earnhardt had a steady top-ten going in the final laps, but a late race spin resulted in a 28th-place finish, which would drop the No. 88 team from first to fourth in the points.

Returning to Michigan for the Pure Michigan 400, Earnhardt had to start in 42nd place after a crash in practice forced him to move to a backup car. He led for a number of laps mid-race and finished on the lead lap in 4th place. Earnhardt, Ryan Newman and Kasey Kahne also escaped engine difficulties that plagued Jimmie Johnson, Jeff Gordon, and Tony Stewart. At Bristol Motor Speedway, Earnhardt started 16th after a qualifying rainout; he led thirteen laps in the race before pit road penalties resulted in a twelfth-place finish. The finish locked him into the 2012 Chase for the Sprint Cup, alongside Greg Biffle and teammate Jimmie Johnson. At Atlanta Motor Speedway, Earnhardt went a lap down early but recovered to earn a seventh-place finish. The following week at Richmond International Raceway, Earnhardt earned his first pole of the season. He would go on to lead 69 laps, but a late race pit stop resulted in the 88 team getting a fourteenth place finish, and being seeded seventh in the standings. In the first race of the chase at Chicagoland Speedway, Earnhardt finished eighth despite having to start at the rear of the field due to an engine change. Finishes of thirteenth and eleventh at Loudon and Dover left the 88 team seventh in the standings.

==== Concussion ====
On the morning of October 11, 2012, Hendrick Motorsports announced that Earnhardt would have to sit out the Bank of America 500 at Charlotte and the Hollywood Casino 400 at Kansas due to a concussion from a 25-car crash on the last lap at Talladega on October 7, 2012. That weekend, Earnhardt finished 20th at Talladega when he took a hard lick in a crash after making contact with Bobby Labonte. Prior to this, Earnhardt had suffered a concussion during an August 29 test at Kansas Speedway. Regan Smith was announced to replace him at those two races. Prior to the concussion, Earnhardt had competed in 461 consecutive races, dating back to the 1999 Atlanta event. The 2012 Bank of America 500 marked the first race since the 1979 Southern 500 that an Earnhardt had not competed in the Sprint Cup Series, as Dale Earnhardt had competed in every race from that one up until his death in the 2001 Daytona 500. On October 23, 2012, Earnhardt was cleared for the Tums Fast Relief 500 at Martinsville after missing two races. He started strong in the race, but a late race spin with Carl Edwards placed for a 21st-place finish. His first top ten finish after returning to the track was a seventh-place finish at Texas. At Phoenix, Earnhardt fought an ill-handling car and finished 21st. At the season finale, at Homestead, Earnhardt would finish tenth. This was his first top-ten finish at the 1.5-mile track and his twentieth of the season. He closed the season twelfth in the final standings. On November 29, 2012, it was announced that Earnhardt won the NMPA Most Popular Driver Award for the tenth consecutive year. This tied Bill Elliott's streak of ten consecutive wins in the award.

=== 2013 ===
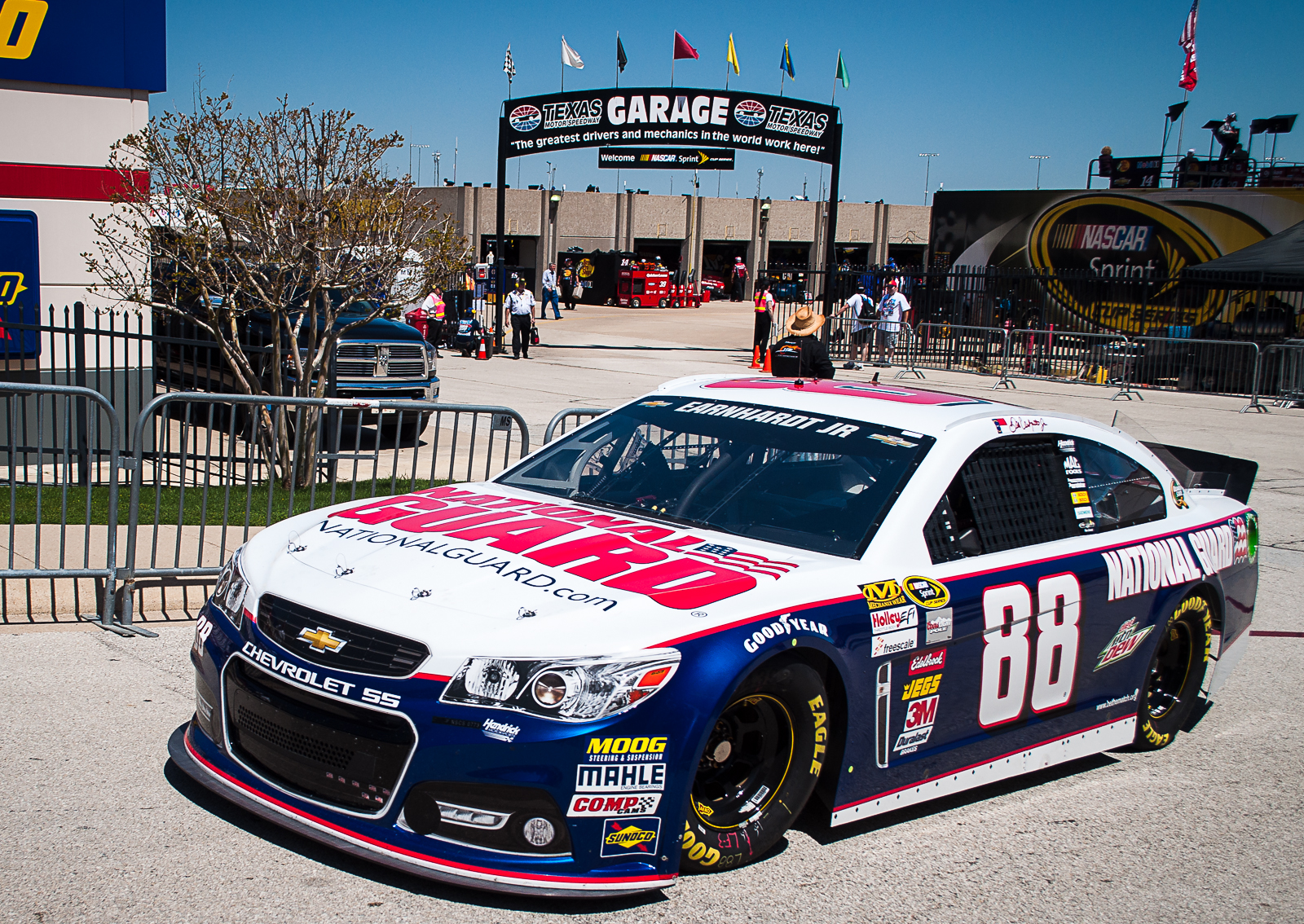
Earnhardt during practice for the 2013 NRA 500 at Texas Motor Speedway

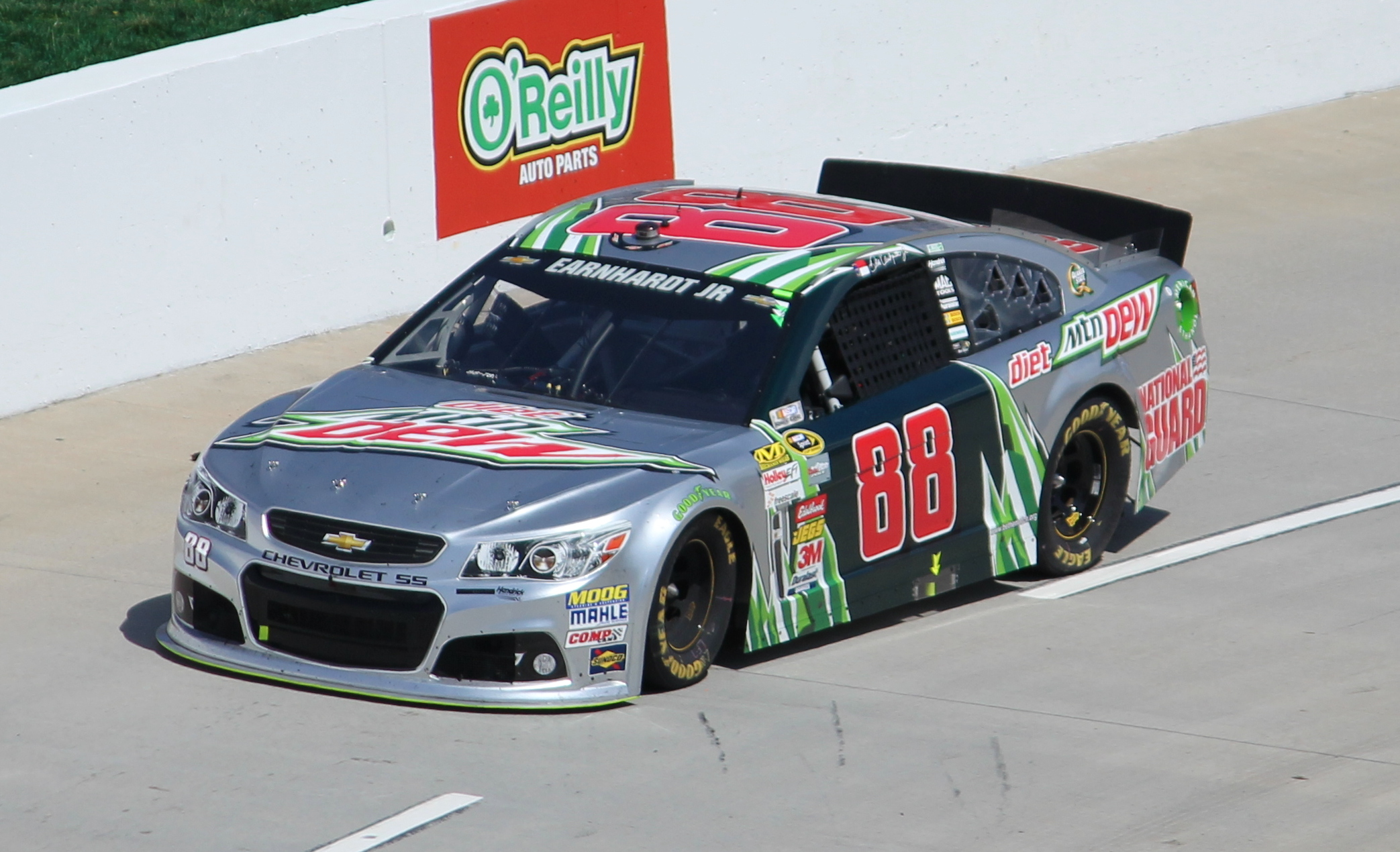
Earnhardt on pit road during the 2013 STP Gas Booster 500 at Martinsville Speedway

Earnhardt started the 2013 season with an eighth-place finish in the rechristened Sprint Unlimited. He qualified 11th for the Budweiser Duel, but he blew an engine in practice, and he was forced to drop to the rear of the field. After narrowly missing a three-car wreck between Carl Edwards, Trevor Bayne, and Regan Smith, he finished ninth. He finished fourth at the DRIVE4COPD 300 after submarining under Alex Bowman's car in a violent last lap wreck.

In the Sprint Cup Series, Earnhardt hit a slight resurgence, and in the first five races of the season, he recorded three top-five finishes and five top-ten finishes. It began with a second-place finish to teammate Jimmie Johnson at the Daytona 500, Earnhardt's third runner-up finish in the 500 since 2010. The following week at Phoenix, he led for 47 laps but was shuffled back in traffic during a cycle caution flag pit stop, which allowed Carl Edwards to assume the lead while Junior finished in fifth place. This was followed by two more top-ten finishes: seventh at Las Vegas and sixth at Bristol. At Fontana, Earnhardt started mid-pack and after a couple of mistakes, including a lengthy pit stop caused by missed lug nuts on a right rear tire, he came home in second place finish, assuming the points lead as a result of Brad Keselowski going off pace and falling back. Two weeks later in Martinsville, Earnhardt struggled throughout the race and spun out after Danica Patrick was hit by Brian Vickers and sent into Earnhardt and ended up finishing 24th, two laps down, losing the points lead to Jimmie Johnson.

At Texas, Earnhardt ran near the front until lap 187, when his battery alternator quit and he ended up finishing 29th. At Kansas, he ran near the front until a debris caution happened while he, Ricky Stenhouse Jr., and Carl Edwards were all on pit road. Earnhardt would go a lap down, take the wave-around, and finish sixteenth. At Richmond, he finished tenth. At Talladega, he went a lap down early after some banging with Travis Kvapil. However, with a caution for a crash on lap 43, Earnhardt got the free pass to get back on the lead lap. He made his way back up through the field to the top five but slipped back to seventeenth at the end.

The following week at Darlington, Earnhardt raced inside the top ten much of the night before settling for a 9th-place finish. He was one of only a few cars who were able to avoid being put a lap down by Kyle Busch.

The following week in the Sprint All-Star Race, Earnhardt battled a tight-handling car much of that night before finishing seventh. The following week, for the Coca-Cola 600, Earnhardt lost an engine and finished 39th, giving him his first DNF since 2011. The next two weeks saw a rebound, with finishes of tenth at Dover and third at Pocono. At the Quicken Loans 400, Earnhardt led 23 laps but suffered an engine failure, and finished 37th in what was the lowest point of the season for the Hendrick Motorsports teams as a whole (Kasey Kahne and Jeff Gordon both had DNF's due to crashes, and Jimmie Johnson cut a tire with five laps to go). After the low of Michigan, Earnhardt had a twelfth place finish at Sonoma.

At Kentucky, Earnhardt won the pole and set a new track qualifying speed record with a lap time of 29.406 seconds and a speed of 183.636 miles per hour (295.533 km/h). Though he started on the pole, he lost the lead to Carl Edwards early. However, while Earnhardt was leading after the restart from a competition caution (due to a rain delay), Denny Hamlin cut a tire and the carcass came up the track and was struck by Earnhardt's splitter and also by Jimmie Johnson's car, causing significant damage. Earnhardt had to make several charges through the field to salvage a twelfth-place finish. He then took an eighth-place finish at the Coke Zero 400. He, Johnson, and Ryan Newman were the only three drivers to sweep the top ten in both Daytona races.

Earnhardt then battled a struggling car at New Hampshire, where he finished fourteenth. After the final off week, he found some consistency with finishes of sixth at Indianapolis and fifth at Pocono, while battling loose wheels and vibrations in a span of two weeks.

The No. 88 team then had two bad weeks, with a thirtieth-place finish at Watkins Glen due to a late race crash with Kasey Kahne. The next week, Earnhardt blew a right front tire while running in the top ten. The damage was enough that he finished 26 laps down, in 36th place. This evaporated his Chase cushion, but with finishes of tenth at Bristol and eighth at Atlanta, he was able to rebuild this cushion. At Richmond, the last race of the regular season, Earnhardt only needed to finish 32nd or better to make the Chase. A thirteenth-place finish did this, and he entered the Chase seeded in ninth place. This was the first time in Earnhardt's career that he had made three straight Chase appearances. In the first Chase race at Chicagoland Speedway, Earnhardt suffered an engine failure, placing him last in Chase competition. He bounced back at New Hampshire Motor Speedway, leading seventeen laps and finishing sixth. The result was good enough to move Earnhardt up to 11th in the Chase for the Sprint Cup standings with eight races left in the season.

At Dover, Earnhardt won his second pole of the season, setting a new qualifying speed record of 161.849 mph. This was the first time since 2002 that he had recorded more than one pole during a season. During the race, Earnhardt would lead eighty laps but would finish second to Jimmie Johnson. The following week at Kansas, he finished eighth. Making his five-hundredth Cup start at Charlotte, Earnhardt led nineteen laps early but finished 15th while battling a tight race car. The following week at Talladega, Earnhardt led 38 laps and was about to receive a push from Austin Dillon to overtake Jamie McMurray on the last lap when Ricky Stenhouse Jr. tapped Dillon, causing that driver to spin out and then get hit by Casey Mears, leaving Earnhardt with a 2nd-place finish. The following week at Martinville, Earnhardt earned an eighth-place finish. The next week at Texas, he had a solid night, finishing second to Johnson for the third time in the season (after Daytona and Dover). The next week at Phoenix, Earnhardt started by being forced to pit with a loose wheel early, putting him a lap down. However, a caution allowed him to use the free pass to get back on the lead lap and salvage a fourth-place finish.

At the season finale, the last 67 laps saw a tight battle for the lead between Earnhardt, Matt Kenseth; and Denny Hamlin. Hamlin won while Earnhardt finished third, giving him his first top-five at Homestead. He finished off the season fifth in the points, with two pole positions, ten top-fives, and a career-high 22 top-tens.

On December 5, 2013, Earnhardt won the Most Popular Driver Award for the eleventh consecutive year, breaking Bill Elliott's record, who scored ten straight awards from 1991 to 2000.

=== 2014 ===
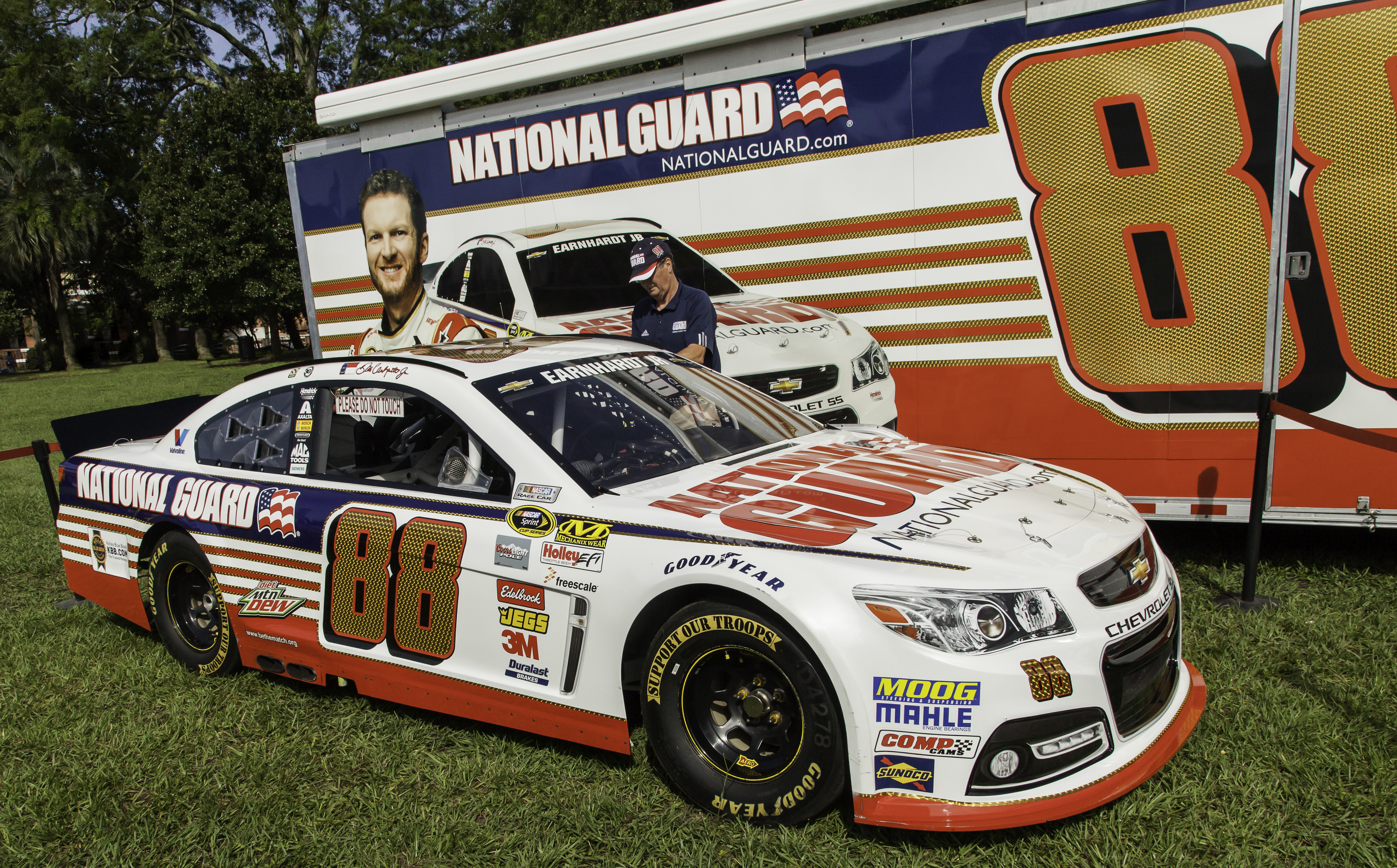
Earnhardt's 2014 Cup Series car

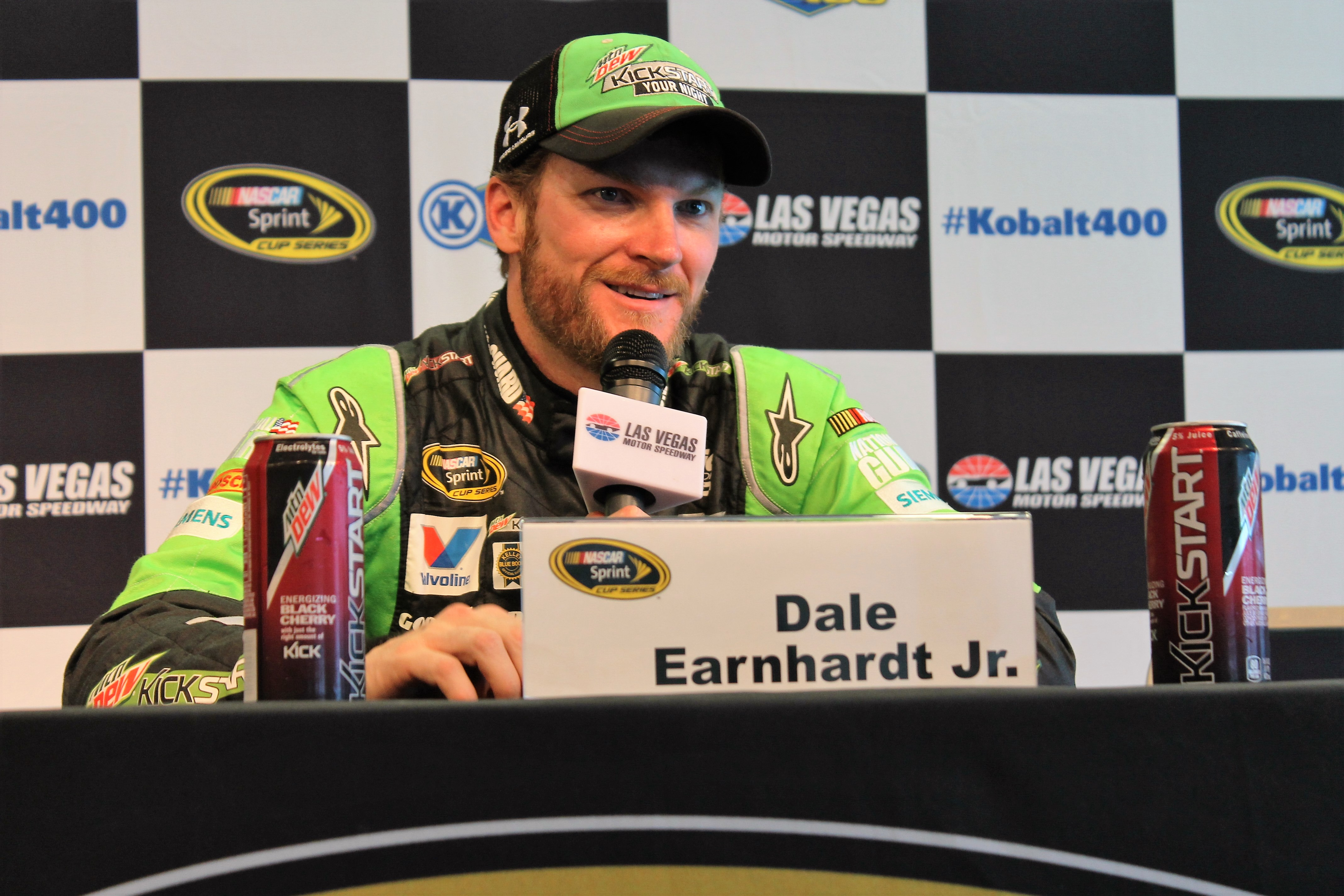
Earnhardt Jr. at Las Vegas Motor Speedway

The No. 88 team made headlines even before the start of the season. During the regular Daytona Winter test in January, it was announced that crew chief Steve Letarte would step down from the pit box after the season to become a full-time member of the upcoming NASCAR on NBC broadcast team, alongside Jeff Burton and Rick Allen. Earnhardt and Letarte reassured that this move would not interfere with them winning races and competing for the championship at the season's end. In the Sprint Unlimited, Earnhardt led for seven laps, but in the last segment, contact with Marcos Ambrose caused him to hit the wall in turn 1, finishing ninth. In the first Budweiser Duel, Earnhardt started 4th, and led 14 laps before fading back to finish where he started.

In the Daytona 500, Earnhardt started ninth. His car hung around mid-pack for most of the first quarter of the race. After a six-hour and 22-minute red flag, Earnhardt's car came alive, taking the lead with 70 laps remaining. He led 54 of the last 70 laps and he held off Denny Hamlin and Brad Keselowski to win his second Daytona 500, just 10 years after his first one. The following week at Phoenix, Earnhardt continued his momentum, finishing 2nd to Kevin Harvick. At Las Vegas, Earnhardt gambled on fuel in the remaining forty laps, but he ran out of gas while leading on the last lap, finishing second to eventual race winner Brad Keselowski. At Bristol, he was strong early and had a chance to become the first driver since Richard Petty to start a season with four straight Top 2 finishes, until tire problems forced him to make an unscheduled stop, leaving him to finish 24th, four laps down.

At Auto Club Speedway, Earnhardt started fifteenth. However, on lap 44, his car lost a right front tire and hit the outside wall in turn 2, bringing out a caution, making him one of several victims of tire failures that plagued the race. After being repaired and falling to the back of the lead lap, Earnhardt made several charges through the field to salvage a twelfth-place finish, keeping him at second place in the points. The following week at Martinsville, Earnhardt battled inside the top-five all day, leading 25 laps, and finished third, giving him his fourth Top 3 finish of the season, and regained the points lead. At Texas, he crashed on lap 13 and caught on fire. He finished last and fell five positions in points and dropped to 31 points behind the new points leader Jeff Gordon. The following week at Darlington, Earnhardt raced among the top-five all night and was leading on a green-white-checkered finish, before finishing 2nd to Kevin Harvick.

At Richmond, after the Easter off week, Earnhardt was strong in the race, racing among the top-three late, and led seven laps, but a green-white-checkered, and bad brakes forced Earnhardt to a 7th-place finish. The following week at Talladega, Earnhardt raced among the pack until the middle of the race, when he took the lead. He led for 26 laps, but the last 30 laps saw the car take a conservative pace, and he was never able to regain any track position, finishing 26th. At Kansas, for the first night race at the track, Earnhardt ran solidly in the top-five, even leading a few laps, before finishing fifth.

For the Sprint All-Star Race, Earnhardt started sixth, but battled a tight car all night and was never a real contender. Earnhardt crossed the finish line 4th. The following week at the Coca-Cola 600, he raced inside the top-five for most of the night, before making an unscheduled pit stop for an engine vibration. This resulted in a nineteenth-place finish, only two laps down. The following week at Dover, Earnhardt raced inside the top-ten all day and was running in the top-five late, but a mistake on pit road left them with a 9th-place finish.

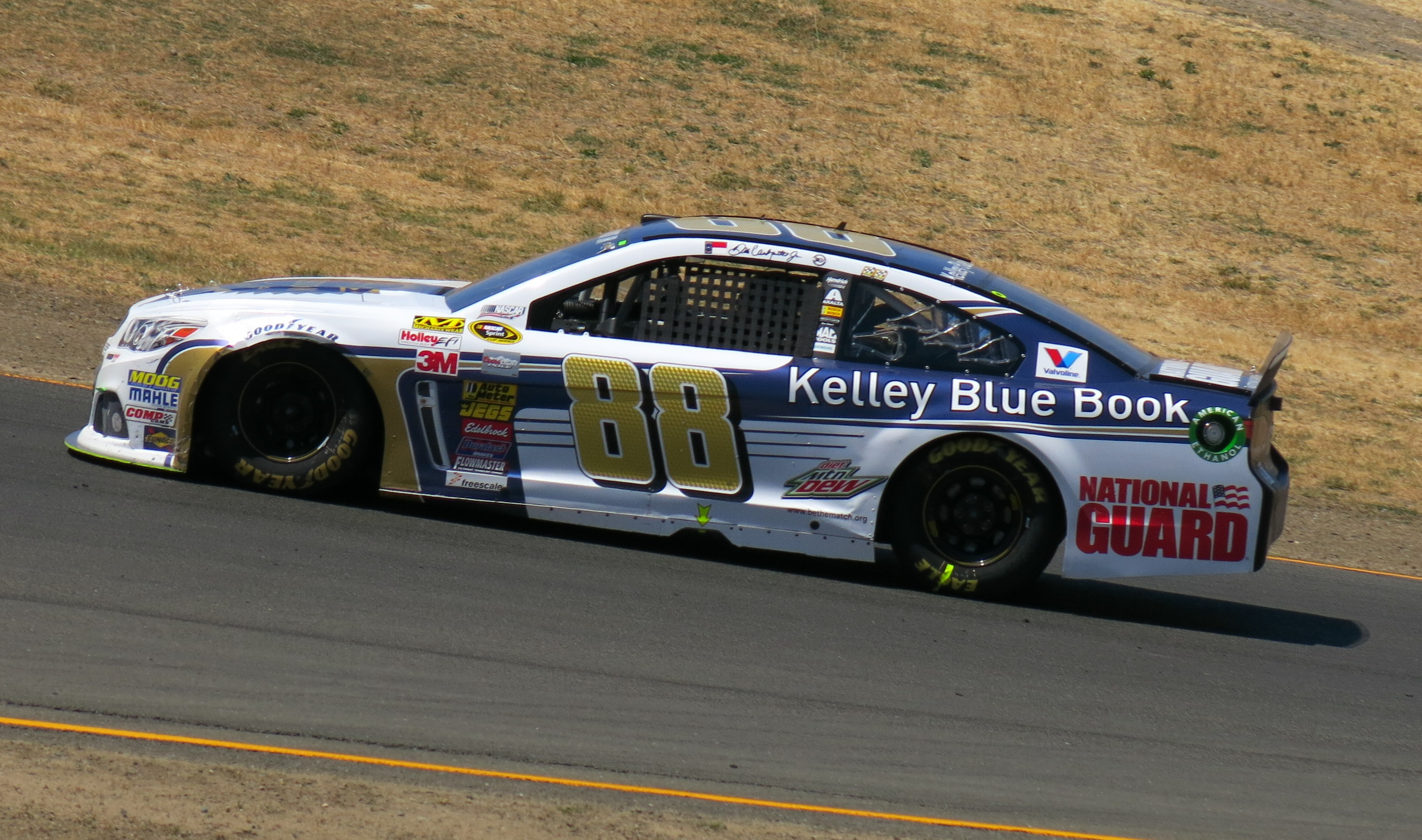
Dale Jr. competing in the 2014 Toyota/Save Mart 350 at Sonoma.

At Pocono, Earnhardt started eighth and stayed inside the top ten most of the afternoon. On the last restart, he was behind Brad Keselowski. In a reversal of the events at Las Vegas, with five laps to go, Keselowski tried to move behind the lap down car of Danica Patrick to get a piece of trash off his grille, which caused Earnhardt to slip by and never look back en route to his first victory at Pocono and second of the season. The win marked the first time since 2004 that he had won multiple races in a season. The next week at Michigan, Earnhardt started inside the top-five, but finished seventh, after several cars had different pit strategies. The next week at Sonoma, Earnhardt had his statistical best road course finish, staying in the top ten for most of the race, and finished third. The following week at Kentucky, Earnhardt finished fifth.

Returning to Daytona, Earnhardt was involved in an early sixteen-car pileup on the front straightaway on lap twenty, but was able to salvage a fourteenth-place finish by the time the race was called for rain after 112 of 160 laps.

Earnhardt was able to bounce back the following week at New Hampshire with a tenth-place finish. With the finish, he clinched a Chase berth, with him being enough inside the top-thirtieth and having two victories. The following week, he finished ninth at Indianapolis.

The questions referring to the replacement of Steve Letarte were finally answered on July 30, for it was announced that Greg Ives, Chase Elliott's Nationwide Series crew chief at JR Motorsports, would return to Hendrick Motorsports, and take over Earnhardt's pit box for 2015.

Returning to Pocono, Earnhardt started ninth. He ran inside the top ten for most of the race and took the lead from Greg Biffle with fourteen laps to go. Earnhardt had built up a lead in excess of three seconds when the caution came out for Kurt Busch's cut tire on lap 154, erasing his lead. He then sweated out a four-lap shootout on the last restart to take his third win of the year, marking the first time since 2006 that a driver swept both Pocono races (Denny Hamlin was the last driver). This win tied Earnhardt with Jimmie Johnson and Brad Keselowski for most wins of the season up to that point.

At Watkins Glen, Earnhardt finished eleventh, and due to Jeff Gordon struggling, assumed the points lead, for the first time since Martinsville in April. The following week at Michigan, he made contact with Kyle Larson on pit road, but through hard work from his pit crew, was able to lead four laps and salvage a fifth-place finish.

The following week at Bristol, while running fifth, leader Denny Hamlin was wrecked by Kevin Harvick while racing for the lead, which then sent Hamlin's car into the inside wall. Hamlin's car then slid right back up in front of the No. 88 and slammed into the left-side door of the car, and the contact was bad enough to send Earnhardt behind the wall and suffer a 39th-place finish. This was his second DNF of the year, after the early exit in the spring Texas race.

In the final race of NASCAR's regular season at Richmond, Earnhardt made his debut with a Nationwide-sponsored No. 88. He raced to a 12th-place finish, after what was a long, difficult night for the team. Despite struggling at the 3/4-mile track, Earnhardt seeded third in the Chase grid, behind series leader Brad Keselowski, and tied with Jeff Gordon, Jimmie Johnson, and Joey Logano for second place. He started the Challenger Round of the Chase with an eleventh-place finish in Chicago. The following week at New Hampshire, Earnhardt finished a solid ninth-place finish, giving him a comfortable advantage to make the Contender Round after Dover. At Dover, he finished seventeenth to make it to the next round.

At Kansas, after a fifth-place run in the spring, Earnhardt was looking to repeat this feat to start off as a contender with a solid finish to help his chances to extend his run for the championship. After leading 45 laps in the same car he used to win both Pocono races earlier in the season, a cut right front tire resulted in a 39th-place finish. That finish caused him to fall to eleventh place in points, 25 points behind eighth place. He came to Charlotte needing a win or a good finish. He led early, but around lap 133, his shifter broke due to a vibration (a similar problem had befallen Jimmie Johnson at Michigan in August). He had to make multiple pit stops to fix the problem and never recovered, ending up twentieth. He fell to last in the Chase standings, 26 points behind eighth.

At Talladega, Earnhardt started 28th and led for 31 laps. However, a crash on the back straightaway when he was turned by Greg Biffle ended his title contention chances and left him with a 31st-place finish.

Despite being knocked out of the Chase, Earnhardt continued to be consistent. At Martinsville, he led 79 laps and was leading with ten laps to go when a caution came out for a wreck between Kyle Larson and Marcos Ambrose. On the resulting restart, Earnhardt was running fifth. During the restart, he slipped through the pack and overtook Tony Stewart for the lead in turn 4. He continued to hold the lead to win the race ahead of Jeff Gordon. It was Earnhardt's first career win at Martinsville.

Returning to Texas, Earnhardt had a rather average run, starting twelfth and finishing sixth. At Phoenix, he had a solid day and got another top-ten, finishing eighth. At Homestead, Earnhardt had a tire problem early. He got the free pass and managed to crack the top five at one point, but fell back late to finish fourteenth. He finished eighth in the final standings with what was the best season for Earnhardt since 2004, with four wins, twelve top-fives, twenty top-tens, and an average finish of 12.2. For the twelfth straight year, Earnhardt won the NMPA Most Popular Driver Award.

=== 2015 ===
At the end of 2014, Earnhardt Jr.'s crew chief Steve Letarte departed Hendrick Motorsports to join NASCAR on NBC's broadcasting team. Letarte was replaced by Chase Elliott's 2014 Xfinity crew chief Greg Ives. Due to the National Guard dropping their motorsports sponsorships, Earnhardt Jr. also got a new sponsor in the form of Nationwide Insurance.

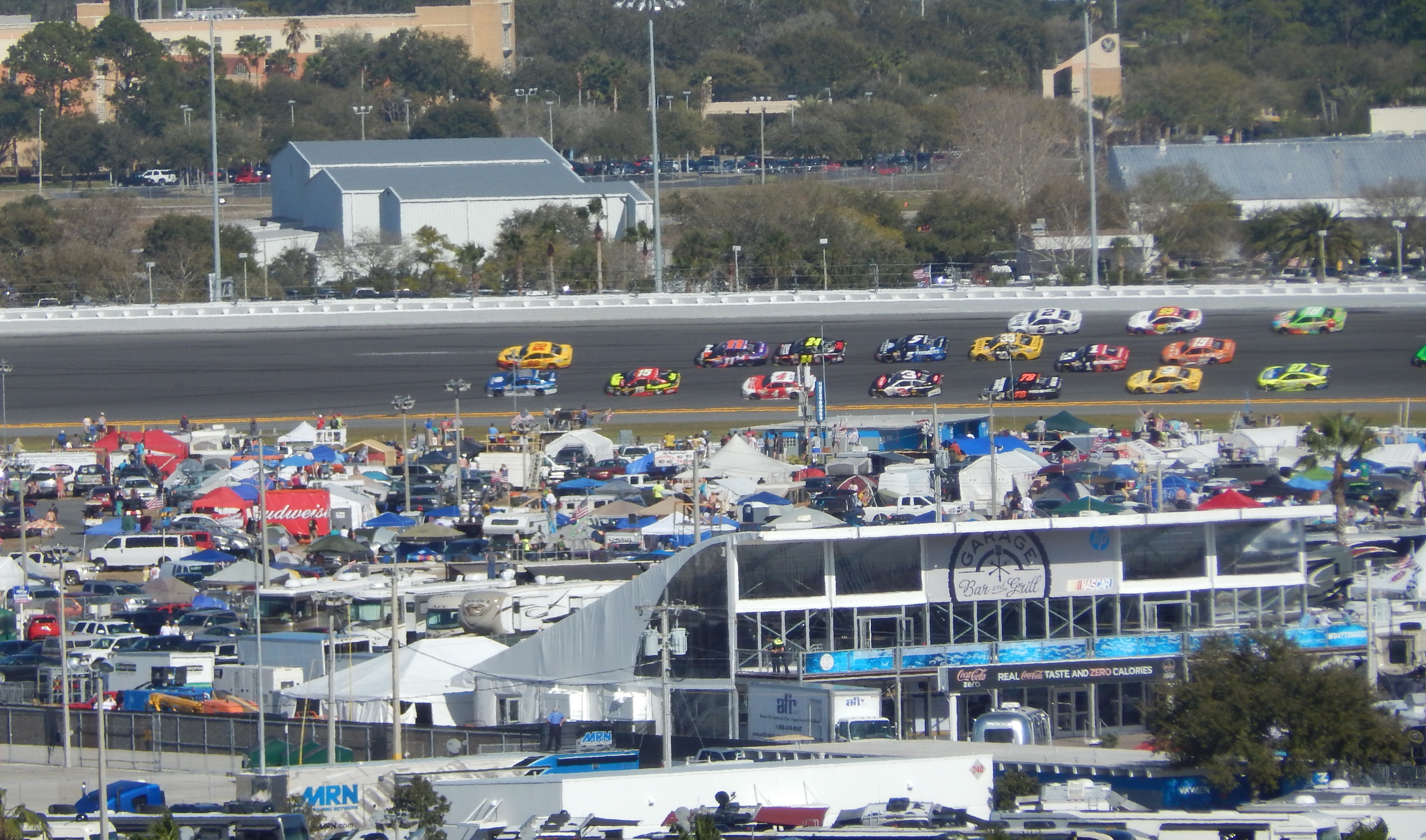
Earnhardt racing alongside Joey Logano on lap 115 of the 2015 Daytona 500.

Earnhardt Jr. kicked off 2015 with a ninth-place finish in the Sprint Unlimited. On February 19, he won the first Budweiser Duel in what was his fourth triumph in the Budweiser Duels. In the Daytona 500, he led for over thirty laps, but on one of the last restarts, he made a move that mired him in the middle without help, and fell back to sixteenth with fifteen laps to go, but managed to make his way back to third place by the last lap. This was his fifth top-three finish in the Daytona 500 in six years, after his runner-up finishes in 2010, 2012, and 2013, and his win in 2014.

At Atlanta, Earnhardt Jr. came home with another third-place finish, and at Las Vegas, he finished 4th, scoring his third top-five finish after taking two tires during green flag pit-stops with 30 laps to go. At Phoenix, he had his worst finish of the year, with a last-place finish after a tire blowout. At Auto Club, he finished sixth. At Martinsville, he also ran inside the top twenty until a tire blowout made him get involved in a massive pileup that destroyed the front end of his car. Because of this crash, he would go on to finish 36th. At Texas, he narrowly was beaten by Kevin Harvick for 2nd-place. At Bristol, he ran as high as 3rd-place until a loose wheel put him two laps down. Although he never got them back, he was able to bring home a 16th-place finish, only two laps down. At Richmond, he ran in the Top 10 all day until he and Tony Stewart made contact, but managed to finish 14th.

At Talladega, Earnhardt Jr. started in the second row. He stayed near the front of the pack for most of the day, taking the lead with 27 laps to go and sailing away to his sixth win at the track and his first since October 2004, tying him with teammate Jeff Gordon for most wins among active drivers at Talladega. At Kansas, he finished third after staying out on the last caution. At Charlotte, he gambled on fuel and barely beat out Matt Kenseth and Martin Truex Jr. for another third-place finish. Earnhardt led three laps at Dover, but a penalty for speeding on pit road cost him, although he was able to finish fourteenth two laps down.

At Pocono, Earnhardt ran in the top ten all day. On a late restart, he and Brad Keselowski cut their tires from incidental contact, and a caution flew seconds later when Keselowski hit the wall after making contact with Brett Moffitt. Earnhardt Jr. pitted and restarted 29th with 20 laps to go and salvaged an 11th-place finish. Earnhardt finished 2nd in the rain-shortened Michigan race after he could not pass Kurt Busch on the last restart before the race was called for rain on lap 138. Earnhardt also had another solid Top 10 run at Sonoma, finishing 7th.

Returning to Daytona, Earnhardt Jr. won the pole for the Coke Zero 400 after qualifying was rained out and the starting lineup was set by opening practice times. In the race itself, after enduring a rain delay, he took the lead early on lap eight, and after leading 97 laps, held off multiple charges from Jimmie Johnson and Denny Hamlin in the closing laps to take his second win of the year. The win itself, however, was overshadowed by the last lap crash that saw Austin Dillon's car fly into the catch fence. Earnhardt Jr. also became only the 23rd driver in NASCAR Sprint Cup history to lead over 8,000 laps. He achieved this milestone when he led 97 laps. This brought his career total laps led count to 8,051.

At Kentucky, Earnhardt Jr. struggled with overheated brakes and even caused a caution when he brushed the outside wall in turns 3 and 4 halfway through the race. Later, on lap 206, he would be the subject of controversy when he rear-ended Danica Patrick and spun her out, in part because of his faulty brakes. Patrick retaliated by cursing at Earnhardt on the radio and ramming him on pit road. Earnhardt was perplexed with Patrick's reaction, saying, "I mean, what am I supposed to say other than the truth? We didn't have any brakes going into the corner. I know better than to run into her because it gets so much attention. There wasn't nothing I could do. I mean, as hard as I hit her, what the hell did she think I was doing? Trying to wreck her? We ain't got no problem. It's not like we were having a problem out on the racetrack with her. It's not like I just drew her name out of a hat and decided she was the one I was going to run into tonight."

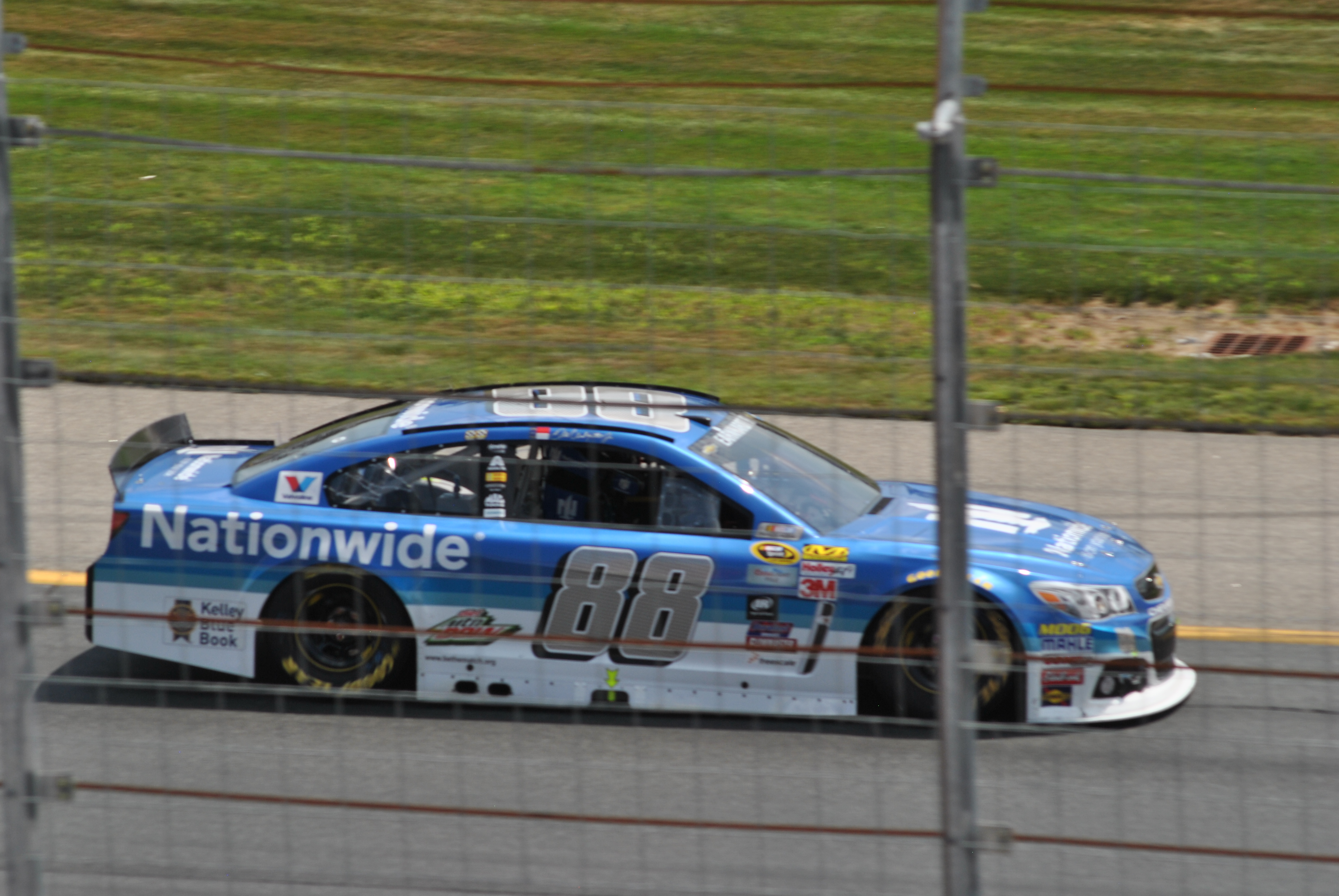
Earnhardt Jr. racing at New Hampshire Motor Speedway in 2015

At New Hampshire, Earnhardt Jr. started 19th and finished 5th.

At Indianapolis, Earnhardt Jr. was running well until lap 147, when he got forced into the grass in turn 1 and spun out. He was able to salvage a 22nd-place finish.

Returning to Pocono, Earnhardt Jr. was involved in a spin on a restart on lap 72 that also involved Kurt Busch. His car did not take severe damage, however, and despite running mid-pack for most of the second half of the race and running 17th with four laps to go, he ended up finishing 4th after many other drivers, including the leaders at four laps to go, ran out of fuel.

At Watkins Glen, Earnhardt was able to start seventh and finished eleventh after running in the Top 10 all day, but running out of fuel on the last lap.

Returning to Michigan, Earnhardt Jr. started inside the top ten and was running in the top three in the early part of the race. After battling an ill-handling racecar, he was able to finish tenth.

Earnhardt returned to Bristol looking for his first win at that track since 2004. He qualified 26th, and after the first caution came out, he would pit. During the pit stop, the crew left a wheel loose, and Earnhardt pitted again. After going a lap down multiple times in the race, he got the Lucky Dog and got back on the lead lap. After moving up to the top five later on in the race, he would settle for a ninth-place finish.

The series would take an off week and return to Darlington. Again, Earnhardt would have to start mid-pack. He would run outside the top ten most of the day, but the crew would make the right adjustments, and they would finish 8th.

The regular season finale would take place at Richmond for the 26th race. Earnhardt would qualify 29th and was puzzled in his interview afterwards. During the race, Earnhardt made steady climbs and by halfway had cracked the top ten. Earnhardt would climb as high as fourth and end up finishing fifth. He made the chase for the 8th time in his career and was seeded sixth for the first Chase race.

Earnhardt Jr. opened the Challenger Round with a twelfth-place finish at Chicagoland. At New Hampshire, he ran up front for most of the day, but an emergency fuel stop with two laps to go led him to finish 25th, two laps down, and at the bottom of the Chase cutline. At Dover, despite falling back at a few points, Earnhardt Jr. was locked in a battle with Jamie McMurray for control of the final transfer spot into the Contender Round. He almost did not make it into the next round, with his chances being saved thanks to a caution for Brett Moffitt's crash on lap 357, keeping him from having to make a green flag pit stop to replace a loose wheel. On the last restart, Earnhardt Jr. overtook McMurray on the outside and finished third, clinching the final transfer spot and bumping McMurray out of the Chase.

At Charlotte, Earnhardt Jr was battling for a position inside the top ten when he made contact with Carl Edwards and hit the wall, ending up 29th. At Kansas, Earnhardt Jr had to pit for a loose wheel under green and ended up finishing 21st, two laps down. Heading into Talladega, he basically needed to win to advance. He led 61 laps, but he slid his tires coming onto pit road and ended up having to take two tires instead of fuel only, while others were taking fuel only. He ended up in the front row, heading into the only GWC. But a wreck behind him ended up cutting it short, and he ended up second upon a review, eliminating him from the championship. At Martinsville, the week after he was eliminated from Chase Contention, he was strong all race, taking home a 4th-place finish at the track. At Texas the following week, Earnhardt recovered from an early spin to finish 6th. Earnhardt Jr. managed to get his third victory of the season at Phoenix, after the race was called for rain. At the season finale at Homestead, Earnhardt crashed early in the race, finishing fortieth. For the 13th consecutive year, Earnhardt won the NMPA Most Popular Driver Award.

=== 2016 ===
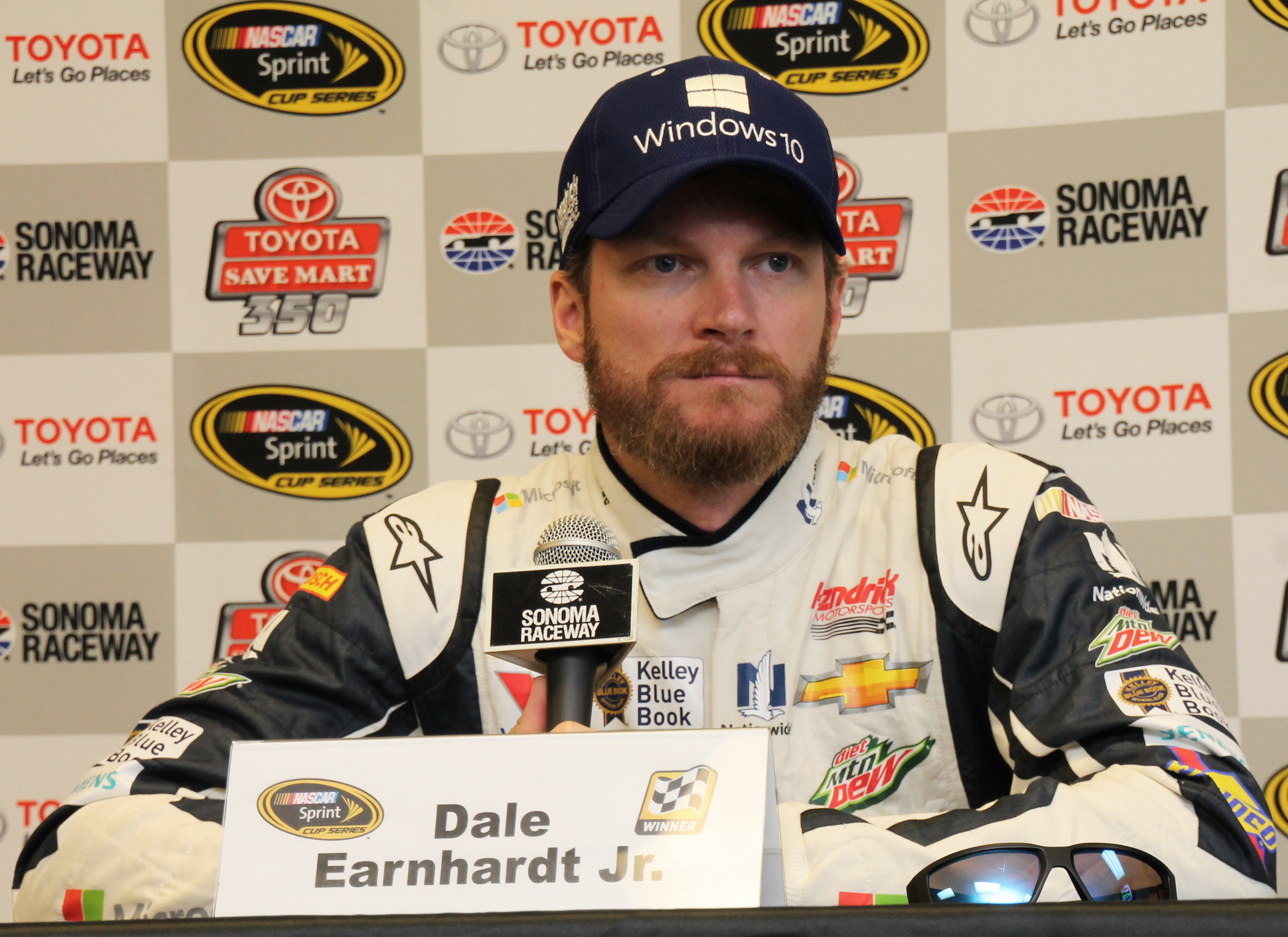
Earnhardt Jr. at the 2015 Toyota/Save Mart 350

Earnhardt started the 2016 season with a crash in the Sprint Unlimited on lap 23 when Brian Vickers cut down a tire and hit him, damaging the side of his car. This would allow him to finish fifteenth, four laps down. He then went on to win the first Can-Am Duel race for the second year in a row. In the Daytona 500, he was strong early in the race, but with thirty laps to go, he spun off of turn 4 while trying to make a move and hit the SAFER barrier head-on. He would wind up 36th. The following week in Atlanta, he was very strong, finishing second. The following week, at Las Vegas, Earnhardt had a car that was solid all day and ended with an eighth-place finish. At the spring race in Phoenix, he led for a good portion of the race but stayed out on old tires during overtime. Because of this, he slid his tires on the start, finishing fifth. At Fontana the next week, he struggled throughout the race in the early stages, even being as low as 34th. But in overtime, he made a charge, finishing eleventh. At Martinsville, he spun on lap five, spending 300 laps one lap down. But in the end, he finished fourteenth and on the lead lap. In Texas, he was strong late in the race, finishing second to Kyle Busch, who won back-to-back races. At Bristol, he stalled his car on the start, going two laps down. But as the race went on, his car came to life and he finished second.

When the Xfinity Series came to Richmond for the running of the Toyota Care 250, Earnhardt would finish second in the first heat race. In the main feature, he would dominate and win the race holding off Ty Dillon for his first Xfinity win since 2010 and his first for JR Motorsports.

On lap fifty at the spring Talladega race, he got loose in the draft and, just like Daytona, he hit the wall, damaging his car. This would result in a 40th-place finish. At Kansas, he started 22nd and finished fifteenth. The following week at Dover, he would start second because qualifying was rained out, but was involved in a late wreck on a botched restart, finishing 32nd.

In the All-Star Race, qualifying was rained out, so he started tenth due to owner points, but was able to finish third.

==== Concussions end season ====
In July, Earnhardt was diagnosed with concussion-like symptoms and would miss the second half of the year as a result. He was replaced by Alex Bowman for the New Hampshire 301 and Jeff Gordon at the Brickyard 400 and Pennsylvania 400. On September 2, Earnhardt announced he would sit out the remainder of the season with Gordon and Bowman continuing their replacement roles in the 88. On December 8, 2016, Earnhardt was medically cleared to return to competition in 2017. Despite missing the second half of the season, Earnhardt Jr. won the NMPA Most Popular Driver Award for the fourteenth consecutive time.

It was also during this year that Junior would announce, that after his death, his brain would be donated to science to research how his concussions impacted his brain.

=== 2017: Final year ===
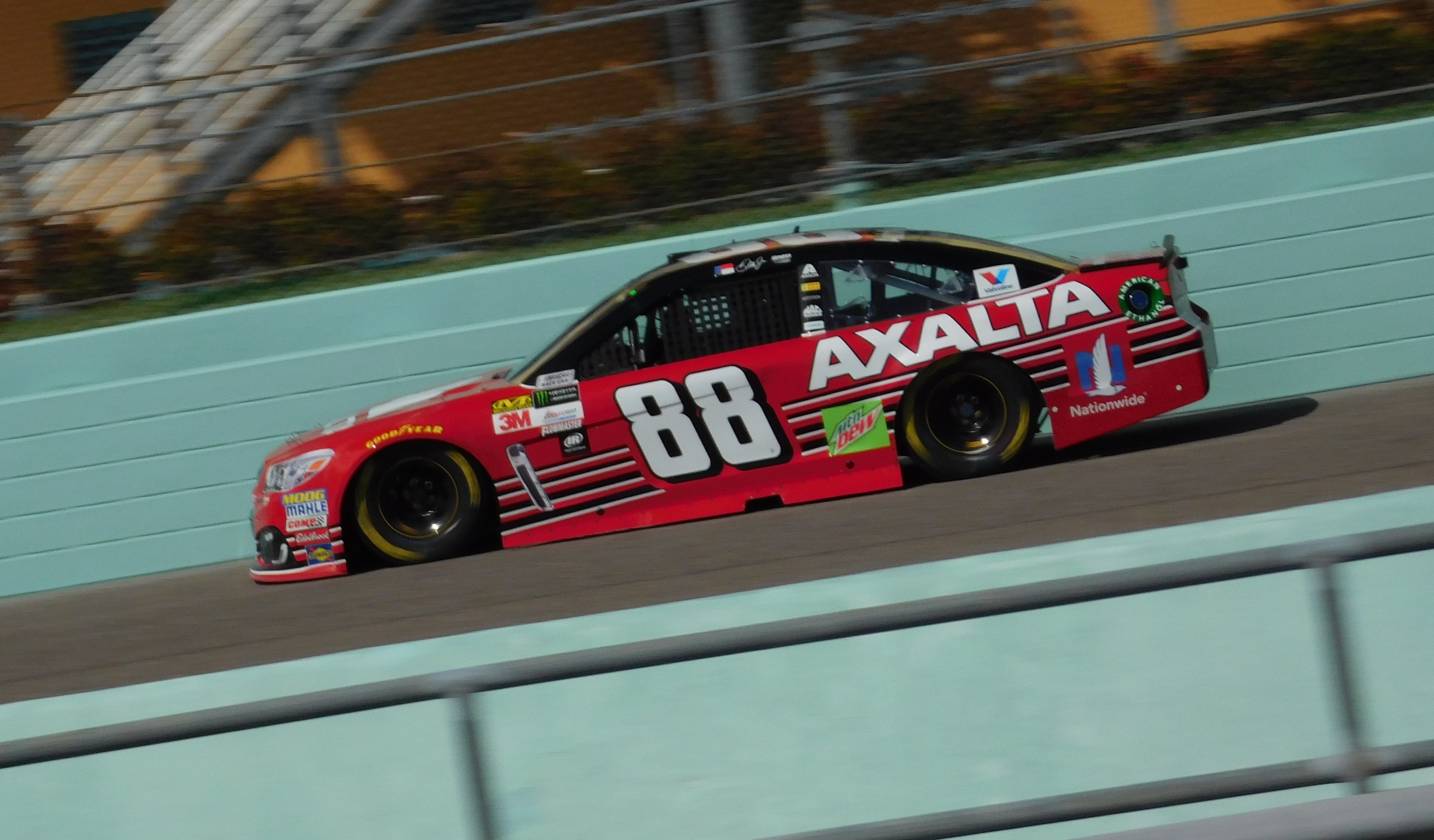
Earnhardt during his final race as a full-time Cup driver in the 2017 Ford EcoBoost 400

Earnhardt started the 2017 Daytona 500 qualifying 2nd but was wrecked while leading mid-race, and finished 37th. After a string of lackluster finishes, he managed to score a top-five at the newly repaved Texas. It was his first and only top-five finish of the year. On April 25, 2017, Earnhardt announced that 2017 would be his final year driving full-time. Earnhardt Jr. failed to make the Playoffs in his final year, posting a thirteenth place finish at Richmond, needing a win to make it in. In his final restrictor plate race at Talladega, Earnhardt would start on the pole and he would miss three big wrecks in the closing laps to finish seventh. In his final career race, Earnhardt started in 24th place and finished in 25th place. He ended up in 21st in points standings. He ended up with only one top-five, eight top-tens, two poles, and seven DNF's. However, he did win his fifteenth consecutive and final Most Popular Driver award. Even though fifteen straight years of Earnhardt being most popular driver is a NASCAR record, he is second all-time to Bill Elliott, who has sixteen most popular driver awards, including ten straight.

=== 2018–present ===
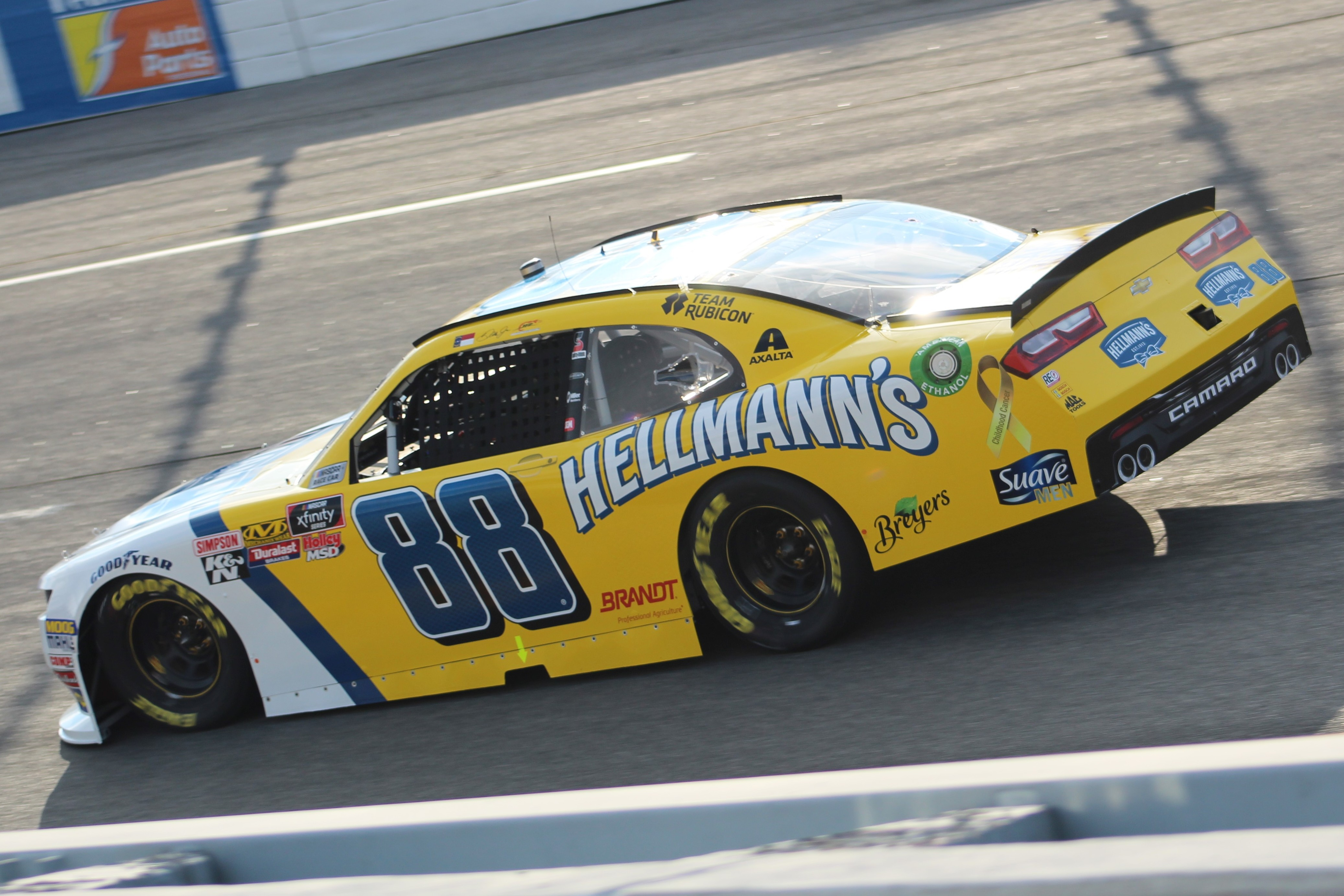
Earnhardt during an Xfinity Series race at Richmond Raceway in 2018.

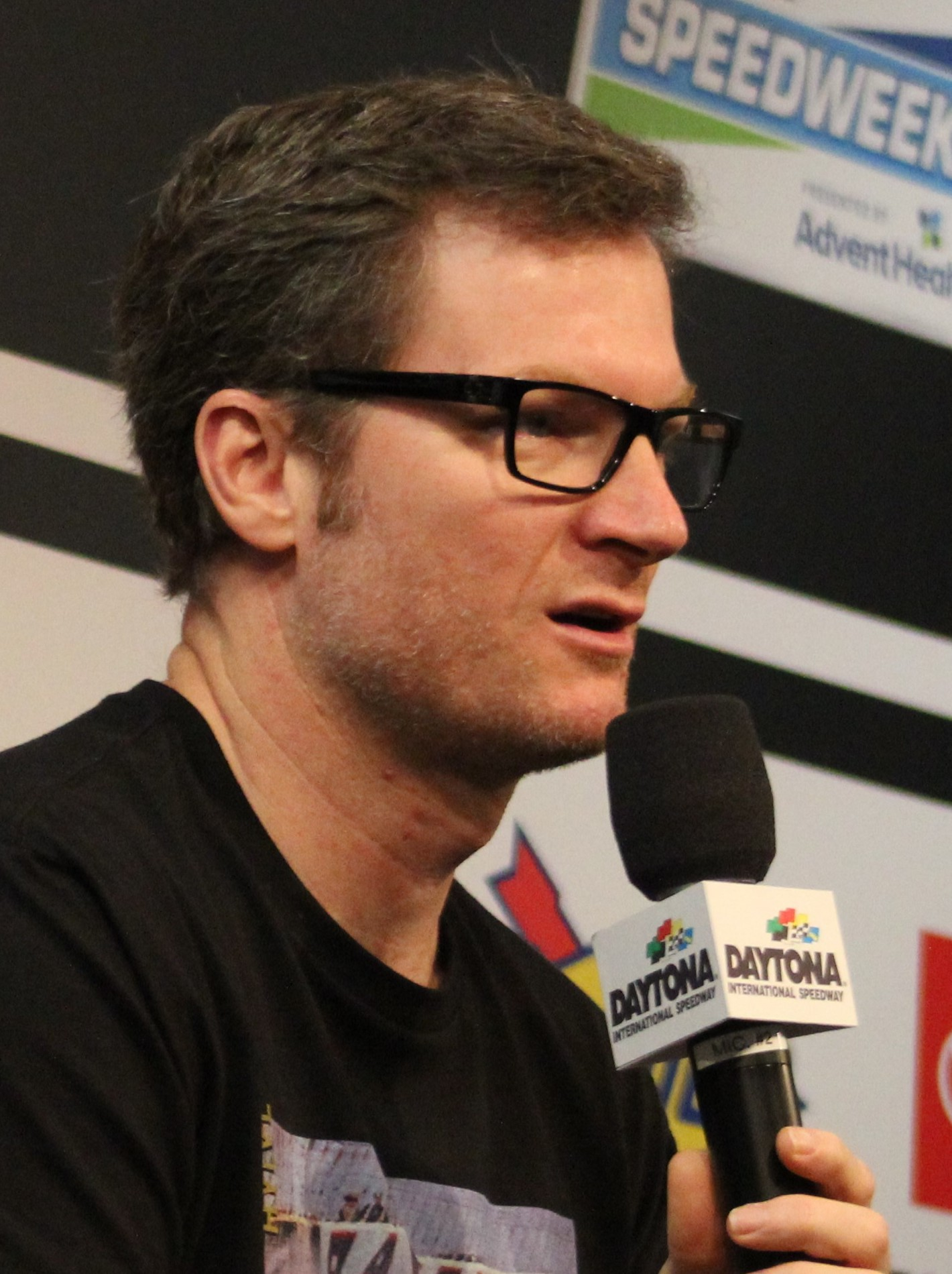
Earnhardt Jr. at Daytona International Speedway in 2020

After his retirement, Earnhardt began sporadically racing in the Xfinity Series with JR Motorsports. In 2018, he ran the fall Xfinity race at Richmond in the No. 88, after qualifying second, he dominated by leading 96 of the 250 laps, but would ultimately finish fourth after a late race restart. The following year, he contested the Sport Clips Haircuts VFW 200 at Darlington, his first Xfinity start at the track since 1999, driving a No. 8 designed after his father's 1975 Cup car. After starting 15th, he finished fifth; he had originally finished sixth but was promoted one position following Denny Hamlin's disqualification.

In 2020, Earnhardt shared the No. 8 with Daniel Hemric and Jeb Burton. At the 2020 Daytona 500, Earnhardt Jr. was named the Honorary Starter and waved the green flag to officially begin the race. It was soon announced Earnhardt would compete in the Hooters 250 at Homestead that year. Earnhardt finished 5th.

It was announced on September 10, 2021, that he would be running in the 2021 running of the Go Bowling 250, with his paint scheme honoring the ones who lost their lives in the 9/11 attacks exactly twenty years ago to the day.

On April 8, 2022, Earnhardt made his Xfinity series start at Martinsville and would ultimately finish eleventh after starting thirtieth. He drove the No. 88 in the race for the first time since 2018.

Earnhardt expanded his Xfinity schedule from one race to two in 2023, with Hellmann's sponsoring him at Bristol in September and Bass Pro Shops sponsoring him at Homestead in October. At Bristol, he was running near the lead with 30 laps to go until a fire in the shifter tunnel column resulted in a thirtieth place DNF.

On September 20, 2024, Earnhardt raced in the Xfinity Series Food City 300 at Bristol. He drove the No. 88 and finished in seventh place despite a myriad of issues with the car and not having raced in nearly a year.

=== Other racing ===
On top of his 26 career NASCAR Cup regular-season victories, Earnhardt has also won nine exhibition races. He won the 2003, 2004, 2008, 2015, and 2016 Budweiser Duels, the 2000 The Winston, the 2003 and 2008 Budweiser Shootout, and the 2012 Sprint Showdown. He finished second in the 1999 IROC race from Michigan International Speedway, barely losing to his father. In 1998, he was one of a select few drivers invited to race in the NASCAR Thunder/Motegi 500 in Motegi, Japan. He achieved a sixth-place finish in this overseas race.

On April 20, 2022, Earnhardt won on his debut in the iRacing MOONCAR series, racing vintage 1987 Winston Cup stock cars at Talladega in dramatic fashion, flipping across the start/finish line. On September 1, he finished third at the CARS Tour Window World 125 at North Wilkesboro. On November 20, Earnhardt finished ninth at the South Carolina 400 at Florence Motor Speedway.

On October 22, 2024, Earnhardt announced that he will reunite with Budweiser and drive the No. 8 in select Late Model races in 2024 and 2025, starting with the 2024 South Carolina 400 at Florence.

== Team ownership ==
=== Chance 2 Motorsports ===
In 2003, Earnhardt and his stepmother, Teresa, founded Chance 2 Motorsports as a separate entity from DEI. The company hired Martin Truex Jr. to drive the No. 8 in the 2004 and 2005 Busch Series season, and he would go on to win the championship both years. Truex won twelve races for the team, and Earnhardt added four more, three of which were in 2003. The company would later endure financial struggles and go out of business in 2006, and Truex, Earnhardt, and the No. 8 car returned to DEI.

=== JR Motorsports ===
Earnhardt is a co-owner of JR Motorsports with his older sister, Kelley Earnhardt Miller, a NASCAR Xfinity and Truck Series team. In 2014, the team won their first NASCAR national championship, as Chase Elliott drove the No. 9 NAPA Auto Parts car to the 2014 NASCAR Nationwide Series championship. In 2015, JR Motorsports began fielding a part-time team in the Truck Series, with Cole Custer driving the No. 00 Haas Automation Chevrolet Silverado in 10 races. Kasey Kahne also drove part-time in the Truck Series, with the two drivers winning at Gateway Motorsports Park and Charlotte, respectively. JR Motorsports also has a very successful regional late model program, with Josh Berry capturing the 2012 Motor Mile Championship in the Whelen All-American series. Berry was also able to win a second track championship at Hickory Motor Speedway.

== Crew chief ==
In June 2025, Earnhardt took on the role of interim crew chief for JR Motorsports driver Connor Zilisch for the Xfinity Series race at Pocono Raceway, following a one-race suspension being issued to the team's regular crew chief, Mardy Lindley. Zilisch won the race, giving Earnhardt his first win as a crew chief in his first appearance in the role.

== Broadcasting career ==
=== NBC (2018–2023) ===
In 2016, Earnhardt was a guest analyst in NASCAR Cup and Xfinity race broadcasts on Fox and NBC.

Earnhardt joined the NASCAR on NBC broadcasting team as a color commentator for the 2018 season. He made his debut on NBCSN's NASCAR America on March 12, 2018, joining Leigh Diffey, Jeff Burton, and his former crew chief Steve Letarte. In his debut at the 2018 Overton's 400 at Chicagoland Speedway, he coined his catchphrase: "Slide job!" when Kyle Busch and Kyle Larson battled for the lead on the final lap.

=== Amazon Prime Video and TNT (2025 onwards) ===
On February 29, 2024, The Athletic reported that Earnhardt Jr's contract with NASCAR on NBC expired after the 2023 season and would reportedly be leaving NBC for Amazon and TNT's new NASCAR coverage in the next TV contract that starts in 2025.

On May 7, 2024, it was officially announced that he would join the broadcast teams of Amazon Prime Video and TNT starting in 2025, presumably continuing as a color commentator. Earnhardt will also participate in a Bleacher Report content series that will be co-produced with his Dirty Mo Media production company.

== Business interests ==
Earnhardt owns Hammerhead Entertainment, a media production company that created and produced the TV show Back in the Day, which aired on SPEED. Hammerhead also produced "Shifting Gears", a show on ESPN2 that chronicled his 2008 team switch.

He was a partners with a group of investors who were building Alabama Motorsports Park, a Dale Earnhardt Jr. Speedway. The track was to be located near Mobile, Alabama, and would feature stock car racing, kart racing, and a road course. This would have joined with his partial ownership of Paducah International Raceway.

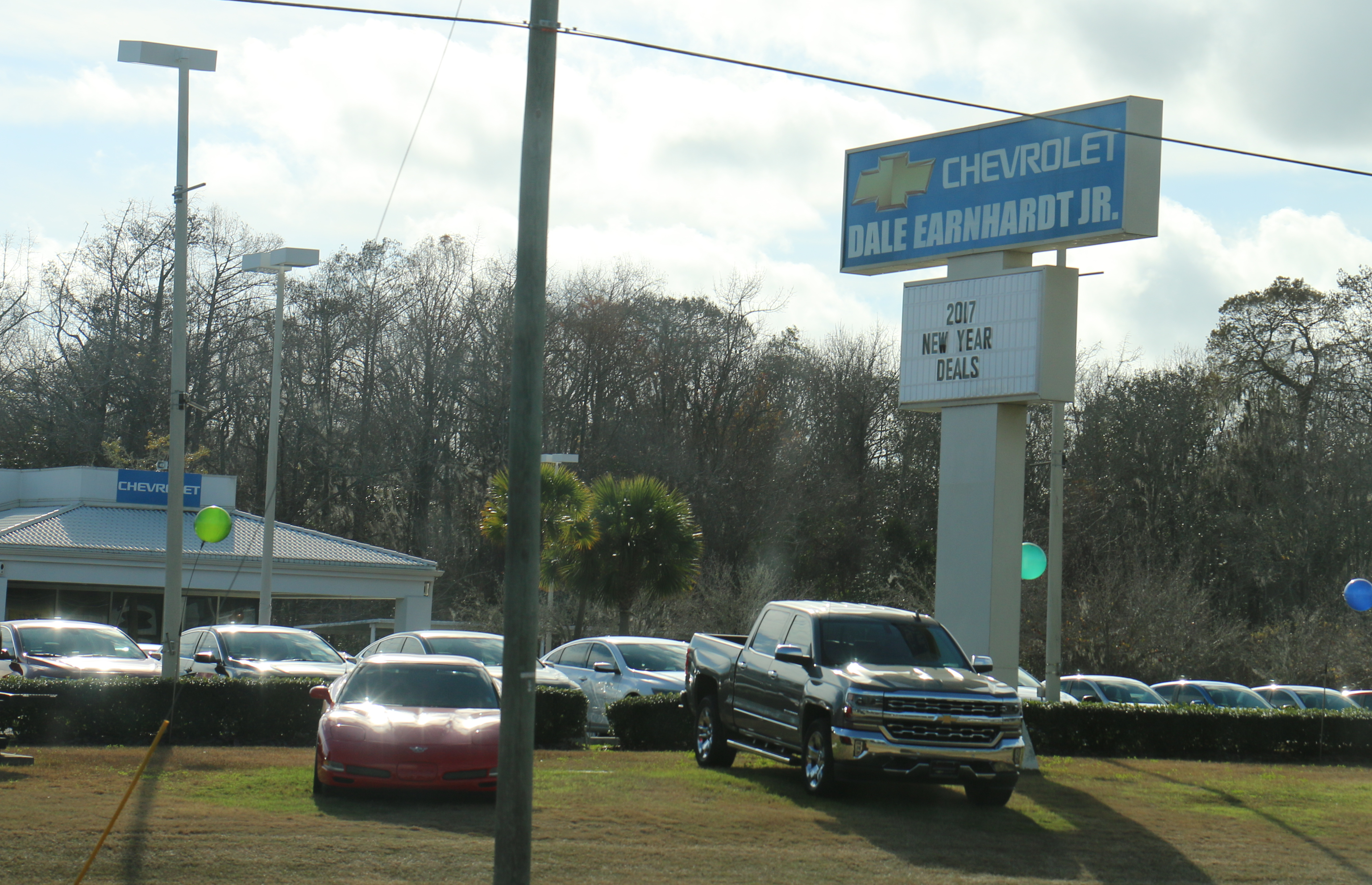
Tallahassee Chevrolet dealership

As of 2013, Earnhardt has his own signature line of eyeglass frames, partnering with NY Eye Inc. In August 2012, he entered the automobile dealer business, opening Dale Earnhardt Jr. Chevrolet and Dale Earnhardt Jr. Buick-GMC-Cadillac in Tallahassee, Florida in association with car owner Rick Hendrick.

Earnhardt co-owns the Whiskey River Beer and Wings restaurants in Charlotte, North Carolina, and at the Charlotte Airport.

Earnhardt is also the co-owner of FilterTime, a residential air filter delivery service, alongside former NASCAR driver Blake Koch.

Earnhardt has been a long-time sim racer. In November 2020, he officially joined iRacing as an executive director and was part of the management committee.

On January 9, 2023, a consortium consisting of Earnhardt's DEJ Management, Jeff Burton Autosports, Inc., Kevin Harvick Incorporated, and Trackhouse Racing Team purchased the CARS Tour.

== In popular media ==
A Dale Jr. autograph

=== Films ===
He was featured in the video Playboy: Celebrity Photographers (2003) where he photographed The Dahm Triplets. He appeared in the 2006 film Talladega Nights: The Ballad of Ricky Bobby. In the movie, he is seen asking Ricky Bobby (Will Ferrell) for his autograph, and tells Ricky "don't tell any of the other drivers." There is also a deleted scene on the DVD where he calls Ricky a "dirty liar" and asks him for money he owed him. The No. 8 car also appeared in Herbie: Fully Loaded in the final race, where Herbie overtook him. The likeness of the 8 car as well as his voice, appeared in the first Cars movie from Disney/Pixar. His No. 88 car also appeared in the 2011 film Transformers: Dark of the Moon as the vehicle form of Roadbuster, one of a trio of NASCAR stock cars equipped with armor and heavy machine guns called the "Wreckers" (the other Wreckers were based on the No. 42 and No. 48 cars driven respectively by Juan Pablo Montoya and Jimmie Johnson). The Wrecker versions of these cars circled the track during the opening pace laps of the 2011 Daytona 500 (Josh Duhamel, Rosie Huntington-Whiteley and Michael Bay were also the grand marshals for that race, in which Earnhardt crashed on lap 203 after making contact with Ryan Newman).

=== Television ===
He hosted Back in the Day, a show that recapped races from the 1960s and 1970s with trivia and information. The show debuted on the Speed Channel on February 6, 2007. He has also appeared in an episode of the TV show Yes, Dear. He has also been on two episodes of MTV Cribs. The first episode originally aired in 2001. The second episode featuring the Western town Earnhardt built originally aired in 2009. His production company, Hammerhead Entertainment also assisted in creating a DirecTV special called "Fast Lane For Fun", in which Earnhardt's Whisky River was shown in one episode. In 2010, he appeared in an episode of Shaq Vs., where he was racing against Shaquille O'Neal. In 2013 Earnhardt made an appearance on the show Fast N' Loud where he requested Richard Rawlings from Gas Monkey Garage to build him a custom-built car for a road trip vacation. He has a home renovation show for the DIY Network called "Renovation Realities: Dale Jr. and Amy". He later voiced Chip Racerson Jr. in one episode of the 2013 animated series Teen Titans Go! called "Teen Titans Vroom!" In 2020, Earnhardt hosted Lost Speedways, a television documentary series that saw him travel to and explore abandoned racetracks across the country.

=== Voice acting ===
- His voice is featured in the video game Scarface: The World is Yours.
- He voiced himself in Disney/Pixar's movie Cars as a No. 8 car (painted in resemblance to Earnhardt's actual car) named "Junior" with the DEI logo on the hood. The Budweiser logos were censored from the No. 8 to prevent alcoholic advertising to gain a "G" (General) rating.
- His voice was used for the character Chase Davis in an episode of the Disney Channel's Handy Manny. Chase helps Manny compete in the Wood Valley 500 auto race in "Handy Manny's Big Race".
- He played himself in "The Hangover: Part Tubbs", a 2013 episode of The Cleveland Show.

=== Music ===
Until its rebranding in 2015, the band Dale Earnhardt Jr. Jr. was named after Earnhardt. Earnhardt is a noted fan of Ellicott City, Maryland rock band The Dangerous Summer and produced the music video for the band's song "Ghosts".

==== Music video appearances ====
He has made appearances in several music videos, including:

- "Show Me What You Got" by Jay-Z, along with Danica Patrick.
- "Anti-Pop" by Matthew Good Band.
- "Steve McQueen" by Sheryl Crow.
- "Rough and Ready" by Trace Adkins.
- "The Road I'm On" by 3 Doors Down, along with Tony Stewart.
- "Right on Time" by O.A.R..
- "Rockstar" by Nickelback.
- "Warrior" by Kid Rock.
- "Back in the Saddle" by Luke Combs, along with Richard Petty

=== Radio ===
Earnhardt hosted a show on Sirius XM Radio's Sirius XM Sports Nation called Dale Earnhardt Jr.'s Unrestricted.

Beginning the 2013 season, Earnhardt's Hammerhead Entertainment and his Dirty Mo Radio podcasting network began producing The Dale Jr. Download, a weekly podcast which recaps his race weekend. It was hosted by Taylor Zarzour and Mike Davis up until the end of the 2016 season. For the 2017 season Dale Jr and his road manager, Tyler Overstreet replaced Davis and Zarzour as the hosts of The Dale Jr. Download. However, Davis continued to make an occasional appearance on the podcast. In 2018, edited versions of The Dale Jr. Download began airing on NBCSN featuring interviews with current and former NASCAR personalities. When NBCSN shut down, the show moved to NBC's Peacock streaming service in 2022.

=== Video games ===
Earnhardt has been featured on the cover of NASCAR-themed video games twice; he appeared on the cover of EA Sports' NASCAR Thunder 2003, and also was voted to be on the cover of NASCAR The Game: Inside Line in 2012.

A long-time member of and advocate for iRacing, Earnhardt joined the service's parent company as executive director in 2020. In 2022, the trophy for the eNASCAR Coca-Cola iRacing Series was renamed in his honor.

== Politics ==
In a 2004 interview with Mike Wallace (not fellow competitor) on 60 Minutes, Earnhardt revealed himself to be a Republican and a supporter of George W. Bush. Despite this, he took his crew out to see the film Fahrenheit 9/11 earlier that year, explaining, "I like hearing both sides of the argument. I thought the movie was well done. But my dad was a Republican, and I'm a Republican, and so [it's] not that I came out of there going, 'I ain't voting for Bush again.' That didn't happen, and I didn't expect that to happen. I just wanted to go and enjoy the movie."

Earnhardt is a longtime opponent of the modern display of the Confederate flag at NASCAR events. He wrote in his 2001 autobiography Driver #8 about his experience being asked about the flag in a Q&A at Richmond International Raceway (now Richmond Raceway) the previous year. "I think it means something different to me than it does to y'all..." he responded. He has distanced himself from race fans who display the flag, explaining, "It never really was me." In 2006, Earnhardt told Dan Wetzel of Yahoo! Sports: "We live in a country where you can speak freely and do as you may. I don't know (if) what that flag stands for is the same for me as it is the guy who might have it flying out there. I am not going to agree with everything everybody does all my life. So I don't have any control over it." Following the Charleston church shooting in 2015, Earnhardt told reporters: "I think it's offensive to an entire race. It does nothing for anybody to be there flying, so I don't see any reason. It belongs in the history books and that's about it."

In January 2009, Earnhardt expressed enthusiasm following Barack Obama's presidential inauguration: "I'm as excited as everybody else is about him. I wish I had been able to go to the inauguration. I would love to meet him. That would be a great honor."

In April 2012, Earnhardt became a partner of the American Coalition for Clean Coal Electricity. He addressed delegates to the 2012 Democratic National Convention at Charlotte Motor Speedway on behalf of the coalition. In 2014, Earnhardt recorded an advertisement for America's Power, encouraging voter turnout for the U.S. elections that year.

In May 2012, Earnhardt singled out Republican Representative Jack Kingston of Georgia while speaking against an amendment to a defense bill that would prohibit the military from funding sponsorships in professional sports.

In January 2017, Earnhardt revealed that his family immigrated from Germany in the 1770s to escape religious persecution, saying "America is created by immigrants." In August, he spoke out against hatred, bigotry and racism following the attacks in Charlottesville, Virginia and Barcelona, Spain. In September, after protests of the U.S. national anthem gained traction following criticism from Donald Trump, Earnhardt expressed support for peaceful protesters, quoting former president John F. Kennedy on Twitter: "Those who make peaceful revolution impossible will make violent revolution inevitable."

== Personal life ==
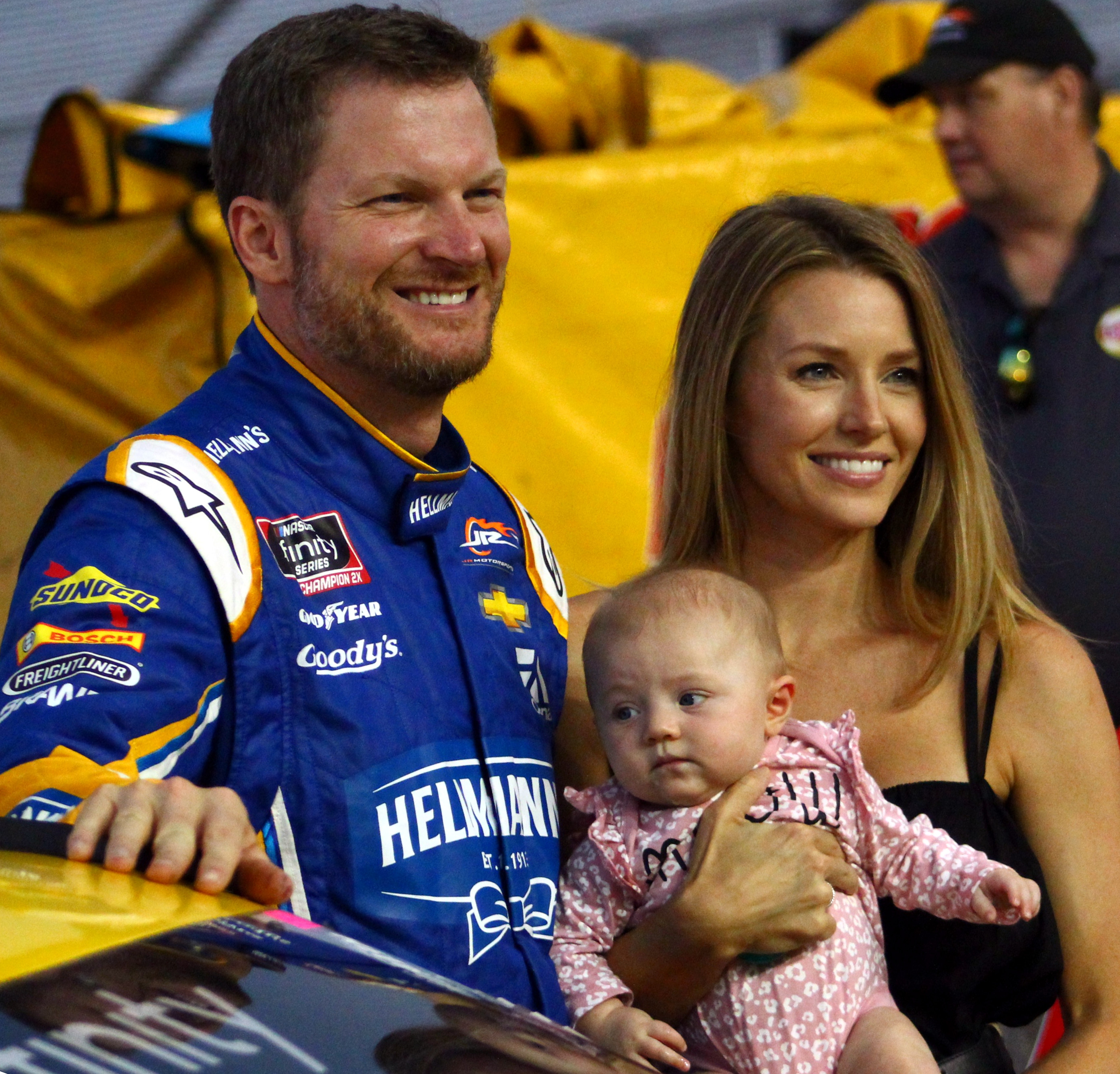
Earnhardt with his family in late 2018

Earnhardt is a passionate Washington Commanders fan and has been known to have their scores relayed to him during races. "During the race season, [if] I'm under caution, I'm getting stats and numbers told to me over the radio during the race," Earnhardt said. "I've got to know. I can't concentrate on what I'm doing if I don't know what the Redskins are doing. My fans tell me if I lose, it ruins their week. But if the Redskins lose, it ruins my week." Earnhardt once dreamed of playing football for Washington, but states that he "wasn't built" for it. "I was 5–3 (5'3", 160 cm) when I got my driver's license at the age of 16," he said, "so I wasn't going to make much of a football player." He currently owns a Learjet 60 private jet with the tail number N8JR.

Earnhardt also owns a yard of wrecked race cars on a property in North Carolina. Some of the most notable cars include Juan Pablo Montoya's 2012 Daytona 500 car that collided with a jet dryer, David Gilliland's 2014 5-hour Energy 400 car that was destroyed in a violent impact with the tri-oval wall, and Earnhardt's own 2014 Duck Commander 500 car that was wrecked from incidental contact with wet infield grass on lap 12 that cut a tire.

On June 17, 2015, Earnhardt announced his engagement to his longtime girlfriend Amy Reimann. After winning his 14th Most Popular Driver Award in 2016, he announced their marriage would take place on New Year's Eve. They got married at Richard Childress' Childress Vineyards in Lexington, North Carolina.

In March 2016, Earnhardt announced that he plans to donate his brain for concussion research when he dies.

In October 2017, Earnhardt revealed that he and his wife were expecting their first child. Their daughter, Isla Rose Earnhardt, was born on April 30, 2018. In March 2020, Earnhardt revealed that he and Amy were expecting their second child. The couple welcomed their second child, Nicole Loraine Earnhardt, on October 12, 2020.

On April 22, 2019, Brenda Jackson, Earnhardt's mother, died at the age of 65 after years of battling cancer. She had served as an accounting specialist for JR Motorsports since 2004.

Earnhardt is a supporter of the Make-A-Wish Foundation and as of March 2018 has granted over 250 wishes. He also founded The Dale JR. Foundation, which is a charity dedicated to giving to underprivileged individuals with a focus on youth.

On August 15, 2019, a Cessna Citation Latitude private jet carrying Earnhardt, his wife Amy, daughter Isla Rose, and dog Gus was involved in a bounced landing at Elizabethton Municipal Airport in Elizabethton, Tennessee and caught fire. None of the passengers were seriously injured. He announced on Twitter about a week after the accident that he still intended to participate in the Xfinity Series one-off entry at Darlington the week afterwards, even though his lower back had gotten sizeable bruises and swelling. Earnhardt finished fifth in the Darlington race after having sufficiently recovered to be taking part in the event, confirming before the race he was feeling great and had been assured there was no risk for him in taking part.

Earnhardt suffers from kosmemophobia, which is a fear of jewelry.

== Motorsports career results ==
=== NASCAR ===
(key) (Bold – Pole position awarded by qualifying time. Italics – Pole position earned by points standings or practice time. * – Most laps led. ** – All laps led.)

==== Monster Energy Cup Series ====
Monster Energy NASCAR Cup Series results
Year	Team	No.	Make	1	2	3	4	5	6	7	8	9	10	11	12	13	14	15	16	17	18	19	20	21	22	23	24	25	26	27	28	29	30	31	32	33	34	35	36	MENCC	Pts	Ref
1999	Dale Earnhardt, Inc.	8	Chevy	DAY	CAR	LVS	ATL	DAR	TEX	BRI	MAR	TAL	CAL	RCH	CLT; 16	DOV	MCH	POC	SON	DAY	NHA; 43	POC	IND	GLN	MCH; 24	BRI	DAR	RCH; 10	NHA	DOV	MAR	CLT	TAL	CAR	PHO	HOM	ATL; 14			48th	500	
2000	Dale Earnhardt, Inc.	8	Chevy	DAY; 13	CAR; 19	LVS; 10	ATL; 29	DAR; 40	BRI; 38	TEX; 1*	MAR; 26	TAL; 42	CAL; 12	RCH; 1	**CLT**; 4*	DOV; 10	MCH; 13	POC; 19	SON; 24	DAY; 35	NHA; 21	POC; 13	IND; 13	GLN; 40	**MCH**; 31	BRI; 21	DAR; 11	RCH; 13	NHA; 31	DOV; 16	MAR; 36	CLT; 19	TAL; 14	CAR; 34	PHO; 27	HOM; 13	ATL; 20			16th	3516	
2001	Dale Earnhardt, Inc.	8	Chevy	DAY; 2	CAR; 43	LVS; 23	ATL; 15	DAR; 34	BRI; 31	**TEX**; 8	MAR; 11	TAL; 8	CAL; 3	RCH; 7	CLT; 25	DOV; 3	MCH; 39	POC; 20	SON; 19	DAY; 1*	CHI; 11	NHA; 9	POC; 2	IND; 10	GLN; 12	MCH; 12	BRI; 14	DAR; 17	RCH; 3	DOV; 1*	KAN; 33	CLT; 4	MAR; 27	TAL; 1*	PHO; 37	CAR; 15	HOM; 15	**ATL**; 7*	NHA; 24	8th	4460	
2002	Dale Earnhardt, Inc.	8	Chevy	DAY; 29	CAR; 26	LVS; 16	ATL; 2	DAR; 4	BRI; 4*	TEX; 42	MAR; 5	TAL; 1*	CAL; 36	RCH; 36	CLT; 35	DOV; 30	POC; 12	MCH; 22	SON; 30	DAY; 6	CHI; 10	NHA; 23	POC; 37	IND; 22	GLN; 35	**MCH**; 10	BRI; 3	DAR; 16	RCH; 4	NHA; 11	DOV; 24	**KAN**; 6	TAL; 1*	CLT; 9	MAR; 4	ATL; 5	CAR; 34	PHO; 5	HOM; 21	11th	4270	
2003	Dale Earnhardt, Inc.	8	Chevy	DAY; 36	CAR; 33	LVS; 2*	ATL; 3	DAR; 6*	BRI; 16	TEX; 2	TAL; 1	MAR; 3*	CAL; 6	RCH; 3	CLT; 41	DOV; 11	POC; 4	MCH; 7	SON; 11	DAY; 7	CHI; 38	NHA; 6	POC; 3	IND; 14	GLN; 3	MCH; 32	BRI; 9	DAR; 25	RCH; 17	NHA; 5	DOV; 37	TAL; 2	KAN; 18	CLT; 9	MAR; 4	ATL; 6	PHO; 1	CAR; 13	HOM; 24	3rd	4815	
2004	Dale Earnhardt, Inc.	8	Chevy	DAY; 1	CAR; 5	LVS; 35	ATL; 1	DAR; 10	BRI; 11	TEX; 4	MAR; 3	TAL; 2	CAL; 9	RCH; 1*	CLT; 6	DOV; 3	POC; 6	MCH; 21	SON; 11	DAY; 3	CHI; 22	NHA; 31	POC; 25	IND; 27	GLN; 5	MCH; 21	BRI; 1*	CAL; 34	RCH; 2	NHA; 3	DOV; 9	TAL; 1*	KAN; 9	CLT; 3	MAR; 33	ATL; 33	PHO; 1*	DAR; 11	HOM; 23	5th	6368	
2005	Dale Earnhardt, Inc.	8	Chevy	DAY; 3	CAL; 32	LVS; 42	ATL; 24	BRI; 4	MAR; 13	TEX; 9	PHO; 4	TAL; 15	DAR; 8	RCH; 14	CLT; 33	DOV; 22	POC; 33	MCH; 17	SON; 42	DAY; 3	CHI; 1	NHA; 9	POC; 32	IND; 43	GLN; 10	MCH; 18	BRI; 9	CAL; 38	RCH; 20	NHA; 5	DOV; 31	TAL; 40	KAN; 34	CLT; 42	MAR; 18	ATL; 4*	TEX; 8	PHO; 40	HOM; 19	19th	3780	
2006	Dale Earnhardt, Inc.	8	Chevy	DAY; 8*	CAL; 11	LVS; 27	ATL; 3	BRI; 11	MAR; 4	TEX; 12	PHO; 23	TAL; 31	RCH; 1	DAR; 5	CLT; 11	DOV; 10	POC; 14	MCH; 3	SON; 26	DAY; 13	CHI; 5	NHA; 43	POC; 43	IND; 6	GLN; 18	MCH; 6	BRI; 3	CAL; 2	RCH; 17	NHA; 13	DOV; 21	KAN; 10	TAL; 23*	CLT; 4	MAR; 22	ATL; 3	TEX; 6	PHO; 9	HOM; 19	5th	6328	
2007	Dale Earnhardt, Inc.	8	Chevy	DAY; 32	CAL; 40	LVS; 11	ATL; 14	BRI; 7	MAR; 5	TEX; 36	PHO; 19	TAL; 7	RCH; 13	DAR; 8	CLT; 8	DOV; 22	POC; 12	MCH; 5	SON; 13	NHA; 4*	DAY; 36	CHI; 19	IND; 34	**POC**; 2	GLN; 42	MCH; 12	BRI; 5	CAL; 5	RCH; 30	NHA; 16	DOV; 3	KAN; 10	TAL; 40	CLT; 19	MAR; 23	ATL; 25	TEX; 14	PHO; 43	HOM; 36	16th	3929	
2008	Hendrick Motorsports	88	Chevy	DAY; 9	CAL; 40	LVS; 2	ATL; 3	BRI; 5	MAR; 6*	**TEX**; 12	PHO; 7	TAL; 10	RCH; 15	DAR; 4	CLT; 5*	DOV; 35	POC; 4	MCH; 1	SON; 12	NHA; 24	DAY; 8*	CHI; 16	IND; 12	POC; 12	GLN; 22	MCH; 23	BRI; 18	CAL; 11	RCH; 4	NHA; 5	DOV; 24	KAN; 13	TAL; 28	CLT; 36	MAR; 2	ATL; 11	TEX; 20	PHO; 6	HOM; 41	12th	6127	
2009	Hendrick Motorsports	88	Chevy	DAY; 27	CAL; 39	LVS; 10	ATL; 11	BRI; 14	MAR; 8	TEX; 20	PHO; 31	TAL; 2	RCH; 27	DAR; 27	CLT; 40	DOV; 12	POC; 27	MCH; 14	SON; 26	NHA; 13	DAY; 39	CHI; 15	IND; 36	POC; 28	GLN; 39	MCH; 3	BRI; 9	ATL; 17	RCH; 21	NHA; 35	DOV; 20	KAN; 36	CAL; 25	CLT; 38	MAR; 29	TAL; 11	TEX; 25	PHO; 35	HOM; 28	25th	3422	
2010	Hendrick Motorsports	88	Chevy	DAY; 2	CAL; 32	LVS; 16	**ATL**; 15	BRI; 7	MAR; 15	PHO; 12	TEX; 8	TAL; 13	RCH; 32	DAR; 18	DOV; 30	CLT; 22	POC; 19	MCH; 7	SON; 11	NHA; 8	DAY; 4	CHI; 23	IND; 27	POC; 27	GLN; 26	MCH; 19	BRI; 13	ATL; 22	RCH; 34	NHA; 4	DOV; 23	KAN; 22	CAL; 16	CLT; 29	MAR; 7	TAL; 39*	TEX; 25	PHO; 14	HOM; 27	21st	3953	
2011	Hendrick Motorsports	88	Chevy	**DAY**; 24	PHO; 10	LVS; 8	BRI; 11	CAL; 12	MAR; 2	TEX; 9	TAL; 4	RCH; 19	DAR; 14	DOV; 12	CLT; 7	KAN; 2	POC; 6	MCH; 21	SON; 41	DAY; 19	KEN; 30	NHA; 15	IND; 16	POC; 9	GLN; 14	MCH; 14	BRI; 16	ATL; 19	RCH; 16	CHI; 3	NHA; 17	DOV; 24	KAN; 14	CLT; 19	TAL; 25	MAR; 7	TEX; 7	PHO; 24	HOM; 11	7th	2290	
2012	Hendrick Motorsports	88	Chevy	DAY; 2	PHO; 14	LVS; 10	BRI; 15	CAL; 3	MAR; 3	TEX; 10	KAN; 7	RCH; 2	TAL; 9	DAR; 17	CLT; 6	DOV; 4	POC; 8	MCH; 1*	SON; 23	KEN; 4	DAY; 15	NHA; 4	IND; 4	POC; 32	GLN; 28	MCH; 4	BRI; 12	ATL; 7	**RCH**; 14	CHI; 8	NHA; 13	DOV; 11	TAL; 20	CLT	KAN	MAR; 21	TEX; 7	PHO; 21	HOM; 10	12th	2245	
2013	Hendrick Motorsports	88	Chevy	DAY; 2	PHO; 5	LVS; 7	BRI; 6	CAL; 2	MAR; 24	TEX; 29	KAN; 16	RCH; 10	TAL; 17	DAR; 9	CLT; 39	DOV; 10	POC; 3	MCH; 37	SON; 12	**KEN**; 12	DAY; 8	NHA; 14	IND; 6	POC; 5	GLN; 30	MCH; 36	BRI; 10	ATL; 8	RCH; 13	CHI; 35	NHA; 6	**DOV**; 2	KAN; 8	CLT; 15	TAL; 2	MAR; 8	TEX; 2	PHO; 4	HOM; 3	5th	2363	
2014	Hendrick Motorsports	88	Chevy	DAY; 1*	PHO; 2	LVS; 2	BRI; 24	CAL; 12	MAR; 3	TEX; 43	DAR; 2	RCH; 7	TAL; 26	KAN; 5	CLT; 19	DOV; 9	POC; 1	MCH; 7	SON; 3	KEN; 5	DAY; 14	NHA; 10	IND; 9	POC; 1	GLN; 11	MCH; 5	BRI; 39	ATL; 11	RCH; 12	CHI; 11	NHA; 9	DOV; 17	KAN; 39	CLT; 20	TAL; 31	MAR; 1	TEX; 6	PHO; 8	HOM; 14	8th	2301	
2015	Hendrick Motorsports	88	Chevy	DAY; 3	ATL; 3	LVS; 4	PHO; 43	CAL; 6	MAR; 36	TEX; 3	BRI; 16	RCH; 14	TAL; 1*	KAN; 3	CLT; 3	DOV; 14	POC; 11	MCH; 2	SON; 7	DAY; 1*	KEN; 21	NHA; 5	IND; 22	POC; 4	GLN; 11	MCH; 10	BRI; 9	DAR; 8	RCH; 5	CHI; 12	NHA; 25	DOV; 3	CLT; 28	KAN; 21	TAL; 2*	MAR; 4	TEX; 6	PHO; 1	HOM; 40	12th	2310	
2016	Hendrick Motorsports	88	Chevy	DAY; 36	ATL; 2	LVS; 8	PHO; 5	CAL; 11	MAR; 14	TEX; 2	BRI; 2	RCH; 13	TAL; 40	KAN; 15	DOV; 32	CLT; 14	POC; 2	MCH; 39	SON; 11	DAY; 21	KEN; 13	NHA	IND	POC	GLN	BRI	MCH	DAR	RCH	CHI	NHA	DOV	CLT	KAN	TAL	MAR	TEX	PHO	HOM	32nd	461	
2017	Hendrick Motorsports	88	Chevy	DAY; 37	ATL; 30	LVS; 16	PHO; 14	CAL; 16	MAR; 34	TEX; 5	BRI; 38	RCH; 30	TAL; 22	KAN; 20	CLT; 10	DOV; 11	POC; 38	MCH; 9	SON; 6	**DAY**; 32	KEN; 12	NHA; 18	IND; 36	POC; 12	GLN; 37	MCH; 14	BRI; 23	DAR; 22	RCH; 13	CHI; 17	NHA; 34	DOV; 7	CLT; 12	**TAL**; 7	KAN; 7	MAR; 11	TEX; 35	PHO; 10	HOM; 25	21st	668	

===== Daytona 500 =====
Year	Team	Manufacturer	Start	Finish
2000	Dale Earnhardt, Inc.	Chevrolet	8	13
2001	Dale Earnhardt, Inc.	Chevrolet	6	2
2002	Dale Earnhardt, Inc.	Chevrolet	5	29
2003	Dale Earnhardt, Inc.	Chevrolet	2	36
2004	Dale Earnhardt, Inc.	Chevrolet	3	**1**
2005	Dale Earnhardt, Inc.	Chevrolet	5	3
2006	Dale Earnhardt, Inc.	Chevrolet	7	8
2007	Dale Earnhardt, Inc.	Chevrolet	5	32
2008	Hendrick Motorsports	Chevrolet	3	9
2009	Hendrick Motorsports	Chevrolet	14	27
2010	Hendrick Motorsports	Chevrolet	2	2
2011	Hendrick Motorsports	Chevrolet	**1**	24
2012	Hendrick Motorsports	Chevrolet	5	2
2013	Hendrick Motorsports	Chevrolet	18	2
2014	Hendrick Motorsports	Chevrolet	9	**1**
2015	Hendrick Motorsports	Chevrolet	3	3
2016	Hendrick Motorsports	Chevrolet	3	36
2017	Hendrick Motorsports	Chevrolet	2	37

==== Xfinity Series ====
NASCAR Xfinity Series results
Year	Team	No.	Make	1	2	3	4	5	6	7	8	9	10	11	12	13	14	15	16	17	18	19	20	21	22	23	24	25	26	27	28	29	30	31	32	33	34	35	NXSC	Pts	Ref
1996	Dale Earnhardt, Inc.	31	Chevy	DAY	CAR	RCH	ATL	NSV	DAR	BRI	HCY	NZH	CLT	DOV	SBO	MYB; 14	GLN	MLW	NHA	TAL	IRP	MCH	BRI	DAR	RCH	DOV	CLT	CAR	HOM										77th	121	
1997	Dale Earnhardt, Inc.	31	Chevy	DAY	CAR	RCH	ATL	LVS	DAR	HCY; DNQ	TEX	BRI	NSV; 39	TAL	NHA	NZH	CLT	DOV	SBO	GLN; 39	MLW	MYB	GTW; 38	IRP	MCH; 7					CLT; DNQ		ROK; 16	HOM; 13						47th	684	
1997	Wellrich Motorsports	7	Chevy																							BRI; 22	DAR	RCH	DOV		CAL; 34								47th	684	
1998	Dale Earnhardt, Inc.	3	Chevy	DAY; 37	CAR; 16	LVS; 2	NSV; 3	DAR; 10	**BRI**; 2	TEX; 1	HCY; 8	TAL; 32	NHA; 10	**NZH**; 28	CLT; 30	DOV; 1*	RCH; 2*	PPR; 10	GLN; 8	MLW; 1*	MYB; 5	CAL; 1*	**SBO**; 13*	IRP; 1*	MCH; 5	BRI; 15	DAR; 2	RCH; 1*	DOV; 8	CLT; 3*	GTW; 1	CAR; 14	ATL; 2*	HOM; 42					1st	4469	
1999	Dale Earnhardt, Inc.	3	Chevy	DAY; 14	**CAR**; 35	LVS; 6	ATL; 3	DAR; 11	TEX; 10	**NSV**; 9	BRI; 2	TAL; 6	**CAL**; 3*	NHA; 34	RCH; 32	NZH; 2	CLT; 2	DOV; 1*	**SBO**; 1	GLN; 1	MLW; 3	**MYB**; 25	PPR; 36	GTW; 1*	IRP; 5	MCH; 1*	BRI; 3	DAR; 12	RCH; 1	DOV; 33	CLT; 5	CAR; 13	MEM; 2	PHO; 2	HOM; 2*				1st	4647	
2001	NEMCO Motorsports	87	Chevy	DAY	CAR	LVS	ATL	DAR	BRI	TEX	NSH	TAL	CAL	RCH	NHA	NZH	CLT; 29	DOV	KEN	MLW	GLN	CHI	GTW	PPR	IRP	MCH	BRI	DAR	RCH	DOV	KAN	CLT	MEM	PHO	CAR	HOM			118th	76	
2002	Richard Childress Racing	3	Chevy	DAY; 1*	CAR	LVS	DAR	BRI	TEX	NSH	TAL	CAL	RCH	NHA	NZH	CLT; 36	DOV	NSH	KEN	MLW	DAY	CHI	GTW	PPR	IRP	MCH	BRI	DAR											60th	425	
2002	Dale Earnhardt, Inc.	8	Chevy																										**RCH**; 1*	DOV	KAN	CLT	MEM	ATL	CAR	PHO	HOM		60th	425	
2003	Chance 2 Motorsports	8	Chevy	DAY; 1*	CAR	LVS	DAR	BRI	TEX	TAL; 1*	NSH	CAL	RCH	GTW	NZH	CLT	DOV	NSH	KEN	MLW	**DAY**; 1**	CHI	NHA	PPR	IRP	MCH	BRI	DAR	RCH	DOV	KAN	CLT	MEM	ATL	PHO	CAR	HOM		66th	555	
2004	Dale Earnhardt, Inc.	8	Chevy	DAY; 1*	CAR	LVS	DAR	BRI	TEX	NSH																													49th	677	
2004	Chance 2 Motorsports	81	Chevy								TAL; 2*	CAL	GTW	RCH	NZH	CLT	DOV	NSH	KEN	MLW	DAY; 17	CHI	NHA	PPR	IRP	MCH	**BRI**; 1*	CAL	RCH	DOV	KAN	CLT	MEM	ATL	PHO	DAR	HOM		49th	677	
2005	Chance 2 Motorsports	81	Chevy	DAY; 3	CAL	MXC	LVS	ATL	NSH	BRI	TEX	PHO	TAL	DAR	RCH	CLT	DOV	NSH	KEN	MLW	DAY; 40	CHI	NHA	PPR	GTW	IRP	GLN	MCH	BRI; 7	CAL	RCH	DOV	KAN	CLT; 39	MEM	TEX	PHO	HOM	75th	410	
2006	Dale Earnhardt, Inc.	8	Chevy	DAY; 17	CAL	MXC	LVS	ATL	BRI	TEX	NSH	PHO	TAL	RCH	DAR	CLT	DOV	NSH	KEN	MLW	DAY; 1*	CHI; 15	NHA	MAR	GTW	IRP	GLN	MCH; 1	BRI	CAL	RCH	DOV	KAN	CLT	MEM	TEX	PHO	HOM; 7	53rd	761	
2007	Dale Earnhardt, Inc.	8	Chevy	DAY; 7	CAL	MXC	LVS	ATL	BRI; 6	NSH	TEX	PHO	TAL; 29	RCH	DAR	CLT	DOV	NSH	KEN	MLW	NHA													CLT; 3	MEM	TEX	PHO	HOM	60th	668	
2007	JR Motorsports	88	Chevy																			DAY; 14	CHI	GTW	IRP	CGV	GLN	MCH	BRI	CAL	RCH	DOV	KAN						60th	668	
2008	JR Motorsports	5	Chevy	DAY; 3	CAL; 7	LVS	ATL; 15	BRI	NSH	TEX; 7	PHO	MXC	TAL; 6	RCH	DAR							DAY; 3	CHI	GTW	IRP	CGV	GLN; 30	MCH	BRI	CAL	RCH	DOV	KAN	CLT	MEM	TEX	PHO	HOM; 3	42nd	1235	
2008	JR Motorsports	83	Chevy													CLT; 4	DOV	NSH	KEN	MLW	NHA																		42nd	1235	
2009	JR Motorsports	5	Chevy	DAY; 7	CAL	LVS; 5	BRI	TEX; 20	NSH	PHO	TAL; 5	RCH	DAR	CLT; 13	DOV	NSH	KEN	MLW	NHA	DAY; 40	CHI	GTW	IRP	IOW	GLN	MCH	BRI	CGV	**ATL**; 3	RCH	DOV	KAN	CAL	CLT	MEM	TEX	PHO	HOM	51st	901	
2010	JR Motorsports	88	Chevy	DAY; 29	CAL	LVS	BRI	NSH	PHO	TEX	TAL	RCH	DAR	DOV	CLT	NSH	KEN	ROA	NHA								BRI; 4	CGV	ATL	RCH	DOV	KAN	CAL	CLT	GTW	TEX	PHO	HOM	73rd	436	
2010	Richard Childress Racing	3	Chevy																	DAY; 1*	CHI	GTW	IRP	IOW	GLN	MCH													73rd	436	
2011	JR Motorsports	5	Chevy	DAY; 4	PHO	LVS	BRI; 3	CAL	TEX																														105th	0^{1}	
2011	JR Motorsports	7	Chevy							TAL; 8	NSH	RCH	DAR	DOV	IOW	CLT	CHI	MCH	ROA	DAY	KEN	NHA	NSH	IRP	IOW	GLN	CGV	BRI	ATL	RCH	CHI	DOV	KAN	CLT	TEX	PHO	HOM		105th	0^{1}	
2012	JR Motorsports	5	Chevy	DAY; 15	PHO	LVS	BRI; 5	CAL	TEX; 14	RCH	TAL; 4	DAR	IOW	CLT	DOV	MCH	ROA	KEN	DAY	NHA	CHI	IND	IOW	GLN	CGV	BRI	ATL	RCH	CHI	KEN	DOV	CLT	KAN	TEX	PHO	HOM			117th	0^{1}	
2013	JR Motorsports	88	Chevy	DAY; 4	PHO	LVS; 14	BRI	CAL	TEX; 4	RCH	TAL	DAR	CLT	DOV	IOW	MCH	ROA	KEN	DAY	NHA	CHI	IND	IOW	GLN	MOH	BRI	ATL	RCH	CHI; 5	KEN	DOV	KAN	CLT	TEX	PHO	HOM			103rd	0^{1}	
2014	JR Motorsports	88	Chevy	DAY; 11	PHO	LVS; 4	BRI	CAL	TEX; 5	DAR	RCH	TAL	IOW	CLT	DOV	MCH; 3	ROA	KEN	DAY	NHA	CHI	IND	IOW	GLN	MOH	BRI	ATL	RCH	CHI	KEN	DOV	KAN	CLT	TEX	PHO	HOM			88th	0^{1}	
2015	JR Motorsports	88	Chevy	DAY; 10	ATL	LVS; 12	PHO	CAL	TEX; 3	BRI	RCH	TAL	IOW	CLT	DOV	MCH	CHI	DAY	KEN; 8	NHA	IND	IOW	GLN	MOH	BRI	ROA	DAR	RCH	CHI	KEN	DOV	CLT	KAN	TEX	PHO	HOM			91st	0^{1}	
2016	JR Motorsports	88	Chevy	DAY	ATL	LVS	PHO	CAL	TEX; 5	BRI	RCH; 1*	TAL	DOV	CLT	POC	MCH	IOW	DAY	KEN	NHA	IND	IOW	GLN	MOH	BRI	ROA	DAR	RCH	CHI	KEN	DOV	CLT	KAN	TEX	PHO	HOM			91st	0^{1}	
2017	JR Motorsports	88	Chevy	DAY	ATL	LVS	PHO	CAL	TEX	BRI	TAL	RCH	CLT	DOV	POC	MCH	IOW	DAY	KEN	NHA	IND	IOW	GLN	MOH	BRI; 13	ROA	DAR	RCH; 9	CHI	KEN	DOV	CLT	KAN	TEX	PHO	HOM			101st	0^{1}	
2018	JR Motorsports	88	Chevy	DAY	ATL	LVS	PHO	CAL	TEX	BRI	RCH	TAL	DOV	CLT	POC	MCH	IOW	CHI	DAY	KEN	NHA	IOW	GLN	MOH	BRI	ROA	DAR	IND	LVS	RCH; 4*	ROV	DOV	KAN	TEX	PHO	HOM			50th	51	
2019	JR Motorsports	8	Chevy	DAY	ATL	LVS	PHO	CAL	TEX	BRI	RCH	TAL	DOV	CLT	POC	MCH	IOW	CHI	DAY	KEN	NHA	IOW	GLN	MOH	BRI	ROA	DAR; 5	IND	LVS	RCH	ROV	DOV	KAN	TEX	PHO	HOM			52nd	41	
2020	JR Motorsports	8	Chevy	DAY	LVS	CAL	PHO	DAR	CLT	BRI	ATL	HOM; 5	HOM	TAL	POC	IRC	KEN	KEN	TEX	KAN	ROA	DRC	DOV	DOV	DAY	DAR	RCH	RCH	BRI	LVS	TAL	ROV	KAN	TEX	MAR	PHO			51st	43	
2021	JR Motorsports	8	Chevy	DAY	DRC	HOM	LVS	PHO	ATL	MAR	TAL	DAR	DOV	COA	CLT	MOH	TEX	NSH	POC	ROA	ATL	NHA	GLN	IRC	MCH	DAY	DAR	RCH; 14	BRI	LVS	TAL	ROV	TEX	KAN	MAR	PHO			61st	23	
2022	JR Motorsports	88	Chevy	DAY	CAL	LVS	PHO	ATL	COA	RCH	MAR; 11	TAL	DOV	DAR	TEX	CLT	PIR	NSH	ROA	ATL	NHA	POC	IRC	MCH	GLN	DAY	DAR	KAN	BRI	TEX	TAL	ROV	LVS	HOM	MAR	PHO			58th	26	
2023	JR Motorsports	88	Chevy	DAY	CAL	LVS	PHO	ATL	COA	RCH	MAR	TAL	DOV	DAR	CLT	PIR	SON	NSH	CSC	ATL	NHA	POC	ROA	MCH	IRC	GLN	DAY	DAR	KAN	BRI; 30	TEX	ROV	LVS	HOM; 5	MAR	PHO			48th	48	
2024	JR Motorsports	88	Chevy	DAY	ATL	LVS	PHO	COA	RCH	MAR	TEX	TAL	DOV	DAR	CLT	PIR	SON	IOW	NHA	NSH	CSC	POC	IND	MCH	DAY	DAR	ATL	GLN	BRI; 7	KAN	TAL	ROV	LVS	HOM	MAR	PHO			55th	32	

^{*} Season still in progress
^{1} Ineligible for series points

=== CARS Late Model Stock Car Tour ===
(key) (Bold – Pole position awarded by qualifying time. Italics – Pole position earned by points standings or practice time. * – Most laps led. ** – All laps led.)

CARS Late Model Stock Car Tour results
Year	Team	No.	Make	1	2	3	4	5	6	7	8	9	10	11	12	13	14	15	16	17	CLMSCTC	Pts	Ref
2022	JR Motorsports	3	Chevy	CRW	HCY	GPS	AAS	FCS	LGY	DOM	HCY	ACE	MMS	NWS; 3	TCM	ACE	SBO	CRW			45th	30	
2023	JR Motorsports	3	Chevy	SNM	FLC	HCY	ACE	NWS; 16	LGY	DOM	CRW	HCY	ACE	TCM	WKS	AAS	SBO	TCM	CRW		62nd	17	
2024	JR Motorsports	3	Chevy	SNM	HCY	AAS; 14	OCS	ACE	TCM	LGY	DOM	CRW	HCY	NWS	ACE	WKS	FLC; 10	SBO	TCM	NWS	N/A	0	
2025	JR Motorsports	8	Chevy	AAS	WCS	CDL; 21	OCS	ACE	NWS	LGY	DOM	CRW	HCY	AND; 10	FLC; 18	SBO	TCM; 12	NWS			28th	108	
2026	JR Motorsports	8	Chevy	SNM	WCS	NSV; 12	CRW	ACE	LGY	DOM	NWS	HCY	AND	FLC	TCM	NPS; 9	SBO				46th	63	

=== CARS Pro Late Model Tour ===
(key)

CARS Pro Late Model Tour results
Year	Team	No.	Make	1	2	3	4	5	6	7	8	9	10	11	CPLMTC	Pts	Ref
2026	GMS Race Cars	23	Chevy	SNM	NSV	CRW	ACE	NWS	HCY	AND	FLC; 2	TCM	NPS	SBO	37th	40	

=== International Race of Champions ===
(key) (Bold – Pole position. * – Most laps led.)

International Race of Champions results
Year	Make	1	2	3	4	Pos.	Pts	Ref
1999	Pontiac	DAY; 10	TAL; 12	MCH; 2	IND; 11	9th	29	
2000	Pontiac	DAY; 5	TAL; 11	MCH; 8	IND; 9	10th	29	

=== 24 Hours of Daytona ===
(key)

24 Hours of Daytona results
Year	Class	No	Team	Car	Co-drivers	Laps	Position	Class Pos.
2001	GTS	3	(United States) Corvette Racing	Chevrolet Corvette C5-R	(United Kingdom) Andy Pilgrim (United States) Dale Earnhardt (United States) Kelly Collins	642	4	2
2004	DP	2	(United States) Howard-Boss Motorsports	Crawford DP03-Chevrolet	(United Kingdom) Andy Wallace (United States) Tony Stewart	519	5 ^{DNF}	3 ^{DNF}

Sporting positions
Preceded by Randy LaJoie	NASCAR Busch Series Champion; 1998, 1999	Succeeded by Jeff Green
Achievements
Preceded by Terry Labonte	The Winston winner 2000	Succeeded by Jeff Gordon
Preceded by Tony Stewart	Budweiser Shootout winner 2003; 2008	Succeeded by Dale Jarrett; Kevin Harvick
Preceded by Michael Waltrip; Jimmie Johnson	Daytona 500 winner 2004; 2014	Succeeded by Jeff Gordon; Joey Logano
Awards
Preceded by Bill Elliott	NASCAR Sprint Cup Series Most Popular Driver; 2003–2017	Succeeded by Chase Elliott
Preceded by Jeff Gordon	NASCAR EA cover athlete 2003	Succeeded by Tony Stewart
Preceded by Jimmie Johnson Mark Martin	NASCAR The Game cover athlete 2012	Succeeded by Tony Stewart
Preceded by Tony Stewart	NASCAR Myers Brothers Award; 2014	Succeeded by Darlington Raceway
