= Career results of Jimmie Johnson =

Jimmie Kenneth Johnson (born September 17, 1975) is an American professional stock car racing driver and team owner. He competes part-time in the NASCAR Cup Series, driving the No. 84 Toyota Camry XSE for Legacy Motor Club, a team that he co-owns with Maury Gallagher and with Richard Petty as team ambassador. He is a seven-time Cup Series champion, tied with Petty and Dale Earnhardt for the most all-time. Johnson's first five Cup Series championships from (2006 to 2010) were won consecutively. His successes have caused many analysts and fellow drivers to consider him one of the greatest NASCAR drivers of all time. Johnson drove the No. 48 Chevrolet for Hendrick Motorsports for his entire full-time Cup Series career from 2002 to 2020 NASCAR Cup Series.

After retiring from full-time NASCAR competition after the 2020 season, Johnson made starts in the NTT IndyCar Series, driving the No. 48 Honda part-time in 2021 and full-time in 2022 for Chip Ganassi Racing and also competed in the IMSA WeatherTech SportsCar Championship, driving the No. 48 Cadillac on a part-time schedule for Ally Cadillac Racing.

== Career summary ==
Season	Series	Team	Races	Wins	Top 5	Top 10	Poles	Points	Position
1998	ASA National Tour	Herzog Motorsports	20	0	6	15	1	2975	4th
1998	NASCAR Busch Series	ST Motorsports	2	0	0	0	0	275	67th
1998	NASCAR Busch Series	Curb Agajanian Performance Group	1	0	0	0	0	275	67th
1999	ASA National Tour	Herzog Motorsports	20	2	11	16	3	3198	3rd
1999	NASCAR Busch Series	Herzog Motorsports	5	0	0	1	0	521	63rd
2000	NASCAR Busch Series	Herzog Motorsports	31	0	0	6	0	3264	10th
2001	NASCAR Busch Series	Herzog Motorsports	33	1	4	9	0	3871	8th
2001	NASCAR Winston Cup Series	Hendrick Motorsports	3	0	0	0	0	210	52nd
2002	NASCAR Winston Cup Series	Hendrick Motorsports	36	3	6	21	4	4600	5th
2003	NASCAR Winston Cup Series	Hendrick Motorsports	36	3	14	20	2	4932	2nd
2003	International Race of Champions	NASCAR	4	1	2	4	0	56	3rd
2004	NASCAR Nextel Cup Series	Hendrick Motorsports	36	8	20	23	1	6498	2nd
2004	NASCAR Busch Series	Hendrick Motorsports	1	0	1	1	0	170	98th
2004	International Race of Champions	NASCAR	4	0	3	4	0	54	4th
2004	Rolex Sports Car Series	Howard-Boss Motorsports	1	0	0	0	0	23	65th
2005	NASCAR Nextel Cup Series	Hendrick Motorsports	36	4	13	22	1	6406	5th
2005	NASCAR Busch Series	Hendrick Motorsports	8	0	2	2	2	876	53rd
2005	Rolex Sports Car Series	Howard-Boss Motorsports	1	0	1	1	0	70	32nd
2006	NASCAR Nextel Cup Series	Hendrick Motorsports	36	5	13	24	1	6475	1st
2006	NASCAR Busch Series	Hendrick Motorsports	3	0	0	1	0	283	84th
2007	NASCAR Nextel Cup Series	Hendrick Motorsports	36	10	20	24	4	6723	1st
2007	NASCAR Busch Series	Hendrick Motorsports	3	0	1	2	0	387	82nd
2007	Rolex Sports Car Series	Riley-Matthews Motorsports	2	0	0	0	0	34	57th
2008	NASCAR Sprint Cup Series	Hendrick Motorsports	36	7	15	22	6	6684	1st
2008	NASCAR Nationwide Series	JR Motorsports	4	0	0	1	0	396	69th
2008	NASCAR Craftsman Truck Series	Randy Moss Motorsports	1	0	0	0	0	64	104th
2008	Rolex Sports Car Series	Bob Stallings Racing	1	0	1	1	0	32	56th
2009	NASCAR Sprint Cup Series	Hendrick Motorsports	36	7	16	24	4	6652	1st
2009	Rolex Sports Car Series	Bob Stallings Racing	1	0	0	0	0	24	54th
2010	NASCAR Sprint Cup Series	Hendrick Motorsports	36	6	17	23	3	6622	1st
2010	Rolex Sports Car Series	Bob Stallings Racing	2	0	0	0	0	48	30th
2011	NASCAR Sprint Cup Series	Hendrick Motorsports	36	2	14	21	1	2304	6th
2011	NASCAR Nationwide Series	JR Motorsports	1	0	1	1	0	0	104th
2011	Rolex Sports Car Series	Bob Stallings Racing	1	0	0	0	0	19	59th
2012	NASCAR Sprint Cup Series	Hendrick Motorsports	36	5	18	24	4	2360	3rd
2013	NASCAR Sprint Cup Series	Hendrick Motorsports	36	6	16	24	4	2419	1st
2013	NASCAR Nationwide Series	JR Motorsports	1	0	0	0	0	0	111th
2014	NASCAR Sprint Cup Series	Hendrick Motorsports	36	4	11	20	1	2274	11th
2015	NASCAR Sprint Cup Series	Hendrick Motorsports	36	5	14	22	1	2315	10th
2016	NASCAR Sprint Cup Series	Hendrick Motorsports	36	5	11	16	1	5040	1st
2017	Monster Energy NASCAR Cup Series	Hendrick Motorsports	36	3	4	11	1	2260	10th
2018	Monster Energy NASCAR Cup Series	Hendrick Motorsports	36	0	2	11	0	2242	14th
2019	Monster Energy NASCAR Cup Series	Hendrick Motorsports	36	0	3	12	1	835	18th
2020	NASCAR Cup Series	Hendrick Motorsports	35	0	5	10	0	836	18th
2021	IndyCar Series	Chip Ganassi Racing	12	0	0	0	0	108	26th
2021	IMSA SportsCar Championship - DPi	Ally Cadillac Racing	5	0	3	5	0	1203	12th
2022	IndyCar Series	Chip Ganassi Racing	17	0	1	2	0	214	21st
2022	IMSA SportsCar Championship - DPi	Ally Cadillac	3	0	2	3	0	889	12th
2023	NASCAR Cup Series	Legacy Motor Club	3	0	0	0	0	12	39th
2023	24 Hours of Le Mans	Hendrick Motorsports	1	0	0	0	0	-	39th
2024	NASCAR Cup Series	Legacy Motor Club	9	0	0	0	0	39	38th
2025	NASCAR Cup Series	Legacy Motor Club	2	0	1	1	0	35	38th
2026	NASCAR Cup Series	Legacy Motor Club	2	0	0	0	0	9	39th
2026	NASCAR Craftsman Truck Series	Tricon Garage	1	0	0	0	0	0	NC†

^{*} Season still in progress.
^{†} Ineligible for championship points.

== NASCAR ==
(key) (Bold – Pole position awarded by qualifying time. Italics – Pole position earned by points standings or practice time. * – Most laps led.)

=== Cup Series ===
NASCAR Cup Series results
Year	Team	No.	Make	1	2	3	4	5	6	7	8	9	10	11	12	13	14	15	16	17	18	19	20	21	22	23	24	25	26	27	28	29	30	31	32	33	34	35	36	NCSC	Pts	Ref
2001	Hendrick Motorsports	48	Chevy	DAY	CAR	LVS	ATL	DAR	BRI	TEX	MAR	TAL	CAL	RCH	CLT	DOV	MCH	POC	SON	DAY	CHI	NHA	POC	IND	GLN	MCH	BRI	DAR	RCH	DOV	KAN	CLT; 39	MAR	TAL	PHO	CAR	HOM; 25	ATL; 29	NHA	52nd	210	
2002	Hendrick Motorsports	48	Chevy	**DAY**; 15	CAR; 28	LVS; 6	ATL; 3	DAR; 6	BRI; 7	TEX; 6	MAR; 35	**TAL**; 7	CAL; 1	RCH; 31	**CLT**; 7*	DOV; 1*	POC; 3	MCH; 14	SON; 35	DAY; 8	CHI; 4	NHA; 15	POC; 15	IND; 9	GLN; 16	MCH; 7	BRI; 34	DAR; 9	**RCH**; 13	NHA; 9	DOV; 1*	KAN; 10	**TAL**; 37	CLT; 6	MAR; 6	ATL; 22	CAR; 37	PHO; 15	HOM; 8	5th	4600	
2003	Hendrick Motorsports	48	Chevy	DAY; 3	CAR; 8	LVS; 11	ATL; 32	DAR; 27	BRI; 8	TEX; 8	TAL; 15*	MAR; 9	CAL; 16	RCH; 19	CLT; 1	DOV; 38	**POC**; 12	MCH; 16	SON; 17	DAY; 18	CHI; 3	NHA; 1	POC; 15	IND; 18	GLN; 4	MCH; 27	BRI; 5	DAR; 3	RCH; 11	NHA; 1	DOV; 8	TAL; 34	**KAN**; 7	CLT; 3	MAR; 2	ATL; 3	PHO; 2	CAR; 2	HOM; 3	2nd	4932	
2004	Hendrick Motorsports	48	Chevy	DAY; 5	CAR; 41	LVS; 16	ATL; 4	DAR; 1	BRI; 16	TEX; 9	MAR; 4	TAL; 4	CAL; 2	RCH; 2	**CLT**; 1*	DOV; 32	POC; 1*	MCH; 4	SON; 5	DAY; 2	CHI; 2	NHA; 11	POC; 1	IND; 36	GLN; 40	MCH; 40	BRI; 3	CAL; 14	RCH; 36	NHA; 11	DOV; 10	TAL; 37	KAN; 32	CLT; 1	MAR; 1	ATL; 1	PHO; 6	DAR; 1*	HOM; 2	2nd	6498	
2005	Hendrick Motorsports	48	Chevy	DAY; 5	CAL; 2	LVS; 1*	ATL; 2*	BRI; 6	MAR; 8	TEX; 3	PHO; 15	TAL; 20	DAR; 7	RCH; 40	CLT; 1	DOV; 4	POC; 6	MCH; 19	SON; 36	DAY; 6	**CHI**; 3	NHA; 13	POC; 12	IND; 38	GLN; 5	MCH; 10	BRI; 36	CAL; 16	RCH; 25	NHA; 8	DOV; 1	TAL; 31	KAN; 6	CLT; 1	MAR; 3*	ATL; 16	TEX; 5	PHO; 7	HOM; 40	5th	6406	
2006	Hendrick Motorsports	48	Chevy	DAY; 1	CAL; 2	LVS; 1	ATL; 6	BRI; 30	**MAR**; 3	TEX; 11	PHO; 7	TAL; 1	RCH; 12	DAR; 4	CLT; 2	DOV; 6	POC; 10	MCH; 6	SON; 10	DAY; 32	CHI; 6	NHA; 9	POC; 6	IND; 1	GLN; 17	MCH; 13	BRI; 10	CAL; 11	RCH; 23	NHA; 39	DOV; 13	KAN; 14*	TAL; 24	CLT; 2	MAR; 1*	ATL; 2	TEX; 2	PHO; 2	HOM; 9	1st	6475	
2007	Hendrick Motorsports	48	Chevy	DAY; 39	CAL; 3	LVS; 1	ATL; 1*	BRI; 16	MAR; 1	TEX; 38	PHO; 4	TAL; 2	RCH; 1	DAR; 3	CLT; 10	DOV; 15	POC; 42	MCH; 19	SON; 17	NHA; 5	DAY; 10	CHI; 37	IND; 39	POC; 5	GLN; 3	MCH; 3	BRI; 21	CAL; 1	**RCH**; 1	NHA; 6	**DOV**; 14	**KAN**; 3	TAL; 2	CLT; 14*	MAR; 1	ATL; 1	TEX; 1	PHO; 1	**HOM**; 7	1st	6723	
2008	Hendrick Motorsports	48	Chevy	**DAY**; 27	CAL; 2*	LVS; 29	ATL; 13	BRI; 18	MAR; 4	TEX; 2	PHO; 1*	TAL; 13	RCH; 30	DAR; 13	CLT; 39	DOV; 7	POC; 6	MCH; 6	SON; 15	NHA; 9	DAY; 23	CHI; 2	**IND**; 1*	**POC**; 3	GLN; 7	MCH; 17	BRI; 33	**CAL**; 1*	RCH; 1	NHA; 2*	DOV; 5	**KAN**; 1*	TAL; 9	CLT; 6*	MAR; 1*	ATL; 2	TEX; 15	**PHO**; 1*	HOM; 15	1st	6684	
2009	Hendrick Motorsports	48	Chevy	DAY; 31	CAL; 9	LVS; 24*	ATL; 9	BRI; 3	MAR; 1	TEX; 2	PHO; 4	TAL; 30	RCH; 36	DAR; 2	CLT; 13	DOV; 1*	POC; 7	MCH; 22*	SON; 4	NHA; 9	DAY; 2	CHI; 8	IND; 1	POC; 13	**GLN**; 12	MCH; 33*	BRI; 8	ATL; 36	RCH; 11	NHA; 4	**DOV**; 1*	KAN; 9	CAL; 1*	**CLT**; 1*	MAR; 2	TAL; 6	TEX; 38	PHO; 1*	**HOM**; 5	1st	6652	
2010	Hendrick Motorsports	48	Chevy	DAY; 35	CAL; 1*	LVS; 1	ATL; 12	BRI; 1	MAR; 9	PHO; 3*	TEX; 2	TAL; 31	RCH; 10	DAR; 36	DOV; 16*	CLT; 37	POC; 5	MCH; 6	SON; 1*	NHA; 1	DAY; 31	CHI; 25*	IND; 22	POC; 10	GLN; 28	MCH; 12	**BRI**; 35	ATL; 3	RCH; 3	NHA; 25	**DOV**; 1*	KAN; 2	CAL; 3	CLT; 3	MAR; 5	TAL; 7	TEX; 9	PHO; 5	HOM; 2	1st	6622	
2011	Hendrick Motorsports	48	Chevy	DAY; 27	PHO; 3	LVS; 16	BRI; 3*	CAL; 2	MAR; 11	TEX; 8	TAL; 1	RCH; 8	DAR; 15	DOV; 9*	CLT; 28	KAN; 7	POC; 4	MCH; 27	SON; 7	DAY; 20	KEN; 3	NHA; 5	IND; 19	POC; 4	GLN; 10	MCH; 2	BRI; 4	ATL; 2	RCH; 31	CHI; 10	NHA; 18	DOV; 2*	KAN; 1*	CLT; 34	TAL; 26	MAR; 2	TEX; 14	PHO; 14	HOM; 32	6th	2304	
2012	Hendrick Motorsports	48	Chevy	DAY; 42	PHO; 4	LVS; 2	BRI; 9	CAL; 10	MAR; 12	TEX; 2*	KAN; 3	RCH; 6	TAL; 35	DAR; 1*	CLT; 11	DOV; 1*	POC; 4	MCH; 5	SON; 5	**KEN**; 6	DAY; 36	NHA; 7	IND; 1*	POC; 14*	GLN; 3	MCH; 27	BRI; 2	ATL; 34	RCH; 13	**CHI**; 2*	NHA; 2	DOV; 4	TAL; 17	CLT; 3	KAN; 9	**MAR**; 1*	**TEX**; 1*	PHO; 32	HOM; 36	3rd	2360	
2013	Hendrick Motorsports	48	Chevy	DAY; 1	PHO; 2	LVS; 6	BRI; 22	CAL; 12	**MAR**; 1*	TEX; 6	KAN; 3	RCH; 12	TAL; 5	DAR; 4	CLT; 22	DOV; 17	POC; 1*	MCH; 28	SON; 9	KEN; 9*	DAY; 1*	NHA; 6	IND; 2*	**POC**; 13	GLN; 8	MCH; 40	BRI; 36	ATL; 28	RCH; 40	CHI; 5	NHA; 4	DOV; 1*	KAN; 6	CLT; 4	TAL; 13*	MAR; 5	TEX; 1*	**PHO**; 3	HOM; 9	1st	2419	
2014	Hendrick Motorsports	48	Chevy	DAY; 5	PHO; 6	LVS; 6	BRI; 19	CAL; 24*	MAR; 2*	TEX; 25	DAR; 3	RCH; 32	TAL; 23	KAN; 9	**CLT**; 1*	DOV; 1*	POC; 6	MCH; 1	SON; 7	KEN; 10	DAY; 42	NHA; 42	IND; 14	POC; 39	GLN; 28	MCH; 9	BRI; 4	ATL; 4	RCH; 8	CHI; 12	NHA; 5	DOV; 3	KAN; 40	CLT; 17	TAL; 24*	MAR; 32	TEX; 1*	PHO; 39	HOM; 9	11th	2274	
2015	Hendrick Motorsports	48	Chevy	DAY; 5	ATL; 1	LVS; 41	PHO; 11	CAL; 9	MAR; 35	TEX; 1*	BRI; 2	RCH; 3	TAL; 2	KAN; 1	CLT; 40	DOV; 1	POC; 3	MCH; 19	SON; 6*	DAY; 2	KEN; 9	NHA; 22	IND; 15	POC; 6	GLN; 10	MCH; 39	BRI; 4	DAR; 19	RCH; 9	CHI; 11	NHA; 6	DOV; 41	CLT; 39	KAN; 3	TAL; 18	MAR; 12	TEX; 1	**PHO**; 5	HOM; 9	10th	2315	
2016	Hendrick Motorsports	48	Chevy	DAY; 16	ATL; 1	LVS; 3*	PHO; 11	CAL; 1	MAR; 9	TEX; 4	BRI; 23	RCH; 3	TAL; 22	KAN; 17	DOV; 25	CLT; 3	POC; 35	MCH; 16	SON; 13	DAY; 35	KEN; 32	**NHA**; 12	IND; 3	POC; 16	GLN; 40	BRI; 7	MCH; 6	DAR; 33	RCH; 11	CHI; 12*	NHA; 8	DOV; 7	CLT; 1*	KAN; 4	TAL; 23	MAR; 1	TEX; 11	PHO; 38	HOM; 1	1st	5040	
2017	Hendrick Motorsports	48	Chevy	DAY; 34	ATL; 19	LVS; 11	PHO; 9	CAL; 21	MAR; 15	TEX; 1	BRI; 1	RCH; 11	TAL; 8	KAN; 24	CLT; 17	DOV; 1	POC; 36	MCH; 10	SON; 13	DAY; 12	KEN; 40	NHA; 10	IND; 27	POC; 35	GLN; 29	MCH; 19	BRI; 11	DAR; 12	RCH; 8	CHI; 8	NHA; 14	DOV; 3	CLT; 7	TAL; 24	KAN; 11	MAR; 12	TEX; 27	PHO; 39	HOM; 27	10th	2260	
2018	Hendrick Motorsports	48	Chevy	DAY; 38	ATL; 27	LVS; 12	PHO; 14	CAL; 9	MAR; 15	TEX; 35	BRI; 3	RCH; 6	TAL; 12	DOV; 9	KAN; 19	CLT; 5	POC; 8	MCH; 20	SON; 11	CHI; 14	DAY; 23	KEN; 14	NHA; 10	POC; 17	GLN; 30	MCH; 28	BRI; 9	DAR; 39	IND; 16	LVS; 22	RCH; 8	ROV; 8	DOV; 36	TAL; 7	KAN; 22	MAR; 12	TEX; 15	PHO; 15	HOM; 14	14th	2242	
2019	Hendrick Motorsports	48	Chevy	DAY; 9	ATL; 24	LVS; 19	PHO; 8	CAL; 17	MAR; 24	**TEX**; 5	BRI; 10	RCH; 12	TAL; 33	DOV; 14	KAN; 6	CLT; 8	POC; 19	MCH; 15	SON; 12	CHI; 4	DAY; 3	KEN; 30	NHA; 30	POC; 15	GLN; 19	MCH; 34	BRI; 19	DAR; 16	IND; 35	LVS; 11	RCH; 10	ROV; 9	DOV; 8	TAL; 38	KAN; 10	MAR; 38	TEX; 34	PHO; 14	HOM; 13	18th	835	
2020	Hendrick Motorsports	48	Chevy	DAY; 35	LVS; 5	CAL; 7	PHO; 12	DAR; 38	DAR; 8	CLT; 40	CLT; 11	BRI; 3	ATL; 7	MAR; 10	HOM; 16	TAL; 13	POC; 21	POC; 16	IND	KEN; 18	TEX; 26	KAN; 32	NHA; 12	MCH; 12	MCH; 11	DRC; 4	DOV; 7	DOV; 3	DAY; 17	DAR; 18	RCH; 31	BRI; 17	LVS; 11	TAL; 29	ROV; 13	KAN; 31	TEX; 36	MAR; 30	PHO; 5	18th	836	
2023	Legacy Motor Club	84	Chevy	DAY; 31	CAL	LVS	PHO	ATL	COA; 38	RCH	BRD	MAR	TAL	DOV	KAN	DAR	CLT; 37	GTW	SON	NSH	CSC	ATL	NHA	POC	RCH	MCH	IRC	GLN	DAY	DAR	KAN	BRI	TEX	TAL	ROV	LVS	HOM	MAR	PHO	39th	12	
2024	Legacy Motor Club	84	Toyota	DAY; 28	ATL	LVS	PHO	BRI	COA	RCH	MAR	TEX; 29	TAL	DOV; 28	KAN; 38	DAR	CLT; 29	GTW	SON	IOW	NHA	NSH	CSC	POC	IND; 33	RCH	MCH	DAY	DAR	ATL	GLN	BRI	KAN; 36	TAL	ROV	LVS; 28	HOM	MAR	PHO; 26	37th	60	
2025	Legacy Motor Club	84	Toyota	DAY; 3	ATL	COA	PHO	LVS	HOM	MAR	DAR	BRI	TAL	TEX	KAN	CLT; 40	NSH	MCH	MXC	POC	ATL	CSC	SON	DOV	IND	IOW	GLN	RCH	DAY	DAR	GTW	BRI	NHA	KAN	ROV	LVS	TAL	MAR	PHO	38th	35	
2026	Legacy Motor Club	84	Toyota	DAY; 29	ATL	COA	PHO	LVS	DAR	MAR	BRI	KAN	TAL	TEX	GLN	CLT	NSH	MCH	POC	COR; 28	SON	CHI	ATL	NWS	IND	IOW	RCH	NHA	DAY	DAR	GTW	BRI	KAN	LVS	CLT	PHO	TAL	MAR	HOM	39th	9	

==== Daytona 500 ====
Year	Team	Manufacturer	Start	Finish
2002	Hendrick Motorsports	Chevrolet	**1**	15
2003	Hendrick Motorsports	Chevrolet	10	3
2004	Hendrick Motorsports	Chevrolet	6	5
2005	Hendrick Motorsports	Chevrolet	2	5
2006	Hendrick Motorsports	Chevrolet	9	**1**
2007	Hendrick Motorsports	Chevrolet	21	39
2008	Hendrick Motorsports	Chevrolet	**1**	27
2009	Hendrick Motorsports	Chevrolet	7	31
2010	Hendrick Motorsports	Chevrolet	3	35
2011	Hendrick Motorsports	Chevrolet	23	27
2012	Hendrick Motorsports	Chevrolet	8	42
2013	Hendrick Motorsports	Chevrolet	9	**1**
2014	Hendrick Motorsports	Chevrolet	32	5
2015	Hendrick Motorsports	Chevrolet	2	5
2016	Hendrick Motorsports	Chevrolet	26	16
2017	Hendrick Motorsports	Chevrolet	24	34
2018	Hendrick Motorsports	Chevrolet	35	38
2019	Hendrick Motorsports	Chevrolet	17	9
2020	Hendrick Motorsports	Chevrolet	6	35
2023	Legacy Motor Club	Chevrolet	39	31
2024	Legacy Motor Club	Toyota	23	28
2025	Legacy Motor Club	Toyota	40	3
2026	Legacy Motor Club	Toyota	31	29

=== Nationwide Series ===
NASCAR Nationwide Series results
Year	Team	No.	Make	1	2	3	4	5	6	7	8	9	10	11	12	13	14	15	16	17	18	19	20	21	22	23	24	25	26	27	28	29	30	31	32	33	34	35	NNSC	Pts	Ref
1998	ST Motorsports	59	Chevy	DAY	CAR	LVS	NSV	DAR	BRI	TEX	HCY	TAL	NHA	NZH	CLT	DOV	RCH	PPR	GLN	MLW	MYB	CAL	SBO	IRP; 25	MCH	BRI	DAR	RCH	DOV	CLT	GTW; 15	CAR	ATL						67th	275	
1998	Curb Agajanian Performance Group	43	Chevy																															HOM; 33					67th	275	
1999	Herzog Motorsports	92	Chevy	DAY	CAR	LVS	ATL	DAR	TEX	NSV	BRI	TAL	CAL	NHA	RCH	NZH	CLT	DOV	SBO	GLN	MLW; 7	MYB	PPR	GTW	IRP	MCH	BRI	DAR	RCH	DOV	CLT	CAR; 25	MEM; 12	PHO; 18	HOM; 39				63rd	521	
2000	Herzog Motorsports	92	Chevy	DAY; DNQ	CAR; 22	LVS; 26	ATL; 27	DAR; 36	BRI; 24	TEX; 24	NSV; 10	TAL; 29	CAL; 15	RCH; 12	NHA; 13	CLT; 16	DOV; 20	SBO; 6	MYB; 15	GLN; 43	MLW; 9	NZH; 14	PPR; 18	GTW; 13	IRP; 11	MCH; 6	BRI; 23	DAR; 38	RCH; 22	DOV; 18	CLT; 28	CAR; 13	MEM; 8	PHO; 40	HOM; 6				10th	3264	
2001	Herzog Motorsports	92	Chevy	DAY; 5	CAR; 13	LVS; 14	ATL; 9	DAR; 32	BRI; 4	TEX; 8	NSH; 28	TAL; 28	CAL; 16	RCH; 12	NHA; 13	NZH; 9	CLT; 16	DOV; 25	KEN; 30	MLW; 26	GLN; 21	CHI; 1	GTW; 14	PPR; 7	IRP; 15	MCH; 4	BRI; 12	DAR; 16	RCH; 19	DOV; 33	KAN; 6	CLT; 22	MEM; 14	PHO; 21	CAR; 23	HOM; 7			8th	3871	
2004	Hendrick Motorsports	48	Chevy	DAY	CAR	LVS	DAR	BRI	TEX	NSH	TAL	CAL	GTW	RCH	NZH	CLT	DOV	NSH	KEN	MLW	DAY	CHI	NHA	PPR	IRP	MCH	BRI	CAL	RCH	DOV	KAN	CLT; 3	MEM	ATL	PHO	DAR	HOM		98th	170	
2005	Hendrick Motorsports	48	Chevy	DAY	CAL	MXC	LVS	ATL; 3*	NSH	BRI	TEX	PHO	TAL			CLT; 30						CHI; 17	NHA	PPR	GTW	IRP	GLN	MCH	BRI	CAL; 11	RCH	DOV	KAN	**CLT**; 43	MEM	TEX	PHO	HOM	53rd	876	
2005	Hendrick Motorsports	5	Chevy											**DAR**; 23	RCH; 25		DOV; 5	NSH	KEN	MLW	DAY																		53rd	876	
2006	Hendrick Motorsports	48	Chevy	DAY	CAL	MXC	LVS	ATL	BRI	TEX	NSH	PHO	TAL	RCH	DAR	CLT; 7	DOV	NSH	KEN	MLW	DAY	CHI	NHA	MAR	GTW	IRP	GLN	MCH	BRI	CAL; 21	RCH	DOV	KAN	CLT; 42	MEM	TEX	PHO	HOM	84th	283	
2007	Hendrick Motorsports	48	Chevy	DAY	CAL	MXC	LVS	ATL	BRI	NSH	TEX	PHO	TAL	RCH	DAR	CLT; 6	DOV	NSH	KEN	MLW	NHA	DAY	CHI	GTW	IRP	CGV	GLN	MCH	BRI	CAL; 4	RCH	DOV	KAN	CLT; 32	MEM	TEX	PHO	HOM	82nd	387	
2008	JR Motorsports	5	Chevy	DAY	CAL	LVS	ATL	BRI	NSH	TEX	PHO	MXC	TAL	RCH	DAR	CLT; 10	DOV	NSH	KEN	MLW	NHA	DAY	CHI	GTW	IRP	CGV				CAL; 17	RCH	DOV	KAN	CLT; 33	MEM	TEX	PHO	HOM	69th	396	
2008	JR Motorsports	48	Chevy																								GLN; 29	MCH	BRI										69th	396	
2011	JR Motorsports	7	Chevy	DAY	PHO	LVS	BRI	CAL	TEX	TAL	NSH	RCH	DAR	DOV	IOW	CLT	CHI	MCH	ROA	DAY	KEN	NHA	NSH	IRP	IOW	GLN; 2	CGV	BRI	ATL	RCH	CHI	DOV	KAN	CLT	TEX	PHO	HOM		104th	0^{1}	
2013	JR Motorsports	5	Chevy	DAY	PHO; 12	LVS	BRI	CAL	TEX	RCH	TAL	DAR	CLT	DOV	IOW	MCH	ROA	KEN	DAY	NHA	CHI	IND	IOW	GLN	MOH	BRI	ATL	RCH	CHI	KEN	DOV	KAN	CLT	TEX	PHO	HOM			111th	0^{1}	

=== Craftsman Truck Series ===
NASCAR Craftsman Truck Series results
Year	Team	No.	Make	1	2	3	4	5	6	7	8	9	10	11	12	13	14	15	16	17	18	19	20	21	22	23	24	25	NCTSC	Pts	Ref
2008	Randy Moss Motorsports	81	Chevy	DAY	CAL	ATL	MAR	KAN	CLT	MFD	DOV	TEX	MCH	MLW	MEM	KEN	IRP	NSH	BRI; 34	GTW	NHA	LVS	TAL	MAR	ATL	TEX	PHO	HOM	104th	64	
2026	Tricon Garage	1	Toyota	DAY	ATL	STP	DAR	CAR	BRI	TEX	GLN	DOV	CLT	NSH	MCH	COR; 30	LRP	NWS	IRP	RCH	NHA	BRI	KAN	CLT	PHO	TAL	MAR	HOM	119th	0^{1}	

^{*} Season still in progress
^{1} Ineligible for series points

== Rolex Sports Car Series ==
=== Daytona Prototype ===
(key) Bold – Pole Position. (Overall Finish/Class Finish).

Daytona Prototype results
Year	Team	1	2	3	4	5	6	7	8	9	10	11	12	13	14	15	Rank	Points
2004	Howard-Boss Motorsports	DAY (28/7)	HOM	PHO	MON	WGL	DAY	MOH	WGL	HOM	VIR	BAR	CAL				65th	23
2005	Howard-Boss Motorsports	DAY (2/2)	HOM	CAL	LGA	MON	WGL	DAY	BAR	WGL	MOH	PHO	WGL	VIR	MEX		70th	32
2007	Riley-Matthews Motorsports	DAY (36/19)	MEX	HOM	VIR	LGA	WGL	MOH	DAY (9/9)	IOW	BAR	CGV	WGL	INF	MIL		57th	34
2008	Bob Stallings Racing	DAY (2/2)	HOM	MEX	VIR	LGA	LRP	WGL	MOH	DAY	BAR	CGL	WGL	INF	JER	MIL	56th	32
2009	Bob Stallings Racing	DAY (7/7)	VIR	JER	LGA	WGL	MOH	DAY	BAR	WGL	CGV	MIL	HOM				54th	24
2010	Bob Stallings Racing	DAY (21/8)	HOM	BAR	VIR	LRP	WGL (6/6)	MOH	DAY	JER	GLN	CGV	MIL				30th	48
2011	Bob Stallings Racing	DAY (15/12)	HOM	BAR	VIR	LPR	WGL	ROA	LGA	JER	WGL	CGV	MOH				59th	19

== IMSA SportsCar Championship results ==
(key)(Races in bold indicate pole position)

Year	Team	No.	Class	Make	Engine	1	2	3	4	5	6	7	8	9	10	Rank	Points
2021	Ally Cadillac Racing	48	DPi	Cadillac DPi-V.R	Cadillac 5.5 L V8	DAY; 2	SEB; 7	MOH	DET	WGL; 5	WGL	ELK	LGA	LBH	PET; 4	12th	1203
2022	Ally Cadillac	48	DPi	Cadillac DPi-V.R	Cadillac 5.5 L V8	DAY; 5	SEB	LBH	LGA	MOH	DET	WGL; 6	MOS	ELK	PET; 3	12th	889

^{*} Season still in progress.

=== 24 Hours of Daytona results ===
Year	Class	No.	Team	Car	Co-drivers	Laps	Position	Class Pos.
2004	DP	4	(United States) Howard-Boss Motorsports	Crawford DP03	(United States) Butch Leitzinger (United States) Elliott Forbes-Robinson (United States) David Brule	456	28 ^{DNF}	7 ^{DNF}
2005	DP	4	(United States) Howard-Boss Motorsports	Crawford DP03	(United States) Butch Leitzinger (United States) Elliott Forbes-Robinson	699	2	2
2007	DP	91	(United States) Lowe's Riley-Matthews Motorsports	Riley Mk XI	(United States) Jim Matthews (Belgium) Marc Goossens (United States) Ryan Hunter-Reay	560	36 ^{DNF}	19 ^{DNF}
2008	DP	99	(United States) GAINSCO/Bob Stallings Racing	Riley Mk XI	(United States) Jon Fogarty (United States) Alex Gurney (United States) Jimmy Vasser	693	2	2
2009	DP	99	(United States) GAINSCO/Bob Stallings Racing	Riley Mk XX	(United States) Jon Fogarty (United States) Alex Gurney (United States) Jimmy Vasser	714	7	7
2010	DP	99	(United States) GAINSCO/Bob Stallings Racing	Riley Mk XI	(United States) Jon Fogarty (United States) Alex Gurney (United States) Jimmy Vasser	630	21 ^{DNF}	8 ^{DNF}
2011	DP	99	(United States) GAINSCO/Bob Stallings Racing	Riley Mk XX	(United States) Jon Fogarty (United States) Alex Gurney	679	15	12
2021	DPi	48	(United States) Ally Cadillac Racing	Cadillac DPi-V.R	(Japan) Kamui Kobayashi (France) Simon Pagenaud (Germany) Mike Rockenfeller	807	2	2
2022	DPi	48	(United States) Ally Cadillac Racing	Cadillac DPi-V.R	(Japan) Kamui Kobayashi (Argentina) José María López (Germany) Mike Rockenfeller	739	12	5

== Le Mans 24 Hours results ==
Year	Team	Co-Drivers	Car	Class	Laps	Pos.	Class Pos.	Ref
2023	(United States) Hendrick Motorsports	(United Kingdom) Jenson Button (Germany) Mike Rockenfeller	Chevrolet Camaro ZL1	Innovative	285	39th	—	

== American open-wheel racing results ==
(key)

=== IndyCar Series ===
(key)

Year	Team	No.	Chassis	Engine	1	2	3	4	5	6	7	8	9	10	11	12	13	14	15	16	17	Rank	Points	Ref
2021	Chip Ganassi Racing	48	Dallara DW12	Honda	ALA; 19	STP; 22	TXS	TXS	IMS; 24	INDY	DET; 24	DET; 21	ROA; 21	MOH; 22	NSH; 26	IMS; 19	GTW	POR; 20	LAG; 17	LBH; 17		26th	108	
2022	Chip Ganassi Racing	48	Dallara DW12	Honda	STP; 23	TXS; 6	LBH; 20	ALA; 24	IMS; 22	INDY; 28	DET; 22	ROA; 24	MOH; 16	TOR; 21	IOW; 11	IOW; 5	IMS; 22	NSH; 18	GTW; 14	POR; 24	LAG; 16	21st	214	

* Season still in progress.

==== Indianapolis 500 ====
Year	Chassis	Engine	Start	Finish	Team
2022	Dallara	Honda	12	28	Chip Ganassi Racing

== International Race of Champions ==
(key) (Bold – Pole position. * – Most laps led.)

International Race of Champions results
Year	Make	1	2	3	4	Pos.	Points	Ref
2003	Pontiac	DAY; 4	TAL; 8	CHI; 7	IND; 1	3rd	56	
2004	Pontiac	DAY; 4	TEX; 3	RIC; 4	ATL; 6	4th	46	
