= 2002 UAW-DaimlerChrysler 400 =

Third race of the 2002 NASCAR Winston Cup Series

Race details
- Race 3 of 36 in the 2002 NASCAR Winston Cup Series
- The 2002 UAW-DaimlerChrysler 400 program cover.
- Date: March 3, 2002
- Official name: 5th Annual UAW-DaimlerChrysler 400
- Location: North Las Vegas, Nevada, Las Vegas Motor Speedway
- Course: Permanent racing facility
- Course length: 1.5 miles (2.41 km)
- Distance: 267 laps, 400.5 mi (644.542 km)
- Scheduled distance: 267 laps, 400.5 mi (644.542 km)
- Average speed: 136.754 miles per hour (220.084 km/h)

Pole position
Driver	Todd Bodine	Haas-Carter Motorsports
- Time: 31.240

Most laps led
Driver	Tony Stewart	Joe Gibbs Racing
- Laps: 76

Winner
No. 40	Sterling Marlin	Chip Ganassi Racing

Television in the United States
- Network: FOX
- Announcers: Mike Joy, Larry McReynolds, Darrell Waltrip

Radio in the United States
- Radio: Performance Racing Network
- Booth announcers: Doug Rice, Mark Garrow
- Turn announcers: Chuck Carland, Rob Albright

The 2002 UAW-DaimlerChrysler 400 was the third stock car race of the 2002 NASCAR Winston Cup Series and the fifth iteration of the event. The race was held on Sunday, March 3, 2002, in North Las Vegas, Nevada at Las Vegas Motor Speedway, a 1.5 miles (2.4 km) permanent D-shaped oval racetrack. The race took the scheduled 267 laps to complete. At race's end, Sterling Marlin, driving for Chip Ganassi Racing, would escape a penalty and hold off the field within the closing laps of the race to win his ninth career NASCAR Winston Cup Series win and his first of the season. To fill out the podium, Jeremy Mayfield of Evernham Motorsports and Mark Martin of Roush Racing would finish second and third, respectively.

== Background ==
The layout of Las Vegas Motor Speedway, the venue where the race was held.

Las Vegas Motor Speedway, located in Clark County, Nevada outside the Las Vegas city limits and about 15 miles northeast of the Las Vegas Strip, is a 1,200-acre (490 ha) complex of multiple tracks for motorsports racing. The complex is owned by Speedway Motorsports, which is headquartered in Charlotte, North Carolina.

=== Entry list ===
- (R) denotes rookie driver.

#	Driver	Team	Make
1	Kenny Wallace	Dale Earnhardt, Inc.	Chevrolet
2	Rusty Wallace	Penske Racing	Ford
4	Mike Skinner	Morgan–McClure Motorsports	Chevrolet
5	Terry Labonte	Hendrick Motorsports	Chevrolet
6	Mark Martin	Roush Racing	Ford
7	Casey Atwood	Ultra-Evernham Motorsports	Dodge
8	Dale Earnhardt Jr.	Dale Earnhardt, Inc.	Chevrolet
9	Bill Elliott	Evernham Motorsports	Dodge
10	Johnny Benson Jr.	MBV Motorsports	Pontiac
11	Brett Bodine	Brett Bodine Racing	Ford
12	Ryan Newman (R)	Penske Racing	Ford
14	Stacy Compton	A. J. Foyt Enterprises	Pontiac
15	Michael Waltrip	Dale Earnhardt, Inc.	Chevrolet
17	Matt Kenseth	Roush Racing	Ford
18	Bobby Labonte	Joe Gibbs Racing	Pontiac
19	Jeremy Mayfield	Evernham Motorsports	Dodge
20	Tony Stewart	Joe Gibbs Racing	Pontiac
21	Elliott Sadler	Wood Brothers Racing	Ford
22	Ward Burton	Bill Davis Racing	Dodge
23	Hut Stricklin	Bill Davis Racing	Dodge
24	Jeff Gordon	Hendrick Motorsports	Chevrolet
25	Jerry Nadeau	Hendrick Motorsports	Chevrolet
26	Joe Nemechek	Haas-Carter Motorsports	Ford
28	Ricky Rudd	Robert Yates Racing	Ford
29	Kevin Harvick	Richard Childress Racing	Chevrolet
30	Jeff Green	Richard Childress Racing	Chevrolet
31	Robby Gordon	Richard Childress Racing	Chevrolet
32	Ricky Craven	PPI Motorsports	Ford
36	Ken Schrader	MB2 Motorsports	Pontiac
40	Sterling Marlin	Chip Ganassi Racing	Dodge
41	Jimmy Spencer	Chip Ganassi Racing	Dodge
43	John Andretti	Petty Enterprises	Dodge
44	Buckshot Jones	Petty Enterprises	Dodge
45	Kyle Petty	Petty Enterprises	Dodge
48	Jimmie Johnson (R)	Hendrick Motorsports	Chevrolet
49	Shawna Robinson (R)	BAM Racing	Dodge
55	Bobby Hamilton	Andy Petree Racing	Chevrolet
57	Derrike Cope	Team CLR	Ford
66	Todd Bodine	Haas-Carter Motorsports	Ford
77	Dave Blaney	Jasper Motorsports	Ford
88	Dale Jarrett	Robert Yates Racing	Ford
90	Rick Mast	Donlavey Racing	Ford
97	Kurt Busch	Roush Racing	Ford
99	Jeff Burton	Roush Racing	Ford
Official entry list

== Practice ==
=== First practice ===
The first practice session was held on Friday, March 1, at 10:20 AM PST, and would last for two hours. Kurt Busch of Roush Racing would set the fastest time in the session, with a lap of 31.472 and an average speed of 171.580 miles per hour (276.131 km/h).

Pos.	#	Driver	Team	Make	Time	Speed
1	97	Kurt Busch	Roush Racing	Ford	31.472	171.580
2	12	Ryan Newman	Penske Racing	Ford	31.497	171.438
3	20	Tony Stewart	Joe Gibbs Racing	Pontiac	31.663	170.541
Full first practice results

=== Second practice ===
The second practice session was held on Saturday, March 2, at 9:30 AM PST, and would last for 45 minutes. Ryan Newman of Penske Racing would set the fastest time in the session, with a lap of 32.083 and an average speed of 168.307 miles per hour (270.864 km/h).

Pos.	#	Driver	Team	Make	Time	Speed
1	12	Ryan Newman	Penske Racing	Ford	32.083	168.307
2	40	Sterling Marlin	Chip Ganassi Racing	Dodge	32.355	166.893
3	66	Todd Bodine	Haas-Carter Motorsports	Ford	32.396	166.682
Full second practice results

=== Third and final practice ===
The third and final practice session, sometimes referred to as Happy Hour, was held on Saturday, March 2, at 11:15 AM PST, and would last for 45 minutes. Jimmie Johnson of Hendrick Motorsports would set the fastest time in the session, with a lap of 32.271 and an average speed of 167.328 miles per hour (269.288 km/h).

Pos.	#	Driver	Team	Make	Time	Speed
1	48	Jimmie Johnson	Hendrick Motorsports	Chevrolet	32.271	167.328
2	32	Ricky Craven	PPI Motorsports	Ford	32.304	167.162
3	6	Mark Martin	Roush Racing	Ford	32.389	166.718
Full Happy Hour practice results

== Qualifying ==
Qualifying was held on Friday, March 1, at 2:00 PM PST. Each driver would have two laps to set a fastest time; the fastest of the two would count as their official qualifying lap. Positions 1-36 would be decided on time, while positions 37-43 would be based on provisionals. Six spots are awarded by the use of provisionals based on owner's points. The seventh is awarded to a past champion who has not otherwise qualified for the race. If no past champ needs the provisional, the next team in the owner points will be awarded a provisional.

Todd Bodine of Haas-Carter Motorsports would win the pole, setting a time of 31.240 and an average speed of 172.849 miles per hour (278.174 km/h).

Derrike Cope was the only driver to fail to qualify.

=== Full qualifying results ===
Pos.	#	Driver	Team	Make	Time	Speed
1	66	Todd Bodine	Haas-Carter Motorsports	Ford	31.240	172.849
2	12	Ryan Newman	Penske Racing	Ford	31.243	172.838
3	97	Kurt Busch	Roush Racing	Ford	31.340	172.298
4	41	Jimmy Spencer	Chip Ganassi Racing	Dodge	31.524	171.298
5	15	Michael Waltrip	Dale Earnhardt, Inc.	Chevrolet	31.545	171.184
6	6	Mark Martin	Roush Racing	Ford	31.563	171.080
7	10	Johnny Benson Jr.	MBV Motorsports	Pontiac	31.566	171.070
8	17	Matt Kenseth	Roush Racing	Ford	31.566	171.064
9	32	Ricky Craven	PPI Motorsports	Ford	31.597	170.896
10	77	Dave Blaney	Jasper Motorsports	Ford	31.607	170.842
11	45	Kyle Petty	Petty Enterprises	Dodge	31.631	170.718
12	31	Robby Gordon	Richard Childress Racing	Chevrolet	31.642	170.659
13	24	Jeff Gordon	Hendrick Motorsports	Chevrolet	31.656	170.578
14	11	Brett Bodine	Brett Bodine Racing	Ford	31.676	170.476
15	20	Tony Stewart	Joe Gibbs Racing	Pontiac	31.677	170.465
16	25	Jerry Nadeau	Hendrick Motorsports	Chevrolet	31.704	170.320
17	1	Kenny Wallace	Dale Earnhardt, Inc.	Chevrolet	31.746	170.100
18	19	Jeremy Mayfield	Evernham Motorsports	Dodge	31.753	170.057
19	44	Buckshot Jones	Petty Enterprises	Dodge	31.778	169.923
20	26	Joe Nemechek	Haas-Carter Motorsports	Ford	31.794	169.843
21	23	Hut Stricklin	Bill Davis Racing	Dodge	31.809	169.757
22	30	Jeff Green	Richard Childress Racing	Chevrolet	31.816	169.725
23	9	Bill Elliott	Evernham Motorsports	Dodge	31.826	169.667
24	40	Sterling Marlin	Chip Ganassi Racing	Dodge	31.829	169.656
25	48	Jimmie Johnson	Hendrick Motorsports	Chevrolet	31.872	169.422
26	43	John Andretti	Petty Enterprises	Dodge	31.885	169.358
27	28	Ricky Rudd	Robert Yates Racing	Ford	31.896	169.294
28	29	Kevin Harvick	Richard Childress Racing	Chevrolet	31.899	169.284
29	36	Ken Schrader	MB2 Motorsports	Pontiac	31.905	169.252
30	14	Stacy Compton	A. J. Foyt Enterprises	Pontiac	31.920	169.172
31	4	Mike Skinner	Morgan–McClure Motorsports	Chevrolet	31.923	169.151
32	22	Ward Burton	Bill Davis Racing	Dodge	31.950	169.014
33	18	Bobby Labonte	Joe Gibbs Racing	Pontiac	31.958	168.966
34	21	Elliott Sadler	Wood Brothers Racing	Ford	31.979	168.860
35	8	Dale Earnhardt Jr.	Dale Earnhardt, Inc.	Chevrolet	31.982	168.845
36	49	Shawna Robinson	BAM Racing	Dodge	31.996	168.765
Provisionals
37	88	Dale Jarrett	Robert Yates Racing	Ford	32.125	168.088
38	2	Rusty Wallace	Penske Racing	Ford	32.166	167.879
39	99	Jeff Burton	Roush Racing	Ford	32.159	167.915
40	55	Bobby Hamilton	Andy Petree Racing	Chevrolet	32.529	166.950
41	5	Terry Labonte	Hendrick Motorsports	Chevrolet	32.353	166.908
42	7	Casey Atwood	Ultra-Evernham Motorsports	Dodge	32.500	166.148
43	90	Rick Mast	Donlavey Racing	Ford	32.474	166.281
Failed to qualify
44	57	Derrike Cope	Team CLR	Ford	32.126	168.082
Official race results

== Race results ==
Fin	St	#	Driver	Team	Make	Laps	Led	Status	Pts	Winnings
1	24	40	Sterling Marlin	Chip Ganassi Racing	Dodge	267	37	running	180	$412,842
2	18	19	Jeremy Mayfield	Evernham Motorsports	Dodge	267	17	running	175	$222,550
3	6	6	Mark Martin	Roush Racing	Ford	267	0	running	165	$199,233
4	2	12	Ryan Newman	Penske Racing	Ford	267	50	running	165	$162,125
5	15	20	Tony Stewart	Joe Gibbs Racing	Pontiac	267	76	running	165	$153,953
6	25	48	Jimmie Johnson	Hendrick Motorsports	Chevrolet	267	6	running	155	$85,350
7	37	88	Dale Jarrett	Robert Yates Racing	Ford	267	0	running	146	$122,350
8	23	9	Bill Elliott	Evernham Motorsports	Dodge	267	0	running	142	$108,356
9	39	99	Jeff Burton	Roush Racing	Ford	267	0	running	138	$119,567
10	4	41	Jimmy Spencer	Chip Ganassi Racing	Dodge	267	45	running	139	$94,425
11	38	2	Rusty Wallace	Penske Racing	Ford	267	0	running	130	$113,925
12	33	18	Bobby Labonte	Joe Gibbs Racing	Pontiac	267	0	running	127	$114,953
13	27	28	Ricky Rudd	Robert Yates Racing	Ford	267	0	running	124	$112,092
14	8	17	Matt Kenseth	Roush Racing	Ford	267	0	running	121	$88,875
15	16	25	Jerry Nadeau	Hendrick Motorsports	Chevrolet	267	0	running	118	$79,925
16	35	8	Dale Earnhardt Jr.	Dale Earnhardt, Inc.	Chevrolet	267	2	running	120	$84,875
17	13	24	Jeff Gordon	Hendrick Motorsports	Chevrolet	267	0	running	112	$116,653
18	10	77	Dave Blaney	Jasper Motorsports	Ford	267	0	running	109	$85,175
19	20	26	Joe Nemechek	Haas-Carter Motorsports	Ford	267	0	running	106	$90,662
20	3	97	Kurt Busch	Roush Racing	Ford	267	6	running	108	$67,825
21	32	22	Ward Burton	Bill Davis Racing	Dodge	266	5	running	105	$106,275
22	5	15	Michael Waltrip	Dale Earnhardt, Inc.	Chevrolet	266	0	running	97	$70,175
23	19	44	Buckshot Jones	Petty Enterprises	Dodge	266	0	running	94	$66,064
24	21	23	Hut Stricklin	Bill Davis Racing	Dodge	266	1	running	96	$60,075
25	28	29	Kevin Harvick	Richard Childress Racing	Chevrolet	266	0	running	88	$101,853
26	29	36	Ken Schrader	MB2 Motorsports	Pontiac	266	0	running	85	$65,975
27	17	1	Kenny Wallace	Dale Earnhardt, Inc.	Chevrolet	266	0	running	82	$86,750
28	34	21	Elliott Sadler	Wood Brothers Racing	Ford	266	4	running	84	$63,775
29	1	66	Todd Bodine	Haas-Carter Motorsports	Ford	266	17	running	81	$55,475
30	11	45	Kyle Petty	Petty Enterprises	Dodge	266	1	running	78	$52,775
31	9	32	Ricky Craven	PPI Motorsports	Ford	265	0	running	70	$63,075
32	7	10	Johnny Benson Jr.	MBV Motorsports	Pontiac	265	0	running	67	$62,375
33	22	30	Jeff Green	Richard Childress Racing	Chevrolet	265	0	running	64	$51,675
34	31	4	Mike Skinner	Morgan–McClure Motorsports	Chevrolet	265	0	running	61	$51,475
35	14	11	Brett Bodine	Brett Bodine Racing	Ford	265	0	running	58	$51,275
36	26	43	John Andretti	Petty Enterprises	Dodge	265	0	running	55	$78,158
37	12	31	Robby Gordon	Richard Childress Racing	Chevrolet	265	0	running	52	$76,906
38	41	5	Terry Labonte	Hendrick Motorsports	Chevrolet	264	0	running	49	$79,483
39	30	14	Stacy Compton	A. J. Foyt Enterprises	Pontiac	262	0	running	46	$50,450
40	43	90	Rick Mast	Donlavey Racing	Ford	261	0	running	43	$50,225
41	42	7	Casey Atwood	Ultra-Evernham Motorsports	Dodge	258	0	running	40	$50,025
42	36	49	Shawna Robinson	BAM Racing	Dodge	212	0	crash	37	$49,830
43	40	55	Bobby Hamilton	Andy Petree Racing	Chevrolet	7	0	crash	34	$57,880
Official race results

Previous race: 2002 Subway 400	NASCAR Winston Cup Series; 2002 season	Next race: 2002 MBNA America 500
