= 2001 Pocono 500 =

15th race of the 2001 NASCAR Winston Cup Series

Race details
- Race 15 of 36 in the 2001 NASCAR Winston Cup Series
- The 2001 Pocono 500 program cover.
- Date: June 17, 2001
- Official name: 20th Annual Pocono 500
- Location: Long Pond, Pennsylvania, Pocono Raceway
- Course: Permanent racing facility
- Course length: 2.5 miles (4.0 km)
- Distance: 200 laps, 500 mi (804.672 km)
- Scheduled distance: 200 laps, 500 mi (804.672 km)
- Average speed: 134.389 miles per hour (216.278 km/h)

Pole position
Driver	Ricky Rudd	Robert Yates Racing
- Time: 52.785

Most laps led
Driver	Jeff Gordon	Hendrick Motorsports
- Laps: 86

Winner
No. 28	Ricky Rudd	Robert Yates Racing

Television in the United States
- Network: FOX
- Announcers: Mike Joy, Larry McReynolds, Darrell Waltrip

Radio in the United States
- Radio: Motor Racing Network

The 2001 Pocono 500 was the 15th stock car race of the 2001 NASCAR Winston Cup Series and the 20th iteration of the event. The race was held on Sunday, June 17, 2001, in Long Pond, Pennsylvania, at Pocono Raceway, a 2.5 miles (4.0 km) triangular permanent course. The race took the scheduled 200 laps to complete. At race's end, Ricky Rudd, driving for Robert Yates Racing, would take over the final stages of the race to win his 21st career NASCAR Winston Cup Series win and his first of the season. The win also broke a 88-race winless streak for Rudd. Jeff Gordon, driving for Hendrick Motorsports, and Dale Jarrett, driving for Robert Yates Racing, would finish second and third, respectively.

== Background ==
The layout of Pocono Raceway, the venue where the race was held.

The race was held at Pocono Raceway, which is a three-turn superspeedway located in Long Pond, Pennsylvania. Pocono is one of a very few NASCAR tracks not owned by either Speedway Motorsports or NASCAR.

=== Entry list ===
- (R) denotes rookie driver.

#	Driver	Team	Make
1	Steve Park	Dale Earnhardt, Inc.	Chevrolet
01	Jason Leffler (R)	Chip Ganassi Racing with Felix Sabates	Dodge
2	Rusty Wallace	Penske Racing South	Ford
4	Kevin Lepage	Morgan–McClure Motorsports	Chevrolet
5	Terry Labonte	Hendrick Motorsports	Chevrolet
6	Mark Martin	Roush Racing	Ford
7	Ted Musgrave	Ultra Motorsports	Ford
8	Dale Earnhardt Jr.	Dale Earnhardt, Inc.	Chevrolet
9	Bill Elliott	Evernham Motorsports	Dodge
10	Johnny Benson Jr.	MBV Motorsports	Pontiac
11	Brett Bodine	Brett Bodine Racing	Ford
12	Jeremy Mayfield	Penske Racing South	Ford
14	Ron Hornaday Jr. (R)	A. J. Foyt Enterprises	Pontiac
15	Michael Waltrip	Dale Earnhardt, Inc.	Chevrolet
17	Matt Kenseth	Roush Racing	Ford
18	Bobby Labonte	Joe Gibbs Racing	Pontiac
19	Casey Atwood (R)	Evernham Motorsports	Dodge
20	Tony Stewart	Joe Gibbs Racing	Pontiac
21	Elliott Sadler	Wood Brothers Racing	Ford
22	Ward Burton	Bill Davis Racing	Dodge
24	Jeff Gordon	Hendrick Motorsports	Chevrolet
25	Jerry Nadeau	Hendrick Motorsports	Chevrolet
26	Jimmy Spencer	Haas-Carter Motorsports	Ford
27	Kenny Wallace	Eel River Racing	Pontiac
28	Ricky Rudd	Robert Yates Racing	Ford
29	Kevin Harvick (R)	Richard Childress Racing	Chevrolet
31	Mike Skinner	Richard Childress Racing	Chevrolet
32	Ricky Craven	PPI Motorsports	Ford
33	Wally Dallenbach Jr.	Andy Petree Racing	Chevrolet
36	Ken Schrader	MBV Motorsports	Pontiac
40	Sterling Marlin	Chip Ganassi Racing with Felix Sabates	Dodge
43	John Andretti	Petty Enterprises	Dodge
44	Buckshot Jones	Petty Enterprises	Dodge
45	Kyle Petty	Petty Enterprises	Dodge
50	Rick Mast	Midwest Transit Racing	Chevrolet
55	Bobby Hamilton	Andy Petree Racing	Chevrolet
66	Todd Bodine	Haas-Carter Motorsports	Ford
77	Robert Pressley	Jasper Motorsports	Ford
88	Dale Jarrett	Robert Yates Racing	Ford
90	Hut Stricklin	Donlavey Racing	Ford
92	Stacy Compton	Melling Racing	Dodge
93	Dave Blaney	Bill Davis Racing	Dodge
96	Andy Houston (R)	PPI Motorsports	Ford
97	Kurt Busch (R)	Roush Racing	Ford
99	Jeff Burton	Roush Racing	Ford
Official entry list

== Practice ==
=== First practice ===
The first practice session was held on Friday, June 15, at 11:30 AM EST. The session would last for two hours and 30 minutes. Ricky Rudd, driving for Robert Yates Racing, would set the fastest time in the session, with a lap of 53.027 and an average speed of 169.725 mph (273.146 km/h).

Pos.	#	Driver	Team	Make	Time	Speed
1	28	Ricky Rudd	Robert Yates Racing	Ford	53.027	169.725
2	10	Johnny Benson Jr.	MBV Motorsports	Pontiac	53.431	168.442
3	36	Ken Schrader	MB2 Motorsports	Pontiac	53.495	168.240
Full first practice results

=== Second practice ===
The second practice session was held on Saturday, June 16, at 9:00 AM EST. The session would last for 45 minutes. Ricky Rudd, driving for Robert Yates Racing, would set the fastest time in the session, with a lap of 54.434 and an average speed of 165.338 mph (266.086 km/h).

Pos.	#	Driver	Team	Make	Time	Speed
1	28	Ricky Rudd	Robert Yates Racing	Ford	54.434	165.338
2	40	Sterling Marlin	Chip Ganassi Racing	Dodge	54.499	165.141
3	6	Mark Martin	Roush Racing	Ford	54.533	165.038
Full second practice results

=== Final practice ===
The final practice session was held on Saturday, June 16, at 11:15 AM EST. The session would last for one hour. Jeff Gordon, driving for Hendrick Motorsports, would set the fastest time in the session, with a lap of 54.627 and an average speed of 164.754 mph (265.146 km/h).

Pos.	#	Driver	Team	Make	Time	Speed
1	24	Jeff Gordon	Hendrick Motorsports	Chevrolet	54.627	164.754
2	8	Dale Earnhardt Jr.	Dale Earnhardt, Inc.	Chevrolet	54.730	164.444
3	7	Ted Musgrave	Ultra Motorsports	Ford	54.972	163.720
Full final practice results

== Qualifying ==
Qualifying was held on Friday, June 15, at 3:00 PM EST. Each driver would have two laps to set a fastest time; the fastest of the two would count as their official qualifying lap. Positions 1-36 would be decided on time, while positions 37-43 would be based on provisionals. Six spots are awarded by the use of provisionals based on owner's points. The seventh is awarded to a past champion who has not otherwise qualified for the race. If no past champ needs the provisional, the next team in the owner points will be awarded a provisional.

Ricky Rudd, driving for Robert Yates Racing, would win the pole, setting a time of 52.785 and an average speed of 170.503 mph (274.398 km/h).

=== Full qualifying results ===
Pos.	#	Driver	Team	Make	Time	Speed
1	28	Ricky Rudd	Robert Yates Racing	Ford	52.785	170.503
2	40	Sterling Marlin	Chip Ganassi Racing with Felix Sabates	Dodge	53.314	168.811
3	36	Ken Schrader	MB2 Motorsports	Pontiac	53.472	168.312
4	20	Tony Stewart	Joe Gibbs Racing	Pontiac	53.524	168.149
5	6	Mark Martin	Roush Racing	Ford	53.559	168.039
6	8	Dale Earnhardt Jr.	Dale Earnhardt, Inc.	Chevrolet	53.564	168.023
7	10	Johnny Benson Jr.	MBV Motorsports	Pontiac	53.596	167.923
8	99	Jeff Burton	Roush Racing	Ford	53.619	167.851
9	12	Jeremy Mayfield	Penske Racing South	Ford	53.624	167.835
10	88	Dale Jarrett	Robert Yates Racing	Ford	53.627	167.826
11	11	Brett Bodine	Brett Bodine Racing	Ford	53.679	167.663
12	66	Todd Bodine	Haas-Carter Motorsports	Ford	53.683	167.651
13	19	Casey Atwood (R)	Evernham Motorsports	Dodge	53.703	167.588
14	24	Jeff Gordon	Hendrick Motorsports	Chevrolet	53.709	167.570
15	7	Ted Musgrave	Ultra Motorsports	Ford	53.741	167.470
16	2	Rusty Wallace	Penske Racing South	Ford	53.772	167.373
17	15	Michael Waltrip	Dale Earnhardt, Inc.	Chevrolet	53.783	167.339
18	18	Bobby Labonte	Joe Gibbs Racing	Pontiac	53.806	167.268
19	29	Kevin Harvick (R)	Richard Childress Racing	Chevrolet	53.843	167.153
20	43	John Andretti	Petty Enterprises	Dodge	53.852	167.125
21	22	Ward Burton	Bill Davis Racing	Dodge	53.863	167.091
22	92	Stacy Compton	Melling Racing	Dodge	53.891	167.004
23	9	Bill Elliott	Evernham Motorsports	Dodge	53.944	166.840
24	90	Hut Stricklin	Donlavey Racing	Ford	53.972	166.753
25	50	Rick Mast	Midwest Transit Racing	Chevrolet	54.015	166.620
26	31	Mike Skinner	Richard Childress Racing	Chevrolet	54.027	166.583
27	26	Jimmy Spencer	Haas-Carter Motorsports	Ford	54.035	166.559
28	44	Buckshot Jones	Petty Enterprises	Dodge	54.043	166.534
29	93	Dave Blaney	Bill Davis Racing	Dodge	54.077	166.429
30	1	Steve Park	Dale Earnhardt, Inc.	Chevrolet	54.085	166.405
31	17	Matt Kenseth	Roush Racing	Ford	54.097	166.368
32	45	Kyle Petty	Petty Enterprises	Dodge	54.099	166.362
33	01	Jason Leffler (R)	Chip Ganassi Racing with Felix Sabates	Dodge	54.109	166.331
34	32	Ricky Craven	PPI Motorsports	Ford	54.118	166.303
35	14	Ron Hornaday Jr. (R)	A. J. Foyt Enterprises	Pontiac	54.202	166.045
36	4	Kevin Lepage	Morgan–McClure Motorsports	Chevrolet	54.240	165.929
Provisionals
37	55	Bobby Hamilton	Andy Petree Racing	Chevrolet	54.372	165.526
38	21	Elliott Sadler	Wood Brothers Racing	Ford	54.332	165.648
39	25	Jerry Nadeau	Hendrick Motorsports	Chevrolet	54.461	165.256
40	5	Terry Labonte	Hendrick Motorsports	Chevrolet	54.485	165.183
41	97	Kurt Busch (R)	Roush Racing	Ford	54.412	165.405
42	77	Robert Pressley	Jasper Motorsports	Ford	54.310	165.715
43	33	Wally Dallenbach Jr.	Andy Petree Racing	Chevrolet	54.452	165.283
Failed to qualify
44	96	Andy Houston (R)	PPI Motorsports	Ford	54.317	165.694
45	27	Kenny Wallace	Eel River Racing	Pontiac	54.904	163.922
Official qualifying results

== Race results ==
Fin	St	#	Driver	Team	Make	Laps	Led	Status	Pts	Winnings
1	1	28	Ricky Rudd	Robert Yates Racing	Ford	200	39	running	180	$189,542
2	14	24	Jeff Gordon	Hendrick Motorsports	Chevrolet	200	86	running	180	$148,897
3	10	88	Dale Jarrett	Robert Yates Racing	Ford	200	62	running	170	$119,947
4	2	40	Sterling Marlin	Chip Ganassi Racing with Felix Sabates	Dodge	200	0	running	160	$92,350
5	5	6	Mark Martin	Roush Racing	Ford	200	0	running	155	$102,016
6	31	17	Matt Kenseth	Roush Racing	Ford	200	0	running	150	$59,715
7	4	20	Tony Stewart	Joe Gibbs Racing	Pontiac	200	0	running	146	$64,340
8	18	18	Bobby Labonte	Joe Gibbs Racing	Pontiac	200	2	running	147	$94,467
9	3	36	Ken Schrader	MB2 Motorsports	Pontiac	200	0	running	138	$60,960
10	8	99	Jeff Burton	Roush Racing	Ford	200	0	running	134	$91,886
11	29	93	Dave Blaney	Bill Davis Racing	Dodge	200	0	running	130	$43,490
12	26	31	Mike Skinner	Richard Childress Racing	Chevrolet	200	0	running	127	$73,714
13	41	97	Kurt Busch (R)	Roush Racing	Ford	200	0	running	124	$48,940
14	42	77	Robert Pressley	Jasper Motorsports	Ford	200	0	running	121	$53,651
15	19	29	Kevin Harvick (R)	Richard Childress Racing	Chevrolet	200	0	running	118	$83,567
16	16	2	Rusty Wallace	Penske Racing South	Ford	199	0	running	115	$80,580
17	27	26	Jimmy Spencer	Haas-Carter Motorsports	Ford	199	0	running	112	$51,230
18	38	21	Elliott Sadler	Wood Brothers Racing	Ford	199	0	running	109	$59,415
19	39	25	Jerry Nadeau	Hendrick Motorsports	Chevrolet	199	0	running	106	$46,390
20	6	8	Dale Earnhardt Jr.	Dale Earnhardt, Inc.	Chevrolet	199	11	running	108	$73,288
21	36	4	Kevin Lepage	Morgan–McClure Motorsports	Chevrolet	199	0	running	100	$37,440
22	25	50	Rick Mast	Midwest Transit Racing	Chevrolet	199	0	running	97	$33,740
23	22	92	Stacy Compton	Melling Racing	Dodge	198	0	running	94	$36,915
24	7	10	Johnny Benson Jr.	MBV Motorsports	Pontiac	198	0	running	91	$44,665
25	12	66	Todd Bodine	Haas-Carter Motorsports	Ford	198	0	running	88	$37,290
26	43	33	Wally Dallenbach Jr.	Andy Petree Racing	Chevrolet	198	0	running	85	$64,410
27	23	9	Bill Elliott	Evernham Motorsports	Dodge	198	0	running	82	$60,613
28	24	90	Hut Stricklin	Donlavey Racing	Ford	198	0	running	79	$32,740
29	15	7	Ted Musgrave	Ultra Motorsports	Ford	198	0	running	76	$43,565
30	17	15	Michael Waltrip	Dale Earnhardt, Inc.	Chevrolet	197	0	running	73	$42,915
31	40	5	Terry Labonte	Hendrick Motorsports	Chevrolet	195	0	running	70	$67,495
32	30	1	Steve Park	Dale Earnhardt, Inc.	Chevrolet	190	0	running	67	$58,358
33	37	55	Bobby Hamilton	Andy Petree Racing	Chevrolet	187	0	running	64	$39,915
34	32	45	Kyle Petty	Petty Enterprises	Dodge	185	0	engine	61	$31,715
35	35	14	Ron Hornaday Jr. (R)	A. J. Foyt Enterprises	Pontiac	176	0	running	58	$31,540
36	9	12	Jeremy Mayfield	Penske Racing South	Ford	176	0	running	55	$70,624
37	11	11	Brett Bodine	Brett Bodine Racing	Ford	158	0	running	52	$31,175
38	13	19	Casey Atwood (R)	Evernham Motorsports	Dodge	157	0	engine	49	$31,050
39	20	43	John Andretti	Petty Enterprises	Dodge	150	0	running	46	$65,952
40	21	22	Ward Burton	Bill Davis Racing	Dodge	113	0	crash	43	$63,910
41	33	01	Jason Leffler (R)	Chip Ganassi Racing with Felix Sabates	Dodge	100	0	crash	40	$38,650
42	28	44	Buckshot Jones	Petty Enterprises	Dodge	78	0	crash	37	$38,575
43	34	32	Ricky Craven	PPI Motorsports	Ford	34	0	engine	34	$30,751
Official race results

Previous race: 2001 Kmart 400	NASCAR Winston Cup Series; 2001 season	Next race: 2001 Dodge/Save Mart 350
