= 2002 Subway 400 =

Second race of the 2002 NASCAR Winston Cup Series

Race details
- Race 2 of 36 in the 2002 NASCAR Winston Cup Series
- The 2002 Subway 400 program cover.
- Date: February 24, 2002
- Official name: 37th Annual Subway 400
- Location: Rockingham, North Carolina, North Carolina Speedway
- Course: Permanent racing facility
- Course length: 1.017 miles (1.637 km)
- Distance: 393 laps, 399.681 mi (643.224 km)
- Scheduled distance: 393 laps, 399.681 mi (643.224 km)
- Average speed: 115.478 miles per hour (185.844 km/h)

Pole position
Driver	Ricky Craven	PPI Motorsports
- Time: 23.468

Most laps led
Driver	Matt Kenseth	Roush Racing
- Laps: 152

Winner
No. 17	Matt Kenseth	Roush Racing

Television in the United States
- Network: FOX
- Announcers: Mike Joy, Larry McReynolds, Darrell Waltrip

Radio in the United States
- Radio: Motor Racing Network
- Booth announcers: Barney Hall, Joe Moore
- Turn announcers: Kurt Becker, Dave Moody

The 2002 Subway 400 was the second stock car race of the 2002 NASCAR Winston Cup Series and the 37th iteration of the event. The race was held on Sunday, February 24, 2002, in Rockingham, North Carolina, at North Carolina Speedway, a 1.017 miles (1.637 km) permanent high-banked racetrack. The race took the scheduled 393 laps to complete. At race's end, Matt Kenseth, driving for Roush Racing, would dominate the late stages of the race and win under caution when NASCAR determined oil and debris had made racing conditions unsafe with five to go. The win was Kenseth's second career NASCAR Winston Cup Series win and his first win of the season. To fill out the podium, Sterling Marlin of Chip Ganassi Racing and Bobby Labonte of Joe Gibbs Racing would finish second and third, respectively.

The win came under controversy after it was found that Kenseth's car was determined to be lower than minimum height requirements. Penalties were announced on Tuesday, February 26. Kenseth's crew chief, Robbie Reiser, was fined $30,000, but the win for Kenseth would stand. In a radio interview with, Fast Talk with Benny Parsons, Kenseth stated that a dent in the roof, possibly from victory lane celebrations, had caused the car to fail minimum height requirements.

== Background ==
The layout of North Carolina Speedway, the venue where the race was held.

North Carolina Speedway was opened as a flat, one-mile oval on October 31, 1965. In 1969, the track was extensively reconfigured to a high-banked, D-shaped oval just over one mile in length. In 1997, North Carolina Motor Speedway merged with Penske Motorsports, and was renamed North Carolina Speedway. Shortly thereafter, the infield was reconfigured, and competition on the infield road course, mostly by the SCCA, was discontinued. Currently, the track is home to the Fast Track High Performance Driving School.

=== Entry list ===
#	Driver	Team	Make
1	Kenny Wallace	Dale Earnhardt, Inc.	Chevrolet
2	Rusty Wallace	Penske Racing	Ford
4	Mike Skinner	Morgan–McClure Motorsports	Chevrolet
5	Terry Labonte	Hendrick Motorsports	Chevrolet
6	Mark Martin	Roush Racing	Ford
7	Casey Atwood	Ultra-Evernham Motorsports	Dodge
8	Dale Earnhardt Jr.	Dale Earnhardt, Inc.	Chevrolet
9	Bill Elliott	Evernham Motorsports	Dodge
10	Johnny Benson Jr.	MBV Motorsports	Pontiac
11	Brett Bodine	Brett Bodine Racing	Ford
12	Ryan Newman	Penske Racing	Ford
14	Stacy Compton	A. J. Foyt Enterprises	Pontiac
15	Michael Waltrip	Dale Earnhardt, Inc.	Chevrolet
17	Matt Kenseth	Roush Racing	Ford
18	Bobby Labonte	Joe Gibbs Racing	Pontiac
19	Jeremy Mayfield	Evernham Motorsports	Dodge
20	Tony Stewart	Joe Gibbs Racing	Pontiac
21	Elliott Sadler	Wood Brothers Racing	Ford
22	Ward Burton	Bill Davis Racing	Dodge
23	Hut Stricklin	Bill Davis Racing	Dodge
24	Jeff Gordon	Hendrick Motorsports	Chevrolet
25	Jerry Nadeau	Hendrick Motorsports	Chevrolet
26	Joe Nemechek	Haas-Carter Motorsports	Ford
28	Ricky Rudd	Robert Yates Racing	Ford
29	Kevin Harvick	Richard Childress Racing	Chevrolet
30	Jeff Green	Richard Childress Racing	Chevrolet
31	Robby Gordon	Richard Childress Racing	Chevrolet
32	Ricky Craven	PPI Motorsports	Ford
33	Mike Wallace	Andy Petree Racing	Chevrolet
36	Ken Schrader	MB2 Motorsports	Pontiac
40	Sterling Marlin	Chip Ganassi Racing	Dodge
41	Jimmy Spencer	Chip Ganassi Racing	Dodge
43	John Andretti	Petty Enterprises	Dodge
44	Buckshot Jones	Petty Enterprises	Dodge
45	Kyle Petty	Petty Enterprises	Dodge
48	Jimmie Johnson	Hendrick Motorsports	Chevrolet
55	Bobby Hamilton	Andy Petree Racing	Chevrolet
59	Randy Renfrow	Price Motorsports	Dodge
66	Todd Bodine	Haas-Carter Motorsports	Ford
71	Dick Trickle	Marcis Auto Racing	Chevrolet
77	Dave Blaney	Jasper Motorsports	Ford
85	Carl Long	Mansion Motorsports	Ford
88	Dale Jarrett	Robert Yates Racing	Ford
90	Rick Mast	Donlavey Racing	Ford
97	Kurt Busch	Roush Racing	Ford
99	Jeff Burton	Roush Racing	Ford
Official entry list

== Practice ==
=== First practice ===
The first practice session was held on Friday, February 22, at 11:20 AM EST, and would last for two hours. Kyle Petty of Petty Enterprises would set the fastest time in the session, with a lap of 23.816 and an average speed of 153.729 miles per hour (247.403 km/h).

Pos.	#	Driver	Team	Make	Time	Speed
1	45	Kyle Petty	Petty Enterprises	Dodge	23.816	153.729
2	41	Jimmy Spencer	Chip Ganassi Racing	Dodge	23.819	153.708
3	7	Casey Atwood	Ultra-Evernham Motorsports	Dodge	23.825	153.671
Full first practice results

=== Second practice ===
The second practice session was held on Saturday, February 23, at 9:30 AM EST, and would last for 45 minutes. Rusty Wallace of Penske Racing would set the fastest time in the session, with a lap of 24.311 and an average speed of 150.598 miles per hour (242.364 km/h).

Pos.	#	Driver	Team	Make	Time	Speed
1	2	Rusty Wallace	Penske Racing	Ford	24.311	150.598
2	88	Dale Jarrett	Robert Yates Racing	Ford	24.322	150.529
3	9	Bill Elliott	Evernham Motorsports	Dodge	24.329	150.486
Full second practice results

=== Third and final practice ===
The third and final practice session, sometimes referred to as Happy Hour, was held on Saturday, February 23, at 11:15 AM EST, and would last for 45 minutes. John Andretti of Petty Enterprises would set the fastest time in the session, with a lap of 24.249 and an average speed of 150.983 miles per hour (242.984 km/h).

Pos.	#	Driver	Team	Make	Time	Speed
1	43	John Andretti	Petty Enterprises	Dodge	24.249	150.983
2	31	Robby Gordon	Richard Childress Racing	Chevrolet	24.257	150.927
3	18	Bobby Labonte	Joe Gibbs Racing	Pontiac	24.264	150.884
Full Happy Hour practice results

== Qualifying ==
Qualifying was held on Friday, February 22, at 3:05 PM EST. Each driver would have two laps to set a fastest time; the fastest of the two would count as their official qualifying lap. Positions 1–36 would be decided on time, while positions 37–43 would be based on provisionals. Six spots are awarded by the use of provisionals based on owner's points. The seventh is awarded to a past champion who has not otherwise qualified for the race. If no past champ needs the provisional, the next team in the owner points will be awarded a provisional.

Ricky Craven of PPI Motorsports would win the pole, setting a time of 23.468 and an average speed of 156.008 miles per hour (251.071 km/h).

Three drivers would fail to qualify: Dick Trickle, Randy Renfrow, and Carl Long.

=== Full qualifying results ===
Pos.	#	Driver	Team	Make	Time	Speed
1	32	Ricky Craven	PPI Motorsports	Ford	23.468	156.008
2	36	Ken Schrader	MB2 Motorsports	Pontiac	23.666	154.696
3	10	Johnny Benson Jr.	MBV Motorsports	Pontiac	23.677	154.631
4	88	Dale Jarrett	Robert Yates Racing	Ford	23.695	154.507
5	25	Jerry Nadeau	Hendrick Motorsports	Chevrolet	23.718	154.357
6	40	Sterling Marlin	Chip Ganassi Racing	Dodge	23.729	154.292
7	97	Kurt Busch	Roush Racing	Ford	23.742	154.207
8	2	Rusty Wallace	Penske Racing	Ford	23.791	153.883
9	1	Kenny Wallace	Dale Earnhardt, Inc.	Chevrolet	23.816	153.728
10	55	Bobby Hamilton	Andy Petree Racing	Chevrolet	23.820	153.696
11	48	Jimmie Johnson	Hendrick Motorsports	Chevrolet	23.822	153.683
12	41	Jimmy Spencer	Chip Ganassi Racing	Dodge	23.826	153.657
13	44	Buckshot Jones	Petty Enterprises	Dodge	23.844	153.541
14	18	Bobby Labonte	Joe Gibbs Racing	Pontiac	23.847	153.522
15	30	Jeff Green	Richard Childress Racing	Chevrolet	23.853	153.490
16	31	Robby Gordon	Richard Childress Racing	Chevrolet	23.856	153.470
17	6	Mark Martin	Roush Racing	Ford	23.864	153.412
18	22	Ward Burton	Bill Davis Racing	Dodge	23.868	153.393
19	20	Tony Stewart	Joe Gibbs Racing	Pontiac	23.874	153.355
20	7	Casey Atwood	Ultra-Evernham Motorsports	Dodge	23.881	153.310
21	19	Jeremy Mayfield	Evernham Motorsports	Dodge	23.900	153.181
22	99	Jeff Burton	Roush Racing	Ford	23.909	153.124
23	12	Ryan Newman	Penske Racing	Ford	23.910	153.117
24	4	Mike Skinner	Morgan–McClure Motorsports	Chevrolet	23.917	153.072
25	17	Matt Kenseth	Roush Racing	Ford	23.920	153.053
26	15	Michael Waltrip	Dale Earnhardt, Inc.	Chevrolet	23.924	153.028
27	28	Ricky Rudd	Robert Yates Racing	Ford	23.930	152.996
28	9	Bill Elliott	Evernham Motorsports	Dodge	23.930	152.989
29	8	Dale Earnhardt Jr.	Dale Earnhardt, Inc.	Chevrolet	23.954	152.836
30	33	Mike Wallace	Andy Petree Racing	Chevrolet	23.958	152.811
31	11	Brett Bodine	Brett Bodine Racing	Ford	23.969	152.740
32	45	Kyle Petty	Petty Enterprises	Dodge	23.969	152.740
33	24	Jeff Gordon	Hendrick Motorsports	Chevrolet	23.981	152.670
34	29	Kevin Harvick	Richard Childress Racing	Chevrolet	23.985	152.645
35	43	John Andretti	Petty Enterprises	Dodge	23.990	152.607
36	77	Dave Blaney	Jasper Motorsports	Ford	24.035	152.321
Provisionals
37	26	Joe Nemechek	Haas-Carter Motorsports	Ford	24.266	150.877
38	21	Elliott Sadler	Wood Brothers Racing	Ford	24.080	152.036
39	23	Hut Stricklin	Bill Davis Racing	Dodge	24.479	149.558
40	5	Terry Labonte	Hendrick Motorsports	Chevrolet	24.045	152.264
41	66	Todd Bodine	Haas-Carter Motorsports	Ford	24.045	152.258
42	14	Stacy Compton	A. J. Foyt Enterprises	Pontiac	24.084	152.011
43	90	Rick Mast	Donlavey Racing	Ford	24.139	151.665
Failed to qualify
44	71	Dick Trickle	Marcis Auto Racing	Chevrolet	24.069	152.106
45	59	Randy Renfrow	Price Motorsports	Dodge	24.775	147.772
46	85	Carl Long	Mansion Motorsports	Ford	24.840	147.385
Official qualifying results

== Race results ==
Fin	St	#	Driver	Team	Make	Laps	Led	Status	Pts	Winnings
1	25	17	Matt Kenseth	Roush Racing	Ford	393	152	running	185	$157,400
2	6	40	Sterling Marlin	Chip Ganassi Racing	Dodge	393	35	running	175	$125,142
3	14	18	Bobby Labonte	Joe Gibbs Racing	Pontiac	393	0	running	165	$114,178
4	19	20	Tony Stewart	Joe Gibbs Racing	Pontiac	393	0	running	160	$109,378
5	1	32	Ricky Craven	PPI Motorsports	Ford	393	116	running	160	$70,900
6	22	99	Jeff Burton	Roush Racing	Ford	393	0	running	150	$92,377
7	33	24	Jeff Gordon	Hendrick Motorsports	Chevrolet	393	0	running	146	$104,238
8	8	2	Rusty Wallace	Penske Racing	Ford	393	0	running	142	$89,810
9	10	55	Bobby Hamilton	Andy Petree Racing	Chevrolet	393	0	running	138	$76,210
10	9	1	Kenny Wallace	Dale Earnhardt, Inc.	Chevrolet	393	0	running	134	$83,885
11	28	9	Bill Elliott	Evernham Motorsports	Dodge	393	0	running	130	$75,091
12	7	97	Kurt Busch	Roush Racing	Ford	393	0	running	127	$48,310
13	18	22	Ward Burton	Bill Davis Racing	Dodge	393	1	running	129	$77,810
14	23	12	Ryan Newman	Penske Racing	Ford	393	0	running	121	$71,610
15	35	43	John Andretti	Petty Enterprises	Dodge	393	0	running	118	$76,493
16	40	5	Terry Labonte	Hendrick Motorsports	Chevrolet	393	0	running	115	$76,543
17	15	30	Jeff Green	Richard Childress Racing	Chevrolet	393	46	running	117	$42,610
18	27	28	Ricky Rudd	Robert Yates Racing	Ford	393	26	running	114	$86,727
19	34	29	Kevin Harvick	Richard Childress Racing	Chevrolet	393	0	running	106	$87,738
20	12	41	Jimmy Spencer	Chip Ganassi Racing	Dodge	392	0	running	103	$48,660
21	17	6	Mark Martin	Roush Racing	Ford	392	0	running	100	$75,293
22	36	77	Dave Blaney	Jasper Motorsports	Ford	392	0	running	97	$65,860
23	3	10	Johnny Benson Jr.	MBV Motorsports	Pontiac	392	0	running	94	$71,360
24	16	31	Robby Gordon	Richard Childress Racing	Chevrolet	392	0	running	91	$70,266
25	5	25	Jerry Nadeau	Hendrick Motorsports	Chevrolet	391	0	running	88	$51,960
26	29	8	Dale Earnhardt Jr.	Dale Earnhardt, Inc.	Chevrolet	391	0	running	85	$77,587
27	39	23	Hut Stricklin	Bill Davis Racing	Dodge	391	0	running	82	$51,385
28	11	48	Jimmie Johnson	Hendrick Motorsports	Chevrolet	390	0	running	79	$40,035
29	21	19	Jeremy Mayfield	Evernham Motorsports	Dodge	390	0	running	76	$50,872
30	31	11	Brett Bodine	Brett Bodine Racing	Ford	390	0	running	73	$53,700
31	38	21	Elliott Sadler	Wood Brothers Racing	Ford	390	0	running	70	$58,964
32	41	66	Todd Bodine	Haas-Carter Motorsports	Ford	387	0	running	67	$42,000
33	37	26	Joe Nemechek	Haas-Carter Motorsports	Ford	386	0	running	64	$64,512
34	43	90	Rick Mast	Donlavey Racing	Ford	385	0	running	61	$39,250
35	2	36	Ken Schrader	MB2 Motorsports	Pontiac	384	0	engine	58	$47,350
36	24	4	Mike Skinner	Morgan–McClure Motorsports	Chevrolet	362	0	engine	55	$39,050
37	32	45	Kyle Petty	Petty Enterprises	Dodge	332	0	running	52	$39,000
38	30	33	Mike Wallace	Andy Petree Racing	Chevrolet	288	0	running	49	$46,940
39	20	7	Casey Atwood	Ultra-Evernham Motorsports	Dodge	281	0	running	46	$38,890
40	26	15	Michael Waltrip	Dale Earnhardt, Inc.	Chevrolet	173	0	engine	43	$46,815
41	13	44	Buckshot Jones	Petty Enterprises	Dodge	153	0	crash	40	$38,765
42	4	88	Dale Jarrett	Robert Yates Racing	Ford	145	17	engine	42	$86,563
43	42	14	Stacy Compton	A. J. Foyt Enterprises	Pontiac	25	0	engine	34	$38,009
Official race results

Previous race: 2002 Daytona 500	NASCAR Winston Cup Series; 2002 season	Next race: 2002 UAW-DaimlerChrysler 400
