= 2001 MBNA Platinum 400 =

Race details
- Race 13 of 36 of 2001 in the 2001 NASCAR Winston Cup Series
- 2001 MBNA Platinum 400 program cover
- Date: June 3, 2001
- Location: Dover Downs International Speedway, Dover, Delaware
- Course: Permanent racing facility
- Course length: 1 miles (1.6 km)
- Distance: 400 laps, 400 mi (804.6 km)
- Weather: Temperatures reaching up to 71.6 °F (22.0 °C); wind speeds approaching 15 miles per hour (24 km/h)
- Average speed: 120.361 miles per hour (193.702 km/h)

Pole position
Driver	Dale Jarrett	Yates Racing
- Time: N/A

Most laps led
Driver	Jeff Gordon	Hendrick Motorsports
- Laps: 381

Winner
No. 24	Jeff Gordon	Hendrick Motorsports

Television in the United States
- Network: Fox Broadcasting Network
- Announcers: Mike Joy, Larry McReynolds, Darrell Waltrip

The 2001 MBNA Platinum 400 was a NASCAR Winston Cup Series event held on June 3, 2001, at Dover Downs International Speedway in Dover, Delaware.

Qualifying was rained out, and Dale Jarrett would start on pole.

Contested over 400 laps, it was the thirteenth race of the 2001 season. Jeff Gordon of Hendrick Motorsports took his second win of the season leading 381 out of the 400 laps, while Steve Park finished second and Dale Earnhardt Jr. finished third. Jarrett retained his points lead but was reduced from 75 points to 50.

Sixteen lead changes were made in this 199-minute event. While the average green flag run was almost 62 laps, more than 7% of the race was held under a caution flag.

== Report ==
=== Background ===
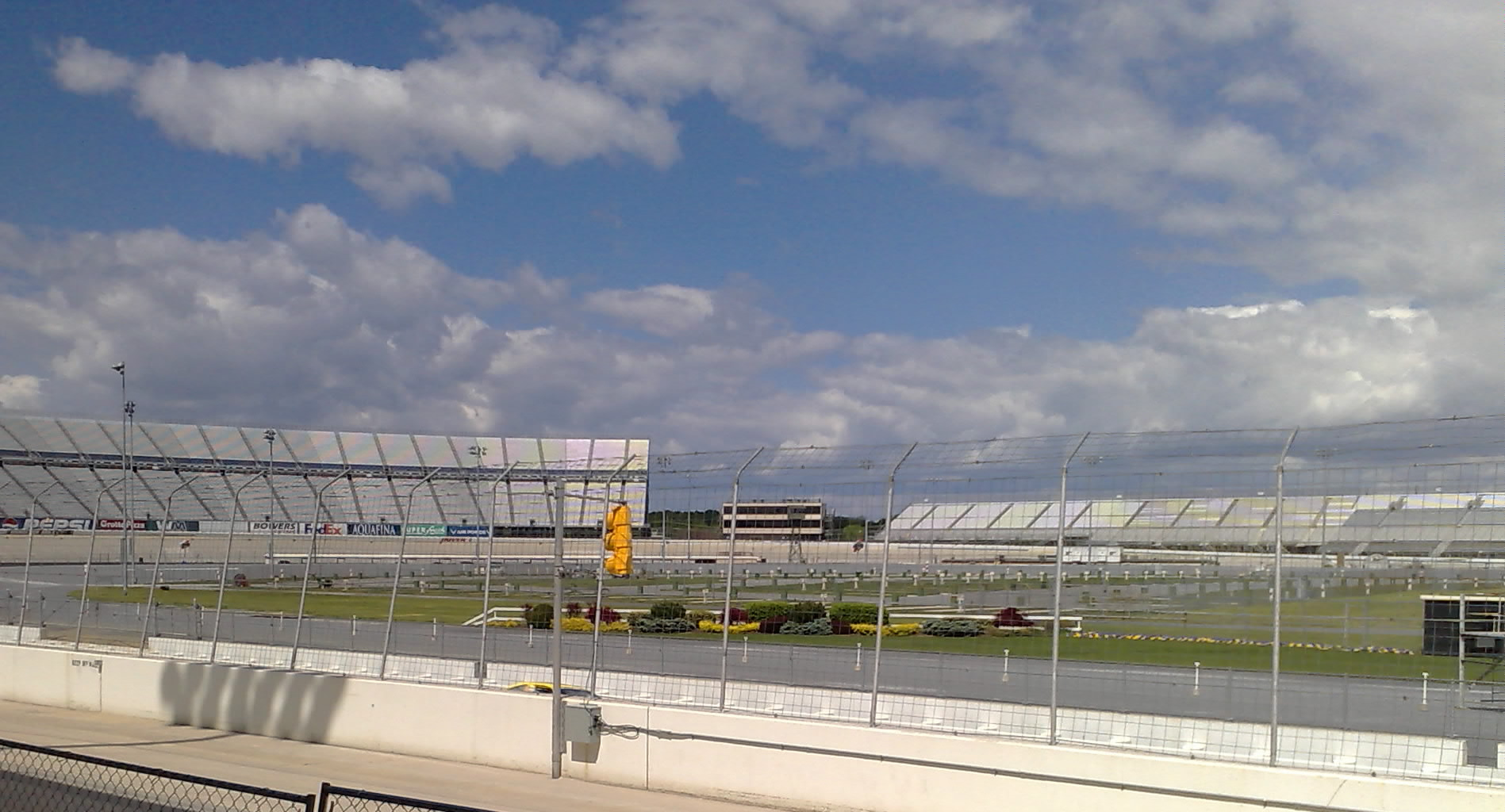
Dover International Speedway, where the race was held.

Dover Downs International Speedway, now called Dover International Speedway is one of five short tracks to hold NASCAR races. The NASCAR race makes use of the track's standard configuration, a four-turn short track oval that is 1 mile (1.6 km) long. The track's turns are banked at twenty-four degrees, and both the front stretch (the location of the finish line) and the backstretch are banked at nine degrees.

== Entry list ==
#	Driver	Team	Make
1	Steve Park	Dale Earnhardt, Inc.	Chevrolet
01	Jason Leffler	Chip Ganassi Racing with Felix Sabates	Dodge
2	Rusty Wallace	Penske Racing	Ford
4	Kevin Lepage	Morgan–McClure Motorsports	Pontiac
5	Terry Labonte	Hendrick Motorsports	Chevrolet
6	Mark Martin	Roush Racing	Ford
7	Mike Wallace	Ultra Motorsports	Ford
8	Dale Earnhardt Jr.	Dale Earnhardt, Inc.	Chevrolet
9	Bill Elliott	Evernham Motorsports	Dodge
10	Johnny Benson Jr.	MBV Motorsports	Pontiac
11	Brett Bodine	Brett Bodine Racing	Ford
12	Jeremy Mayfield	Penske Racing	Ford
14	Ron Hornaday Jr.	A.J. Foyt Racing	Chevrolet
15	Michael Waltrip	Dale Earnhardt, Inc.	Chevrolet
17	Matt Kenseth	Roush Racing	Ford
18	Bobby Labonte	Joe Gibbs Racing	Pontiac
19	Casey Atwood	Evernham Motorsports	Dodge
20	Tony Stewart	Joe Gibbs Racing	Toyota
21	Elliott Sadler	Wood Brothers Racing	Ford
22	Ward Burton	Bill Davis Racing	Pontiac
24	Jeff Gordon	Hendrick Motorsports	Chevrolet
25	Jerry Nadeau	Hendrick Motorsports	Chevrolet
26	Jimmy Spencer	Haas-Carter Motorsports	Ford
27	Kenny Wallace	Eel River Racing	Pontiac
28	Ricky Rudd	Robert Yates Racing	Ford
29	Kevin Harvick	Richard Childress Racing	Chevrolet
30	Jeff Green	Richard Childress Racing	Chevrolet
31	Mike Skinner	Richard Childress Racing	Chevrolet
32	Ricky Craven	PPI Motorsports	Chevrolet
33	Bobby Hamilton Jr.	Andy Petree Racing	Chevrolet
36	Ken Schrader	MBV Motorsports	Pontiac
40	Sterling Marlin	Chip Ganassi Racing with Felix Sabates	Dodge
43	John Andretti	Petty Enterprises	Dodge
44	Buckshot Jones	Petty Enterprises	Dodge
45	Kyle Petty	Petty Enterprises	Ford
47	Lance Hooper	Dark Horse Motorsports	Chevrolet
50	Rick Mast	Midwest Transit Racing	Chevrolet
55	Bobby Hamilton	Andy Petree Racing	Chevrolet
66	Todd Bodine	Haas-Carter Motorsports	Ford
71	Dave Marcis	Marcis Auto Racing	Chevrolet
77	Robert Pressley	Jasper Motorsports	Ford
88	Dale Jarrett	Robert Yates Racing	Ford
90	Hut Stricklin	Donlavey Racing	Ford
92	Stacy Compton	Melling Racing	Dodge
93	Dave Blaney	Bill Davis Racing	Dodge
96	Andy Houston	PPI Motorsports	Ford
97	Kurt Busch	Roush Racing	Ford
99	Jeff Burton	Roush Racing	Ford

== Qualifying ==
Qualifying was rained out, thus Dale Jarrett would win the pole based on the 2001 NASCAR Winston Cup Series rulebook.

Pos.	#	Driver	Make	Team
1	88	Dale Jarrett	Ford	Robert Yates Racing
2	24	Jeff Gordon	Chevrolet	Hendrick Motorsports
3	2	Rusty Wallace	Ford	Penske Racing
4	10	Johnny Benson Jr.	Pontiac	MBV Motorsports
5	28	Ricky Rudd	Ford	Robert Yates Racing
6	20	Tony Stewart	Pontiac	Joe Gibbs Racing
7	40	Sterling Marlin	Dodge	Chip Ganassi Racing with Felix Sabates
8	29	Kevin Harvick	Chevrolet	Richard Childress Racing
9	1	Steve Park	Chevrolet	Dale Earnhardt, Inc.
10	55	Bobby Hamilton	Chevrolet	Andy Petree Racing
11	8	Dale Earnhardt Jr.	Chevrolet	Dale Earnhardt, Inc.
12	18	Bobby Labonte	Pontiac	Joe Gibbs Racing
13	17	Matt Kenseth	Ford	Roush Racing
14	26	Jimmy Spencer	Ford	Haas-Carter Motorsports
15	21	Elliott Sadler	Ford	Wood Brothers Racing
16	9	Bill Elliott	Dodge	Evernham Motorsports
17	25	Jerry Nadeau	Chevrolet	Hendrick Motorsports
18	6	Mark Martin	Ford	Roush Racing
19	22	Ward Burton	Dodge	Bill Davis Racing
20	97	Kurt Busch	Ford	Roush Racing
21	99	Jeff Burton	Ford	Roush Racing
22	36	Ken Schrader	Pontiac	MBV Motorsports
23	5	Terry Labonte	Chevrolet	Hendrick Motorsports
24	12	Jeremy Mayfield	Ford	Penske Racing
25	33	Bobby Hamilton Jr.	Chevrolet	Andy Petree Racing
26	31	Mike Skinner	Chevrolet	Richard Childress Racing
27	15	Michael Waltrip	Chevrolet	Dale Earnhardt, Inc.
28	77	Robert Pressley	Ford	Jasper Motorsports
29	93	Dave Blaney	Dodge	Bill Davis Racing
30	32	Ricky Craven	Ford	PPI Motorsports
31	43	John Andretti	Dodge	Petty Enterprises
32	92	Stacy Compton	Dodge	Melling Racing
33	7	Mike Wallace	Ford	Ultra Motorsports
34	4	Kevin Lepage	Chevrolet	Morgan–McClure Motorsports
35	14	Ron Hornaday Jr.	Pontiac	A.J. Foyt Racing
36	19	Casey Atwood	Dodge	Evernham Motorsports
37	11	Brett Bodine	Ford	Brett Bodine Racing
38	01	Jason Leffler	Dodge	Chip Ganassi Racing with Felix Sabates
39	66	Todd Bodine	Ford	Haas-Carter Motorsports
40	44	Buckshot Jones	Dodge	Petty Enterprises
41	96	Andy Houston	Ford	PPI Motorsports
42	90	Hut Stricklin	Ford	Donlavey Racing
43	27	Kenny Wallace	Pontiac	Eel River Racing
Failed to qualify
44	50	Rick Mast	Chevrolet	Midwest Transit Racing
45	30	Jeff Green	Chevrolet	Richard Childress Racing
46	45	Kyle Petty	Dodge	Petty Enterprises
47	47	Lance Hooper	Ford	Dark Horse Motorsports
48	71	Dave Marcis	Chevrolet	Marcis Auto Racing

== Results ==
Fin	St	#	Driver	Make	Team	Sponsor	Laps	Led	Status	Pts	Winnings
1	2	24	Jeff Gordon	Chevrolet	Hendrick Motorsports	DuPont Automotive	400	381	running	185	$183907
2	9	1	Steve Park	Chevrolet	Dale Earnhardt, Inc.	Pennzoil	400	0	running	170	$128148
3	11	8	Dale Earnhardt Jr.	Chevrolet	Dale Earnhardt, Inc.	Budweiser	400	3	running	170	$113648
4	30	32	Ricky Craven	Ford	PPI Motorsports	Tide	400	8	running	165	$79900
5	1	88	Dale Jarrett	Ford	Robert Yates Racing	UPS	400	1	running	160	$115007
6	7	40	Sterling Marlin	Dodge	Chip Ganassi Racing with Felix Sabates	Coors Light	400	1	running	155	$82340
7	6	20	Tony Stewart	Pontiac	Joe Gibbs Racing	Home Depot	400	2	running	151	$73260
8	8	29	Kevin Harvick	Chevrolet	Richard Childress Racing	GM Goodwrench	400	0	running	142	$98487
9	18	6	Mark Martin	Ford	Roush Racing	Viagra, Pfizer	400	3	running	143	$94911
10	5	28	Ricky Rudd	Ford	Robert Yates Racing	Texaco, Havoline	400	0	running	134	$91007
11	26	31	Mike Skinner	Chevrolet	Richard Childress Racing	Lowe's	400	0	running	130	$86859
12	12	18	Bobby Labonte	Pontiac	Joe Gibbs Racing	Interstate Batteries	400	0	running	127	$99712
13	38	01	Jason Leffler	Dodge	Chip Ganassi Racing with Felix Sabates	Cingular Wireless, Special Olympics	400	0	running	124	$67565
14	19	22	Ward Burton	Dodge	Bill Davis Racing	Caterpillar	399	0	running	121	$83970
15	39	66	Todd Bodine	Ford	Haas-Carter Motorsports	Kmart Blue Light Special	399	0	running	118	$53135
16	13	17	Matt Kenseth	Ford	Roush Racing	DeWalt	399	0	running	115	$58435
17	23	5	Terry Labonte	Chevrolet	Hendrick Motorsports	Kellogg's	399	0	running	112	$82480
18	15	21	Elliott Sadler	Ford	Wood Brothers Racing	Motorcraft	399	0	running	109	$73546
19	31	43	John Andretti	Dodge	Petty Enterprises	Cheerios	398	0	running	106	$84137
20	10	55	Bobby Hamilton	Chevrolet	Andy Petree Racing	Square D	398	0	running	103	$60760
21	3	2	Rusty Wallace	Ford	Penske Racing	Miller Lite	397	1	running	105	$90450
22	28	77	Robert Pressley	Ford	Jasper Motorsports	Jasper Engines & Transmissions	397	0	running	97	$61050
23	41	96	Andy Houston	Ford	PPI Motorsports	McDonald's	397	0	running	94	$48710
24	34	4	Kevin Lepage	Chevrolet	Morgan–McClure Motorsports	Kodak	397	0	running	91	$51030
25	37	11	Brett Bodine	Ford	Brett Bodine Racing	Ralph's, Red Cell Batteries	397	0	running	88	$48580
26	40	44	Buckshot Jones	Dodge	Petty Enterprises	Georgia-Pacific	396	0	running	85	$55530
27	43	27	Kenny Wallace	Pontiac	Eel River Racing	Duke's Mayonnaise, Sauer's	396	0	running	82	$46880
28	33	7	Mike Wallace	Ford	Ultra Motorsports	NationsRent	394	0	running	79	$52205
29	36	19	Casey Atwood	Dodge	Evernham Motorsports	Dodge Dealers, UAW	391	0	running	76	$44055
30	42	90	Hut Stricklin	Ford	Donlavey Racing	Hills Brothers Coffee	391	0	running	73	$44405
31	21	99	Jeff Burton	Ford	Roush Racing	Citgo Supergard	390	0	running	70	$89501
32	32	92	Stacy Compton	Dodge	Melling Racing	Kodiak	387	0	running	67	$43595
33	29	93	Dave Blaney	Dodge	Bill Davis Racing	Amoco	385	0	running	64	$43445
34	24	12	Jeremy Mayfield	Ford	Penske Racing	Mobil 1	377	0	transmission	61	$82554
35	35	14	Ron Hornaday Jr.	Pontiac	A.J. Foyt Racing	Conseco	359	0	rear end	58	$43120
36	22	36	Ken Schrader	Pontiac	MBV Motorsports	M&M's	326	0	running	55	$51005
37	14	26	Jimmy Spencer	Ford	Haas-Carter Motorsports	Kmart	300	0	crash	52	$50895
38	17	25	Jerry Nadeau	Chevrolet	Hendrick Motorsports	UAW-Delphi	258	0	crash	49	$50785
39	20	97	Kurt Busch	Ford	Roush Racing	Sharpie, Rubbermaid	247	0	crash	46	$50675
40	16	9	Bill Elliott	Dodge	Evernham Motorsports	Dodge Dealers, UAW	153	0	running	43	$67263
41	4	10	Johnny Benson Jr.	Pontiac	MBV Motorsports	Valvoline	118	0	engine	40	$50430
42	25	33	Bobby Hamilton Jr.	Chevrolet	Andy Petree Racing	Oakwood Homes	72	0	overheating	37	$70590
43	27	15	Michael Waltrip	Chevrolet	Dale Earnhardt, Inc.	NAPA Auto Parts	2	0	crash	34	$52461

Previous race: 2001 Coca-Cola 600	Winston Cup Series; 2001 season	Next race: 2001 Kmart 400
