= 2001 Kmart 400 =

14th race of the 2001 NASCAR Winston Cup Series

Race details
- Race 14 of 36 in the 2001 NASCAR Winston Cup Series
- The 2001 Kmart 400 program cover.
- Date: June 10, 2001
- Official name: 33rd Annual Kmart 400
- Location: Cambridge Township, Michigan, Michigan International Speedway
- Course: Permanent racing facility
- Course length: 2 miles (3.2 km)
- Distance: 200 laps, 400 mi (643.737 km)
- Scheduled distance: 200 laps, 400 mi (643.737 km)
- Average speed: 134.203 miles per hour (215.979 km/h)

Pole position
Driver	Jeff Gordon	Hendrick Motorsports
- Time: 38.247

Most laps led
Driver	Jeff Gordon	Hendrick Motorsports
- Laps: 143

Winner
No. 24	Jeff Gordon	Hendrick Motorsports

Television in the United States
- Network: FX
- Announcers: Mike Joy, Larry McReynolds, Darrell Waltrip

Radio in the United States
- Radio: Motor Racing Network

The 2001 Kmart 400 was the 14th stock car race of the 2001 NASCAR Winston Cup Series and the 33rd iteration of the event. The race was held on Sunday, June 10, 2001, in Cambridge Township, Michigan, at Michigan International Speedway, a 2 miles (3.2 km) moderate-banked D-shaped speedway. The race took the scheduled 200 laps to complete. At race's end, Jeff Gordon, driving for Hendrick Motorsports, would manage to hold off the field on the final restart with four to go to win his 55th career NASCAR Winston Cup Series win and his third of the season. The win was also Hendrick Motorsports' 100th NASCAR Winston Cup Series victory. To fill out the podium, Ricky Rudd, driving for Robert Yates Racing, and Sterling Marlin, driving for Chip Ganassi Racing with Felix Sabates, would finish second and third, respectively.

== Background ==
The layout of Michigan International Speedway, the venue where the race was held.

The race was held at Michigan International Speedway, a 2 miles (3.2 km) moderate-banked D-shaped speedway located in Cambridge Township, Michigan. The track is used primarily for NASCAR events. It is known as a "sister track" to Texas World Speedway as MIS's oval design was a direct basis of TWS, with moderate modifications to the banking in the corners, and was used as the basis of Auto Club Speedway. The track is owned by International Speedway Corporation. Michigan International Speedway is recognized as one of motorsports' premier facilities because of its wide racing surface and high banking (by open-wheel standards; the 18-degree banking is modest by stock car standards).

=== Entry list ===
- (R) denotes rookie driver.
- (i) denotes driver who is ineligible for series driver points.

#	Driver	Team	Make
1	Steve Park	Dale Earnhardt, Inc.	Chevrolet
01	Jason Leffler (R)	Chip Ganassi Racing with Felix Sabates	Dodge
2	Rusty Wallace	Penske Racing South	Ford
02	Ryan Newman (i)	Penske Racing South	Ford
4	Kevin Lepage	Morgan–McClure Motorsports	Chevrolet
5	Terry Labonte	Hendrick Motorsports	Chevrolet
6	Mark Martin	Roush Racing	Ford
7	Mike Wallace	Ultra Motorsports	Ford
8	Dale Earnhardt Jr.	Dale Earnhardt, Inc.	Chevrolet
9	Bill Elliott	Evernham Motorsports	Dodge
10	Johnny Benson Jr.	MBV Motorsports	Pontiac
11	Brett Bodine	Brett Bodine Racing	Ford
12	Jeremy Mayfield	Penske Racing South	Ford
14	Ron Hornaday Jr. (R)	A. J. Foyt Enterprises	Pontiac
15	Michael Waltrip	Dale Earnhardt, Inc.	Chevrolet
17	Matt Kenseth	Roush Racing	Ford
18	Bobby Labonte	Joe Gibbs Racing	Pontiac
19	Casey Atwood (R)	Evernham Motorsports	Dodge
20	Tony Stewart	Joe Gibbs Racing	Pontiac
21	Elliott Sadler	Wood Brothers Racing	Ford
22	Ward Burton	Bill Davis Racing	Dodge
24	Jeff Gordon	Hendrick Motorsports	Chevrolet
25	Jerry Nadeau	Hendrick Motorsports	Chevrolet
26	Jimmy Spencer	Haas-Carter Motorsports	Ford
27	Kenny Wallace	Eel River Racing	Pontiac
28	Ricky Rudd	Robert Yates Racing	Ford
29	Kevin Harvick (R)	Richard Childress Racing	Chevrolet
30	Jeff Green	Richard Childress Racing	Chevrolet
31	Mike Skinner	Richard Childress Racing	Chevrolet
32	Ricky Craven	PPI Motorsports	Ford
33	Bobby Hamilton Jr.	Andy Petree Racing	Chevrolet
36	Ken Schrader	MBV Motorsports	Pontiac
40	Sterling Marlin	Chip Ganassi Racing with Felix Sabates	Dodge
43	John Andretti	Petty Enterprises	Dodge
44	Buckshot Jones	Petty Enterprises	Dodge
45	Kyle Petty	Petty Enterprises	Dodge
50	Rick Mast	Midwest Transit Racing	Chevrolet
55	Bobby Hamilton	Andy Petree Racing	Chevrolet
66	Todd Bodine	Haas-Carter Motorsports	Ford
77	Robert Pressley	Jasper Motorsports	Ford
84	Shawna Robinson	Michael Kranefuss Racing	Ford
88	Dale Jarrett	Robert Yates Racing	Ford
90	Hut Stricklin	Donlavey Racing	Ford
92	Stacy Compton	Melling Racing	Dodge
93	Dave Blaney	Bill Davis Racing	Dodge
96	Andy Houston (R)	PPI Motorsports	Ford
97	Kurt Busch (R)	Roush Racing	Ford
99	Jeff Burton	Roush Racing	Ford
Official entry list

== Practice ==
=== First practice ===
The first practice session was held on Friday, June 8, at 12:00 PM EST. The session would last for two hours. Ryan Newman, driving for Penske Racing South, would set the fastest time in the session, with a lap of 38.467 and an average speed of 187.173 mph (301.226 km/h).

Pos.	#	Driver	Team	Make	Time	Speed
1	02	Ryan Newman (i)	Penske Racing South	Ford	38.467	187.173
2	32	Ricky Craven	PPI Motorsports	Ford	38.469	187.164
3	28	Ricky Rudd	Robert Yates Racing	Ford	38.473	187.144
Full first practice results

=== Second practice ===
The second practice session was held on Saturday, June 9, at 9:00 AM EST. The session would last for 45 minutes. Jeff Gordon, driving for Hendrick Motorsports, would set the fastest time in the session, with a lap of 38.913 and an average speed of 185.028 mph (297.774 km/h).

Pos.	#	Driver	Team	Make	Time	Speed
1	24	Jeff Gordon	Hendrick Motorsports	Chevrolet	38.913	185.028
2	8	Dale Earnhardt Jr.	Dale Earnhardt, Inc.	Chevrolet	39.104	184.124
3	88	Dale Jarrett	Robert Yates Racing	Ford	39.133	183.988
Full second practice results

=== Final practice ===
The final practice session was held on Saturday, June 9, at 10:30 AM EST. The session would last for one hour and 30 minutes. Rusty Wallace, driving for Penske Racing South, would set the fastest time in the session, with a lap of 39.462 and an average speed of 182.454 mph (293.631 km/h).

Pos.	#	Driver	Team	Make	Time	Speed
1	2	Rusty Wallace	Penske Racing South	Ford	39.462	182.454
2	10	Johnny Benson Jr.	MBV Motorsports	Pontiac	39.534	182.122
3	8	Dale Earnhardt Jr.	Dale Earnhardt, Inc.	Chevrolet	39.566	181.974
Full final practice results

== Qualifying ==
Qualifying was held on Friday, June 8, at 3:10 PM EST. Each driver would have two laps to set a fastest time; the fastest of the two would count as their official qualifying lap. Positions 1-36 would be decided on time, while positions 37-43 would be based on provisionals. Six spots are awarded by the use of provisionals based on owner's points. The seventh is awarded to a past champion who has not otherwise qualified for the race. If no past champ needs the provisional, the next team in the owner points will be awarded a provisional.

Jeff Gordon, driving for Hendrick Motorsports, would win the pole, setting a time of 38.247 and an average speed of 188.250 mph (302.959 km/h).

Five drivers would fail to qualify: Mike Wallace, Rick Mast, Andy Houston, Stacy Compton, and Kenny Wallace.

=== Full qualifying results ===
Pos.	#	Driver	Team	Make	Time	Speed
1	24	Jeff Gordon	Hendrick Motorsports	Chevrolet	38.247	188.250
2	28	Ricky Rudd	Robert Yates Racing	Ford	38.249	188.240
3	31	Mike Skinner	Richard Childress Racing	Chevrolet	38.361	187.691
4	93	Dave Blaney	Bill Davis Racing	Dodge	38.365	187.671
5	32	Ricky Craven	PPI Motorsports	Ford	38.372	187.637
6	9	Bill Elliott	Evernham Motorsports	Dodge	38.405	187.476
7	8	Dale Earnhardt Jr.	Dale Earnhardt, Inc.	Chevrolet	38.409	187.456
8	29	Kevin Harvick (R)	Richard Childress Racing	Chevrolet	38.412	187.441
9	12	Jeremy Mayfield	Penske Racing South	Ford	38.433	187.339
10	10	Johnny Benson Jr.	MBV Motorsports	Pontiac	38.480	187.110
11	97	Kurt Busch (R)	Roush Racing	Ford	38.509	186.969
12	02	Ryan Newman (i)	Penske Racing South	Ford	38.514	186.945
13	99	Jeff Burton	Roush Racing	Ford	38.529	186.872
14	26	Jimmy Spencer	Haas-Carter Motorsports	Ford	38.533	186.853
15	43	John Andretti	Petty Enterprises	Dodge	38.594	186.557
16	1	Steve Park	Dale Earnhardt, Inc.	Chevrolet	38.595	186.553
17	30	Jeff Green	Richard Childress Racing	Chevrolet	38.614	186.461
18	2	Rusty Wallace	Penske Racing South	Ford	38.639	186.340
19	33	Bobby Hamilton Jr.	Andy Petree Racing	Chevrolet	38.645	186.311
20	6	Mark Martin	Roush Racing	Ford	38.653	186.273
21	88	Dale Jarrett	Robert Yates Racing	Ford	38.663	186.225
22	45	Kyle Petty	Petty Enterprises	Dodge	38.720	185.950
23	90	Hut Stricklin	Donlavey Racing	Ford	38.730	185.902
24	44	Buckshot Jones	Petty Enterprises	Dodge	38.750	185.806
25	18	Bobby Labonte	Joe Gibbs Racing	Pontiac	38.753	185.792
26	4	Kevin Lepage	Morgan–McClure Motorsports	Chevrolet	38.778	185.672
27	14	Ron Hornaday Jr. (R)	A. J. Foyt Enterprises	Pontiac	38.778	185.672
28	11	Brett Bodine	Brett Bodine Racing	Ford	38.780	185.663
29	40	Sterling Marlin	Chip Ganassi Racing with Felix Sabates	Dodge	38.784	185.644
30	66	Todd Bodine	Haas-Carter Motorsports	Ford	38.789	185.620
31	17	Matt Kenseth	Roush Racing	Ford	38.808	185.529
32	84	Shawna Robinson	Michael Kranefuss Racing	Ford	38.808	185.529
33	36	Ken Schrader	MB2 Motorsports	Pontiac	38.809	185.524
34	19	Casey Atwood (R)	Evernham Motorsports	Dodge	38.822	185.462
35	15	Michael Waltrip	Dale Earnhardt, Inc.	Chevrolet	38.825	185.448
36	01	Jason Leffler (R)	Chip Ganassi Racing with Felix Sabates	Dodge	38.845	185.352
Provisionals
37	20	Tony Stewart	Joe Gibbs Racing	Pontiac	39.111	184.091
38	55	Bobby Hamilton	Andy Petree Racing	Chevrolet	39.335	183.043
39	21	Elliott Sadler	Wood Brothers Racing	Ford	38.980	184.710
40	22	Ward Burton	Bill Davis Racing	Dodge	38.950	184.852
41	25	Jerry Nadeau	Hendrick Motorsports	Chevrolet	39.096	184.162
42	5	Terry Labonte	Hendrick Motorsports	Chevrolet	38.864	185.261
43	77	Robert Pressley	Jasper Motorsports	Ford	38.851	185.323
Failed to qualify
44	7	Mike Wallace	Ultra Motorsports	Ford	38.920	184.995
45	50	Rick Mast	Midwest Transit Racing	Chevrolet	38.945	184.876
46	96	Andy Houston (R)	PPI Motorsports	Ford	39.005	184.592
47	92	Stacy Compton	Melling Racing	Dodge	39.312	183.150
48	27	Kenny Wallace	Eel River Racing	Pontiac	39.379	182.830
Official qualifying results

== Race results ==
Fin	St	#	Driver	Team	Make	Laps	Led	Status	Pts	Winnings
1	1	24	Jeff Gordon	Hendrick Motorsports	Chevrolet	200	143	running	185	$240,137
2	2	28	Ricky Rudd	Robert Yates Racing	Ford	200	3	running	175	$123,257
3	29	40	Sterling Marlin	Chip Ganassi Racing with Felix Sabates	Dodge	200	28	running	170	$95,280
4	9	12	Jeremy Mayfield	Penske Racing South	Ford	200	0	running	160	$98,814
5	12	02	Ryan Newman (i)	Penske Racing South	Ford	200	0	running	0	$47,315
6	23	90	Hut Stricklin	Donlavey Racing	Ford	200	0	running	150	$57,140
7	13	99	Jeff Burton	Roush Racing	Ford	200	0	running	146	$91,286
8	4	93	Dave Blaney	Bill Davis Racing	Dodge	200	0	running	142	$47,965
9	6	9	Bill Elliott	Evernham Motorsports	Dodge	200	0	running	138	$71,638
10	8	29	Kevin Harvick (R)	Richard Childress Racing	Chevrolet	200	0	running	134	$94,042
11	14	26	Jimmy Spencer	Haas-Carter Motorsports	Ford	200	0	running	130	$62,735
12	10	10	Johnny Benson Jr.	MBV Motorsports	Pontiac	200	11	running	132	$53,400
13	25	18	Bobby Labonte	Joe Gibbs Racing	Pontiac	200	0	running	124	$92,317
14	33	36	Ken Schrader	MB2 Motorsports	Pontiac	200	0	running	121	$57,701
15	31	17	Matt Kenseth	Roush Racing	Ford	200	10	running	123	$54,040
16	20	6	Mark Martin	Roush Racing	Ford	199	0	running	115	$83,041
17	17	30	Jeff Green	Richard Childress Racing	Chevrolet	199	0	running	0	$38,390
18	21	88	Dale Jarrett	Robert Yates Racing	Ford	199	0	running	109	$83,117
19	36	01	Jason Leffler (R)	Chip Ganassi Racing with Felix Sabates	Dodge	199	0	running	106	$54,080
20	3	31	Mike Skinner	Richard Childress Racing	Chevrolet	199	0	running	103	$78,014
21	43	77	Robert Pressley	Jasper Motorsports	Ford	199	0	running	100	$52,115
22	38	55	Bobby Hamilton	Andy Petree Racing	Chevrolet	199	0	running	97	$48,440
23	16	1	Steve Park	Dale Earnhardt, Inc.	Chevrolet	199	0	running	94	$66,333
24	19	33	Bobby Hamilton Jr.	Andy Petree Racing	Chevrolet	199	0	running	91	$68,060
25	37	20	Tony Stewart	Joe Gibbs Racing	Pontiac	198	0	running	88	$57,490
26	42	5	Terry Labonte	Hendrick Motorsports	Chevrolet	198	0	running	85	$71,970
27	22	45	Kyle Petty	Petty Enterprises	Dodge	198	0	running	82	$35,990
28	41	25	Jerry Nadeau	Hendrick Motorsports	Chevrolet	198	0	running	79	$46,840
29	35	15	Michael Waltrip	Dale Earnhardt, Inc.	Chevrolet	198	0	running	76	$45,640
30	34	19	Casey Atwood (R)	Evernham Motorsports	Dodge	198	0	running	73	$39,065
31	26	4	Kevin Lepage	Morgan–McClure Motorsports	Chevrolet	198	0	running	70	$37,915
32	27	14	Ron Hornaday Jr. (R)	A. J. Foyt Enterprises	Pontiac	197	0	running	67	$35,340
33	28	11	Brett Bodine	Brett Bodine Racing	Ford	197	0	running	64	$35,265
34	32	84	Shawna Robinson	Michael Kranefuss Racing	Ford	197	0	running	61	$35,190
35	5	32	Ricky Craven	PPI Motorsports	Ford	196	0	running	58	$35,115
36	24	44	Buckshot Jones	Petty Enterprises	Dodge	188	1	engine	60	$43,065
37	15	43	John Andretti	Petty Enterprises	Dodge	186	0	crash	52	$70,042
38	40	22	Ward Burton	Bill Davis Racing	Dodge	184	0	engine	49	$68,040
39	7	8	Dale Earnhardt Jr.	Dale Earnhardt, Inc.	Chevrolet	171	4	engine	51	$69,593
40	39	21	Elliott Sadler	Wood Brothers Racing	Ford	156	0	running	43	$52,835
41	18	2	Rusty Wallace	Penske Racing South	Ford	118	0	running	40	$79,940
42	30	66	Todd Bodine	Haas-Carter Motorsports	Ford	38	0	crash	37	$34,760
43	11	97	Kurt Busch (R)	Roush Racing	Ford	16	0	crash	34	$42,069
Official race results

Previous race: 2001 MBNA Platinum 400	NASCAR Winston Cup Series; 2001 season	Next race: 2001 Pocono 500
