= 2001 Dodge/Save Mart 350 =

16th race of the 2001 NASCAR Winston Cup Series

Race details
- Race 16 of 36 in the 2001 NASCAR Winston Cup Series
- The 2001 Dodge/Save Mart 350 program cover.
- Date: June 24, 2001
- Official name: 13th Annual Dodge/Save Mart 350
- Location: Sonoma, California, Sears Point Raceway
- Course: Permanent racing facility
- Course length: 2 miles (3.2 km)
- Distance: 112 laps, 224 mi (360.493 km)
- Scheduled distance: 112 laps, 224 mi (360.493 km)
- Average speed: 75.889 miles per hour (122.132 km/h)

Pole position
Driver	Jeff Gordon	Hendrick Motorsports
- Time: 1:16.841

Most laps led
Driver	Jeff Gordon	Hendrick Motorsports
- Laps: 55

Winner
No. 20	Tony Stewart	Joe Gibbs Racing

Television in the United States
- Network: FOX
- Announcers: Mike Joy, Larry McReynolds, Darrell Waltrip

Radio in the United States
- Radio: Performance Racing Network

The 2001 Dodge/Save Mart 350 was the 16th stock car race of the 2001 NASCAR Winston Cup Series and the 13th iteration of the event. The race was held on Sunday, June 24, 2001, in Sonoma, California, at the club layout in Sears Point Raceway, a 2 miles (3.2 km) permanent road course layout. The race took the scheduled 112 laps to complete. In the final stages of the race, Tony Stewart, driving for Joe Gibbs Racing, would take an advantage of an angry Robby Gordon, who was focused on lapping Kevin Harvick, and slip by to win his 11th career NASCAR Winston Cup Series win and his second of the season. Robby Gordon, who was driving for Ultra Motorsports, would earn a second-place finish. To fill out the podium, Jeff Gordon, driving for Hendrick Motorsports, would finish third.

== Background ==
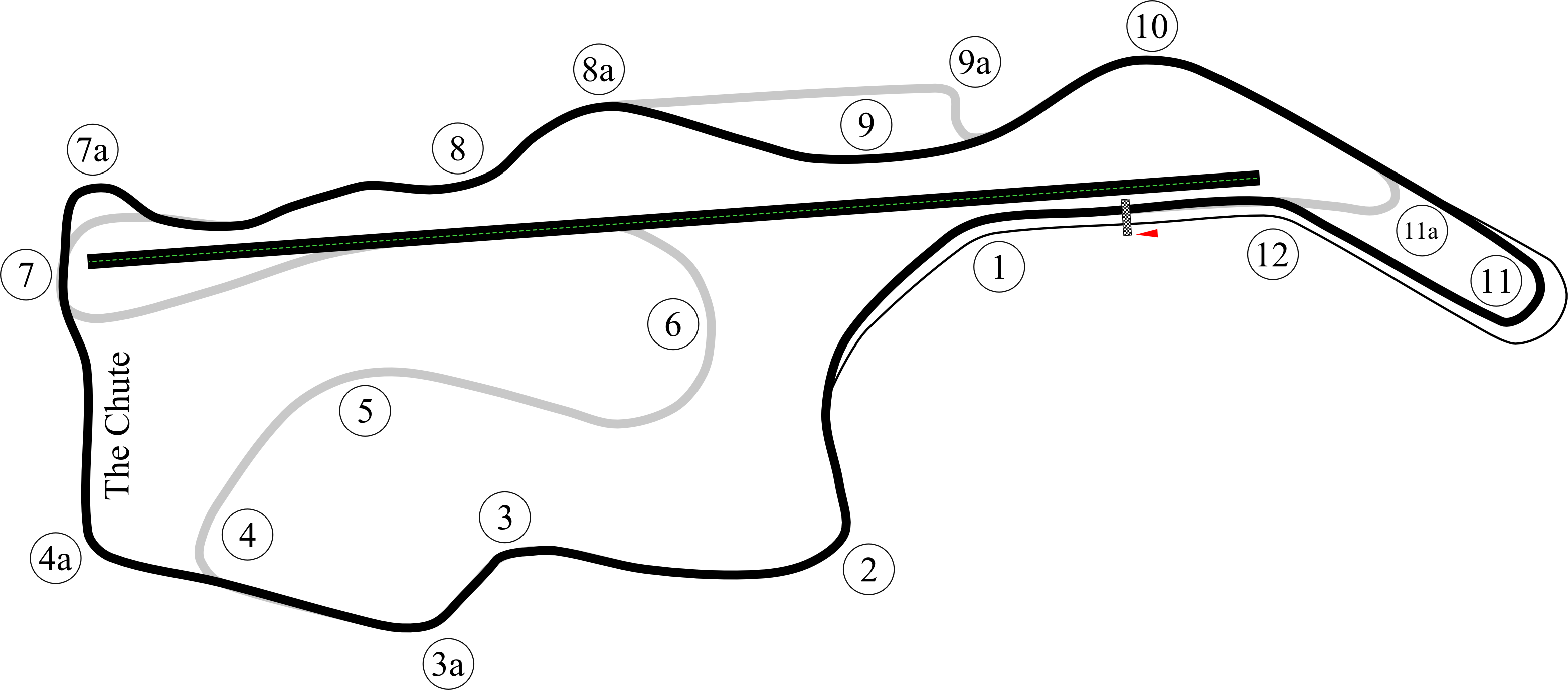
The layout of Sears Point Raceway used by NASCAR at the time.

Sears Point Raceway is one of two road courses to hold NASCAR races, the other being Watkins Glen International Raceway. The standard road course at Infineon Raceway is a 12-turn course that is 2.52 miles (4.06 km) long; the track was modified in 1998, adding the Chute, which bypassed turns 5 and 6, shortening the course to 1.95 miles (3.14 km). The Chute was only used for NASCAR events such as this race, and was criticized by many drivers, who preferred the full layout. In 2001, it was replaced with a 70-degree turn, 4A, bringing the track to its current dimensions of 1.99 miles (3.20 km).

=== Entry list ===
- (R) denotes rookie driver.

#	Driver	Team	Make
1	Steve Park	Dale Earnhardt, Inc.	Chevrolet
01	Dorsey Schroeder	Chip Ganassi Racing with Felix Sabates	Dodge
2	Rusty Wallace	Penske Racing South	Ford
4	Kevin Lepage	Morgan–McClure Motorsports	Chevrolet
04	Jason Leffler (R)	Chip Ganassi Racing with Felix Sabates	Dodge
5	Terry Labonte	Hendrick Motorsports	Chevrolet
6	Mark Martin	Roush Racing	Ford
7	Robby Gordon	Ultra Motorsports	Ford
8	Dale Earnhardt Jr.	Dale Earnhardt, Inc.	Chevrolet
9	Bill Elliott	Evernham Motorsports	Dodge
10	Johnny Benson Jr.	MBV Motorsports	Pontiac
11	Brett Bodine	Brett Bodine Racing	Ford
12	Jeremy Mayfield	Penske Racing South	Ford
14	Ron Hornaday Jr. (R)	A. J. Foyt Enterprises	Pontiac
15	Michael Waltrip	Dale Earnhardt, Inc.	Chevrolet
17	Matt Kenseth	Roush Racing	Ford
18	Bobby Labonte	Joe Gibbs Racing	Pontiac
19	Casey Atwood (R)	Evernham Motorsports	Dodge
20	Tony Stewart	Joe Gibbs Racing	Pontiac
21	Elliott Sadler	Wood Brothers Racing	Ford
22	Ward Burton	Bill Davis Racing	Dodge
24	Jeff Gordon	Hendrick Motorsports	Chevrolet
25	Jerry Nadeau	Hendrick Motorsports	Chevrolet
26	Jimmy Spencer	Haas-Carter Motorsports	Ford
27	Kenny Wallace	Eel River Racing	Pontiac
28	Ricky Rudd	Robert Yates Racing	Ford
29	Kevin Harvick (R)	Richard Childress Racing	Chevrolet
31	Mike Skinner	Richard Childress Racing	Chevrolet
32	Ricky Craven	PPI Motorsports	Ford
33	Scott Pruett	Andy Petree Racing	Chevrolet
36	Ken Schrader	MBV Motorsports	Pontiac
40	Sterling Marlin	Chip Ganassi Racing with Felix Sabates	Dodge
43	John Andretti	Petty Enterprises	Dodge
44	Buckshot Jones	Petty Enterprises	Dodge
45	Kyle Petty	Petty Enterprises	Dodge
55	Bobby Hamilton	Andy Petree Racing	Chevrolet
66	Todd Bodine	Haas-Carter Motorsports	Ford
68	Anthony Lazzaro	TWC Motorsports	Chevrolet
77	Boris Said	Jasper Motorsports	Ford
87	Ron Fellows	NEMCO Motorsports	Chevrolet
88	Dale Jarrett	Robert Yates Racing	Ford
90	Brian Simo	Donlavey Racing	Ford
92	Stacy Compton	Melling Racing	Dodge
93	Dave Blaney	Bill Davis Racing	Dodge
96	Andy Houston (R)	PPI Motorsports	Ford
97	Kurt Busch (R)	Roush Racing	Ford
99	Jeff Burton	Roush Racing	Ford
Official entry list

== Practice ==
=== First practice ===
The first practice session was held on Friday, June 22, at 10:30 AM PST. The session would last for two hours and 30 minutes. Jeff Gordon, driving for Hendrick Motorsports, would set the fastest time in the session, with a lap of 1:16.648 and an average speed of 93.936 mph (151.175 km/h).

Pos.	#	Driver	Team	Make	Time	Speed
1	24	Jeff Gordon	Hendrick Motorsports	Chevrolet	1:16.648	93.936
2	2	Rusty Wallace	Penske Racing South	Ford	1:17.066	93.426
3	87	Ron Fellows	NEMCO Motorsports	Chevrolet	1:17.081	93.408
Full first practice results

=== Second practice ===
The second practice session was held on Saturday, June 23, at 9:30 AM PST. The session would last for one hour and 30 minutes. Ron Fellows, driving for NEMCO Motorsports, would set the fastest time in the session, with a lap of 1:17.421 and an average speed of 92.998 mph (149.666 km/h).

Pos.	#	Driver	Team	Make	Time	Speed
1	87	Ron Fellows	NEMCO Motorsports	Chevrolet	1:17.421	92.998
2	24	Jeff Gordon	Hendrick Motorsports	Chevrolet	1:17.665	92.706
3	7	Robby Gordon	Ultra Motorsports	Ford	1:17.685	92.682
Full second practice results

=== Final practice ===
The final practice session was held on Saturday, June 23, after the preliminary NASCAR Featherlite Southwest Series race. Jeff Gordon, driving for Hendrick Motorsports, would set the fastest time in the session, with a lap of 1:17.124 and an average speed of 93.356 mph (150.242 km/h).

Pos.	#	Driver	Team	Make	Time	Speed
1	24	Jeff Gordon	Hendrick Motorsports	Chevrolet	1:17.124	93.356
2	87	Ron Fellows	NEMCO Motorsports	Chevrolet	1:17.348	93.086
3	2	Rusty Wallace	Penske Racing South	Ford	1:17.609	92.773
Full final practice results

== Qualifying ==
Qualifying was held on Friday, June 22, at 2:00 PM PST. Drivers would each have one lap to set a lap time. Positions 1-36 would be decided on time, while positions 37-43 would be based on provisionals. Six spots are awarded by the use of provisionals based on owner's points. The seventh is awarded to a past champion who has not otherwise qualified for the race. If no past champ needs the provisional, the next team in the owner points will be awarded a provisional.

Jeff Gordon, driving for Hendrick Motorsports, would win the pole, setting a time of 1:16.842 and an average speed of 93.699 mph (150.794 km/h).

Four drivers would fail to qualify: Andy Houston, Kenny Wallace, Anthony Lazzaro, and Jason Leffler.

=== Full qualifying results ===
Pos.	#	Driver	Team	Make	Time	Speed
1	24	Jeff Gordon	Hendrick Motorsports	Chevrolet	1:16.842	93.699
2	2	Rusty Wallace	Penske Racing South	Ford	1:17.074	93.417
3	20	Tony Stewart	Joe Gibbs Racing	Pontiac	1:17.387	93.039
4	18	Bobby Labonte	Joe Gibbs Racing	Pontiac	1:17.511	92.890
5	22	Ward Burton	Bill Davis Racing	Dodge	1:17.605	92.777
6	25	Jerry Nadeau	Hendrick Motorsports	Chevrolet	1:17.681	92.687
7	7	Robby Gordon	Ultra Motorsports	Ford	1:17.756	92.597
8	5	Terry Labonte	Hendrick Motorsports	Chevrolet	1:17.801	92.544
9	32	Ricky Craven	PPI Motorsports	Ford	1:17.836	92.502
10	55	Bobby Hamilton	Andy Petree Racing	Chevrolet	1:17.932	92.388
11	33	Scott Pruett	Andy Petree Racing	Chevrolet	1:17.987	92.323
12	29	Kevin Harvick (R)	Richard Childress Racing	Chevrolet	1:18.011	92.295
13	87	Ron Fellows	NEMCO Motorsports	Chevrolet	1:18.022	92.282
14	10	Johnny Benson Jr.	MBV Motorsports	Pontiac	1:18.026	92.277
15	90	Brian Simo	Donlavey Racing	Ford	1:18.062	92.234
16	40	Sterling Marlin	Chip Ganassi Racing with Felix Sabates	Dodge	1:18.071	92.224
17	93	Dave Blaney	Bill Davis Racing	Dodge	1:18.115	92.172
18	9	Bill Elliott	Evernham Motorsports	Dodge	1:18.120	92.166
19	15	Michael Waltrip	Dale Earnhardt, Inc.	Chevrolet	1:18.193	92.080
20	17	Matt Kenseth	Roush Racing	Ford	1:18.205	92.066
21	43	John Andretti	Petty Enterprises	Dodge	1:18.207	92.063
22	28	Ricky Rudd	Robert Yates Racing	Ford	1:18.270	91.989
23	66	Todd Bodine	Haas-Carter Motorsports	Ford	1:18.542	91.671
24	31	Mike Skinner	Richard Childress Racing	Chevrolet	1:18.549	91.662
25	11	Brett Bodine	Brett Bodine Racing	Ford	1:18.560	91.650
26	99	Jeff Burton	Roush Racing	Ford	1:18.572	91.636
27	21	Elliott Sadler	Wood Brothers Racing	Ford	1:18.631	91.567
28	19	Casey Atwood (R)	Evernham Motorsports	Dodge	1:18.653	91.541
29	44	Buckshot Jones	Petty Enterprises	Dodge	1:18.654	91.540
30	92	Stacy Compton	Melling Racing	Dodge	1:18.775	91.400
31	4	Kevin Lepage	Morgan–McClure Motorsports	Chevrolet	1:18.824	91.343
32	36	Ken Schrader	MB2 Motorsports	Pontiac	1:18.903	91.251
33	45	Kyle Petty	Petty Enterprises	Dodge	1:19.019	91.117
34	1	Steve Park	Dale Earnhardt, Inc.	Chevrolet	1:19.137	90.981
35	88	Dale Jarrett	Robert Yates Racing	Ford	1:19.161	90.954
36	01	Dorsey Schroeder	Chip Ganassi Racing with Felix Sabates	Dodge	1:19.210	90.898
Provisionals
37	8	Dale Earnhardt Jr.	Dale Earnhardt, Inc.	Chevrolet	1:19.261	90.839
38	6	Mark Martin	Roush Racing	Ford	1:21.611	88.223
39	26	Jimmy Spencer	Haas-Carter Motorsports	Ford	-	-
40	12	Jeremy Mayfield	Penske Racing South	Ford	1:20.478	89.465
41	97	Kurt Busch (R)	Roush Racing	Ford	1:35.671	75.258
42	77	Boris Said	Jasper Motorsports	Ford	1:19.947	90.060
43	14	Ron Hornaday Jr. (R)	A. J. Foyt Enterprises	Pontiac	1:19.416	90.662
Failed to qualify
44	96	Andy Houston (R)	PPI Motorsports	Ford	1:19.670	90.373
45	27	Kenny Wallace	Eel River Racing	Pontiac	1:19.855	90.163
46	68	Anthony Lazzaro	TWC Motorsports	Chevrolet	1:19.953	90.053
47	04	Jason Leffler (R)	Chip Ganassi Racing with Felix Sabates	Dodge	1:22.285	87.501
Official qualifying results

== Race results ==
Fin	St	#	Driver	Team	Make	Laps	Led	Status	Pts	Winnings
1	3	20	Tony Stewart	Joe Gibbs Racing	Pontiac	112	11	running	180	$139,875
2	7	7	Robby Gordon	Ultra Motorsports	Ford	112	20	running	175	$114,035
3	1	24	Jeff Gordon	Hendrick Motorsports	Chevrolet	112	55	running	175	$129,277
4	22	28	Ricky Rudd	Robert Yates Racing	Ford	112	0	running	160	$98,847
5	2	2	Rusty Wallace	Penske Racing South	Ford	112	0	running	155	$94,780
6	5	22	Ward Burton	Bill Davis Racing	Dodge	112	0	running	150	$88,975
7	4	18	Bobby Labonte	Joe Gibbs Racing	Pontiac	112	0	running	146	$106,267
8	26	99	Jeff Burton	Roush Racing	Ford	112	0	running	142	$93,186
9	18	9	Bill Elliott	Evernham Motorsports	Dodge	112	0	running	138	$74,713
10	38	6	Mark Martin	Roush Racing	Ford	112	0	running	134	$96,036
11	42	77	Boris Said	Jasper Motorsports	Ford	112	0	running	130	$64,695
12	11	33	Scott Pruett	Andy Petree Racing	Chevrolet	112	0	running	127	$77,020
13	25	11	Brett Bodine	Brett Bodine Racing	Ford	112	1	running	129	$53,811
14	12	29	Kevin Harvick (R)	Richard Childress Racing	Chevrolet	112	0	running	121	$89,877
15	10	55	Bobby Hamilton	Andy Petree Racing	Chevrolet	112	0	running	118	$56,850
16	9	32	Ricky Craven	PPI Motorsports	Ford	112	0	running	115	$46,300
17	27	21	Elliott Sadler	Wood Brothers Racing	Ford	112	3	running	117	$67,865
18	43	14	Ron Hornaday Jr. (R)	A. J. Foyt Enterprises	Pontiac	112	0	running	109	$44,850
19	37	8	Dale Earnhardt Jr.	Dale Earnhardt, Inc.	Chevrolet	112	0	running	106	$75,718
20	19	15	Michael Waltrip	Dale Earnhardt, Inc.	Chevrolet	112	1	running	108	$54,560
21	20	17	Matt Kenseth	Roush Racing	Ford	112	0	running	100	$53,200
22	33	45	Kyle Petty	Petty Enterprises	Dodge	112	0	running	97	$40,840
23	41	97	Kurt Busch (R)	Roush Racing	Ford	112	0	running	94	$52,205
24	30	92	Stacy Compton	Melling Racing	Dodge	112	0	running	91	$47,100
25	36	01	Dorsey Schroeder	Chip Ganassi Racing with Felix Sabates	Dodge	112	0	running	88	$52,805
26	35	88	Dale Jarrett	Robert Yates Racing	Ford	112	0	running	85	$85,702
27	39	26	Jimmy Spencer	Haas-Carter Motorsports	Ford	112	1	running	87	$51,740
28	16	40	Sterling Marlin	Chip Ganassi Racing with Felix Sabates	Dodge	112	0	running	79	$51,555
29	14	10	Johnny Benson Jr.	MBV Motorsports	Pontiac	112	0	running	76	$51,535
30	21	43	John Andretti	Petty Enterprises	Dodge	111	0	crash	73	$78,522
31	6	25	Jerry Nadeau	Hendrick Motorsports	Chevrolet	111	0	running	70	$48,425
32	17	93	Dave Blaney	Bill Davis Racing	Dodge	111	0	running	67	$40,365
33	23	66	Todd Bodine	Haas-Carter Motorsports	Ford	111	0	running	64	$40,340
34	24	31	Mike Skinner	Richard Childress Racing	Chevrolet	111	0	running	61	$72,624
35	29	44	Buckshot Jones	Petty Enterprises	Dodge	111	0	running	58	78,280
36	8	5	Terry Labonte	Hendrick Motorsports	Chevrolet	110	0	crash	55	$72,990
37	32	36	Ken Schrader	MB2 Motorsports	Pontiac	104	0	running	52	$48,240
38	13	87	Ron Fellows	NEMCO Motorsports	Chevrolet	101	20	crash	54	$40,195
39	40	12	Jeremy Mayfield	Penske Racing South	Ford	97	0	running	46	$79,459
40	34	1	Steve Park	Dale Earnhardt, Inc.	Chevrolet	93	0	running	43	$66,373
41	28	19	Casey Atwood (R)	Evernham Motorsports	Dodge	41	0	engine	40	$40,110
42	15	90	Brian Simo	Donlavey Racing	Ford	30	0	transmission	37	$40,090
43	31	4	Kevin Lepage	Morgan–McClure Motorsports	Chevrolet	2	0	engine	34	$40,317
Official race results

Previous race: 2001 Pocono 500	NASCAR Winston Cup Series; 2001 season	Next race: 2001 Pepsi 400
