= 2001 Coca-Cola 600 =

Race details
- Race 12 of 36 in the 2001 NASCAR Winston Cup Series
- Layout of Lowe's Motor Speedway
- Date: May 27, 2001
- Location: Lowe's Motor Speedway, Concord, North Carolina
- Course: Permanent racing facility
- Course length: 1.5 miles (2.4 km)
- Distance: 400 laps, 600 mi (965.606 km)
- Weather: Temperatures ranging from 51.1 °F (10.6 °C) and 67.4 °F (19.7 °C); wind speeds approaching 12.7 miles per hour (20.4 km/h)
- Average speed: 138.107 mph (222.262 km/h)

Pole position
Driver	Ryan Newman	Penske Racing

Most laps led
Driver	Jeff Burton	Roush Racing
- Laps: 125

Winner
No. 99	Jeff Burton	Roush Racing

Television in the United States
- Network: Fox
- Announcers: Mike Joy, Darrell Waltrip, Larry McReynolds

The 2001 Coca-Cola 600, the 42nd running of the event, was a NASCAR Winston Cup Series race held on May 27, 2001, at Lowe's Motor Speedway in Charlotte, North Carolina. Contested at 400 laps on the 1.5 miles (2.4 km) speedway, it was the twelfth race of the 2001 NASCAR Winston Cup Series season. Jeff Burton of Roush Racing won the race.

== Background ==
Lowe's Motor Speedway, the track where the race was held.

Lowe's Motor Speedway is a motorsports complex located in Concord, North Carolina. The complex features a 1.5 miles (2.4 km) quad oval track that hosts NASCAR racing including the prestigious Coca-Cola 600 on Memorial Day weekend and The Winston, as well as the UAW-GM Quality 500. The speedway was built in 1959 by Bruton Smith and is considered the home track for NASCAR with many race teams located in the Charlotte area. The track is owned and operated by Speedway Motorsports (SMI) with Humpy Wheeler as track president.

== Summary ==
Tony Stewart successfully performed the "Double Duty", also running the Indianapolis 500 the same day; Joe Gibbs Racing had Mike McLaughlin on standby if he did not arrive on time. After finishing sixth at Indy, Stewart arrived less than half an hour before the start of the race. If Stewart did not arrive for the start of the Coca-Cola 600, McLaughlin would have been given credit for the start under NASCAR rules. He had to start at the end of the field (43rd place) due to missing the mandatory drivers' meeting that is held two hours before any race. Stewart eventually finished this race in third. This was his second Double Duty after 1999, where he finished ninth at Indy and fourth at Charlotte.

Jeff Burton won the race driving for Roush Racing as the team became the first to win three races in a row.

Failed to qualify: John Andretti (No. 43), Kyle Petty (No. 45), Derrike Cope (No. 37), Mike Wallace (No. 7), Jeff Fultz (No. 54), Carl Long (No. 85)

=== Top 10 results ===
Pos	Grid	No.	Driver	Team	Manufacturer	Laps	Points
1	18	99	Jeff Burton	Roush Racing	Ford	400	185
2	6	29	Kevin Harvick	Richard Childress Racing	Chevrolet	400	175
3	12	20	Tony Stewart	Joe Gibbs Racing	Pontiac	400	165
4	10	6	Mark Martin	Roush Racing	Ford	400	165
5	24	18	Bobby Labonte	Joe Gibbs Racing	Pontiac	400	160
6	5	26	Jimmy Spencer	Haas-Carter Motorsports	Ford	400	155
7	21	28	Ricky Rudd	Robert Yates Racing	Ford	400	146
8	37	88	Dale Jarrett	Robert Yates Racing	Ford	400	142
9	9	22	Ward Burton	Bill Davis Racing	Dodge	400	143
10	34	12	Jeremy Mayfield	Penske Racing	Ford	400	134

=== Race statistics ===
- Time of race: 4:20:40
- Average Speed: 138.107 miles per hour (222.262 km/h)
- Pole Speed: 185.217
- Cautions: 6 for 45 laps
- Margin of Victory: 3.19 sec
- Lead changes: 28
- Percent of race run under caution: 11.2%
- Average green flag run: 50.7 laps

Previous race: 2001 Pontiac Excitement 400	Winston Cup Series; 2001 season	Next race: 2001 MBNA Platinum 400
