= Myrtle Beach Speedway =

Motorsport track in the United States

- D-oval (1958–2020)
- Location: Myrtle Beach, South Carolina
- Coordinates: 33°44′47″N 78°57′07″W
- Capacity: 12,000 (Oval)
- Opened: 1958
- Closed: August 2020; 6 years ago
- Former names: Rambi Raceway (1958–1974)
- Major events: NASCAR Whelen All-American Series; IceBreaker 125 (2016–2020); Myrtle Beach 400 (1993–2019); NASCAR Busch Series; Myrtle Beach 250 (1988–2000); NASCAR Whelen Modified Tour (2017–2019); CARS Tour (1998–2009, 2011–2016, 2018); NASCAR Whelen Southern Modified Tour (1989–1996, 1998–2001, 2003–2004, 2009); NASCAR Southeast Series (1991–1999, 2001–2004); NASCAR Grand National East Series (1972); NASCAR Grand National Series (1958–1965); NASCAR Convertible Series (1958)

Paved D-oval (1974–2020)
- Surface: Asphalt
- Length: 0.538 mi (0.866 km)
- Turns: 4
- Banking: Turns: 13° Straights: 4° front, 3° back

Original D-oval (1958–1973)
- Surface: Dirt
- Length: 0.538 mi (0.866 km)
- Turns: 4

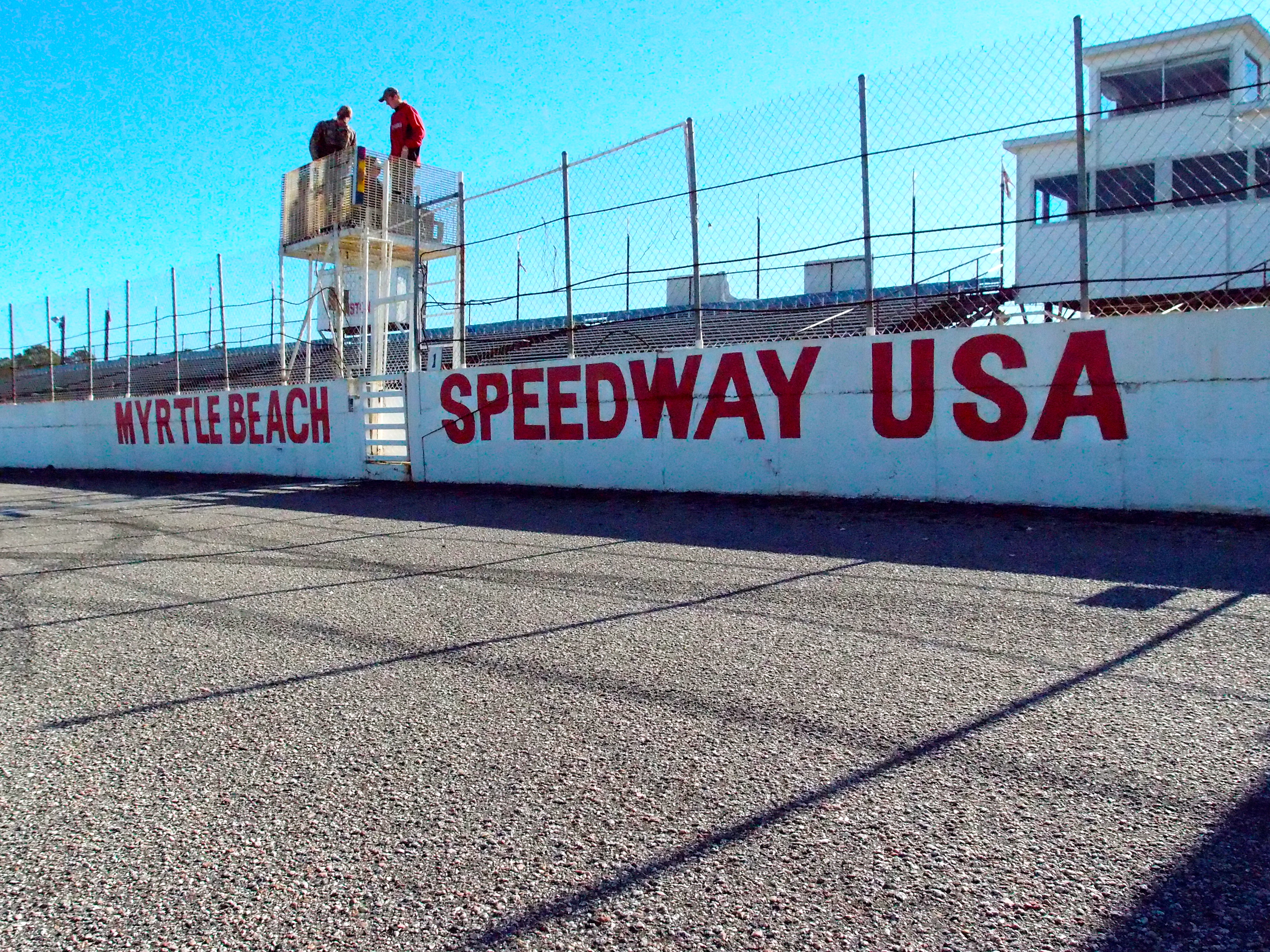
Myrtle Beach Speedway

Myrtle Beach Speedway (originally named Rambi Raceway) was a short track located on U.S. Route 501 near Myrtle Beach, South Carolina. The track was built in 1958.

The speedway was a semi-banked asphalt oval track that spans 0.538 miles (0.866 km).The NASCAR Cup Series competed at the Speedway from 1958 through 1965. The NASCAR Busch Series raced at Myrtle Beach Speedway from 1988 to 2000.

Over the years, Myrtle Beach Speedway has been the training grounds for some of NASCAR's biggest stars including Jeff Gordon (former Busch Series track record holder). All four generations of Pettys (Lee, Richard, Kyle, and Adam) and three generations of Earnhardts (Ralph, Dale, Dale Jr., and Kelley) have taken a green flag around the asphalt oval that spans 0.538 miles (0.866 km).

== History ==
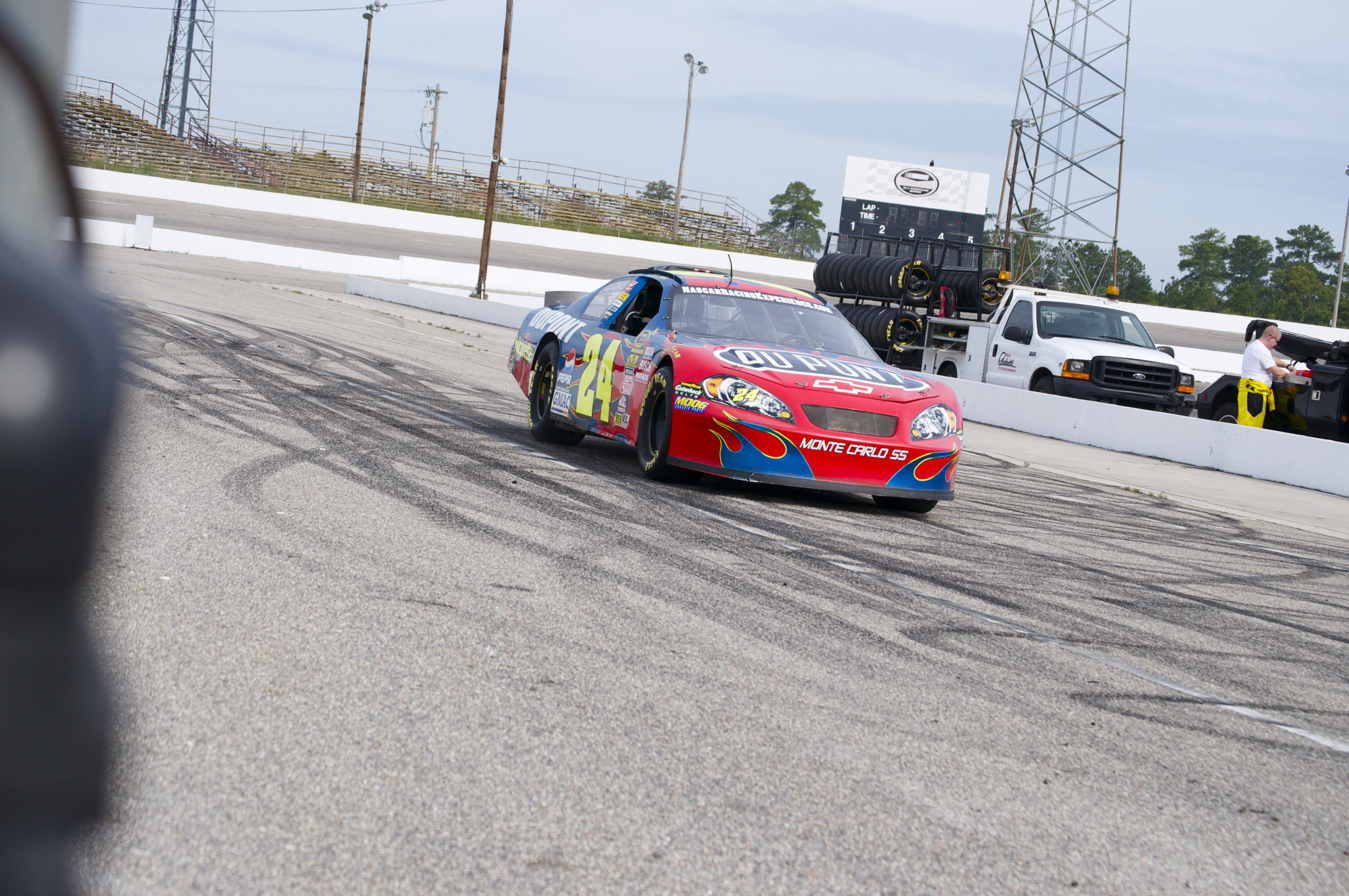
A Late Model car belonging to The NASCAR Racing Experience

Rambi Raceway opened as a dirt track in 1958.

The track hosted one NASCAR Convertible Series event in 1958 and one NASCAR Grand National East Series race in 1972.

Nick Lucas bought the track in 1968, paving it in 1974. Billy Hardee became a co-owner in 1987.

NASCAR Southeast Series had run 17 races at the facility between 1991 and 2004, with the Myrtle Beach 400 Late Model race (originally an All Pro event) beginning in 1993. Originally a 400-lap touring race, the race settled to NASCAR-specification Late Models of 250 laps with heat races and support races combined for 400 laps, originally set for Thanksgiving weekend, but later moved to the week before Thanksgiving in order to allow competitors to participate in the NASCAR Late Model Thanksgiving Classic at Southern National Motorsports Park in Lucama, North Carolina.

The NASCAR Busch Series race (the Myrtle Beach 250) in 2000 was the last major NASCAR event at the track.

The NASCAR Local Racing Series raced on Saturday nights from late February through November. The track also ran various other classes of racing including Late Model Charger, Super Trucks and Mini Stocks. The speedway was home of the Myrtle Beach 400, IceBreaker 200, NASCAR Racing Experience, Monster Jam, NOPI Nationals and Horry County Fair with recent additions of Wheels of Destruction Thrill Show and the Myrtle Beach BikeFest.

In a deal that closed April 2012, Speedway Group Inc. bought the facility, including 48 acres. Robert J. Lutz, one of the new owners, said Lt. Gov. André Bauer arranged for the deal to take place. Bauer said he wanted the track to help improve Myrtle Beach's economy with new events. Upgrades to the track were planned, and plans called for the NASCAR Racing Experience to attract drivers and tourists. One goal was another top-level race.

The NASCAR Whelen Southern Modified Tour had one race at the speedway in 2009. After merging the two NASCAR Whelen Modified Tours at the end of the 2016 season, beginning in 2017, the newly unified tour hosted three events at the track from 2017 through 2019.

CARS X-1R Pro Cup Series had 24 races at Myrtle Beach between 1998 and 2014. CARS Super Late Model Tour and CARS Late Model Stock Tour had 3 events each at the facility, between 2015 and 2018.

In 2016, Myrtle Beach Speedway began opening the season in February with the Late Models in the IceBreaker.

In May 2020, it was announced the track would close its doors for good in August, before the season could be finished as the result of a sale to a land developer. Meanwhile, track promoter Steve Zacharias worked immediately to preserve Myrtle Beach's major races and upon the track's closure, worked to finish the 2020 racing season.

The final race at Myrtle Beach Speedway, the Sun Fun 101, was held in August 2020. Sam Yarbrough won the final Late Model race while Carmen Odum and Carsyn Gillikin won their respective races in the final feature race ever held at the track. Promoter Steve Zacharias announced the Myrtle Beach season would continue at Florence Motor Speedway in Timmonsville, which Zacharias would take over promotion of the track. That allowed Myrtle Beach's major race weekends to continue in the 2020 season in the Florence-Myrtle Beach metropolitan area.

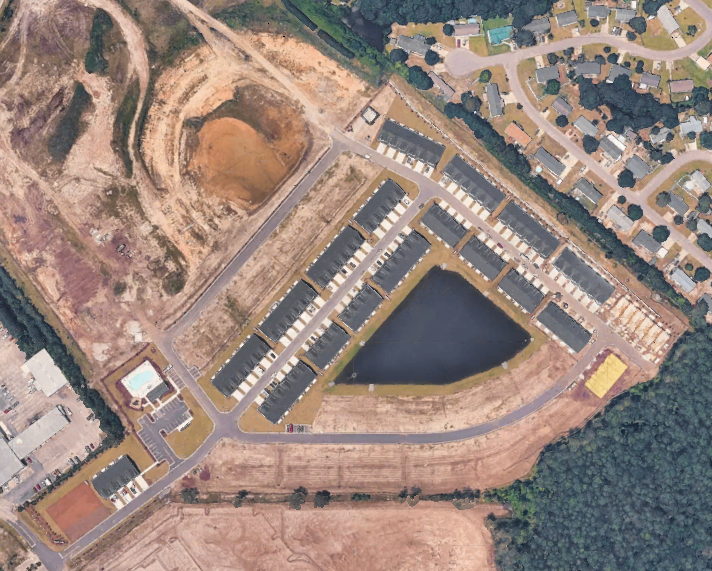
Myrtle Beach Speedway as of December 2024

Originally, the land owners' plan was to demolish the facility and build hotels and condos on the property, but it was announced in early July 2021 that the company will not use the land for the original purpose, and the concept for the area fell through. Although it kept the track safe from demolition for the time being, photos taken on July 6, 2021 showed weeds and grass slowly taking over the racetrack. In December 2021, most of the track, including the track itself, most of the outside walls, and pit road were demolished, as now all that remains (as of December 22, 2024), is the dirt of what was once turns 3 and 4. while a new resident pond was built alongside tons of houses.

== Charlie Powell 400 Winners ==
The Myrtle Beach 400 was originally a NASCAR All Pro / Southeast Series Late Model event from 1993 to 1995 before becoming a NASCAR-spec Late Model division race in 1996 where any NASCAR Local Racing Series track that runs a NASCAR Late Model class car can participate (primarily in the Carolinas and Virginia, perimeter chassis; cars used in this race are the same ones that are used at the ValleyStar Credit Union 300 in Martinsville Speedway, not to be confused with offset chassis Super Late Models). Originally a 400-lap All Pro race, the race has become 250 laps Late Model with other weekly features combining for the 400 laps. The race was not held in 2012 because of weather, after which there were two features in 2013, one to start the season and one to end the season.

Following the closure of Myrtle Beach Speedway, the race moved to Florence Motor Speedway for the 2020 season.

| Year | Driver |
|---|---|
| 1993 | Jody Ridley |
| 1994 | Gary St. Amant |
| 1995 | Freddie Query |
| 1996 | Jay Fogleman |
| 1997 | David Blankenship |
| 1998 | Stephen Grimes |
| 1999 | Scott Riggs |
| 2000 | Greg Edwards |
| 2001 | Robert Powell |
| 2002 | Robert Powell |
| 2003 | Timothy Peters |
| 2004 | Frank Deiny Jnr |
| 2005 | Frank Deiny Jnr |
| 2006 | Frank Deiny Jnr |
| 2007 | Sam Yarbrough |
| 2008 | Jamey Caudill |
| 2009 | Lucas Ransone |
| 2010 | Frank Deiny Jnr |
| 2011 | Garrett Campbell |
| 2013 | Anthony Anders (March) |
| 2013 | Lee Pulliam (November) |
| 2014 | Travis Swaim |
| 2015 | Myatt Snider |
| 2016 | Christian Eckes |
| 2017 | Josh Berry |
| 2018 | Chad McCumbee |
| 2019 | Will Burns |
| 2020 | Ty Majeski |
| 2021 | Ty Majeski |
| 2022 | Brenden Queen |
| 2023 | Kade Brown |
| 2024 | (Canada) Treyten Lapcevich |
| 2025 | Caden Kvapil |
