= 2010 Brickyard 400 =

Race details
- Race 20 of 36 in the 2010 NASCAR Sprint Cup Series
- 2010 Brickyard 400 program cover
- Date: July 25, 2010
- Location: Indianapolis Motor Speedway, Speedway, Indiana
- Course: Permanent racing facility
- Course length: 2.500 miles (4.023 km)
- Distance: 160 laps, 400 mi (643.73 km)
- Weather: Temperatures up to 93 °F (34 °C); wind speeds up to 16.9 miles per hour (27.2 km/h)

Pole position
Driver	Juan Pablo Montoya	Earnhardt Ganassi Racing
- Time: 49.375

Most laps led
Driver	Juan Pablo Montoya	Earnhardt Ganassi Racing
- Laps: 86

Winner
No. 1	Jamie McMurray	Earnhardt Ganassi Racing

Television in the United States
- Network: ESPN
- Announcers: Marty Reid, Dale Jarrett and Andy Petree

The 2010 Brickyard 400, the 17th running of the event, was a NASCAR Sprint Cup Series race held on July 25, 2010, at Indianapolis Motor Speedway in Speedway, Indiana. Contested over 160 laps, it was the twentieth race of the 2010 NASCAR Sprint Cup season. The race was won by Jamie McMurray, for the Earnhardt Ganassi Racing team. Kevin Harvick finished second, and Greg Biffle, who started seventh, clinched third.

There were seven cautions and fourteen lead changes among ten different drivers throughout the course of the race, McMurray's second win of the season and his first ever at Indianapolis. The result moved him up two spots to sixteenth in the Drivers' Championship, 625 points behind of leader Kevin Harvick and five ahead of Kasey Kahne. Chevrolet maintained its lead in the Manufacturers' Championship, twenty points ahead of Toyota and fifty-three ahead of Ford, with twenty races remaining in the season.

== Report ==
=== Background ===
Indianapolis Motor Speedway, the race track where the race was held.

Prior to the race, Richard Childress Racing driver Kevin Harvick led the Drivers' Championship with 2,745 points, and Hendrick Motorsports driver Jeff Gordon was second with 2,642 points. Behind them in the Drivers' Championship, Jimmie Johnson was third with 2,557 points, and Denny Hamlin was fourth with 2,542 points. Kurt Busch was fifth with 2,524 points. In the Manufacturers' Championship, Chevrolet was leading with 134 points, fifteen points ahead of their rival Toyota. In the battle for third place, Dodge had 84 points, three ahead of Ford.

=== Practice and qualifying ===
Four practice sessions were held before the Sunday race—two on Friday and two on Saturday. The practice sessions each lasted 60 minutes. In the first practice session, Juan Pablo Montoya was quickest, ahead of Jimmie Johnson, Max Papis, and Robby Gordon. Bill Elliott was fifth quickest. In the Friday evening practice session, Montoya remained quickest, ahead of Jamie McMurray and Mark Martin in second and third. Clint Bowyer was fourth fastest as Johnson was fifth. In the third practice session, Jeff Burton was quickest, ahead of his teammate Bowyer in second. Kevin Harvick was third quickest, and Kasey Kahne was scored fourth. Matt Kenseth rounded out the top five with a time of 51.425. During the fourth and final practice session for the race, Martin Truex Jr. was quickest, ahead of Burton and Bowyer in the second and third positions. Carl Edwards and Martin followed to round out the top five quickest drivers.

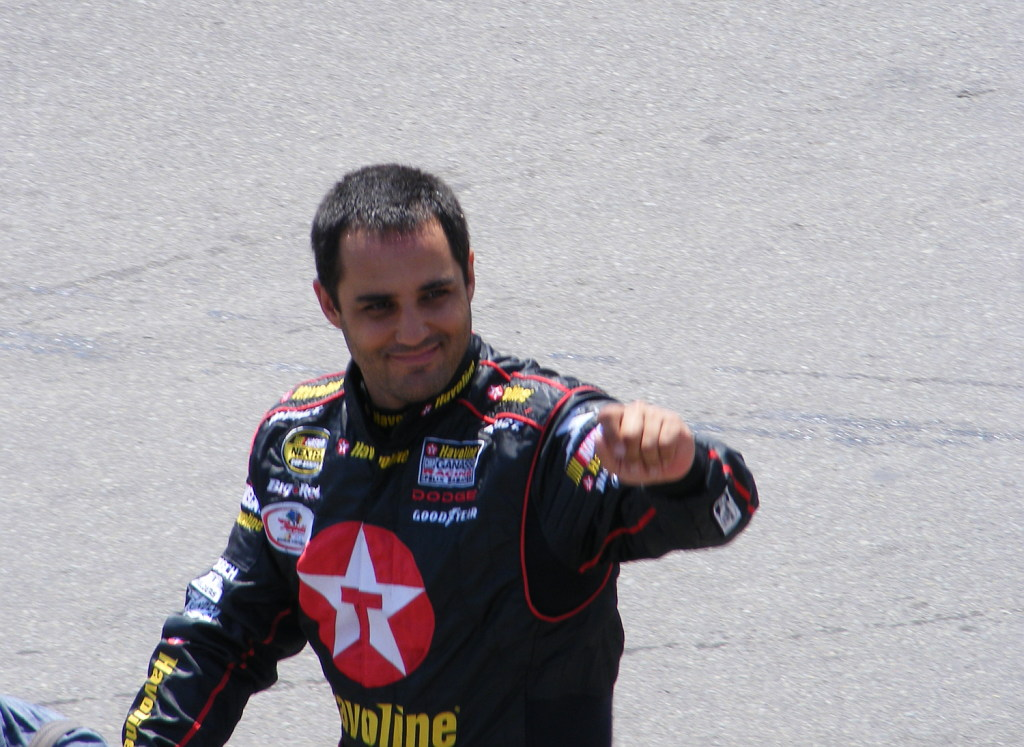
Juan Montoya won the pole position with a time of 49.375.

During qualifying, forty-seven drivers were entered, but only the fastest forty-three raced because of NASCAR's qualifying procedure. Montoya clinched the pole position, with a time of 49.375. He was joined on the front row of the grid by Johnson. Mark Martin only managed to qualify third, and McMurray qualified fourth. Ryan Newman qualified fifth with a time of 49.521. Bowyer, Greg Biffle, Jeff Gordon, Harvick and Burton rounded off the top ten. The four drivers that did not qualify were David Gilliland, Casey Mears, David Stremme, and J. J. Yeley.

=== Race ===
The race, twentieth out of a total of thirty-six in the season, began at 1 p.m. EDT and was televised live in the United States on ESPN. Howard Brammer, of Traders Point Christian Church, began pre-race ceremonies by delivering the invocation. Afterward, Sparrow Records recording artist Steven Curtis Chapman sang the United States National Anthem and Indianapolis Motor Speedway chairman Mari Hulman George gave the command to start engines. Then, Joey Logano and Todd Bodine moved to the rear of the grid during the pace laps because of engine changes. Herb Branham, a NASCAR spokesperson, announced that there would be a competition caution on lap 15.

Juan Pablo Montoya held the lead through the first corner, as Jimmie Johnson followed in the second position. Later on the same lap, a multiple car accident brought out the first caution. While under caution, Elliott Sadler, who was involved in the accident, drove his race car to the garage for repairs, and Sam Hornish Jr. received a stop and go penalty for speeding on pit road. On lap 8, Montoya led the grid to the green flag. Two laps later, Ryan Newman went to pit road because of a flat tire. On lap 12, Carl Edwards, Denny Hamlin, A. J. Allmendinger, and Dale Earnhardt Jr. came to pit lane because of engine overheating issues. Also on the same lap, Newman returned to pit lane because another tire was flat.

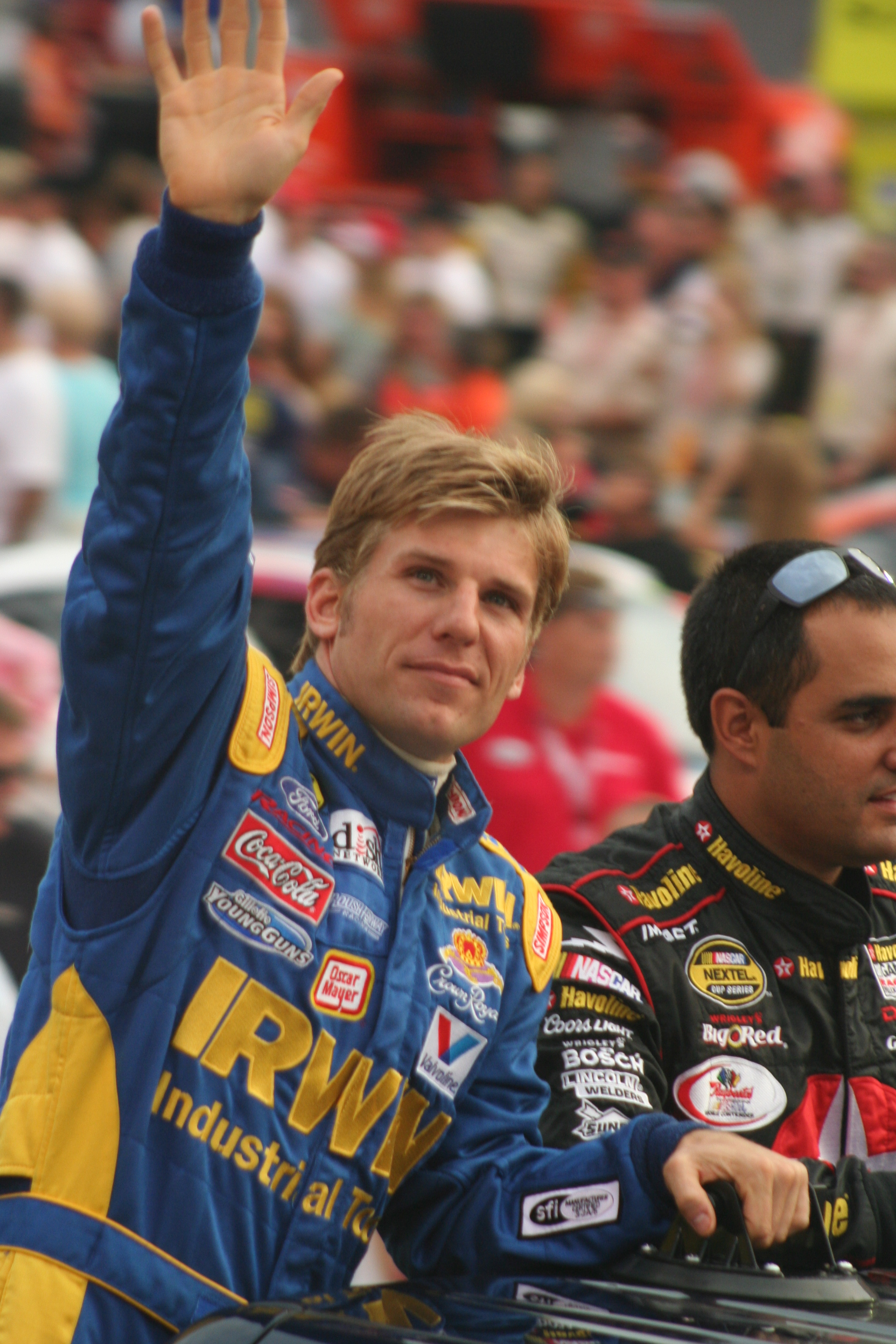
Race winner Jamie McMurray

On lap 16, the second caution came out because Robby Gordon had a tire explode and Max Papis's car was engulfed in flames. On lap 18, Landon Cassill was scored the leader, but before the restart he drove to pit lane for a pit stop. Afterward, Kevin Conway became the leader before giving it to Johnson for the restart because of beating Montoya off pit lane. On lap 22, Montoya became the leader after passing Johnson. Five laps later, Mark Martin passed Johnson for the second position. On lap 31, Greg Biffle moved into the fourth position, after passing his teammate Matt Kenseth. Six laps later, Biffle passed Johnson for the third position. One lap later, because of a loose wheel, Montoya came to pit lane and gave Martin the lead. On lap 47, Johnson fell to fifth, after being passed by Jamie McMurray and Clint Bowyer. One lap later, Johnson lost the fifth position to Kevin Harvick.

On lap 49, Biffle became the leader, as Martin began green flag pit stops. One lap later, Tony Stewart move into the first position after Biffle came to pit lane. After the pit stops ended, Montoya retained the first position. On lap 62, Biffle moved into the lead, after passing Montoya. Four laps later, the third caution came out because of debris on the race surface. Four laps later, the green flag waved with Biffle in the lead. On lap 78, Johnson and Scott Speed collided, all with minor damage except Speed had a tire go flat because of the contact. Ten laps later, Stewart moved into the eleventh position after passing Jeff Gordon. By lap 95, Biffle had a six tenths of a second lead over Montoya. Three laps later, green flag pit stops began. On lap 99, Carl Edwards passed Biffle and Montoya, as they drove to pit road. One lap later, Montoya became the leader. By laps 108, Montoya had a one and a half second lead over the second position. On lap 117, debris caused the fourth caution flag to be waved. All drivers drove to pit road to receive new tires and fuel, but Johnson and his crew were changing shocks.

Montoya led the drivers to the restart on lap 122. After seven laps, Montoya had a two-second lead over his teammate McMurray. Montoya's two-second lead reduced to nothing on lap 138 when the safety car was brought on the track because of the fifth caution. During the pit stops, McMurray's team chose to change two tires, while his teammate Montoya chose to change four tires. On the restart, McMurray led the drivers to the green flag, while Montoya was in the sixth position. Three laps later, on lap 146, the sixth caution came out because Montoya collided with the wall, drove toward pit road, as Dale Earnhardt Jr., collided with him. Also on the same lap, Harvick passed McMurray for the lead. On lap 150, Harvick led the drivers to the green flag, but one lap later McMurray passed him. McMurray continued to lead, and crossed the finish line first to win his second race of the season. Harvick finished second, ahead of Biffle and Bowyer in third and fourth. Stewart clinched the fifth position. McMurray's win gave his owner Chip Ganassi the trifecta, or winning the Daytona 500, Indianapolis 500, and the Brickyard 400 in the same year.

=== Post-race ===
The race result left Kevin Harvick leading the Driver's Championship with 2,920 points. Jeff Gordon was second with 2,736, seventy-six points ahead of Denny Hamlin and seventy-seven ahead of Jimmie Johnson. Kurt Busch was fifth with 2,658 points. In the Manufacturers' Championship, Chevrolet maintained their lead with 143 points. Toyota remained second with 1123 points. Ford followed with 90 points, six ahead of Dodge in fourth.

== Classification ==
=== Qualifying ===
Grid	No.	Driver	Team	Manufacturer	Time	Speed
1	42	Juan Pablo Montoya	Earnhardt Ganassi Racing	Chevrolet	49.375	182.253
2	48	Jimmie Johnson	Hendrick Motorsports	Chevrolet	49.412	182.142
3	5	Mark Martin	Hendrick Motorsports	Chevrolet	49.504	181.803
4	1	Jamie McMurray	Earnhardt Ganassi Racing	Chevrolet	49.519	181.748
5	39	Ryan Newman	Stewart Haas Racing	Chevrolet	49.521	181.741
6	33	Clint Bowyer	Richard Childress Racing	Chevrolet	49.582	181.517
7	16	Greg Biffle	Roush Fenway Racing	Ford	49.627	181.335
8	24	Jeff Gordon	Hendrick Motorsports	Chevrolet	49.655	181.251
9	29	Kevin Harvick	Richard Childress Racing	Chevrolet	49.666	181.210
10	31	Jeff Burton	Richard Childress Racing	Chevrolet	49.681	181.156
11	12	Brad Keselowski	Penske Racing	Dodge	49.756	180.883
12	56	Martin Truex Jr.	Michael Waltrip Racing	Toyota	49.798	180.730
13	17	Matt Kenseth	Roush Fenway Racing	Ford	49.842	180.571
14	2	Kurt Busch	Penske Racing	Dodge	49.882	180.426
15	14	Tony Stewart	Stewart Haas Racing	Chevrolet	49.894	180.382
16	43	A. J. Allmendinger	Richard Petty Motorsports	Ford	49.901	180.357
17	88	Dale Earnhardt Jr.	Hendrick Motorsports	Chevrolet	49.928	180.260
18	11	Denny Hamlin	Joe Gibbs Racing	Toyota	49.931	180.249
19	99	Carl Edwards	Roush Fenway Racing	Ford	49.939	180.220
20	71	Landon Cassill	TRG Motorsports	Chevrolet	49.941	180.213
21	7	Robby Gordon	Robby Gordon Motorsports	Toyota	49.957	180.155
22	78	Regan Smith	Furniture Row Racing	Chevrolet	49.987	180.047
23	18	Kyle Busch	Joe Gibbs Racing	Toyota	50.043	179.845
24	9	Kasey Kahne	Richard Petty Motorsports	Ford	50.058	179.791
25	77	Sam Hornish Jr.	Penske Racing	Dodge	50.114	179.591
26	98	Paul Menard	Richard Petty Motorsports	Ford	50.140	179.497
27	19	Elliott Sadler	Richard Petty Motorsports	Ford	50.290	178.962
28	6	David Ragan	Roush Fenway Racing	Ford	50.303	178.916
29	00	David Reutimann	Michael Waltrip Racing	Toyota	50.310	178.891
30	82	Scott Speed	Team Red Bull	Toyota	50.312	178.884
31	21	Bill Elliott	Wood Brothers Racing	Ford	50.323	178.845
32	83	Reed Sorenson	Team Red Bull	Toyota	50.325	178.838
33	87	Joe Nemechek	NEMCO Motorsports	Toyota	50.326	178.834
34	20	Joey Logano	Joe Gibbs Racing	Toyota	50.341	178.781
35	13	Max Papis	Germain Racing	Toyota	50.386	178.621
36	09	Bobby Labonte	Phoenix Racing	Chevrolet	50.455	178.377
37	55	Michael McDowell	Prism Motorsports	Toyota	50.465	178.341
38	37	Travis Kvapil	Front Row Motorsports	Ford	50.558	178.013
39	64	Todd Bodine	Gunselman Motorsports	Toyota	50.593	177.890
40	66	Dave Blaney	Prism Motorsports	Toyota	50.682	175.333
41	32	Jacques Villeneuve	Braun Racing	Toyota	50.714	175.490
42	47	Marcos Ambrose	JTG Daugherty Racing	Toyota	51.264	175.562
43	34	Kevin Conway	Front Row Motorsports	Ford	51.376	175.179
Did not qualify
	38	David Gilliland	Front Row Motorsports	Ford	50.910	176.783
	36	Casey Mears	Tommy Baldwin Racing	Chevrolet	50.955	176.626
	26	David Stremme	Latitude 43 Motorsports	Ford	51.068	176.236
	46	J. J. Yeley	Whitney Motorsports	Dodge	123.739	72.734

=== Race results ===
Pos	Grid	No.	Driver	Team	Manufacturer	Laps	Led	Points
1	4	1	Jamie McMurray	Earnhardt Ganassi Racing	Chevrolet	160	16	190
2	9	29	Kevin Harvick (W)	Richard Childress Racing	Chevrolet	160	5	175
3	7	16	Greg Biffle	Roush Fenway Racing	Ford	160	38	170
4	6	33	Clint Bowyer	Richard Childress Racing	Chevrolet	160	0	160
5	15	14	Tony Stewart (W)	Stewart Haas Racing	Chevrolet	160	0	155
6	10	31	Jeff Burton	Richard Childress Racing	Chevrolet	160	0	150
7	19	99	Carl Edwards	Roush Fenway Racing	Ford	160	1	151
8	23	18	Kyle Busch	Joe Gibbs Racing	Toyota	160	0	142
9	34	20	Joey Logano	Joe Gibbs Racing	Toyota	160	0	138
10	14	2	Kurt Busch	Penske Racing	Dodge	160	0	134
11	3	5	Mark Martin	Hendrick Motorsports	Chevrolet	160	10	135
12	13	17	Matt Kenseth	Roush Fenway Racing	Ford	160	0	127
13	24	9	Kasey Kahne	Richard Petty Motorsports	Ford	160	0	124
14	26	98	Paul Menard	Richard Petty Motorsports	Ford	160	0	121
15	18	11	Denny Hamlin	Joe Gibbs Racing	Toyota	160	0	118
16	16	43	A. J. Allmendinger	Richard Petty Motorsports	Ford	160	0	115
17	5	39	Ryan Newman	Stewart Haas Racing	Chevrolet	160	0	112
18	31	21	Bill Elliott (W)	Wood Brothers Racing	Ford	160	0	109
19	11	12	Brad Keselowski	Penske Racing	Dodge	160	0	106
20	28	6	David Ragan	Roush Fenway Racing	Ford	160	0	103
21	41	47	Marcos Ambrose	JTG Daugherty Racing	Toyota	160	0	100
22	2	48	Jimmie Johnson (W)	Hendrick Motorsports	Chevrolet	160	1	102
23	8	24	Jeff Gordon (W)	Hendrick Motorsports	Chevrolet	160	0	94
24	38	37	Travis Kvapil	Front Row Motorsports with Yates Racing	Ford	160	0	91
25	30	82	Scott Speed	Team Red Bull	Toyota	160	0	88
26	12	56	Martin Truex Jr.	Michael Waltrip Racing	Toyota	159	0	85
27	17	88	Dale Earnhardt Jr.	Hendrick Motorsports	Chevrolet	158	0	82
28	29	00	David Reutimann	Michael Waltrip Racing	Toyota	157	0	79
29	43	32	Jacques Villeneuve	Braun Racing	Toyota	157	0	76
30	25	77	Sam Hornish Jr.	Penske Racing	Dodge	157	0	73
31	36	09	Bobby Labonte (W)	Phoenix Racing	Chevrolet	150	0	70
32	1	42	Juan Pablo Montoya	Earnhardt Ganassi Racing	Chevrolet	145	86	77
33	22	78	Regan Smith	Furniture Row Racing	Chevrolet	135	0	64
34	43	34	Kevin Conway (R)	Front Row Motorsports with Yates Racing	Ford	124	1	66
35	32	83	Reed Sorenson	Team Red Bull	Toyota	89	0	58
36	21	7	Robby Gordon	Robby Gordon Motorsports	Toyota	68	0	55
37	39	64	Todd Bodine	Gunselman Motorsports	Toyota	59	0	52
38	27	19	Elliott Sadler	Richard Petty Motorsports	Ford	55	0	49
39	20	71	Landon Cassill	TRG Motorsports	Chevrolet	52	1	51
40	33	87	Joe Nemechek	NEMCO Motorsports	Toyota	33	1	48
41	40	66	Dave Blaney	Prism Motorsports	Toyota	20	0	40
42	37	55	Michael McDowell	Prism Motorsports	Toyota	19	0	37
43	35	13	Max Papis	Germain Racing	Toyota	15	0	34

Previous race: 2010 LifeLock.com 400	Sprint Cup Series; 2010 season	Next race: 2010 Sunoco Red Cross Pennsylvania 500
