= Carter McMurray =

American racing driver

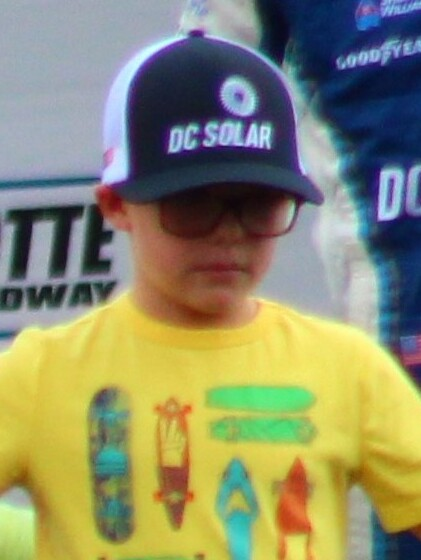
- McMurray at the 2018 Bank of America Roval 400
- Nationality: American
- Born: Carter Scott McMurray; November 25, 2010 (age 15) Mooresville, North Carolina, U.S.

SMART Modified Tour career
- Debut season: 2025
- Current team: Phil Stefanelli
- Years active: 2025–present
- Car number: 40
- Starts: 24
- Championships: 0
- Wins: 0
- Poles: 0
- Best finish: 7th in 2026
- Statistics up to date as of October 20, 2026.

Carter Scott McMurray (born November 25, 2010) is an American professional stock car racing driver who currently competes part-time in the SMART Modified Tour, driving the No. 40 for Phil Stefanelli. He is the son of former NASCAR Cup Series driver and 2010 Daytona 500 winner Jamie McMurray.

McMurray has also competed in the INEX Summer Shootout Series and the INEX Winter Heat Series.

== Motorsports results ==
=== SMART Modified Tour ===
SMART Modified Tour results
Year	Car owner	No.	Make	1	2	3	4	5	6	7	8	9	10	11	12	13	14	SMTC	Pts	Ref
2025	Phil Stefanelli	40	N/A	FLO; 5	AND; 9	SBO; 25	ROU; 19	HCY; 12	FCS; 13	CRW; 8	CPS	CAR	CRW; 8	DOM	FCS; 7	TRI; 11	NWS; 27	14th	307	
2026	Phil Stefanelli	40	N/A	FLO; 11	AND; 7	SBO; 25	DOM; 24	HCY; 8	WKS; 4	FCR; 3	CRW; 5	PUL; 5	CAR; 5	ROU; 2	TRI; 4	NWS; 25		7th	408	
