= Ryan Flores =

American racing driver (born 1987)

- Nationality: American
- Born: September 6, 1987 (age 39) Manasquan, New Jersey, U.S.

SMART Modified Tour career
- Debut season: 2026
- Years active: 2026–present
- Starts: 1
- Championships: 0
- Wins: 0
- Poles: 0
- Best finish: 60th in 2026
- Statistics up to date as of October 20, 2026.

Ryan "Skip" Flores (born September 6, 1987) is an American professional stock car racing driver and crew member who competes in the SMART Modified Tour, driving the No. 15 for his own team.

Raised in Manasquan, New Jersey, Flores attended Manasquan High School.

Flores is a co-host of the podcast Stacking Pennies with Corey LaJoie.

As a driver, Flores has also competed in series such as the Carolina Crate Modified Series, the Indoor Auto Racing Championship, the NASCAR Local Racing Series, and the World Series of Asphalt Stock Car Racing. As a crew member, he has worked for Team Penske, where he won the NASCAR Cup Series championship as a tire changer for Ryan Blaney in 2023, Front Row Motorsports, and Roush Fenway Racing.

== Motorsports results ==
=== SMART Modified Tour ===
SMART Modified Tour results
Year	Car owner	No.	Make	1	2	3	4	5	6	7	8	9	10	11	12	13	SMTC	Pts	Ref
2026	Ryan Flores Motorsports	15	N/A	FLO	AND	SBO	DOM	HCY	WKS	FCR	CRW	PUL	CAR	ROU; 20	TRI	NWS	60th	21	
