= Max Handley (racing driver) =

American racing driver

- Nationality: American
- Born: Medford, New York, U.S.

SMART Modified Tour career
- Debut season: 2025
- Years active: 2025–present
- Starts: 11
- Championships: 0
- Wins: 0
- Poles: 0
- Best finish: 16th in 2026
- Statistics up to date as of October 20, 2026.

Max Handley (birth date unknown) is an American professional stock car racing driver who currently competes in the SMART Modified Tour, driving the No. 45 for Joe Densieski. He is the brother of fellow racing driver Jack Handley Jr., who has also previously competed in the series.

Handley has also competed in the Aqua Duck 602 Speedweek Series, the World Series of Asphalt Stock Car Racing, the Winter Showdown, and the NASCAR Weekly Series, and is a regular competitor at Riverhead Raceway. having won the championship in the Street Stock division in 2024.

== Motorsports results ==
=== SMART Modified Tour ===
SMART Modified Tour results
Year	Car owner	No.	Make	1	2	3	4	5	6	7	8	9	10	11	12	13	14	SMTC	Pts	Ref
2025	Joe Densieski	45	N/A	FLO	AND	SBO	ROU	HCY	FCS	CRW	CPS; 11	CAR; 17	CRW	DOM	FCS	TRI; 25	NWS	31st	70	
2026	Joe Densieski	45	N/A	FLO; 15	AND; 13	SBO; 18	DOM; 15	HCY; 17	WKS; 5	FCR; 12	CRW; 21	PUL	CAR	ROU	TRI	NWS		16th	212	
