= Sean McElearney =

American racing driver (born 2006)

- Nationality: American
- Born: 2006 or 2007 (age 19–20) Babylon, New York, U.S.

SMART Modified Tour career
- Debut season: 2026
- Years active: 2026–present
- Starts: 13
- Championships: 0
- Wins: 0
- Poles: 2
- Best finish: 12th in 2026
- Statistics up to date as of October 20, 2026.

Sean McElearney (born 2006) is an American professional stock car racing driver who currently competes full-time in the SMART Modified Tour, driving the No. 15 for Grady Jeffreys Jr., and the No. 99 for Jamie Tomaino. He is the grandson of Paul McElearney, who previously competed in the NASCAR Whelen Modified Tour in the 1980s, as well as having won multiple track championships at Riverhead Raceway.

McElearney has also competed in series such as the Carolina Crate Modified Series, the INEX Summer Shootout Series, the World Series of Asphalt Stock Car Racing, and the NASCAR Weekly Series.

== Motorsports results ==
=== SMART Modified Tour ===
SMART Modified Tour results
Year	Car owner	No.	Make	1	2	3	4	5	6	7	8	9	10	11	12	13	SMTC	Pts	Ref
2026	Grady Jeffreys Jr.	15	N/A	FLO; 9				HCY; 3	WKS; 19	FCR; 11		PUL; 8				NWS; 4	12th	338	
2026	Jamie Tomaino	99	N/A		AND; 21	SBO; 15	DOM; 25				CRW; 24		CAR; 13	ROU; 19			12th	338	
2026	Grady Jeffreys Jr.	15SM	N/A												TRI; 25		12th	338	
