= Steve Zacharias =

American track promoter & racing driver

- Nationality: American
- Born: Concord, North Carolina, U.S.

SMART Modified Tour career
- Debut season: 2001
- Years active: 2001, 2026–present
- Starts: 7
- Championships: 0
- Wins: 0
- Poles: 0
- Best finish: 26th in 2001
- Statistics up to date as of March 19, 2026.

Steve Zacharias (birth date unknown) is an American professional stock car racing driver and track promoter who is the owner of Florence Motor Speedway. He also competes in the SMART Modified Tour, driving the No. 21Z for his own team.

As a driver, Zacharias has also competed in the Atlantic Turfscapes Super Truck Series, the Race of Champions Asphalt Modified Tour, and the World Series of Asphalt Stock Car Racing.

== Track ownership ==
In July 2020, Zacharias and business partners Brian Vause and Savannah Brotherton formed Speedway Plus Promotion LLC, becoming the promoters for Florence Motor Speedway, a 0.400 mi (0.644 km) oval located at 836 East Smith Street in Timmonsville, 75 mi (121 km) from the track but in the same metropolitan region owned by Charlie Powell Jr., whose family has raced in the NASCAR Weekly Series (son Robert was the 1988 national champion). The Powell family and Zacharias' group signed a lease-to-own agreement that lasted from July 2020 to the end of the 2023 season. At the end of the 2023 season, Zacharias acquired full ownership.

For 2025, the track announced that they would be an "outlaw" unsanctioned track for the 2025 season, leaving NASCAR sanctioning. As part of the "outlaw" status, the track would join forces with Southern National Motorsports Park in sharing rules and competitor licences. Later they year, it was announced that the track would take over promotion of New River All American Speedway in Jacksonville, North Carolina, which was renamed Coastal Plains Raceway, allowing Florence and Southern National to have a third track to share rules and competitors licences for 2026.

== Personal life ==
Zacharias' son, Owen, currently races in bandoleros.

== Motorsports results ==
=== SMART Modified Tour ===
SMART Modified Tour results
Year	Car owner	No.	Make	1	2	3	4	5	6	7	8	9	10	11	12	13	SMTC	Pts	Ref
2001	N/A	25	N/A	CRW	CRW	AND; 17	LAN	CRW; 17	MYB; 22	ACE	CRW	PUL	CRW	CRW; 23	CRW; 17	SBS; 23	26th	706	
2026	Steve Zacharias	21Z	N/A	FLO; 22	AND	SBO	DOM	HCY	WKS	FCR	CRW	PUL	CAR	ROU	TRI	NWS	68th	19	
