= Jamie McMurray =

American racing driver (born 1976)

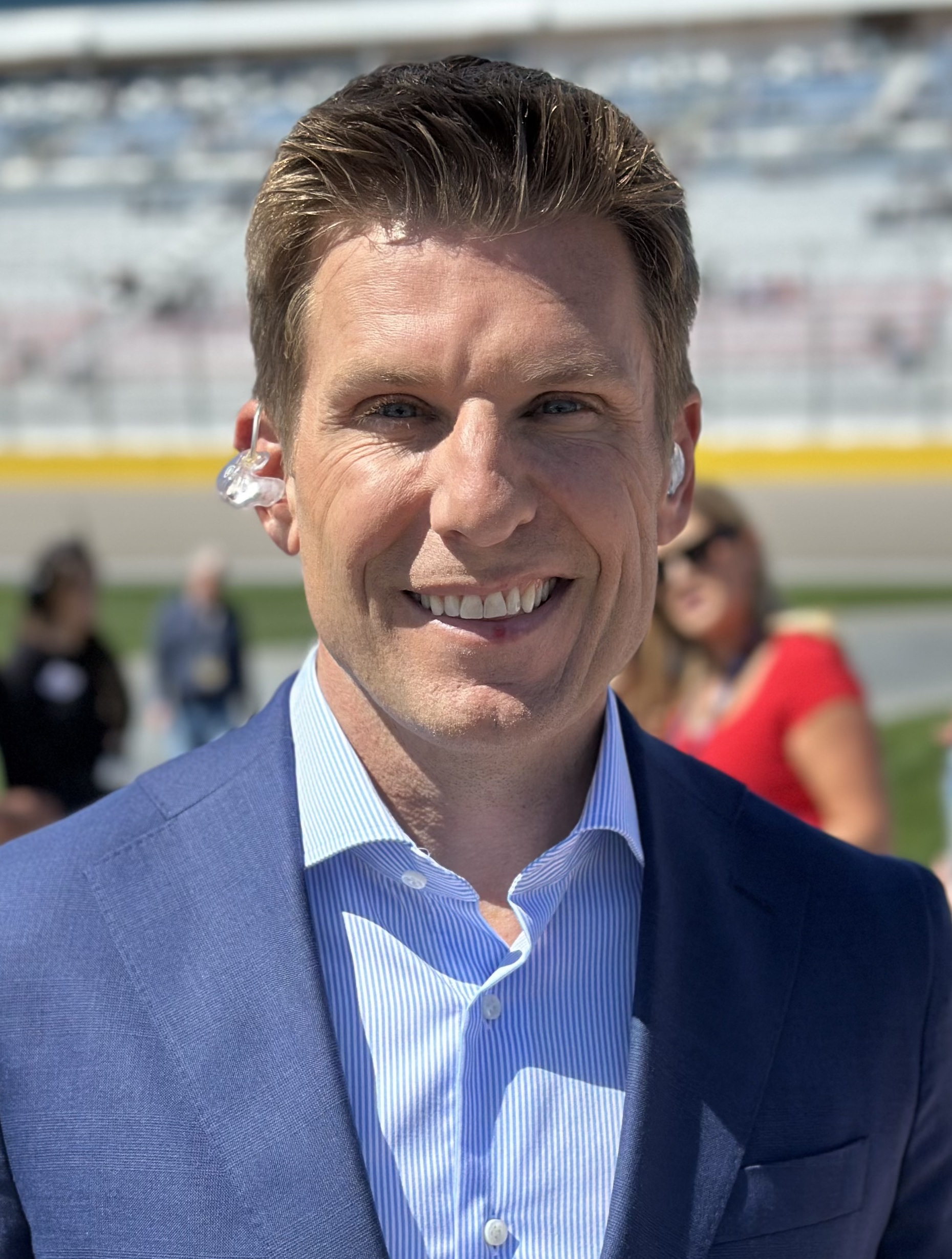
- McMurray at Las Vegas Motor Speedway in 2025
- Born: James Christopher McMurray; June 3, 1976 (age 50); Joplin, Missouri, U.S.
- Height: 5 ft 8 in (1.73 m)
- Weight: 150 lb (68 kg)
- Achievements: 2003 NASCAR Cup Series Rookie of the Year; 2010 Daytona 500 Winner; 2010 Brickyard 400 Winner; 2013 Sprint Showdown Winner; 2014 Sprint All-Star Race Winner; 2015 Rolex 24 at Daytona Overall Winner

NASCAR Cup Series career
- 584 races run over 19 years
- 2021 position: 33rd
- Best finish: 11th (2004)
- First race: 2002 EA Sports 500 (Talladega)
- Last race: 2021 Daytona 500 (Daytona)
- First win: 2002 UAW-GM Quality 500 (Charlotte)
- Last win: 2013 Camping World RV Sales 500 (Talladega)
Wins	Top tens	Poles
7	169	11

NASCAR O'Reilly Auto Parts Series career
- 190 races run over 14 years
- 2018 position: 96th
- Best finish: 6th (2002)
- First race: 2000 Sam's Town 250 (Memphis)
- Last race: 2018 Alsco 300 (Charlotte)
- First win: 2002 Aaron's 312 (Atlanta)
- Last win: 2010 Great Clips 300 (Atlanta)
Wins	Top tens	Poles
8	70	3

NASCAR FedEx Freight Truck Series career
- 26 races run over 5 years
- 2026 position: 88th
- Best finish: 22nd (2000)
- First race: 1999 O'Reilly Auto Parts 200 (I-70)
- Last race: 2026 Navy 250 (San Diego)
- First win: 2004 Kroger 200 (Martinsville)
Wins	Top tens	Poles
1	6	3
- Statistics up to date as of November 6, 2026.

James Christopher McMurray (born June 3, 1976), nicknamed "Jamie Mac", is an American semi-retired professional stock car racing driver and currently an analyst for NASCAR on Fox and NASCAR on The CW. He raced in the NASCAR Cup Series on a full-time basis from 2003 to 2018 before shifting to a Daytona 500-only schedule in 2019 and 2021.

McMurray earned his first win in just his second career start in October 2002. He is also known for winning the 2010 Daytona 500 for Chip Ganassi Racing, and is one of only three drivers to win both the Daytona 500 and Brickyard 400 in the same year.

== Racing career ==
=== Craftsman Truck and Busch Series (1999–2002) ===
In 1999, McMurray made five starts in the Craftsman Truck Series. In 2000, he ran sixteen Truck races and posted one top-five and four top-ten finishes. During 2001 and 2002, he competed full-time in the Busch Series, driving the No. 27 Williams Travel Centers Chevrolet Monte Carlo for Brewco Motorsports. The latter year was better for McMurray, as he won two races and finished sixth in the overall points standings.

After his surprise win at Lowe's Motor Speedway in Charlotte in the No. 40 Winston Cup car, he won his first NASCAR Busch Series win at the Aaron's 312 at the Atlanta Motor Speedway in October by beating Joe Nemechek and Michael Waltrip on fuel mileage. McMurray only led one lap total and became the one-hundredth different driver to win in the Grand National Series. He then won the next weekend at the Sam's Club 200 at North Carolina Motor Speedway by leading only the last two laps as leaders Jeff Green and Michael Waltrip wrecked each other on the last lap. McMurray finished the year sixth in final points, 772 points behind champion Greg Biffle, who would end up being his rookie rival in 2003.

=== First stint with Chip Ganassi Racing (2002–2005) ===
McMurray's entry into Cup racing did not go as planned. McMurray was scheduled to drive a limited schedule in a No. 42 Chip Ganassi Racing Dodge in 2002, in preparation for a full-time 2003 rookie of the year campaign in the No. 42 with new sponsor Texaco/Havoline. However, he was instead tapped as interim replacement for injured Ganassi Cup driver Sterling Marlin, who fractured a vertebra in a crash at Kansas Speedway. Thus, McMurray made his Cup debut in the No. 40 Coors Light Dodge at Talladega. One week later, at Charlotte, in just his second career NASCAR Winston Cup and first non-restrictor plate start, McMurray outraced the Joe Gibbs Racing Pontiacs of Bobby Labonte and Tony Stewart to win the UAW-GM Quality 500. McMurray had been consistent the entire night and led 96 of the final one hundred laps to score the win. It is considered one of the biggest upsets in NASCAR history. This win set a modern-era record for fewest starts before a win (since tied by Trevor Bayne in the 2011 Daytona 500, and eclipsed by Shane van Gisbergen winning his Cup Series debut in 2023), and it was also the first time a driver won in their first start at a 1.5-mile track. McMurray drove for six of the remaining seven races, except for the Old Dominion 500 at Martinsville, with Mike Bliss driving as scheduled in the No. 40.

In 2003, McMurray joined the Cup Series full-time. He won Rookie of the Year honors by 37 points over Greg Biffle. McMurray had five top-fives, thirteen top-tens, and finished thirteenth in the overall standings. He began competing part-time in the Busch Series.

In 2004, McMurray and his team were penalized 25 points after the Food City 500 for an incorrect "x-measurement," a method of comparing the center of the roof with the center of the chassis, which proved costly when later in the year, McMurray missed the Chase for the Cup by fifteen points. If he had made the playoff field, McMurray would have finished the year fourth in points due to his strong performance in the Chase races. The same weekend of the penalty, McMurray was fined $15,000 by NASCAR for intentionally causing a wreck after the race was over.

He had 23 Top 10s during the season, including twelve in the last fourteen races, and finished eleventh in the points standings, which earned him a $1 million bonus. In the same year, he won a Truck Series race, joining 20 other drivers who have won a race in all three of NASCAR's top touring series. In 2005, McMurray scored four top-fives and ten top-tens to finish twelfth in points. McMurray came in tenth in points with a one-point cushion over Ryan Newman in the final race before the chase at Richmond International Raceway. McMurray was wrecked by Tony Raines later in the race, ending his chase hopes.

McMurray left the No. 42 team after the 2005 season to drive for Roush Racing. Owner Chip Ganassi was initially adamant that McMurray would be held to his contract, but on November 7, 2005, McMurray was released when Ganassi and partner Felix Sabates learned that McMurray had signed a contract with Roush already before the season ended. McMurray was originally to go to the No. 6 Ford in 2006, but since Mark Martin announced he would race for another year, McMurray instead took over for Kurt Busch in the No. 97 Crown Royal/IRWIN Tools Ford (which was then renumbered No. 26).

=== Stint with Roush Fenway Racing (2006–2009) ===
In April 2006, Jack Roush moved Jimmy Fennig from crew chief of the No. 26 Ford to head Roush's Busch operations. Bob Osborne, who had been crew chief for Carl Edwards, moved to head the crew for McMurray. 2006 was a hard season for McMurray. McMurray's best finish of the 2006 season came at Dover International Speedway, where he finished second after leading the most laps. McMurray would record three top fives, seven top tens, and finish a disappointing 25th in points.

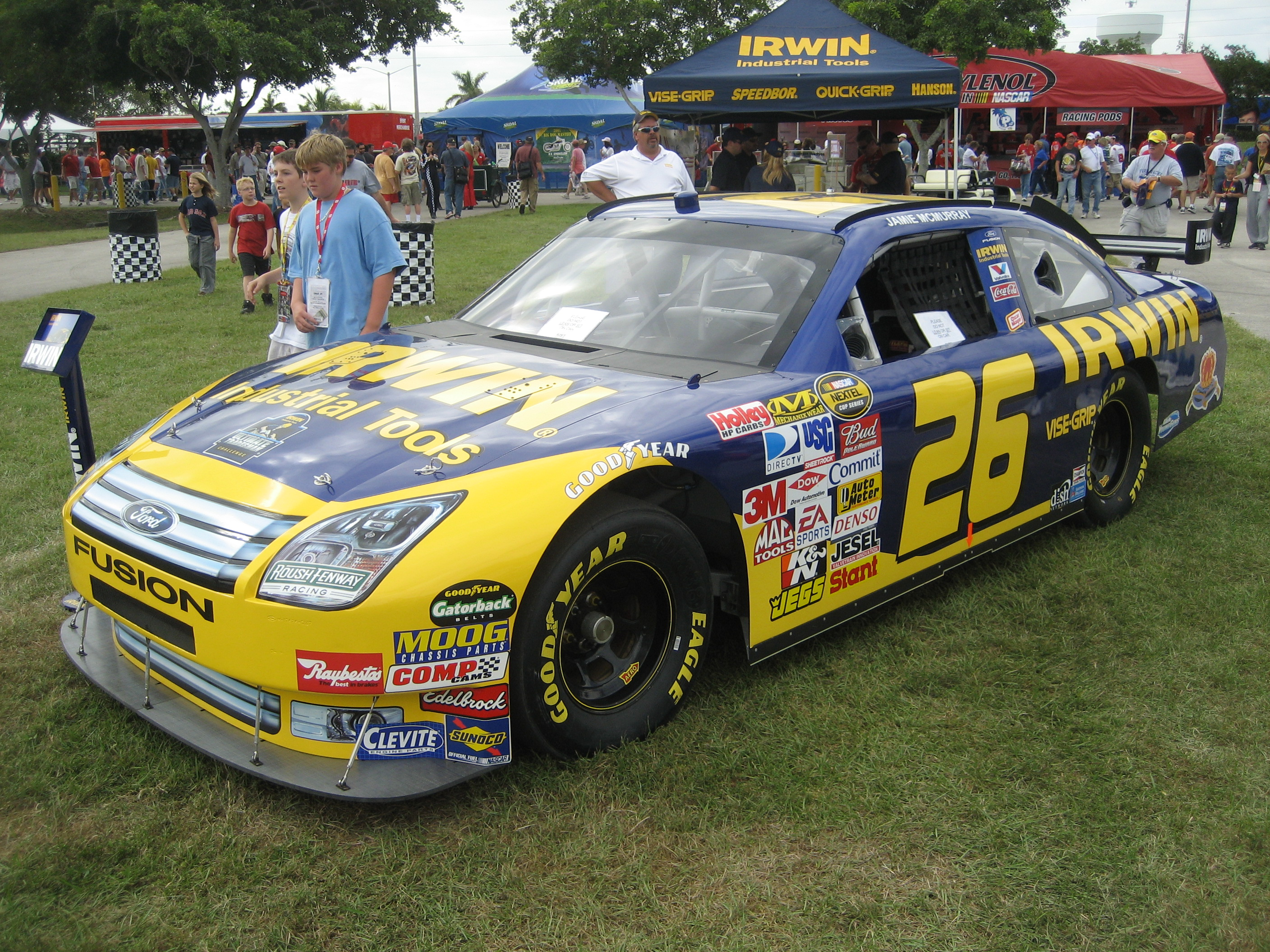
McMurray's Roush car on display during the 2007 Ford Championship Weekend at the Homestead-Miami Speedway

McMurray began the 2007 season with crew chief Larry Carter. On June 22, 2007, he won his third career Cup pole for the Toyota Save/Mart 350. On lap 1, he was passed by Robby Gordon for the lead, but he spent the first quarter of the race holding off Boris Said and Jeff Burton for second place. When Robby Gordon pitted after 34 laps, McMurray traded the lead repeatedly. With about 45 laps left, McMurray took the lead and dominated the final laps, but with seven to go, Cup rookie and his future teammate Juan Pablo Montoya passed him and held him off until McMurray eventually ran out of gas with two to go and resulting in 37th. On July 7 at the Pepsi 400, McMurray led a few laps in the first stages. However, on lap thirty, McMurray was then black-flagged by NASCAR for slipping out of bounds. He then spent the rest of the race charging back through the field, eventually getting back to the front on lap 155. McMurray then led the final stages but battled Kyle Busch for five laps. On the last lap, Busch was the leader next to McMurray and charged to the finish, but at the last second, McMurray charged one last time and barely beat Busch to win the Pepsi 400 for his second career Cup win. The margin was 0.005 of a second, and the finish resembled the Daytona 500 of the year's finish when Kevin Harvick beat Mark Martin at the last second of the race that year. The photo finish, at that time, was the closest in Daytona International Speedway history and tied for the second closest finish (1993 DieHard 500) since the advent of electronic scoring in 1993. McMurray finished the year 17th in the point standings.

In the beginning of the 2008 season, McMurray encountered a string of poor finishes that relegated him to 36th in points and thus not guaranteed a spot when NASCAR reached the spring Martinsville race. When the current points went into effect to determine those who were locked in the race, McMurray was required to qualify for the race based on his time around the track. He qualified 5th, locking himself into the field as the fastest of the teams not locked into the race. He earned an 8th-place finish in the race, securing himself a spot in the Top 35 in points and thus a guaranteed starting position for the next race. Throughout the remainder of the season, he steadily climbed in the standings and reached the top twenty in points. On October 11, 2008, McMurray rallied to finish 5th in the Bank of America 500 at Lowe's Motor Speedway. It was his first top-five finish since his victory at Daytona in July of the previous year. McMurray finished sixteenth in the standings.

McMurray reunited with former crew chief Donnie Wingo in 2009. Crew chief Larry Carter moved to Yates Racing to be crew chief for Paul Menard. McMurray started the 2009 season by dominating the final stages of the Budweiser Shootout, but finished second when he lost the lead to Kevin Harvick on the last lap. McMurray had an excellent Speedweeks, finishing ninth in his Gatorade Duel. In the Daytona 500, McMurray ran up front and was a contender, but was involved in the big one, and his teammate Matt Kenseth won the race. Later in the year, Roush Fenway Racing informed McMurray he would be allowed to leave the team as they needed to cut their teams down to the NASCAR-mandated four. On November 1, 2009, McMurray won the AMP Energy 500 at Talladega after leading over 20 laps and passing David Stremme with eight laps to go. He then survived a green-white checkered finish to earn his second restrictor-plate win. Roush released him and the No. 26 team at the end of the season due to NASCAR's four-team limit and the expiration of Roush Fenway Racing's exemption that allowed a fifth team. McMurray decided to ask former boss Chip Ganassi for another chance following his disappointing era on Roush-Fenway Racing, and Ganassi granted him a contract to let him drive for his merged team with Dale Earnhardt Inc., Earnhardt Ganassi Racing.

=== Return to Ganassi (2010–2018) ===
In 2010, McMurray moved over to Earnhardt Ganassi Racing in the No. 1 car, replacing Martin Truex Jr. McMurray reunited with Chip Ganassi when he participated in the 2010 24 Hours of Daytona; it was the first time he has been with Ganassi since 2005.

==== Milestone season ====
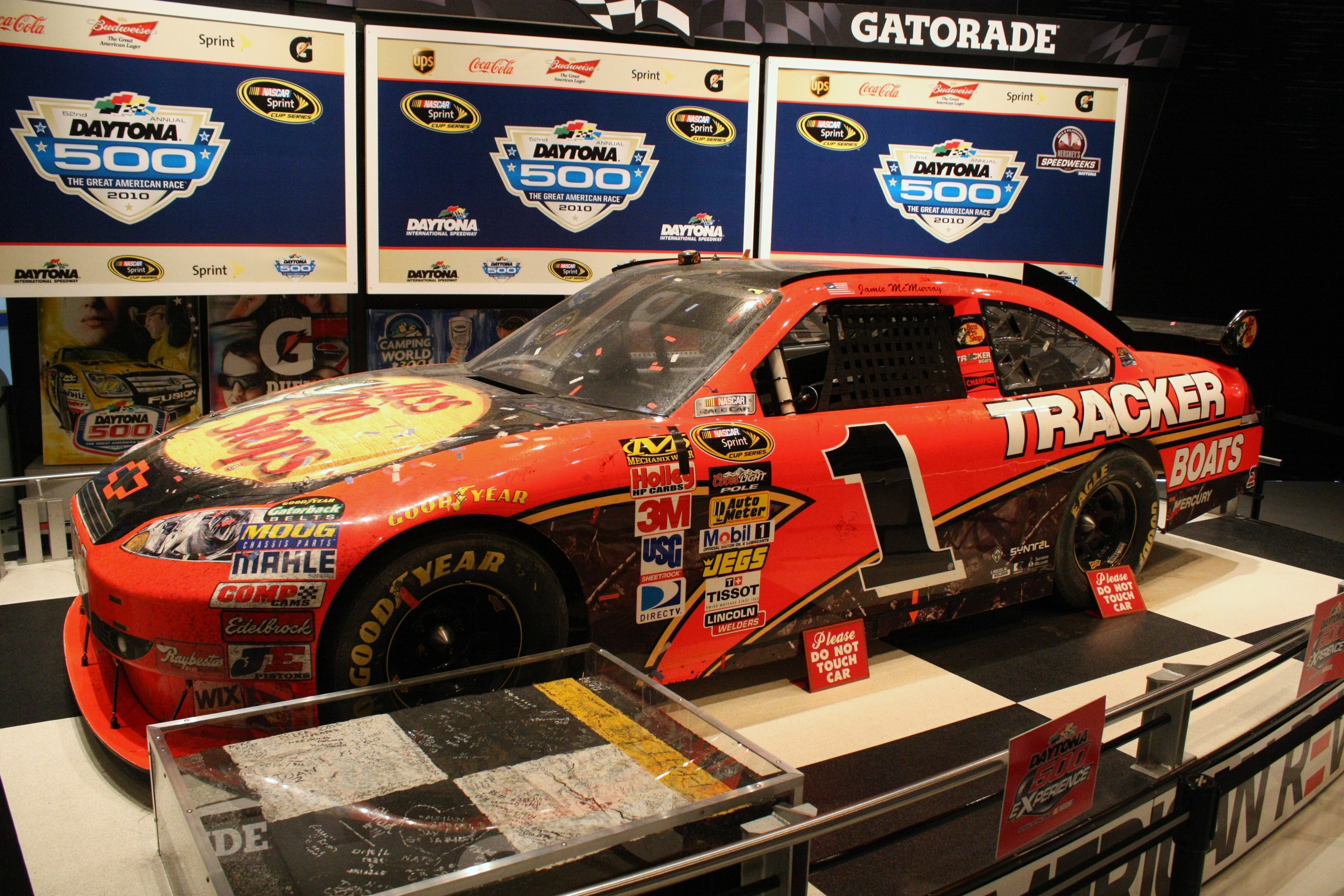
McMurray's 2010 Daytona 500 race-winning car

On February 14, 2010, McMurray would start the year off with a bang when, in just his first start for Ganassi since 2005, he won the Daytona 500. He led for only two laps, the least in Daytona 500 history at the time, passing Kevin Harvick with two to go before holding off Greg Biffle and a rapidly charging Dale Earnhardt Jr. McMurray cried in victory lane and thanked Ganassi and his new sponsors for giving him another chance. McMurray accidentally crashed into his new teammate and former rival, Juan Pablo Montoya, at Las Vegas. McMurray apologized, but Montoya said after the race that he felt like McMurray wasn't helping the team much, although later they made up. McMurray almost won the Aaron's 499 that spring, but Kevin Harvick beat him in a .011-second drag race to the finish line. McMurray led 27 laps. It was speculated by McMurray's car owner Felix Sabates, that Harvick went below the yellow line when he made the pass, but this was denied by NASCAR.

In May, McMurray ended up second to Kurt Busch in the Coca-Cola 600 and had several more top ten finishes before in July, McMurray held off Harvick again to win the Brickyard 400, which made him one of only three drivers to win the Daytona 500 and the Brickyard 400 in the same year, the feat previously having been accomplished by Jimmie Johnson in 2006 and Dale Jarrett in 1996. Chip Ganassi became the first owner to win both races (with McMurray) and the Indianapolis 500 (with Dario Franchitti) in the same year. In September, McMurray held off Kyle Busch to win the Great Clips 300 in the Nationwide Series at Atlanta. Although he did not make the Chase, he did win the Bank of America 500 at the site of his first win — Charlotte Motor Speedway. McMurray finished fourteenth in the standings with three wins nine top-fives and twelve top-tens.

==== Contract extension ====
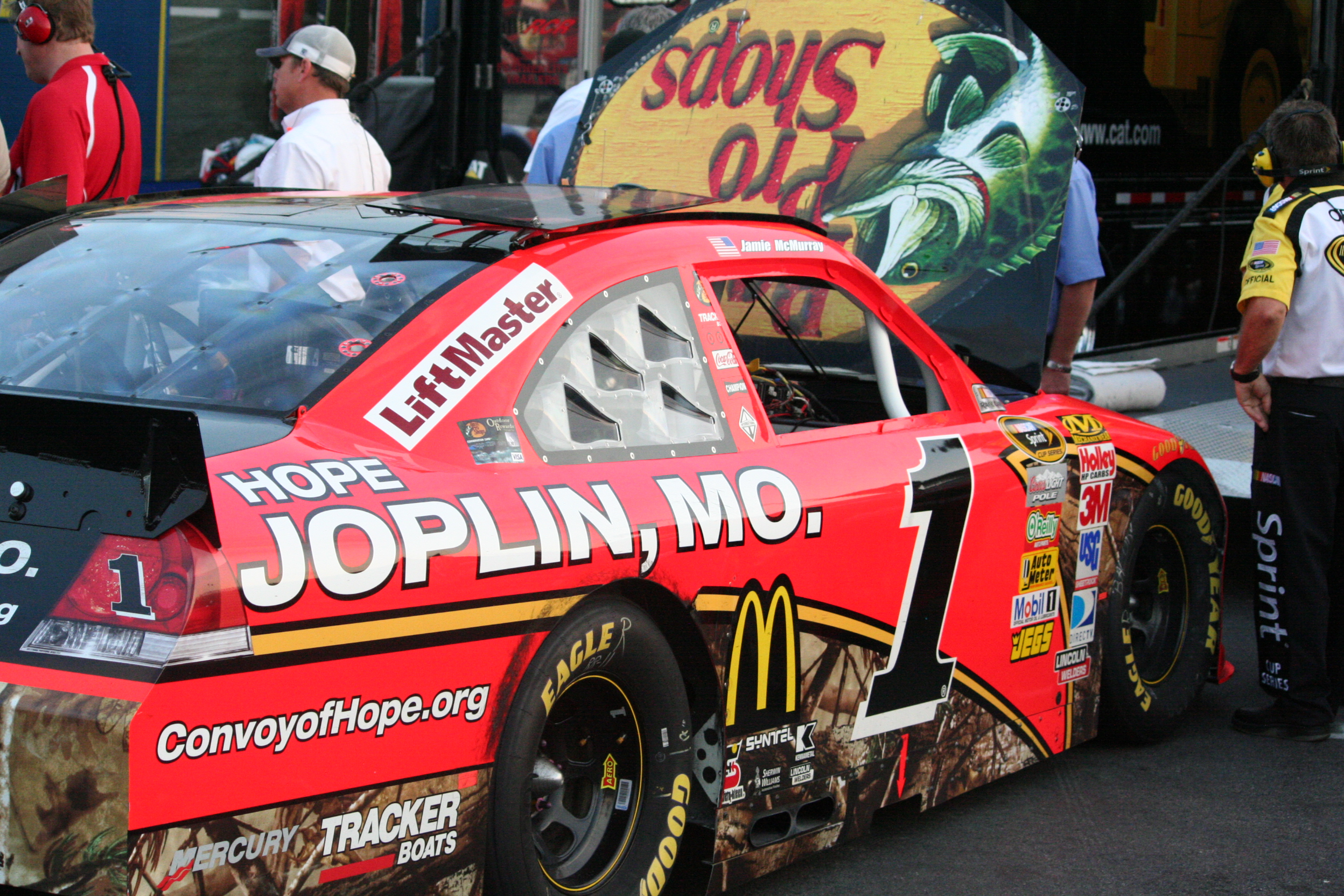
McMurray's car for the 2011 Coca-Cola 600, run in support of his hometown of Joplin, Missouri

On January 19, 2011, McMurray signed a multi-year extension with Earnhardt Ganassi Racing to continue driving the No. 1 Chevrolet. He won the pole for the Goody's Fast Relief 500 at Martinsville, where he finished seventh. Following the massive tornado that went through McMurray's home city Joplin, Missouri, McMurray listed Joplin as one of his racing sponsors to help his town. He blew his engine during the Coca-Cola 600 while battling Matt Kenseth for the race lead. In July, McMurray came close to winning the Brickyard 400 by passing Paul Menard with nine laps left, but with four laps remaining, Menard took back the lead, and while Menard charged to his first Cup victory, McMurray ended up fourth with a good record in July. McMurray congratulated Menard publicly after the race when he was interviewed about his finish. However, McMurray's second season with Earnhardt Ganassi Racing was a disappointment compared to his first; he earned just four top-tens that year, and finished the season 27th in points.

2012 was not much better for McMurray. He started the season with a crash in the Daytona 500. The next week, in Phoenix, McMurray had an accident before blowing an engine; he then posted two straight seventh-place finishes at both Las Vegas and Bristol. He would not post another top ten until the Pocono race in June. McMurray contended to win at Talladega in the fall race, but Harvick spun McMurray in the final laps; thus, McMurray finished the season with only three top-tens and no victories.

==== Final wins ====
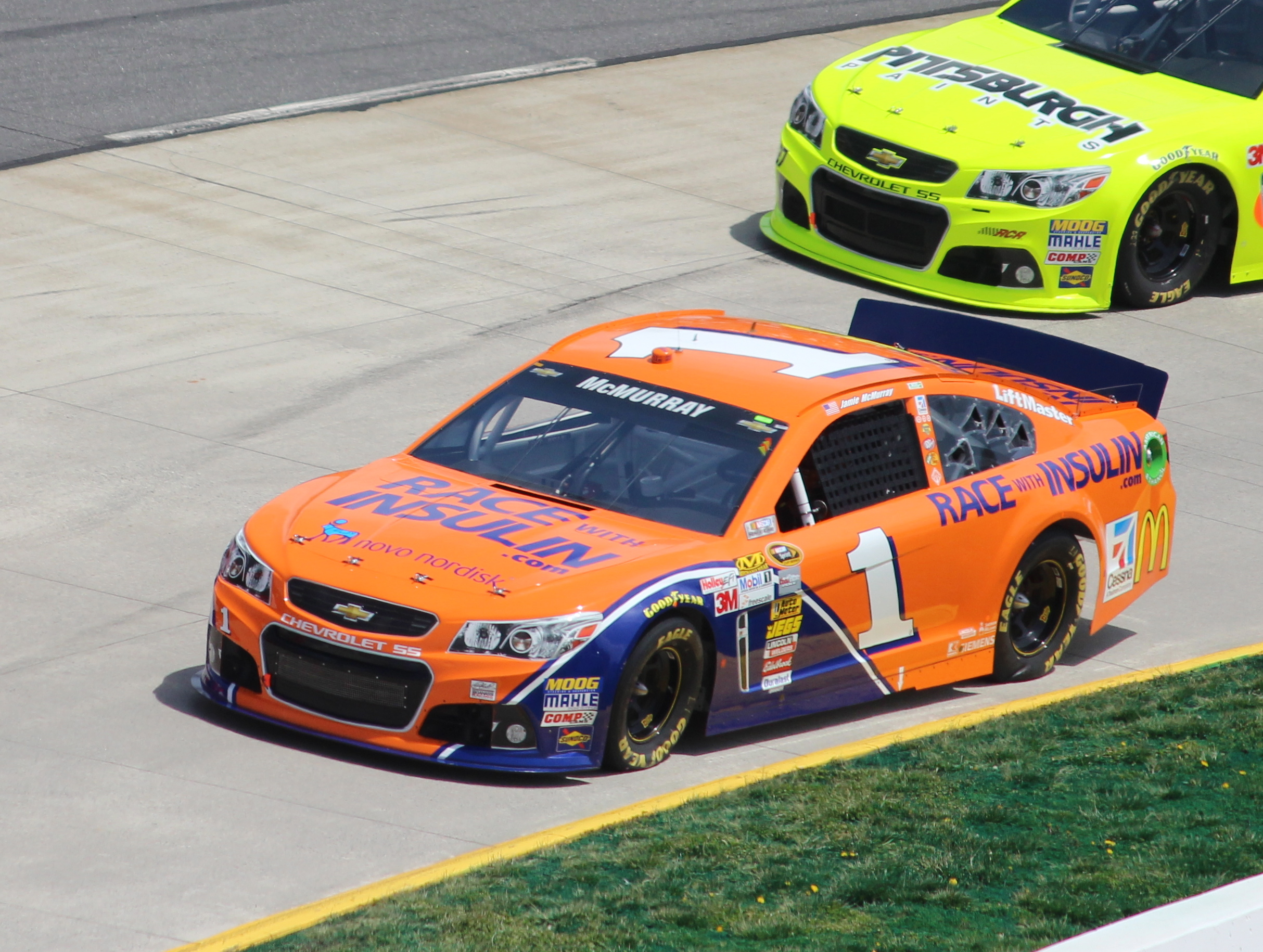
McMurray during the 2013 STP Gas Booster 500

McMurray started his season on a low note, crashing in the Daytona 500 on lap 33, relegating him to a 32nd-place finish, followed by a 22nd-place finish at Phoenix. At Las Vegas, the third race of the year, McMurray improved, with a thirteenth-place finish. The following week, at Bristol, he scored a tenth-place finish; this was his first Top 10 of the season, despite spinning out in the middle of the race. Then, after a nineteenth-place finish in Fontana, McMurray finished a season-best 7th place in Martinsville, despite being involved in an early collision with Clint Bowyer. McMurray then had a 16th-place finish at Texas and took another seventh-place finish at Kansas, bringing him up to three top-ten and six top-twenty finishes.

McMurray took home first place in the non-points-paying 2013 Sprint Showdown at Charlotte Motor Speedway. Leading all 40 laps, the Cup win was his first since the 2010 Bank of America 500, which also came at Charlotte. He would go on to finish eighth in the NASCAR Sprint All-Star Race. McMurray would hit a low stretch, with a nineteenth-place finish in the Coca-Cola 600 and a 33rd-place finish at Dover. He then had a thirteenth-place finish at Pocono. At Michigan, McMurray led 21 laps but finished 33rd after a late accident. The following week at Sonoma, McMurray narrowly beat Marcos Ambrose to win his first pole of the season.

McMurray then had two strong runs - a runner-up finish to Matt Kenseth at Kentucky, followed by the Coke Zero 400, where he led ten laps and finished seventh. He followed that up with a solid twelfth-place finish at New Hampshire.

In October, McMurray held off Dale Earnhardt Jr. and Ricky Stenhouse Jr. to win at Talladega, snapping a 108-race winless streak. This was his seventh career victory and fourth on a restrictor plate track (with wins at Daytona in 2007 and 2010 and Talladega in November 2009).

McMurray had a slow start to the 2014 season, finishing fourteenth at Daytona after a last-lap crash, though he posted a top-ten at Fontana. His performances improved at the All-Star Race. After starting in the top ten, McMurray controlled 40% of the ninety-lap race, passed leader Carl Edwards on the final restart, and held off Kevin Harvick for $1,370,400. He was very emotional about his win and gave credit for the win to his pit crew, thanking his new crew chief Keith Rodden.

On lap 165 of the FedEx 400, McMurray drove into a chunk of concrete, causing his car to turn sideways. The resulting pothole, which was 8 in.x 10 in., led to a red flag that lasted 22 minutes and 22 seconds.

On June 21, 2014, McMurray won the pole for the Toyota/Save Mart 350 for his first pole of the 2014 season and the tenth of his career. McMurray finished 16th at New Hampshire, after a solid 5th place start. At the Irwin Tools Night Race, McMurray had a car to beat, led the most laps (148), and had the lead with 67 laps to go, but faded towards the end of the race and finished eighth. McMurray had a good end to the season, grabbing a top-ten at Homestead. He finished in eighteenth in the overall standings, seventy-three points behind his teammate Kyle Larson.

==== 2015–2018 ====
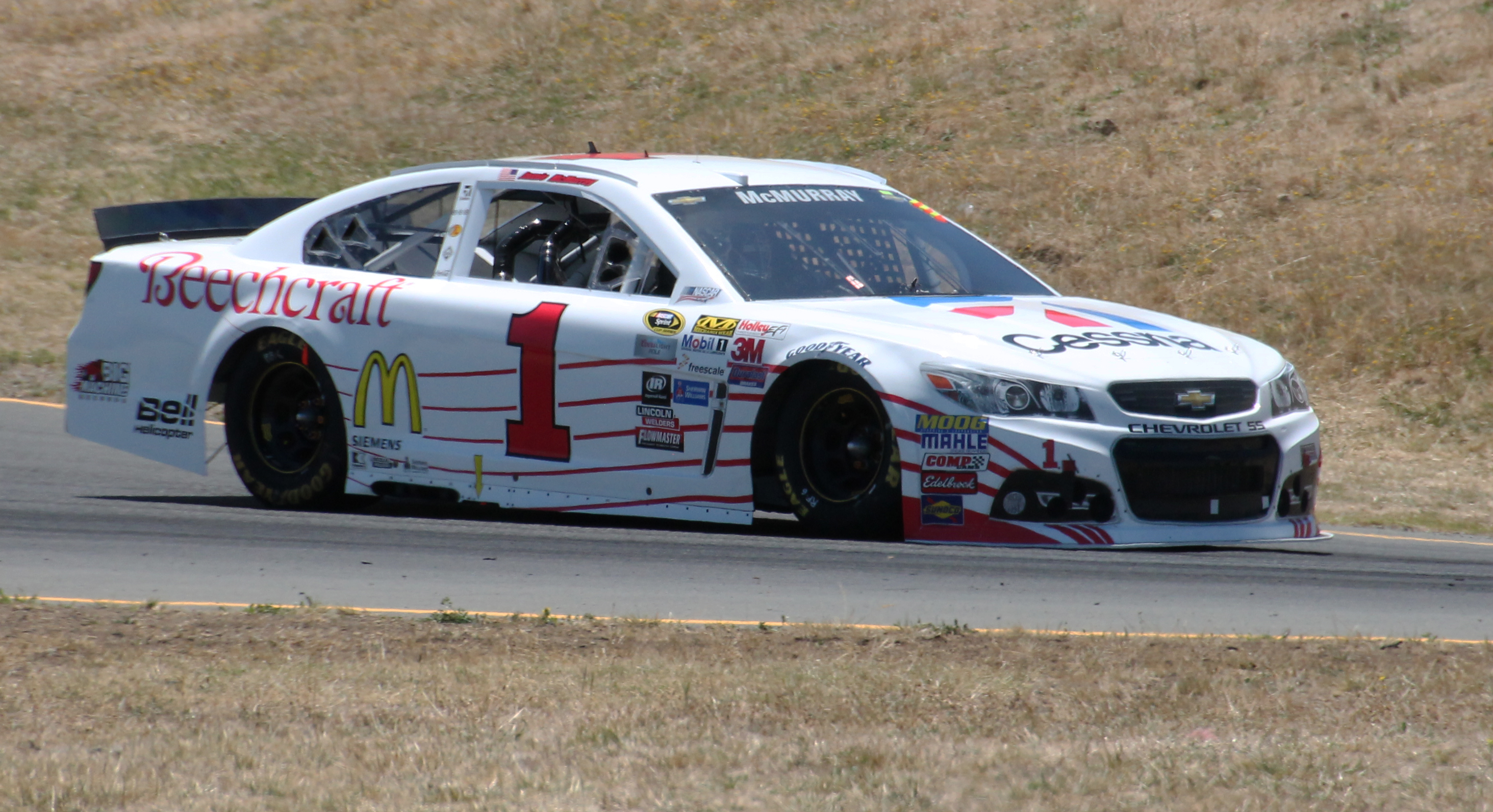
McMurray racing during the 2015 Toyota/Save Mart 350

McMurray had another crew chief change entering 2015, his second swap in two years. His new crew chief is former RCR Engineer Matt McCall. McMurray started the year out poorly with finishes of 27th and 40th at Daytona and Atlanta after being involved in two crashes. He then scored an eleventh at Las Vegas. Coming to the fourth race of the season (Phoenix), he contended with Kevin Harvick for the win, but ended in second. He finished 21st at Auto Club. However, he experienced a good streak of races, a tenth at Martinsville, a sixth at Texas, a fourteenth at Bristol, and a fourth at Richmond, where it looked like McMurray was one of the only drivers who could challenge the winner Kurt Busch. He finished 11th at Talladega. After ten races, McMurray was 7th in the standings - the highest he had ever been since the second race of 2010. He had a 44-point cushion over 17th place.

Starting the summer part of the season, McMurray posted a thirteenth-place finish at Kansas. He posted a sixteenth at the All-Star race after leading Segment 3. He finished nineteenth in the Coca-Cola 600. McMurray had a strong run afterward, coming seventh at Dover, Pocono, and Michigan consecutively. He then finished eleventh at Sonoma after a tire issue early threw a wrench in the team's plans. The next week, McMurray's car was involved in a nine-car practice crash and was forced to a backup car for the Coke Zero 400 at Daytona; the backup car was slow during the race, and he was involved in multiple large accidents. Still, due to the majority of the field being involved in wrecks, McMurray was able to hang on to finish fifteenth. After seventeen races, McMurray was sixth in points, the highest winless driver in the points. He also had an 85-point cushion over Aric Almirola. McMurray finished fourteenth at Kentucky after starting seventh. McMurray lost one spot in the standings to seventh. McMurray looked to grab a top 10 at New Hampshire until he lost a cylinder in his engine and finished 26th. As a result, he dropped to 9th in the standings. Over the next few races, he didn't pick up many points due to a 40th at Watkins Glen. At Bristol, he rallied back for an 11th, which kept him in 10th place in the driver standings. He went on to make the Chase for the first time in his career, seeded 12th in the standings.

At Chicagoland, McMurray started 13th and finished sixteenth. At New Hampshire, he started 23rd and finished fourteenth. Heading into Dover, he started eleventh due to rain washing out qualifying. He was eleventh in the points, just two points above the cut line for who would be eliminated from the Chase going into the Contender Round, and one point above Dale Earnhardt Jr., who marked the cutoff line. During the race, McMurray would be locked in a constant battle with Earnhardt for control of the final transfer spot. Ultimately, Earnhardt finished third and McMurray finished fourth, which tied them in points, which was broken in favor of Earnhardt, which cut McMurray from the Chase.

On September 19, 2015, McMurray joined NASCAR on NBC for the Xfinity Series race at Chicagoland as a guest analyst.

At Martinsville, McMurray looked to be set to finish one lap down in 24th place. However, after a caution with less than fifty laps to go, caused by Matt Kenseth intentionally wrecking Joey Logano, McMurray got back on the lead lap and, after a pit stop, had the fastest car in the field. McMurray, with the fastest car, charged through the field after a restart to finish second behind Jeff Gordon.

McMurray started out the 2016 season with a seventeenth-place finish at Daytona. During the next three races, he finished sixteenth, sixteenth, and 21st, before getting his first top-ten, a tenth at Fontana. McMurray would spin at Martinsville and finish outside the top twenty. After finishing inside the top twenty over the next three races, McMurray would be involved in the big one at Talladega. However, he would rally back for a fourth place, his first top five and second top ten of the year.

The next two weeks were rough for McMurray, as at Kansas, he was penalized by NASCAR and forced to repair damage from a crewman who body-slammed the car (NASCAR determined this was an illegal body modification). He spent the rest of the race trying to catch up and ultimately finished 26th. At Dover, he got caught up in the big one and finished several laps down in 21st. Three races later, McMurray would finish ninth at Michigan. After a seventeenth at Sonoma, McMurray would contend at Daytona, but contact from Kyle Larson and Jimmie Johnson would cause him to spin, causing the big one.

As the summer began to wind down, McMurray would heat up. He finished seventh at Kentucky in a fuel mileage race. A good sixth place at New Hampshire would allow him to slip further ahead of his competition. However, a spin at Indy, and Chris Buescher winning at Pocono didn't help, although McMurray still finished in the top 20 for both races. He would then score three eighth-place finishes in a row, at Watkins Glen, Bristol, and Michigan, allowing McMurray to slip past Ryan Newman in the chase standings. This would be good, as when Kyle Larson won at Michigan, McMurray would find himself fifteen points in, ahead of Newman. Eventually, Newman still looked to be in contention before he was penalized for failing an inspection and docked a significant number of points, giving McMurray a big advantage over Newman going into the Fall Richmond race, which Denny Hamlin won, and McMurray finished seventh, narrowly clinching the sixteenth and final Chase spot. Poor finishes at Chicagoland and New Hampshire put him in a must-win situation at Dover. Unfortunately, McMurray's engine exploded midway through the race, ending his Chase hopes.

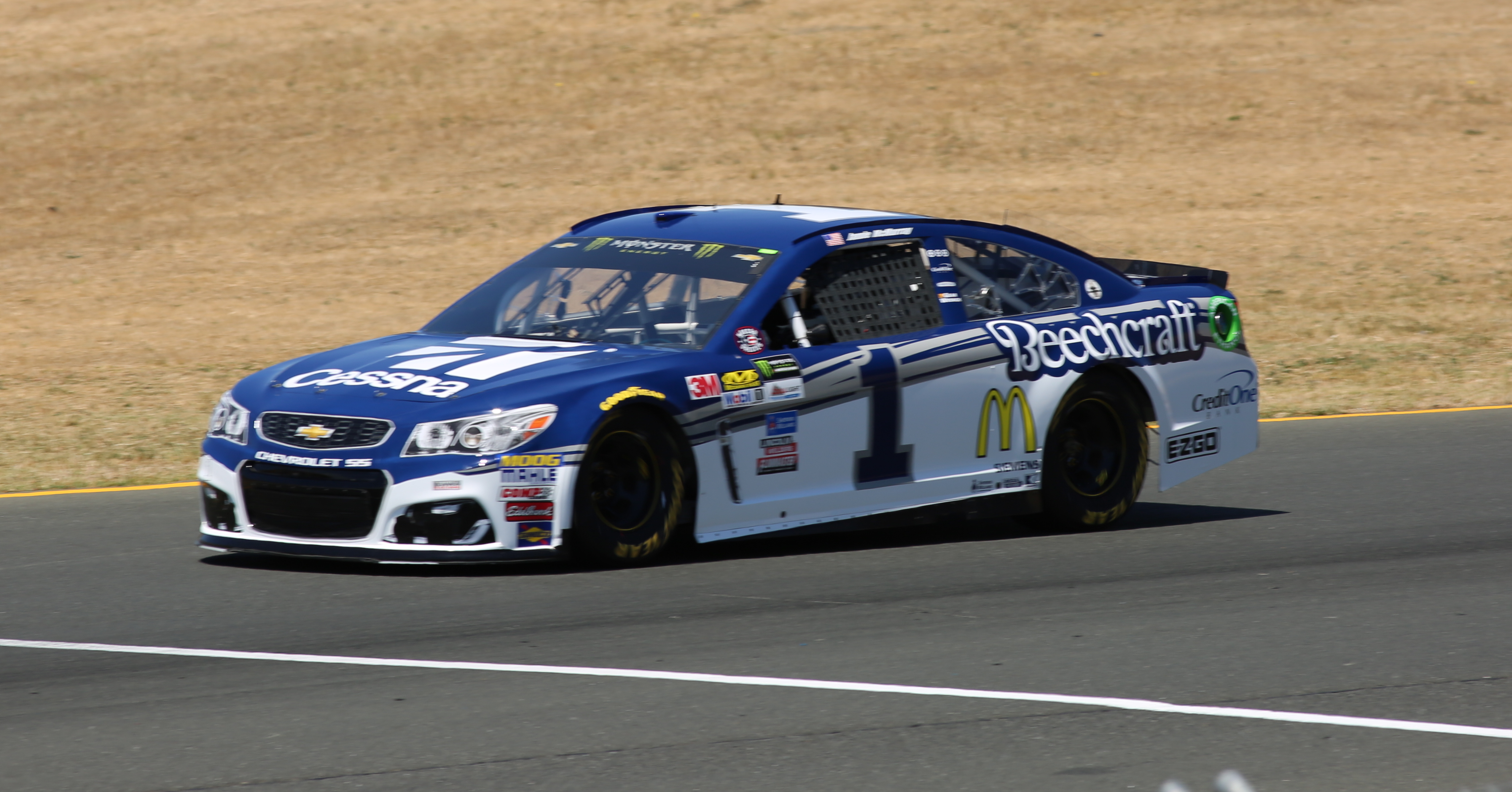
McMurray at the 2017 Toyota/Save Mart 350

McMurray served as a Fox NASCAR analyst for the Xfinity Series race at Las Vegas. McMurray's first top 5 came at the GEICO 500 when he managed to avoid the Big One and finish 2nd to Ricky Stenhouse Jr. in an overtime finish. McMurray jumped up to fifth in the standings after Dover, the highest he had ever been in the standings at the point in the year. McMurray racked up nine top-ten finishes in the first sixteen races of the year, posting another top-five effort at Michigan. McMurray would survive the night race at Daytona to finish fourteenth, ahead of all drivers in front of him in the points with the exception of Jimmie Johnson. At Kentucky, he managed to score his eleventh top-ten of the year. As the regular season ended, McMurray began falling closer to the cut line of the newly renamed Playoffs, though he ultimately managed to clinch a Playoff spot for the third year in a row. McMurray continued to excel, making it past the first round of the Playoffs for the first time in his career. He posted a top-five at Charlotte, before consecutive wrecks caused by Erik Jones at Talladega and Kansas knocked him out. McMurray finished out the year twelfth in the standings and racked up seventeen top tens and three top-fives.

The 2018 season became McMurray's worst since 2011 and 2012, having scored top-fives at the 2018 O'Reilly Auto Parts 500 at Texas in April, and the Charlotte Roval, along with eight top-tens. He also missed the playoffs, finishing twentieth in the points standings. The 2018 season also saw McMurray involved in a seven-flip rollover accident at Talladega Superspeedway during practice for the GEICO 500, leading to NASCAR attempting to reduce speeds for the race by changing the restrictor plates used. At the end of the season, it was announced that Kurt Busch would take over the No. 1 from McMurray after leaving Stewart-Haas Racing.

=== Daytona 500 (2019, 2021) ===
On September 10, 2018, McMurray announced that he would not return to Chip Ganassi Racing in 2019. CGR had offered McMurray a contract to drive at the 2019 Daytona 500 before moving to a leadership position with the team.

McMurray would ultimately retire from full-time Cup Series racing and later signed a contract with Fox Sports to appear on their weekday and raceday NASCAR programs, in addition to his leadership role with Ganassi. In January 2019, Chip Ganassi Racing formed a partnership with Spire Motorsports to field the No. 40 for McMurray at the Daytona 500. McMurray led a few laps in the race but finished 22nd.

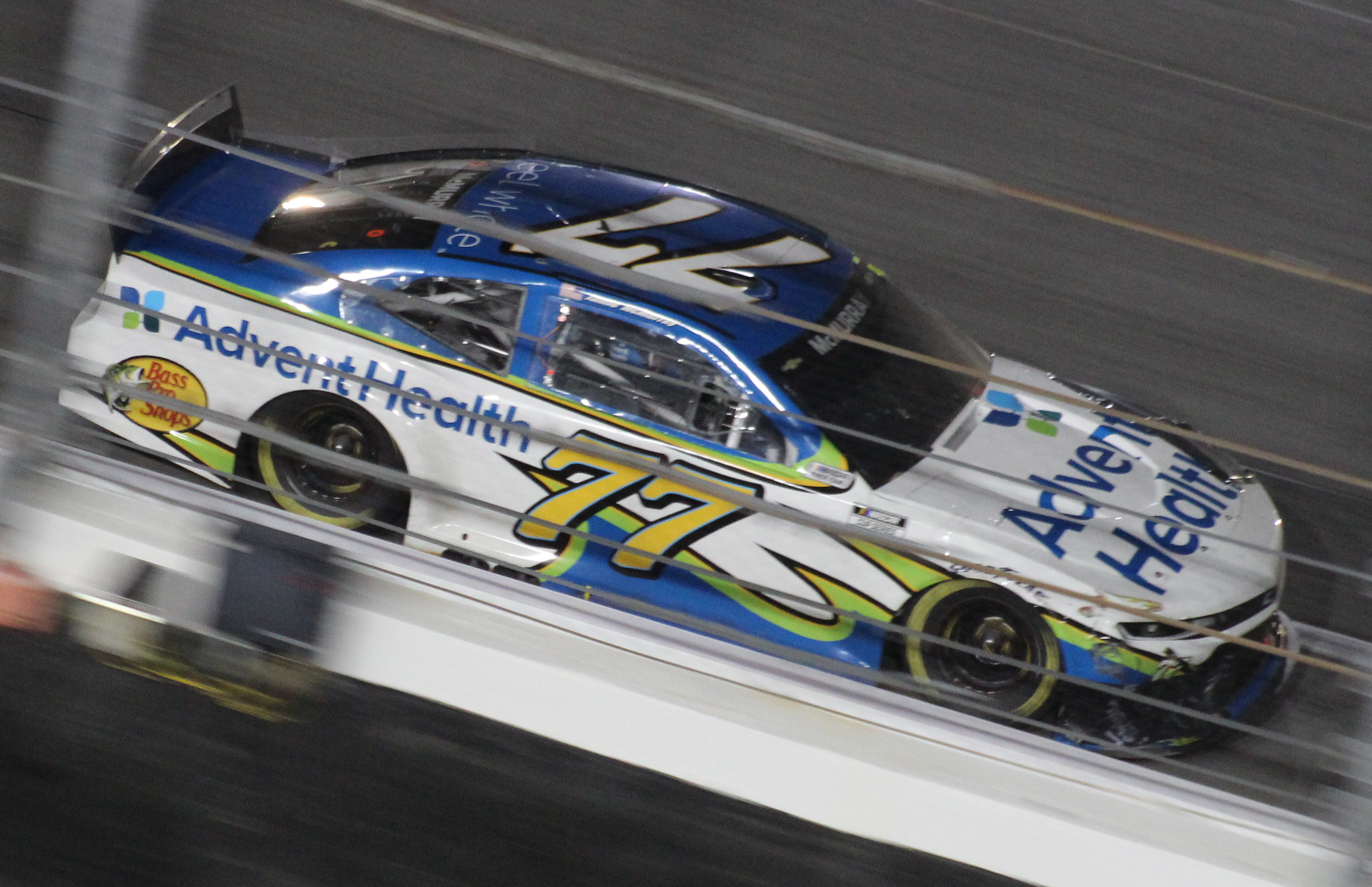
Jamie McMurray racing in the 2021 Daytona 500

He returned to the Daytona 500 in 2021 with Spire, driving the No. 77. He finished eighth after starting nineteenth, in only his second top-ten finish in the Daytona 500.

=== Other racing ===
On January 4, 2014, Chip Ganassi Racing announced that McMurray will run the 24 Hours of Daytona for the team in the No. 01 car alongside Scott Pruett, Memo Rojas and Sage Karam. At the team's announcement, McMurray stated, "It's the most fun race I get to run all year long. There's no points for us and it's all about being able to win. What makes it such a good time, you'll see guys all year long and they'll be here, so you can eat lunch with them, hang out and things like that. It’s fun to be a part of it." McMurray returned to the 24 Hours of Daytona in 2015 in the No. 02 car with Tony Kanaan, Scott Dixon, and Cup teammate Kyle Larson. The team would win the event, and McMurray joined A. J. Foyt and Mario Andretti as the only drivers to win the Daytona 500 and 24 Hours of Daytona (they would be joined by Jeff Gordon two years later). McMurray would also drive for the team in the 2016 24 Hours of Daytona.

== Broadcast career ==
Following his departure from Chip Ganassi Racing at the end of the 2018 season, McMurray signed with Fox Sports to be an analyst for their Fox NASCAR broadcast team starting in 2019. He appeared in the NASCAR RaceDay pre-race show and the NASCAR Race Hub midweek news show. McMurray also joined CW Sports as a color commentator for their NASCAR on The CW broadcast team in 2025.

== Personal life ==
McMurray was born in Joplin, Missouri. He grew up racing go-karts and competed in nearly every form of karting around the country before moving to late model stock cars.

McMurray married Christy Futrell in July 2009. Their first child Carter Scott McMurray was born Thanksgiving morning, November 25, 2010. Their second child, a daughter named Hazel, was born February 11, 2013. Carter currently races full-time in the SMART Modified Tour.

Through his trouble-filled 2009, and his contrasting 2010, McMurray found the power of prayer. Following his win at Charlotte in 2010, McMurray said in his post-race interview, "As those laps were winding down, I was thinking about Daytona and why I cry and the power of prayer. I had a tough year last year. I found out the power of prayer and what that can do for you. When you get to victory lane, and you get to experience this, it just makes you a believer."

Throughout 2017, McMurray has also been actively running and cycling with other drivers. McMurray completed the Assault on Mt. Mitchell on May 5, and on December 12, competed in his first marathon, the Kiawah Island Golf Resort Marathon.

== Motorsports career results ==
=== NASCAR ===
(key) (Bold – Pole position awarded by qualifying time. Italics – Pole position earned by points standings or practice time. * – Most laps led.)

==== Cup Series ====
NASCAR Cup Series results
Year	Team	No.	Make	1	2	3	4	5	6	7	8	9	10	11	12	13	14	15	16	17	18	19	20	21	22	23	24	25	26	27	28	29	30	31	32	33	34	35	36	NCSC	Pts	Ref
2002	Chip Ganassi Racing	40	Dodge	DAY	CAR	LVS	ATL	DAR	BRI	TEX	MAR	TAL	CAL	RCH	CLT	DOV	POC	MCH	SON	DAY	CHI	NHA	POC	IND	GLN	MCH	BRI	DAR	RCH	NHA	DOV	KAN	TAL; 26	CLT; 1*	MAR	ATL; 7	CAR; 15	PHO; 40	HOM; 22	46th	679	
2003	Chip Ganassi Racing	42	Dodge	DAY; 31	CAR; 5	LVS; 32	ATL; 36	DAR; 22	BRI; 11	TEX; 10	TAL; 27	MAR; 39	CAL; 5	RCH; 22	CLT; 25	DOV; 13	POC; 32	MCH; 14	SON; 20	DAY; 37	CHI; 8	NHA; 40	POC; 28	IND; 3	GLN; 22	MCH; 36	BRI; 3	DAR; 4	RCH; 19	NHA; 10	DOV; 6	TAL; 16	KAN; 8	CLT; 7	MAR; 8	ATL; 15	PHO; 12	CAR; 35	**HOM**; 9	13th	3965	
2004	Chip Ganassi Racing	42	Dodge	DAY; 36	CAR; 3	LVS; 4	ATL; 37	DAR; 21	BRI; 8	TEX; 10	MAR; 7	TAL; 9	CAL; 15	RCH; 38	CLT; 4	DOV; 15	POC; 9	MCH; 37	SON; 2	DAY; 37	CHI; 13	NHA; 7	POC; 30	IND; 7	GLN; 13	MCH; 4	BRI; 7	CAL; 4	RCH; 9	NHA; 5	DOV; 8	TAL; 17	KAN; 7	CLT; 8	MAR; 2	ATL; 8	PHO; 24	DAR; 4	HOM; 7	11th	4597	
2005	Chip Ganassi Racing	42	Dodge	DAY; 32	CAL; 4	LVS; 15	ATL; 11	BRI; 24	MAR; 25	TEX; 2	PHO; 25	TAL; 5	DAR; 6	RCH; 10	CLT; 21	DOV; 26	POC; 10	MCH; 13	SON; 13	DAY; 2	CHI; 22	NHA; 40	**POC**; 11	IND; 17	GLN; 13	MCH; 20	BRI; 26	CAL; 8	RCH; 40	NHA; 12	DOV; 29	TAL; 12	KAN; 18	CLT; 31	MAR; 7	ATL; 6	TEX; 11	PHO; 18	HOM; 18	12th	4130	
2006	Roush Racing	26	Ford	DAY; 37	CAL; 6	LVS; 23	ATL; 14	BRI; 35	MAR; 9	TEX; 37	PHO; 14	TAL; 5	RCH; 19	DAR; 42	CLT; 8	DOV; 2*	POC; 18	MCH; 23	SON; 18	DAY; 8	CHI; 39	NHA; 33	POC; 20	IND; 26	GLN; 3	MCH; 17	BRI; 29	CAL; 20	RCH; 25	NHA; 29	DOV; 17	KAN; 42	TAL; 37	CLT; 34	MAR; 19	ATL; 40	TEX; 26	PHO; 40	HOM; 35	25th	3405	
2007	Roush Fenway Racing	26	Ford	DAY; 31	CAL; 37	LVS; 10	ATL; 15	BRI; 9	MAR; 9	TEX; 5	PHO; 23	TAL; 5	RCH; 41	DAR; 16	CLT; 19	DOV; 24	POC; 29	MCH; 8	**SON**; 37	NHA; 16	DAY; 1	CHI; 38	IND; 33	POC; 40	GLN; 34	MCH; 30	BRI; 26	CAL; 16	RCH; 38	NHA; 11	DOV; 8	KAN; 24	TAL; 37	CLT; 24	MAR; 32	ATL; 26	TEX; 9	PHO; 23	HOM; 14	17th	3556	
2008	Roush Fenway Racing	26	Ford	DAY; 26	CAL; 22	LVS; 25	ATL; 40	BRI; 43	MAR; 8	TEX; 14	PHO; 17	TAL; 17	RCH; 35	DAR; 11	CLT; 23	DOV; 10	POC; 20	MCH; 10	SON; 18	NHA; 41	DAY; 32	CHI; 21	IND; 6	POC; 9	GLN; 16	MCH; 10	BRI; 12	CAL; 24	RCH; 29	NHA; 39	DOV; 36	KAN; 17	TAL; 32	CLT; 5	MAR; 38	ATL; 7	TEX; 3	PHO; 3	HOM; 3	16th	3809	
2009	Roush Fenway Racing	26	Ford	DAY; 37	CAL; 16	LVS; 9	ATL; 15	BRI; 37	MAR; 10	TEX; 38	PHO; 11	TAL; 42	RCH; 7	DAR; 22	CLT; 21	DOV; 14	POC; 13	MCH; 11	SON; 14	NHA; 33	DAY; 11	CHI; 22	IND; 21	POC; 20	GLN; 40	MCH; 32	BRI; 11	ATL; 28	RCH; 27	NHA; 18	DOV; 28	KAN; 31	CAL; 36	CLT; 33	MAR; 6	TAL; 1*	TEX; 20	PHO; 19	HOM; 18	22nd	3604	
2010	Earnhardt Ganassi Racing	1	Chevy	DAY; 1	**CAL**; 17	LVS; 34	ATL; 29	BRI; 8	MAR; 30	PHO; 24	TEX; 30	TAL; 2	RCH; 19	**DAR**; 2	DOV; 32	CLT; 2	POC; 36	MCH; 24	SON; 15	NHA; 18	DAY; 39	**CHI**; 5	IND; 1	POC; 22	GLN; 6	MCH; 20	BRI; 3	ATL; 15	RCH; 17	NHA; 3	DOV; 13	KAN; 11	**CAL**; 17	CLT; 1	MAR; 11	TAL; 36	TEX; 16	PHO; 10	HOM; 21	14th	4325	
2011	Earnhardt Ganassi Racing	1	Chevy	DAY; 18	PHO; 35	LVS; 27	BRI; 21	CAL; 23	**MAR**; 7	TEX; 22	TAL; 21	RCH; 18	DAR; 9	DOV; 20	CLT; 37	KAN; 29	POC; 33	MCH; 19	SON; 15	DAY; 22	KEN; 36	NHA; 31	IND; 4	POC; 22	GLN; 17	MCH; 23	BRI; 5	ATL; 16	RCH; 14	CHI; 38	NHA; 23	DOV; 15	KAN; 22	CLT; 27	TAL; 29	MAR; 35	TEX; 36	PHO; 17	HOM; 14	27th	795	
2012	Earnhardt Ganassi Racing	1	Chevy	DAY; 31	PHO; 37	LVS; 8	BRI; 7	CAL; 32	MAR; 20	TEX; 14	KAN; 14	RCH; 14	TAL; 11	DAR; 34	CLT; 21	DOV; 19	POC; 10	MCH; 14	SON; 19	KEN; 15	DAY; 13	NHA; 20	IND; 22	POC; 17	GLN; 39	MCH; 14	BRI; 17	ATL; 24	RCH; 22	CHI; 21	NHA; 26	DOV; 24	TAL; 34*	CLT; 17	KAN; 15	MAR; 17	TEX; 18	PHO; 23	HOM; 20	21st	868	
2013	Earnhardt Ganassi Racing	1	Chevy	DAY; 32	PHO; 22	LVS; 13	BRI; 10	CAL; 19	MAR; 7	TEX; 16	KAN; 7	RCH; 26	TAL; 23	DAR; 16	CLT; 19	DOV; 33	POC; 13	MCH; 33	**SON**; 25	KEN; 2	DAY; 7	NHA; 12	IND; 15	POC; 16	GLN; 11	MCH; 22	BRI; 19	ATL; 11	RCH; 4	CHI; 19	NHA; 5	DOV; 11	KAN; 16	CLT; 19	TAL; 1	MAR; 10	TEX; 31	PHO; 18	HOM; 30	15th	1007	
2014	Chip Ganassi Racing	1	Chevy	DAY; 14	PHO; 10	LVS; 15	BRI; 38	CAL; 6	MAR; 42	TEX; 17	DAR; 16	RCH; 13	TAL; 29	KAN; 39	CLT; 5	DOV; 13	POC; 10	MCH; 12	**SON**; 4	KEN; 37	DAY; 30	NHA; 16	IND; 20	POC; 7	GLN; 14	MCH; 14	BRI; 8*	ATL; 12	RCH; 4	CHI; 9	NHA; 4	DOV; 22	KAN; 25	CLT; 3	TAL; 35	**MAR**; 16	TEX; 5	PHO; 14	HOM; 5	18th	1014	
2015	Chip Ganassi Racing	1	Chevy	DAY; 27	ATL; 40	LVS; 11	PHO; 2	CAL; 21	MAR; 10	TEX; 6	BRI; 14	RCH; 4	TAL; 11	KAN; 13	CLT; 19	DOV; 7	POC; 7	MCH; 7	SON; 11	DAY; 15	KEN; 14	NHA; 26	IND; 17	POC; 15	GLN; 40	MCH; 16	BRI; 11	DAR; 14	RCH; 13	CHI; 16	NHA; 14	DOV; 4	CLT; 12	KAN; 20	TAL; 39	MAR; 2	TEX; 10	PHO; 15	HOM; 13	13th	2295	
2016	Chip Ganassi Racing	1	Chevy	DAY; 17	ATL; 21	LVS; 16	PHO; 16	CAL; 10	MAR; 23	TEX; 13	BRI; 13	RCH; 16	TAL; 4	KAN; 26	DOV; 21	CLT; 19	POC; 17	MCH; 9	SON; 17	DAY; 34	KEN; 7	NHA; 6	IND; 19	POC; 20	GLN; 8	BRI; 8	MCH; 8	DAR; 15	RCH; 7	CHI; 11	NHA; 19	DOV; 40	CLT; 10	KAN; 37	TAL; 19	MAR; 8	TEX; 19	PHO; 11	HOM; 5	13th	2231	
2017	Chip Ganassi Racing	1	Chevy	DAY; 28	ATL; 10	LVS; 8	PHO; 15	CAL; 6	MAR; 38	TEX; 7	BRI; 12	RCH; 6	TAL; 2	KAN; 8	CLT; 12	DOV; 7	POC; 37	MCH; 5	SON; 10	DAY; 14	KEN; 7	NHA; 17	IND; 15	POC; 26	GLN; 14	MCH; 9	BRI; 12	DAR; 10	RCH; 14	CHI; 10	NHA; 16	DOV; 9	CLT; 5	TAL; 37	KAN; 34	MAR; 29	TEX; 18	PHO; 6	HOM; 13	12th	2224	
2018	Chip Ganassi Racing	1	Chevy	DAY; 16	ATL; 19	LVS; 36	PHO; 26	CAL; 17	MAR; 26	TEX; 3	BRI; 19	RCH; 19	TAL; 28	DOV; 16	KAN; 31	CLT; 6	POC; 15	MCH; 10	SON; 37	CHI; 12	DAY; 30	KEN; 17	NHA; 18	POC; 20	GLN; 7	MCH; 21	BRI; 29	DAR; 9	IND; 7	LVS; 35	RCH; 21	ROV; 2	DOV; 18	TAL; 35	KAN; 17	MAR; 16	TEX; 19	PHO; 6	HOM; 18	20th	683	
2019	Spire Motorsports	40	Chevy	DAY; 22	ATL	LVS	PHO	CAL	MAR	TEX	BRI	RCH	TAL	DOV	KAN	CLT	POC	MCH	SON	CHI	DAY	KEN	NHA	POC	GLN	MCH	BRI	DAR	IND	LVS	RCH	ROV	DOV	TAL	KAN	MAR	TEX	PHO	HOM	34th	19	
2021	Spire Motorsports	77	Chevy	DAY; 8	DRC	HOM	LVS	PHO	ATL	BRI	MAR	RCH	TAL	KAN	DAR	DOV	COA	CLT	SON	NSH	POC	POC	ROA	ATL	NHA	GLN	IRC	MCH	DAY	DAR	RCH	BRI	LVS	TAL	ROV	TEX	KAN	MAR	PHO	33rd	30	

===== Daytona 500 =====
Year	Team	Manufacturer	Start	Finish
2003	Chip Ganassi Racing	Dodge	19	31
2004	Chip Ganassi Racing	Dodge	7	36
2005	Chip Ganassi Racing	Dodge	17	32
2006	Roush Racing	Ford	6	37
2007	Roush Fenway Racing	Ford	24	31
2008	Roush Fenway Racing	Ford	38	26
2009	Roush Fenway Racing	Ford	21	37
2010	Earnhardt Ganassi Racing	Chevrolet	13	**1**
2011	Earnhardt Ganassi Racing	Chevrolet	14	18
2012	Earnhardt Ganassi Racing	Chevrolet	19	31
2013	Earnhardt Ganassi Racing	Chevrolet	20	32
2014	Chip Ganassi Racing	Chevrolet	22	14
2015	Chip Ganassi Racing	Chevrolet	15	27
2016	Chip Ganassi Racing	Chevrolet	6	17
2017	Chip Ganassi Racing	Chevrolet	3	28
2018	Chip Ganassi Racing	Chevrolet	19	16
2019	Spire Motorsports	Chevrolet	16	22
2021	Spire Motorsports	Chevrolet	19	8

==== Xfinity Series ====
NASCAR Xfinity Series results
Year	Team	No.	Make	1	2	3	4	5	6	7	8	9	10	11	12	13	14	15	16	17	18	19	20	21	22	23	24	25	26	27	28	29	30	31	32	33	34	35	NXSC	Pts	Ref
2000	Brewco Motorsports	71	Ford	DAY	CAR	LVS	ATL	DAR	BRI	TEX	NSV	TAL	CAL	RCH	NHA	CLT	DOV	SBO	MYB	GLN	MLW	NZH	PPR	GTW	IRP	MCH	BRI	DAR	RCH	DOV	CLT	CAR	MEM; 36	PHO; 34	HOM				91st	116	
2001	Brewco Motorsports	27	Pontiac	DAY; 11								TAL; 29																											16th	3308	
2001	Brewco Motorsports	27	Chevy		CAR; 26	LVS; 20	ATL; 24	DAR; 14	BRI; 25	TEX; 16	NSH; 19		CAL; 37	RCH; 26	NHA; 31	NZH; 10	CLT; 25	DOV; 19	KEN; 10	MLW; 19	GLN; 14	CHI; 20	GTW; 11	PPR; 12	IRP; 10	MCH; 17	BRI; 42	DAR; 23	RCH; 14	DOV; 17	KAN; 19	CLT; 31	MEM; 11	PHO; 33	CAR; 16	HOM; 42			16th	3308	
2002	Brewco Motorsports	27	Pontiac	DAY; 11	CAR; 15						TAL; 27										DAY; 5																		6th	4147	
2002	Brewco Motorsports	27	Chevy			LVS; 29	DAR; 16	BRI; 26	TEX; 19	NSH; 7		CAL; 11	RCH; 9	NHA; 9	NZH; 4	CLT; 16	DOV; 32	NSH; 26	KEN; 6	MLW; 16		CHI; 12	GTW; 8	PPR; 8	IRP; 8	MCH; 12	BRI; 11	DAR; 32	RCH; 2	DOV; 26	KAN; 10	CLT; 41	MEM; 3	ATL; 1	CAR; 1	PHO; 38	HOM; 14		6th	4147	
2003	Phoenix Racing	1	Dodge	DAY; 5	CAR; 1		DAR; 2	BRI; 17	TEX; 14	TAL; 6	NSH	CAL; 6	RCH	GTW	NZH	CLT; 23	DOV	NSH	KEN	MLW	DAY; 3	CHI; 9	NHA; 23	PPR	IRP	MCH; 14	BRI; 12	DAR; 41	RCH	DOV	KAN; 10					CAR; 1	HOM; 20		20th	2478	
2003	Phoenix Racing	1	Chevy			LVS; 33																																	20th	2478	
2003	Braun Racing	40	Dodge																													CLT; 5	MEM	ATL	PHO				20th	2478	
2004	Braun Racing	30	Dodge	DAY	CAR; 1	LVS	DAR	BRI	TEX	NSH	TAL	CAL	GTW																										32nd	1765	
2004	Phoenix Racing	1	Dodge											RCH; 41	NZH	CLT; 2	DOV; 8	NSH	KEN	MLW	DAY	CHI; 27																	32nd	1765	
2004	Rusty Wallace Racing	66	Dodge																				**NHA**; 22	PPR	IRP		BRI; 23	CAL; 5	RCH	DOV	KAN	CLT; 8	MEM	ATL; 36		DAR; 1	HOM; 2		32nd	1765	
2004	Chip Ganassi Racing	41	Dodge																							MCH; 40									PHO; 1				32nd	1765	
2005	Rusty Wallace Racing	64	Dodge	DAY	CAL; 7			ATL; 9	NSH; 11	BRI	TEX; 28	PHO; 36	TAL	DAR; 40	RCH; 33	CLT	DOV; 3	NSH	KEN	MLW	DAY	CHI	NHA; 5	PPR	GTW	IRP	GLN; 26	MCH	BRI; 8	CAL	RCH; 37	DOV	KAN	CLT; 16	MEM		PHO; 18		36th	1584	
2005	Chip Ganassi Racing	42	Dodge			MXC; 33	LVS																													TEX; 42			36th	1584	
2005	Phoenix Racing	09	Dodge																																			HOM; DNQ	36th	1584	
2006	Rusty Wallace Racing	64	Dodge	DAY; 16	CAL; 5	MXC; 10	LVS; 7	ATL; 9	BRI	TEX; 15	NSH	PHO; 10	TAL; 36	RCH	DAR; 3	CLT; 43	DOV	NSH	KEN	MLW	DAY; 11	CHI; 40	NHA; 32	MAR	GTW	IRP	GLN; 3	MCH	BRI; 30	CAL; 17	RCH; 11	DOV; 4	KAN	CLT; 31	MEM	TEX	PHO; 15	HOM	25th	2297	
2007	Brewco Motorsports	37	Ford	DAY; 42	CAL; 15	MXC	LVS; 29				TEX; 17		TAL; 36	RCH; 19	DAR	CLT; 18	DOV; 20	NSH	KEN	MLW	NHA	DAY; 18	CHI; 23	GTW	IRP	CGV	GLN												24th	2331	
2007	Roush Fenway Racing	26	Ford					ATL; 14	BRI	NSH		PHO; 17																MCH; 11	BRI; 9	CAL; 8	RCH; 12	DOV; 40	KAN; 5	CLT; 38	MEM; 7	TEX	PHO; 9	HOM; 19	24th	2331	
2008	Roush Fenway Racing	17	Ford	DAY	CAL; 6	LVS																		**GTW**; 27	IRP	CGV	GLN	MCH	BRI	CAL; 5	RCH	DOV; 8	KAN	**CLT**; 9	MEM	TEX; 35	PHO; 7	HOM; 19	40th	1331	
2008	Roush Fenway Racing	16	Ford				ATL; 13	BRI	NSH	TEX; 5	PHO; 36	MXC	TAL	RCH	DAR	CLT	DOV	NSH	KEN	MLW	NHA	DAY	CHI																40th	1331	
2010	JR Motorsports	88	Chevy	DAY	CAL	LVS	BRI	NSH	PHO	TEX; 6	TAL; 14	RCH; 3	DAR; 3	DOV; 3	CLT; 11	NSH	KEN	ROA	NHA	DAY	CHI; 9	GTW	IRP	IOW	GLN	MCH	BRI	CGV	ATL; 1	RCH	DOV	KAN	CAL	CLT	GTW	TEX	PHO	HOM	38th	1234	
2011	Phoenix Racing	1	Chevy	DAY	PHO	LVS	BRI	CAL	TEX	TAL; 34	NSH	RCH	DAR	DOV	IOW	CLT	CHI	MCH	ROA	DAY; 16	KEN	NHA	NSH	IRP	IOW	GLN	CGV	BRI		RCH; 31									110th	0^{1}	
2011	JR Motorsports	7	Chevy																										ATL; 21		CHI; 7	DOV; 17	KAN	CLT	TEX	PHO	HOM		110th	0^{1}	
2012	Turner Motorsports	30	Chevy	DAY	PHO	LVS	BRI	CAL	TEX	RCH	TAL	DAR	IOW	CLT	DOV	MCH	ROA	KEN	DAY	NHA; 9	CHI	IND	IOW	GLN	CGV	BRI	ATL	RCH	CHI	KEN	DOV	CLT	KAN	TEX	PHO	HOM			122nd	0^{1}	
2013	JR Motorsports	5	Chevy	DAY	PHO	LVS	BRI	CAL	TEX	RCH	TAL	DAR	CLT	DOV	IOW	MCH	ROA	KEN	DAY	NHA	CHI	IND	IOW	GLN	MOH	BRI	ATL	RCH; 10	CHI	KEN	DOV	KAN	CLT	TEX	PHO	HOM			109th	0^{1}	
2018	Chip Ganassi Racing	42	Chevy	DAY	ATL	LVS	PHO; 5	CAL	TEX; 7	BRI	RCH	TAL	DOV	CLT; 31	POC	MCH	IOW	CHI	DAY	KEN	NHA	IOW	GLN	MOH	BRI	ROA	DAR	IND	LVS	RCH	ROV	DOV	KAN	TEX	PHO	HOM			96th	0^{1}	

==== Craftsman Truck Series ====
NASCAR Craftsman Truck Series results
Year	Team	No.	Make	1	2	3	4	5	6	7	8	9	10	11	12	13	14	15	16	17	18	19	20	21	22	23	24	25	NCTC	Pts	Ref
1999	MB Motorsports	26	Ford	HOM	PHO	EVG	MMR	MAR	MEM	PPR	I70; 24	BRI	TEX	PIR	GLN	MLW	NSV	NZH	MCH	NHA	IRP; 24	GTW; 30	HPT	RCH	LVS; 11	LVL	TEX; 28	CAL	42nd	464	
2000	MB Motorsports	26	Ford	DAY; 20	HOM; 22	PHO; 33	MMR; 30	MAR	PIR	GTW; 23	MEM; 20	PPR; 32	EVG	TEX; 14	KEN; 17	GLN	MLW; 31	NHA	NZH										22nd	1679	
2000	TKO Motorsports	41	Dodge																	**MCH**; 6	IRP; 3	**NSV**; 25	CIC; 6	RCH; 32	DOV; 6	TEX	CAL		22nd	1679	
2004	Ultra Motorsports	2	Dodge	DAY	ATL	MAR	MFD	CLT	DOV	TEX	MEM	MLW	KAN	KEN	GTW	MCH	IRP	NSH	BRI	**RCH**; 2	NHA; 28	LVS	CAL	TEX	MAR; 1	PHO	DAR	HOM	44th	444	
2008	Roush Fenway Racing	09	Ford	DAY	CAL	ATL	MAR	KAN	CLT	MFD	DOV	TEX	MCH	MLW	MEM	KEN	IRP	NSH	BRI	GTW	NHA	LVS	TAL	MAR; 18	ATL	TEX	PHO	HOM	81st	109	
2026	Kaulig Racing	25	Ram	DAY	ATL	STP	DAR	CAR	BRI	TEX	GLN	DOV	CLT	NSH	MCH	COR; 34	LRP	NWS	IRP	RCH	NHA	BRI	KAN	CLT	PHO	TAL	MAR	HOM	88th	3	

^{*} Season still in progress
^{1} Ineligible for series points

=== Grand-Am ===
(key) Bold – pole position (overall finish/class finish).

==== Rolex Sports Car Series ====
Grand-Am Rolex Sports Car Series DP results
Year	Team	No.	Chassis	1	2	3	4	5	6	7	8	9	10	11	12	13	14	Pos	Pts	Ref
2005	Chip Ganassi Racing	02	Lexus Riley	DAY (4/4)	HOM	CAL	LGA	CMT	WGL	DAY	BAR	WGL	MOH	PHO	WGL	VIR	MXC	74th	28	
2010	Chip Ganassi Racing	02	BMW Riley	DAY (37/15)	HOM	BAR	VIR	LRP	WGL	MOH	DAY	NJ	WGL	MON	MIL			65th	16	
2011	Chip Ganassi Racing	02	BMW Riley	DAY (2/2)	HOM	BAR	VIR	LRP	WGL	ELK	LGA	NJ	WGL	MON	MOH			41st	16	
2012	Chip Ganassi Racing	02	BMW Riley	DAY (4/4)	BAR	HOM	NJ	BEL	MOH	ELK	WGL	IMS (4/4)	WGL	MON	LGA	LRP		39th	28	
2013	Chip Ganassi Racing	01	BMW Riley	DAY (37/11)	AUS	BAR	ATL	BEL	MOH	WGL	IMS	ELK	KAN	LGA	LRP			63rd	20	

=== Complete WeatherTech SportsCar Championship results ===
(key) (Races in bold indicate pole position) (Races in italics indicate fastest lap)

Year	Team	Class	Make	Engine	1	2	3	4	5	6	7	8	9	10	11	Pos.	Points	Ref
2014	Chip Ganassi Racing	P	Ford EcoBoost Riley DP	Ford Ecoboost 3.5 L V6 Turbo	DAY; 11	SEB	LBH	LGA	DET	WGL	MOS	IMS	ELK	COA	PET	49th	21	
2015	Chip Ganassi Racing	P	Ford EcoBoost Riley DP	Ford Ecoboost 3.5 L V6 Turbo	DAY; 1	SEB	LBH	LAG	DET	WGL	MOS	ROA	COA	PET		23rd	36	
2016	Ford Chip Ganassi Racing	P	Ford EcoBoost Riley DP	Ford Ecoboost 3.5 L V6 Turbo	DAY; 7	SEB	LBH	LAG	DET	WGL	MOS	ROA	COA	PET		29th	25	

==== 24 Hours of Daytona ====
24 Hours of Daytona results
Year	Class	No	Team	Car	Co-drivers	Laps	Position	Class Pos.
2005	DP	02	(United States) Chip Ganassi Racing	Lexus Riley DP	(Sweden) Stefan Johansson (United States) Cort Wagner	698	4	4
2010	DP	02	(United States) Chip Ganassi Racing	BMW Riley DP	(New Zealand) Scott Dixon (Colombia) Juan Pablo Montoya (Scotland) Dario Franchitti	249	37 ^{DNF}	15 ^{DNF}
2011	DP	02	(United States) Chip Ganassi Racing	BMW Riley DP	(New Zealand) Scott Dixon (Colombia) Juan Pablo Montoya (Scotland) Dario Franchitti	721	2	2
2012	DP	02	(United States) Chip Ganassi Racing	BMW Riley DP	(New Zealand) Scott Dixon (Scotland) Dario Franchitti (Colombia) Juan Pablo Montoya	760	4	4
2013	DP	02	(United States) Chip Ganassi Racing	BMW Riley DP	(New Zealand) Scott Dixon (Scotland) Dario Franchitti (United States) Joey Hand	594	37 ^{DNF}	11 ^{DNF}
2014	P	01	(United States) Chip Ganassi Racing	Ford Riley DP	(United States) Scott Pruett (Mexico) Memo Rojas (United States) Sage Karam	610	43 ^{DNF}	11 ^{DNF}
2015	P	02	(United States) Chip Ganassi Racing	Ford Riley DP	(New Zealand) Scott Dixon (Brazil) Tony Kanaan (United States) Kyle Larson	740	1	1
2016	P	02	(United States) Chip Ganassi Racing	Ford Riley DP	(New Zealand) Scott Dixon (Brazil) Tony Kanaan (United States) Kyle Larson	708	13	7

=== SMART Modified Tour ===
SMART Modified Tour results
Year	Car owner	No.	Make	1	2	3	4	5	6	7	8	9	10	11	12	13	SMTC	Pts	Ref
2026	Sadler-Stanley Racing	16VA	N/A	FLO	AND	SBO	DOM	HCY	WKS	FCR; 18	CRW	PUL; 12	CAR	ROU	TRI	NWS	39th	52	

Achievements
Preceded by Matt Kenseth	Daytona 500 Winner; 2010	Succeeded by Trevor Bayne
Preceded by Jimmie Johnson	Brickyard 400 Winner; 2010	Succeeded by Paul Menard
Preceded by Jimmie Johnson	NASCAR Sprint All-Star Race Winner; 2014	Succeeded by Denny Hamlin
Awards
Preceded by Ryan Newman	NASCAR Winston Cup Series Rookie of the Year; 2003	Succeeded by Kasey Kahne
