= 2026 SMART Modified Tour =

American motorsport season

The 2026 SMART Modified Tour was the 22nd season of the SMART Modified Tour. It began with the Zach Brewer Memorial at Florence Motor Speedway on February 28 and ended at North Wilkesboro Speedway on October 17.

Luke Baldwin entered the season as the defending champion. Jake Crum won his first championship in the series.

== Schedule ==
No.	Race title	Track	Date
1	Zach Brewer Memorial	Florence Motor Speedway, Timmonsville, South Carolina	February 28
2	Pace-O-Matic 99	Anderson Motor Speedway, Anderson, South Carolina	March 7
3	Pace-O-Matic King of the Modifieds	South Boston Speedway, South Boston, Virginia	March 21
4	The Flying VA Classic	Dominion Raceway, Thornburg, Virginia	April 4
5	The Hickory Hundred presented by Dale Earnhardt Chevrolet	Hickory Motor Speedway, Hickory, North Carolina	April 11
6	Capital Automotive Group Mod Squad Nationals	Wake County Speedway, Raleigh, North Carolina	April 24
7	Kenny Minter Classic	Franklin County Raceway, Callaway, Virginia	May 29
8	Revolutionary 99	Caraway Speedway, Asheboro, North Carolina	July 4
9	The Radford Race	Pulaski Motorsports Park, Fairlawn, Virginia	August 7
10	The Carteret Clash	Carteret County Speedway, Swansboro, North Carolina	September 5
11	Rumble in Rougemont	Orange County Speedway, Rougemont, North Carolina	September 19
12	Freeman Hoosier 99	Tri-County Motor Speedway, Hudson, North Carolina	October 9
13	Friendly Tire 99	North Wilkesboro Speedway, North Wilkesboro, North Carolina	October 18

== Results and standings ==
=== Races ===
No.	Race	Fastest qualifier	Most laps led	Winning driver
1	Zach Brewer Memorial	Sean McElearney	Brandon Ward	Brandon Ward
2	Pace-O-Matic 99	Luke Baldwin	Danny Bohn	Danny Bohn
3	Pace-O-Matic King of the Modifieds	Carson Loftin	Ron Silk	Ron Silk
4	The Flying VA Classic	Brandon Ward	Carson Loftin	Carson Loftin
5	The Hickory Hundred presented by Dale Earnhardt Chevrolet	Sean McElearney	Brandon Ward	Danny Bohn
6	Capital Automotive Group Mod Squad Nationals	Brandon Ward	Joey Braun	Danny Bohn
7	Kenny Minter Classic	Luke Baldwin	Brandon Ward	Jake Crum
8	Revolutionary 99	Carson Loftin	Carson Loftin	Carson Loftin
9	The Radford Race	N/A	Jake Crum	Jake Crum
10	The Carteret Clash	Carson Loftin	Carson Loftin	Carson Loftin
11	Rumble in Rougemont	Danny Bohn	Cayden Lapcevich	Cayden Lapcevich
12	Freeman Hoosier 99	Carson Loftin	Carson Loftin	Carson Loftin
13	Friendly Tire 99	Justin Bonsignore	Luke Baldwin	Jake Crum

=== Drivers' championship ===
(key) Bold - Pole position awarded by time. Italics - Pole position set by final practice results or rainout. * – Most laps led.

Pos	Driver	FLO	AND	SBO	DOM	HCY	WKS	FCR	CRW	PUL	CAR	ROU	TRI	NWS	Points
1	Jake Crum	10	4	17	18	6	13	1	7	1*	7	9	6	1	638
2	Ryan Newman	5	5	3	11	5	2	4	4	2	6	14	8	2	633
3	Danny Bohn	3	1*	16	17	1	1	5	2	9	3	**22**	5	3	633
4	Brandon Ward	1*	6	31	**9**	2	**18**	2*	20	7	4	4	12	11	616
5	Burt Myers	6	3	22	8	4	6	7	3	16	10	16	7	10	605
SMART Modified Tour playoff cutoff
6	Luke Baldwin	24	**2**	21	13	9	7	**6**	12	4	2	6	3	12*	422
7	Carter McMurray	11	7	25	24	8	4	3	5	5	5	2	4	25	408
8	Joey Coulter	12	19	13	10	7	3	14	18	10	8	10	9	7	393
9	Jack Baldwin	2	11	4	3	13	15	8	27	19	9	5	10	Wth	371
10	William Lambros	14	12	6	5	14	11	13	10	15	18	15	17	31	352
11	Joey Braun	4	8	9	2	21	14*	9	9	13	14		Wth	16	339
12	Sean McElearney	**9**	21	15	25	**3**	19	11	24	8	13	19	25	4	338
13	Carson Loftin		25	**8**	1*				**1****		**1***	23	**1***		268
14	Jimmy Wallace	16	15	29	20		9	19	25	17	19	21	22	26	254
15	Austin McDaniel	13	23	14	21	11	16	17	8				16	19	252
16	Max Handley	15	13	18	15	17	5	12	21						212
17	Jonathan Cash	19	10	DNS	14	15	10	20				8			200
18	Daniel Yates	17	17	Wth	12	19	17		16	Wth	Wth	17	Wth	29	184
19	Slate Myers	7	20	28	19	10	8	Wth			11		Wth		184
20	Cayden Lapcevich		14							3		1*	2		154
21	James Civali							10		11		11	18	23	133
22	Bryce Bailey		24		Wth	23	Wth		19			3	13		123
23	Tom Buzze					16			23			7	15	27	117
24	Jason Tutterow	23	16		16		20	16			Wth				114
25	Carsten DiGiantomasso			7	4					18					94
26	Patrick Emerling			23						6			Wth	6	93
27	Jonathan Brown											12	11	9	91
28	Jonathan Kievman										20	25	24	8	87
29	Carson Haislip						12						14	13	84
30	Jimmy Blewett			27	29					14				15	79
31	John-Michael Shenette	20	18						14						71
32	Chase Robertson					12			17			24			70
33	Kyle Scisco				7				6						69
34	Melissa Fifield					22			15				Wth	22	64
35	Jake Christman			12	6										64
36	Chris Pasteryak	8		10											64
37	Paulie Hartwig III			26					26				Wth	17	57
38	Ethan Truell								11		16				55
39	Jamie McMurray							18		12					52
40	Jeremy Gerstner					18			Wth			13			51
41	Ron Silk			1*											49
42	Justin Bonsignore									20				**14**	48
43	Jason Myers								22		12			Wth	48
44	Kyle Ebersole					20		15							47
45	Conner Jones				22							18	Wth		42
46	Stephen Kopcik			2											39
47	Jacob Perry													5	36
48	Elliott Sadler			5											36
49	Connor Hall		9			DNS									32
50	Blake Barney			11											30
51	Bobby Labonte								13		Wth				28
52	John Holleman IV										15	Wth			26
53	Junior Snow										17				24
54	J. R. Bertuccio													18	23
55	Hermie Sadler	18													23
56	Mike Speeney												19		22
57	Brad Zahensky			19											22
58	Brody Jones													20	21
59	Jaxson Casper											Wth	20		21
60	Ryan Flores											20			21
61	Jayden Harman			20											21
62	Chris Hettinger													21	20
63	Luke Fleming												21	Wth	20
64	Rich Hunter										21				20
65	Tristan Bruce									21					20
66	Jim Gavek	21													20
67	John Smith		22												19
68	Steve Zacharias	22													19
69	Mark Manno												23		18
70	Cory Osland				23										18
71	Kyle Bonsignore												Wth	24	17
72	Trevor Catalano			24											17
73	Mark Stewart				26										15
74	Jack Ely				27										14
75	Bud McIntyre												Wth	28	13
76	Tom Martino Jr.				28										13
77	Craig Young							Wth						30	11
78	Austin Kochenash			30											11
79	Jacob Lutz			DNS											8
	James Blewett				Wth										
Pos	Driver	FLO	AND	SBO	DOM	HCY	WKS	FCR	CRW	PUL	CAR	ROU	TRI	NWS	Points

== See also ==
- 2026 NASCAR Cup Series
- 2026 NASCAR O'Reilly Auto Parts Series
- 2026 NASCAR Craftsman Truck Series
- 2026 ARCA Menards Series
- 2026 ARCA Menards Series East
- 2026 ARCA Menards Series West
- 2026 NASCAR Whelen Modified Tour
- 2026 NASCAR Euro Series
- 2026 NASCAR Canada Series
- 2026 NASCAR Brasil Series
- 2026 CARS Tour
- 2026 ASA STARS National Tour
