= 2003 Budweiser Shootout =

First exhibition stock car race of the 2003 NASCAR Winston Cup Series

Race details
- Race 1 of 2 exhibition races in the 2003 NASCAR Winston Cup Series
- Date: February 8, 2003
- Location: Daytona International Speedway, Daytona Beach, Florida
- Course: Permanent racing facility
- Course length: 2.5 miles (4.023 km)
- Distance: 70 laps, 175 mi (281.635 km)
- Weather: Temperatures of 55.9 °F (13.3 °C); wind speeds of 18.41 mph (29.63 km/h)
- Average speed: 180.827 mph (291.013 km/h)
- Attendance: 75,000

Pole position
Driver	Geoff Bodine	Brett Bodine Racing

Most laps led
Driver	Jeff Gordon	Hendrick Motorsports
- Laps: 31

Winner
No. 8	Dale Earnhardt Jr.	Dale Earnhardt, Inc.

Television in the United States
- Network: Fox Broadcasting Company
- Announcers: Mike Joy, Darrell Waltrip, Larry McReynolds
- Nielsen ratings: 5.4/10 (Final)

The 2003 Budweiser Shootout was the first of two exhibition stock car races of the 2003 NASCAR Winston Cup Series. The 25th Budweiser Shootout, and the first to be held at night to allow for prime time broadcasting, it was held on February 8, 2003, in Daytona Beach, Florida, at Daytona International Speedway, before a crowd of 75,000 spectators. Dale Earnhardt Jr. of Dale Earnhardt, Inc. won the 70-lap race from 19th. Hendrick Motorsports's Jeff Gordon was second, with Roush Racing's Matt Kenseth third. It was Earnhardt's first Budweiser Shootout win, and his first at Daytona International Speedway in the Cup Series since the 2001 Pepsi 400.

Although Geoff Bodine won the pole position by lot, he was immediately passed by Jimmie Johnson into turn one. Kurt Busch led laps five through fifteen before Earnhardt passed him on lap sixteen and kept the lead until the mandatory ten-minute pit stop at the end of lap twenty. Ten laps later, Gordon took the lead, which he held until all drivers made a second pit stop on lap fifty, when Mark Martin took the lead. Gordon regained the lead on lap 56, which he held until Earnhardt passed him 10 laps later. Earnhardt won the race by keeping the lead for the final four laps. No yellow flag cautions were issued during the race, which had 13 lead changes among 7 different drivers.

== Background ==
A track layout map of Daytona International Speedway, where the race was held.

The 2003 Budweiser Shootout was the first of two non-points scoring exhibition stock car races of the 2003 NASCAR Winston Cup Series, the 25th edition of the event, and the first time it was held at night, to enable a prime time broadcast. It was held on February 8, 2003, in Daytona Beach, Florida at Daytona International Speedway, a superspeedway that holds NASCAR races. Its standard track is a four-turn, 2.5-mile (4.0-kilometre) superspeedway. Daytona's turns are banked at 31 degrees, and the front stretch (the location of the finish line) is banked at 18 degrees.

The Budweiser Shootout was created by Busch Beer brand manager Monty Roberts as the Busch Clash in 1979. The race, designed to promote Busch Beer, invites the fastest NASCAR drivers from the previous season to compete, and is considered a "warm-up" for the Daytona 500. It was renamed the Bud Shootout in 1998. The name changed to the Budweiser Shootout in 2001, the Sprint Unlimited in 2013 and the Advance Auto Parts Clash in 2017.

The race was open to 19 drivers, including the 15 pole position winners from the 2002 season and four previous shootout winners. Races where qualifying was cancelled due to rain or where the points leader started from the pole position did not count. Tony Stewart was the race's defending champion. The race was 70 laps long, with two segments of 20 and 50 laps separated by a ten-minute pit stop. Teams could change tires, add fuel, and make normal chassis tweaks during the pit stop, but not springs, shock absorbers or rear ends. If the race was stopped, pit crews could work on their vehicles in the garage or on the pit road. Yellow caution and green-flag laps were scored, and the second segment would be extended beyond 50 laps if necessary. Every rolling restart had cars alongside each other in pairs, and all lapped competitors had to move to the rear of the field.

In other changes, NASCAR mandated all cars to run a 13.6-US-gallon (51 L; 11.3 imp gal) fuel cell from the standard 22-US-gallon (83 L; 18 imp gal) cells to try to have an additional pit stop and prevent multi-car accidents. The smaller fuel cells required teams to make an extra pit stop in the second segment. Furthermore, all teams were mandated to use a new car package, which underwent 18 changes to remove several aerodynamic differences (such as the rear spoiler and deck lid) between each of the four types Cup Series car to offer parity throughout the field. The redesigned car package's body design was uniform in the center, but the front and rear were reshaped slightly.

== Practice and qualification ==
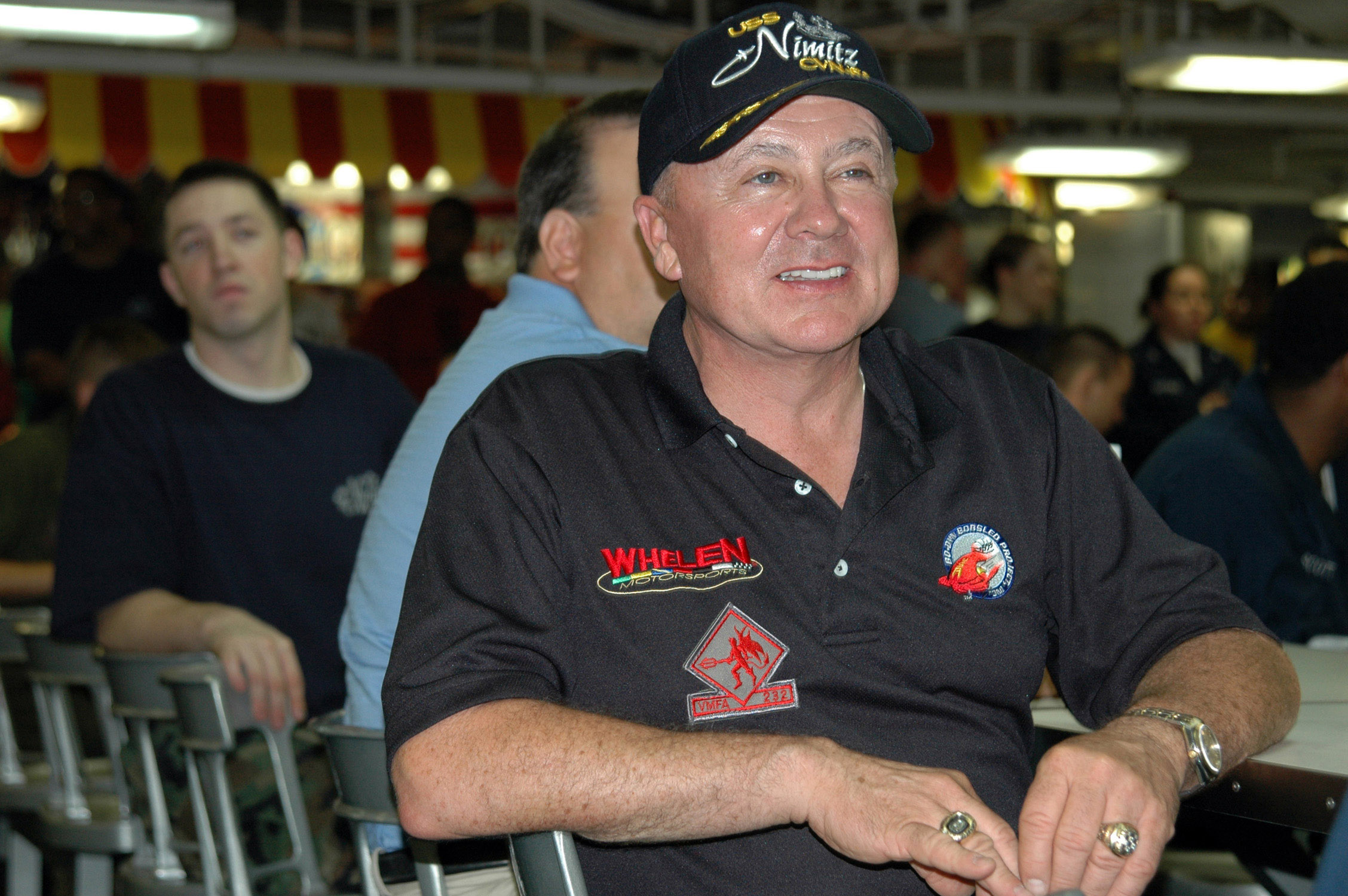
Geoff Bodine (pictured in 2007) picked the pole position for Brett Bodine Racing.

Two practice sessions were held on Friday before the race. The first session lasted for 55 minutes, and the second 60 minutes. Ryan Newman lapped fastest in the first practice session with a time of 48.330 seconds, ahead of Jeff Gordon, Stewart, Terry Labonte, Dale Earnhardt Jr., Kurt Busch, Jimmie Johnson, Bill Elliott, Matt Kenseth, and Ricky Rudd in positions second through tenth. Labonte ran faster in the final practice session, setting a lap of 47.787 seconds to pace the field; Earnhardt was second, and Stewart duplicated his first practice session result in third place. Mark Martin, Ward Burton, Kenseth, Kevin Harvick, Dale Jarrett, Ken Schrader, and Gordon completed the top ten quickest competitors.

For qualifying, the 19 entered drivers chose their starting positions by lot, a feature unique to the event. Geoff Bodine drew the pole position, with Johnson, Busch, Rudd and Kenseth in second through fifth. Ricky Craven drew sixth place, and Jarrett, Todd Bodine, Martin, and Burton selected positions seven, eight, nine and ten. Schrader, Stewart, Elliott, Rusty Wallace, Newman, Harvick, Labonte and Gordon drew the following eight placings. Earnhardt chose the race's 19th and final starting position. Once the lot was completed, Bodine said, "This is what's called brotherly love and I'm happy to be able to help Brett out. It's a tune up for Brett to get ready for the 125s (qualifying races) and the Daytona 500. I love my brothers Brett and Todd. When we put our helmets on it gets a little heated, but this is going to be a lot of fun."

=== Qualifying results ===
Grid	No.	Driver	Team	Manufacturer
1	11	Geoff Bodine	Brett Bodine Racing	Ford
2	48	Jimmie Johnson	Hendrick Motorsports	Chevrolet
3	97	Kurt Busch	Roush Racing	Ford
4	21	Ricky Rudd	Wood Brothers Racing	Ford
5	17	Matt Kenseth	Roush Racing	Ford
6	32	Ricky Craven	PPI Motorsports	Pontiac
7	88	Dale Jarrett	Robert Yates Racing	Ford
8	54	Todd Bodine	BelCar Racing	Ford
9	6	Mark Martin	Roush Racing	Ford
10	22	Ward Burton	Bill Davis Racing	Dodge
11	49	Ken Schrader	BAM Racing	Dodge
12	20	Tony Stewart	Joe Gibbs Racing	Chevrolet
13	9	Bill Elliott	Evernham Motorsports	Dodge
14	2	Rusty Wallace	Penske Racing South	Dodge
15	12	Ryan Newman	Penske Racing South	Dodge
16	29	Kevin Harvick	Richard Childress Racing	Chevrolet
17	5	Terry Labonte	Hendrick Motorsports	Chevrolet
18	24	Jeff Gordon	Hendrick Motorsports	Chevrolet
19	8	Dale Earnhardt Jr.	Dale Earnhardt, Inc.	Chevrolet

== Race ==
The 70-lap race commenced at 8:00 p.m. Eastern Standard Time (UTC−05:00), and was broadcast live in the United States on Fox. Commentary was provided by play-by-play announcer Mike Joy, with analysis from three-time Cup Series champion Darrell Waltrip, and former crew chief Larry McReynolds. Around the start of the race, weather conditions were clear with the air temperature at 52 °F (11 °C); a 60 percent chance of rain was forecast though none fell on the circuit. Hal Marchman, pastor of Central Baptist Church in Daytona Beach, began pre-race ceremonies with an invocation. Country music group SHeDAISY performed the national anthem, and actress and model Susan Ward commanded the drivers to start their engines. No driver moved to the rear of the field during the pace laps.

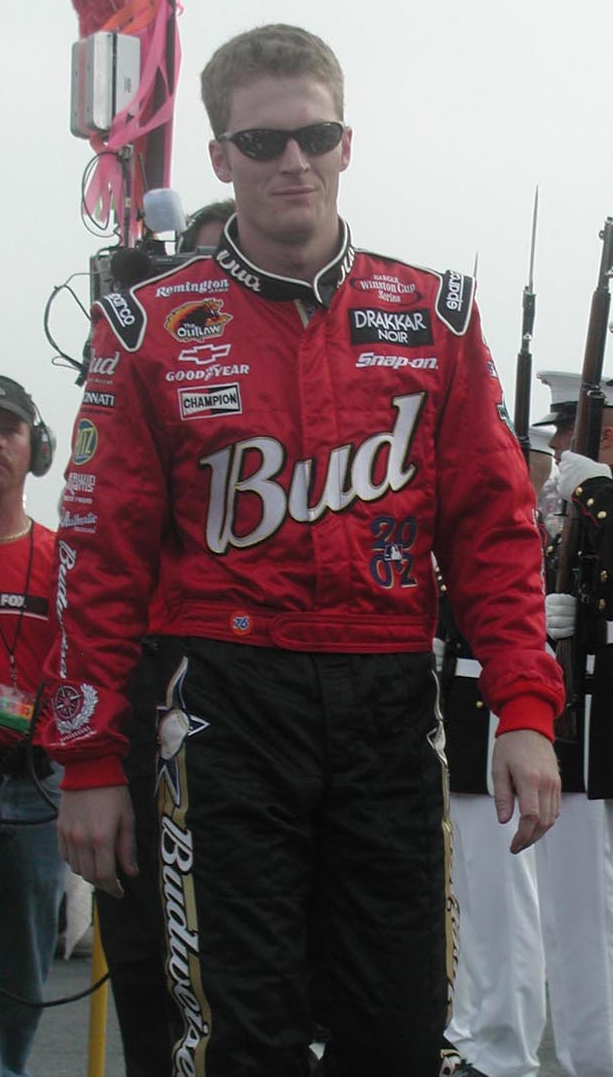
Dale Earnhardt Jr. (pictured in 2002) claimed his first Budweiser Shootout victory and his third at Daytona International Speedway.

At the start, Bodine was passed by Johnson entering turn one. He felt a tire rubbing against the car's bodywork on lap three. Bodine entered the garage on that lap, where suspension damage was discovered, necessitating his retirement from the race on lap four. Every driver was separated by seven-tenths of a second after the first four laps. Johnson lost the lead to Busch on lap five. Busch led the next ten laps until Earnhardt overtook him in turn three to lead the sixteenth lap. During the three-abreast racing, Wallace's left-rear tire lost pressure and burst two laps later, slowing him. He remained on the lead lap, because the ten-minute pit stops for tires, fuel and car adjustments followed soon after on lap twenty. At this point, Earnhardt led Busch, Johnson, Gordon and Kenseth. Earnhardt told his crew chief Tony Eury Sr. he wanted fuel, tires and no chassis adjustments because he felt comfortable with his car.

Once green flag racing resumed, Kenseth overtook Earnhardt on the outside for the lead on lap 22. Both drivers exchanged first place over the next seven laps, until Gordon executed a bump and run technique on Kenseth in the first turn for the lead on lap thirty. On lap fifty, every driver made a second pit stop. Most drivers had two tires installed to their cars, though Johnson's pit crew replaced all four of his tires. Martin, Schrader, Todd Bodine and Rudd made fuel stops; after all the pit stops were completed, Martin took the lead on lap 52, as varying team strategies changed the running order. Martin led the next four laps before Gordon passed him to return to the lead. Earnhardt moved to 5th by the 59th lap, before advancing to 3rd soon after. Earnhardt steered left on lap 64 to try a pass on Gordon for the lead, but was unable to complete it since there were no car to provide drafting assistance, leading Gordon to believe the inside was the best position to race in.

Earnhardt signaled to Newman two laps later that he needed drafting assistance. Newman clung onto Earnhardt's back bumper panel, moving the latter past Gordon on the outside lane at turn three for the lead. Gordon could not respond to Earnhardt in the final four laps, as the remainder of the field went two abreast behind him. Earnhardt held off Gordon and Kenseth to win from last on the grid. It was Earnhardt's maiden Budweiser Shootout victory, and his first at Daytona International Speedway in the Cup Series since the 2001 Pepsi 400. Gordon finished second, Kenseth third, Newman fourth, and Burton fifth. Schrader was in second in the final seven laps as a tailwind increased his top speed, but fell to sixth after a failed overtake to Earnhardt's outside. Johnson, Rudd, Harvick, and Craven completed the top ten finishers. The first 15 drivers finished within a second of one other. No yellow caution flags were issued since no driver had an accident or collided with another car, and there were 13 lead changes among 7 different participants. Gordon's 31 laps led was the most of any competitor. Earnhardt led 4 times for 13 laps.

=== After the race ===
Earnhardt appeared in victory lane to celebrate his third victory at Daytona International Speedway. He earned $205,000 for the victory, and performed donuts in the infield grass in front of a crowd of 75,000 people. Earnhardt was unsure as to how he won the race, "There was so much happening the last two laps and there's so much going on in your mind. You're trying to watch who is running up on the top and who is running on the bottom and you're trying to get help from those guys and get pushes. But I stayed out front. That's a tough win." Gordon said of his second-place finish, "When Junior got up there, I didn't think he had enough momentum. Then everyone started battling for second and third and it got real crazy out there. After that, it was everyone getting what they could. He's so good at these restrictor plate races." Third-placed Kenseth said that the night was instrumental in determining the race's outcome because the track temperatures were lower than during the day, "Being at night, all three lanes had grip. It was intense for us and good for the fans."

Drivers were pleased with the updated car package. Wallace observed that competitors could draft efficiently and that drivers could not pull away from each other, "My car handled pretty good the whole entire run. The cars, aerodynamically, stuck pretty tight. I feel real good about it." Harvick compared the on-track action to the early races, when cars had roof flaps added on top to lower top speeds, and he disclosed there was a negligible difference in car handling, "That was pretty wild racing to tell you the truth. (The cars) suck up really good. You could pass, you could push, you could shove. They get a lot better run than the other cars used to for some reason." Kenseth felt that the package prevented 95 percent of possible illegal spoiler modifications for the Daytona races, "Everybody used to roll the spoilers down as much as they could, everybody would cheat the templates as much as they could." Craven said of the driving observed in the event, "It was like a 2½-mile Martinsville. It was perfect." The race took 58 minutes and 4 seconds to complete, and the margin of victory was 0.180 seconds.

=== Race results ===
Pos.	Grid	No.	Driver	Team	Manufacturer	Laps
1	19	8	Dale Earnhardt Jr.	Dale Earnhardt, Inc.	Chevrolet	70
2	18	24	Jeff Gordon	Hendrick Motorsports	Chevrolet	70
3	5	17	Matt Kenseth	Roush Racing	Ford	70
4	15	12	Ryan Newman	Penske Racing South	Dodge	70
5	10	22	Ward Burton	Bill Davis Racing	Dodge	70
6	11	49	Ken Schrader	BAM Racing	Dodge	70
7	2	48	Jimmie Johnson	Hendrick Motorsports	Chevrolet	70
8	4	21	Ricky Rudd	Wood Brothers Racing	Ford	70
9	16	29	Kevin Harvick	Richard Childress Racing	Chevrolet	70
10	6	32	Ricky Craven	PPI Motorsports	Pontiac	70
11	3	97	Kurt Busch	Roush Racing	Ford	70
12	14	2	Rusty Wallace	Penske Racing South	Dodge	70
13	8	54	Todd Bodine	BelCar Racing	Ford	70
14	17	5	Terry Labonte	Hendrick Motorsports	Chevrolet	70
15	12	20	Tony Stewart	Joe Gibbs Racing	Chevrolet	70
16	13	9	Bill Elliott	Evernham Motorsports	Dodge	70
17	9	6	Mark Martin	Roush Racing	Ford	70
18	7	88	Dale Jarrett	Robert Yates Racing	Ford	70
19	1	11	Geoff Bodine	Brett Bodine Racing	Ford	3

Previous race: 2002 Ford 400	NASCAR Winston Cup Series; 2003 season	Next race: 2003 Gatorade 125s (exhibition); 2003 Daytona 500 (points)
