= 2002 Ford 400 =

Race details
- Race 36 of 36 in the 2002 NASCAR Winston Cup Series season
- Date: November 17, 2002
- Location: Homestead–Miami Speedway, Homestead, Florida
- Course: Permanent racing facility
- Course length: 1.5 miles (2.4 km)
- Distance: 267 laps, 400.5 mi (644.52 km)
- Weather: Temperatures averaging about 70.2 °F (21.2 °C); wind speeds reaching up to 21.8 miles per hour (35.1 km/h)
- Average speed: 116.462 miles per hour (187.427 km/h)

Pole position
Driver	Kurt Busch	Roush Racing

Most laps led
Driver	Joe Nemechek	Hendrick Motorsports
- Laps: 111

Winner
No. 97	Kurt Busch	Roush Racing

Television in the United States
- Network: NBC
- Announcers: Allen Bestwick, Benny Parsons, & Wally Dallenbach Jr.

The 2002 Ford 400 was a NASCAR Winston Cup Series race held on November 17, 2002, at Homestead–Miami Speedway in Homestead, Florida. Contested over 267 laps on the 1.5 mile (2.4 km) speedway, it was the 36th and final race of the 2002 NASCAR Winston Cup Series season. Kurt Busch of Roush Racing won the race and Tony Stewart of Joe Gibbs Racing won the championship.

== Summary ==
Starting in 2002 season, the final race was held at Homestead–Miami Speedway. In the final race on the old configuration, Kurt Busch drove to his 4th win in a rain-delayed event, and Tony Stewart would win his 1st career championship.

== Top 10 results ==
Pos	No.	Driver	Team	Manufacturer
1	97	Kurt Busch	Roush Racing	Ford
2	25	Joe Nemechek	Hendrick Motorsports	Chevrolet
3	99	Jeff Burton	Roush Racing	Ford
4	6	Mark Martin	Roush Racing	Ford
5	24	Jeff Gordon	Hendrick Motorsports	Chevrolet
6	12	Ryan Newman	Penske Racing	Ford
7	9	Bill Elliott	Evernham Motorsports	Dodge
8	48	Jimmie Johnson	Hendrick Motorsports	Chevrolet
9	21	Elliott Sadler	Wood Brothers Racing	Ford
10	55	Bobby Hamilton	Andy Petree Racing	Chevrolet

Previous race: 2002 Checker Auto Parts 500	NASCAR Winston Cup Series; 2002 season	Next race: 2003 Budweiser Shootout (exhibition); 2003 Daytona 500 (points)
