= 2002 NAPA 500 =

33rd race of the 2002 NASCAR Winston Cup Series

Race details
- Race 33 of 36 in the 2002 NASCAR Winston Cup Series
- The 2002 NAPA 500 program cover.
- Date: October 27, 2002
- Official name: 43rd Annual NAPA 500
- Location: Hampton, Georgia, Atlanta Motor Speedway
- Course: Permanent racing facility
- Course length: 1.54 miles (2.48 km)
- Distance: 248 laps, 381.92 mi (614.64 km)
- Scheduled distance: 325 laps, 500.5 mi (805.476 km)
- Average speed: 127.519 miles per hour (205.222 km/h)
- Attendance: 110,000

Pole position
Driver	Tony Stewart	Joe Gibbs Racing
- Time: Set by 2002 owner's points

Most laps led
Driver	Kurt Busch	Roush Racing
- Laps: 84

Winner
No. 97	Kurt Busch	Roush Racing

Television in the United States
- Network: NBC
- Announcers: Allen Bestwick, Benny Parsons, Wally Dallenbach Jr.

Radio in the United States
- Radio: Performance Racing Network

The 2002 NAPA 500 was the 33rd stock car race of the 2002 NASCAR Winston Cup Series and the 43rd iteration of the event. The race was held on Sunday, October 27, 2002, before a crowd of 110,000 in Hampton, Georgia at Atlanta Motor Speedway, a 1.54 miles (2.48 km) permanent asphalt quad-oval intermediate speedway. The race was shortened from its scheduled 325 laps to 248 due to inclement weather during the race. At race's end, Kurt Busch, driving for Roush Racing, would lead the race when the race was put under caution on lap 242, with the race eventually being called six laps later. The win was Busch's third career NASCAR Winston Cup Series win and his third of the season. To fill out the podium, Joe Nemechek of Hendrick Motorsports and Dale Jarrett of Robert Yates Racing would finish second and third, respectively.

== Background ==
The layout of Atlanta Motor Speedway, the venue where the race was held.

Atlanta Motor Speedway is a track in Hampton, Georgia. It is a 1.5 mi (2.4 km) quad-oval track with a seating capacity of 111,000. It opened in 1960 as a 1.5 mi (2.4 km) standard oval. In 1994, 46 condominiums were built over the northeastern side of the track. In 1997, to standardize the track with Speedway Motorsports' other two 1.5 mi (2.4 km) ovals, the entire track was almost completely rebuilt. The frontstretch and backstretch were swapped, and the configuration of the track was changed from oval to quad-oval. The project made the track one of the fastest on the NASCAR circuit.

=== Entry list ===
- (R) denotes rookie driver.

#	Driver	Team	Make
00	Buckshot Jones	Michael Waltrip Racing	Chevrolet
1	Steve Park	Dale Earnhardt, Inc.	Chevrolet
2	Rusty Wallace	Penske Racing	Ford
4	Mike Skinner	Morgan–McClure Motorsports	Chevrolet
5	Terry Labonte	Hendrick Motorsports	Chevrolet
6	Mark Martin	Roush Racing	Ford
7	Casey Atwood	Ultra-Evernham Motorsports	Dodge
8	Dale Earnhardt Jr.	Dale Earnhardt, Inc.	Chevrolet
9	Bill Elliott	Evernham Motorsports	Dodge
09	Geoff Bodine	Phoenix Racing	Ford
10	Johnny Benson Jr.	MBV Motorsports	Pontiac
11	Brett Bodine	Brett Bodine Racing	Ford
12	Ryan Newman (R)	Penske Racing	Ford
14	Mike Wallace	A. J. Foyt Enterprises	Pontiac
15	Michael Waltrip	Dale Earnhardt, Inc.	Chevrolet
16	Greg Biffle	Roush Racing	Ford
17	Matt Kenseth	Roush Racing	Ford
18	Bobby Labonte	Joe Gibbs Racing	Pontiac
19	Jeremy Mayfield	Evernham Motorsports	Dodge
20	Tony Stewart	Joe Gibbs Racing	Pontiac
21	Elliott Sadler	Wood Brothers Racing	Ford
22	Ward Burton	Bill Davis Racing	Dodge
23	Kenny Wallace	Bill Davis Racing	Dodge
24	Jeff Gordon	Hendrick Motorsports	Chevrolet
25	Joe Nemechek	Hendrick Motorsports	Chevrolet
26	Todd Bodine	Haas-Carter Motorsports	Ford
27	Scott Wimmer	Bill Davis Racing	Dodge
28	Ricky Rudd	Robert Yates Racing	Ford
29	Kevin Harvick	Richard Childress Racing	Chevrolet
30	Jeff Green	Richard Childress Racing	Chevrolet
31	Robby Gordon	Richard Childress Racing	Chevrolet
32	Ricky Craven	PPI Motorsports	Ford
36	Ken Schrader	MB2 Motorsports	Pontiac
40	Jamie McMurray	Chip Ganassi Racing	Dodge
41	Jimmy Spencer	Chip Ganassi Racing	Dodge
43	John Andretti	Petty Enterprises	Dodge
44	Ted Musgrave	Petty Enterprises	Dodge
45	Kyle Petty	Petty Enterprises	Dodge
48	Jimmie Johnson (R)	Hendrick Motorsports	Chevrolet
49	Derrike Cope	BAM Racing	Dodge
54	Ron Hornaday Jr.	BH Motorsports	Chevrolet
55	Bobby Hamilton	Andy Petree Racing	Chevrolet
59	Carl Long (R)	Price Motorsports	Dodge
60	Jack Sprague	Haas CNC Racing	Chevrolet
66	Frank Kimmel	Haas-Carter Motorsports	Ford
74	Tony Raines	BACE Motorsports	Chevrolet
77	Dave Blaney	Jasper Motorsports	Ford
83	Kerry Earnhardt	FitzBradshaw Racing	Chevrolet
88	Dale Jarrett	Robert Yates Racing	Ford
97	Kurt Busch	Roush Racing	Ford
99	Jeff Burton	Roush Racing	Ford
Official entry list

== Practice ==
=== First practice ===
The first practice session was held on Friday, October 25, at 3:20 PM EST, and would last for 2 hours. Bill Elliott of Evernham Motorsports would set the fastest time in the session, with a lap of 29.033 and an average speed of 190.955 mph (307.312 km/h).

Pos.	#	Driver	Team	Make	Time	Speed
1	9	Bill Elliott	Evernham Motorsports	Dodge	29.033	190.955
2	20	Tony Stewart	Joe Gibbs Racing	Pontiac	29.123	190.365
3	88	Dale Jarrett	Robert Yates Racing	Ford	29.147	190.208
Full first practice results

=== Second practice ===
The second practice session was held on Saturday, October 26, at 9:30 AM EST, and would last for 45 minutes. Jeff Gordon of Hendrick Motorsports would set the fastest time in the session, with a lap of 29.617 and an average speed of 187.190 mph (301.253 km/h).

Pos.	#	Driver	Team	Make	Time	Speed
1	24	Jeff Gordon	Hendrick Motorsports	Chevrolet	29.617	187.190
2	20	Tony Stewart	Joe Gibbs Racing	Pontiac	29.620	187.171
3	48	Jimmie Johnson (R)	Hendrick Motorsports	Chevrolet	29.738	186.428
Full second practice results

=== Final practice ===
The final practice session was held on Saturday, October 26, at 11:15 AM EST, and would last for 45 minutes. Tony Stewart of Joe Gibbs Racing would set the fastest time in the session, with a lap of 29.880 and an average speed of 185.542 mph (298.601 km/h).

Pos.	#	Driver	Team	Make	Time	Speed
1	20	Tony Stewart	Joe Gibbs Racing	Pontiac	29.880	185.542
2	8	Dale Earnhardt Jr.	Dale Earnhardt, Inc.	Chevrolet	29.911	185.350
3	88	Dale Jarrett	Robert Yates Racing	Ford	29.944	185.146
Full Happy Hour practice results

== Qualifying ==
Qualifying was scheduled to be held on Friday, October 25, at 7:05 PM EST. However, rain would force the cancellation of qualifying. As a result, the starting lineup would be based on the current 2002 owner's points. Due to this, Joe Gibbs Racing driver Tony Stewart would win the pole.

Eight drivers would fail to qualify: Geoff Bodine, Frank Kimmel, Scott Wimmer, Greg Biffle, Buckshot Jones, Jack Sprague, Kerry Earnhardt, and Ron Hornaday Jr.

=== Full qualifying results ===
Pos.	#	Driver	Team	Make
1	20	Tony Stewart	Joe Gibbs Racing	Pontiac
2	48	Jimmie Johnson (R)	Hendrick Motorsports	Chevrolet
3	6	Mark Martin	Roush Racing	Ford
4	40	Jamie McMurray	Chip Ganassi Racing	Dodge
5	2	Rusty Wallace	Penske Racing	Ford
6	12	Ryan Newman (R)	Penske Racing	Ford
7	24	Jeff Gordon	Hendrick Motorsports	Chevrolet
8	97	Kurt Busch	Roush Racing	Ford
9	17	Matt Kenseth	Roush Racing	Ford
10	28	Ricky Rudd	Robert Yates Racing	Ford
11	88	Dale Jarrett	Robert Yates Racing	Ford
12	9	Bill Elliott	Evernham Motorsports	Dodge
13	8	Dale Earnhardt Jr.	Dale Earnhardt, Inc.	Chevrolet
14	99	Jeff Burton	Roush Racing	Ford
15	15	Michael Waltrip	Dale Earnhardt, Inc.	Chevrolet
16	32	Ricky Craven	PPI Motorsports	Ford
17	18	Bobby Labonte	Joe Gibbs Racing	Pontiac
18	30	Jeff Green	Richard Childress Racing	Chevrolet
19	77	Dave Blaney	Jasper Motorsports	Ford
20	31	Robby Gordon	Richard Childress Racing	Chevrolet
21	29	Kevin Harvick	Richard Childress Racing	Chevrolet
22	45	Kyle Petty	Petty Enterprises	Dodge
23	5	Terry Labonte	Hendrick Motorsports	Chevrolet
24	41	Jimmy Spencer	Chip Ganassi Racing	Dodge
25	10	Johnny Benson Jr.	MBV Motorsports	Pontiac
26	19	Jeremy Mayfield	Evernham Motorsports	Dodge
27	22	Ward Burton	Bill Davis Racing	Dodge
28	21	Elliott Sadler	Wood Brothers Racing	Ford
29	55	Bobby Hamilton	Andy Petree Racing	Chevrolet
30	43	John Andretti	Petty Enterprises	Dodge
31	36	Ken Schrader	MB2 Motorsports	Pontiac
32	23	Kenny Wallace	Bill Davis Racing	Dodge
33	1	Steve Park	Dale Earnhardt, Inc.	Chevrolet
34	26	Todd Bodine	Haas-Carter Motorsports	Ford
35	4	Mike Skinner	Morgan–McClure Motorsports	Chevrolet
36	25	Joe Nemechek	Hendrick Motorsports	Chevrolet
37	14	Mike Wallace	A. J. Foyt Enterprises	Pontiac
38	7	Casey Atwood	Ultra-Evernham Motorsports	Dodge
39	44	Ted Musgrave	Petty Enterprises	Dodge
40	11	Brett Bodine	Brett Bodine Racing	Ford
41	49	Derrike Cope	BAM Racing	Dodge
42	74	Tony Raines	BACE Motorsports	Chevrolet
43	59	Carl Long (R)	Price Motorsports	Dodge
Failed to qualify
44	09	Geoff Bodine	Phoenix Racing	Ford
45	66	Frank Kimmel	Haas-Carter Motorsports	Ford
46	27	Scott Wimmer	Bill Davis Racing	Dodge
47	16	Greg Biffle	Roush Racing	Ford
48	00	Buckshot Jones	Michael Waltrip Racing	Chevrolet
49	60	Jack Sprague	Haas CNC Racing	Chevrolet
50	83	Kerry Earnhardt	FitzBradshaw Racing	Chevrolet
51	54	Ron Hornaday Jr.	BH Motorsports	Chevrolet
Official starting lineup

== Race results ==
Fin	#	Driver	Team	Make	Laps	Led	Status	Pts	Winnings
1	97	Kurt Busch	Roush Racing	Ford	248	84	running	185	$212,100
2	25	Joe Nemechek	Hendrick Motorsports	Chevrolet	248	57	running	175	$153,400
3	88	Dale Jarrett	Robert Yates Racing	Ford	248	0	running	165	$136,250
4	20	Tony Stewart	Joe Gibbs Racing	Pontiac	248	39	running	165	$137,178
5	8	Dale Earnhardt Jr.	Dale Earnhardt, Inc.	Chevrolet	248	4	running	160	$97,950
6	24	Jeff Gordon	Hendrick Motorsports	Chevrolet	248	41	running	155	$124,978
7	40	Jamie McMurray	Chip Ganassi Racing	Dodge	248	0	running	146	$110,742
8	6	Mark Martin	Roush Racing	Ford	248	0	running	142	$103,533
9	17	Matt Kenseth	Roush Racing	Ford	248	0	running	138	$82,275
10	12	Ryan Newman (R)	Penske Racing	Ford	248	1	running	139	$92,900
11	15	Michael Waltrip	Dale Earnhardt, Inc.	Chevrolet	248	1	running	135	$77,850
12	99	Jeff Burton	Roush Racing	Ford	248	0	running	127	$106,817
13	18	Bobby Labonte	Joe Gibbs Racing	Pontiac	248	0	running	124	$106,628
14	45	Kyle Petty	Petty Enterprises	Dodge	248	17	running	126	$67,025
15	1	Steve Park	Dale Earnhardt, Inc.	Chevrolet	248	0	running	118	$96,350
16	22	Ward Burton	Bill Davis Racing	Dodge	248	4	running	120	$102,625
17	2	Rusty Wallace	Penske Racing	Ford	247	0	running	112	$103,075
18	21	Elliott Sadler	Wood Brothers Racing	Ford	247	0	running	109	$83,425
19	77	Dave Blaney	Jasper Motorsports	Ford	247	0	running	106	$80,400
20	31	Robby Gordon	Richard Childress Racing	Chevrolet	247	0	running	103	$90,556
21	32	Ricky Craven	PPI Motorsports	Ford	247	0	running	100	$69,350
22	48	Jimmie Johnson (R)	Hendrick Motorsports	Chevrolet	247	0	running	97	$60,500
23	10	Johnny Benson Jr.	MBV Motorsports	Pontiac	246	0	running	94	$86,850
24	30	Jeff Green	Richard Childress Racing	Chevrolet	246	0	running	91	$59,700
25	5	Terry Labonte	Hendrick Motorsports	Chevrolet	246	0	running	88	$88,533
26	4	Mike Skinner	Morgan–McClure Motorsports	Chevrolet	246	0	running	85	$67,389
27	19	Jeremy Mayfield	Evernham Motorsports	Dodge	246	0	running	82	$66,650
28	44	Ted Musgrave	Petty Enterprises	Dodge	246	0	running	79	$58,450
29	74	Tony Raines	BACE Motorsports	Chevrolet	246	0	running	76	$55,300
30	41	Jimmy Spencer	Chip Ganassi Racing	Dodge	246	0	running	73	$58,150
31	14	Mike Wallace	A. J. Foyt Enterprises	Pontiac	246	0	running	70	$55,000
32	28	Ricky Rudd	Robert Yates Racing	Ford	246	0	running	67	$99,237
33	9	Bill Elliott	Evernham Motorsports	Dodge	245	0	running	64	$80,106
34	11	Brett Bodine	Brett Bodine Racing	Ford	245	0	running	61	$54,525
35	55	Bobby Hamilton	Andy Petree Racing	Chevrolet	245	0	running	58	$62,400
36	23	Kenny Wallace	Bill Davis Racing	Dodge	243	0	running	55	$54,325
37	49	Derrike Cope	BAM Racing	Dodge	243	0	running	52	$54,200
38	7	Casey Atwood	Ultra-Evernham Motorsports	Dodge	241	0	running	49	$54,150
39	59	Carl Long (R)	Price Motorsports	Dodge	237	0	running	46	$54,100
40	29	Kevin Harvick	Richard Childress Racing	Chevrolet	221	0	engine	43	$99,818
41	26	Todd Bodine	Haas-Carter Motorsports	Ford	214	0	engine	40	$79,187
42	36	Ken Schrader	MB2 Motorsports	Pontiac	113	0	engine	37	$61,950
43	43	John Andretti	Petty Enterprises	Dodge	4	0	crash	34	$81,243
Official race results

Previous race: 2002 Old Dominion 500	NASCAR Winston Cup Series; 2002 season	Next race: 2002 Pop Secret Microwave Popcorn 400
