= 2002 Checker Auto Parts 500 =

35th race of the 2002 NASCAR Winston Cup Series

2002 Checker Auto Parts 500 presented by Pennzoil
Race details
- Race 35 of 36 in the 2002 NASCAR Winston Cup Series
- The 2002 Checker Auto Parts 500 program cover.
- Date: November 10, 2002
- Official name: 15th Annual Checker Auto Parts 500 presented by Pennzoil
- Location: Avondale, Arizona, Phoenix International Raceway
- Course: Permanent racing facility
- Course length: 1 miles (1.6 km)
- Distance: 312 laps, 312 mi (502.115 km)
- Scheduled distance: 312 laps, 312 mi (502.115 km)
- Average speed: 113.857 miles per hour (183.235 km/h)
- Attendance: 100,000

Pole position
Driver	Ryan Newman	Penske Racing
- Time: 27.138

Most laps led
Driver	Kurt Busch	Roush Racing
- Laps: 117

Winner
No. 17	Matt Kenseth	Roush Racing

Television in the United States
- Network: NBC
- Announcers: Allen Bestwick, Benny Parsons, Wally Dallenbach Jr.

Radio in the United States
- Radio: Motor Racing Network

The 2002 Checker Auto Parts 500 presented by Pennzoil was the 35th stock car race of the 2002 NASCAR Winston Cup Series and the 15th iteration of the event. The race was held on Sunday, November 10, 2002, before a crowd of 100,000 in Avondale, Arizona at Phoenix International Raceway, a 1-mile (1.6 km) permanent low-banked tri-oval race track. The race took the scheduled 312 laps to complete. At race's end, Matt Kenseth, driving for Roush Racing, would pull off a clutch two-tire strategy on the final restart of the race to win his fifth career NASCAR Winston Cup Series win and his fourth of the season. To fill out the podium, Rusty Wallace of Penske Racing and Jeff Gordon of Hendrick Motorsports would finish second and third, respectively.

== Background ==
The layout of Phoenix International Raceway, the venue where the race was held.

Phoenix International Raceway – also known as PIR – is a one-mile, low-banked tri-oval race track located in Avondale, Arizona. It is named after the nearby metropolitan area of Phoenix. The motorsport track opened in 1964 and currently hosts two NASCAR race weekends annually. PIR has also hosted the IndyCar Series, CART, USAC and the Rolex Sports Car Series. The raceway is currently owned and operated by NASCAR.

The raceway was originally constructed with a 2.5 mi (4.0 km) road course that ran both inside and outside of the main tri-oval. In 1991 the track was reconfigured with the current 1.51 mi (2.43 km) interior layout. PIR has an estimated grandstand seating capacity of around 67,000. Lights were installed around the track in 2004 following the addition of a second annual NASCAR race weekend.

=== Entry list ===
- (R) denotes rookie driver.

#	Driver	Team	Make
1	Steve Park	Dale Earnhardt, Inc.	Chevrolet
2	Rusty Wallace	Penske Racing	Ford
4	Mike Skinner	Morgan–McClure Motorsports	Chevrolet
5	Terry Labonte	Hendrick Motorsports	Chevrolet
6	Mark Martin	Roush Racing	Ford
7	Jason Leffler	Ultra Motorsports	Dodge
07	Ted Musgrave	Ultra Motorsports	Dodge
8	Dale Earnhardt Jr.	Dale Earnhardt, Inc.	Chevrolet
9	Bill Elliott	Evernham Motorsports	Dodge
10	Johnny Benson Jr.	MBV Motorsports	Pontiac
11	Brett Bodine	Brett Bodine Racing	Ford
12	Ryan Newman (R)	Penske Racing	Ford
14	Mike Wallace	A. J. Foyt Enterprises	Pontiac
15	Michael Waltrip	Dale Earnhardt, Inc.	Chevrolet
17	Matt Kenseth	Roush Racing	Ford
18	Bobby Labonte	Joe Gibbs Racing	Pontiac
19	Jeremy Mayfield	Evernham Motorsports	Dodge
20	Tony Stewart	Joe Gibbs Racing	Pontiac
21	Elliott Sadler	Wood Brothers Racing	Ford
22	Ward Burton	Bill Davis Racing	Dodge
23	Kenny Wallace	Bill Davis Racing	Dodge
24	Jeff Gordon	Hendrick Motorsports	Chevrolet
25	Joe Nemechek	Hendrick Motorsports	Chevrolet
26	Todd Bodine	Haas-Carter Motorsports	Ford
27	Scott Wimmer	Bill Davis Racing	Dodge
28	Ricky Rudd	Robert Yates Racing	Ford
29	Kevin Harvick	Richard Childress Racing	Chevrolet
30	Jeff Green	Richard Childress Racing	Chevrolet
31	Robby Gordon	Richard Childress Racing	Chevrolet
32	Ricky Craven	PPI Motorsports	Ford
36	Ken Schrader	MB2 Motorsports	Pontiac
37	Jeff Jefferson	Quest Motor Racing	Pontiac
40	Jamie McMurray	Chip Ganassi Racing	Dodge
41	Jimmy Spencer	Chip Ganassi Racing	Dodge
43	John Andretti	Petty Enterprises	Dodge
44	Christian Fittipaldi	Petty Enterprises	Dodge
45	Kyle Petty	Petty Enterprises	Dodge
47	Lance Hooper	Dark Horse Motorsports	Ford
48	Jimmie Johnson (R)	Hendrick Motorsports	Chevrolet
49	Derrike Cope	BAM Racing	Dodge
51	Jerry Robertson	Ware Racing Enterprises	Dodge
55	Bobby Hamilton	Andy Petree Racing	Chevrolet
60	Jack Sprague	Haas CNC Racing	Chevrolet
74	Tony Raines	BACE Motorsports	Chevrolet
77	Dave Blaney	Jasper Motorsports	Ford
83	Ron Hornaday Jr.	FitzBradshaw Racing	Chevrolet
88	Dale Jarrett	Robert Yates Racing	Ford
89	Morgan Shepherd	Shepherd Racing Ventures	Ford
93	Mike Harmon	GIC Motorsports	Ford
97	Kurt Busch	Roush Racing	Ford
99	Jeff Burton	Roush Racing	Ford
Official entry list

*Withdrew. Harmon would withdraw after crashing during practice, and Hooper would withdraw after crashing in practice.

== Practice ==
=== First practice ===
The first practice session was held on Friday, November 8, at 10:30 AM MST, and would last for 2 hours. Ryan Newman of Penske Racing would set the fastest time in the session, with a lap of 27.074 and an average speed of 132.969 mph (213.993 km/h).

Pos.	#	Driver	Team	Make	Time	Speed
1	12	Ryan Newman (R)	Penske Racing	Ford	27.074	132.969
2	43	John Andretti	Petty Enterprises	Dodge	27.206	132.324
3	23	Kenny Wallace	Bill Davis Racing	Dodge	27.227	132.222
Full first practice results

=== Second practice ===
The second practice session was held on Saturday, November 9, at 8:30 AM MST, and would last for 45 minutes. Jimmie Johnson of Hendrick Motorsports would set the fastest time in the session, with a lap of 27.860 and an average speed of 129.217 mph (207.955 km/h).

Pos.	#	Driver	Team	Make	Time	Speed
1	48	Jimmie Johnson (R)	Hendrick Motorsports	Chevrolet	27.860	129.217
2	19	Jeremy Mayfield	Evernham Motorsports	Dodge	27.980	128.663
3	23	Kenny Wallace	Bill Davis Racing	Dodge	27.993	128.604
Full second practice results

=== Final practice ===
The final practice session was held on Saturday, November 9, at 10:15 AM MST, and would last for 45 minutes. Kenny Wallace of Bill Davis Racing would set the fastest time in the session, with a lap of 28.004 and an average speed of 128.553 mph (206.886 km/h).

Pos.	#	Driver	Team	Make	Time	Speed
1	23	Kenny Wallace	Bill Davis Racing	Dodge	28.004	128.553
2	29	Kevin Harvick	Richard Childress Racing	Chevrolet	28.089	128.164
3	27	Scott Wimmer	Bill Davis Racing	Dodge	28.100	128.114
Full Final practice results

== Qualifying ==
Qualifying was held on Friday, November 8, at 3:05 PM MST. Each driver would have two laps to set a fastest time; the fastest of the two would count as their official qualifying lap. Positions 1-36 would be decided on time, while positions 37-43 would be based on provisionals. Six spots are awarded by the use of provisionals based on owner's points. The seventh is awarded to a past champion who has not otherwise qualified for the race. If no past champion needs the provisional, the next team in the owner points will be awarded a provisional.

Ryan Newman of Penske Racing would win the pole, setting a time of 27.138 and an average speed of 132.655 mph (213.488 km/h).

Six drivers would fail to qualify: Ted Musgrave, Jack Sprague, Brett Bodine, Jerry Robertson, Morgan Shepherd, and Jeff Jefferson.

=== Full qualifying results ===
Pos.	#	Driver	Team	Make	Time	Speed
1	12	Ryan Newman (R)	Penske Racing	Ford	27.138	132.655
2	43	John Andretti	Petty Enterprises	Dodge	27.152	132.587
3	8	Dale Earnhardt Jr.	Dale Earnhardt, Inc.	Chevrolet	27.204	132.333
4	24	Jeff Gordon	Hendrick Motorsports	Chevrolet	27.214	132.285
5	77	Dave Blaney	Jasper Motorsports	Ford	27.249	132.115
6	23	Kenny Wallace	Bill Davis Racing	Dodge	27.304	131.849
7	6	Mark Martin	Roush Racing	Ford	27.329	131.728
8	25	Joe Nemechek	Hendrick Motorsports	Chevrolet	27.356	131.598
9	31	Robby Gordon	Richard Childress Racing	Chevrolet	27.379	131.488
10	41	Jimmy Spencer	Chip Ganassi Racing	Dodge	27.384	131.464
11	19	Jeremy Mayfield	Evernham Motorsports	Dodge	27.393	131.420
12	40	Jamie McMurray	Chip Ganassi Racing	Dodge	27.409	131.344
13	97	Kurt Busch	Roush Racing	Ford	27.462	131.090
14	9	Bill Elliott	Evernham Motorsports	Dodge	27.465	131.076
15	21	Elliott Sadler	Wood Brothers Racing	Ford	27.474	131.033
16	20	Tony Stewart	Joe Gibbs Racing	Pontiac	27.478	131.014
17	44	Christian Fittipaldi	Petty Enterprises	Dodge	27.479	131.009
18	45	Kyle Petty	Petty Enterprises	Dodge	27.480	131.004
19	27	Scott Wimmer	Bill Davis Racing	Dodge	27.492	130.947
20	99	Jeff Burton	Roush Racing	Ford	27.493	130.942
21	36	Ken Schrader	MB2 Motorsports	Pontiac	27.493	130.942
22	83	Ron Hornaday Jr.	FitzBradshaw Racing	Chevrolet	27.493	130.942
23	10	Johnny Benson Jr.	MBV Motorsports	Pontiac	27.502	130.900
24	28	Ricky Rudd	Robert Yates Racing	Ford	27.512	130.852
25	29	Kevin Harvick	Richard Childress Racing	Chevrolet	27.521	130.809
26	22	Ward Burton	Bill Davis Racing	Dodge	27.521	130.809
27	88	Dale Jarrett	Robert Yates Racing	Ford	27.545	130.695
28	17	Matt Kenseth	Roush Racing	Ford	27.562	130.615
29	2	Rusty Wallace	Penske Racing	Ford	27.579	130.534
30	26	Todd Bodine	Haas-Carter Motorsports	Ford	27.594	130.463
31	5	Terry Labonte	Hendrick Motorsports	Chevrolet	27.606	130.406
32	1	Steve Park	Dale Earnhardt, Inc.	Chevrolet	27.607	130.402
33	18	Bobby Labonte	Joe Gibbs Racing	Pontiac	27.625	130.317
34	4	Mike Skinner	Morgan–McClure Motorsports	Chevrolet	27.635	130.270
35	32	Ricky Craven	PPI Motorsports	Ford	27.637	130.260
36	7	Jason Leffler	Ultra Motorsports	Dodge	27.645	130.223
Provisionals
37	48	Jimmie Johnson (R)	Hendrick Motorsports	Chevrolet	27.674	130.086
38	15	Michael Waltrip	Dale Earnhardt, Inc.	Chevrolet	27.758	129.692
39	30	Jeff Green	Richard Childress Racing	Chevrolet	27.848	129.273
40	55	Bobby Hamilton	Andy Petree Racing	Chevrolet	27.781	129.585
41	14	Mike Wallace	A. J. Foyt Enterprises	Pontiac	27.883	129.111
42	49	Derrike Cope	BAM Racing	Dodge	27.959	128.760
43	74	Tony Raines	BACE Motorsports	Chevrolet	27.730	129.823
Failed to qualify or withdrew
44	07	Ted Musgrave	Ultra Motorsports	Dodge	27.746	129.748
45	60	Jack Sprague	Haas CNC Racing	Chevrolet	27.830	129.357
46	11	Brett Bodine	Brett Bodine Racing	Ford	27.848	129.273
47	51	Jerry Robertson	Ware Racing Enterprises	Dodge	28.074	128.232
48	89	Morgan Shepherd	Shepherd Racing Ventures	Ford	28.183	127.737
49	37	Jeff Jefferson	Quest Motor Racing	Pontiac	28.361	126.935
WD	47	Lance Hooper	Dark Horse Motorsports	Ford	-	-
WD	93	Mike Harmon	GIC Motorsports	Ford		--
Official qualifying results

== Race results ==
Fin	St	#	Driver	Team	Make	Laps	Led	Status	Pts	Winnings
1	28	17	Matt Kenseth	Roush Racing	Ford	312	55	running	180	$211,895
2	29	2	Rusty Wallace	Penske Racing	Ford	312	0	running	170	$163,825
3	4	24	Jeff Gordon	Hendrick Motorsports	Chevrolet	312	16	running	170	$152,328
4	7	6	Mark Martin	Roush Racing	Ford	312	2	running	165	$129,218
5	3	8	Dale Earnhardt Jr.	Dale Earnhardt, Inc.	Chevrolet	312	105	running	160	$97,850
6	13	97	Kurt Busch	Roush Racing	Ford	312	117	running	160	$76,500
7	5	77	Dave Blaney	Jasper Motorsports	Ford	312	1	running	151	$86,400
8	16	20	Tony Stewart	Joe Gibbs Racing	Pontiac	312	0	running	142	$101,178
9	27	88	Dale Jarrett	Robert Yates Racing	Ford	312	0	running	138	$89,100
10	15	21	Elliott Sadler	Wood Brothers Racing	Ford	312	0	running	134	$76,650
11	6	23	Kenny Wallace	Bill Davis Racing	Dodge	312	0	running	130	$57,000
12	20	99	Jeff Burton	Roush Racing	Ford	312	0	running	127	$93,267
13	24	28	Ricky Rudd	Robert Yates Racing	Ford	312	0	running	124	$92,117
14	2	43	John Andretti	Petty Enterprises	Dodge	312	0	running	121	$77,783
15	37	48	Jimmie Johnson (R)	Hendrick Motorsports	Chevrolet	312	1	running	123	$51,325
16	23	10	Johnny Benson Jr.	MBV Motorsports	Pontiac	312	1	running	120	$73,825
17	25	29	Kevin Harvick	Richard Childress Racing	Chevrolet	311	0	running	112	$88,653
18	1	12	Ryan Newman (R)	Penske Racing	Ford	311	14	running	114	$69,950
19	26	22	Ward Burton	Bill Davis Racing	Dodge	311	0	running	106	$85,450
20	38	15	Michael Waltrip	Dale Earnhardt, Inc.	Chevrolet	311	0	running	103	$56,975
21	32	1	Steve Park	Dale Earnhardt, Inc.	Chevrolet	311	0	running	100	$75,675
22	30	26	Todd Bodine	Haas-Carter Motorsports	Ford	311	0	running	97	$71,262
23	10	41	Jimmy Spencer	Chip Ganassi Racing	Dodge	310	0	running	94	$53,739
24	34	4	Mike Skinner	Morgan–McClure Motorsports	Chevrolet	310	0	running	91	$45,100
25	11	19	Jeremy Mayfield	Evernham Motorsports	Dodge	310	0	running	88	$52,875
26	31	5	Terry Labonte	Hendrick Motorsports	Chevrolet	310	0	running	85	$73,883
27	9	31	Robby Gordon	Richard Childress Racing	Chevrolet	310	0	running	82	$70,481
28	41	14	Mike Wallace	A. J. Foyt Enterprises	Pontiac	310	0	running	79	$44,300
29	40	55	Bobby Hamilton	Andy Petree Racing	Chevrolet	310	0	running	76	$51,675
30	14	9	Bill Elliott	Evernham Motorsports	Dodge	310	0	running	73	$67,606
31	36	7	Jason Leffler	Ultra Motorsports	Dodge	309	0	running	70	$40,925
32	18	45	Kyle Petty	Petty Enterprises	Dodge	309	0	running	67	$40,775
33	8	25	Joe Nemechek	Hendrick Motorsports	Chevrolet	309	0	running	64	$48,650
34	35	32	Ricky Craven	PPI Motorsports	Ford	309	0	running	61	$48,525
35	39	30	Jeff Green	Richard Childress Racing	Chevrolet	307	0	running	58	$40,400
36	22	83	Ron Hornaday Jr.	FitzBradshaw Racing	Chevrolet	307	0	running	55	$40,275
37	21	36	Ken Schrader	MB2 Motorsports	Pontiac	306	0	running	52	$48,150
38	42	49	Derrike Cope	BAM Racing	Dodge	302	0	running	49	$40,025
39	33	18	Bobby Labonte	Joe Gibbs Racing	Pontiac	269	0	engine	46	$85,678
40	12	40	Jamie McMurray	Chip Ganassi Racing	Dodge	253	0	crash	43	$82,067
41	17	44	Christian Fittipaldi	Petty Enterprises	Dodge	252	0	crash	40	$39,600
42	19	27	Scott Wimmer	Bill Davis Racing	Dodge	130	0	crash	37	$39,475
43	43	74	Tony Raines	BACE Motorsports	Chevrolet	120	0	engine	34	$39,593
Official race results

Previous race: 2002 Pop Secret Microwave Popcorn 400	NASCAR Winston Cup Series; 2002 season	Next race: 2002 Ford 400
