= 2002 Pop Secret Microwave Popcorn 400 =

34th race of the 2002 NASCAR Winston Cup Series

Race details
- Race 34 of 36 in the 2002 NASCAR Winston Cup Series
- The 2002 Pop Secret Microwave Popcorn 400 program cover.
- Date: November 3, 2002
- Official name: 38th Annual Pop Secret Microwave Popcorn 400
- Location: Rockingham, North Carolina, North Carolina Speedway
- Course: Permanent racing facility
- Course length: 1.017 miles (1.636 km)
- Distance: 393 laps, 399.681 mi (643.224 km)
- Scheduled distance: 393 laps, 399.681 mi (643.224 km)
- Average speed: 128.526 miles per hour (206.843 km/h)
- Attendance: 50,000

Pole position
Driver	Ryan Newman	Penske Racing South
- Time: 23.494

Most laps led
Driver	Mark Martin	Roush Racing
- Laps: 144

Winner
No. 10	Johnny Benson Jr.	MBV Motorsports

Television in the United States
- Network: TNT
- Announcers: Allen Bestwick, Benny Parsons, Wally Dallenbach Jr.

Radio in the United States
- Radio: Motor Racing Network

The 2002 Pop Secret Microwave Popcorn 400 was the 34th stock car race of the 2002 NASCAR Winston Cup Series and the 38th iteration of the event. The race was held on Sunday, November 3, 2002, in Rockingham, North Carolina, at North Carolina Speedway, a 1.017 miles (1.637 km) permanent high-banked racetrack. The race took the scheduled 393 laps to complete. In the final laps of the race, MBV Motorsports driver Johnny Benson Jr. would manage to defend for the lead within the last 26 laps of the race to take his first and only NASCAR Winston Cup Series victory and his only victory of the season. To fill out the top three, Mark Martin and Kurt Busch, both drivers for Roush Racing, would finish second and third, respectively.

== Background ==
The layout of North Carolina Speedway, the venue where the race was held.

North Carolina Speedway was opened as a flat, one-mile oval on October 31, 1965. In 1969, the track was extensively reconfigured to a high-banked, D-shaped oval just over one mile in length. In 1997, North Carolina Motor Speedway merged with Penske Motorsports, and was renamed North Carolina Speedway. Shortly thereafter, the infield was reconfigured, and competition on the infield road course, mostly by the SCCA, was discontinued. Currently, the track is home to the Fast Track High Performance Driving School.

=== Entry list ===
- (R) denotes rookie driver.

#	Driver	Team	Make
1	Steve Park	Dale Earnhardt, Inc.	Chevrolet
2	Rusty Wallace	Penske Racing South	Ford
02	Hermie Sadler	SCORE Motorsports	Chevrolet
4	Mike Skinner	Morgan–McClure Motorsports	Chevrolet
5	Terry Labonte	Hendrick Motorsports	Chevrolet
6	Mark Martin	Roush Racing	Ford
7	Casey Atwood	Ultra-Evernham Motorsports	Dodge
8	Dale Earnhardt Jr.	Dale Earnhardt, Inc.	Chevrolet
9	Bill Elliott	Evernham Motorsports	Dodge
10	Johnny Benson Jr.	MBV Motorsports	Pontiac
11	Brett Bodine	Brett Bodine Racing	Ford
12	Ryan Newman (R)	Penske Racing	Ford
14	Mike Wallace	A. J. Foyt Enterprises	Pontiac
15	Michael Waltrip	Dale Earnhardt, Inc.	Chevrolet
17	Matt Kenseth	Roush Racing	Ford
18	Bobby Labonte	Joe Gibbs Racing	Pontiac
19	Jeremy Mayfield	Evernham Motorsports	Dodge
20	Tony Stewart	Joe Gibbs Racing	Pontiac
21	Elliott Sadler	Wood Brothers Racing	Ford
22	Ward Burton	Bill Davis Racing	Dodge
23	Kenny Wallace	Bill Davis Racing	Dodge
24	Jeff Gordon	Hendrick Motorsports	Chevrolet
25	Joe Nemechek	Hendrick Motorsports	Chevrolet
26	Todd Bodine	Haas-Carter Motorsports	Ford
28	Ricky Rudd	Robert Yates Racing	Ford
29	Kevin Harvick	Richard Childress Racing	Chevrolet
30	Jeff Green	Richard Childress Racing	Chevrolet
31	Robby Gordon	Richard Childress Racing	Chevrolet
32	Ricky Craven	PPI Motorsports	Ford
36	Ken Schrader	MB2 Motorsports	Pontiac
40	Jamie McMurray	Chip Ganassi Racing	Dodge
41	Jimmy Spencer	Chip Ganassi Racing	Dodge
43	John Andretti	Petty Enterprises	Dodge
44	Greg Biffle	Petty Enterprises	Dodge
45	Kyle Petty	Petty Enterprises	Dodge
48	Jimmie Johnson (R)	Hendrick Motorsports	Chevrolet
54	Ron Hornaday Jr.	BelCar Motorsports	Chevrolet
55	Bobby Hamilton	Andy Petree Racing	Chevrolet
59	Carl Long (R)	Price Motorsports	Dodge
60	Jack Sprague	Haas CNC Racing	Chevrolet
66	Hideo Fukuyama	Haas-Carter Motorsports	Ford
71	Tim Sauter	Marcis Auto Racing	Chevrolet
74	Tony Raines	BACE Motorsports	Chevrolet
77	Dave Blaney	Jasper Motorsports	Ford
88	Dale Jarrett	Robert Yates Racing	Ford
91	Hank Parker Jr.	Evernham Motorsports	Dodge
97	Kurt Busch	Roush Racing	Ford
99	Jeff Burton	Roush Racing	Ford
Official entry list

== Practice ==
=== First practice ===
The first practice session was held on Friday, November 1, at 11:20 am EST. The session would last for two hours. Ryan Newman, driving for Penske Racing South, would set the fastest time in the session, with a lap of 23.744 and an average speed of 154.195 mph (248.153 km/h).

Pos.	#	Driver	Team	Make	Time	Speed
1	12	Ryan Newman (R)	Penske Racing South	Ford	23.744	154.195
2	24	Jeff Gordon	Hendrick Motorsports	Chevrolet	23.867	153.400
3	19	Jeremy Mayfield	Evernham Motorsports	Dodge	23.874	153.355
Full first practice results

=== Second practice ===
The second practice session was held on Saturday, November 2, at 9:30 am EST. The session would last for 45 minutes. Rusty Wallace, driving for Penske Racing South, would set the fastest time in the session, with a lap of 24.201 and an average speed of 151.283 miles per hour (243.466 km/h).

Pos.	#	Driver	Team	Make	Time	Speed
1	2	Rusty Wallace	Penske Racing South	Ford	24.201	151.283
2	12	Ryan Newman (R)	Penske Racing South	Ford	24.203	151.270
3	17	Matt Kenseth	Roush Racing	Ford	24.218	151.177
Full second practice results

=== Final practice ===
The final practice session, was held on Saturday, November 2, at 11:15 am EST. The session would last for 45 minutes. Todd Bodine, driving for Haas-Carter Motorsports, would set the fastest time in the session, with a lap of 24.280 and an average speed of 150.791 mph (242.675 km/h).

Pos.	#	Driver	Team	Make	Time	Speed
1	26	Todd Bodine	Haas-Carter Motorsports	Ford	24.280	150.791
2	6	Mark Martin	Roush Racing	Ford	24.351	150.351
3	55	Bobby Hamilton	Andy Petree Racing	Chevrolet	24.430	149.865
Full Happy Hour practice results

== Qualifying ==
Qualifying was held on Friday, November 1, at 3:05 pm EST. Each driver would have two laps to set a fastest time; the fastest of the two would count as their official qualifying lap. Positions 1–36 would be decided on time, while positions 37–43 would be based on provisionals. Six spots are awarded by the use of provisionals based on owner's points. The seventh is awarded to a past champion who has not otherwise qualified for the race. If no past champ needs the provisional, the next team in the owner points will be awarded a provisional.

Ryan Newman, driving for Penske Racing South, would win the pole, setting a time of 23.494 and an average speed of 155.835 mph (250.792 km/h).

Five drivers would fail to qualify.

=== Full qualifying results ===
Pos.	#	Driver	Team	Make	Time	Speed
1	12	Ryan Newman (R)	Penske Racing South	Ford	23.494	155.835
2	40	Jamie McMurray	Chip Ganassi Racing	Dodge	23.691	154.540
3	26	Todd Bodine	Haas-Carter Motorsports	Ford	23.703	154.462
4	4	Mike Skinner	Morgan–McClure Motorsports	Chevrolet	23.718	154.364
5	6	Mark Martin	Roush Racing	Ford	23.751	154.149
6	30	Jeff Green	Richard Childress Racing	Chevrolet	23.757	154.110
7	97	Kurt Busch	Roush Racing	Ford	23.763	154.072
8	2	Rusty Wallace	Penske Racing South	Ford	23.786	153.923
9	31	Robby Gordon	Richard Childress Racing	Chevrolet	23.787	153.916
10	9	Bill Elliott	Evernham Motorsports	Dodge	23.793	153.877
11	18	Bobby Labonte	Joe Gibbs Racing	Pontiac	23.820	153.703
12	36	Ken Schrader	MB2 Motorsports	Pontiac	23.845	153.542
13	44	Greg Biffle	Petty Enterprises	Dodge	23.862	153.432
14	45	Kyle Petty	Petty Enterprises	Dodge	23.871	153.374
15	41	Jimmy Spencer	Chip Ganassi Racing	Dodge	23.874	153.355
16	23	Kenny Wallace	Bill Davis Racing	Dodge	23.884	153.291
17	19	Jeremy Mayfield	Evernham Motorsports	Dodge	23.886	153.278
18	24	Jeff Gordon	Hendrick Motorsports	Chevrolet	23.902	153.176
19	17	Matt Kenseth	Roush Racing	Ford	23.919	153.067
20	28	Ricky Rudd	Robert Yates Racing	Ford	23.923	153.041
21	25	Joe Nemechek	Hendrick Motorsports	Chevrolet	23.935	152.964
22	8	Dale Earnhardt Jr.	Dale Earnhardt, Inc.	Chevrolet	23.936	152.958
23	32	Ricky Craven	PPI Motorsports	Ford	23.943	152.913
24	20	Tony Stewart	Joe Gibbs Racing	Pontiac	23.963	152.786
25	91	Hank Parker Jr. (R)	Evernham Motorsports	Dodge	23.963	152.786
26	10	Johnny Benson Jr.	MBV Motorsports	Pontiac	23.980	152.677
27	21	Elliott Sadler	Wood Brothers Racing	Ford	23.983	152.658
28	60	Jack Sprague (R)	Haas CNC Racing	Chevrolet	24.002	152.537
29	99	Jeff Burton	Roush Racing	Ford	24.003	152.531
30	77	Dave Blaney	Jasper Motorsports	Ford	24.016	152.448
31	48	Jimmie Johnson (R)	Hendrick Motorsports	Chevrolet	24.022	152.410
32	29	Kevin Harvick	Richard Childress Racing	Chevrolet	24.061	152.163
33	02	Hermie Sadler (R)	SCORE Motorsports	Chevrolet	24.061	152.163
34	22	Ward Burton	Bill Davis Racing	Dodge	24.067	152.125
35	43	John Andretti	Petty Enterprises	Dodge	24.072	152.094
36	15	Michael Waltrip	Dale Earnhardt, Inc.	Chevrolet	24.127	151.747
Provisionals
37	88	Dale Jarrett	Robert Yates Racing	Ford	24.142	151.653
38	5	Terry Labonte	Hendrick Motorsports	Chevrolet	24.338	150.431
39	55	Bobby Hamilton	Andy Petree Racing	Chevrolet	24.135	151.697
40	1	Steve Park	Dale Earnhardt, Inc.	Chevrolet	24.228	151.114
41	14	Mike Wallace	A. J. Foyt Enterprises	Pontiac	24.166	151.502
42	7	Casey Atwood	Ultra-Evernham Motorsports	Dodge	24.133	151.709
43	11	Brett Bodine	Brett Bodine Racing	Ford	24.178	151.427
Failed to qualify
44	74	Tony Raines	BACE Motorsports	Chevrolet	24.186	151.377
45	71	Tim Sauter	Marcis Auto Racing	Chevrolet	24.214	151.202
46	59	Carl Long (R)	Price Motorsports	Dodge	24.248	150.990
47	54	Ron Hornaday Jr.	BelCar Motorsports	Chevrolet	24.331	150.475
48	66	Hideo Fukuyama	Haas-Carter Motorsports	Ford	24.445	149.773
Official qualifying results

== Race results ==
Fin	#	Driver	Team	Make	Laps	Led	Status	Pts	Winnings
1	10	Johnny Benson Jr.	MBV Motorsports	Pontiac	393	28	running	180	$162,965
2	6	Mark Martin	Roush Racing	Ford	393	144	running	155	$130,923
3	97	Kurt Busch	Roush Racing	Ford	393	105	running	170	$80,400
4	99	Jeff Burton	Roush Racing	Ford	393	0	running	160	$106,267
5	24	Jeff Gordon	Hendrick Motorsports	Chevrolet	393	0	running	155	$106,713
6	4	Mike Skinner	Morgan–McClure Motorsports	Chevrolet	393	0	running	150	$69,625
7	18	Bobby Labonte	Joe Gibbs Racing	Pontiac	393	4	running	151	$92,453
8	17	Matt Kenseth	Roush Racing	Ford	393	0	running	142	$64,175
9	32	Ricky Craven	PPI Motorsports	Ford	393	0	running	138	$60,175
10	30	Jeff Green	Richard Childress Racing	Chevrolet	393	68	running	139	$53,675
11	31	Robby Gordon	Richard Childress Racing	Chevrolet	392	0	running	130	$74,981
12	88	Dale Jarrett	Robert Yates Racing	Ford	392	0	running	127	$80,900
13	23	Kenny Wallace	Bill Davis Racing	Dodge	392	0	running	124	$48,750
14	20	Tony Stewart	Joe Gibbs Racing	Pontiac	392	0	running	121	$91,478
15	40	Jamie McMurray	Chip Ganassi Racing	Dodge	392	1	running	123	$90,067
16	21	Elliott Sadler	Wood Brothers Racing	Ford	392	0	running	115	$68,100
17	77	Dave Blaney	Jasper Motorsports	Ford	392	0	running	112	$65,200
18	43	John Andretti	Petty Enterprises	Dodge	392	0	running	109	$73,383
19	15	Michael Waltrip	Dale Earnhardt, Inc.	Chevrolet	392	0	running	106	$53,900
20	28	Ricky Rudd	Robert Yates Racing	Ford	392	0	running	103	$89,567
21	19	Jeremy Mayfield	Evernham Motorsports	Dodge	392	0	running	100	$53,500
22	36	Ken Schrader	MB2 Motorsports	Pontiac	391	0	out of gas	97	$61,239
23	12	Ryan Newman (R)	Penske Racing South	Ford	391	41	running	99	$60,050
24	1	Steve Park	Dale Earnhardt, Inc.	Chevrolet	391	0	running	91	$74,125
25	44	Greg Biffle	Petty Enterprises	Dodge	391	0	running	88	$44,350
26	29	Kevin Harvick	Richard Childress Racing	Chevrolet	391	0	running	85	$86,528
27	2	Rusty Wallace	Penske Racing South	Ford	391	0	running	82	$84,785
28	25	Joe Nemechek	Hendrick Motorsports	Chevrolet	391	0	running	79	$51,335
29	7	Casey Atwood	Ultra-Evernham Motorsports	Dodge	391	0	running	76	$42,650
30	45	Kyle Petty	Petty Enterprises	Dodge	390	0	running	73	$40,525
31	41	Jimmy Spencer	Chip Ganassi Racing	Dodge	390	0	running	70	$39,875
32	5	Terry Labonte	Hendrick Motorsports	Chevrolet	390	0	running	67	$68,583
33	91	Hank Parker Jr. (R)	Evernham Motorsports	Dodge	389	0	running	64	$39,625
34	8	Dale Earnhardt Jr.	Dale Earnhardt, Inc.	Chevrolet	389	0	running	61	$59,100
35	60	Jack Sprague	Haas CNC Racing	Chevrolet	386	0	running	58	$39,375
36	11	Brett Bodine	Brett Bodine Racing	Ford	386	0	running	55	$39,325
37	48	Jimmie Johnson (R)	Hendrick Motorsports	Chevrolet	379	0	running	52	$39,275
38	55	Bobby Hamilton	Andy Petree Racing	Chevrolet	341	0	running	49	$47,215
39	9	Bill Elliott	Evernham Motorsports	Dodge	301	1	water pump	51	$65,221
40	22	Ward Burton	Bill Davis Racing	Dodge	289	0	crash	43	$82,090
41	02	Hermie Sadler	SCORE Motorsports	Chevrolet	260	0	engine	40	$39,020
42	26	Todd Bodine	Haas-Carter Motorsports	Ford	256	1	crash	42	$64,322
43	14	Mike Wallace	A. J. Foyt Enterprises	Pontiac	120	0	crash	34	$38,232
Official race results

Previous race: 2002 NAPA 500	NASCAR Winston Cup Series; 2002 season	Next race: 2002 Checker Auto Parts 500
