= 2002 Old Dominion 500 =

32nd race of the 2002 NASCAR Winston Cup Series

Race details
- Race 32 of 36 in the 2002 NASCAR Winston Cup Series
- The 2002 Old Dominion 500 program cover.
- Date: October 20, 2002
- Official name: 54th Annual Old Dominion 500
- Location: Martinsville, Virginia, Martinsville Speedway
- Course: Permanent racing facility
- Course length: 0.526 miles (0.847 km)
- Distance: 500 laps, 263 mi (423.257 km)
- Scheduled distance: 500 laps, 263 mi (423.257 km)
- Average speed: 74.651 miles per hour (120.139 km/h)
- Attendance: 87,000

Pole position
| Driver | Ryan Newman | Penske Racing South |
- Time: 20.397

Most laps led
| Driver | Ward Burton | Bill Davis Racing |
- Laps: 145

Winner
| No. 97 | Kurt Busch | Roush Racing |

Television in the United States
- Network: NBC
- Announcers: Allen Bestwick, Benny Parsons, Wally Dallenbach Jr.

Radio in the United States
- Radio: Motor Racing Network

The 2002 Old Dominion 500 was the 32nd stock car race of the 2002 NASCAR Winston Cup Series and the 54th iteration of the event. The race was held on Sunday, October 20, 2002, before a crowd of 87,000 in Martinsville, Virginia at Martinsville Speedway, a 0.526 miles (0.847 km) permanent oval-shaped short track. The race took the scheduled 500 laps to complete. At race's end, Kurt Busch, driving for Roush Racing, would come back from a dismal starting spot and spin to control the late stages of the race and win. The win was Busch's second career NASCAR Winston Cup Series victory and his second victory of the season. To fill out the podium, Johnny Benson Jr., driving for MBV Motorsports, and Ricky Rudd, driving for Robert Yates Racing, would finish second and third, respectively.

== Background ==
The layout of Martinsville Speedway, the venue where the race was held.

Martinsville Speedway is a NASCAR-owned stock car racing track located in Henry County, in Ridgeway, Virginia, just to the south of Martinsville. At 0.526 miles (0.847 km) in length, it is the shortest track in the NASCAR Cup Series. The track was also one of the first paved oval tracks in NASCAR, being built in 1947 by H. Clay Earles. It is also the only remaining race track that has been on the NASCAR circuit from its beginning in 1948.

=== Entry list ===
- (R) denotes rookie driver.

| # | Driver | Team | Make |
|---|---|---|---|
| 1 | Steve Park | Dale Earnhardt, Inc. | Chevrolet |
| 2 | Rusty Wallace | Penske Racing | Ford |
| 02 | Hermie Sadler | SCORE Motorsports | Chevrolet |
| 4 | Mike Skinner | Morgan–McClure Motorsports | Chevrolet |
| 5 | Terry Labonte | Hendrick Motorsports | Chevrolet |
| 6 | Mark Martin | Roush Racing | Ford |
| 7 | Casey Atwood | Ultra-Evernham Motorsports | Dodge |
| 07 | Ted Musgrave | Ultra Motorsports | Dodge |
| 8 | Dale Earnhardt Jr. | Dale Earnhardt, Inc. | Chevrolet |
| 9 | Bill Elliott | Evernham Motorsports | Dodge |
| 10 | Johnny Benson Jr. | MBV Motorsports | Pontiac |
| 11 | Brett Bodine | Brett Bodine Racing | Ford |
| 12 | Ryan Newman (R) | Penske Racing | Ford |
| 14 | Mike Wallace | A. J. Foyt Enterprises | Pontiac |
| 15 | Michael Waltrip | Dale Earnhardt, Inc. | Chevrolet |
| 17 | Matt Kenseth | Roush Racing | Ford |
| 18 | Bobby Labonte | Joe Gibbs Racing | Pontiac |
| 19 | Jeremy Mayfield | Evernham Motorsports | Dodge |
| 20 | Tony Stewart | Joe Gibbs Racing | Pontiac |
| 21 | Elliott Sadler | Wood Brothers Racing | Ford |
| 22 | Ward Burton | Bill Davis Racing | Dodge |
| 23 | Geoff Bodine | Bill Davis Racing | Dodge |
| 24 | Jeff Gordon | Hendrick Motorsports | Chevrolet |
| 25 | Joe Nemechek | Hendrick Motorsports | Chevrolet |
| 26 | Todd Bodine | Haas-Carter Motorsports | Ford |
| 27 | Kirk Shelmerdine | Kirk Shelmerdine Racing | Ford |
| 28 | Ricky Rudd | Robert Yates Racing | Ford |
| 29 | Kevin Harvick | Richard Childress Racing | Chevrolet |
| 30 | Jeff Green | Richard Childress Racing | Chevrolet |
| 31 | Robby Gordon | Richard Childress Racing | Chevrolet |
| 32 | Ricky Craven | PPI Motorsports | Ford |
| 36 | Ken Schrader | MB2 Motorsports | Pontiac |
| 40 | Mike Bliss | Chip Ganassi Racing | Dodge |
| 41 | Jimmy Spencer | Chip Ganassi Racing | Dodge |
| 43 | John Andretti | Petty Enterprises | Dodge |
| 44 | Steve Grissom | Petty Enterprises | Dodge |
| 45 | Kyle Petty | Petty Enterprises | Dodge |
| 48 | Jimmie Johnson (R) | Hendrick Motorsports | Chevrolet |
| 51 | Brian Rose | Ware Racing Enterprises | Dodge |
| 55 | Bobby Hamilton | Andy Petree Racing | Chevrolet |
| 59 | Carl Long (R) | Price Motorsports | Dodge |
| 66 | Hideo Fukuyama | Haas-Carter Motorsports | Ford |
| 77 | Dave Blaney | Jasper Motorsports | Ford |
| 80 | Ryan McGlynn | McGlynn Racing | Chevrolet |
| 88 | Dale Jarrett | Robert Yates Racing | Ford |
| 89 | Morgan Shepherd | Shepherd Racing Ventures | Ford |
| 97 | Kurt Busch | Roush Racing | Ford |
| 99 | Jeff Burton | Roush Racing | Ford |
Official entry list

== Practice ==
=== First practice ===
The first practice session was held on Friday, October 18, at 11:20 am EST. The session would last for two hours. Ryan Newman, driving for Penske Racing South, would set the fastest time in the session, with a lap of 20.503 and an average speed of 92.357 mph (148.634 km/h).

| Pos. | # | Driver | Team | Make | Time | Speed |
|---|---|---|---|---|---|---|
| 1 | 12 | Ryan Newman (R) | Penske Racing South | Ford | 20.503 | 92.357 |
| 2 | 24 | Jeff Gordon | Hendrick Motorsports | Chevrolet | 20.524 | 92.263 |
| 3 | 28 | Ricky Rudd | Robert Yates Racing | Ford | 20.532 | 92.227 |
Full first practice results

=== Second practice ===
The second practice session was held on Saturday, October 19, at 11:15 am EST. The session would last for 45 minutes. Ryan Newman, driving for Penske Racing South, would set the fastest time in the session, with a lap of 20.503 and an average speed of 92.357 mph (148.634 km/h).

| Pos. | # | Driver | Team | Make | Time | Speed |
|---|---|---|---|---|---|---|
| 1 | 12 | Ryan Newman (R) | Penske Racing South | Ford | 20.758 | 91.223 |
| 2 | 9 | Bill Elliott | Evernham Motorsports | Dodge | 20.778 | 91.135 |
| 3 | 28 | Ricky Rudd | Robert Yates Racing | Ford | 20.789 | 91.087 |
Full second practice results

=== Final practice ===
The final practice session was held on Saturday, October 19, at 12:30 pm EST. The session would last for 45 minutes. Rusty Wallace, driving for Penske Racing South, would set the fastest time in the session, with a lap of 20.503 and an average speed of 92.357 mph (148.634 km/h).

| Pos. | # | Driver | Team | Make | Time | Speed |
|---|---|---|---|---|---|---|
| 1 | 2 | Rusty Wallace | Penske Racing South | Ford | 20.661 | 91.651 |
| 2 | 26 | Todd Bodine | Haas-Carter Motorsports | Ford | 20.708 | 91.443 |
| 3 | 20 | Tony Stewart | Joe Gibbs Racing | Pontiac | 20.717 | 91.403 |
Full Happy Hour practice results

== Qualifying ==
Qualifying was held on Friday, October 18, at 3:05 pm EST. Each driver would have two laps to set a fastest time; the fastest of the two would count as their official qualifying lap. Positions 1–36 would be decided on time, while positions 37–43 would be based on provisionals. Six spots are awarded by the use of provisionals based on owner's points. The seventh is awarded to a past champion who has not otherwise qualified for the race. If no past champ needs the provisional, the next team in the owner points will be awarded a provisional.

Ryan Newman, driving for Penske Racing South, would win the pole, setting a time of 20.397 and an average speed of 92.837 mph (149.407 km/h).

Five drivers would fail to qualify: Brian Rose, Carl Long, Morgan Shepherd, Ryan McGlynn, and Kirk Shelmerdine.

=== Full qualifying results ===
| Pos. | # | Driver | Team | Make | Time | Speed |
|---|---|---|---|---|---|---|
| 1 | 12 | Ryan Newman (R) | Penske Racing South | Ford | 20.397 | 92.837 |
| 2 | 24 | Jeff Gordon | Hendrick Motorsports | Chevrolet | 20.420 | 92.733 |
| 3 | 9 | Bill Elliott | Evernham Motorsports | Dodge | 20.466 | 92.524 |
| 4 | 22 | Ward Burton | Bill Davis Racing | Dodge | 20.505 | 92.348 |
| 5 | 2 | Rusty Wallace | Penske Racing South | Ford | 20.516 | 92.299 |
| 6 | 25 | Joe Nemechek | Hendrick Motorsports | Chevrolet | 20.539 | 92.195 |
| 7 | 48 | Jimmie Johnson (R) | Hendrick Motorsports | Chevrolet | 20.541 | 92.186 |
| 8 | 02 | Hermie Sadler | SCORE Motorsports | Chevrolet | 20.549 | 92.150 |
| 9 | 4 | Mike Skinner | Morgan–McClure Motorsports | Chevrolet | 20.565 | 92.079 |
| 10 | 8 | Dale Earnhardt Jr. | Dale Earnhardt, Inc. | Chevrolet | 20.572 | 92.047 |
| 11 | 10 | Johnny Benson Jr. | MBV Motorsports | Pontiac | 20.573 | 92.043 |
| 12 | 31 | Robby Gordon | Richard Childress Racing | Chevrolet | 20.575 | 92.034 |
| 13 | 29 | Kevin Harvick | Richard Childress Racing | Chevrolet | 20.577 | 92.025 |
| 14 | 32 | Ricky Craven | PPI Motorsports | Ford | 20.579 | 92.016 |
| 15 | 88 | Dale Jarrett | Robert Yates Racing | Ford | 20.595 | 91.945 |
| 16 | 1 | Steve Park | Dale Earnhardt, Inc. | Chevrolet | 20.599 | 91.927 |
| 17 | 17 | Matt Kenseth | Roush Racing | Ford | 20.610 | 91.878 |
| 18 | 28 | Ricky Rudd | Robert Yates Racing | Ford | 20.616 | 91.851 |
| 19 | 07 | Ted Musgrave | Ultra Motorsports | Dodge | 20.620 | 91.833 |
| 20 | 6 | Mark Martin | Roush Racing | Ford | 20.641 | 91.740 |
| 21 | 41 | Jimmy Spencer | Chip Ganassi Racing | Dodge | 20.642 | 91.735 |
| 22 | 7 | Casey Atwood | Ultra-Evernham Motorsports | Dodge | 20.647 | 91.713 |
| 23 | 55 | Bobby Hamilton | Andy Petree Racing | Chevrolet | 20.664 | 91.638 |
| 24 | 19 | Jeremy Mayfield | Evernham Motorsports | Dodge | 20.667 | 91.624 |
| 25 | 36 | Ken Schrader | MB2 Motorsports | Pontiac | 20.674 | 91.593 |
| 26 | 14 | Mike Wallace | A. J. Foyt Enterprises | Pontiac | 20.677 | 91.580 |
| 27 | 40 | Mike Bliss | Chip Ganassi Racing | Dodge | 20.681 | 91.562 |
| 28 | 30 | Jeff Green | Richard Childress Racing | Chevrolet | 20.687 | 91.536 |
| 29 | 18 | Bobby Labonte | Joe Gibbs Racing | Pontiac | 20.687 | 91.536 |
| 30 | 77 | Dave Blaney | Jasper Motorsports | Ford | 20.687 | 91.536 |
| 31 | 20 | Tony Stewart | Joe Gibbs Racing | Pontiac | 20.688 | 91.531 |
| 32 | 26 | Todd Bodine | Haas-Carter Motorsports | Ford | 20.700 | 91.478 |
| 33 | 11 | Brett Bodine | Brett Bodine Racing | Ford | 20.710 | 91.434 |
| 34 | 5 | Terry Labonte | Hendrick Motorsports | Chevrolet | 20.721 | 91.386 |
| 35 | 99 | Jeff Burton | Roush Racing | Ford | 20.737 | 91.315 |
| 36 | 97 | Kurt Busch | Roush Racing | Ford | 20.750 | 91.258 |
Provisionals
| 37 | 15 | Michael Waltrip | Dale Earnhardt, Inc. | Chevrolet | 20.753 | 91.245 |
| 38 | 45 | Kyle Petty | Petty Enterprises | Dodge | 20.817 | 90.964 |
| 39 | 21 | Elliott Sadler | Wood Brothers Racing | Ford | 20.853 | 90.807 |
| 40 | 43 | John Andretti | Petty Enterprises | Dodge | 20.791 | 91.078 |
| 41 | 23 | Geoff Bodine | Bill Davis Racing | Dodge | 20.859 | 90.781 |
| 42 | 44 | Steve Grissom | Petty Enterprises | Dodge | 20.932 | 90.464 |
| 43 | 66 | Hideo Fukuyama | Haas-Carter Motorsports | Ford | 21.085 | 89.808 |
Failed to qualify
| 44 | 51 | Brian Rose | Ware Racing Enterprises | Dodge | 20.823 | 90.938 |
| 45 | 59 | Carl Long (R) | Price Motorsports | Dodge | 20.920 | 90.516 |
| 46 | 89 | Morgan Shepherd | Shepherd Racing Ventures | Ford | 20.973 | 90.287 |
| 47 | 80 | Ryan McGlynn | McGlynn Racing | Chevrolet | 21.337 | 88.747 |
| 48 | 27 | Kirk Shelmerdine | Kirk Shelmerdine Racing | Ford | 21.443 | 88.309 |
Official qualifying results

== Race results ==
| Fin | # | Driver | Team | Make | Laps | Led | Status | Pts | Winnings |
|---|---|---|---|---|---|---|---|---|---|
| 1 | 97 | Kurt Busch | Roush Racing | Ford | 500 | 111 | running | 180 | $142,175 |
| 2 | 10 | Johnny Benson Jr. | MBV Motorsports | Pontiac | 500 | 16 | running | 175 | $105,450 |
| 3 | 28 | Ricky Rudd | Robert Yates Racing | Ford | 500 | 0 | running | 165 | $110,417 |
| 4 | 8 | Dale Earnhardt Jr. | Dale Earnhardt, Inc. | Chevrolet | 500 | 0 | running | 160 | $75,870 |
| 5 | 22 | Ward Burton | Bill Davis Racing | Dodge | 500 | 145 | running | 140 | $106,675 |
| 6 | 48 | Jimmie Johnson (R) | Hendrick Motorsports | Chevrolet | 500 | 0 | running | 150 | $49,550 |
| 7 | 32 | Ricky Craven | PPI Motorsports | Ford | 500 | 129 | running | 151 | $57,300 |
| 8 | 88 | Dale Jarrett | Robert Yates Racing | Ford | 500 | 0 | running | 142 | $80,975 |
| 9 | 2 | Rusty Wallace | Penske Racing South | Ford | 500 | 41 | running | 143 | $86,625 |
| 10 | 6 | Mark Martin | Roush Racing | Ford | 500 | 0 | running | 134 | $84,258 |
| 11 | 20 | Tony Stewart | Joe Gibbs Racing | Pontiac | 500 | 2 | running | 135 | $88,338 |
| 12 | 18 | Bobby Labonte | Joe Gibbs Racing | Pontiac | 500 | 0 | running | 127 | $85,828 |
| 13 | 43 | John Andretti | Petty Enterprises | Dodge | 500 | 0 | running | 124 | $71,133 |
| 14 | 40 | Mike Bliss | Chip Ganassi Racing | Dodge | 500 | 0 | running | 121 | $81,942 |
| 15 | 12 | Ryan Newman (R) | Penske Racing South | Ford | 499 | 33 | running | 123 | $72,475 |
| 16 | 1 | Steve Park | Dale Earnhardt, Inc. | Chevrolet | 499 | 0 | running | 115 | $75,400 |
| 17 | 99 | Jeff Burton | Roush Racing | Ford | 499 | 0 | running | 112 | $83,692 |
| 18 | 15 | Michael Waltrip | Dale Earnhardt, Inc. | Chevrolet | 499 | 0 | running | 109 | $50,330 |
| 19 | 17 | Matt Kenseth | Roush Racing | Ford | 499 | 0 | running | 106 | $55,875 |
| 20 | 77 | Dave Blaney | Jasper Motorsports | Ford | 499 | 18 | running | 108 | $64,825 |
| 21 | 7 | Casey Atwood | Ultra-Evernham Motorsports | Dodge | 499 | 0 | running | 100 | $52,075 |
| 22 | 5 | Terry Labonte | Hendrick Motorsports | Chevrolet | 499 | 0 | running | 97 | $70,158 |
| 23 | 31 | Robby Gordon | Richard Childress Racing | Chevrolet | 499 | 0 | running | 94 | $66,631 |
| 24 | 41 | Jimmy Spencer | Chip Ganassi Racing | Dodge | 499 | 0 | running | 91 | $48,714 |
| 25 | 55 | Bobby Hamilton | Andy Petree Racing | Chevrolet | 499 | 0 | running | 88 | $48,075 |
| 26 | 36 | Ken Schrader | MB2 Motorsports | Pontiac | 499 | 0 | running | 85 | $48,225 |
| 27 | 14 | Mike Wallace | A. J. Foyt Enterprises | Pontiac | 499 | 0 | running | 82 | $39,560 |
| 28 | 19 | Jeremy Mayfield | Evernham Motorsports | Dodge | 499 | 0 | running | 79 | $47,410 |
| 29 | 07 | Ted Musgrave | Ultra Motorsports | Dodge | 498 | 0 | running | 76 | $36,275 |
| 30 | 26 | Todd Bodine | Haas-Carter Motorsports | Ford | 498 | 0 | running | 73 | $64,387 |
| 31 | 29 | Kevin Harvick | Richard Childress Racing | Chevrolet | 498 | 0 | running | 70 | $81,903 |
| 32 | 30 | Jeff Green | Richard Childress Racing | Chevrolet | 498 | 0 | running | 67 | $36,050 |
| 33 | 4 | Mike Skinner | Morgan–McClure Motorsports | Chevrolet | 498 | 0 | running | 64 | $35,925 |
| 34 | 21 | Elliott Sadler | Wood Brothers Racing | Ford | 498 | 0 | running | 61 | $43,875 |
| 35 | 02 | Hermie Sadler | SCORE Motorsports | Chevrolet | 497 | 0 | running | 58 | $35,825 |
| 36 | 24 | Jeff Gordon | Hendrick Motorsports | Chevrolet | 497 | 0 | running | 55 | $90,753 |
| 37 | 45 | Kyle Petty | Petty Enterprises | Dodge | 497 | 0 | running | 52 | $35,725 |
| 38 | 11 | Brett Bodine | Brett Bodine Racing | Ford | 497 | 0 | running | 49 | $35,665 |
| 39 | 23 | Geoff Bodine | Bill Davis Racing | Dodge | 497 | 5 | running | 51 | $35,615 |
| 40 | 44 | Steve Grissom | Petty Enterprises | Dodge | 497 | 0 | running | 43 | $35,540 |
| 41 | 25 | Joe Nemechek | Hendrick Motorsports | Chevrolet | 496 | 0 | running | 40 | $43,490 |
| 42 | 9 | Bill Elliott | Evernham Motorsports | Dodge | 424 | 0 | crash | 37 | $62,491 |
| 43 | 66 | Hideo Fukuyama | Haas-Carter Motorsports | Ford | 400 | 0 | crash | 34 | $34,730 |
Official race results

| Previous race: 2002 UAW-GM Quality 500 | NASCAR Winston Cup Series; 2002 season | Next race: 2002 NAPA 500 |
