= 2003 Daytona 500 =

45th iteration of Daytona 500

Race details
- Race 1 of 36 in the 2003 NASCAR Winston Cup Series
- 2003 Daytona 500 logo
- Date: February 16, 2003
- Location: Daytona International Speedway, Daytona Beach, Florida
- Course: Permanent racing facility 2.5 mi (4.02336 km)
- Distance: 109 laps, 272.5 mi (438.546 km)
- Scheduled distance: 200 laps, 500 mi (804.672 km)
- Weather: Warm with temperatures reaching up to 81 °F (27 °C); wind speeds approaching 22.9 miles per hour (36.9 km/h)
- Average speed: 133.870 miles per hour (215.443 km/h)
- Attendance: 200,000

Pole position
Driver	Jeff Green	Richard Childress Racing

Qualifying race winners
Duel 1 Winner	Robby Gordon	Richard Childress Racing
Duel 2 Winner	Dale Earnhardt Jr.	Dale Earnhardt Inc.

Most laps led
Driver	Michael Waltrip	Dale Earnhardt Inc.
- Laps: 68

Winner
No. 15	Michael Waltrip	Dale Earnhardt Inc.

Television in the United States
- Network: Fox
- Announcers: Mike Joy, Darrell Waltrip and Larry McReynolds
- Nielsen ratings: 9.8/21 (16.8 million average viewers)

The 2003 Daytona 500, the 45th running of the event, was the first race of the 2003 NASCAR Winston Cup season, having been held on February 16 at Daytona International Speedway in Daytona Beach, Florida. 2000 NASCAR Busch Series champion Jeff Green won his second career Winston Cup pole.

Prior to the race, the drivers paid tribute by having decals on their cars in honor of the astronauts who were killed in the Space Shuttle Columbia disaster two weeks earlier, similar to the 1986 Daytona 500, in which they paid tribute to the fallen crew members of the Space Shuttle Challenger disaster. In addition, the Pledge of Allegiance and pre-race opening invocation given by the Reverend Hal Marchman, in his next-to-last running of the event before his retirement and subsequent death, were recited. Grammy Award-winning artist Mariah Carey then performed the national anthem.

The race ended after 109 laps when rain had begun pouring on the track. Michael Waltrip won the race for the second time in three years, giving him his third NASCAR Winston Cup win; all of his wins to that point had been in races held at Daytona. It was the first of Waltrip's two wins in 2003, both coming in restrictor plate races (he later won the EA Sports 500 at Talladega in October for his fourth and last Cup win). For the first time since 1966, the race was stopped due to rain; at 272.5 miles, it had been the shortest Daytona 500 ever.

During lap 58 into the race, Ryan Newman had an accident in the tri-oval, where his No. 12 Dodge tumbled end-over-end onto the track's infield grass, but he was not injured in the crash.

This is the first Daytona 500 event that respected Winston Cup veteran Dave Marcis did not attempt since 1967, a whole season before he had started driving.

== Race summary ==
The green flag came nearly half an hour earlier than planned, due to the impending rain showers which officials feared would lead to the race having to be completed on another day. Jeff Green was out in front at the start of the race, but he was quickly passed by Michael Waltrip who led the first 34 laps. On lap 42, the race's first caution came out after Bobby Labonte spun out entering the backstretch. Dale Earnhardt Jr. took the lead from Tony Stewart as the field raced back to the caution. The first round of green flag pit stops came on lap 50.

On lap 58 Ryan Newman was running in the Top 15, but defending Daytona 500 champion Ward Burton hit Ken Schrader and both he and Newman hit the wall. The rear tire fixture underneath Newman's car detached from the car as he went sliding into the infield grass, and the No.12 went airborne and when it landed, its right-rear wheel dug into the dirt, causing Newman to flip several times before landing on its roof. Most of the car came apart in the infield, but Newman was uninjured and was able to walk away from the crash. Following Newman's flip, there were six caution laps, during which a light rain began to fall, so the race was red-flagged when the rain became heavier.

Following a rain delay which lasted over an hour, the race restarted with Michael Waltrip back in front. The race remained under the green flag until lap 95, when Jeff Green and Jimmy Spencer collided entering turn 4, bringing out a third caution. Spencer ended up hitting the frontstretch retaining wall and coming to rest just past the start-finish line. Spencer had a very similar crash in the 2000 race. A caution came on lap 103 for debris, and then Ward Burton hit the turn 4 wall on lap 106, bringing out another. There were three yellow flag laps after Burton's crash, and the race was once red-flagged again due to more rain. Although it briefly looked as if the race would get back underway, the race was eventually called off due to the forecast of more rain and Michael Waltrip was declared as the winner. It was his third career Winston Cup win both overall and at Daytona, and his second career Daytona 500 win. Coincidentally, Waltrip's first three wins came in the first three Daytona races broadcast by Fox.

This was the third Daytona 500 to have been shortened by rain, following the races held in 1965 and 1966. At 272.5 miles and 109 laps, this race was also the shortest Daytona 500 ever, only eight laps more than the minimum required for an official race (101 laps).

== Results ==
W = Past winner of the Daytona 500; R = Daytona 500/NASCAR Winston Cup Series Rookie

Pos	Grid	Car No.	Driver	Team	Manufacturer	Laps	Laps Led	Status
1	4	15	Michael Waltrip (W)	Dale Earnhardt, Inc.	Chevrolet	109	68	Running
2	36	97	Kurt Busch	Roush Racing	Ford	109	0	Running
3	10	48	Jimmie Johnson	Hendrick Motorsports	Chevrolet	109	8	Running
4	31	29	Kevin Harvick	Richard Childress Racing	Chevrolet	109	0	Running
5	26	6	Mark Martin	Roush Racing	Ford	109	0	Running
6	3	31	Robby Gordon	Richard Childress Racing	Chevrolet	109	0	Running
7	8	20	Tony Stewart	Joe Gibbs Racing	Chevrolet	109	6	Running
8	20	19	Jeremy Mayfield	Evernham Motorsports	Dodge	109	0	Running
9	18	09	Mike Wallace	Phoenix Racing	Dodge	109	0	Running
10	11	88	Dale Jarrett (W)	Robert Yates Racing	Ford	109	0	Running
11	9	99	Jeff Burton	Roush Racing	Ford	109	0	Running
12	13	24	Jeff Gordon (W)	Hendrick Motorsports	Chevrolet	109	0	Running
13	30	45	Kyle Petty	Petty Enterprises	Dodge	109	0	Running
14	24	0	Jack Sprague (R)	Haas CNC Racing	Pontiac	109	0	Running
15	5	21	Ricky Rudd	Wood Brothers Racing	Ford	109	0	Running
16	21	23	Kenny Wallace	Bill Davis Racing	Dodge	109	0	Running
17	7	40	Sterling Marlin (W)	Chip Ganassi Racing	Dodge	109	0	Running
18	6	54	Todd Bodine	BelCar Motorsports	Ford	109	1	Running
19	40	10	Johnny Benson	MBV Motorsports	Pontiac	109	0	Running
20	35	17	Matt Kenseth	Roush Racing	Ford	109	2	Running
21	27	16	Greg Biffle (R)	Roush Racing	Ford	109	0	Running
22	15	25	Joe Nemechek	Hendrick Motorsports	Chevrolet	109	0	Running
23	16	38	Elliott Sadler	Robert Yates Racing	Ford	109	0	Running
24	39	77	Dave Blaney	Jasper Motorsports	Ford	109	0	Running
25	38	2	Rusty Wallace	Penske Racing	Dodge	109	0	Running
26	25	32	Ricky Craven	PPI Motorsports	Pontiac	109	1	Running
27	29	41	Casey Mears (R)	Chip Ganassi Racing	Dodge	109	1	Running
28	42	01	Jerry Nadeau	MBV Motorsports	Pontiac	109	0	Running
29	32	1	Steve Park	Dale Earnhardt, Inc.	Chevrolet	109	0	Running
30	41	5	Terry Labonte	Hendrick Motorsports	Chevrolet	109	0	Running
31	19	42	Jamie McMurray (R)	Chip Ganassi Racing	Dodge	109	0	Running
32	14	9	Bill Elliott (W)	Evernham Motorsports	Dodge	109	0	Running
33	33	74	Tony Raines (R)	BACE Motorsports	Chevrolet	109	0	Running
34	12	43	John Andretti	Petty Enterprises	Dodge	108	0	Flagged
35	34	33	Christian Fittipaldi (R)	Andy Petree Racing	Chevrolet	108	0	Flagged
36	2	8	Dale Earnhardt Jr.	Dale Earnhardt, Inc.	Chevrolet	108	22	Flagged
37	43	4	Mike Skinner	Morgan-McClure Motorsports	Pontiac	108	0	Flagged
38	17	22	Ward Burton (W)	Bill Davis Racing	Dodge	105	0	Accident
39	1	30	Jeff Green	Richard Childress Racing	Chevrolet	94	0	Accident
40	23	7	Jimmy Spencer	Ultra Motorsports	Dodge	94	0	Accident
41	22	18	Bobby Labonte	Joe Gibbs Racing	Chevrolet	81	0	Flagged
42	28	49	Ken Schrader	BAM Racing	Dodge	57	0	Accident
43	37	12	Ryan Newman	Penske Racing	Dodge	56	0	Accident
Failed to Qualify
		14	Larry Foyt (R)	A. J. Foyt Racing	Dodge			
		11	Brett Bodine	Brett Bodine Racing	Ford			
		02	Hermie Sadler (R)	SCORE Motorsports	Pontiac			
		60	David Green (R)	Hendrick Motorsports	Chevrolet			
		90	Kirk Shelmerdine (R)	Donlavey Racing	Ford			
		37	Derrike Cope (W)	Qwest Motor Racing	Chevrolet			
		78	Mike Harmon (R)	BC Motorsports	Chevrolet			

Withdrew: No. 84 – Norm Benning.

Previous race: 2003 Gatorade 125s (exhibition); 2002 Ford 400 (points)	Winston Cup Series; 2003 season	Next race: 2003 Subway 400
