= Tommy Baldwin Racing =

NASCAR team

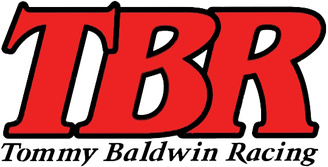
- Owner(s): Tommy Baldwin Jr. Beth Baldwin; Allan Heinke
- Base: Mooresville, North Carolina
- Series: NASCAR Whelen Modified Tour; SMART Modified Tour; CARS Pro Late Model Tour; Carolina Crate Modified Series
- Race drivers: Luke Baldwin; Jack Baldwin; Bryan Narducci
- Manufacturer: Chevrolet
- Opened: 2001
- Website: tommybaldwinracing.com

Career
- Debut: NASCAR Cup Series: 2009 Daytona 500 (Daytona); Nationwide Series: 2001 Little Trees 300 (Charlotte)
- Latest race: NASCAR Cup Series: 2020 Season Finale 500 (Phoenix); Nationwide Series; 2014 Ford EcoBoost 300 (Homestead)
- Races competed: Total: 475; NASCAR Cup Series: 425; Nationwide Series: 50
- Drivers' Championships: Total: 0 NASCAR Cup Series: 0 Xfinity Series: 0
- Race victories: Total: 0 NASCAR Cup Series: 0 Xfinity Series: 0
- Pole positions: Total: 0 NASCAR Cup Series: 0 Xfinity Series: 0

Tommy Baldwin Racing is an American professional stock car racing team that currently competes in the modified ranks. The team is based in Mooresville, North Carolina, and is owned by former crew chief Tommy Baldwin Jr., son of the late modified driver Tom Baldwin.

On October 19, 2016, it was rumored that TBR was selling their charter to Circle Sport – Leavine Family Racing, and possibly shut down after 2016. On Thursday, November 17, 2016, TBR announced that they would stop competing full-time in NASCAR, selling their charter. Despite the news, the team fielded the No. 7 Chevrolet SS for Elliott Sadler, J. J. Yeley, and Hermie Sadler in the Cup Series on a part-time basis, until the team was sold to Premium Motorsports. On November 26, 2018, TBR announced the rebirth of the team for 2019.

== NASCAR Cup Series ==
=== Car No. 7 history ===
No. 35 (2010–2011)

In 2010, Baldwin began fielding the number 35 car on a limited basis. Johnny Sauter attempted three races with the car; it did not qualify at California and at Martinsville but made the field at Phoenix. Aric Almirola unsuccessfully attempted Talladega as well.

In 2011, the No. 35 car ran the first Talladega race with former Cup winner Steve Park driving but retired from the race early. Park also attempted one more race in the No. 35, a fan sponsored tribute to modified driver Len Boehler. The Len Boehler tribute was originally planned for the Coke Zero 400 at Daytona but was moved to New Hampshire due to a lack of donations; the team also said that a Northeast track (where the Whelen Modified Tour runs) would be more suitable and had a larger fanbase. The 35 failed to qualify for Loudon. In June, 62-year-old Geoff Bodine was signed to run five races in the No. 35, with sponsorship backing from military health care provider Luke Associates. The scheduled races in the car were at Daytona, Charlotte, Talladega, Texas and Homestead. After having trouble qualifying, Bodine and Luke Associates moved over to the No. 36 team (with a guaranteed starting spot) while Dave Blaney would run the No. 35 in those races. Blaney also attempted the Watkins Glen race in the No. 35 while road course veteran Ron Fellows drove the No. 36. Blaney also ran the September Richmond race in the No. 35 with sponsorship from Pepsi Max, while Stephen Leicht drove the No. 36 in his first NASCAR race since 2009.

David Reutimann (2012)

For 2012, TBR reached an agreement with Stewart–Haas Racing, allowing SHR to field a No. 10 car for rookie Danica Patrick in 10 Sprint Cup races, beginning with the 2012 Daytona 500. For the remaining 26 races, David Reutimann was announced as the primary driver. A number of other drivers also ended up running in the No. 10, including road-course ringer Tomy Drissi at Sonoma, Tony Raines when Reutimann substituted for Kurt Busch at Pocono, and J. J. Yeley. Patrick brought sponsorship from GoDaddy.com, with Reutimann's primary partners being Accell Construction and TMone. For 2013, TBR would keep all rights to the team, including owner's points, however, the No. 10 and GoDaddy would follow Patrick to SHR.

Dave Blaney (2013)

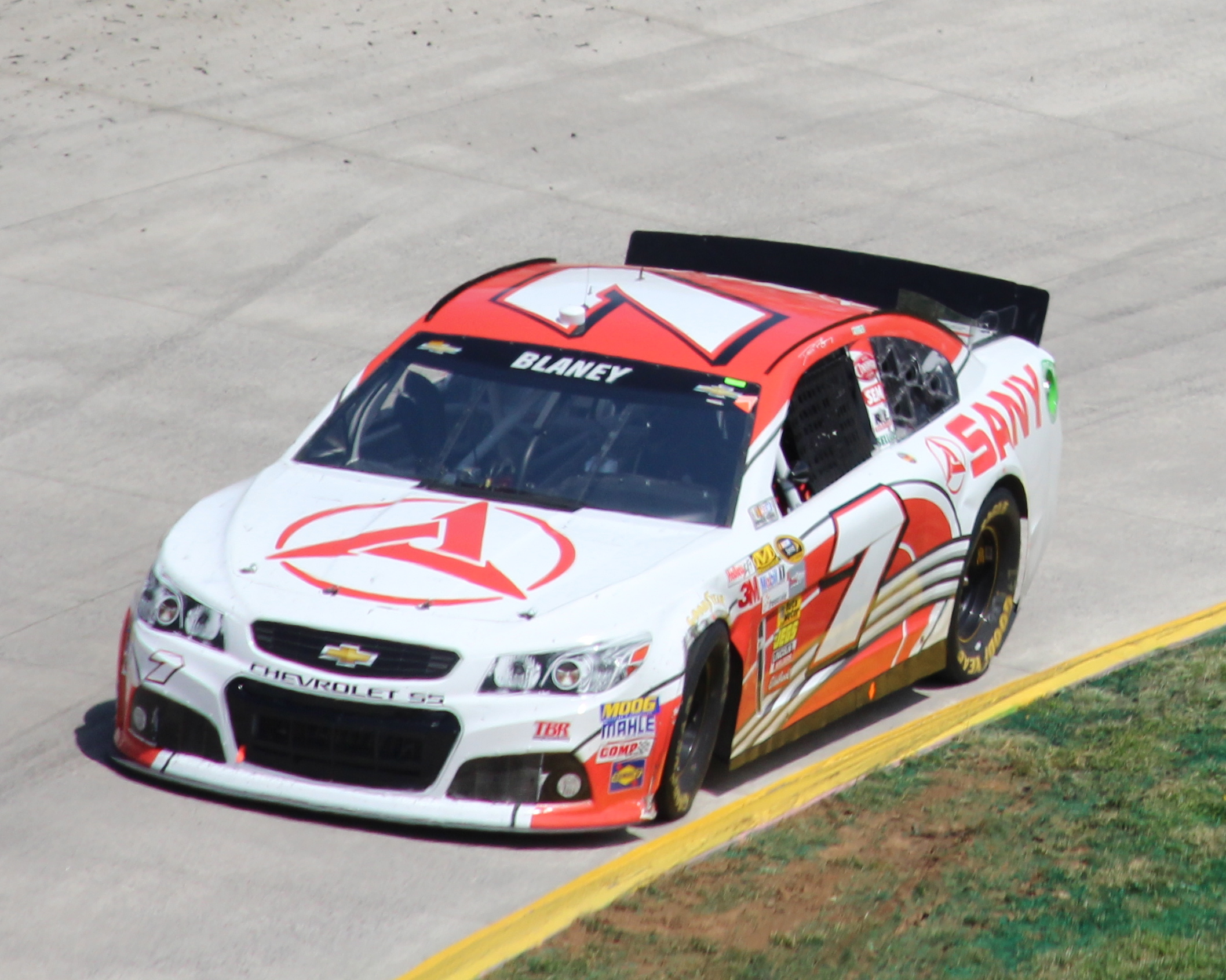
The No. 7 SANY Chevrolet driven by Dave Blaney at Martinsville Speedway in 2013.

For 2013, TBR changed the car number from No. 10 to No. 7 in honor of team owner Tommy Baldwin's father, who used the number 7NY during his days in NASCAR's Modified division. Heavy-machinery manufacturer SANY America sponsored the No. 7 team in 14 races, while Florida Lottery sponsored both Daytona races and Homestead. Blaney moved from the No. 36 car to run the No. 7 for the majority of the season, while Justin Marks made his Cup Series debut in the No. 7 at Sonoma with sponsorship from GoPro.

Michael Annett (2014)

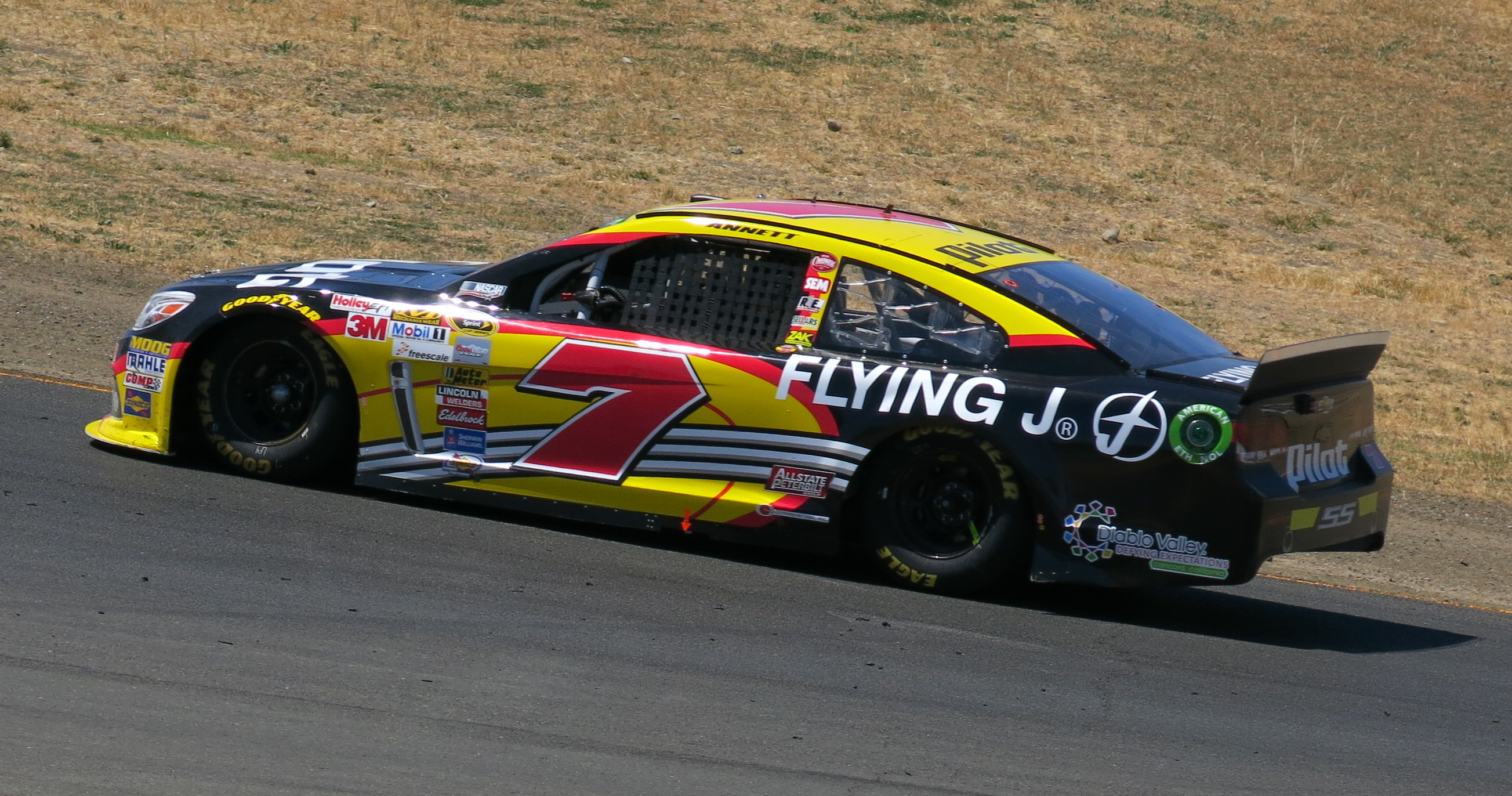
Annett at Sonoma Raceway in 2014

In 2014, the No. 7 was driven by rookie Michael Annett, bringing his longtime sponsor Pilot Flying J up from the Nationwide Series. Part-time primary sponsors included longtime TBR sponsors Accell Construction for six races, Golden Corral at Loudon and Talladega in the fall, and new sponsor Allstate Peterbuilt. The No. 7 would also utilize an engine-leasing program with ECR Engines. Annett finished 33rd in the 2014 final point standings with a best finish of 16th at Talladega Superspeedway in the spring, with the team also finishing 33rd in final owner points. Annett and Pilot Flying J did not return for 2015, moving to a new second entry at HScott Motorsports.

Alex Bowman (2015)

In 2015, it was announced that Alex Bowman would depart BK Racing in order to join TBR. The team failed to make the Daytona 500 after wrecking in the duel, the first time that any TBR entry had failed to make the Great American Race. Bowman was signed to drive for 2016 but parted ways with the team on January 21.

Regan Smith (2016)

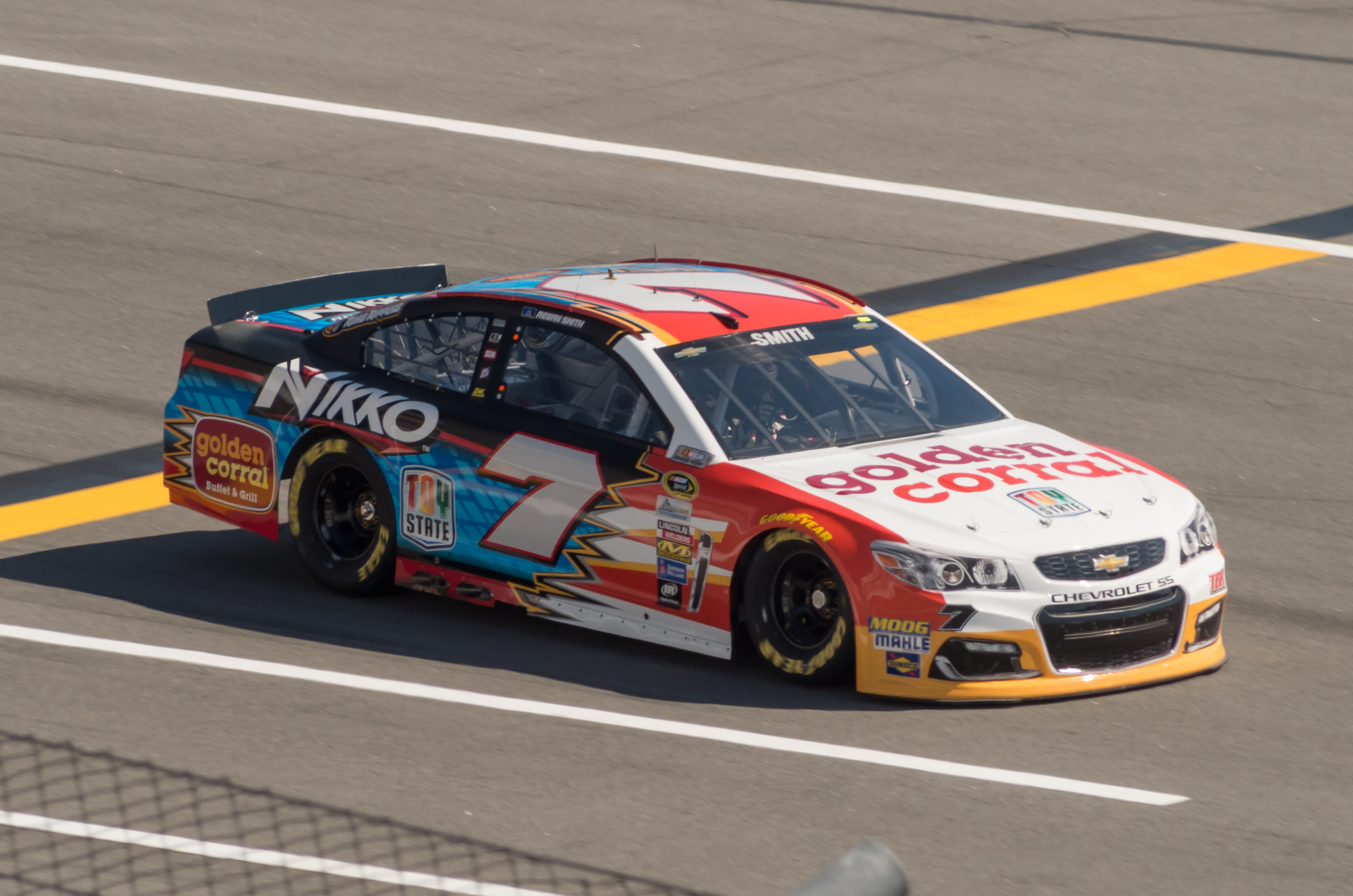
Regan Smith at Daytona International Speedway in 2016

A few hours after Bowman left, Regan Smith joined the team full time driving the No. 7 Chevy, replacing Bowman. Smith had a good start, finishing 8th in the Daytona 500, thus allowing a "Kids Eat Free" campaign to happen the next day, as the car had Golden Corral sponsorship.

Regan Smith, after a dismal season, rebounded at the second Pocono event when he finished 3rd after not pitting during the final 28 laps. It was a season-best finish for both him and Tommy Baldwin Racing, as well as the best finish for the team in the team's history.

Before the race at Homestead–Miami Speedway, Tommy Baldwin announced on Facebook that Tommy Baldwin Racing would shut down their Cup operation after the 2016 season. Their charter was sold to Leavine Family Racing, forcing Smith to qualify on speed. Their last finish was a 38th-place finish at Homestead-Miami Speedway.

Part-time (2017)

Despite the announcement, the team partnered with Elliott Sadler to compete in the 2017 Daytona 500 and the other superspeedways. J. J. Yeley drove the car at the spring Texas race, and at Charlotte in May, Yeley returned to the #7 in the Brickyard 400. It was then announced Hermie Sadler would drive the car at Martinsville. On September 4, 2017, Tommy Baldwin Racing was officially acquired by Premium Motorsports. The team ran other races near the end of the season under the Premium Motorsports banner, with the first being with Justin Marks at Talladega.

Part Time (2020)

On May 11, 2020, Tommy Baldwin Racing announced that Josh Bilicki would be driving the number 7 car at the Real Heroes 400. JJ Yeley, Josh Bilicki and Reed Sorenson both ran 2 races, with Yeley having the team's best finish: 25th at Bristol Motor Speedway. After the 2020 season, Baldwin allowed Spire Motorsports use of the No. 7 for the 2021 season. TBR would not return to the No. 7.

==== Car No. 7 results ====
Year	Driver	No.	Make	1	2	3	4	5	6	7	8	9	10	11	12	13	14	15	16	17	18	19	20	21	22	23	24	25	26	27	28	29	30	31	32	33	34	35	36	Owners	Pts
2010	Johnny Sauter	35	Chevy	DAY	CAL; DNQ	LVS	ATL	BRI	MAR; DNQ	PHO; 41	TEX																													52nd	121
2010	Aric Almirola	35	Chevy									TAL; DNQ	RCH	DAR	DOV	CLT	POC	MCH	SON	NHA	DAY	CHI	IND	POC																52nd	121
2010	Tony Ave^{1}	35	Chevy																						GLN; DNQ	MCH	BRI	ATL	RCH	NHA	DOV	KAN	CAL	CLT	MAR	TAL	TEX	PHO	HOM	52nd	121
2011	Steve Park	35	Chevy	DAY	PHO	LVS	BRI	CAL	MAR	TEX	TAL; 42	RCH	DAR	DOV	CLT	KAN	POC	MCH	SON												NHA; DNQ	DOV	KAN							44th	75
2011	Geoff Bodine	35	Chevy																	DAY; 38	KEN	NHA	IND	POC; DNQ				ATL; DNQ						CLT; DNQ	TAL; DNQ	MAR				44th	75
2011	Dave Blaney	35	Chevy																						GLN; DNQ	MCH	BRI		RCH; 19								TEX; 35	PHO; 27	HOM; 28	44th	75
2011	Stephen Leicht	35	Chevy																											CHI; DNQ										44th	75
2012	Danica Patrick^{2}	10	Chevy	DAY; 38										DAR; 31	CLT; 30												BRI; 29	ATL; 29		CHI; 25		DOV; 28			KAN; 32		TEX; 24	PHO; 17		33rd	519
2012	David Reutimann	10	Chevy		PHO; 36	LVS; 31	BRI; 21	CAL; 27	MAR; 35	TEX; 26	KAN; 29	RCH; 33	TAL; 22			DOV; 31				KEN; 23	DAY; 11	NHA; 33		POC; 24		MCH; 21			RCH; 34		NHA; 30		TAL; 37	CLT; 30		MAR; 36			HOM; 34	33rd	519
2012	Dave Blaney	10	Chevy														POC; 25																							33rd	519
2012	Tony Raines	10	Chevy															MCH; 36																						33rd	519
2012	Tomy Drissi	10	Chevy																SON; 38																					33rd	519
2012	J. J. Yeley	10	Chevy																				IND; 39		GLN; 40															33rd	519
2013	Dave Blaney	7	Chevy	DAY; 17	PHO; 33	LVS; 24	BRI; 36	CAL; 21	MAR; 29	TEX; 25	KAN; 43	RCH; 23	TAL; 16	DAR; 27	CLT; 30	DOV; 29	POC; 31	MCH; 31		KEN; 40	DAY; 31	NHA; 23	IND; 38	POC; 23	GLN; 27	MCH; 30	BRI; 22	ATL; 26	RCH; 31	CHI; 23	NHA; 31	DOV; 33	KAN; 25	CLT; 32	TAL; 25	MAR; 39	TEX; 35	PHO; 30	HOM; 38	28th	646
2013	Justin Marks	7	Chevy																SON; 30																					28th	646
2014	Michael Annett	7	Chevy	DAY; 37	PHO; 34	LVS; 29	BRI; 26	CAL; 19	MAR; 31	TEX; 29	DAR; 42	RCH; 33	TAL; 16	KAN; 25	CLT; 28	DOV; 35	POC; 20	MCH; 21	SON; 30	KEN; 18	DAY; 21	NHA; 32	IND; 31	POC; 22	GLN; 31	MCH; 40	BRI; 38	ATL; 21	RCH; 37	CHI; 40	NHA; 29	DOV; 41	KAN; 24	CLT; 33	TAL; 37	MAR; 24	TEX; 22	PHO; 26	HOM; 36	33rd	531
2015	Alex Bowman	7	Chevy	DAY; DNQ	ATL; 23	LVS; 43	PHO; 30	CAL; 33	MAR; 37	TEX; 33	BRI; 20	RCH; 32	TAL; 16	KAN; 43	CLT; 26	DOV; 20	POC; 26	MCH; 41	SON; 31	DAY; 24	KEN; 31	NHA; 42	IND; 43	POC; 25	GLN; 29	MCH; 31	BRI; 32	DAR; 24	RCH; 37	CHI; 37	NHA; 42	DOV; 32	CLT; 32	KAN; 31	TAL; 33	MAR; 22	TEX; 41	PHO; 38	HOM; 26	36th	437
2016	Regan Smith	7	Chevy	DAY; 8	ATL; 34	LVS; 25	PHO; 28	CAL; 23	MAR; 34	TEX; 31	BRI; 37	RCH; 32	TAL; 32	KAN; 23	DOV; 39	CLT; 28	POC; 22	MCH; 35	SON; 28	DAY; 38	KEN; 34	NHA; 32	IND; 26	POC; 3	GLN; 35	BRI; 26	MCH; 26	DAR; 20	RCH; 29	CHI; QL^{‡}	NHA; 34	DOV; 31	CLT; 21	KAN; 29	TAL; 25	MAR; 30	TEX; 26	PHO; 27	HOM; 38	45th^{3}	3^{3}
2016	Ty Dillon	7	Chevy																											CHI; 27										45th^{3}	3^{3}
2017	Elliott Sadler	7	Chevy	DAY; 20	ATL	LVS	PHO	CAL	MAR				TAL; 17	KAN						DAY; 21	KEN	NHA																		39th	98
2017	J. J. Yeley	7	Chevy							TEX; 27	BRI	RCH			CLT; 26	DOV	POC	MCH	SON				IND; 37	POC	GLN	MCH	BRI; 30	DAR	RCH	CHI	NHA	DOV	CLT							39th	98
2017	Justin Marks^{4}	7	Chevy																															TAL; 40	KAN					39th	98
2017	Hermie Sadler^{4}	7	Chevy																																	MAR; 34				39th	98
2017	Joey Gase^{4}	7	Chevy																																		TEX; 32	PHO; 30		39th	98
2017	Ross Chastain^{4}	7	Chevy																																				HOM; Wth	39th	98
2020	Josh Bilicki	7	Chevy	DAY	LVS	CAL	PHO	DAR; 34	DAR		CLT; 36						POC; 32	POC; 34	IND; 25	KEN					MCH; 33				DAY; 38	DAR; 32	RCH	BRI; 39	LVS	TAL	CLT	KAN; 35	TEX; 29	MAR; 32		39th	85
2020	J. J. Yeley	7	Chevy							CLT; 37		BRI; 25																												39th	85
2020	Reed Sorenson	7	Chevy										ATL; 27	MAR; 38	HOM	TAL					TEX; 28	KAN; 31	NHA			DAY														39th	85
2020	Joey Gase	7	Chevy																					MCH; 39																39th	85
2020	Garrett Smithley	7	Chevy																								DOV; 37	DOV; 35											PHO; 37	39th	85
^{‡} - Qualified but replaced by Ty Dillon

- Tony Ave's entry was fielded by TriStar Motorsports.
- Danica Patrick's entries were fielded by Stewart–Haas Racing.
- Owner Points sold to Leavine Family Racing before the race at Homestead.
- Justin Marks, Hermie Sadler and Joey Gase ran under Premium Motorsports banner.

=== Car No. 36 history ===
Multiple drivers (2009–2010)

Formerly a Busch Series team, on January 5, 2009, Tommy Baldwin Jr. announced that he would restart TBR as a Sprint Cup Series operation despite the slumping economy and following his release as a crew chief from the defunct Bill Davis Racing team. The team later announced that former Evernham Motorsports and Haas CNC Racing driver Scott Riggs would drive the No. 36, and that Arrington Manufacturing (now Race Engines Plus) would build Toyota engines for the team. Initially made up of volunteers laid off from other organizations, the team qualified for the Daytona 500 and would finish 25th. The team was sponsored by Red Bank Outfitters for the first four races, and would receive short term sponsorship from Array/Nexxus Lighting and Guy Fieri Knuckle Sandwich, though it ran much of the season unsponsored. Riggs would also qualify for the second race of the year but did not qualify for the next three events. After qualifying for eight races in twelve attempts, Riggs announced he would leave the team after Charlotte, when lack of funding forced the team to start and park. Baldwin then signed veteran Mike Skinner to drive for 17 races, Patrick Carpentier for both Pocono races, and Brian Simo for both road course races. Robert Richardson Jr. finished 18th at the November Talladega race with sponsorship from Mahindra Tractors. It was announced in September that Carpentier would run six additional races beginning at Atlanta with sponsor Wave Energy Drink. After failing to qualify for the Atlanta race, Carpentier left the team in due to a business conflict in Canada. Michael McDowell would take over for the remainder of the season.

In 2010, veteran Mike Bliss was hired to drive the No. 36 for TBR with Wave Energy Drink returning to sponsor the team in 14 races. TBR also switched manufacturers from Toyota to Chevrolet in 2010, using Earnhardt-Childress Engines. At Las Vegas in February, the team was sponsored by Kim Kardashian's Sephora perfume. Bliss and Baldwin parted ways in April after the team failed to qualify for two of the first seven races. Johnny Sauter drove at Texas and Talladega. Casey Mears then took over the No. 36 ride and qualified for the Richmond race while failing to qualify at Darlington. Sauter returned to the No. 36 at Dover while Mears went to Team Red Bull as a replacement for Brian Vickers. Geoff Bodine made his first race since 2004 when he drove the car at Pocono. Steve Park also made his first Cup start since 2003, finishing 13th in his first Cup Series race at Daytona. It was announced on June 16, 2010, that Mears will return to the No. 36 following his release from Red Bull. Ron Fellows drove the car at the road course race in Watkins Glen, New York. Dave Blaney and J. J. Yeley also ran races in the car.

Dave Blaney (2011–2012)

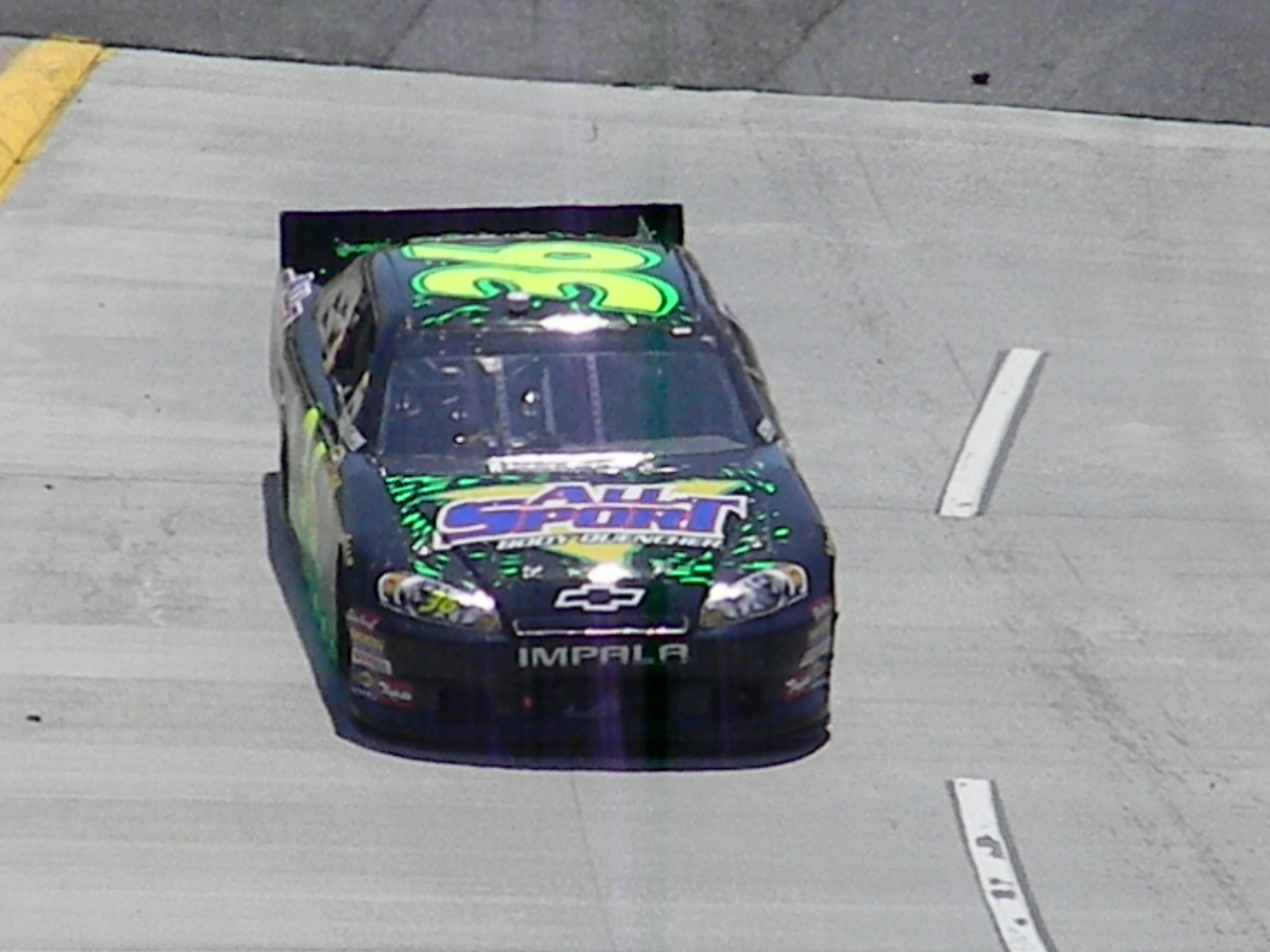
Dave Blaney at Martinsville in 2011.

For 2011, TBR signed Dave Blaney, who Baldwin had worked with at Bill Davis Racing, to drive the No. 36 for the full season. The team planned to attempt every race and complete a minimum of sixteen events (as opposed to starting-and-parking) depending on sponsorship. The team started the season with no primary sponsor and went to Daytona Speedweeks with an unsponsored black Chevrolet, but received 11th hour sponsorship from Golden Corral after the No. 36 made its third consecutive Daytona 500. Blaney led three laps and finished 26th after taking damage from a lap 196 wreck. Oklahoma-based Accell Construction became a 6-race sponsor for the team. All Sport later sponsored the car at Martinsville. The team suffered misfortune again at the April Talladega race when Blaney nearly spun out while at the front. He salvaged a 27th-place finish after leading 21 laps. Golden Corral later stepped up as a 19-race primary sponsor while All Sport's sister brand Big Red joined the team for 5. The team elected to skip the exhibition race at Charlotte to work on improving the team and preparing for the upcoming points races. Ron Fellows returned to the team at Watkins Glen in August. At the rain-delayed September race in Atlanta, Mike Skinner drove the 36 after Blaney developed a case of kidney stones. Blaney started and parked for Germain Racing's No. 60, while Skinner drove the 36 to a 27th-place finish. At Richmond, Stephen Leicht drove the 36 in his return to Cup. For the final three races of 2011, Blaney moved to the No. 35 and Geoff Bodine moved to the No. 36. Following a 13th-place finish at the April 2011 Richmond race with Leicht, the No. 36 moved into the Top 35 for the first time in team history. The team recorded its best finish to date with a third at the October 2011 Talladega race with Dave Blaney, and 2011 marked the first year the team competed in all 36 races.

For 2012, the No. 36 team returned full-time with Blaney behind the wheel, with Ryan Pemberton joining the team as crew chief. The team lost most of its sponsorship from the prior year, with Ollie's Bargain Outlet coming on for four of the first six races. The No. 36 teams owners points were also transferred to the No. 10 car for the season, leaving the team with the 44th-place points from the No. 35 car which would not guarantee a spot in the first five races. The team nearly won the Daytona 500, staying out under caution to gain the lead before the race was red-flagged when Juan Pablo Montoya's car collided with a jet-dryer cleanup vehicle, damaging the racetrack. The race was ultimately restarted, with Blaney scoring a solid 15th-place finish. The team would later sign SealWrap, a partner of Dave and son Ryan Blaney, and Widow Wax for eight races, while Golden Corral would return for the remaining three restrictor plate races. Blaney earned the No. 36 team a spot in the Top 35 after five races. Though the team had to start and park several events, they remained in the top 35 throughout the entirety of the season. Tony Raines and J. J. Yeley would run single races in the car, while Blaney was in the No. 37 car.

J. J. Yeley (2013)

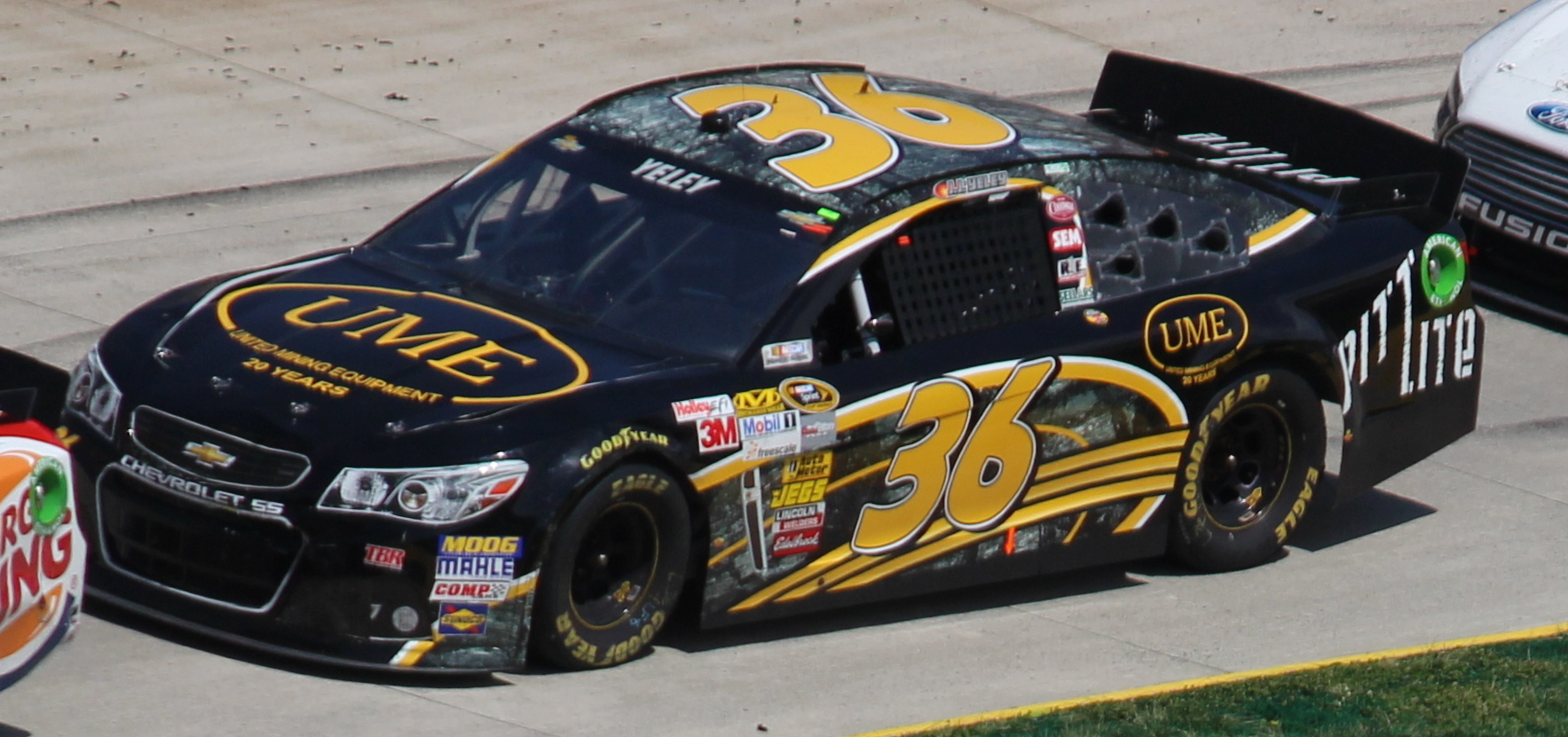
J.J. Yeley in The team's No. 36 car in 2013

In the 2013 season, TBR originally planned to run as a one-car team with the No. 7 team running full-time. This changed, however, when the team was able to round up enough sponsorship for the No. 36 car to run a full schedule. J. J. Yeley ran the No. 36 car with sponsorship from numerous companies including Golden Corral, United Mining Equipment, Pitt Lite, Accell Construction, and others. Victor Gonzalez Jr. drove the No. 36 at Sonoma and Watkins Glen with sponsorship from IMCA Dominican Republic and Mobil 1. Gonzalez would become the first competitor from the Caribbean region to compete in NASCAR's top division. Yeley finished 32nd in points in 2013 but recorded a tenth-place finish at the Daytona 500, his first top ten since 2008 and his best finish in the race to date.

Reed Sorenson (2014)

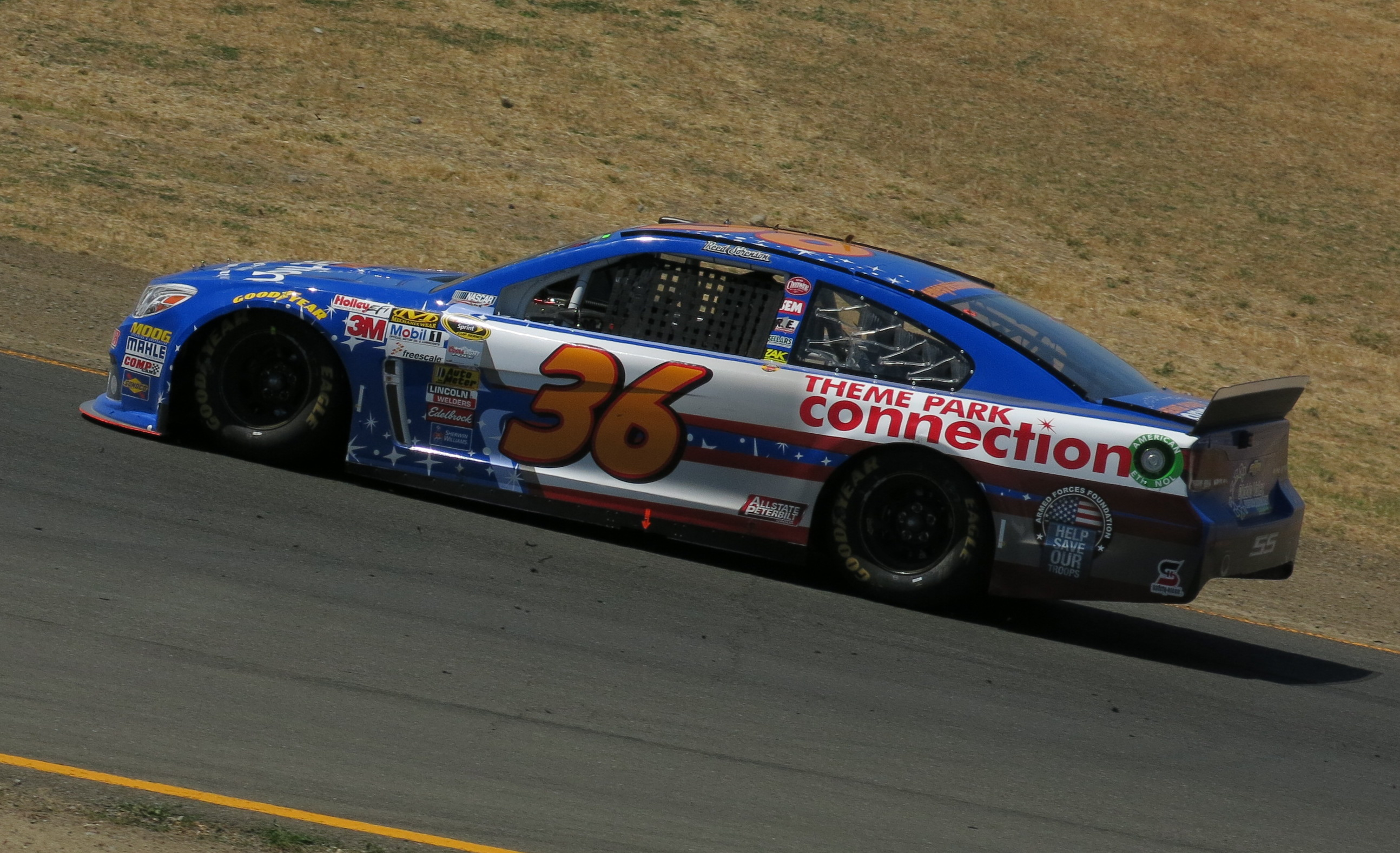
Reed Sorenson at Sonoma Raceway in 2014

For 2014, Yeley was replaced by Reed Sorenson, and veteran crew chief Todd Parrott was brought in to improve the performance of the team. Golden Corral returned once again for the superspeedways with their "Top 10 Kids Eat Free" promotion, with Zing Zang, Flasr, Theme Park Connection, and the Delaware "Click It or Ticket" program sponsoring select races. The highlight of the season was when Sorenson qualified second at the July Daytona race after a rain-abbreviated qualifying session. Due to lack of consistent funding outside of restrictor plate races, the team's performance slumped significantly behind the No. 7 team, forced to use their Pro Motor Engines for multiple consecutive races and skipping practice sessions to save tires and part wear. Perhaps the team's most notable moment in 2014 came at the spring Richmond race. Sorenson blew a tire, which then unwound with the rubber cords striking various components inside the wheel well, causing a small fire. However, the fire would eventually reach the fuel cell causing the car to burst into flames as Sorenson eased it onto pit road, he brought it to a stop, where crew members from Go Fas Racing and Hendrick Motorsports rushed to quickly get Sorenson out of the car. Sorenson was uninjured. Sorenson finished the 2014 season in 34th in the final driver standings, with the best finish of 14th, while the 36 team finished 35th in the owner standings.

After the season, TBR sold the owner's points and equipment of the No. 36 team to Jay Robinson Racing (reorganized as Premium Motorsports) due to lack of sponsorship, and contracted to one full-time team. Because of the move, Reed Sorenson was released, and sponsor Zing Zang retracted their planned five-race sponsorship for 2015 (due to their desire to sponsor Sorenson).

==== Car No. 36 results ====
Year	Driver	No.	Make	1	2	3	4	5	6	7	8	9	10	11	12	13	14	15	16	17	18	19	20	21	22	23	24	25	26	27	28	29	30	31	32	33	34	35	36	Owners	Pts
2009	Scott Riggs	36	Toyota	DAY; 25	CAL; 36	LVS; DNQ	ATL; DNQ	BRI; DNQ	MAR; 30	TEX; DNQ	PHO; 36	TAL; 41	RCH; 42	DAR; 39	CLT; 38																									41st	1499
2009	Mike Skinner	36	Toyota													DOV; 41		MCH; DNQ				CHI; 39	IND; 41			MCH; 41	BRI; DNQ													41st	1499
2009	Patrick Carpentier	36	Toyota														POC; 43			NHA; 43	DAY; 42			POC; 37				ATL; DNQ												41st	1499
2009	Brian Simo	36	Toyota																SON; DNQ						GLN; DNQ															41st	1499
2009	Michael McDowell	36	Toyota																										RCH; 41	NHA; 41	DOV; 38	KAN; DNQ	CAL; 40	CLT; DNQ	MAR; 41		TEX; 41	PHO; 41	HOM; 43	41st	1499
2009	Robert Richardson Jr.	36	Toyota																																	TAL; 18				41st	1499
2010	Mike Bliss	36	Chevy	DAY; 42	CAL; 22	LVS; 39	ATL; 24	BRI; DNQ	MAR; 25	PHO; DNQ																														40th	1737
2010	Johnny Sauter	36	Chevy								TEX; DNQ	TAL; 41			DOV; 43	CLT; 41		MCH; DNQ																						40th	1737
2010	Casey Mears	36	Chevy										RCH; 26	DAR; DNQ						NHA; 29		CHI; 40	IND; DNQ	POC; 36		MCH; DNQ														40th	1737
2010	Geoff Bodine	36	Chevy														POC; 41																							40th	1737
2010	Brian Simo	36	Chevy																SON; DNQ																					40th	1737
2010	Steve Park	36	Chevy																		DAY; 13																			40th	1737
2010	Ron Fellows	36	Chevy																						GLN; 40															40th	1737
2010	Dave Blaney	36	Chevy																								BRI; DNQ		RCH; 30	NHA; 31	DOV; 43				MAR; 36	TAL; 42		PHO; 37		40th	1737
2010	J. J. Yeley	36	Chevy																									ATL; 40				KAN; 42	CAL; 42	CLT; 43			TEX; DNQ		HOM; 42	40th	1737
2011	Dave Blaney	36	Chevy	DAY; 26	PHO; 42	LVS; 34	BRI; 25	CAL; 37	MAR; 30	TEX; 30	TAL; 27	RCH; 13	DAR; 24	DOV; 26	CLT; 27	KAN; 32	POC; 26	MCH; 34	SON; 31	DAY; 39	KEN; 33	NHA; 29	IND; 31	POC; 30		MCH; 33	BRI; 35			CHI; 33	NHA; 35	DOV; 32	KAN; 31	CLT; 35	TAL; 3	MAR; 23				33rd	519
2011	Ron Fellows	36	Chevy																						GLN; 30															33rd	519
2011	Mike Skinner	36	Chevy																									ATL; 27												33rd	519
2011	Stephen Leicht	36	Chevy																										RCH; 24											33rd	519
2011	Geoff Bodine	36	Chevy																																		TEX; 38	PHO; 37	HOM; 30	33rd	519
2012	Dave Blaney	36	Chevy	DAY; 15	PHO; 23	LVS; 29	BRI; 34	CAL; 33	MAR; 34	TEX; 37	KAN; 37	RCH; 29	TAL; 30	DAR; 27	CLT; 40	DOV; 32		MCH; 25	SON; 37	KEN; 35	DAY; 22	NHA; 39	IND; 23		GLN; 36	MCH; 38	BRI; 26	ATL; 25	RCH; 33	CHI; 33			TAL; 39	CLT; 43	KAN; 39	MAR; 35	TEX; 39	PHO; 26	HOM; 32	35th	427
2012	Tony Raines	36	Chevy														POC; 32							POC; 38							NHA; 40									35th	427
2012	J. J. Yeley	36	Chevy																													DOV; 34								35th	427
2013	J. J. Yeley	36	Chevy	DAY; 10	PHO; 28	LVS; 36	BRI; 27	CAL; 27	MAR; 27	TEX; 39	KAN; 35	RCH; 32	TAL; 31	DAR; 35	CLT; 28	DOV; 30	POC; 39	MCH; 24		KEN; 32	DAY; 13	NHA; 39	IND; 39	POC; 25		MCH; 43	BRI; 24	ATL; 30	RCH; 36	CHI; 25	NHA; 33	DOV; 34	KAN; 27	CLT; 43	TAL; 28	MAR; 30	TEX; 30	PHO; 29	HOM; 32	32nd	540
2013	Victor Gonzalez Jr.	36	Chevy																SON; 37						GLN; 41															32nd	540
2014	Reed Sorenson	36	Chevy	DAY; 16	PHO; 31	LVS; 34	BRI; 28	CAL; 21	MAR; 34	TEX; 33	DAR; 39	RCH; 42	TAL; 34	KAN; 32	CLT; 42	DOV; 24	POC; 34	MCH; 32	SON; 32	KEN; 27	DAY; 33	NHA; 33	IND; 38	POC; 27	GLN; 23	MCH; 27	BRI; 24	ATL; 29	RCH; 24	CHI; 29	NHA; 31	DOV; 32	KAN; 26	CLT; 27	TAL; 14	MAR; 35	TEX; 33	PHO; 28	HOM; 24	35th	516

=== Car No. 37 History ===
In mid-2012, TBR announced a partnership to provide technical assistance and cars to former driver Larry Gunselman's Max Q Motorsports. Max Q had started the year with Mike Wallace (1 race) and Timmy Hill drivers in a partnership with Rick Ware Racing, but Hill struggled to qualify for races leading Max Q to break off the partnership in April and sending Hill back to RWR in the Nationwide Series. J. J. Yeley was hired by TBR to drive for Max Q. Regular TBR driver Dave Blaney also ran one race for Max Q. Yeley moved to TBR's No. 36 car in 2013, while Max Q shut down.

At the 2013 Sonoma race, with Yeley's usual No. 36 being piloted by Victor Gonzalez Jr. for the weekend, TBR used its partnership to field the No. 37 for him with Gunselman listed as an owner. The team was a late entry, however, with neither Yeley or the No. 37 team receiving points for the race, as the No. 37 car started last and finished 42nd.

In 2014, TBR took full ownership of the No. 37, fielding it as a third team starting at Indianapolis. 2000 Champion Bobby Labonte drove the first race for the team at the Brickyard with longtime TBR supporter Accell Construction. Labonte failed to qualify on speed, using a champion's provisional to make the race. The next week at Pocono, Dave Blaney returned to the team for the first time since entering semi-retirement. The No. 37 also ran with Blaney at Michigan and Bristol. Former TBR driver Mike Bliss drove the No. 37 at Atlanta and Richmond. The team ran a total of ten races with those three drivers, finishing the season 46th in owners points. Their best finish of 26th came at Pocono with Blaney driving. The team shut down following the season.

==== Car No. 37 results ====
Year	Driver	No.	Make	1	2	3	4	5	6	7	8	9	10	11	12	13	14	15	16	17	18	19	20	21	22	23	24	25	26	27	28	29	30	31	32	33	34	35	36	Owners	Pts
2013	J. J. Yeley	37	Chevy	DAY	PHO	LVS	BRI	CAL	MAR	TEX	KAN	RCH	TAL	DAR	CLT	DOV	POC	MCH	SON; 42	KEN	DAY	NHA	IND	POC	GLN	MCH	BRI	ATL	RCH	CHI	NHA	DOV	KAN	CLT	TAL	MAR	TEX	PHO	HOM	50th	0
2014	Bobby Labonte	37	Chevy	DAY	PHO	LVS	BRI	CAL	MAR	TEX	DAR	RCH	TAL	KAN	CLT	DOV	POC	MCH	SON	KEN	DAY	NHA	IND; 37																	46th	58
2014	Dave Blaney	37	Chevy																					POC; 26	GLN	MCH; 33	BRI; 43													46th	58
2014	Mike Bliss	37	Chevy																									ATL; 43	RCH; 35	CHI; 43	NHA	DOV; 36	KAN; 43	CLT	TAL	MAR	TEX	PHO; 43	HOM	46th	58

=== Car No. 71 history ===
It was announced that TBR will come back to race in 2019 part-time with the number 71. Their first race was scheduled to be the Daytona 500 with Ryan Truex driving, but he failed to qualify for it. The 71 team has not attempted a race since. After using the No. 7 in 2020, the team announced that they would use No. 71 for the 2021 season after Spire Motorsports requested use of the No. 7. However, the team would never make an attempt.

==== Car No. 71 results ====
Year	Team	No.	Make	1	2	3	4	5	6	7	8	9	10	11	12	13	14	15	16	17	18	19	20	21	22	23	24	25	26	27	28	29	30	31	32	33	34	35	36	MENCC	Pts	Ref
2019	Ryan Truex	71	Chevy	DAY; DNQ	ATL	LVS	PHO	CAL	MAR	TEX	BRI	RCH	TAL	DOV	KAN	CLT	POC	MCH	SON	CHI	DAY	KEN	NHA	POC	GLN	MCH	BRI	DAR	IND	LVS	RCH	CLT	DOV	TAL	KAN	MAR	TEX	PHO	HOM	47th	0	

== Nationwide Series ==
TBR made its official debut in 2001 at Charlotte. Ward Burton started 4th and finished 8th in the No. 5 Pillsbury Chevrolet. Burton ran the same car at Homestead-Miami Speedway, qualifying 6th and finishing 7th. The next year the team would switch its number and manufacturer. The team fielded the No. 6 Pepsi Dodge driven by Wally Dallenbach Jr. Dallenbach would start 26th and finish 14th in the team's first race. Dallenbach scored two top tens at Charlotte and Phoenix. Damon Lusk would take over the No. 6 car starting at Richmond but crashed out of the 14th lap. Despite the rocky start, Lusk and TBR would make a run for Rookie of the Year in 2003, with sponsorship from Sta-Rite Pumps. Lusk had a consistent season with only 2 DNFs but would lose out on ROTY to David Stremme and Coy Gibbs.

The following year, Unilever backed TBR, and subsequently announced its Hungry Drivers program. Unilever would select four drivers and run each of them in three Busch Series races. The chosen drivers were Mark McFarland, Tracy Hines, Scott Lynch, and Paul Wolfe. Wolfe was eventually chosen after scoring two top-20 finishes. In 2005, TBR's Busch Series team was bought out by Evernham Motorsports (now Richard Petty Motorsports) and TBR closed up its team.

=== Car No. 6 results ===
Year	Driver	No.	Make	1	2	3	4	5	6	7	8	9	10	11	12	13	14	15	16	17	18	19	20	21	22	23	24	25	26	27	28	29	30	31	32	33	34	Owners	Pts
2001	Ward Burton	5	Chevy	DAY	CAR	LVS	ATL	DAR	BRI	TEX	NSH	TAL	CAL	RCH	NHA	NZH	CLT	DOV	KEN	MLW	GLN	CHI	GTY	PPR	IRP	MCH	BRI	DAR	RCH	DOV	KAN	CLT; 8	MEM	PHO	CAR	HOM; 7		70th	288
2002	David Green	6	Dodge	DAY; 18	CAR	LVS	DAR	BRI	TEX	NSH	TAL	CAL	RCH	NHA	NZH	CLT	DOV	NSH	KEN	MLW	DAY	CHI	GTY	PPR	IRP													45th	766
2002	Wally Dallenbach Jr.	6	Dodge																							MCH; 14	BRI	DAR				CLT; 7	MEM			PHO; 9	HOM	45th	766
2002	Damon Lusk	6	Dodge																										RCH; 42	DOV	KAN			ATL; 22	CAR			45th	766
2003	Damon Lusk	6	Dodge	DAY; 21	CAR	LVS; 22	DAR		TEX; 43	TAL	NSH	CAL; 24	RCH	GTY	NZH	CLT; 29	DOV	NSH	KEN	MLW; 31	DAY; 21	CHI	NHA; 18	PPR	IRP	MCH; 12					KAN; 28	CLT	MEM					39th	1319
2003	Jimmy Spencer	6	Dodge					BRI; 24																														39th	1319
2003	Ted Musgrave	6	Dodge																								BRI; 3	DAR	RCH									39th	1319
2003	Paul Wolfe	6	Dodge																											DOV; 16				ATL; 19	PHO	CAR	HOM	39th	1319
2004	Paul Wolfe	6	Dodge	DAY; 36	CAR; DNQ	LVS; 18	DAR	BRI															NHA; 12	PPR	IRP													42nd	1256
2004	Tracy Hines	6	Dodge						TEX; 20	NSH	TAL; 25															MCH; 17	BRI	CAL										42nd	1256
2004	Jeremy Mayfield	6	Dodge									CAL; 18	GTY																									42nd	1256
2004	Scott Lynch	6	Dodge											RCH; 39	NZH																	CLT; DNQ						42nd	1256
2004	Mark McFarland	6	Dodge													CLT; 22	DOV; 23	NSH	KEN	MLW	DAY	CHI							RCH; 16	DOV	KAN							42nd	1256
2004	Bill Elliott	6	Dodge																														MEM; 20					42nd	1256
2004	Randy LaJoie	6	Dodge																															ATL; 32	PHO	DAR	HOM	42nd	1256

=== Car No. 36 history ===
In 2012, Baldwin announced his return to the Nationwide Series. The team will run the No. 36 Chevrolet in eight races for drivers Ryan Blaney (son of then-TBR Cup Series driver Dave), Ryan Truex, and Bobby Santos III. TBR's first attempt of the 2012 season was at Daytona in February with Truex driving the No. 36. The team picked up a last-minute sponsorship from Grime Boss for the event. Ryan Blaney then took over driving duties at Richmond in his first of six races with the team. Long-time sponsor of the Blaney family, SealWrap, sponsored all six Ryan Blaney's attempts. TBR once again ran the No. 36 at Daytona in July for Whelen Modified driver and 2010 NWMT series champion Bobby Santos III. Brad Parrott was the crew chief for the team.

For 2013, the car changed numbers to No. 8, absorbing the points from Team SLR. Brad Parrott remained TBR's crew chief. Scott Lagasse Jr. drove at Daytona, Las Vegas, and Richmond. The No. 8 team also ran at New Hampshire with TBR development driver Ryan Preece behind the wheel. The team had sponsorship from East West Marine for the event.

In 2014, the team switched back to No. 36, with Parrott remaining crew chief. Preece again drove the car at New Hampshire with East-West Marine sponsoring. He was also scheduled to drive at Richmond in September, but this was changed to Homestead to avoid conflicting with Preece's Whelen Modified Series schedule.

==== Car No. 36 results ====
Year	Driver	No.	Make	1	2	3	4	5	6	7	8	9	10	11	12	13	14	15	16	17	18	19	20	21	22	23	24	25	26	27	28	29	30	31	32	33	Owners	Pts
2012	Ryan Truex	36	Chevy	DAY; 31	PHO	LVS	BRI	CAL	TEX																												40th	175
2012	Ryan Blaney	36	Chevy							RCH; 7	TAL	DAR; 43	IOW	CLT	DOV	MCH	ROA	KEN; 15				IND; 27	IOW	GLN	CGV	BRI; 7	ATL	RCH	CHI	KEN	DOV	CLT; 14	KAN	TEX	PHO	HOM	40th	175
2012	Bobby Santos III	36	Chevy																DAY; 33	NHA	CHI																40th	175
2014	Ryan Preece	36	Chevy	DAY	PHO	LVS	BRI	CAL	TEX	DAR	RCH	TAL	IOW	CLT	DOV	MCH	ROA	KEN	DAY	NHA; 14	CHI	IND	IOW	GLN	MOH	BRI	ATL	RCH	CHI	KEN	DOV	KAN	CLT	TEX	PHO	HOM; 28	52nd	46

=== Partnership with Team SLR ===
In 2012, TBR created a partnership with Team SLR and driver/owner Scott Lagasse Jr. Team SLR would field the No. 8 Chevrolet Impala in select races during the 2012 Nationwide Season with sponsorship from the Boy Scouts of America and Hybrid Light. Chassis would be provided by TBR, and engines would be provided by ECR Engines. The team ran 3 races in 2012, with Lagasse driving at Kentucky, Kansas, and Homestead. In 2013, the team was folded into TBR itself.

==== Car No. 8 results ====
Year	Driver	No.	Make	1	2	3	4	5	6	7	8	9	10	11	12	13	14	15	16	17	18	19	20	21	22	23	24	25	26	27	28	29	30	31	32	33	Owners	Pts
2012	Scott Lagasse Jr.	8	Chevy	DAY	PHO	LVS	BRI	CAL	TEX	RCH	TAL	DAR	IOW	CLT	DOV	MCH	ROA	KEN	DAY	NHA	CHI	IND	IOW	GLN	CGV	BRI	ATL	RCH	CHI	KEN; 26	DOV	CLT	KAN; 24	TEX	PHO	HOM; 20	53rd	62
2013	Scott Lagasse Jr.	8	Chevy	DAY; 39	PHO	LVS; 20	BRI	CAL	TEX	RCH; 21	TAL	DAR	CLT	DOV	IOW	MCH	ROA	KEN	DAY																		48th	72
2013	Ryan Preece	8	Chevy																	NHA; 24	CHI	IND	IOW	GLN	MOH	BRI	ATL	RCH	CHI	KEN	DOV	KAN	CLT	TEX	PHO	HOM	48th	72
