= Kelly Bires =

American racing driver (born 1984)

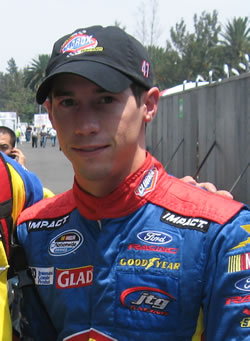
- Bires in 2008
- Born: Kelly James Bires; August 25, 1984 (age 42); Mauston, Wisconsin, U.S.
- Achievements: 2001 Great Lakes Allison Legacy Series Champion; 2006 ASA Late Model Series Challenge Division Champion
- Awards: 2006 ASA Late Model Series Rookie of the Year

NASCAR Cup Series career
- 3 races run over 1 year
- Best finish: 54th (2012)
- First race: 2012 Lenox Industrial Tools 301 (Loudon)
- Last race: 2012 Hollywood Casino 400 (Kansas)
Wins	Top tens	Poles
0	0	0

NASCAR O'Reilly Auto Parts Series career
- 88 races run over 6 years
- Best finish: 13th (2008)
- First race: 2007 Federated Auto Parts 300 (Nashville)
- Last race: 2012 OneMain Financial 200 (Dover)
Wins	Top tens	Poles
0	13	0

NASCAR FedEx Freight Truck Series career
- 8 races run over 2 years
- Best finish: 44th (2007)
- First race: 2006 Easy Care Vehicle Service Contracts 200 (Atlanta)
- Last race: 2007 Toyota Tundra Milwaukee 200 (Milwaukee)
Wins	Top tens	Poles
0	1	0
- Statistics up to date as of October 21, 2012.

Kelly James Bires (born August 25, 1984) is an American former professional stock car racing driver. He most recently drove part-time for Go Green Racing in the NASCAR Sprint Cup Series and Nationwide Series. Previously, Bires drove competitively for JTG Daugherty Racing, JR Motorsports, and Braun Racing in the Nationwide Series.

== Early career ==
Bires began karting at Sugar River Raceway in Brodhead, Wisconsin at the age of nine and began competing in national karting events at the age of twelve. He won several regional titles and two national championships.

Bires became the Great Lakes Allison Legacy Series Rookie of the Year in 2000, and followed up the championship by winning the series in 2001. Bires next moved up to the Super Late Model race cars at Dells Motor Speedway, finishing fifth in points and named 2002 Rookie of the Year. The following year, he finished second in championship points. Bires made his first start in ARCA in May 2004. In 2006, he joined up with veteran American Speed Association Late Model Series crew chief Howie Lettow and won the season championship that year.

== NASCAR career ==
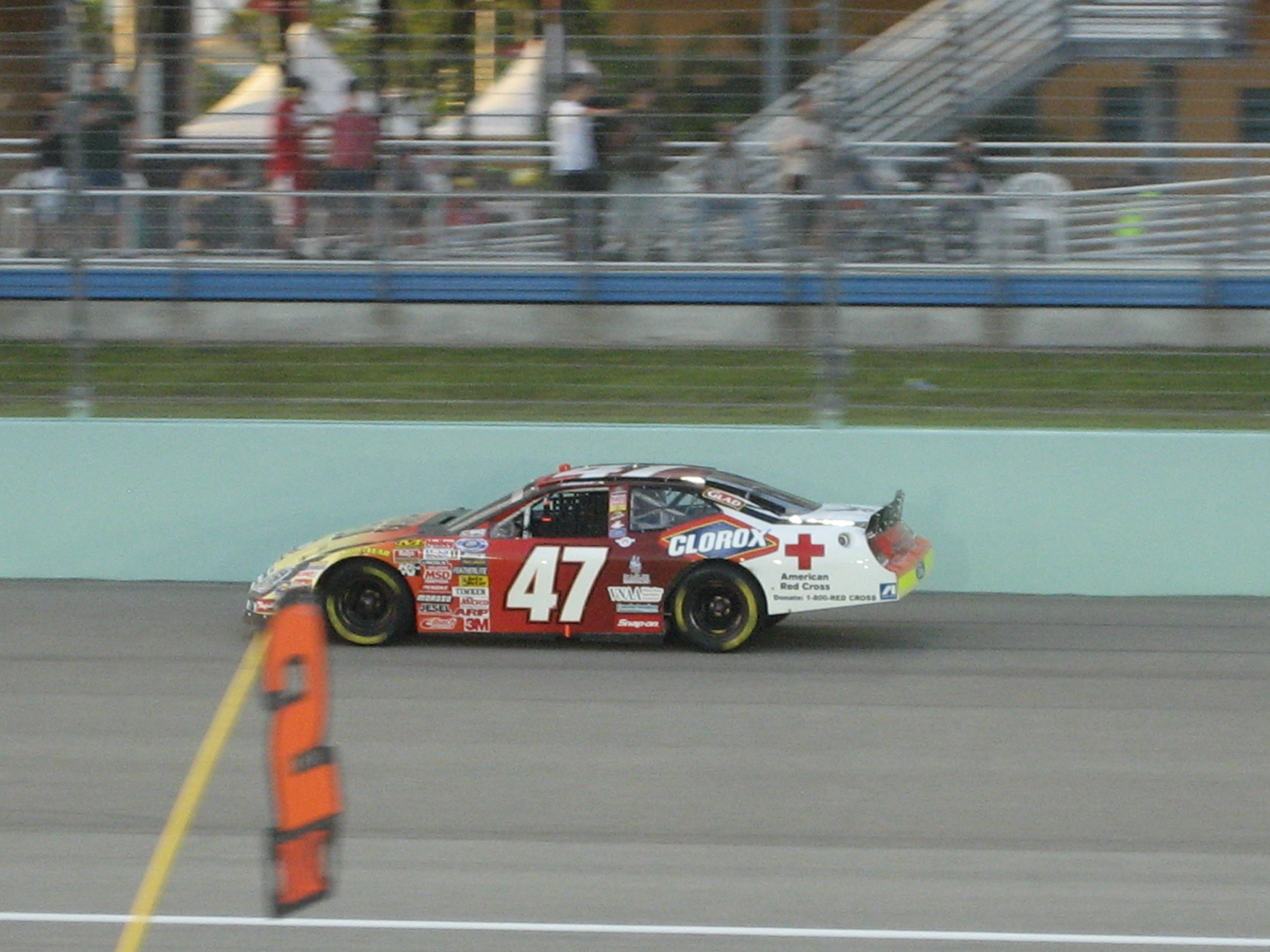
Bires during the 2007 Ford 300

=== 2007–2008 ===
In the 2007 NASCAR Craftsman Truck Series, Bires was the driver of the No. 21 Wood Brothers Racing truck in nineteen races, handing over driving duties for the other six races to veteran Mark Martin. He had a tenth-place finish at Atlanta. After the departure of Jon Wood due to illness, Bires left the Truck Series and started racing for Tad Geschickter beginning at Nashville Superspeedway. His best Busch Series start was 26th and best finish was seventh in the Meijer 300 presented by Oreo race at Kentucky Speedway. Named the permanent driver of the No. 47 car in 2008, Bires had six top-ten finishes en route to a thirteenth-place points finish. But with Clorox/Kingsford moving up with Marcos Ambrose to the Sprint Cup Series, he was left without a full-time ride at the end of the season due to lack of sponsorship.

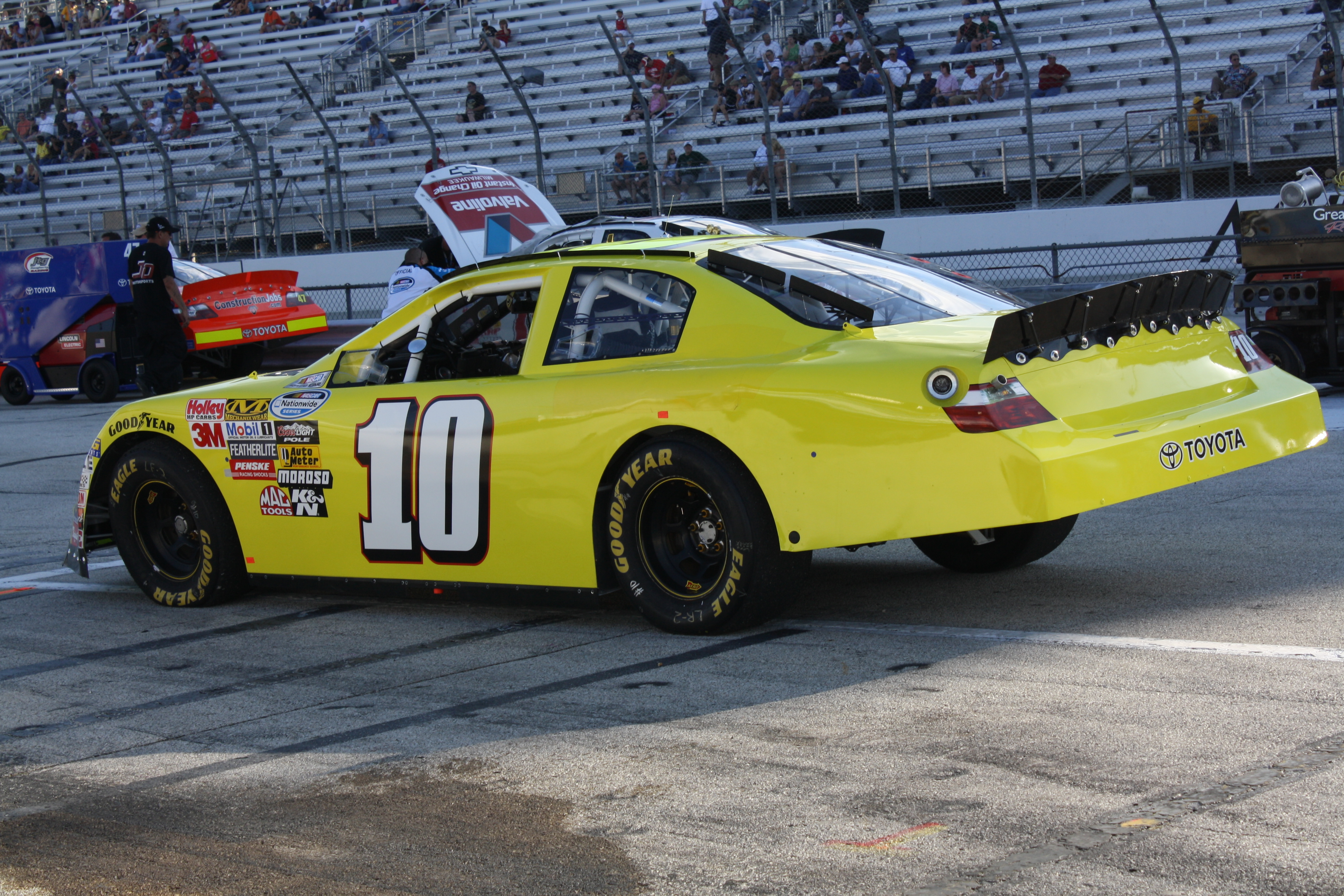
Bires' 2009 Nationwide car

=== 2009 to present ===
Bires spent the 2009 season driving for various teams, including Braun Racing, MSRP Motorsports, and JTG, where he start and parked, as well as competing for Kevin Harvick Incorporated and CJM Racing. His best finish that year came at Iowa Speedway, where he finished fifth in Braun's Fraternal Order of Eagles Toyota. Bires also had a tenth place finish for KHI at Nashville. At the end of the season, Bires signed a two-year contract to drive for JR Motorsports in the No. 88 Chevy through 2011, with Earnhardt eager to see what Bires could do in his equipment. Bires drove the No. 5 Ragu Chevy for Junior at Homestead in preparation for running full-time in 2010.

Due to sponsorship obligations with Unilever and their Hellmann's Mayonnaise brand, Dale Earnhardt Jr. ran the No. 88 car at the 2010 season opener at Daytona and Danica Patrick ran the No. 7 car with her sponsor GoDaddy.com, forcing Bires to sit out. In his debut at Fontana, he did have a seventh place finish. Even more curious than his missing Daytona was when Bires was removed from the No. 88 car in favor of Cup driver Jamie McMurray after only five races run, with only one finish below seventeenth (a crash at Las Vegas). Earnhardt Jr. cited chemistry issues between Bires, JR Motorsports management, and the team including Tony Eury Sr. and Jr., and implied that Bires was taking a seat from "the next Brad [Keselowski], the next Jeff Gordon." Prior to Brad Keselowski, the team had also hastily released Mark McFarland in 2006 after 21 races and Shane Huffman in 2007 after eighteen races. Bires returned to the Braun Racing No. 10 at Richmond, where he finished 11th, then ran races for Baker-Curb Racing, Team Rensi Motorsports, and RAB Racing.

Bires returned to the Nationwide Series in 2011, driving for Rensi. However, Bires had to start and park his No. 25 on numerous occasions, and withdrew from two races. After Rensi cut back its schedule, Bires was hired by Joe Gibbs Racing to drive their No. 18 Toyota at Richmond and Chicagoland. Bires also ran two races as a start and park in Go Green Racing's No. 04 car.

Bires attempted six races in the Sprint Cup Series in 2012 for Go Green, making three races but finishing no better than 38th. Bires was released from both the Cup and Nationwide rides in November.

In 2013, Bires became crew chief for the late model team of Matt Kenseth's son Ross Kenseth.

== Motorsports career results ==
=== NASCAR ===
(key) (Bold – Pole position awarded by qualifying time. Italics – Pole position earned by points standings or practice time. * – Most laps led.)

==== Sprint Cup Series ====
NASCAR Sprint Cup Series results
Year	Team	No.	Make	1	2	3	4	5	6	7	8	9	10	11	12	13	14	15	16	17	18	19	20	21	22	23	24	25	26	27	28	29	30	31	32	33	34	35	36	NSCC	Pts	Ref
2009	BlackJack Racing	51	Dodge	DAY; DNQ	CAL	LVS	ATL	BRI	MAR	TEX	PHO	TAL	RCH	DAR	CLT	DOV	POC	MCH	SON	NHA	DAY	CHI	IND	POC	GLN	MCH	BRI	ATL	RCH	NHA	DOV	KAN	CAL	CLT	MAR	TAL	TEX	PHO	HOM	83rd	0	
2012	Go Green Racing	79	Ford	DAY	PHO	LVS	BRI	CAL	MAR	TEX	KAN	RCH	TAL	DAR	CLT	DOV	POC	MCH	SON	KEN	DAY	NHA; 42	IND	POC	GLN	MCH	BRI; DNQ	ATL	RCH	CHI	NHA; 43	DOV; DNQ	TAL	CLT	KAN; 38	MAR	TEX; DNQ	PHO	HOM	54th	9	

===== Daytona 500 =====
Year	Team	Manufacturer	Start	Finish
2009	BlackJack Racing	Dodge	DNQ	

==== Nationwide Series ====
NASCAR Nationwide Series results
Year	Team	No.	Make	1	2	3	4	5	6	7	8	9	10	11	12	13	14	15	16	17	18	19	20	21	22	23	24	25	26	27	28	29	30	31	32	33	34	35	NNSC	Pts	Ref
2007	JTG Daugherty Racing	47	Ford	DAY	CAL	MXC	LVS	ATL	BRI	NSH	TEX	PHO	TAL	RCH	DAR	CLT	DOV	NSH; 15	KEN; 7	MLW; 30	NHA; 24	DAY; 16	CHI; 24	GTY; 24	IRP; 38	CGV	GLN	MCH; 32	BRI; 29	CAL; 23	RCH; 26	DOV; 19	KAN; 40	CLT; 9	MEM; 14	TEX; 19	PHO; 22	HOM; 20	32nd	1820	
2008	JTG Daugherty Racing	47	Ford	DAY; 12	CAL; 30	LVS; 15	ATL; 12	BRI; 20	NSH; 5	TEX; 17	PHO; 19	MXC; 31	TAL; 36	RCH; 20	DAR; 24	CLT; 33	DOV; 13	NSH; 8	KEN; 19	MLW; 11	NHA; 22	DAY; 16	CHI; 12	GTY; 32	IRP; 36	CGV; 24	GLN; 17	MCH; 9	BRI; 17	CAL; 13	RCH; 20	DOV; 34	KAN; 10	CLT; 7	MEM; 18	TEX; 22	PHO; 17	HOM; 9	13th	3764	
2009	Braun Racing	10	Toyota	DAY	CAL	LVS; 37	BRI; 42	TEX										MLW; 36						IOW; 5	GLN	MCH	BRI	CGV											48th	1053	
2009	Kevin Harvick Incorporated	33	Chevy						NSH; 4	PHO	TAL	RCH	DAR	CLT	DOV		KEN; 10																		MEM; 25	TEX	PHO		48th	1053	
2009	MSRP Motorsports	91	Chevy													NSH; 37			NHA; 41	DAY																			48th	1053	
2009	JTG Daugherty Racing	47	Toyota																		CHI; 40	GTY; 40	IRP; 39																48th	1053	
2009	CJM Racing	11	Toyota																										ATL; 32	RCH	DOV	KAN	CAL	CLT					48th	1053	
2009	JR Motorsports	5	Chevy																																			HOM; 29	48th	1053	
2010	JR Motorsports	88	Chevy	DAY	CAL; 7	LVS; 42	BRI; 12	NSH; 14	PHO; 17	TEX	TAL																												45th	1019	
2010	Braun Racing	10	Toyota									RCH; 11	DAR	DOV	CLT	NSH	KEN	ROA	NHA	DAY	CHI																		45th	1019	
2010	Baker Curb Racing	27	Ford																			GTY; 32	IRP	IOW	GLN	MCH	BRI	CGV	ATL										45th	1019	
2010	Team Rensi Motorsports	25	Ford																											RCH; 27				CLT; 22	GTY	TEX	PHO	HOM	45th	1019	
2010	RAB Racing	09	Ford																												DOV; 21	KAN	CAL						45th	1019	
2011	Team Rensi Motorsports	25	Ford	DAY; 43	PHO; 37	LVS; 35	BRI; 43	CAL	TEX	TAL	NSH																												47th	77	
2011	Joe Gibbs Racing	18	Toyota									RCH; 30	DAR	DOV	IOW		CHI; 8	MCH	ROA	DAY	KEN	NHA	NSH	IRP	IOW	GLN	CGV	BRI	ATL	RCH	CHI								47th	77	
2011	Go Green Racing	04	Ford													CLT; 42																DOV; 37	KAN	CLT	TEX	PHO	HOM		47th	77	
2012	Go Green Racing	39	Ford	DAY	PHO	LVS	BRI	CAL	TEX; 22	RCH	TAL	DAR	IOW	CLT	DOV	MCH	ROA	KEN	DAY	NHA	CHI	IND	IOW	GLN	CGV	BRI	ATL	RCH	CHI	KEN									131st	0^{1}	
2012	Rick Ware Racing	15	Chevy																												DOV; 42	CLT	KAN	TEX	PHO	HOM			131st	0^{1}	

^{*} Season still in progress
^{1} Ineligible for series points

==== Craftsman Truck Series ====
NASCAR Craftsman Truck Series results
Year	Team	No.	Make	1	2	3	4	5	6	7	8	9	10	11	12	13	14	15	16	17	18	19	20	21	22	23	24	25	NCTC	Pts	Ref
2006	Wood Brothers/JTG Racing	19	Ford	DAY	CAL	ATL	MAR	GTY	CLT	MFD	DOV	TEX	MCH	MLW	KAN	KEN	MEM	IRP	NSH	BRI	NHA	LVS	TAL	MAR	ATL; 19	TEX	PHO	HOM	76th	106	
2007	Wood Brothers Racing	21	Ford	DAY; 26		ATL; 10	MAR; 34	KAN; 31	CLT	MFD; 25	DOV	TEX	MCH	MLW; 35	MEM	KEN	IRP	NSH	BRI	GTW	NHA	LVS	TAL	MAR	ATL	TEX	PHO	HOM	44th	572	
2007	Xpress Motorsports	16	Ford		CAL; 29																								44th	572	
