= 2012 AAA Texas 500 =

Race details
- Race 34 of 36 in the 2012 NASCAR Sprint Cup Series
- The 2012 AAA Texas 500 program cover, featuring Dale Earnhardt Jr., Tony Stewart, and Danica Patrick. "Come One, Come Y'all! The Greatest Show on Asphalt"
- Date: November 4, 2012
- Location: Texas Motor Speedway in Fort Worth, Texas
- Course: Permanent racing facility
- Course length: 1.5 miles (2.4 km)
- Distance: 335 laps, 502.5 mi (808.695 km)
- Weather: Scattered showers with a temperature around 71 °F (22 °C); wind out of the NWN at 9 miles per hour (14 km/h).
- Average speed: 136.117 miles per hour (219.059 km/h)

Pole position
Driver	Jimmie Johnson	Hendrick Motorsports
- Time: 28.261

Most laps led
Driver	Jimmie Johnson	Hendrick Motorsports
- Laps: 168

Winner
No. 48	Jimmie Johnson	Hendrick Motorsports

Television in the United States
- Network: ESPN
- Announcers: Allen Bestwick, Dale Jarrett and Andy Petree

The 2012 AAA Texas 500 was a NASCAR Sprint Cup Series race held on November 4, 2012, at Texas Motor Speedway in Fort Worth, Texas. Contested over 334 laps on the 1.5-mile (2.4 km) asphalt quad-oval, it was the 34th race of the 2012 Sprint Cup Series season, as well as the 8th race in the ten-race Chase for the Sprint Cup, which ends the season. Jimmie Johnson of Hendrick Motorsports won the race, his 5th win of the season. Brad Keselowski finished second, and Kyle Busch third.

== Report ==
=== Background ===
Texas Motor Speedway, the race track where the race was held.

Texas Motor Speedway is one of ten intermediate tracks to hold NASCAR races. The standard track at Texas Motor Speedway is a four-turn quad-oval track that is 1.5 miles (2.4 km) long. The track's turns are banked at 24 degrees, while the front stretch, the location of the finish line, is five degrees. The back stretch, opposite of the front, also has a five degree banking. The racetrack has seats for 191,122 spectators.

Before the race, Jimmie Johnson led the Drivers' Championship with 2,291 points, and Brad Keselowski stood in 2nd with 2,289 points. Clint Bowyer followed in 3rd with 2,265 points, three points ahead of Kasey Kahne and 23 ahead of Denny Hamlin in 4th and 5th. Jeff Gordon with 2,237 was nine points ahead of Martin Truex Jr., as Matt Kenseth with 2,226 points, was four points ahead of Greg Biffle and six ahead of Tony Stewart. Kevin Harvick and Dale Earnhardt Jr. was 11th and 12th with 2,203 and 2,151 points, respectively.

In the Manufacturers' Championship, Chevrolet was leading with 222 points, 25 points ahead of Toyota. Ford, with 164 points, was 21 points ahead of Dodge in the battle for 3rd. Stewart is the defending race winner after winning the event in 2011.

==== Entry list ====
No.	Driver	Team	Make
1	Jamie McMurray	Earnhardt Ganassi Racing	Chevrolet
2	Brad Keselowski	Penske Racing	Dodge
5	Kasey Kahne	Hendrick Motorsports	Chevrolet
9	Marcos Ambrose	Richard Petty Motorsports	Ford
10	Danica Patrick	Tommy Baldwin Racing	Chevrolet
11	Denny Hamlin	Joe Gibbs Racing	Toyota
13	Casey Mears	Germain Racing	Ford
14	Tony Stewart	Stewart–Haas Racing	Chevrolet
15	Clint Bowyer	Michael Waltrip Racing	Toyota
16	Greg Biffle	Roush Fenway Racing	Ford
17	Matt Kenseth	Roush Fenway Racing	Ford
18	Kyle Busch	Joe Gibbs Racing	Toyota
19	Mike Bliss	Humphrey Smith Racing	Toyota
20	Joey Logano	Joe Gibbs Racing	Toyota
21	Trevor Bayne	Wood Brothers Racing	Ford
22	Sam Hornish Jr.	Penske Racing	Dodge
24	Jeff Gordon	Hendrick Motorsports	Chevrolet
26	Josh Wise	Front Row Motorsports	Ford
27	Paul Menard	Richard Childress Racing	Chevrolet
29	Kevin Harvick	Richard Childress Racing	Chevrolet
30	David Stremme	Inception Motorsports	Toyota
31	Jeff Burton	Richard Childress Racing	Chevrolet
32	Ken Schrader	FAS Lane Racing	Ford
33	Stephen Leicht	Circle Sport Racing	Chevrolet
34	David Ragan	Front Row Motorsports	Ford
36	Dave Blaney	Tommy Baldwin Racing	Chevrolet
37	J. J. Yeley	Max Q Motorsports	Chevrolet
38	David Gilliland	Front Row Motorsports	Ford
39	Ryan Newman	Stewart–Haas Racing	Chevrolet
42	Juan Pablo Montoya	Earnhardt Ganassi Racing	Chevrolet
43	Aric Almirola	Richard Petty Motorsports	Ford
47	Bobby Labonte	JTG Daugherty Racing	Toyota
48	Jimmie Johnson	Hendrick Motorsports	Chevrolet
51	A. J. Allmendinger	Phoenix Racing	Chevrolet
55	Mark Martin	Michael Waltrip Racing	Toyota
56	Martin Truex Jr.	Michael Waltrip Racing	Toyota
78	Kurt Busch	Furniture Row Racing	Chevrolet
79	Kelly Bires	Go Green Racing	Ford
83	Landon Cassill	BK Racing	Toyota
87	Joe Nemechek	NEMCO Motorsports	Toyota
88	Dale Earnhardt Jr.	Hendrick Motorsports	Chevrolet
91	Reed Sorenson	Humphrey Smith Racing	Toyota
93	Travis Kvapil	BK Racing	Toyota
95	Scott Speed	Leavine Family Racing	Ford
98	Michael McDowell	Phil Parsons Racing	Ford
99	Carl Edwards	Roush Fenway Racing	Ford

=== Practice and qualifying ===
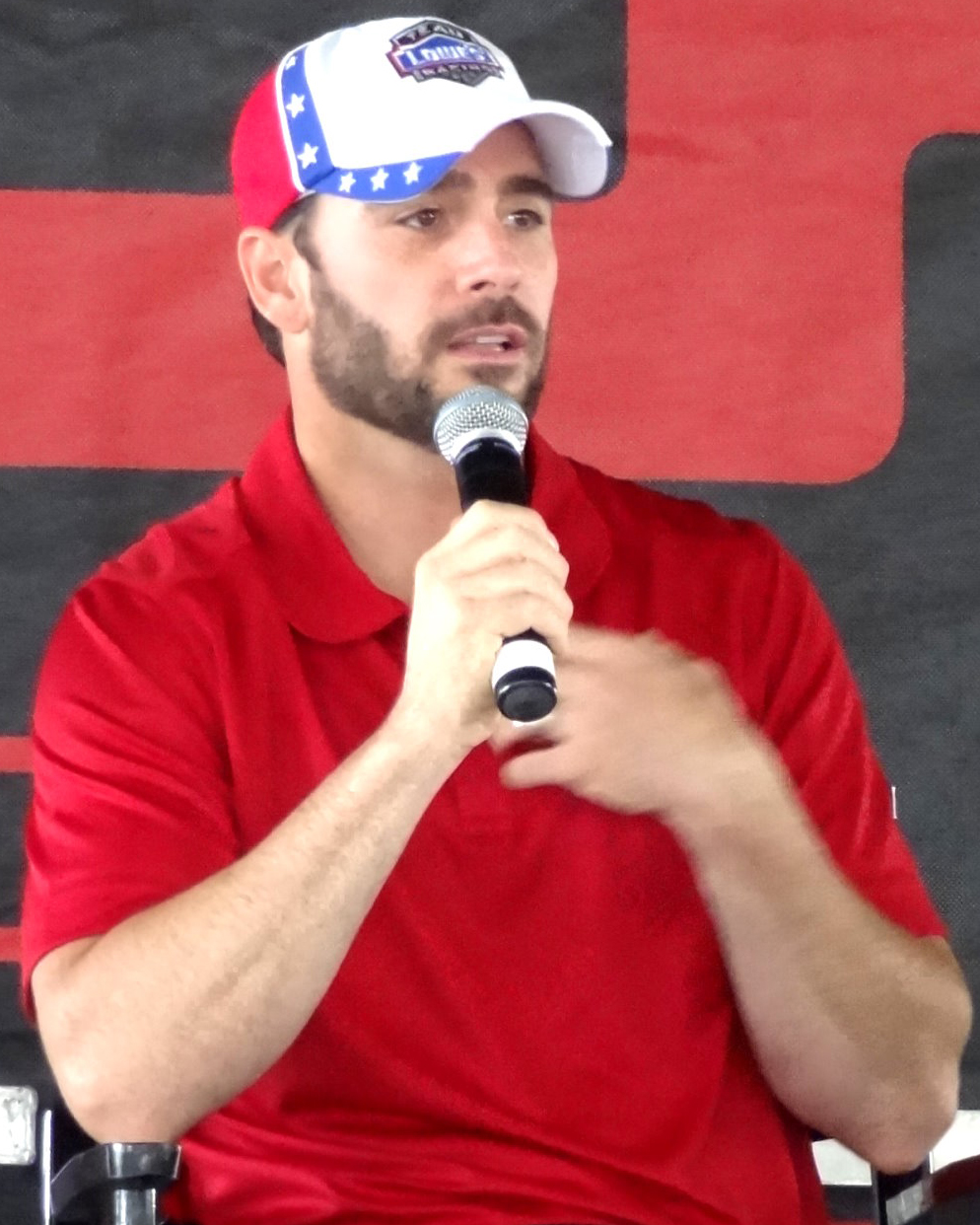
Jimmie Johnson won the pole position, his fourth of the 2012 season.

Three practice sessions are scheduled to be held before the race; the first on Friday, which lasted 90 minutes. The second and third are both scheduled on Saturday afternoon with the first being 50 minutes long, while the second is scheduled for 60. Truex Jr. was quickest with a time of 28.310 seconds in the first session, 0.044 seconds faster than Mark Martin. Keselowski was just off Martin's pace, followed by Bowyer, Stewart, and Aric Almirola. Kenseth was 7th, still within a half of a second of Truex's time.

46 cars were entered for qualifying, but only 43 could qualify for the race because of NASCAR's qualifying procedure. Johnson clinched the 29th pole position of his career and 4th of the season, with a time of 28.261 seconds. He was joined on the front row of the grid by Biffle. Kyle Busch qualified third, Bowyer took 4th, and Truex Jr. started 5th. Joey Logano, Trevor Bayne, Keselowski, Carl Edwards and Kenseth rounded out the top ten The three drivers that failed to qualify for the race were Stephen Leicht, Kelly Bires, and David Stremme.

In the second practice session, Keselowski was fastest with a time of 28.888 seconds, 100th of a second quicker than second-placed Johnson. Hamlin took third place, ahead of Biffle, Edwards and Bowyer. Kyle Busch only managed 7th place, while Stewart was only quick enough for 8th position. In the third and final practice, Keselowski remained quickest with a time of 29.300 seconds. Bowyer followed in second, ahead of Kenseth and Johnson. Edwards was 5th quickest, with a time of 29.375 seconds. Hamlin, Sam Hornish Jr., Kyle Busch, A. J. Allmendinger, and Earnhardt Jr. rounded out the first ten positions.

== Results ==
=== Qualifying ===
Grid	No.	Driver	Team	Manufacturer	Time	Speed
1	48	Jimmie Johnson	Hendrick Motorsports	Chevrolet	28.261	191.076
2	16	Greg Biffle	Roush Fenway Racing	Ford	28.364	190.382
3	18	Kyle Busch	Joe Gibbs Racing	Toyota	28.402	190.128
4	15	Clint Bowyer	Michael Waltrip Racing	Toyota	28.411	190.067
5	56	Martin Truex Jr.	Michael Waltrip Racing	Toyota	28.422	189.994
6	20	Joey Logano	Joe Gibbs Racing	Toyota	28.457	189.760
7	21	Trevor Bayne	Wood Brothers Racing	Ford	28.480	189.607
8	2	Brad Keselowski	Penske Racing	Dodge	28.491	189.533
9	99	Carl Edwards	Roush Fenway Racing	Ford	28.500	189.474
10	17	Matt Kenseth	Roush Fenway Racing	Ford	28.502	189.460
11	55	Mark Martin	Michael Waltrip Racing	Toyota	28.527	189.294
12	11	Denny Hamlin	Joe Gibbs Racing	Toyota	28.530	189.274
13	5	Kasey Kahne	Hendrick Motorsports	Chevrolet	28.573	188.990
14	43	Aric Almirola	Richard Petty Motorsports	Ford	28.575	188.976
15	9	Marcos Ambrose	Richard Petty Motorsports	Ford	28.583	188.923
16	24	Jeff Gordon	Hendrick Motorsports	Chevrolet	28.602	188.798
17	22	Sam Hornish Jr.	Penske Racing	Dodge	28.628	188.626
18	78	Kurt Busch	Furniture Row Racing	Chevrolet	28.663	188.396
19	88	Dale Earnhardt Jr.	Hendrick Motorsports	Chevrolet	28.669	188.357
20	13	Casey Mears	Germain Racing	Ford	28.672	188.337
21	14	Tony Stewart	Stewart–Haas Racing	Chevrolet	28.717	188.042
22	31	Jeff Burton	Richard Childress Racing	Chevrolet	28.724	187.996
23	29	Kevin Harvick	Richard Childress Racing	Chevrolet	28.757	187.780
24	1	Jamie McMurray	Earnhardt Ganassi Racing	Chevrolet	28.790	187.565
25	42	Juan Pablo Montoya	Earnhardt Ganassi Racing	Chevrolet	28.810	187.435
26	51	A. J. Allmendinger	Phoenix Racing	Chevrolet	28.817	187.389
27	27	Paul Menard	Richard Childress Racing	Chevrolet	28.823	187.350
28	37	J. J. Yeley	Max Q Motorsports	Chevrolet	28.836	187.266
29	47	Bobby Labonte	JTG Daugherty Racing	Toyota	28.842	187.227
30	38	David Gilliland	Front Row Motorsports	Ford	28.899	186.858
31	95	Scott Speed	Leavine Family Racing	Ford	28.899	186.858
32	10	Danica Patrick	Tommy Baldwin Racing	Chevrolet	28.948	186.541
33	34	David Ragan	Front Row Motorsports	Ford	28.958	186.477
34	19	Mike Bliss	Humphrey Smith Racing	Toyota	28.959	186.471
35	26	Josh Wise	Front Row Motorsports	Ford	28.968	186.413
36	39	Ryan Newman	Stewart–Haas Racing	Chevrolet	28.975	186.368
37	98	Michael McDowell	Phil Parsons Racing	Ford	29.022	186.066
38	93	Travis Kvapil	BK Racing	Toyota	29.053	185.867
39	91	Reed Sorenson	Humphrey Smith Racing	Toyota	29.077	185.714
40	36	Dave Blaney	Tommy Baldwin Racing	Chevrolet	29.204	184.906
41	83	Landon Cassill	BK Racing	Toyota	29.287	184.382
42	32	Ken Schrader	FAS Lane Racing	Ford	29.696	181.843
43	87	Joe Nemechek	NEMCO Motorsports	Toyota	29.097	185.586
Failed to Qualify
	33	Stephen Leicht	Circle Sport Racing	Chevrolet	29.173	185.103
	79	Kelly Bires	Go Green Racing	Ford	29.494	183.088
	30	David Stremme	Inception Motorsports	Toyota	30.568	176.655

=== Race results ===
Pos	Grid	Car	Driver	Team	Manufacturer	Laps	Points
1	1	48	Jimmie Johnson	Hendrick Motorsports	Chevrolet	335	48
2	8	2	Brad Keselowski	Penske Racing	Dodge	335	43
3	3	18	Kyle Busch	Joe Gibbs Racing	Toyota	335	42
4	10	17	Matt Kenseth	Roush Fenway Racing	Ford	335	41
5	21	14	Tony Stewart	Stewart–Haas Racing	Chevrolet	335	39
6	4	15	Clint Bowyer	Michael Waltrip Racing	Toyota	335	38
7	19	88	Dale Earnhardt Jr.	Hendrick Motorsports	Chevrolet	335	37
8	18	78	Kurt Busch	Furniture Row Racing	Chevrolet	335	36
9	23	29	Kevin Harvick	Richard Childress Racing	Chevrolet	335	35
10	2	16	Greg Biffle	Roush Fenway Racing	Ford	335	34
11	6	20	Joey Logano	Joe Gibbs Racing	Toyota	335	33
12	36	39	Ryan Newman	Stewart–Haas Racing	Chevrolet	335	33
13	5	56	Martin Truex Jr.	Michael Waltrip Racing	Toyota	335	31
14	16	24	Jeff Gordon	Hendrick Motorsports	Chevrolet	335	30
15	14	43	Aric Almirola	Richard Petty Motorsports	Ford	335	29
16	9	99	Carl Edwards	Roush Fenway Racing	Ford	335	28
17	17	22	Sam Hornish Jr.	Penske Racing	Dodge	335	0
18	24	1	Jamie McMurray	Earnhardt Ganassi Racing	Chevrolet	335	26
19	22	31	Jeff Burton	Richard Childress Racing	Chevrolet	335	25
20	12	11	Denny Hamlin	Joe Gibbs Racing	Toyota	335	24
21	20	13	Casey Mears	Germain Racing	Ford	335	23
22	7	21	Trevor Bayne	Wood Brothers Racing	Ford	335	0
23	38	93	Travis Kvapil	BK Racing	Toyota	335	22
24	32	10	Danica Patrick	Tommy Baldwin Racing	Chevrolet	335	0
25	13	5	Kasey Kahne	Hendrick Motorsports	Chevrolet	334	19
26	41	83	Landon Cassill	BK Racing	Toyota	333	18
27	27	27	Paul Menard	Richard Childress Racing	Chevrolet	332	17
28	33	34	David Ragan	Front Row Motorsports	Ford	331	16
29	11	55	Mark Martin	Michael Waltrip Racing	Toyota	329	15
30	31	95	Scott Speed	Leavine Family Racing	Ford	328	14
31	42	32	Ken Schrader	FAS Lane Racing	Ford	328	13
32	15	9	Marcos Ambrose	Richard Petty Motorsports	Ford	310	12
33	29	47	Bobby Labonte	JTG Daugherty Racing	Toyota	284	11
34	25	42	Juan Pablo Montoya	Earnhardt Ganassi Racing	Chevrolet	279	10
35	30	38	David Gilliland	Front Row Motorsports	Ford	225	9
36	36	51	A. J. Allmendinger	Phoenix Racing	Chevrolet	107	8
37	35	26	Josh Wise	Front Row Motorsports	Ford	41	7
38	37	98	Michael McDowell	Phil Parsons Racing	Ford	37	6
39	40	36	Dave Blaney	Tommy Baldwin Racing	Chevrolet	37	5
40	43	87	Joe Nemechek	NEMCO Motorsports	Toyota	33	0
41	34	19	Mike Bliss	Humphrey Smith Racing	Toyota	32	0
42	28	37	J. J. Yeley	Max Q Motorsports	Chevrolet	10	2
43	39	91	Reed Sorenson	Humphrey Smith Racing	Toyota	6	0

== Standings after the race ==
Drivers' Championship standings

	Pos	Driver	Points
	1	Jimmie Johnson	2,339
	2	Brad Keselowski	2,332 (–7)
	3	Clint Bowyer	2,303 (–36)
	4	Kasey Kahne	2,281 (–58)
3	5	Matt Kenseth	2,267 (–72)

Manufacturers' Championship standings

Pos	Manufacturer	Points
1	Chevrolet	231
2	Toyota	201 (–30)
3	Ford	167 (–64)
4	Dodge	149 (–82)

- Note: Only the first twelve positions are included for the driver standings.

Previous race: 2012 Tums Fast Relief 500	Sprint Cup Series; 2012 season	Next race: 2012 AdvoCare 500
