= 2009 Daytona 500 =

Race details
- Race 1 of 36 in the 2009 NASCAR Sprint Cup Series
- Date: February 15, 2009
- Location: Daytona International Speedway; Daytona Beach, Florida, U.S.
- Course: Permanent racing facility 2.5 mi (4.023 km)
- Distance: 152 laps, 380 mi (610 km)
- Scheduled distance: 200 laps, 500 mi (804.672 km)
- Weather: Temperatures reaching up to 73.9 °F (23.3 °C); wind speeds up to 8.9 miles per hour (14.3 km/h)
- Average speed: 132.816 miles per hour (213.747 km/h)

Pole position
Driver	Martin Truex Jr.	Earnhardt Ganassi Racing

Qualifying race winners
Duel 1 Winner	Jeff Gordon	Hendrick Motorsports
Duel 2 Winner	Kyle Busch	Joe Gibbs Racing

Most laps led
Driver	Kyle Busch	Joe Gibbs Racing
- Laps: 88

Winner
No. 17	Matt Kenseth	Roush Fenway Racing

Television in the United States
- Network: Fox
- Announcers: Mike Joy, Darrell Waltrip, and Larry McReynolds
- Nielsen ratings: 9.2/19 (15.954 million viewers)

The 2009 Daytona 500, the 51st running of the event, was held on February 15, 2009, at Daytona International Speedway in Daytona Beach, Florida as the first points-paying race of the 2009 NASCAR Sprint Cup season and the last 500 of the 2000s decade. The race was won by Matt Kenseth, making a car numbered 17 winning the race for the first time in 20 years since Darrell Waltrip's win back in 1989 and the first Daytona 500 win for Roush Fenway Racing. The race was called off with 48 laps to go after a severe rainstorm that had been lingering throughout the area hit the track.

The program for the 2009 Daytona 500.

This marks the first Daytona 500 without The Petty family and the first without Dale Jarrett since 1990.

== Defending champions ==
For the first time since 1981, the defending race champion driver and the team have been split. Ryan Newman, the champion driver, drove for Stewart–Haas Racing in the No. 39 Chevrolet Impala. The team that he won with, Penske Racing, fielded the No. 12 Dodge Charger with David Stremme behind the wheel.

The last time a driver and team split was when Buddy Baker drove for Harry Ranier Racing in winning the 1980 event, but the next year was the driver of Hoss Ellington's No. 1.

Former winners Kevin Harvick (2007), Michael Waltrip (2001, 2003), Jeff Gordon (1997, 1999, 2005), Bill Elliott (1985, 1987), Dale Earnhardt Jr. (2004), Jimmie Johnson (2006), and Ryan Newman (2008) did race in the event finishing second, seventh, thirteenth, twenty-third, twenty-seventh, thirty-first, and thirty-sixth respectively. Derrike Cope (1990) and Geoff Bodine (1986), also former winners, failed to qualify.

== Entry list ==
- (W) denotes past 500 winner
- (R) denotes rookie driver

No.	Driver	Team	Manufacturer
00	David Reutimann	Michael Waltrip Racing	Toyota
1	Martin Truex Jr.	Earnhardt Ganassi Racing	Chevrolet
2	Kurt Busch	Penske Championship Racing	Dodge
5	Mark Martin	Hendrick Motorsports	Chevrolet
6	David Ragan	Roush Fenway Racing	Ford
07	Casey Mears	Richard Childress Racing	Chevrolet
7	Robby Gordon	Robby Gordon Motorsports	Toyota
08	Boris Said	Carter/Simo Racing	Ford
8	Aric Almirola	Earnhardt Ganassi Racing	Chevrolet
09	Brad Keselowski	Phoenix Racing	Chevrolet
9	Kasey Kahne	Richard Petty Motorsports	Dodge
11	Denny Hamlin	Joe Gibbs Racing	Toyota
12	David Stremme	Penske Championship Racing	Dodge
14	Tony Stewart	Stewart–Haas Racing	Chevrolet
16	Greg Biffle	Roush Fenway Racing	Ford
17	Matt Kenseth	Roush Fenway Racing	Ford
18	Kyle Busch	Joe Gibbs Racing	Toyota
19	Elliott Sadler	Richard Petty Motorsports	Ford
20	Joey Logano (R)	Joe Gibbs Racing	Toyota
21	Bill Elliott (W)	Wood Brothers Racing	Ford
23	Mike Skinner	R3 Motorsports	Chevrolet
24	Jeff Gordon (W)	Hendrick Motorsports	Chevrolet
26	Jamie McMurray	Roush Fenway Racing	Ford
27	Kirk Shelmerdine	Kirk Shelmerdine Racing	Toyota
28	Travis Kvapil	Yates Racing	Ford
29	Kevin Harvick (W)	Richard Childress Racing	Chevrolet
31	Jeff Burton	Richard Childress Racing	Chevrolet
33	Clint Bowyer	Richard Childress Racing	Chevrolet
34	John Andretti	Front Row Motorsports	Chevrolet
36	Scott Riggs	Tommy Baldwin Racing	Toyota
37	Tony Raines	Front Row Motorsports	Dodge
39	Ryan Newman (W)	Stewart–Haas Racing	Chevrolet
41	Jeremy Mayfield	Mayfield Motorsports	Toyota
42	Juan Pablo Montoya	Earnhardt Ganassi Racing	Chevrolet
43	Reed Sorenson	Richard Petty Motorsports	Dodge
44	A. J. Allmendinger	Richard Petty Motorsports	Dodge
46	Carl Long	Carl Long Racing	Dodge
47	Marcos Ambrose (R)	JTG Daugherty Racing	Toyota
48	Jimmie Johnson (W)	Hendrick Motorsports	Chevrolet
51	Kelly Bires (R)	BlackJack Racing	Dodge
55	Michael Waltrip (W)	Michael Waltrip Racing	Toyota
57	Norm Benning	Norm Benning Racing	Chevrolet
60	James Hylton	E&M Motorsports	Dodge
64	Geoff Bodine (W)	Gunselman Motorsports	Toyota
66	Terry Labonte	Prism Motorsports	Toyota
71	Mike Wallace	TRG Motorsports	Chevrolet
73	Mike Garvey	H&S Motorsports	Dodge
75	Derrike Cope (W)	Cope/Keller Racing	Dodge
77	Sam Hornish Jr.	Penske Championship Racing	Dodge
78	Regan Smith	Furniture Row Racing	Chevrolet
82	Scott Speed (R)	Red Bull Racing Team	Toyota
83	Brian Vickers	Red Bull Racing Team	Toyota
87	Joe Nemechek	NEMCO Motorsports	Toyota
88	Dale Earnhardt Jr. (W)	Hendrick Motorsports	Chevrolet
96	Bobby Labonte	Hall of Fame Racing	Ford
98	Paul Menard	Yates Racing	Ford
99	Carl Edwards	Roush Fenway Racing	Ford
Official Entry list

== Qualifying ==
The Daytona 500 is the only event with a unique qualifying system on the NASCAR circuit. In the primary qualifying, only the front row (the pole position and the second-fastest driver) are locked into the race positions. Since 2005, NASCAR's top 35 owners points standings from the previous season automatically qualify those teams (not the drivers) into the event. The top two teams that are not within the owners' Top 35 automatically qualify in the Gatorade Duels, a pair of 150 miles (240 km) races. This is followed by a combination of last years' owners' points, pole qualifying speed and if needed, a past champions' provisional fills out the field.

Qualifying• One round of NASCAR Sprint Cup Series timed qualifying will be held. Each team may run two laps with the fast lap setting the qualifying time. The two fastest qualifiers set starting positions one and two and are the only guaranteed positions, filling the front row for the Daytona 500. • The Gatorade Duels, the 150-mile qualifying races, will determine starting positions for the Daytona 500 beyond the front row. In the event of cancellation, the field will be set according to the NASCAR Sprint Cup Series Rule Book.

Gatorade Duel Assignment • The eligible highest ranked 35 in 2008 car owner points will be assigned to Gatorade Duel races based on their standing in the 2008 final car owner points. Odd-numbered owner points will compete in the first Gatorade Duel; even-numbered owners will compete in the second. The only exception is that the fastest qualifier will start on the pole in the first Gatorade Duel and the second-fastest will start on the pole in the second, regardless of 2008 car owner point standings. • Owners who failed to finish in the top 35 of the 2008 car owner points will be assigned to a Gatorade Duel based on qualifying times – the highest qualifying owner to the first Duel; the next to the second and alternating through the remaining entries. Starting positions for the Gatorade Duels are based on qualifying times.

Daytona 500 Lineup • Finishing positions in the Gatorade Duels will determine starting positions in the Daytona 500 once the two fastest qualifiers will start on the front row of the Daytona 500 based on their qualifying times, regardless of their finish in the Duels. Based on their finish in the first Duel, the eligible highest ranked 35 in car owner points plus the two highest finishing non-top 35 teams will be lined up in the odd-number starting positions. Based on their finish in the second Duel, the eligible highest ranked 35 in car owner points plus the two highest finishing non-top 35 teams will be lined up in the even-number starting positions. • The remaining positions will be filled based on qualifying times beginning with the next available position. • The composition of the front row will reduce the above numbers. If there are top-35 teams on the front row, the number of guaranteed starters is reduced accordingly. If there are no top-35 teams on the front row, the number of cars that get in based on time is reduced accordingly. • The 43rd starting position will be assigned to any car owner who has the most recent eligible past NASCAR Sprint Cup champion as long as the past champion competed in the 2008 NASCAR Sprint Cup season. If the 43rd position is not used by a past champion, it will be assigned to the next highest qualifying time.

Recap The bottom line – for the 2009 Daytona 500 – is that the top-two qualifiers are in. The remaining top-35 guaranteed starters are in. Four drivers will make the field based on their performance in the duels and the remaining positions will be filled based on qualifying times or being a past champion.

== Race summary ==
=== Pre-Race ===
Country singer Keith Urban performed a concert on the infield singing "Days Go By", "Sweet Thing", and "Better Life". Urban tossed his guitar pick into the crowd at the end of his performance. The first episode of the miniseries "The Adventures of Digger and Friends" premiered during the FOX pre-race coverage; Keith Urban's "Little Digger," the theme song to "The Adventures of Digger and Friends," also premiered. However, from there on, Digger would draw much opposition, including sites, forums, and blogs warning FOX about his use.

The Grand Marshal was the Florida Governor Charlie Crist. RCA Records recording artist Gavin DeGraw sang the USA National Anthem, and actor Tom Cruise drove the 2010 Chevrolet Camaro pace car to the start of the race.

=== Race ===
During the drivers' meeting, NASCAR announced there would be a competition caution on lap 25 because of overnight rain. Despite threatening weather, the race started at 3:30 pm, with the green flag at 3:41 pm, waved by three-time champion Bobby Allison as the "Martin and Martin" front row led the field to the start of the race. Martin Truex Jr. led the first lap and Mark Martin led the next one before being passed by Kyle Busch. The first caution came out on lap 9 when Aric Almirola got tapped from behind by David Ragan and spun near the entrance to pit road, nearly collecting Travis Kvapil. The race restarted on lap 11, with Busch still leading; Busch would remain there until lap 53 when Dale Earnhardt Jr. passed him for the lead. With the help of his Busch (his former teammate), Tony Stewart passed Earnhardt Jr. for the lead while entering turn 4. Shortly after, Travis Kvapil smacked the wall twice on lap 55, bringing out the third caution. Earnhardt Jr. missed his pit stall and lost a lap because he was forced to pit again. Tony Stewart came out of the pits with the lead, until being passed by Jeff Gordon on lap 70. On lap 72, Ryan Newman was in the pits changing tires under green flag conditions when somehow the car fell off the jack while changing the left-side tires. Newman's crew had to use two jacks to lift the car off the ground and complete the pit stop. On lap 80, Daytona 500 rookie Joey Logano avoided Scott Speed losing control out of turn 4 but made contact with the front of Greg Biffle's car, causing him to crash head-on into the inside retaining wall on the front stretch, ending his day. Busch won the race off pit road edging ahead of his teammate Denny Hamlin by over half a car length, while Hermie Sadler reported bad weather about 40 minutes away from the track.

Green flag pit stops began on lap 113 when Gordon over tire wear concerns, and his crew changed tires on lap 113, with the rest of the field on lap 119. David Stremme blew a tire on pit road as soon as his teammates Reed Sorenson and Elliott Sadler exited. Sadler wound up in 2nd and Sorenson in 3rd while the entire field had to pit one lap later. Earnhardt Jr. mistakenly made his second pit stop in Lap 121 by completing his pit stop with his right front tire over the outside boundary line of his pit box, resulting in a one-lap penalty.

On lap 124, the race for the beneficiary resulted in the "Big One". This began when Earnhardt Jr. spun Brian Vickers into traffic toward the end of the backstretch, collecting race dominator Busch and his brother Kurt, Robby Gordon, Jamie McMurray, Carl Edwards, Denny Hamlin, Scott Speed, and Earnhardt Jr.'s teammate Jimmie Johnson. R. Gordon's car slid in front of Earnhardt Jr. within a couple of feet of contact. Many of Earnhardt Jr.'s fans, the Daytona 500 participants, and the drivers believed that the contact was done intentionally; and many fans (including those of the No. 88 fans) and drivers (such as Vickers, Ku. and Ky. Busch, R. Gordon, Hamlin, and McMurray gave NASCAR requests and calls to black-flag Earnhardt Jr. Earnhardt was penalized on two counts by NASCAR; first, he was sent to the tail end of the longest line for overaggressive driving, and the ensuing penalty meant he was not granted the beneficiary as a result. (A driver cannot cause the caution to be granted the beneficiary.) Brian Vickers was angry and said when interviewed "To wreck somebody intentionally like that in front of the entire field is really kind of dangerous. That's my biggest problem with it. But, apparently, (Earnhardt Jr.) wanted a caution pretty bad." Both Vickers and Earnhardt Jr. were a lap down before the wreck occurred, and Earnhardt Jr. was unaware that he was battling Vickers for the position. At this time, Kevin Harvick pushed Matt Kenseth into a battle for first between Kenseth and Sadler. On lap 138, Jeff Burton smacked the wall, collecting Paul Menard. Burton was then black-flagged for having a piece of sheetmetal hanging from his bumper.

On lap 146, Matt Kenseth took the lead from Sadler a lap after the action resumed. Almirola was then spun by Kasey Kahne after Almirola made contact with Sam Hornish Jr. on the backstretch. At this time, rain began to fall on the track under the yellow. On lap 152, the cars came into pit road under the red flag. Some drivers exited their cars while others, including Kenseth, remained in theirs. During the red flag period, asked what happened with Brian Vickers, Dale Earnhardt Jr. said, "I got a run on him and he (Vickers) saw me coming. I had a big old run on him and I went to the inside. I didn't try to make any late move and make some kind of surprise or anything. I just kind of ease on over and he went to block me and hit me in the fender sending us both off, sent me down into the grass and I tried to recover my car. I got back into him coming back into the racetrack." When asked what happened was accidental, Earnhardt Jr. was unrepentant and said, "Yeah, it was accidental. I didn't want to wreck the field." Later that week, Earnhardt Jr. gave a public apology for the incident and decided that he should have thought before he made his move that obviously would have crashed Vickers.

At 6:49 pm. EST, sixteen minutes after the start of the red flag, NASCAR officials decided to call the race declaring Kenseth as the winner. "It's going to be really wet out here because I'm crying like a baby," said Kenseth moments after the race was called. "I tell you what, after last year, winning a race means a lot to me," Kenseth later said who was winless in 2008. Harvick, winner of the Bud Shootout, was second. Richard Petty Motorsports drivers A. J. Allmendinger (#44), Sadler (#19), and Reed Sorenson (#43) finished 3rd, 5th, and 9th respectively. Michael Waltrip had the best finishing Toyota in the 7th. Stewart was 8th in his first race as a driver and team owner. Truex Jr. finished 11th, J. Gordon (Gatorade Duel No. 1 winner) finished 13th, Marcos Ambrose (in his first 500 starts) finished 17th, Johnson (the defending Series champion) finished 31st, Speed (the high-finishing rookie) finished 35th, Ryan Newman (the defending 500 winners) finished 36th, Ky. Busch (who led the most laps at 88 and won Gatorade Duel #2) finished 41st because of him being involved in the lap 124 multi-car crash, and Logano (also in his first Daytona 500 start also) finished 43rd.

=== Starting lineup ===
Pos	No.	Driver	Team	Manufacturer
1	1	Martin Truex Jr.	Earnhardt Ganassi Racing	Chevrolet
2	5	Mark Martin	Hendrick Motorsports	Chevrolet
3	24	Jeff Gordon (W)	Hendrick Motorsports	Chevrolet
4	18	Kyle Busch	Joe Gibbs Racing	Toyota
5	14^{*}	Tony Stewart	Stewart–Haas Racing	Chevrolet
6	83	Brian Vickers	Red Bull Racing Team	Toyota
7	48	Jimmie Johnson (W)	Hendrick Motorsports	Chevrolet
8	42	Juan Pablo Montoya	Earnhardt Ganassi Racing	Chevrolet
9	20	Joey Logano (R)	Joe Gibbs Racing	Toyota
10	11	Denny Hamlin	Joe Gibbs Racing	Toyota
11	8	Aric Almirola	Earnhardt Ganassi Racing	Chevrolet
12	96	Bobby Labonte	Hall of Fame Racing	Ford
13	2	Kurt Busch	Penske Championship Racing	Dodge
14	88	Dale Earnhardt Jr. (W)	Hendrick Motorsports	Chevrolet
15	9	Kasey Kahne	Richard Petty Motorsports	Dodge
16	99	Carl Edwards	Roush Fenway Racing	Ford
17	36	Scott Riggs	Tommy Baldwin Racing	Toyota
18	41	Jeremy Mayfield	Mayfield Motorsports	Toyota
19	98	Paul Menard	Yates Racing	Ford
20	44	A. J. Allmendinger	Richard Petty Motorsports	Dodge
21	26	Jamie McMurray	Roush Fenway Racing	Ford
22	33	Clint Bowyer	Richard Childress Racing	Chevrolet
23	47	Marcos Ambrose (R)	JTG Daugherty Racing	Toyota
24	12	David Stremme	Penske Championship Racing	Dodge
25	07	Casey Mears	Richard Childress Racing	Chevrolet
26	31	Jeff Burton	Richard Childress Racing	Chevrolet
27	55	Michael Waltrip (W)	Michael Waltrip Racing	Toyota
28	00	David Reutimann	Michael Waltrip Racing	Toyota
29	77^{*}	Sam Hornish Jr.	Penske Championship Racing	Dodge
30	19	Elliott Sadler	Richard Petty Motorsports	Dodge
31	7	Robby Gordon	Robby Gordon Motorsports	Toyota
32	29^{*}	Kevin Harvick (W)	Richard Childress Racing	Chevrolet
33	6	David Ragan	Roush Fenway Racing	Ford
34	43	Reed Sorenson	Richard Petty Motorsports	Dodge
35	16	Greg Biffle	Roush Fenway Racing	Ford
36	39^{*}	Ryan Newman (W)	Stewart–Haas Racing	Chevrolet
37	34^{*}	John Andretti	Front Row Motorsports	Chevrolet
38	82^{*}	Scott Speed (R)	Red Bull Racing Team	Toyota
39	17^{*}	Matt Kenseth	Roush Fenway Racing	Ford
40	21	Bill Elliott (W)	Wood Brothers Racing	Ford
41	28	Travis Kvapil	Yates Racing	Ford
42	78	Regan Smith	Furniture Row Racing	Chevrolet
43	66	Terry Labonte	Prism Motorsports	Toyota
Did not qualify
	87	Joe Nemechek	NEMCO Motorsports	Toyota
	08	Boris Said	Carter/Simo Racing	Ford
	09	Brad Keselowski	Phoenix Racing	Chevrolet
	27	Kirk Shelmerdine	Kirk Shelmerdine Racing	Toyota
	71	Mike Wallace	TRG Motorsports	Chevrolet
	37	Tony Raines	Front Row Motorsports	Dodge
	73	Mike Garvey	H&S Motorsports	Dodge
	75	Derrike Cope (W)	Cope/Keller Racing	Dodge
	23	Mike Skinner	R3 Motorsports	Chevrolet
	51	Kelly Bires (R)	BlackJack Racing	Dodge
	46	Carl Long	Carl Long Racing	Dodge
	64	Geoffrey Bodine (W)	Gunselman Motorsports	Toyota
	57	Norm Benning	Norm Benning Racing	Chevrolet
WD	60	James Hylton	E&M Motorsports	Dodge

* – NASCAR rules state that if a car, engine, or transmission change is made by the team, that car starts the race in the back of the field. For the Daytona 500, the rule applies to a car if a crash takes place in the Gatorade Duel or in the Friday or Saturday practice. An engine or transmission change is permitted after the Gatorade Duel, so the engine and transmission used in Friday practice must be used in Saturday practice and the race. The penalty for an engine or transmission change applies only if a second engine change is made after the Gatorade Duel once Friday practice begins.

=== Race results ===
Pos	Car No.	Driver	Make	Laps	Led	Status
1	17	Matt Kenseth	Ford	152	7	Running
2	29	Kevin Harvick (W)	Chevrolet	152	0	Running
3	44	A. J. Allmendinger	Dodge	152	0	Running
4	33	Clint Bowyer	Chevrolet	152	0	Running
5	19	Elliott Sadler	Dodge	152	24	Running
6	6	David Ragan	Ford	152	0	Running
7	55	Michael Waltrip (W)	Toyota	152	0	Running
8	14	Tony Stewart	Chevrolet	152	15	Running
9	43	Reed Sorenson	Dodge	152	0	Running
10	2	Kurt Busch	Dodge	152	0	Running
11	1	Martin Truex Jr.	Chevrolet	152	1	Running
12	00	David Reutimann	Toyota	152	0	Running
13	24	Jeff Gordon (W)	Chevrolet	152	14	Running
14	42	Juan Pablo Montoya	Chevrolet	152	0	Running
15	07	Casey Mears	Chevrolet	152	0	Running
16	5	Mark Martin	Chevrolet	152	1	Running
17	47	Marcos Ambrose (R)	Toyota	152	0	Running
18	99	Carl Edwards	Ford	152	0	Running
19	34	John Andretti	Chevrolet	152	0	Running
20	16	Greg Biffle	Ford	152	0	Running
21	78	Regan Smith	Chevrolet	152	0	Running
22	96	Bobby Labonte	Ford	152	1	Running
23	21	Bill Elliott (W)	Ford	152	0	Running
24	66	Terry Labonte	Toyota	152	0	Running
25	36	Scott Riggs	Toyota	152	0	Running
26	11	Denny Hamlin	Toyota	152	0	Running
27	88	Dale Earnhardt Jr. (W)	Chevrolet	152	1	Running
28	31	Jeff Burton	Chevrolet	152	0	Running
29	9	Kasey Kahne	Dodge	152	0	Running
30	8	Aric Almirola (R)	Chevrolet	152	0	Running
31	48	Jimmie Johnson (W)	Chevrolet	152	0	Running
32	77	Sam Hornish Jr.	Dodge	151	0	Running
33	12	David Stremme	Dodge	151	0	Running
34	7	Robby Gordon	Dodge	151	0	Running
35	82	Scott Speed (R)	Toyota	151	0	Running
36	39	Ryan Newman (W)	Chevrolet	150	0	Running
37	26	Jamie McMurray	Ford	139	0	Running
38	98	Paul Menard	Ford	138	0	Accident
39	83	Brian Vickers	Toyota	126	0	Accident
40	41	Jeremy Mayfield	Toyota	126	0	Running
41	18	Kyle Busch	Toyota	123	88	Accident
42	28	Travis Kvapil	Ford	90	0	Running
43	20	Joey Logano (R)	Toyota	79	0	Accident

Previous race: 2008 Ford 400	Sprint Cup Series; 2009 season	Next race: 2009 Auto Club 500
