= 2012 Irwin Tools Night Race =

Race details
- Race 24 of 36 in the 2012 NASCAR Sprint Cup Series
- The 2012 Irwin Tools Night Race program cover, featuring a moonshine bottle.
- Date: August 25, 2012
- Location: Bristol Motor Speedway in Bristol, Tennessee
- Course: Permanent racing facility
- Course length: 0.533 miles (0.858 km)
- Distance: 500 laps, 266.5 mi (428.89 km)
- Weather: Temperatures as low as 57.2 °F (14.0 °C); wind speeds up to 8.9 miles per hour (14.3 km/h)

Pole position
Driver	Casey Mears	Germain Racing
- Time: 15.701 (P1)

Most laps led
Driver	Joey Logano	Joe Gibbs Racing
- Laps: 139

Winner
No. 11	Denny Hamlin	Joe Gibbs Racing

Television in the United States
- Network: ABC
- Announcers: Allen Bestwick, Dale Jarrett and Andy Petree

The 2012 Irwin Tools Night Race was a NASCAR Sprint Cup Series stock car race held on August 25, 2012 at Bristol Motor Speedway in Bristol, Tennessee. Contested over 500 laps, it was the twenty-fourth race of the 2012 NASCAR Sprint Cup Series season.

Denny Hamlin of Joe Gibbs Racing won the race, his first at Bristol and third of the 2012 season. Jimmie Johnson finished second and Jeff Gordon was third. Nearly 150,000 people attended this 189-minute racing event.

This race was broadcast on ABC (through ESPN on ABC), but was not available in all areas. A handful of ABC affiliates aired NFL preseason football games, with most of the affected affiliates preempting the race altogether, although at least one joined the race in progress in its final hour. Because of this, WOTV in Battle Creek, Michigan was the only West Michigan ABC affiliate airing the race, as WZZM-TV in Grand Rapids, Michigan was simulcasting WXYZ-TV in Southfield, Michigan's Detroit Lions coverage and, unlike WXYZ-TV, chose not to join the race in progress, choosing to air syndicated programming instead.

== Qualifying ==
Sprint Cup qualifying was to begin on August 24 at 5:00pm EST after the Nationwide Series qualifying. Just before the Cup cars were to take their laps, rain poured on the track. As the Cup cars were unable to make time and with the Nationwide race to run on Friday night, NASCAR cancelled qualifying and set the field according to the following criteria: The field would consist of the Top 35 in owner's points and those with the most attempts. In the event that multiple teams have the same number of starts, preference is given to the team higher in owner's points. The field would be set by their lap times during the practice session.

As a result, Casey Mears, at a time of 15.701 seconds, won the pole, followed by Brad Keselowski, Greg Biffle, Joey Logano, and Aric Almirola. Four drivers would not race due to the number of attempts: Scott Speed, Kelly Bires, J. J. Yeley, and Reed Sorenson.

== Top 10 finishers ==
Pos	Grid	No.	Driver	Manufacturer	Laps	Laps led
1	8	11	Denny Hamlin	Toyota	500	70
2	37	48	Jimmie Johnson	Chevrolet	500	52
3	11	24	Jeff Gordon	Chevrolet	500	0
4	22	55	Brian Vickers	Toyota	500	1
5	9	9	Marcos Ambrose	Ford	500	1
6	10	18	Kyle Busch	Toyota	500	0
7	23	15	Clint Bowyer	Toyota	500	0
8	4	20	Joey Logano	Toyota	500	139
9	12	5	Kasey Kahne	Chevrolet	500	42
10	7	27	Paul Menard	Chevrolet	500	0

Previous race: 2012 Pure Michigan 400	Sprint Cup Series; 2012 season	Next race: 2012 AdvoCare 500
