= 2012 AdvoCare 500 (Phoenix) =

Car race

Race details
- Race 35 of 36 in the 2012 NASCAR Sprint Cup Series
- Map of the Phoenix International Raceway
- Date: November 11, 2012
- Location: Phoenix International Raceway, Avondale, Arizona
- Course: Permanent racing facility
- Course length: 1.6 km (1 miles)
- Distance: 319 laps, 319 mi (513.381 km)
- Weather: Clear with a temperature around 65 °F (18 °C); wind out of the NNW at 5 miles per hour (8.0 km/h).
- Average speed: 111.182 miles per hour (178.930 km/h)

Pole position
Driver	Kyle Busch	Joe Gibbs Racing
- Time: 25.943

Most laps led
Driver	Kyle Busch	Joe Gibbs Racing
- Laps: 237

Winner
No. 29	Kevin Harvick	Richard Childress Racing

Television in the United States
- Network: ESPN
- Announcers: Allen Bestwick, Dale Jarrett and Andy Petree

The 2012 AdvoCare 500 was a NASCAR Sprint Cup Series stock car race held on November 11, 2012, at Phoenix International Speedway in Avondale, Arizona. Contested over 319 laps on the 1-mile (1.6 km) asphalt tri-oval, it was the thirty-fifth race of the 2012 Sprint Cup Series season, as well as the ninth race in the ten-race Chase for the Sprint Cup, which ends the season. Kevin Harvick of Richard Childress Racing won the race, his only win of the season, while Denny Hamlin finished second and Kyle Busch finished third.

== Report ==
=== Background ===
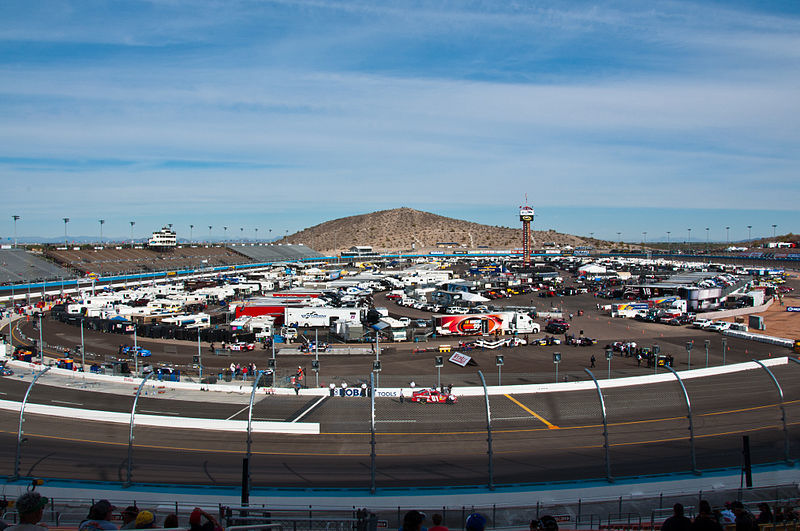
Phoenix International Raceway, where the race was held.

Phoenix International Raceway is one of five short tracks to hold NASCAR races; the others are Richmond International Raceway, Dover International Speedway, Bristol Motor Speedway, and Martinsville Speedway. The standard track at Phoenix International Raceway is a four-turn short track oval that is 1 mile (1.6 km) long. The first two turns are banked from 10 to 11 degrees, while the final two turns are banked from 8 to 9 degrees. The front stretch, the location of the finish line, is banked at three degrees. The back stretch, nicknamed the 'dogleg', varies from 10 to 11 degree banking. The racetrack has seats for 76,800 spectators.

Before the race, Jimmie Johnson led the Drivers' Championship with 2,339 points, and Brad Keselowski stood in second with 2,332 points. Clint Bowyer followed in third with 2,303 points, twenty-two points ahead of Kasey Kahne and thirty-six ahead of Matt Kenseth in fourth and fifth. Jeff Gordon with 2,267 was one point ahead of Denny Hamlin, as Tony Stewart with 2,259 points, was tied with Martin Truex Jr. and three ahead of Greg Biffle. Kevin Harvick and Dale Earnhardt Jr. was eleventh and twelfth with 2,238 and 2,188 points, respectively.

In the Manufacturers' Championship, Chevrolet led with 231 points, thirty points ahead of Toyota. Ford, with 167 points, was eighteen points ahead of Dodge in the battle for third. Kahne is the defending race winner after winning the event in 2011.

=== Last laps ===
The race was won by Kevin Harvick after a green-white-checkered finish. This finish was the direct result of a heated on-track altercation between Jeff Gordon and Clint Bowyer. This started when, on lap 310, Bowyer made contact with the back of Gordon's car, then, a few seconds later, made more contact with the front of Gordon's car, sending him into the wall. NASCAR declared that Gordon had put himself in the wall trying to retaliate, and decided to park him for what remained of the race. When Gordon learned his penalty, he slowed down but waited for Bowyer to come back around.

Then, on Lap 311, moments before Kevin Harvick crossed the start/finish line to begin the final lap (which would have ended the race due to the caution), Gordon made contact with the right rear of Bowyer's car, sending them spinning into both Joey Logano and the wall, also taking out Aric Almirola. NASCAR officials then summoned Gordon, his crew, and owner Rick Hendrick to the NASCAR hauler to discuss his actions.

After Gordon had exited his race car in the garage, the pit crew of Bowyer confronted him and a short scuffle broke out between the pit crews of Gordon and Bowyer. No members of either pit crew were injured, nor was Gordon. Shortly afterwards, Bowyer reached his pit box and after exiting his car, began running through the paddock area towards Gordon's car hauler to confront Gordon. However upon reaching the hauler, Bowyer was restrained by officials and immediately led off. Due to the tension created by the incident between the Bowyer and Gordon crews, NASCAR had police officers stationed around the garages to avoid further altercations. While Harvick celebrated in victory lane, Gordon said "Clint's run into me numerous times during this year and I just had enough and got him back." The next week, NASCAR fined Jeff Gordon $100,000, 100 driver's points, and probation until December 31. NASCAR's initial decision was to park Gordon for the Miami race but Gordon and boss Rick Hendrick fought their way into being allowed to race the final event, which he ended up winning over Bowyer. During the Miami weekend event, NASCAR fined Gordon's crew chief Alan Gustafson $50,000 for not controlling his driver and crews from committing the wreck, Clint Bowyer's crew chief Brian Pattie $35,000 for swearing on TV and Hendrick $5,000 for not controlling his driver.

Previous race: 2012 AAA Texas 500	Sprint Cup Series; 2012 season	Next race: 2012 Ford EcoBoost 400
