= 2012 Tums Fast Relief 500 =

Race details
- Race 33 of 36 in the 2012 NASCAR Sprint Cup Series
- Date: October 28, 2012
- Location: Martinsville Speedway, Ridgeway, Virginia
- Course: Permanent racing facility
- Course length: .526 miles (.847 km)
- Distance: 500 laps, 263 mi (423 km)
- Weather: Rain showers with the temperature around 54 °F (12 °C); wind out of the NNW at 10 miles per hour (16 km/h).

Pole position
Driver	Jimmie Johnson	Hendrick Motorsports
- Time: 19.402 seconds

Most laps led
Driver	Jimmie Johnson	Hendrick Motorsports
- Laps: 193

Winner
No. 48	Jimmie Johnson	Hendrick Motorsports

Television in the United States
- Network: ESPN
- Announcers: Allen Bestwick, Dale Jarrett and Andy Petree

The 2012 Tums Fast Relief 500 was a NASCAR Sprint Cup Series stock car race held on October 28, 2012 at Martinsville Speedway in Ridgeway, Virginia. Contested over 500 laps on the 0.526-mile (0.847 km) oval, it was the thirty-third race of the 2012 Sprint Cup Series season, as well as the seventh race in the ten-race Chase for the Sprint Cup, which ends the season. Jimmie Johnson won the race, while Kyle Busch finished second, and Kasey Kahne clinched third. Chevrolet clinched their 36th Manufacturers Championship with Jimmie's win.

== Report ==
=== Background ===
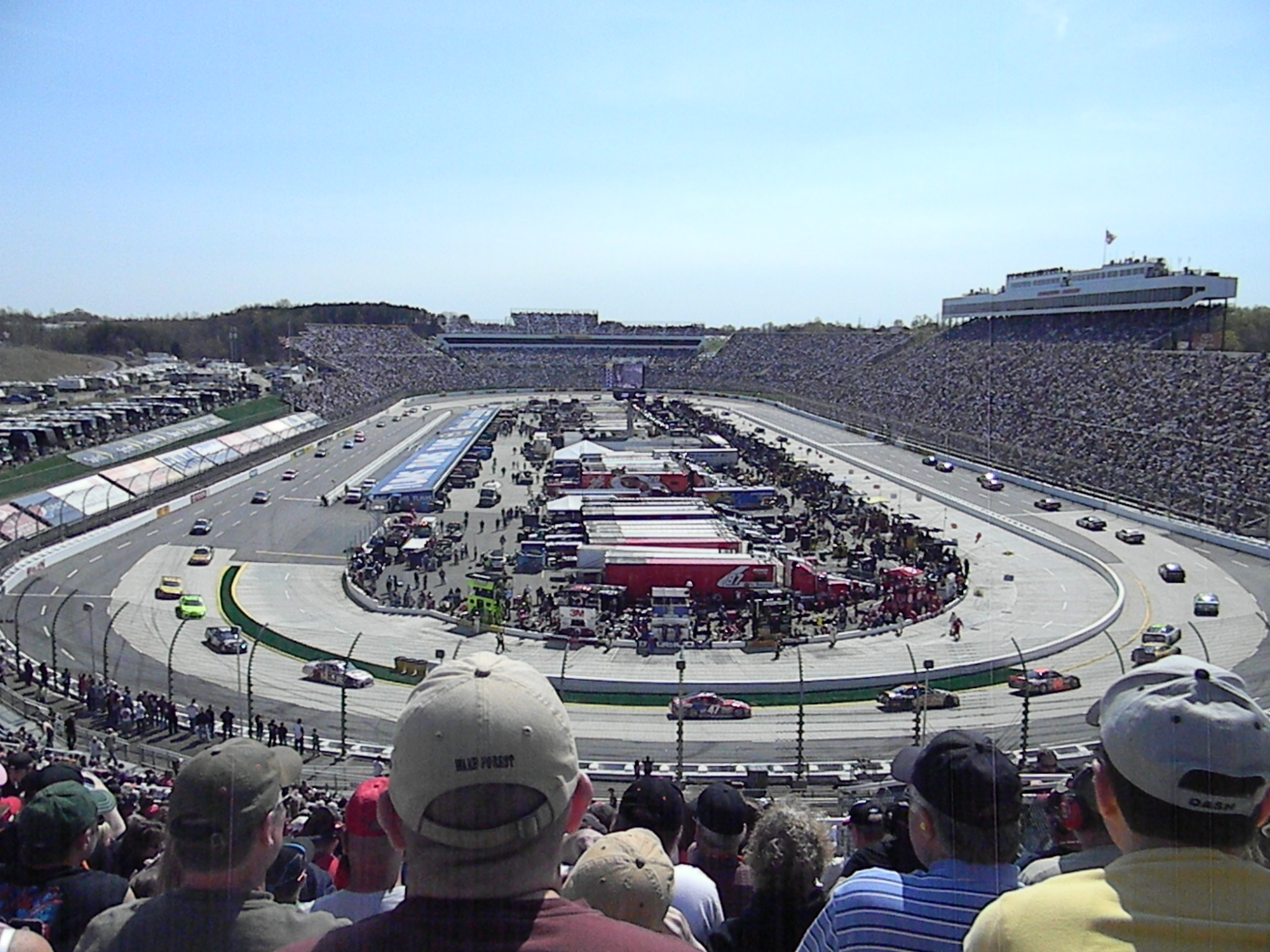
Martinsville Speedway, the race track where the race was held.

Martinsville Speedway is one of five short tracks to hold NASCAR races. The standard track at Martinsville Speedway is a four-turn short track oval that is 0.526 miles (0.847 km) long. The track's turns are banked at eleven degrees, while the front stretch, the location of the finish line, is banked at zero degrees. The back stretch also has a zero degree banking. The racetrack has seats for 63,000 spectators.

Before the race, Brad Keselowski led the Drivers' Championship with 2,250 points, and Jimmie Johnson stood in second with 2,243 points. Denny Hamlin followed in third with 2,230 points, five points ahead of Clint Bowyer and ten ahead of Kasey Kahne in fourth and fifth. Martin Truex Jr. with 2,207 was four points ahead of Tony Stewart, as Jeff Gordon with 2,199 points, was four points ahead of Matt Kenseth and eight ahead of Kevin Harvick. Greg Biffle and Dale Earnhardt Jr. was eleventh and twelfth with 2,188 and 2,128 points, respectively.

In the Manufacturers' Championship, Chevrolet was leading with 213 points, twenty-two points ahead of Toyota. Ford, with 160 points, was twenty points ahead of Dodge in the battle for third. Stewart was the defending race winner after winning the event in 2011.

=== Practice and qualifying ===
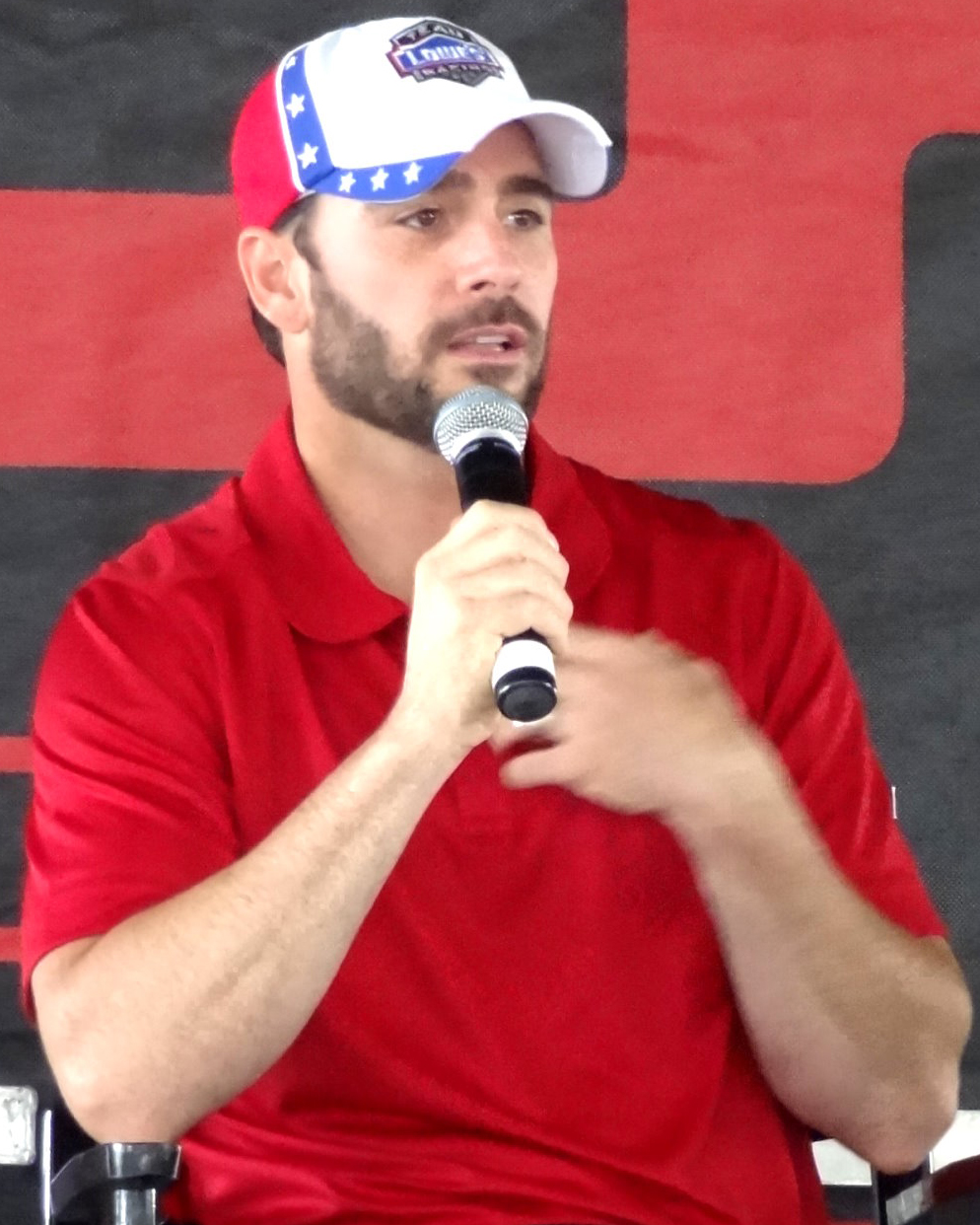
Jimmie Johnson won the pole position, his third of the 2012 season.

Three practice sessions are scheduled to be held before the race; the first on Friday, which lasted 90 minutes. The second and third are both scheduled on Saturday afternoon for 55 minutes each. Brian Vickers was quickest with a time of 19.386 seconds in the first session, 0.038 seconds faster than Earnhardt Jr. Hamlin was just off Earnhardt, Jr's pace, followed by Gordon, Bowyer, and Paul Menard. Johnson was seventh, still within a tenth of a second of Vicker's time.

Forty-five cars were entered for qualifying, but only forty-three could qualify for the race because of NASCAR's qualifying procedure. Johnson clinched the twenty-eighth pole position of his career and third of the season, with a time of 19.402 seconds. He was joined on the front row of the grid by Vickers. Kyle Busch qualified third, Jeff Burton took fourth, and Hamlin started fifth. Kenseth, Stewart, Bowyer, Menard] and Aric Almirola rounded out the top ten. Keselowski only managed thirty-second. The two drivers that failed to qualify for the race were Mike Bliss, and J. J. Yeley.

Once the qualifying session was completed, Johnson commented, "After qualifying as poorly as I did in the spring, I focused on these two laps pretty heavily and wanted to make sure I did my job. We just hit it [Friday], from the car standpoint, from my standpoint of driving the race track. We got it right [Friday]. The tough position there is, once we get single-file and we're about 10 laps into the show, the leaders are [caught up] to the 43rd-place car. You've got to go, and everybody around you has that same mentality, too, so it can be pretty cutthroat back there."

In the second practice session, Vickers remained fastest with a time of 19.732 seconds, less than two-hundredths of a second quicker than second-placed Gordon. Juan Pablo Montoya took third place, ahead of Johnson, Kyle Busch and Bowyer. Hamlin only managed eleventh place, while Keselowski was only quick enough for twenty-seventh position. In the third and final practice, Vickers was quickest with a time of 19.751 seconds. Earnhardt Jr. followed in second, ahead of Gordon and Kyle Busch. Hamlin was fifth quickest, with a time of 19.830 seconds. Johnson, Menard, Ryan Newman, Kenseth, and Bowyer rounded out the first ten positions.

=== Race results ===
Pos	Grid	Car	Driver	Team	Manufacturer	Laps	Points
1	1	48	Jimmie Johnson	Hendrick Motorsports	Chevrolet	500	48
2	3	18	Kyle Busch	Joe Gibbs Racing	Toyota	500	42
3	15	5	Kasey Kahne	Hendrick Motorsports	Chevrolet	500	42
4	10	43	Aric Almirola	Richard Petty Motorsports	Ford	500	40
5	8	15	Clint Bowyer	Michael Waltrip Racing	Toyota	500	40
6	32	2	Brad Keselowski	Penske Racing	Dodge	500	39
7	11	24	Jeff Gordon	Hendrick Motorsports	Chevrolet	500	38
8	2	55	Brian Vickers	Michael Waltrip Racing	Toyota	500	37
9	17	47	Bobby Labonte	JTG Daugherty Racing	Toyota	500	35
10	30	16	Greg Biffle	Roush-Fenway Racing	Ford	500	34
Only the first ten positions are listed.

== Standings after the race ==
Drivers' Championship standings

	Pos	Driver	Points
1	1	Jimmie Johnson	2,291
1	2	Brad Keselowski	2,289 (–2)
1	3	Clint Bowyer	2,265 (–26)
1	4	Kasey Kahne	2,262 (–29)
2	5	Denny Hamlin	2,242 (–49)
2	6	Jeff Gordon	2,237 (–54)
1	7	Martin Truex Jr.	2,228 (–63)
1	8	Matt Kenseth	2,226 (–65)
2	9	Greg Biffle	2,222 (–69)
3	10	Tony Stewart	2,220 (–71)
1	11	Kevin Harvick	2,203 (–88)
	12	Dale Earnhardt Jr.	2,151 (–140)

Manufacturers' Championship standings

Pos	Manufacturer	Points
1	Chevrolet	222
2	Toyota	197 (–25)
3	Ford	164 (–58)
4	Dodge	143 (–79)

- Note: Only the first twelve positions are included for the driver standings.

Previous race: 2012 Hollywood Casino 400	Sprint Cup Series; 2012 season	Next race: 2012 AAA Texas 500
