= 2012 Hollywood Casino 400 =

Race details
- Race 32 of 36 in the 2012 NASCAR Sprint Cup Series
- Kansas Speedway
- Date: October 21, 2012
- Location: Kansas Speedway, Kansas City, Kansas, United States
- Course: Permanent racing facility
- Course length: 1.5 miles (2.4 km)
- Distance: 267 laps, 400 mi (644.542 km)
- Weather: Temperatures reaching up to 77 °F (25 °C); wind speeds up to 9.9 miles per hour (15.9 km/h)
- Average speed: 115.086 miles per hour (185.213 km/h)

Pole position
Driver	Kasey Kahne	Hendrick Motorsports
- Time: 28.219

Most laps led
Driver	Matt Kenseth	Roush Fenway Racing
- Laps: 78

Winner
No. 17	Matt Kenseth	Roush Fenway Racing

Television in the United States
- Network: ESPN
- Announcers: Allen Bestwick, Dale Jarrett, and Andy Petree

The 2012 Hollywood Casino 400 was a NASCAR Sprint Cup Series stock car race held on October 21, 2012, at Kansas Speedway in Kansas City, Kansas. Contested over 267 laps on the 1.5-mile (2.4 km) asphalt quad-oval, it was the thirty-second race of the 2012 Sprint Cup Series season, as well as the sixth race in the ten-race Chase for the Sprint Cup, which ends the season. Matt Kenseth of Roush Fenway Racing won the race, his third of the season. Martin Truex Jr. finished second and Paul Menard was third.

== Results ==
=== Race results ===
Pos	Car	Driver
1	17	Matt Kenseth
2	56	Martin Truex Jr.
3	27	Paul Menard
4	5	Kasey Kahne
5	14	Tony Stewart
6	15	Clint Bowyer
7	88	Regan Smith
8	2	Brad Keselowski
9	48	Jimmie Johnson
10	24	Jeff Gordon
11	29	Kevin Harvick
12	9	Marcos Ambrose
13	11	Denny Hamlin
14	99	Carl Edwards
15	1	Jamie McMurray
16	42	Juan Pablo Montoya
17	93	Travis Kvapil
18	83	Landon Cassill
19	20	Joey Logano
20	34	David Ragan
21	21	Trevor Bayne
22	32	Timmy Hill
23	38	David Gilliland
24	55	Mark Martin
25	78	Kurt Busch
26	22	Sam Hornish Jr.
27	16	Greg Biffle
28	31	Jeff Burton
29	43	Aric Almirola
30	39	Ryan Newman
31	18	Kyle Busch
32	10	Danica Patrick
33	47	Bobby Labonte
34	95	Scott Speed
35	51	AJ Almendinger
36	19	Mike Bliss
37	13	Casey Mears
38	79	Kelly Bires
39	36	Dave Blaney
40	87	Joe Nemechek
41	91	Reed Sorenson
42	37	J. J. Yeley
43	98	Michael McDowell

== Standings after the race ==
Drivers' Championship standings

	Pos	Driver	Points
	1	Brad Keselowski	2250
	2	Jimmie Johnson	2243 (–7)
	3	Denny Hamlin	2230 (–20)
	4	Clint Bowyer	2225 (–25)
	5	Kasey Kahne	2220 (–30)
1	6	Martin Truex Jr.	2207 (–43)
1	7	Tony Stewart	2203 (–47)
1	8	Jeff Gordon	2199 (–51)
2	9	Matt Kenseth	2195 (–55)
	10	Kevin Harvick	2191 (–59)
5	11	Greg Biffle	2188 (–62)
	12	Dale Earnhardt Jr.	2128 (–122)

Manufacturers' Championship standings

Pos	Manufacturer	Points
1	Chevrolet	213
2	Toyota	191 (–22)
3	Ford	160 (–43)
4	Dodge	140 (–63)

- Note: Only the top twelve positions are included for the driver standings.

Previous race: 2012 Bank of America 500	Sprint Cup Series; 2012 season	Next race: 2012 Tums Fast Relief 500
