= 2009 Chase for the Sprint Cup =

NASCAR playoff

The 2009 Chase for the Sprint Cup was the ten-race playoff that determined the champion of the 2009 NASCAR Sprint Cup Series, contested among the top twelve drivers following the Chevy Rock and Roll 400 on September 12 at Richmond International Raceway. The entire chase was broadcast on ABC in the USA and TSN 2 in Canada.

== Format ==
For the second year, the twelve drivers who qualified for the Chase had their point totals reset to 5,000 points, with a ten-point bonus for each race they won prior to the Chase. The driver who earns the most points at the end of the Chase will be declared the 2009 series champion.

== Changes ==
This year's changes were where the ten races will be. Atlanta Motor Speedway's fall date, the Pep Boys Auto 500, was switched to the Labor Day weekend, and Auto Club Speedway, which hosts the Pepsi 500, took the space in the race schedule. Talladega Superspeedway's date, the AMP Energy 500 was in return, moved to Atlanta's date with Auto Club moving into Talladega's original position.

== Races ==
Date	Race	Site	Time (US ET)	2008 Winner	2009 Winner
9/20	2009 Sylvania 300	New Hampshire Motor Speedway	1 PM	Greg Biffle	Mark Martin
9/27	2009 AAA 400	Dover International Speedway	1 PM	Greg Biffle	Jimmie Johnson
10/4	2009 Price Chopper 400	Kansas Speedway	1 PM	Jimmie Johnson	Tony Stewart
10/11	2009 Pepsi 500	Auto Club Speedway	2:30 PM	Jimmie Johnson §	Jimmie Johnson
10/17	2009 NASCAR Banking 500 only from Bank of America	Lowe's Motor Speedway	7 PM	Jeff Burton	Jimmie Johnson
10/25	2009 TUMS Fast Relief 500	Martinsville Speedway	1 PM	Jimmie Johnson	Denny Hamlin
11/1	2009 AMP Energy 500	Talladega Superspeedway	1 PM	Tony Stewart	Jamie McMurray^{‡}
11/8	2009 Dickies 500	Texas Motor Speedway	2:30 PM	Carl Edwards	Kurt Busch
11/15	2009 Checker O'Reilly Auto Parts 500	Phoenix International Raceway	2:30 PM	Jimmie Johnson	Jimmie Johnson
11/22	2009 Ford 400	Homestead Miami Speedway	2:30 PM	Carl Edwards	Denny Hamlin

‡ – Ineligible for the Chase as he did not finish in Top 12.

== Qualified Drivers ==
The 12 drivers who have qualified for the chase after the Chevy Rock and Roll 400

- Tony Stewart (Stewart Haas Racing #14 Chevrolet)
- Jimmie Johnson (Hendrick Motorsports #48 Chevrolet)
- Jeff Gordon (Hendrick Motorsports #24 Chevrolet)
- Denny Hamlin (Joe Gibbs Racing #11 Toyota)
- Carl Edwards (Roush Fenway Racing #99 Ford)
- Kasey Kahne (Richard Petty Motorsports #9 Dodge)
- Kurt Busch (Penske Racing #2 Dodge)
- Juan Pablo Montoya (Earnhardt Ganassi Racing #42 Chevrolet)
- Ryan Newman (Stewart Haas Racing #39 Chevrolet)
- Mark Martin (Hendrick Motorsports #5 Chevrolet)
- Greg Biffle (Roush Fenway Racing #16 Ford)
- Brian Vickers (Red Bull Racing Team #83 Toyota)

== Standings ==
Rank Current/Pre-Chase		Driver	Points/(Behind)		Poles	Wins Pre-Chase/Overall		Top 5	Top 10
1	1	Mark Martin	5040	Leader	6	4	4	9	14
2	2	Tony Stewart	5030	(−10)	0	3	3	13	18
3	3	Jimmie Johnson	5030	(−10)	1	3	3	9	15
4	4	Denny Hamlin	5020	(−20)	0	2	2	9	14
5	5	Kasey Kahne	5020	(−20)	0	2	2	5	10
6	6	Jeff Gordon	5010	(−30)	0	1	1	12	18
7	7	Kurt Busch	5010	(−30)	0	1	1	7	14
8	8	Brian Vickers	5010	(−30)	6	1	1	4	13
9	9	Carl Edwards	5000	(−40)	0	0	0	7	11
10	10	Ryan Newman	5000	(−40)	1	0	0	5	12
11	11	Juan Pablo Montoya	5000	(−40)	1	0	0	2	12
12	12	Greg Biffle	5000	(−40)	0	0	0	8	12

== Results ==
NOTE: Standings in Cup points before the race in parentheses.

=== Race One: 2009 Sylvania 300 ===
Results:

1. Mark Martin (1)
2. Denny Hamlin (4)
3. Juan Pablo Montoya (11)
4. Jimmie Johnson (3)
5. Kyle Busch
6. Kurt Busch (6)
7. Ryan Newman (7)
8. Elliott Sadler
9. Greg Biffle (12)
10. Clint Bowyer

Other Chase drivers:

11. Brian Vickers (8)
14. Tony Stewart (2)
15. Jeff Gordon (6)
17. Carl Edwards (9)
38. Kasey Kahne (5)

Point Standings:

1. Mark Martin 5,230 points
2. Jimmie Johnson – 35
3. Denny Hamlin – 35 (Third by tiebreaker)
4. Juan Pablo Montoya – 55
5. Kurt Busch – 65
6. Tony Stewart – 76
7. Ryan Newman – 79
8. Brian Vickers – 90
9. Greg Biffle – 92
10. Jeff Gordon – 102
11. Carl Edwards – 113
12. Kasey Kahne – 161

=== Race Two: 2009 AAA 400 ===
Results:

1. Jimmie Johnson (2)
2. Mark Martin (1)
3. Matt Kenseth
4. Juan Pablo Montoya (4)
5. Kurt Busch (5)
6. Jeff Gordon (10)
7. A. J. Allmendinger
8. Kasey Kahne (12)
9. Tony Stewart (6)
10. Ryan Newman (7)

Other Chase drivers:

11. Carl Edwards (11)
13. Greg Biffle (9)
18. Brian Vickers (8)
22. Denny Hamlin (3)

Point Standings:

1. Mark Martin 5,400 points
2. Jimmie Johnson – 10
3. Juan Pablo Montoya – 65
4. Kurt Busch – 75
5. Tony Stewart – 106
6. Denny Hamlin – 108
7. Ryan Newman – 110
8. Jeff Gordon – 122
9. Greg Biffle – 138
10. Brian Vickers – 151
11. Carl Edwards – 153
12. Kasey Kahne – 189

=== Race Three: 2009 Price Chopper 400 ===
Results:

1. Tony Stewart (5)
2. Jeff Gordon (8)
3. Greg Biffle (9)
4. Juan Pablo Montoya (4)
5. Denny Hamlin (6)
6. Kasey Kahne (12)
7. Mark Martin (1)
8. David Reutimann
9. Jimmie Johnson (2)
10. Carl Edwards (11)

Other Chase drivers:

11. Kurt Busch (4)
22. Ryan Newman (7)
37. Brian Vickers (10)

Point Standings:

1. Mark Martin 5,551 points
2. Jimmie Johnson – 18
3. Juan Pablo Montoya – 51
4. Tony Stewart – 67
5. Kurt Busch – 91
6. Denny Hamlin – 99
7. Jeff Gordon – 103
8. Greg Biffle – 114
9. Ryan Newman – 164
10. Carl Edwards – 165
11. Kasey Kahne – 190
12. Brian Vickers – 250

=== Race Four: 2009 Pepsi 500 ===
Results:

1. Jimmie Johnson (2)
2. Jeff Gordon (7)
3. Juan Pablo Montoya (3)
4. Mark Martin (1)
5. Tony Stewart (4)
6. Carl Edwards (10)
7. David Ragan
8. Kurt Busch (5)
9. Clint Bowyer
10. Kevin Harvick

Other Chase drivers:

13. Ryan Newman (9)
20. Greg Biffle (8)
29. Brian Vickers (12)
34. Kasey Kahne (11)
37. Denny Hamlin (6)

Point Standings:

1. Jimmie Johnson 5728 points
2. Mark Martin – 12
3. Juan Pablo Montoya – 58
4. Tony Stewart – 84
5. Jeff Gordon – 105
6. Kurt Busch – 121
7. Greg Biffle – 188
8. Carl Edwards – 192
9. Denny Hamlin – 219
10. Ryan Newman – 223
11. Kasey Kahne – 306
12. Brian Vickers – 351

=== Race Five: 2009 NASCAR Banking 500 Only from Bank of America ===
Results:

1. Jimmie Johnson (1)
2. Matt Kenseth
3. Kasey Kahne (11)
4. Jeff Gordon (5)
5. Joey Logano
6. Clint Bowyer
7. Casey Mears
8. Kyle Busch
9. Martin Truex, Jr.
10. Kurt Busch (6)

Other Chase drivers:

11. Ryan Newman (10)
13. Tony Stewart (4)
16. Greg Biffle (7)
17. Mark Martin (2)
34. Brian Vickers (12)
35. Juan Pablo Montoya (3)
39. Carl Edwards (8)
42. Denny Hamlin (9)

Point Standings:

1. Jimmie Johnson 5933 points
2. Mark Martin – 90
3. Jeff Gordon – 135
4. Tony Stewart – 155
5. Kurt Busch – 177
6. Juan Pablo Montoya – 195
7. Greg Biffle – 268
8. Ryan Newman – 288
9. Kasey Kahne – 331
10. Carl Edwards – 341
11. Denny Hamlin – 372
12. Brian Vickers – 485

=== Race Six: 2009 TUMS Fast Relief 500 ===
Results:

1. Denny Hamlin (11)
2. Jimmie Johnson (1)
3. Juan Pablo Montoya (6)
4. Kyle Busch
5. Jeff Gordon (3)
6. Jamie McMurray
7. Ryan Newman (8)
8. Mark Martin (2)
9. Tony Stewart (4)
10. Kevin Harvick

Other Chase drivers:

11. Brian Vickers (12)
17. Kurt Busch (5)
20. Carl Edwards (10)
25. Greg Biffle (7)
32. Kasey Kahne (9)

Point Standings:

1. Jimmie Johnson 6098 points
2. Mark Martin – 118
3. Jeff Gordon – 150
4. Tony Stewart – 192
5. Juan Pablo Montoya – 200
6. Kurt Busch – 240
7. Ryan Newman – 312
8. Greg Biffle – 350
9. Denny Hamlin – 352
10. Carl Edwards – 413
11. Kasey Kahne – 439
12. Brian Vickers – 530

=== Race Seven: 2009 AMP Energy 500 ===
Results:

1. Jamie McMurray
2. Kasey Kahne (11)
3. Joey Logano
4. Greg Biffle (8)
5. Jeff Burton
6. Jimmie Johnson (1)
7. Michael Waltrip
8. Brad Keselowski
9. Elliott Sadler
10. Bobby Labonte

Other Chase drivers:

13. Brian Vickers (12)
14. Carl Edwards (10)
19. Juan Pablo Montoya (5)
20. Jeff Gordon (3)
28. Mark Martin (2)
30. Kurt Busch (6)
35. Tony Stewart (4)
36. Ryan Newman (7)
38. Denny Hamlin (9)

Point Standings:

1. Jimmie Johnson 6248 points
2. Mark Martin –184
3. Jeff Gordon –192
4. Juan Pablo Montoya –239
5. Tony Stewart –279
6. Kurt Busch –312
7. Greg Biffle –340
8. Ryan Newman –402
9. Kasey Kahne –414
10. Carl Edwards –437
11. Denny Hamlin –448
12. Brian Vickers –551

Preceded by 2008 Chase for the Sprint Cup	NASCAR seasons 2009	Succeeded by 2010 Chase for the Sprint Cup
