= 2009 Sunoco Red Cross Pennsylvania 500 =

Race details
- Race 21 of 36 in the 2009 NASCAR Sprint Cup Series
- Pocono Raceway, the race track where the race was held.
- Date: August 3, 2009
- Official name: Sunoco Red Cross Pennsylvania 500
- Location: Pocono Raceway Long Pond, Pennsylvania
- Course: Permanent racing facility
- Course length: 2.500 miles (4.023 km)
- Distance: 200 laps, 500 mi (804.67 km)
- Weather: Temperatures reaching up to 79 °F (26 °C); with wind speeds climbing up to 7 miles per hour (11 km/h)
- Attendance: 80,000

Pole position
Driver	Tony Stewart	Stewart–Haas Racing

Most laps led
Driver	Denny Hamlin	Joe Gibbs Racing
- Laps: 91

Winner
No. 11	Denny Hamlin	Joe Gibbs Racing

Television in the United States
- Network: ESPN
- Announcers: Dr. Jerry Punch, Dale Jarrett and Andy Petree

The 2009 Sunoco Red Cross Pennsylvania 500 was a NASCAR Sprint Cup Series stock car race held on August 3, 2009, at Pocono Raceway in Long Pond, Pennsylvania. Contested over 200 laps, it was the twenty-first race of the 2009 Sprint Cup Series season. Denny Hamlin, driving for Joe Gibbs Racing, won the race.

It took three hours fifty-seven minutes to complete. Juan Pablo Montoya was humbly given a second-place finish by being .869 seconds slower than Hamlin. Eight drivers failed to finish the race; including last-place finisher Mike Wallace who parked his car on lap 13. Derrike Cope's vehicle was too slow to qualify for the race. Previous-day rain forced a competition caution on lap 22; most other yellow flags after this one were mainly for debris or accidents. Nearly 20% of the race was held under the caution flag; with a green flag run lasting an average of nearly 15 laps.

== Top ten finishers ==
Pos	Grid	No.	Driver	Manufacturer	Laps	Laps led
1	6	11	Denny Hamlin	Toyota	200	91
2	10	42	Juan Pablo Montoya	Chevrolet	200	0
3	16	33	Clint Bowyer	Chevrolet	200	23
4	29	77	Sam Hornish Jr.	Dodge	200	0
5	8	9	Kasey Kahne	Dodge	200	35
6	15	83	Brian Vickers	Toyota	200	0
7	9	5	Mark Martin	Chevrolet	200	10
8	3	24	Jeff Gordon	Chevrolet	200	0
9	4	2	Kurt Busch	Dodge	200	14
10	1	14	Tony Stewart	Chevrolet	200	0

== Timeline ==
- Start of race: Jimmie Johnson began the race in first place
- Lap 13: Mike Wallace decided to park his vehicle even though nothing was wrong with it
- Lap 17: The power steering malfunctioned in Tony Raines' vehicle
- Lap 24: David Gilliand's alternator stopped working properly
- Lap 26: Dave Blaney managed to overheat his vehicle
- Lap 30: Ignition problems forced Joe Nemechek out of the race
- Lap 36: Transmission issues caused Sterling Marlin to exit the race prematurely
- Lap 38: Patrick Carpentier's race weekend would be over due to a faulty transmission
- Lap 180: Bobby Labonte had a terminal crash; forcing him to retire from the race early
- Finish: Denny Hamlin was officially declared the winner of the event

== Standings after the race ==
Pos	Driver	Points
1	Tony Stewart	3188
2	Jimmie Johnson	2991
3	Jeff Gordon	2989
4	Kurt Busch	2751
5	Denny Hamlin	2713
