= 2009 Budweiser Shootout =

Race details
- Race 1 of 2 Exhibition Races in the 2009 NASCAR Sprint Cup Series
- Date: February 7, 2009
- Location: Daytona International Speedway, Daytona Beach, Florida
- Course: Permanent racing facility
- Course length: 2.5 miles (4 km)
- Distance: 78 laps, 195 mi (313.82 km)
- Scheduled distance: 75 laps, 187.5 mi (301.75 km)
- Weather: Temperatures from 35.6 °F (2.0 °C) to 66.2 °F (19.0 °C); wind speeds up to 10.24 mph (16.48 km/h)
- Average speed: 168.56 mph (271.27 km/h)
- Attendance: 80,000

Pole position
Driver	Paul Menard	Yates Racing
- Time: N/A

Most laps led
Driver	Dale Earnhardt Jr.	Hendrick Motorsports
- Laps: 23

Winner
No. 29	Kevin Harvick	Richard Childress Racing

Television in the United States
- Network: Fox Broadcasting Network
- Announcers: Mike Joy, Darrell Waltrip, Larry McReynolds
- Nielsen ratings: 4.9/9 (Final); 4.1/7 (Overnight); (8,300,000 million)

The 2009 Budweiser Shootout was the first exhibition stock car race of the 2009 NASCAR Sprint Cup Series. The 31st annual running of the Budweiser Shootout, it was held on February 7, 2009, in Daytona Beach, Florida, at Daytona International Speedway, before a crowd of 80,000 people. Richard Childress Racing's Kevin Harvick won the 78-lap race, after he started from the next-to-last 27th position. Roush Fenway Racing's Jamie McMurray finished in second, and Stewart–Haas Racing's Tony Stewart was third.

Pole position starter Paul Menard was passed by Elliott Sadler on the third lap. Dale Earnhardt Jr. took the lead for the first time on lap four, and led a total of 23 laps, more than any other driver. Carl Edwards assumed the lead on lap 17, holding it until a caution flag was issued on lap 25. During the caution all the teams made a scheduled ten-minute pit stop. On the 41st lap, Earnhardt retook the lead, which he maintained until the 50th lap, when Matt Kenseth passed him. McMurray became the leader on lap 66, and held it until Harvick overtook him on the final lap to win the event.

Harvick took his first Sprint Cup Series victory since the 2007 Nextel All-Star Challenge, and Richard Childress Racing's had its first Budweiser Shootout win since the 1995 edition. Eight cautions were issued during the race, which saw an event-record 23 lead changes among 14 drivers, and attracted 8.3 million television viewers.

== Background ==
Daytona International Speedway, where the race was held.

The 2009 Budweiser Shootout was the first of two exhibition stock car races of the 2009 NASCAR Sprint Cup Series, and the event's 31st annual edition. It was held on February 7, 2009, in Daytona Beach, Florida, at Daytona International Speedway, a superspeedway that holds NASCAR races. The standard track at Daytona International Speedway is a four-turn 2.5 mi (4.0 km) superspeedway. The track's turns are banked at 31 degrees, while the front stretch, the location of the finish line, is banked at 18 degrees.

The Budweiser Shootout was created by Busch Beer brand manager Monty Roberts as the Busch Clash in 1979. The race, designed to promote Busch Beer, invites the fastest NASCAR drivers from the previous season to compete. The race is considered a "warm-up" for the Daytona 500. It was renamed the Bud Shootout in 1998. The name changed to the Budweiser Shootout in 2001, the Sprint Unlimited in 2013 and the Advance Auto Parts Clash in 2017.

There were 28 cars eligible to enter the race, including the top six teams from each of the series' four manufacturers (Chevrolet, Dodge, Ford, and Toyota) based on owners' points from the 2008 season. In addition to the initial 24 cars, each of the four manufacturers gained one "wild card" berth for a car or driver not already qualified, for previous Cup Series champions, and past Shootout winners based on the 2008 owners' points. The race was 75 laps long (up from 70 laps in the 2008 race), with two segments of 25 and 50 laps. A ten-minute pit stop was scheduled in between segments. Teams could change tires, add fuel, and make regular chassis tweaks in either the garage or on pit road during the pit stop, but could not change springs, shock absorbers or rear-ends. The race was then restarted one lap behind the pace car. The race counted both caution and green flag laps. Dale Earnhardt Jr. was the race's defending champion.

== Practice and qualifying ==
Two practice sessions were held on the afternoon of February 6 before the race. The first session lasted 45 minutes, and the second 60 minutes. Kyle Busch led the first practice session, held in clear and cool weather, with a 47.009 seconds lap, more than 0.070 seconds faster than the second-placed Jimmie Johnson, who was recovering from a cut finger he sustained on his left hand while altering his racing uniform with a kitchen knife at the 2009 24 Hours of Daytona endurance race. Matt Kenseth was third fastest, ahead of Reed Sorenson, A. J. Allmendinger and Earnhardt Jr. Carl Edwards was seventh, still within one second of Kyle Busch's time. In the second practice session, Johnson was fastest at 46.724 seconds, followed by Allmendinger, Earnhardt, Kasey Kahne, Tony Stewart, Greg Biffle, Bobby Labonte, Jamie McMurray, Kyle Busch and Scott Speed.

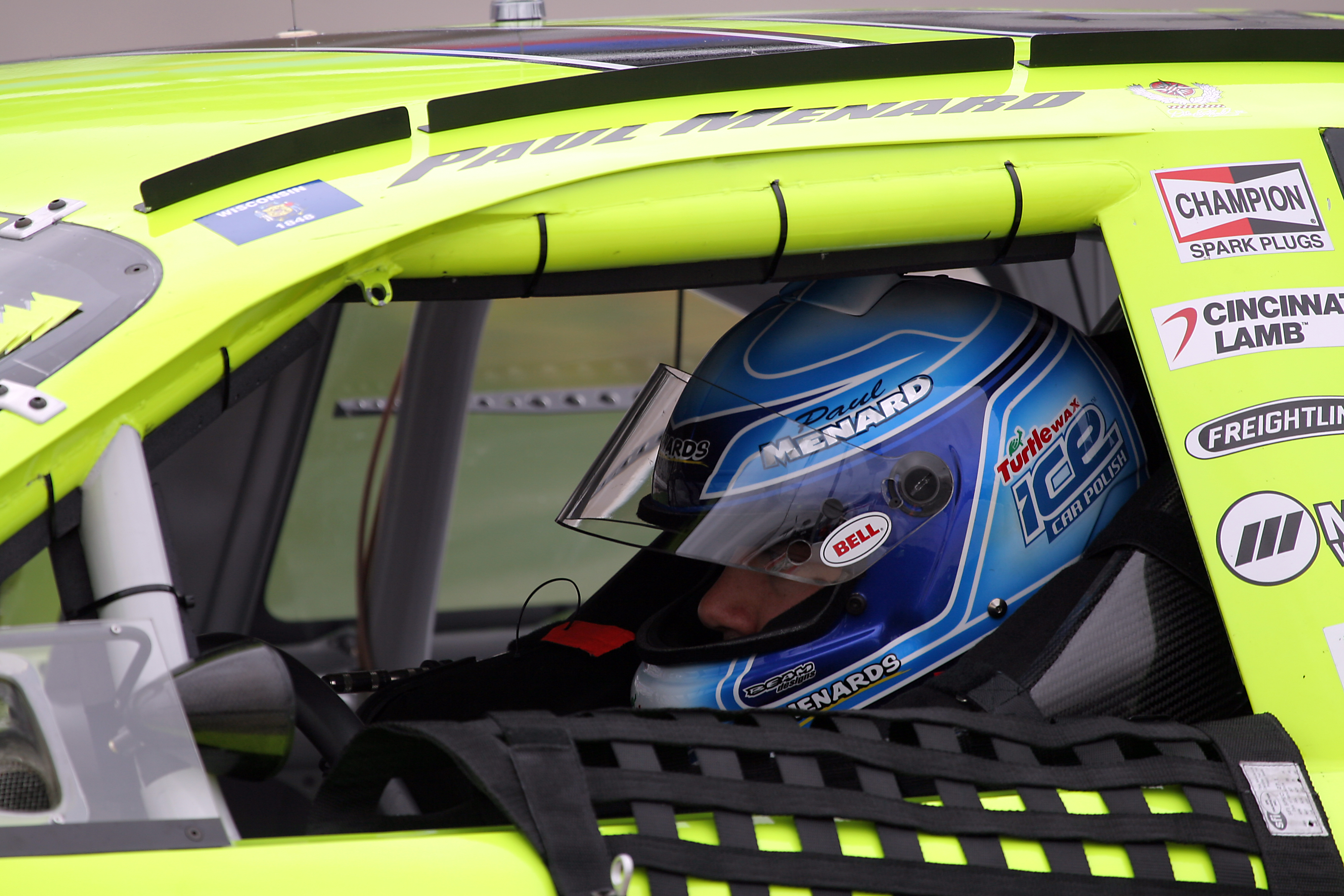
Paul Menard (pictured in 2007) picked the pole position for Yates Racing.

Paul Menard was traveling through the first curve during the second practice session when his right-rear tire deflated, leading him to spin sideways. Speed was close behind him, and despite slowing, he collided with Menard's right-front quarter panel. Both cars spun across the track, and stopped in the infield grass. Speed's vehicle had minor damage, but Menard's car was taken to the garage area. Menard was transported and released from the infield care center for treatment. His car was repaired. Soon after, Sorenson collided with Kyle Busch's vehicle's right-rear corner with the front of his car, and his teammate Kahne suffered damage to his car's right-hand part after striking the outside barrier beside the track at the first turn. Jeff Burton's engine failed on the third lap of his second practice session, and his team changed engines. Edwards swerved to avoid hitting debris that detached from David Reutimann's car at high speed.

For qualifying, the 28 drivers drew their starting positions by a lot, a feature that is unique to the event. Menard chose the pole position, ahead of Elliott Sadler, Sorenson, Speed and Denny Hamlin in second through fifth. Stewart drew sixth place, Brian Vickers seventh, Labonte eighth, Earnhardt ninth, and Kyle Busch tenth. The next five places were drawn by Edwards, Kurt Busch, Robby Gordon, Kahne, and McMurray. David Ragan, who drew 16th, was followed by Michael Waltrip, Allmendinger, Joey Logano, and David Stremme in the first 20 positions. Johnson, Reutimann, Burton, Casey Mears, Kenseth, Biffle, Kevin Harvick, and Jeff Gordon chose the final eight starting positions. Once the lot was completed, Menard commented, "That's pretty cool, By the time I drew there were about four numbers at the front and three back near 17th and 18th so I felt like I had a pretty good shot at getting a good starting position."

=== Qualifying results ===
Pos	No.	Driver	Team	Manufacturer
1	98	Paul Menard	Yates Racing	Ford
2	19	Elliott Sadler	Richard Petty Motorsports	Dodge
3	43	Reed Sorenson	Richard Petty Motorsports	Dodge
4	82	Scott Speed	Red Bull Racing Team	Toyota
5	11	Denny Hamlin	Joe Gibbs Racing	Toyota
6	14	Tony Stewart	Stewart–Haas Racing	Chevrolet
7	83	Brian Vickers	Red Bull Racing Team	Toyota
8	96	Bobby Labonte	Hall of Fame Racing	Ford
9	88	Dale Earnhardt Jr.	Hendrick Motorsports	Chevrolet
10	18	Kyle Busch	Joe Gibbs Racing	Toyota
11	99	Carl Edwards	Roush Fenway Racing	Ford
12	2	Kurt Busch	Penske Championship Racing	Dodge
13	7	Robby Gordon	Robby Gordon Motorsports	Dodge
14	9	Kasey Kahne	Richard Petty Motorsports	Dodge
15	26	Jamie McMurray	Roush Fenway Racing	Ford
16	6	David Ragan	Roush Fenway Racing	Ford
17	55	Michael Waltrip	Michael Waltrip Racing	Toyota
18	44	A. J. Allmendinger	Richard Petty Motorsports	Dodge
19	20	Joey Logano	Joe Gibbs Racing	Toyota
20	12	David Stremme	Penske Championship Racing	Dodge
21	48	Jimmie Johnson	Hendrick Motorsports	Chevrolet
22	00	David Reutimann	Michael Waltrip Racing	Toyota
23	31	Jeff Burton	Richard Childress Racing	Chevrolet
24	07	Casey Mears	Richard Childress Racing	Chevrolet
25	17	Matt Kenseth	Roush Fenway Racing	Ford
26	16	Greg Biffle	Roush Fenway Racing	Ford
27	29	Kevin Harvick	Richard Childress Racing	Chevrolet
28	24	Jeff Gordon	Hendrick Motorsports	Chevrolet
^{1} Moved to the back of the grid for changing engines (#31), and for missing the pre-race driver's meeting (#20)

== Race ==
The 75-lap race began on February 7 at 8:10 p.m. Eastern Standard Time (UTC−05:00), and was televised live in the United States on Fox. Commentary was provided by lap-by-lap analyst Mike Joy, with analysis from three-time Cup Series champion Darrell Waltrip, and former crew chief Larry McReynolds. Around the start of the race, weather conditions were clear but cool. L. Ronald Durham, pastor of Greater Friendship Missionary Baptist Church in Daytona Beach, began pre-race ceremonies with an invocation. Vocalist Catina Mack from Orlando performed the national anthem, and country music singer Dierks Bentley commanded the drivers to start their engines. During the pace laps, Burton fell to the rear of the field because he changed his car's engine, and Logano did the same for missing the mandatory pre-race drivers' meeting due to him participating in the track's ARCA Re/Max Series race, which ended later than scheduled.

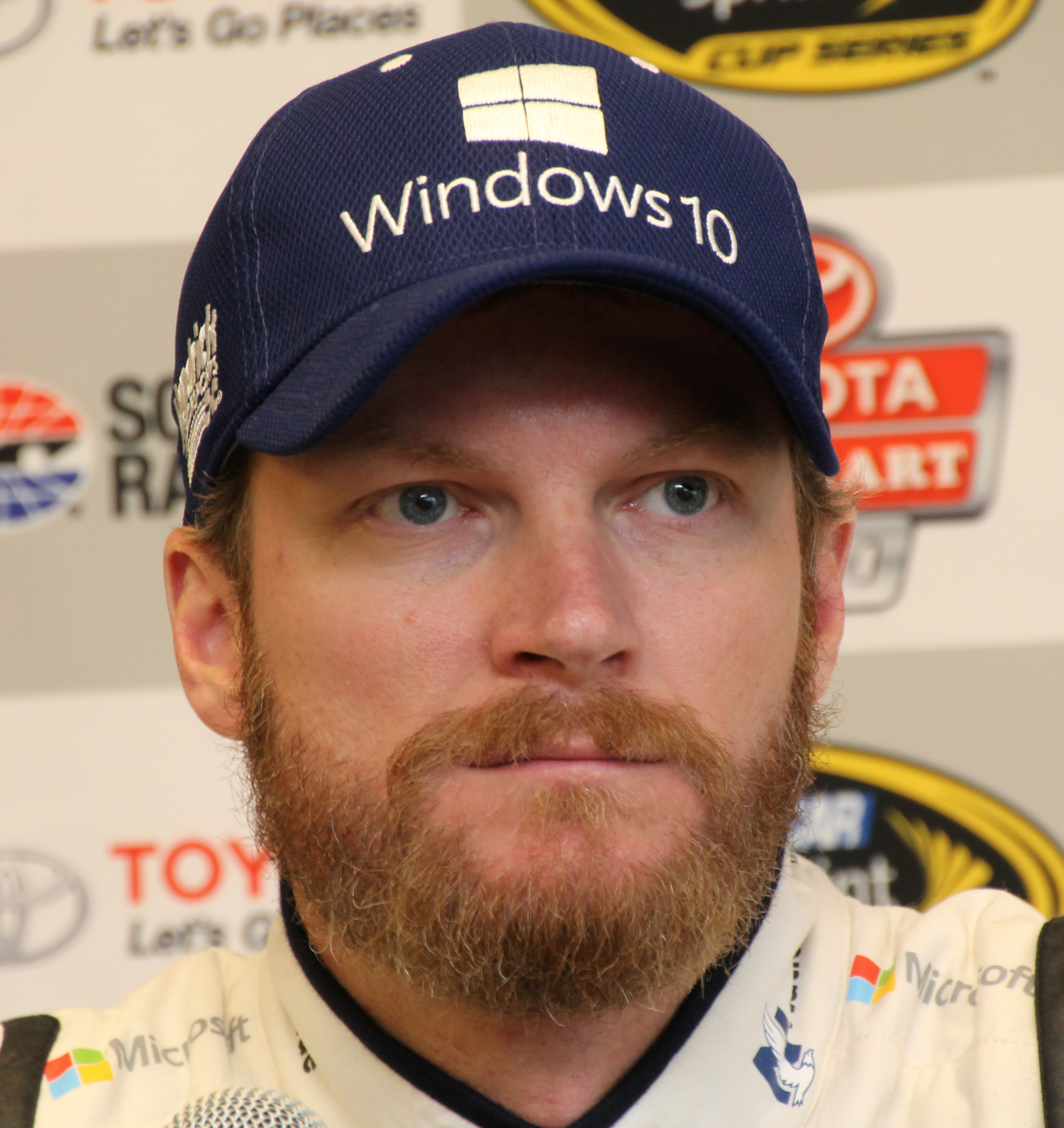
Dale Earnhardt Jr. (pictured in 2015) led a total of 24 laps, more than any other driver, before being eliminated from contention in a four-car accident on lap 65.

On lap one, Menard led entering the back stretch. On lap two, the leading seven cars were in a single file until the lap ended, when side-by-side racing commenced. Sadler assisted Hamlin in passing Menard for the lead on the third lap. Earnhardt turned left to overtake Hamlin for the lead on lap four. That same lap, Ragan appeared to slow behind Johnson; Robby Gordon hit Ragan's rear, sending him into the right-hand barrier. Speed, Logano and Mears were collected, causing the first caution. Biffle's car sustained minor cosmetic damage as the involved cars slid down the track, and Jeff Gordon avoided the multi-car accident. Logano and Speed retired from the race due to significant car damage. The race restarted on lap nine, with Earnhardt leading and Sadler in second. Two laps later, Sadler passed Earnhardt for the lead. He and Kurt Busch were first and second as the field began lap 13, but Stewart and Kahne moved into the top two places exiting the first turn. As the 14th lap approached, Kahne slid up the track and just avoided colliding with Hamlin, while Vickers and Harvick collided; no caution was required in either case.

On lap 17, Hamlin temporarily took the lead from Stewart, but Edwards led the race at the end of the lap. Stremme separated the field into two with his advance through it. Harvick slowed after being driven into the right-hand wall, removing his front left fender, and fell five seconds behind the pack. At the end of the 22nd lap, Hamlin slid and regained control of his car into the turn-four tri-oval. On lap 23, Hamlin turned left on the back straight exiting turn two, but he collided with Reutimann, who then clipped the front-right quarter of Stremme's vehicle, spinning both drivers into the grass and causing the second caution. Both drivers continued. During the caution, all of the teams completed their ten-minute pit stops before returning to the track for the restart. McMurray passed his teammate Edwards on lap 26. On the 27th lap, Kahne took the lead. He held it until Kyle Busch passed him later that lap. Kyle Busch received no assistance from Johnson, and Kahne regained the lead. McMurray took the lead on lap 29, but was passed by Jeff Gordon on the inside on the following lap. On lap 31, McMurray retook the lead from Gordon.

That lap, Jeff Gordon dropped behind in the middle lane, and Vickers hit the back of his car. Gordon clipped Biffle's rear and left sides, sending him into Johnson's path and collecting Mears, Burton, and Allmendinger; a third caution was issued, during which most of the leaders, including McMurray, made pit stops for fuel and tires. Kyle Busch led at the lap-36 restart. One lap later, Sorenson's engine failed, ending his race, and bringing out a fourth caution due to oil on the track. Earnhardt's teammate Jeff Gordon helped him to pass Kyle Busch for the lead for the second time at the lap-41 restart. Earnhardt and Jeff Gordon created a single file as the former led the next eight laps. In the meantime, Waltrip was pushed by Sadler and hit the right-hand wall on the back straight. Kenseth overtook Earnhardt on lap 50, but Earnhardt regained the lead on the next lap. A fifth caution was issued five laps later after a three-car crash involving Reutimann, Stremme, and Sadler entering the first turn. Every driver made pit stops for fuel and tires. Edwards and Kyle Busch ran into the infield grass during the pit stops as the nearest drivers ran four abreast entering turn one.

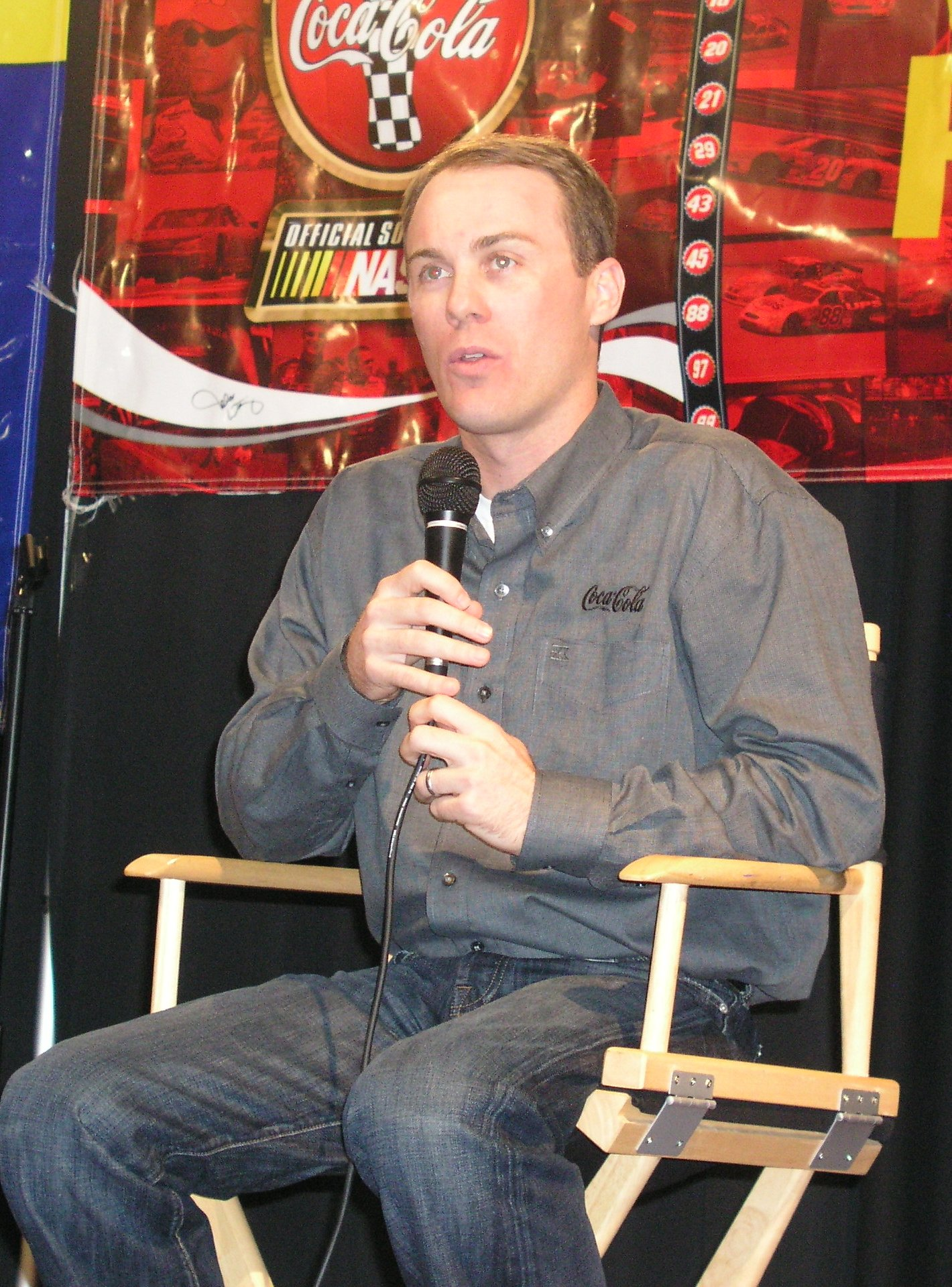
Kevin Harvick (pictured in 2006) passed Jamie McMurray on the final lap after receiving assistance from Denny Hamlin to win the race.

Kyle Busch took the lead from Earnhardt at the pit stops, and held it at the lap-59 restart. On the next lap, Johnson helped his teammate Earnhardt reclaim the lead on the outside lane. Jeff Gordon took it on lap 61 before an oversteer dropped Earnhardt to the rear of the pack. Johnson led the following two laps until Vickers passed him exiting turn two on the 64th lap. On that lap, Menard lost control of his car exiting the fourth turn, colliding with Earnhardt, who collided with Labonte on his way to the right-hand wall, prompting a sixth caution. Mears might have hit Biffle. McMurray led the field to the restart on lap 69, followed by Johnson and Kyle Busch. McMurray got loose in front of Johnson and Kyle Busch exiting turn four, but retained the lead. On the 71st lap, Kenseth and Johnson steered to the left, and McMurray did the same. Johnson fell to fifth after being bumped to the right. McMurray held off Kenseth on the outside line during lap 72. On the next lap, Jeff Gordon went left to try and get ahead of McMurray, but did not succeed. McMurray's lead was reduced to nothing, as a seventh caution was issued on lap 73, when Stremme slid into Biffle's rear, sending Biffle into the right-hand barrier; the two were connected until they reached the infield grass.

The race restarted on the 77th lap, for a green–white–checkered finish (extending the race to 78 laps) with McMurray leading Jeff Gordon, Johnson, and Harvick. Exiting the first turn, a large amount of bump drafting occurred. On the final lap, Hamlin gave Harvick assistance on the right to maintain Harvick's momentum on the backstretch, enabling Harvick to pass McMurray for the lead. Johnson went into the side of Hamlin and Mears between turns three and four after being bumped by Stewart. Kahne then collided with Kyle Busch's rear, and the two crashed. Vickers could not steer away, and was collected. The eighth (and final) caution came out, and the field was frozen in place, with the order of finish determined by where the drivers were when the caution began. This gave Harvick the victory, his first in the Cup Series since another exhibition event 71 races prior, the 2007 Nextel All-Star Challenge. It was also Richard Childress Racing's first Budweiser Shootout win since the 1995 edition. McMurray finished second, Stewart third, Jeff Gordon fourth, and Allmendinger fifth. Kahne, Edwards, Kenseth, Kurt Busch, and Kyle Busch completed the top ten. There were an event-record 23 lead changes among a record 14 different drivers during the course of the race. Earnhardt led four times for a total of 23 laps, more than any other driver. Harvick led once for a single lap.

=== Post-race comments ===
Harvick appeared in Victory Lane to celebrate his win in front of the crowd of 80,000 people; the win earned him $200,000. He said the win was reminiscent of his final-lap pass on Mark Martin in the 2007 Daytona 500 and a multi-car accident occurred behind him: "We got behind early, lost the draft and I was thinking, 'Man, we won the Daytona 500 the same way,' Just never giving up. If that's not fun to watch, I don't know what is. I had gotten squeezed up in the wall and knocked the left-front fender off. It seemed like we were in the wrong spot for the whole race. But we ended up in the right place when it mattered." McMurray said he was disappointed to lose the win after failing to block Harvick. "I saw (Harvick) coming, I moved up and I thought I was high enough," he said. "I didn't think there was room between him and the wall, and he just snuck in there. You feel like a sucker when you're in the front of this deal." Stewart, who finished third in his first race as a team owner, was satisfied with the result with his new crew chief Darian Grubb: "It really put me at ease I guess the whole night. Just hearing his confidence on the radio gave me confidence. We led laps tonight. We were a factor at parts of the night. I think everybody at some point of the night was vulnerable and able to fall to the back and get freight-trained."

Ragan suggested that Robby Gordon had lost focus when he hit him on lap five. "It's just a typical deal here at Daytona and Talladega", he said. "When someone gets checked up usually two or three rows back someone doesn't see it." Logano said of his involvement in the accident, "You start in the back and that's kind of what happens, [I] just saw one [car] get loose, checked up and then saw he was coming down so I floored ahead to the apron and just [got] clipped enough to send me back head-on into the wall." Speed called the crash an instance of being in the "wrong place" at the "wrong time" and referred to his second practice session accident with Menard. "Kind of a thing that happens around here – it's racing. The cars are so heavy and they're going so fast it's not actually a lot of reacting that you can do. Sometimes it works out and you go through there looking like a hero and sometimes it doesn't. It didn't work out the best, but still it's better than nothing."

Some drivers and crew chiefs raised concerns during and after the event about the Car of Tomorrow's handling on Daytona International Speedway's variable track surface. Kyle Busch argued the car was unsuitable for the circuit due to balance issues, and Labonte said it was "pretty erratic" and its handling was not to his liking. McMurray said he felt no loss of car control. Todd Parrott, Labonte's crew chief, believed there were few handling changes from previous editions of the event, and Reutimann concurred. "I wouldn't say it's much different than usual", he said. "They're kind of a handful, which is kind of how they are." The race attracted 8,300,000 million television viewers, and drew a final Nielsen rating with a 4.9 rating over a 9 share. It took one hour, 31 minutes, and 57 seconds to complete; because it ended under caution, no margin of victory was recorded.

=== Race results ===
Pos	Grid	No.	Driver	Team	Manufacturer	Laps
1	27	29	Kevin Harvick	Richard Childress Racing	Chevrolet	78
2	15	26	Jamie McMurray	Roush Fenway Racing	Ford	78
3	6	14	Tony Stewart	Stewart–Haas Racing	Chevrolet	78
4	28	24	Jeff Gordon	Hendrick Motorsports	Chevrolet	78
5	18	44	A. J. Allmendinger	Richard Petty Motorsports	Dodge	78
6	14	9	Kasey Kahne	Richard Petty Motorsports	Dodge	78
7	11	99	Carl Edwards	Roush Fenway Racing	Ford	78
8	25	17	Matt Kenseth	Roush Fenway Racing	Ford	78
9	12	2	Kurt Busch	Penske Championship Racing	Dodge	78
10	10	18	Kyle Busch	Joe Gibbs Racing	Toyota	78
11	7	83	Brian Vickers	Red Bull Racing Team	Toyota	78
12	1	98	Paul Menard	Yates Racing	Ford	78
13	5	11	Denny Hamlin	Joe Gibbs Racing	Toyota	78
14	21	48	Jimmie Johnson	Hendrick Motorsports	Chevrolet	77
15	24	07	Casey Mears	Richard Childress Racing	Chevrolet	77
16	20	12	David Stremme	Penske Championship Racing	Dodge	73
17	26	16	Greg Biffle	Roush Fenway Racing	Ford	72
18	9	88	Dale Earnhardt Jr.	Hendrick Motorsports	Chevrolet	64
19	8	96	Bobby Labonte	Hall of Fame Racing	Ford	63
20	22	00	David Reutimann	Michael Waltrip Racing	Toyota	56
21	2	19	Elliott Sadler	Richard Petty Motorsports	Dodge	54
22	17	55	Michael Waltrip	Michael Waltrip Racing	Toyota	43
23	3	43	Reed Sorenson	Richard Petty Motorsports	Dodge	36
24	23	31	Jeff Burton	Richard Childress Racing	Chevrolet	32
25	4	82	Scott Speed	Red Bull Racing Team	Toyota	4
26	16	6	David Ragan	Roush Fenway Racing	Ford	3
27	13	7	Robby Gordon	Robby Gordon Motorsports	Dodge	3
28	19	20	Joey Logano	Joe Gibbs Racing	Toyota	3
