= 2009 Pep Boys Auto 500 =

Race details
- Race 25 of 36 in the 2009 NASCAR Sprint Cup Series
- Atlanta Motor Speedway
- Date: September 6, 2009
- Location: Atlanta Motor Speedway, Hampton, Georgia
- Course: Permanent racing facility
- Course length: 1.54 miles (2.48 km)
- Distance: 325 laps, 500.5 mi (805.5 km)
- Weather: Temperatures reaching a maximum of 84.9 °F (29.4 °C); wind speeds up to 8 miles per hour (13 km/h)

Pole position
Driver	Martin Truex Jr.	Earnhardt Ganassi Racing

Most laps led
Driver	Martin Truex Jr.	Earnhardt Ganassi Racing
- Laps: 68

Winner
No. 9	Kasey Kahne	Richard Petty Motorsports

Television in the United States
- Network: ESPN
- Announcers: Dr. Jerry Punch, Dale Jarrett and Andy Petree

The 2009 Pep Boys Auto 500 was a NASCAR Sprint Cup Series stock car race that was held on September 6, 2009, at Atlanta Motor Speedway in Hampton, Georgia. Contested over 325 laps, it was the twenty-fifth race of the 2009 Sprint Cup Series season. Kasey Kahne, driving for Richard Petty Motorsports, won the race, while Kevin Harvick and Juan Pablo Montoya finished second and third respectively.

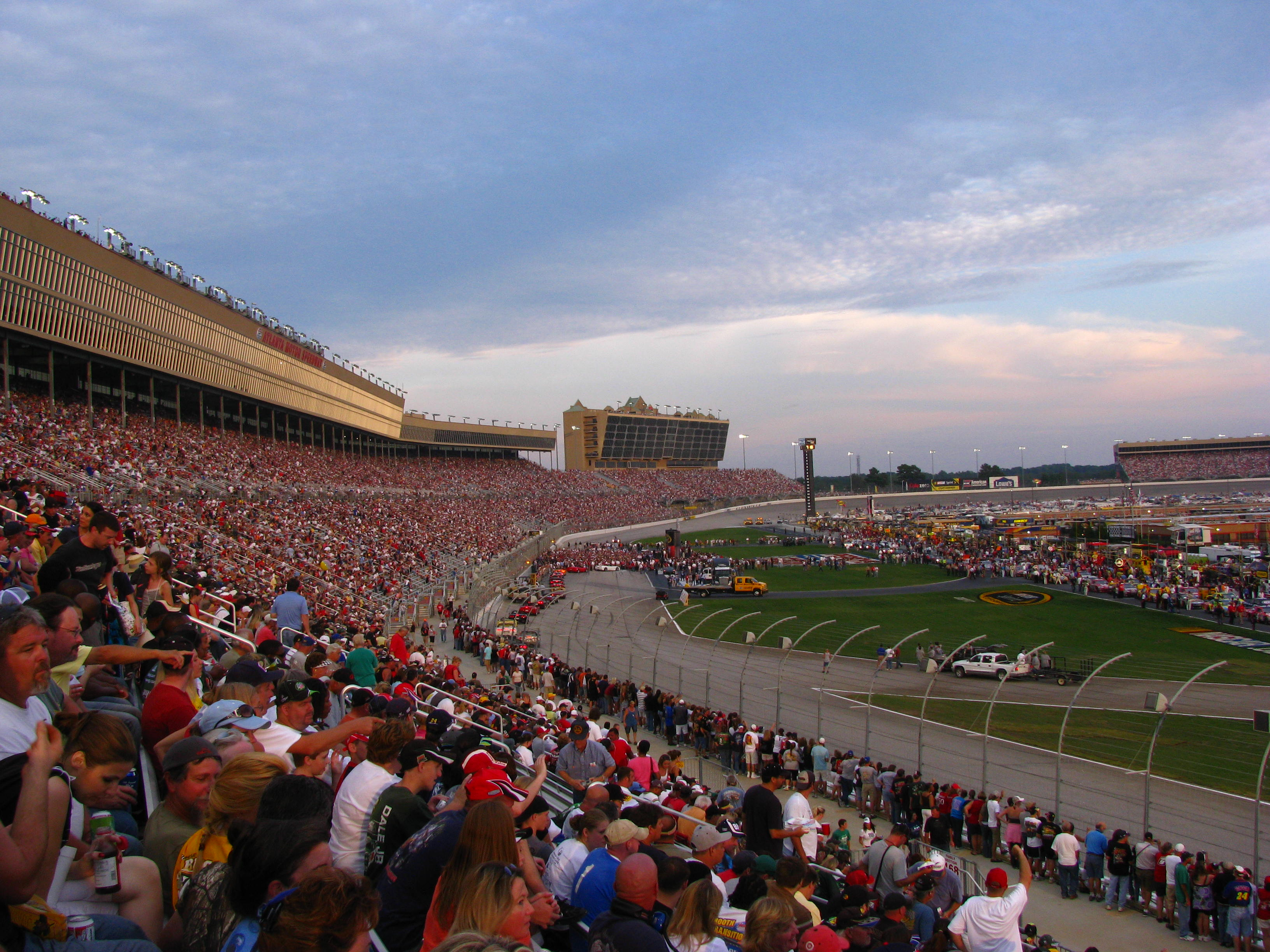
Pre-Race Events.

== Race results ==
Pos.	Grid	No.	Driver	Team	Manufacturer	Laps	Points
1	2	9	Kasey Kahne	Richard Petty Motorsports	Dodge	325	190
2	18	29	Kevin Harvick	Richard Childress Racing	Chevrolet	325	175
3	22	42	Juan Pablo Montoya	Earnhardt Ganassi Racing	Chevrolet	325	170
4	28	00	David Reutimann	Michael Waltrip Racing	Toyota	325	160
5	7	5	Mark Martin	Hendrick Motorsports	Chevrolet	325	155
6	10	11	Denny Hamlin	Joe Gibbs Racing	Toyota	325	155
7	8	83	Brian Vickers	Red Bull Racing Team	Toyota	325	151
8	4	24	Jeff Gordon	Hendrick Motorsports	Chevrolet	325	147
9	23	39	Ryan Newman	Stewart–Haas Racing	Chevrolet	325	143
10	26	16	Greg Biffle	Roush Fenway Racing	Ford	325	139
11	12	14	Tony Stewart	Stewart–Haas Racing	Chevrolet	325	130
12	15	17	Matt Kenseth	Roush Fenway Racing	Ford	325	132
13	5	18	Kyle Busch	Joe Gibbs Racing	Toyota	325	129
14	9	12	David Stremme	Penske Racing	Dodge	325	121
15	41	98	Paul Menard	Yates Racing	Ford	325	118
16	29	7	Robby Gordon	Robby Gordon Motorsports	Toyota	325	115
17	31	88	Dale Earnhardt Jr.	Hendrick Motorsports	Chevrolet	325	112
18	25	71	Bobby Labonte	TRG Motorsports	Chevrolet	325	109
19	17	21	David Gilliland	Wood Brothers Racing	Ford	325	106
20	35	44	A. J. Allmendinger	Richard Petty Motorsports	Dodge	325	103
21	21	19	Elliott Sadler	Richard Petty Motorsports	Dodge	325	100
22	34	20	Joey Logano	Joe Gibbs Racing	Toyota	324	97
23	11	47	Marcos Ambrose	JTG Daugherty Racing	Toyota	324	94
24	32	82	Scott Speed	Red Bull Racing Team	Toyota	324	91
25	33	07	Casey Mears	Richard Childress Racing	Chevrolet	324	88
26	1	1	Martin Truex Jr.	Earnhardt Ganassi Racing	Chevrolet	324	95
27	13	43	Reed Sorenson	Richard Petty Motorsports	Dodge	324	82
28	27	26	Jamie McMurray	Roush Fenway Racing	Ford	323	79
29	20	33	Clint Bowyer	Richard Childress Racing	Chevrolet	323	76
30	42	96	Erik Darnell	Hall of Fame Racing	Ford	323	73
31	40	34	John Andretti	Front Row Motorsports	Chevrolet	323	70
32	19	55	Michael Waltrip	Michael Waltrip Racing	Toyota	323	72
33	16	6	David Ragan	Roush Fenway Racing	Ford	322	64
34	24	31	Jeff Burton	Richard Childress Racing	Chevrolet	322	61
35	30	77	Sam Hornish Jr.	Penske Racing	Dodge	320	58
36	3	48	Jimmie Johnson	Hendrick Motorsports	Chevrolet	303	60
37	14	99	Carl Edwards	Roush Fenway Racing	Ford	302	52
38	6	2	Kurt Busch	Penske Racing	Dodge	244	49
39	43	08	Terry Labonte	John Carter Racing	Toyota	148	46
40	39	13	Max Papis	Germain Racing	Toyota	100	43
41	38	09	Mike Bliss	Phoenix Racing	Dodge	38	40
42	36	87	Joe Nemechek	NEMCO Motorsports	Toyota	25	37
43	37	66	Dave Blaney	Prism Motorsports	Toyota	19	34

Previous race: 2009 Sharpie 500	Sprint Cup Series; 2009 season	Next race: 2009 Chevy Rock & Roll 400
