= 2009 NASCAR Sprint Cup Series =

American motorsport season

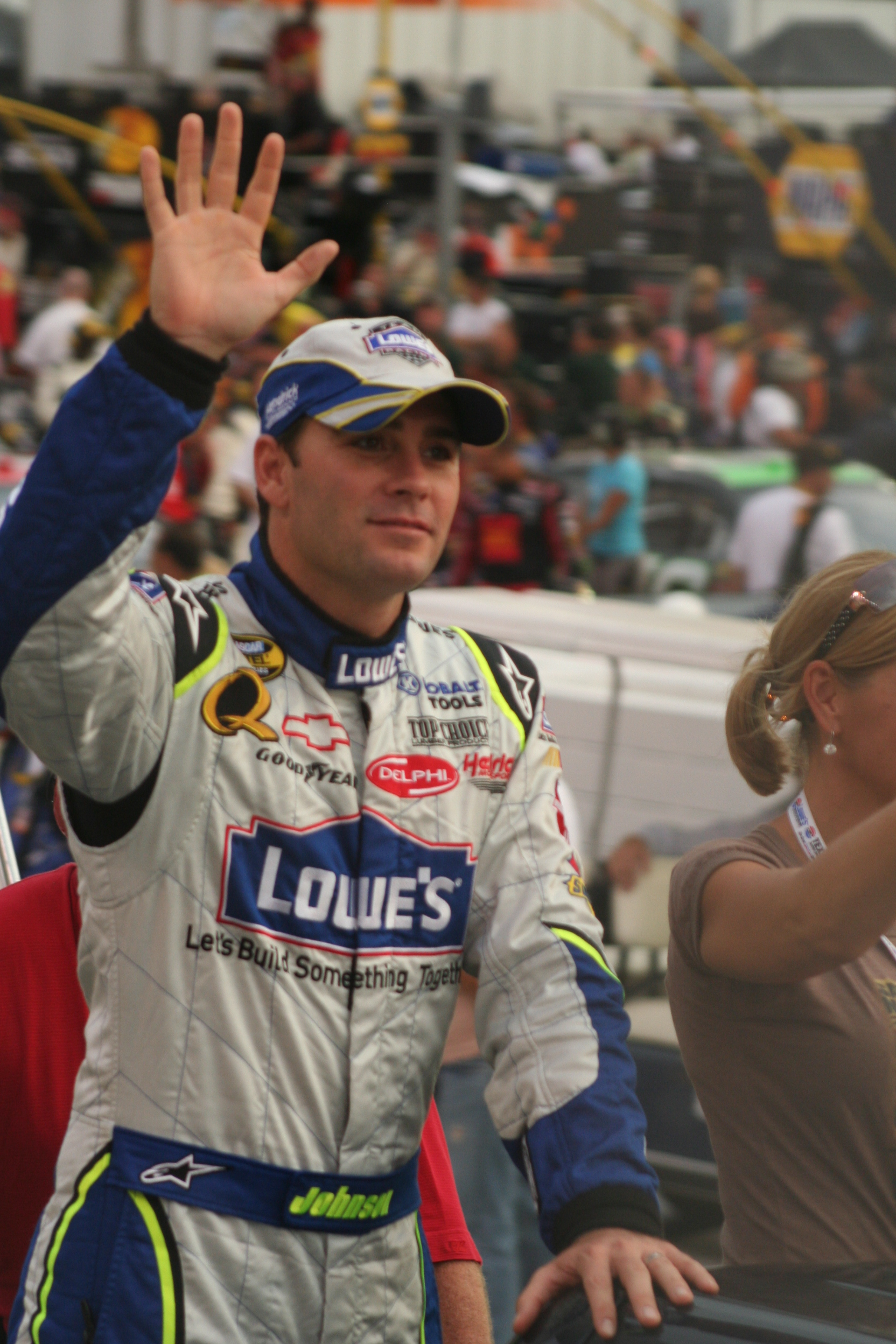
Jimmie Johnson, the 2009 Sprint Cup Series champion. This was the fourth of his five consecutive titles of seven overall.

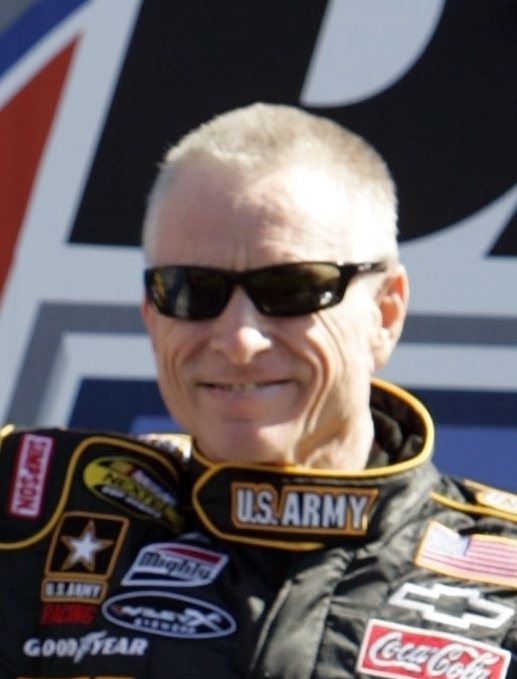
Mark Martin came in second behind Johnson by 141 points. It was his first full season since 2006.

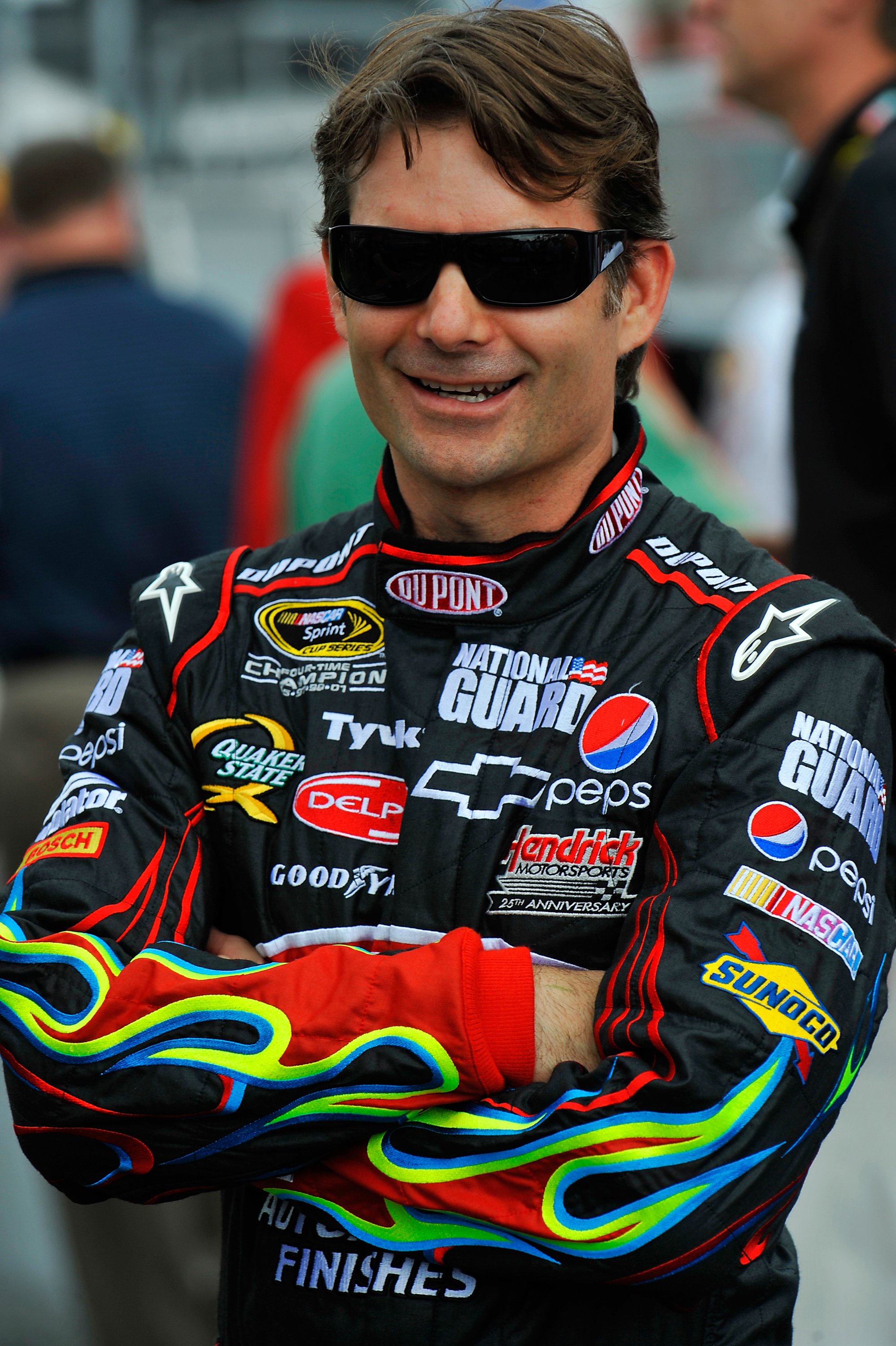
Jeff Gordon finished third in the championship in a 1-2-3 sweep for Hendrick Motorsports in the standings in 2009.

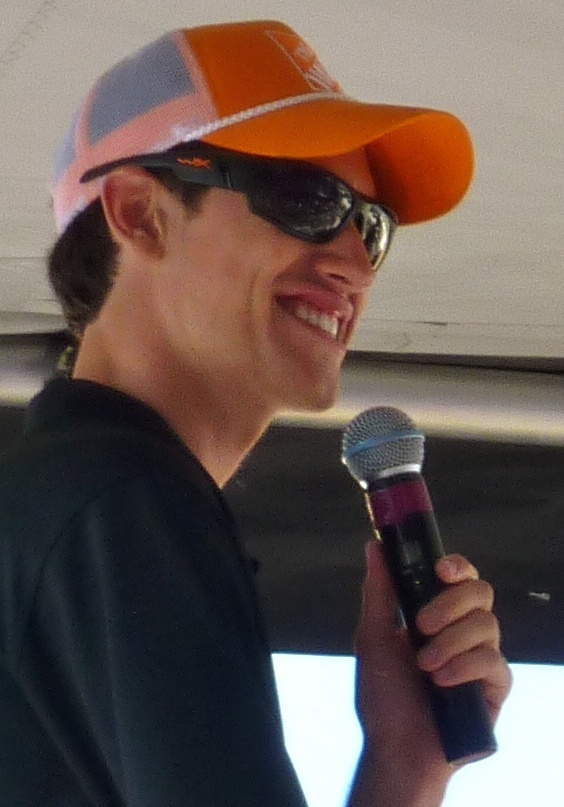
Joey Logano, the 2009 NASCAR Rookie of the Year.

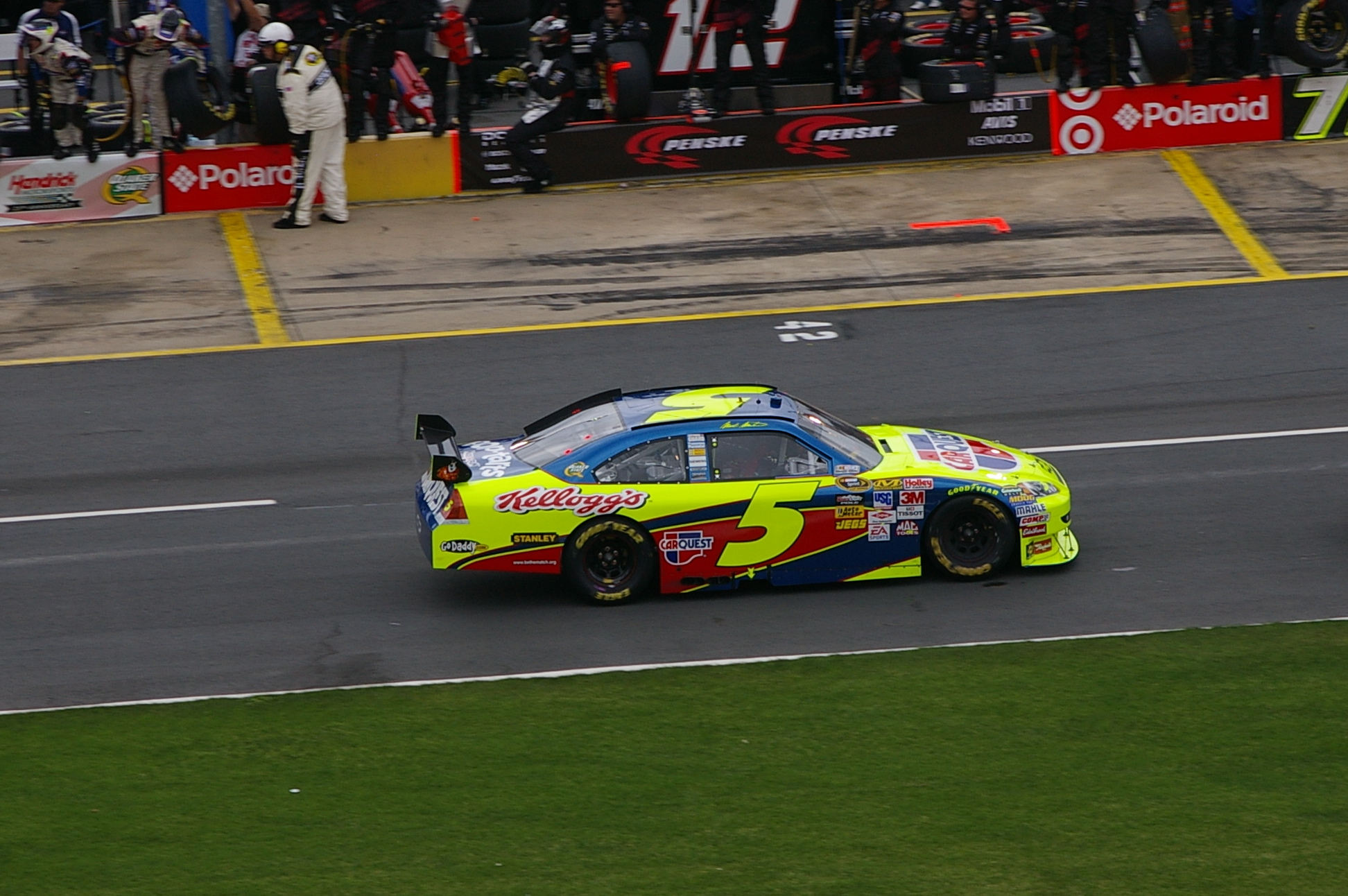
Chevrolet won the Manufacturer's championship with 18 wins & 248 points.

The 2009 NASCAR Sprint Cup Series was the 61st season of professional stock car racing in the United States, the 38th modern-era Cup series, and the last Cup season of the 21st century's first decade, the 2000s. The season included 36 races and two exhibition races with the regular season beginning with the Daytona 500 at Daytona International Speedway and ending with the Ford 400 at Homestead-Miami Speedway. The final ten races were known as 2009 Chase for the Sprint Cup. Rick Hendrick won the Owners' Championship, while Jimmie Johnson won the Drivers' Championship with a fifth-place finish at the final race of the season. Chevrolet won the Manufacturers' Championship with 248 points.

== Teams and drivers ==
=== Complete schedule ===
List of NASCAR Sprint Cup Series teams in 2009 (41 full-time teams).

Manufacturer	Team	No.	Race driver	Crew chief
Chevrolet	Earnhardt Ganassi Racing	1	Martin Truex Jr.	Kevin Manion
Chevrolet	Earnhardt Ganassi Racing	42	Juan Pablo Montoya	Brian Pattie
Chevrolet	Front Row Motorsports	34	John Andretti 34	Steve Lane
Chevrolet	Front Row Motorsports	34	Tony Raines 2	Steve Lane
Chevrolet	Hendrick Motorsports	5	Mark Martin	Alan Gustafson
Chevrolet	Hendrick Motorsports	24	Jeff Gordon	Steve Letarte
Chevrolet	Hendrick Motorsports	48	Jimmie Johnson	Chad Knaus
Chevrolet	Hendrick Motorsports	88	Dale Earnhardt Jr.	Tony Eury Jr.
Chevrolet	Richard Childress Racing	07	Casey Mears	Gil Martin
Chevrolet	Richard Childress Racing	29	Kevin Harvick	Todd Berrier
Chevrolet	Richard Childress Racing	31	Jeff Burton	Scott Miller
Chevrolet	Richard Childress Racing	33	Clint Bowyer	Shane Wilson
Chevrolet	Stewart–Haas Racing	14	Tony Stewart	Darian Grubb
Chevrolet	Stewart–Haas Racing	39	Ryan Newman	Tony Gibson
Chevrolet	TRG Motorsports	71	Mike Wallace 1	Slugger Labbe
Chevrolet	TRG Motorsports	71	David Gilliland 25	Slugger Labbe
Chevrolet	TRG Motorsports	71	Andy Lally 1	Slugger Labbe
Chevrolet	TRG Motorsports	71	Bobby Labonte 7	Slugger Labbe
Chevrolet	TRG Motorsports	71	Mike Bliss 2	Slugger Labbe
Chevrolet	Phoenix Racing	09	Brad Keselowski 6	Marc Reno
Chevrolet	Phoenix Racing	09	Ron Fellows 2	Marc Reno
Chevrolet	Phoenix Racing	09	David Gilliland 1	Marc Reno
Chevrolet	Phoenix Racing	09	David Stremme 1	Marc Reno
Dodge	Phoenix Racing	09	Sterling Marlin 12	Marc Reno
Dodge	Phoenix Racing	09	Mike Bliss 12	Marc Reno
Dodge	Phoenix Racing	09	Aric Almirola 2	Marc Reno
Dodge	Penske Championship Racing	2	Kurt Busch	Pat Tryson
Dodge	Penske Championship Racing	12	David Stremme 33	Roy McCauley
Dodge	Penske Championship Racing	12	Brad Keselowski 3	Roy McCauley
Dodge	Penske Championship Racing	77	Sam Hornish Jr.	Travis Geisler
Ford	Roush Fenway Racing	6	David Ragan	Jimmy Fennig
Ford	Roush Fenway Racing	16	Greg Biffle	Greg Erwin
Ford	Roush Fenway Racing	17	Matt Kenseth	Drew Blickensderfer
Ford	Roush Fenway Racing	26	Jamie McMurray	Donnie Wingo
Ford	Roush Fenway Racing	99	Carl Edwards	Bob Osbourne
Ford	Yates / Hall of Fame Racing	96	Bobby Labonte 29	Todd Parrott 10; Ben Leslie 26
Ford	Yates / Hall of Fame Racing	96	Erik Darnell 7	Todd Parrott 10; Ben Leslie 26
Ford	Yates / Hall of Fame Racing	98	Paul Menard	Larry Carter
Toyota	Joe Gibbs Racing	11	Denny Hamlin	Mike Ford
Toyota	Joe Gibbs Racing	18	Kyle Busch	Steve Addington
Toyota	Joe Gibbs Racing	20	Joey Logano (R)	Greg Zipadelli
Toyota	JTG Daugherty Racing	47	Marcos Ambrose	Frank Kerr
Toyota	Michael Waltrip Racing	00	David Reutimann	Rodney Childers
Toyota	Michael Waltrip Racing	55	Michael Waltrip 34	Bootie Barker; Gene Nead
Toyota	Michael Waltrip Racing	55	Patrick Carpentier 2	Bootie Barker; Gene Nead
Toyota	NEMCO Motorsports	87	Joe Nemechek 36	Phillipe Lopez
Toyota	NEMCO Motorsports	87	Scott Speed 2 (R) (Note: At Darlington (Race #11) and Sonoma (Race #16), Speed, who was scheduled to drive the No. 82 for Red Bull Racing Team failed to qualify his No. 82, so Nemechek who made the field, gave up his ride for Speed run both races, driving the No. 87 instead.)	Phillipe Lopez
Toyota	Prism Motorsports	66	Terry Labonte 1	Bill Henderson
Toyota	Prism Motorsports	66	Dave Blaney 34	Bill Henderson
Toyota	Prism Motorsports	66	Michael McDowell 1	Bill Henderson
Toyota	Red Bull Racing Team	82	Scott Speed (R)	Jimmy Elledge
Toyota	Red Bull Racing Team	83	Brian Vickers	Ryan Pemberton
Toyota	Robby Gordon Motorsports	7	Robby Gordon 35	Kirk Almquist
Toyota	Robby Gordon Motorsports	7	David Gilliland 1	Kirk Almquist
Toyota	Tommy Baldwin Racing	36	Scott Riggs 12	Tommy Baldwin Jr.
Toyota	Tommy Baldwin Racing	36	Mike Skinner 6	Tommy Baldwin Jr.
Toyota	Tommy Baldwin Racing	36	Patrick Carpentier 5	Tommy Baldwin Jr.
Toyota	Tommy Baldwin Racing	36	Brian Simo 2	Tommy Baldwin Jr.
Toyota	Tommy Baldwin Racing	36	Michael McDowell 10	Tommy Baldwin Jr.
Toyota	Tommy Baldwin Racing	36	Robert Richardson Jr. 1	Tommy Baldwin Jr.
Dodge Ford	Richard Petty Motorsports	9	Kasey Kahne	Kenny Francis
Dodge Ford	Richard Petty Motorsports	19	Elliott Sadler	Kevin Buskirk
Dodge Ford	Richard Petty Motorsports	43	Reed Sorenson	Mike Shiplett
Dodge Ford	Richard Petty Motorsports	44	A. J. Allmendinger	Sammy Johns

=== Limited schedule ===
Manufacturer	Team	No.	Race driver	Crew chief	Round(s)
Chevrolet	Furniture Row Racing	78	Regan Smith	Jay Guy	20
Chevrolet	Earnhardt Ganassi Racing	8	Aric Almirola	Doug Randolph	7
Chevrolet	TRG Motorsports	70	David Gilliland		1
Chevrolet	TRG Motorsports	70	Mike Skinner		2
Chevrolet	TRG Motorsports	70	Kevin Conway		1
Chevrolet	Hendrick Motorsports	25	Brad Keselowski	Lance McGrew	8
Chevrolet	Norm Benning Racing	57	Norm Benning	Mark Tutor	1
Chevrolet	Morgan-McClure Motorsports	4	Eric McClure		1
Chevrolet	Morgan-McClure Motorsports	4	Scott Wimmer		2
Chevrolet	R3 Motorsports	23	Mike Skinner		1
Dodge	Ash Motorsports	02	Brandon Ash	Kenneth Wood	3
Dodge	BlackJack Racing	51	Kelly Bires	Ryan Bergenty	1
Dodge	BlackJack Racing	51	David Starr	Ryan Bergenty	1
Dodge	BlackJack Racing	51	Dexter Bean (R)	Ryan Bergenty	6
Dodge	Boys Will Be; Boys Racing Co.	06	Trevor Boys	Iain Moncrieff	2
Dodge	Boys Will Be; Boys Racing Co.	06	David Starr	Iain Moncrieff	2
Dodge	Carl Long Racing	46	Carl Long		1
Dodge	Carl Long Racing	46	Dennis Setzer		1
Dodge	Cope/Keller Racing	75	Derrike Cope	Rich Markle	6
Dodge	H&S Motorsports	73	Mike Garvey	Buddy Sisco	4
Dodge	H&S Motorsports	73	Tony Raines	Buddy Sisco	1
Dodge	H&S Motorsports	73	Josh Wise	Buddy Sisco	1
Ford	Yates / Hall of Fame Racing	28	Travis Kvapil	Ben Leslie	5
Ford	Wood Brothers Racing	21	Bill Elliott	David Hyder	12
Ford	Wood Brothers Racing	21	David Gilliland	David Hyder	1
Ford	Carter/Simo Racing	08	Boris Said	Frank Stoddard	3
Toyota	Carter/Simo Racing	08	Terry Labonte	Tony Furr	5
Toyota	Joe Gibbs Racing	02	David Gilliland	Wally Brown	3
Toyota	Germain Racing	13	Max Papis (R)	Bootie Barker	21
Toyota	Germain Racing	35	Todd Bodine	Bootie Barker	1
Toyota	Gunselman Motorsports	64	Geoff Bodine	Doug Richert	2
Toyota	Gunselman Motorsports	64	Todd Bodine	Doug Richert	9
Toyota	Gunselman Motorsports	64	Mike Wallace	Doug Richert	8
Toyota	Gunselman Motorsports	64	Derrike Cope	Doug Richert	1
Toyota	Kirk Shelmerdine Racing	27	Kirk Shelmerdine		1
Toyota	Kirk Shelmerdine Racing	27	Tom Hubert		1
Toyota	Kirk Shelmerdine Racing	27	Ted Christopher		1
Toyota	Robby Gordon Motorsports	04	P. J. Jones	Bob Gordon	2
Toyota	Robby Gordon Motorsports	04	David Gilliland	Bob Gordon	1
Toyota	Mayfield Motorsports	41	Jeremy Mayfield	Tony Furr	11
Toyota	Mayfield Motorsports	41	J. J. Yeley	Tony Furr	1
Chevrolet Dodge	Front Row Motorsports	37	Tony Raines	Scott Eggleston	21
Chevrolet Dodge	Front Row Motorsports	37	Chris Cook		1
Chevrolet Dodge	Front Row Motorsports	37	Tony Ave		1
Chevrolet Dodge	Front Row Motorsports	37	Kevin Hamlin	Peter Sospenzo	1
Chevrolet Dodge	Front Row Motorsports	37	Travis Kvapil	Peter Sospenzo	3

=== Changes ===
- Because of the merger of Dale Earnhardt, Inc. with Chip Ganassi Racing, the No. 01 and No. 15 teams closed after the 2008 season. However, the owners' points from the No. 15 were transferred to the No. 34, while points from either the No. 01 or No. 41 was transferred to the No. 07, with the No. 33 car, owned by Richard Childress, receiving the other. (NASCAR allows for a transfer if the original owner maintains some stake in the team to which points are transferred.)
- 2009 also saw the demise of Petty Enterprises, which merged with Gillett Evernham Motorsports. The new company would be called Richard Petty Motorsports, forming a 4 car team with Kasey Kahne in the No. 9, Elliott Sadler in the No. 19, Reed Sorenson driving the famed No. 43, and A. J. Allmendinger driving the No. 44.
- The operations of Bill Davis Racing were bought by Triad Racing Technologies which originally planned to continue to field the team full-time, however the No. 22 team was bought by Penske Racing with Bill Davis holding minority interest. The No. 22's points were transferred to the No. 77, thus guaranteeing that car a spot in the Daytona 500 should all other transfers occur.

== Major news stories ==
=== Economic effects ===
==== Mergers, contractions, and alliances ====
The 2008 financial crisis caused problems even before the 2009 season began. While gas (and diesel) prices came down to nearly $2.00 per gallon, corporate America was reluctant to shell out millions of dollars to sponsor teams due to the volatility of the stock market. As a result, Chip Ganassi Racing merged with Dale Earnhardt, Inc. to form Earnhardt Ganassi Racing with Felix Sabates. They fielded the No. 1 and No. 8 from DEI and No. 42 from Ganassi, and shut down the DEI No. 01 and No. 15 teams as well as Ganassi's No. 40 and No. 41 teams, as the No. 40 was a full-time team in 2008 until July, when it was closed for a lack of sponsorship. The No. 42 team will run under the Chevrolet banner under the merger as it changes from Dodge. In addition, Front Row Motorsports has EGR support for their No. 34 car, to be driven by John Andretti. On January 19, Petty Enterprises merged with Gillett Evernham Motorsports for the merger with Petty's famous No. 43 joining the newly renamed Richard Petty Motorsports. On December 22, 2008, Bill Davis Racing was sold to California businessman Mike Held and BDR vice president Marty Gaunt, and was renamed Triad Racing Development. Hall of Fame Racing announced an alliance with Yates Racing on January 13, 2009, and named Bobby Labonte as the new driver of the No. 96 team as they move from Toyota to Ford. The first in-season casualty was the No. 28 team of Travis Kvapil owned by Yates Racing, ceasing operations following the Food City 500 on March 22. On April 7, the second casualty of the season was the famous No. 8, which folded because of a lack of sponsorship, leaving Aric Almirola without a ride. On September 10, it was announced that Yates Racing and RPM would merge, closing the No. 44 and No. 96 teams as a result for the 2010 season and the No. 9, No. 19 and No. 43 teams will switch to Ford.

=== The elimination of testing ===
On November 14, 2008, NASCAR announced, as another cost-cutting measure, that teams will no longer be allowed to test on NASCAR-sanctioned tracks in all three major series. Traditionally, they had had preseason tests at Daytona and Las Vegas, along with as many as four additional in-season sessions at tracks, but all teams also use unsanctioned tracks (such as Rockingham Speedway) for their tests. The testing ban covers all tracks used on NASCAR's three national series, plus tracks that host events in the Camping World East and West circuits. This radically reduces the number of tracks that can be used for testing, with Rockingham being one of the few major tracks still available. This meant that the annual "Pre-Season Thunder" testing events, which covered all three major touring series at Daytona was cancelled for 2009. However, a fan fest remained in place with the thunder provided by the Richard Petty Driving Experience for fans to ride in a special two-seat stock car. However, Goodyear will still conduct tire tests, such as at Indianapolis Motor Speedway. A total of seven tests were conducted at Indianapolis following the 2008 Allstate 400 at the Brickyard tire debacle.

==== Reduction in manufacturer support ====
Following General Motors' bankruptcy, GM cut all financial support in the Nationwide and Camping World Truck Series, and considerably reduced financial support in the Sprint Cup Series. Similarly, the Chrysler bankruptcy led to several Dodge Sprint Cup teams, including Richard Petty Motorsports, losing their manufacturer support; as stated earlier, RPM will merge with Yates and have the No. 9, No. 19 and No. 43 cars switch to Ford for the 2010 season. Dodge claims that "funding is on hold." Toyota gave a small reduction in funding before the season, but has not made any mid-season cuts. Rumors have floated that Toyota may leave the Camping World Truck Series or Nationwide Series; the automaker has denied these reports. Ford, the healthiest of all the automakers, continues funding at pre-crisis levels. From the 2005 season it has been rumored that Honda will join the Nationwide and Sprint Cup series, and the rumor gets stronger entering the 2009 season, as Dodge claimed its funding on hold. This was denied by the manufacturer.

=== Town-hall meeting ===
On Tuesday, May 26, 2009, NASCAR held a town-hall meeting closed to the public and media with its drivers and owners to discuss a range of topics. Major topics discussed included the Jeremy Mayfield substance abuse suspension controversy, along with double-file restarts, the controversial Car of Tomorrow, sponsorship, testing, the reduction in TV ratings and attendance, and competition in general. All attendees considered the meeting a success.

=== Double-file restarts ===
Before the start of the season, NASCAR changed restart rules regarding the final moments of all races in the Sprint Cup, Nationwide Series and Camping World Truck Series. Previously, when the race was inside the final ten laps, all cars/trucks on the lead lap were in a single-file restart in that window. As of the 2009 season, the window changed to the final 20 laps. The "lucky dog"/"free pass" rule will still be eliminated in the last ten laps of a race.

However, before the June Pocono race, the entire restart procedure changed entirely in the NASCAR Sprint Cup Series. After being run successfully at the NASCAR Sprint Cup All-Star Race and in the Budweiser Shootout, NASCAR implemented a double-file restart system starting at Pocono for the NASCAR Sprint Cup Series. This change came at the request of fans, drivers, owners, and the media and as a result in a decrease in TV ratings during the NASCAR on Fox portion of the season. (The June Pocono race was the first race of the 2009 season on TNT.) The entire field will line up double-file, much like the start of the race at every restart. The leaders and other lead lap cars are now in front always when taking the green flag. Cars who choose to stay out and not pit during a caution flag who are in front of the leaders are now waved-around to restart (double file) at the back of the field. The lucky dog/free pass rule is now in effect the entire distance of the race, and the double-file restarts are for every restart, including green-white-checkered finishes. The only reasons cars do not line up double-file in the order they are position wise on the leaderboard is if they are serving a penalty (in most cases, for pit road violations). The leader of the race also has the option of selecting which lane, inside or outside, to restart in, however, the 3rd place car (and 5th, 7th, and so on) will always restart on the inside.

The new restart procedure began in the NASCAR Nationwide Series on July 3 at Daytona. NASCAR said it will not be it in the NASCAR Camping World Truck Series until at least 2010.

=== Jeremy Mayfield substance abuse controversy ===
==== Suspension ====
Two hours prior to the race at Darlington, NASCAR announced that driver Jeremy Mayfield has been suspended for a substance abuse policy violation. Mayfield said that the positive test was due to an interaction between a prescription drug and an over-the-counter drug. Mayfield had failed to qualify for the race.

Mayfield violated his suspension by being at Lowe's Motor Speedway for a press conference during the all-star race weekend.

The suspension is indefinite until Mayfield completes NASCAR's substance abuse program, which includes rehabilitation and additional testing.

==== Controversy ====
In the ensuing days and weeks following the initial suspension, NASCAR was widely criticized by fans, drivers, owners, the media, and the World Anti-Doping Agency for not publicly identifying the drug found in Mayfield's test and failing to publish its drug policy or a list of banned substances. NASCAR's drug policy was later published and reports and court filings (see below) indicate that the test was positive for amphetamines. Despite releasing this information, NASCAR has still not published a definitive list of banned substances, leading to continued criticism. However, NASCAR addressed the issue in its May meeting with the NASCAR owners and drivers, who now say they understand why NASCAR doesn't publish a list. Nonetheless, some remained skeptical of NASCAR's intentions, claiming that "if NASCAR sees something they don't like, they can suspend anyone at anytime." In the middle of the controversy, NASCAR randomly tested 10 NASCAR drivers, officials, and crew members during a rain delay at the Coca-Cola 600 during Memorial Day weekend.

ESPN reported on June 9 that Mayfield tested positive for methamphetamines. This was later confirmed in court.

==== Lawsuit ====
Mayfield sued NASCAR to have his suspension lifted. Mayfield says that he had taken Claritin-D, an allergy drug, in addition to Adderall, a prescription medication used to treat attention deficit disorder. Adderall is an amphetamine.

An initial court hearing for a restraining order that would have allowed Mayfield to compete at Dover was ruled in NASCAR's favor. Mayfield's team, which has been taken over by his wife and driver J. J. Yeley, withdrew from the race at Dover. Mayfield sold his team in late July to raise funds for his legal defense. NASCAR has said that Mayfield's team may continue to compete with a different driver and under a different owner. Since Mayfield is suspended, he cannot be in the NASCAR garage area or anywhere where a NASCAR license is required.

NASCAR has successfully moved the case to federal court. NASCAR has also countersued Mayfield, accusing the suspended driver of willfully violating the substance abuse policy, breach of contract, and defrauding competitors of earnings. Mayfield earned approximately $150,000 from May 1 in NASCAR earnings. May 1 is when Mayfield claims he began taking the Claritin-D. On June 25, Mayfield formally denied ever taking methamphetamines in a pre-hearing affidavit filed in U.S. District Court, while NASCAR said that the test results proved he was a chronic user of meth and was a danger to public safety.

On July 1, U.S. District Court granted Mayfield a temporary injunction that lifted Mayfield's suspension and allowed him to resume his role as driver and owner. The court ruled the damage to Mayfield and was far exceeding the damage to NASCAR, and that there was a high probability that the second test sample was compromised. Mayfield did not return to the track, as his race team was low on funds and sponsors did not want to associate with Mayfield. He sold his team in late July.

On July 7, NASCAR appealed the U.S. District Court's ruling. On July 8, NASCAR formally filed an appeal with the U.S. Circuit Court of Appeals, one step away from the United States Supreme Court. NASCAR claimed that the district court's ruling undermines NASCAR's ability to police drug use and is asking that Mayfield may be re-suspended. The 4th Circuit Court of Appeals granted NASCAR a motion to re-suspend Mayfield on July 24 following a second drug test. NASCAR re-suspended Mayfield immediately.

==== Second drug test ====
On July 7, Mayfield submitted to a drug test. NASCAR said Mayfield was notified by an Aegis representative at 1:18 pm Monday to report to a nearby testing center within two hours, but the driver said he had to first speak to his attorney. After a delay, Mayfield's attorney told NASCAR that Mayfield couldn't get to the center by 3:18 pm, so NASCAR said it found a lab closer to his location. At 3:45 pm, Mayfield called the lab to say he was close but lost, and a receptionist offered to talk him the rest of the way. NASCAR said Mayfield told the lab he would call right back but no one was contacted until 5:30 pm, when Mayfield's attorney called NASCAR to inform them Mayfield could not find the location so the lawyer had sent him to an independent laboratory. Two testers and a NASCAR security officer arrived at Mayfield's home in Catawba County, N.C., at 7:20 pm, could not gain access for 10 minutes, and then weren't able to persuade Mayfield to give a sample until 8:20 pm. NASCAR called this seven-hour layover between the time requested for a test and the time a test was given a "classic delay tactic".

On July 15, NASCAR filed documents in U.S. District Court that indicated that Mayfield had once again tested positive for methamphetamines. In addition to the second test results, NASCAR also submitted an affidavit from Mayfield's stepmother in which she says that Mayfield used meth over 30 times in 7 years through snorting it up his nose. Mayfield says that "Brian France talking about effective drug programs is like having Al Capone talking about effective law enforcement," and that "I don't trust anything NASCAR does, anything (program administrator) Dr. David Black does, never have, never will." As for his stepmother, Mayfield says that "She's basically a whore. She shot and killed my dad." Lisa Mayfield (Jeremy's stepmother) has since filed a lawsuit suing Mayfield for $20,000 in damages. Mayfield says that he has been tested almost daily by an independent lab and every test result has come back negative.

Mayfield Motorsports' general manager resigned the same day, hours before the test results were released. The team has since been sold, and a few expect Mayfield to return to the track soon, if ever again.

==== Effect on drug testing ====
Many drivers have said that since the controversy began, the drug testing time has gone from a quick 5-minute in and out to a prolonged 45-minute process that includes identity verification.

== Schedule ==
The most significant schedule changes in the 2009 NASCAR schedule realignment included the addition of the Pepsi 500 at Auto Club Speedway to the 2009 Chase, the shifting of the AMP Energy 500 at Talladega Superspeedway to a later autumn date, and the placement of the Pep Boys Auto 500 at Atlanta Motor Speedway to Labor Day weekend as a night race. Additionally, there was a fourth off-week between the Sharpie 500 at Bristol Motor Speedway and the Pep Boys 500. The schedule changes are listed in boldface on the chart below.

No.	Race title	Track	Date
	Budweiser Shootout	Daytona International Speedway, Daytona Beach	February 7
	Gatorade Duels	Daytona International Speedway, Daytona Beach	February 12
1	Daytona 500	Daytona International Speedway, Daytona Beach	February 15
2	Auto Club 500	Auto Club Speedway, Fontana	February 22
3	Shelby 427	Las Vegas Motor Speedway, Las Vegas	March 1
4	Kobalt Tools 500	Atlanta Motor Speedway, Hampton	March 8
5	Food City 500	Bristol Motor Speedway, Bristol	March 22
6	Goody's Fast Pain Relief 500	Martinsville Speedway, Ridgeway	March 29
7	Samsung 500	Texas Motor Speedway, Fort Worth	April 5
8	Subway Fresh Fit 500	Phoenix International Raceway, Avondale	April 18
9	Aaron's 499	Talladega Superspeedway, Lincoln	April 26
10	Crown Royal presents the Russell Friedman 400	Richmond International Raceway, Richmond	May 2
11	Southern 500 presented by GoDaddy.com	Darlington Raceway, Darlington	May 9
	NASCAR All-Star Race XXV	Lowe's Motor Speedway, Concord	May 16
	Sprint Showdown	Lowe's Motor Speedway, Concord	May 16
12	Coca-Cola 600	Lowe's Motor Speedway, Concord	May 25
13	Autism Speaks 400 presented by Heluva Good! Cheese	Dover International Speedway, Dover	May 31
14	Pocono 500	Pocono Raceway, Long Pond	June 7
15	Lifelock 400	Michigan International Speedway, Brooklyn	June 14
16	Toyota/Save Mart 350	Infineon Raceway, Sonoma	June 21
17	Lenox Industrial Tools 301	New Hampshire Motor Speedway, Loudon	June 28
18	Coke Zero 400	Daytona International Speedway, Daytona Beach	July 4
19	LifeLock.com 400	Chicagoland Speedway, Joliet	July 11
20	Allstate 400 at the Brickyard	Indianapolis Motor Speedway, Speedway	July 26
21	Sunoco American Red Cross Pennsylvania 500	Pocono Raceway, Long Pond	August 3
22	Heluva Good! Sour Cream Dips at The Glen	Watkins Glen International, Watkins Glen	August 10
23	Carfax 400	Michigan International Speedway, Brooklyn	August 16
24	Sharpie 500	Bristol Motor Speedway, Bristol	August 22
25	Pep Boys Auto 500	Atlanta Motor Speedway, Hampton	September 6
26	Chevy Rock & Roll 400	Richmond International Raceway, Richmond	September 12
Chase for the Sprint Cup
27	Sylvania 300	New Hampshire Motor Speedway, Loudon	September 20
28	AAA 400	Dover International Speedway, Dover	September 27
29	Price Chopper 400	Kansas Speedway, Kansas City	October 4
30	Pepsi 500	Auto Club Speedway, Fontana	October 11
31	NASCAR Banking 500 only from Bank of America	Lowe's Motor Speedway, Concord	October 17
32	TUMS Fast Relief 500	Martinsville Speedway, Ridgeway	October 25
33	AMP Energy 500	Talladega Superspeedway, Lincoln	November 1
34	Dickies 500	Texas Motor Speedway, Fort Worth	November 8
35	Checker O'Reilly Auto Parts 500	Phoenix International Raceway, Avondale	November 15
36	Ford 400	Homestead-Miami Speedway, Homestead	November 22
Coca-Cola 600, Sunoco American Red Cross Pennsylvania 500, and Heluva Good! Sour Cream Dips at The Glen were scheduled to have been run on Sunday, but were rescheduled to Monday due to rain.

== Television and radio ==
=== United States ===
In their third year of the current NASCAR television agreement, Fox carried the Bud Shootout, the Daytona 500 and the first 13 races through Dover's June race. Fox-owned Speed Channel aired the Gatorade Duels and Sprint All Star Race XXV. TNT then picked up the next six races starting at Pocono including the summer race at Daytona, the Coke Zero 400 with its "wide open format" coverage and ending at Chicago. The Allstate 400 at the Brickyard started ESPN/ABC's coverage, including the entire Chase for the Sprint Cup on ABC.

New to Fox telecasts was 3-D CGI animated adventures of "Digger", the network's gopher cam mascot and his friends, Annie, Marbles, Grandpa and rival Lumpy Wheels (named after former Lowe's Motor Speedway chief Humpy Wheeler). According to Digger's backstory, created by Fox Sports chairman David Hill, Digger lives underground at Talladega Superspeedway. The characters were also used in segues into and out of commercial breaks. However, Digger later became a harbor of criticism, as well as what most have cited as a cause of a deeper ratings decline than in years past, adding to already lower-than-normal ratings. More is mentioned here.

Hours before the July New Hampshire race on TNT, Bill Weber was removed from the broadcast booth and replaced by Ralph Sheheen for undisclosed personal reasons. TNT and NASCAR announced on July 1 that Sheheen would replace Weber for the final two races on TNT at Daytona and Chicagoland.

The annual changes at ABC/ESPN continue. Mike Massaro became a third host of NASCAR Now on ESPN2; Vince Welch replaced Massaro on pit road and Marty Reid is doing selected Nationwide Series events as well. But ESPN continues to face heavy criticism from NASCAR fans in result of bored announcers, bad camera work, excessive commercials and lack of post-race coverage.

On radio, Sirius XM Radio will carry all races in the series. Terrestrial radio rights are being handled as follows:

- Motor Racing Network will carry races at tracks owned by their corporate sibling, International Speedway Corporation as well as the races at Dover and Pocono and the All-Star Race at Lowe's;
- Speedway Motorsports, Inc.-owned Performance Racing Network will carry events from those SMI tracks, and will jointly produce the Allstate 400 at the Brickyard with the Indianapolis Motor Speedway Radio Network.

Speed (replacing ESPN Classic) and MRN will be the broadcasters at the annual Sprint Cup Banquet at the Wynn Las Vegas Hotel Casino in said city on December 4. Las Vegas replaces New York City as the host after 27 years there, 26 of the banquets being staged in The Waldorf=Astoria Hotel.

=== Other North American channels ===
In Canada, TSN and TSN 2 covered the 2009 season.

=== International ===
In Australia, Fox Sports showed all of the Sprint Cup races live across their networks. Network Ten also showed Qualifying, Final Practice (Happy Hour), a 1-hour highlights package and selected races live on its new digital sports multichannel, ONE.

In Portugal, all races this season were telecast on SportTv 3, while in Sweden, Viasat Motor televised the races. In nearby Finland, Urheilu+Kanava telecasted the season's events, and in Great Britain and Ireland, the whole season was again telecasted on Sky Sports, in Spain Teledeporte televised six races of the season live.

In Latin America all the races were broadcast on Speed Latin America. They did not telecast practices or qualifying.

== 2009 season races ==
=== Regular season ===
==== Budweiser Shootout ====
The Budweiser Shootout exhibition race was held on February 7 at Daytona International Speedway. Paul Menard drew the pole. This was the first Shootout where the entry list is not made up of pole winners from the previous season. For the 2009 running, the field was made up of the top six teams from each competing manufacturer based on 2008 owner's points, plus a wild card entry from each manufacturer.

Top 10 results

1. #29 – Kevin Harvick
2. #26 – Jamie McMurray
3. #14 – Tony Stewart
4. #24 – Jeff Gordon
5. #44 – A. J. Allmendinger
6. #9 – Kasey Kahne
7. #99 – Carl Edwards
8. #17 – Matt Kenseth
9. #2 – Kurt Busch
10. #18 – Kyle Busch

==== Gatorade Duels ====
The Gatorade Duels, held on February 12, are a pair of qualifying races to set the field for the Daytona 500.

Race 1 results

1. #24 – Jeff Gordon
2. #14 – Tony Stewart
3. #48 – Jimmie Johnson
4. #20 – Joey Logano
5. #8 – Aric Almirola
6. #2 – Kurt Busch
7. #9 – Kasey Kahne
8. #36 – Scott Riggs
9. #98 – Paul Menard
10. #26 – Jamie McMurray

Race 2 results

1. #18 – Kyle Busch
2. #5 – Mark Martin
3. #83 – Brian Vickers
4. #42 – Juan Pablo Montoya
5. #11 – Denny Hamlin
6. #96 – Bobby Labonte
7. #88 – Dale Earnhardt Jr.
8. #99 – Carl Edwards
9. #41 – Jeremy Mayfield
10. #44 – A. J. Allmendinger

==== 2009 Daytona 500 ====
The 2009 Daytona 500 was held on February 15. Martin Truex Jr. qualified on the pole. On lap 152, the race was halted because of rain and when NASCAR determined they could not get the race restarted, the race was called official.

Top 10 results

1. #17 – Matt Kenseth
2. #29 – Kevin Harvick
3. #44 – A. J. Allmendinger
4. #33 – Clint Bowyer
5. #19 – Elliott Sadler
6. #6 – David Ragan
7. #55 – Michael Waltrip
8. #14 – Tony Stewart
9. #43 – Reed Sorenson
10. #2 – Kurt Busch

Failed to qualify: #87 – Joe Nemechek, #08 – Boris Said, #09 – Brad Keselowski, #27 – Kirk Shelmerdine, #71 – Mike Wallace, #37 – Tony Raines, #73 – Mike Garvey, #75 – Derrike Cope, #23 – Mike Skinner, #51 – Kelly Bires, #46 – Carl Long, #64 – Geoff Bodine, #57 – Norm Benning, #60 – James Hylton (withdrew)

==== Auto Club 500 ====
The Auto Club 500 was run on February 22 at Auto Club Speedway. Brian Vickers won the pole for this race, but had to start in the back of the field due to an engine change.

Top 10 results

1. #17 – Matt Kenseth*
2. #24 – Jeff Gordon
3. #18 – Kyle Busch
4. #16 – Greg Biffle
5. #2 – Kurt Busch
6. #11 – Denny Hamlin
7. #99 – Carl Edwards
8. #14 – Tony Stewart
9. #48 – Jimmie Johnson
10. #83 – Brian Vickers

Failed to qualify: #64 – Todd Bodine, #37 – Tony Raines, #51 – David Starr, #73 – Mike Garvey, #09 – Sterling Marlin

- By winning this race, Matt Kenseth became the first driver since Jeff Gordon in 1997 to start off a Cup season by winning the first two races of the year, and the last driver to put it off until Tyler Reddick in 2026.
- Despite the caution flag coming out for rain on 4 occasions, NASCAR was still able to complete this race in its entirety.

==== Shelby 427 ====
The Shelby 427 was run at Las Vegas Motor Speedway on March 1. Normally this race is 267 laps and 400 miles long, but for this year's running, Carroll Shelby International took over the title sponsorship of the race and decided to run the race 27 miles longer in honor of the Shelby 427 sports car. Kyle Busch qualified on the pole for the race, but had to start in the back due to an engine change. Busch would rally in the last part of the race to win from the pole.

Top 10 results

1. #18 – Kyle Busch
2. #33 – Clint Bowyer
3. #31 – Jeff Burton
4. #00 – David Reutimann
5. #96 – Bobby Labonte
6. #24 – Jeff Gordon
7. #16 – Greg Biffle
8. #83 – Brian Vickers
9. #26 – Jamie McMurray
10. #88 – Dale Earnhardt Jr.

Failed to qualify: #28 – Travis Kvapil, #66 – Dave Blaney, #73 – Mike Garvey, #41 – Jeremy Mayfield, #09 – Sterling Marlin, #36 – Scott Riggs, #37 – Tony Raines, #51 – Dexter Bean

==== Kobalt Tools 500 ====
The Kobalt Tools 500 was held on March 8 at Atlanta Motor Speedway. Mark Martin won the pole. Kurt Busch started on the outside front row from second place and would go on to lead 234 laps on his way to a dominating win. This race was extended from 325 to 330 laps due to a green-white-checkered finish.

Top 10 results

1. #2 – Kurt Busch
2. #24 – Jeff Gordon
3. #99 – Carl Edwards
4. #29 – Kevin Harvick
5. #83 – Brian Vickers
6. #33 – Clint Bowyer
7. #9 – Kasey Kahne
8. #14 – Tony Stewart
9. #48 – Jimmie Johnson
10. #1 – Martin Truex Jr.

Failed to qualify: #35 – Todd Bodine, #36 – Scott Riggs, #41 – Jeremy Mayfield, #64 – Geoff Bodine, #37 – Tony Raines

==== Food City 500 ====
The Food City 500 was held on March 22 at Bristol Motor Speedway. Mark Martin started on the pole. One week after Kurt Busch dominated at Atlanta, his brother Kyle Busch would dominate this race, leading 378 of 503 laps despite starting mid pack in 19th place. This race was extended to 503 laps from its scheduled 500 due to a green-white-checkered finish.

Top 10 results

1. #18 – Kyle Busch
2. #11 – Denny Hamlin
3. #48 – Jimmie Johnson
4. #24 – Jeff Gordon
5. #9 – Kasey Kahne
6. #5 – Mark Martin
7. #39 – Ryan Newman
8. #31 – Jeff Burton
9. #42 – Juan Pablo Montoya
10. #47 – Marcos Ambrose

Failed to qualify: #36 – Scott Riggs, #41 – Jeremy Mayfield

==== Goody's Fast Pain Relief 500 ====
The Goody's Fast Pain Relief 500 was held at Martinsville Speedway on March 29. Qualifying was rained out and points were used to set the field. Jeff Gordon would be given the pole starting spot as a result.

Top 10 results

1. 48 – Jimmie Johnson*
2. 11 – Denny Hamlin*
3. 14 – Tony Stewart
4. 24 – Jeff Gordon
5. 33 – Clint Bowyer
6. 39 – Ryan Newman
7. 5 – Mark Martin
8. 88 – Dale Earnhardt Jr.
9. 44 – A. J. Allmendinger
10. 26 – Jamie McMurray

Failed to qualify: #09 – Sterling Marlin, #37 – Tony Raines, #46 – Dennis Setzer, #75 – Derrike Cope, #73 – Mike Garvey (withdrew)

- Denny Hamlin led the bulk of the laps, leading 296 of 500.
- Johnson's victory was an emotional one for team owner Rick Hendrick, as this was the 25th anniversary of Hendrick Motorsports's first Cup Series victory, in this same race in 1984.

==== Samsung 500 ====
The Samsung 500 was held on Sunday April 5, at Texas Motor Speedway. David Reutimann won the pole. Jeff Gordon would hold on from a hard charging Jimmie Johnson who was cutting into Gordon's lead and take the victory. This was Jeff Gordon's first career victory at Texas.

Top 10 results

1. #24 – Jeff Gordon
2. #48 – Jimmie Johnson
3. #16 – Greg Biffle
4. #14 – Tony Stewart
5. #17 – Matt Kenseth
6. #5 – Mark Martin
7. #42 – Juan Pablo Montoya
8. #2 – Kurt Busch
9. #31 – Jeff Burton
10. #99 – Carl Edwards

Failed to qualify: #87 – Joe Nemechek, #82 – Scott Speed, #41 – Jeremy Mayfield, #64 – Todd Bodine, #36 – Scott Riggs

- Aric Almirola finished six laps down in 33rd, in what would be the last race for the DEI #8 team before shutting down due to lack of sponsorship.

==== Subway Fresh Fit 500 ====
The Subway Fresh Fit 500 was run on Saturday, April 18, at Phoenix International Raceway. Mark Martin started on the pole.

Top 10 results

1. #5 – Mark Martin*
2. #14 – Tony Stewart
3. #2 – Kurt Busch
4. #48 – Jimmie Johnson
5. #16 – Greg Biffle
6. #11 – Denny Hamlin
7. #1 – Martin Truex Jr.
8. #00 – David Reutimann
9. #77 – Sam Hornish Jr.
10. #99 – Carl Edwards

Failed to qualify: #64 – Todd Bodine, #41 – Jeremy Mayfield, #51 – Dexter Bean, #02 – Brandon Ash, #06 – Trevor Boys

- By winning this race, Mark Martin became the fourth driver in Cup Series history to win a points race over the age of 50. Martin led 157 of 312 laps.
- Martin's victory also ended a 97-race winless streak, dating back to September 2005.

==== Aaron's 499 ====
The Aaron's 499 was run on Sunday, April 26, at Talladega Superspeedway. Juan Pablo Montoya won the pole. This race is forever remembered for the final lap. The tandem duo of Ryan Newman and Dale Earnhardt Jr. were running first and second coming to the white flag when another tandem duo of Carl Edwards and Nationwide Series regular Brad Keselowski drafted and blew right by Newman and Earnhardt Jr., breaking away down the back straightaway to settle the race among themselves. Coming into the tri oval, Brad Keselowski started to peak outside, causing Edwards to react high when Keselowski quickly turned back into the inside finding some room and some momentum to start making a pass down to the inside. Edwards tried to block Keselowski but when Brad's front end made contact with Carl's back end, it turned Carl Edwards' car sideways, causing the back end of his car to lift before being slammed into from the oncoming car of Ryan Newman. The impact sent Carl Edwards' car crashing up into the catch fence that separates the fans from the action. Brad Keselowski took the checkered flag to win his first career Sprint Cup Series race in just his 5th start.

Top 10 results

1. #09 – Brad Keselowski*
2. #88 – Dale Earnhardt Jr.
3. #39 – Ryan Newman
4. #47 – Marcos Ambrose
5. #82 – Scott Speed
6. #2 – Kurt Busch
7. #16 – Greg Biffle
8. #83 – Brian Vickers
9. #20 – Joey Logano
10. #31 – Jeff Burton

Failed to qualify: #66 – Michael McDowell, #4 – Eric McClure, #64 – Geoff Bodine

- Not only was this Brad Keselowski's first career win in the Sprint Cup Series, it was also the first and only career Cup Series victory for Phoenix Racing and team owner James Finch.
- After Carl Edwards' car came to a stop from his last lap crash just short of the finish line, Edwards got out of his car and physically ran from the wreckage to across the finish line, paying homage to the movie Talladega Nights: The Ballad of Ricky Bobby. Edwards was officially credited with a 24th-place finish, completing 187 of 188 laps.

==== Crown Royal presents the Russ Friedman 400 ====
The Crown Royal presents the Russ Friedman 400 was held on Saturday, May 2 at Richmond International Raceway. Brian Vickers won the pole.

Top 10 results

1. #18 – Kyle Busch*
2. #14 – Tony Stewart
3. #31 – Jeff Burton
4. #39 – Ryan Newman
5. #5 – Mark Martin
6. #77 – Sam Hornish Jr.
7. #26 – Jamie McMurray
8. #24 – Jeff Gordon
9. #07 – Casey Mears
10. #42 – Juan Pablo Montoya

Failed to qualify: #64 – Todd Bodine, #06 – Trevor Boys

- Busch's victory came on his 24th birthday, becoming the first driver since Cale Yarborough in 1977 to win a Cup race on his date of birth.

==== Southern 500 presented by GoDaddy.Com ====
The Southern 500 presented by GoDaddy.com was held at Darlington Raceway on Saturday, May 9. Matt Kenseth won the pole.

Top 10 results

1. #5 – Mark Martin
2. #48 – Jimmie Johnson
3. #14 – Tony Stewart
4. #39 – Ryan Newman
5. #24 – Jeff Gordon
6. #1 – Martin Truex Jr.
7. #25 – Brad Keselowski
8. #16 – Greg Biffle
9. #20 – Joey Logano
10. #17 – Matt Kenseth

Failed to qualify: #41 – Jeremy Mayfield*, #82 – Scott Speed*, #64 – Geoff Bodine (withdrew)

- Jeremy Mayfield had already failed to make the field, but just a few short hours before the start of the race, it has been announced that Mayfield has been suspended by NASCAR for violating its substance abuse policy.
- Scott Speed drove Joe Nemechek's #87 Toyota in the race after failing to qualify.
- Clint Bowyer crashed out of the race on lap 222, ending his streak of 83 consecutive races without a DNF, just one race away from tying the Cup Series record held by Herman Beam. The record would eventually be broken by Greg Biffle in 2014.

==== Sprint All-Star Race XXV ====
The 2009 NASCAR Sprint All-Star Race is a non-points event, held on Saturday, May 16, at the Lowe's Motor Speedway. Sam Hornish Jr. won the Sprint Showdown race prior to the start of the All-Star Race, allowing him and runner up Jamie McMurray to transfer into the main event. Joey Logano won the fan vote that also lets one driver not eligible to run the All-Star race to make the event on account of a popular vote by the fans. Jimmie Johnson led the first 50 laps in the event before the lead switched back and forth between Kyle Busch and Jeff Gordon. Matt Kenseth would take the lead on lap 95, but with four laps to go Tony Stewart pulled up alongside in what was an exciting battle for the lead. Stewart would overtake Kenseth with two laps to go and hold on for the race win.

Top 10 results (Showdown)

1. #77 - Sam Hornish Jr.
2. #26 - Jamie McMurray
3. #12 - David Stremme
4. #00 - David Reutimann
5. #20 - Joey Logano
6. #1 - Martin Truex Jr.
7. #44 - A. J. Allmendinger
8. #6 - David Ragan
9. #7 - Robby Gordon
10. #47 - Marcos Ambrose

Top 10 results (All-Star)

1. #14 – Tony Stewart
2. #17 – Matt Kenseth
3. #2 – Kurt Busch
4. #11 – Denny Hamlin
5. #99 – Carl Edwards
6. #5 – Mark Martin
7. #18 – Kyle Busch
8. #20 – Joey Logano
9. #26 – Jamie McMurray
10. #88 – Dale Earnhardt Jr.

==== Coca-Cola 600 ====
The 50th Coca-Cola 600, NASCAR's longest race of the season, was scheduled to run on Sunday, May 24, but due to rain the race was postponed to Monday, May 25 on Memorial Day. Ryan Newman won the pole. On lap 222, rain hit the track throwing out the yellow flag. When drivers and teams decided on pit strategy in the ensuing couple laps, David Reutimann chose to stay out on the track, inheriting the race lead. The race was stopped on lap 227 and never restarted. Reutimann was declared the winner.

Top 10 results

1. #00 – David Reutimann*
2. #39 – Ryan Newman
3. #7 – Robby Gordon
4. #99 – Carl Edwards
5. #83 – Brian Vickers
6. #18 – Kyle Busch
7. #9 – Kasey Kahne
8. #42 – Juan Pablo Montoya
9. #20 – Joey Logano
10. #17 – Matt Kenseth

Failed to qualify: #41 – J. J. Yeley, #73 – Mike Garvey, #64 – Todd Bodine, #06 – David Starr

- This was David Reutimann's first career Sprint Cup Series victory, and the first Cup victory for Michael Waltrip Racing.
- This was the shortest running of the Coca-Cola 600 in the race's history, ending after only 340.5 miles.
- Due to the race being held on Memorial Day, on lap 163, or at 3:00 pm EDT, NASCAR threw the caution flag and then momentarily threw the red flag and stopped the race to hold a moment of silence in honor of those who died serving in the United States Military.

==== Autism Speaks 400 ====
The Autism Speaks 400 was held at Dover International Speedway on Sunday, May 31. David Reutimann won the pole for the race. Jimmie Johnson was the class of the field, leading 298 of 400 laps.

Top 10 results

1. #48 – Jimmie Johnson
2. #14 – Tony Stewart
3. #16 – Greg Biffle
4. #17 – Matt Kenseth
5. #2 – Kurt Busch
6. #9 – Kasey Kahne
7. #99 – Carl Edwards
8. #39 – Ryan Newman
9. #07 – Casey Mears
10. #5 – Mark Martin

Failed to qualify: #25 – Brad Keselowski, #13 – Max Papis, #75 – Derrike Cope, #06 – David Starr, #41 – J. J. Yeley (withdrew), #64 – Todd Bodine (withdrew)

==== Pocono 500 ====
The Pocono 500 was held on Sunday, June 7 at Pocono Raceway. Tony Stewart won the pole, but started in the back of the field after crashing in practice.

Top 10 results

1. #14 – Tony Stewart*
2. #99 – Carl Edwards
3. #00 – David Reutimann
4. #24 – Jeff Gordon
5. #39 – Ryan Newman
6. #47 – Marcos Ambrose
7. #48 – Jimmie Johnson
8. #42 – Juan Pablo Montoya
9. #31 – Jeff Burton
10. #77 – Sam Hornish Jr.

Failed to qualify: #75 – Derrike Cope, #64 – Mike Wallace, #37 – Tony Raines, #06 – Trevor Boys (withdrew)

- By winning this race, Tony Stewart became the first owner-driver to win a Cup Series points race since Ricky Rudd in October 1998.

==== Lifelock 400 ====
The LifeLock 400 was held on Sunday, June 14 at Michigan International Speedway. Brian Vickers took the pole.

Top 10 results

1. #5 – Mark Martin
2. #24 – Jeff Gordon
3. #11 – Denny Hamlin
4. #99 – Carl Edwards
5. #16 – Greg Biffle
6. #42 – Juan Pablo Montoya
7. #14 – Tony Stewart
8. #2 – Kurt Busch
9. #83 – Brian Vickers
10. #33 – Clint Bowyer

Failed to qualify: #36 – Mike Skinner

==== Toyota/Save Mart 350 ====
The Toyota/Save Mart 350 was held on Sunday, June 21 at Infineon Raceway.

Top 10 results

1. #9 – Kasey Kahne
2. #14 – Tony Stewart
3. #47 – Marcos Ambrose
4. #48 – Jimmie Johnson
5. #11 – Denny Hamlin
6. #42 – Juan Pablo Montoya
7. #44 – A. J. Allmendinger
8. #33 – Clint Bowyer
9. #24 – Jeff Gordon
10. #19 – Elliott Sadler

Failed to qualify: #82 – Scott Speed*, #27 – Tom Hubert, #37 – Chris Cook, #36 – Brian Simo

- Similar to Darlington, Scott Speed took over Joe Nemechek's #87 Toyota for the race after failing to qualify.

==== Lenox Industrial Tools 301 ====
The Lenox Industrial Tools 301 was held on Sunday, June 28 at New Hampshire Motor Speedway. Tony Stewart took the pole. The race was stopped on lap 273 due to rain.

Top 10 results

1. #20 – Joey Logano
2. #24 – Jeff Gordon
3. #2 – Kurt Busch
4. #00 – David Reutimann
5. #14 – Tony Stewart
6. #09 – Brad Keselowski
7. #18 – Kyle Busch
8. #77 – Sam Hornish Jr.
9. #48 – Jimmie Johnson
10. #9 – Kasey Kahne

Failed to qualify: #51 – Dexter Bean, #27 – Ted Christopher, #64 – Mike Wallace (withdrew)

- This was Joey Logano's first career Cup Series victory.

==== Coke Zero 400 ====
The Coke Zero 400 was held on Saturday, July 4 at Daytona International Speedway. Tony Stewart took the pole.

Top 10 results

1. #14 – Tony Stewart
2. #48 – Jimmie Johnson
3. #11 – Denny Hamlin
4. #99 – Carl Edwards
5. #2 – Kurt Busch
6. #47 – Marcos Ambrose
7. #83 – Brian Vickers
8. #17 – Matt Kenseth
9. #42 – Juan Pablo Montoya
10. #19 – Elliott Sadler

Failed to qualify: #13 – Max Papis, #64 – Mike Wallace (withdrew)

==== LifeLock.com 400 ====
The LifeLock.com 400 was held on Saturday, July 11 at Chicagoland Speedway. Brian Vickers took the pole.

Top 10 results

1. #5 – Mark Martin
2. #24 – Jeff Gordon
3. #9 – Kasey Kahne
4. #14 – Tony Stewart
5. #11 – Denny Hamlin
6. #39 – Ryan Newman
7. #83 – Brian Vickers
8. #48 – Jimmie Johnson
9. #33 – Clint Bowyer
10. #42 – Juan Pablo Montoya

Failed to qualify: #64 – Mike Wallace, #51 – Dexter Bean, #37 – Tony Raines

==== Allstate 400 at the Brickyard ====
The Allstate 400 was held on Sunday, July 26 at Indianapolis Motor Speedway. Mark Martin took the pole.

Top 10 results

1. #48 – Jimmie Johnson
2. #5 – Mark Martin
3. #14 – Tony Stewart
4. #16 – Greg Biffle
5. #83 – Brian Vickers
6. #29 – Kevin Harvick
7. #9 – Kasey Kahne
8. #00 – David Reutimann
9. #24 – Jeff Gordon
10. #17 – Matt Kenseth

Failed to qualify: #09 – Sterling Marlin, #13 – Max Papis, #75 – Derrike Cope, #64 – Mike Wallace (withdrew)

==== Sunoco Red Cross Pennsylvania 500 ====
The Sunoco Red Cross Pennsylvania 500 was held on Monday, August 3 at Pocono Raceway. Tony Stewart took the pole.

Top 10 results

1. #11 – Denny Hamlin
2. #42 – Juan Pablo Montoya
3. #33 – Clint Bowyer
4. #77 – Sam Hornish Jr.
5. #9 – Kasey Kahne
6. #83 – Brian Vickers
7. #5 – Mark Martin
8. #24 – Jeff Gordon
9. #2 – Kurt Busch
10. #14 – Tony Stewart

Failed to qualify: #75 – Derrike Cope (withdrew)

==== Heluva Good! Sour Cream Dips at The Glen ====
The Heluva Good! Sour Cream Dips at The Glen was held on Monday, August 10 at Watkins Glen International. Jimmie Johnson took the pole.

Top 10 results

1. #14 – Tony Stewart
2. #47 – Marcos Ambrose
3. #99 – Carl Edwards
4. #18 – Kyle Busch
5. #16 – Greg Biffle
6. #42 – Juan Pablo Montoya
7. #2 – Kurt Busch
8. #13 – Max Papis*
9. #33 – Clint Bowyer
10. #11 – Denny Hamlin

Failed to qualify: #87 – Joe Nemechek, #36 – Brian Simo, #70 – David Gilliland

- Max Papis picked up his best finish in the Cup Series and his first top-10 finish. This was also the first Cup Series top-10 for Germain Racing.

==== Carfax 400 ====
The Carfax 400 was held on Sunday, August 16 at Michigan International Speedway. Brian Vickers took the pole.

Top 10 results

1. #83 – Brian Vickers*
2. #24 – Jeff Gordon
3. #88 – Dale Earnhardt Jr.
4. #99 – Carl Edwards
5. #77 – Sam Hornish Jr.
6. #07 – Casey Mears
7. #20 – Joey Logano
8. #33 – Clint Bowyer
9. #00 – David Reutimann
10. #11 – Denny Hamlin

Failed to qualify: #37 – Tony Raines, #08 – Terry Labonte (withdrew), #64 – Mike Wallace (withdrew)

- This was the first NASCAR victory for the Red Bull Racing Team.

==== Sharpie 500 ====
The Sharpie 500 was held on Saturday, August 22 at Bristol Motor Speedway. Mark Martin took the pole.

Top 10 results

1. #18 – Kyle Busch
2. #5 – Mark Martin
3. #47 – Marcos Ambrose
4. #16 – Greg Biffle
5. #11 – Denny Hamlin
6. #39 – Ryan Newman
7. #2 – Kurt Busch
8. #48 – Jimmie Johnson
9. #88 – Dale Earnhardt Jr.
10. #17 – Matt Kenseth

Failed to qualify: #36 – Mike Skinner, #13 – Max Papis, #64 – Mike Wallace, #09 – Aric Almirola, #51 – Dexter Bean (withdrew)

==== Pep Boys Auto 500 ====
The Pep Boys Auto 500 was held on Sunday, September 6 at Atlanta Motor Speedway. Martin Truex Jr. took the pole but.

Top 10 results

1. #9 – Kasey Kahne
2. #29 – Kevin Harvick
3. #42 – Juan Pablo Montoya
4. #00 – David Reutimann
5. #5 – Mark Martin
6. #11 – Denny Hamlin
7. #83 – Brian Vickers
8. #24 – Jeff Gordon
9. #39 – Ryan Newman
10. #16 – Greg Biffle

Failed to qualify: #78 – Regan Smith, #36 – Patrick Carpentier, #37 – Tony Raines

==== Chevy Rock & Roll 400 ====
The Chevy Rock & Roll 400 was held on Saturday, September 12 at Richmond International Raceway. Mark Martin took the pole.

Top 10 results

1. #11 – Denny Hamlin
2. #2 – Kurt Busch
3. #24 – Jeff Gordon
4. #5 – Mark Martin
5. #18 – Kyle Busch
6. #33 – Clint Bowyer
7. #83 – Brian Vickers
8. #77 – Sam Hornish Jr.
9. #29 – Kevin Harvick
10. #39 – Ryan Newman

Failed to qualify: #37 – Tony Raines

=== Chase for the Sprint Cup ===
==== Sylvania 300 ====
The Sylvania 300 was held on Sunday, September 20 at New Hampshire Motor Speedway. Juan Pablo Montoya took the pole.

Top 10 results

1. #5 – Mark Martin*
2. #11 – Denny Hamlin
3. #42 – Juan Pablo Montoya
4. #48 – Jimmie Johnson
5. #18 – Kyle Busch
6. #2 – Kurt Busch
7. #39 – Ryan Newman
8. #19 – Elliott Sadler
9. #16 – Greg Biffle
10. #33 – Clint Bowyer

Failed to qualify: #75 – Derrike Cope, #51 – Dexter Bean

- This was Martin's 40th and final Cup Series victory.

==== AAA 400 ====
The AAA 400 was held on Sunday, September 27 at Dover International Speedway. Jimmie Johnson took the pole.

Top 10 results

1. #48 – Jimmie Johnson
2. #5 – Mark Martin
3. #17 – Matt Kenseth
4. #42 – Juan Pablo Montoya
5. #2 – Kurt Busch
6. #24 – Jeff Gordon
7. #44 – A. J. Allmendinger
8. #9 – Kasey Kahne
9. #14 – Tony Stewart
10. #39 – Ryan Newman

Failed to qualify: #4 – Scott Wimmer

==== Price Chopper 400 ====
The Price Chopper 400 was held on Sunday, October 4 at Kansas Speedway. Mark Martin took the pole.

Top 10 results

1. #14 – Tony Stewart
2. #24 – Jeff Gordon
3. #16 – Greg Biffle
4. #42 – Juan Pablo Montoya
5. #11 – Denny Hamlin
6. #9 – Kasey Kahne
7. #5 – Mark Martin
8. #00 – David Reutimann
9. #48 – Jimmie Johnson
10. #99 – Carl Edwards

Failed to qualify: #04 – David Gilliland, #36 – Michael McDowell, #37 – Kevin Hamlin

==== Pepsi 500 ====
The Pepsi 500 was held on Sunday, October 11 at Auto Club Speedway. Denny Hamlin took the pole.

Top 10 results

1. #48 – Jimmie Johnson*
2. #24 – Jeff Gordon
3. #42 – Juan Pablo Montoya
4. #5 – Mark Martin
5. #14 – Tony Stewart
6. #99 – Carl Edwards
7. #6 – David Ragan
8. #2 – Kurt Busch
9. #33 – Clint Bowyer
10. #29 – Kevin Harvick

Failed to qualify: #37 – Tony Raines, #64 – Mike Wallace

- After winning this race, Jimmie Johnson took the championship lead for the first time in 2009, and would hold it for the rest of the season.

==== NASCAR Banking 500 only from Bank of America ====
The NASCAR Banking 500 only from Bank of America was held on Saturday, October 17 at Lowe's Motor Speedway. Jimmie Johnson took the pole.

Top 10 results

1. #48 – Jimmie Johnson
2. #17 – Matt Kenseth
3. #9 – Kasey Kahne
4. #24 – Jeff Gordon
5. #20 – Joey Logano
6. #33 – Clint Bowyer
7. #07 – Casey Mears
8. #18 – Kyle Busch
9. #1 – Martin Truex Jr.
10. #2 – Kurt Busch

Failed to qualify: #36 – Michael McDowell, #09 – Sterling Marlin, #66 – Dave Blaney, #37 – Travis Kvapil, #64 – Mike Wallace (withdrew)

==== TUMS Fast Relief 500 ====
The TUMS Fast Relief 500 was held on Sunday, October 25 at Martinsville Speedway. Ryan Newman took the pole.

Top 10 results

1. #11 – Denny Hamlin
2. #48 – Jimmie Johnson
3. #42 – Juan Pablo Montoya
4. #18 – Kyle Busch
5. #24 – Jeff Gordon
6. #26 – Jamie McMurray
7. #39 – Ryan Newman
8. #5 – Mark Martin
9. #14 – Tony Stewart
10. #29 – Kevin Harvick

Failed to qualify: #73 – Josh Wise, #75 – Derrike Cope (withdrew)

==== AMP Energy 500 ====
The AMP Energy 500 was held on Sunday, November 1 at Talladega Superspeedway. Jimmie Johnson took the pole.

Top 10 results

1. #26 – Jamie McMurray
2. #9 – Kasey Kahne
3. #20 – Joey Logano
4. #16 – Greg Biffle
5. #31 – Jeff Burton
6. #48 – Jimmie Johnson
7. #55 – Michael Waltrip
8. #09 – Brad Keselowski
9. #19 – Elliott Sadler
10. #71 – Bobby Labonte

Failed to qualify: #37 – Tony Raines (withdrew)

==== Dickies 500 ====
The Dickies 500 was held on Sunday, November 8 at Texas Motor Speedway. Jeff Gordon took the pole.

Top 10 results

1. #2 – Kurt Busch
2. #11 – Denny Hamlin
3. #17 – Matt Kenseth
4. #5 – Mark Martin
5. #29 – Kevin Harvick
6. #14 – Tony Stewart
7. #33 – Clint Bowyer
8. #16 – Greg Biffle
9. #31 – Jeff Burton
10. #44 – A. J. Allmendinger

Failed to qualify: #37 – Tony Raines, #66 – Dave Blaney, #13 – Max Papis, #09 – Mike Bliss, #08 – Derrike Cope (withdrew)

- Jimmie Johnson's championship run suffered a major blow in a lap 4 crash with Sam Hornish Jr.. Johnson returned to the race, but finished 129 laps down in 38th, reducing Johnson's 184-point lead over Mark Martin to only 73.

==== Checker O'Reilly Auto Parts 500 ====
The Checker O'Reilly Auto Parts 500 was held on Sunday, November 15 at Phoenix International Raceway. Martin Truex Jr. took the pole.

Top 10 results

1. #48 – Jimmie Johnson*
2. #31 – Jeff Burton
3. #11 – Denny Hamlin
4. #5 – Mark Martin
5. #1 – Martin Truex Jr.
6. #2 – Kurt Busch
7. #33 – Clint Bowyer
8. #42 – Juan Pablo Montoya
9. #24 – Jeff Gordon
10. #00 – David Reutimann

Failed to qualify: #78 – Regan Smith, #70 – Kevin Conway, #02 – Brandon Ash

- Johnson's victory extended his points lead to 108 points over Mark Martin. Johnson would have to finish 25th or better at Homestead to win the championship.

==== Ford 400 ====
The Ford 400 was held on Sunday, November 22 at Homestead-Miami Speedway. Jimmie Johnson took the pole.

Top 10 results

1. #11 – Denny Hamlin
2. #31 – Jeff Burton
3. #29 – Kevin Harvick
4. #2 – Kurt Busch
5. #48 – Jimmie Johnson*
6. #24 – Jeff Gordon*
7. #99 – Carl Edwards
8. #18 – Kyle Busch
9. #1 – Martin Truex Jr.
10. #44 – A. J. Allmendinger

Failed to qualify: #87 – Joe Nemechek, #66 – Dave Blaney, #70 – Mike Skinner, #13 – Max Papis, #09 – David Stremme, #7 – Matt Crafton*

- By finishing 4th, Jimmie Johnson won his record-breaking 4th consecutive Sprint Cup Series championship by 141 points over Mark Martin, who finished 2nd in points for the fifth time in his career.
- With Jeff Gordon finishing 3rd in points behind teammates Johnson and Martin, Hendrick Motorsports became the first Cup Series team in NASCAR's modern era to finish 1-2-3 in the final points standings in a season.
- Truck Series driver Matt Crafton practiced and qualified the #7 Toyota for Robby Gordon, who was competing in the Baja 1000 in Mexico.

== Results and standings ==
No.	Race	Pole position	Most laps led	Winning driver	Manufacturer	Report
	Budweiser Shootout	Paul Menard	Dale Earnhardt Jr.	Kevin Harvick	Chevrolet	Report
	Gatorade Duel 1	Martin Truex Jr.	Jeff Gordon	Jeff Gordon	Chevrolet	Report
	Gatorade Duel 2	Mark Martin	Kyle Busch	Kyle Busch	Toyota	Report
1	Daytona 500	Martin Truex Jr.	Kyle Busch	Matt Kenseth	Ford	Report
2	Auto Club 500	Brian Vickers	Matt Kenseth	Matt Kenseth	Ford	Report
3	Shelby 427	Kyle Busch	Jimmie Johnson	Kyle Busch	Toyota	Report
4	Kobalt Tools 500	Mark Martin	Kurt Busch	Kurt Busch	Dodge	Report
5	Food City 500	Mark Martin	Kyle Busch	Kyle Busch	Toyota	Report
6	Goody's Fast Pain Relief 500	Jeff Gordon	Denny Hamlin	Jimmie Johnson	Chevrolet	Report
7	Samsung 500	David Reutimann	Jeff Gordon	Jeff Gordon	Chevrolet	Report
8	Subway Fresh Fit 500	Mark Martin	Mark Martin	Mark Martin	Chevrolet	Report
9	Aaron's 499	Juan Pablo Montoya	Kyle Busch	Brad Keselowski	Chevrolet	Report
10	Crown Royal presents the Russ Friedman 400	Brian Vickers	Denny Hamlin	Kyle Busch	Toyota	Report
11	Southern 500 presented by GoDaddy.com	Matt Kenseth	Greg Biffle	Mark Martin	Chevrolet	Report
	Sprint Showdown	Kirk Shelmerdine	Jamie McMurray	Sam Hornish Jr.	Dodge	Report
	NASCAR Sprint All-Star Race	Jimmie Johnson	Kevin Harvick	Tony Stewart	Chevrolet	Report
12	Coca-Cola 600	Ryan Newman	Kyle Busch	David Reutimann	Toyota	Report
13	Autism Speaks 400	David Reutimann	Jimmie Johnson	Jimmie Johnson	Chevrolet	Report
14	Pocono 500	Tony Stewart	Carl Edwards	Tony Stewart	Chevrolet	Report
15	LifeLock 400	Brian Vickers	Jimmie Johnson	Mark Martin	Chevrolet	Report
16	Toyota/Save Mart 350	Brian Vickers	Kasey Kahne	Kasey Kahne	Dodge	Report
17	Lenox Industrial Tools 301	Jimmie Johnson	Jimmie Johnson	Joey Logano	Toyota	Report
18	Coke Zero 400	Tony Stewart	Tony Stewart	Tony Stewart	Chevrolet	Report
19	LifeLock.com 400	Brian Vickers	Mark Martin	Mark Martin	Chevrolet	Report
20	Allstate 400 at the Brickyard	Mark Martin	Juan Pablo Montoya	Jimmie Johnson	Chevrolet	Report
21	Sunoco Red Cross Pennsylvania 500	Tony Stewart	Denny Hamlin	Denny Hamlin	Toyota	Report
22	Heluva Good! Sour Cream Dips at The Glen	Jimmie Johnson	Tony Stewart	Tony Stewart	Chevrolet	Report
23	Carfax 400	Brian Vickers	Jimmie Johnson	Brian Vickers	Toyota	Report
24	Sharpie 500	Mark Martin	Mark Martin	Kyle Busch	Toyota	Report
25	Pep Boys Auto 500	Martin Truex Jr.	Martin Truex Jr.	Kasey Kahne	Dodge	Report
26	Chevy Rock & Roll 400	Mark Martin	Denny Hamlin	Denny Hamlin	Toyota	Report
Chase for the Sprint Cup
27	Sylvania 300	Juan Pablo Montoya	Juan Pablo Montoya	Mark Martin	Chevrolet	Report
28	AAA 400	Jimmie Johnson	Jimmie Johnson	Jimmie Johnson	Chevrolet	Report
29	Price Chopper 400	Mark Martin	Greg Biffle	Tony Stewart	Chevrolet	Report
30	Pepsi 500	Denny Hamlin	Jimmie Johnson	Jimmie Johnson	Chevrolet	Report
31	NASCAR Banking 500 only from Bank of America	Jimmie Johnson	Jimmie Johnson	Jimmie Johnson	Chevrolet	Report
32	TUMS Fast Relief 500	Ryan Newman	Denny Hamlin	Denny Hamlin	Toyota	Report
33	AMP Energy 500	Jimmie Johnson	Jamie McMurray	Jamie McMurray	Ford	Report
34	Dickies 500	Jeff Gordon	Kyle Busch	Kurt Busch	Dodge	Report
35	Checker O'Reilly Auto Parts 500	Martin Truex Jr.	Jimmie Johnson	Jimmie Johnson	Chevrolet	Report
36	Ford 400	Jimmie Johnson	Denny Hamlin	Denny Hamlin	Toyota	Report

=== Drivers' championship ===
(key) Bold - Pole position awarded by time. Italics - Pole position set by owner's points standings. * – Most laps led.

Pos.	Driver	DAY	CAL	LVS	ATL	BRI	MAR	TEX	PHO	TAL	RCH	DAR	CLT	DOV	POC	MCH	SON	NHA	DAY	CHI	IND	POC	GLN	MCH	BRI	ATL	RCH	NHA	DOV	KAN	CAL	CLT	MAR	TAL	TEX	PHO	HOM	Points
1	Jimmie Johnson	31	9	24*	9	3	1	2	4	30	36	2	13	1*	7	22*	4	9*	2	8	1	13	**12**	33*	8	36	11	4	**1***	9	1*	**1***	2	6	38	1*	**5**	6652
2	Mark Martin	16	40	40	**31**	**6**	7	6	**1***	43	5	1	17	10	19	1	35	14	38	1*	**2**	7	23	31	**2***	5	**4**	1	2	**7**	4	17	8	28	4	4	12	6511
3	Jeff Gordon	13	2	6	2	4	4	1*	25	37	8	5	14	26	4	2	9	2	28	2	9	8	37	2	23	8	3	15	6	2	2	4	5	20	**13**	9	6	6473
4	Kurt Busch	10	5	23	1*	11	18	8	3	6	12	16	34	5	37	8	15	3	5	17	27	9	7	36	7	38	2	6	5	11	8	10	17	30	1	6	4	6446
5	Denny Hamlin	26	6	22	13	2	2*	12	6	22	14*	13	11	36	38	3	5	15	3	5	34	1*	10	10	5	6	1*	2	22	5	**37**	42	1*	38	2	3	1*	6335
6	Tony Stewart	8	8	26	8	17	3	4	2	23	2	3	19	2	1	7	2	5	1*	4	3	10	1*	17	33	11	17	14	9	1	5	13	9	35	6	25	22	6309
7	Greg Biffle	20	4	7	34	39	28	3	5	7	17	8*	20	3	11	5	28	18	18	31	4	15	5	20	4	10	13	9	13	3*	20	16	25	4	8	14	14	6292
8	Juan Pablo Montoya	14	11	31	27	9	12	7	24	**20**	10	20	8	30	8	6	6	12	9	10	11*	2	6	19	25	3	19	**3***	4	4	3	35	3	19	37	8	38	6252
9	Ryan Newman	36	28	25	22	7	6	15	16	3	4	4	**2**	8	5	23	17	29	20	6	14	14	21	15	6	9	10	7	10	22	15	11	**7**	36	12	20	23	6175
10	Kasey Kahne	29	12	11	7	5	19	19	13	36	29	23	7	6	15	21	1*	10	15	3	7	5	17	11	28	1	12	38	8	6	34	3	32	2	33	15	17	6128
11	Carl Edwards	18	7	17	3	15	26	10	10	24	26	32	4	7	2*	4	13	19	4	14	15	18	3	4	16	37	15	17	11	10	6	39	20	14	39	16	7	6118
12	Brian Vickers	39	**10**	8	5	29	33	16	19	8	**15**	31	5	25	21	**9**	**16**	35	7	**7**	5	6	11	**1**	12	7	7	11	18	37	29	34	11	13	26	38	20	5929
Chase for the Sprint Cup cut-off
Pos.	Driver	DAY	CAL	LVS	ATL	BRI	MAR	TEX	PHO	TAL	RCH	DAR	CLT	DOV	POC	MCH	SON	NHA	DAY	CHI	IND	POC	GLN	MCH	BRI	ATL	RCH	NHA	DOV	KAN	CAL	CLT	MAR	TAL	TEX	PHO	HOM	Points
13	Kyle Busch	41*	3	**1**	18	1*	24	18	17	25*	1	34	6*	23	22	13	22	7	14	33	38	16	4	23	1	13	5	5	31	12	24^{†}	8	4	15	11*	12	8	4457
14	Matt Kenseth	1	1*	43	12	33	23	5	27	17	13	**10**	10	4	16	20	18	22	8	23	10	11	14	14	10	12	25	23	3	39	13	2	14	24	3	18	13	4389
15	Clint Bowyer	4	19	2	6	13	5	22	26	39	18	37	36	11	12	10	8	20	29	9	18	3	9	8	21	29	6	10	15	21	9	6	19	12	7	7	11	4359
16	David Reutimann	12	14	4	32	12	20	**11**	8	26	28	29	1	**18**	3	19	31	4	36	12	8	29	25	9	17	4	20	12	21	8	18	15	16	26	16	10	15	4221
17	Jeff Burton	28	32	3	14	8	15	9	15	10	3	12	25	16	9	26	34	31	16	37	25	21	38	18	18	34	18	16	16	23	30	14	15	5	9	2	2	4022
18	Marcos Ambrose	17	22	20	38	10	14	41	14	4	11	33	26	20	6	31	3	23	6	11	22	34	2	35	3	23	22	20	14	14	23	22	27	34	15	11	35	3830
19	Kevin Harvick	2	38	12	4	30	11	27	30	38	34	11	41	17	24	18	29	34	26	19	6	12	35	12	38	2	9	32	12	24	10	18	10	21	5	24	3	3796
20	Joey Logano **(R)**	43	26	13	30	38	32	30	21	9	19	9	9	15	23	25	19	1	19	18	12	27	16	7	34	22	14	21	42	28	14	5	12	3	19	21	24	3791
21	Casey Mears	15	24	30	16	24	21	21	20	16	9	36	33	9	14	24	23	11	34	28	19	25	15	6	13	25	30	13	17	15	11	7	18	25	21	27	19	3759
22	Jamie McMurray	37	16	9	15	37	10	38	11	42	7	22	21	14	13	11	14	33	11	22	21	20	40	32	11	28	27	18	28	31	36	33	6	1*	20	19	18	3604
23	Martin Truex Jr.	**11**	27	32	10	26	29	25	7	33	22	6	23	21	18	36	25	37	25	16	17	19	28	21	22	**26***	37	19	33	16	22	9	28	31	14	**5**	9	3503
24	A. J. Allmendinger	3	29	33	17	16	9	34	35	35	21	17	32	29	30	39	7	32	17	13	20	17	13	22	37	20	23	25	7	17	33	23	34	33	10	13	10	3476
25	Dale Earnhardt Jr.	27	39	10	11	14	8	20	31	2	27	27	40	12	27	14	26	13	39	15	36	28	39	3	9	17	21	35	20	36	25	38	29	11	25	35	28	3422
26	Elliott Sadler	5	25	29	20	20	31	32	32	19	25	14	31	27	25	12	10	26	10	27	40	24	32	25	26	21	34	8	30	20	32	26	21	9	22	28	41	3350
27	David Ragan	6	17	42	19	27	27	37	22	12	23	38	24	24	26	15	33	38	13	25	24	22	24	30	14	33	33	33	24	35	7	20	22	17	17	23	34	3252
28	Sam Hornish Jr.	32	23	16	37	31	34	17	9	34	6	30	16	13	10	29	38	8	32	38	37	4	36	5	35	35	8	37	26	18	12	40	36	40	40	17	21	3203
29	Reed Sorenson	9	21	34	33	23	17	36	12	11	20	19	35	19	20	27	40	17	33	24	13	35	31	29	19	27	16	36	35	26	31	21	24	16	36	26	40	3147
30	Bobby Labonte	22	20	5	40	22	16	40	29	28	31	18	12	28	28	28	20	21	21	21	23	36	20	43	36	18	31	22	23	43	26	31	13	10	31	39	31	3128
31	Paul Menard	38	37	35	28	25	25	13	23	13	30	15	29	32	29	34	21	30	23	35	29	26	19	26	24	15	28	34	19	30	27	27	23	42	29	29	26	2979
32	David Stremme	33	13	18	23	19	22	14	18	31	38	24	22	31	34	38	39	28	35	26	16	32	26	13	20	14	26	28	29	25	16	19	33	22			DNQ	2919
33	Michael Waltrip	7	15	27	25	32	13	24	37	21	24	40	30	35	17	30		24	37	20	35	31		27	31	32	32	27	36	38	17	32	30	7	23	36	30	2839
34	Robby Gordon	34	30	15	26	21	40	39	39	29	16	28	3	33	31	17	36	25	22	34	28	33	18	37	32	16		24	34	34	38	30	37	32	27	22	39	2699
35	Scott Speed **(R)**	35	41	21	35	28	39	DNQ	34	5	33	26^{+}	18	37	32	37	37^{+}	36	31	36	31	23	22	34	15	24	36	31	25	27	21	28	31	27	18	33	27	2690
36	John Andretti	19	31	28	29	34	35	26	38	27	32			34	35	33	30	16	27	30	32	30	30	28	30	31	29	26	27	33	19	36	26	23	24	34	33	2597
37	David Gilliland		33	14	24	36	36	29	33	40	39	43	27	43	42	32	32	40	40	42	30	41	DNQ	40	39	19	24		39	DNQ	42	25	39		28	30	29	1928
38	Brad Keselowski	DNQ		38				23		1		7		DNQ				6	24	32				24			38			13		12		8	35	37	25	1528
39	Regan Smith	21		19				31	28	15		21		22	33			27	12		39				24	DNQ	40		32		28			39	32	DNQ	32	1440
40	Joe Nemechek	DNQ	43	41	39	41	41	DNQ	41	14	40	QL	37	38	41	42	QL	39	41	41	43	39	DNQ	39	41	42	35	40	41	42	39	43	38	43	42	40	DNQ	1342
41	Dave Blaney		42	DNQ	41	43	42	43	42		43	41	28	39	40	40	42	42	43	43	42	40	42	42	43	43	43	42	37	40	41	DNQ	40	41	DNQ	42	DNQ	1204
42	Bill Elliott	23			36			28					15			16				29	26			16						19		29			34		16	1095
43	Max Papis			36				35		18		35	42	DNQ		35	12		DNQ		DNQ		8		DNQ	40	37			32	35	41		29	DNQ	32	DNQ	1047
44	Mike Bliss				43			42			37		43	40						40				38		41	42		40	41	43	24			DNQ			577
45	Tony Raines	DNQ	DNQ	DNQ			DNQ		43		41	25	39	42	DNQ	43		41	30	DNQ		42		DNQ	42	DNQ	DNQ	43	43		DNQ			Wth	DNQ	43		528
46	Aric Almirola	30	35	39	21	35	37	33																	DNQ			29										527
47	Erik Darnell																									30		30		29				37	30	31	36	472
48	Scott Riggs	25	36	DNQ	DNQ	DNQ	30	DNQ	36	41	42	39	38																									448
49	Travis Kvapil	42	18	DNQ	42	18																										DNQ	43				37	378
50	Patrick Carpentier														43		11	43	42			37	33			DNQ												351
51	Terry Labonte	24																			33				40	39						37					42	338
52	Michael McDowell									DNQ																	41	41	38	DNQ	40	DNQ	41		41	41	43	326
53	Sterling Marlin		DNQ	DNQ		40	DNQ		40			42			39	41					DNQ	38										DNQ	35					316
54	Jeremy Mayfield	40	34	DNQ	DNQ	DNQ	38	DNQ	DNQ	32	35	DNQ																										288
55	Mike Skinner	DNQ												41		DNQ				39	41			41	DNQ										43		DNQ	200
56	Ron Fellows																27						29															158
57	Boris Said	DNQ															24						34															152
58	Todd Bodine		DNQ	37	DNQ	42	43	DNQ	DNQ		DNQ		DNQ																									123
59	Robert Richardson Jr.																																	18				109
60	Andy Lally																						27															82
61	Mike Wallace	DNQ													DNQ			Wth	Wth	DNQ	Wth	43		Wth	DNQ			39			DNQ	Wth						80
62	Scott Wimmer																								29				DNQ									76
63	Dexter Bean			DNQ					DNQ						36			DNQ		DNQ								DNQ										55
64	P. J. Jones																43						41															40
65	Brandon Ash								DNQ								41																			DNQ		40
66	Derrike Cope	DNQ					DNQ							DNQ	DNQ						DNQ							DNQ					42					37
67	Tony Ave																						43															34
68	Mike Garvey	DNQ	DNQ	DNQ			Wth						DNQ																									
69	Geoff Bodine	DNQ			DNQ					Wth																												
70	Carl Long	DNQ																																				
71	Kirk Shelmerdine	DNQ																																				
72	Norm Benning	DNQ																																				
73	Kelly Bires	DNQ																																				
74	David Starr		DNQ										DNQ	DNQ																								
75	Dennis Setzer						DNQ																															
76	Trevor Boys								DNQ		DNQ				Wth																							
77	Eric McClure									DNQ																												
78	J. J. Yeley												DNQ	Wth																								
79	Brian Simo																DNQ						DNQ															
80	Tom Hubert																DNQ																					
81	Chris Cook																DNQ																					
82	Ted Christopher																	DNQ																				
83	Kevin Hamlin																													DNQ								
84	Josh Wise																																DNQ					
85	Kevin Conway																																			DNQ		
86	James Hylton	Wth																																				
Pos.	Driver	DAY	CAL	LVS	ATL	BRI	MAR	TEX	PHO	TAL	RCH	DAR	CLT	DOV	POC	MCH	SON	NHA	DAY	CHI	IND	POC	GLN	MCH	BRI	ATL	RCH	NHA	DOV	KAN	CAL	CLT	MAR	TAL	TEX	PHO	HOM	Points
^{†} – Due to feeling sick, Kyle Busch did not complete the race and during a caution, he was replaced by David Gilliland after he started and parked his normal No. 71 car. Since Busch started the race, he is officially credited with the 24th-place finish.^{+} Scott Speed failed to qualify his normal ride, the No. 82 Red Bull Toyota at Darlington and Infineon, but drove Joe Nemechek's No. 87 Toyota for those two races, replacing Nemechek, who made the field and had a relationship with Jay Frye, vice president of Red Bull and the listed owner of Nemechek's No. 13 Ginn Racing Chevrolet in 2007 that would later be merged with Dale Earnhardt, Inc. on July 25, 2007.

Note:This list does not include exhibition races.

== Rookie of the Year ==
The clear favorite for Rookie of the year was 18-year-old standout Joey Logano. Despite struggling early in the year, Logano became the youngest winner in Sprint Cup Series history by winning the rain shortened Lenox Industrial Tools 301. The other competitors, former Formula One drivers Scott Speed and Max Papis, struggled to adjust to stock cars.

== See also ==
- 2009 NASCAR Nationwide Series
- 2009 NASCAR Camping World Truck Series
- 2009 NASCAR Camping World East Series
- 2009 NASCAR Camping World West Series
- 2009 ARCA Re/Max Series
- 2009 NASCAR Whelen Modified Tour
- 2009 NASCAR Whelen Southern Modified Tour
- 2009 NASCAR Canadian Tire Series
- 2009 NASCAR Corona Series
- 2009 NASCAR Mini Stock Series
