= NASCAR rules and regulations =

Motorsport rules specific to NASCAR

NASCAR logo

The National Association for Stock Car Auto Racing (NASCAR) makes and enforces numerous rules and regulations that transcend all racing series.

NASCAR issues a different rule book for each racing series; however, rule books are published exclusively for NASCAR members and are not made available to the public. Still, many of the rules, such as the scoring system, have been widely publicized both by NASCAR and the media.

== Car livery ==
Each car is required to display its number on each door of the car and on its roof. The front of the car and bottom of the rear bumper are required to match the decal specifications of the car manufacturer. Each car was until recently required to display a series of around 30 NASCAR sponsor decals just to the left of each door and on the front fenders, but recent developments have reduced the amount of decals significantly to only a handful. These contingency decals represent series sponsors and bonus money teams are eligible to earn during the race, but may be omitted in the event in which they conflict with the team's sponsors or moral beliefs. The series sponsor's logo is displayed on top of the windshield, called the windshield header or windshield banner.

Beginning in 2013, the livery layout for the NASCAR Cup Series was altered, coinciding with the change to the Generation 6 model car. In lieu of the series sponsor like in lower series, the windshield prominently features the last name of the driver (as well as first name or first initial in the case of siblings and family members, as was the case for both Busch brothers, or suffixes for drivers such as Dale Earnhardt Jr. and Martin Truex Jr.) placed in the center of the windshield header. Logos of the manufacturer are placed on each corner of the upper windshield. Number and sponsor logos were barred from being placed on the headlights and taillights, as not to obstruct each car model's unique characteristics. A new location for a single sponsor logo, however, was added to the rear of the roof adjacent to the number. In 2014, a new layout was created for participants in the NASCAR Chase for the Championship, requiring the cars to feature yellow roof numbers, front splitters and front fascias. The background of the windshield header would also be colored yellow, with the driver's name displayed in black lettering. A new Chase for the Championship logo would replace the normal NASCAR Cup Series logo in the contingency group. A decal would also be placed next to the driver's name above the door to signify each win a driver earned that season. For 2015, the liveries of the Xfinity and Camping World Truck Series would feature the driver's last name on the upper rear window. During the Monster Energy Cup Series era from 2017 to 2019, the Monster Energy logo was on the front windshield with the driver name moving to the rear windshield; this was replaced with the Cup Series logo for 2020 after Monster Energy's sponsorship ended, before NASCAR reinstated the driver name the following season (the Xfinity Series and Camping World Truck Series continued carrying the series title sponsor on the windshield, a practice that began with the Nationwide Series era in 2008 and the birth of the Truck series respectively; drivers running points for Xfinity Series also carry their names on the cars' front windshields in that series). In 2022, with the introduction of the Next Gen model car for the Cup Series, the door number was moved forward on all cars, taking the space formerly occupied by the contingency decals, and the driver name on the front windshield was shifted to the right (the same position as on Xfinity driver windshields for points-eligible drivers) to make room for a cooling duct on the center of the car's windshield, following heat complaints from drivers.

Outside of these requirements, teams may design the car and place sponsor logos in NASCAR-approved locations, and must submit all paint and graphics schemes and all sponsor identity to NASCAR in advance for approval. One paint scheme requirement for example is that both the driver and passenger side of the car must share the same color pattern, though the front and rear may be different colors. This safety rule, to avoid confusion for spotters, NASCAR officials, and other drivers, was brought into light in October 2014 at Talladega, when Terry Labonte's Go Fas Racing team painted his No. 32 car in two different color schemes as a tribute to the two-time champion, but prior to NASCAR approval. NASCAR allowed the team to retain the scheme for knock-out qualifying, but forced them to match the two sides for the race. However, by 2016, it seems that NASCAR has either quietly removed this rule or allowed teams to race with a split-side scheme as long as they got the permission to do so, as seen with John Hunter Nemechek's No. 8 truck in the 2016 American Ethanol E15 225 and both the No. 3 and No. 31 cars of RDV Compétition during the 2016 NASCAR Whelen Euro Series.

Teams apply to NASCAR for the use of a car number, and pay for the rights to the number's likeness. NASCAR legally owns and controls all rights to car numbers. When drivers change teams, the team owner usually retains the number. Unlike in other series, such as the former IROC Series, there is no provision for the defending series champion or the points leader to adopt car number 1; it is available to any team. Only one number, No. 61, in the Whelen Modified Tour, has been retired, in memory of nine-time series champion Richie Evans, who was killed at Martinsville Speedway practicing for the final race of the 1985 season. Other historically significant numbers have been ceremoniously retired, except with the permission of the driver or team owner. The number 3 for example, used by Dale Earnhardt and his car owner Richard Childress, has been unofficially retired for all teams and drivers except for an Earnhardt or Childress family member (Kaz Grala became the first driver who was not part of either family to drive a number 3 car when Austin Dillon missed the 2020 Go Bowling 235 due to a positive COVID-19 test), with Childress paying a licensing fee while the number was out of circulation from 2001 to 2013. In other instances, a number has been relinquished due to a sponsor leaving a team. After the 2002 season, Robert Yates Racing switched from their longtime number 28 to 38 after sponsor Texaco-Havoline ceased their sponsorship.

Teams can run numbers from 0 to 99 (as well as 00 to 09), but no two cars can display the same number during a race. Scoring computers will allow 00 to 09, but teams with such numbers are listed as 100 to 109 for scoring purposes (to ensure "107" is not the same as "7", for example). Except for those numbers (which have been used for full-time teams), part-time teams may be assigned a three-digit number for championship owner points purposes only (such as Nos. 141 and 241). If two such teams arrive with the same two digit number, the team higher in championship points prevails, and the other team will be forced to change their number for the race. The rule is different in combination races when two series race in the same event, where in that situation qualifying determines which team keeps their number.

== Sponsorship ==
=== Tobacco ===
Although NASCAR has a long history of tobacco sponsorship, following the 2003 season, longtime NASCAR partner R. J. Reynolds declined to renew their Winston sponsorship of the Cup Series, replaced by Nextel. In June 2010, the Food and Drug Administration passed new regulations preventing sponsorship for cigarettes or smokeless tobacco products in any sporting event, including auto racing events. The announcement affected two teams: the No. 33 Truck of Ron Hornaday Jr. and Kevin Harvick Incorporated lost its Longhorn Moist Snuff sponsorship, while the No. 27 Nationwide Series car of Baker Curb Racing lost its Red Man sponsorship. Baker Curb would shut its doors the next year due to lack of sponsorship.

In spite of the legislation, tobacco sponsorship continues in the sports through electronic cigarettes, with companies such as Green Smoke, blu (owned by R. J. Reynolds), and Arrowhead sponsoring NASCAR teams. A brand of herbal smokeless tobacco, Smokey Mountain, has also sponsored drivers such as Hornaday, Johnny Sauter, Brian Scott, and Daniel Hemric. Whitetail Smokeless, a brand of chew that also offers a nicotine-free variant, has also sponsored drivers such as Jeremy Clements and Josh Bilicki.

=== Alcohol ===
Until 2004, the only sponsorship permitted by alcoholic beverage manufacturers were for beer; hard liquors were not permitted. For 2005, NASCAR reversed the ban on such sponsorships, with manufacturers being obliged to put responsible drinking messages on cars sponsored by such brands (beer advertisers are not required to carry such messages, however).

=== Viceroy Rule ===
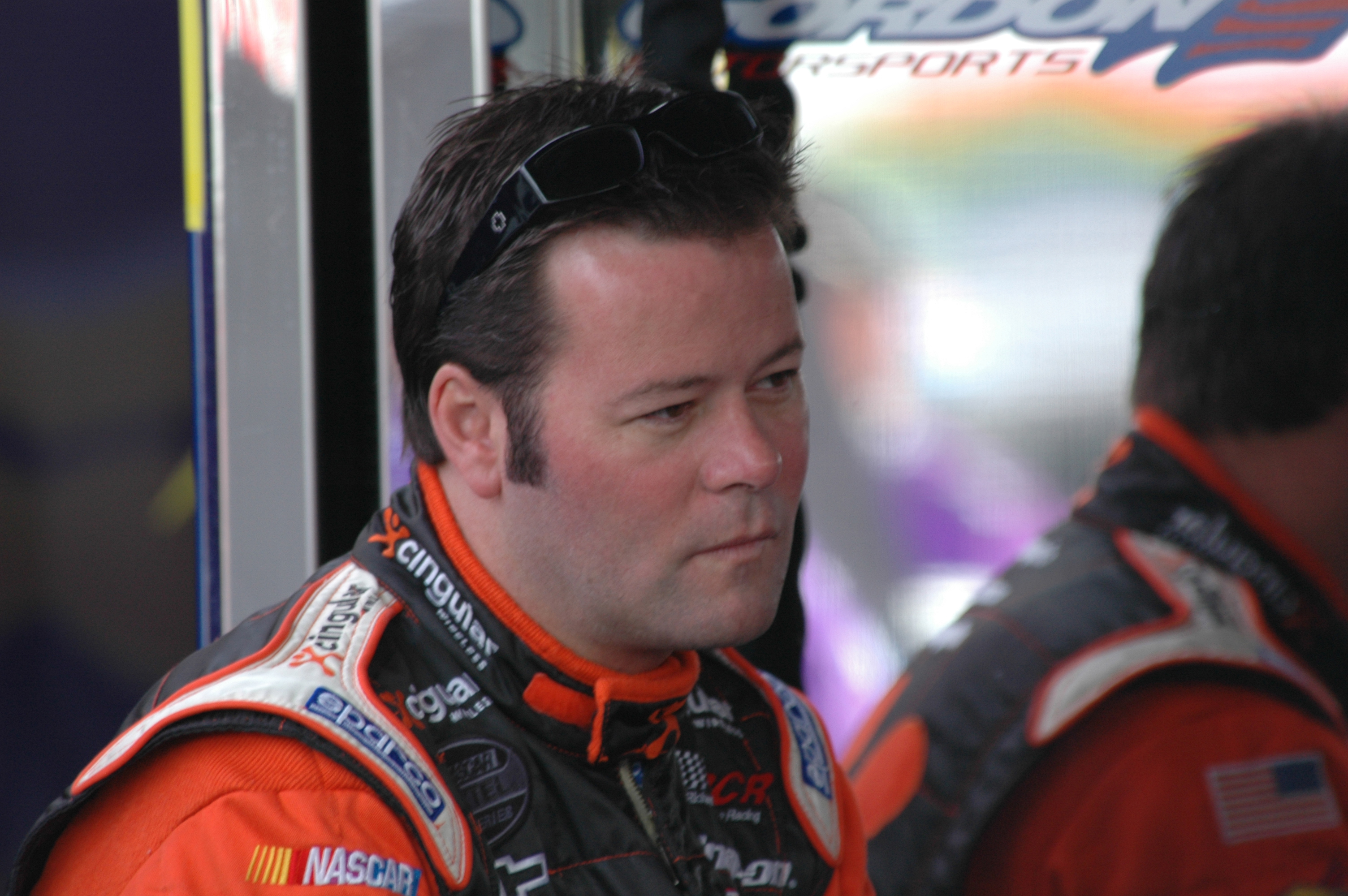
Robby Gordon wearing a dark gray on black subdued Nextel patch when he was sponsored by Cingular when racing for Richard Childress Racing in 2004; Gordon was eventually required to wear full color Nextel Cup logo

Though NASCAR typically promotes competition between multiple brands, including those that sponsor the sport and individual races, the sanctioning body provides exclusive protection to its series title sponsors (currently O'Reilly Auto Parts in the second national series and Stanley Black & Decker under its Craftsman brand for the Truck Series), as well as current fuel supplier Sunoco. This policy, known as the Viceroy Rule, prevents sponsorship from direct competitors within a certain series, although it does not prevent a company from moving to a different series within the sport, or advertising a product that does not directly conflict with the title sponsor. For example, Royal Dutch Shell, Texaco and other oil companies have been allowed to promote their motor oil brands (Pennzoil and Havoline respectively) but not their gasoline products. When a new title sponsor creates conflicts with existing team sponsors, NASCAR typically allows the team sponsors to remain under a grandfather clause. The rule is named after the British cigarette brand Viceroy, and is in reference to the 1972 USAC Championship Car season during which title sponsor Marlboro renounced its branding when Viceroy entered the sport to sponsor entries.

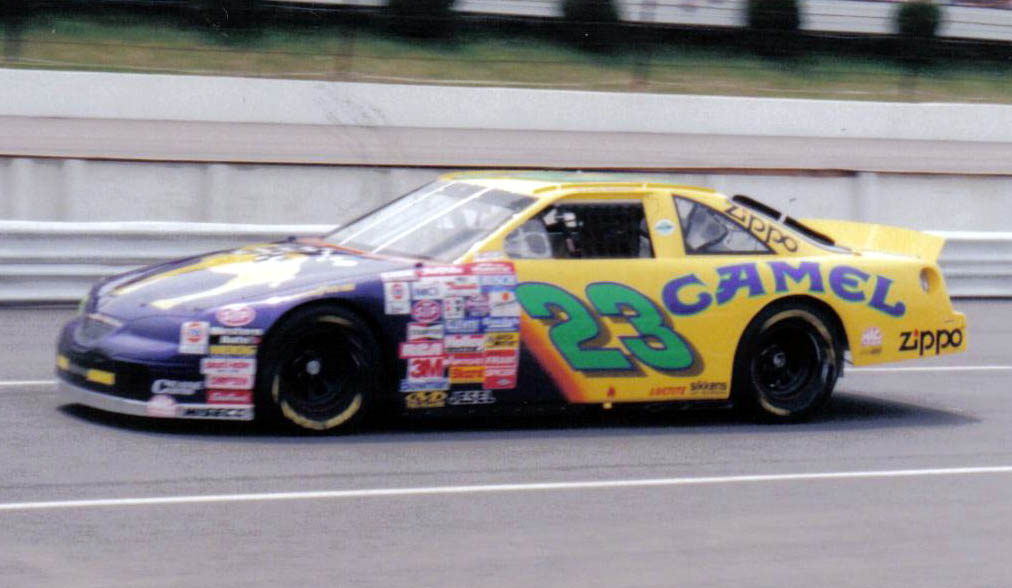
From 1994 to 1997, Camel was allowed to sponsor No. 23 of the Travis Carter Enterprises as it was a sister brand to Winston, the then title sponsor of the Cup Series.

The rule has come into effect on several occasions, most notably when Nextel signed a ten-year $700 million deal to replace Winston as the Cup Series sponsor. Active sponsors Cingular Wireless (sponsoring Richard Childress Racing's No. 31 team) and Alltel (sponsoring Team Penske's No. 12 car of Ryan Newman) were allowed to continue their deals, but both sponsor agreements were put into question when the companies were purchased and sought re-branding. In 2004, Robby Gordon was required to wear a full color Nextel patch on his driving suit. He had worn a dark gray on black subdued Nextel patch when he was sponsored by Cingular when racing for RCR. Between 2007 and 2008, NASCAR and AT&T Mobility (the successor to Cingular) filed suits against each other, with NASCAR seeking to kick all rival telecommunications companies out of the top series. AT&T was allowed to remain in the sport until 2008 when both parties settled. Meanwhile, Verizon, after purchasing Alltel in 2008, moved its sponsorship to the Penske entries in the Xfinity Series and later the IndyCar Series, while the team ran a similar scheme in the Cup Series without Verizon branding until 2010. In a separate 2007 incident, Robby Gordon was allowed to retain his sponsorship from mobile phone manufacturer Motorola (although Nextel carried Motorola products, NASCAR blocked Gordon's sponsorship as his sponsor deal was done through Verizon) after adding logos referring to the company's "Digital Audio Players".

During the Monster Energy era, Hendrick Motorsports - which was sponsored by PepsiCo at the time, displayed their cars without the title sponsor logo. Rick Hendrick stated that his teams would display the Monster Energy logo on their cars and uniforms when required. The team exploited a loophole in the NASCAR rule book when Chase Elliott took his Mountain Dew (a sponsorship that otherwise would fall into grandfather clause, as the brand had sponsored Hendrick dating back to Sprint Cup era) No. 9 to victory lane at Kansas in 2018. His car had the Monster Energy logo on the left side, as the rule book did not clearly state whether it should be on the left side or both sides.

The Viceroy Rule, however, does allow for a competing brand of a same type of product that is manufactured, or whose trademarks are owned, by the same company as the title sponsor. An instance of this occurred between 1994 and 1997, when Travis Carter Enterprises No. 23 (mostly driven by Jimmy Spencer) featured sponsorship from Camel; at the time, both Camel and Winston were brands owned by R. J. Reynolds Tobacco Company. For 1998, the team did switch its primary sponsorship to the Winston brand, coincidentally due to the one-brand rule imposed by the Tobacco Master Settlement Agreement that went in effect that year.

When NASCAR changed the Cup Series sponsorship in 2020 to a new package that includes Busch, Coca-Cola, GEICO, and Xfinity, the Viceroy Rule was lifted to allow competing brands to sponsor Cup cars. The rule is still in effect in lower series with O'Reilly Auto Parts (for the second national series) and Stanley Black & Decker (for the Truck Series), as well as for fuel sponsors in all top three series.

== Special rules for combination races ==
A combination race is a race run between multiple series that operate under compatible rules packages. During NASCAR's combination races (currently the ARCA Menards Series East and West, and formerly the Winston Cup Series/Winston West Series and Busch Series/Busch North Series), there is one race, but points are scored for both series. In previous years, drivers were given points based on how they finished among competitors from the same series. For 2017, drivers will receive points in their series based on their actual finish in the race among all competitors. However, drivers who declare they are running for a championship in both series (East & West) will be awarded points in both series, provided they have the appropriate license for both.

Special rules apply as two teams will have the same number. The fastest lap time in qualifying determines which team will have the number for the race, and which team must temporarily change the number for the race. For example, during the 1991 Busch Series season, there were selected races in the Northeast (Loudon, Nazareth, Dover, Oxford) where both the Busch Grand National and Busch Grand National North Series raced in combination races. North team Ricky Craven (also drove his car) and Grand National team Don Beverly Racing (Jimmy Hensley driving) both used No. 25. Whoever had the faster qualifying time in each race used No. 25. Craven used No. 28 at Oxford when Hensley had the faster time, while Hensley used No. 5 when Craven had the faster time at Loudon. Both teams, however, scored respective owner points for the No. 25 in their respective series.

== Car and driver changes ==
Teams must use a single car from the start of the first practice session through the end of the race. Teams that crash a car in practice or qualifying may go to a backup car, but racing a different car from the one that passes the initial inspection results in that car having to start at the rear of the field. For consecutive NOAPS races at Fontana and Las Vegas in 2022, the car that is used for the practice session at Fontana must be used for the Las Vegas race.

Engine and transmission changes are prohibited during a race weekend. Cup Series teams are restricted to 18 engines in a season, which generally results in an allocation of two races per engine, although teams may reuse engines for a third race in certain circumstances (primarily short tracks, or if a race is weather-shortened). Each race engine must be sealed with NASCAR-approved tamper-resistant devices before being used in a race for the first time and must thereafter remain sealed until retired from service (in order to prevent team's from rebuilding or modifying engines to subvert the engine allocation rules). Restrictions further limit how teams may deploy their 18 engines throughout the season. Engines will be reserved for use based on circuit size (an Atlanta engine can be reused only at that circuit or also Daytona or Talladega). Under the 2026 rules the three classes of engines are road courses and ovals up to Darlington, the second group is ovals over 1.5 miles and banked no higher than 25 degrees, and the third group is ovals over 1.5 miles and banked 28 degrees or higher). Teams may not use a new engine in the final race of the season or either non-championship round (Cup). A part-time team as may use a previously used engine from an established team. Changing either, or using an excess engine, will result in starting in the rear of the field.

Driver changes are permitted, however starting the race with a different driver than who qualified the car will result in the car starting at the rear of the field. Driver changes during the race are permitted as well, performed during pit stops, but a team must incur any loss in position due to time spent swapping drivers. The driver who starts the race earns all the points, statistics, and purse money. If a driver change occurs during a red flag, the car must start at the rear of the field for the ensuing restart. In the event of a mid-race driver change NASCAR awards the race finish, driver points, and earnings to the driver who started the race, regardless of when the driver change occurs during the race.

== Caution flag and restart procedure ==
When the yellow flag is displayed and the yellow caution lights around the track come on, the field is frozen immediately at the moment of caution. All scoring ends immediately and cars are to slow to pace vehicle speed. Cars will line up behind the pace vehicle in the order in which they passed the last scoring loop on track (there are as many as 18 loops around the track, although the one at the start/finish line is the only one that counts for official race statistics). The exception to this rule is if the yellow flag waves after the white flag is thrown, in which case NASCAR will use video evidence to determine the finishing order. Starting in 2022, following a controversial finish situation at the October 2021 Talladega Xfinity race when a safety car situation was called for a crash, and NASCAR called the race because of darkness (no lights at the circuit), the rule has since been expanded. If a safety car is called, and the race cannot be restarted, video rules on the last lap will be used to determine the finishing order.

When the caution comes out, the pit lane is immediately closed, a rule first implemented following the 1989 Motorcraft Quality Parts 500. This is shown by a flashing red light at the entrance to pit road. Entering pit road when it is closed (with certain exceptions) is a penalty of restarting at the rear of the field. When pit road is open, a steady green light will appear at the entrance to pit road, and a green light will come on in the rear window of the pace vehicle.

During a "quickie yellow" all cars may enter pit road the first time by when it is opened. After the pit stops, the beneficiary (first car one lap down at the moment of caution) is permitted to go around the pace car and start the race at the rear of the field, but back on the lead lap.

During a full yellow, only lead lap cars may pit the first time by the pit road. Once the lead lap cars who have decided to pit have entered pit road, the beneficiary will be sent around the pace car to earn their lap back. The next time by, all cars (including the free pass car) may pit.

Cars may pit as often as they wish at the expense of track position, but the beneficiary is limited to taking fuel only at the first pit stop opportunity. If the beneficiary is judged to have caused the caution (intentionally or not), it will be revoked, and no beneficiary will be awarded. If the car that would have been the beneficiary caused the caution and was passed as the caution was signaled, the car that passed him would be the beneficiary.

At the one to go signal, or at a marked point on road courses, the pace car will turn its lights off. At this point, any car that is ahead of the leader of the race will be waved around to the rear of the field. These cars are not permitted to pit until after the green flag comes back out and the race has resumed. The field will then line up double file for the restart. The restart order is always this: Lead Lap Cars > Lapped Cars > Beneficiary > Wave Arounds > Cars who have received a penalty.

Once the pace car has pulled into the pits, there is a restart "zone" consisting of lines painted on the outside wall of the track. The leader of the race is to begin accelerating inside this zone to resume the race. If they do not, the chief starter controls the restart. The second place car may not be ahead of the leader at the moment of green flag, however either car on the front row may cross the start/finish line first. Passing is not permitted until the leader of the race crosses the start-finish line. Lane changes are also not permitted until after a car clears the finish line.

Per the NASCAR rule book, a restart is official once the legal lead car crosses the start/finish line. If the green flag is waved, but NASCAR calls off the restart because of an incident before the leader crosses the start/finish line, the restart is deemed aborted.

In 2020, during the All-Star Race, the "choose cone" procedure, often used in local short track races, was tested. Rather than only the leader being given lane choice, all drivers are given the choice of what lane they chose to start in. Drivers can either start in the preferred lane and retain their current track position or take a gamble by taking the restart with better track position at the expense of starting in the worse lane. The rule was popular with drivers and fans and was officially implemented following the Michigan doubleheader.

As of 2023, the "choose rule" for restarts is used for all races; the rule was introduced for the "plate" races of Daytona, Talladega, and Atlanta and later to road courses in 2023.

== Flags ==
Like most other sanctioning bodies, NASCAR will use flags to provide the drivers with information regarding track conditions. NASCAR, not adhering to the FIA rules (despite NASCAR being a member club of ACCUS, the U.S. motor racing sporting authority and representative to the FIA World Motor Sport Council), does not use the flag system outlined in the FIA International Sporting Code. Major differences include that in NASCAR (and other championships in North America) the white flag is used to signal that the leader is on the last lap, in FIA ISC regulated events (such as Formula One and most European championships) it is used to signal that a slower car is on track. Also, the blue flag specified in the FIA ISC does not have a diagonal stripe, and the black flag means that a driver is disqualified.

Flag	Description
Green Flag	The green flag indicates that the race has started or restarted. It is shown by the official in the flag stand when the leader enters the designated restart zone, which is located a short distance before the start/finish line.
Green and White Checkered Flag	The green and white checkered flag is shown to indicate the end of a race stage. After the top 10 drivers cross the start/finish line, the caution flag is displayed).
Yellow Flag	The yellow flag, or caution flag, indicates a hazard on the track — most often an accident, but sometimes also for debris, light rain, emergency vehicles entering (usually on short tracks with no tunnel) or a scheduled competition caution (usually used for races that have been postponed due to inclement weather). All cars must slow down and follow the pace car. Passing is not allowed under the yellow flag. NASCAR experimented the "local yellow" flag in road courses; cautions apply to the entire circuit, including road courses.
Red Flag	The red flag indicates that the race has been stopped. This may happen due to a large accident (such as a multi-car wreck like The Big One), inclement weather, track repair (such as damaged catch fencing), or for severe track cleaning (such as the final laps, when NASCAR may clean the entire track to ensure the race can finish under green flag conditions, and to do so with the track clean of oil from engine failure or crashes). Cars may be ordered into the pits or on the track depending on conditions; red flags for inclement weather generally result in all cars parking in the pits. Race teams are not permitted to repair or adjust cars during red flag conditions. However, drivers may exit their cars, and they may be provided with water, food, or other necessities. In some races, like the All-Star Race, a red flag is used to indicate a predetermined pause in the race. This flag is also used with the black flag to signal the end of a practice or qualifying session.
White Flag	The white flag indicates one lap remaining in the race. More specifically, it indicates that all drivers will be scored for at most 1 more lap after passing the white flag.
Checkered Flag	The checkered flag indicates that the race is over.
Black Flag	The black flag indicates that a driver must pit immediately. This flag is shown if the driver or pit crew violates a rule (e.g., speeding through the pits), if the vehicle has sufficient mechanical damage that it is a hazard to other drivers, if the vehicle cannot maintain the minimum required speed (varies by track; typically disclosed in the pre-race drivers' meeting), or if a driver has been driving overly aggressive. In the event of a failure of the in-car radio, NASCAR will, at the team's request, display the black flag to signal a driver to pit, one time only.
Black Flag with a White Cross	The black flag with a white cross indicates that a driver is no longer being scored. This is normally shown if a driver does not respond to a black flag within three laps. Usage of this flag is extremely rare, as many lines of radio communication are immediately sent to the driver notifying them they have to complete a penalty. It may also be used in circumstances where NASCAR has decided to park the driver for offenses that exceed the disciplinary abilities of an in-race penalty.
Blue Flag with a Yellow Stripe	The blue flag with a yellow stripe is shown to warn slow drivers of faster cars approaching. NASCAR rarely black-flags drivers for not obeying this flag. NASCAR uses the yellow diagonal stripe on the blue flag because the flag is usually displayed on top of the starter's stand, and not at eye-level to the driver from the track.
Blue Flag	The blue flag is used to indicate an area on a road course where drivers should be careful due to slow or stopped cars or a partially blocked track. It is not used on ovals. If a full-course caution is required, NASCAR will use the yellow flag to indicate this. Unlike the local caution commonly used in other racing series, the blue flag is not a "local caution" and does not prohibit overtaking; rather, it merely tells drivers to be careful. Safety workers will not leave their designated spots and enter the track under this flag. In the wake of a fatal corner worker crash at Daytona International Speedway in 2004 in a non-NASCAR sanctioned race (but using track workers), NASCAR has become reluctant in recent years to use local cautions, opting to use the full-course yellow caution flag instead if any safety team members have to approach the track in an attempt to give safety workers a safer environment to inspect debris by forcing all cars under pace car speed, instead of race speed, to remove debris. The rationale is most of the field will be packed together while cleanup is happening, instead of being spread over the entire track.

== Qualifying procedure ==
=== Standard procedure ===
Single-car qualifying has been used for most of the sport's history other than a five-year span between 2014 and early 2019 where a knockout system similar to Formula One was used. NASCAR returned to single-car qualifying at ovals in all three national series in May 2019 at the Dover spring race.

At ovals longer than 1.022 miles (tracks longer than Phoenix), the starting line up will be determined by a single timed lap. At tracks 1.00 miles and shorter (tracks shorter than Dover), the better of two timed laps will set the starting lineup. At road courses, group qualifying is still used.

Starting with the 2022 season, a two-round system will be used. For all ovals, teams are split into groups based on the previous race performance. Aside from some races (the first and last races of the season, races in which new rules are being used, and restrictor plate races), teams are given a 20-minute practice session in each group. For those races, there is one 50-minute free practice session. There is no practice allowed at the second Daytona race or either Talladega race, although NASCAR may make exceptions if numerous drivers without enough superspeedway experience are entered (especially in the October races at Talladega) or if NASCAR needs to test changes to cars (such as reduced power, spoilers, and other adjustments).

Each qualifying group will take one timed lap (longer than 1.022 miles) or two laps (shorter circuits), with the top five in each group advancing to the final round. At Daytona and Talladega, the top ten overall advance to the final round. The same procedure applies in the pole round.

=== Road Courses ===
On road courses, there will be a 25-minute practice session for each group unless it is raining, when it is a single 50-minute session for all cars. Each group receives twenty minutes, or if there is inclement weather, one single 50-minute session to set the fastest time. The start-finish line is not the line that counts. Instead, a timing loop placed considerably ahead of the pit entrance is marked as the official line to start and finish a lap, similar to INDYCAR. For Austin, it is at the exit of Istanbul 8. At Sonoma it is Turn 9, at Watkins Glen it is the exit of Turn 9, and at Charlotte it is through Turn 13 (past the exit of the backstretch chicane). If a driver starts his lap before time expires, his lap can count.

The timing line rule is used also at ovals races with their standard qualifying. For Pocono, it is the exit of Turn 2, and at Indianapolis it is the exit of Turn 3.

=== Daytona 500 provisions ===
The session results from single car qualifying set the starting lineups for the Duel at Daytona races on Thursday. The duel races are two 60 lap/150 mile races. The first race consists of those who finished qualifying in odd-numbered positions and sets the lineup for odd-numbered positions in the 500. The second race does the same for even-numbered positions. However, there must be an equal number of "open" or "non-chartered" teams in each Duel race. After the Duel races, the lineup is set as follows:

- Positions 1–2: Fastest two qualifiers in Sunday's single car qualifying.
- Positions 3–38: Duel race results, consisting of all chartered teams and the highest finishing non-chartered team in each Duel.
- Positions 39-40: The fastest two cars of non-chartered teams that are not already qualified, based on Sunday's qualifying session.

=== Provisional rule ===
The two lower NASCAR national series will set a specific number of starting positions by timed laps and have a specific number of starting positions based on owner points of vehicles that have not already qualified.

- O’Reilly Auto Parts Series: 33 / 4 / 1
- Truck Series (except Bristol Dirt and Knoxville): 27 / 4 / 1

In the O’Reilly Auto Parts Series, four positions are awarded based on owner points to cars not already qualified. In the Camping World Truck Series, four positions are awarded based on owner points to trucks not already qualified.

The final position in the O’Reilly Auto Parts Series and Craftsman Truck Series is reserved for a past series champion. Each past champion can use this past champions' provisional up to six times per season. If the past champions' provisional is not needed, then the position goes to the first team in owner points not already qualified for the race. If a former champion driver's team is one of the top six or four teams, respectively, highest in owner points, not already qualified, then that does not count against usage of the provisional. If there are 38 or less (or 32 or less) vehicles entered in the respective races, no provisionals are charged and the field will be determined by timed laps only.

After these positions are awarded, the cars are arranged by lap times.

==== Past champion's / winners provisional ====
In 1991, NASCAR introduced the past champion's provisional (sometimes known as the "Petty rule") after Richard Petty failed to qualify in four races in 1989, which resulted in a viewership ratings drop that season. This special provisional allowed a former Cup champion to claim the final starting position if he was too low in the points standings and was unable to qualify by speed. The past champion's provisional worked perfectly until 1997, when Darrell Waltrip failed to make the UAW-GM Quality 500 lineup because Terry Labonte was the more recent champion and was higher in points and did not use the regular provisional entitled to the Hendrick No. 5 car in owner points (which was one of the revisions in 1998 that provisionals for team owner points are assigned first). When Waltrip used the past champion's provisional to enter 20 of the 33 races in 1998, NASCAR set the limit for past champions to a total of eight total provisionals in 1999. As a result, Waltrip missed seven races after exhausting his provisionals that season.

In 2004, NASCAR gave past Cup champions a maximum of 10 past champion's provisionals per season; this number was reduced to six in 2007. This proved disastrous for Dale Jarrett in 2007, as he moved to a fledgling Michael Waltrip Racing with no owner points and failed to qualify in 12 races after being forced to use all of his past champion's provisionals at the start of the season. In 2013, NASCAR once again revised the past champion's provisional rule, allowing past champions only one every six races; this meant that the drivers needed to qualify in the succeeding six races to earn their next provisional.

In Cup only, the past champion's provisional was discontinued from the Cup Series as part of the new Charter system and qualifying system in 2016. The rule remains in effect in the O’Reilly Auto Parts and Truck Series.

In 2022, NASCAR revised the past champion's provisional in the O’Reilly Auto Parts Series. The provisional can only be used by former champions in that series in the past ten years and the driver declare for points in the O’Reilly Auto Parts Series. If that provisional is not needed, then the highest-placed car in the series standings that is driven by a driver who won a race in the previous or current season will take the past champion's provisional.

=== Open Exemption Provisional ===
In 2025, NASCAR added the Open Exemption Provisional to the Cup Series, guaranteeing a starting position for world-class drivers in a Cup race. A race team must request the provisional at least 90 days before an event. Approval will be determined on a case-by-case basis, with a strong emphasis on the team's prior racing resume. Full-time NASCAR drivers are not eligible.

When the OEP is used, the driver and car owner will not be eligible for race points, playoff points, prize money, or any tiebreaker benefits related to their finishing position. If a provisional car wins a race or stage, it will receive credit for the win, including the trophy and All-Star eligibility. However, the finish will not count toward playoff eligibility. In this case, the second-place finisher will inherit first-place points but will not receive playoff points or playoff eligibility. For non-OEP cars, prize money, race points, and stage points (excluding playoff points) will be adjusted upward by one position, starting from the finishing position of the OEP car and continuing through the rest of the field.

In March 2025 the rules of the provisional were changed to that if there are there are more than 40 entries, then the race field will automatically expand to 41 entries and the team requesting the provisional must use it regardless of where it qualifies. In addition, a line was added to the rulebook stating that NASCAR has full discretion to deem certain races ineligible for the provisional.

On July 21, 2025, the OEP was updated to give NASCAR the authority to cap the field at 40 cars. The revision also established owner points as the qualifying metric for non-chartered teams, replacing single-lap speed, when more than 40 cars attempt to enter. A maximum of six non-chartered teams can qualify under this system.

=== International Provisionals ===
On May 27, 2025, NASCAR announced that the starting field for the NASCAR Xfinity Series event at Autódromo Hermanos Rodríguez in Mexico City, Mexico, will be expanded. Traditionally limited to 38 drivers, the field will now include 40 entries with the introduction of International Provisionals (IP). Similar to the Open Exemption Provisional (OEP) in the Cup Series, drivers or teams using an International Provisional will not receive the benefits of their finishing position. If an driver running under an International Provisional finishes inside the top 10 during one of the race’s first two stages, the points typically awarded for that position will be passed on to the next eligible driver. The same is done when the checkered flag flies.

=== All-Star Weekend qualifying ===
The Open uses the standard procedure, but with only 8 cars advancing to the final round. All-Star race qualifying consists of the combined time of 3 laps with a 4-tire pit stop. The fastest 5 drivers in the opening round advance to the final round.

=== Dirt Tracks ===
All dirt races use a unique qualifying format. Each vehicle will take two timed laps, with the faster lap counting as its official time. Vehicles are assigned to one of five heat races where the top five cars from each will advance to the feature. Those that fail to qualify will have one last chance race, where the top two cars will also advance. Provisionals will be determined after the last chance race.

The 2021 NASCAR Cup Series and Truck Series dirt races at Bristol Motor Speedway will use a format similar to selected dirt track races, such as the Bryan Clauson Classic at Indianapolis or the Lucas Oil Chili Bowl Midget Nationals using heat races and random draws.

1. Four 15 lap qualifying heats where the lineup is set by random draw.
2. Drivers earn points based on finishing position (1st place gets 10 points, 2nd gets 9, etc.) and passing points (1 point for every position gained beyond their starting position). These points do not count towards championship standings.
3. The driver with the highest number of points gets pole in the feature race. Ties are broken by owner points standings.

=== Pandemic Formula (August 2020, used if qualifying cancelled; Practice Groups and Qualifying Order since 2022) ===
Following the postponement of races due to the 2020 global pandemic, NASCAR implemented a new "metric qualifying" format beginning at the Daytona Road Course race. Using a mathematical formula, the starting order would be set using the following metrics:

1. Ranking in team owner points (weighted 35%)
2. Driver's finishing position in the previous race (weighted 25%)
3. Team owner's position from previous race (weighted 25%)
4. Fastest lap in previous race (weighted 15%)

Starting in 2021, NASCAR began to use the formula as fallback in case qualifying cannot be held, as was used in the Bristol dirt race when qualifying was cancelled as a result of inclement weather. In 2022, NASCAR added practice and qualifying group determination to be based on the pandemic formula.

== Penalties ==
The following is a list of NASCAR penalties. Penalties listed as "NASCAR Discretion" can result in a simple restart at the tail of the field, a multiple lap penalty, or disqualification.

=== Restarting at the End of the Line for the Ensuing Restart ===
1. Pitting before pit road is open (Section 10-4B), administered if a driver enters pit road while the flashing lights indicating pit road is closed are on (certain exceptions apply sometimes)
2. Pitting out of order (10-4B)

=== Restarting at the End of the Line (caution) or Drive-Through Penalty (green flag) ===
1. Car/truck must enter pit road in single file (9-15C)
2. Speeding while entering or exiting pit road (9-15D)
3. Passing on pit road from the inside on entry (9-15C)
4. Driving through more than three pit boxes to enter their pit stall (9-15C).
5. Crew member(s) over the wall too soon (9-15E)
6. Lollipop extension poles are limited, or in night races, the lollipop is not self illuminated (9-15G))
7. Crew members returning from the equipment side of the wall (9-15H), not carrying the front air wrench back to the pit wall side of the car/truck (9-15J),
8. Using more than two air wrenches during one pit stop (9-15J)
9. Non-compliant refueling
10. Tossing or throwing the fuel filler/equipment (9-15M)
11. Rolling a tire(s) beyond the center of pit road (9-15P)
12. Hand pushing the car/truck more than 3 pit boxes to restart it (9-15Q)
13. Going above the blend line exiting the pits (9-11) (except when safety vehicle requests such happens during pit stops during cautions).
14. Car making entrance to pit road after crossing plane of pit entrance line or cone on track side (not pit side)(9-15B).
  1. If the car is entering pit road to avoid an incident and has to cross the plane of road line track side, then enter pit road, no penalty.
  2. At Martinsville Speedway, the car must have two wheels cross the pit entrance line before the Turn 3 pit entrance.
15. Exceeding pit delta during pit stops (standalone races).

=== Stop and Go Penalty ===
1. Removing equipment from assigned pit area (9-15O).
2. Speeding on pit road during pass-through penalty (9-15R).
3. Track limits (road courses, not on pit lane):
  1. At Watkins Glen: Stop and Go, skipping the Chicane.
  2. At Charlotte: Stop at exit of final chicane or stop while skipping either chicane.
  3. At Austin: Stop in Long Lap Penalty area.

=== Pass-Through Penalty ===
1. Jumping any green flag (10-2A)
2. Passing after specific point on the "One to Go" signal (Turn 3 of most ovals, Turn 2 at Pocono, Turn 10 at Sonoma or Watkins Glen) (9-11)
3. Passing on a start or restart (before start/finish line) (9-11)
4. Illegal Lane Change on restart (9-11)
5. Unapproved mechanical adjustment (flaring of rocker panels most notably) (10-7-1-1).
  1. Penalty only under yellow condition, enforced on the second lap following a restart, in addition to starting at the tail end of the field for that restart. Under green condition, NASCAR will not allow the car on the track until the car is repaired legally.
6. Failure to make qualifying attempt because of numerous failed pre-race technical inspections.
  1. Two failed inspection attempts involve ejection of crew member (no pass-through penalty).
  2. Three failed inspection attempts also involves pass-through penalty and disqualification from qualifying.
  3. Four failed inspection attempts also involves a ten-point penalty.
7. Track limits (ovals, and also if the driver fails to stop at assigned penalty point on road courses)

=== One Lap Penalty ===
1. Car/truck pitting out of the assigned pit box (9-15F) (NASCAR may relax the rule at tracks with shorter pit boxes)
2. Passing the safety car (10-4D) (except for cars being subjected to the wave-around, or at some tracks where the radius of pit road is shorter than track, as in Martinsville and Bristol, where the pit road speed limit applies, and the safety car may be passed.)
3. Pulling up to pit (9-15A) -- (drivers must maintain position in relation to field or face penalty, again rule differs at Martinsville and Bristol)
4. Refueling car before race start OR when before the designated race distance, as in a competition caution called because of weather, passes (9-6D and 9-6E). Additional laps may be added to penalty.

=== Penalties assessed at NASCAR's discretion ===
1. Running over/under equipment (9-15O)
2. Running the stop and go sign/light (10-4C) (must be blatant; crossing the plane of the line or pole but stopping is not a penalty)
3. Disobeying NASCAR request (9-11)
4. Intentionally causing a caution (9-11)
5. Verbal abuse to a NASCAR official (9-11)
6. Disobeying black flag (10-6A)
7. Safety violation

NASCAR conducts a complete technical inspection prior to the first practice session, before and after qualifying, and before the race. A quick safety inspection is also completed prior to each practice session after the first. Penalties for car violations are typically announced the Wednesday after a race, and can range from a simple fine to a suspension (typically a maximum of 12 races) and loss of points. After a race, the top 5 finishers, one other random car, and the first car failing to finish the race not due to an accident will have their cars inspected. Podium cars, a random car, and first car out also have their cars and engines taken by NASCAR for further inspection at the NASCAR Research and Development Center. Further, there are random races per year where NASCAR confiscates vehicles (including engines and chassis) and takes them to NASCAR's Research and Development Center for evaluation, comparison, and to help decide on future rule changes, or Balance of performance changes (NASCAR's center is also used for IMSA and ACCUS/FIA evaluation of BoP).

Starting in 2017, NASCAR will attempt to issue more penalties during a race weekend instead of waiting until Wednesday. There will now be L1 and L2 penalties, with a third level, L3, added for Cup Series' Next Gen cars in 2022:

- L1 penalties concern areas of minimum heights and weights, the Laser Inspection Station (LIS), gear ratios, 18 or 19 tightened lug nuts (Xfinity or Truck) or minor under-torque violations (Cup with center-lock hub), or used engine violations. Penalties will be a 10-40 point deduction, suspension for 1-3 races, plus a fine up to $75,000.
- L2 penalties involve more egregious infractions concerning tampering with the three "no man's land" technical areas of tires, engine and fuel, as well as single-supplier parts for Cup's Next Gen car. Major safety violations, the use of telemetry or traction control, plus breaches of the testing policy also fall under the L2 designation. These penalties will be a 75-point deduction, a 4-6 race suspension, and a fine up to $200,000.
- L3 penalties are reserved for more severe cases of tampering of single-supplier Next Gen parts, including the counterfeiting of them. In addition to higher points deduction, race suspensions, and fines, L3 penalties can result in said team being banned from that season's NASCAR playoffs.
- Disqualification: Starting in 2019, a car failing post-race inspection will be disqualified and credited with a last place finish. Teams may also be disqualified for lug nuts that are moderately under-torqued (Cup) or 17 or fewer lug nuts firmly attached to vehicle. This can result in a win being taken away if the winner fails post-race inspection. During the 2020 Coca-Cola 600, Jimmie Johnson was disqualified that way, and eventually cost him a playoff position. At the 2021 Ally 400, Chase Elliott was disqualified for four loose lug nuts. At the 2022 M&M's Fan Appreciation 400, Denny Hamlin and Kyle Busch, who finished 1–2 in that race, were both disqualified for tape infringement; Hamlin became the first Cup winner to be disqualified under the current disqualification rules. The last time a driver was disqualified before 2019 was Buddy Baker in 1973 and Bobby Hillin Jr. in 1992.
- The list of pre-race penalties within a race weekend at the series directors' disposal, in order of increasing severity: Loss of annual "hard card" credential, loss of practice time, loss of pit selection position, tail of the field penalty, a green-flag pass-through on pit road after the initial start, a green-flag stop-and-go in the pits after the start, and lap(s) penalty.

As a member of ACCUS/FIA, NASCAR enforces the FIA's substance abuse policy requiring random testing of drivers, crew members, and officials. Those who have violated the policy (including suspensions for domestic violence or other criminal charges, as well as any discriminatory remarks or behavior) are suspended indefinitely immediately and given the opportunity to enroll in NASCAR's Road to Recovery program to be re-instated into NASCAR. Those who were repeatedly suspended may be banned from the sport permanently, such as in the case of Shane Hmiel who failed three drug tests, although he was able to participate in other ACCUS/FIA-sanctioned competition after a suspension.

On January 28, 2019, NASCAR unveiled its new Sports Betting Policy, which prohibits team owners, drivers, crew members and series officials from gambling on NASCAR or disclosing confidential information that could enable or facilitate betting on NASCAR events. Offenders could face fines of up to $200,000 as well as indefinite suspension or termination. NASCAR will continue to permit members to take part in fantasy sports provided the prize value is under $250. The new policy was in reaction to the May 2018 Supreme Court of the United States ruling that struck down the Professional and Amateur Sports Protection Act of 1992, which allowed US states to authorize legal wagering.

== Pit road ==
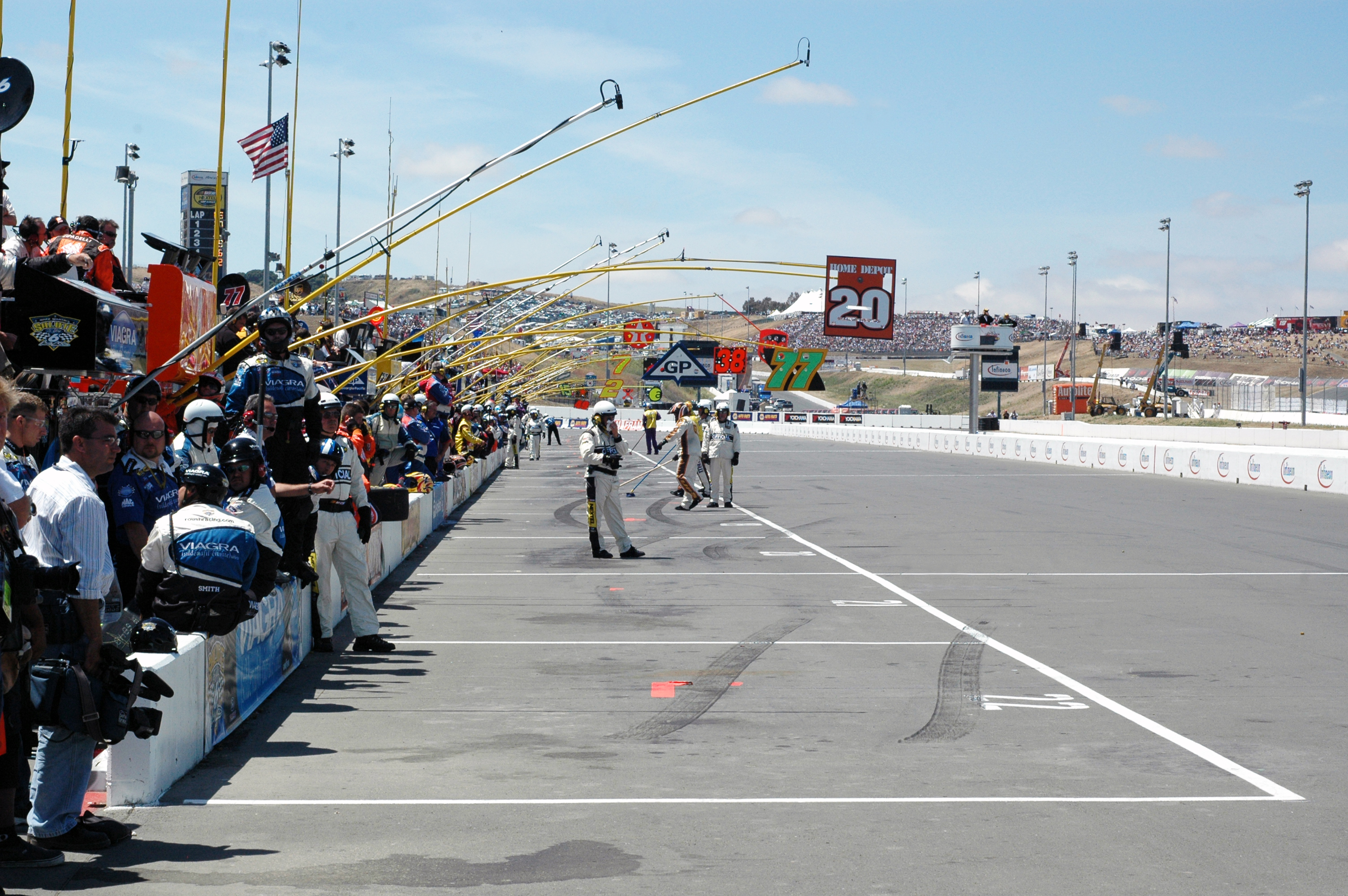
NASCAR officials on pit road at Sonoma Raceway

During a race, teams must pit several times for refueling and new tires. Teams are permitted five crew members over the wall at the start of the race; that consists of two tire changers, one tire carrier, a jackman, and a gas man. Once NASCAR gives the OK (usually once the leader begins lapping cars), a 6th crew member is permitted only to service the driver/windshield. With the 2018 NASCAR rule changes, the gas man is now not allowed to make any adjustments to the car when refueling it.

There is an established pit road speed limit for each race. Since NASCAR cars do not have speedometers, the first pace lap of each race is run at pit road speed so drivers can get a tachometer reading for pit speed. There are a variety of other safety rules (see penalties above) that must be followed.

At the moment of caution or when there are two laps to go in the stage, pit road is immediately closed. NASCAR uses both a light at the end of pit road and a series of cameras to help determine the moment pit road is closed. The pits are opened once the field is under control of the pace/safety car unless there is an accident near the entrance/exit or on pit road, in which case the pits will remain closed until NASCAR deems the pits are safe to open.

After an incident at the June 2015 Chicagoland O’Reilly Auto Parts Series race where the pit flagman waved a green flag but the light at the end of pit road was red, NASCAR added a light to the rear of the pace/safety car to help inform drivers and teams when pit road will be open, and thus removed the flagman from the entrance of pit road. NASCAR's official policy is that in the event of a discrepancy, the light at the end of pit road is official.

Cars sustaining accident damage that cannot be repaired on pit road within seven minutes will be taken behind the wall to the garage where it can be repaired and put back out on track where it has three laps to meet minimum speed. At road courses and short ovals, if rain tires are used, the minimum speed will be adjusted.

== Crew rosters ==
For the 2018 season, NASCAR created a new roster system. This system would standardize the number of at-track team members. Rosters are split into three categories: Organizational, Road Crew, and Pit Crew.

Examples of Organizational roster spots include competition director, team managers, technical director, and IT specialists. In the Cup Series, teams are allotted three organizational roster spots for one- and two-car operations, and four spots for three- and four-car outfits. O’Reilly Auto Parts Series and Craftsman Truck Series teams are allowed one organizational roster spot each.

Examples of Road Crew include crew chief, car chief, mechanics, engine tuners, engineers, specialists (for areas such as tires, aerodynamics and shocks) and spotters. The limits for these personnel by series: Cup, 12; O’Reilly Auto Parts, 7; Trucks, 6.

Pit Crews are the same in all series, with the maximum number being 5. At standalone races (Lime Rock, Portland), pit crew members are not allowed. Members of a team's standard crew roster must participate in pit stops.

At Indianapolis and road courses, extra crew roster members are permitted, primarily because of restricted views with spotters. Also, an additional road crew roster spot will be allowed for O’Reilly Auto Parts Series teams at 10 races (Indianapolis and road courses among those) and Truck Series teams at five (primarily road courses). Normally one extra member is permitted, but road courses may have additional spotters available at NASCAR's discretion if necessary. In addition, exemptions are used for longer-distance travel races (races west of the Mississippi River or Mexico) where both hauler drivers are exempt from crew roster lists.

== Race procedure ==
Starting in 2017, NASCAR announced they may reserve the right to move up the start of the race one hour to beat inclement weather (heavy rain and lightning on road courses).

Prior to 2020, NASCAR mandated drivers and crew chiefs attend a mandatory driver's meeting. Competitors are required to attend in person, and no exceptions are allowed. Failure to attend the meeting will force drivers to start at the rear of the field. In August 2015, NASCAR announced they would experiment moving the driver's meeting to only one hour before the race since meetings at most races take less than 15 minutes. In restarting the 2020 season at Darlington, the official meeting, as posted on NASCAR's weekend schedule, was changed to a video bulletin sent ti=o all competitors held typically on Thursday evening.

The traditional drivers' meeting (which is no longer the official meeting in the rules) is held one hour before the race to introduce dignitaries and add additional information that may have been added since the video bulletin was sent, such as replacement drivers, warnings to drivers about driving standards if numerous incidents took place during support races, weather procedures (including wet race declarations on short ovals and road courses) and related special procedures for them, track limit enforcement, special procedures for the race, and establishing the race time limit if necessary. At 45 minutes before start, driver introductions are conducted unless there is a lightning hold. Driver introductions may be conducted even if it is raining, but no lightning, in order to facilitate track drying efforts as drivers are driven around the circuit. Failure to attend these will also require the driver to start at the rear of the field as well.

At the designated start time, fans will be asked to stand and remove their hats as the nation's colors are presented. Afterwards, a pre-race invocation is given, followed by the singing of the national anthem. Once the anthem is complete, drivers have exactly five minutes to get in their cars with all the safety equipment fastened and ready to go. At the end of those five minutes, the grand marshal for the race will deliver the command "Drivers, start your engines!", at which point each car must start its engine. With the engines running, the cars sit on pit road for approximately three minutes before heading on the track for some warm-up laps before the pace car. The average number of pace laps is three, but there can be more or fewer depending on a wide variety of circumstances and conditions, including but not limited to track length, track drying efforts after rain, or if a car has a problem and stops on the track during those pace laps. One of these laps will feature the drivers progressing through pit lane for pit speed limit calibration. At the end of the pace laps, the field will partake in a rolling start. If necessary to facilitate track drying efforts, especially if darkness or curfew may become an issue, NASCAR may start the race with a soft green and yellow flag to start counting laps.

If the penultimate lap is run under caution at any point, the race will be extended per NASCAR Overtime unless the race reaches the time limit. Once the track is clear, the field will be given the green flag with two laps remaining. If there is another crash/caution before the leader reaches the start/finish line, then the race will continue to be extended until the leader reaches the line. However, when the leader of the race reaches the start/finish line, the next flag (caution or checkered) will end the race (although competitors are required to cross the start/finish line at pace car speed to be scored in their position at the moment of caution).

If there is a potential for inclement weather at any time or the race runs long where sunset, curfew, or logistics of the event (such as to advance to the next scheduled event of the schedule) becomes an issue, NASCAR will inform teams on race control radio of the official time limit (sunset, curfew, or set time limit to prepare for the next event) set by Section 8.5.7.6.C. If the race is not official and there is no chance to reach official status (typically second stage or halfway point), the race is stopped and resumed the next day either at the point NASCAR does not believe they can finish the race, or allow the race to be run to the time limit.

If the time limit is reached with four or more laps before official status, or when NASCAR deems the race cannot reach official status before the time limit, the yellow flag is immediately waved, with the safety car leading the field to the garage area in parc fermé regulations, with the race continuing the next day.

If the time limit is reached with less than three laps remaining (i. e., leader is past the start finish line at the time limit with three laps remaining) before official status, or has passed it, the race will conclude in two laps after the leader subsequently crosses the finish line or an ensuing safety car. At the point of the time limit, three laps will be remaining. Once the leader crosses the finish line after time expires, two laps will be remaining. When the leader crosses the finish line on the next lap, the one lap remaining indicator will be displayed to the leader. If the time limit is reached and the race is under the safety car, if NASCAR is able to restart the race on the next lap, the restart will only be one lap. If the time limit is reached under the safety car, NASCAR may end the race immediately if the race is official. This procedure began at the 2024 Grant Park 165 in Chicago.

After the race, the winning driver (and, if at the end of the season, championship winning driver) will usually complete a series of burnouts in celebration of their victory, before heading to victory lane for more celebrations and post-race interviews.

For road course races, starting in 2022, NASCAR will no longer call a safety car situation if rain is potentially an issue to allow teams to change tires and install windshield wipers. Teams can switch to rain tires at any time if they wish. In 2023, safety cars will be called on selected flat and short ovals—Loudon, Phoenix, Martinsville, North Wilkesboro (where the tires were first used during All-Star Race heat races), and Richmond. Starting in 2025, rain tires will be used at Bristol. Starting in September 2026, if a race is declared wet at the start, teams are now given free will to change from wet to dry tyres on ovals where rain tires are available. NASCAR may declare if pit road is wet and a safety car situation is called, the ensuing pit stops may be declared non-competitive (where teams do not race for position; the order the cars that pit will restart is based on running order before the safety car).

== Safety ==
Since late 2001, a head and neck restraint has been required for usage of all drivers. Since 2005 the HANS device (Head and Neck Support Device) has been the only such approved device. Since 2003, helmets have been required for pit crew members as well. Drivers and pit crew members must also wear firesuits. Drivers are required to use carbon fiber seats and headrests for strength and durability. Cars have also been redesigned since the 2001 death of Dale Earnhardt and after spectacular crashes to reflect new discoveries and developments in safety.

All oval tracks in any of NASCAR's National Series (except dirt races, such as at Eldora) use the SAFER barrier and other soft wall technology to lessen impacts.

After a series of flips and dangerous crashes in the 1980s, NASCAR began requiring all cars to run a restrictor plate at Daytona and Talladega. The restrictor plate limits air into the engine, reducing horsepower and speed at these tracks from 230-240 mph to 195-200 mph. At these races, in addition to the restrictor plate, there are a variety of other technical rules and regulations to keep the cars stable and on the track.

== Track limits ==
Restrictor plate races and road courses are the only races where NASCAR enforces track limits. At the high-speed superspeedways, track limits are marked by a double yellow line (white line at Atlanta Motor Speedway starting from 2022) separating the apron from the racing surface. Exceeding track limits to advance one's position is subject to a drive-through penalty, or if the foul occurs on the last lap that car will be relegated to the last car on the lead lap in official race results. The superspeedway track limits (often referred as the "yellow line rule") have been part of considerable criticism and controversies, such as when Regan Smith was stripped of the win at the 2008 AMP Energy 500 following a last-lap pass attempt that went below the line and controversies surrounding the finish of the 2020 YellaWood 500, with former drivers turned television coverage pundits Dale Jarrett and Dale Earnhardt Jr. (the latter being involved in a track limits controversy at the 2003 Aaron's 499) calling for the repeal of the rule.

On road courses, track limits are defined by chicanes, enforced at Watkins Glen, Daytona, and Charlotte road courses, the Turns 1-3 complex at Indianapolis, or the Maggots-Becketts-Chapel section in Austin (a driver who exceeds track limits such as driving beyond the white lines or the long lap penalty section used by MotoGP to make a pass), drivers must stop at an assigned point of the circuit or face a drive-through penalty.

== Testing ==
NASCAR previously sanctioned an annual 4-day pre-season test at Daytona International Speedway in January for all teams until 2015, when all private testing was banned. After that test, each organization was allowed four 2-day tests. Each test was required to be at a different race track. Rookie drivers were allocated an additional test. Beginning in 2016, each team is eligible to participate in five open tests that will occur at Indianapolis Motor Speedway, Watkins Glen International, Chicagoland Speedway, and Homestead-Miami Speedway.

Tire supplier Goodyear is allowed unlimited testing and chooses three teams (one per manufacturer) at every circuit. Teams will be permitted an organisational test with all teams participating when necessary.

If a driver who has been credentialed in an FIA-graded motorsport series is driving in a Cup race, he is permitted a car test at the type circuit he is to participate within three months of the race. Drivers are also permitted to participate in a refresher test when returning from an injury that requires them to miss considerable time. These tests are under severe restrictions and are designed for drivers to understand the car, or refresher if necessary.

== Weekend schedule ==
Previously, NASCAR race weekends could be as long as 4 days long with numerous practice sessions before and after qualifying prior to the race. During the COVID-19 pandemic NASCAR was forced to run race weekends behind closed doors with no practice or qualifying to minimize exposure risks between mechanics and crew members working in tight garage areas. As an unintended consequence, teams saved considerable money by running their cars less and showing up to the race weekend later in the week. The on-track racing was not impacted and in the opinion of some improved.

Following the pandemic, the NASCAR Cup Series for most races offers teams a 25 minute practice session (20 minutes from 2022-2024, expanded to 25 minutes starting in 2025). The field is split into two groups, with each group getting 25 minutes on track. Following practice the teams immediately go into qualifying. Cars are inspected prior to practice, with only limited changes allowed during practice and qualifying, before cars are impounded and not allowed to be worked on again prior to the race. The practice/qualifying session typically takes place on Saturday with the race on Sunday. On road courses and short ovals with rain tire options, if it is raining during practice, one single group may be used with qualifying one single session with all cars on the track at the same time.

Depending on the race, the number of support/other events on the weekend schedule, and broadcast requests the NASCAR O'Reilly Auto Parts Series will sometimes have their practice & qualifying sessions on Friday before a Saturday race. Otherwise those sessions are held on Saturday morning before a Saturday afternoon race for a one-day show. The NASCAR Craftsman Truck Series for Friday races uses one-day show with practice and qualifying held Friday afternoon before a Friday evening race, but for Saturday races will use a two-day format with practice and qualifying on Friday for a Saturday race. The Xfinity and Truck Series do not use the group format the Cup series does and allows all cars on track during their 25 minute practice. On occasion, both support series may share a Saturday schedule.

At superspeedway races excluding the season opening Daytona 500 race weekend, no practice is held. Additionally, qualifying is a two-round format with the top 10 cars from round 1 taking a second lap for pole.

For 6-10 events a year, NASCAR reverts to a more typical pre-pandemic format with a 50 minute session on Friday, qualifying on Saturday, and the race on Sunday. This is typically reserved for either major events on the calendar (such as Championship Weekend), a new track on the schedule (or a track NASCAR is returning to after an extended absence), or a recently re-surfaced or reconfigured track. NASCAR has also under certain circumstances expanded practice from 25 to 40 minutes if teams are overly concerned about tire wear, Goodyear brings a radically different tire to a race, or other unique circumstances.

The Daytona 500 continues to feature a unique schedule with a single 50 minute practice session Wednesday morning and a two round single car qualifying session Wednesday evening setting the lineup for the qualifying races on Thursday. Teams then have 50 minute practice on Friday and one more 50 minute practice on Saturday before the Daytona 500 on Sunday. The O’Reilly Auto Parts and Truck Series also have a single 50 minute practice session (Trucks Thursday before the Cup qualifying races, O’Reilly Auto Parts Friday). Qualifying for these series is held just a few hours before their race.
