= Geoff Bodine =

American racing driver (born 1949)

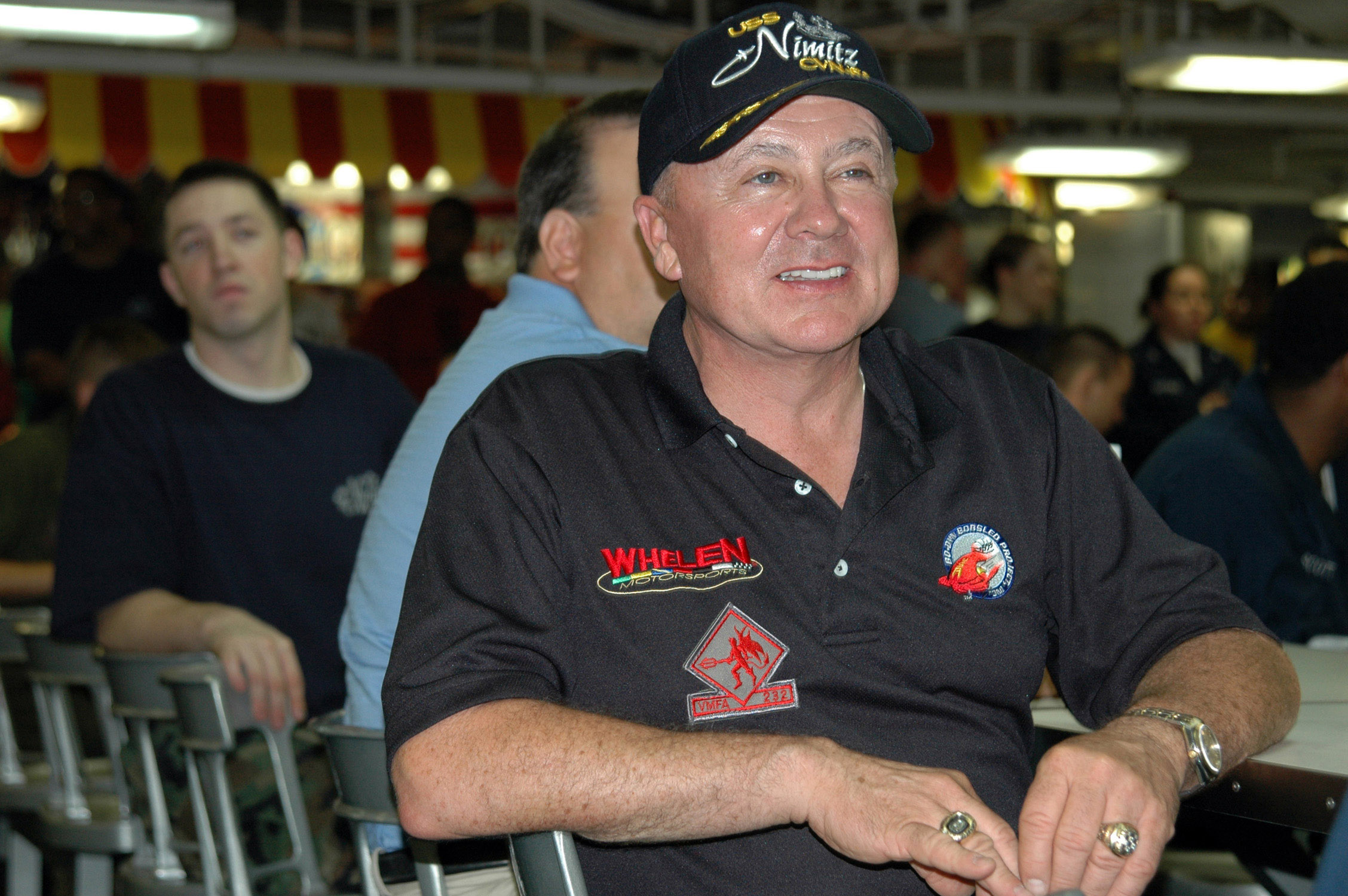
- Bodine in 2007
- Born: Geoffrey Eli Bodine; April 18, 1949 (age 77); Chemung, New York, U.S.
- Achievements: All-time wins leader in the Yankee All-Star League (11); All-time championships leader in the Yankee All-Star League (2); 1987 IROC Champion; 1976, 1978 Yankee All-Star League Champion; 1986 Daytona 500 Winner; 1994 The Winston Select Winner; 1992 Busch Clash Winner; 1980, 1981 Oxford 250 Winner; 1981 Dogwood 500 Classic Late Models Winner; 1980 Dogwood 500 Classic Modifieds Winner; 1975, 1976, 1978, 1981 Cardinal 500 Classic Modifieds Winner; 1972, 1978 Race of Champions Winner; 1980 Spring Sizzler Winner
- Awards: 1982 Winston Cup Series Rookie of the Year; Named one of NASCAR's 50 Greatest Drivers (1998); Named one of NASCAR's 75 Greatest Drivers (2023); Named one of NASCAR's all-time Top 10 modified Drivers; Listed in the Guinness World Records for "Most wins in one season" (55 wins in modifieds)

NASCAR Cup Series career
- 575 races run over 27 years
- Best finish: 3rd (1990)
- First race: 1979 Daytona 500 (Daytona)
- Last race: 2011 Ford 400 (Homestead)
- First win: 1984 Sovran Bank 500 (Martinsville)
- Last win: 1996 The Bud at the Glen (Watkins Glen)
Wins	Top tens	Poles
18	190	37

NASCAR O'Reilly Auto Parts Series career
- 94 races run over 13 years
- Best finish: 19th (1982)
- First race: 1982 Goody's 300 (Daytona)
- Last race: 2005 Federated Auto Parts 300 (Nashville)
- First win: 1982 TranSouth 200 (Darlington)
- Last win: 1989 County Squire 200 (Darlington)
Wins	Top tens	Poles
6	39	13

NASCAR FedEx Freight Truck Series career
- 22 races run over 5 years
- Best finish: 20th (1995)
- First race: 1995 Skoal Bandit Copper World Classic (Phoenix)
- Last race: 2010 E-Z-GO 200 (Atlanta)
Wins	Top tens	Poles
0	9	1
- Statistics up to date as of December 20, 2012.

Geoffrey Eli Bodine (born April 18, 1949) is an American former motorsport driver and bobsled builder. He raced at the NASCAR Cup Series from 1979 to 2011, earning 18 wins and a best season finish of third in 1990.

Bodine was born into a racing family as his father and grandfather, Eli Bodine Jr. and Sr. built Chemung Speedrome just a year after he was born. He is the oldest of the three Bodine brothers (with Brett Bodine and Todd Bodine), and sister Denise. Bodine began learning his racing skills at this track in the micro-midget division when he was only five years old. He had such an itch to race that he disguised himself as a lady and entered an event known as the Powder Puff Derby when he was 15.

== NASCAR Modified driver ==
Bodine's Modified in 1980

Bodine was already an accomplished driver before he hit the big-time in NASCAR's premier division, the Winston Cup Series, with his first start in 1979. By this time, Bodine was well known as a Modified driver in the Northeast, racing against popular drivers such as Richie Evans, Jerry Cook, Jimmy Spencer, Ron Bouchard, and others. Bodine earned Modified championships at Stafford Speedway, Shangri-La Speedway, Spencer Speedway, and Utica-Rome Speedway. He has won many of the big races in Modifieds including the Lancaster 200 (1978, 1981), Race of Champions (1972 – Trenton), the Stafford 200 (1978), the Trenton Dogleg 200 (1979), the Thompson 300, the Spring Sizzler (1980 – Stafford Speedway), Oswego Classic (1981), Cardinal Classic (1975 – Martinsville Speedway), Oxford 250 (1980, 1981), and other modified events.

In 1978, Bodine won more races than any other Modified driver in recorded history. Driving cars owned by Dick Armstrong with Billy Taylor and Ralph Hop Harrington as crew chief, Bodine started 84 feature events and won 55 of them. Among the most prestigious of these victories were the Race of Champions at Pocono, the Spring Sizzler at Stafford, the Budweiser 200 at Oswego, both major events at Martinsville, the Thompson 300, and a sweep of the six-race Yankee All-Star League series. For these fifty-five victories, Bodine is credited in the Guinness Book of World Records with "Most wins in one season".

Bodine's racing background also included wins in the Late Model division, Nationwide Series division, and others. He has six Busch Grand National wins to his credit.

== NASCAR Winston Cup career ==
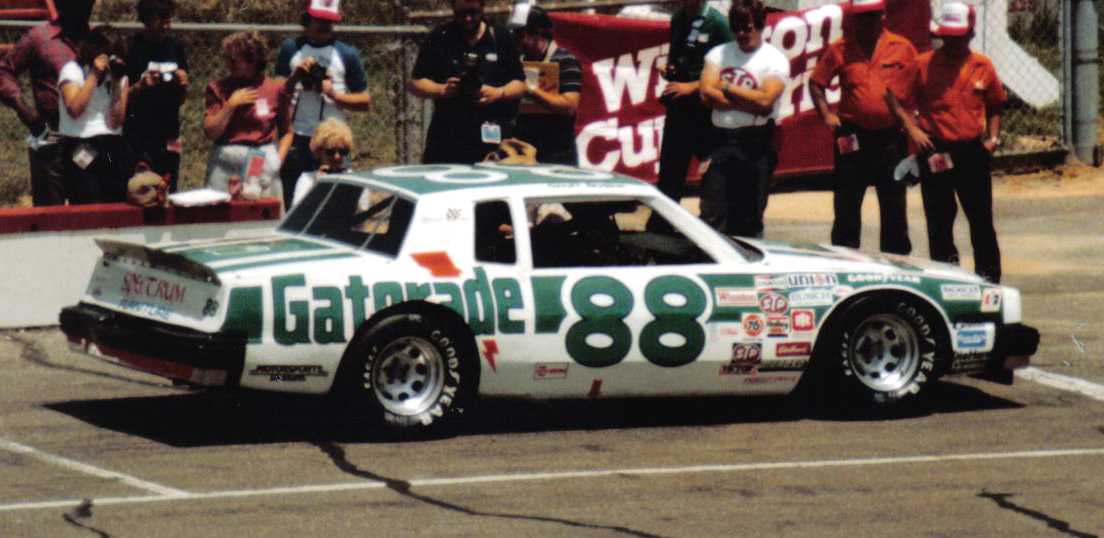
Bodine's Cup car in the 1983 Van Scoy Diamond Mine 500

Bodine is best known for his NASCAR Winston Cup career, and in his first full season in Winston Cup came in 1982 he earned Rookie of the Year honors. His first Winston Cup pole that year on his nineteenth start (1982 Firecracker 400) and scored his first Winston Cup victory two years later on his 69th start at Martinsville in 1984. This win was also the first win for Hendrick Motorsports, which was the team Bodine was racing for at the time. Bodine's biggest win came at the 1986 Daytona 500, NASCAR's premier event. Other career highlights include the 1987 International Race of Champions championship, the 1992 Busch Clash, the 1994 Winston Select (despite a first segment spinout), and the 1994 Busch Pole Award (now Budweiser Pole Award). Bodine's final win in NASCAR's highest division came in the "Bud At The Glen" in August 1996 when fortuitous pit stop timing led to him taking the lead in his QVC Thunderbird while the other drivers pitted. Bodine managed to hold off the field the rest of the way beating Terry Labonte to the line by 0.44 seconds to claim victory.

=== Cup career highlights ===
Bodine's Monte Carlo in 1984

After a few tumultuous years in Winston Cup, Bodine saw his career launch off the ground when he ran the No. 5 car for Hendrick Motorsports. He spent over 28 years in the sport, with his most successful years being between 1984 and 1996. Bodine has driven for some of the best car owners in NASCAR, including Junior Johnson, Bud Moore and Rick Hendrick as well as owning his own cars, which he ran for several seasons after buying the assets of Alan Kulwicki's race team after his death in 1993. He has 565 starts, 37 poles, eighteen wins, and nearly $16 million in winnings during his Winston Cup/Nextel Cup career. He was honored as one of "NASCAR's 50 Greatest Drivers" during NASCAR's 50th anniversary celebration. Bodine has always been a great innovator and brought many ideas to Winston Cup. He introduced power steering and full-faced helmets to Winston Cup. He was also the last driver to win a race and lap the field, in the fall 1994 race at North Wilkesboro Speedway. He holds the track record at Atlanta Motor Speedway from his polesitting run after the track was repaved in 1997, with a speed of over 197 mph.

=== Rivalry with Dale Earnhardt ===
Bodine and Dale Earnhardt

During the late 1980s, Bodine and seven-time Winston Cup champion Dale Earnhardt became embroiled in a rivalry. An incident in the 1987 running of The Winston triggered harsh feelings when Earnhardt knocked Bodine and Bill Elliott out of the way to win the $200,000 purse. NASCAR later fined Bodine $1,000 and put him on probation for three weeks. Six days later, the rivalry intensified when Bodine tagged Earnhardt in a Busch Grand National Series race at Charlotte Motor Speedway. Bodine and team owner Rick Hendrick claimed the wreck was unintentional, but NASCAR disagreed, fining Bodine another $15,000 and extending his probation to the end of 1987. Bodine later appealed and the penalty was revoked.

At the same Busch race in 1988, Earnhardt spun Bodine, and the New Yorker later retired from the race, later going over to Earnhardt's Cup car and drawing an "X" in the air over the car with his hand. The following day, while being passed by Bodine in the 1988 Coca-Cola 600, Earnhardt wrecked Bodine's car, leading NASCAR to assess a five-lap penalty on Earnhardt. Bodine's car owner, Rick Hendrick, claimed the penalty was too light, while Earnhardt's car owner Richard Childress thought the penalty was too harsh. Two days later, officials from the sanctioning body brought both drivers and car owners together for a meeting in Daytona Beach, Florida, where all involved parties settled their disputes.

Bodine would later say, in a 2015 article with the Racing Experts website, that he and Earnhardt were friends and got along well in their early racing days. They had dinner parties, and their children played with each other. However, when both drivers joined the NASCAR Winston Cup Series, their relationship changed, and they grew distant from each other. By the time the rivalry had begun, both drivers were at the prime of their careers, which partly contributed to the heated incidents with each other. Although the rivalry was put to an end by the NASCAR dinner meeting, both teams, and Bodine still have a difference of opinion on who was mostly responsible for it. In his autobiography, Bodine dedicated a chapter about Earnhardt where he spoke about their rivalry and his impact but closed it by stating, "And I found out after Dale's death that he actually hated me."

=== Daytona crash ===
While competing the inaugural Daytona 250 Truck Series race at Daytona International Speedway, on February 18, 2000, Bodine was involved in a vicious, fiery accident on the 57th lap of the race while driving the No. 15 Ford F-150 for Billy Ballew.

The crash started when then-rookie Kurt Busch, Rob Morgan, and Lyndon Amick were racing three-wide through the tri-oval front straightaway. In the exact moment Bodine moved to get around the outside of the trio, Morgan was turned across Busch's nose into the side of Amick's truck, who was at the bottom. Amick's truck was damaged in the contact, which caused it to veer hard right, pushing Morgan into Bodine who was on the outside. The contact between Morgan's front right tire and Bodine's front left tire caused the front of Bodine's truck to vault upwards over the outside retaining wall, sending his truck into the catch fencing nose first, at a speed of nearly 190 mph (310 km/h).

The force of the impact completely tore the front of the truck into pieces and ruptured its fuel cell, leaving only small parts of the roll cage intact. Just as Bodine was coming back down to the track, it was hit driver's side by Lonnie Rush Jr., which caused it to roll down the frontstretch. As it tumbled, it got hit yet again, this time by Jimmy Kitchens, which ignited the fuel that was spilling out of the tank. Bodine rolled nine times before coming to rest on his roof. The accident was so severe, the announcers, crew members and fans all believed that Bodine had been killed. Thirteen other trucks were involved, making it one of the largest wrecks in NASCAR Truck Series history. As a result of the collision, Bodine suffered fractures in his right wrist, right cheekbone, a vertebra in his back, and his right ankle; he also suffered a concussion. Kitchens was also hospitalized after his contact with Bodine. However, he suffered no serious injuries. Nine spectators were also injured in the crash.

Incredibly, Bodine missed only ten races of the 2000 Winston Cup season while recovering from his injuries, returning at Richmond International Raceway on May 6 and finishing thirteenth in a 400-lap race. However, Bodine's struggles over the ensuing months led to his dismissal from the team in September. In a feat of great accomplishment, he returned in the 2002 Daytona 500 to finish third behind race winner Ward Burton and second-placer finisher Elliott Sadler. However, including that race, Bodine only managed to make eighteen starts in the NASCAR Cup Series between 2001 and 2004, with only one top-five and two top-tens both in 2002. He attempted to qualify for the 2004 Brickyard 400 driving for Gary Trout Autosports, but was unable to and made no more attempts at any other races that year.

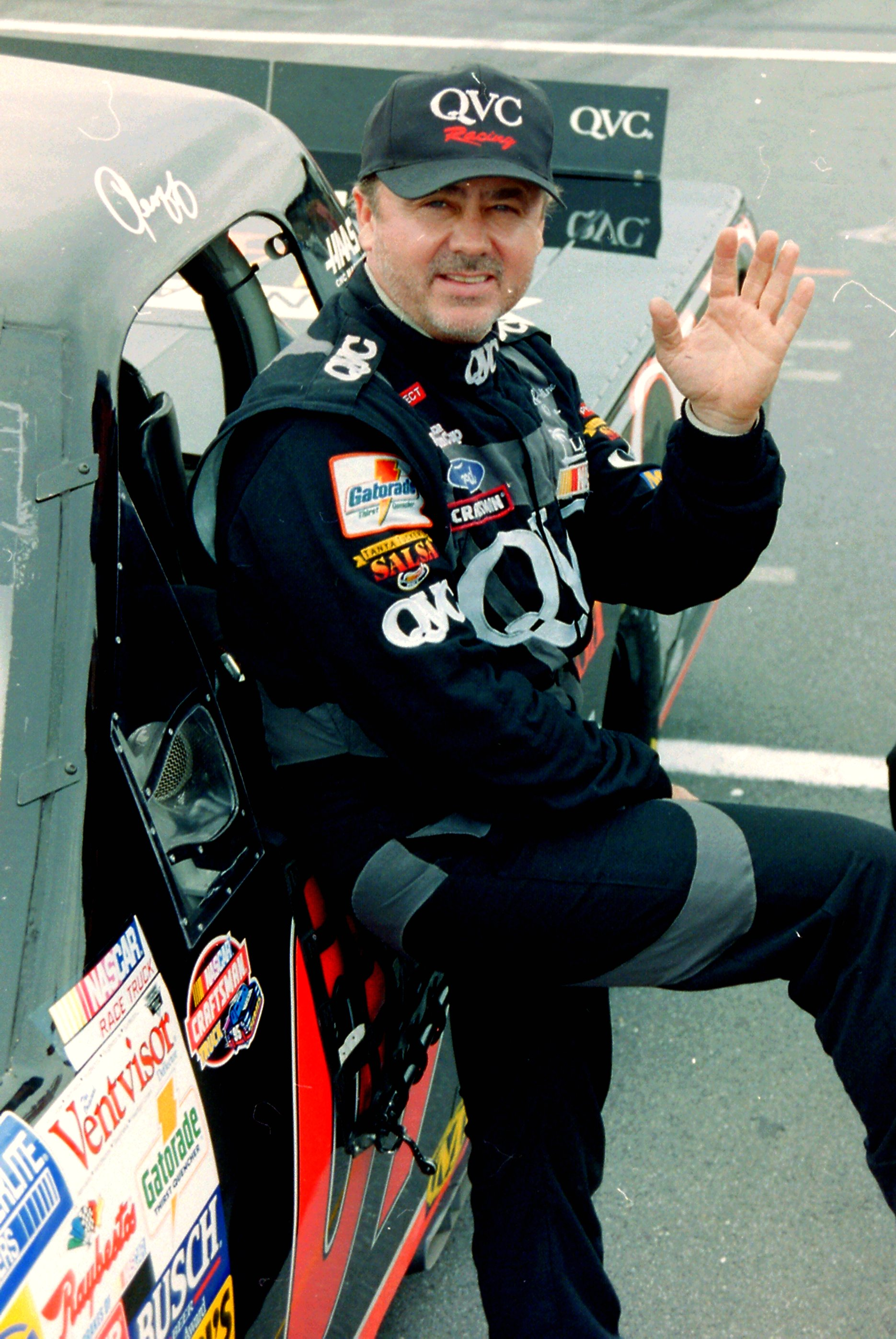
Bodine in 1996

=== Racing twilight ===
Geoff, brother Todd, and Larry Gunselman started a race team in 2009. Geoff attempted to qualify the No. 64 Toyota for the 2009 Daytona 500. In 2010, Geoff returned to the Camping World Truck Series for the first time since 2004 with Team Gill Racing at Atlanta. He finished 26th with engine problems despite qualifying an impressive eighth. In 2011, he drove for Tommy Baldwin Racing in the Sprint Cup Series, alternating between the Nos. 35 and 36 teams, with sponsorship from Luke & Associates.

=== Retirement ===
In October 2012, Bodine announced through TheRacingExperts.Com that he was retiring from NASCAR after 27 seasons. Bodine said he wanted to spend time with his family and do charitable deeds.

In June 2012, Bodine opened a Honda Power Sports dealership in West Melbourne, Florida, where he currently resides.

As of August 2014, Bodine is a Driver Analyst for The Racing Experts, the website that announced his retirement in 2012. He is a contributing columnist with articles published monthly.

Bodine has a book coming out in 2024, titled “All Of It,” per his social media pages.

== Bo-Dyn bobsleds ==
Bodine is the co-owner of the Bo-Dyn Bobsled Company. His bobsled interest came about while watching the 1992 Winter Olympics when the U.S. Bobsled team was having a tough time during competition. Bodine learned that the sleds being used were all imported and not built domestically. He felt that he could help the team win with better technology derived from his race car experience, engineering background, as well as the abundant design and construction resources offered to him through his NASCAR connections. With his interest captured, Bodine took a few runs in a bobsled at Lake Placid to confirm his feelings and to learn more about the sleds.

Bo-Dyn Bobsleds (Bo for Bodine, "Dyn" for Chassis Dynamics) was created in 1992 by Bodine and his good friend and chassis builder, Bob Cuneo of Chassis Dynamics. Bodine founded the USA Bobsled Project to help create a winning bobsled for the U.S. teams. The U.S. National Team first used their sleds in 1994. Ten years after Bo-Dyn's inception, the U.S. team won three medals in Bo-Dyn Bobsleds during the 2002 Winter Olympics in Salt Lake City, and during the 2010 Winter Olympics in Vancouver, British Columbia, American bobsledder Steven Holcomb piloted a Bo-Dyn Bobsled named "Night Train" to gold. Every January from 2006 to 2010 at the Lake Placid, New York track, a charity run is held with the US bobsled team and NASCAR drivers to raise money for the sled project. Participants have included Todd Bodine (one of Bodine's brothers) and Tony Stewart.

== Motorsports career results ==
=== NASCAR ===
(key) (Bold – Pole position awarded by qualifying time. Italics – Pole position earned by points standings or practice time. * – Most laps led.)

==== Sprint Cup Series ====
NASCAR Sprint Cup Series results
Year	Team	No.	Make	1	2	3	4	5	6	7	8	9	10	11	12	13	14	15	16	17	18	19	20	21	22	23	24	25	26	27	28	29	30	31	32	33	34	35	36	NSCC	Pts	Ref
1979	Race Hill Farm Team	47	Olds	RSD	DAY; 29	CAR; 22	RCH	ATL; 35	NWS	BRI	DAR	MAR	TAL	NSV	DOV	CLT	TWS	RSD	MCH	DAY	NSV	POC	TAL	MCH	BRI	DAR	RCH	DOV	MAR	CLT	NWS	CAR	ATL	ONT						83rd	139	
1981	Bahre Racing	23	Pontiac	RSD	DAY; 22	RCH	CAR	ATL	BRI	NWS	DAR; 30	MAR	TAL	NSV	DOV	CLT	TWS	RSD	MCH	DAY	NSV	POC	TAL	MCH	BRI	DAR	RCH	DOV												45th	420	
1981	Zervakis Enterprises	01	Buick																										MAR; 23	NWS	CLT; 7	CAR	ATL; 30	RSD						45th	420	
1982	Bahre Racing	23	Buick	DAY; 42	RCH	BRI	ATL	CAR	DAR																															22nd	2654	
1982	Cliff Stewart Racing	50	Pontiac							NWS; 15	MAR; 25	TAL; 33	NSV; 21	DOV; 21	CLT; 25	POC; 8	RSD; 3	MCH; 9	**DAY**; 6	NSV; 6	POC; 11	**TAL**; 15	MCH; 4	BRI; 10	DAR; 7	RCH; 28	DOV; 4	NWS; 5	CLT; 13	MAR; 11	CAR; 27	ATL; 19	RSD; 11							22nd	2654	
1983	Cliff Stewart Racing	88	Pontiac	DAY; 30	RCH; 4	CAR; 19	**ATL**; 41	DAR; 9*	NWS; 5	MAR; 25	TAL; 21	NSV; 20	DOV; 35	BRI; 25	CLT; 36	RSD; 29	POC; 30	MCH; 9	DAY; 6	NSV; 16	POC; 39	TAL; 6	MCH; 36	BRI; 4	DAR; 13	RCH; 21	DOV; 2	MAR; 5	NWS; 11	CLT; 28	CAR; 33	ATL	RSD							17th	3019	
1984	All-Star Racing	5	Chevy	DAY; 8	RCH; 9	CAR; 6	ATL; 13	BRI; 25	NWS; 14	DAR; 35	MAR; 1	TAL; 34	NSV; 3	DOV; 10	CLT; 5	RSD; 4	POC; 36	MCH; 7	DAY; 12	NSV; 1*	POC; 12	TAL; 26	MCH; 34	**BRI**; 22	DAR; 12	RCH; 4	DOV; 9	**MAR**; 28	CLT; 6	NWS; 23	**CAR**; 19	ATL; 24*	RSD; 1							9th	3734	
1985	Hendrick Motorsports	5	Chevy	DAY; 7	RCH; 2	CAR; 12	ATL; 2	BRI; 18	DAR; 7	NWS; 5	MAR; 3	TAL; 11	DOV; 11	CLT; 16	RSD; 22	POC; 4*	MCH; 11	DAY; 14	POC; 4	TAL; 23	MCH; 23	BRI; 25	DAR; 3	**RCH**; 7	DOV; 25	**MAR**; 24	**NWS**; 2	CLT; 3	CAR; 5	ATL; 11	RSD; 6									5th	3862	
1986	Hendrick Motorsports	5	Chevy	DAY; 1*	RCH; 8	CAR; 20	ATL; 10	**BRI**; 24	**DAR**; 40	**NWS**; 3	MAR; 17	TAL; 27	DOV; 1	**CLT**; 31	RSD; 39	**POC**; 9	MCH; 3	DAY; 29	POC; 3*	TAL; 23	GLN; 19*	MCH; 4	**BRI**; 3	DAR; 8	RCH; 13	**DOV**; 28	**MAR**; 2*	NWS; 2*	CLT; 6	CAR; 32	ATL; 38	RSD; 3*								8th	3678	
1987	Hendrick Motorsports	5	Chevy	DAY; 14	CAR; 32	RCH; 2	ATL; 15	DAR; 11	NWS; 28	BRI; 19	MAR; 3	TAL; 40	CLT; 18	DOV; 28	POC; 9	RSD; 27	MCH; 11	DAY; 39	POC; 34	TAL; 13	GLN; 15	MCH; 10	BRI; 6	DAR; 18	RCH; 6	DOV; 6	**MAR**; 20	NWS; 5	CLT; 31	CAR; 8	**RSD**; 10*	ATL; 31								13th	3328	
1988	Hendrick Motorsports	5	Chevy	DAY; 14	RCH; 13	CAR; 18	**ATL**; 33	DAR; 7	BRI; 3	NWS; 9	MAR; 15	TAL; 3*	CLT; 24	DOV; 8	RSD; 34	POC; 1*	MCH; 5	DAY; 16	POC; 4	TAL; 2	**GLN**; 32	MCH; 10	BRI; 3	DAR; 7	RCH; 22	DOV; 5	MAR; 5	CLT; 31	NWS; 3	CAR; 30	**PHO**; 6	ATL; 15								6th	3799	
1989	Hendrick Motorsports	5	Chevy	DAY; 4	CAR; 4	ATL; 19	**RCH**; 18*	DAR; 3	BRI; 3	NWS; 7	**MAR**; 16	TAL; 12	CLT; 4	DOV; 29	SON; 20	POC; 35	MCH; 27	DAY; 22	POC; 17	TAL; 35	GLN; 21	**MCH**; 5	BRI; 16	DAR; 12	RCH; 3	DOV; 27	MAR; 16	CLT; 22	NWS; 1	CAR; 7	PHO; 28	ATL; 2								9th	3600	
1990	Junior Johnson & Associates	11	Ford	DAY; 9	RCH; 33	CAR; 2	ATL; 7	**DAR**; 4*	BRI; 24	NWS; 8	**MAR**; 1*	TAL; 24	CLT; 10	DOV; 15	SON; 4	POC; 3*	MCH; 3	DAY; 25	POC; 1*	TAL; 17	GLN; 2	MCH; 7	BRI; 11	DAR; 8	RCH; 9	DOV; 36	MAR; 1	NWS; 16	CLT; 36	CAR; 4	PHO; 8	ATL; 2								3rd	4017	
1991	Junior Johnson & Associates	11	Ford	DAY; 32	RCH; 13	CAR; 12	ATL; 23	**DAR**; 9	BRI; 24	NWS; 28	MAR; 20	TAL; 6	CLT	DOV			MCH; 39	DAY; 2	POC; 3	TAL; 30	GLN; 22	MCH; 35	BRI; 31	DAR; 7	RCH; 14	DOV; 2	MAR; 23	NWS; 15	CLT; 1	CAR; 4	**PHO**; 8	ATL; 8								14th	3277	
1991	Junior Johnson & Associates	97	Ford												SON; 8	POC; 5																								14th	3277	
1992	Bud Moore Engineering	15	Ford	DAY; 3	CAR; 14	RCH; 16	ATL; 6	DAR; 8	BRI; 12	NWS; 4	MAR; 32	TAL; 13	CLT; 32	DOV; 17	SON; 10	POC; 14	MCH; 11	DAY; 4	POC; 30	TAL; 38	GLN; 27	MCH; 40	BRI; 11	DAR; 19	RCH; 5	DOV; 14	MAR; 1	NWS; 1*	CLT; 10	CAR; 35	PHO; 39	ATL; 3								16th	3437	
1993	Bud Moore Engineering	15	Ford	DAY; 3	CAR; 9	RCH; 12	ATL; 6	DAR; 8	BRI; 18	NWS; 28	**MAR**; 6	TAL; 27	SON; 1	CLT; 10	DOV; 23	POC; 24	MCH; 17	DAY; 37	NHA; 12	POC; 12	TAL; 16	GLN; 16	MCH; 24	BRI; 8	DAR; 20	RCH; 34														16th	3338	
1993	Geoff Bodine Racing	7	Ford																								DOV; 30	MAR; 14	NWS; 31	CLT; 13	CAR; 10	PHO; 43	ATL; 39							16th	3338	
1994	Geoff Bodine Racing	7	Ford	DAY; 11	**CAR**; 15	RCH; 32	ATL; 38	DAR; 40	BRI; 4	NWS; 7	MAR; 34	TAL; 41	SON; 2	CLT; 3	DOV; 41	POC; 19	MCH; 28	DAY; 6	NHA; 31	**POC**; 1*	TAL; 33	IND; 39	GLN; 29	**MCH**; 1*	BRI; 23*	**DAR**; 27	RCH; 18	**DOV**; 5*	MAR; 18	NWS; 1*	CLT; 32*	CAR; 40	PHO; 8	ATL; 34						17th	3297	
1995	Geoff Bodine Racing	7	Ford	DAY; 20	CAR; 21	RCH; 11	ATL; 30	DAR; 13	BRI; 23	NWS; 14	MAR; 35	TAL; 7	SON; 22	CLT; 26	DOV; 27	POC; 14	MCH; 21	DAY; 14	NHA; 35	POC; 6	TAL; 24	IND; 15	GLN; 9	MCH; 27	BRI; 12	DAR; 35	RCH; 19	DOV; 24	MAR; 5	NWS; 11	CLT; 16	CAR; 15	PHO; 16	ATL; 11						16th	3357	
1996	Geoff Bodine Racing	7	Ford	DAY; 34	CAR; 39	RCH; 33	ATL; 23	DAR; 22	BRI; 19	NWS; 19	MAR; 27	TAL; 26	SON; 40	CLT; 10	DOV; 30	POC; 3	MCH; 21	DAY; 34	NHA; 15	POC; 11	TAL; 6	IND; 20	GLN; 1	MCH; 12	BRI; 39	DAR; 21	RCH; 17	DOV; 11	MAR; 7	NWS; 30	CLT; 20	CAR; 15	PHO; 6	ATL; 26						17th	3218	
1997	Geoff Bodine Racing	7	Ford	DAY; 34	CAR; 8	RCH; 2	ATL; 20	DAR; 9	TEX; 14	BRI; 33	MAR; 29	SON; 44	TAL; 43	CLT	DOV; 42	POC; 8	MCH; 40	CAL; 35	DAY; DNQ	NHA; 10	POC; 17	IND; DNQ	GLN; 2	MCH; 11	BRI; 9	DAR; 12	RCH; 4	NHA; 16	DOV; 14	MAR; 28	**CLT**; 43	TAL; 8	CAR; 19	PHO; 10	**ATL**; 33					22nd	3046	
1998	Mattei Motorsports	7	Ford	DAY; 31	CAR; 5	LVS; 13	ATL; 22	DAR; 41	BRI; 39	TEX; 32	MAR; 35	TAL; DNQ	CAL; 7	CLT; 23	DOV; 23	RCH; 28	MCH; 23	POC; 40	SON; 35	NHA; 37	POC; 14	IND; 37	GLN; 32	MCH; 21	BRI; 30	NHA; 23	DAR; 9	RCH; 13	DOV; 14	MAR; 39	CLT; 9	TAL; 25	DAY; 41	PHO; 34	CAR; 11	ATL; 10				27th	2864	
1999	Joe Bessey Motorsports	60	Chevy	DAY; 39	CAR; 8	LVS; 32	ATL; 38	DAR; 17	TEX; 36	BRI; 28	MAR; 38	TAL; 17	CAL; 37	RCH; 17	CLT; 41	DOV; 15	MCH; 20	POC; 33	SON; 28	DAY; 28	NHA; 32	POC; 13	IND; 25	GLN; 35	MCH; 17	BRI; 13	DAR; 24	RCH; 23	NHA; 35	DOV; 24	MAR; 3	CLT; 20	TAL; 23	CAR; 31	PHO; 22	HOM; 11	ATL; 18			27th	3053	
2000	Joe Bessey Motorsports	60	Chevy	DAY; DNQ	CAR	LVS	ATL	DAR	BRI	TEX	MAR	TAL	CAL	RCH; 13	CLT; 29	DOV; 40	MCH; 38	POC; 24	SON; DNQ	DAY; 34	NHA; 13	POC; DNQ	IND; 12	GLN; 24	MCH; DNQ	BRI; 25	DAR; 39	RCH; 41	NHA	DOV	MAR	CLT	TAL	CAR	PHO					45th	1039	
2000	MacPherson Motorsports	98	Ford																																	HOM; 41				45th	1039	
2000	Andy Petree Racing	35	Chevy																																		ATL; 43			45th	1039	
2001	Brett Bodine Racing	09	Ford	DAY	CAR	LVS	ATL	DAR	BRI	TEX	MAR	TAL	CAL	RCH	CLT	DOV	MCH	POC	SON	DAY	CHI	NHA	POC	IND	GLN	MCH	BRI; 27	DAR	RCH	DOV	KAN	CLT	MAR	TAL	PHO	CAR	HOM; 37	ATL	NHA	68th	52	
2002	Phoenix Racing	09	Ford	DAY; 3	CAR	LVS	ATL	DAR	BRI	TEX	MAR	TAL; 12	CAL	RCH	CLT	DOV	POC			DAY; 10	CHI			IND; 40	GLN	MCH	BRI	DAR	RCH; 38	NHA	DOV	KAN	TAL; DNQ	CLT		ATL; DNQ	CAR	PHO	HOM; DNQ	43rd	803	
2002	Haas-Carter Motorsports	26	Ford															MCH; 19	SON				POC; 34																HOM; 32	43rd	803	
2002	Haas-Carter Motorsports	66	Ford																			NHA; 43																		43rd	803	
2002	Bill Davis Racing	23	Dodge																																MAR; 39					43rd	803	
2003	Brett Bodine Racing	11	Ford	DAY	CAR	LVS	ATL	DAR	BRI	TEX	TAL	MAR	CAL	RCH	CLT	DOV	POC	MCH; 39	SON	DAY	CHI	NHA	POC	IND	GLN	MCH	BRI	DAR	RCH	NHA	DOV	TAL	KAN	CLT	MAR	ATL	PHO	CAR	HOM	70th	46	
2004	Mach 1 Motorsports	98	Ford	DAY	CAR	LVS	ATL	DAR	BRI; 39	TEX	MAR	TAL	CAL	RCH	CLT; DNQ	DOV	POC; 28	MCH; 32	SON	DAY	CHI	NHA	POC							NHA; 41	DOV; 39	TAL	KAN	CLT; DNQ	MAR	ATL				56th	278	
2004	Gary Trout Autosports	34	Dodge																					IND; DNQ	GLN	MCH	BRI	CAL	RCH											56th	278	
2004	GIC-Mixon Motorsports	93	Chevy																																		PHO; DNQ	DAR	HOM; Wth	56th	278	
2005	GIC-Mixon Motorsports	93	Chevy	DAY; DNQ	CAL	LVS	ATL	BRI	MAR	TEX	PHO	TAL	DAR	RCH	CLT	DOV	POC	MCH	SON	DAY	CHI	NHA	POC	IND	GLN	MCH	BRI	CAL	RCH	NHA	DOV	TAL	KAN	CLT	MAR	ATL	TEX	PHO	HOM	NA	-	
2009	Gunselman Motorsports	64	Toyota	DAY; DNQ	CAL	LVS	ATL; DNQ	BRI	MAR	TEX	PHO	TAL	RCH	DAR	CLT	DOV	POC	MCH	SON	NHA	DAY	CHI	IND	POC	GLN	MCH	BRI	ATL	RCH	NHA	DOV	KAN	CAL	CLT	MAR	TAL	TEX	PHO	HOM	72nd	0	
2010	Tommy Baldwin Racing	36	Chevy	DAY	CAL	LVS	ATL	BRI	MAR	PHO	TEX	TAL	RCH	DAR	DOV	CLT	POC; 41	MCH	SON	NHA	DAY	CHI	IND	POC	GLN	MCH	BRI	ATL	RCH	NHA	DOV	KAN	CAL	CLT	MAR	TAL	TEX	PHO	HOM	73rd	40	
2011	Tommy Baldwin Racing	35	Chevy	DAY	PHO	LVS	BRI	CAL	MAR	TEX	TAL	RCH	DAR	DOV	CLT	KAN	POC	MCH	SON	DAY; 38	KEN	NHA	IND	POC; DNQ	GLN	MCH	BRI	ATL; DNQ	RCH	CHI	NHA	DOV	KAN	CLT; DNQ	TAL; DNQ	MAR				44th	33	
2011	Tommy Baldwin Racing	36	Chevy																																		TEX; 38	PHO; 37	HOM; 30	44th	33	

===== Daytona 500 =====
Year	Team	Manufacturer	Start	Finish
1979	Race Hill Farm Team	Oldsmobile	16	29
1981	Bahre Racing	Pontiac	14	22
1982	Bahre Racing	Buick	34	42
1983	Cliff Stewart Racing	Pontiac	2	30
1984	All-Star Racing	Chevrolet	9	8
1985	Hendrick Motorsports	Chevrolet	17	7
1986	Hendrick Motorsports	Chevrolet	2	**1**
1987	Hendrick Motorsports	Chevrolet	8	14
1988	Hendrick Motorsports	Chevrolet	15	14
1989	Hendrick Motorsports	Chevrolet	10	4
1990	Junior Johnson & Associates	Ford	3	9
1991	Junior Johnson & Associates	Ford	19	32
1992	Bud Moore Engineering	Ford	16	3
1993	Bud Moore Engineering	Ford	6	3
1994	Geoff Bodine Racing	Ford	39	11
1995	Geoff Bodine Racing	Ford	40	20
1996	Geoff Bodine Racing	Ford	38	34
1997	Geoff Bodine Racing	Ford	25	34
1998	Mattei Motorsports	Ford	25	31
1999	Joe Bessey Motorsports	Chevrolet	30	39
2000	Joe Bessey Motorsports	Chevrolet	DNQ	
2002	Phoenix Racing	Ford	35	3
2005	GIC-Mixon Motorsports	Chevrolet	DNQ	
2009	Gunselman Motorsports	Toyota	DNQ	

==== Busch Series ====
NASCAR Busch Series results
Year	Team	No.	Make	1	2	3	4	5	6	7	8	9	10	11	12	13	14	15	16	17	18	19	20	21	22	23	24	25	26	27	28	29	30	31	32	33	34	35	NBGNC	Pts	Ref
1982	Plessinger Racing	99	Pontiac	DAY; 5	**RCH**; 20		**MAR**; 4	DAR; 1	HCY; 5	SBO	CRW	RCH	LGY	DOV; 8	HCY	CLT; 8	ASH	HCY	SBO	CAR; 20	CRW	SBO	HCY	LGY	IRP	BRI	HCY	RCH											19th	1334	
1982	Plessinger Racing	01	Chevy			BRI; 16																																	19th	1334	
1982	Plessinger Racing	1	Pontiac																										MAR; 28	CLT	HCY	MAR							19th	1334	
1983	Plessinger Racing	89	Pontiac	DAY; 2		CAR; 23	HCY	MAR	NWS	SBO	GPS	LGY	DOV	BRI	CLT	SBO	HCY	ROU	SBO; 16	ROU	CRW	ROU	SBO	HCY	LGY	IRP	GPS	BRI	HCY	DAR	RCH	NWS	SBO	MAR	ROU	CLT	HCY	MAR	45th	534	
1983	Plessinger Racing	50	Pontiac		RCH; 5																																		45th	534	
1984	All-Star Racing	15	Pontiac	DAY; 3	RCH	CAR; 24	HCY	MAR											SBO; 5	ROU	HCY	IRP; 4	LGY	**SBO**; 4	BRI; 28	DAR; 33	RCH; 2	NWS	CLT; 4	HCY	**CAR**; 1*	**MAR**; 8							23rd	1554	
1984	All-Star Racing	15	Chevy						DAR; 2	ROU	NSV	LGY	MLW	DOV	CLT	SBO	HCY	ROU																					23rd	1554	
1985	Hendrick Motorsports	5	Pontiac	DAY; 1*	**CAR**; 3	HCY	BRI; 16*	MAR	DAR; 32	SBO	LGY	DOV	CLT	SBO	HCY	ROU	IRP	SBO	LGY	HCY	MLW	BRI	DAR	RCH	NWS	ROU													34th	697	
1985	Hendrick Motorsports	15	Pontiac																								**CLT**; 2*	HCY	CAR	MAR									34th	697	
1986	Hendrick Motorsports	15	Pontiac	DAY; 2	CAR	HCY	MAR																									CLT; 5	CAR	MAR					65th	170	
1986	Hendrick Motorsports	5	Pontiac					**BRI**; 16	DAR	SBO	LGY	JFC	DOV	CLT	SBO	HCY	ROU	IRP	SBO	RAL	OXF	SBO	HCY	LGY	ROU	BRI	DAR	RCH	DOV	MAR	ROU								65th	170	
1987	Hendrick Motorsports	15	Chevy	DAY; 1	HCY	MAR	**DAR**; 2	BRI	LGY	SBO	CLT; 13	DOV	IRP	ROU	JFC	OXF	SBO	HCY	RAL	LGY	ROU	BRI; 16*	JFC	DAR	RCH; 3	DOV	MAR	CLT; 39	CAR; 2	MAR; 19									37th	685	
1988	Hendrick Motorsports	15	Chevy	DAY; 2	HCY	CAR	MAR	**DAR**; 1	BRI	LNG	NZH	SBO	NSV	**CLT**; 29*	DOV	ROU	LAN	LVL	MYB	OXF	SBO	HCY	LNG	IRP	ROU		**DAR**; 2	RCH; 26	DOV	MAR	CLT; 2*	CAR; 6	MAR; 27						31st	1171	
1988	Henderson Motorsports	66	Buick																							BRI; 25													31st	1171	
1989	Hendrick Motorsports	15	Chevy	DAY; 5	CAR	MAR	HCY	**DAR**; 1*	BRI	NZH	SBO	LAN	NSV	CLT; 10*	DOV	ROU	LVL	VOL	MYB	SBO	HCY	DUB	IRP	ROU	BRI	DAR	RCH	DOV	MAR	CLT	CAR								53rd	469	
1989	Bill Davis Racing	1	Ford																													MAR; 4							53rd	469	
1990	Henry Shaw Racing	01	Ford	DAY; DNQ	RCH	CAR	MAR	HCY	DAR; 28	BRI	LAN	SBO	NZH	HCY	CLT	DOV	ROU	VOL	MYB																				97th	79	
1990	Henry Shaw Racing	14	Pontiac																	OXF; 24	NHA	SBO	DUB	IRP	ROU	BRI	DAR	RCH	DOV	MAR	CLT	NHA	CAR	MAR					97th	79	
1999	Shoemaker Racing	64	Chevy	DAY; QL^{†}	CAR; 8	LVS; 17	ATL; 7	DAR; 14	TEX	NSV	BRI; 25	TAL	CAL; 16	NHA; 41	RCH; DNQ	NZH	CLT; DNQ	DOV; 15	SBO	GLN	MLW	MYB	PPR																47th	1093	
1999	Joe Bessey Racing	06	Chevy																					GTY; 41	IRP	MCH	BRI	DAR	RCH	DOV									47th	1093	
1999	BACE Motorsports	33	Chevy																												CLT; 17	CAR	MEM; 38	PHO	HOM				47th	1093	
2000	Cicci-Welliver Racing	36	Chevy	DAY	CAR	LVS	ATL	DAR	BRI	TEX	NSV	TAL	CAL	RCH	NHA	CLT	DOV	SBO	MYB	GLN	MLW	NZH	PPR	GTY	IRP	MCH	BRI	DAR	RCH	DOV	CLT	CAR; 14	MEM	PHO	HOM				89th	121	
2001	Cicci-Welliver Racing	66	Chevy	DAY	CAR	LVS	ATL	DAR	BRI	TEX	NSH	TAL	CAL	RCH	NHA	NZH	CLT	DOV	KEN; 41	MLW; 17	GLN; 20	CHI; 23	GTY; 19	PPR; 18	IRP; 8	MCH; 40	BRI; 14	DAR; 34	RCH; 4	DOV; 22	KAN; 26	CLT; 33	MEM; 35	PHO; 30	CAR; 18	HOM			34th	1582	
2002	Phoenix Racing	51	Ford	DAY	CAR	LVS	DAR	BRI	TEX	NSH	TAL	CAL	RCH	NHA	NZH	CLT	DOV	NSH	KEN	MLW	DAY	CHI	GTY	PPR	IRP	MCH	BRI	DAR	RCH	DOV	KAN	CLT	MEM	ATL	CAR	PHO	HOM; DNQ		NA	-	
2005	MacDonald Motorsports	72	Chevy	DAY	CAL	MXC	LVS	ATL; 37	NSH; 21	BRI; 29	TEX; 38	PHO; 34	TAL; DNQ	DAR; 42	RCH; DNQ	CLT	DOV; 21	NSH; 31	KEN	MLW	DAY	CHI	NHA	PPR	GTY	IRP	GLN	MCH	BRI	CAL	RCH	DOV	KAN	CLT	MEM	TEX	PHO	HOM	66th	545	
^{†} - Qualified for Barry Bodine

==== Camping World Truck Series ====
NASCAR Camping World Truck Series results
Year	Team	No.	Make	1	2	3	4	5	6	7	8	9	10	11	12	13	14	15	16	17	18	19	20	21	22	23	24	25	NCWTC	Pts	Ref
1995	Geoff Bodine Racing	7	Ford	PHO; 5	TUS	SGS; 2	MMR	POR; 6	EVG	I70	LVL	BRI; 2	MLW	CNS	HPT	IRP; 25	FLM	RCH; 2*	MAR; 15	NWS; 3*	SON	MMR; 26	PHO; 3						20th	1436	
1996	Geoff Bodine Racing	07	Ford	**HOM**; 33	PHO	POR	EVG	TUS	CNS	HPT	BRI	NZH; 8	MLW	LVL	I70	IRP	FLM	GLN; 17	NSV	RCH	NHA	MAR	NWS	SON	MMR	PHO	LVS; 39		53rd	364	
2000	Billy Ballew Motorsports	15	Ford	DAY; 24	HOM	PHO	MMR	MAR	PIR	GTY	MEM	PPR	EVG	TEX	KEN	GLN	MLW	NHA	NZH	MCH	IRP	NSV	CIC	RCH	DOV	TEX	CAL		94th	91	
2003	Alvin Thompson Racing	36	Ford	DAY; DNQ	DAR; 27	MMR	MAR	CLT	DOV	TEX	MEM	MLW	KAN	KEN	GTW	MCH	IRP	NSH	BRI	RCH	NHA	CAL	LVS	SBO	TEX	MAR	PHO	HOM	113th	82	
2004	Team EJP	03	Chevy	DAY; 10	ATL; 21	MAR; DNQ	MFD; 22	CLT; 27	DOV	TEX	MEM	MLW	KAN																40th	495	
2004	Ron Rhodes Racing	48	Dodge											KEN; 27	GTW	MCH	IRP	NSH	BRI	RCH	NHA	LVS	CAL	TEX	MAR	PHO	DAR	HOM	40th	495	
2010	Team Gill Racing	95	Dodge	DAY	ATL; 26	MAR	NSH	KAN	DOV	CLT	TEX	MCH	IOW	GTY	IRP	POC	NSH	DAR	BRI	CHI	KEN	NHA	LVS	MAR	TAL	TEX	PHO	HOM	103rd	85	

=== International Race of Champions ===
(key) (Bold – Pole position. * – Most laps led.)

International Race of Champions results
Year	Make	1	2	3	4	Pos.	Points
1987	Chevy	DAY; 1*	MOH; 5	MCH; 3	**GLN**; 1*	1st	76
1988	Chevy	DAY; 5	RSD; 9	MCH; 1*	**GLN**; 12	6th	45
1991	Dodge	DAY; 6	TAL; 12	MCH; 5	GLN; 10	8th	29
1996	Pontiac	DAY	TAL	CLT	MCH; 11	NA	0

Sporting positions
Preceded by Al Unser Jr.	IROC Champion; IROC XI (1987)	Succeeded by Al Unser Jr.
Achievements
Preceded by Bill Elliott	Daytona 500 Winner; 1986	Succeeded by Bill Elliott
Preceded by Dale Earnhardt	Busch Clash Winner; 1992	Succeeded by Dale Earnhardt
