= 1997 The Bud at The Glen =

20th race of the 1997 NASCAR Winston Cup Series

Race details
- Race 20 of 32 in the 1997 NASCAR Winston Cup Series
- The 1997 The Bud at The Glen program cover, featuring Geoff Bodine.
- Date: August 10, 1997
- Official name: 12th Annual The Bud at The Glen
- Location: Watkins Glen, New York, Watkins Glen International
- Course: Permanent racing facility
- Course length: 2.45 miles (3.943 km)
- Distance: 90 laps, 220.5 mi (354.86 km)
- Scheduled distance: 90 laps, 220.5 mi (354.86 km)
- Average speed: 91.294 miles per hour (146.923 km/h)

Pole position
Driver	Todd Bodine	Team 34
- Time: 1:13.192

Most laps led
Driver	Jeff Gordon	Hendrick Motorsports
- Laps: 32

Winner
No. 24	Jeff Gordon	Hendrick Motorsports

Television in the United States
- Network: ESPN
- Announcers: Bob Jenkins, Ned Jarrett, Benny Parsons

Radio in the United States
- Radio: Motor Racing Network

The 1997 The Bud at The Glen was the 20th stock car race of the 1997 NASCAR Winston Cup Series and the 12th iteration of the event. The race was held on Sunday, August 10, 1997, at the shortened layout of Watkins Glen International, a 2.45 miles (3.943 km) permanent road course layout. The race took the scheduled 90 laps to complete. At race's end, Hendrick Motorsports driver Jeff Gordon would manage to dominate the late stages of the race to take his 27th career NASCAR Winston Cup Series victory and his eighth victory of the season. To fill out the top three, Geoff Bodine Racing driver Geoff Bodine and Penske Racing South driver Rusty Wallace would finish second and third, respectively.

== Background ==
The layout of Watkins Glen International NASCAR uses.

Watkins Glen International (nicknamed "The Glen") is an automobile race track located in Watkins Glen, New York at the southern tip of Seneca Lake. It was long known around the world as the home of the Formula One United States Grand Prix, which it hosted for twenty consecutive years (1961–1980), but the site has been home to road racing of nearly every class, including the World Sportscar Championship, Trans-Am, Can-Am, NASCAR Sprint Cup Series, the International Motor Sports Association and the IndyCar Series.

Initially, public roads in the village were used for the race course. In 1956 a permanent circuit for the race was built. In 1968 the race was extended to six hours, becoming the 6 Hours of Watkins Glen. The circuit's current layout has more or less been the same since 1971, although a chicane was installed at the uphill Esses in 1975 to slow cars through these corners, where there was a fatality during practice at the 1973 United States Grand Prix. The chicane was removed in 1985, but another chicane called the "Inner Loop" was installed in 1992 after J. D. McDuffie's fatal accident during the previous year's NASCAR Winston Cup event.

The circuit is known as the Mecca of North American road racing and is a very popular venue among fans and drivers. The facility is currently owned by NASCAR.

=== Entry list ===
- (R) denotes rookie driver.

No.	Driver	Team	Make
1	Lance Hooper	Precision Products Racing	Pontiac
2	Rusty Wallace	Penske Racing South	Ford
3	Dale Earnhardt	Richard Childress Racing	Chevrolet
4	Sterling Marlin	Morgan–McClure Motorsports	Chevrolet
5	Terry Labonte	Hendrick Motorsports	Chevrolet
6	Mark Martin	Roush Racing	Ford
7	Geoff Bodine	Geoff Bodine Racing	Ford
8	Hut Stricklin	Stavola Brothers Racing	Ford
10	Ricky Rudd	Rudd Performance Motorsports	Ford
11	Brett Bodine	Brett Bodine Racing	Ford
14	Steve Park	Dale Earnhardt, Inc.	Chevrolet
16	Ted Musgrave	Roush Racing	Ford
17	Darrell Waltrip	Darrell Waltrip Motorsports	Chevrolet
18	Bobby Labonte	Joe Gibbs Racing	Pontiac
21	Michael Waltrip	Wood Brothers Racing	Ford
22	Ward Burton	Bill Davis Racing	Pontiac
23	Jimmy Spencer	Haas-Carter Motorsports	Ford
24	Jeff Gordon	Hendrick Motorsports	Chevrolet
25	Ricky Craven	Hendrick Motorsports	Chevrolet
28	Ernie Irvan	Robert Yates Racing	Ford
29	Jeff Green (R)	Diamond Ridge Motorsports	Chevrolet
30	Johnny Benson Jr.	Bahari Racing	Pontiac
31	Mike Skinner (R)	Richard Childress Racing	Chevrolet
33	Ken Schrader	Andy Petree Racing	Chevrolet
34	Todd Bodine	Team 34	Chevrolet
36	Derrike Cope	MB2 Motorsports	Pontiac
37	Jeremy Mayfield	Kranefuss-Haas Racing	Ford
40	Robby Gordon (R)	Team SABCO	Chevrolet
41	Steve Grissom	Larry Hedrick Motorsports	Chevrolet
42	Joe Nemechek	Team SABCO	Chevrolet
43	Bobby Hamilton	Petty Enterprises	Pontiac
44	Kyle Petty	Petty Enterprises	Pontiac
46	Wally Dallenbach Jr.	Team SABCO	Chevrolet
71	Dave Marcis	Marcis Auto Racing	Chevrolet
75	Rick Mast	Butch Mock Motorsports	Ford
77	Morgan Shepherd	Jasper Motorsports	Ford
78	Bobby Hillin Jr.	Triad Motorsports	Ford
81	Kenny Wallace	FILMAR Racing	Ford
88	Dale Jarrett	Robert Yates Racing	Ford
90	Dorsey Schroeder	Donlavey Racing	Ford
94	Bill Elliott	Bill Elliott Racing	Ford
96	David Green (R)	American Equipment Racing	Chevrolet
97	Chad Little	Mark Rypien Motorsports	Pontiac
98	John Andretti	Cale Yarborough Motorsports	Ford
99	Jeff Burton	Roush Racing	Ford

== Qualifying ==
Qualifying was split into two rounds. The first round was held on Friday, August 8, at 2:00 PM EST. Each driver would have one lap to set a time. During the first round, the top 25 drivers in the round would be guaranteed a starting spot in the race. If a driver was not able to guarantee a spot in the first round, they had the option to scrub their time from the first round and try and run a faster lap time in a second round qualifying run, held on Saturday, August 9, at 10:45 AM EST. As with the first round, each driver would have one lap to set a time. Positions 26-38 would be decided on time, and depending on who needed it, the 39th thru either the 42nd, 43rd, or 44th position would be based on provisionals. Four spots are awarded by the use of provisionals based on owner's points. The fifth is awarded to a past champion who has not otherwise qualified for the race. If no past champion needs the provisional, the field would be limited to 42 cars. If a champion needed it, the field would expand to 43 cars. If the race was a companion race with the NASCAR Winston West Series, four spots would be determined by NASCAR Winston Cup Series provisionals, while the final two spots would be given to teams in the Winston West Series, leaving the field at 44 cars.

Todd Bodine, driving for Team 34, would win the pole, setting a time of 1:13.192 and an average speed of 120.505 mph (193.934 km/h).

Three drivers would fail to qualify: Bobby Hillin Jr., Morgan Shepherd, and Dave Marcis.

=== Full qualifying results ===
Pos.	No.	Driver	Team	Make	Time	Speed
1	34	Todd Bodine	Team 34	Chevrolet	1:13.192	120.505
2	88	Dale Jarrett	Robert Yates Racing	Ford	1:13.253	120.405
3	3	Dale Earnhardt	Richard Childress Racing	Chevrolet	1:13.254	120.403
4	94	Bill Elliott	Bill Elliott Racing	Ford	1:13.308	120.314
5	46	Wally Dallenbach Jr.	Team SABCO	Chevrolet	1:13.308	120.314
6	4	Sterling Marlin	Morgan–McClure Motorsports	Chevrolet	1:13.346	120.252
7	7	Geoff Bodine	Geoff Bodine Racing	Ford	1:13.393	120.175
8	42	Joe Nemechek	Team SABCO	Chevrolet	1:13.403	120.159
9	6	Mark Martin	Roush Racing	Ford	1:13.413	120.142
10	40	Robby Gordon (R)	Team SABCO	Chevrolet	1:13.420	120.131
11	24	Jeff Gordon	Hendrick Motorsports	Chevrolet	1:13.472	120.046
12	14	Steve Park	Dale Earnhardt, Inc.	Chevrolet	1:13.548	119.922
13	2	Rusty Wallace	Penske Racing South	Ford	1:13.602	119.834
14	18	Bobby Labonte	Joe Gibbs Racing	Pontiac	1:13.618	119.808
15	33	Ken Schrader	Andy Petree Racing	Chevrolet	1:13.634	119.782
16	5	Terry Labonte	Hendrick Motorsports	Chevrolet	1:13.654	119.749
17	21	Michael Waltrip	Wood Brothers Racing	Ford	1:13.748	119.596
18	22	Ward Burton	Bill Davis Racing	Pontiac	1:13.787	119.533
19	90	Dorsey Schroeder	Donlavey Racing	Ford	1:13.818	119.483
20	11	Brett Bodine	Brett Bodine Racing	Ford	1:13.911	119.333
21	23	Jimmy Spencer	Travis Carter Enterprises	Ford	1:13.930	119.302
22	28	Ernie Irvan	Robert Yates Racing	Ford	1:13.977	119.226
23	81	Kenny Wallace	FILMAR Racing	Ford	1:14.042	119.122
24	43	Bobby Hamilton	Petty Enterprises	Pontiac	1:14.054	119.102
25	30	Johnny Benson Jr.	Bahari Racing	Pontiac	1:14.121	118.995
26	31	Mike Skinner (R)	Richard Childress Racing	Chevrolet	1:13.870	119.399
27	97	Chad Little	Mark Rypien Motorsports	Pontiac	1:13.953	119.265
28	37	Jeremy Mayfield	Kranefuss-Haas Racing	Ford	1:14.139	118.966
29	16	Ted Musgrave	Roush Racing	Ford	1:14.199	118.870
30	98	John Andretti	Cale Yarborough Motorsports	Ford	1:14.199	118.870
31	10	Ricky Rudd	Rudd Performance Motorsports	Ford	1:14.216	118.842
32	17	Darrell Waltrip	Darrell Waltrip Motorsports	Chevrolet	1:14.256	118.778
33	41	Steve Grissom	Larry Hedrick Motorsports	Chevrolet	1:14.267	118.761
34	1	Lance Hooper	Precision Products Racing	Pontiac	1:14.279	118.742
35	44	Kyle Petty	Petty Enterprises	Pontiac	1:14.339	118.646
36	99	Jeff Burton	Roush Racing	Ford	1:14.375	118.588
37	36	Derrike Cope	MB2 Motorsports	Pontiac	1:14.392	118.561
38	96	David Green (R)	American Equipment Racing	Chevrolet	1:14.491	118.404
Provisionals
39	25	Ricky Craven	Hendrick Motorsports	Chevrolet	-*	-*
40	75	Rick Mast	Butch Mock Motorsports	Ford	-*	-*
41	8	Hut Stricklin	Stavola Brothers Racing	Ford	-*	-*
42	29	Jeff Green (R)	Diamond Ridge Motorsports	Chevrolet	-*	-*
Failed to qualify
43	78	Bobby Hillin Jr.	Triad Motorsports	Ford	-*	-*
44	77	Morgan Shepherd	Jasper Motorsports	Ford	-*	-*
45	71	Dave Marcis	Marcis Auto Racing	Chevrolet	-*	-*
Official qualifying results

*Time not available.

== Race results ==
Fin	St	No.	Driver	Team	Make	Laps	Led	Status	Pts	Winnings
1	11	24	Jeff Gordon	Hendrick Motorsports	Chevrolet	90	32	running	185	$139,120
2	7	7	Geoff Bodine	Geoff Bodine Racing	Ford	90	18	running	175	$71,895
3	13	2	Rusty Wallace	Penske Racing South	Ford	90	2	running	170	$43,810
4	10	40	Robby Gordon (R)	Team SABCO	Chevrolet	90	0	running	160	$39,200
5	9	6	Mark Martin	Roush Racing	Ford	90	0	running	155	$36,700
6	29	16	Ted Musgrave	Roush Racing	Ford	90	0	running	150	$31,500
7	4	94	Bill Elliott	Bill Elliott Racing	Ford	90	4	running	151	$28,080
8	16	5	Terry Labonte	Hendrick Motorsports	Chevrolet	90	1	running	147	$37,505
9	33	41	Steve Grissom	Larry Hedrick Motorsports	Chevrolet	90	0	running	138	$26,575
10	5	46	Wally Dallenbach Jr.	Team SABCO	Chevrolet	90	0	running	134	$16,585
11	25	30	Johnny Benson Jr.	Bahari Racing	Pontiac	90	6	running	135	$25,355
12	8	42	Joe Nemechek	Team SABCO	Chevrolet	90	10	running	132	$18,015
13	6	4	Sterling Marlin	Morgan–McClure Motorsports	Chevrolet	90	0	running	124	$29,725
14	15	33	Ken Schrader	Andy Petree Racing	Chevrolet	90	0	running	121	$24,485
15	28	37	Jeremy Mayfield	Kranefuss-Haas Racing	Ford	90	0	running	118	$17,995
16	3	3	Dale Earnhardt	Richard Childress Racing	Chevrolet	90	0	running	115	$29,575
17	39	25	Ricky Craven	Hendrick Motorsports	Chevrolet	90	0	running	112	$23,755
18	32	17	Darrell Waltrip	Darrell Waltrip Motorsports	Chevrolet	90	3	running	114	$23,535
19	26	31	Mike Skinner (R)	Richard Childress Racing	Chevrolet	90	0	running	106	$16,780
20	30	98	John Andretti	Cale Yarborough Motorsports	Ford	90	0	running	103	$24,885
21	22	28	Ernie Irvan	Robert Yates Racing	Ford	90	0	running	100	$24,455
22	38	96	David Green (R)	American Equipment Racing	Chevrolet	90	0	running	97	$12,335
23	40	75	Rick Mast	Butch Mock Motorsports	Ford	90	0	running	94	$22,540
24	34	1	Lance Hooper	Precision Products Racing	Pontiac	90	0	running	91	$22,380
25	17	21	Michael Waltrip	Wood Brothers Racing	Ford	90	0	running	88	$22,245
26	35	44	Kyle Petty	Petty Enterprises	Pontiac	90	0	running	85	$15,085
27	23	81	Kenny Wallace	FILMAR Racing	Ford	89	0	out of fuel	82	$21,972
28	24	43	Bobby Hamilton	Petty Enterprises	Pontiac	89	0	accident	79	$26,915
29	36	99	Jeff Burton	Roush Racing	Ford	89	0	running	76	$26,855
30	42	29	Jeff Green (R)	Diamond Ridge Motorsports	Chevrolet	89	0	running	73	$14,295
31	19	90	Dorsey Schroeder	Donlavey Racing	Ford	89	0	running	70	$11,630
32	2	88	Dale Jarrett	Robert Yates Racing	Ford	89	14	running	72	$28,365
33	12	14	Steve Park	Dale Earnhardt, Inc.	Chevrolet	88	0	running	64	$11,515
34	21	23	Jimmy Spencer	Travis Carter Enterprises	Ford	88	0	running	61	$18,490
35	1	34	Todd Bodine	Team 34	Chevrolet	87	0	engine	58	$16,465
36	41	8	Hut Stricklin	Stavola Brothers Racing	Ford	77	0	oil leak	55	$18,415
37	14	18	Bobby Labonte	Joe Gibbs Racing	Pontiac	65	0	engine	52	$26,390
38	37	36	Derrike Cope	MB2 Motorsports	Pontiac	64	0	running	49	$11,365
39	20	11	Brett Bodine	Brett Bodine Racing	Ford	56	0	rear end	46	$18,365
40	31	10	Ricky Rudd	Rudd Performance Motorsports	Ford	24	0	transmission	43	$27,865
41	18	22	Ward Burton	Bill Davis Racing	Pontiac	14	0	engine	40	$18,365
42	27	97	Chad Little	Mark Rypien Motorsports	Pontiac	8	0	engine	37	$11,365
Official race results

Previous race: 1997 Brickyard 400	NASCAR Winston Cup Series; 1997 season	Next race: 1997 DeVilbiss 400
