= Busch Light Pole Award =

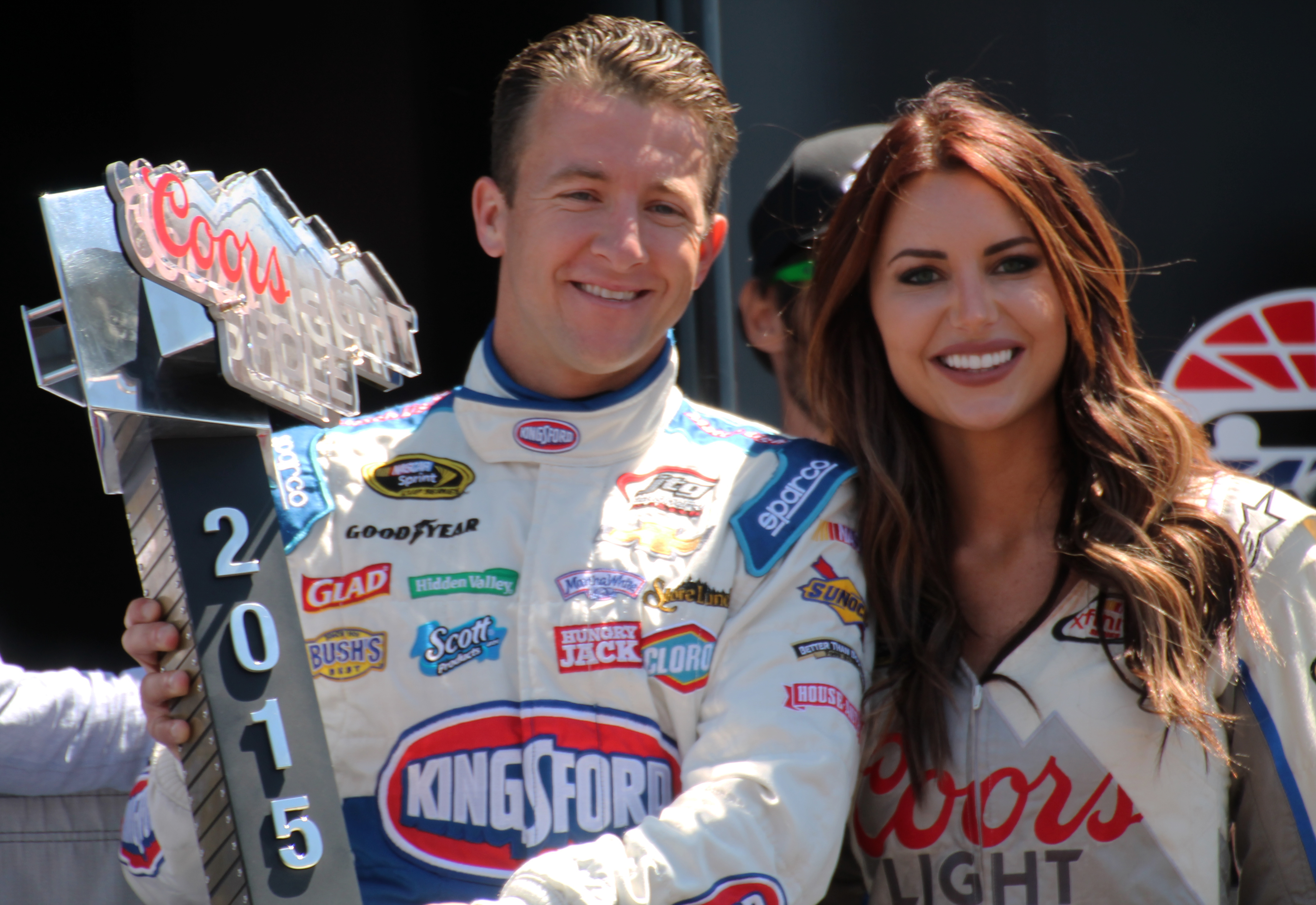
A. J. Allmendinger (left) holding the Pole Award trophy (at the time sponsored by Coors Light) after winning the pole for the 2015 Toyota/Save Mart 350

The Busch Light Pole Award, also called the Anheuser-Busch Pole Award if the driver is under 21 years of age (minimum age for alcohol advertising and consumption), is an award given to the fastest qualifier in each NASCAR national series points-paying race.

The original premise behind the sponsorship was that each driver who won a pole position in the previous Cup Series season was entered in The Clash at Daytona at Daytona International Speedway a week before the season-opening Daytona 500. The Pole Award was not given at events where pole qualifying was rained out and the line-up had to be determined by owner's points.

The award was originally called the Busch Pole Award from 1979 to 1997 and from 2018 to 2021; the name was also used between 2004 and 2007 in the NASCAR Busch Series. It was changed to the Coors Light Pole Award in 2008 and ran through 2017, whereas the NASCAR Camping World Truck Series had the Keystone Light Pole Award or 21 Means 21 Pole Award if the driver was under 21 years of age. From 1998 to 2007, the honor was known as the Budweiser Pole Award.

== History ==
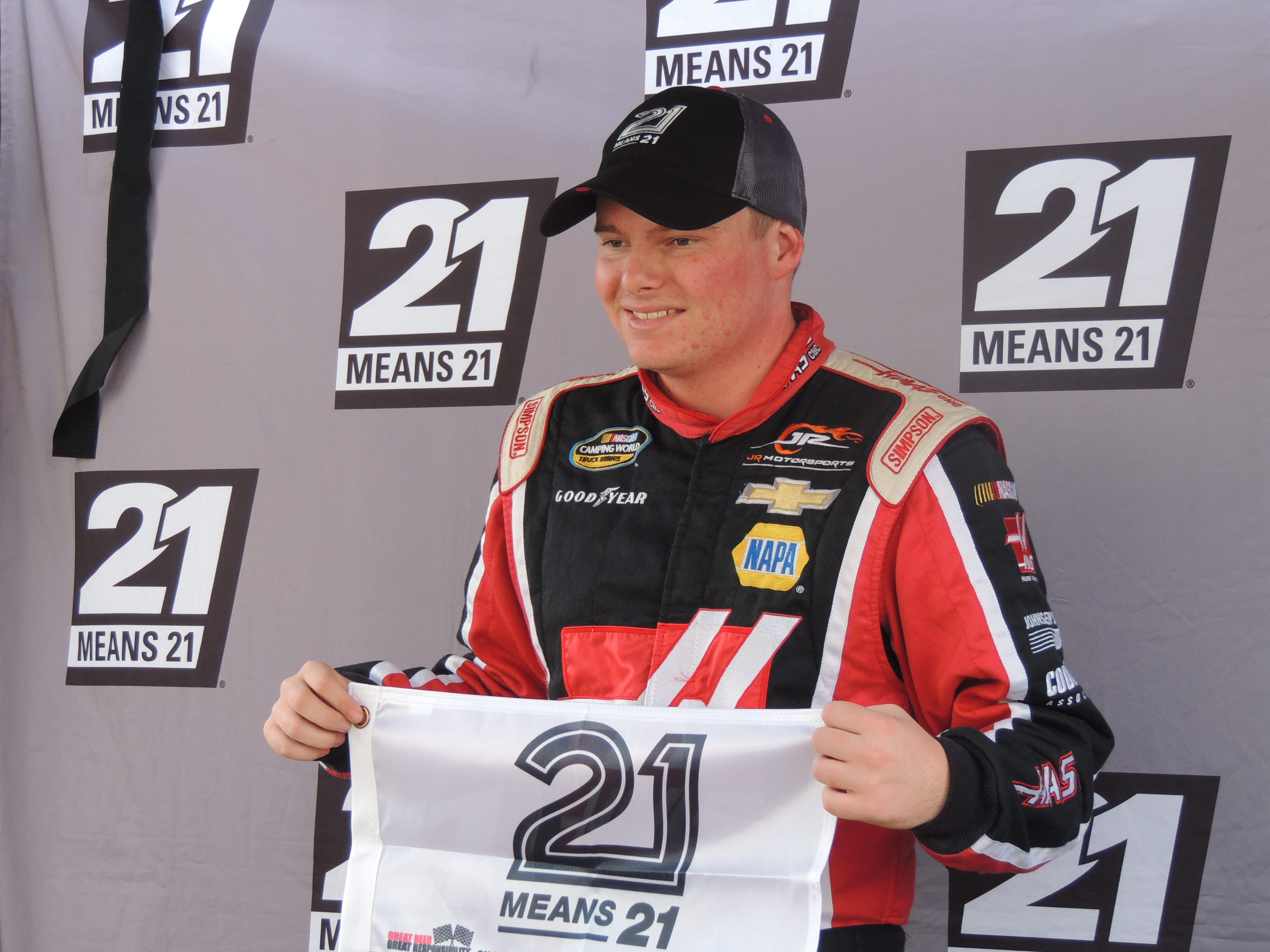
Cole Custer, then 17 years old, holding the 21 Means 21 Pole Award for the 2015 Kroger 200

Initially sponsored by Anheuser-Busch's Busch Beer, the award was transferred over to the Budweiser brand in 1998 (although it reverted back to Busch brand from 2004 to 2007 for the Busch Series, as the Busch brand was at the time the second-tier series' entitlement sponsor). Molson replaced Anheuser-Busch in 2008 as the official beer sponsor, renaming it the Coors Light Pole Award in 2008 after the Canadian brewer's signature beer brand. This ended the connection between the Pole Award and the Shootout, which continued to be sponsored by Budweiser until 2012. Coors Light also did not buy air time during qualifying broadcasts as Budweiser had, so Coors Light has never been the title sponsor for qualifying telecasts as Budweiser had been from 2001–2007. Busch returned as the Pole Award sponsor in March 2018, with several early season races that year ran without a Pole Award sponsor. This was later followed by Busch being designated as one of NASCAR Cup Series' Premier Partners and the sponsor of the Clash in 2020, reuniting the connection.

When Sprint replaced Budweiser as the sponsor of the Clash in 2013, Pole Award winners were once again given a berth in The Clash. When Coors Light Pole Qualifying is rained out, the polesitter would not be given the Coors Light Pole Award and the berth for the Daytona invitational race, the same protocol followed by Budweiser at the time when they gave away a position in the Bud Shootout. However, with the multi-round qualifying format being used starting in 2014, the Coors Light Pole Award and the Clash berth are given out as long as at least one round is completed. An example of this contrast is that at the 2014 Toyota Owners 400, Coors Light Pole Qualifying was completely rained out, giving Kyle Larson the pole position, however he was not given the Coors Light Pole Award or a berth in the 2015 Sprint Unlimited. However, later in the year at the Coke Zero 400, David Gilliland was fastest in round 1 of qualifying, and was given the pole after rounds 2 and 3 were rained out. Because one round of qualifying had been completed, the session was declared official and Gilliland was given the Coors Light Pole Award and the berth in the 2015 Sprint Unlimited, but Gilliland did not participate in that year's race. The berth became irrelevant in 2022 when the race's venue was moved to the Los Angeles Coliseum and the format was changed so that it no longer relied on polesitters. That year, the Busch Pole Award was rebranded to the Busch Light Pole Award. As of the 2025 season, polesitters sign the Busch Light wall brought at the track for qualifying (age permitting).

== Decal ==
As a contingency sponsorship, in order to fully be eligible for the Pole Award, the car must be affixed with the designated sponsor decal. Affixing the decal to the car was optional. (As a comparison, each respective series' decals are required by rules).

If a car did not have the decal affixed, the car/driver would be still scored as the fastest qualifier, and lines up on race day in position 1. The Clash at Daytona berth, unlike in the past, would also go to the driver, since that is determined by NASCAR. The trophy and cash prize goes to the next-fastest driver, provided they carry the decal, who will earn the trophy and cash prize.

The decal issue is seldom an issue except for Petty Enterprises, but not its successor Richard Petty Motorsports/Petty GMS Motorsports, who traditionally refuse to allow alcohol sponsorship on their cars. The No. 43 did not carry the sticker. However, hard alcohol later appeared on other (non-No. 43) cars from the successor teams.

The return of Anheuser-Busch in 2018 coincided with NASCAR moving contingency sponsorship away from the race cars; as such, the Pole Award decal was discontinued that season.
