= Contingency sponsorship =

Form of auto racing sponsorship

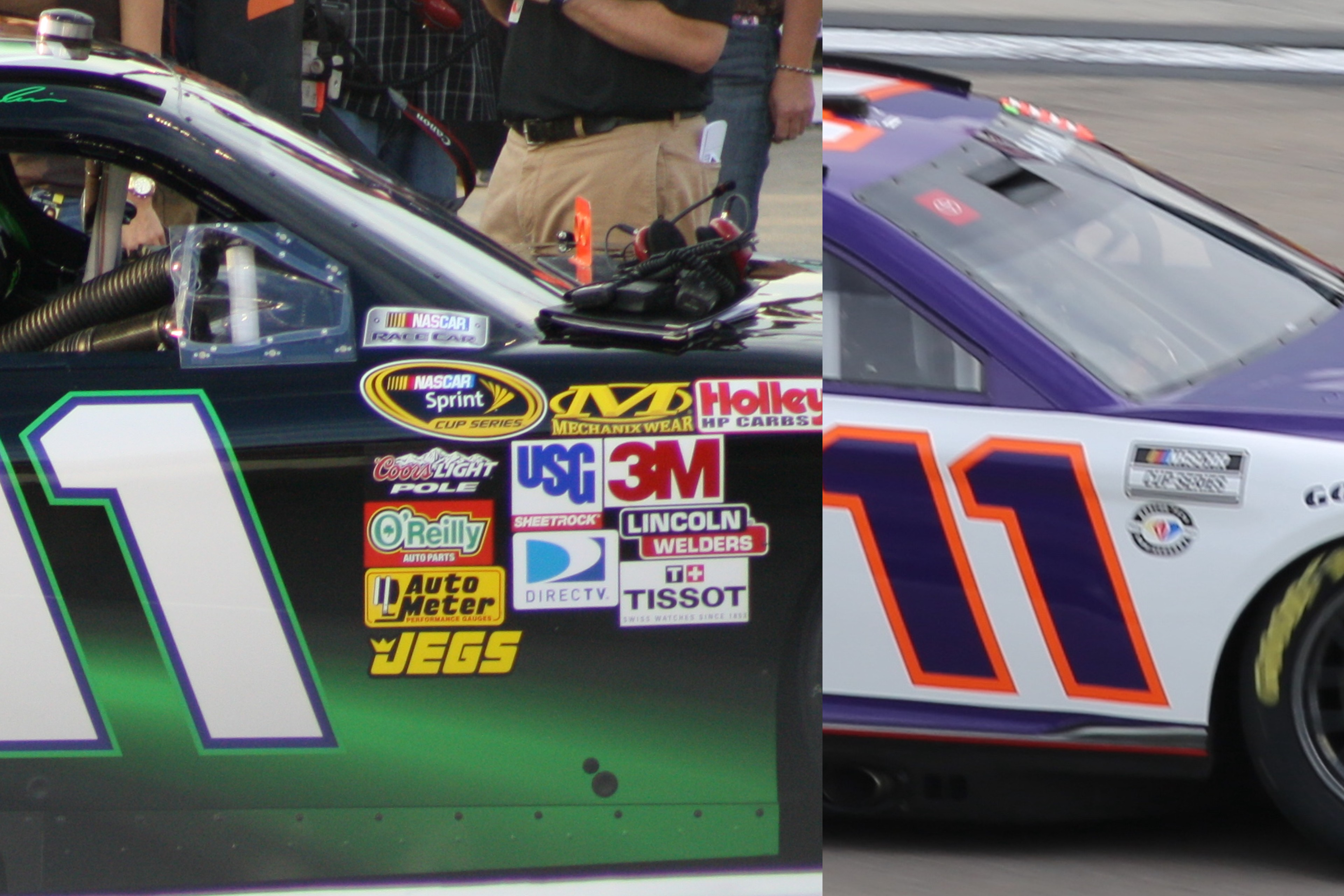
Contingency decals on Denny Hamlin's car in 2009 and the lack of them in 2023.

Common in auto racing, contingency sponsorship is a form of sponsorship whereby race teams place company decals on their vehicles in exchange for awards for winning or meeting certain performance goals. These awards can be monetary, or can include credits for free or discounted equipment.

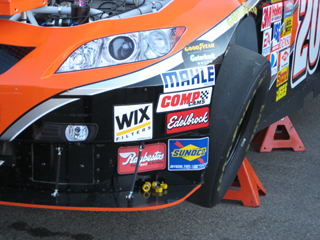
Contingency decals on a NASCAR car

The best known example of a series with many contingency sponsorships was the NASCAR Cup Series. The front fenders of the cars were mottled with rectangular decals that teams are either required or financially encouraged to display. Some of the more lucrative contingencies are the Busch Pole Award and the Sunoco Rookie of the Year Award. In 2018, NASCAR moved away of contingency sponsorship stickers in the cars, instead granting such sponsors online sponsorship assets.

Contingency sponsorship can sometimes include granting the right for the sponsor to use images of the driver and his car in promotional literature and advertising. Some contingencies require the team to use the sponsor's equipment in addition to displaying a decal.
