= Richard Petty Motorsports =

Former American racecar team

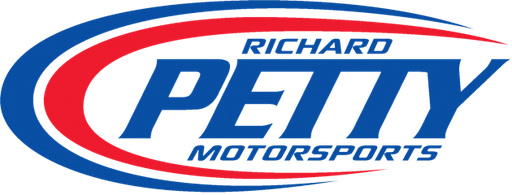
- Owner(s): Richard Petty; Andrew M. Murstein; Douglas G. Bergeron
- Base: Welcome, North Carolina
- Series: NASCAR Cup Series
- Opened: 2009
- Closed: 2021

Career
- Debut: Cup Series; 2009 Daytona 500 (Daytona); Xfinity Series; 2009 NAPA Auto Parts 200 (Circuit Gilles Villeneuve)
- Latest race: Cup Series; 2021 Season Finale 500 (Phoenix Raceway); Xfinity Series; 2016 Hisense 4K TV 300 (Charlotte)
- Races competed: Total: 1,027; Cup Series: 900; Xfinity Series: 127
- Drivers' Championships: Total: 0 Cup Series: 0 Xfinity Series: 0
- Race victories: Total: 7 Cup Series: 5 Xfinity Series: 2
- Pole positions: Total: 10; Cup Series: 9 Xfinity Series: 1

Richard Petty Motorsports (RPM) was an American professional stock car racing team that competed in the NASCAR Cup Series. The team was founded as a result of the merger between Gillett Evernham Motorsports (GEM) and Petty Enterprises, with former Montreal Canadiens and Liverpool F.C. owner George Gillett having a controlling interest in the organization. In late 2009, the team merged with Yates Racing and consequently switched to Ford for the 2010 season. Evernham had no involvement in the team by this time.

After funding issues due to the Gillett family's financial woes, in November 2010, an investment group including Andrew M. Murstein and his Medallion Financial Corporation, Douglas G. Bergeron, and Richard Petty himself, signed and closed sale on racing assets of Richard Petty Motorsports. On December 1, 2021, it was announced that GMS Racing owner Maurice J. Gallagher Jr. had purchased a majority stake of the team, including both charters. The next day, Medallion confirmed it had sold all shares to Gallagher. On December 7, it was confirmed that the combined organization would operate under the banner of Petty GMS Motorsports, which was later renamed Legacy Motor Club.

== Team history ==
In the midst of a struggling economy, in January 2009 Gillett Evernham Motorsports merged with fellow Dodge team Petty Enterprises, which could no longer find sponsors for any of its cars, thus expanding the team to four cars. The organization was renamed Richard Petty Motorsports in the process. Ray Evernham was not involved in the merger negotiations, and both he and Richard Petty only maintained minority shares in the new team. Near the end of the season, the team announced its departure from the Dodge banner and switched to Ford. The team would also merge with Yates Racing, owned by Ford head engine builder Doug Yates, which had fielded several successful NASCAR drivers including Davey Allison, Ernie Irvan, Dale Jarrett, and Ricky Rudd.

By 2010, RPM's continued operation was put into question when lead driver Kasey Kahne announced his departure by the end of the season for Red Bull Racing Team. Kahne would be released by the team before the second Martinsville race with five events left in the season, after several mechanical failures. Kahne's decision was in the midst of financial problems for the Gillett family in several of their ventures, which included George Gillett defaulting on a $90 million loan he had used to purchase the team. With lackluster performance and rumors from week-to-week that the team would shut down, the chaos peaked in October when RPM's cars for the second Talladega race were briefly confiscated, and again in November when RPM's four team haulers remained parked at Texas Motor Speedway instead of heading to the next race at Phoenix, in both cases due to payment issues with engine and equipment supplier Roush Fenway Racing. The situation was resolved in November, when Richard Petty partnered with Medallion Financial (headed by lead investor Andrew M. Murstein) and DGB investments (headed by Douglas G. Bergeron) to purchase the team for "less than $50 million." Petty once again was at the helm of a race team, and retained a one-third stake in the company by investing "several million dollars" of his own. Murstein had been seeking a sports investment since 2008 when he formed a special purpose acquisition company together with Hank Aaron, a Medallion board member, and others worth $215 million. The team contracted from four teams to two following 2010. Bergeron's share was bought out by Murstein at the end of 2014.

In 2015 the team began fabricating its own bodies, and in 2016 began building its own chassis, reducing its technical reliance on Roush Fenway Racing.

For the 2018 season, RPM switched their alliance from RFR to Richard Childress Racing which also came with a manufacturer switch to Chevrolet.

On December 1, 2021, RPM sold a majority interest in the team to GMS Racing for US$19 million. The deal included both of RPM's charters; the No. 43 continued to operate with its charter while the second charter – which was leased to Rick Ware Racing for the No. 51 from 2019 to 2021 would be transferred to GMS' No. 42.

== NASCAR Cup Series ==
=== Car No. 19 history ===
Elliott Sadler (2009–2010)

Prior to the formation of RPM, Elliott Sadler had been driving the No. 19 for Gillett Evernham Motorsports since 2006. In May 2008, Sadler reached a two-year contract extension with GEM. However, on December 27, 2008, GEM announced that A. J. Allmendinger, who drove GEM's No. 10 car at the end of the season, would be replacing Sadler in the No. 19 for the 2009 season. At the same time the team also announced several of its sponsors were considering leaving the team and that Ray Evernham had cleared his personal belongings out of the team's race shop, but it was not clear whether it was related to the hire. On January 3, 2009, Sadler's attorney announced that he would be seeking a breach of contract lawsuit against GEM for the dismissal. Looking to avoid the lawsuit GEM and Sadler's attorneys reached a settlement six days later that would return Sadler to the No. 19 for 2009 while keeping Allmendinger with the team.

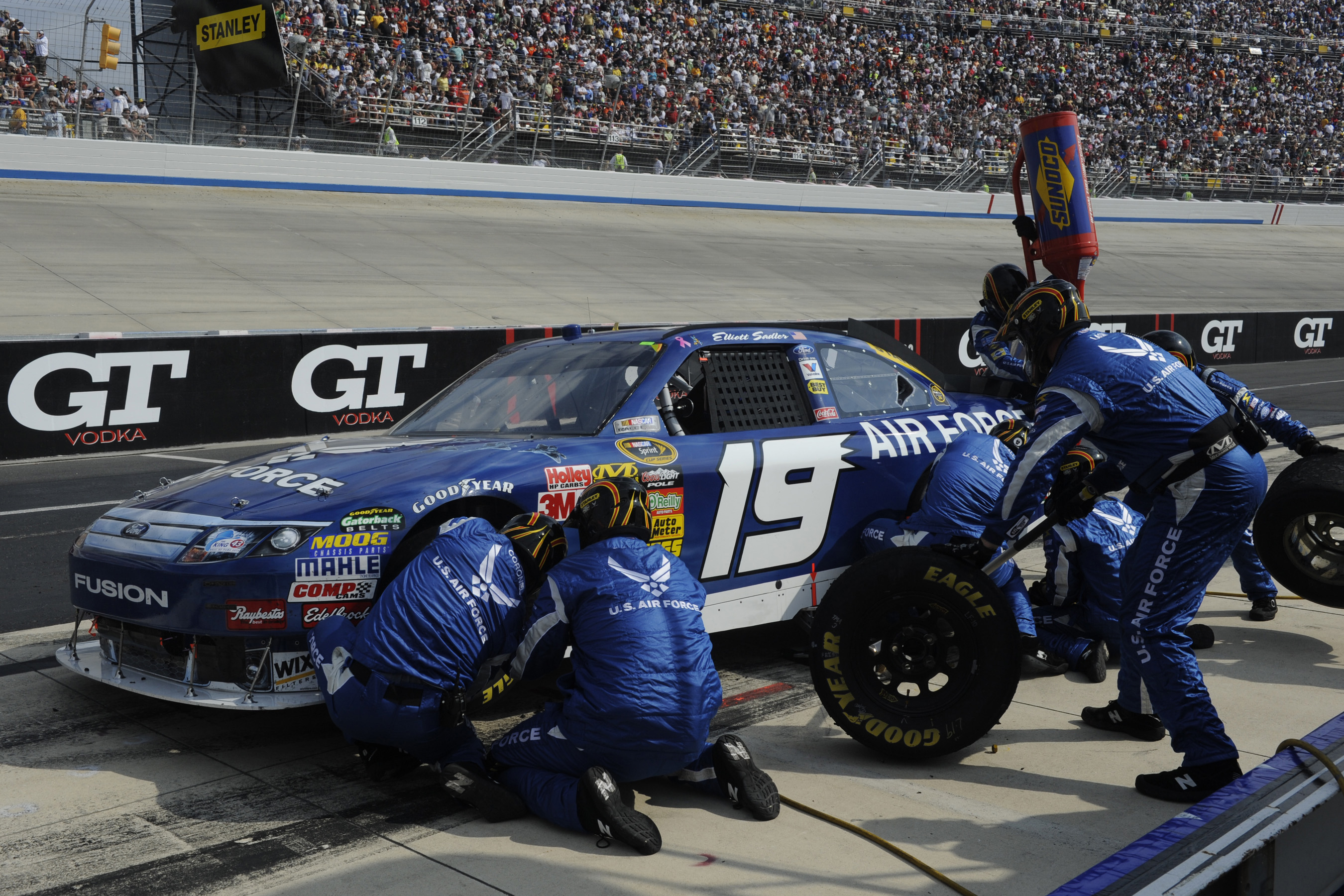
Sadler making a pit stop in his No. 19 RPM car at Dover in 2010

Sadler had five top-ten finishes in 2009, and finished twenty-sixth in points. Stanley was the team's sponsor for all 36 races in 2010. Due to a lack of results, Sadler announced his departure from the team in mid-season allowing this team to shut down. The team was considered to return in 2012 after Richard Childress Racing driver Clint Bowyer was offered a contract, but RPM withdrew their offer by September, with Bowyer accepting a 3-year contract with Michael Waltrip Racing to drive the No. 15 5-hour Energy Toyota Camry. Since then, the team has remained inactive. The number 19 would later be reassigned by NASCAR to Humphrey Smith Racing (which used the 19 in the now-Xfinity Series as TriStar Motorsports), and has since moved again to Joe Gibbs Racing.

==== Car No. 19 results ====
Year	Driver	No.	Make	1	2	3	4	5	6	7	8	9	10	11	12	13	14	15	16	17	18	19	20	21	22	23	24	25	26	27	28	29	30	31	32	33	34	35	36	Owners	Pts
2009	Elliott Sadler	19	Dodge	DAY; 5	CAL; 25	LVS; 29	ATL; 20	BRI; 20	MAR; 31	TEX; 32	PHO; 32	TAL; 19	RCH; 25	DAR; 14	CLT; 31	DOV; 27	POC; 25	MCH; 12	SON; 10	NHA; 26	DAY; 10	CHI; 27	IND; 40	POC; 24	GLN; 32	MCH; 25	BRI; 26	ATL; 21	RCH; 34	NHA; 8	DOV; 30	KAN; 20	CAL; 32	CLT; 26	MAR; 21	TAL; 9	TEX; 22	PHO; 28	HOM; 41	26th	3350
2010	Elliott Sadler	19	Ford	DAY; 24	CAL; 24	LVS; 27	ATL; 19	BRI; 20	MAR; 24	PHO; 31	TEX; 18	TAL; 33	RCH; 38	DAR; 21	DOV; 28	CLT; 21	POC; 31	MCH; 21	SON; 17	NHA; 19	DAY; 22	CHI; 21	IND; 38	POC; 34	GLN; 29	MCH; 9	BRI; 29	ATL; 41	RCH; 27	NHA; 21	DOV; 17	KAN; 28	CAL; 13	CLT; 26	MAR; 28	TAL; 14	TEX; 23	PHO; 28	HOM; 28	27th	3234

=== Car No. 43 history ===
Reed Sorenson (2009)

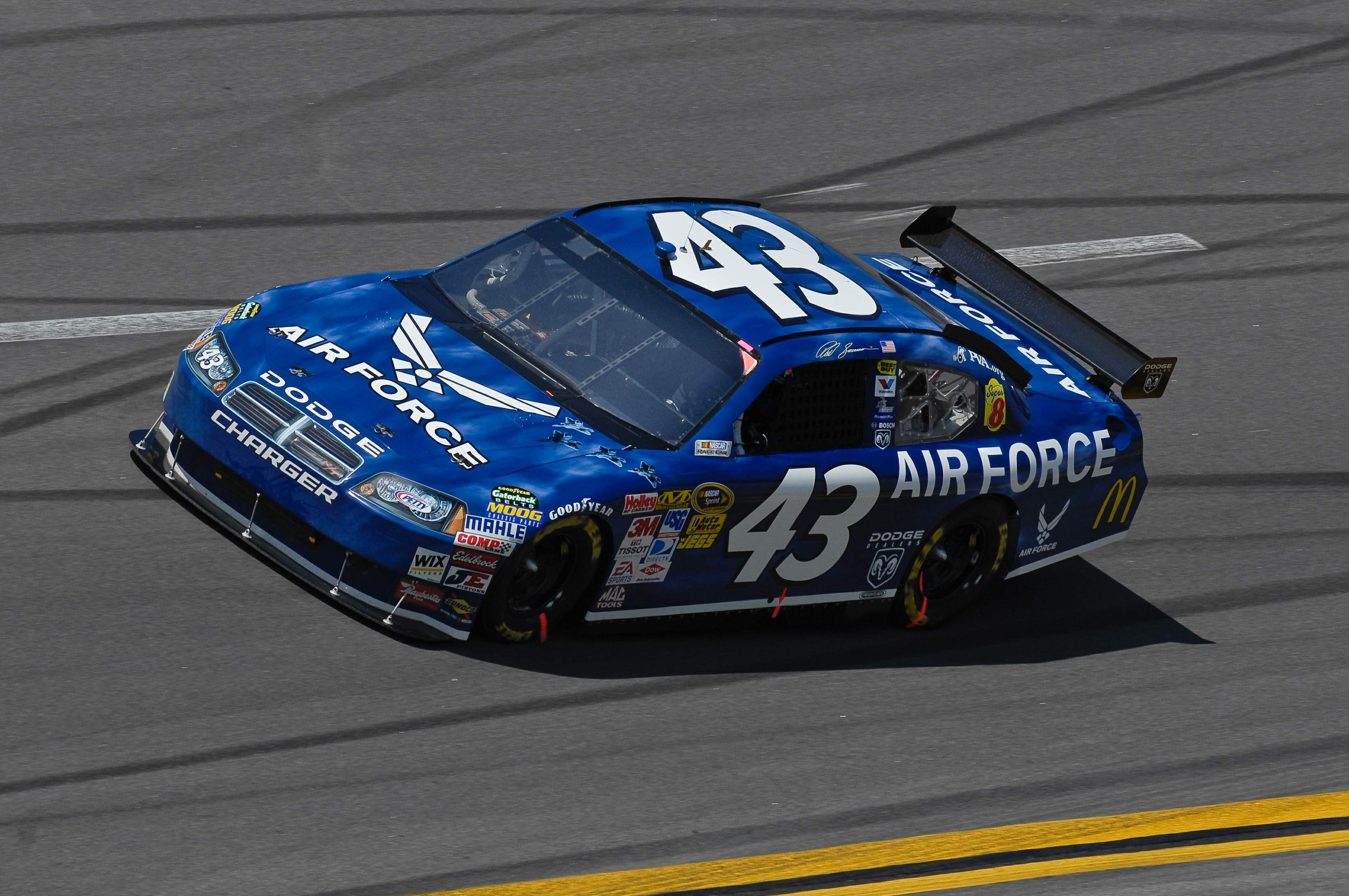
Sorenson's No. 43 during the 2009 Aaron's 499

On August 26, 2008, Gillett Evernham Motorsports announced the signing of Reed Sorenson to a multi-year contract to drive the No. 10 car. On Thursday January 9, it was announced that Richard Petty would sell his team to GEM, moving Sorenson to the No. 43 for the 2009 season in the process. The 43 ran multiple sponsorships from McDonald's, Valvoline, the United States Air Force, Super 8, Reynolds Wrap, Paralyzed Veterans of America, Charter Communications, Auto Value Bumper to Bumper, Liberty Medical, and Siemens, but only had one top-ten finish; a ninth at the rained-shortened Daytona 500. Sorenson was released the end of the season.

A. J. Allmendinger (2010–2011)

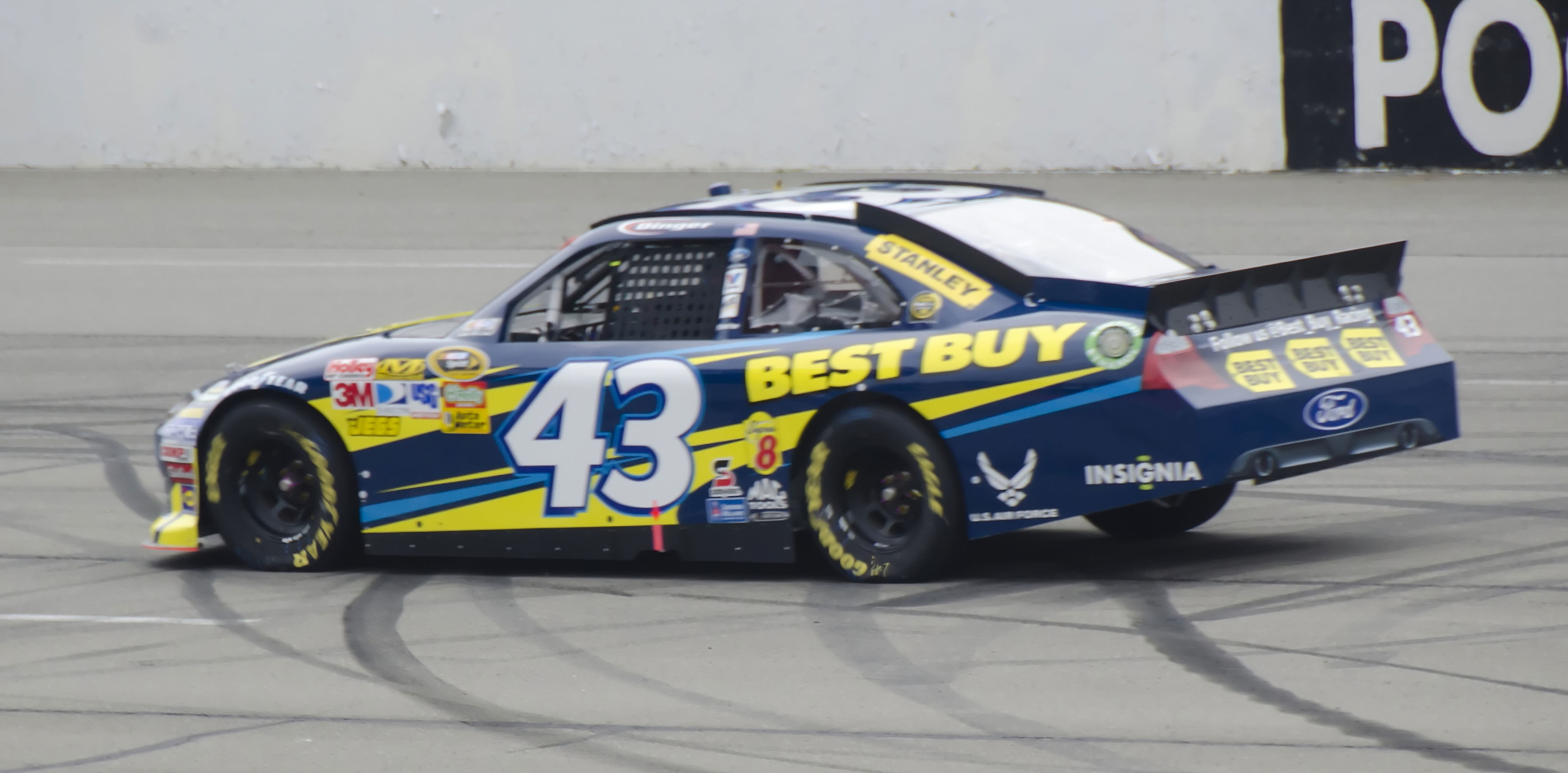
A. J. Allmendinger in the No. 43 at Pocono Raceway in 2011

The team announced they had moved A. J. Allmendinger over to the No. 43 car for the 2010 season; he finished 19th in the points. In 2011, Allmendinger showed continued improvement, especially when he was paired with former Roush Fenway Racing crew chief Greg Erwin. The team would finish 15th in points, but it was not enough to retain Best Buy as a primary sponsor. As a result, Allmendinger was granted a release from RPM and he soon joined Penske Racing.

Aric Almirola (2012–2017)

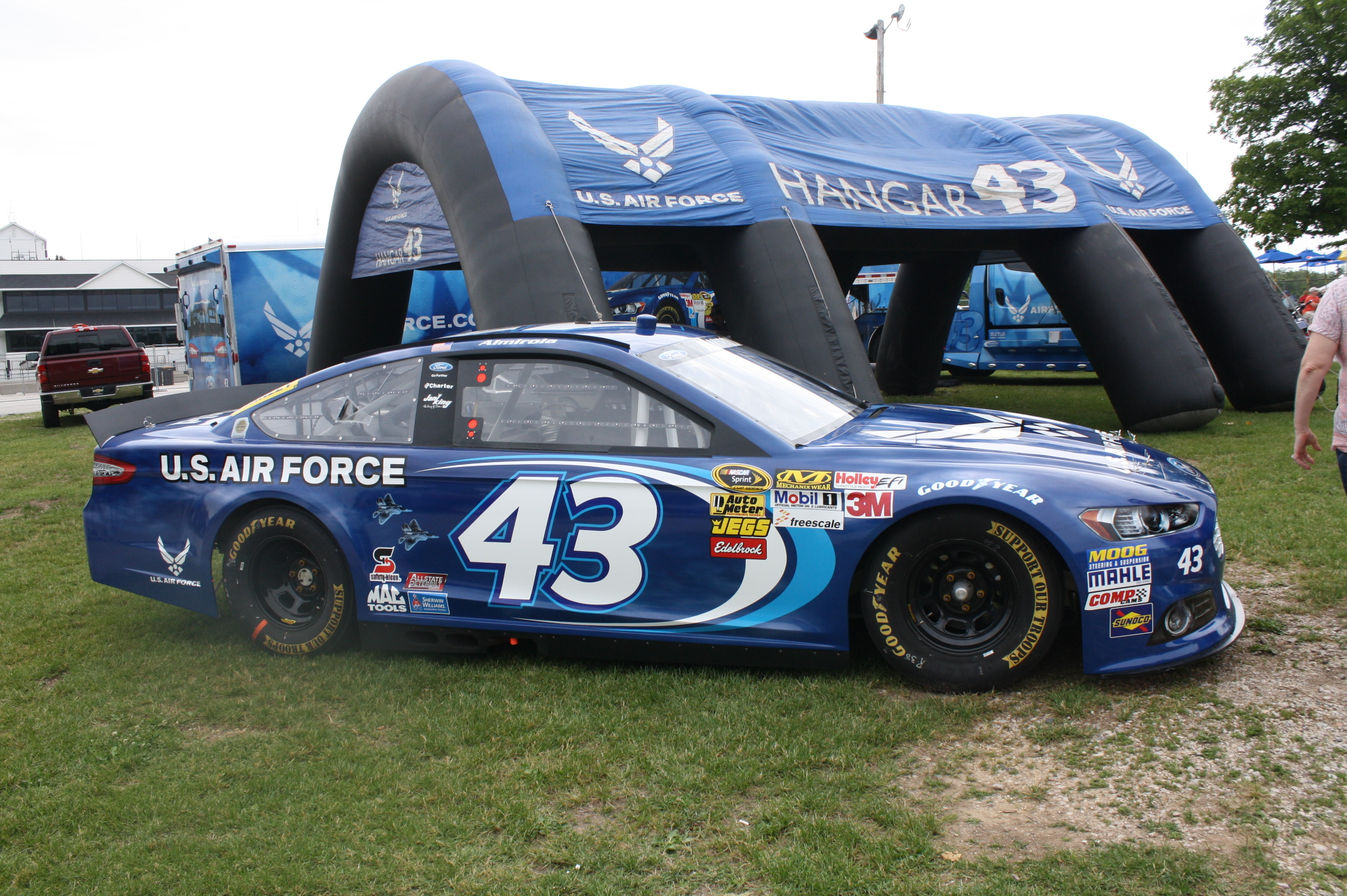
Almirola's 2013 Sprint Cup car, the same Air Force scheme he took to victory lane at Daytona in 2014

To replace Allmendinger, RPM signed Aric Almirola, who had replaced Kasey Kahne in the 9 car at the end of the 2010 season. Almirola earned a Pole start at Charlotte in May, and collected one top 5 and four top 10s en route to a 20th-place finish in points. Aric's best run of the year may have been at Kansas in October, where he qualified fifth and lead 69 laps after taking the top spot on lap 6. But on lap 121, Almirola blew a tire, sending his Farmland Ford into the wall. He spun on lap 172 racing for the lead and lost a lap on pit road. After getting his lap back and working his way up to 13th, Almirola hit the wall once again, setting the front of the car ablaze and ending the promising run.

In 2013 Almirola returned to the No. 43; at Martinsville Speedway in October, the team ran the No. 41 to honor Maurice Petty's induction into the NASCAR Hall of Fame. During the 2013 season from Martinsville to Darlington, Almirola had the most consecutive Top 10s in the 43 car since Bobby Hamilton in 1996. After being fastest in practice in Talladega, his crew chief Todd Parrott was suspended for violating NASCAR's substance abuse policy. Almirola finished a career high 18th in points. For 2014, the team hired Trent Owens, Richard Petty's nephew as crew chief.

In January 2014, RPM announced a three-year contract extension with Almirola after working on one-year deals the previous two seasons. This coincided with sponsor Smithfield Foods stepping up to fund 29 races in each the next three seasons with brands Smithfield, Farmland, Eckrich, and Gwaltney. Almirola had a rather slow start to 2014, being involved in a 12 car wreck in the 2014 Daytona 500. At Bristol, Almirola posted his best career finish to date of 3rd, only behind winner Carl Edwards and Ricky Stenhouse Jr.

The next week at Auto Club Speedway during the 2014 Auto Club 400, Almirola got involved in an accident with part-time Cup driver Brian Scott. Almirola made a pass on Scott for 4th place. Scott controversially moved into the back of Almirola to wreck himself and Almirola. In a post-race interview, an angry Almirola retorted "The 33 was obviously a dart without feathers and coming across the race track. He ran right into me. Man, he came from all the way at the bottom of the race track and ran into me. He's not even racing this series for points. He's out there having fun because his daddy gets to pay for it and he wrecked us. That's frustrating."

At the 2014 Coke Zero 400, Almirola would earn his first career win in the Sprint Cup Series after avoiding two major wrecks, and leading the field when the race was called off after 112 laps due to rain. His win also marked the first victory by the Richard Petty Motorsports No. 43, the first victory for the No. 43 overall in Cup since Petty Enterprises' win at Martinsville in 1999, and 30 years to the day Richard Petty won his 200th race in a Curb Racing No. 43. On his big victory Almirola said "The good Lord was watching out for us today and we were meant to win. It's real special for me to win here. This is not only the 30th anniversary of this team's last win at Daytona, it is my hometown and I remember growing up watching Daytona 500s and Firecracker 400s here. To win is real special." Almirola's win guaranteed him a spot in the newly reformatted Chase for the sprint cup. He was eliminated after the Round of 16 due to a crash at Dover.

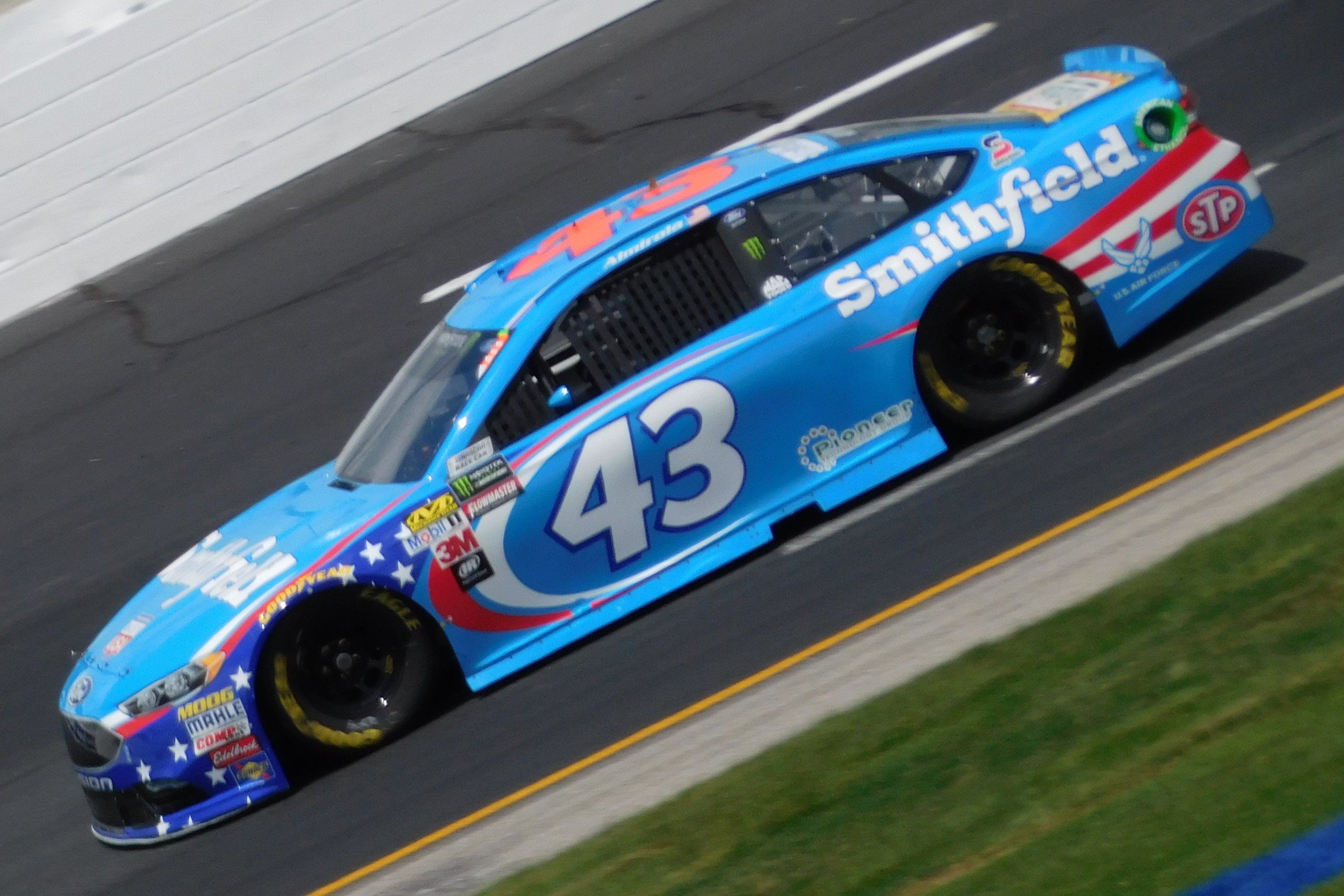
Aric Almirola in the No. 43 at New Hampshire Motor Speedway in 2017

Longtime teammate Marcos Ambrose left the team in 2015, and he was replaced by Sam Hornish Jr. as the driver of Petty's other entry. Almirola scored a top-five finish at Dover early in the season but then barely missed out on the Chase in points, finishing sixteen points and one position behind the last man in, Clint Bowyer. Almirola finished fourth in the cut race, doing everything he could to make it in. Despite missing the playoffs, Almirola scored another top-five at Dover, a track that the team had traditionally been strong at. He wound up finishing seventeenth in points, top of the non-Chase field.

For the 2016 season Hornish was replaced by Brian Scott, whom Almirola had previously tangled with in his career. Almirola said that he felt "more excited than ever" and was confident that his extended pairing with crew chief Owens would yield good results. However, after a strong 12th place showing in the 2016 Daytona 500, the team went into a slump, highlighted by last-place finishes at Martinsville, Kansas and in the season's final race at Homestead-Miami. Almirola finished the 2016 season with an average finish of just over 23rd and a 26th-place points finish. After the 2016 season, RPM announced that they would lease the charter of the 44 team and focus solely on Almirola's effort.

The one-car approach paid immediate dividends as Almirola recorded a top ten finish in the 2017 Daytona 500. However, in the season's eleventh race, the 2017 Go Bowling 400, Almirola was caught in a wreck caused by Joey Logano. After Logano lost control of his car and collided with Danica Patrick's car, Almirola's car plowed into Logano's and the back end of the car left the ground. Almirola was then immediately airlifted to a hospital, where he would later be diagnosed with a shattered T5 vertebrae, for which he would miss eight to twelve races. Regan Smith was named as the replacement for the NASCAR All-Star Race, racing until the AAA Drive for Autism at Dover. Roush Fenway Racing's Xfinity Series driver Bubba Wallace made his Cup Series debut in the No. 43, driving the car until Almirola was fit to return to racing. Ford sports car racer Billy Johnson drove the No. 43 at Sonoma. Almirola returned to the car at New Hampshire Motor Speedway in July. In September 2017, it was announced that Almirola and Smithfield Foods were leaving Richard Petty Motorsports for Stewart–Haas Racing after negotiations to extend the sponsorship deal fell through, although after Petty threatened legal action, Smithfield reached a settlement in which their subsidiary brands such as Food Lion Feeds and Farmer John would sponsor the No. 43 for a portion of the 2018 season.

Bubba Wallace (2018–2020)

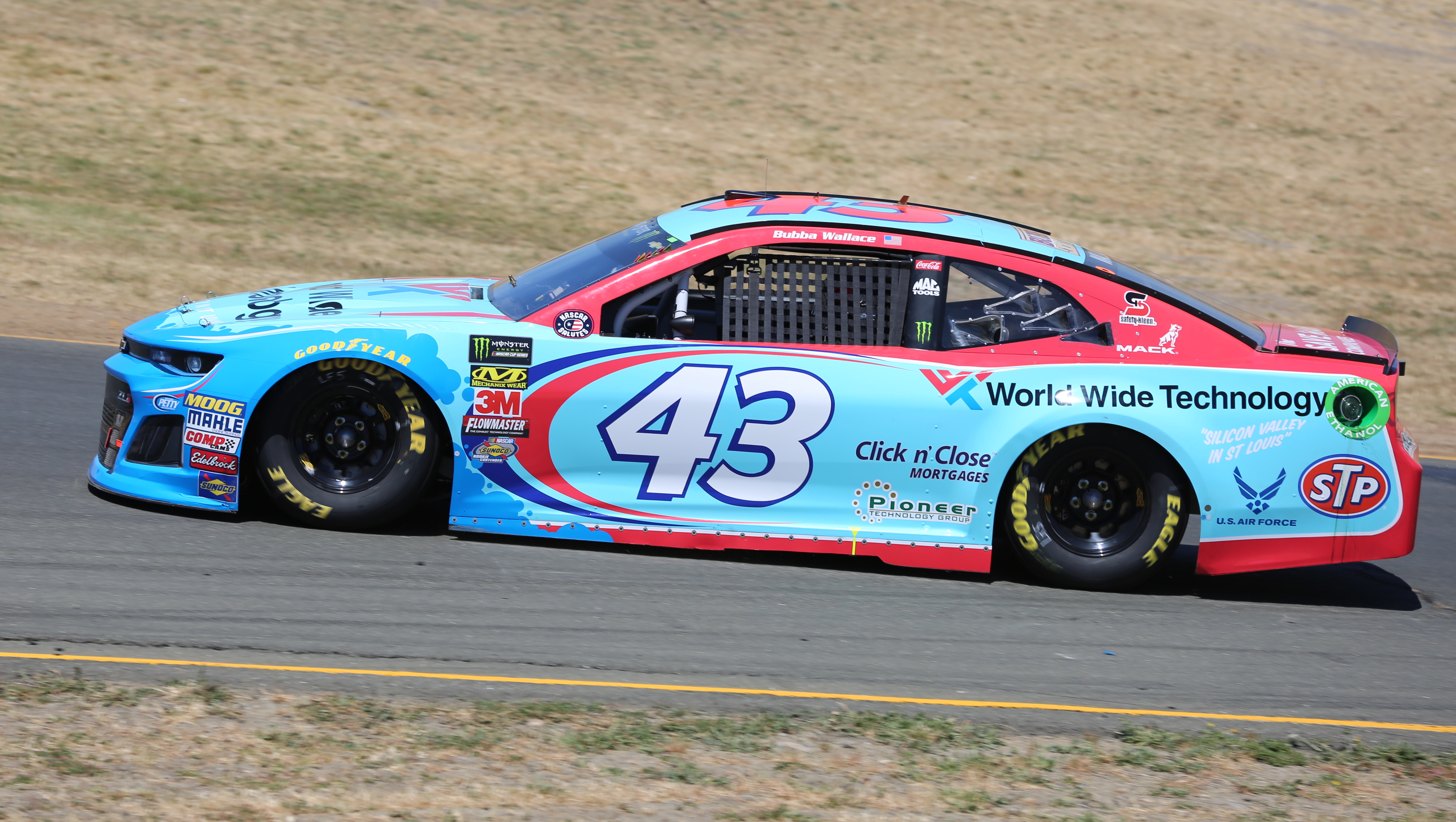
Bubba Wallace in the No. 43 at Sonoma Raceway in 2018

For the 2018 season, Wallace replaced Almirola in the No. 43 car who ran for Rookie of the Year honors. He got an impressive second-place finish at the 2018 Daytona 500. On May 1, 2018, World Wide Technology signed on to sponsor the No. 43 car for six races. Wallace finished the season 28th in points and finished 2nd in the Rookie of the Year honors.

Wallace started the 2019 season with a 38th-place finish at the 2019 Daytona 500 when Kurt Busch spun in front of him and Tyler Reddick hit him from behind, causing Wallace to collide with Busch. Wallace continued to finish consistently below the top-15, but he managed to make the starting grid of the 2019 Monster Energy NASCAR All-Star Race by winning stage 2 of the Monster Energy Open. At the 2019 Brickyard 400 Wallace managed to run top 10 the majority of the day and compete for the win with around 10 to go and would go on to finish third. On November 9, Wallace was fined $50,000 and docked 50 points for intentionally manipulating competition at Texas when he spun his car on the track after experiencing a tire failure.

On September 10, 2020, Wallace announced that he would not return to RPM in 2021.

Erik Jones (2021)

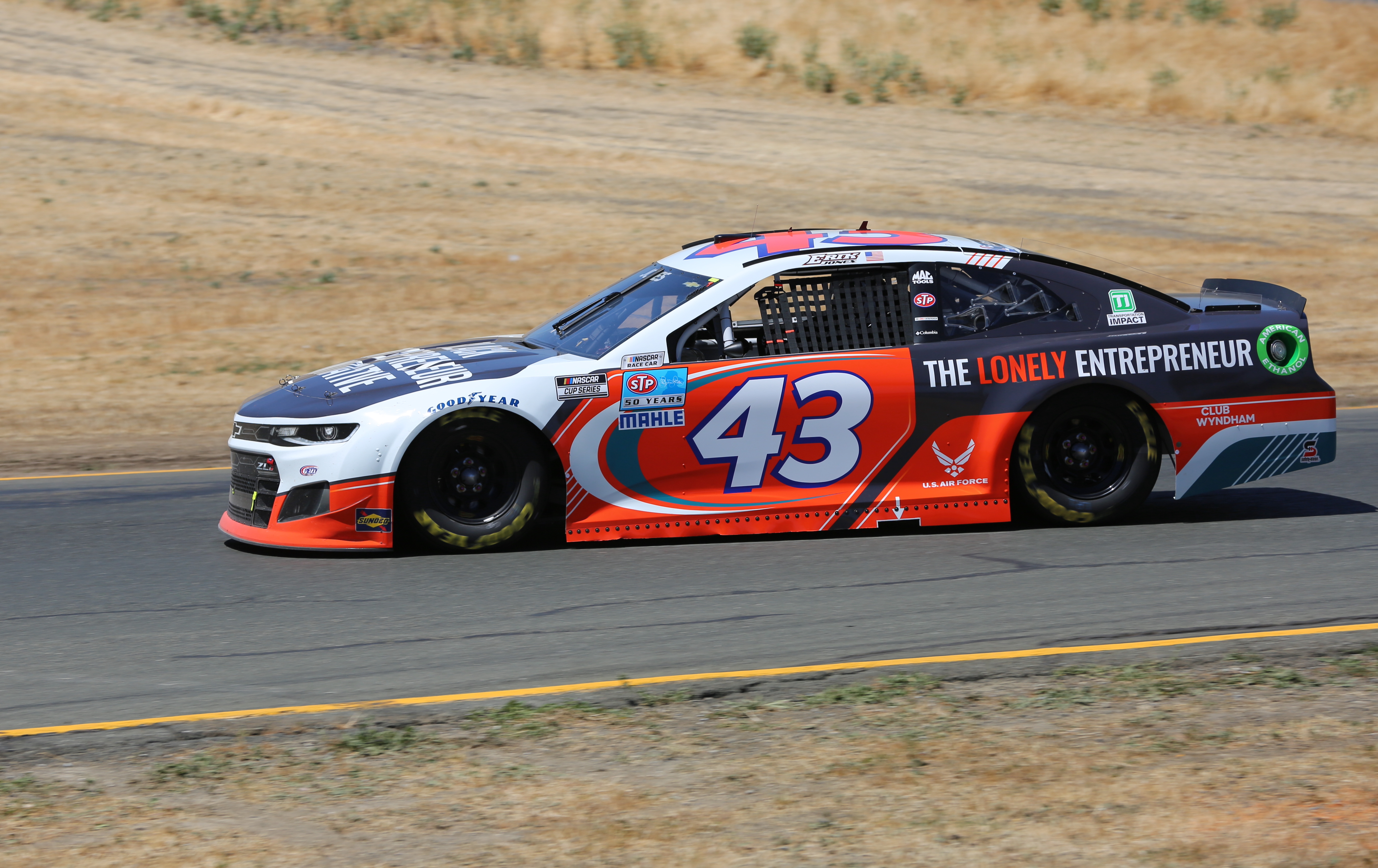
Erik Jones in the No. 43 at Sonoma Raceway in 2021

On October 21, 2020, it was announced that RPM had signed Erik Jones to a multi-year contract to drive the 43 car. During the 2021 season, Jones scored six top-10s and finished 24th in the points standings.

==== Car No. 43 results ====
Year	Driver	No.	Make	1	2	3	4	5	6	7	8	9	10	11	12	13	14	15	16	17	18	19	20	21	22	23	24	25	26	27	28	29	30	31	32	33	34	35	36	Owners	Pts
2009	Reed Sorenson	43	Dodge	DAY; 9	CAL; 21	LVS; 34	ATL; 33	BRI; 23	MAR; 17	TEX; 36	PHO; 12	TAL; 11	RCH; 20	DAR; 19	CLT; 35	DOV; 19	POC; 20	MCH; 27	SON; 40	NHA; 17	DAY; 33	CHI; 24	IND; 13	POC; 35	GLN; 31	MCH; 29	BRI; 19	ATL; 27	RCH; 16	NHA; 36	DOV; 35	KAN; 26	CAL; 31	CLT; 21	MAR; 24	TAL; 16	TEX; 36	PHO; 26	HOM; 40	29th	3147
2010	A. J. Allmendinger	43	Ford	DAY; 32	CAL; 25	LVS; 25	ATL; 6	BRI; 17	MAR; 38	PHO; 15	TEX; 13	TAL; 19	RCH; 17	DAR; 37	DOV; 14	CLT; 14	POC; 10	MCH; 11	SON; 13	NHA; 10	DAY; 36	CHI; 14	IND; 16	POC; 24	GLN; 4	MCH; 17	BRI; 31	ATL; 18	RCH; 8	NHA; 12	DOV; 10	KAN; 10	CAL; 19	CLT; 25	MAR; 12	TAL; 32	TEX; 14	PHO; 18	HOM; 5	19th	3998
2011	A. J. Allmendinger	43	Ford	DAY; 11	PHO; 9	LVS; 19	BRI; 31	CAL; 14	MAR; 14	TEX; 19	TAL; 11	RCH; 7	DAR; 20	DOV; 37	CLT; 5	KAN; 27	POC; 25	MCH; 13	SON; 13	DAY; 10	KEN; 28	NHA; 12	IND; 22	POC; 19	GLN; 8	MCH; 11	BRI; 12	ATL; 10	RCH; 11	CHI; 27	NHA; 21	DOV; 7	KAN; 25	CLT; 7	TAL; 31	MAR; 11	TEX; 10	PHO; 6	HOM; 15	15th	1013
2012	Aric Almirola	43	Ford	DAY; 33	PHO; 12	LVS; 24	BRI; 19	CAL; 25	MAR; 8	TEX; 22	KAN; 23	RCH; 26	TAL; 12	DAR; 19	CLT; 16	DOV; 6	POC; 28	MCH; 17	SON; 28	KEN; 26	DAY; 19	NHA; 28	IND; 19	POC; 19	GLN; 18	MCH; 20	BRI; 35	ATL; 32	RCH; 26	CHI; 17	NHA; 23	DOV; 19	TAL; 19	CLT; 12	KAN; 29	MAR; 4	TEX; 15	PHO; 16	HOM; 7	20th	868
2013	Aric Almirola	43	Ford	DAY; 13	PHO; 15	LVS; 16	BRI; 37	CAL; 14	MAR; 20	TEX; 7	KAN; 8	RCH; 8	TAL; 10	DAR; 20	CLT; 33	DOV; 18	POC; 21	MCH; 17	SON; 20	KEN; 15	DAY; 38	NHA; 5	IND; 17	POC; 20	GLN; 37	MCH; 18	BRI; 15	ATL; 20	RCH; 20	CHI; 13	NHA; 21	DOV; 22	KAN; 10	CLT; 23	TAL; 22		TEX; 27	PHO; 19	HOM; 16	18th	913
2013	Aric Almirola	41	Ford																																	MAR; 20				18th	913
2014	Aric Almirola	43	Ford	DAY; 39	PHO; 15	LVS; 25	BRI; 3	CAL; 43	MAR; 8	TEX; 12	DAR; 24	RCH; 17	TAL; 13	KAN; 8	CLT; 11	DOV; 12	POC; 22	MCH; 31	SON; 23	KEN; 39	DAY; 1	NHA; 23	IND; 21	POC; 35	GLN; 18	MCH; 20	BRI; 41	ATL; 9	RCH; 10	CHI; 41	NHA; 6	DOV; 28	KAN; 31	CLT; 22	TAL; 39	MAR; 21	TEX; 24	PHO; 18	HOM; 19	16th	2195
2015	Aric Almirola	43	Ford	DAY; 15	ATL; 11	LVS; 26	PHO; 19	CAL; 11	MAR; 12	TEX; 19	BRI; 13	RCH; 20	TAL; 15	KAN; 11	CLT; 17	DOV; 5	POC; 43	MCH; 22	SON; 14	DAY; 34	KEN; 12	NHA; 15	IND; 38	POC; 18	GLN; 16	MCH; 14	BRI; 17	DAR; 11	RCH; 4	CHI; 10	NHA; 43	DOV; 5	CLT; 10	KAN; 24	TAL; 16	MAR; 16	TEX; 18	PHO; 10	HOM; 41	17th	940
2016	Aric Almirola	43	Ford	DAY; 12	ATL; 15	LVS; 24	PHO; 13	CAL; 21	MAR; 40	TEX; 24	BRI; 34	RCH; 21	TAL; 27	KAN; 18	DOV; 31	CLT; 26	POC; 20	MCH; 26	SON; 27	DAY; 15	KEN; 20	NHA; 19	IND; 25	POC; 39	GLN; 27	BRI; 14	MCH; 24	DAR; 32	RCH; 17	CHI; 32	NHA; 17	DOV; 16	CLT; 15	KAN; 40	TAL; 8	MAR; 15	TEX; 22	PHO; 22	HOM; 40	27th	638
2017	Aric Almirola	43	Ford	DAY; 4	ATL; 27	LVS; 14	PHO; 17	CAL; 19	MAR; 18	TEX; 18	BRI; 22	RCH; 9	TAL; 4	KAN; 38								NHA; 24	IND; 13	POC; 38	GLN; 21	MCH; 12	BRI; 37	DAR; 20	RCH; 17	CHI; 24	NHA; 26	DOV; 25	CLT; 24	TAL; 5	KAN; 9	MAR; 18	TEX; 15	PHO; 9	HOM; 18	24th	614
2017	Regan Smith	43	Ford												CLT; 22	DOV; 34																								24th	614
2017	Bubba Wallace	43	Ford														POC; 26	MCH; 19		DAY; 15	KEN; 11																			24th	614
2017	Billy Johnson	43	Ford																SON; 22																					24th	614
2018	Bubba Wallace	43	Chevy	DAY; 2	ATL; 32	LVS; 21	PHO; 28	CAL; 20	MAR; 34	TEX; 8	BRI; 16	RCH; 25	TAL; 16	DOV; 25	KAN; 23	CLT; 16	POC; 38	MCH; 19	SON; 29	CHI; 23	DAY; 14	KEN; 27	NHA; 24	POC; 33	GLN; 25	MCH; 23	BRI; 38	DAR; 26	IND; 38	LVS; 38	RCH; 27	CLT; 36	DOV; 23	TAL; 19	KAN; 26	MAR; 34	TEX; 25	PHO; 10	HOM; 21	30th	471
2019	Bubba Wallace	43	Chevy	DAY; 38	ATL; 27	LVS; 26	PHO; 22	CAL; 30	MAR; 17	TEX; 23	BRI; 20	RCH; 27	TAL; 39	DOV; 27	KAN; 29	CLT; 25	POC; 21	MCH; 28	SON; 26	CHI; 25	DAY; 15	KEN; 23	NHA; 22	POC; 22	GLN; 28	MCH; 27	BRI; 14	DAR; 24	IND; 3	LVS; 23	RCH; 12	CLT; 24	DOV; 20	TAL; 24	KAN; 35	MAR; 13	TEX; 24	PHO; 25	HOM; 34	28th	437
2020	Bubba Wallace	43	Chevy	DAY; 15	LVS; 6	CAL; 27	PHO; 19	DAR; 21	DAR; 16	CLT; 38	CLT; 37	BRI; 10	ATL; 21	MAR; 11	HOM; 13	TAL; 14	POC; 22	POC; 20	IND; 9	KEN; 27	TEX; 14	KAN; 37	NHA; 23	MCH; 9	MCH; 21	DAY; 25	DOV; 27	DOV; 21	DAY; 5	DAR; 38	RCH; 26	BRI; 22	LVS; 28	TAL; 24	CLT; 21	KAN; 18	TEX; 38	MAR; 21	PHO; 15	24th	597
2021	Erik Jones	43	Chevy	DAY; 39	DAY; 14	HOM; 27	LVS; 10	PHO; 20	ATL; 24	BRI; 9	MAR; 30	RCH; 19	TAL; 27	KAN; 25	DAR; 18	DOV; 22	COA; 16	CLT; 16	SON; 11	NSH; 19	POC; 22	POC; 31	ROA; 19	ATL; 24	NHA; 19	GLN; 27	IND; 7	MCH; 18	DAY; 11	DAR; 32	RCH; 21	BRI; 8	LVS; 26	TAL; 9	CLT; 17	TEX; 12	KAN; 29	MAR; 8	PHO; 22	24th	641

=== Car No. 44 history ===
==== 2009–2015: No. 9 ====
Kasey Kahne and Aric Almirola (2009–2010)

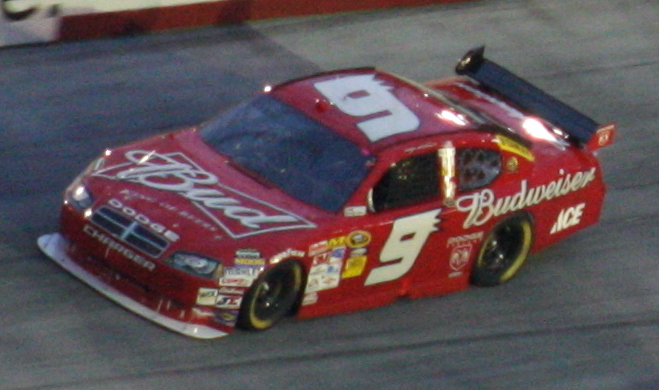
Kasey Kahne at Bristol Motor Speedway in 2009

Kasey Kahne had been driving for Evernham Motorsports since his rookie season in 2004. Kahne continued to drive the No. 9 car after the merger between Gillett Evernham Motorsports and Petty Enterprises. In 2009, Kahne scored his first road course victory at the Toyota/Save Mart 350 and won again at Atlanta on Labor Day, earning him a berth in the Chase. However, early misfortune at Loudon put the No. 9 team out of contention for the championship, finishing 10th in points. 2010 would start the No. 9 team off on a high note by winning the second Gatorade Duel in a photo finish. However, the team was plagued by inconsistency and was knocked out of Chase contention before Richmond. With a lack of results, Kahne departed the team before Martinsville and drove Red Bull Racing's No. 83 Toyota. Kahne was replaced by Aric Almirola for the remaining races, who had a best finish of fourth at Homestead.

==== Marcos Ambrose (2011–2014) ====
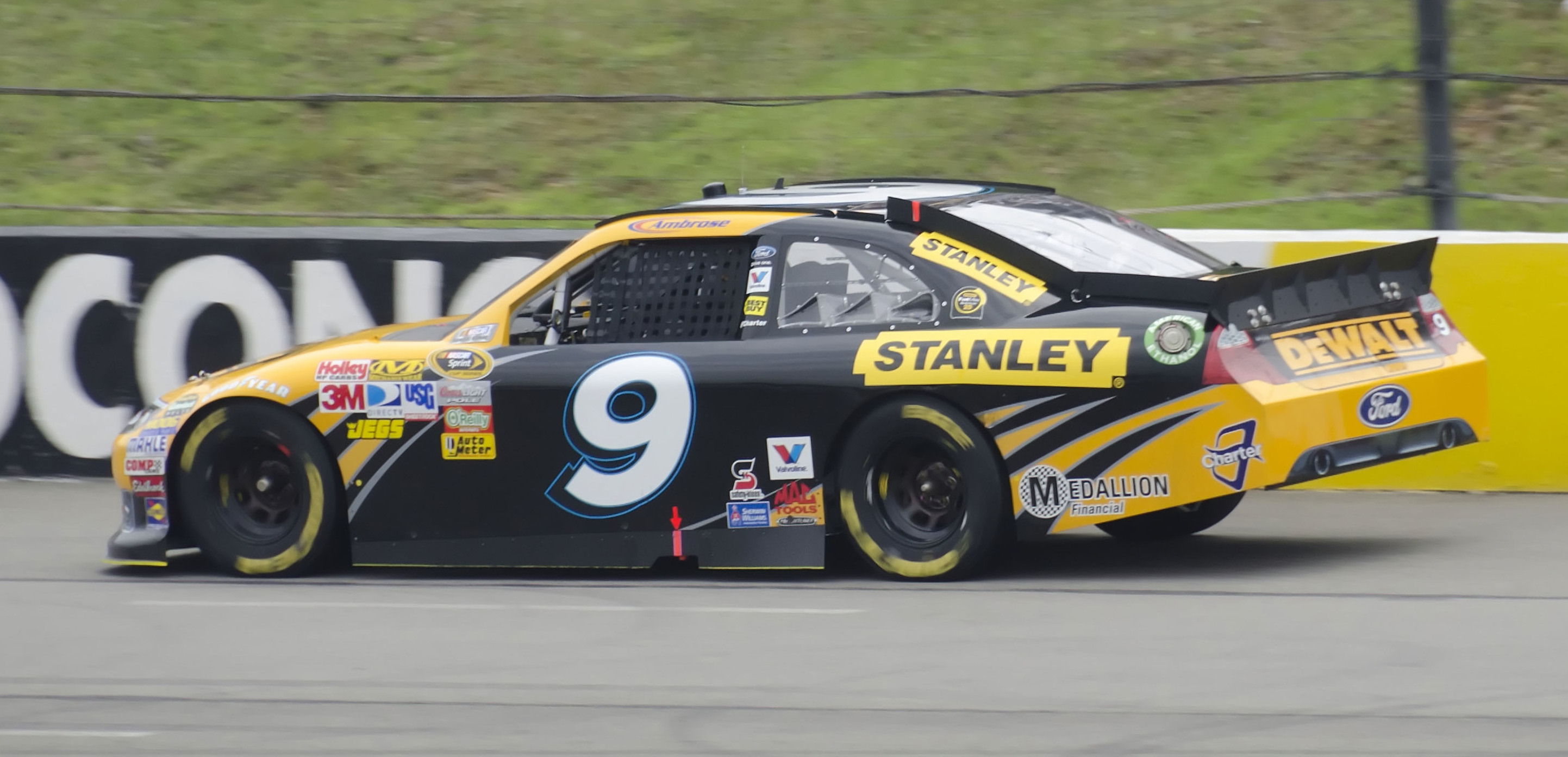
Marcos Ambrose in the No. 9 at Pocono Raceway in 2011

Marcos Ambrose took over driving duties at the beginning of the 2011 season with Stanley Black & Decker moving over from the 19 team. Ambrose had a break out year in the No. 9 Ford and drove to his first NASCAR Sprint Cup Series victory at Watkins Glen International in August. He finished the season with a then-career-high 12 Top 10s, and a 19th-place points finish. Ambrose returned in 2012, and once again won at Watkins Glen, but only had eight Top 10s. However, he did pick up one spot in points to 18th. He failed to win or finish in the Top 5 in 2013, but finished in the Top 10 on six occasions. He dropped to 22nd in points.

==== Sam Hornish Jr. (2015) ====
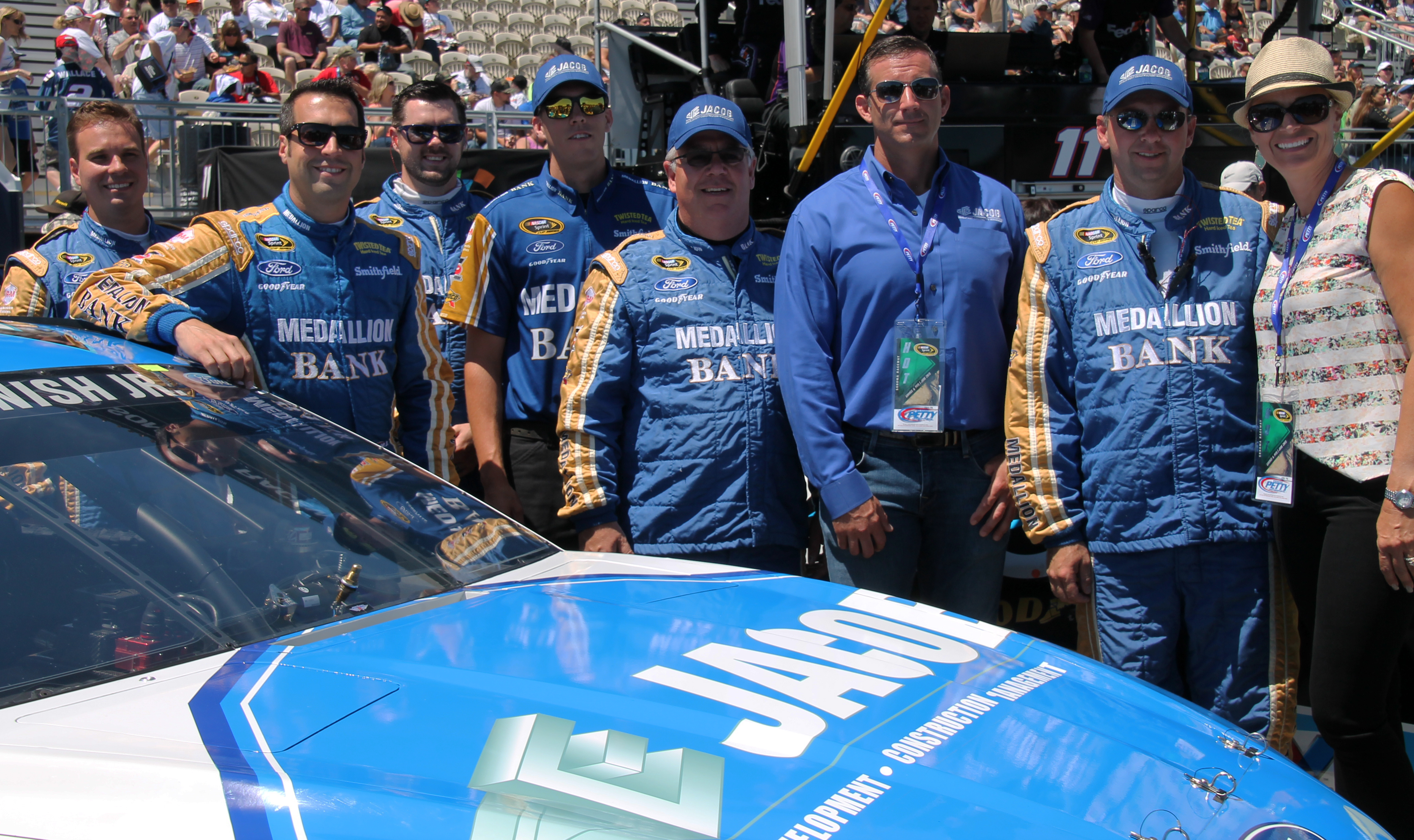
Driver Sam Hornish Jr. (second from left) and the No. 9 team at Sonoma in 2015.

In September 2014, Marcos Ambrose announced he would not return to RPM for 2015, and would depart from NASCAR to return to Australia and the V8 Supercar Series for DJR Team Penske. Later that month, it was announced that primary sponsor Stanley Black & Decker would depart the team for Joe Gibbs Racing. On October 8, 2014, it was announced that Sam Hornish Jr. would drive the No. 9 car starting in 2015. Twisted Tea returned for four races including the Daytona 500. In late-February, it was announced that Medallion Bank, a subsidiary of team owner Andrew Murstein's Medallion Financial Corporation, would appear as a primary sponsor for select races. Medallion partnered with NASCAR Truck Series sponsor Camping World for the third and fourth races of the season (Las Vegas and Phoenix), and other companies including Mercury Marine and Lyon Financial. Hornish struggled during the year, with only three top tens including a best finish of eighth at Talladega in May to finish 26th in points. At the second to last race of the season at Phoenix, Richard Petty announced Hornish would not return to the team following season's end.

==== Brian Scott (2016) ====
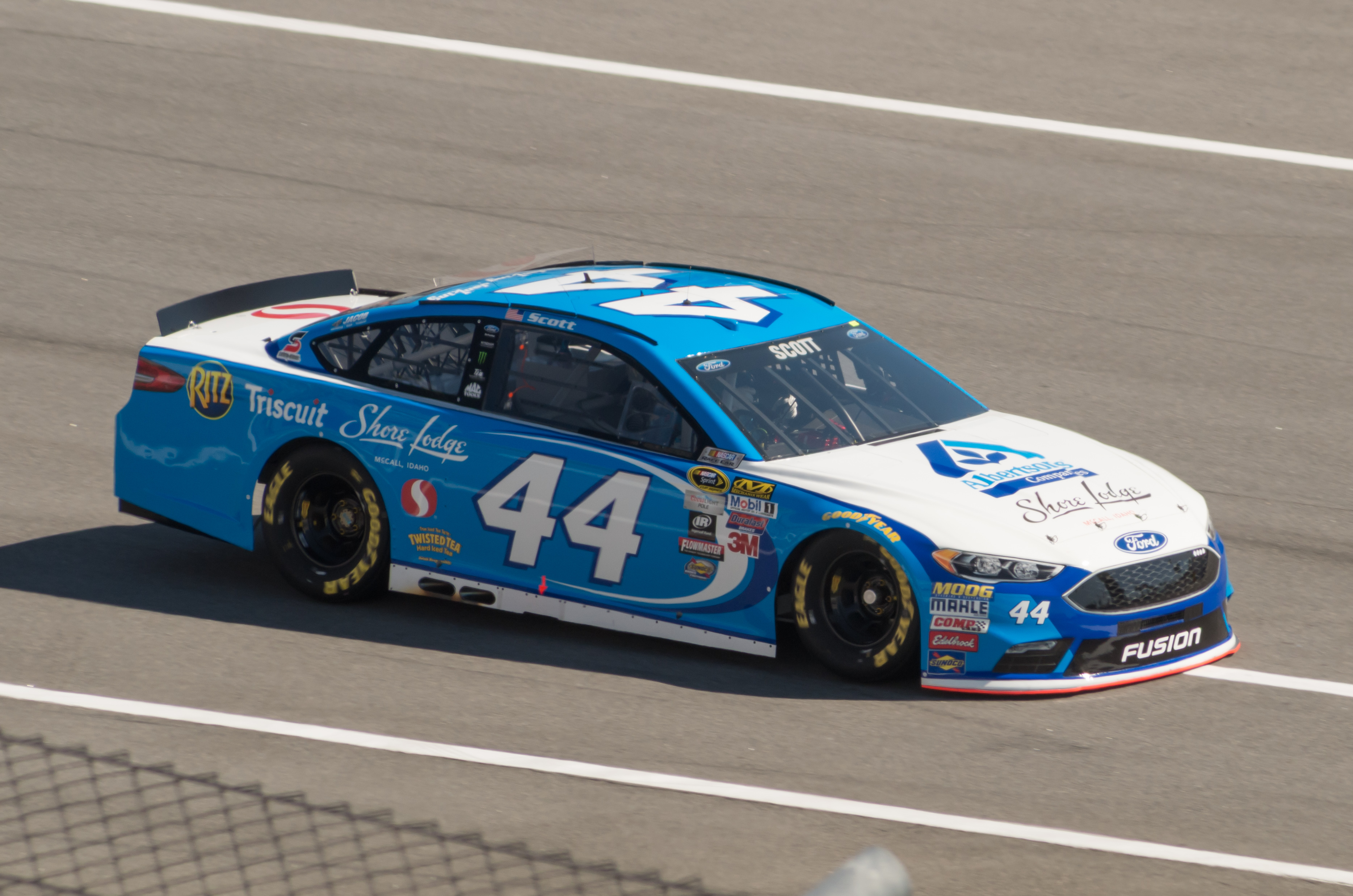
Brian Scott in the No. 44 at Daytona International Speedway in 2016.

Hornish was replaced by longtime Xfinity Series driver Brian Scott for 2016, with Albertsons and Shore Lodge joining Twisted Tea as primary sponsors. The car was renumbered from 9 to 44, which had been used by Petty Enterprises, and by RPM in 2009.

Scott had a career-best 2nd at Talladega in the fall, and a few weeks later, announced he would retire for family reasons. Petty would later sell the No. 44 equipment to Go FAS Racing.

==== Car No. 44 results ====
Year	Driver	No.	Make	1	2	3	4	5	6	7	8	9	10	11	12	13	14	15	16	17	18	19	20	21	22	23	24	25	26	27	28	29	30	31	32	33	34	35	36	Owners	Pts
2009	Kasey Kahne	9	Dodge	DAY; 29	CAL; 12	LVS; 11	ATL; 7	BRI; 5	MAR; 19	TEX; 19	PHO; 13	TAL; 36	RCH; 29	DAR; 23	CLT; 7	DOV; 6	POC; 15	MCH; 21	SON; 1*	NHA; 10	DAY; 15	CHI; 3	IND; 7	POC; 5	GLN; 17	MCH; 11	BRI; 28	ATL; 1	RCH; 12	NHA; 38	DOV; 8	KAN; 6	CAL; 34	CLT; 3	MAR; 32	TAL; 2	TEX; 33	PHO; 15	HOM; 17	10th	6128
2010	Kasey Kahne	9	Ford	DAY; 30	CAL; 34	LVS; 9	ATL; 4*	BRI; 34	MAR; 17	PHO; 39	TEX; 5	TAL; 21	RCH; 21	DAR; 20	DOV; 20	CLT; 12	POC; 27	MCH; 2	SON; 4	NHA; 36*	DAY; 2	CHI; 6	IND; 13	POC; 19	GLN; 17	MCH; 14	BRI; 5	ATL; 32	RCH; 29	NHA; 14	DOV; 28	KAN; 37	CAL; 4	CLT; 38						21st	3948
2010	Aric Almirola	9	Ford																																MAR; 21	TAL; 20	TEX; 21	PHO; 27	HOM; 4	21st	3948
2011	Marcos Ambrose	9	Ford	DAY; 37	PHO; 16	LVS; 4	BRI; 15	CAL; 28	MAR; 29	TEX; 6	TAL; 32	RCH; 23	DAR; 13	DOV; 3	CLT; 6	KAN; 26	POC; 34	MCH; 23	SON; 5	DAY; 17	KEN; 20	NHA; 9	IND; 34	POC; 20	GLN; 1	MCH; 27	BRI; 10	ATL; 21	RCH; 21	CHI; 19	NHA; 30	DOV; 9	KAN; 9	CLT; 5	TAL; 19	MAR; 29	TEX; 11	PHO; 8	HOM; 39	19th	936
2012	Marcos Ambrose	9	Ford	DAY; 13	PHO; 32	LVS; 13	BRI; 36	CAL; 21	MAR; 15	TEX; 20	KAN; 16	RCH; 22	TAL; 14	DAR; 9	CLT; 32	DOV; 10	POC; 13	MCH; 9	SON; 8	KEN; 13	DAY; 30	NHA; 19	IND; 20	POC; 10	GLN; 1	MCH; 5	BRI; 5	ATL; 17	RCH; 15	CHI; 27	NHA; 24	DOV; 18	TAL; 27	CLT; 33	KAN; 12	MAR; 24	TEX; 32	PHO; 18	HOM; 13	18th	950
2013	Marcos Ambrose	9	Ford	DAY; 18	PHO; 19	LVS; 22	BRI; 19	CAL; 36	MAR; 8	TEX; 19	KAN; 20	RCH; 42	TAL; 14	DAR; 34	CLT; 10	DOV; 19	POC; 17	MCH; 23	SON; 7	KEN; 13	DAY; 26	NHA; 33	IND; 16	POC; 12	GLN; 31*	MCH; 6	BRI; 8	ATL; 13	RCH; 27	CHI; 15	NHA; 18	DOV; 16	KAN; 9	CLT; 17	TAL; 39	MAR; 19	TEX; 21	PHO; 26	HOM; 26	22nd	872
2014	Marcos Ambrose	9	Ford	DAY; 18	PHO; 21	LVS; 24	BRI; 5	CAL; 30	MAR; 5	TEX; 20	DAR; 14	RCH; 18	TAL; 19	KAN; 24	CLT; 29	DOV; 16	POC; 24	MCH; 25	SON; 8	KEN; 13	DAY; 10	NHA; 27	IND; 22	POC; 14	GLN; 2	MCH; 12	BRI; 34	ATL; 42	RCH; 27	CHI; 25	NHA; 24	DOV; 26	KAN; 20	CLT; 25	TAL; 8	MAR; 23	TEX; 27	PHO; 10	HOM; 27	23rd	870
2015	Sam Hornish Jr.	9	Ford	DAY; 12	ATL; 21	LVS; 24	PHO; 40	CAL; 43	MAR; 32	TEX; 26	BRI; 19	RCH; 35	TAL; 6	KAN; 16	CLT; 24	DOV; 22	POC; 41	MCH; 26	SON; 10	DAY; 30	KEN; 22	NHA; 29	IND; 16	POC; 39	GLN; 9	MCH; 19	BRI; 18	DAR; 28	RCH; 28	CHI; 30	NHA; 20	DOV; 20	CLT; 17	KAN; 28	TAL; 17	MAR; 28	TEX; 24	PHO; 31	HOM; 25	26th	709
2016	Brian Scott	44	Ford	DAY; 24	ATL; 31	LVS; 27	PHO; 27	CAL; 12	MAR; 26	TEX; 27	BRI; 30	RCH; 35	TAL; 30	KAN; 22	DOV; 24	CLT; 29	POC; 39	MCH; 36	SON; 33	DAY; 37	KEN; 33	NHA; 38	IND; 27	POC; 24	GLN; 25	BRI; 18	MCH; 28	DAR; 39	RCH; 35	CHI; 31	NHA; 31	DOV; 21	CLT; 22	KAN; 28	TAL; 2	MAR; 34	TEX; 27	PHO; 30	HOM; 15	33rd	481

=== Car No. 98 history ===
==== 2009: No. 44 Richard Petty Motorsports Dodge ====
A. J. Allmendinger (2009)

The merger between GEM and Petty Enterprises in January 2009 suddenly expanded the team to four rides; the team was renamed to Richard Petty Motorsports and Sadler remained in the 19, while Sorenson moved over to the newly absorbed No. 43 car. Later that month, Allmendinger was signed to drive the newly renumbered No. 44 (used by Kyle Petty, Buckshot Jones, and others at Petty Enterprises in the past) in 2009 with an option for a second season. The only starts guaranteed for the team were the Budweiser Shootout and the first eight-point races of 2009, with the possibility of more races if the team could secure sponsorship. The team unveiled a retro Valvoline/Petty Blue paint scheme for the Daytona 500, and opened the year with a third-place finish in the "Great American Race". Later in the season, Allmendinger finished ninth at Martinsville. They secured sponsorship through the Chevy Rock and Roll 400 at Richmond in the fall. RPM announced in April that Allmendinger was being signed to a two-year deal, which would keep him in the No. 44 through the end of the 2010 season and sponsorships from Hunt Brothers Pizza, Super 8, Harrah's Entertainment, and Ford allowed him to complete the season. The 44 would also run Fords in several late season races in preparation for a manufacturer switch the next year. Considering the circumstances the year began on, Allmendinger had a solid season, with one Top 5, six Top 10s, and a 24th-place points finish. He would move over to the 43 the next year.

==== 2010: No. 98 Menards Ford ====
Paul Menard (2010)

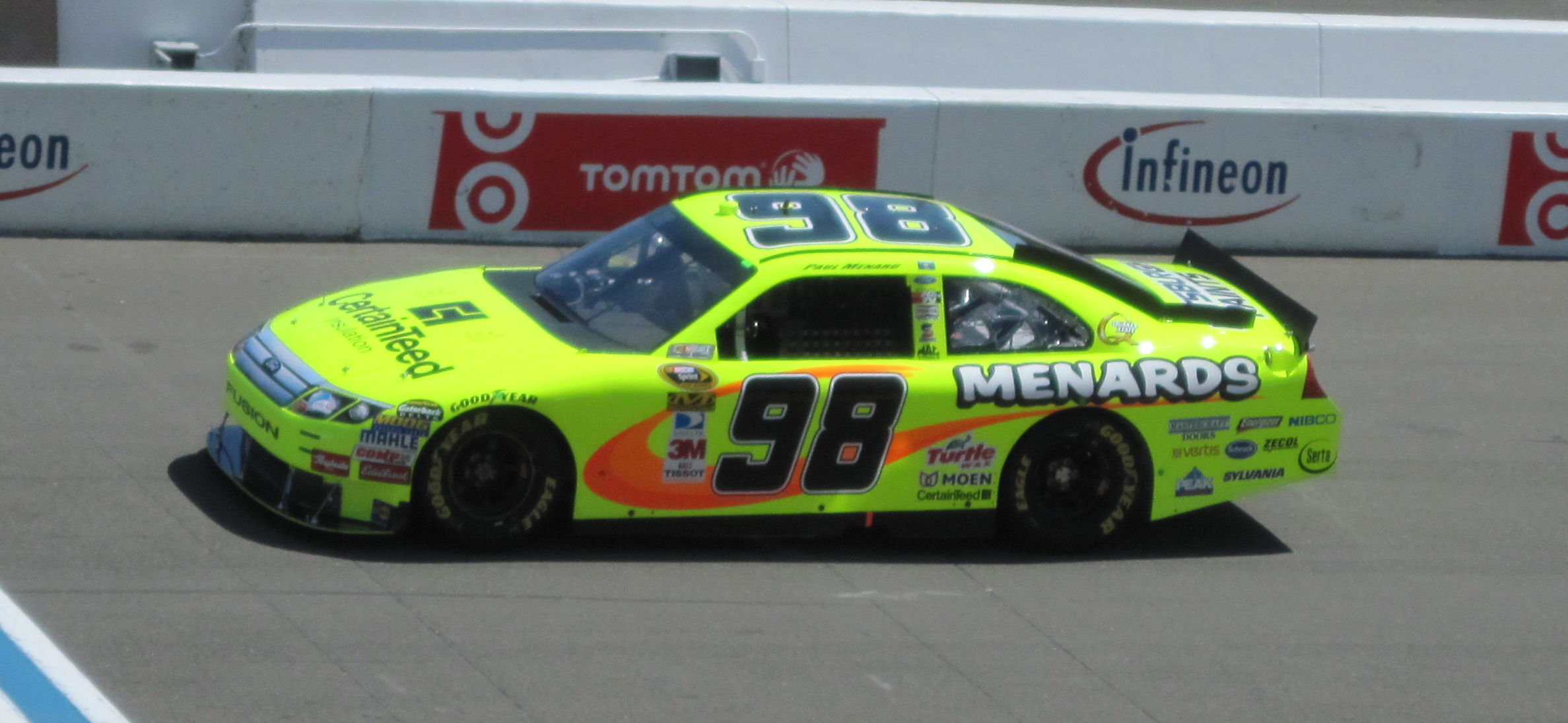
Paul Menard in the No. 98 during the 2010 Toyota/Save Mart 350

For 2010, due to the buyout of Yates Racing by RPM, Paul Menard replaced Reed Sorenson (driver of the 43 in 2009) and drove the No. 98 Menards Ford Fusion. Menard posted similar stats to Allmendinger the prior year (1 top 5, 6 top 10s, 23rd in points), but left the team along with crew chief Slugger Labbe for 2011, taking the Menards sponsorship with him to Richard Childress Racing, forcing the No. 98 to shut down.

==== Car No. 98 results ====
Year	Driver	No.	Make	1	2	3	4	5	6	7	8	9	10	11	12	13	14	15	16	17	18	19	20	21	22	23	24	25	26	27	28	29	30	31	32	33	34	35	36	Owners	Pts
2009	A. J. Allmendinger	44	Dodge	DAY; 3	CAL; 29	LVS; 33	ATL; 17	BRI; 16	MAR; 9	TEX; 34	PHO; 35	TAL; 35	RCH; 21	DAR; 17	CLT; 32	DOV; 29	POC; 30	MCH; 39	SON; 7	NHA; 32	DAY; 17	CHI; 13	IND; 20	POC; 17	GLN; 13	MCH; 22	BRI; 37	ATL; 20	RCH; 23	NHA; 25	DOV; 7	KAN; 17	CAL; 33	CLT; 23	MAR; 34	TAL; 33				24th	3476
2009	A. J. Allmendinger	44	Ford																																		TEX; 10	PHO; 13	HOM; 10	24th	3476
2010	Paul Menard	98	Ford	DAY; 13	CAL; 18	LVS; 17	ATL; 5	BRI; 18	MAR; 14	PHO; 29	TEX; 35	TAL; 25	RCH; 27	DAR; 30	DOV; 21	CLT; 8	POC; 16	MCH; 25	SON; 22	NHA; 28	DAY; 18	CHI; 10	IND; 14	POC; 13	GLN; 16	MCH; 35	BRI; 21	ATL; 35	RCH; 26	NHA; 28	DOV; 7	KAN; 8	CAL; 22	CLT; 24	MAR; 13	TAL; 13	TEX; 10	PHO; 29	HOM; 19	23rd	3776

== Xfinity Series ==
=== Car No. 09 history ===
Braun Racing alliance (2009)

In 2009, the No. 9 team partnered with Braun Racing and their No. 10 Toyota Camry for several races with Kasey Kahne and Elliott Sadler. Fritos with the sponsor at Atlanta with Kahne as driver. Bumper to Bumper sponsored Sadler at New Hampshire. McDonald's was the sponsor at Daytona in July and at Bristol in August.

Richard Petty Motorsports (2011–2014)

The team was brought back in 2011, RPM provided a car for Marcos Ambrose in the NASCAR Nationwide Series race in Montreal. The No. 9 Ford Mustang was prepared by Roush Fenway Racing. Owen Kelly practiced and qualified the car while Ambrose was in Michigan for the Sprint Cup race. The car qualified 9th. Even with the team starting in the back with the driver change, the team won the race that stopped a string of bad luck for Ambrose at the track.

In 2013, the No. 9 Ford Mustang was driven by Marcos Ambrose in the Nationwide Children's Hospital 200 at Mid-Ohio to a seventh-place finish. The 9 was also run at Homestead for the season finale with Corey Lajoie behind the wheel. He was involved in a crash and finished 33rd.

In 2014, Ambrose returned to the series in the No. 09 Ford Mustang at Watkins Glen International, winning the race.

=== Car No. 09 results ===
NASCAR Nationwide Series results
Year	Driver	No.	Make	1	2	3	4	5	6	7	8	9	10	11	12	13	14	15	16	17	18	19	20	21	22	23	24	25	26	27	28	29	30	31	32	33	34	Owners	Pts
2011	Marcos Ambrose	9	Ford	DAY	PHO	LVS	BRI	CAL	TEX	TAL	NSH	RCH	DAR	DOV	IOW	CLT	CHI	MCH	ROA	DAY	KEN	NHA	NSH	IRP	IOW	GLN	CGV; 1	BRI	ATL	RCH	CHI	DOV	KAN	CLT	TEX	PHO	HOM	58th	47
2013	Marcos Ambrose	9	Ford	DAY	PHO	LVS	BRI	CAL	TEX	RCH	TAL	DAR	CLT	DOV	IOW	MCH	ROA	KEN	DAY	NHA	CHI	IND	IOW	GLN	MOH; 7	BRI	ATL	RCH	CHI	KEN	DOV	KAN	CLT	TEX	PHO			52nd	47
2013	Corey LaJoie	9	Ford																																	HOM; 34		52nd	47
2014	Marcos Ambrose	09	Ford	DAY	PHO	LVS	BRI	CAL	TEX	DAR	RCH	TAL	IOW	CLT	DOV	MCH	ROA	KEN	DAY	NHA	CHI	IND	IOW	GLN; 1	MOH	BRI	ATL	RCH	CHI	KEN	DOV	KAN	CLT	TEX	PHO	HOM		51st	48

=== Car No. 43 history ===
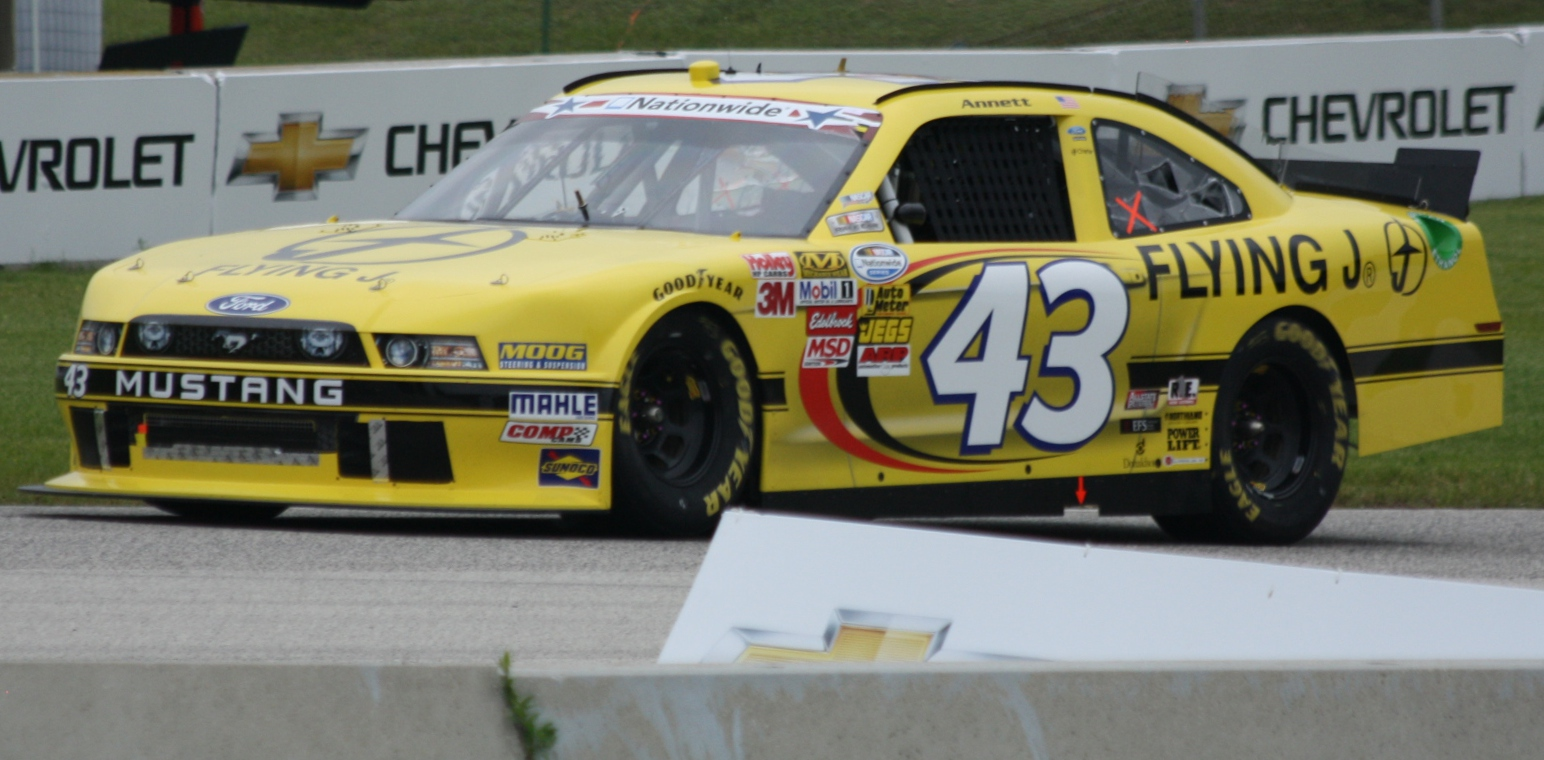
The No. 43 driven by Michael Annett at Road America in 2013

Michael Annett (2012–2013)

In 2012, the No. 9 was renumbered to the No. 43 running Michael Annett, who brings his sponsorship from Pilot Flying J, though STP served as sponsor for the STP 300 at Chicagoland.

Dakoda Armstrong (2014–2015)

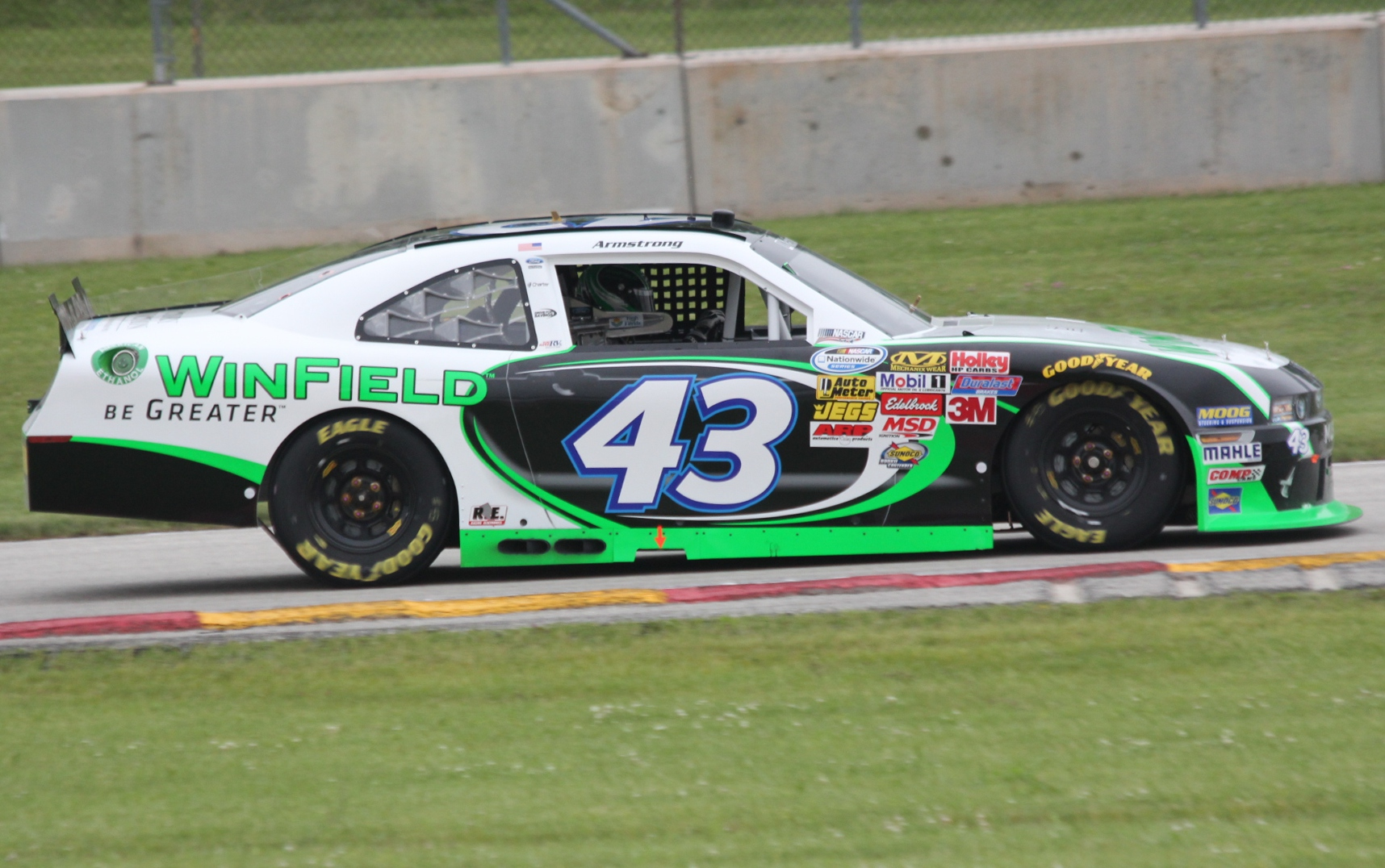
Dakoda Armstrong at Road America in 2014.

With Annett moving up to the Cup Series for Tommy Baldwin Racing, RPM hired former Turn One Racing Truck driver Dakoda Armstrong to take over the No. 43, bringing sponsorship from WinField. Armstrong drove for two seasons, then left after 2015 for JGL Racing.

Jeb Burton (2016)

In 2016, former BK Racing driver Jeb Burton joined the team, driving the No. 43. Despite being 11th in points after Charlotte in June, the team was suspended after sponsor J. Streicher & Co. defaulted on their agreement with RPM.

=== Car No. 43 results ===
NASCAR Xfinity Series results
Year	Driver	No.	Make	1	2	3	4	5	6	7	8	9	10	11	12	13	14	15	16	17	18	19	20	21	22	23	24	25	26	27	28	29	30	31	32	33	Owners	Pts
2012	Michael Annett	43	Ford	DAY; 27	PHO; 10	LVS; 13	BRI; 11	CAL; 11	TEX; 9	RCH; 8	TAL; 23	DAR; 14	IOW; 14	CLT; 14	DOV; 11	MCH; 12	ROA; 26	KEN; 4	DAY; 3	NHA; 11	CHI; 5	IND; 6	IOW; 4	GLN; 11	CGV; 28	BRI; 8	ATL; 10	RCH; 5	CHI; 7	KEN; 7	DOV; 3	CLT; 10	KAN; 8	TEX; 17	PHO; 7	HOM; 12	5th	1082
2013	Michael Annett	43	Ford	DAY; 26									CLT; 17	DOV; 13	IOW; 30	MCH; 19	ROA; 35	KEN; 18	DAY; 15	NHA; 5	CHI; 16	IND; 9	IOW; 12	GLN; 22	MOH; 22	BRI; 11	ATL; 14	RCH; 13	CHI; 18	KEN; 10	DOV; 14	KAN; 12	CLT; 10	TEX; 14	PHO; 14	HOM; 17	15th	924
2013	Aric Almirola	43	Ford		PHO; 9																																15th	924
2013	Reed Sorenson	43	Ford			LVS; 16	BRI; 18	CAL; 17	TEX; 15	RCH; 10	TAL; 22	DAR; 18																									15th	924
2014	Dakoda Armstrong	43	Ford	DAY; 23	PHO; 18	LVS; 23	BRI; 24	CAL; 20	TEX; 22	DAR; 18	RCH; 17	TAL; 18	IOW; 21	CLT; 19	DOV; 16	MCH; 19	ROA; 25	KEN; 20	DAY; 19	NHA; 30	CHI; 20	IND; 17	IOW; 21	GLN; 25	MOH; 10	BRI; 28	ATL; 33	RCH; 7	CHI; 22	KEN; 19	DOV; 17	KAN; 25	CLT; 19	TEX; 10	PHO; 21	HOM; 20	19th	788
2015	Dakoda Armstrong	43	Ford	DAY; 11	ATL; 20	LVS; 30	PHO; 18	CAL; 36	TEX; 16	BRI; 23	RCH; 27	TAL; 22	IOW; 21	CLT; 16	DOV; 14	MCH; 16	CHI; 28	DAY; 6	KEN; 17	NHA; 16	IND; 19	IOW; 16	GLN; 23	MOH; 23	BRI; 24	ROA; 34	DAR; 18	RCH; 21	CHI; 15	KEN; 14	DOV; 20	CLT; 16	KAN; 20	TEX; 18	PHO; 18	HOM; 15	19th	803
2016	Jeb Burton	43	Ford	DAY; 25	ATL; 10	LVS; 17	PHO; 17	CAL; 16	TEX; 35	BRI; 12	RCH; 19	TAL; 17	DOV; 13	CLT; 11	POC	MCH	IOW	DAY	KEN	NHA	IND	IOW	GLN	MOH	BRI	ROA	DAR	RCH	CHI	KEN	DOV	CLT	KAN	TEX	PHO	HOM	37th	260

== ARCA ==
=== Empire Racing (2016) ===
In 2016, Richard Petty Motorsports formed an alliance with Empire Racing, owned by John Corr. Empire Racing would field the No. 43 Petty's Garage entry in the Camping World Truck Series part-time in the series, with a number of young drivers sharing the truck. Austin Hill drove at Daytona. Korbin Forrister drove at Eldora, but failed to qualify.

=== Thad Moffitt (2017–2019) ===
The alliance with Empire Racing has moved to ARCA from the 2017 season having been centered around Richard Petty's grandson, Thad Moffitt. Moffitt has run part-time in the No. 46, and Sean Corr drove the No. 43 in a few races.
