= Douglas G. Bergeron =

American businessman (born 1960)

Doug Bergeron
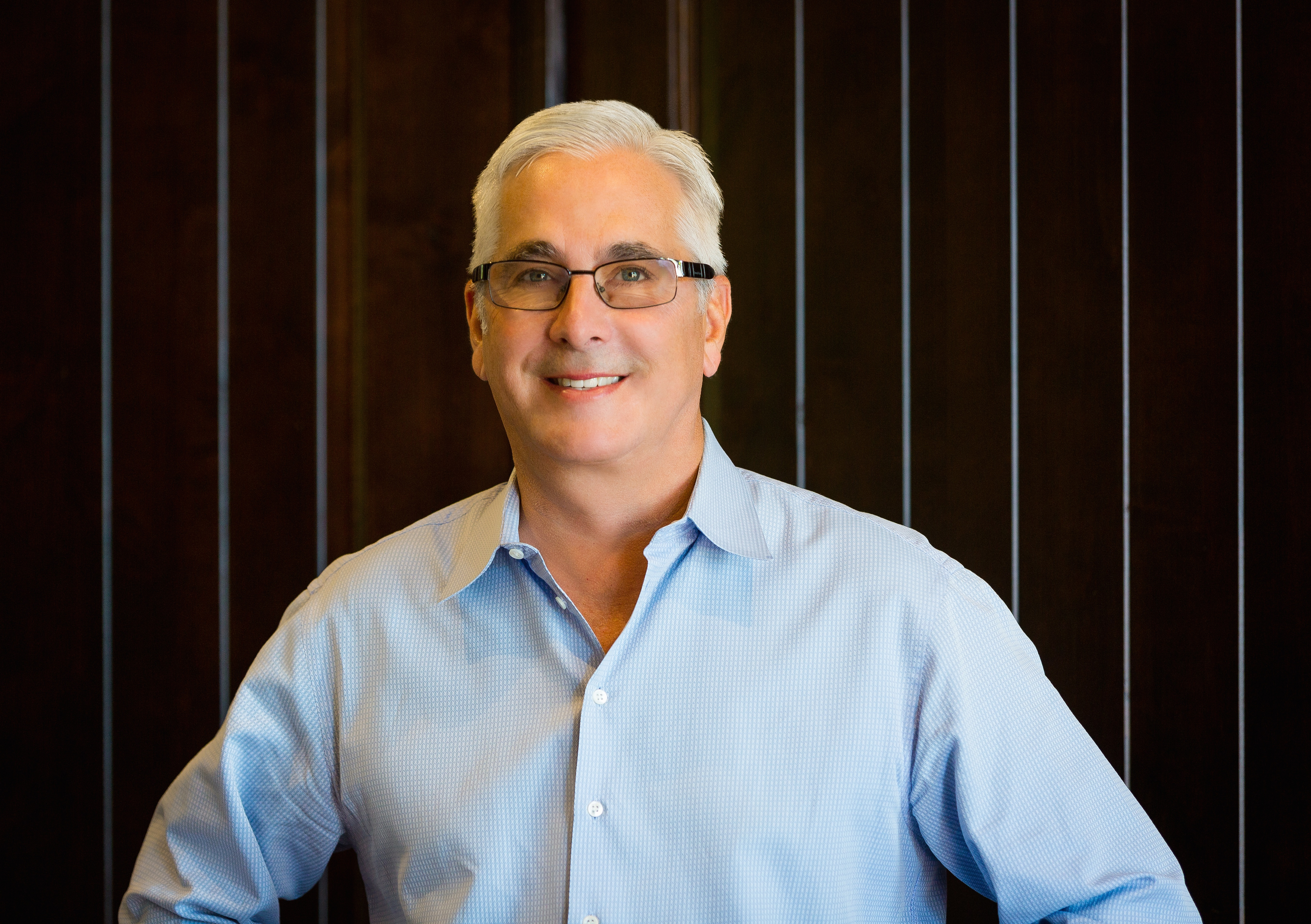
- Born: Douglas George Bergeron; December 5, 1960 (age 65); Windsor, Ontario, Canada
- Education: York University; University of Southern California

Doug Bergeron is the founder and sole shareholder of DGB Investments, a diversified holding company of public and private investments.

In 2001, Bergeron led the acquisition of VeriFone from Hewlett-Packard for $50 million and became its chairman and chief executive officer. In 2002, Bergeron partnered with GTCR and pursued a strategy of expanding VeriFone into a multinational company. During Bergeron’s tenure, VeriFone’s annual revenues grew from $297 million to more than $2 billion, and its enterprise value reached approximately $5 billion.

Bergeron served as Chairman of the Board of Cantaloupe, Inc. (Nasdaq: CTLP) until its acquisition by 365 Retail Markets, a Providence Equity Partners portfolio company, in May 2026. He was appointed chairman following a proxy contest initiated by Hudson Executive Capital, where he served as co-managing partner. During his tenure, Cantaloupe’s value increased threefold.

Bergeron also serves as a member of the Board of Directors of Zact and 365 Retail Markets. He serves on the Board of Governors of York University in Toronto and chairs its Land and Property Committee.

Bergeron holds an Honours Bachelor of Arts with Special Honours in Computer Science from York University in Toronto, a Master of Science from the University of Southern California, and an Honorary Doctorate of Laws from York University.

Bergeron is a member of the Board of Overseers of the Hoover Institution at Stanford University, a permanent member of the Council on Foreign Relations, a five-time invited delegate to the World Economic Forum in Davos, Switzerland, and has been a frequent guest on CNBC and Fox Business.

== Education ==
Bergeron attended York University, in Toronto, Canada, graduating in 1983 with a Bachelor of Arts with Special Honors in Computer Science.

Upon graduation, Bergeron was employed by Northern Telecom (later called Nortel Networks) in Ottawa, Ontario. In 1985, he was awarded the Northern Telecom Post Graduate Scholarship and enrolled at the University of Southern California in Los Angeles, graduating in 1987 with a Master of Science degree.

Bergeron was awarded an Honorary Doctorate of Laws (LLD) by York University’s Lassonde School of Engineering in June, 2013. The award marked the 30th anniversary of Bergeron’s graduation from York. At this occasion, Bergeron delivered the commencement address to the York University, Lassonde School of Engineering graduating class of 2013.

== VeriFone ==
In 2001, in partnership with Gores Technology Group (now, The Gores Group), Bergeron led the acquisition of VeriFone from Hewlett-Packard in a transaction valued at $50 million. Hewlett-Packard had acquired the business in 1998 for $1.3 billion. Upon completion of the VeriFone acquisition, Bergeron was named Chairman and CEO.

In 2002, Gores sold VeriFone to Bergeron and GTCR, a Chicago-based private equity firm in a transaction valued at $160 million. Bergeron and GTCR embarked upon a strategy to aggressively grow VeriFone into a multinational company. Bergeron resigned as CEO of VeriFone in March, 2013, following 12 years at the helm. VeriFone’s enterprise value as of May, 2012 was approximately $5 billion. The Bergeron/GTCR acquisition of VeriFone is widely considered to be one of the most successful private equity investments of the decade.

In 2007, Bergeron was an award recipient and national finalist for the EY Entrepreneur of the Year Award.

== SunGard ==
From 1990 through 1999, Bergeron served in a number of executive management positions at SunGard Data Systems, including Managing Director of SunGard Capital Markets N.A., President of SunGard Futures Systems, and Group CEO of SunGard Brokerage Systems Group.

== Richard Petty Motorsports ==
For several years Bergeron was a partial owner of Richard Petty Motorsports. In November 2010 an investment group made up of Bergeron, Andrew Murstein, and Richard Petty bought its racing assets. Bergeron's share was bought out at the end of 2014.

== Ethan Allen ==
In August 2026, Bergeron disclosed a 5% ownership stake in furniture manufacturer Ethan Allen through DGB Investments and family trusts. He nominated himself and five other candidates for election to the company's board at its 2026 annual meeting, seeking to replace the entire board. Bergeron also called for chairman and chief executive officer Farooq Kathwari to be replaced, arguing that changes in leadership, governance and digital strategy were necessary to restore the company's growth.

== Philanthropy ==
Bergeron is an active philanthropist.

In 2014, York University in Toronto, one of Canada’s largest universities, announced that Bergeron had made a $10 million gift, the largest gift ever to York by an alumni, to build the Bergeron Centre for Engineering Excellence.

In 2022, The University of Utah Hospital announced that Bergeron had made a $1 million gift to the University of Utah Pediatric Clinic for purchases of new technology.

In 2006, Bergeron announced a $1 million gift towards the Bergeron Women in Technology Scholarship Program at Georgia State University in Atlanta, Georgia. Each year, five undergraduate female students are selected for their high academic and leadership potential. Each woman is awarded a full year of tuition and is paired with a C-level female technology leader for mentorship.

In 2015, Bergeron announced the Bergeron Scholarship Program had been expanded to Cristo Rey High School, an inner-city school in San Jose, California, through a $500,000 gift.

In 2012, Georgetown University announced that Bergeron had made a $1.25 million gift in order to endow the George Bergeron Professorship of Neuroscience at Georgetown University Medical.

In 2012, York University announced a $2 million gift to fund the Bergeron Entrepreneurs in Science and Technology (BEST) Program. This new inter-disciplinary program unites courses around business plan formation and venture capital finance into the science and engineering programs.

In 2011, Bergeron committed $2 million to Multiple Sclerosis Canada, in a gift dedicated to advanced research and towards community service for MS patients in the Windsor/Essex Canada chapter. Bergeron’s father, George Bergeron (1936-1999) suffered from MS and is the former chairman of the Windsor/Essex Canada chapter. In 2005, the City of Windsor opened the George Bergeron Healing Garden on the riverfront of the Detroit river, featuring a bronze statue of George Bergeron in honor of his contribution to the City.

In 2011, Sacred Heart Schools in Atherton, California announced that Bergeron had made a $2 million gift in order to open the new Bergeron Lower School at the SHS campus.

In 2011, the Bergeron Women in Technology Program was expanded to the University of California at Berkeley as a result of a further $1 million gift to the university. Each year, five female undergraduate students are selected and each woman is awarded a two-year scholarship and is matched with a C-level female technology leader in Silicon Valley.

== Personal life ==
Bergeron was born in Windsor, Ontario, Canada, in 1960, and is the oldest of George and Eleanor Bergeron's four children.

Bergeron is a permanent member of the Council on Foreign Relations, a five-time invited delegate to the World Economic Forum in Davos, Switzerland, and has been a frequent guest on CNBC and Fox Business.
