= 2009 Carfax 400 =

Race details
- Race 23 of 36 in the 2009 NASCAR Sprint Cup Series
- 2009 Carfax 400 program cover
- Date: August 16, 2009
- Location: Michigan International Speedway, Brooklyn, Michigan
- Course: Permanent racing facility
- Course length: 2.0 miles (3.218 km)
- Distance: 200 laps, 400 mi (643.737 km)
- Weather: Temperatures reaching up to 89.6 °F (32.0 °C); wind speeds up to 11.1 miles per hour (17.9 km/h)
- Average speed: 131.531 miles per hour (211.679 km/h)

Pole position
Driver	Brian Vickers	Red Bull Racing Team
- Time: 38.453

Most laps led
Driver	Jimmie Johnson	Hendrick Motorsports
- Laps: 133

Winner
No. 83	Brian Vickers	Red Bull Racing Team

Television in the United States
- Network: ESPN
- Announcers: Jerry Punch, Andy Petree and Dale Jarrett

The 2009 Carfax 400 is a NASCAR Sprint Cup Series race that took place on August 16, 2009, at Michigan International Speedway in Brooklyn, Michigan. Actual start time of the race was 2:10PM Eastern Daylight Time; meaning that the race ended at exactly 5:12 PM EDT.

== Background ==
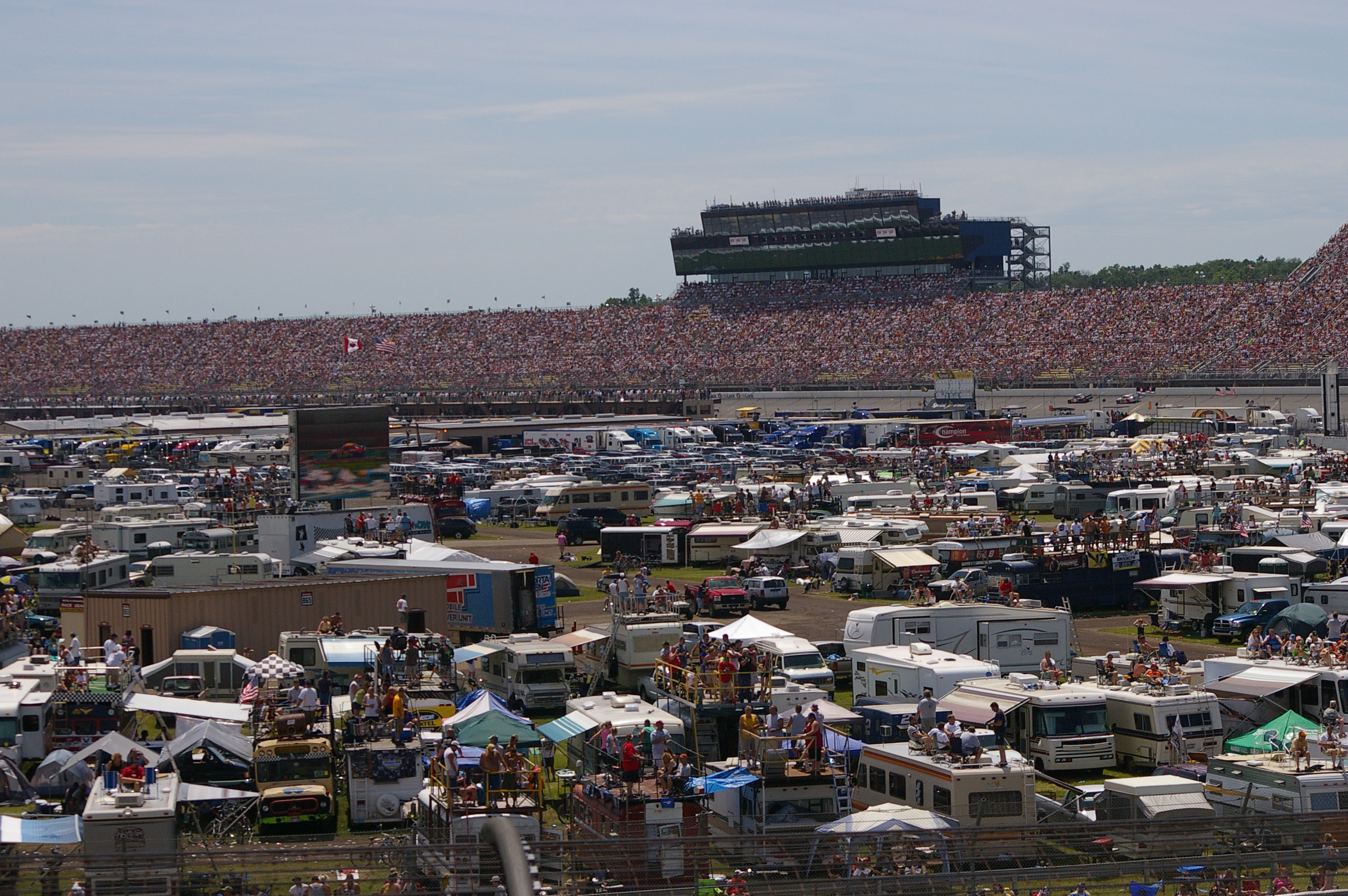
Michigan International Speedway's front stretch and infield.

Michigan International Speedway is a four-turn superspeedway that is 2 miles (3.2 km) long. Opened in 1968, the track's turns are banked at eighteen degrees, while the 3,600-foot-long front stretch, the location of the finish line, is banked at twelve degrees. The back stretch, has a five degree banking and is 2,242 feet long.

== Summary ==
200 laps were run on a paved oval track spanning 2.000 miles (3.219 km). Out of the 43 race car drivers on the grid, there were 41 American-born drivers and two foreigners (Marcos Ambrose from Australia and Juan Pablo Montoya from Colombia). There were seven cautions for 36 laps and the race lasted three hours and two minutes. Attendance was 103,000 strong and Brian Vickers (driving a Toyota Camry) won the race under a fuel mileage finish. The other contenders who finished in the top ten were: Jeff Gordon (lost by 1.409 seconds), Dale Earnhardt Jr., Carl Edwards, Sam Hornish Jr., Casey Mears, Joey Logano, Clint Bowyer, David Reutimann, and Denny Hamlin. The pole speed was 187.242 miles per hour (301.337 km/h) while the average speed was 131.531 miles per hour (211.679 km/h). Jimmie Johnson had a dominant run during the closing laps until he ran out of fuel. He later admitted that his team was not good on fuel mileage during the race.

Tony Raines failed to qualify for the race due to lack of speed. There were two instances of rain during the race which eventually returned to fair weather.

== Results ==
POS	ST	#	DRIVER	SPONSOR / OWNER	CAR	LAPS	MONEY	STATUS	LED	PTS
1	1	83	Brian Vickers	Red Bull (Dietrich Mateschitz)	Toyota	200	180873	running	12	190
2	21	24	Jeff Gordon	DuPont (Rick Hendrick)	Chevrolet	200	181151	running	1	175
3	15	88	Dale Earnhardt Jr.	National Guard / AMP Energy (Rick Hendrick)	Chevrolet	200	131500	running	6	170
4	32	99	Carl Edwards	Aflac (Jack Roush)	Ford	200	156806	running	1	165
5	14	77	Sam Hornish Jr.	Mobil 1 (Roger Penske)	Dodge	200	118210	running	0	155
6	42	07	Casey Mears	Jack Daniel's (Richard Childress)	Chevrolet	200	107250	running	0	150
7	8	20	Joey Logano	Home Depot (Joe Gibbs)	Toyota	200	144726	running	0	146
8	23	33	Clint Bowyer	Cheerios / Hamburger Helper (Richard Childress)	Chevrolet	200	96625	running	1	147
9	31	00	David Reutimann	Aaron's Dream Machine (Michael Waltrip)	Toyota	200	119248	running	4	143
10	16	11	Denny Hamlin	FedEx Office (Joe Gibbs)	Toyota	200	100775	running	2	139
11	10	9	Kasey Kahne	Budweiser (Richard Petty Motorsports)	Dodge	200	122773	running	0	130
12	22	29	Kevin Harvick	Shell / Pennzoil (Richard Childress)	Chevrolet	200	121353	running	0	127
13	20	12	David Stremme	Penske Racing (Roger Penske)	Dodge	200	116440	running	0	124
14	25	17	Matt Kenseth	DeWalt (Jack Roush)	Ford	200	131340	running	6	126
15	7	39	Ryan Newman	Haas Automation (Stewart Haas Racing)	Chevrolet	200	111029	running	0	118
16	9	21	Bill Elliott	Motorcraft / Quick Lane Tire & Auto Center (Wood Brothers)	Ford	200	78025	running	0	115
17	18	14	Tony Stewart	Office Depot / Old Spice (Stewart Haas Racing)	Chevrolet	200	97698	running	2	117
18	27	31	Jeff Burton	Caterpillar (Richard Childress)	Chevrolet	200	123831	running	0	109
19	3	42	Juan Pablo Montoya	Target (Earnhardt Ganassi Racing)	Chevrolet	200	115173	running	0	106
20	17	16	Greg Biffle	3M Scotch Tough Duct Tape (Jack Roush)	Ford	200	98100	running	0	103
21	5	1	Martin Truex Jr.	Bass Pro Shops / Tracker Boats (Earnhardt Ganassi Racing)	Chevrolet	200	114690	running	0	100
22	13	44	A.J. Allmendinger	Super 8 Motels (Richard Petty Motorsports)	Dodge	200	79400	running	0	97
23	39	18	Kyle Busch	Interstate Batteries (Joe Gibbs)	Toyota	200	124448	running	0	94
24	12	25	Brad Keselowski	GoDaddy.com (Rick Hendrick)	Chevrolet	200	75475	running	0	91
25	34	19	Elliott Sadler	Stanley Tools (Richard Petty Motorsports)	Dodge	200	87100	running	0	88
26	35	98	Paul Menard	Moen / Menards (Yates Racing)	Ford	200	108606	running	4	90
27	30	55	Michael Waltrip	NAPA Auto Parts (Michael Waltrip)	Toyota	200	85875	running	1	87
28	29	34	John Andretti	Carfax (Bob Jenkins)	Chevrolet	200	85625	running	0	79
29	40	43	Reed Sorenson	Auto Value Bumper to Bumper (Richard Petty Motorsports)	Dodge	200	114701	running	0	76
30	37	6	David Ragan	UPS (Jack Roush)	Ford	200	85775	running	1	78
31	2	5	Mark Martin	Kellogg's / Carquest (Rick Hendrick)	Chevrolet	200	90550	running	26	75
32	19	26	Jamie McMurray	Crown Royal (Jack Roush)	Ford	200	82050	running	0	67
33	4	48	Jimmie Johnson	Lowe's (Rick Hendrick)	Chevrolet	199	129201	running	133	74
34	11	82	Scott Speed	Red Bull (Dietrich Mateschitz)	Toyota	199	88448	running	0	61
35	26	47	Marcos Ambrose	Little Debbie / Kingsford / Clorox (JTG-Daugherty Racing)	Toyota	199	86798	running	0	58
36	6	2	Kurt Busch	Miller Lite (Roger Penske)	Dodge	146	91675	crash	0	55
37	24	7	Robby Gordon	Moen (Robby Gordon)	Toyota	97	92385	crash	0	52
38	28	09	Mike Bliss	Miccosukee Resorts & Gaming (James Finch)	Dodge	62	73525	electrical	0	49
39	38	87	Joe Nemechek	NEMCO Motorsports (Joe Nemechek)	Toyota	40	73475	electrical	0	46
40	36	71	David Gilliland	TaxSlayer.com (Kevin Buckler)	Chevrolet	39	73425	vibration	0	43
41	43	36	Mike Skinner	Guy Fieri Knuckle Sandwich (Tommy Baldwin Jr.)	Toyota	33	73365	vibration	0	40
42	41	66	Dave Blaney	Prism Motorsports (Phil Parsons)	Toyota	18	73290	overheating	0	37
43	33	96	Bobby Labonte	DLP (Jeff Moorad)	Ford	18	100504	engine	0	34
Failed to qualify or withdrew
POS	NAME	NBR	SPONSOR	OWNER	CAR					
44	Tony Raines	37	Long John Silver's	Bob Jenkins	Dodge					
WD	Terry Labonte	08		John Carter	Toyota					
WD	Mike Wallace	64		Larry Gunselman	Toyota					

Preceded by 2009 Heluva Good! Sour Cream Dips at The Glen	NASCAR Sprint Cup Season; 2009	Succeeded by 2009 Sharpie 500
