= Andrew Murstein =

American businessman

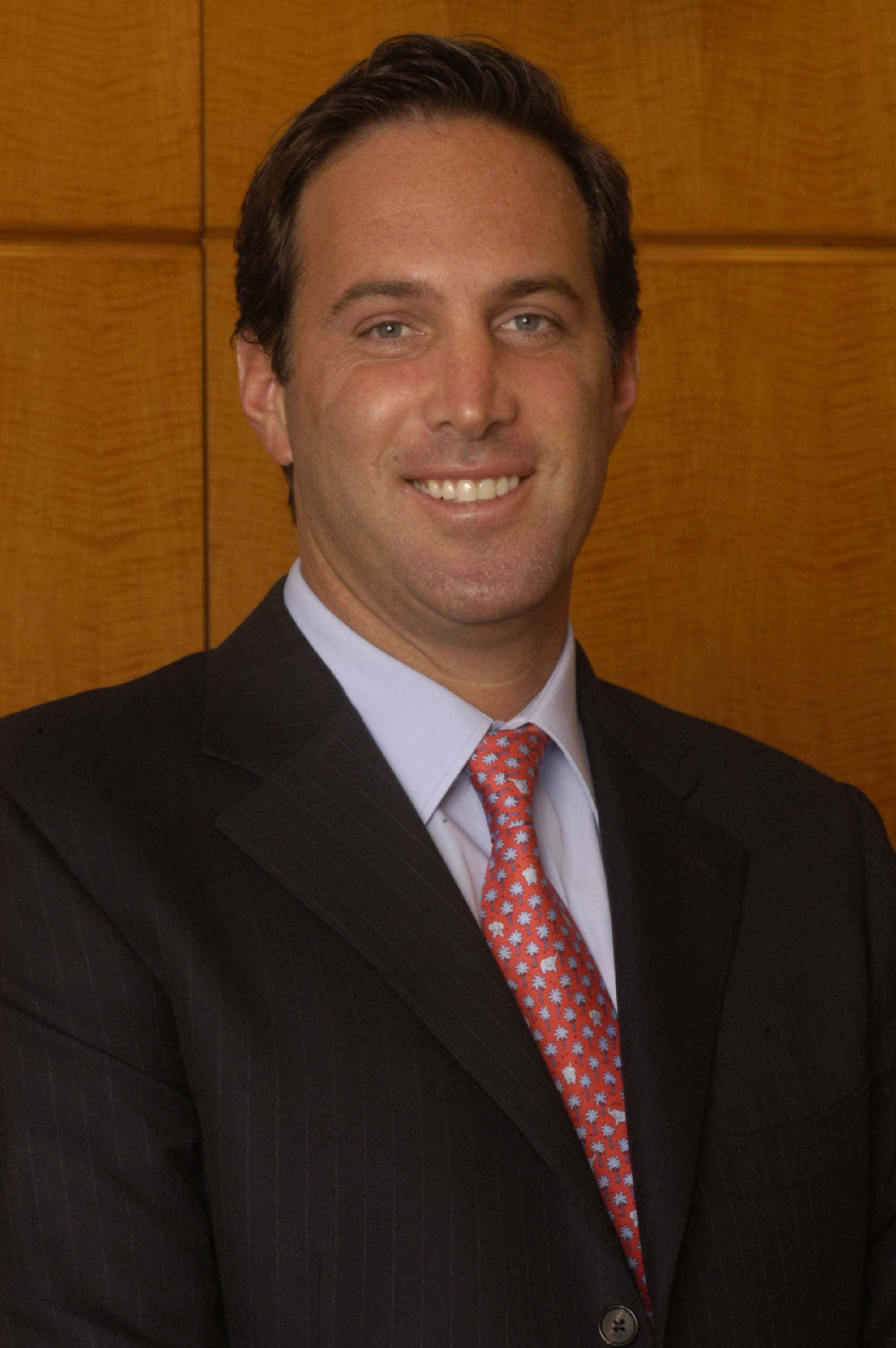
- Murstein in 2007
- Born: Andrew Mead Murstein; June 29, 1964 (age 62); Roslyn, New York
- Education: Tufts University, New York University, M.B.A.
- Occupations: President and board member, Medallion Financial Corp.
- Children: Kimberly Murstein and Matt Murstein

Andrew Mead Murstein (born June 29, 1964) is an American businessman. He is the founder, president, chief executive officer, board member and, with his family, the largest shareholder of Medallion Financial Corp., a finance company that owns a bank and is publicly traded on the Nasdaq stock exchange under the symbol MFIN. MFIN and its predecessor companies have invested over $15 billion in various companies throughout the U.S. Since 2021 Medallion has earned in excess of $350 million before taxes.

In 1994, he was named among Crain's New York Business' "40 Under 40", and has been featured in numerous business publications. In 2013, he was appointed to the Board of the Javits Center. In 2025 he joined the Board of the Hamptons Film Festival. He is also active with the Westminster Kennel Club and was instrumental in their recent move to the Javits Center.

== Early life and education ==
Murstein was born in Roslyn, New York to Alvin and Aileen Murstein. Murstein received a B.A. in economics, cum laude, from Tufts University and an M.B.A. in finance from New York University.

== Start of the medallion business ==
His grandfather of German-Jewish descent, Leon Murstein, came to the United States from Argentina, became a New York cabdriver and purchased one of the first New York taxi medallions, issued in 1937, for $10. The family went on to purchase several hundred medallions for prices as little as $10 each—medallions peaked at over $1,300,000 each but then dropped each year until by 2021 they were selling no more than $85,000 each.

In the 1970’s, Mustrein's father Alvin Murstein founded Medallion Funding Corp. to build a taxi medallion lending business. Medallion Funding earned returns on investment over 20 percent per year.

== Early career ==
After completing his studies at Tufts University and New York University, Murstein spent several years on Wall Street, including time at Salomon Brothers, where he learned the importance of equity in funding a business.

He joined the family business, Medallion Funding full-time in 1990 and eventually took the company public.

In 1996, Murstein successfully launched Medallion Financial Corp., established to be the parent company of Medallion Funding, as a public company trading on the Nasdaq under the symbol MFIN. The company has financed the purchase of thousands more in Newark, Cambridge, Philadelphia, Chicago, Boston and New York City, is an established industry leader. But taxi loans are only a part of the story. The company also established or bought successful businesses that lend to a variety of small businesses such as dry cleaners, convenience stores, manufacturers, distributors, and later public companies.

In 1994, Murstein invested $1 million to create a subsidiary which sold advertising on the tops of taxis. The subsidiary, eventually named Medallion Taxi Media, was enhanced in 1996 with the acquisition of See Level Advertising. Murstein sold Medallion Taxi Media to Clear Channel yielding $35 million in 2004. About this time Medallion Financial Corp. set up its own bank, Medallion Bank, to fund many of the company's endeavors. On February 27, 2009, Medallion accepted an $11.8 million investment from the U.S. Treasury, a security which was repaid on July 21, 2011.

== Decline in medallion values ==
The price of NY City medallions peaked in 2013, as the emergence of ride-hailing companies caused the first significant and sustained decline in medallion values. In order to navigate this challenge, Murstein reduced medallion lending, expanded consumer lending and restructured existing medallion loans. To better communicate the more diversified lending strategy, a stock symbol change was made from "TAXI" to "MFIN" on May 10, 2016 A decision was also made to eliminate the dividend and convert to a C corp from a Business Development Company due to tax and capital considerations. After a steep decline, shares of MFIN began to rebound in the second half of 2017.

By December 12, 2017, 9% senior notes issued by Medallion Financial traded for over 100% of par value, which is a significant recovery from distressed levels reached earlier in 2017, and an indication of improved investor confidence. After a dip at the onset of the COVID-19 pandemic, Medallion Financial's stock price (NASDAQ: MFIN) increased by 5x in the following year.

On May 19, 2019, New York Times published an investigative report on how medallion lending practices effected a generation of taxi drivers, citing Murstein, among others, as moving the industry toward riskier lending practices.

== Other investments ==
In 2008, Murstein along with former baseball player Hank Aaron, former New York Governor Mario Cuomo, both Medallion Financial board members, and former football star and Congressman Jack Kemp, formed a special-purpose acquisition company (SPAC) which raised $230 million to buy a professional sports team. The SPAC reportedly bid for the Chicago Cubs and other sports properties but ended up not making a purchase because none of the properties the company evaluated had the right mix of profit potential and risk avoidance. Later that same year, Murstein organized and filed publicly a SPAC focused on the security industry and assembled a board of directors that included former FBI Director Louis Freeh and former Pennsylvania Governor and Homeland Security Secretary Tom Ridge.

In 2012, Medallion Sports Group, along with partners Richard Mack and NFL player Jim Brown, Murstein acquired the Long Island Lizards of Major League Lacrosse, and renamed the team the New York Lizards. The team played at Hofstra University on Long Island and won the MLL championship for the third time in 2015.

== NASCAR team ownership ==
On November 8, 2010, Medallion Financial Corp., as part of an investment group which included Richard Petty, acquired the racing assets of NASCAR's Richard Petty Motorsports. In 2017, Murstein and Petty announced that they had hired Darrell "Bubba" Wallace Jr., to drive the No. 43 car, becoming the first African-American driver to drive regularly in NASCAR's premier Cup Series in over 40 years. After the 2021 NASCAR Cup Series season, Murstein sold his stake in Richard Petty Motorsports (the majority ownership) to Maury Gallagher, the Chairman and CEO of Allegiant Air and owner of NASCAR team GMS Racing. As a result, RPM was renamed Petty GMS Motorsports.
