= 2009 Heluva Good! Sour Cream Dips at The Glen =

Race details
- Race 22 of 36 in the 2009 NASCAR Sprint Cup Series
- The short course at Watkins Glen International
- Date: August 10, 2009
- Location: Watkins Glen International in Watkins Glen, New York
- Course: Permanent racing facility
- Course length: 2.45 miles (3.942 km)
- Distance: 90 laps, 220.5 mi (354.86 km)
- Weather: Temperatures up to 90 °F (32 °C); wind speeds up to 14 miles per hour (23 km/h)
- Average speed: 90.297 miles per hour (145.319 km/h)
- Attendance: 85,000

Pole position
Driver	Jimmie Johnson	Hendrick Motorsports
- Time: 71.340

Most laps led
Driver	Tony Stewart	Stewart–Haas Racing
- Laps: 34

Winner
No. 14	Tony Stewart	Stewart–Haas Racing

Television in the United States
- Network: ESPN
- Announcers: Jerry Punch, Andy Petree and Dale Jarrett

The 2009 Heluva Good! Sour Cream Dips at the Glen was a NASCAR Sprint Cup Series event held on August 10, 2009, at Watkins Glen International.

The race was rained out on the original scheduled day of August 9. The race was won by points leader Tony Stewart, his third win of the year. Stewart scored his fifth win at Watkins Glen. With that win, he passed Jeff Gordon as the all time NASCAR winner at the Glen. As of 2019, that record still stands. Also with his win in that race, Tony Stewart would score his seventh career road course win, breaking him out a four-way tie for second in all time road course wins with Bobby Allison, Rusty Wallace, and Ricky Rudd. Stewart would win an additional road course race at Sonoma in 2016, the year he retired. As of 2019, Tony Stewart is currently in second place with eight road course wins, as Jeff Gordon currently holds the all-time record with nine wins.

During the race, a hard crash involving Sam Hornish Jr., Jeff Gordon, and Jeff Burton, left the drivers shaken but alright. Kasey Kahne got loose under Hornish and Hornish slid hard into the tire barrier. Then Hornish spun back onto the track and Gordon had no way to avoid him and they made hard contact sending Gordon head on into the Armco barrier and Hornish into Jeff Burton, which nearly sent Hornish on his side. Gordon's hit into Hornish ended up destroying the whole rear of Hornish's car including ripping out the fuel cell.

In the late stages of the race, fuel mileage was an issue but no one had any problems. Stewart held off a strong Marcos Ambrose for the win. Drivers from five countries were in the race including the United States of America, Australia, Colombia, Italy and Canada. A crowd of 85,000 live spectators watched this 146-minute racing event where the average green flag run was almost 13 laps long. Owing to the high number of accidents and resulting amount of debris, more than 14% of the event was raced under a caution flag.

== Top ten finishers ==
Pos	Grid	No.	Driver	Manufacturer	Laps	Laps led
1	13	14	Tony Stewart	Chevrolet	90	34
2	4	47	Marcos Ambrose	Toyota	90	9
3	33	99	Carl Edwards	Ford	90	0
4	8	18	Kyle Busch	Toyota	90	15
5	7	16	Greg Biffle	Ford	90	0
6	10	42	Juan Pablo Montoya	Chevrolet	90	0
7	2	2	Kurt Busch	Dodge	90	23
8	16	13	Max Papis	Toyota	90	0
9	38	33	Clint Bowyer	Chevrolet	90	0
10	3	11	Denny Hamlin	Toyota	90	0

== Timeline ==
Section reference:

- Start of race: Kurt Busch had the pole position as the green flag was waved
- Lap 20: Marcos Ambrose took over the lead from Kurt Busch
- Lap 28: Kurt Busch took over the lead from Marcos Ambrose
- Lap 29: Marcos Ambrose took over the lead from Kurt Busch
- Lap 30: Jimmie Johnson took over the lead from Marcos Ambrose
- Lap 34: Kyle Busch took over the lead from Jimmie Johnson
- Lap 46: Tony Stewart took over the lead from Kyle Busch
- Lap 56: Kurt Busch took over the lead from Tony Stewart
- Lap 59: David Stremme took over the lead from Kurt Busch
- Lap 60: Scott Speed took over the lead from David Stremme
- Lap 64: Kyle Busch took over the lead from Scott Speed
- Lap 67: Tony Stewart took over the lead from Kyle Busch
- Finish: Tony Stewart was officially declared the winner of the event

== Standings after the race ==
Pos	Driver	Points
1	Tony Stewart	3383
2	Jimmie Johnson	3123
3	Jeff Gordon	3041
4	Kurt Busch	2902
5	Denny Hamlin	2847

Preceded by 2009 Sunoco Red Cross Pennsylvania 500	NASCAR Sprint Cup Season; 2009	Succeeded by 2009 Carfax 400
