= 2009 Sharpie 500 =

Race details
- Race 24 of 36 in the 2009 NASCAR Sprint Cup Series season
- Date: August 22, 2009
- Official name: Sharpie 500
- Location: Bristol Motor Speedway, Bristol, Tennessee
- Course: Permanent racing facility
- Course length: 0.533 miles (0.857 km)
- Distance: 500 laps, 266.5 mi (428.89 km)
- Weather: Temperatures up to 82 °F (28 °C); wind speeds up to 8.9 miles per hour (14.3 km/h)
- Average speed: 80.24 miles per hour (129.13 km/h)

Pole position
Driver	Mark Martin	Hendrick Motorsports
- Time: 15.414

Most laps led
Driver	Mark Martin	Hendrick Motorsports
- Laps: 240

Winner
No. 18	Kyle Busch	Joe Gibbs Racing

Television in the United States
- Network: ESPN
- Announcers: Jerry Punch, Andy Petree and Dale Jarrett

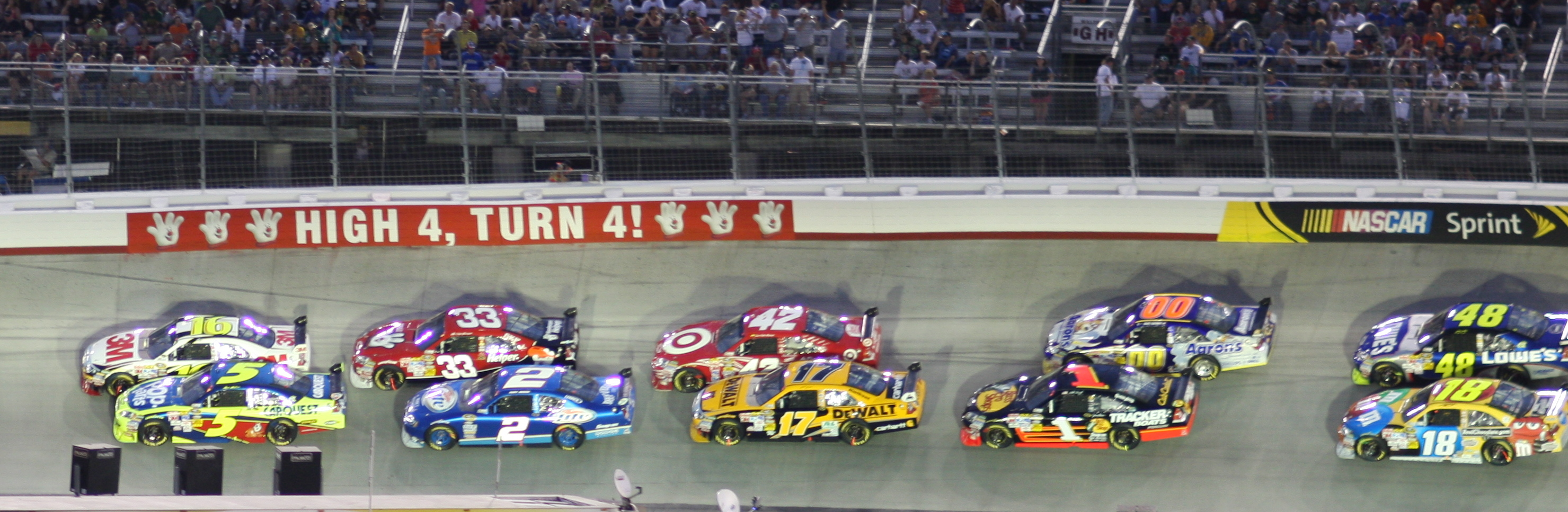

The 2009 Sharpie 500 was a NASCAR Sprint Cup Series stock car race that was held on August 22, 2009, at Bristol Motor Speedway in Bristol, Tennessee.

The 500 lap race was the twenty-fourth in the 2009 NASCAR Sprint Cup Series. Kyle Busch, of the Joe Gibbs Racing team, won the race, with Mark Martin finishing second, and Marcos Ambrose third. There were 11 cautions and 12 lead changes throughout the course of the race.

== Summary ==
It took three hours, eight minutes and thirty-one seconds to fully resolve the race. An incredibly packed racetrack of 160,000 people would see eleven cautions for a duration of 76 laps. Approximately 15% of the race was held under caution; with accidents being the predominant cause of the yellow flags. Four drivers failed to make the race: Mike Skinner, Max Papis, Mike Wallace and Aric Almirola. The average green flag run was 35 laps; with a ten-lap caution period for rain.

Dave Blaney was the worst driver of the 2009 NASCAR Sprint Cup Season coming out of this race with a last-place finish; leaving the race on lap 8 due to an accident. Mark Martin was the undisputed best driver in the 2009 Sprint Cup Series season after this event; even though he finished in second place behind Kyle Busch.

Gambling pundits were marvelled over Kyle Busch's victory in the 2009 Spring Bristol race along with another previous win at the Spring 2007 Bristol race. The same critics would pan the inferior performance of Kevin Harvick at Bristol Motor Speedway; acquiring only an average finish of 11th place in the seventeen previous races at Bristol before this one.

=== Top ten finishers ===
Pos	Grid	No.	Driver	Manufacturer	Laps	Laps led
1	15	18	Kyle Busch	Toyota	500	68
2	1	5	Mark Martin	Chevrolet	500	240
3	25	47	Marcos Ambrose	Toyota	500	0
4	2	16	Greg Biffle	Ford	500	76
5	41	11	Denny Hamlin	Toyota	500	0
6	9	39	Ryan Newman	Chevrolet	500	0
7	13	2	Kurt Busch	Dodge	500	0
8	21	48	Jimmie Johnson	Chevrolet	500	107
9	27	88	Dale Earnhardt Jr.	Chevrolet	500	0
10	5	17	Matt Kenseth	Ford	500	0

== Timeline ==
- Start of race: Mark Martin started with race in first place
- Lap 8: Dave Blaney had a terminal crash; forcing him to become the last-place driver
- Lap 27: Tony Raines had problems with his transmission and had to exit from the race
- Lap 48: Joe Nemechek developed wheel bearing issues in his vehicle; making him the second DNF of the event
- Lap 244: Terry Labonte cracked his vehicle's rear end; causing his race weekend to end suddenly
- Lap 353: David Gilliand had a terminal crash; which prevented him from getting a respectable finish
- Lap 438: Kevin Harvick had a terminal crash; forcing him to leave the race prematurely
- Lap 490: Michael Waltrip had a terminal crash; ending any hopes of getting a "top 10" finish
- Finish: Kyle Busch was officially declared the winner of the event
