= 2013 NASCAR Sprint Cup Series =

American motorsport season

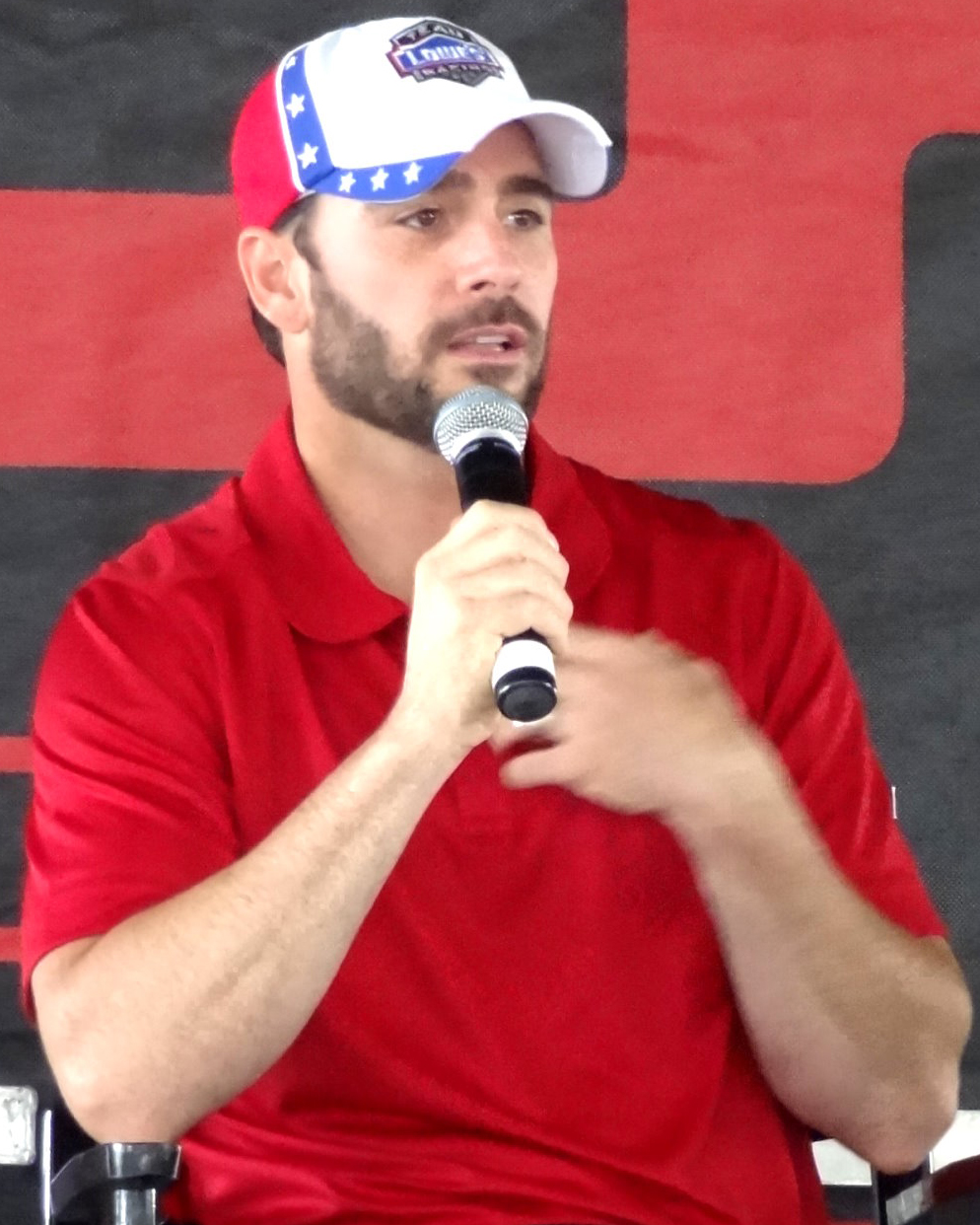
Jimmie Johnson, the 2013 Sprint Cup Series champion; his sixth title.

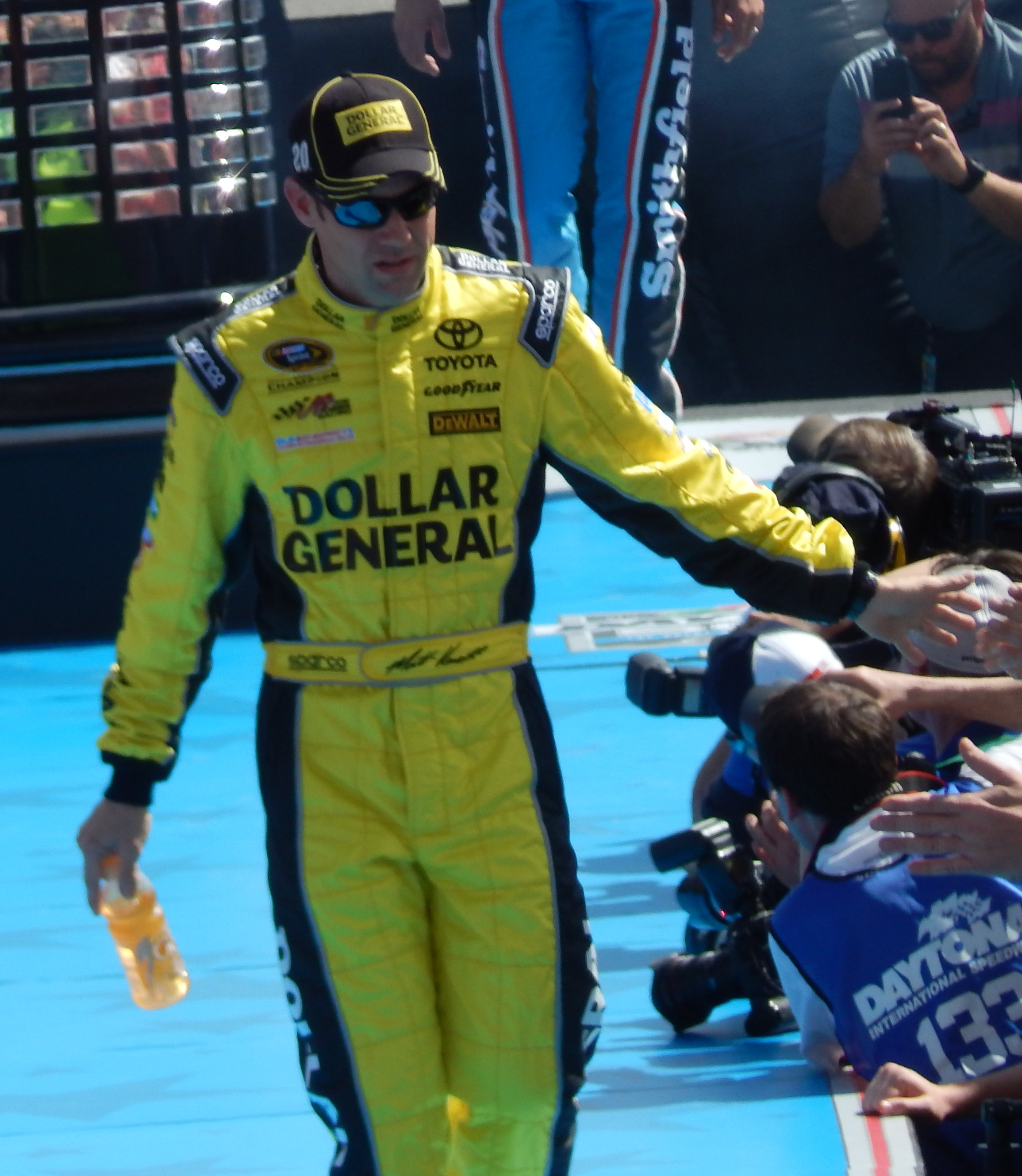
Matt Kenseth finished 19 points behind Johnson in second place.

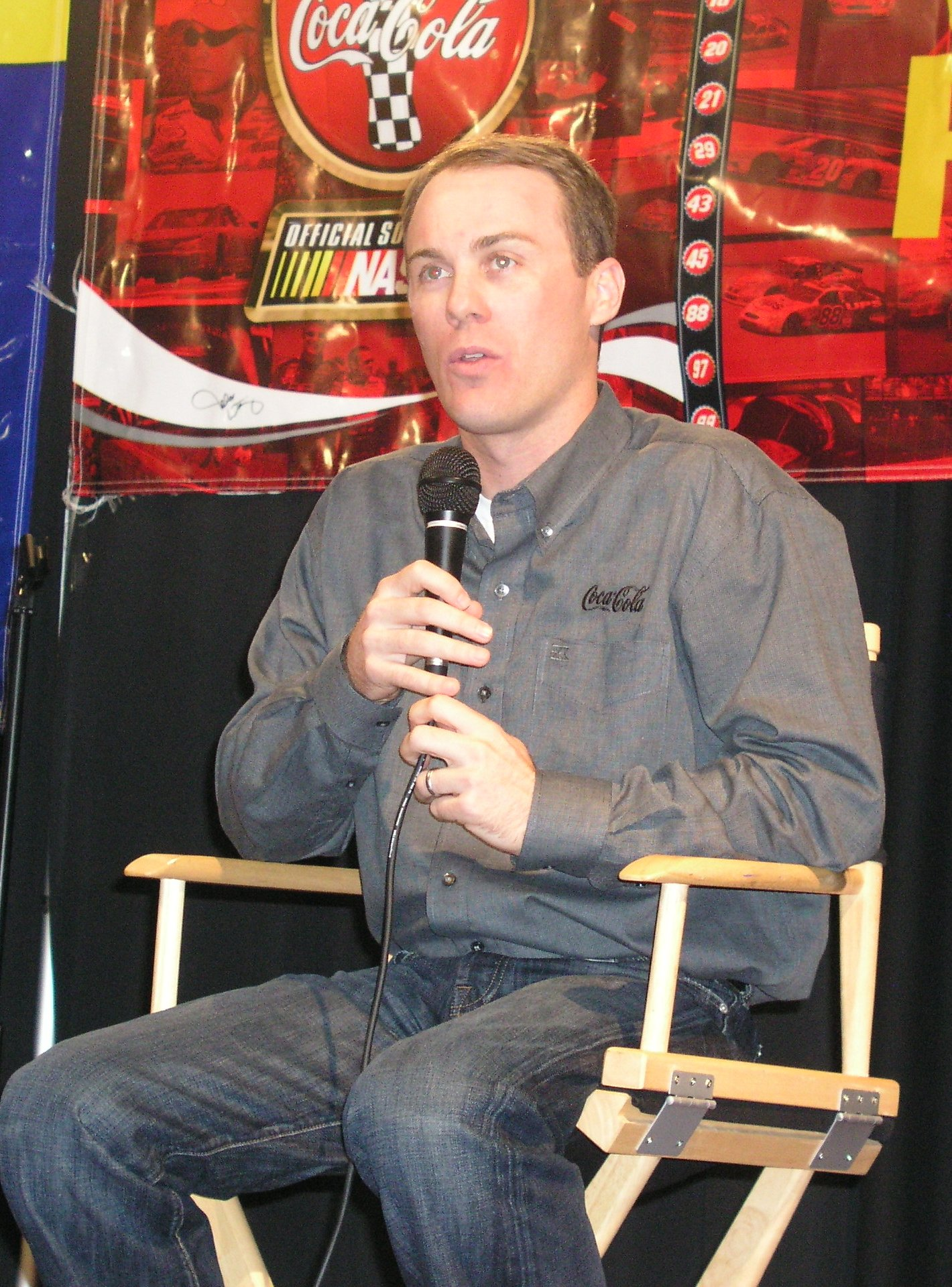
Kevin Harvick finished third, 34 points behind Johnson.

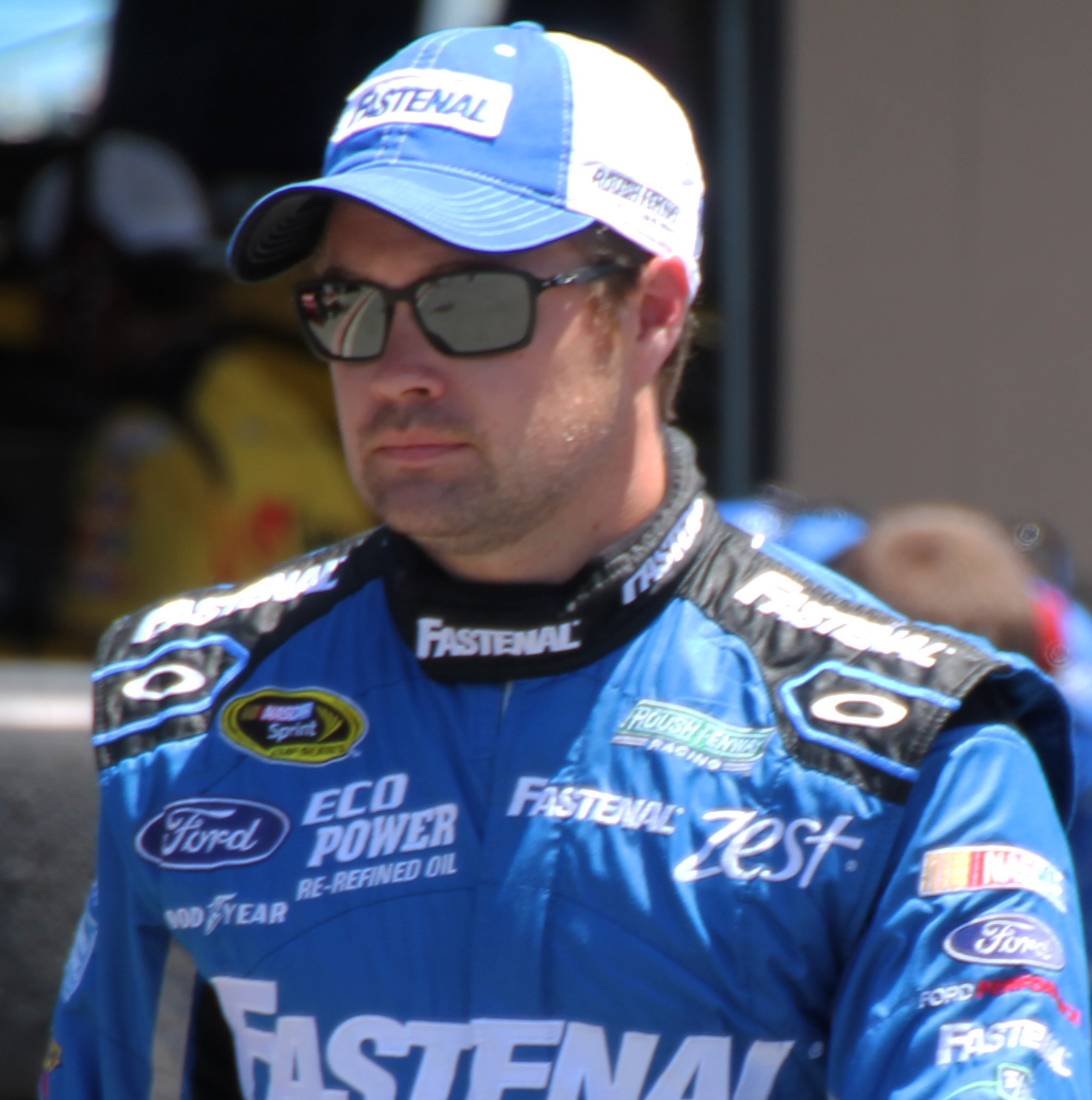
Ricky Stenhouse Jr., the 2013 NASCAR Rookie of the Year.

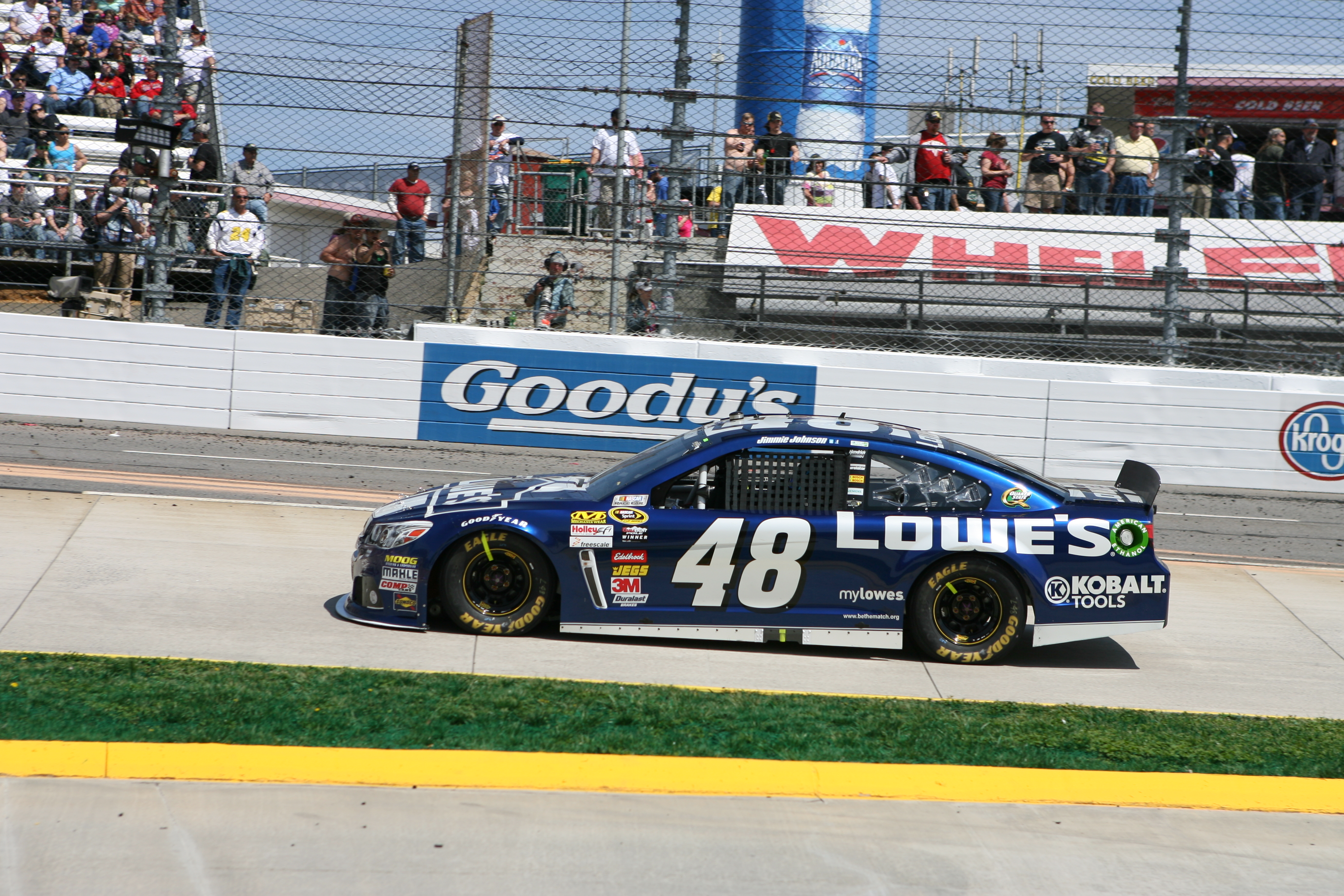
Chevrolet won the Manufacturer's championship with 16 wins & 254 points.

The 2013 NASCAR Sprint Cup Series was the 65th season of NASCAR professional stock car racing in the United States and the 42nd modern-era Cup season. The season began on February 16, 2013, at Daytona International Speedway with the Sprint Unlimited, followed by the Daytona 500 on February 24. The season ended with the Ford EcoBoost 400 at Homestead–Miami Speedway on November 17.

The 2013 season was the first season using the Generation 6 race car, the Car of Tomorrow's successor, and marked the return to the qualifying procedure that was used before the 2005 season. However, at the two road courses on the schedule drivers qualified in groups instead of single laps. In September 2012, NASCAR removed a ban introduced in the 2008 season on testing at tracks that were on any of the premier series' schedules, replacing it with a testing limit.

Chevrolet entered the season as the reigning Manufacturer's Champions, while Brad Keselowski was the reigning Drivers' Champion. However, because Keselowski failed to make the Chase, he was unable to defend his title. By the end of the season, Jimmie Johnson claimed his sixth Sprint Cup Championship. This was the final full season and final starts for Mark Martin, Scott Riggs, Scott Speed, Ron Fellows, Kevin Swindell, Jason Leffler, Brian Keselowski, Tony Raines, Owen Kelly, and Paulie Harraka.

The season was also marred by the death of Jason Leffler, 3 days after making his final Cup start at Pocono in June. Leffler would be the last overall driver to pass away during a season since Dale Earnhardt's death in 2001 until 2026, when Kyle Busch died from pneumonia and sepsis at the age of 41.

This was the last season until 2026 to feature a 10-race Chase format, as the 2014 to 2025 seasons would feature a four-round elimination playoff format across the final 10 races instead.

== Teams and drivers ==
=== Complete schedule ===
There were 40 full-time teams in 2013.

Manufacturer	Team	No.	Race Driver	Crew Chief
Chevrolet	Earnhardt Ganassi Racing	1	Jamie McMurray	Kevin Manion
Chevrolet	Earnhardt Ganassi Racing	42	Juan Pablo Montoya	Chris Heroy
Chevrolet	Furniture Row Racing	78	Kurt Busch	Todd Berrier
Chevrolet	Hendrick Motorsports	5	Kasey Kahne	Kenny Francis
Chevrolet	Hendrick Motorsports	24	Jeff Gordon	Alan Gustafson
Chevrolet	Hendrick Motorsports	48	Jimmie Johnson	Chad Knaus
Chevrolet	Hendrick Motorsports	88	Dale Earnhardt Jr.	Steve Letarte
Chevrolet	Phoenix Racing (Finch) 25; Phoenix Racing (Scott) 11	51	Regan Smith 6	Nick Harrison 30; Jimmy Elledge 6
Chevrolet	Phoenix Racing (Finch) 25; Phoenix Racing (Scott) 11	51	A. J. Allmendinger 9	Nick Harrison 30; Jimmy Elledge 6
Chevrolet	Phoenix Racing (Finch) 25; Phoenix Racing (Scott) 11	51	Austin Dillon 4	Nick Harrison 30; Jimmy Elledge 6
Chevrolet	Phoenix Racing (Finch) 25; Phoenix Racing (Scott) 11	51	Bobby Labonte 1	Nick Harrison 30; Jimmy Elledge 6
Chevrolet	Phoenix Racing (Finch) 25; Phoenix Racing (Scott) 11	51	Jacques Villeneuve 1	Nick Harrison 30; Jimmy Elledge 6
Chevrolet	Phoenix Racing (Finch) 25; Phoenix Racing (Scott) 11	51	Owen Kelly 1	Nick Harrison 30; Jimmy Elledge 6
Chevrolet	Phoenix Racing (Finch) 25; Phoenix Racing (Scott) 11	51	Brendan Gaughan 1	Nick Harrison 30; Jimmy Elledge 6
Chevrolet	Phoenix Racing (Finch) 25; Phoenix Racing (Scott) 11	51	Ryan Truex 3	Nick Harrison 30; Jimmy Elledge 6
Chevrolet	Phoenix Racing (Finch) 25; Phoenix Racing (Scott) 11	51	Mike Bliss 1	Nick Harrison 30; Jimmy Elledge 6
Chevrolet	Phoenix Racing (Finch) 25; Phoenix Racing (Scott) 11	51	Justin Allgaier 4	Nick Harrison 30; Jimmy Elledge 6
Chevrolet	Phoenix Racing (Finch) 25; Phoenix Racing (Scott) 11	51	Michael McDowell 1	Nick Harrison 30; Jimmy Elledge 6
Chevrolet	Phoenix Racing (Finch) 25; Phoenix Racing (Scott) 11	51	Kyle Larson 4	Nick Harrison 30; Jimmy Elledge 6
Chevrolet	Richard Childress Racing	27	Paul Menard	Slugger Labbe
Chevrolet	Richard Childress Racing	29	Kevin Harvick	Gil Martin
Chevrolet	Richard Childress Racing	31	Jeff Burton	Luke Lambert 34; Ernie Cope 1 Matt McCall 1
Chevrolet	Richard Childress Racing	33	Austin Dillon 5	Scott Naset 6 Ryan Wellman 4 John Rahlf 23; Shane Wilson 1 Mike Abner 2
Chevrolet	Richard Childress Racing	33	Brian Scott 1	Scott Naset 6 Ryan Wellman 4 John Rahlf 23; Shane Wilson 1 Mike Abner 2
Chevrolet	Circle Sport	33	Landon Cassill 21	Scott Naset 6 Ryan Wellman 4 John Rahlf 23; Shane Wilson 1 Mike Abner 2
Chevrolet	Circle Sport	33	Ron Fellows 2	Scott Naset 6 Ryan Wellman 4 John Rahlf 23; Shane Wilson 1 Mike Abner 2
Chevrolet	Circle Sport	33	Tony Raines 7	Scott Naset 6 Ryan Wellman 4 John Rahlf 23; Shane Wilson 1 Mike Abner 2
Chevrolet	Stewart–Haas Racing	10	Danica Patrick (R)	Tony Gibson
Chevrolet	Stewart–Haas Racing	14	Tony Stewart 21	Steve Addington 35; Greg Zipadelli 1
Chevrolet	Stewart–Haas Racing	14	Max Papis 1	Steve Addington 35; Greg Zipadelli 1
Chevrolet	Stewart–Haas Racing	14	Austin Dillon 2	Steve Addington 35; Greg Zipadelli 1
Chevrolet	Stewart–Haas Racing	14	Mark Martin 12	Steve Addington 35; Greg Zipadelli 1
Chevrolet	Stewart–Haas Racing	39	Ryan Newman	Matt Borland
Chevrolet	Tommy Baldwin Racing	7	Dave Blaney 35	Tommy Baldwin Jr.
Chevrolet	Tommy Baldwin Racing	7	Justin Marks 1	Tommy Baldwin Jr.
Chevrolet	Tommy Baldwin Racing	36	J. J. Yeley 34	Joe Lax
Chevrolet	Tommy Baldwin Racing	36	Victor Gonzalez Jr. 2	Joe Lax
Ford	FAS Lane Racing	32	Terry Labonte 5	Frank Stoddard
Ford	FAS Lane Racing	32	Ken Schrader 10	Frank Stoddard
Ford	FAS Lane Racing	32	Timmy Hill (R) 19	Frank Stoddard
Ford	FAS Lane Racing	32	Boris Said 2	Frank Stoddard
Ford	Front Row Motorsports	34	David Ragan	Jay Guy
Ford	Front Row Motorsports	35	Josh Wise 35	Steve Lane 5 Derrick Finley 9 Todd Anderson 22
Ford	Front Row Motorsports	35	Michael McDowell 1	Steve Lane 5 Derrick Finley 9 Todd Anderson 22
Ford	Front Row Motorsports	38	David Gilliland	Frank Kerr
Ford	Germain Racing	13	Casey Mears	Bootie Barker
Ford	Penske Racing	2	Brad Keselowski	Paul Wolfe 34; Kevin Buskirk 2
Ford	Penske Racing	22	Joey Logano	Todd Gordon 34; Steve Reis 2
Ford	Richard Petty Motorsports	9	Marcos Ambrose	Drew Blickensderfer
Ford	Richard Petty Motorsports	43	Aric Almirola	Todd Parrott 31; Sammy Johns 1 Greg Ebert 4
Ford	Roush Fenway Racing	16	Greg Biffle	Matt Puccia
Ford	Roush Fenway Racing	17	Ricky Stenhouse Jr. (R)	Scott Graves
Ford	Roush Fenway Racing	99	Carl Edwards	Jimmy Fennig
Toyota	BK Racing	83	David Reutimann	Pat Tryson 19; Doug Richert 17
Toyota	BK Racing	93	Travis Kvapil	Todd Anderson 11; Mike Ford 5 Dale Ferguson 20
Toyota	Joe Gibbs Racing	11	Denny Hamlin 32	Darian Grubb
Toyota	Joe Gibbs Racing	11	Mark Martin 1	Darian Grubb
Toyota	Joe Gibbs Racing	11	Brian Vickers 3	Darian Grubb
Toyota	Joe Gibbs Racing	18	Kyle Busch	Dave Rogers
Toyota	Joe Gibbs Racing	20	Matt Kenseth	Jason Ratcliff 35; Wally Brown 1
Toyota	JTG Daugherty Racing	47	Bobby Labonte 27	Brian Burns
Toyota	JTG Daugherty Racing	47	A. J. Allmendinger 9	Brian Burns
Toyota	Michael Waltrip Racing	15	Clint Bowyer	Brian Pattie
Toyota	Michael Waltrip Racing	55	Mark Martin 15	Rodney Childers 24; Scott Miller 12
Toyota	Michael Waltrip Racing	55	Brian Vickers 14	Rodney Childers 24; Scott Miller 12
Toyota	Michael Waltrip Racing	55	Michael Waltrip 3	Rodney Childers 24; Scott Miller 12
Toyota	Michael Waltrip Racing	55	Elliott Sadler 4	Rodney Childers 24; Scott Miller 12
Toyota	Michael Waltrip Racing	56	Martin Truex Jr.	Chad Johnston
Toyota	NEMCO-Jay Robinson Racing	87	Joe Nemechek 34	Scott Eggleston
Toyota	NEMCO-Jay Robinson Racing	87	Tomy Drissi 2	Scott Eggleston
Toyota	Swan Racing	30	Michael Waltrip 1	Tony Eury Jr. 8 Steve Lane 28
Toyota	Swan Racing	30	David Stremme 25	Tony Eury Jr. 8 Steve Lane 28
Toyota	Swan Racing	30	Cole Whitt 7	Tony Eury Jr. 8 Steve Lane 28
Toyota	Swan Racing	30	Kevin Swindell 1	Tony Eury Jr. 8 Steve Lane 28
Toyota	Swan Racing	30	Parker Kligerman 2	Tony Eury Jr. 8 Steve Lane 28

=== Limited schedule ===
Manufacturer	Team	No.	Race Driver	Crew Chief	Round(s)
Chevrolet	Circle Sport	40	Landon Cassill	John Rahlf 2 Mike Abner 14	12
Chevrolet	Circle Sport	40	Tony Raines	John Rahlf 2 Mike Abner 14	4
Chevrolet	Max Q Motorsports	37	J. J. Yeley	James Parrott	1
Ford	Leavine Family Racing	95	Scott Speed	Wally Rogers	14
Ford	Leavine Family Racing	95	Reed Sorenson	Wally Rogers	6
Ford	Leavine Family Racing	95	Scott Riggs	Wally Rogers	1
Ford	Leavine Family Racing	95	Blake Koch	Wally Rogers	1
Ford	Penske Racing	12	Sam Hornish Jr.	Greg Erwin	2
Ford	Phil Parsons Racing	98	Michael McDowell	Gene Nead	31
Ford	Phil Parsons Racing	98	Johnny Sauter	Gene Nead	2
Ford	Wood Brothers Racing	21	Trevor Bayne	Donnie Wingo	12
Ford	Xxxtreme Motorsport	44	Scott Riggs	Tony Furr 5 Walter Giles 4	9
Toyota	Humphrey Smith Racing	19	Mike Bliss	Peter Sospenzo	18
Toyota	Humphrey Smith Racing	19	Jason Leffler	Peter Sospenzo	1
Toyota	Humphrey Smith Racing	19	Alex Kennedy	Peter Sospenzo	3
Toyota	Humphrey Smith Racing	19	Scott Riggs	Peter Sospenzo	1
Toyota	Joe Gibbs Racing	81	Elliott Sadler	Chris Gayle	2
Toyota 4 Ford 1	Brian Keselowski Motorsports; Hamilton Means Racing	52	Brian Keselowski	Bob Keselowski 1	3
Toyota 4 Ford 1	Brian Keselowski Motorsports; Hamilton Means Racing	52	Morgan Shepherd	Ben Leslie 4	1
Toyota 4 Ford 1	Go Green Racing	52	Paulie Harraka	Ben Leslie 4	1

=== Team changes ===
- Penske Racing changed their manufacturer to Ford after being with Dodge since 2003. Penske had collaborated with Ford from 1994 through 2002.
- During the off-season, Inception Motorsports was purchased by Swan Energy Inc. CEO Brandon Davis, renaming the team to Swan Racing. However, David Stremme remained as the driver of the team's car.
- Tommy Baldwin Racing changed the number of their primary car from 36 to 7 in honor of former Modified Series driver Tom Baldwin Sr., the father of team owner Tommy Baldwin Jr.
- During the season, James Finch announced that he would sell Phoenix Racing, and that his final race as owner of the team would be the Crown Royal presents the Samuel Deeds 400 at the Brickyard which was later changed to the AdvoCare 500.

=== Driver changes ===
- 2011 and 2012 Nationwide Series champion Ricky Stenhouse Jr. drove the No. 17 Ford Fusion to replace Matt Kenseth, who decided not to renew his contract with Roush Fenway Racing after his fourteenth season with the team. Stenhouse Jr. ran the No. 6 Ford Mustang for RFR from 2009 to 2011 in the Nationwide Series.
- Kenseth later replaced Joey Logano in the No. 20 at Joe Gibbs Racing.
- Logano, who had been racing for Joe Gibbs Racing since the 2008 season, replaced A. J. Allmendinger – who had been suspended from the series in July 2012 – and his temporary replacement Sam Hornish Jr. at Penske Racing.
- Furniture Row Racing chose not to retain Regan Smith, instead choosing the 2004 season champion, Kurt Busch for the 2013 season, and for the final six races of the 2012 season. Busch was previously with the Phoenix Racing team during the 2012 season. Smith later moved to the Nationwide Series to drive for the JR Motorsports team for the 2013 season. *Afterward, Phoenix Racing announced that Smith would drive in the 2013 Daytona 500 for the team.
- After conflicts arose over payment for 2012 and 2013, Landon Cassill left BK Racing. David Reutimann, who drove for the team in the Daytona 500 and at Darlington during 2012, drove the No. 83 full-time instead. Cassill later joined Circle Sport.

== Changes ==
=== Generation 6 car ===
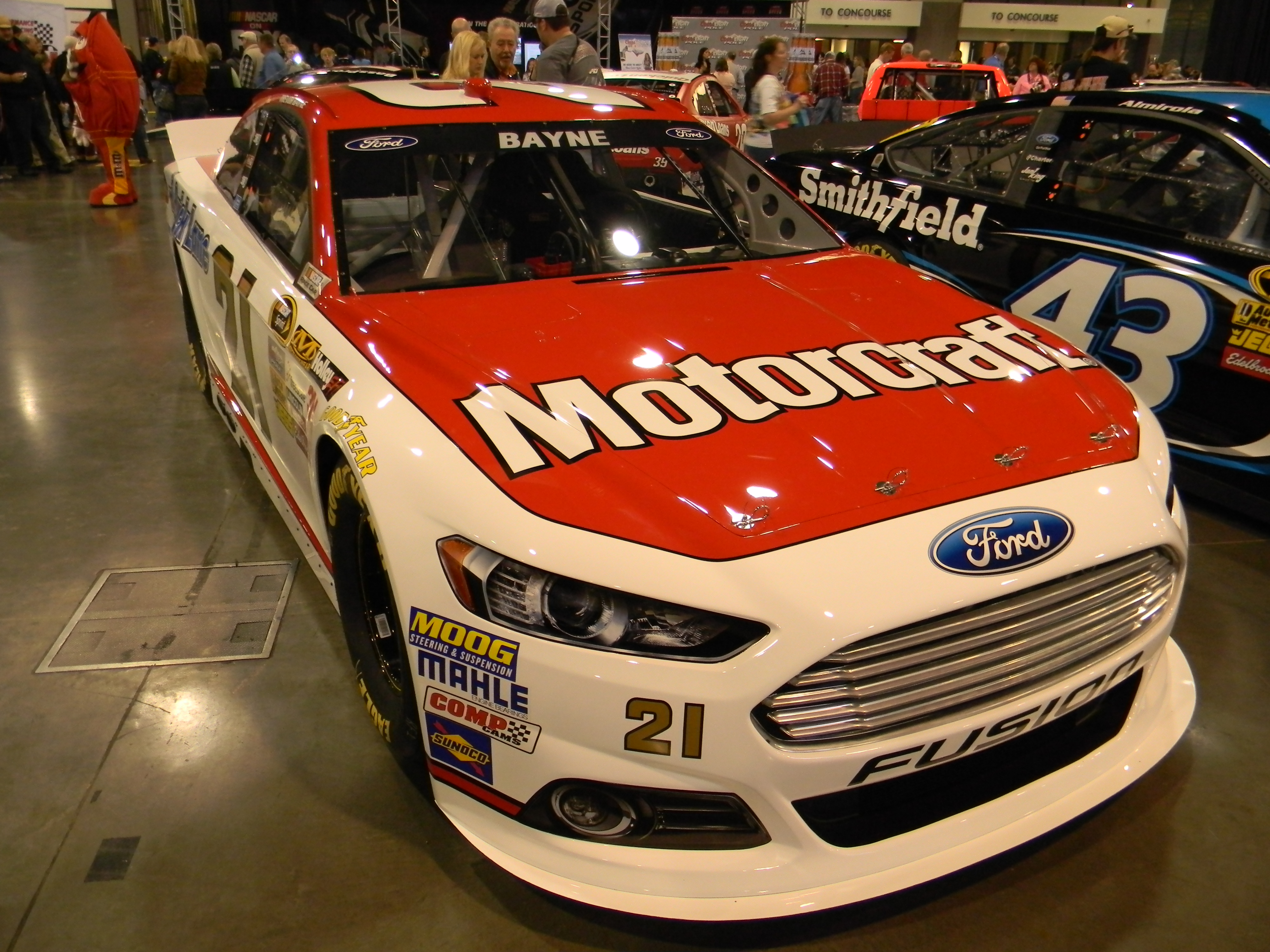
The sixth-generation NASCAR Ford Fusion, introduced for the 2013 season.

In preparation for the 2013 season, NASCAR allowed the manufacturers participating in the series to develop a new car that resembled the production models. Areas of the car that were allowed to be changed were the area above the doors, hood and truck lid.

Ford was the first to announce their 2013 car on January 24, 2012, with the Ford Fusion; however, the company modified the car in June 2012 by designing a new grille and hood lines. Afterward, Dodge revealed their 2013 Dodge Charger, while Chevrolet announced that the Chevrolet Impala would no longer race in the series, instead the Chevrolet SS, expected to go into production in 2014, would. On May 22, 2012, Toyota announced that the Toyota Camry would continue to be their race model for the 2013 season.

On July 30, 2012, NASCAR approved each of the manufacturer's design after the results of the final aerodynamic test, allowing them to begin making parts for the cars. The new cars are expected to premiere in the 2013 Daytona Speedweeks. Dodge announced on August 7, 2012, that it would not participate in the series during the 2013 season after recording 55 victories in the previous eleven years.

To benefit the safety of the drivers, NASCAR improved the roll cage surrounding the driver after a large amount of testing in the NASCAR Research and Development Center. The improvement featured a new forward roof bar and center roof support bar intersecting in the center of the front section of the roll cage. NASCAR later released cosmetic changes to the 2013 car, including the driver's last name on the windshield, the sponsor's logo placed on the roof, the team logo being moved from the headlights to the front bumper, and the reduction in size of contingency decals and car numbers due to the smaller size of the car. During the Autoweek's Racing Conference in Detroit, Michigan, NASCAR announced that the manufacturer logos would be placed on either side of the drivers' name to increase manufacturer identity.

Starting with the Subway Fresh Fit 500, the roof camera was removed for approximately two-thirds of points races to lessen turbulent air impact, though tracks like Daytona International Speedway, Talladega Superspeedway, Sonoma Raceway and Watkins Glen International retained the cameras.

=== Rule changes ===
After banning all testing on tracks where any of the three premier series sanction races in 2008, NASCAR announced on September 29, 2012, that they will implement limited testing at tracks which sanction a race on the schedule. However, NASCAR stated that each organization is only allowed to test four different times, with each test at a different track. Rookie of the Year participants were allowed one extra test session, while NASCAR chose two other events for extra testing during the race weekend. NASCAR changed the car inspection process as well. The new process involves a laser mechanism which scans different parts of the car. Teams were first introduced to this new inspection process during the Talladega Superspeedway and Martinsville Speedway testing. It was also used during preseason testing at Charlotte Motor Speedway to make sure it doesn't have any problems.

Furthermore, NASCAR removed the top-35 qualifying rule that was introduced in 2005 to revert to the previous qualifying rule. The rule was originally established so that full-time teams, as well as their sponsors, were ensured a spot in the race when 50+ cars attempted to race. For 2013, the top 36 starting positions were set by qualifying speed. Positions 37 to 42 were set by provisionals (based on owners points). Similar to previous seasons, the forty-third position were given to the most recent series champion who didn't qualify on time or the next available team in owner's points. Unlike in previous years, the previous years' Owners points were only used for the first three races of a season instead of five. Also, NASCAR instituted a random draw to determine qualifying order instead of inverting the first practice speeds. Director of Competition Robin Pemberton stated the change was made due to teams manipulating their first practice run to get a later qualifying draw.

On January 9, 2013, the sanctioning body disclosed changes to track drying processes. At first, Brian France wanted to shorten waiting times by 80 percent, but he expects it to improve by 60 percent, stating, "We won't be at 80 percent, but we're going to be dramatically better with a whole new system on how to dry the track as much as 60 percent (faster) and we will get to the 80 percent goal." Instead of jet dryers, track crews had a vacuum following a different air-powered system. Afterward, France said, "We're patenting some technology that (uses) air pressure. Think of it as giant tanks, scuba tanks, that drive air out and blow water – or anything else – off the surface in a dramatically better way. It's a big solution. We're not (all the way) there yet, but it's ready now." However, as NASCAR is requiring tracks to pay for its rental during race weekends, very few races have actually had the system available for use. While the race at Talladega was able to be run to completion during daylight hours thanks to the new system, the race at Chicago saw a 6-hour delay due to rain and the time it took to dry the track using conventional jet dryers.

In response to the ongoing controversy over start and park teams, NASCAR decided to reallocate money from the last five finishing positions to the remainder of the field, making the practice less profitable.

NASCAR announced on April 22 that qualifying for the road course races at Sonoma Raceway and Watkins Glen International would change from the traditional single car qualifying to group qualification sessions. The rule, carried over from the Nationwide Series road races, is anticipated to speed up the qualifying process. The field that is entered for the event will be divided into qualifying groups based on times from final practice. The amount of time that each group has on track is at the discretion of the series director. The session will begin with the first car taking the green flag at the start/finish line, and a drivers fastest lap will be the one used to determine their starting position.

Controversy arose after the Federated Auto Parts 400, in which Carl Edwards beat leader Paul Menard to the start/finish line and subsequently won. On September 15, NASCAR announced that starting with the race at Chicagoland, the second place driver will be allowed to cross the line first on restarts.

Other rules changes were:

- The hood and rear deck lid of the car are now carbon fiber material.
- Deck lids will have a 53-inch wide spoiler that sits four inches high at a 70-degree angle.
- The car now has a fabricated clear polycarbonate rear deck fin that runs down the left side of the back window to the spoiler.
- The minimum weight of the car has been reduced by 150 lb. to 3,300, 60 from the left side to 1670 and 90 from the right to 1630.

== Schedule ==
The final calendar was released on September 25, 2012, containing 36 races, with the addition of two exhibition races. The schedule also includes two Budweiser Duels, which are the qualifying races for the Daytona 500.

No.	Race title	Track	Date	Time (ET)
	Sprint Unlimited	Daytona International Speedway, Daytona Beach	February 16	8:00 PM
	Budweiser Duels	Daytona International Speedway, Daytona Beach	February 21	2:00 PM
1	Daytona 500	Daytona International Speedway, Daytona Beach	February 24	1:00 PM
2	Subway Fresh Fit 500	Phoenix International Raceway, Avondale	March 3	3:00 PM
3	Kobalt Tools 400	Las Vegas Motor Speedway, Las Vegas	March 10	3:00 PM
4	Food City 500	Bristol Motor Speedway, Bristol	March 17	1:00 PM
5	Auto Club 400	Auto Club Speedway, Fontana	March 24	3:00 PM
6	STP Gas Booster 500	Martinsville Speedway, Ridgeway	April 7	1:00 PM
7	NRA 500	Texas Motor Speedway, Fort Worth	April 13	7:30 PM
8	STP 400	Kansas Speedway, Kansas City	April 21	1:00 PM
9	Toyota Owners 400	Richmond International Raceway, Richmond	April 27	7:30 PM
10	Aaron's 499	Talladega Superspeedway, Talladega	May 5	1:00 PM
11	Bojangles' Southern 500	Darlington Raceway, Darlington	May 11	6:45 PM
	Sprint Showdown	Charlotte Motor Speedway, Concord	May 18	7:00 PM
	NASCAR Sprint All-Star Race	Charlotte Motor Speedway, Concord	May 18	9:00 PM
12	Coca-Cola 600	Charlotte Motor Speedway, Concord	May 26	6:00 PM
13	FedEx 400	Dover International Speedway, Dover	June 2	1:00 PM
14	Party in the Poconos 400	Pocono Raceway, Long Pond	June 9	1:00 PM
15	Quicken Loans 400	Michigan International Speedway, Brooklyn	June 16	1:00 PM
16	Toyota/Save Mart 350	Sonoma Raceway, Sonoma	June 23	3:00 PM
17	Quaker State 400	Kentucky Speedway, Sparta	June 30^{1}	12:00 PM
18	Coke Zero 400	Daytona International Speedway, Daytona Beach	July 6	7:30 PM
19	Camping World RV Sales 301	New Hampshire Motor Speedway, Loudon	July 14	1:00 PM
20	Crown Royal 400	Indianapolis Motor Speedway, Speedway	July 28	1:00 PM
21	Gobowling.com 400	Pocono Raceway, Long Pond	August 4	1:00 PM
22	Cheez-It 355 at The Glen	Watkins Glen International, Watkins Glen	August 11	1:00 PM
23	Pure Michigan 400	Michigan International Speedway, Brooklyn	August 18	1:00 PM
24	Irwin Tools Night Race	Bristol Motor Speedway, Bristol	August 24	7:30 PM
25	AdvoCare 500	Atlanta Motor Speedway, Hampton	September 1	7:30 PM
26	Federated Auto Parts 400	Richmond International Raceway, Richmond	September 7	7:30 PM
Chase for the Sprint Cup
27	GEICO 400	Chicagoland Speedway, Joliet	September 15	2:00 PM
28	Sylvania 300	New Hampshire Motor Speedway, Loudon	September 22	2:00 PM
29	AAA 400	Dover International Speedway, Dover	September 29	2:00 PM
30	Hollywood Casino 400	Kansas Speedway, Kansas City	October 6	2:00 PM
31	Bank of America 500	Charlotte Motor Speedway, Concord	October 12	7:30 PM
32	Camping World RV Sales 500	Talladega Superspeedway, Talladega	October 20	2:00 PM
33	Goody's Headache Relief Shot 500	Martinsville Speedway, Ridgeway	October 27	1:30 PM
34	AAA Texas 500	Texas Motor Speedway, Fort Worth	November 3	3:00 PM
35	AdvoCare 500	Phoenix International Raceway, Avondale	November 10	3:00 PM
36	Ford EcoBoost 400	Homestead-Miami Speedway, Homestead	November 17	3:00 PM

^1: Race was postponed a day because of persistent rain.

=== Schedule changes ===
The 2013 schedule differentiated slightly from the 2012 season. The fall Chase races at Kansas Speedway and Talladega Superspeedway (Hollywood Casino 400 and the Camping World RV Sales 500) returned to their original positions on the schedule because of the completion of Kansas Speedway's reconfiguring project. That was the only change on the whole schedule.

== Season summary ==
=== Regular season ===
==== Speedweeks 2013 ====
The 2013 season began on February 16, 2013, at Daytona International Speedway with Kevin Harvick winning the 2013 Sprint Unlimited in his final season with Richard Childress Racing. Five days later, Harvick recorded another victory at Daytona International Speedway in the first qualifying race of the Daytona 500, while Kyle Busch was victorious in the second qualifying race.

Top ten results (Sprint Unlimited):

1. #29 - Kevin Harvick
2. #16 - Greg Biffle
3. #22 - Joey Logano
4. #14 - Tony Stewart
5. #20 - Matt Kenseth
6. #43 - Aric Almirola
7. #5 - Kasey Kahne
8. #88 - Dale Earnhardt Jr.
9. #56 - Martin Truex Jr.
10. #42 - Juan Pablo Montoya

Top ten results (Duel 1):

1. #29 - Kevin Harvick
2. #16 - Greg Biffle
3. #42 - Juan Pablo Montoya
4. #48 - Jimmie Johnson
5. #78 - Kurt Busch
6. #14 - Tony Stewart
7. #2 - Brad Keselowski
8. #13 - Casey Mears
9. #88 - Dale Earnhardt Jr.
10. #22 - Joey Logano

Top ten results (Duel 2):

1. #18 - Kyle Busch
2. #5 - Kasey Kahne
3. #33 - Austin Dillon
4. #15 - Clint Bowyer
5. #20 - Matt Kenseth
6. #55 - Mark Martin
7. #27 - Paul Menard
8. #31 - Jeff Burton
9. #1 - Jamie McMurray
10. #34 - David Ragan

==== Round 1: Daytona 500 ====
Following the Duels, the points paying season began with the 55th Daytona 500. Matt Kenseth, hoping to take home his second consecutive 500 win, dominated the race but was taken out of contention by an engine failure. Jimmie Johnson, making his 400th start, held off late challenges from teammate Dale Earnhardt Jr. and Mark Martin to take his second Daytona 500 win.

Top ten results:

1. #48 - Jimmie Johnson
2. #88 - Dale Earnhardt Jr.
3. #55 - Mark Martin
4. #2 - Brad Keselowski
5. #39 - Ryan Newman
6. #16 - Greg Biffle
7. #51 - Regan Smith
8. #10 - Danica Patrick
9. #98 - Michael McDowell
10. #36 - J. J. Yeley

==== Round 2: Subway Fresh Fit 500 ====
The series then headed west to Phoenix International Raceway. There, Carl Edwards recovered from a disastrous Speedweeks by dominating the race, holding off the competition on fuel mileage to take his first win since 2011.

Top ten results:

1. #99 - Carl Edwards
2. #48 - Jimmie Johnson
3. #11 - Denny Hamlin
4. #2 - Brad Keselowski
5. #88 - Dale Earnhardt Jr.
6. #15 - Clint Bowyer
7. #20 - Matt Kenseth
8. #14 - Tony Stewart
9. #24 - Jeff Gordon
10. #31 - Jeff Burton

==== Round 3: Kobalt Tools 400 ====
At Las Vegas Motor Speedway, the race was dominated by Kasey Kahne, who led 114 laps. However, new Joe Gibbs Racing driver Matt Kenseth took no tires during the final round of pit stops, handing him the lead, and managed to hold off a hard-charging Kahne to take his first win with JGR as well as becoming the third birthday winner in NASCAR history.

Top ten results:

1. #20 - Matt Kenseth
2. #5 - Kasey Kahne
3. #2 - Brad Keselowski
4. #18 - Kyle Busch
5. #99 - Carl Edwards
6. #48 - Jimmie Johnson
7. #88 - Dale Earnhardt Jr.
8. #56 - Martin Truex Jr.
9. #29 - Kevin Harvick
10. #27 - Paul Menard

==== Round 4: Food City 500 ====
The fourth race of the season was held at Bristol Motor Speedway and was largely dominated by Jeff Gordon and Matt Kenseth. However, on lap 390 Gordon's right front tire blew, sending him into Kenseth's path and knocking both of them out of the race. Denny Hamlin then led a fair portion of the race, seeking JGR's second consecutive win. However, after Hamlin and Joey Logano collided late, Kasey Kahne held off Kurt Busch, Kyle Busch, and Brad Keselowski to grab his first win of the season. This race marked the beginning of animosity between Hamlin and Logano.

Top ten results:

1. #5 - Kasey Kahne
2. #18 - Kyle Busch
3. #2 - Brad Keselowski
4. #78 - Kurt Busch
5. #15 - Clint Bowyer
6. #88 - Dale Earnhardt Jr.
7. #39 - Ryan Newman
8. #55 - Brian Vickers
9. #27 - Paul Menard
10. #1 - Jamie McMurray

==== Round 5: Auto Club 400 ====
Returning west to race at Auto Club Speedway, Kyle Busch dominated the race, leading 125 laps. However, his ex-teammate Joey Logano pulled a bump and run on Denny Hamlin with 6 laps to go, but the two wrecked each other on the final lap, allowing Busch to sneak through and capture his first win of the season. Hamlin suffered a compression fracture in his back, which kept him out of action until Talladega.

Top ten results:

1. #18 - Kyle Busch
2. #88 - Dale Earnhardt Jr.
3. #22 - Joey Logano
4. #99 - Carl Edwards
5. #78 - Kurt Busch
6. #16 - Greg Biffle
7. #20 - Matt Kenseth
8. #27 - Paul Menard
9. #5 - Kasey Kahne
10. #39 - Ryan Newman

==== Round 6: STP Gas Booster 500 ====
At Martinsville Speedway, the race was a battle between Jimmie Johnson and JGR teammates Kyle Busch and Matt Kenseth. Johnson eventually dominated the weekend, leading 346 laps from pole and scoring his record 8th win at Martinsville.

Top ten results:

1. #48 - Jimmie Johnson
2. #15 - Clint Bowyer
3. #24 - Jeff Gordon
4. #5 - Kasey Kahne
5. #18 - Kyle Busch
6. #2 - Brad Keselowski
7. #1 - Jamie McMurray
8. #9 - Marcos Ambrose
9. #16 - Greg Biffle
10. #11 - Mark Martin

==== Round 7: NRA 500 ====
The Cup Series then rolled into Texas Motor Speedway to return to the intermediate tracks. The night race was split between Martin Truex Jr. and Nationwide winner Kyle Busch. The two led for a combined 313 laps, but Busch beat Truex Jr. during the final round of pit stops on lap 315 to pull off his second weekend sweep of the season.

Top ten results:

1. #18 - Kyle Busch
2. #56 - Martin Truex Jr.
3. #99 - Carl Edwards
4. #16 - Greg Biffle
5. #22 - Joey Logano
6. #48 - Jimmie Johnson
7. #43 - Aric Almirola
8. #11 - Brian Vickers
9. #2 - Brad Keselowski
10. #39 - Ryan Newman

==== Round 8: STP 400 ====
The Cup Series then headed to the repaved Kansas Speedway. 2012 Fall winner and polesitter Matt Kenseth dominated the race, leading 163 laps and holding off another furious charge from Kasey Kahne to take his second win of the season.

Top ten results:

1. #20 - Matt Kenseth
2. #5 - Kasey Kahne
3. #48 - Jimmie Johnson
4. #56 - Martin Truex Jr.
5. #15 - Clint Bowyer
6. #2 - Brad Keselowski
7. #1 - Jamie McMurray
8. #43 - Aric Almirola
9. #55 - Brian Vickers
10. #27 - Paul Menard

==== Round 9: Toyota Owners 400 ====
Following Kansas, the series returned to the short tracks in the form of Richmond International Raceway. Though polesitter Matt Kenseth dominated the race, leading 140 laps, fellow Toyota drivers Clint Bowyer and Kyle Busch also took their turns up front. Kenseth faded over the race, and Busch was swept up in a near lane violation followed by a crash. After a crash on lap 325 involving Tony Stewart, Juan Pablo Montoya stayed out and led the next 67 laps. It seemed as though Montoya would get his first win on an oval track, but a crash by Brian Vickers on lap 394 set up a green-white-checker finish, sending most of the field down pit road. Jeff Burton and others stayed out during the round of pit stops, but Burton's teammate Kevin Harvick used his fresher tires to take the race lead and drive to his first win of the season.

Top ten results:

1. #29 - Kevin Harvick
2. #15 - Clint Bowyer
3. #22 - Joey Logano
4. #42 - Juan Pablo Montoya
5. #31 - Jeff Burton
6. #99 - Carl Edwards
7. #20 - Matt Kenseth
8. #43 - Aric Almirola
9. #78 - Kurt Busch
10. #88 - Dale Earnhardt Jr.

==== Round 10: Aaron's 499 ====
In the tenth race of the season at Talladega Superspeedway, Matt Kenseth again dominated the race, leading over 140 laps. On lap 42, Kyle Busch and Kasey Kahne triggered a 16-car crash. Earlier in the race, on lap 23, Denny Hamlin, making his return from the injury he suffered in the Auto Club 400, switched out with Brian Vickers. Matt Kenseth led much of the first 110 laps, though Jimmie Johnson and Ford drivers Ricky Stenhouse Jr., polesitter Carl Edwards, Joey Logano and Brad Keselowski subsequently passed him. The Ford drivers then teamed up to pass Johnson, and before the yellow flag flew for rain, Edwards was able to pass Stenhouse. Three laps later, the red flag was flown. The rain delayed the race for 3 hours, 36 minutes. The race eventually restarted and continued to be led by Kenseth. Johnson took over after green-flag pit stops with 20 to go. The caution then came out and bunched the field up. With six laps left in the race and darkness arriving, Stenhouse and J. J. Yeley made contact, sending Yeley down the track into Kurt Busch, who flipped and landed on top of Ryan Newman's car, causing a green-white-checker finish. 14 cars in all were involved in the crash. Newman later criticized NASCAR for continuing the race even with darkness reaching the track so quickly. During the two-lap shootout, Front Row Motorsports teammates David Ragan and David Gilliland surged ahead of Kenseth, Johnson, and Edwards to finish in the top two, with Ragan securing his second career Sprint Cup victory and the first for Front Row Motorsports.

Top ten results:

1. #34 - David Ragan
2. #38 - David Gilliland
3. #99 - Carl Edwards
4. #55 - Michael Waltrip
5. #48 - Jimmie Johnson
6. #51 - Regan Smith
7. #56 - Martin Truex Jr.
8. #20 - Matt Kenseth
9. #95 - Scott Speed
10. #43 - Aric Almirola

==== Round 11: Bojangles' Southern 500 ====
At Darlington Raceway, Kyle Busch dominated much of the race, but a deflating tire proved to be his undoing, as teammate Matt Kenseth passed Busch with 13 laps left. Busch quickly fell to sixth, while Kenseth won his first career Sprint Cup race at Darlington with interim crew chief Wally Brown, who was filling in for Jason Ratcliff. Denny Hamlin, in his first full race since the Auto Club 400, finished second, while Jeff Gordon, racing in his 700th Sprint Cup start, finished 3rd.

Top ten results:

1. #20 - Matt Kenseth
2. #11 - Denny Hamlin
3. #24 - Jeff Gordon
4. #48 - Jimmie Johnson
5. #29 - Kevin Harvick
6. #18 - Kyle Busch
7. #99 - Carl Edwards
8. #42 - Juan Pablo Montoya
9. #88 - Dale Earnhardt Jr.
10. #39 - Ryan Newman

==== Exhibition: NASCAR Sprint All-Star Race ====
The second exhibition race of the season took place on May 18 at Charlotte Motor Speedway. In the Sprint Showdown (the race to determine the two drivers, and another that wins a fan vote, that will advance to the All-Star Race), Martin Truex Jr. qualified on the pole but was passed by Jamie McMurray on the first lap. McMurray led all 40 laps, win both 20-lap segments, and advanced into the All-Star Race. Ricky Stenhouse Jr. finished second to advance as well. Danica Patrick won the fan vote to advance after a 9th-place finish in the Showdown.

Top ten results (Showdown):

1. #1 - Jamie McMurray
2. #17 - Ricky Stenhouse Jr.
3. #31 - Jeff Burton
4. #27 - Paul Menard
5. #56 - Martin Truex Jr.
6. #42 - Juan Pablo Montoya
7. #43 - Aric Almirola
8. #93 - Travis Kvapil
9. #10 - Danica Patrick
10. #13 - Casey Mears

In the All-Star Race, Carl Edwards started on pole, but was quickly passed by Kurt Busch. Busch dominated the first 20-lap segment, which was interrupted by a caution for rain on lap seven and an ensuing red flag on lap 13 that lasted 41 minutes. Kyle Busch dominated segments two and three, before Kurt Busch once again found himself in the lead at the end of the fourth 20-lap segment. Due to a new stipulation, the field was re-ordered before the mandatory pit stop at the end of segment four. The drivers were ordered by their average finish in the first four segments. Kurt Busch, Kyle Busch, Kasey Kahne, Jimmie Johnson, and Joey Logano were the first five down pit road. Kahne's pit crew got him out first, followed by Johnson, Kyle Busch, Logano, and Kurt Busch. In the ensuing ten lap dash (segment five), Johnson and Kahne ran side-by-side for two laps before Johnson pulled away to take his second All-Star Race in a row (his record fourth win overall). He was followed by Logano, Kyle Busch, Kahne, and Kurt Busch.

Top ten results:

1. #48 - Jimmie Johnson
2. #22 - Joey Logano
3. #18 - Kyle Busch
4. #5 - Kasey Kahne
5. #78 - Kurt Busch
6. #11 - Denny Hamlin
7. #88 - Dale Earnhardt Jr.
8. #1 - Jamie McMurray
9. #20 - Matt Kenseth
10. #99 - Carl Edwards

==== Round 12: Coca-Cola 600 ====
At Charlotte Motor Speedway, the race was dominated by Kasey Kahne, Matt Kenseth and Kyle Busch. Denny Hamlin started on pole but was quickly passed for the lead by Kenseth. In a strange turn of events, the third caution came out on lap 122 for debris as a result of a cable that suspended a FOX Sports television camera over the frontstretch of the track snapping and falling on the track. Several cars ran over the cable, but only two sustained major damage: Kyle Busch and Marcos Ambrose. The red flag then came out on lap 126 as track officials cleaned up the cables. After a delay of 10 minutes, 40 seconds, NASCAR brought the cars down pit road and gave each team 15 minutes to look over their cars and do repairs if needed. Ten spectators received minor injuries as a result of the cable failure. Busch fell out of contention due to engine failure. Kenseth was hit from behind by Juan Pablo Montoya when he tried slow up due to a spin out by Jimmie Johnson. Kahne appeared to be headed towards back-to-back 600 victories, but a caution on lap 385 forced Kahne to stay out on old tires. 2011 Coke 600 winner Kevin Harvick, who took two tires, drove past Kahne on the restart to claim his second win of the season.

Top ten results:

1. #29 - Kevin Harvick
2. #5 - Kasey Kahne
3. #78 - Kurt Busch
4. #11 - Denny Hamlin
5. #22 - Joey Logano
6. #39 - Ryan Newman
7. #14 - Tony Stewart
8. #15 - Clint Bowyer
9. #56 - Martin Truex Jr.
10. #9 - Marcos Ambrose

==== Round 13: FedEx 400 ====
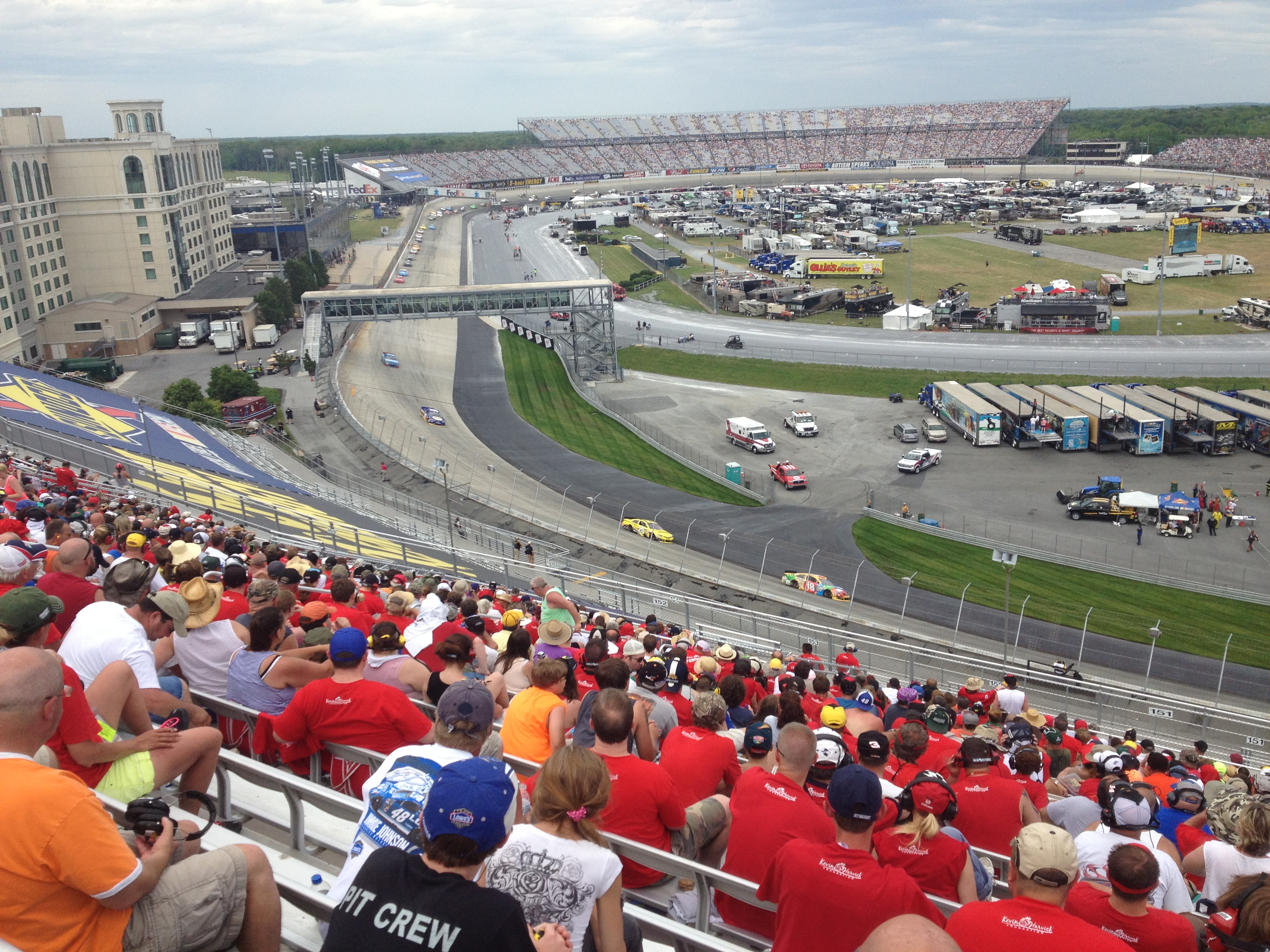
Kyle Busch leads the FedEx 400 ahead of Matt Kenseth through the third turn.

At Dover International Speedway, car owner Joe Gibbs had his 3 cars starting in 3 of the top 4 spots. Denny Hamlin won the pole, Kyle Busch and Matt Kenseth started third through fourth. Martin Truex Jr. started 2nd. Kyle Busch later took the lead and nearly put points leader Jimmie Johnson one lap down until green-flag pit stops allowed Johnson to stay on the lead lap. During a caution, Matt Kenseth beat Busch off pit road to take the lead. Kenseth led the next 29 laps when his engine failed, giving Busch the lead again. Kenseth finished 40th. Busch led the most with 150. Johnson came on strong in the second half of the race, leading 143 laps. Just under 100 laps after Kenseth's engine blew, Truex Jr.'s engine also blew. After pit stops due to a late caution, Juan Pablo Montoya was in the lead with Johnson in second. Stewart took only two tires on the final pit stop for track position. At the restart with 19 laps remaining, Johnson jumped the gun and was penalized. Johnson protested over the radio that he didn't deserve the penalty and stayed on the track asking for a review. Johnson finally followed the order to head to the pits and serve a pass-through penalty. Johnson finished 17th. Stewart, aided by Johnson's miscalculation, Kasey Kahne's Turn 1 mistake and a fading Kyle Busch, caught a loose Montoya, passing him with three laps left. Stewart remained in the lead, winning his first race of the season.

Top ten results:

1. #14 - Tony Stewart
2. #42 - Juan Pablo Montoya
3. #24 - Jeff Gordon
4. #18 - Kyle Busch
5. #2 - Brad Keselowski
6. #15 - Clint Bowyer
7. #22 - Joey Logano
8. #29 - Kevin Harvick
9. #55 - Mark Martin
10. #88 - Dale Earnhardt Jr.

==== Round 14: Party in the Poconos 400 ====
Jimmie Johnson was rewarded the pole after qualifying was rained out. After Carl Edwards led the first nine laps, Johnson took the lead and dominated the race, leading 128 of 160 laps, to win his third race of the season. Greg Biffle, Dale Earnhardt Jr., Tony Stewart, and Ryan Newman rounded out the top-five.

Top ten results:

1. #48 - Jimmie Johnson
2. #16 - Greg Biffle
3. #88 - Dale Earnhardt Jr.
4. #14 - Tony Stewart
5. #39 - Ryan Newman
6. #18 - Kyle Busch
7. #78 - Kurt Busch
8. #11 - Denny Hamlin
9. #29 - Kevin Harvick
10. #22 - Joey Logano

==== Round 15: Quicken Loans 400 ====
The race began with Busch colliding with pole-sitter Edwards in an attempt to grab the lead in the first turn. While Edwards lost multiple positions, Kurt Busch came out on top. Shortly after, the caution flag flew after Bobby Labonte got loose and spun into Gordon. After a lap 20 competition caution for the previous night's rain, Kurt Busch got loose off of turn two and crashed down the back-straightaway.

Afterward, multiple caution flags and different pit stop strategies gave Joey Logano, Jamie McMurray, Jimmie Johnson, Dale Earnhardt Jr., and Kasey Kahne turns at leading the race. Johnson rebounded to the second position after falling to twelfth as a result of a restart mistake, and leader Kahne blew a right-front tire and hit the wall in turn one on lap 105. Johnson took over the lead but lost it to Earnhardt during pit stops. On the restart, Earnhardt pulled away from Matt Kenseth and Greg Biffle as Johnson struggled to battle back to the lead. Several laps later, Earnhardt developed engine problems and started to fall back, giving Johnson the lead (after he had passed Kenseth and Biffle). After a few slow laps, Earnhardt's engine blew up, bringing out yet another caution. After taking four tires in the pits, Johnson fell to 20th and Edwards took the lead ahead of Logano, Kenseth, and Biffle. Biffle then closed in on Edwards and passed him for the lead on lap 150, quickly pulling away. A caution for McMurray's blown right-front tire came in the middle of the last round of pit stops, trapping Edwards a lap down (he got the free pass). Biffle, who had pitted under the green but did not go a lap down, cycled out as the leader. On the restart at lap 174, Kenseth got loose off of turn two and dropped several positions while Johnson, who restarted 10th, tried to pick up positions. Johnson gradually came through the field, passing Kevin Harvick to move into second with eight laps to go. However, as Johnson struggled to catch Biffle, he blew a right-front tire out of turn two on lap 198. Biffle sped away to win over Harvick, Martin Truex Jr., Kyle Busch, and Tony Stewart. Biffle's victory was the 1,000th for the Ford Motor Company in NASCAR's top 3 series.

Top ten results:

1. #16 - Greg Biffle
2. #29 - Kevin Harvick
3. #56 - Martin Truex Jr.
4. #18 - Kyle Busch
5. #14 - Tony Stewart
6. #20 - Matt Kenseth
7. #15 - Clint Bowyer
8. #99 - Carl Edwards
9. #22 - Joey Logano
10. #31 - Jeff Burton

==== Round 16: Toyota/Save Mart 350 ====
Jamie McMurray started on the pole, but Kurt Busch was able to get the lead early. However, Busch suffered back-to-back speeding penalties, sending him to the back of the field. Danica Patrick became the first woman to race a road course in the Sprint Cup Series; she spun midway through the race in turn seven and finished 29th. Denny Hamlin and Kyle Busch both struggled, going off track numerous times. Martin Truex Jr. led 51 laps on his way to his first win in 218 races, setting a NASCAR record for most races between wins. Juan Pablo Montoya was running second on the white flag lap before running out of gas, relegating him to a 34th-place finish. Truex was followed by Jeff Gordon and Carl Edwards, with Kurt Busch and defending race winner Clint Bowyer rounding out the top five.

Top ten results:

1. #56 - Martin Truex Jr.
2. #24 - Jeff Gordon
3. #99 - Carl Edwards
4. #78 - Kurt Busch
5. #15 - Clint Bowyer
6. #5 - Kasey Kahne
7. #9 - Marcos Ambrose
8. #16 - Greg Biffle
9. #48 - Jimmie Johnson
10. #29 - Kevin Harvick

==== Round 17: Quaker State 400 ====
Dale Earnhardt Jr. started on pole, but Carl Edwards led the first 30 laps. After a lap 30 competition caution and a second caution on lap 43 for a Kyle Busch spin, Earnhardt assumed the lead until Jimmie Johnson passed him on the lap 46 restart. Johnson went on to dominate the race, leading 182 of the 267 laps. Two laps after the restart, Kurt Busch spun Brad Keselowski going into turn one, causing Keselowski to slide back up the track, where he collected Greg Biffle, Dave Blaney, and Travis Kvapil. The crash caused a red flag so the track could be cleaned.

Once back to green on lap 52, Johnson held the lead over second-place Matt Kenseth until a restart on lap 94, when Kenseth moved into the lead and Kyle Busch passed Johnson for second. Kenseth led until the next caution (a debris caution on lap 109), when he came to pit road after running over the debris. Johnson, who stayed out, reassumed the lead and held it until lap 149, when he was beat off of pit road by Edwards following a caution for a Denny Hamlin tire failure. Hamlin hit the wall where there was no SAFER barrier and had a lengthy stay in the infield care center; however, he was not injured.

Johnson retook the lead shortly after the lap 154 restart and held the lead until lap 244 when he was beaten off of pit road by Kenseth, who didn't take any tires following a caution for Brian Vickers' collision with the wall. On the restart, Kenseth restarted on the outside and pulled away as Johnson spun his tires. Joey Logano tried to make it three-wide in turn one. This partly resulted in Johnson's car losing control and spinning onto the track apron. Johnson made a pit stop and restarted 25th on lap 251. However, Kenseth continued to lead, and he picked up his fourth win of 2013, ahead of Jamie McMurray, Clint Bowyer, Logano, and Kurt Busch. Johnson battled back to finish ninth after his spin.

Top ten results:

1. #20 - Matt Kenseth
2. #1 - Jamie McMurray
3. #15 - Clint Bowyer
4. #22 - Joey Logano
5. #18 - Kyle Busch
6. #78 - Kurt Busch
7. #56 - Martin Truex Jr.
8. #24 - Jeff Gordon
9. #48 - Jimmie Johnson
10. #29 - Kevin Harvick

==== Round 18: Coke Zero 400 ====
Kyle Busch started on pole and led 30 of the first 33 laps. Jimmie Johnson then took the lead and dominated, leading 94 of 161 laps (a green-white-checker lengthened the race by one lap). Jamie McMurray led 10 laps just past the halfway point after Johnson restarted in the middle of the pack, but no one was actually able to take the lead from Johnson. A series of crashes occurred in the second half of the race, two of which involved four cars each and another which had six cars involved. The drivers in these crashes were: Martin Truex Jr., Juan Pablo Montoya, Kyle Busch, Aric Almirola, Greg Biffle, Jeff Gordon, Matt Kenseth, David Reutimann, Dave Blaney, David Stremme, Denny Hamlin, and A. J. Allmendinger. Hamlin and Allmendinger were both involved in two of the crashes, including the third (and largest) crash in which Hamlin lost control and hit the wall, and was then hit hard by Allmendinger.

A caution waved with four to go after Kasey Kahne and Marcos Ambrose (who were second and third at the time) tangled and Kahne hit the inside wall. This set up a green-white-checker finish attempt in which Johnson and Tony Stewart were able to get in front of Kevin Harvick and Clint Bowyer. Two large crashes occurred on the last lap; the first saw Carl Edwards got turned in turn one, collecting Ambrose, Bobby Labonte, Scott Speed, and others. In the tri-oval, Danica Patrick cut down in front of David Gilliland and was turned into Ricky Stenhouse Jr. and Ryan Newman, causing a crash that also involved Kyle Busch, Casey Mears, and Jeff Burton, among others.

Johnson held off Stewart, Harvick, and Bowyer to win his fourth race of the season. Michael Waltrip rounded out the top five. Johnson became the first driver since Bobby Allison in 1982 to win both Daytona races in the same year.

Top ten results:

1. #48 - Jimmie Johnson
2. #14 - Tony Stewart
3. #29 - Kevin Harvick
4. #15 - Clint Bowyer
5. #55 - Brian Vickers
6. #78 - Kurt Busch
7. #1 - Jamie McMurray
8. #88 - Dale Earnhardt Jr.
9. #13 - Casey Mears
10. #39 - Ryan Newman

==== Round 19: Camping World RV Sales 301 ====
The second half of the season started with Brad Keselowski clinching the pole. Jimmie Johnson (who qualified second) was sent to the rear of the field for failing post-qualifying inspection. Keselowski led the first few laps, but relinquished the lead to Kyle Busch, who, in turn, lost it to Kurt Busch. As drivers came into and fell out of the top ten due to pit strategy, both Kurt and Kyle Busch, Matt Kenseth, Tony Stewart, and others took turns at the front.

Stewart led the majority of the last 100 laps, but Brian Vickers passed both Stewart and Kyle Busch with about 15 laps left. The race saw an unusually high amount of cautions, with the 12th of the day coming out with four to go to set up a green-white-checker finish. On the restart, Vickers held the lead over Stewart and Busch, but coming to the white flag, Stewart ran out of fuel. This allowed Vickers to take his third career win over Kyle Busch, Jeff Burton, Keselowski, and Aric Almirola.

Top ten results:

1. #55 - Brian Vickers
2. #18 - Kyle Busch
3. #31 - Jeff Burton
4. #2 - Brad Keselowski
5. #43 - Aric Almirola
6. #48 - Jimmie Johnson
7. #29 - Kevin Harvick
8. #99 - Carl Edwards
9. #20 - Matt Kenseth
10. #24 - Jeff Gordon

==== Round 20: Crown Royal Presents The Samuel Deeds 400 at The Brickyard ====
Ryan Newman started on pole after setting a new track-record in the process. This was Newman's 50th career pole. Newman led the first 29 laps, but Jimmie Johnson took over after a round of green-flag pit stops. Johnson led 74 laps, more than anyone else, swapping the lead several times with Newman and other drivers due to pit strategy. Three caution periods slowed the race, two for Timmy Hill's car slowing due to fuel pump problems and the other for Jeff Burton's slowing car. After a slow last green flag pit stop, Johnson fell 10 seconds behind Newman, who took only two tires during his last green flag pit stop. With 16 laps remaining the 1–2 leaders of Denny Hamlin and Kevin Harvick had to pit, giving the lead back to Newman who was now 7 seconds ahead of Johnson. Newman led the last 16 laps to win his first race since the 2012 Goody's Fast Relief 500. Newman became the 2nd driver in NASCAR history to win from his 50th career pole. Jeff Gordon accomplished this feat in the Pepsi 400 at Daytona in 2004. Johnson finished second, followed by Kasey Kahne, Tony Stewart, and Matt Kenseth.

Top ten results:

1. #39 - Ryan Newman
2. #48 - Jimmie Johnson
3. #5 - Kasey Kahne
4. #14 - Tony Stewart
5. #20 - Matt Kenseth
6. #88 - Dale Earnhardt Jr.
7. #24 - Jeff Gordon
8. #22 - Joey Logano
9. #42 - Juan Pablo Montoya
10. #18 - Kyle Busch

==== Round 21: Gobowling.com 400 ====
Jimmie Johnson started on pole and led 43 laps early, with Kyle Busch, Kurt Busch, and others exchanging spots in the top five. The first caution was displayed in turn one on lap one after Juan Pablo Montoya got loose and slid up the track, collecting, most notably, Ricky Stenhouse Jr. and Matt Kenseth. Denny Hamlin's day was ended early, after he hit the wall on lap 14 and went out of the race, finishing in the 43rd position. Just before halfway, Johnson blew a tire and hit the wall, bringing out the caution. He spent much of the remaining race around 25th, and rallied in the late stages to finish 13th. Kasey Kahne dominated the race after that, and swapped the lead with Jeff Gordon twice on the last two restarts to take his second win of the year. Gordon, Kurt Busch, Ryan Newman, and Dale Earnhardt Jr. rounded out the top five.

Top ten results:

1. #5 - Kasey Kahne
2. #24 - Jeff Gordon
3. #78 - Kurt Busch
4. #39 - Ryan Newman
5. #88 - Dale Earnhardt Jr.
6. #2 - Brad Keselowski
7. #22 - Joey Logano
8. #18 - Kyle Busch
9. #14 - Tony Stewart
10. #16 - Greg Biffle

==== Round 22: Cheez-It 355 at The Glen ====
Marcos Ambrose won the pole position and led 51 of the first 62 laps. After a caution during green flag pit stops shuffled the field, Ambrose and others frontrunners were cycled outside the top 12 and Kyle Busch took over as the leader. Busch led the majority of the rest of the race and hold off Brad Keselowski and Martin Truex Jr. to win his second career race at Watkins Glen and his third of the season. Many contenders were caught up in numerous crashes during the race, including Kasey Kahne, Jeff Gordon, Dale Earnhardt Jr., Ambrose, Matt Kenseth, Brian Vickers, Ron Fellows, Jeff Burton, Paul Menard, David Ragan, Landon Cassill, Tomy Drissi, and others. One crash involving five cars brought out a several-minute red flag to clean up oil dropped on the track.

Top ten results:

1. #18 - Kyle Busch
2. #2 - Brad Keselowski
3. #56 - Martin Truex Jr.
4. #99 - Carl Edwards
5. #42 - Juan Pablo Montoya
6. #15 - Clint Bowyer
7. #22 - Joey Logano
8. #48 - Jimmie Johnson
9. #78 - Kurt Busch
10. #47 - A. J. Allmendinger

==== Round 23: Pure Michigan 400 ====
Joey Logano took the pole position with a new track record and traded the lead with Kurt Busch early as three cautions waved in the first 15 laps. After crashing his primary car in practice, points-leader Jimmie Johnson started 41st and quickly came to the front to lead three laps during a round of pit stops. However, while running in 7th on lap 53, Johnson's engine failed and he was relegated to a 40th-place finish. Meanwhile, several different drivers took turns at the front, with Kurt Busch leading 43 laps, Greg Biffle leading 28, Dale Earnhardt Jr. taking over for 20 circuits, and Brad Keselowski leading 17 laps. Earnhardt blew a right-front tire while in 6th place midway through the race and spent several laps in the garage under repairs. Late in the race, Mark Martin stayed out to try to win the race on fuel mileage. He led 23 laps before running out of gas with four to go, dropping him to 27th. This allowed pole-sitter Logano, who led a race-high 51 laps, to take his and Penske Racing's first win of the year.

Top ten results:

1. #22 - Joey Logano
2. #29 - Kevin Harvick
3. #78 - Kurt Busch
4. #27 - Paul Menard
5. #15 - Clint Bowyer
6. #9 - Marcos Ambrose
7. #5 - Kasey Kahne
8. #31 - Jeff Burton
9. #16 - Greg Biffle
10. #99 - Carl Edwards

==== Round 24: Irwin Tools Night Race ====
Denny Hamlin took the pole and led the first 22 laps. After being passed by Kurt Busch, Hamlin fell back to mid-field. Busch led most of the laps until lap 81, when he came down pit road for a loose wheel and was given a pass-thru penalty for speeding. Carl Edwards and Dale Earnhardt Jr. shared the lead during the next two stints, before Clint Bowyer passed Earnhardt for the lead on lap 126. Bowyer led until getting spun on lap 176, causing the fourth caution. Edwards retook the lead, showing the way until being passed by Matt Kenseth on lap 236. After a lap 259 debris caution, Kenseth was caught speeding on pit road and relegated to the back, while Paul Menard stayed out to take the lead. Edwards once again claimed the lead on lap 322.

Kevin Harvick took the lead after the seventh caution on lap 335, but he was quickly passed by Edwards on lap 344. Edwards held the lead through two more cautions, but dropped a cylinder on lap 380 and blew his engine on lap 389. Kenseth held the lead through most of the final 120 laps and held off a final 10-lap charge by Kasey Kahne to score his fifth victory of the season. Juan Pablo Montoya finished third, and Brian Vickers and Joey Logano rounded out the top five. Eleven caution flags waved during the race, three of which were for debris. Drivers involved in seven, mostly minor, crashes included Ryan Truex, Josh Wise, Clint Bowyer, Tony Raines, Jimmie Johnson, David Reutimann, Aric Almirola, and Jeff Burton. The eleventh caution on lap 448, as Hamlin blew a tire and ran into Ryan Newman, causing a large crash also involving Brad Keselowski, Martin Truex Jr., Terry Labonte, and Kevin Harvick. Truex Jr. suffered a broken wrist after the accident.

Top ten results:

1. #20 - Matt Kenseth
2. #5 - Kasey Kahne
3. #42 - Juan Pablo Montoya
4. #55 - Brian Vickers
5. #22 - Joey Logano
6. #27 - Paul Menard
7. #24 - Jeff Gordon
8. #9 - Marcos Ambrose
9. #16 - Greg Biffle
10. #88 - Dale Earnhardt Jr.

==== Round 25: AdvoCare 500 ====
Ricky Stenhouse Jr. won his first pole, but quickly fell back at the start. Juan Pablo Montoya led the first 25 laps, before dropping the position to Joey Logano one lap before a scheduled competition caution. On the restart, Jeff Gordon was bumped by Matt Kenseth, causing an accordion effect that involved Kasey Kahne, Dale Earnhardt Jr., Jimmie Johnson, Jeff Burton, and Mark Martin. Some cars suffered major damage. Carl Edwards took the lead from Montoya on the restart and led until pit stops under the third caution at lap 60. Gordon took over here, holding the lead until pit stops on lap 78 (the caution having been for Paul Menard's wheel coming off and being hit by Johnson). Edwards reclaimed the lead and held it until green-flag pit stops on lap 123. Logano (who was off-sequence) took over until Clint Bowyer went by on lap 139. He pitted on lap 166, and reclaimed the position from Logano on lap 173, before blowing his engine on lap 192.

Edwards took the lead on pit road, but lost it to Logano on the restart, just before a crash involving Paul Menard and Denny Hamlin. Brad Keselowski passed Logano on lap 214 (just after the restart) and stayed in front until his engine dropped a cylinder on lap 244. After another cycle of green-flag pit stops, Logano held the lead until Jimmie Johnson spun on lap 286. Kyle Busch won the race off pit road and held the lead through two more cautions to pick up his fourth win of the season. Logano, Martin Truex Jr., Kurt Busch, and Ryan Newman rounded out the top five.

Top ten results:

1. #18 - Kyle Busch
2. #22 - Joey Logano
3. #56 - Martin Truex Jr.
4. #78 - Kurt Busch
5. #39 - Ryan Newman
6. #24 - Jeff Gordon
7. #42 - Juan Pablo Montoya
8. #88 - Dale Earnhardt Jr.
9. #29 - Kevin Harvick
10. #55 - Brian Vickers

==== Round 26: Federated Auto Parts 400 ====
The final race of the regular season was held at Richmond International Raceway. Jeff Gordon led the initial run, with Chase contenders Brad Keselowski and Kurt Busch following behind. Chase hopeful Jamie McMurray joined the battle for the lead during the early stages. When Gordon dropped back significantly, Keselowski and Busch swapped the lead in traffic. Keselowski ended up leading 142 laps on the night, but ended up 17th. Through the final 100 laps, Carl Edwards surged into the top 10 and took the lead from Busch after a round of pit stops on lap 349. Wild Card contender Ryan Newman took the lead from Edwards with 10 laps to go, needing a win to break a tie with Martin Truex Jr. A spin by Clint Bowyer with 8 laps to go forced the field onto pit road. Paul Menard and others gambled on two tires in a repeat of the April race. On the final restart, Edwards beat Menard to the line and held off Busch and Newman for his second win.

The Wild Card race ran down to the wire. The final spots came down to Joey Logano, Keselowski, Gordon, Truex Jr. and Newman. On the final round of stops, Logano took the wave-around, finishing 22nd and beating Gordon for 10th place in the Chase by a single point. Despite finishing 3rd, Newman was bounced out of the second Wild Card spot by Truex based on a tiebreak owing to the latter's 2nd-place finish at Texas.

The spin by Bowyer led to controversy as to whether or not Bowyer spun himself out intentionally to allow Truex to win the tiebreaker with Newman. While Bowyer claimed that the spin was unintentional, audio from Brian Vickers' car was uncovered, revealing that Ty Norris had Vickers unnecessarily pit on the final restart in order to help Truex into the Chase. As it turned out, this forced Newman to the back of the cycle on pit stops, ensuring he would not finish high enough to break the tie with Truex. On September 9, 2013, NASCAR docked 50 owner/driver points from all three MWR teams. As the penalty was applied before points were reset for the Chase, this had the effect of ejecting Truex from the Chase and putting Newman in his place. Bowyer's totals were not affected, as he was locked into the Chase at Bristol. While NASCAR determined Bowyer's spin was not intentional, it found that MWR had manipulated the Chase standings by having Vickers pit improperly. Norris was also suspended indefinitely.

At the same time, evidence surfaced that Logano may have gotten a spot in the Chase due to illicit help from Front Row Motorsports, which is considered a partner with Logano's team at Penske Racing; both are Ford teams with Roush Fenway powertrains. Front Row's spotter was heard asking David Gilliland to let Logano pass him on the restart following the caution triggered by Bowyer's spin. Logano finished 22nd, enough to give him the final Chase spot. Four days after the race, NASCAR placed Penske and Front Row on probation for the remainder of the season. At the same time, Chairman Brian France announced that Gordon was added to the Chase as part of an "unprecedented" step of expanding the Chase to 13 cars. According to France, NASCAR had determined that Gordon would have qualified for the Chase if not for the "unfair disadvantage" he had suffered from the actions of MWR and Penske/Front Row.

Top ten results:

1. #99 - Carl Edwards
2. #78 - Kurt Busch
3. #39 - Ryan Newman
4. #1 - Jamie McMurray
5. #27 - Paul Menard
6. #20 - Matt Kenseth
7. #56 - Martin Truex Jr.
8. #24 - Jeff Gordon
9. #14 - Mark Martin
10. #17 - Ricky Stenhouse Jr.

=== Chase for the NASCAR Sprint Cup ===
==== Round 27: GEICO 400 ====
After a rain delay of over one hour, Joey Logano started on pole and led the first 32 laps. Jimmie Johnson took the lead on lap 32 pit stops by taking only two tires after a lap 30 competition caution. Johnson led 40 laps, then came to pit road for green-flag pit stops. Johnson would have a slow pit stop, relegating him to fifth place. This gave the lead to Matt Kenseth, who led the race until a caution waved on lap 108 for rain and a spin by Cole Whitt. The rain caused a lengthy delay of just over five hours and ten minutes while the track was dried.

The race resumed at night, and Kenseth held the lead until pit stops on lap 150. During the time Kenseth was out front, Juan Pablo Montoya blew a tire (causing the third caution) and Justin Allgaier spun in his first career Sprint Cup start (bringing out the fourth caution). Joey Logano's engine lost two cylinders as well. Jeff Gordon took the lead after the lap 150 pit stops and remained out front through the fifth caution until the next cycle of pit stops during the sixth caution on lap 170. Meanwhile, Cole Whitt's car exploded in a ball of fire, and Brian Vickers' engine blew up. Greg Biffle won the race off pit road, but was passed by Kyle Busch on the lap 173 restart. Jeff Gordon pitted with a flat left-rear tire one lap later. On lap 177, Joey Logano's engine blew up, bringing out the seventh caution. Kyle Busch continued to lead, now in front of Martin Truex Jr. and Matt Kenseth, as Jimmie Johnson (who restarted 20th on lap 182) raced his way to the top three by lap 210.

Dale Earnhardt Jr. brought out the eighth caution on lap 226 by blowing his engine during a cycle of green-flag pit stops. Kyle Busch, Kenseth, and Johnson restarted as the top three, and Busch and Kenseth remained the top two until the end of the race. Justin Allgaier once again spun on lap 239, and Kenseth passed Busch on the restart. He held off Busch to win his sixth race of the year. Kevin Harvick finished third, Kurt Busch fourth, and Jimmie Johnson fifth.

Top ten results:

1. #20 - Matt Kenseth
2. #18 - Kyle Busch
3. #29 - Kevin Harvick
4. #78 - Kurt Busch
5. #48 - Jimmie Johnson
6. #24 - Jeff Gordon
7. #2 - Brad Keselowski
8. #17 - Ricky Stenhouse Jr.
9. #15 - Clint Bowyer
10. #39 - Ryan Newman

==== Round 28: Sylvania 300 ====
Ryan Newman took the pole with a new track record and led the first two laps, after which he fell back quickly. Kasey Kahne took over and led until the lap 36 restart, having retained the lead through pit stops during the first caution as a result of a spin by Josh Wise. The second caution immediately waved on lap 37 for a crash involving Jamie McMurray and Kevin Swindell. Martin Truex Jr., who took the lead from Kahne, continued to lead on the restart and led until green-flag pit stops on lap 110. Meanwhile, Bobby Labonte blew a tire on lap 53, causing the third caution. Matt Kenseth and Brad Keselowski led during the pit cycle before handing the lead to Dale Earnhardt Jr., who was off-sequence with the others and led until lap 130. Truex took over again and stayed up front until Kenseth went by on lap 153.

The fourth caution flew for a crash on lap 165, and Jeff Gordon became the leader after pit stops. Debris caused the fifth caution on lap 201, and Jimmie Johnson came off pit road first; however, Clint Bowyer and Marcos Ambrose did not pit. By lap 210, Matt Kenseth had passed everyone to take the lead once more. David Gilliland blew his engine on lap 245, and Kenseth held the lead after the lap 250 restart as well as the lap 257 restart (following a spin by Kasey Kahne to bring out the seventh caution). Kenseth held the lead over Kyle Busch, Greg Biffle, and Jimmie Johnson over the last 40 laps to win his second consecutive race, and his seventh of the year.

Top ten results:

1. #20 - Matt Kenseth
2. #18 - Kyle Busch
3. #16 - Greg Biffle
4. #48 - Jimmie Johnson
5. #1 - Jamie McMurray
6. #88 - Dale Earnhardt Jr.
7. #55 - Brian Vickers
8. #31 - Jeff Burton
9. #99 - Carl Edwards
10. #56 - Martin Truex Jr.

==== Round 29: AAA 400 ====
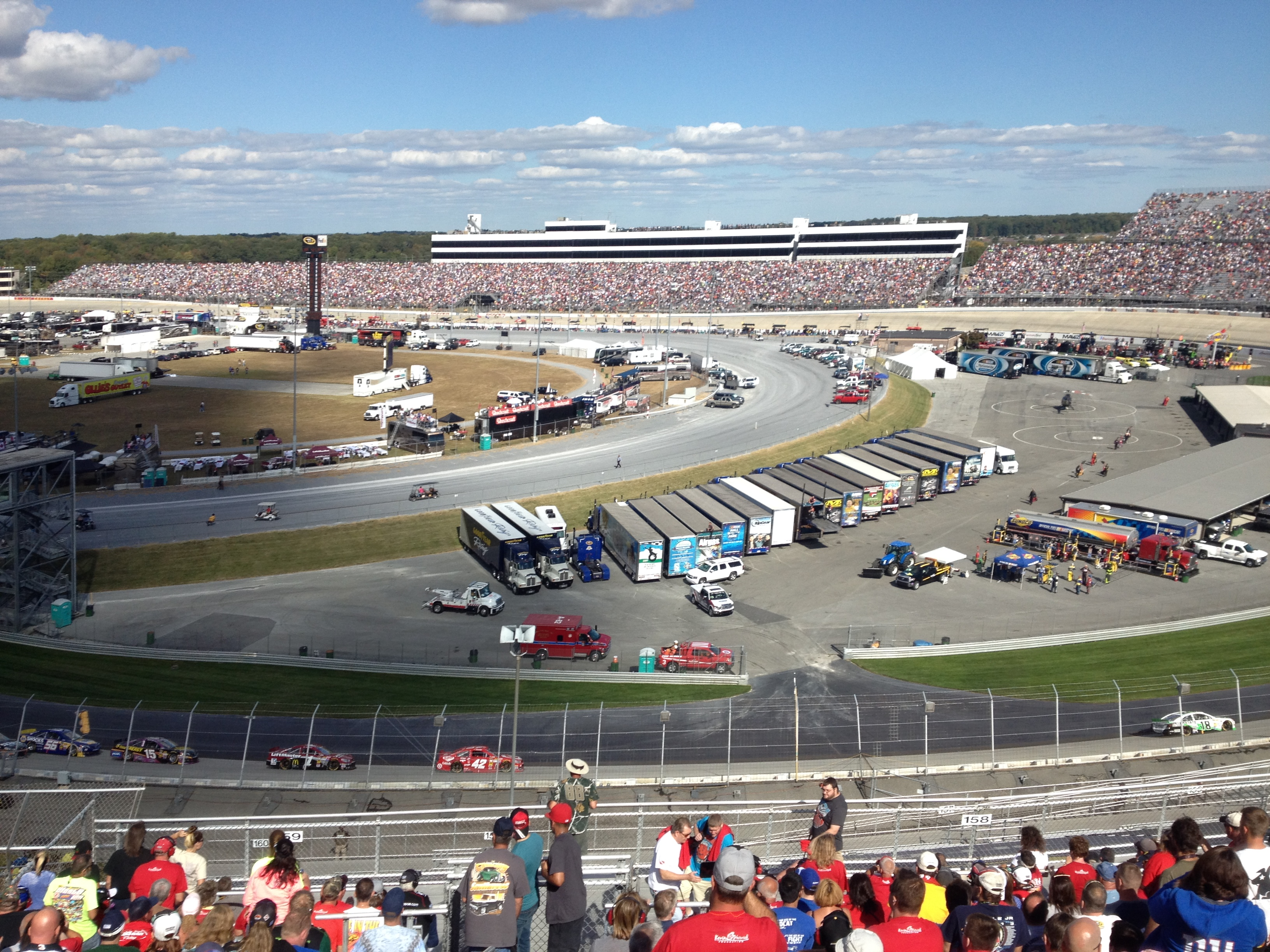
Kyle Busch leads the AAA 400 ahead of Juan Pablo Montoya through the third turn.

Dale Earnhardt Jr. won his second pole of the year and led the first 25 laps. Matt Kenseth, who started second, took over on lap 26 as a result of Earnhardt getting hung up in lap traffic. Earnhardt then retook the lead five laps later after more problems with lap traffic. The first caution waved on lap 37 for debris, and Kyle Busch came off pit road first. Busch led until Ryan Newman passed him lap 72. Earnhardt then went by Newman on lap 76 and led until missing pit road on lap 117 during green-flag pit stops. Earnhardt came out in eighth, giving the lead to Jimmie Johnson. Johnson led until pit stops under the second caution, which came out on lap 165 for debris. Matt Kenseth retook the lead from Johnson and held it until Johnson went back by on lap 198. The third caution, for fluid from Brad Keselowski's car, came out on lap 227, but Johnson held the lead off pit road. Johnson and Earnhardt pulled away on the restart as Kenseth lost a position to Kyle Busch.

By lap 298, Earnhardt had caught Johnson, but struggled to get by, finally taking the lead as Johnson made a pit stop on lap 310. After the round of stops cycled through, Johnson retained the lead, with Kenseth, Gordon, and Earnhardt (who got stuck behind a slower car) following behind. The fourth caution flag waved on lap 370 for debris in turn three, and Johnson, Gordon, and Kenseth took two tires. Earnhardt came out fourth with four fresh tires, but could only get to second on the restart. Johnson held him off to take his fifth victory of the season and his record eighth win at Dover, surpassing Richard Petty and Bobby Allison with seven wins apiece. Joey Logano finished third, followed by Jeff Gordon and Kyle Busch.

Top ten results:

1. #48 - Jimmie Johnson
2. #88 - Dale Earnhardt Jr.
3. #22 - Joey Logano
4. #24 - Jeff Gordon
5. #18 - Kyle Busch
6. #29 - Kevin Harvick
7. #20 - Matt Kenseth
8. #39 - Ryan Newman
9. #16 - Greg Biffle
10. #15 - Clint Bowyer

==== Round 30: Hollywood Casino 400 ====
Kevin Harvick won his first pole since 2006 in a race plagued with 15 cautions for debris, crashes, and spins involving several drivers, including Kyle Busch, Ryan Newman, and Danica Patrick. While points leader Matt Kenseth struggled with a loose racecar to finish eleventh, Harvick dominated the race, leading 138 laps en route to his third win of the season. Jimmie Johnson developed an engine problem with two laps to go and limped home to finish sixth.

Top ten results:

1. #29 - Kevin Harvick
2. #78 - Kurt Busch
3. #24 - Jeff Gordon
4. #22 - Joey Logano
5. #99 - Carl Edwards
6. #48 - Jimmie Johnson
7. #27 - Paul Menard
8. #88 - Dale Earnhardt Jr.
9. #9 - Marcos Ambrose
10. #43 - Aric Almirola

==== Round 31: Bank of America 500 ====
Jeff Gordon started on pole and led the first 26 laps, losing the lead during pit stops to Kasey Kahne after Dave Blaney hit the wall to cause the first caution. All four Hendrick Motorsports cars dominated the race, leading all but 21 laps. Kahne led early, leading 138 laps in total, and Jimmie Johnson led 130 circuits himself. Dale Earnhardt Jr. led 19 laps after passing Kahne on a couple of restarts, and Jeff Gordon led the first 26 laps after starting first. Most of the laps led by other drivers, such as Kyle Busch, Matt Kenseth, Ryan Newman, Carl Edwards, Clint Bowyer, and David Gilliland, occurred during green-flag pit stops and totaled no more than Busch's total of four laps.

After the first caution at lap 25, three more caution flags waved during the race: first for Mark Martin's blown engine on lap 84, second for debris on lap 173, and last, once again for debris, on lap 308. Jimmie Johnson had taken the lead from Kahne on the lap 178 restart after the third caution and held the top point until pit stops during the last caution on lap 309, minus a few laps during a round of green-flag pit stops. Kasey Kahne and Jeff Gordon took two tires and beat Kenseth and Johnson, who took four tires, off of pit road. On the restart, Johnson got loose in turn two and dropped to seventh as Kahne tried to pull away from Kenseth and Brad Keselowski, who had quickly passed Gordon on the restart. Keselowski got by Kenseth and ran down and passed Kahne after a fierce battle with less than ten laps to go. Keselowski led the final eight laps (to total eleven led in the race) to win his first race of the year and become the first non-Chase driver to win in the Chase since, ironically, Kahne in the 2011 Kobalt Tools 500. Kahne barely held on to second, Kenseth finished third, and Johnson recovered to finish fourth. Kyle Busch, Kevin Harvick, and Jeff Gordon rounded out the top seven.

This race marked the Cup Series debut of Kyle Larson, driving the #51 Target Chevrolet for Phoenix Racing. Larson started 21st, and finished 37th.

Top ten results:

1. #2 - Brad Keselowski
2. #5 - Kasey Kahne
3. #20 - Matt Kenseth
4. #48 - Jimmie Johnson
5. #18 - Kyle Busch
6. #29 - Kevin Harvick
7. #24 - Jeff Gordon
8. #39 - Ryan Newman
9. #11 - Denny Hamlin
10. #99 - Carl Edwards

==== Round 32: Camping World RV Sales 500 ====
Qualifying was cancelled due to rain, causing the starting positions to be set by the fastest times during the first practice. Thus, Aric Almirola started from the pole. The first caution quickly waved on lap three as Tony Raines' engine expired. After the restart, numerous drivers took turns leading as Kasey Kahne lost the draft just after lap 20 and quickly fell behind. Matt Kenseth, who first took the lead on lap 12 and led six laps, retook the lead on lap 27 and led the field until pitting on lap 42. On lap 43, Kyle Busch was blocked on pit road by Jamie McMurray during green-flag pit stops and missed his pit stall, causing him to have to come down pit road again. Meanwhile, Brad Keselowski and Bobby Labonte received pass-through penalties for speeding on pit road. After pit stops, Kenseth, Jimmie Johnson, Dale Earnhardt Jr. traded the lead several times until the caution came out on lap 80 for a crash involving Marcos Ambrose and Juan Pablo Montoya. Montoya's car would be retired from the race. Johnson, Earnhardt, and Kenseth continued to do most of the leading until Kenseth's car fell back because of handling problems. Clint Bowyer and Ricky Stenhouse Jr. also took turns up front.

Kasey Kahne was caught speeding on pit road during the next round of green-flag pit stops and was given a penalty. Earnhardt cycled out into the lead and Johnson dropped to 17th. However, five laps later (lap 132), Johnson retook the lead. Earnhardt and Kyle Busch shared the lead with Johnson, as Kenseth once again dropped due to handling. After another round of green-flag pit stops just after lap 160, many drivers took turns leading until Jamie McMurray took over on lap 175. Earnhardt moved into second as the field quickly went from three-wide to single file in the top lane, causing drivers such as Johnson, Kenseth, and Jeff Gordon to fall to the back. On the last lap, the field remained single-file and off of turn two, third place Austin Dillon got sideways and was then turned around backwards by fourth place Ricky Stenhouse Jr. Dillon backed around into the wall directly in the path of Casey Mears, whose hit to Dillon caused him to go airborne and almost flip. Meanwhile, the caution waved and Jamie McMurray scored his seventh career win, his first since the 2010 Bank of America 500. Earnhardt finished second, followed by Stenhouse, Paul Menard, Kyle Busch, David Ragan, and David Gilliland. Johnson finished 13th and Kenseth came home 20th, allowing Johnson to take the points lead.

Top ten results:

1. #1 - Jamie McMurray
2. #88 - Dale Earnhardt Jr.
3. #17 - Ricky Stenhouse Jr.
4. #27 - Paul Menard
5. #18 - Kyle Busch
6. #34 - David Ragan
7. #38 - David Gilliland
8. #56 - Martin Truex Jr.
9. #39 - Ryan Newman
10. #15 - Clint Bowyer

==== Round 33: Goody's Headache Relief Shot 500 ====
Denny Hamlin took the pole with a new track record, but was quickly passed by Jimmie Johnson on lap three. The caution first waved on lap eight as Carl Edwards spun Jeff Burton, causing minor damage to both. Ricky Stenhouse Jr., Kasey Kahne, Mark Martin, and Travis Kvapil received minor damage as well. The restart came on lap 20, and Kyle Busch passed for the lead on lap 26. Matt Kenseth then took the lead on lap 38. The second caution came out on lap 89 as Carl Edwards this time spun Travis Kvapil. Kenseth held the lead off of pit road and on the lap 95 restart, before being passed by Johnson on lap 111. The third caution was thrown for Bobby Labonte spinning David Reutimann in turn three on lap 141. Johnson held the lead after pit stops and on the restart on lap 147. On lap 167, Kyle Larson's engine blew to bring out the fourth caution. Jeff Burton stayed out but was quickly passed by Johnson after the lap 181 restart. Two laps later, as Burton and Earnhardt checked up near the front, a large stack of caused numerous cars to get damage, including polesitter Denny Hamlin, Kasey Kahne, Martin Truex Jr., Ken Schrader, and Aric Almirola. Kahne would get stuck in the turn one grass and would have to be towed back onto the track. Johnson continued to lead on the restart, but the sixth caution flew on lap 205 as Jamie McMurray and Kurt Busch got together. Busch spun and then collected Mark Martin. The race restarted on lap 210, and Kenseth retook the lead on lap 217, two laps before Travis Kvapil spun to bring out the seventh caution.

Kenseth held the lead on the restart as Johnson started to fall back. The eighth caution came out on lap 230 for another spin by David Reutimann and Johnson led Kyle Busch and Dale Earnhardt Jr., among others, down pit road as Kenseth and many others stayed out. Kenseth led on the lap 235 restart but was passed by Clint Bowyer on lap 239 and quickly fell back, falling all the way to 17th by the ninth caution on lap 285. Meanwhile, Johnson recovered to third by the caution as Jeff Gordon took the lead from Bowyer a lap earlier (lap 283). The caution came out for Reed Sorenson's stalled car on the track. Gordon and Johnson were the first two off of pit road and they held those positions on the lap 291 restart. On lap 298, the tenth caution fell over the track for debris off of Earnhardt's car. Landon Cassill was spun by Kasey Kahne on lap 309 to bring out the eleventh caution. Johnson fell to fourth on the lap 315 restart, and Kevin Harvick and Ryan Newman got together on lap 319 in turn one, causing Newman to spin and bring out the twelfth caution. On lap 328, Juan Pablo Montoya made it three-wide with Marcos Ambrose and Truex, causing Truex to get spun and cause the 13th caution. Jimmie Johnson pitted from sixth and fell to 20th for the lap 333 restart. Debris on the frontstretch caused the 14th caution on lap 338, and Gordon and Kyle Busch made pit stops, giving the lead to Denny Hamlin. Clint Bowyer then took the lead from Hamlin on lap 351 and led until Cole Whitt spun and hit the wall in turn three on lap 366 to cause to 15th caution. Hamlin was the first off of pit road, but Elliott Sadler stayed out to take the lead. Matt Kenseth took the lead on lap 374 and J. J. Yeley spun on lap 380 to bring out the 16th caution. Kenseth continued to lead through the 17th caution on lap 416 for debris in turn one and the following pit stops and held the lead on the lap 424 restart. Kenseth was passed for the lead by Jeff Gordon on lap 479 and Gordon scored his first win of the season ahead of Kenseth, Clint Bowyer, Brad Keselowski, and Jimmie Johnson. The win awarded the 2013 Manufacturer Championship to Chevrolet and the finishes by Kenseth and Johnson caused a tie in the championship points, with the tiebreaker going to Kenseth with more race victories.

This is the last race to date to not feature the iconic #43 car on the racetrack, as the number on Aric Almirola's car was changed to #41 for this race to commemorate Maurice Petty's induction into the NASCAR Hall of Fame.

Top ten results:

1. #24 - Jeff Gordon
2. #20 - Matt Kenseth
3. #15 - Clint Bowyer
4. #2 - Brad Keselowski
5. #48 - Jimmie Johnson
6. #29 - Kevin Harvick
7. #11 - Denny Hamlin
8. #88 - Dale Earnhardt Jr.
9. #16 - Greg Biffle
10. #1 - Jamie McMurray

==== Round 34: AAA Texas 500 ====
Carl Edwards took the pole and led 38 laps in the early going, but engine trouble relegated him to a 37th-place finish. Jimmie Johnson took over and dominated, leading 255 laps on the day, being interrupted only by Brad Keselowski, who led 30 laps as a result to pit strategy. Johnson won his sixth race of the season as Matt Kenseth, who had a pit road speeding penalty, battled an ill-handling racecar to finish fourth.

Top ten results:

1. #48 - Jimmie Johnson
2. #88 - Dale Earnhardt Jr.
3. #22 - Joey Logano
4. #20 - Matt Kenseth
5. #5 - Kasey Kahne
6. #2 - Brad Keselowski
7. #11 - Denny Hamlin
8. #29 - Kevin Harvick
9. #39 - Ryan Newman
10. #15 - Clint Bowyer

==== Round 35: AdvoCare 500 ====
Jimmie Johnson started the race with his fourth pole of the year, but in a lap one turn one scramble with Denny Hamlin and Joey Logano, he was bumped to the outside and fell back to sixth. Hamlin would then lead the first 18 laps, but relinquished the top spot to Jeff Gordon. Hamlin then fell all the way back to 23rd with a loose car before spinning out in turn two on lap 50 to bring out the first caution. Johnson had recovered to third by the caution, and followed Gordon and Kevin Harvick off of pit road. Harvick then took the lead from Gordon on the lap 56 restart. Lap 101 saw the second caution, and Kasey Kahne took two tires on pit road to take the lead, while Johnson fell to fifth, Gordon sixth, and Harvick seventh. Timmy Hill crashed in turn one to bring out the third caution on lap 117, and many drivers outside the top ten, including Clint Bowyer and Matt Kenseth, came in to pit. Brad Keselowski then took the lead from Kahne on the ensuing restart. The fourth caution came out on lap 132, as Travis Kvapil's engine blew up in front of Dave Blaney, causing Blaney to take evasive action and spin. Several drivers outside the top ten pitted, bumping Matt Kenseth up to 15th. However, as Keselowski continued to lead on the restart, Kenseth (battling an extremely tight racecar) dropped to 23rd before the field was slowed for the fifth time because of a crash involving Danica Patrick, Justin Allgaier, David Reutimann, and Cole Whitt. Many of the leaders pitted, but Jeff Gordon stayed out to take the lead, with Jamie McMurray and Ryan Newman just behind.

After heavy battling on the restart, Johnson and Carl Edwards got together in turn one on lap 163, causing them to fall to 26th and 27th, respectively, as J. J. Yeley spun behind them. Ryan Newman took the lead by not pitting, as Matt Kenseth had a 25-second stop to fall from seventh to 29th. Johnson restarted 25th and worked his way back into the top 15, as Newman continued to lead over Joey Logano. Lap 191 saw a hard crash for David Reutimann in turn one to cause to seventh caution, and all of the frontrunners came down pit road, leaving Joey Logano and Kasey Kahne out front. As Logano led after the restart, Johnson came from fifth to third, and Kenseth dropped from 12th place to 20th as his car continued to have handling problems. By lap 224, Kahne had run down and taken the lead from Logano, and Kenseth had further fallen to 25th. Kahne pitted on lap 247, allowing Johnson to lead his first lap of the race. Johnson pitted on lap later, giving the lead to Edwards, who then gave the lead to Kevin Harvick on lap 250. Harvick, Dale Earnhardt Jr., Kyle Busch, Clint Bowyer, and others stayed out several laps longer. Harvick ran out of fuel on lap 268, giving the lead to Earnhardt, who pitted on lap 271. Ryan Newman took the lead for four laps, then gave the top spot to Greg Biffle for a lap, before Carl Edwards cycled into a four-second lead over Kahne. The eighth caution waved on lap 282 for debris from Danica Patrick's car, and eleven lead lap cars stayed out, including Edwards, Kahne, Johnson, and Harvick. Edwards continued leading on the lap 289 restart over Kahne, but Harvick passed Johnson to move into third. Harvick passed Kahne on lap 295 and began trying to run down Edwards. However, Harvick could not close and Edwards appeared to be on his way to sweeping the 2013 Phoenix races. But with a lap and a half to go, Edwards ran out of fuel and Harvick took home the victory in his penultimate race with Richard Childress Racing. Kahne came in second and Johnson finished third, having led only one lap despite starting on pole. Edwards finished 21st, and Kenseth limped home in 23rd, losing 21 points to Johnson in the Championship standings to fall to 28 points behind.

Top ten results:

1. #29 - Kevin Harvick
2. #5 - Kasey Kahne
3. #48 - Jimmie Johnson
4. #88 - Dale Earnhardt Jr.
5. #78 - Kurt Busch
6. #42 - Juan Pablo Montoya
7. #18 - Kyle Busch
8. #56 - Martin Truex Jr.
9. #22 - Joey Logano
10. #39 - Ryan Newman

==== Round 36: Ford EcoBoost 400 ====
Matt Kenseth won his third pole of the year, with third-place in points Kevin Harvick starting sixth and points-leader Jimmie Johnson starting seventh. Kenseth had the dominant car for most of the race, leading a race high 144 laps. Later, after a restart with 74 laps remaining, Kenseth restarted in sixth and Johnson lines up behind him in eighth. Jeff Gordon restarted in fourth and spun his tires, causing an accordion effect that involved Johnson, Kenseth, Mark Martin, and others. Most of the damage was minimal, and Kenseth made his way up to finish second behind his teammate Denny Hamlin, who won his first race of the year. Harvick led eight laps to finished tenth and claim third in the points. Johnson, although he led no laps, finished in ninth place to win his sixth career championship by 19 points over Kenseth.

Top ten results:

1. #11 - Denny Hamlin
2. #20 - Matt Kenseth
3. #88 - Dale Earnhardt Jr.
4. #56 - Martin Truex Jr.
5. #15 - Clint Bowyer
6. #2 - Brad Keselowski
7. #18 - Kyle Busch
8. #22 - Joey Logano
9. #48 - Jimmie Johnson
10. #29 - Kevin Harvick

== Results and standings ==
=== Races ===
No.	Race	Pole position	Most laps led	Winning driver	Manufacturer	Report
	Sprint Unlimited at Daytona	Carl Edwards	Kevin Harvick	Kevin Harvick	Chevrolet	Report
	Budweiser Duel 1	Danica Patrick	Trevor Bayne	Kevin Harvick	Chevrolet	Report
	Budweiser Duel 2	Jeff Gordon	Jeff Gordon	Kyle Busch	Toyota	Report
1	Daytona 500	Danica Patrick	Matt Kenseth	Jimmie Johnson	Chevrolet	Report
2	Subway Fresh Fit 500	Mark Martin	Carl Edwards	Carl Edwards	Ford	Report
3	Kobalt Tools 400	Brad Keselowski	Kasey Kahne	Matt Kenseth	Toyota	Report
4	Food City 500	Kyle Busch	Denny Hamlin	Kasey Kahne	Chevrolet	Report
5	Auto Club 400	Denny Hamlin	Kyle Busch	Kyle Busch	Toyota	Report
6	STP Gas Booster 500	Jimmie Johnson	Jimmie Johnson	Jimmie Johnson	Chevrolet	Report
7	NRA 500	Kyle Busch	Kyle Busch	Kyle Busch	Toyota	Report
8	STP 400	Matt Kenseth	Matt Kenseth	Matt Kenseth	Toyota	Report
9	Toyota Owners 400	Matt Kenseth	Matt Kenseth	Kevin Harvick	Chevrolet	Report
10	Aaron's 499	Carl Edwards	Matt Kenseth	David Ragan	Ford	Report
11	Bojangles' Southern 500	Kurt Busch	Kyle Busch	Matt Kenseth	Toyota	Report
	NASCAR Sprint All-Star Race	Carl Edwards	Kyle Busch/Kurt Busch	Jimmie Johnson	Chevrolet	Report
12	Coca-Cola 600	Denny Hamlin	Kasey Kahne	Kevin Harvick	Chevrolet	Report
13	FedEx 400	Denny Hamlin	Kyle Busch	Tony Stewart	Chevrolet	Report
14	Party in the Poconos 400	Jimmie Johnson	Jimmie Johnson	Jimmie Johnson	Chevrolet	Report
15	Quicken Loans 400	Carl Edwards	Greg Biffle	Greg Biffle	Ford	Report
16	Toyota/Save Mart 350	Jamie McMurray	Martin Truex Jr.	Martin Truex Jr.	Toyota	Report
17	Quaker State 400	Dale Earnhardt Jr.	Jimmie Johnson	Matt Kenseth	Toyota	Report
18	Coke Zero 400	Kyle Busch	Jimmie Johnson	Jimmie Johnson	Chevrolet	Report
19	Camping World RV Sales 301	Brad Keselowski	Kurt Busch	Brian Vickers	Toyota	Report
20	Brickyard 400	Ryan Newman	Jimmie Johnson	Ryan Newman	Chevrolet	Report
21	Gobowling.com 400	Jimmie Johnson	Kasey Kahne	Kasey Kahne	Chevrolet	Report
22	Cheez-It 355 at The Glen	Marcos Ambrose	Marcos Ambrose	Kyle Busch	Toyota	Report
23	Pure Michigan 400	Joey Logano	Joey Logano	Joey Logano	Ford	Report
24	Irwin Tools Night Race	Denny Hamlin	Matt Kenseth	Matt Kenseth	Toyota	Report
25	AdvoCare 500	Ricky Stenhouse Jr.	Joey Logano	Kyle Busch	Toyota	Report
26	Federated Auto Parts 400	Jeff Gordon	Brad Keselowski	Carl Edwards	Ford	Report
Chase for the Sprint Cup
27	GEICO 400	Joey Logano	Matt Kenseth	Matt Kenseth	Toyota	Report
28	Sylvania 300	Ryan Newman	Matt Kenseth	Matt Kenseth	Toyota	Report
29	AAA 400	Dale Earnhardt Jr.	Jimmie Johnson	Jimmie Johnson	Chevrolet	Report
30	Hollywood Casino 400	Kevin Harvick	Kevin Harvick	Kevin Harvick	Chevrolet	Report
31	Bank of America 500	Jeff Gordon	Kasey Kahne	Brad Keselowski	Ford	Report
32	Camping World RV Sales 500	Aric Almirola	Jimmie Johnson	Jamie McMurray	Chevrolet	Report
33	Goody's Headache Relief Shot 500	Denny Hamlin	Matt Kenseth	Jeff Gordon	Chevrolet	Report
34	AAA Texas 500	Carl Edwards	Jimmie Johnson	Jimmie Johnson	Chevrolet	Report
35	AdvoCare 500	Jimmie Johnson	Kevin Harvick	Kevin Harvick	Chevrolet	Report
36	Ford EcoBoost 400	Matt Kenseth	Matt Kenseth	Denny Hamlin	Toyota	Report

=== Drivers ===
(key) Bold – Pole position awarded by time. Italics – Pole position set by final practice results or owner's points. * – Most laps led.

Pos.	Driver	DAY	PHO	LVS	BRI	CAL	MAR	TEX	KAN	RCH	TAL	DAR	CLT	DOV	POC	MCH	SON	KEN	DAY	NHA	IND	POC	GLN	MCH	BRI	ATL	RCH	CHI	NHA	DOV	KAN	CLT	TAL	MAR	TEX	PHO	HOM	Pts.
1	Jimmie Johnson	1	2	6	22	12	**1***	6	3	12	5	4	22	17	1*	28	9	9*	1*	6	2*	**13**	8	40	36	28	40	5	4	1*	6	4	13*	5	1*	**3**	9	2419
2	Matt Kenseth	37*	7	1	35	7	14	12	**1***	**7***	8*	1	15	40	25	6	19	1	33	9	5	22	23	15	1*	12	6	1*	1*	7	11	3	20	2*	4	23	**2***	2400
3	Kevin Harvick	42	13	9	14	13	13	13	12	1	40	5	1	8	9	2	10	10	3	7	19	17	13	2	34	9	11	3	20	6	**1***	6	12	6	8	1*	10	2385
4	Kyle Busch	34	23	4	**2**	1*	5	**1***	38	24	37	6*	38	4*	6	4	35	5	**12**	2	10	8	1	31	11	1	19	2	2	5	34	5	5	15	13	7	7	2364
5	Dale Earnhardt Jr.	2	5	7	6	2	24	29	16	10	17	9	39	10	3	37	12	**12**	8	14	6	5	30	36	10	8	13	35	6	**2**	8	15	2	8	2	4	3	2363
6	Jeff Gordon	20	9	25	34	11	3	38	13	11	11	3	35	3	12	39	2	8	34	10	7	2	36	17	7	6	**8**	6	15	4	3	**7**	14	1	38	14	11	2337
7	Clint Bowyer	11	6	27	5	35	2	15	5	2	18	11	8	6	15	7	5	3	4	13	20	14	6	5	14	39	25	9	17	10	14	11	10	3	10	20	5	2336
8	Joey Logano	19	26	12	17	3	23	5	39	3	35	22	5	7	10	9	11	4	40	40	8	7	7	**1***	5	2*	22	**37**	14	3	4	18	16	14	3	9	8	2323
9	Greg Biffle	6	17	17	11	6	9	4	19	36	36	13	31	15	2	1*	8	34	17	15	24	10	16	9	9	15	12	16	3	9	13	16	11	9	12	13	24	2321
10	Kurt Busch	28	27	20	4	5	37	37	15	9	30	**14**	3	12	7	35	4	6	6	31*	14	3	9	3	31	4	2	4	13	21	2	14	18	18	17	5	21	2309
11	Ryan Newman	5	40	38	7	10	31	10	14	15	32	10	6	36	5	18	15	14	10	39	**1**	4	14	13	21	5	3	10	**16**	8	35	8	9	38	9	10	17	2286
12	Kasey Kahne	36	19	2*	1	9	4	11	2	21	42	17	2*	23	36	38	6	11	32	11	3	1*	34	7	2	36	14	12	37	13	15	2*	36	27	5	2	13	2283
13	Carl Edwards	33	1*	5	18	4	15	3	17	6	**3**	7	11	14	18	**8**	3	21	29	8	13	11	4	10	39	18	1	11	9	35	5	10	17	12	**37**	21	12	2282
Chase for the Sprint Cup cut-off
Pos.	Driver	DAY	PHO	LVS	BRI	CAL	MAR	TEX	KAN	RCH	TAL	DAR	CLT	DOV	POC	MCH	SON	KEN	DAY	NHA	IND	POC	GLN	MCH	BRI	ATL	RCH	CHI	NHA	DOV	KAN	CLT	TAL	MAR	TEX	PHO	HOM	Pts.
14	Brad Keselowski	4	4	3	3	23	6	9	6	33	15	32	36	5	16	12	21	33	21	**4**	21	6	2	12	30	35	17*	7	11	37	17	1	29	4	6	11	6	1041
15	Jamie McMurray	32	22	13	10	19	7	16	7	26	23	16	19	33	13	33	**25**	2	7	12	15	16	11	22	19	11	4	19	5	11	16	19	1	10	31	18	30	1007
16	Martin Truex Jr.	24	36	8	12	18	40	2	4	17	7	12	9	38	23	3	1*	7	41	16	11	15	3	16	35	3	7	18	10	15	19	22	8	16	14	8	4	998
17	Paul Menard	21	20	10	9	8	19	17	10	13	26	19	13	20	30	14	14	30	43	17	12	32	17	4	6	24	5	22	22	18	7	24	4	22	15	16	39	949
18	Aric Almirola	13	15	16	37	14	20	7	8	8	10	20	33	18	21	17	20	15	38	5	17	20	37	18	15	20	20	13	21	22	10	23	22	20	27	19	16	913
19	Ricky Stenhouse Jr. **(R)**	12	16	18	16	20	25	40	11	16	13	18	14	13	26	16	27	17	11	34	25	34	18	19	18	**16**	10	8	24	17	30	13	3	31	16	12	22	909
20	Jeff Burton	30	10	26	32	17	18	23	18	5	28	21	12	11	11	10	31	19	16	3	43	36	26	8	13	34	18	14	8	14	12	21	21	11	24	17	23	906
21	Juan Pablo Montoya	39	12	19	30	38	26	20	27	4	25	8	18	2	14	20	34	16	39	24	9	28	5	11	3	7	16	32	19	23	18	12	41	13	20	6	18	894
22	Marcos Ambrose	18	18	22	19	36	8	19	20	42	14	34	10	19	17	23	7	13	26	33	16	12	**31***	6	8	13	27	15	18	16	9	17	39	19	21	26	26	872
23	Denny Hamlin	14	3	15	23*	**25**					34	2	**4**	**34**	8	30	23	35	36	21	18	43	19	20	**28**	38	21	33	12	20	23	9	38	**7**	7	28	1	753
24	Casey Mears	29	14	29	15	15	16	31	34	30	24	37	23	16	22	21	16	18	9	36	27	24	12	25	33	22	26	30	25	24	21	31	27	21	33	27	28	719
25	Mark Martin	3	**21**	14		37	10	14	9	38		25	34	9	19	26					23	18		27	20	25	9	17	23	19	22	42		36	11	15	19	649
26	David Gilliland	38	37	28	24	29	28	32	23	27	2	29	20	37	24	22	24	28	15	18	35	39	25	37	25	17	23	28	39	30	24	29	7	23	26	24	27	648
27	Danica Patrick **(R)**	**8**	39	33	28	26	12	28	25	29	33	28	29	24	29	13	29	23	14	37	30	35	20	23	26	21	30	20	27	29	43	20	33	17	25	33	20	646
28	David Ragan	35	38	31	21	24	30	26	30	20	1	39	25	22	37	25	33	26	22	19	34	21	21	24	12	23	29	26	29	25	36	30	6	43	42	35	29	633
29	Tony Stewart	41	8	11	31	22	17	21	21	18	27	15	7	1	4	5	28	20	2	26	4	9																594
30	Dave Blaney	17	33	24	36	21	29	25	43	23	16	27	30	29	31	31		40	31	23	37	23	27	30	22	26	31	23	31	33	25	32	25	39	35	30	38	526
31	Travis Kvapil	25	29	39	38	34	39	22	36	37	38	23	40	39	20	27	17	42	18	38	31	26	40	28	16	27	28	24	28	31	26	35	19	24	32	41	37	496
32	J. J. Yeley	10	28	36	27	27	27	39	35	32	31	35	28	30	39	24	42^{1}	32	13	29	39	25		43	24	30	36	25	33	34	27	43	28	30	30	29	32	472
33	David Reutimann	16	25	34	39	33	38	24	28	22	41	36	21	26	32	32	26	27	30	28	29	31	43	38	29	32	32	36	26	28	37	26	40	37	28	39	31	465
34	Bobby Labonte	15	24	30	41	28	21	42	24	19	20	26	24	21	27	43	43		23	27	36	19		35	38	INJ	INJ	INJ	40			28	34	32	40	22		412
35	A. J. Allmendinger		11		13	16				14					33	19		22	35	22	22	33	10			14	15	21		26	20						36	410
36	David Stremme		30	32	20	31	36	27	32	31	12	40	32	28	28	29	36	25	37	20	40	30	33	26	17	29	38											362
37	Michael McDowell	9	Wth	43	42	42	43	43	42	41	21	42	42	42	40	42		38	42	42	32	40	38		41	42	43	43	30	43	38	40	15	26	43	32	43	210
38	Timmy Hill **(R)**					39		36	33	34		33	27	35	35						42	27		29		31		34	36	36	28	36			41	34		190
39	Ken Schrader		34	37			32									34		29		30					27		37							28			34	118
40	Michael Waltrip	22									4								5														32					114
41	Scott Speed	23	41	41	40		41	DNQ			9	41	43						28		DNQ			41	40	43												99
42	Terry Labonte	26			25						29								19														35					87
43	Boris Said																18						22															48
44	Ron Fellows																22						35															31
45	Alex Kennedy																40					42	29															21
46	Justin Marks																30																					14
47	Scott Riggs		43		DNQ	41	42	DNQ	Wth					43	41	DNQ		43^{1}						DNQ					43									11
48	Victor Gonzalez Jr.																37						41															10
49	Brian Keselowski	DNQ								40													39															9
50	Tomy Drissi																38						42															8
51	Jacques Villeneuve																41																					3
52	Jason Leffler														43																							1
Ineligible for Sprint Cup driver points
Pos.	Driver	DAY	PHO	LVS	BRI	CAL	MAR	TEX	KAN	RCH	TAL	DAR	CLT	DOV	POC	MCH	SON	KEN	DAY	NHA	IND	POC	GLN	MCH	BRI	ATL	RCH	CHI	NHA	DOV	KAN	CLT	TAL	MAR	TEX	PHO	HOM	Pts.
	Regan Smith	7					22		22		6	24	17														QL											–
	Austin Dillon	31		21				33						27		11		24			26			14		19							26		22			–
	Elliott Sadler								40		DNQ																							25	19	25	14	–
	Trevor Bayne	27		23				18			43		16			15			20		28			21									23		29		40	–
	Kyle Larson																															37		42	23		15	–
	Max Papis																						15															–
	Parker Kligerman																																		18		25	–
	Josh Wise	40	35	35	26	40	35	30	26	28	19	38	26	25	34	40	32	39	25	35	38	41		39	37	41	41	41	32	42	40	41	30	34	39	36	41	–
	Landon Cassill		32	42	33	30	33	34	29	25	22	30	37	32	38			36	24	32	33	29	28	32	23	37	34	29	34	38	33	33	37	29	34	42	33	–
	Justin Allgaier																											27			39		24			31		–
	Owen Kelly																						24															–
	Joe Nemechek	43	31	40	29	32	34	35	DNQ	39	39	31	41	31	42	36		37	27	25	41	37		34	43	40	39	31	35	39	41	39	42	33	36	38	35	–
	Cole Whitt																											39		27	31	34	31	35		40		–
	Brian Scott																															27						–
	Tony Raines																					38			32		33	40	41	40	29		43	41		43	42	–
	Ryan Truex																								42		35			32								–
	Mike Bliss	DNQ	42	DNQ	43	43	DNQ	41	41	43		43	DNQ	41		41		41		43	DNQ				DNQ	33	DNQ											–
	Brendan Gaughan																							33														–
	Reed Sorenson																										42	42		41	42			40		37		–
	Sam Hornish Jr.								37																								DNQ					–
	Kevin Swindell																												38									–
	Blake Koch																															38						–
	Paulie Harraka																39																					–
	Morgan Shepherd																			41																		–
	Johnny Sauter																							42					42									–
	Jason Bowles																QL																					–
	Kenny Wallace																												QL									–
	Brian Vickers				8		11	8	31	35							13	31		1			32		4	10	24	38	7	12	32	25						-50^{2}
Pos.	Driver	DAY	PHO	LVS	BRI	CAL	MAR	TEX	KAN	RCH	TAL	DAR	CLT	DOV	POC	MCH	SON	KEN	DAY	NHA	IND	POC	GLN	MCH	BRI	ATL	RCH	CHI	NHA	DOV	KAN	CLT	TAL	MAR	TEX	PHO	HOM	Pts.

- ^{1} – Post entry, driver and owner did not score points.
- ^{2} – Despite running for Nationwide Series points, Brian Vickers was also deducted 50 points for his team's involvement in the fall Richmond race manipulation scandal.

=== Manufacturer ===
Pos	Manufacturer	Wins	Points
1	Chevrolet	16	**254**
2	Toyota	14	**229**
3	Ford	6	**194**

== See also ==
- 2013 NASCAR Nationwide Series
- 2013 NASCAR Camping World Truck Series
- 2013 NASCAR K&N Pro Series East
- 2013 NASCAR K&N Pro Series West
- 2013 ARCA Racing Series
- 2013 NASCAR Whelen Modified Tour
- 2013 NASCAR Whelen Southern Modified Tour
- 2013 NASCAR Canadian Tire Series
- 2013 NASCAR Toyota Series
- 2013 NASCAR Whelen Euro Series
