= 2013 AAA Texas 500 =

Race details
- Race 34 of 36 in the 2013 NASCAR Sprint Cup Series
- Simple line diagram of Texas Motor Speedway track layout
- Date: November 3, 2013
- Location: Texas Motor Speedway; Fort Worth, Texas, United States
- Course: Permanent racing facility
- Course length: 1.5 miles (2.4 km)
- Distance: 334 laps, 501 mi (806.3 km)
- Weather: Temperatures reaching up to 71.1 °F (21.7 °C); wind speeds up to 13 miles per hour (21 km/h)

Pole position
Driver	Carl Edwards	Roush Fenway Racing
- Time: 27.535 seconds (196.114 mph)

Most laps led
Driver	Jimmie Johnson	Hendrick Motorsports
- Laps: 255

Winner
No. 48	Jimmie Johnson	Hendrick Motorsports

Television in the United States
- Network: ESPN
- Announcers: Allen Bestwick, Dale Jarrett and Andy Petree

The 2013 AAA Texas 500 was a NASCAR Sprint Cup Series stock car race held on November 3, 2013, at Texas Motor Speedway in Fort Worth, Texas, United States.

== Report ==
=== Entry list ===
(R) - Denotes rookie driver.

(i) - Denotes driver who is ineligible for series driver points.

No.	Driver	Team	Manufacturer	Sponsor
1	Jamie McMurray	Earnhardt Ganassi Racing	Chevrolet	McDonald's
2	Brad Keselowski	Penske Racing	Ford	Miller Lite
5	Kasey Kahne	Hendrick Motorsports	Chevrolet	Time Warner Cable
7	Dave Blaney	Tommy Baldwin Racing	Chevrolet	Tommy Baldwin Racing
9	Marcos Ambrose	Richard Petty Motorsports	Ford	Mac Tools
10	Danica Patrick (R)	Stewart–Haas Racing	Chevrolet	GoDaddy.com
11	Denny Hamlin	Joe Gibbs Racing	Toyota	FedEx Office
13	Casey Mears	Germain Racing	Ford	GEICO
14	Mark Martin	Stewart–Haas Racing	Chevrolet	Bass Pro Shops / Mobil 1
15	Clint Bowyer	Michael Waltrip Racing	Toyota	Sour Apple Extra Strength 5-hour Energy
16	Greg Biffle	Roush Fenway Racing	Ford	3M Hire Our Heroes
17	Ricky Stenhouse Jr. (R)	Roush Fenway Racing	Ford	Ford EcoBoost
18	Kyle Busch	Joe Gibbs Racing	Toyota	Snickers
20	Matt Kenseth	Joe Gibbs Racing	Toyota	The Home Depot "Let's Do This"
21	Trevor Bayne (i)	Wood Brothers Racing	Ford	Motorcraft / Quick Lane Tire & Auto Center
22	Joey Logano	Penske Racing	Ford	AAA
24	Jeff Gordon	Hendrick Motorsports	Chevrolet	Drive to End Hunger
27	Paul Menard	Richard Childress Racing	Chevrolet	Quaker State / Menards
29	Kevin Harvick	Richard Childress Racing	Chevrolet	Budweiser
30	Parker Kligerman (i)	Swan Racing	Toyota	Swan Energy / Lean1
31	Jeff Burton	Richard Childress Racing	Chevrolet	Caterpillar
32	Timmy Hill (R)	FAS Lane Racing	Ford	U.S. Chrome
33	Austin Dillon (i)	Richard Childress Racing	Chevrolet	Boot Barn
34	David Ragan	Front Row Motorsports	Ford	SaferCar.gov
35	Josh Wise (i)	Front Row Motorsports	Ford	MDS Transport
36	J. J. Yeley	Tommy Baldwin Racing	Chevrolet	Accell Construction
38	David Gilliland	Front Row Motorsports	Ford	Long John Silver's
39	Ryan Newman	Stewart–Haas Racing	Chevrolet	Outback Steakhouse
40	Landon Cassill (i)	Circle Sport	Chevrolet	Pirate Oilfield Services
42	Juan Pablo Montoya	Earnhardt Ganassi Racing	Chevrolet	Target
43	Aric Almirola	Richard Petty Motorsports	Ford	Farmland
47	Bobby Labonte	JTG Daugherty Racing	Toyota	Clorox
48	Jimmie Johnson	Hendrick Motorsports	Chevrolet	Lowe's
51	Kyle Larson (i)	HScott Motorsports	Chevrolet	Dallas Convention & Visitors Bureau
55	Elliott Sadler (i)	Michael Waltrip Racing	Toyota	Aaron's Dream Machine
56	Martin Truex Jr.	Michael Waltrip Racing	Toyota	NAPA Auto Parts
78	Kurt Busch	Furniture Row Racing	Chevrolet	Furniture Row / Denver Mattress
83	David Reutimann	BK Racing	Toyota	Burger King / Dr Pepper
87	Joe Nemechek (i)	NEMCO-Jay Robinson Racing	Toyota	NEMCO-Jay Robinson Racing
88	Dale Earnhardt Jr.	Hendrick Motorsports	Chevrolet	AMP Energy Gold / 7-Eleven
93	Travis Kvapil	BK Racing	Toyota	Dr Pepper / Burger King
98	Michael McDowell	Phil Parsons Racing	Ford	Phil Parsons Racing
99	Carl Edwards	Roush Fenway Racing	Ford	Aflac
Official entry list

== Summary ==
Contested over 334 laps, it was the thirty-fourth, and the eighth race in the Chase for the Sprint Cup during the 2013 NASCAR Sprint Cup Series season. Jimmie Johnson of Hendrick Motorsports won the race, his sixth win of the season, while Dale Earnhardt Jr. finished second and Joey Logano finished third.

Kyle Busch, Jimmie Johnson and Matt Kenseth were considered the most likely to win this race according to the pundits while Brad Keselowski, Elliott Sadler and Juan Pablo Montoya were considered the extreme underdogs. Some of the racing experts predicted that Jeff Gordon, Denny Hamlin and Greg Biffle would initially make great lap times during the race but would ultimately falter in the end.

Before the race, the championship lead would be split between Kenseth and Johnson. With three racing remaining, it looked like a tiebreaker would have been needed if the stalemate had carried over into Homestead-Miami.

=== Top ten finishers ===
Pos	Grid	No.	Driver	Manufacturer	Laps	Laps led
1	3	48	Jimmie Johnson	Chevrolet	334	255
2	7	88	Dale Earnhardt Jr.	Chevrolet	334	0
3	12	22	Joey Logano	Ford	334	1
4	6	20	Matt Kenseth	Toyota	334	3
5	11	5	Kasey Kahne	Chevrolet	334	0
6	2	2	Brad Keselowski	Ford	334	30
7	14	11	Denny Hamlin	Toyota	334	0
8	19	29	Kevin Harvick	Chevrolet	334	0
9	13	39	Ryan Newman	Chevrolet	334	2
10	26	15	Clint Bowyer	Toyota	334	0

Previous race: 2013 Goody's Headache Relief Shot 500	Sprint Cup Series; 2013 season	Next race: 2013 AdvoCare 500
