= 2013 Budweiser Duels =

Qualifying races for the 2013 Daytona 500

The 2013 Budweiser Duels were a pair of NASCAR Sprint Cup Series stock car races that were held on February 21, 2013, at Daytona International Speedway in Daytona Beach, Florida. Both contested over 60 laps, were the qualifying races for the 2013 Daytona 500. The first race was won by Kevin Harvick for the Richard Childress Racing team. Greg Biffle finished second, while Juan Pablo Montoya, Jimmie Johnson, and Kurt Busch rounded out the top five. Afterward, the second race was won by Kyle Busch. Kasey Kahne followed in the second position, while Austin Dillon, Clint Bowyer, and Matt Kenseth rounded out the top five.

== Report ==
=== Background ===
Daytona International Speedway, where the races were held.

Daytona International Speedway is one of six superspeedways to hold NASCAR races, the others being Michigan International Speedway, Auto Club Speedway, Indianapolis Motor Speedway, Pocono Raceway and Talladega Superspeedway. The standard track at Daytona International Speedway is a four-turn superspeedway that is 2.5 miles (4.0 km) long. The track's turns are banked at 31 degrees, while the front stretch, the location of the finish line, is banked at 18 degrees.

=== Races ===
==== Race 1 ====
In the first Duel, consisting of cars that had qualified in an odd-numbered position, 2011 Daytona 500 winner Trevor Bayne dominated the race until Denny Hamlin lost control of his car on lap 53, crashing into Montoya, Edwards, and Bayne, ending their races. After the caution and green flag pit stops. Kevin Harvick took over the race lead and captured the first Duel, with Scott Speed taking the transfer spot. Brian Keselowski would be the only car in the first Duel that failed to qualify.

==== Race 2 ====
The second duel was dominated by Jeff Gordon. With no cautions, Kyle Busch took the lead after crew chief Dave Rogers made the call to take only fuel. Busch would hold off Kasey Kahne and Austin Dillon to take his second Duel win. Mike Bliss was the second driver to miss the Daytona 500 after getting a window net penalty early.

== Results ==
=== Qualifying 1 ===
Grid	No.	Driver	Team	Manufacturer	Time	Speed
1	10	Danica Patrick	Stewart–Haas Racing	Chevrolet	45.817	196.4341
2	21	Trevor Bayne	Wood Brothers Racing	Ford	45.924	195.976
3	14	Tony Stewart	Stewart–Haas Racing	Chevrolet	45.936	195.925
4	11	Denny Hamlin	Joe Gibbs Racing	Toyota	45.972	195.771
5	22	Joey Logano	Penske Racing	Ford	45.973	195.767
6	88	Dale Earnhardt Jr.	Hendrick Motorsports	Chevrolet	46.016	195.584
7	42	Juan Pablo Montoya	Earnhardt Ganassi Racing	Chevrolet	46.034	195.508
8	13	Casey Mears	Germain Racing	Ford	46.037	195.495
9	99	Carl Edwards	Roush Fenway Racing	Ford	46.097	195.240
10	56	Martin Truex Jr.	Michael Waltrip Racing	Toyota	46.105	195.207
11	48	Jimmie Johnson	Hendrick Motorsports	Chevrolet	46.134	195.084
12	2	Brad Keselowski	Penske Racing	Ford	46.163	194.461
13	29	Kevin Harvick	Richard Childress Racing	Chevrolet	46.215	194.742
14	16	Greg Biffle	Roush Fenway Racing	Ford	46.218	194.729
15	38	David Gilliland	Front Row Motorsports	Ford	46.236	194.654
16	26	Michael Waltrip	Swan Racing	Toyota	46.317	194.313
17	78	Kurt Busch	Furniture Row Racing	Chevrolet	46.474	193.657
18	95	Scott Speed	Leavine Family Racing	Ford	46.502	193.540
19	51	Regan Smith	Phoenix Racing	Chevrolet	46.609	193.096
20	47	Bobby Labonte	JTG Daugherty Racing	Toyota	46.738	192.563
21	83	David Reutimann	BK Racing	Toyota	47.284	190.339
22	87	Joe Nemechek	NEMCO Motorsports	Toyota	47.357	190.046
23	52	Brian Keselowski	Hamilton Means Racing	Toyota	48.946	183.876

=== Race results 1 ===
Pos	No.	Driver	Team	Manufacturer	Laps	Led
1	29	Kevin Harvick	Richard Childress Racing	Chevrolet	60	23
2	16	Greg Biffle	Roush Fenway Racing	Ford	60	0
3	42	Juan Pablo Montoya	Earnhardt Ganassi Racing	Chevrolet	60	0
4	48	Jimmie Johnson	Hendrick Motorsports	Chevrolet	60	0
5	78	Kurt Busch	Furniture Row Racing	Chevrolet	60	0
6	14	Tony Stewart	Stewart–Haas Racing	Chevrolet	60	0
7	2	Brad Keselowski	Penske Racing	Ford	60	0
8	13	Casey Mears	Germain Racing	Ford	60	0
9	88	Dale Earnhardt Jr.	Hendrick Motorsports	Chevrolet	60	0
10	22	Joey Logano	Penske Racing	Ford	60	0
11	47	Bobby Labonte	JTG Daugherty Racing	Toyota	60	0
12	38	David Gilliland	Front Row Motorsports	Ford	60	0
13	87	Joe Nemechek	NEMCO Motorsports	Toyota	60	0
14	26	Michael Waltrip	Swan Racing	Toyota	60	0
15	95	Scott Speed	Leavine Family Racing	Ford	60	0
16	83	David Reutimann	BK Racing	Toyota	60	0
17	10	Danica Patrick	Stewart–Haas Racing	Chevrolet	60	0
18	51	Regan Smith	Phoenix Racing	Chevrolet	60	0
19	56	Martin Truex Jr.	Michael Waltrip Racing	Toyota	60	0
20	11	Denny Hamlin	Joe Gibbs Racing	Toyota	59	0
21	52	Brian Keselowski	Hamilton Means Racing	Toyota	58	0
22	99	Carl Edwards	Roush Fenway Racing	Ford	52	0
23	21	Trevor Bayne	Wood Brothers Racing	Ford	52	37
^{†} Truex Jr. black-flagged for window out of car.

=== Qualifying 2 ===
Grid	No.	Driver	Team	Manufacturer	Speed
1	24	Jeff Gordon	Hendrick Motorsports	Chevrolet	196.292
2	39	Ryan Newman	Stewart–Haas Racing	Chevrolet	195.946
3	5	Kasey Kahne	Hendrick Motorsports	Chevrolet	195.852
4	18	Kyle Busch	Joe Gibbs Racing	Toyota	195.7674
5	20	Matt Kenseth	Joe Gibbs Racing	Toyota	195.725
6	17	Ricky Stenhouse Jr.	Roush Fenway Racing	Ford	195.537
7	27	Paul Menard	Richard Childress Racing	Chevrolet	195.503
8	33	Austin Dillon	Richard Childress Racing	Chevrolet	195.385
9	15	Clint Bowyer	Michael Waltrip Racing	Toyota	195.228
10	31	Jeff Burton	Richard Childress Racing	Chevrolet	195.156
11	1	Jamie McMurray	Earnhardt Ganassi Racing	Chevrolet	195.042
12	9	Marcos Ambrose	Richard Petty Motorsports	Ford	194.793
13	43	Aric Almirola	Richard Petty Motorsports	Ford	194.742
14	55	Mark Martin	Michael Waltrip Racing	Toyota	194.683
15	34	David Ragan	Front Row Motorsports	Ford	194.616
16	35	Josh Wise	Front Row Motorsports	Ford	194.254
17	98	Michael McDowell	Phil Parsons Racing	Ford	193.544
18	32	Terry Labonte	FAS Lane Racing	Ford	193.515
19	7	Dave Blaney	Tommy Baldwin Racing	Chevrolet	192.996
20	36	J. J. Yeley	Tommy Baldwin Racing	Chevrolet	192.024
21	93	Travis Kvapil	BK Racing	Toyota	190.142
22	19	Mike Bliss	Humphrey Smith Racing	Toyota	189.438

=== Race results 2 ===
Pos	No.	Driver	Team	Manufacturer	Laps	Time	Led
1	18	Kyle Busch	Joe Gibbs Racing	Toyota	60	0:46:50	19
2	5	Kasey Kahne	Hendrick Motorsports	Chevrolet	60	+0.093	0
3	33	Austin Dillon	Richard Childress Racing	Chevrolet	60	+0.203	0
4	15	Clint Bowyer	Michael Waltrip Racing	Toyota	60	+0.314	1
5	20	Matt Kenseth	Joe Gibbs Racing	Toyota	60	+0.403	0
6	55	Mark Martin	Michael Waltrip Racing	Toyota	60	+0.831	0
7	27	Paul Menard	Richard Childress Racing	Chevrolet	60	+3.747	0
8	31	Jeff Burton	Richard Childress Racing	Chevrolet	60	+9.425	0
9	1	Jamie McMurray	Earnhardt Ganassi Racing	Chevrolet	60	+17.232	0
10	34	David Ragan	Front Row Motorsports	Ford	60	+17.442	0
11	9	Marcos Ambrose	Richard Petty Motorsports	Ford	60	+17.660	1
12	24	Jeff Gordon	Hendrick Motorsports	Chevrolet	60	+38.154	38
13	43	Aric Almirola	Richard Petty Motorsports	Ford	60	+38.305	0
14	17	Ricky Stenhouse Jr.	Roush Fenway Racing	Ford	59	+1 lap	0
15	7	Dave Blaney	Tommy Baldwin Racing	Chevrolet	59	+1 lap	0
16	35	Josh Wise	Front Row Motorsports	Ford	59	+1 lap	0
17	93	Travis Kvapil	BK Racing	Toyota	59	+1 lap	0
18	32	Terry Labonte	FAS Lane Racing	Ford	59	+1 lap	0
19	98	Michael McDowell	Phil Parsons Racing	Ford	59	+1 lap	0
20	36	J. J. Yeley	Tommy Baldwin Racing	Chevrolet	59	+1 lap	0
21	39	Ryan Newman	Stewart–Haas Racing	Chevrolet	58	+2 laps	1
22	19	Mike Bliss	Humphrey Smith Racing	Toyota	55	+5 laps	0
