= 2013 Bojangles' Southern 500 =

Race details
- Race 11 of 36 in the 2013 NASCAR Sprint Cup Series
- Date: May 11, 2013
- Location: Darlington Raceway, Darlington, South Carolina, U.S.
- Course: Permanent racing facility
- Course length: 1.366 miles (2.198 km)
- Distance: 367 laps, 501.322 mi (806.799 km)
- Weather: Clear with a temperature around 82 °F (28 °C); wind out of the SW at 13 miles per hour (21 km/h).
- Average speed: 141.383 mph (227.534 km/h)

Pole position
Driver	Kurt Busch	Furniture Row Racing
- Time: 27.032 seconds

Most laps led
Driver	Kyle Busch	Joe Gibbs Racing
- Laps: 265

Winner
No. 20	Matt Kenseth	Joe Gibbs Racing

Television in the United States
- Network: Fox
- Announcers: Mike Joy, Darrell Waltrip, Larry McReynolds
- Nielsen ratings: 3.8/7 (5.9 million viewers)

The 2013 Bojangles' Southern 500, the 64th running of the event, was a NASCAR Sprint Cup Series stock car race held on May 11, 2013, at Darlington Raceway in Darlington, South Carolina, United States. The race was contested over 367 laps on the 1.366–mile (2.198 km) oval, it was the eleventh race of the 2013 Sprint Cup Series championship. Matt Kenseth of Joe Gibbs Racing won the race, his third win of the 2013 season, while his teammate Denny Hamlin finished second. Jeff Gordon grabbed his 300th top 5 finish in his 700th Sprint Cup start, while Jimmie Johnson and Kevin Harvick rounded out the top five.

There were five cautions for 25 laps and nine lead changes between four different drivers throughout the course of the race. The result moved Kenseth to the third position in the Drivers' Championship, 59 points behind Jimmie Johnson in first and five ahead of Dale Earnhardt Jr. in fourth. Chevrolet maintained its lead in the Manufacturers' Championship, two points ahead of Toyota and 18 ahead of Ford, with 25 races remaining in the season.

== Report ==
=== Background ===
Darlington Raceway, the race track where the race was held.

Darlington Raceway is a four-turn 1.366 mi (2.198 km) oval. The track's first two turns are banked at twenty-five degrees, while the final two turns are banked two degrees lower at twenty-three degrees. The front stretch (the location of the finish line) and the back stretch is banked at six degrees. Darlington Raceway can seat up to 60,000 people. Jimmie Johnson was the defending race winner after winning the event during the 2012 race.

Before the race, Johnson was leading the Drivers' Championship with 383 points, while Carl Edwards stood in second with 342 points. Dale Earnhardt Jr. followed in the third with 324, seven ahead of Matt Kenseth in fourth, and eight ahead of Clint Bowyer in fifth. Brad Keselowski, with 314, was in sixth; fifteen points ahead of Kasey Kahne. Eighth-placed Aric Almirola was three points ahead of Paul Menard and eight ahead of Kyle Busch in ninth and tenth. Greg Biffle was eleventh with 280, while Kevin Harvick completed the first twelve positions with 279 points. In the Manufacturers' Championship, Chevrolet was leading with 68 points, five points ahead of Toyota. Ford was third after recording only 52 points during the first ten races.

=== Entry list ===
(R) - Denotes rookie driver.

(i) - Denotes driver who is ineligible for series driver points.

No.	Driver	Team	Manufacturer
1	Jamie McMurray	Earnhardt Ganassi Racing	Chevrolet
2	Brad Keselowski	Penske Racing	Ford
5	Kasey Kahne	Hendrick Motorsports	Chevrolet
7	Dave Blaney	Tommy Baldwin Racing	Chevrolet
9	Marcos Ambrose	Richard Petty Motorsports	Ford
10	Danica Patrick (R)	Stewart–Haas Racing	Chevrolet
11	Denny Hamlin	Joe Gibbs Racing	Toyota
13	Casey Mears	Germain Racing	Ford
14	Tony Stewart	Stewart–Haas Racing	Chevrolet
15	Clint Bowyer	Michael Waltrip Racing	Toyota
16	Greg Biffle	Roush Fenway Racing	Ford
17	Ricky Stenhouse Jr. (R)	Roush Fenway Racing	Ford
18	Kyle Busch	Joe Gibbs Racing	Toyota
19	Mike Bliss (i)	Humphrey Smith Racing	Toyota
20	Matt Kenseth	Joe Gibbs Racing	Toyota
22	Joey Logano	Penske Racing	Ford
24	Jeff Gordon	Hendrick Motorsports	Chevrolet
27	Paul Menard	Richard Childress Racing	Chevrolet
29	Kevin Harvick	Richard Childress Racing	Chevrolet
30	David Stremme	Swan Racing	Toyota
31	Jeff Burton	Richard Childress Racing	Chevrolet
32	Timmy Hill (R)	FAS Lane Racing	Ford
33	Landon Cassill	Circle Sport	Chevrolet
34	David Ragan	Front Row Motorsports	Ford
35	Josh Wise (i)	Front Row Motorsports	Ford
36	J. J. Yeley	Tommy Baldwin Racing	Chevrolet
38	David Gilliland	Front Row Motorsports	Ford
39	Ryan Newman	Stewart–Haas Racing	Chevrolet
42	Juan Pablo Montoya	Earnhardt Ganassi Racing	Chevrolet
43	Aric Almirola	Richard Petty Motorsports	Ford
47	Bobby Labonte	JTG Daugherty Racing	Toyota
48	Jimmie Johnson	Hendrick Motorsports	Chevrolet
51	Regan Smith (i)	Phoenix Racing	Chevrolet
55	Mark Martin	Michael Waltrip Racing	Toyota
56	Martin Truex Jr.	Michael Waltrip Racing	Toyota
78	Kurt Busch	Furniture Row Racing	Chevrolet
83	David Reutimann	BK Racing	Toyota
87	Joe Nemechek (i)	NEMCO-Jay Robinson Racing	Toyota
88	Dale Earnhardt Jr.	Hendrick Motorsports	Chevrolet
93	Travis Kvapil	BK Racing	Toyota
95	Scott Speed	Leavine Family Racing	Ford
98	Michael McDowell	Phil Parsons Racing	Ford
99	Carl Edwards	Roush Fenway Racing	Ford
Official entry list

=== Practice and qualifying ===
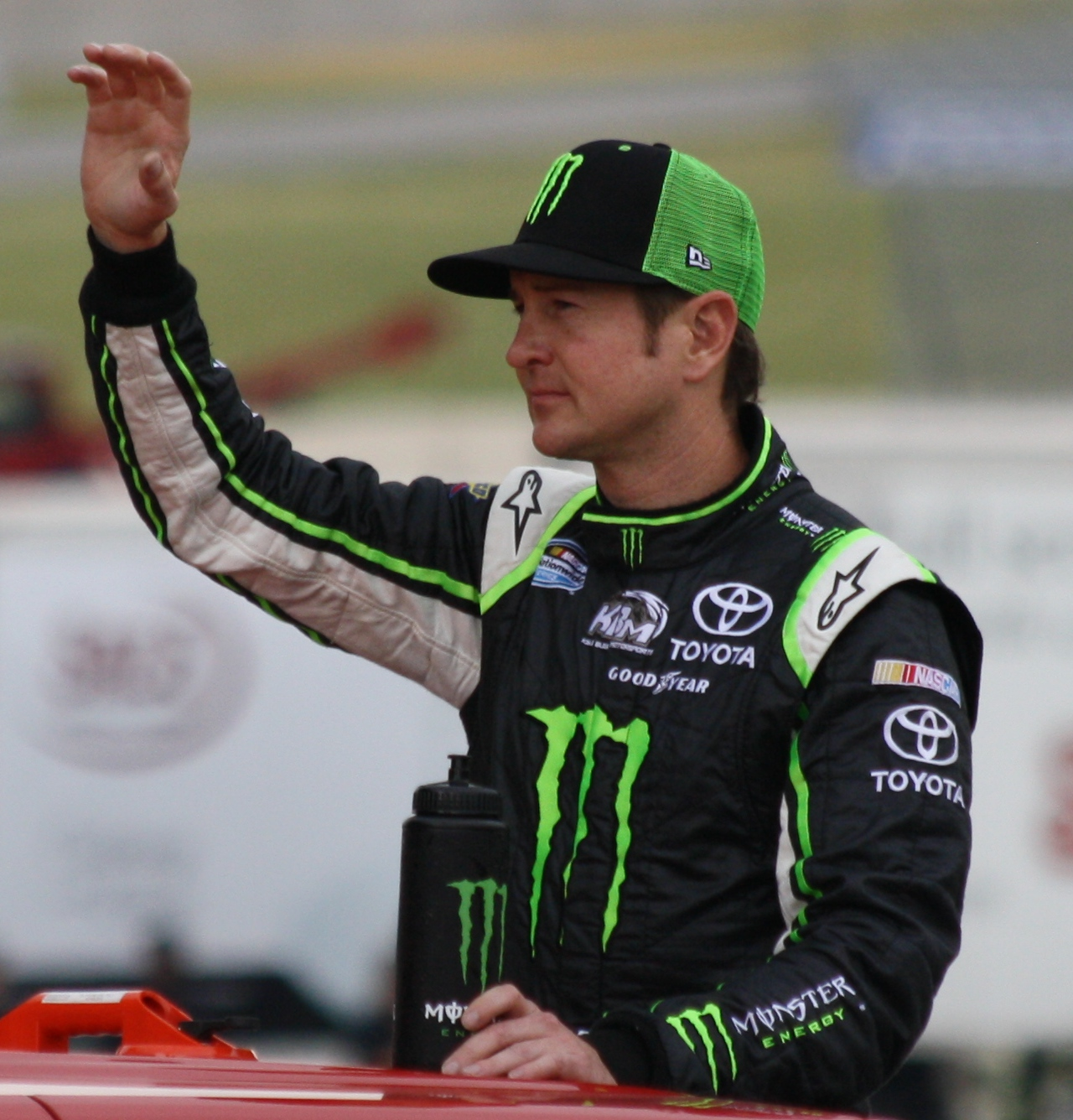
Kurt Busch (shown here in 2012) won his sixteenth career pole position.

Two practice sessions were held in preparation for the race; both on Friday, May 10, 2013. The first session lasted for 120 minutes, while second session was 45 minutes long. During the first practice session, Menard, for the Richard Childress Racing team, was quickest ahead of Bowyer in second and McMurray in third. Earnhardt Jr. was scored fourth, and Edwards managed fifth. Kyle Busch, Martin Truex Jr., Juan Pablo Montoya, Kenseth, and Biffle rounded out the top ten quickest drivers in the session.

Montoya was quickest in the second and final practice session, ahead of Ricky Stenhouse Jr. in second and Edwards in third. Jeff Burton was fourth quickest, and Kurt Busch took fifth. Biffle, Kenseth, Jeff Gordon, Truex Jr., and Kyle Busch followed in the top ten.

During qualifying, forty-three cars were entered. Kurt Busch clinched his first pole position of the season, with a record time of 27.032 seconds. After his qualifying run, Kurt Busch commented, "Wow, what an incredible lap. The way the team gave me the confidence right when we first unloaded, the team deserves all the credit. This gives me a great shot to stay ahead of the field and win by two-thousandths of a second this time." He was joined on the front row of the grid by Johnson. Kyle Busch qualified third, Kahne took fourth, and Truex Jr. started fifth. Denny Hamlin, Kenseth, Gordon, Biffle, and Harvick completed the first ten positions on the grid.

=== Race ===
Kurt Busch started on Pole in the #78 Furniture Row Racing Chevrolet and would lead the early laps until his younger brother Kyle Busch took the lead from him.

In a rather dominate effort, Kyle would lead a majority of the race until around 50 to go Kasey Kahne would challenge him. While racing for the lead Kahne would make contact with the wall ending his chances at victory with 20 to go.

After Kahne’s misfortune it appeared to be Kyle Busch’s race to lose until his Joe Gibbs Racing teammate Matt Kenseth started charging hard in the last 20 laps. Kenseth would catch Busch and quickly pass him going onto win his 3rd race of the 2013 season, his first season with Joe Gibbs Racing.

== Results ==
=== Qualifying ===
Grid	No.	Driver	Team	Manufacturer	Time	Speed
1	78	Kurt Busch	Furniture Row Racing	Chevrolet	27.032	181.918
2	48	Jimmie Johnson	Hendrick Motorsports	Chevrolet	27.173	180.974
3	18	Kyle Busch	Joe Gibbs Racing	Toyota	27.181	180.920
4	5	Kasey Kahne	Hendrick Motorsports	Chevrolet	27.208	180.741
5	56	Martin Truex Jr.	Michael Waltrip Racing	Toyota	27.277	180.284
6	11	Denny Hamlin	Joe Gibbs Racing	Toyota	27.296	180.158
7	20	Matt Kenseth	Joe Gibbs Racing	Toyota	27.303	180.112
8	24	Jeff Gordon	Hendrick Motorsports	Chevrolet	27.304	180.105
9	16	Greg Biffle	Roush Fenway Racing	Ford	27.320	180.000
10	29	Kevin Harvick	Richard Childress Racing	Chevrolet	27.355	179.770
11	31	Jeff Burton	Richard Childress Racing	Chevrolet	27.368	179.684
12	42	Juan Pablo Montoya	Earnhardt Ganassi Racing	Chevrolet	27.376	179.632
13	15	Clint Bowyer	Michael Waltrip Racing	Toyota	27.381	179.599
14	17	Ricky Stenhouse Jr.	Roush Fenway Racing	Ford	27.394	179.514
15	27	Paul Menard	Richard Childress Racing	Chevrolet	27.401	179.468
16	88	Dale Earnhardt Jr.	Hendrick Motorsports	Chevrolet	27.410	179.409
17	99	Carl Edwards	Roush Fenway Racing	Ford	27.472	179.004
18	43	Aric Almirola	Richard Petty Motorsports	Ford	27.500	178.822
19	13	Casey Mears	Germain Racing	Ford	27.501	178.815
20	14	Tony Stewart	Stewart–Haas Racing	Chevrolet	27.511	178.750
21	39	Ryan Newman	Stewart–Haas Racing	Chevrolet	27.550	178.497
22	55	Mark Martin	Michael Waltrip Racing	Toyota	27.578	178.316
23	47	Bobby Labonte	JTG Daugherty Racing	Toyota	27.593	178.219
24	9	Marcos Ambrose	Richard Petty Motorsports	Ford	27.630	177.980
25	1	Jamie McMurray	Earnhardt Ganassi Racing	Chevrolet	27.631	177.974
26	2	Brad Keselowski	Penske Racing	Ford	27.633	177.961
27	51	Regan Smith	Phoenix Racing	Chevrolet	27.635	177.948
28	93	Travis Kvapil	BK Racing	Toyota	27.669	177.730
29	38	David Gilliland	Front Row Motorsports	Ford	27.676	177.685
30	22	Joey Logano	Penske Racing	Ford	27.681	177.653
31	34	David Ragan	Front Row Motorsports	Ford	27.682	177.646
32	33	Landon Cassill	Circle Sport	Chevrolet	27.736	177.300
33	83	David Reutimann	BK Racing	Toyota	27.775	177.051
34	35	Josh Wise	Front Row Motorsports	Ford	27.835	176.670
35	98	Michael McDowell	Phil Parsons Racing	Ford	27.837	176.657
36	95	Scott Speed	Leavine Family Racing	Ford	27.884	176.359
37	7	Dave Blaney	Tommy Baldwin Racing	Chevrolet	27.954	175.918
38	19	Mike Bliss	Humphrey Smith Motorsports	Toyota	27.961	175.874
39	30	David Stremme	Swan Racing	Toyota	27.981	175.748
40	10	Danica Patrick	Stewart–Haas Racing	Chevrolet	28.014	175.541
41	32	Timmy Hill	FAS Lane Racing	Ford	28.080	175.128
42	36	J. J. Yeley	Tommy Baldwin Racing	Chevrolet	28.083	175.109
43	87	Joe Nemechek	NEMCO-Jay Robinson Racing	Toyota	28.315	173.675

=== Race results ===
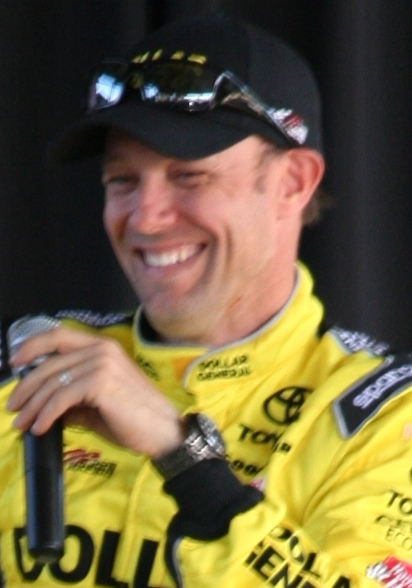
Matt Kenseth won the race.

Pos	Car	Driver	Team	Manufacturer	Laps	Points
1	20	Matt Kenseth	Joe Gibbs Racing	Toyota	367	47
2	11	Denny Hamlin	Joe Gibbs Racing	Toyota	367	42
3	24	Jeff Gordon	Hendrick Motorsports	Chevrolet	367	42
4	48	Jimmie Johnson	Hendrick Motorsports	Chevrolet	367	40
5	29	Kevin Harvick	Richard Childress Racing	Chevrolet	367	39
6	18	Kyle Busch	Joe Gibbs Racing	Toyota	367	40
7	99	Carl Edwards	Roush Fenway Racing	Ford	367	37
8	42	Juan Pablo Montoya	Earnhardt Ganassi Racing	Chevrolet	367	36
9	88	Dale Earnhardt Jr.	Hendrick Motorsports	Chevrolet	367	35
10	39	Ryan Newman	Stewart–Haas Racing	Chevrolet	367	34
11	15	Clint Bowyer	Michael Waltrip Racing	Toyota	367	33
12	56	Martin Truex Jr.	Michael Waltrip Racing	Toyota	367	32
13	16	Greg Biffle	Roush Fenway Racing	Ford	367	31
14	78	Kurt Busch	Furniture Row Racing	Chevrolet	367	31
15	14	Tony Stewart	Stewart–Haas Racing	Chevrolet	367	29
16	1	Jamie McMurray	Earnhardt Ganassi Racing	Chevrolet	367	28
17	5	Kasey Kahne	Hendrick Motorsports	Chevrolet	367	27
18	17	Ricky Stenhouse Jr.	Roush Fenway Racing	Ford	366	26
19	27	Paul Menard	Richard Childress Racing	Chevrolet	366	25
20	43	Aric Almirola	Richard Petty Motorsports	Ford	366	24
21	31	Jeff Burton	Richard Childress Racing	Chevrolet	365	23
22	22	Joey Logano	Penske Racing	Ford	365	22
23	93	Travis Kvapil	BK Racing	Toyota	364	21
24	51	Regan Smith	Phoenix Racing	Chevrolet	363	–
25	55	Mark Martin	Michael Waltrip Racing	Toyota	363	19
26	47	Bobby Labonte	JTG Daugherty Racing	Toyota	363	18
27	7	Dave Blaney	Tommy Baldwin Racing	Chevrolet	362	17
28	10	Danica Patrick	Stewart–Haas Racing	Chevrolet	362	16
29	38	David Gilliland	Front Row Motorsports	Ford	362	15
30	33	Landon Cassill	Circle Sport	Chevrolet	360	14
31	87	Joe Nemechek	NEMCO-Jay Robinson Racing	Toyota	359	–
32	2	Brad Keselowski	Penske Racing	Ford	358	12
33	32	Timmy Hill	FAS Lane Racing	Ford	358	11
34	9	Marcos Ambrose	Richard Petty Motorsports	Ford	358	10
35	36	J. J. Yeley	Tommy Baldwin Racing	Chevrolet	354	9
36	83	David Reutimann	BK Racing	Toyota	327	8
37	13	Casey Mears	Germain Racing	Ford	327	7
38	35	Josh Wise	Front Row Motorsports	Ford	326	–
39	34	David Ragan	Front Row Motorsports	Ford	318	5
40	30	David Stremme	Swan Racing	Toyota	230	4
41	95	Scott Speed	Leavine Family Racing	Ford	77	3
42	98	Michael McDowell	Phil Parsons Racing	Ford	58	2
43	19	Mike Bliss	Humphrey Smith Motorsports	Toyota	18	–

== Standings after the race ==
Drivers' Championship standings

	Pos	Driver	Points
	1	Jimmie Johnson	423
	2	Carl Edwards	379 (–44)
1	3	Matt Kenseth	364 (–59)
1	4	Dale Earnhardt Jr.	359 (–64)
	5	Clint Bowyer	349 (–74)

Manufacturers' Championship standings

Pos	Manufacturer	Points
1	Chevrolet	74
2	Toyota	72 (–2)
3	Ford	56 (–18)

- Note: Only the first twelve positions are included for the driver standings.

Previous race: 2013 Aaron's 499	Sprint Cup Series; 2013 season	Next race: 2013 Coca-Cola 600
