= 2013 STP 400 =

Auto race held at Kansas City in 2013

Race details
- Race 8 of 36 in the 2013 NASCAR Sprint Cup Series
- Date: April 21, 2013
- Location: Kansas Speedway, Kansas City, Kansas, U.S.
- Course: Permanent racing facility
- Course length: 1.5 miles (2.4 km)
- Distance: 267 laps, 400.5 mi (644.5 km)
- Weather: Overcast with a temperature around 60 °F (16 °C); wind out of the S at 10 miles per hour (16 km/h).
- Average speed: 119.546 mph (192.391 km/h)

Pole position
Driver	Matt Kenseth	Joe Gibbs Racing
- Time: 28.145 seconds

Most laps led
Driver	Matt Kenseth	Joe Gibbs Racing
- Laps: 163

Winner
No. 20	Matt Kenseth	Joe Gibbs Racing

Television in the United States
- Network: Fox
- Announcers: Mike Joy, Darrell Waltrip, Larry McReynolds
- Nielsen ratings: 4.2/10 (6.495 million viewers)

The 2013 STP 400 was a NASCAR Sprint Cup Series stock car race that was held on April 21, 2013, at Kansas Speedway in Kansas City, Kansas, United States. Contested over 267 laps on the 1.5–mile (2.4 km) tri-oval, it was the eighth race of the 2013 Sprint Cup Series championship. Matt Kenseth of Joe Gibbs Racing won the race, his second win of the 2013 season and second straight at Kansas Speedway, while Kasey Kahne finished second. Jimmie Johnson, Martin Truex Jr. and Clint Bowyer rounded out the top five

This was the third straight Sprint Cup race of 2013 where the winner won from the pole and led the most laps, following wins by Jimmie Johnson at Martinsville and Kyle Busch at Texas. This was the first such streak in over 28 years (the last time there were three straight races won from the pole was in 1985; with Bill Elliott at Michigan, Dale Earnhardt at Bristol, and Elliott at Darlington).

== Report ==
=== Background ===
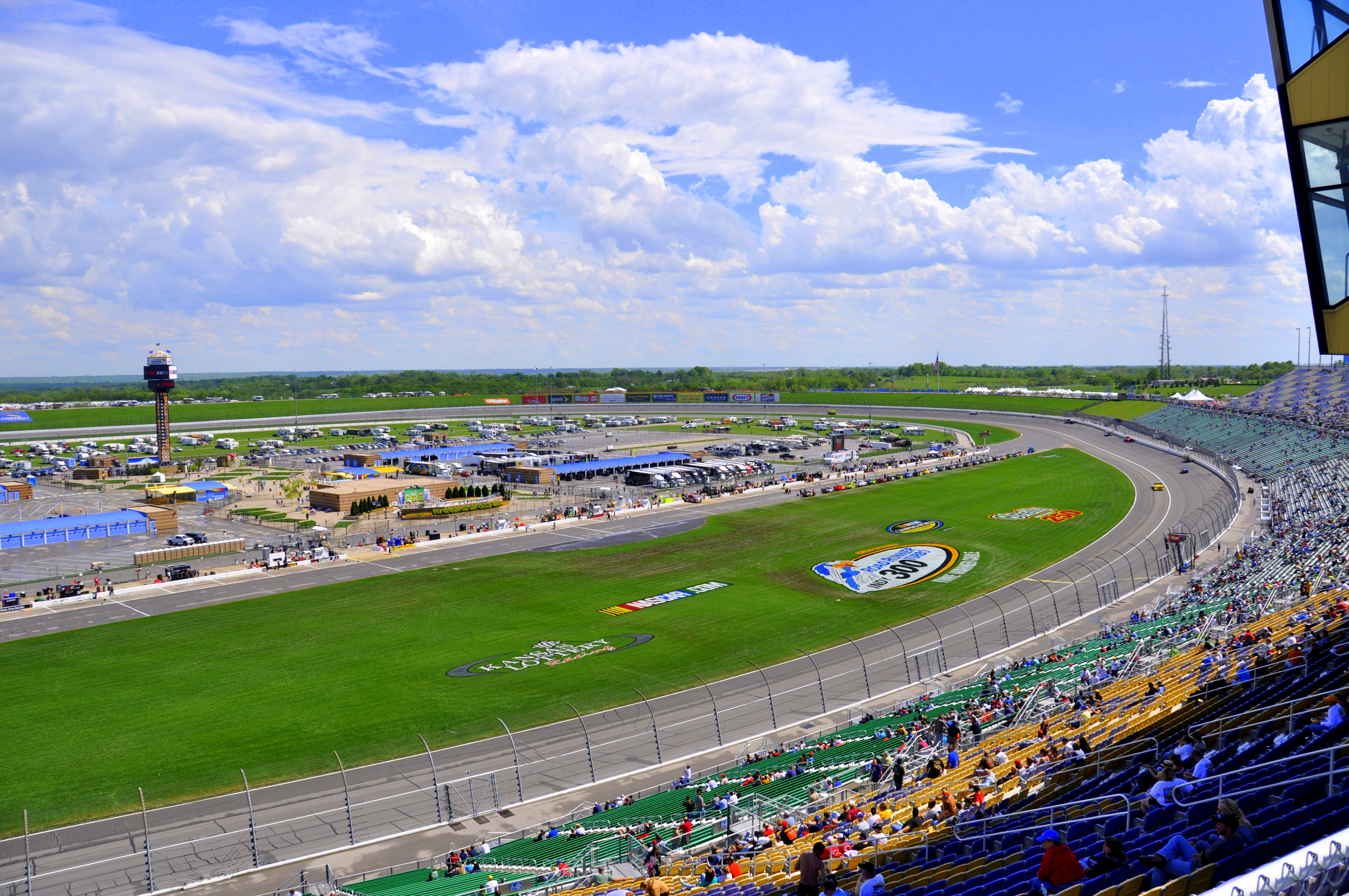
Kansas Speedway, the race track where the race was held.

Kansas Speedway is a four-turn tri-oval track that is 1.5 miles (2.4 km) long. The track's turns are banked from seventeen to twenty degrees, while the front stretch, the location of the finish line, is nine to eleven degrees. The back stretch, opposite of the front, is at only five degrees. The racetrack has a seating capacity for more than 72,000 spectators. Denny Hamlin was the defending race winner after winning the event in 2012.

Before the race, Jimmie Johnson was leading the Drivers' Championship with 269 points, while Kyle Busch stood in second with 251 points. Greg Biffle followed in the third position, four points ahead of Brad Keselowski and five ahead of Carl Edwards in fourth and fifth. Dale Earnhardt Jr., with 234, was two points ahead of Kasey Kahne and twenty-six ahead of Clint Bowyer, as Paul Menard was two points ahead of Matt Kenseth and fourteen ahead of Kevin Harvick in tenth and eleventh. Jamie McMurray completed the first twelve positions with 190 points.

=== Entry list ===
(R) - Denotes rookie driver.

(i) - Denotes driver who is ineligible for series driver points.

No.	Driver	Team	Manufacturer
1	Jamie McMurray	Earnhardt Ganassi Racing	Chevrolet
2	Brad Keselowski	Penske Racing	Ford
5	Kasey Kahne	Hendrick Motorsports	Chevrolet
7	Dave Blaney	Tommy Baldwin Racing	Chevrolet
9	Marcos Ambrose	Richard Petty Motorsports	Ford
10	Danica Patrick (R)	Stewart–Haas Racing	Chevrolet
11	Brian Vickers (i)	Joe Gibbs Racing	Toyota
12	Sam Hornish Jr. (i)	Penske Racing	Ford
13	Casey Mears	Germain Racing	Ford
14	Tony Stewart	Stewart–Haas Racing	Chevrolet
15	Clint Bowyer	Michael Waltrip Racing	Toyota
16	Greg Biffle	Roush Fenway Racing	Ford
17	Ricky Stenhouse Jr. (R)	Roush Fenway Racing	Ford
18	Kyle Busch	Joe Gibbs Racing	Toyota
19	Mike Bliss (i)	Humphrey Smith Racing	Toyota
20	Matt Kenseth	Joe Gibbs Racing	Toyota
22	Joey Logano	Penske Racing	Ford
24	Jeff Gordon	Hendrick Motorsports	Chevrolet
27	Paul Menard	Richard Childress Racing	Chevrolet
29	Kevin Harvick	Richard Childress Racing	Chevrolet
30	David Stremme	Swan Racing	Toyota
31	Jeff Burton	Richard Childress Racing	Chevrolet
32	Timmy Hill (R)	FAS Lane Racing	Ford
33	Landon Cassill	Circle Sport	Chevrolet
34	David Ragan	Front Row Motorsports	Ford
35	Josh Wise (i)	Front Row Motorsports	Ford
36	J. J. Yeley	Tommy Baldwin Racing	Chevrolet
38	David Gilliland	Front Row Motorsports	Ford
39	Ryan Newman	Stewart–Haas Racing	Chevrolet
42	Juan Pablo Montoya	Earnhardt Ganassi Racing	Chevrolet
43	Aric Almirola	Richard Petty Motorsports	Ford
47	Bobby Labonte	JTG Daugherty Racing	Toyota
48	Jimmie Johnson	Hendrick Motorsports	Chevrolet
51	Regan Smith (i)	Phoenix Racing	Chevrolet
55	Mark Martin	Michael Waltrip Racing	Toyota
56	Martin Truex Jr.	Michael Waltrip Racing	Toyota
78	Kurt Busch	Furniture Row Racing	Chevrolet
81	Elliott Sadler (i)	Joe Gibbs Racing	Toyota
83	David Reutimann	BK Racing	Toyota
87	Joe Nemechek (i)	NEMCO-Jay Robinson Racing	Toyota
88	Dale Earnhardt Jr.	Hendrick Motorsports	Chevrolet
93	Travis Kvapil	BK Racing	Toyota
98	Michael McDowell	Phil Parsons Racing	Ford
99	Carl Edwards	Roush Fenway Racing	Ford
Official entry list

=== Practice and qualifying ===
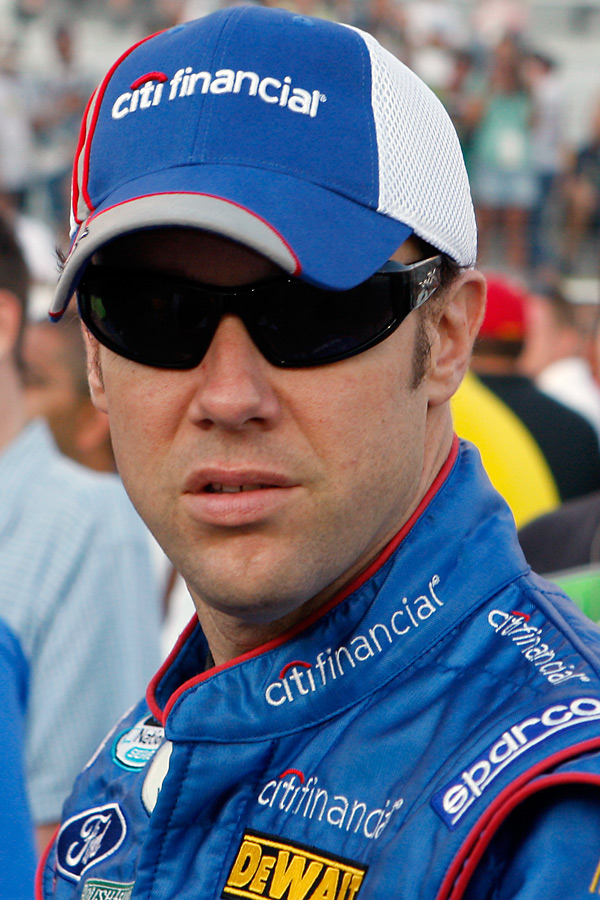
Matt Kenseth (shown here in 2009) won his ninth career pole position and also won the race.

Three practice sessions are scheduled to be held before the race. The first session, held on April 19, 2013, was 90 minutes long. The second and third were held on April 20, and were 55 and 50 minutes long, respectively. During the first practice session, Edwards was quickest with a time of 28.117 seconds, ahead of Ricky Stenhouse Jr. and Sam Hornish Jr. in second and third. Martin Truex Jr. followed in the fourth position, ahead of Aric Almirola in fifth.

During qualifying, forty-four cars were entered, meaning only one car was not able to start because of NASCAR's qualifying procedure. Kenseth clinched his ninth career pole position, with a record-setting time of 28.145 seconds. After his qualifying run, Kenseth commented, "We didn't think we had a chance. It's unexpected, and it's one of the fastest tracks of the year. Felt great to go out late and jump over the other guys." He was joined on the front row of the grid by Edwards. Stenhouse Jr. qualified third, Hornish Jr. took fourth, and Kyle Busch started fifth. Almirola, Truex Jr., Mark Martin, Ryan Newman, and Bowyer completed the first ten positions on the grid. The driver who failed to qualify for the race was Joe Nemechek.

In the Saturday morning session, Juan Pablo Montoya was quickest, ahead of Stenhouse Jr. and Almirola in second and third. Biffle and Edwards followed in the fourth and fifth positions. Truex Jr., Kyle Busch, Earnhardt Jr., Menard, and Newman rounded out the first ten positions. In the final practice session for the race, Kenseth was quickest with a time of 28.615 seconds. Almirola followed in second, ahead of Montoya and Kurt Busch in third and fourth. Kahne, who was twelfth quickest in second practice, managed fifth.

=== Race ===
==== Start ====
The race started at 1:16 p.m. EDT with Matt Kenseth leading the field to the green flag, The first caution came out on lap 6 when Kyle Busch spun out in the back straightaway, the race restarted on lap 9, The second caution came out on lap 39 when Dave Blaney blew an engine and collided into Danica Patrick, the race restarted on lap 43, A couple of laps later, the third caution then came out for debris on lap 75, the race restarted on lap 78, The fourth caution then came out on lap 87 when Elliott Sadler spun out, the race restarted on lap 91, with Matt Kenseth the race leader.

==== Second half ====
The fifth caution came out on lap 106 for a two-car wreck involving Kyle Busch and Joey Logano. The race restarted on lap 115 with Martin Truex Jr. the race leader, the sixth caution then came out on lap 174 when Brian Vickers spun out, the race restarted with 89 laps to go, The seventh caution came out for a multi-car wreck involving Marcos Ambrose, Casey Mears and Josh Wise, the race restarted with 81 laps to go, A couple of laps later, Debris on the back straightaway brought out the eighth caution of the day, with 50 laps to go, the race restarted with 43 laps to go with Matt Kenseth the race leader, Matt Kenseth won his race in Kansas.

== Results ==
=== Qualifying ===
Grid	No.	Driver	Team	Manufacturer	Time	Speed
1	20	Matt Kenseth	Joe Gibbs Racing	Toyota	28.145	191.864
2	99	Carl Edwards	Roush Fenway Racing	Ford	28.162	191.748
3	17	Ricky Stenhouse Jr.	Roush Fenway Racing	Ford	28.164	191.734
4	12	Sam Hornish Jr.	Penske Racing	Ford	28.213	191.401
5	18	Kyle Busch	Joe Gibbs Racing	Toyota	28.294	190.853
6	43	Aric Almirola	Richard Petty Motorsports	Ford	28.305	190.779
7	56	Martin Truex Jr.	Michael Waltrip Racing	Toyota	28.324	190.651
8	55	Mark Martin	Michael Waltrip Racing	Toyota	28.379	190.282
9	39	Ryan Newman	Stewart–Haas Racing	Chevrolet	28.388	190.221
10	15	Clint Bowyer	Michael Waltrip Racing	Toyota	28.401	190.134
11	16	Greg Biffle	Roush Fenway Racing	Ford	28.411	190.067
12	27	Paul Menard	Richard Childress Racing	Chevrolet	28.454	189.780
13	78	Kurt Busch	Furniture Row Racing	Chevrolet	28.491	189.534
14	1	Jamie McMurray	Earnhardt Ganassi Racing	Chevrolet	28.538	189.221
15	9	Marcos Ambrose	Richard Petty Motorsports	Ford	28.542	189.195
16	11	Brian Vickers	Joe Gibbs Racing	Toyota	28.544	189.182
17	29	Kevin Harvick	Richard Childress Racing	Chevrolet	28.548	189.155
18	14	Tony Stewart	Stewart–Haas Racing	Chevrolet	28.568	189.023
19	42	Juan Pablo Montoya	Earnhardt Ganassi Racing	Chevrolet	28.608	188.758
20	31	Jeff Burton	Richard Childress Racing	Chevrolet	28.620	188.679
21	48	Jimmie Johnson	Hendrick Motorsports	Chevrolet	28.656	188.442
22	22	Joey Logano	Penske Racing	Ford	28.675	188.317
23	88	Dale Earnhardt Jr.	Hendrick Motorsports	Chevrolet	28.676	188.311
24	81	Elliott Sadler	Joe Gibbs Racing	Toyota	28.724	187.996
25	10	Danica Patrick	Stewart–Haas Racing	Chevrolet	28.758	187.774
26	34	David Ragan	Front Row Motorsports	Ford	28.809	187.441
27	5	Kasey Kahne	Hendrick Motorsports	Chevrolet	28.820	187.370
28	38	David Gilliland	Front Row Motorsports	Ford	28.834	187.279
29	98	Michael McDowell	Phil Parsons Racing	Ford	28.835	187.272
30	13	Casey Mears	Germain Racing	Ford	28.889	186.922
31	83	David Reutimann	BK Racing	Toyota	28.891	186.909
32	93	Travis Kvapil	BK Racing	Toyota	28.919	186.728
33	2	Brad Keselowski	Penske Racing	Ford	28.930	186.657
34	47	Bobby Labonte	JTG Daugherty Racing	Toyota	28.945	186.561
35	19	Mike Bliss	Humphrey Smith Racing	Chevrolet	28.950	186.528
36	35	Josh Wise	Front Row Motorsports	Ford	28.967	186.419
37	32	Timmy Hill	FAS Lane Racing	Ford	29.081	185.688
38	30	David Stremme	Swan Racing	Toyota	29.087	185.650
39	33	Landon Cassill	Circle Sport	Chevrolet	29.146	185.274
40	36	J. J. Yeley	Tommy Baldwin Racing	Chevrolet	29.160	185.185
41	51	Regan Smith	Phoenix Racing	Chevrolet	29.218	184.818
42	7	Dave Blaney	Tommy Baldwin Racing	Chevrolet	29.378	183.811
43	24	Jeff Gordon	Hendrick Motorsports	Chevrolet	–	–
Failed to Qualify
	87	Joe Nemechek	NEMCO-Jay Robinson Racing	Toyota	29.046	185.912

1. Jeff Gordon collided into the SAFER barrier and failed to complete his qualifying lap.

=== Race results ===
Pos	Car	Driver	Team	Manufacturer	Laps	Points
1	20	Matt Kenseth	Joe Gibbs Racing	Toyota	267	48
2	5	Kasey Kahne	Hendrick Motorsports	Chevrolet	267	42
3	48	Jimmie Johnson	Hendrick Motorsports	Chevrolet	267	42
4	56	Martin Truex Jr.	Michael Waltrip Racing	Toyota	267	41
5	15	Clint Bowyer	Michael Waltrip Racing	Toyota	267	39
6	2	Brad Keselowski	Penske Racing	Ford	267	38
7	1	Jamie McMurray	Earnhardt Ganassi Racing	Chevrolet	267	37
8	43	Aric Almirola	Richard Petty Motorsports	Ford	267	36
9	55	Mark Martin	Michael Waltrip Racing	Toyota	267	35
10	27	Paul Menard	Richard Childress Racing	Chevrolet	267	34
11	17	Ricky Stenhouse Jr.	Roush Fenway Racing	Ford	267	34
12	29	Kevin Harvick	Richard Childress Racing	Chevrolet	267	32
13	24	Jeff Gordon	Hendrick Motorsports	Chevrolet	267	31
14	39	Ryan Newman	Stewart–Haas Racing	Chevrolet	267	31
15	78	Kurt Busch	Furniture Row Racing	Chevrolet	267	29
16	88	Dale Earnhardt Jr.	Hendrick Motorsports	Chevrolet	267	29
17	99	Carl Edwards	Roush Fenway Racing	Ford	267	28
18	31	Jeff Burton	Richard Childress Racing	Chevrolet	267	26
19	16	Greg Biffle	Roush Fenway Racing	Ford	267	25
20	9	Marcos Ambrose	Richard Petty Motorsports	Ford	267	24
21	14	Tony Stewart	Stewart–Haas Racing	Chevrolet	266	23
22	51	Regan Smith	Phoenix Racing	Chevrolet	266	–
23	38	David Gilliland	Front Row Motorsports	Ford	266	21
24	47	Bobby Labonte	JTG Daugherty Racing	Toyota	266	20
25	10	Danica Patrick	Stewart–Haas Racing	Chevrolet	265	19
26	35	Josh Wise	Front Row Motorsports	Ford	265	–
27	42	Juan Pablo Montoya	Earnhardt Ganassi Racing	Chevrolet	264	17
28	83	David Reutimann	BK Racing	Toyota	263	16
29	33	Landon Cassill	Circle Sport	Chevrolet	263	15
30	34	David Ragan	Front Row Motorsports	Ford	262	14
31	11	Brian Vickers	Joe Gibbs Racing	Toyota	257	–
32	30	David Stremme	Swan Racing	Toyota	256	13
33	32	Timmy Hill	FAS Lane Racing	Ford	242	11
34	13	Casey Mears	Germain Racing	Ford	216	10
35	36	J. J. Yeley	Tommy Baldwin Racing	Chevrolet	210	9
36	93	Travis Kvapil	BK Racing	Toyota	209	8
37	12	Sam Hornish Jr.	Penske Racing	Ford	181	–
38	18	Kyle Busch	Joe Gibbs Racing	Toyota	102	6
39	22	Joey Logano	Penske Racing	Ford	102	5
40	81	Elliott Sadler	Joe Gibbs Racing	Toyota	85	–
41	19	Mike Bliss	Humphrey Smith Motorsports	Toyota	65	–
42	98	Michael McDowell	Phil Parsons Racing	Ford	43	2
43	7	Dave Blaney	Tommy Baldwin Racing	Chevrolet	36	1

== Standings after the race ==
Drivers' Championship standings

	Pos	Driver	Points
	1	Jimmie Johnson	311
5	2	Kasey Kahne	274 (–37)
1	3	Brad Keselowski	273 (–38)
1	4	Greg Biffle	264 (–47)
1	5	Dale Earnhardt Jr.	263 (–48)

Manufacturers' Championship standings

Pos	Manufacturer	Points
1	Chevrolet	55
2	Toyota	53 (–2)
3	Ford	39 (–19)

- Note: Only the first twelve positions are included for the driver standings.

Previous race: 2013 NRA 500	Sprint Cup Series; 2013 season	Next race: 2013 Toyota Owners 400
