= 2013 Toyota Owners 400 =

Race details
- Race 9 of 36 in the 2013 NASCAR Sprint Cup Series
- Date: April 27, 2013
- Location: Richmond International Raceway in Richmond, Virginia, U.S.
- Course: Permanent racing facility
- Course length: 0.75 miles (1.20 km)
- Distance: 406 laps, 305 mi (483 km)
- Weather: Overcast with a high around 73 °F (23 °C); wind out of the SE at 5 miles per hour (8.0 km/h).
- Average speed: 92.141 mph (148.287 km/h)

Pole position
Driver	Matt Kenseth	Joe Gibbs Racing
- Time: 20.716 seconds

Most laps led
Driver	Matt Kenseth	Joe Gibbs Racing
- Laps: 140

Winner
No. 29	Kevin Harvick	Richard Childress Racing

Television in the United States
- Network: Fox
- Announcers: Mike Joy, Darrell Waltrip, Larry McReynolds
- Nielsen ratings: 3.7/7 (6.067 million viewers)

The 2013 Toyota Owners 400 was a NASCAR Sprint Cup Series stock car race that was held on April 27, 2013, at Richmond International Raceway in Richmond, Virginia, United States. Contested over 406 laps—extended from 400 laps due to a Green-white-checker finish on the 0.75-mile (1.20 km) D-shaped oval, it was the ninth race of the 2013 Sprint Cup Series championship. Kevin Harvick of Richard Childress Racing won the race, his first win of the 2013 season, while Clint Bowyer finished second. Joey Logano, Juan Pablo Montoya, and Jeff Burton rounded out the top five.

== Report ==
=== Background ===
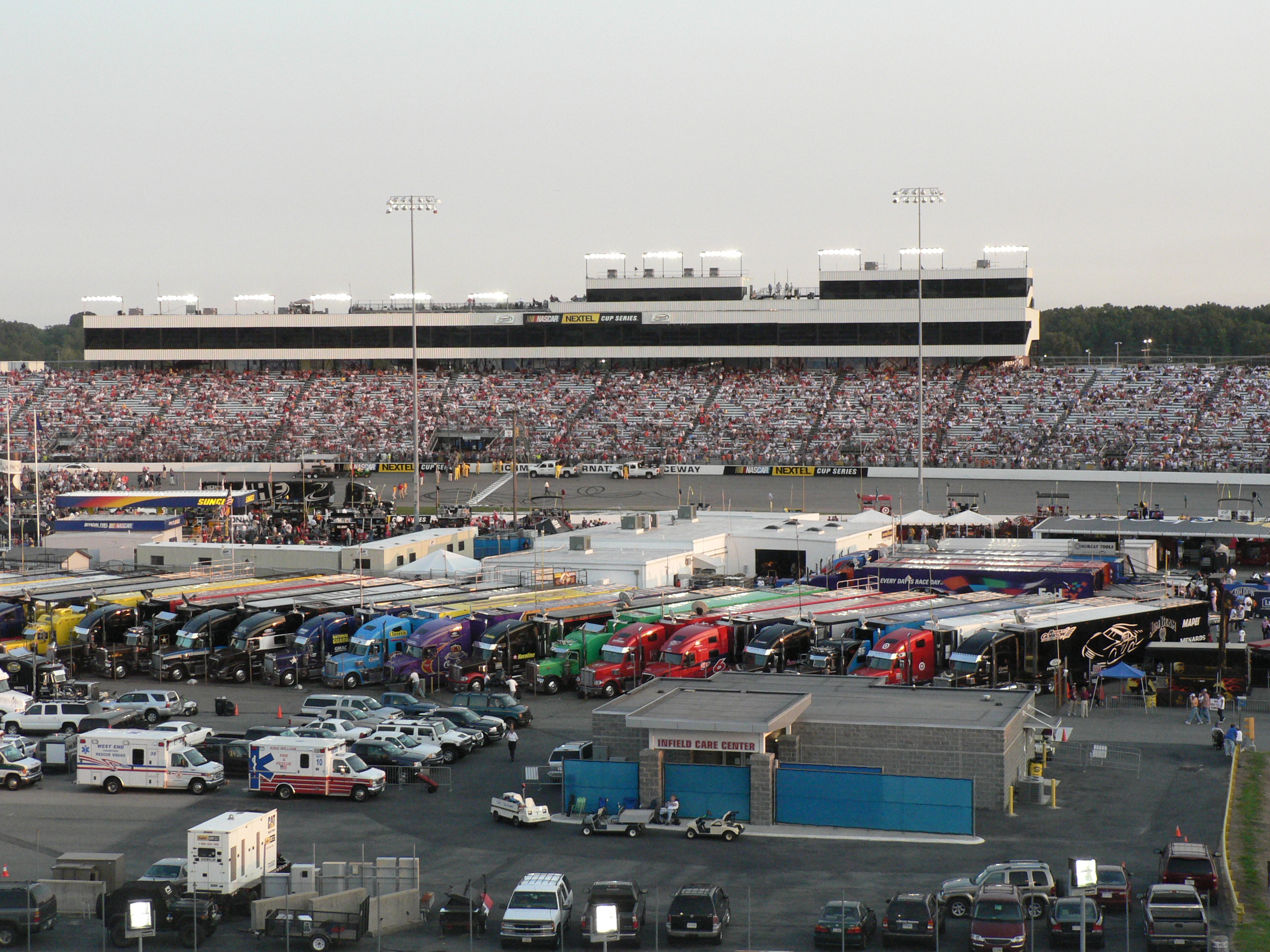
Richmond International Raceway, the race track where the race was held.

Richmond International Raceway is a four-turn D-shaped oval track that is 0.75 miles (1.21 km) long. The track's turns are banked at fourteen degrees, while the front stretch, the location of the finish line, is eight degrees. The back stretch, opposite of the front, is at only two degrees. The racetrack has a seating capacity for 94,063 spectators. Kyle Busch was the defending race winner after winning the event four consecutive times, most recently in 2012.

Before the race, Jimmie Johnson was leading the Drivers' Championship with 311 points, while Kasey Kahne stood in second with 274 points. Brad Keselowski followed in the third position, nine points ahead of Greg Biffle and ten ahead of Dale Earnhardt Jr. in fourth and fifth. Carl Edwards, with 262, was in sixth, five points ahead of Kyle Busch, Clint Bowyer was seven points ahead of Paul Menard and twenty ahead of Jamie McMurray in ninth and tenth, and 23 ahead of Kevin Harvick in eleventh. Aric Almirola completed the first twelve positions with 222 points.

=== Entry list ===
(R) - Denotes rookie driver.

(i) - Denotes driver who is ineligible for series driver points.

No.	Driver	Team	Manufacturer
1	Jamie McMurray	Earnhardt Ganassi Racing	Chevrolet
2	Brad Keselowski	Penske Racing	Ford
5	Kasey Kahne	Hendrick Motorsports	Chevrolet
7	Dave Blaney	Tommy Baldwin Racing	Chevrolet
9	Marcos Ambrose	Richard Petty Motorsports	Ford
10	Danica Patrick (R)	Stewart–Haas Racing	Chevrolet
11	Brian Vickers (i)	Joe Gibbs Racing	Toyota
13	Casey Mears	Germain Racing	Ford
14	Tony Stewart	Stewart–Haas Racing	Chevrolet
15	Clint Bowyer	Michael Waltrip Racing	Toyota
16	Greg Biffle	Roush Fenway Racing	Ford
17	Ricky Stenhouse Jr. (R)	Roush Fenway Racing	Ford
18	Kyle Busch	Joe Gibbs Racing	Toyota
19	Mike Bliss (i)	Humphrey Smith Racing	Toyota
20	Matt Kenseth	Joe Gibbs Racing	Toyota
22	Joey Logano	Penske Racing	Ford
24	Jeff Gordon	Hendrick Motorsports	Chevrolet
27	Paul Menard	Richard Childress Racing	Chevrolet
29	Kevin Harvick	Richard Childress Racing	Chevrolet
30	David Stremme	Swan Racing	Toyota
31	Jeff Burton	Richard Childress Racing	Chevrolet
32	Timmy Hill (R)	FAS Lane Racing	Ford
33	Landon Cassill	Circle Sport	Chevrolet
34	David Ragan	Front Row Motorsports	Ford
35	Josh Wise (i)	Front Row Motorsports	Ford
36	J. J. Yeley	Tommy Baldwin Racing	Chevrolet
38	David Gilliland	Front Row Motorsports	Ford
39	Ryan Newman	Stewart–Haas Racing	Chevrolet
42	Juan Pablo Montoya	Earnhardt Ganassi Racing	Chevrolet
43	Aric Almirola	Richard Petty Motorsports	Ford
47	Bobby Labonte	JTG Daugherty Racing	Toyota
48	Jimmie Johnson	Hendrick Motorsports	Chevrolet
51	A. J. Allmendinger	Phoenix Racing	Chevrolet
52	Brian Keselowski	Brian Keselowski Motorsports	Toyota
55	Mark Martin	Michael Waltrip Racing	Toyota
56	Martin Truex Jr.	Michael Waltrip Racing	Toyota
78	Kurt Busch	Furniture Row Racing	Chevrolet
83	David Reutimann	BK Racing	Toyota
87	Joe Nemechek (i)	NEMCO-Jay Robinson Racing	Toyota
88	Dale Earnhardt Jr.	Hendrick Motorsports	Chevrolet
93	Travis Kvapil	BK Racing	Toyota
98	Michael McDowell	Phil Parsons Racing	Ford
99	Carl Edwards	Roush Fenway Racing	Ford
Official entry list

=== Practice and qualifying ===
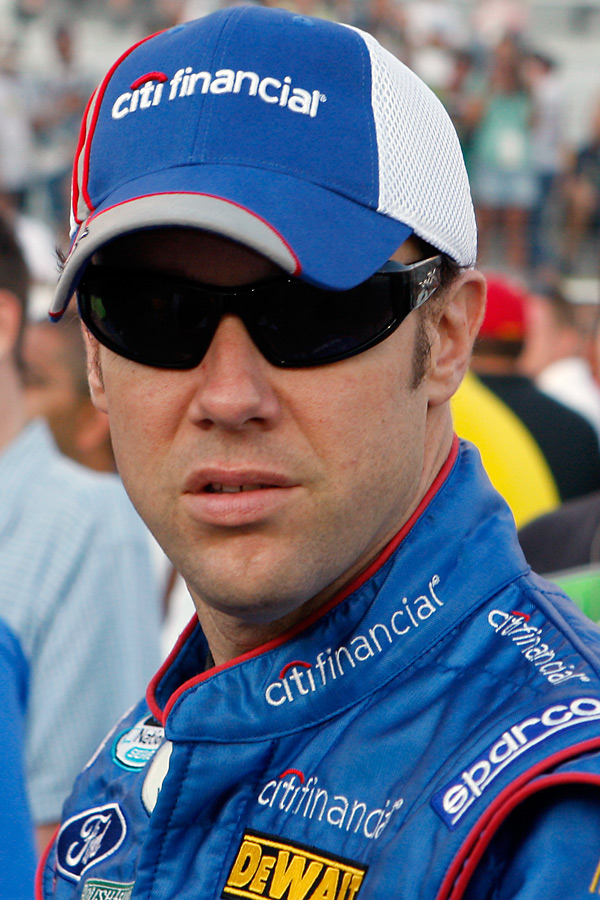
Matt Kenseth (shown here in 2009) won his tenth career pole position

Two practice sessions were held in preparation for the race; both on Friday, April 26, 2013. The first session lasted for 120 minutes, while second session was 60 minutes long. During the first practice session, Mark Martin, for the Michael Waltrip Racing team, was quickest ahead of Keselowski in second and Kyle Busch in third. Matt Kenseth was scored fourth, and Brian Vickers managed fifth. Harvick, Edwards, Kurt Busch, Bowyer, and Juan Pablo Montoya rounded out the top ten quickest drivers in the session.

Jeff Gordon was quickest in the second and final practice session, ahead of Montoya in second and Vickers in third. Menard was fourth quickest, and McMurray took fifth. A. J. Allmendinger, Martin Truex Jr., Jeff Burton, Earnhardt Jr., and Edwards followed in the top ten.

During qualifying, forty-three cars were entered. Kenseth clinched his second pole position of the season, with a time of 20.716 seconds. After his qualifying run, Kenseth commented, “It feels great. It’s a great race track. I felt like we were off a little in practice today, and (crew chief) Jason Ratcliff and that whole group there did the things they do for me every week and just made great adjustments. I thought we hit it pretty good there in that lap, had great speed. Thanks to Dollar General, Husky, Home Depot (Kenseth’s sponsors) for sticking with us through all this stuff this week. We’ll get through this ... glad to be on the pole, and looking forward to tomorrow night.” He was joined on the front row of the grid by Vickers. Gordon qualified third, Kahne took fourth, and Bowyer started fifth. Montoya, Joey Logano, Kyle Busch, Truex Jr., and Mark Martin completed the first ten positions on the grid.

== Results ==
=== Qualifying ===
Grid	No.	Driver	Team	Manufacturer	Time	Speed
1	20	Matt Kenseth	Joe Gibbs Racing	Toyota	20.716	130.334
2	11	Brian Vickers	Joe Gibbs Racing	Toyota	20.721	130.303
3	24	Jeff Gordon	Hendrick Motorsports	Chevrolet	20.729	130.252
4	5	Kasey Kahne	Hendrick Motorsports	Chevrolet	20.740	130.183
5	15	Clint Bowyer	Michael Waltrip Racing	Toyota	20.744	130.158
6	42	Juan Pablo Montoya	Earnhardt Ganassi Racing	Chevrolet	20.793	129.851
7	22	Joey Logano	Penske Racing	Ford	20.808	129.758
8	18	Kyle Busch	Joe Gibbs Racing	Toyota	20.828	129.633
9	56	Martin Truex Jr.	Michael Waltrip Racing	Toyota	20.834	129.596
10	55	Mark Martin	Michael Waltrip Racing	Toyota	20.837	129.577
11	9	Marcos Ambrose	Richard Petty Motorsports	Ford	20.839	129.565
12	17	Ricky Stenhouse Jr.	Roush Fenway Racing	Ford	20.841	129.552
13	1	Jamie McMurray	Earnhardt Ganassi Racing	Chevrolet	20.844	129.534
14	78	Kurt Busch	Furniture Row Racing	Chevrolet	20.862	129.422
15	39	Ryan Newman	Stewart–Haas Racing	Chevrolet	20.868	129.385
16	31	Jeff Burton	Richard Childress Racing	Chevrolet	20.870	129.372
17	29	Kevin Harvick	Richard Childress Racing	Chevrolet	20.871	129.366
18	7	Dave Blaney	Tommy Baldwin Racing	Chevrolet	20.883	129.292
19	88	Dale Earnhardt Jr.	Hendrick Motorsports	Chevrolet	20.900	129.187
20	34	David Ragan	Front Row Motorsports	Ford	20.904	129.162
21	14	Tony Stewart	Stewart–Haas Racing	Chevrolet	20.912	129.112
22	83	David Reutimann	BK Racing	Toyota	20.912	129.112
23	2	Brad Keselowski	Penske Racing	Ford	20.925	129.032
24	51	A. J. Allmendinger	Phoenix Racing	Chevrolet	20.944	128.915
25	30	David Stremme	Swan Racing	Toyota	20.961	128.811
26	48	Jimmie Johnson	Hendrick Motorsports	Chevrolet	20.966	128.780
27	35	Josh Wise	Front Row Motorsports	Ford	20.972	128.743
28	99	Carl Edwards	Roush Fenway Racing	Ford	20.975	128.725
29	27	Paul Menard	Richard Childress Racing	Chevrolet	20.976	128.719
30	10	Danica Patrick	Stewart–Haas Racing	Chevrolet	20.979	128.700
31	33	Landon Cassill	Circle Sport	Chevrolet	20.982	128.682
32	47	Bobby Labonte	JTG Daugherty Racing	Toyota	20.994	128.608
33	16	Greg Biffle	Roush Fenway Racing	Ford	21.009	128.516
34	43	Aric Almirola	Richard Petty Motorsports	Ford	21.036	128.351
35	98	Michael McDowell	Phil Parsons Racing	Ford	21.085	128.053
36	93	Travis Kvapil	BK Racing	Toyota	21.101	127.956
37	38	David Gilliland	Front Row Motorsports	Ford	21.113	127.883
38	19	Mike Bliss	Humphrey Smith Motorsports	Toyota	21.179	127.485
39	36	J. J. Yeley	Tommy Baldwin Racing	Chevrolet	21.336	126.547
40	13	Casey Mears	Germain Racing	Ford	21.360	126.404
41	87	Joe Nemechek	NEMCO-Jay Robinson Racing	Toyota	21.448	125.886
42	32	Timmy Hill	FAS Lane Racing	Ford	21.481	125.692
43	52	Brian Keselowski	Hamilton Means Racing	Ford	21.818	123.751

=== Race results ===
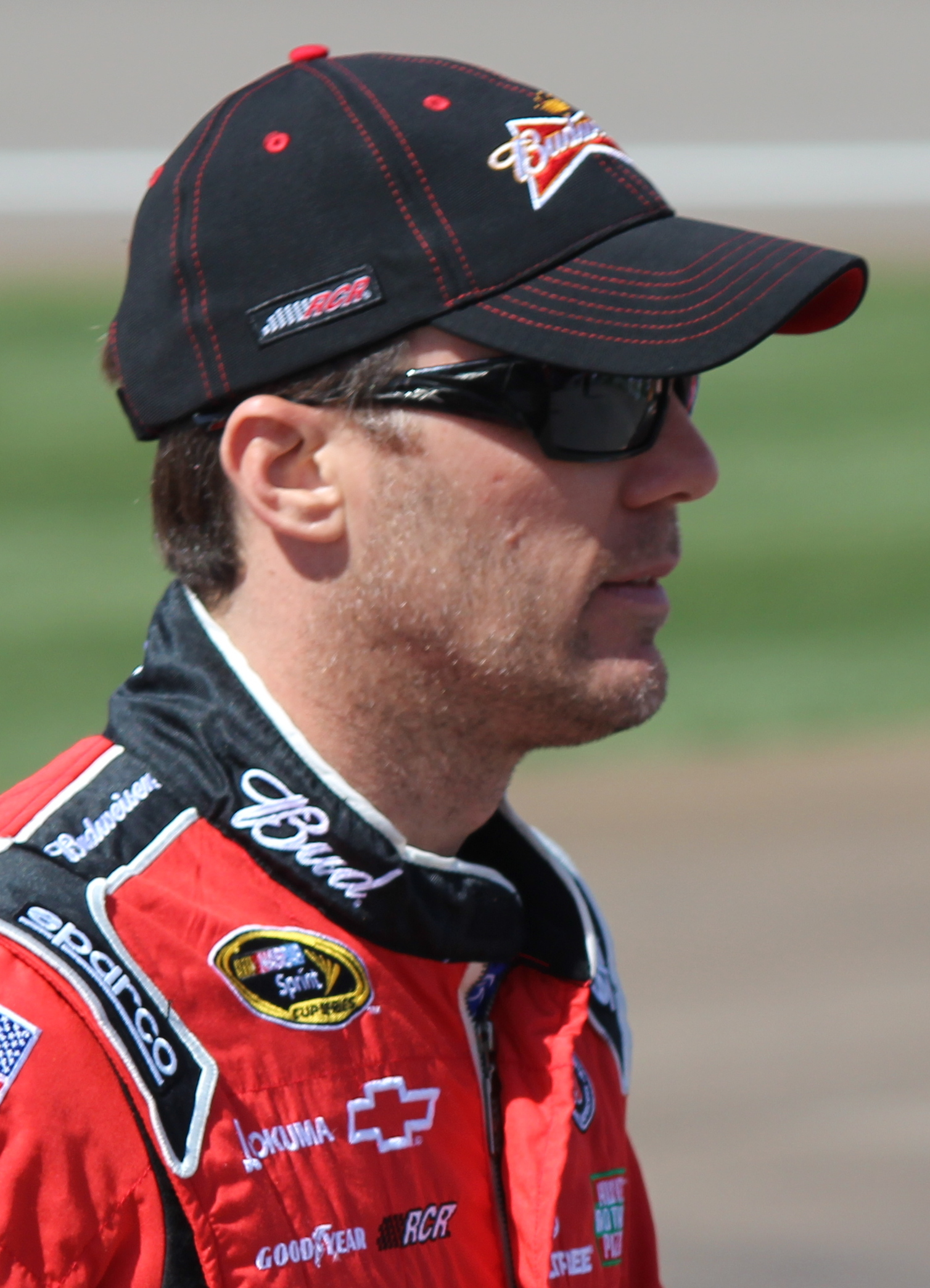
Kevin Harvick won the race.

Pos	Car	Driver	Team	Manufacturer	Laps	Points
1	29	Kevin Harvick	Richard Childress Racing	Chevrolet	406	47
2	15	Clint Bowyer	Michael Waltrip Racing	Toyota	406	43
3	22	Joey Logano	Penske Racing	Ford	406	41
4	42	Juan Pablo Montoya	Earnhardt Ganassi Racing	Chevrolet	406	41
5	31	Jeff Burton	Richard Childress Racing	Chevrolet	406	40
6	99	Carl Edwards	Roush Fenway Racing	Ford	406	38
7	20	Matt Kenseth	Joe Gibbs Racing	Toyota	406	39
8	43	Aric Almirola	Richard Petty Motorsports	Ford	406	36
9	78	Kurt Busch	Furniture Row Racing	Chevrolet	406	36
10	88	Dale Earnhardt Jr.	Hendrick Motorsports	Chevrolet	406	34
11	24	Jeff Gordon	Hendrick Motorsports	Chevrolet	406	33
12	48	Jimmie Johnson	Hendrick Motorsports	Chevrolet	406	32
13	27	Paul Menard	Richard Childress Racing	Chevrolet	406	31
14	51	A. J. Allmendinger	Phoenix Racing	Chevrolet	406	30
15	39	Ryan Newman	Stewart–Haas Racing	Chevrolet	406	29
16	17	Ricky Stenhouse Jr.	Roush Fenway Racing	Ford	406	28
17	56	Martin Truex Jr.	Michael Waltrip Racing	Toyota	406	27
18	14	Tony Stewart	Stewart–Haas Racing	Chevrolet	406	26
19	47	Bobby Labonte	JTG Daugherty Racing	Toyota	406	25
20	34	David Ragan	Front Row Motorsports	Ford	406	24
21	5	Kasey Kahne	Hendrick Motorsports	Chevrolet	406	23
22	83	David Reutimann	BK Racing	Toyota	406	22
23	7	Dave Blaney	Tommy Baldwin Racing	Chevrolet	406	21
24	18	Kyle Busch	Joe Gibbs Racing	Toyota	406	21
25	33	Landon Cassill	Circle Sport	Chevrolet	406	19
26	1	Jamie McMurray	Earnhardt Ganassi Racing	Chevrolet	406	18
27	38	David Gilliland	Front Row Motorsports	Ford	405	17
28	35	Josh Wise	Front Row Motorsports	Ford	404	–
29	10	Danica Patrick	Stewart–Haas Racing	Chevrolet	402	15
30	13	Casey Mears	Germain Racing	Ford	402	14
31	30	David Stremme	Swan Racing	Toyota	402	13
32	36	J. J. Yeley	Tommy Baldwin Racing	Chevrolet	401	12
33	2	Brad Keselowski	Penske Racing	Ford	398	11
34	32	Timmy Hill	FAS Lane Racing	Ford	397	10
35	11	Brian Vickers	Joe Gibbs Racing	Toyota	392	–
36	16	Greg Biffle	Roush Fenway Racing	Ford	391	8
37	93	Travis Kvapil	BK Racing	Toyota	368	7
38	55	Mark Martin	Michael Waltrip Racing	Toyota	349	6
39	87	Joe Nemechek	NEMCO-Jay Robinson Racing	Toyota	245	–
40	52	Brian Keselowski	Hamilton Means Racing	Ford	186	4
41	98	Michael McDowell	Phil Parsons Racing	Ford	121	3
42	9	Marcos Ambrose	Richard Petty Motorsports	Ford	109	2
43	19	Mike Bliss	Humphrey Smith Motorsports	Toyota	17	–

== Standings after the race ==
Drivers' Championship standings

	Pos	Driver	Points
	1	Jimmie Johnson	343
4	2	Carl Edwards	300 (–43)
1	3	Kasey Kahne	297 (–46)
1	4	Dale Earnhardt Jr.	297 (–46)
3	5	Clint Bowyer	290 (–53)

Manufacturers' Championship standings

Pos	Manufacturer	Points
1	Chevrolet	64
2	Toyota	59 (–5)
3	Ford	43 (–21)

- Note: Only the first twelve positions are included for the driver standings.

Previous race: 2013 STP 400	Sprint Cup Series; 2013 season	Next race: 2013 Aaron's 499
