= David Stremme =

American racing driver (born 1977)

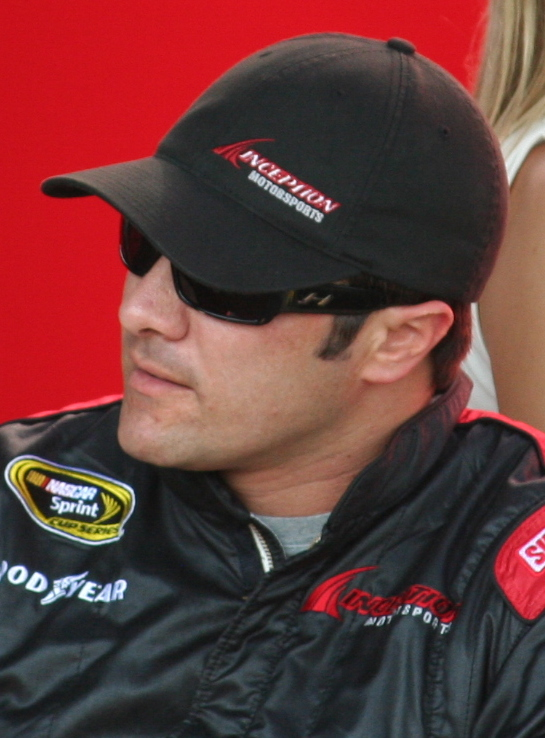
- Stremme in 2011
- Born: June 19, 1977 (age 49); South Bend, Indiana, U.S.
- Achievements: 2020 World Short Track Championship UMP Modified Winner; 2008 Winchester 400 Winner
- Awards: 2002 ASA National Tour Rookie of the Year; 2003 NASCAR Busch Series Rookie of the Year

NASCAR Cup Series career
- 200 races run over 9 years
- 2014 position: 43rd
- Best finish: 24th (2007)
- First race: 2005 USG Sheetrock 400 (Chicago)
- Last race: 2014 AAA 400 (Dover)
Wins	Top tens	Poles
0	3	0

NASCAR O'Reilly Auto Parts Series career
- 146 races run over 7 years
- 2011 position: 112th
- Best finish: 10th (2004)
- First race: 2003 Pepsi 300 (Nashville)
- Last race: 2011 Ford 300 (Homestead)
Wins	Top tens	Poles
0	50	2

NASCAR FedEx Freight Truck Series career
- 4 races run over 3 years
- Best finish: 56th (2008)
- First race: 2006 Kroger 250 (Martinsville)
- Last race: 2011 Fast Five 225 (Chicagoland)
Wins	Top tens	Poles
0	1	0
- Statistics up to date as of September 28, 2014.

David Andrew Stremme (born June 19, 1977) is an American professional stock car racing driver and race car builder.

== Early career ==
Stremme was born in South Bend, Indiana. His racing roots can be traced back to Midwestern short track racing, where he followed in the footsteps originally cast by his great-uncle in the 1950s. Stremme's father, mother, and brother also raced before him. His first stock car victory came in the early 1990s at New Paris Speedway, behind the wheel of his mother's street stock ride. Once track officials realized that he was only fifteen years old however, he was forced to temporarily give up driving.

Once he reached legal driving age, Stremme returned to the Midwestern short track scene. During his career, he earned 24 feature wins, two Rookie of the Year titles and two track championships in just four years. From the local tracks, Stremme became a winner in the Kendall Late Model Series and soon joined American Speed Association (ASA), where he was named the 2002 ASA Rookie of the Year.

During 1998, 1999, and 2000, Stremme raced for ISES Performance Group, Inc. The team was made up of Stremme's racing friends and sponsored by Industrial Safety and Environmental Services, Inc. The team purchased new cars, and Stremme initiated alliances with top suppliers of engines, chassis, and shock manufacturers. Stremme's experience building race cars gave him a greater understanding of their performance, which proved an advantage for a young racer.

In his first start in a Kendall Late Model Series car, at Winchester Speedway, Stremme set a new track record and finished fourth behind the wheel of a car he had assembled himself. Subsequent to this event, Stremme and his ISES team set forth an even larger strategy. Under the direction of ISES, Inc. President Tris Gour, the team purchased a new car to compete in the NASCAR November Phoenix International Raceway race. The new car was completely built by Stremme with help from friends. It was the first time the team had ventured significantly far away from home.

As a budget did not allow for crew chiefs or fabricators, Gour and Stremme formed an alliance with Robert Hamke. Hamke is a well renowned chassis builder, racer, and crew chief. Although the car built was not a Hamke Chassis, Hamke accepted the opportunity to work with Stremme and the crew, and accepted the challenge based upon reference from Performance Technologies (engine builders) and the owner of LeftHander Chassis. Hamke had a great respect for the owner of LeftHander. In addition, Performance Technologies had built several engines for both chassis builders (Hamke and Lefthander) clients.

While at Phoenix, the team qualified fourth and led several laps during the race. Stremme led the majority of the race and was passed on the last lap coming out of turn three by Scott Hansen. Subsequent to the race, it was found that Hansen was disqualified as his car was equipped with an illegal carburetor spacer plate giving him an unfair horsepower advantage.

The local news media reported on this issue but only a financial penalty was given to Hansen. Although upset by the loss, the ISES Performance Group, Inc. and Stremme had gained the respect of the Hansen Group. Hansen later called upon Stremme to race his car at Winchester due to a conflict with his racing schedule.

== NASCAR career ==
=== 2003–2005 ===
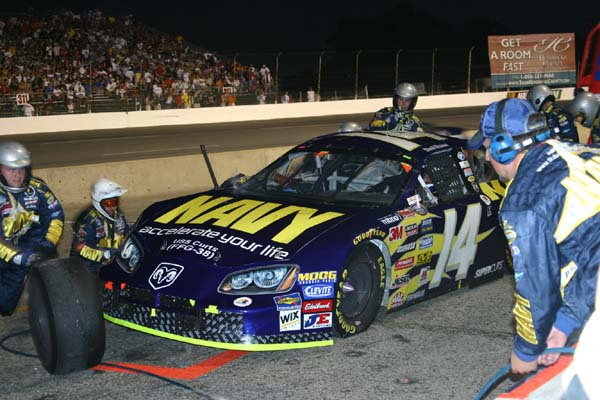
Stremme pits the No. 14 Dodge during the 2005 Kroger 200.

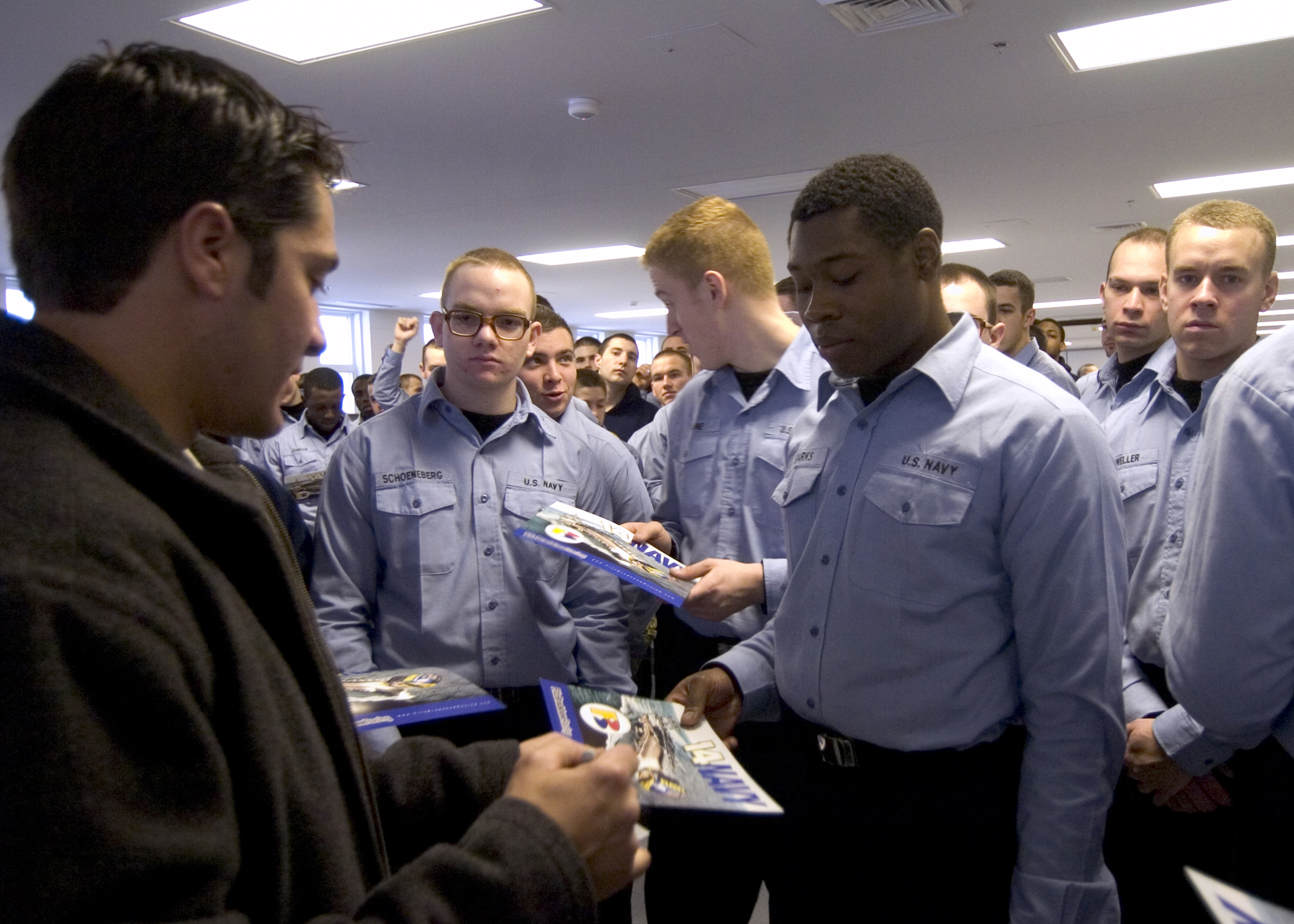
Stremme at an event in 2005 signing hero cards with members of the U.S. Navy, his sponsor at the time

After signing a driver development contract with Chip Ganassi Racing, Stremme started fifteenth in his Busch Series debut at Nashville Superspeedway in April 2003, driving the No. 1 Dodge for Phoenix Racing, and finished 7th in the race. He finished 14th in both of his next two starts, before coming to sixth at Nazareth Speedway. He led 32 laps in that race, which were the first in his career.

Stremme finished 4th after starting third at Nashville in June, and duplicated the result at the Milwaukee Mile. He had a 10th at Kentucky and a 9th at Memphis. Stremme's worst finish that year was a 31st at Dover. Due to a contract obligation, Finch had Jamie McMurray back in the car for the final two races, and Stremme moved to Braun Racing for the remaining two races. Stremme led 48 laps at Rockingham, finishing 5th, and additionally drove the No. 30 Sport Clips Dodge home in 14th. His strong finishes in his part-time schedule was enough to secure him the 2003 Busch Series Rookie of the Year award, despite competing in only 18 of the 34 races.

Stremme raced in the No. 32 TrimSpa Dodge Intrepid in 2004. Stremme started 4th and finished 6th in the season opener at Daytona International Speedway. Despite winning his first career pole at Milwaukee, and finishing that up with a 2nd, Stremme's team began to run mid-pack with a handful of top-tens mixed in. Braun Racing then made the announcement that they were going to replace Stremme with Shane Hmiel, who was just coming off a suspension. Ganassi then made a deal with FitzBradshaw Racing to secure Stremme a ride. For the remainder of the 2004 season, Stremme was to replace Casey Atwood in FitzBradshaw's U.S. Navy No. 14 Chevrolet. For the next season, FitzBradshaw's team would begin running Dodges and Stremme would be retained to drive the No. 14 full-time. In 2005, Stremme posted five top-five finishes and finishing 13th in points, when it was announced he would run full-time in the Nextel Cup Series.

=== 2006–2007 ===
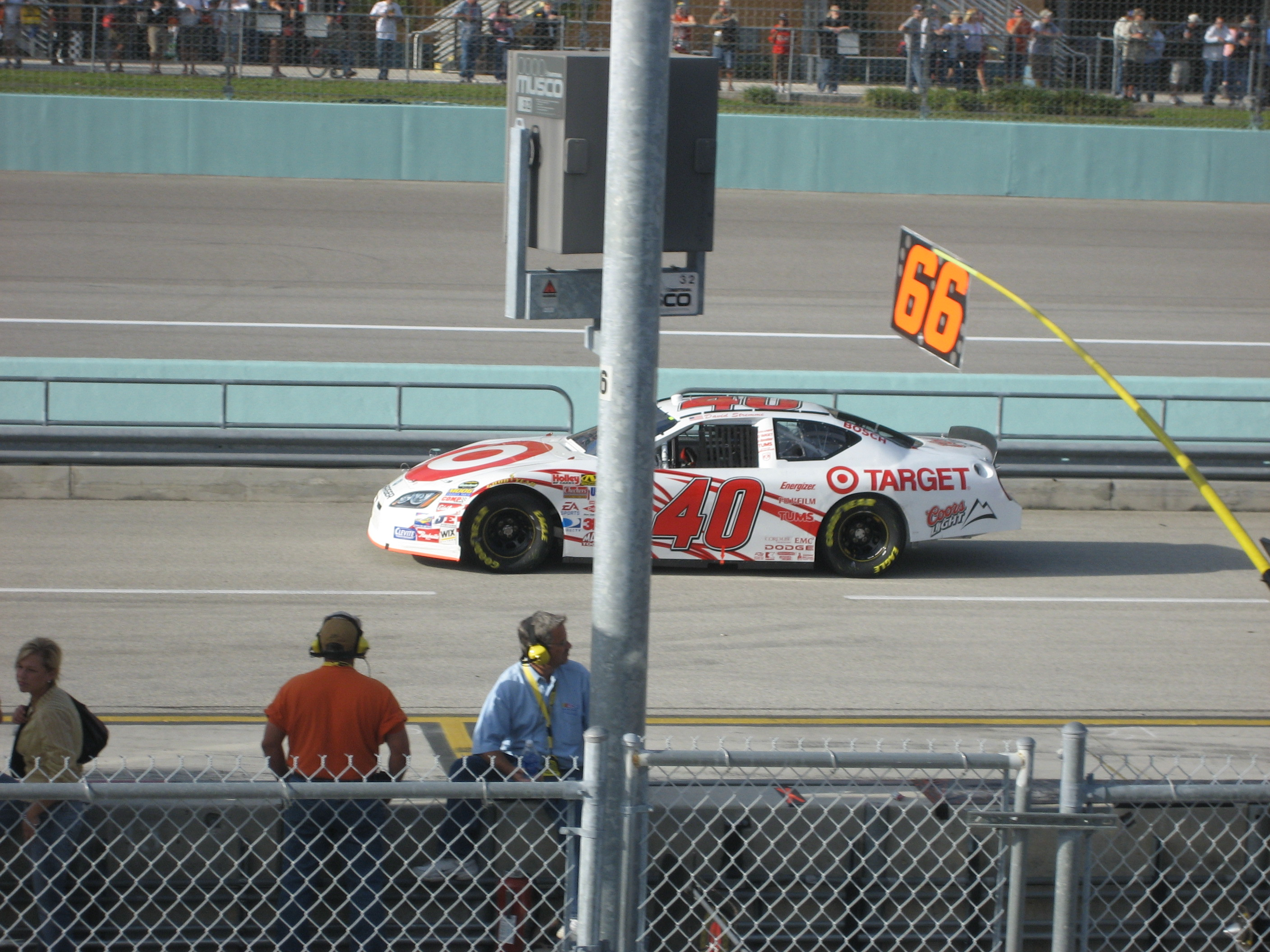
David Stremme practicing for the 2007 Ford 400 at the Homestead-Miami Speedway.

In June 2005, Stremme made his Cup debut in 2005 driving Ganassi's R&D No. 39 Navy Dodge at Chicagoland Speedway. He started 31st and would finish 16th in his debut. He also had finishes of 42nd at Richmond and Miami, and a 36th at Charlotte. Ganassi announced Stremme would go to the Cup series, driving the No. 40 Coors Light Dodge in 2006.

In 2006, Stremme had a best finish of 11th at New Hampshire International Speedway and Homestead-Miami Speedway. He finished 33rd in points after missing both road course races that season. In addition, he made his Craftsman Truck Series debut at Martinsville Speedway, finishing 32nd in the No. 04 Dodge for Bobby Hamilton Racing. In addition, he won his first career ARCA RE/MAX Series race at Michigan International Speedway, driving the No. 61 Hantz Group Dodge for Rusty Wallace. Despite solid equipment with Ganassi, Stremme failed to notch a single top-ten in 34 races.

Stremme followed up his disastrous rookie season with another poor season in 2007. He started 2007 starting sixth in the Daytona 500 and went on to finish 11th. Three weeks later he would get his best career start, 2nd in the UAW-DaimlerChrysler 400 at Las Vegas Motor Speedway. In the Samsung 500 at Texas Motor Speedway he would get his first career top-ten finish. Two weeks later, he would follow that up with a career best finish, 8th in the Aaron's 499 at Talladega Superspeedway. During that season, Stremme shared driving duties of the No. 41 Wrigley Dodge Charger in the Busch Series with Ganassi teammate Reed Sorenson. It ran numerous paint schemes including Wrigley's Spearmint, Doublemint, Juicy Fruit, and Winterfresh. He was able to get his second career Busch pole at Nashville but ended up 11th in the race. In addition, he drove a part-time schedule in the No. 22 Supercuts Dodge for Fitz Motorsports.

=== 2008–2012 ===
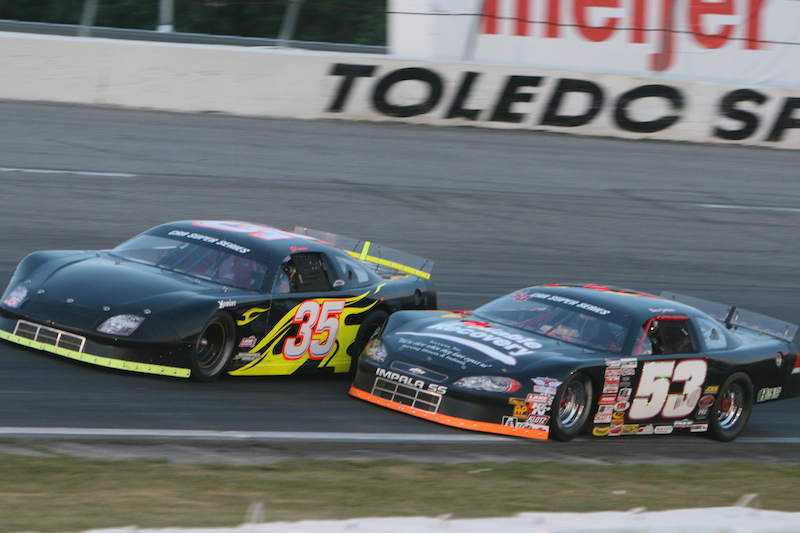
Stremme (No. 35) races Boris Jurkovic in a CRA Super Series race in 2008

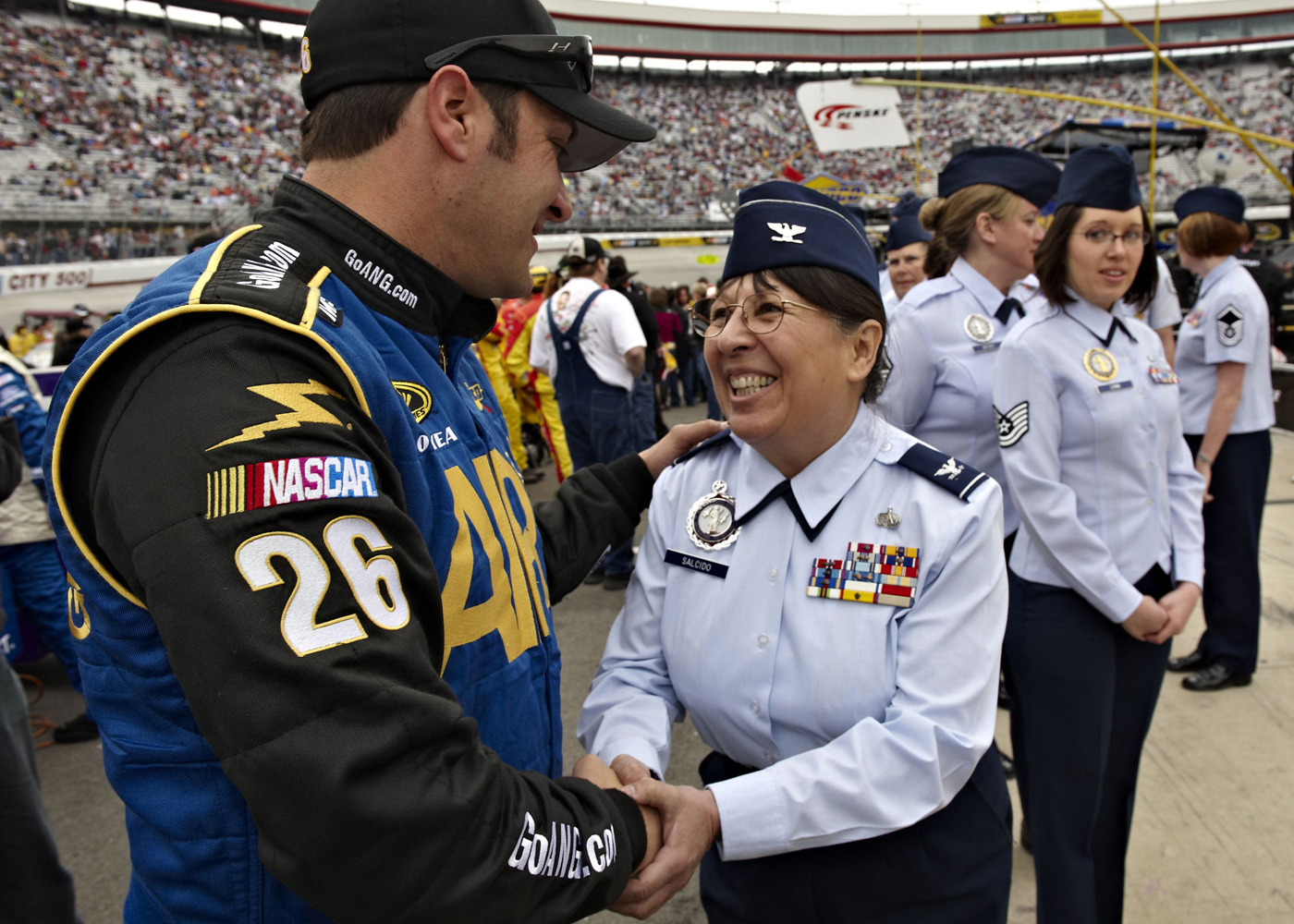
Stremme shaking hands with a member of the Air National Guard at Bristol in 2010, his sponsor that year.

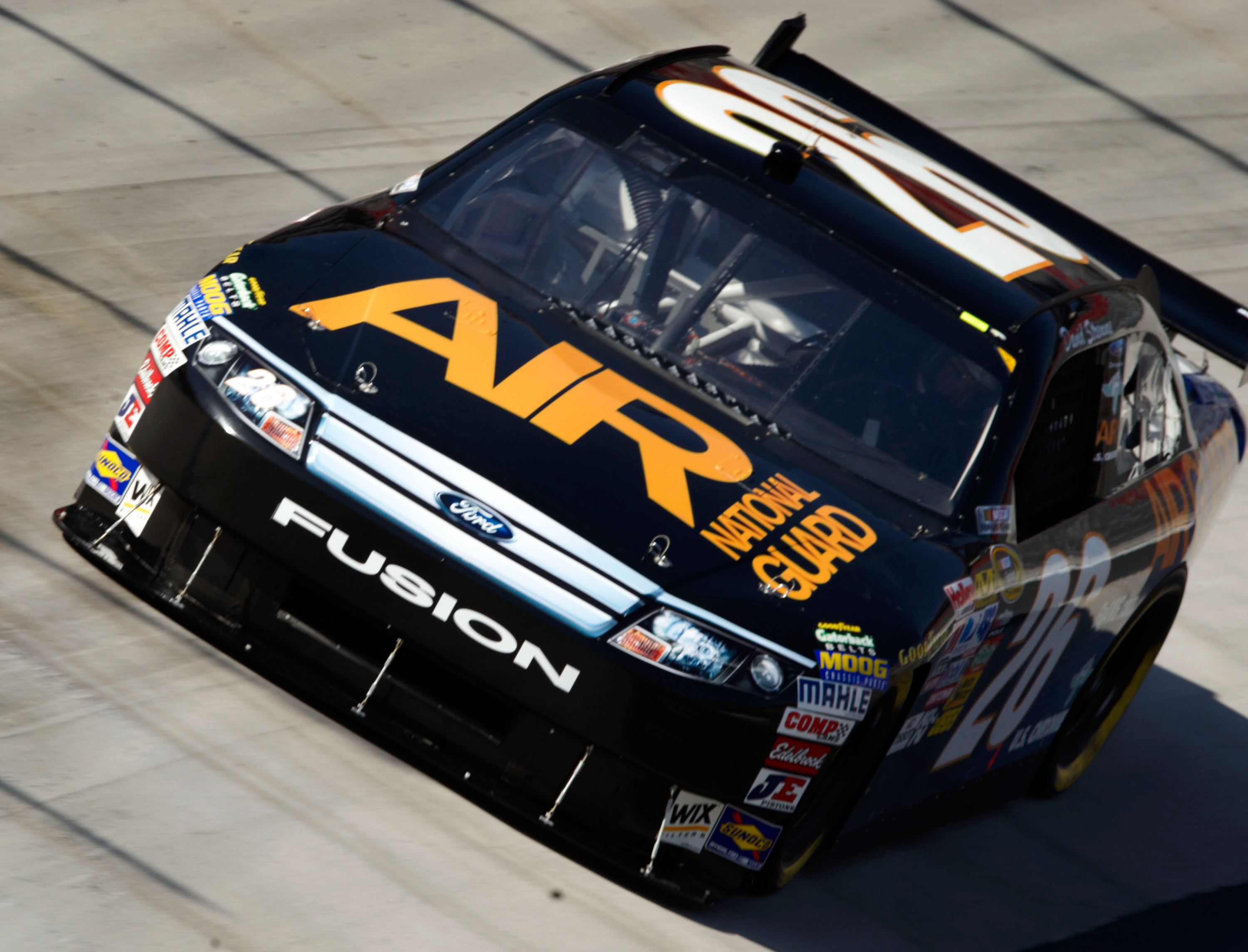
Stremme's 2010 Cup car at Bristol in March

He was replaced in the No. 40 Dodge by Dario Franchitti in 2008 after the 2007 Indianapolis 500 Champion was signed to drive in Sprint Cup. Stremme returned to the Nationwide Series driving for Rusty Wallace Racing, in the No. 64 Atreus Homes & Communities Chevrolet. He was originally scheduled to run a handful of races, with Chase Austin and Max Papis driving the rest of the year, but after starting the season in the top-fifteen in points, the schedule was modified to allow him to run every race except the road course events. He had five top-fives and sixteen top-tens, on his way to an 11th-place points finish. In the latter portion of the year, Atreus left the team, and AVIS, Loan Star Title Loans, and the Penske Corporation became the team's new primary sponsors. He drove the No. 15 Hyprene Ergon Toyota Tundra in two Truck races that season as well, in addition to returning to the No. 40 Sprint Cup team, filling for the injured Franchitti at Talladega.

In 2009, Stremme signed to drive the No. 12 car for Penske Racing full-time in the Sprint Cup Series, replacing Ryan Newman who moved to the No. 39 car for Stewart Haas Racing. The team lost its sponsor when Verizon Wireless bought Alltel, thus negating the grandfather clause. The car was blanked similar to the Penske used in the IRL, censoring their Phillip Morris USA sponsorship with "Team Penske". Stremme nearly won the 2009 AMP Energy 500 running near the front for the lead, but a green-white checkered ruined his day, causing him to run out of gas. Throughout Stremme's season for Penske, he did not score a single top 10. Stremme was released from the contract with Penske on November 3, because their new driver for 2010, Brad Keselowski, was finished with his prior contract agreements with Hendrick Motorsports. He missed the Texas and Phoenix races and failed to qualify for the Homestead race driving for James Finch in the No. 09 car.

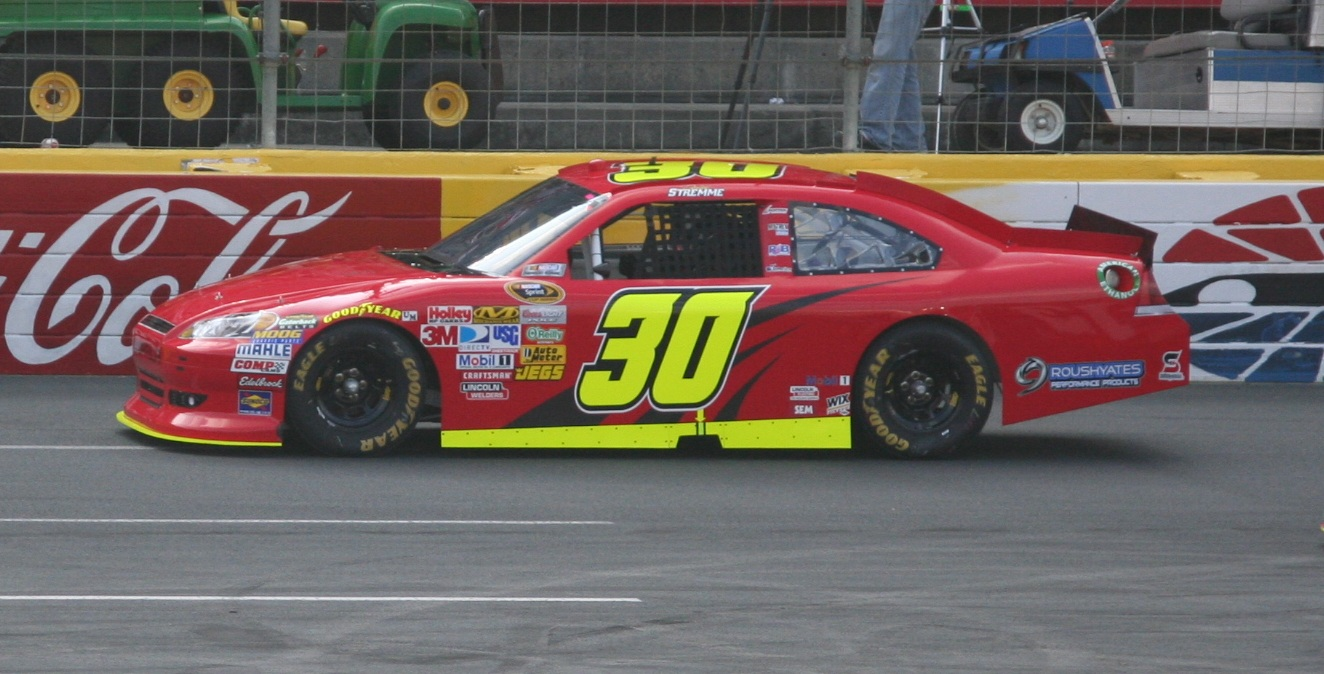
Stremme's 2011 Cup car at Charlotte

Stremme attempted sixteen races with Latitude 43 Motorsports in 2010, failing to make five. Stremme attempted a select number of races with newly formed Inception Motorsports in the No. 30 Chevrolet in 2011, along with a limited Nationwide Series schedule with ML Motorsports. He ran in the Sprint Cup Series for 2012 with Inception Motorsports, switching to Toyotas.

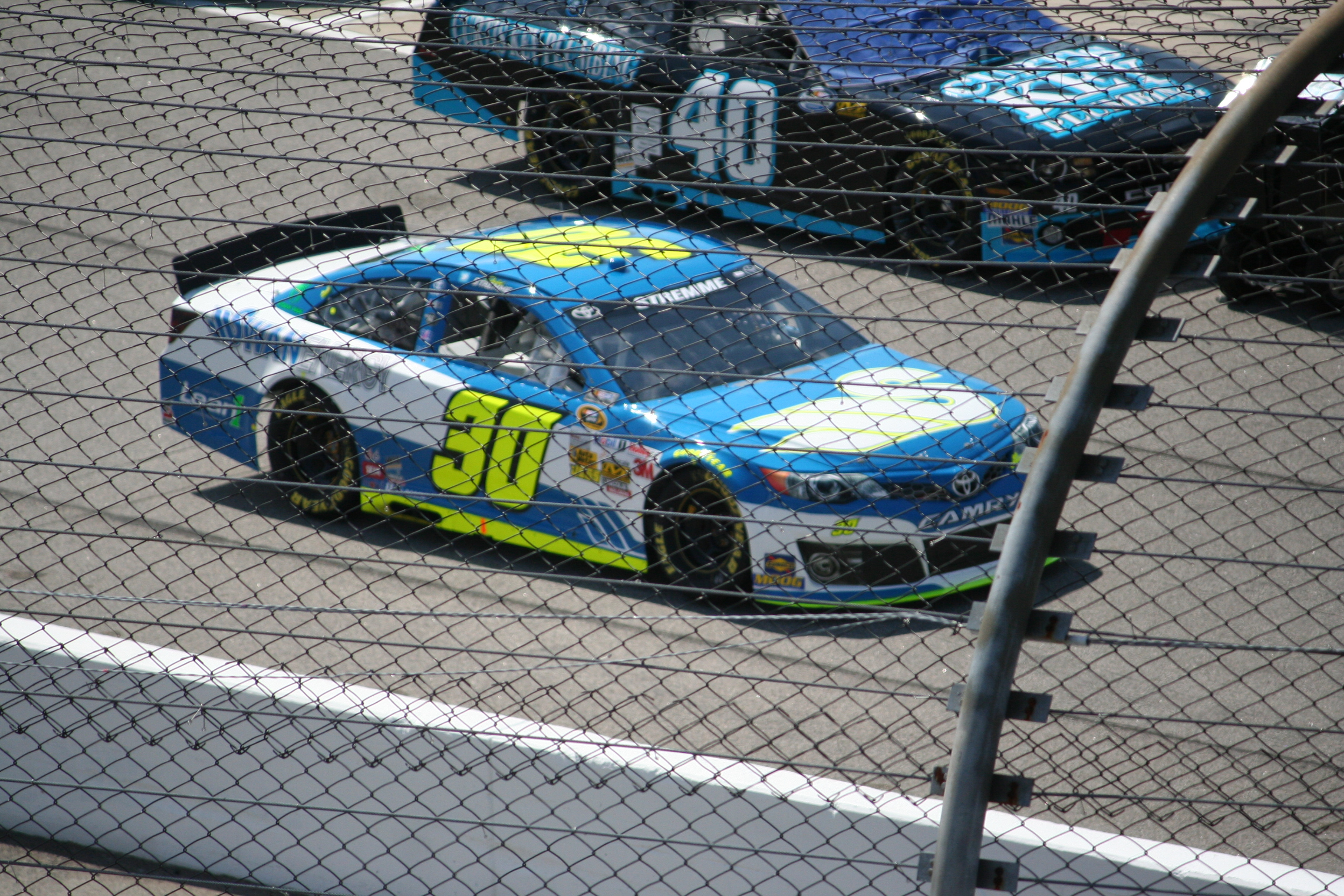
Stremme's 2013 Sprint Cup car at Richmond

=== 2013 ===
For 2013, Stremme returned to the No. 30, now Swan Racing Company, with the exception of the Daytona 500 where Michael Waltrip drove the car, renumbered for the event with No. 26. Unlike Inception Motorsports, where Stremme was a start and park driver, Swan Racing has full sponsorship.

In the Camping World Truck Series inaugural running of the Mudsummer Classic at Eldora Speedway, Stremme served as the spotter for Ken Schrader.

After only recording four top-twenty finishes in the first 26 races in 2013, Stremme was released by Swan Racing following the September race at Richmond International Raceway, being replaced by Cole Whitt.

=== 2014 ===
Stremme was signed by Circle Sport to run the No. 33 beginning at the STP 500 at Martinsville. He attempted twelve races before being released, and has not raced in NASCAR since then.

== Post-NASCAR career ==
In 2014, Stremme founded Lethal Chassis, a dirt modified builder.

== Personal life ==
Stremme is married to Ashley Stremme, a model whose career in that included being Mrs. North Carolina and then Mrs. United States in 2016. She has also competed in the Better Half Dash (a charity race featuring NASCAR drivers' wives driving go-karts on the infield mini-oval at Charlotte), winning the 2013 race. She also hosts two racing radio shows, Slingin' Dirt (on Motor Racing Network) and Winged Nation.

== Motorsports career results ==
=== NASCAR ===
(key) (Bold – Pole position awarded by qualifying time. Italics – Pole position earned by points standings or practice time. * – Most laps led.)

==== Sprint Cup Series ====
NASCAR Sprint Cup Series results
Year	Team	No.	Make	1	2	3	4	5	6	7	8	9	10	11	12	13	14	15	16	17	18	19	20	21	22	23	24	25	26	27	28	29	30	31	32	33	34	35	36	NSCC	Pts	Ref
2005	Chip Ganassi Racing	39	Dodge	DAY	CAL	LVS	ATL	BRI	MAR	TEX	PHO	TAL	DAR	RCH	CLT	DOV	POC	MCH	SON	DAY	CHI; 16	NHA	POC	IND					RCH; 42	NHA	DOV	TAL	KAN	CLT; 36	MAR	ATL	TEX	PHO	HOM; 42	57th	244	
2005	Chip Ganassi Racing	40	Dodge																						GLN; QL^{†}	MCH	BRI	CAL												57th	244	
2006	Chip Ganassi Racing	40	Dodge	DAY; 28	CAL; 33	LVS; 33	ATL; 33	BRI; 36	MAR; 38	TEX; 21	PHO; 29	TAL; 34	RCH; 33	DAR; 25	CLT; 31	DOV; 41	POC; 26	MCH; 19	SON	DAY; 16	CHI; 21	NHA; 11	POC; 29	IND; 18	GLN	MCH; 28	BRI; 35	CAL; 36	RCH; 26	NHA; 20	DOV; 18	KAN; 26	TAL; 33	CLT; 15	MAR; 15	ATL; 39	TEX; 24	PHO; 18	HOM; 11	33rd	2865	
2007	Chip Ganassi Racing	40	Dodge	DAY; 11	CAL; 19	LVS; 20	ATL; 13	BRI; 13	MAR; 35	TEX; 10	PHO; 43	TAL; 8	RCH; 38	DAR; 37	CLT; 17	DOV; 36	POC; 23	MCH; 40	SON; 32	NHA; 27	DAY; 22	CHI; 34	IND; 26	POC; 25	GLN; 21	MCH; 21	BRI; 14	CAL; 34	RCH; 19	NHA; 42	DOV; 39	KAN; 17	TAL; 17	CLT; 9	MAR; 37	ATL; 39	TEX; 41	PHO; 20	HOM; 11	24th	3163	
2008	Chip Ganassi Racing	40	Dodge	DAY	CAL	LVS	ATL	BRI	MAR	TEX	PHO	TAL; 28	RCH	DAR	CLT	DOV	POC	MCH	SON	NHA	DAY	CHI	IND	POC	GLN	MCH	BRI	CAL	RCH	NHA	DOV	KAN	TAL	CLT	MAR	ATL	TEX	PHO	HOM	66th	84	
2009	Penske Championship Racing	12	Dodge	DAY; 33	CAL; 13	LVS; 18	ATL; 23	BRI; 19	MAR; 22	TEX; 14	PHO; 18	TAL; 31	RCH; 38	DAR; 24	CLT; 22	DOV; 31	POC; 34	MCH; 38	SON; 39	NHA; 28	DAY; 35	CHI; 26	IND; 16	POC; 32	GLN; 26	MCH; 13	BRI; 20	ATL; 14	RCH; 26	NHA; 28	DOV; 29	KAN; 25	CAL; 16	CLT; 19	MAR; 33	TAL; 22	TEX	PHO		32nd	2919	
2009	Phoenix Racing	09	Chevy																																				HOM; DNQ	32nd	2919	
2010	Latitude 43 Motorsports	26	Ford	DAY	CAL	LVS	ATL	BRI; 24	MAR; 37	PHO; DNQ	TEX; DNQ	TAL; 27	RCH; 29	DAR; 24	DOV; 27	CLT; DNQ	POC; 24	MCH; 30	SON	NHA; 31	DAY; 37	CHI; 36	IND; DNQ	POC; DNQ	GLN	MCH	BRI	ATL	RCH	NHA	DOV	KAN	CAL	CLT	MAR	TAL	TEX	PHO	HOM	46th	825	
2011	Inception Motorsports	30	Chevy	DAY	PHO	LVS	BRI	CAL	MAR	TEX	TAL	RCH; 34	DAR; 41	DOV; 42	CLT; 40	KAN; 39	POC	MCH; 41	SON	DAY	KEN; DNQ	NHA; 37	IND; DNQ	POC; 38	GLN	MCH; 40	BRI; 32	ATL; DNQ	RCH; 40	CHI; 41	NHA; 38	DOV; 41	KAN; 40	CLT; 41	TAL	MAR; 38	TEX; DNQ	PHO; DNQ	HOM; 42	41st	80	
2012	Inception Motorsports	30	Toyota	DAY; 37	PHO; 29	LVS; 28	BRI; 38	CAL; 39	MAR; 30	TEX; DNQ	KAN; 38	RCH; 37	TAL; 39	DAR; 39	CLT; 38	DOV; 33	POC; DNQ	MCH; DNQ	SON	KEN; 39	DAY; 35	NHA; 35	IND; 24	POC; 34	GLN	MCH; 34	BRI; 37	ATL; 39												36th	236	
2012	Swan Racing Company	30	Toyota																										RCH; 37	CHI; 39	NHA; 35	DOV; DNQ	TAL; 33	CLT; 37	KAN; DNQ	MAR; 40	TEX; DNQ	PHO; 34	HOM; 38	36th	236	
2013	Swan Racing Company	30	Toyota	DAY	PHO; 30	LVS; 32	BRI; 20	CAL; 31	MAR; 36	TEX; 27	KAN; 32	RCH; 31	TAL; 12	DAR; 40	CLT; 32	DOV; 28	POC; 28	MCH; 29	SON; 36	KEN; 25	DAY; 37	NHA; 20	IND; 40	POC; 30	GLN; 33	MCH; 26	BRI; 17	ATL; 29	RCH; 38	CHI	NHA	DOV	KAN	CLT	TAL	MAR	TEX	PHO	HOM	36th	362	
2014	Circle Sport	33	Chevy	DAY	PHO	LVS	BRI	CAL	MAR; 39	TEX; DNQ	DAR; 36	RCH; 35	TAL	KAN	CLT	DOV; 37	POC	MCH; 39	SON	KEN; 35	DAY	NHA	IND; DNQ	POC	GLN	MCH	BRI; 31	ATL			NHA; 40	DOV; 37	KAN	CLT	TAL	MAR	TEX	PHO	HOM	43rd	75	
2014	Circle Sport	90	Chevy																										RCH; 36	CHI										43rd	75	
^{†} - Qualified but replaced by Scott Pruett

^{*} Season still in progress
^{1} Ineligible for series points

===== Daytona 500 =====
Year	Team	Manufacturer	Start	Finish
2006	Chip Ganassi Racing	Dodge	32	28
2007	Chip Ganassi Racing	Dodge	6	11
2009	Penske Championship Racing	Dodge	24	33
2012	Inception Motorsports	Toyota	42	37

==== Nationwide Series ====
NASCAR Nationwide Series results
Year	Team	No.	Make	1	2	3	4	5	6	7	8	9	10	11	12	13	14	15	16	17	18	19	20	21	22	23	24	25	26	27	28	29	30	31	32	33	34	35	NNSC	Pts	Ref
2003	Phoenix Racing	1	Dodge	DAY	CAR	LVS	DAR	BRI	TEX	TAL	NSH; 7	CAL	RCH; 14	GTY; 14	NZH; 6	CLT	DOV; 31	NSH; 3	KEN; 10	MLW; 3	DAY	CHI	NHA	PPR; 11	IRP; 17	MCH	BRI	DAR	RCH; 13	DOV; 21	KAN	CLT; 14	MEM; 9	ATL; 12	PHO; 13				22nd	2354	
2003	Braun Racing	30	Dodge																																	CAR; 5	HOM; 14		22nd	2354	
2004	Braun Racing	30	Dodge							NSH; 32				RCH; 35																									10th	3738	
2004	Braun Racing	32	Dodge	DAY; 6	CAR; 36	LVS; 3	DAR; 5	BRI; 18	TEX; 27		TAL; 40	CAL; 26	GTY; 8		NZH; 5	CLT; 8	DOV; 34	NSH; 35	KEN; 9	**MLW**; 2	DAY; 28	CHI; 34	NHA; 28	PPR; 7	IRP; 11	MCH; 11	BRI; 6	CAL; 36	RCH; 8	DOV; 16	KAN; 3	CLT; 34	MEM; 7						10th	3738	
2004	FitzBradshaw Racing	14	Chevy																															ATL; 8	PHO; 21	DAR; 31	HOM; 12		10th	3738	
2005	FitzBradshaw Racing	14	Dodge	DAY; 40	CAL; 8	MXC; 22	LVS; 3	ATL; 13	NSH; 26	BRI; 38	TEX; 17	PHO; 3	TAL; 3	DAR; 6	RCH; 27	CLT; 8	DOV; 33	NSH; 6	KEN; 32	MLW; 5	DAY; 18	CHI; 20	NHA; 22	PPR; 35	GTY; 22	IRP; 5	GLN; 17	MCH; 22	BRI; 26	CAL; 9	RCH; 35	DOV; 19	KAN; 43	CLT; 23	MEM; 11	TEX; 18	PHO; 34	HOM; 32	13th	3694	
2006	Chip Ganassi Racing	41	Dodge	DAY	CAL	MXC	LVS	ATL	BRI	TEX	NSH	PHO	TAL	RCH	DAR	CLT	DOV	NSH	KEN	MLW; 26	DAY	CHI	NHA	MAR	GTY	IRP	GLN	MCH	BRI	CAL	RCH	DOV	KAN	CLT	MEM	TEX	PHO	HOM	118th	85	
2007	FitzBradshaw Racing	22	Dodge	DAY; DNQ	CAL; 12	MXC	LVS; 5	ATL; 11	BRI		TEX; 19					CLT; 16	DOV						CHI; 25	GTY	IRP	CGV	GLN	MCH; 24											41st	1554	
2007	Chip Ganassi Racing	41	Dodge							**NSH**; 11		PHO; 11	TAL	RCH	DAR; 30			NSH; 14	KEN; 4	MLW	NHA	DAY																	41st	1554	
2007	Chip Ganassi Racing	42	Dodge																										BRI; 15	CAL	RCH	DOV	KAN	CLT	MEM	TEX	PHO	HOM	41st	1554	
2008	Rusty Wallace Racing	64	Chevy	DAY; 42	CAL; 17	LVS; 5	ATL; 30	BRI; 9	NSH; 6	TEX; 35	PHO; 10	MXC	TAL; 2	RCH; 6	DAR; 6	CLT; 12	DOV; 3	NSH; 2	KEN; 12	MLW; 34	NHA; 17	DAY; 8	CHI; 23	GTY; 9	IRP; 13	CGV	GLN	MCH; 16	BRI; 5	CAL; 10	RCH; 9	DOV; 11	KAN; 17	CLT; 31	MEM; 10	TEX; 10	PHO; 35	HOM; 16	11th	3887	
2011	ML Motorsports	70	Chevy	DAY	PHO	LVS	BRI	CAL	TEX	TAL	NSH; 20	RCH; 9	DAR	DOV	IOW	CLT	CHI	MCH; 12	ROA	DAY	KEN; 23	NHA	NSH; 16	IRP; 13	IOW	GLN	CGV	BRI; 17	ATL	RCH; 13	CHI; 26	DOV	KAN; 14	CLT	TEX; 34	PHO; 11	HOM; 15		112th	0^{1}	

==== Camping World Truck Series ====
NASCAR Camping World Truck Series results
Year	Team	No.	Make	1	2	3	4	5	6	7	8	9	10	11	12	13	14	15	16	17	18	19	20	21	22	23	24	25	NCWTC	Pts	ref
2006	Bobby Hamilton Racing	04	Dodge	DAY	CAL	ATL	MAR; 32	GTY	CLT	MFD	DOV	TEX	MCH	MLW	KAN	KEN	MEM	IRP	NSH	BRI	NHA	LVS	TAL	MAR	ATL	TEX	PHO	HOM	83rd	67	
2008	Billy Ballew Motorsports	15	Toyota	DAY	CAL	ATL	MAR	KAN	CLT	MFD	DOV	TEX	MCH	MLW	MEM	KEN	IRP	NSH; 13	BRI; 9	GTW	NHA	LVS	TAL	MAR	ATL	TEX	PHO	HOM	46th	262	
2011	RSS Racing	27	Chevy	DAY	PHO	DAR	MAR	NSH	DOV	CLT	KAN	TEX	KEN	IOW	NSH	IRP	POC	MCH	BRI	ATL	CHI; 34	NHA	KEN	LVS	TAL	MAR	TEX	HOM	109th	0^{1}	

=== ARCA Re/Max Series ===
(key) (Bold – Pole position awarded by qualifying time. Italics – Pole position earned by points standings or practice time. * – Most laps led.)

ARCA Re/Max Series results
Year	Team	No.	Make	1	2	3	4	5	6	7	8	9	10	11	12	13	14	15	16	17	18	19	20	21	22	23	ARMC	Pts	Ref
2003	Chip Ganassi Racing	77	Dodge	DAY	ATL	NSH	SLM	TOL	KEN	CLT	BLN	KAN	MCH	LER	POC	POC	NSH	ISF	WIN	DSF	CHI	SLM	TAL; 21	CLT	SBO		151st	125	
2006	Chip Ganassi Racing	40	Dodge	DAY	NSH	SLM	WIN	KEN	TOL	**POC**; 40																	91st	285	
2006	Rusty Wallace Inc.	61	Dodge								MCH; 1*	KAN	KEN	BLN	POC	GTW	NSH	MCH	ISF	MIL	TOL	DSF	CHI	SLM	TAL	IOW	91st	285	

Achievements
Preceded by Scott Riggs	NASCAR Busch Series Rookie of the Year; 2003	Succeeded by Kyle Busch
