= 2013 Aaron's 499 =

Race details
- Race 10 of 36 in the 2013 NASCAR Sprint Cup Series
- Talladega Superspeedway
- Date: May 5, 2013
- Location: Talladega Superspeedway, Talladega, Alabama, U.S.
- Course: Permanent racing facility
- Course length: 2.66 miles (4.281 km)
- Distance: 192 laps, 510.72 mi (821.924 km)
- Scheduled distance: 188 laps, 500.08 mi (804.801 km)
- Weather: Variable clouds/scattered showers and thunderstorms with 60 °F (16 °C); wind out of the NNW at 7 miles per hour (11 km/h).
- Average speed: 148.729 mph (239.356 km/h)

Pole position
Driver	Carl Edwards	Roush Fenway Racing
- Time: 47.958 seconds

Most laps led
Driver	Matt Kenseth	Joe Gibbs Racing
- Laps: 142

Winner
No. 34	David Ragan	Front Row Motorsports

Television in the United States
- Network: Fox
- Announcers: Mike Joy, Darrell Waltrip, Larry McReynolds
- Nielsen ratings: 4.6/10; 7.3 (45 million viewers)

The 2013 Aaron's 499 was a NASCAR Sprint Cup Series stock car race that was held on May 5, 2013, at Talladega Superspeedway in Talladega, Alabama, United States. Contested over 192 laps on the 2.66-mile (4.28-kilometre) tri-oval, it was the tenth race of the 2013 NASCAR Sprint Cup Series season. David Ragan of Front Row Motorsports won the race, his second career Sprint Cup win. Teammate David Gilliland finished second, while Carl Edwards, Michael Waltrip, and Jimmie Johnson rounded out the Top 5.

The race weekend was marred by rain, with qualifying being rained out. During the race, the event was stopped for three hours due to the weather at the track. Edwards, Johnson and Matt Kenseth battled for the win, but on the green–white–checker finish, Ragan and Gilliland claimed the lead during the final lap.

== Report ==
=== Background ===
Talladega Superspeedway, the track where the race was held.

Talladega Superspeedway is a four turn tri-oval track that is 2.66 miles (4.28 km) long. The track's turns are banked at 33 degrees, while the front stretch, the location of the finish line, is 18 degrees. The back stretch, opposite of the front, is at only two degrees. The racetrack has a seating capacity for 109,000 spectators. Brad Keselowski was the defending race winner after winning the event during the 2012 race.

Before the race, Jimmie Johnson was leading the Drivers' Championship with 343 points, while Carl Edwards stood in second with 300 points. Kasey Kahne and Dale Earnhardt Jr. followed in the third and fourth position with 297 points each, seven ahead of Clint Bowyer in fifth. Keselowski, with 284, was in sixth; six points ahead of Kyle Busch. Eighth-placed Greg Biffle was one point ahead of Kevin Harvick and Paul Menard in ninth and tenth, and fourteen ahead of Aric Almirola in eleventh. Jamie McMurray completed the first twelve positions with 245 points. In the Manufacturers' Championship, Chevrolet was leading with 64 points, five points ahead of Toyota. Ford was third after recording only 43 points during the first nine races.

There were 45 cars on the initial entry list, though it was reduced to 44 after Mike Bliss withdrew. All but four teams had entered the first nine races of the season; Elliott Sadler was attempting his second race of the season, Trevor Bayne was attempting his third, while Scott Speed (six) and Michael McDowell (eight) were also part-timers attempting the race. Sadler had to qualify for the race on speed due to being too low in owners points.

=== Entry list ===
(R) - Denotes rookie driver.

(i) - Denotes driver who is ineligible for series driver points.

No.	Driver	Team	Manufacturer
1	Jamie McMurray	Earnhardt Ganassi Racing	Chevrolet
2	Brad Keselowski	Penske Racing	Ford
5	Kasey Kahne	Hendrick Motorsports	Chevrolet
7	Dave Blaney	Tommy Baldwin Racing	Chevrolet
9	Marcos Ambrose	Richard Petty Motorsports	Ford
10	Danica Patrick (R)	Stewart–Haas Racing	Chevrolet
11	Denny Hamlin	Joe Gibbs Racing	Toyota
13	Casey Mears	Germain Racing	Ford
14	Tony Stewart	Stewart–Haas Racing	Chevrolet
15	Clint Bowyer	Michael Waltrip Racing	Toyota
16	Greg Biffle	Roush Fenway Racing	Ford
17	Ricky Stenhouse Jr. (R)	Roush Fenway Racing	Ford
18	Kyle Busch	Joe Gibbs Racing	Toyota
20	Matt Kenseth	Joe Gibbs Racing	Toyota
22	Joey Logano	Penske Racing	Ford
24	Jeff Gordon	Hendrick Motorsports	Chevrolet
27	Paul Menard	Richard Childress Racing	Chevrolet
29	Kevin Harvick	Richard Childress Racing	Chevrolet
30	David Stremme	Swan Racing	Toyota
31	Jeff Burton	Richard Childress Racing	Chevrolet
32	Terry Labonte	FAS Lane Racing	Ford
33	Landon Cassill	Circle Sport	Chevrolet
34	David Ragan	Front Row Motorsports	Ford
35	Josh Wise (i)	Front Row Motorsports	Ford
36	J. J. Yeley	Tommy Baldwin Racing	Chevrolet
38	David Gilliland	Front Row Motorsports	Ford
39	Ryan Newman	Stewart–Haas Racing	Chevrolet
42	Juan Pablo Montoya	Earnhardt Ganassi Racing	Chevrolet
43	Aric Almirola	Richard Petty Motorsports	Ford
47	Bobby Labonte	JTG Daugherty Racing	Toyota
48	Jimmie Johnson	Hendrick Motorsports	Chevrolet
51	Regan Smith (i)	Phoenix Racing	Chevrolet
55	Michael Waltrip	Michael Waltrip Racing	Toyota
56	Martin Truex Jr.	Michael Waltrip Racing	Toyota
78	Kurt Busch	Furniture Row Racing	Chevrolet
81	Elliott Sadler (i)	Joe Gibbs Racing	Toyota
83	David Reutimann	BK Racing	Toyota
87	Joe Nemechek (i)	NEMCO-Jay Robinson Racing	Toyota
88	Dale Earnhardt Jr.	Hendrick Motorsports	Chevrolet
93	Travis Kvapil	BK Racing	Toyota
95	Scott Speed	Leavine Family Racing	Ford
98	Michael McDowell	Phil Parsons Racing	Ford
99	Carl Edwards	Roush Fenway Racing	Ford
Official entry list

=== Practice and qualifying ===
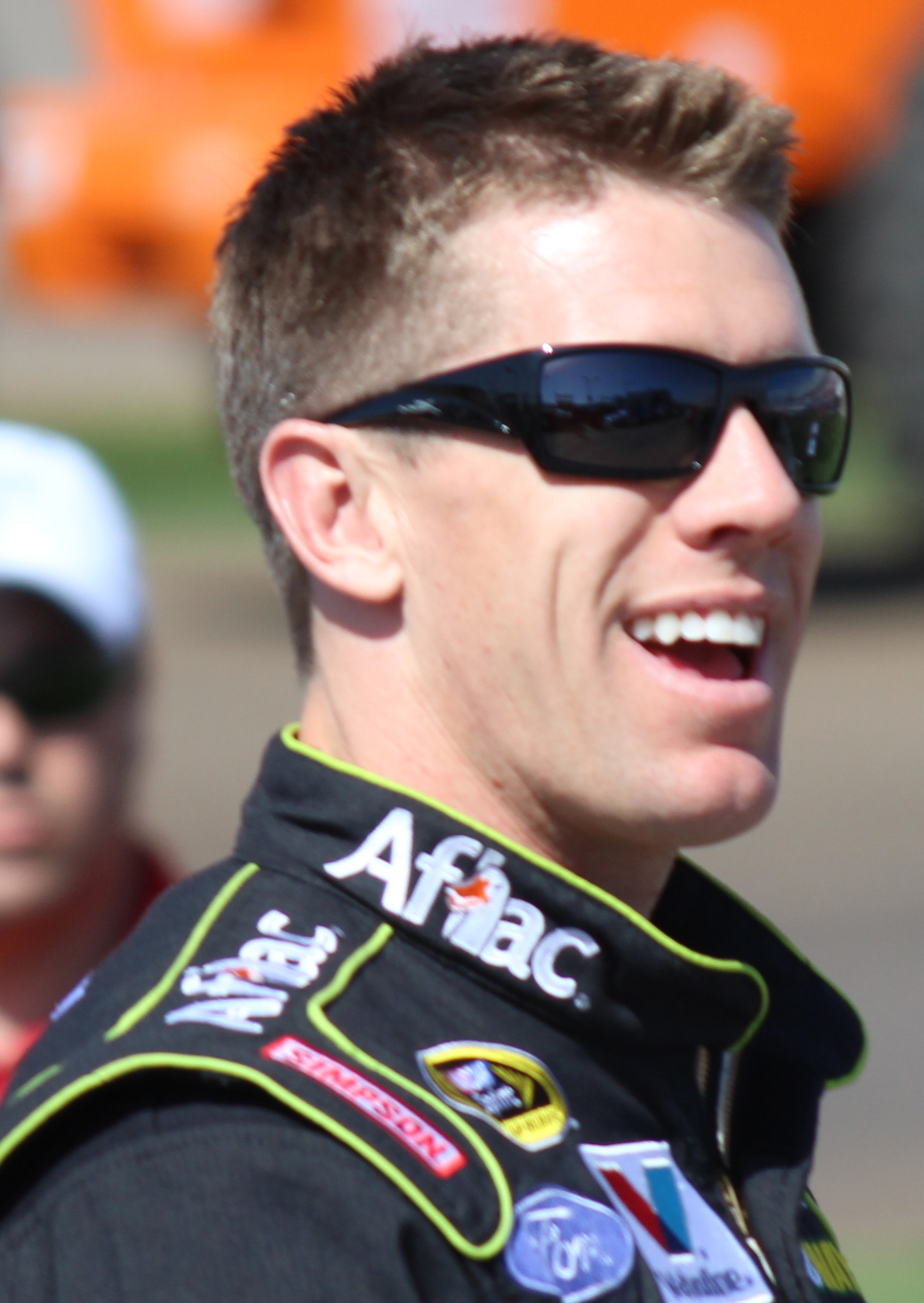
Carl Edwards (pictured in 2012) was rewarded the pole position after rain showers cancelled qualifying.

Two practice sessions were held in preparation for the race; both on Friday, May 3. The first session lasted for 45 minutes, while second session was 60 minutes long. During the first practice session, Edwards, for the Roush Fenway Racing team, was quickest ahead of Truex Jr. in second and Marcos Ambrose in third. Joey Logano was scored fourth, and Ryan Newman managed fifth. Matt Kenseth was sixth, while Denny Hamlin and his relief driver Brian Vickers were scored seventh. Johnson. Jeff Gordon, and Kahne rounded out the top ten quickest drivers in the session.

Keselowski was quickest in the second and final practice session, ahead of David Stremme in second and Kahne in third. Almirola was fourth quickest, and Travis Kvapil took fifth. Tony Stewart, Gordon, McMurray, Bobby Labonte, and Edwards followed in the top ten.

Qualifying was affected by wet weather soaking the track, therefore canceling the session and making first practice times determine the qualifying grid. Edwards, after finishing the first practice in first, was rewarded the pole position. He was joined on the front row of the grid by Truex Jr. Ambrose was third, Logano took fourth, and Newman started fifth. Kenseth, Hamlin, Johnson, Gordon and Kahne rounded out the first ten positions. The only driver who failed to qualify for the race was Elliott Sadler.

=== Race summary ===
The green flag flew at 12:10 PM CDT (1:10 PM EST). Martin Truex Jr. led the first five laps, but Matt Kenseth took the lead on lap 6 to begin his domination of the race. The first caution flew for fluid on the track on lap 23 after Trevor Bayne had blown an engine. During pit stops, Denny Hamlin climbed out of his car to surrender the rest of his day to Brian Vickers. Under NASCAR rules, Hamlin started the race and was credited with any results earned.

The second caution flew on lap 43 for the Big One: which occurred when Kyle Busch touched Kasey Kahne entering turn 1, and collected an additional twelve cars, including Truex, Vickers, Kevin Harvick, Tony Stewart, Jamie McMurray, Greg Biffle, Marcos Ambrose, Jeff Burton, David Stremme, Kurt Busch, David Reutimann, Casey Mears, Scott Speed, Clint Bowyer, and Jeff Gordon. After the crash, Kyle Busch stated, "I was trying to go to the outside of him, but he just moved up in front of me and I wasn't expecting it. I tried to go to the outside of him and before I could get to the outside of him, I got in the back of him."

Matt Kenseth continued to lead most of this stretch, with Jimmie Johnson close behind in second. On lap 124, the third caution flew for rain. Just before the caution, Kenseth and Johnson had been shuffled back by Ricky Stenhouse Jr. and his teammate Carl Edwards. Edwards made a move for the lead and beat Stenhouse by one-half-an-inch for the lead when the third yellow came out. As the rain quickly intensified over the speedway, the red flag flew for 3 hours and 36 minutes as the track was dried. The initial shower was brief, but just as the track was almost dried, a heavier thunderstorm soaked the speedway.

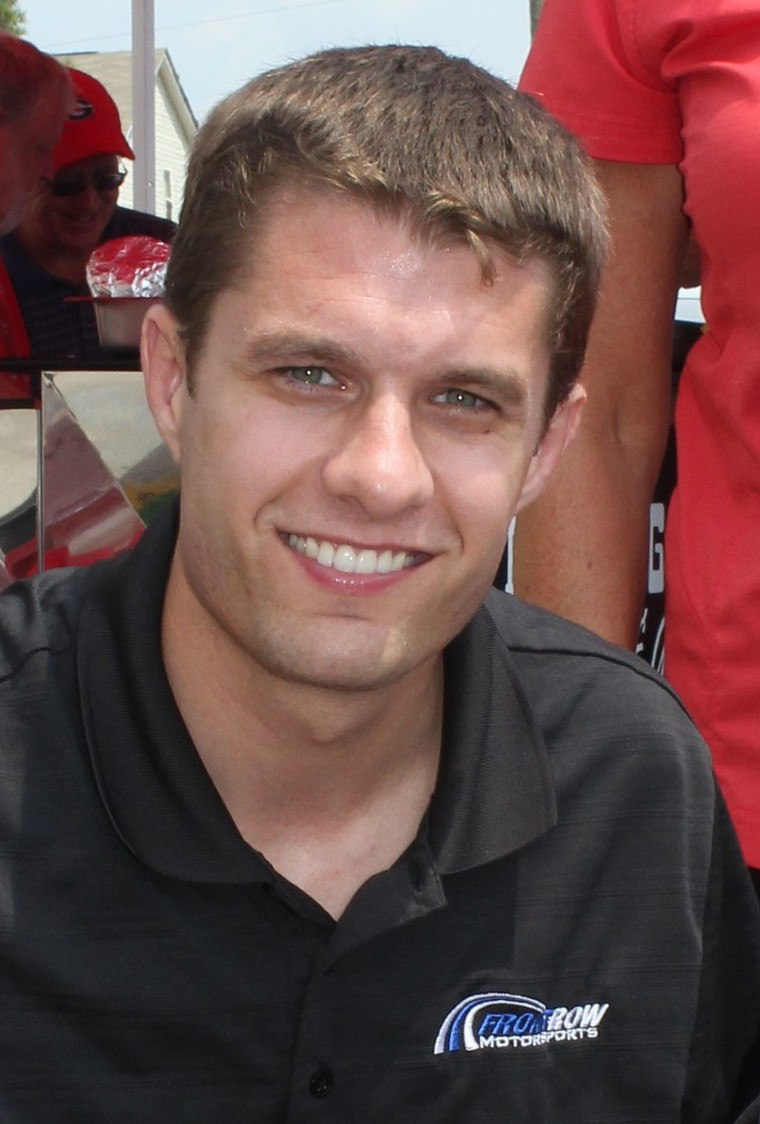
David Ragan won the race for Front Row Motorsports.

Hours later after the track was dried, the restart began and Kenseth regained the lead. The race ran green through a round of green-flag pit stops. Johnson took the lead after pit stops, hoping to become the first driver since himself in 2006 to win the Daytona 500 and the spring Talladega race in the same year. Kenseth, who had the best car, was in the mix as well, along with Edwards, Kurt Busch, Michael Waltrip, and Bowyer in a six-car breakaway. The fourth caution then came out on lap 175 when Michael McDowell hit the wall in turn 2.

With 10 laps left in the race, darkness was creeping in. On lap 182, the fifth caution of the race came out for a large crash on the backstretch. It started when Ricky Stenhouse Jr. tried to squeeze between the outside wall and J. J. Yeley. Yeley got loose, shot across the track, turned across the front of Marcos Ambrose and into the right-rear of Kurt Busch, collecting another ten cars, including Ryan Newman, Danica Patrick, Terry Labonte, Clint Bowyer, McMurray, Bobby Labonte, Waltrip, David Stremme, Truex, and Gordon. Busch took the worst hit as his car turned sideways, flipped over once and landed on top of Newman, then was struck by Bobby Labonte and Bowyer after landing back on the ground. It marked the first time the Gen-6 car had rolled over. When interviewed Newman angrily said to reporters that NASCAR should not have ordered them to race in the dark conditions by saying that if they could not finish the race in daylight, they should call it official.

With two laps to go and with darkness imminent, NASCAR cancelled the three green-white-checker rule for the race and announced a decision to only have one attempt to finish under green, which it had also done the night before in the Nationwide race. On the restart, Kenseth, Johnson, and Edwards battled for the lead and their struggle allowed Front Row Motorsports drivers David Ragan and David Gilliland to slip by on the final lap. Ragan cleared the leaders in turn 3 and held off both Johnson, Gilliland, Edwards, and Michael Waltrip to take his second career win, his first since winning the 2011 Coke Zero 400. It was the first win in NASCAR for FRM. With Ragan's teammate Gilliland finishing 2nd, Front Row Motorsports earned a surprising 1–2 finish.

There were five cautions for 31 laps and 30 lead changes between 17 different drivers throughout the course of the race. The race took seven hours to complete.

== Results ==
=== Qualifying ===
Grid	No.	Driver	Team	Manufacturer	Time	Speed
1	99	Carl Edwards	Roush Fenway Racing	Ford	47.958	199.675
2	56	Martin Truex Jr.	Michael Waltrip Racing	Toyota	47.964	199.650
3	9	Marcos Ambrose	Richard Petty Motorsports	Ford	47.974	199.608
4	22	Joey Logano	Penske Racing	Ford	47.977	199.596
5	39	Ryan Newman	Stewart–Haas Racing	Chevrolet	47.990	199.542
6	20	Matt Kenseth	Joe Gibbs Racing	Toyota	48.008	199.467
7	11	Denny Hamlin	Joe Gibbs Racing	Toyota	48.044	199.317
8	48	Jimmie Johnson	Hendrick Motorsports	Chevrolet	48.067	199.222
9	24	Jeff Gordon	Hendrick Motorsports	Chevrolet	48.188	198.722
10	5	Kasey Kahne	Hendrick Motorsports	Chevrolet	48.202	198.664
11	2	Brad Keselowski	Penske Racing	Ford	48.216	198.606
12	88	Dale Earnhardt Jr.	Hendrick Motorsports	Chevrolet	48.227	198.561
13	18	Kyle Busch	Joe Gibbs Racing	Toyota	48.242	198.499
14	55	Michael Waltrip	Michael Waltrip Racing	Toyota	48.267	198.396
15	21	Trevor Bayne	Wood Brothers Racing	Ford	48.273	198.372
16	27	Paul Menard	Richard Childress Racing	Chevrolet	48.289	198.306
17	16	Greg Biffle	Roush Fenway Racing	Ford	48.324	198.612
18	43	Aric Almirola	Richard Petty Motorsports	Ford	48.373	197.962
19	34	David Ragan	Front Row Motorsports	Ford	48.455	197.627
20	15	Clint Bowyer	Michael Waltrip Racing	Toyota	48.459	197.610
21	17	Ricky Stenhouse Jr.	Roush Fenway Racing	Ford	48.474	197.549
22	13	Casey Mears	Germain Racing	Ford	48.500	197.443
23	10	Danica Patrick	Stewart–Haas Racing	Chevrolet	48.501	197.439
24	29	Kevin Harvick	Richard Childress Racing	Chevrolet	48.533	197.309
25	14	Tony Stewart	Stewart–Haas Racing	Chevrolet	48.616	196.972
26	35	Josh Wise	Front Row Motorsports	Ford	48.731	196.507
27	30	David Stremme	Swan Racing	Toyota	48.772	196.342
28	1	Jamie McMurray	Earnhardt Ganassi Racing	Chevrolet	48.778	196.318
29	31	Jeff Burton	Richard Childress Racing	Chevrolet	48.861	195.985
30	42	Juan Pablo Montoya	Earnhardt Ganassi Racing	Chevrolet	48.892	195.860
31	38	David Gilliland	Front Row Motorsports	Ford	48.900	195.828
32	93	Travis Kvapil	BK Racing	Toyota	49.012	195.381
33	78	Kurt Busch	Furniture Row Racing	Chevrolet	49.083	195.098
34	51	Regan Smith	Phoenix Racing	Chevrolet	49.280	194.318
35	83	David Reutimann	BK Racing	Toyota	49.328	194.129
36	95	Scott Speed	Leavine Family Racing	Ford	50.447	189.823
37	32	Terry Labonte	FAS Lane Racing	Ford	50.639	189.103
38	98	Michael McDowell	Phil Parsons Racing	Ford	50.655	189.044
39	47	Bobby Labonte	JTG Daugherty Racing	Toyota	50.776	188.593
40	7	Dave Blaney	Tommy Baldwin Racing	Chevrolet	51.174	187.126
41	87	Joe Nemechek	NEMCO Motorsports	Toyota	51.295	186.685
42	33	Landon Cassill	Circle Sport	Chevrolet	52.585	182.105
43	36	J. J. Yeley	Tommy Baldwin Racing	Chevrolet	53.864	177.781
Failed to Qualify
	81	Elliott Sadler	Joe Gibbs Racing	Toyota	50.302	190.370
Sources:

- Qualifying was canceled because of rain showers, prompting the grid to be set by first practice lap times.

=== Race results ===
Pos	Car	Driver	Team	Manufacturer	Laps	Points
1	34	David Ragan	Front Row Motorsports	Ford	192	47
2	38	David Gilliland	Front Row Motorsports	Ford	192	42
3	99	Carl Edwards	Roush Fenway Racing	Ford	192	42
4	55	Michael Waltrip	Michael Waltrip Racing	Toyota	192	40
5	48	Jimmie Johnson	Hendrick Motorsports	Chevrolet	192	40
6	51	Regan Smith	Phoenix Racing	Chevrolet	192	–
7	56	Martin Truex Jr.	Michael Waltrip Racing	Toyota	192	38
8	20	Matt Kenseth	Joe Gibbs Racing	Toyota	192	38
9	95	Scott Speed	Leavine Family Racing	Ford	192	36
10	43	Aric Almirola	Richard Petty Motorsports	Ford	192	35
11	24	Jeff Gordon	Hendrick Motorsports	Chevrolet	192	34
12	30	David Stremme	Swan Racing	Toyota	192	32
13	17	Ricky Stenhouse Jr.	Roush Fenway Racing	Ford	192	32
14	9	Marcos Ambrose	Richard Petty Motorsports	Ford	192	30
15	2	Brad Keselowski	Penske Racing	Ford	192	30
16	7	Dave Blaney	Tommy Baldwin Racing	Chevrolet	192	28
17	88	Dale Earnhardt Jr.	Hendrick Motorsports	Chevrolet	192	27
18	15	Clint Bowyer	Michael Waltrip Racing	Toyota	192	26
19	35	Josh Wise	Front Row Motorsports	Ford	192	–
20	47	Bobby Labonte	JTG Daugherty Racing	Toyota	192	25
21	98	Michael McDowell	Phil Parsons Racing	Ford	191	23
22	33	Landon Cassill	Circle Sport	Chevrolet	191	22
23	1	Jamie McMurray	Earnhardt Ganassi Racing	Chevrolet	191	22
24	13	Casey Mears	Germain Racing	Ford	189	20
25	42	Juan Pablo Montoya	Earnhardt Ganassi Racing	Chevrolet	189	19
26	27	Paul Menard	Richard Childress Racing	Chevrolet	188	19
27	14	Tony Stewart	Stewart–Haas Racing	Chevrolet	187	17
28	31	Jeff Burton	Richard Childress Racing	Chevrolet	187	17
29	32	Terry Labonte	FAS Lane Racing	Ford	185	15
30	78	Kurt Busch	Furniture Row Racing	Chevrolet	182	15
31	36	J. J. Yeley	Tommy Baldwin Racing	Chevrolet	182	13
32	39	Ryan Newman	Stewart–Haas Racing	Chevrolet	182	13
33	10	Danica Patrick	Stewart–Haas Racing	Chevrolet	182	11
34	11	Denny Hamlin	Joe Gibbs Racing	Toyota	148	10
35	22	Joey Logano	Penske Racing	Ford	143	9
36	16	Greg Biffle	Roush Fenway Racing	Ford	141	8
37	18	Kyle Busch	Joe Gibbs Racing	Toyota	138	7
38	93	Travis Kvapil	BK Racing	Toyota	128	6
39	87	Joe Nemechek	NEMCO-Jay Robinson Racing	Toyota	53	–
40	29	Kevin Harvick	Richard Childress Racing	Chevrolet	47	5
41	83	David Reutimann	BK Racing	Toyota	43	3
42	5	Kasey Kahne	Hendrick Motorsports	Chevrolet	42	2
43	21	Trevor Bayne	Wood Brothers Racing	Ford	22	–

== Standings after the race ==
Drivers' Championship standings

	Pos	Driver	Points
	1	Jimmie Johnson	383
	2	Carl Edwards	342 (–41)
1	3	Dale Earnhardt Jr.	324 (–59)
3	4	Matt Kenseth	317 (–66)
	5	Clint Bowyer	316 (–67)

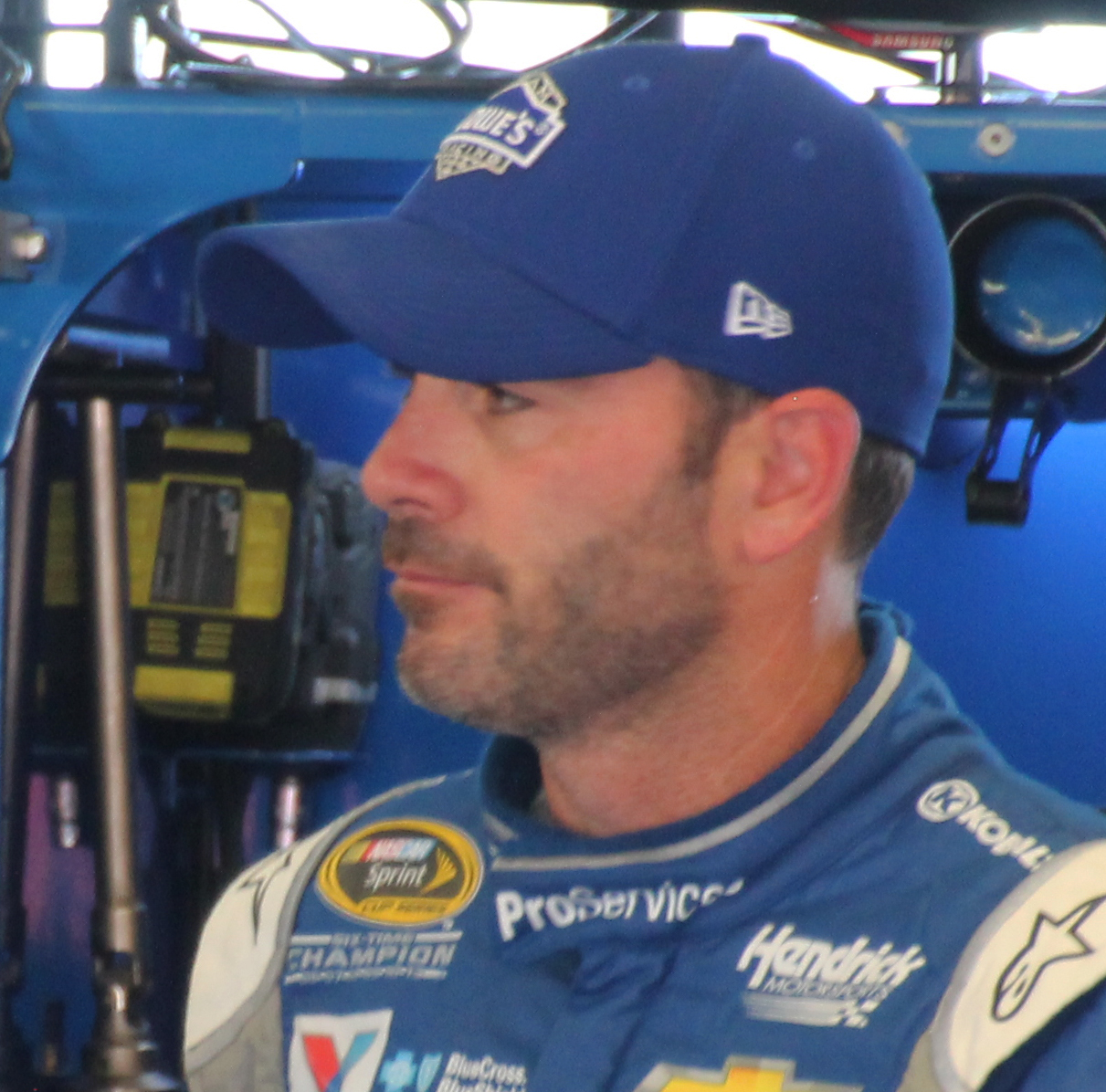
Jimmie Johnson (pictured in 2015) led the points standings after the race.

Manufacturers' Championship standings

Pos	Manufacturer	Points
1	Chevrolet	68
2	Toyota	63 (–5)
3	Ford	52 (–16)

- Note: Only the first twelve positions are included for the driver standings.

Previous race: 2013 Toyota Owners 400	Sprint Cup Series; 2013 season	Next race: 2013 Bojangles' Southern 500
