= 2011 Ford 400 =

Motor race held in Homestead, Florida

Race details
- Race 36 of 36 in the 2011 NASCAR Sprint Cup Series
- The 2011 Ford 400 program cover, featuring Carl Edwards.
- Date: November 20, 2011
- Official name: 13th Annual Ford 400
- Location: Homestead-Miami Speedway, Homestead, Florida
- Course: Permanent racing facility
- Course length: 1.5 miles (2.414 km)
- Distance: 267 laps, 400.5 mi (644.542 km)
- Weather: Temperatures reaching an average of 77.3 °F (25.2 °C); wind speeds up to 15 miles per hour (24 km/h)
- Average speed: 114.976 miles per hour (185.036 km/h)

Pole position
Driver	Carl Edwards	Roush Fenway Racing
- Time: 30.775

Most laps led
Driver	Carl Edwards	Roush Fenway Racing
- Laps: 119

Winner
No. 14	Tony Stewart	Stewart–Haas Racing

Television in the United States
- Network: ESPN
- Announcers: Allen Bestwick, Dale Jarrett, and Andy Petree
- Nielsen ratings: 4.6 (6.799 million)

The 2011 Ford 400, the 13th running of the event, was a stock car race that was held on November 20, 2011, at Homestead-Miami Speedway in Homestead, Florida. The race, which lasted 267 laps, was the thirty-sixth of the 2011 NASCAR Sprint Cup Series and the tenth and final race of the season-ending Chase for the Sprint Cup. Tony Stewart of the Stewart–Haas Racing team won the race from the fifteenth starting position. Roush Fenway Racing driver Carl Edwards finished second, and Martin Truex Jr. came in third for Michael Waltrip Racing.

Before the race, Stewart trailed Edwards by three points in the Drivers' Championship. Edwards won the pole position by recording the fastest lap time of qualifying and dominated the race, leading more laps than anyone else (119). Meanwhile, Stewart started in 15th and was relegated to the back of the field several times because of grille damage and slow pit stops. However, this did not deter Stewart, as he was able to make up the positions he lost and took the lead for the first time on lap 123. During a cycle of green-flag pit stops, Edwards came in for two tires on lap 201, while Stewart remained on-track for ten more laps in order to avoid pitting for the remainder of the race; he gained four fresh tires. A caution flag for brief rainfall forced Edwards to pit once more to top off on fuel. Although Edwards made his way up to second on the final restart, he was unable to overtake Stewart, who won the race.

There were eight cautions and a track record-breaking 26 lead changes between 15 drivers. Stewart's victory was the fifth of the season and the 44th of his career. It additionally earned him his third (and final) Drivers' Championship and the first title for Stewart–Haas Racing because of a tiebreaker that was determined by a countback of wins in the season. Behind the two title contenders, Kevin Harvick maintained third place and Matt Kenseth displaced Brad Keselowski and Jimmie Johnson for fourth place. The race attracted nearly seven million television viewers and is considered to be one of the best championship-deciding races in NASCAR history.

== Background ==
The layout of Homestead–Miami Speedway, where the race was held.

The 2011 Ford 400 was the 36th and final race of the 2011 NASCAR Sprint Cup Series, as well as the last of the ten-race season-ending Chase for the Sprint Cup. The race was held on Sunday, November 20, 2011, at Homestead–Miami Speedway in Homestead, Florida over a distance of 267 laps and 400.5 mi (644.5 km). Homestead–Miami Speedway was one of 14 intermediate tracks that hosted NASCAR events in 2011; its standard layout is a 1.5 mi (2.4 km) asphalt oval track with variable banking of 18–20 degrees in each of its four turns. The front stretch (where the start/finish line is located) and back stretch also have three-degree banking. The Sprint Cup Series held one race at the track every year since 1999. Beginning in 2002, the track hosted the championship weekend for the top three divisions of NASCAR (the Sprint Cup Series, Nationwide Series, and Camping World Truck Series).

Heading into the season finale, Carl Edwards led the Drivers' Championship with 2,359 points, three more than Tony Stewart in second. It was the closest deficit between the top-two drivers in the standings since the Chase for the Sprint Cup was introduced in 2004. A maximum of 48 points were available for the final race, which meant that Edwards needed to finish ahead of Stewart to win the championship. In the event of a points tie, Stewart would clinch the title based on a countback of wins in the season. Behind Edwards and Stewart, Kevin Harvick stood third with 2,308 points, followed by fourth-place Brad Keselowski with 2,294 points and fifth-place Jimmie Johnson with 2,291 points. Matt Kenseth, Dale Earnhardt Jr., Kurt Busch, Ryan Newman, Denny Hamlin, Jeff Gordon, and Kyle Busch rounded out the competitors of the Chase for the Sprint Cup. Chevrolet had already won their 35th Manufacturers' Championship because of Johnson's win in the Hollywood Casino 400. They were 50 points ahead of their nearest rival, Ford, while Toyota was third on 183 points and Dodge was fourth on 159.

Throughout the season, Edwards had only achieved one victory – the Kobalt Tools 400 in March – but his consistent top-ten finishes kept him in title contention; he came in second in the past two races, the AAA Texas 500 and Kobalt Tools 500, and finished no worse than 11th in the nine Chase for the Sprint Cup races. Stewart greatly underperformed in the season's first 26 races, earning only 11 top-ten results, but four wins in the Chase helped propel him to second in the standings. Edwards, the defending race winner, spoke on his and Stewart's emotions before the race: "We both are competitors and have that same desire to win and same amount of pressure that comes with that to go out and perform. The bad thing and good thing for both of us at the same time is that we both seem to be able to perform under that pressure. I truly believe this could come down to who wins this race is going to win this championship.” Stewart believed that the experience of his two previous championships (2002 and 2005) gave him an advantage over Edwards, who had never won the series title. During a press conference, he joked to a reporter: "I'll wreck my mom to win a championship. I'll wreck your mom to win a championship."

== Practice and qualifying ==
Two 80-minute practice sessions preceded the race on Sunday; they were both scheduled to begin on Friday afternoon, but were moved to Saturday morning after Friday's schedule was washed out by rain. In addition, the first practice session was extended to 90 minutes, and the second session was shortened to 45 minutes. Earnhardt was fastest in the first practice session with a lap time of 31.179 seconds, outpacing Edwards, Kenseth, Newman, Johnson, Kasey Kahne, Landon Cassill, Gordon, Harvick, and Juan Pablo Montoya. The Chase drivers outside the top-ten were Hamlin (12th), Stewart (15th), Kyle Busch (18th), Keselowski (25th), and Kurt Busch (28th). The session was stopped twice for Mike Skinner suffering an engine failure and a brief rain shower.

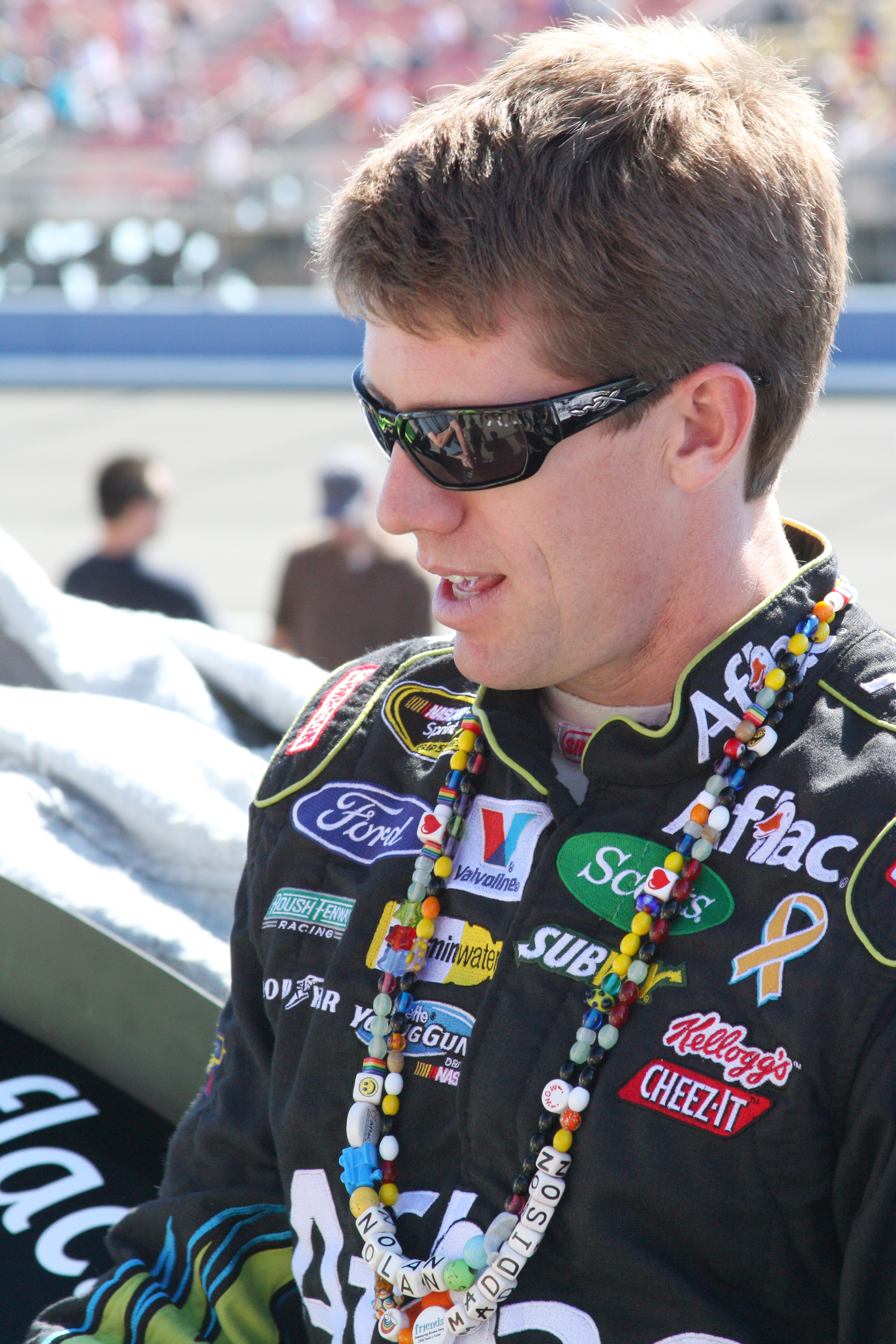
Carl Edwards (pictured in 2010) earned his tenth career pole position.

The second practice session was led by Edwards, whose quickest lap time was 31.556 seconds. David Ragan was second, Cole Whitt third, A. J. Allmendinger fourth, and Cassill fifth, with Martin Truex Jr., Clint Bowyer, Paul Menard, Dave Blaney, and Keselowski completing the top-ten. Other Chase drivers include Gordon in 12th, Johnson in 14th, Kenseth in 15th, Kyle Busch in 16th, Harvick in 18th, Earnhardt in 23rd, Newman in 26th, Stewart in 28th, Kurt Busch in 29th, and Hamlin in 37th. Debris on the track halted the session in its opening minutes.

The qualifying session began on Saturday afternoon. There were 48 cars entered for the session, but due to NASCAR's qualifying procedure, only 43 were allowed to race. The order of the drivers was set by their times in the first practice session (with the slowest going on-track first and the fastest going last), and each driver was required to complete up to two timed laps, the quickest of which would determine their starting position. With a time of 30.775 seconds, Edwards claimed the third pole position of the season and the tenth of his career. Truex, who held the pole until Edwards' lap, started alongside him on the grid's front row with a lap time that was 0.116 seconds slower. Kahne took third, Kurt Busch fourth, and Keselowski fifth, followed by Kenseth, Gordon, Biffle, Johnson, and Hamlin. The five Chase drivers that did not start in the top ten were 11th-place Earnhardt, 14th-place Newman, 15th-place Stewart, 19th-place Kyle Busch, and 21st-place Harvick. Scott Speed, Reed Sorenson, Skinner, Scott Riggs, and Grant Enfinger failed to qualify for the race. After qualifying, Edwards acknowledged that the pole brought a "morale boost" to his team, but still believed that "we still have to go run this race, and anything can happen."

=== Qualifying results ===
Grid	No.	Driver	Team	Manufacturer	Time	Speed
1	99	Carl Edwards	Roush Fenway Racing	Ford	30.775	175.467
2	56	Martin Truex Jr.	Michael Waltrip Racing	Toyota	30.891	174.808
3	4	Kasey Kahne	Red Bull Racing Team	Toyota	30.931	174.582
4	22	Kurt Busch	Penske Racing	Dodge	30.942	174.520
5	2	Brad Keselowski	Penske Racing	Dodge	30.947	174.492
6	17	Matt Kenseth	Roush Fenway Racing	Ford	30.950	174.475
7	24	Jeff Gordon	Hendrick Motorsports	Chevrolet	30.957	174.436
8	16	Greg Biffle	Roush Fenway Racing	Ford	31.015	174.109
9	48	Jimmie Johnson	Hendrick Motorsports	Chevrolet	31.017	174.098
10	11	Denny Hamlin	Joe Gibbs Racing	Toyota	31.040	173.969
11	88	Dale Earnhardt Jr.	Hendrick Motorsports	Chevrolet	31.051	173.907
12	43	A. J. Allmendinger	Richard Petty Motorsports	Ford	31.082	173.734
13	6	David Ragan	Roush Fenway Racing	Ford	31.092	173.678
14	39	Ryan Newman	Stewart–Haas Racing	Chevrolet	31.147	173.371
15	14	Tony Stewart	Stewart–Haas Racing	Chevrolet	31.154	173.333
16	78	Regan Smith	Furniture Row Racing	Chevrolet	31.156	173.321
17	33	Clint Bowyer	Richard Childress Racing	Chevrolet	31.164	173.277
18	9	Marcos Ambrose	Richard Petty Motorsports	Ford	31.165	173.271
19	18	Kyle Busch	Joe Gibbs Racing	Toyota	31.169	173.249
20	21	Trevor Bayne	Wood Brothers Racing	Ford	31.185	173.160
21	29	Kevin Harvick	Richard Childress Racing	Chevrolet	31.186	173.155
22	51	Landon Cassill	Phoenix Racing	Chevrolet	31.197	173.094
23	27	Paul Menard	Richard Childress Racing	Chevrolet	31.199	173.083
24	83	Brian Vickers	Red Bull Racing Team	Toyota	31.220	172.966
25	5	Mark Martin	Hendrick Motorsports	Chevrolet	31.234	172.889
26	1	Jamie McMurray	Earnhardt Ganassi Racing	Chevrolet	31.268	172.701
27	42	Juan Pablo Montoya	Earnhardt Ganassi Racing	Chevrolet	31.276	172.656
28	00	David Reutimann	Michael Waltrip Racing	Toyota	31.318	172.425
29	84	Cole Whitt	Red Bull Racing Team	Toyota	31.324	172.392
30	55	J. J. Yeley	Front Row Motorsports	Ford	31.397	171.991
31	31	Jeff Burton	Richard Childress Racing	Chevrolet	31.428	171.821
32	20	Joey Logano	Joe Gibbs Racing	Toyota	31.453	171.685
33	66	Michael McDowell	HP Racing	Toyota	31.568	171.059
34	35	Dave Blaney	Tommy Baldwin Racing	Chevrolet	31.574	171.027
35	47	Bobby Labonte	JTG Daugherty Racing	Toyota	31.601	170.881
36	30	David Stremme	Inception Motorsports	Chevrolet	31.601	170.881
37	87	Joe Nemechek	NEMCO Motorsports	Toyota	31.657	170.578
38	34	David Gilliland	Front Row Motorsports	Ford	31.738	170.143
39	13	Casey Mears	Germain Racing	Toyota	31.778	169.929
40	38	Travis Kvapil	Front Row Motorsports	Ford	31.919	169.178
41	32	T. J. Bell	FAS Lane Racing	Ford	32.199	167.707
42	36	Geoffrey Bodine	Tommy Baldwin Racing	Chevrolet	33.161	162.842
43	71	Mike Bliss	TRG Motorsports	Ford	31.776	169.940
Failed to qualify
44	46	Scott Speed	Whitney Motorsports	Ford	31.853	169.529
45	7	Reed Sorenson	Robby Gordon Motorsports	Dodge	31.885	169.359
46	37	Mike Skinner	Max Q Motorsports	Ford	32.031	168.587
47	92	Scott Riggs	K-Automotive Motorsports	Chevrolet	32.186	167.775
48	93	Grant Enfinger	Sinica Motorsports	Chevrolet	32.568	165.807

== Race ==
=== Laps 1–131 ===
Weather conditions towards the beginning of the 267-lap race were windy, with air temperatures at around 75 °F (24 °C). In the United States, the race was broadcast live on ESPN, with commentary from Allen Bestwick, Dale Jarrett, and Andy Petree. Pre-race ceremonies began with an invocation from Pastor Scott Claunch of the Calvary Chapel Fort Lauderdale and a performance of the national anthem from American Idol finalist Pia Toscano. Michelle Obama, the First Lady of the United States, and Jill Biden, wife of Vice President Joe Biden, commanded the drivers to start their engines. Their presence was met with scattered boos from the spectators.

The race began with a standard rolling start at 3:20 p.m. Eastern Standard Time (UTC−05:00). Edwards led the field into turn one as Stewart dove to the inside line to race three-abreast with two other cars. By leading the first lap, Edwards gained a bonus point, which meant that Stewart needed to finish at least four positions ahead of him if he failed to lead a lap. Kenseth had moved up to third place by the third lap. Kurt Busch pulled into the garage on the next lap with a broken drive shaft (he eventually returned to the track on lap 51). By lap five, Earnhardt moved up to seventh place. Stewart improved to eleventh place that same lap, and made his way into the top ten five laps later. Edwards' 0.791-second lead over Truex was diminished when the first yellow flag of the race was issued on the 14th lap for light rainfall in the second turn. All of the leaders made pit stops during the caution period for right-side tires. Montoya exceeded the speed limit on pit road and was forced to enter pit road as a result. Travis Kvapil and Joe Nemechek stayed on-track to lead three laps each before they came in for their stops.

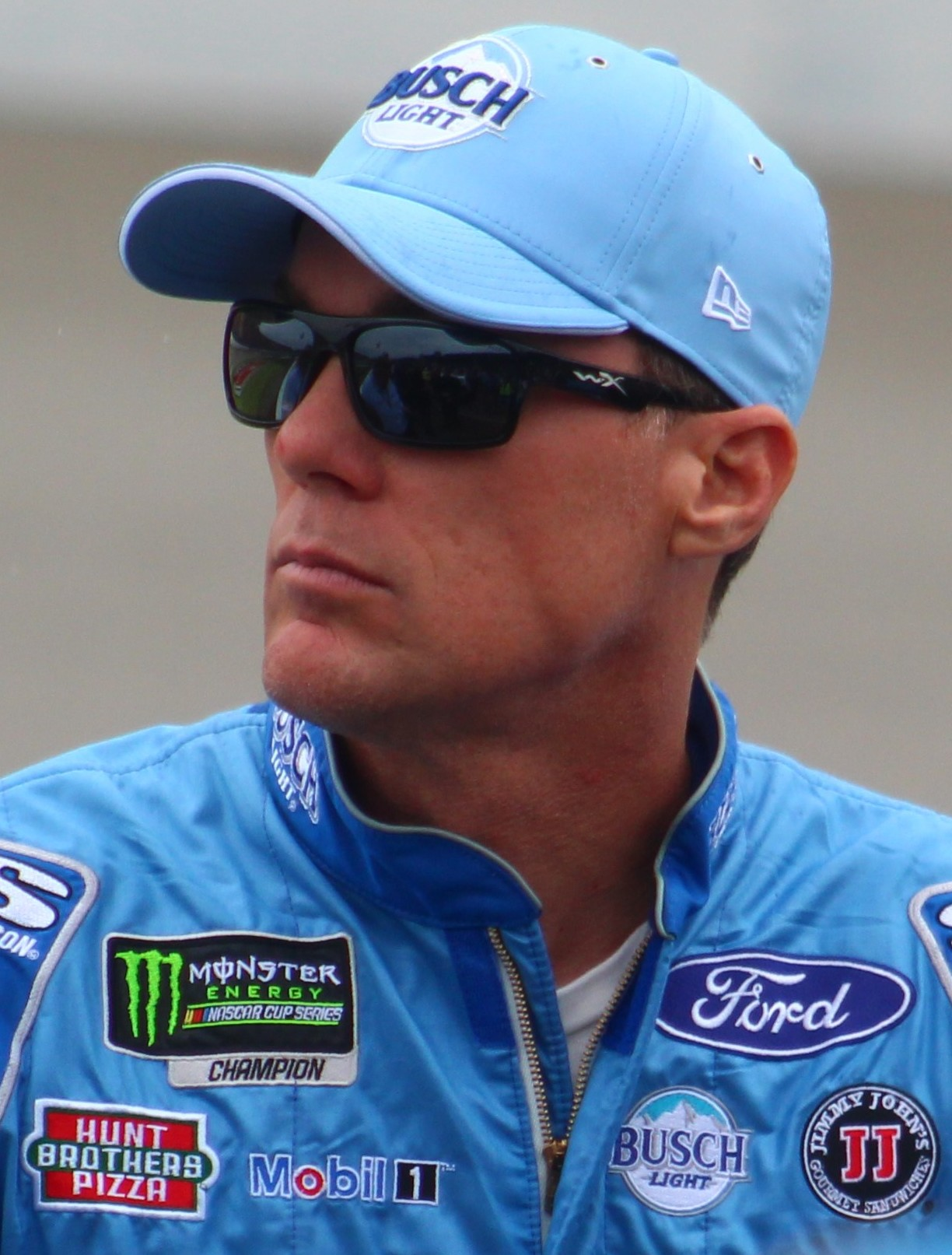
Kevin Harvick (pictured in 2019) finished third in the championship standings.

As jet dryers cleaned the slippery track surface, Stewart made two additional pit stops to replace the fencing on his front grille, which his team suspected had been damaged from hitting pieces of Kurt Busch's transmission. He was dropped from eighth to 40th place when the race was resumed on lap 22, with Edwards leading Truex and Earnhardt. Over the next 13 laps, Johnson moved to fourth place, as did his teammate Gordon to sixth, while Earnhardt challenged Truex for the second position and briefly claimed the position from him on the 25th lap. Stewart also made up 13 positions. The second caution was waved on lap 35 for a spin in turn four involving Blaney. Pit stops were made for four tires and adjustments to the leaders' cars. Stewart's stop was elongated as his team taped his grille in place; despite the setback, he remained confident that he could move up to the front, relaying to his team that the field was going to feel "bad".

Montoya remained on the track to take the lead on lap 36, but Keselowski, who only pitted for right-side tires, passed him at the restart two laps later. Harvick and Edwards quickly displaced Montoya and battled for the second position, with Edwards overtaking Harvick on the 46th lap. A lap later, Stewart continued his charge towards the lead by passing four cars to take 19th. On lap 48, Gordon moved up to third as Edwards took the lead from Keselowski. The gap between the two leaders was 0.676 seconds by lap 53. Meanwhile, Hamlin passed Johnson for tenth on lap 50, only to lose the position to Johnson four laps later. On the 56th lap, Gordon overtook Keselowski for second, but was unable to challenge for the lead, as Edwards had amassed a lead of over two seconds. Several drivers towards the rear of the field gave way for the faster Stewart, who was already in 12th by lap 68.

The first cycle of green-flag pit stops commenced on lap 76. Stewart came in for a stop on the 79th lap, as did leader Edwards one lap later. Kenseth led the 81st lap before coming in, and Johnson remained on-track for an additional two laps prior to his stop, after which he handed the lead back to Edwards. On lap 84, Ragan's engine blew and leaked oil on the track, bringing out the race's third caution flag. Bowyer and a handful of other drivers made their stops during the caution, with Mike Bliss being sent to the rear of the field by NASCAR officials for speeding at the exit of pit road. Ahead of the lap-88 restart, the top-five drivers were Edwards, Gordon, Truex, Earnhardt, and Harvick. Within the next 13 laps, Stewart moved up from tenth to sixth and began closing in on Johnson, who eventually came into pit road on the 105th lap with engine problems, while Harvick drove to third place. Edwards, who led by 0.966 seconds, was instructed by his team to drive his car carefully after two cars that were powered by Roush-Yates Engines (RYE) – Ragan and Marcos Ambrose – developed engine issues throughout the race.

Another rainstorm forced NASCAR officials to throw the caution for the fourth time on lap 109. The red flag was issued shortly thereafter to allow the track to dry. At this point in the race, Edwards had a 12-point advantage over Stewart in the championship. After a delay that lasted one hour and 14 minutes, the track was deemed suitable to race on, and so the red flag was withdrawn for the yellow flag. More pit stops were made for all of the leaders, including Edwards, who lost two positions to Harvick and Gordon. During the lap-117 restart, Gordon overtook Harvick for the lead, while Stewart moved from fourth to second place and Edwards settled into third place. Stewart pulled alongside Gordon on the 121st lap and claimed the lead for the first time two laps later. On lap 124, Kyle Busch and Earnhardt battled for the seventh position, with the former holding off the latter exiting the fourth corner. Six laps later, Edwards took the second position from Gordon.

=== Laps 132–267 ===
Trevor Bayne contacted the turn-four wall on the 132nd lap. The debris that expelled from his car necessitated the fifth caution flag three laps later. During the pit stops, Stewart dropped eight positions because his team struggled to screw off his lug nuts. Harvick, who only took two fresh tires rather than four, led at the restart on lap 139. Stewart fell two further places to 11th after steering out of line with the other drivers as Edwards drove to Newman's bumper to attempt a pass for second place. Four laps later, David Gilliland spun Johnson at the fourth turn to bring out the caution for the sixth time, by which point Truex moved into second, Newman was demoted to fourth, and Stewart reclaimed ninth. During the caution, Johnson lost a lap to the leaders, none of whom elected to make a stop. Truex swerved to the inside line to claim the lead from Harvick at the lap-147 restart. Edwards did not fire off as quick as his fellow competitors and fell to seventh, while Stewart quickly moved to second place by the 152nd lap. He then passed Truex for the lead before the seventh caution was flown three laps later for Cassill spinning into Whitt and Bayne.

Stewart was again set back by a blunder during pit stops, this time because a lug nut got stuck in the socket as the right-rear tire was being placed, and dropped to ninth place. Jeff Burton and Earnhardt stayed on-track to assume the top-two positions for the restart on lap 161. Kenseth quickly passed them both for the lead; behind him, Stewart ran four-wide to take the seventh position and Edwards moved to fifth place. By lap 165, Edwards and Stewart found themselves in third and fourth, respectively. Stewart bumped into the rear of Edwards' car, prompting a warning from NASCAR officials. The two championship contenders reeled in Truex for the second position and Edwards even made an attempt to pass him on lap 169. Truex was able to defend his spot until the 174th lap.

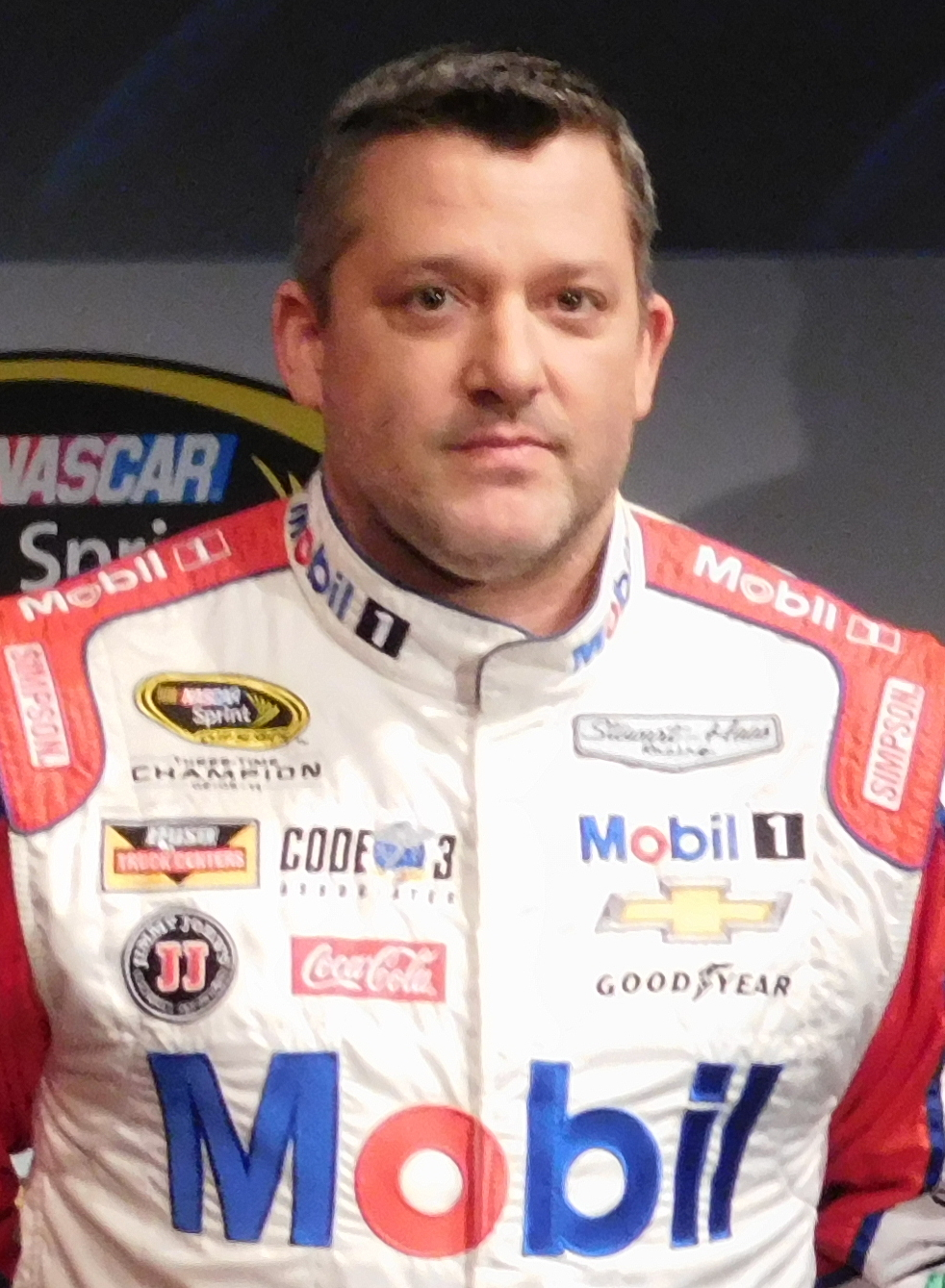
Tony Stewart (pictured in 2016) earned his third Sprint Cup Series championship by winning the race.

On the next lap, Kenseth let his teammate Edwards by for the lead. Stewart moved to third place on lap 176 and overtook Kenseth for second four laps later, though he trailed Edwards by 1.449 seconds. On lap 183, Stewart made up two tenths of a second on Edwards' lead as he almost lost control of his car in turn four. Three laps later, Edwards secured an additional bonus point for leading the most laps in the race. The second cycle of green-flag pit stops began on the 190th lap, with Biffle pulling in three laps later for an engine failure, the third RYE-powered car to endure this problem. Edwards finally came in for his stop on lap 202. Stewart thus inherited the lead, but was instructed to drive more conservatively by his crew chief Darian Grubb in order to complete the race with one less stop than Edwards. By the time Stewart came into pit road for fuel and four new tires on the 212th lap, his car had nearly ran out of fuel.

The caution was thrown for the eighth (and final) time on lap 214 for another rain shower. Edwards had already picked up the lead, but because he was predicted to run out of fuel with seven laps left, he entered pit road to fill up his fuel tank and two fresh tires. Edwards' team raised concerns over whether he would make it without having to stop again, but the concerns were negated as the caution lasted 17 laps while NASCAR officials waited to determine if the track was dry enough. At this point in the race, Edwards' championship advantage over Stewart had dwindled to just two points. The race resumed on lap 231 with Kyle Busch and Keselowski in the top-two, as neither of them chose to pit under caution, with Stewart in third, Bowyer fourth, and Edwards fifth. The title contenders immediately charged towards the front, with Stewart driving alongside Busch and Keselowski in turn two to take the lead, while Edwards improved to third and eventually second on the inside line in turn two on lap 235.

During the final 37-lap stint to the checkered flag, Stewart drove on the high side of the track and nearly slid into the wall in the process. His and Edwards' lap times were nearly identical, but the slower lapped cars ahead of Stewart allowed Edwards to reel him in to as low as eight tenths of a second. However, all of Edwards' attempts to overtake Stewart were in vain, as he drove away to his third win at Homestead, his fifth of the season – all in the Chase for the Sprint Cup – and the 44th of his career. In addition, Stewart won his third Drivers' Championship on account of a tiebreaker, the first in Sprint Cup Series history, that was determined by wins in the season: Stewart won five races and Edwards won only one. He became the first owner–driver to win the Sprint Cup Series title since Alan Kulwicki in 1992. He made a total of 118 passes on his competitors throughout the race. Truex took third place, Kenseth fourth, and Gordon fifth; Bowyer, Kahne, Harvick, Hamlin, and Burton completed the top-ten. During the course of the race, the lead was changed 26 times between 15 different drivers, both of which were record-highs for the series at Homestead–Miami Speedway. Edwards led 119 laps, more than any other driver, while race winner Stewart led four times for a total of 65 laps.

=== Post-race ===
"Are you kidding me? We said all week we'd just go out and win the race and didn't have to worry about what (Edwards) did. If this doesn't go down as one of the greatest championship battles in history, I don't know what will."

— Tony Stewart after earning his third Sprint Cup Series title.

As rain fell over the track again, three-time Sprint Cup Series titlist Stewart celebrated his race victory, which earned him $341,258, with his team in victory lane in front of a crowd of 73,000 people. He said of his championship in a press conference, "I would have lost every bet in the world if people would have said, hey, when you got in the Chase, that we were going to win a race or we were going to win five races and win this thing; I would have bet against us. And I learned a big lesson with our organization and, you know, how strong a program we have and people-wise. I mean, everybody has good cars and good equipment, but you know, I'm sure Darian (Grubb)'s mentioned it, it's the people you have that make the difference."

Stewart's crew chief Grubb, who had been informed five weeks prior that he was fired from the Stewart–Haas Racing team, addressed his status for the 2012 season: "I’m not sure what’s going to happen. But I was told early in the Chase before Charlotte that next year I was not going to be here. We just kept fighting and doing everything we had to do every week." Despite guiding Stewart–Haas Racing to the championship, he did not return to the team the next year and was instead hired by Joe Gibbs Racing as Hamlin's crew chief. A disappointed Edwards congratulated Stewart on his title, "I just have to say congratulations to Tony. Those guys earned it. They won half the races in the Chase and he is the champion and did a good job. My guys did a great job. We pushed him to the end and that is all I got. That is as hard as I can drive." He added: "So I told my wife, if I can't win this thing I'll be the best loser NASCAR has ever had."

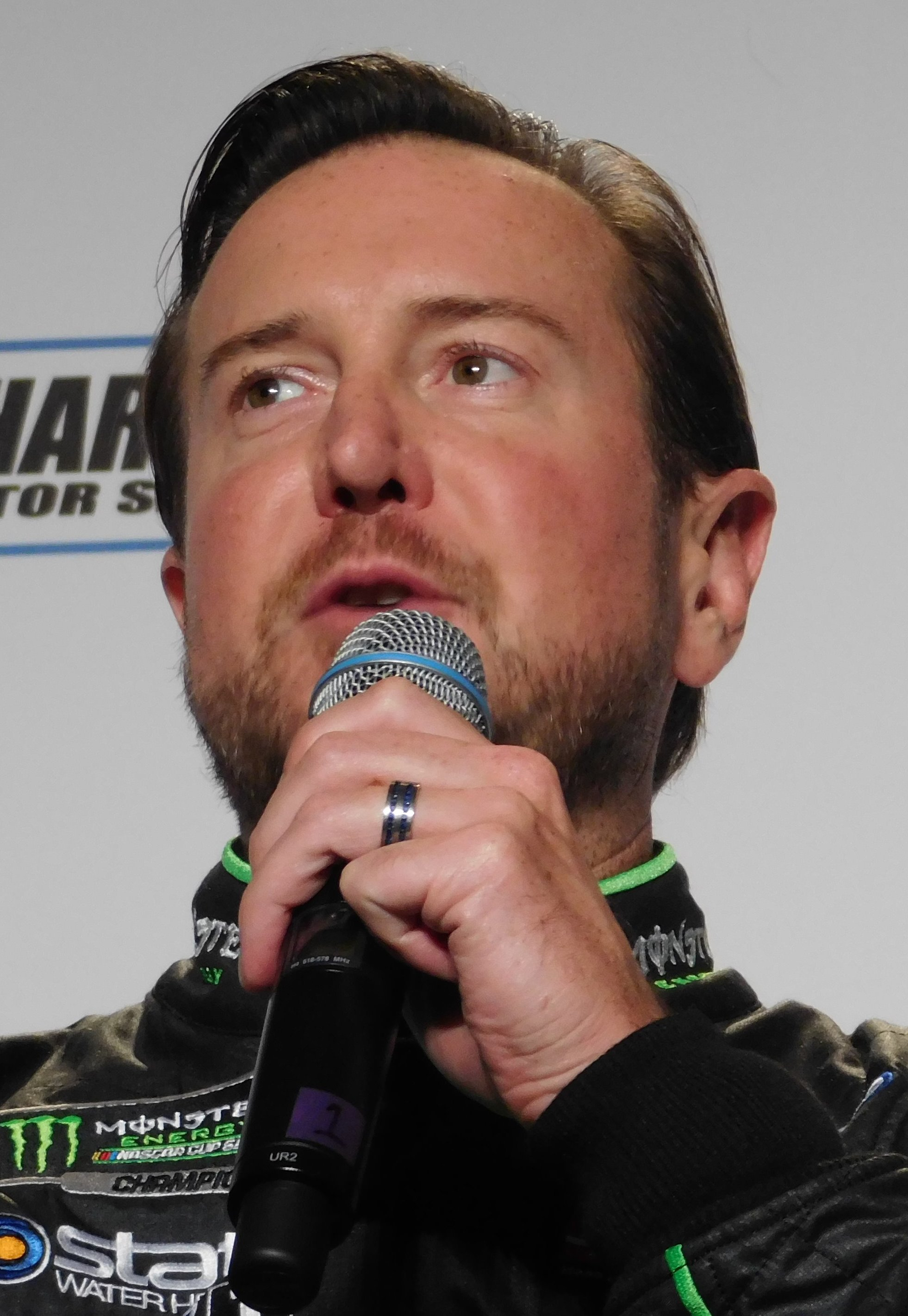
Kurt Busch (pictured in 2017) verbally abused a reporter in the garage area and was fined by NASCAR as a result.

Kurt Busch was extremely frustrated with his early mechanical issues, so much so that he gave the finger to a track official as he drove to the garage, which was caught on the ESPN broadcast of the race. ESPN reporter Jerry Punch approached him at his garage stall to obtain a live interview, which only annoyed him further. When Punch mentioned that pieces of Busch's car possibly damaged Stewart's grille, Busch sarcastically responded, "That just makes me feel a lot better, Doctor," before directing an expletive-laden rant at Punch and an ESPN cameraman. They both eventually walked away without conducting the interview. The incident was recorded on a fan's cellphone camera and uploaded to YouTube. Busch's team, Penske Racing, issued an apology to Punch and reprimanded Busch for his "inappropriate actions," while he released his own apology several hours later, explaining: "In my frustration with the loss of my transmission early in the race, I let my emotions get the better of me." NASCAR fined Busch $50,000 for "poor judgment in making an inappropriate hand gesture" and showing "disrespect to a media member".

The race was instantly lauded as one of the best title-deciders in NASCAR history by members of the media and fans, along with the season as a whole. Mike Hembree of Speed Channel wrote of a race that "will be remembered as one of the most riveting in the sport’s history," while fellow Speed Channel journalist Tom Jensen believed that the 2011 season would be compared to other historic seasons such as 1967, 1990, and 1992. Former crew chief Larry McReynolds stated: "I think we are going to have a number of years pass before we can truly and fully appreciate what we witnessed this season." Stewart's childhood idol, four-time Indianapolis 500 winner A. J. Foyt, said that "Tony drove the best race of his life," a compliment which nearly brought Stewart to tears. On Twitter, three-time Sprint Cup champion Darrell Waltrip declared that Stewart went "from hero to legend" with his third title. In 2023, the race was included in NASCAR's list of their 75 Greatest Races in honor of the sport's 75th anniversary.

The season ended with Stewart and Edwards sharing the Drivers' Championship lead on 2,403 points each, but Stewart was declared the champion by virtue of earning more wins than Edwards in the 2011 season. Harvick remained in third place with 2,345 points, 15 more than Kenseth in fourth place and 26 more than fifth-placed Keselowski. Because of his engine issues, Johnson was demoted to sixth in the standings with 2,304 points, the first time in his career that he finished a season outside of the top-five. Earnhardt came in seventh place (2,290 points), followed by Gordon (2,287), Hamlin and Newman (both on 2,284), Kurt Busch (2,262), and Kyle Busch (2,246). Chevrolet concluded their season with 248 points, widening their gap over Ford to 53 points. Toyota came in third with 187 points, and Dodge was fourth on 162. 6.799 million people watched the race on television in the United States, marking the largest viewership for a Sprint Cup Series broadcast on ESPN. The race took three hours and 29 minutes to complete, and the margin of victory was 1.306 seconds.

=== Race results ===
Pos	Grid	No.	Driver	Team	Manufacturer	Laps	Points
1	15	14	Tony Stewart	Stewart–Haas Racing	Chevrolet	267	47^{1}^{3}
2	1	99	Carl Edwards	Roush Fenway Racing	Ford	267	44^{1}^{2}
3	2	56	Martin Truex Jr.	Michael Waltrip Racing	Toyota	267	42^{1}
4	6	17	Matt Kenseth	Roush Fenway Racing	Ford	267	41^{1}
5	7	24	Jeff Gordon	Hendrick Motorsports	Chevrolet	267	40^{1}
6	17	33	Clint Bowyer	Richard Childress Racing	Chevrolet	267	38
7	3	4	Kasey Kahne	Red Bull Racing Team	Toyota	267	37
8	21	29	Kevin Harvick	Richard Childress Racing	Chevrolet	267	37^{1}
9	10	11	Denny Hamlin	Joe Gibbs Racing	Toyota	267	35
10	31	31	Jeff Burton	Richard Childress Racing	Chevrolet	267	35^{1}
11	11	88	Dale Earnhardt Jr.	Hendrick Motorsports	Chevrolet	267	33
12	14	39	Ryan Newman	Stewart–Haas Racing	Chevrolet	267	32
13	16	78	Regan Smith	Furniture Row Racing	Chevrolet	267	31
14	26	1	Jamie McMurray	Earnhardt Ganassi Racing	Chevrolet	267	30
15	12	43	A. J. Allmendinger	Richard Petty Motorsports	Ford	267	29
16	23	27	Paul Menard	Richard Childress Racing	Chevrolet	267	28
17	24	83	Brian Vickers	Red Bull Racing Team	Toyota	267	27
18	28	00	David Reutimann	Michael Waltrip Racing	Toyota	267	26
19	32	20	Joey Logano	Joe Gibbs Racing	Toyota	267	25
20	5	2	Brad Keselowski	Penske Racing	Dodge	266	25^{1}
21	43	71	Mike Bliss	TRG Motorsports	Ford	266	0^{4}
22	40	38	Travis Kvapil	Front Row Motorsports	Ford	266	0^{4}
23	19	18	Kyle Busch	Joe Gibbs Racing	Toyota	266	22^{1}
24	25	5	Mark Martin	Hendrick Motorsports	Chevrolet	266	20
25	20	21	Trevor Bayne	Wood Brothers Racing	Ford	266	0^{4}
26	39	13	Casey Mears	Germain Racing	Toyota	266	18
27	35	47	Bobby Labonte	JTG Daugherty Racing	Toyota	266	17
28	34	35	Dave Blaney	Tommy Baldwin Racing	Chevrolet	265	16
29	41	32	T. J. Bell	FAS Lane Racing	Ford	265	15
30	42	36	Geoffrey Bodine	Tommy Baldwin Racing	Chevrolet	263	14
31	27	42	Juan Pablo Montoya	Earnhardt Ganassi Racing	Chevrolet	261	14^{1}
32	9	48	Jimmie Johnson	Hendrick Motorsports	Chevrolet	261	13^{1}
33	38	34	David Gilliland	Front Row Motorsports	Ford	245	12^{1}
34	4	22	Kurt Busch	Penske Racing	Dodge	220	10
35	8	16	Greg Biffle	Roush Fenway Racing	Ford	190	10^{1}
36	22	51	Landon Cassill	Phoenix Racing	Chevrolet	153	0^{4}
37	29	84	Cole Whitt	Red Bull Racing Team	Toyota	153	0^{4}
38	13	6	David Ragan	Roush Fenway Racing	Ford	81	6
39	18	9	Marcos Ambrose	Richard Petty Motorsports	Ford	72	5
40	37	87	Joe Nemechek	NEMCO Motorsports	Toyota	29	0^{4}
41	30	55	J. J. Yeley	Front Row Motorsports	Ford	25	3
42	36	30	David Stremme	Inception Motorsports	Chevrolet	14	2
43	33	66	Michael McDowell	HP Racing	Toyota	13	1
^{1} Includes one bonus point for leading a lap^{2} Includes one bonus point for leading the most laps^{3} Includes three bonus points for winning the race^{4} Deemed ineligible to earn points in the Sprint Cup Series

== Standings after the race ==
Drivers' Championship standings
Pos	+/–	Driver	Points
1	1	**Tony Stewart**	**2,403**
2	1	Carl Edwards	2,403 (−0)
3		Kevin Harvick	2,345 (−58)
4	2	Matt Kenseth	2,330 (−73)
5	1	Brad Keselowski	2,319 (−84)
6	1	Jimmie Johnson	2,304 (−99)
7		Dale Earnhardt Jr.	2,290 (−113)
8	3	Jeff Gordon	2,287 (−116)
9	1	Denny Hamlin	2,284 (−119)
10	1	Ryan Newman	2,284 (−119)
11	3	Kurt Busch	2,262 (−141)
12		Kyle Busch	2,246 (−157)

- Note: Only the top twelve positions are included for the driver standings. These drivers qualified for the Chase for the Sprint Cup.
- **Bold text** indicates the season's champions.

Manufacturers' Championship standings
Pos	+/–	Manufacturer	Points
1		**Chevrolet**	**248**
2		Ford	195 (−53)
3		Toyota	187 (−61)
4		Dodge	162 (−86)

Previous race: 2011 Kobalt Tools 500	Sprint Cup Series; 2011 season	Next race: 2012 Daytona 500
