= Calvary Christian Academy (Florida) =

Christian private school in Fort Lauderdale, Florida, United States

- Educating Tomorrow's Leaders for Christ

Location
- 2401 West Cypress Creek Rd; Fort Lauderdale, Florida; United States
- 26°12′14.36″N 80°10′31.98″W

Information
- Type: Private School
- Motto: Make Disciples
- Established: 2000
- President: Dr. Jason Rachels
- Lower School Headmaster: Joseph Wilson
- Upper School Headmaster: Aaron Mills
- Teaching staff: 169
- Grades: PreK3–12
- Enrollment: 1,952
- Colors: Navy, white, and gold
- Mascot: Eagles
- Nickname: CCA
- Accreditation: Cognia, Association of Christian Schools International (ACSI), Southern Association of Colleges and Schools (SACS), Gold Seal Quality of Care by DCF's Child Care Services
- Affiliation: Calvary Chapel Fort Lauderdale
- Website: http://ccaeagles.org

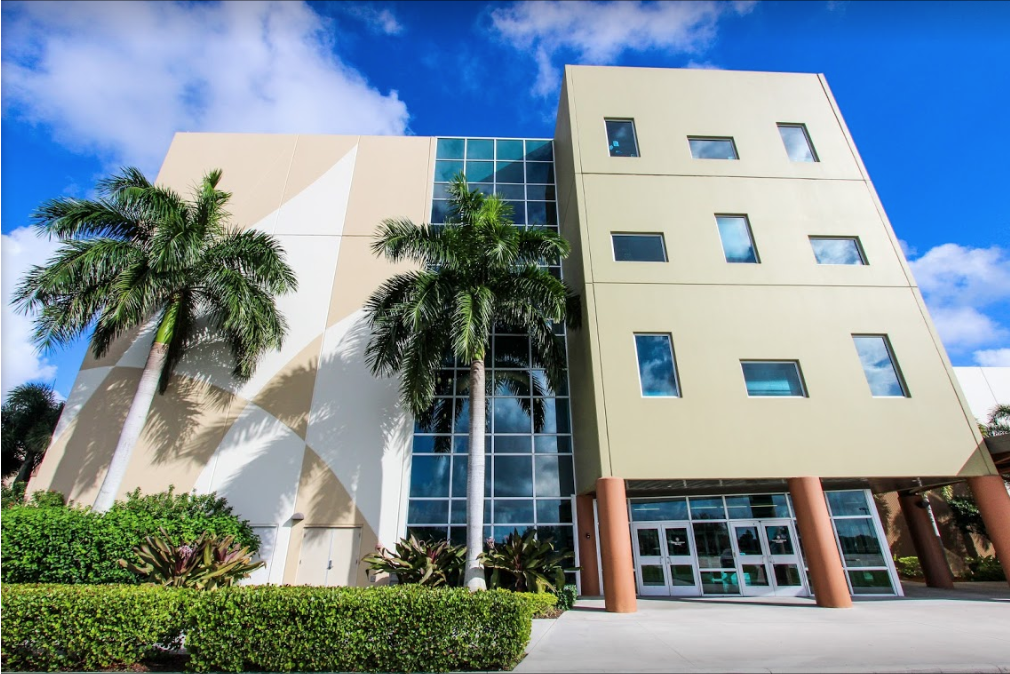
Front view of the main school building.

Calvary Christian Academy (CCA) is a private Christian school located in Fort Lauderdale, Florida, United States. It was established as a ministry of Calvary Chapel Fort Lauderdale in 2000. CCA provides education from Pre-K3 through 12th grade. A full-time daycare is also operated all year. The school is accredited with the Association of Christian Schools International. The student population totals to more than 1,900 and the student teacher ratio is 12:1.

== Academics ==
With an emphasis on both academia and biblical applications, CCA has developed a custom set of academic standards that meet or exceed state and national standards, derived from the following:

- Liberty Christian Academy academic standards
- Florida Department of Education standards
- International Society for Technology in Education standards
- American Council on the Teaching of Foreign Languages standards
- Curriculum Planning and Learning Management Systems standards
- Department of Defense standards

Students of every grade level have study of the Bible integrated into the curriculum, along with core academic classes.

=== High school ===
The high school offers 35 Dual Enrollment (DE) and Advanced Placement (AP) courses offered across all academic disciplines. Students are required to take one full credit of Bible for each year in attendance at CCA. Students have the option to participate in Endorsements, areas of special academic emphasis that require additional courses and/or extracurricular activities. Endorsement programs include Fine Arts, Ministry, STEM, and World Language.

=== Elementary school ===
The elementary school curriculum focuses on five areas: Bible, Math, English, Science, and Social Studies. Students then participate in "weekly specials" that include Fine Arts, Music, Physical Education, Spanish, and STEM. An optional Spanish Immersion Program through add.a.lingua] was introduced in the 2017–2018 school year where core classes are taught in Spanish with the goal of helping students become bilingual.

== Tuition ==
Tuition varies by grade level. Tuition for the 2021-2022 academic year for high school students is $14,425. Tuition assistance is available by application, and the school also accepts external scholarships including: Step Up for Students Scholarship, Gardiner Scholarship (PLSA), John McKay Scholarship, and Folds of Honor.

== Campus ==
CCA sits on a 75-acre campus shared with Calvary Chapel Fort Lauderdale. The grounds host a football field, track, indoor gymnasium, blackbox theatre, and a 700-seat theatre. At the end of the 2017-2018 academic year, the school began a major security system upgrade, adding 240 security cameras across the campus.

== Athletics ==
CCA is member of the Florida High School Athletic Association (FHSAA). It provides competitive athletic sports for grades 6-12, as well as after-school intramural sports for elementary students.

=== Athletic teams ===
The school has 55+ interscholastic athletic teams across 18 different sports for students in grades 6-12. School mascot is the Eagle, which is inspired by Isaiah 40:31.

Boys High School	Boys Middle School	Girls High School	Girls Middle School
Baseball	Baseball	Basketball	Basketball
Basketball	Basketball	Beach Volleyball	
Cross country		Cheer	Cheer
Football	Football	Cross Country	
Golf	Golf	Golf	
Lacrosse	Lacrosse	Lacrosse	Lacrosse
Tennis		Tennis	
Track & Field	Track & Field	Track & Field	Track & Field
Soccer	Soccer	Soccer	Soccer
Swimming & Diving	Swimming & Diving	Softball	
		Swimming & Diving	Swimming & Diving
Volleyball		Volleyball	Volleyball

=== Titles ===
The school has won the 2017 State Champions in volleyball and basketball, the 2012 1A state title for girls Track and Field, along with the 2016 State Champions in baseball.

== Notable alumni ==
- Luke Jackson (born 1991), baseball pitcher for the San Francisco Giants
- Greg Mabin (born 1994), American football player for the Iowa Hawkeyes and in the NFL
- Jake Eder (born 1998), baseball pitcher in the Chicago White Sox organization
- Christian Scott (born 1999), baseball pitcher in the New York Mets organization
- Taylor Hendricks (born 2003), American basketball player for the Utah Jazz

== Notable staff ==
- Bob Coy (1985-2014) - Founding Pastor
