= 2009 Ford 400 =

Race details
- Race 36 of 36 in the 2009 NASCAR Sprint Cup Series
- Map of Homestead–Miami Speedway. Gray dashed lines are other courses. Gray solid line is another pit road option.
- Date: November 22, 2009
- Location: Homestead–Miami Speedway, Homestead, Florida
- Course: Permanent racing facility
- Course length: 1.5 miles (2.4 km)
- Distance: 267 laps, 400.5 mi (644.542 km)
- Weather: Warm with temperatures approaching 83.1 °F (28.4 °C); wind speeds up to 7 miles per hour (11 km/h)
- Average speed: 126.986 miles per hour (204.364 km/h)

Pole position
Driver	Jimmie Johnson	Hendrick Motorsports
- Time: 31.049

Most laps led
Driver	Denny Hamlin	Joe Gibbs Racing
- Laps: 71

Winner
No. 11	Denny Hamlin	Joe Gibbs Racing

Television in the United States
- Network: ABC
- Announcers: Dale Jarrett, Andy Petree, Jerry Punch
- Nielsen ratings: 3.3/6 (Final); 3.2/6 (Overnight); (5.607 million)

The 2009 Ford 400 was the thirty-sixth and final stock car race of the 2009 NASCAR Sprint Cup Series as well as the tenth and final race of the season-ending Chase for the Sprint Cup. It was held on November 22, 2009, at Homestead–Miami Speedway, in Homestead, Florida, before a crowd of 70,000 people. The 267-lap race was won by Denny Hamlin of the Joe Gibbs Racing team after starting from thirty-eighth position. Richard Childress Racing driver Jeff Burton finished second and his teammate Kevin Harvick was third.

Going into the race only Hendrick Motorsports teammates Jimmie Johnson and Mark Martin remained in contention to win the Drivers' Championship, with Johnson leading Martin by 108 points. Johnson won the pole position by setting the fastest lap in qualifying, and he maintained his lead on the first lap of the race. Many Chase for the Sprint Cup participants, including Johnson, Kurt Busch and Mark Martin, were in the top ten for most of the race, although some encountered problems in the closing laps. Kyle Busch was leading the race with forty-six laps remaining, giving the lead to Hamlin on lap 223 who maintained it to win the race. There were seven cautions in the race, as well as eighteen lead changes among ten different drivers.

The race was Hamlin's fourth win in the 2009 season, and the eighth of his career. Johnson became the first driver to win four consecutive Drivers' Championships and was 141 points ahead of Mark Martin. Johnson's team owner Jeff Gordon won the Owners' Championship. Chevrolet won the Manufacturers' Championship with 262 points, fifty-five points ahead of Toyota and ninety-eight ahead of Ford. The race attracted 5.60 million television viewers.

== Background ==
Homestead–Miami Speedway, where the race was held.

The Ford 400 was the 36th and final race of the 2009 NASCAR Sprint Cup Series and the last of the ten-race season-ending Chase for the Sprint Cup. It was held on November 22, 2009, in Homestead, Florida, at Homestead–Miami Speedway, an intermediate track that holds NASCAR races. The race was held on the standard track at Homestead–Miami Speedway; a four-turn oval track that is 1.5 miles (2.4 km) long. The track's turns are banked from 18 to 20 degrees, and both the front stretch (the location of the finish line) and the back stretch are banked at three degrees.

Before the final race of the season, Jimmie Johnson led the Drivers' Championship with 6,492 points; Mark Martin was second with 6,384 points, 92 points behind Johnson. A maximum of 195 points were available for the final race. Johnson could win the title if he finished 25th or higher, while Martin had to win the race and for Johnson to place 30th. Behind Johnson and Martin in the Drivers' Championship, Jeff Gordon was third with 6,323, and Kurt Busch was fourth with 6,281 points. Gordon would be mathematically eliminated from winning the championship when the race commenced. Chevrolet had already secured the Manufacturer's Championship, and entered the race on 256 points, 58 points ahead of Toyota on 198 points, with a maximum of nine points available at the Ford 400. Carl Edwards was the race's defending champion.

In the title battle, Johnson had achieved seven wins, fifteen top-five finishes, and twenty-three top ten placings over the course of the season; he was vying to become the first driver to win four consecutive Cup Series championships while his teammate Martin would be the oldest driver to claim the title. Johnson commented on his mindset: "I am out of emotion, There is no emotion. It's all business. It's about showing up tomorrow, putting in the best lap I can, driving the car as hard as can I on Saturday, making sure the car is set up right, and doing my job on Sunday. I am not allowing my mind to slip any." Martin said he had an unchanged mindset for each race in 2009 and was unworried about his championship prospects: "I'm sure that we could wind up fourth in the points, which is something no one has even considered. But I'm not thinking about that. I'm neither worried about that or Jimmie."

A total of 48 cars were entered for the event with two changes of driver. David Stremme, who had been replaced Brad Keselowski as the driver Penske Championship Racing's No. 12 entry, signed to race the No. 9 Phoenix Racing car for the Ford 400. Matt Crafton drove the No. 7 Robby Gordon Motorsports vehicle during practice and qualifying in place of Robby Gordon, who was racing in the 2009 Baja 1000 (part of the SCORE International Off-Road Championship) in his attempt to win the Trophy Truck Division and overall championship titles.

== Practice and qualifying ==
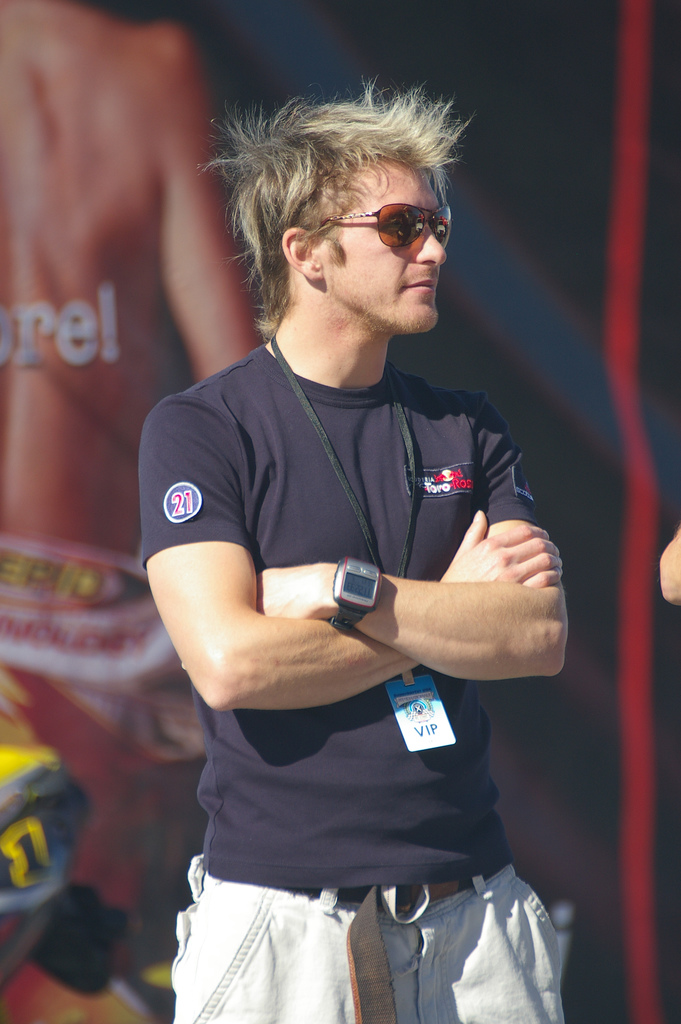
Scott Speed qualified on the front row of the grid.

Three practice sessions were held before the Sunday race—one on Friday, and two on Saturday. The first session lasted 90 minutes, and the second 45 minutes. The final session lasted 60 minutes. In the first practice session, Kurt Busch was fastest with a lap of 31.136 seconds, placing ahead of Juan Pablo Montoya in second and Clint Bowyer in third. Ryan Newman took fourth position and Joey Logano placed fifth. Tony Stewart, Edwards, Dale Earnhardt Jr., Kevin Harvick and David Reutimann rounded out the top ten fastest drivers in the session. Montoya lost control of his car exiting the fourth turn, and spun down the frontstretch but avoided sustaining damage to his vehicle.

A total of forty-eight drivers were entered in the qualifier on Friday afternoon; due to NASCAR's qualifying procedure, forty-three were allowed to race. Each driver ran two laps, with the starting order determined by the competitor's fastest times. Johnson clinched his fourth pole position of the season, with a time of 31.049 seconds that was recorded due to his qualifying late and track conditions improving. He was joined on the grid's front row by Scott Speed, his joint-highest qualifying starting position of his career. Marcos Ambrose qualified third and held second until Speed set his fastest lap. Martin took fourth when the circuit temperature was at its warmest and held the pole until Johnson's lap. Stewart started fifth. Harvick, Newman, Greg Biffle, Bill Elliott and Bowyer completed the top ten fastest qualifiers. Kurt Busch, one of the drivers in the Chase for the Sprint Cup, qualified twelfth, while Jeff Gordon set the twentieth fastest time. Terry Labonte in 43rd used a Champion's Provisional to qualify for the race. The five drivers who failed to qualify were Joe Nemechek, Dave Blaney, Mike Skinner, Max Papis and Stremme. Reed Sorenson, Skinner and Stremme lost control of their cars during qualifying, and Crafton's engine failed at the conclusion of his second timed lap. After the qualifier Johnson said, "I had a talk with myself to do what I could today and don't freak out if it's not as good as what Mark [Martin] ran. I kept my emotions in check and drove the car with the right touch and feel, and that comes from being relaxed, so it went well."

On Saturday morning, Martin was fastest with a time of 32.109 seconds in the second practice session, ahead of Denny Hamlin in second, and Johnson in third. Newman was fourth quickest, and Kyle Busch took fifth. Jeff Burton managed sixth. Biffle, Kasey Kahne, Joey Logano and Martin Truex Jr. followed in the top ten. Of the other drivers in the Chase, Jeff Gordon finished with the seventeenth fastest time, while Stewart set the twenty-fourth fastest time. Erik Darnell damaged his car's right-hand side against the barrier. Burton paced the final practice session with a 32.582 seconds lap, with Harvick and Martin second and third respectively. Truex was fourth fastest, ahead of Newman and Logano. Johnson was scored seventh, Casey Mears eighth, Brad Keselowski ninth and Hamlin tenth. The other Chase drivers, Jeff Gordon and Kurt Busch were scored fifteenth and eleventh respectively.

=== Qualifying results ===
Grid	Car	Driver	Team	Manufacturer	Time	Speed
1	48	Jimmie Johnson	Hendrick Motorsports	Chevrolet	31.049	173.319
2	82	Scott Speed	Red Bull Racing Team	Toyota	31.269	172.695
3	47	Marcos Ambrose	JTG Daugherty Racing	Toyota	31.272	172.678
4	5	Mark Martin	Hendrick Motorsports	Chevrolet	31.331	172.353
5	14	Tony Stewart	Stewart–Haas Racing	Chevrolet	31.351	172.243
6	29	Kevin Harvick	Richard Childress Racing	Chevrolet	31.369	172.145
7	39	Ryan Newman	Stewart–Haas Racing	Chevrolet	31.389	172.035
8	16	Greg Biffle	Roush Fenway Racing	Ford	31.391	172.024
9	21	Bill Elliott	Wood Brothers Racing	Ford	31.421	171.860
10	33	Clint Bowyer	Richard Childress Racing	Chevrolet	31.425	171.838
11	26	Jamie McMurray	Roush Fenway Racing	Ford	31.425	171.838
12	2	Kurt Busch	Penske Championship Racing	Dodge	31.433	171.794
13	44	A. J. Allmendinger	Richard Petty Motorsports	Ford	31.441	171.750
14	1	Martin Truex Jr.	Earnhardt Ganassi Racing	Chevrolet	31.460	171.646
15	07	Casey Mears	Richard Childress Racing	Chevrolet	31.463	171.630
16	78	Regan Smith	Furniture Row Racing	Chevrolet	31.473	171.576
17	02	David Gilliland	Joe Gibbs Racing	Toyota	31.494	171.461
18	36	Michael McDowell	Tommy Baldwin Racing	Toyota	31.499	171.434
19	71	Bobby Labonte	TRG Motorsports	Chevrolet	31.506	171.396
20	24	Jeff Gordon	Hendrick Motorsports	Chevrolet	31.517	171.336
21	19	Elliott Sadler	Richard Petty Motorsports	Dodge	31.518	171.331
22	00	David Reutimann	Michael Waltrip Racing	Toyota	31.528	171.276
23	42	Juan Pablo Montoya	Earnhardt Ganassi Racing	Chevrolet	31.549	171.162
24	99	Carl Edwards	Roush Fenway Racing	Ford	31.580	170.994
25	9	Kasey Kahne	Richard Petty Motorsports	Dodge	31.585	170.967
26	31	Jeff Burton	Richard Childress Racing	Chevrolet	31.585	170.967
27	12	Brad Keselowski	Penske Championship Racing	Dodge	31.613	170.816
28	37	Travis Kvapil	Front Row Motorsports	Chevrolet	31.615	170.805
29	77	Sam Hornish Jr.	Penske Championship Racing	Dodge	31.617	170.794
30	18	Kyle Busch	Joe Gibbs Racing	Toyota	31.644	170.648
31	96	Erik Darnell	Hall of Fame Racing	Ford	31.666	170.530
32	88	Dale Earnhardt Jr.	Hendrick Motorsports	Chevrolet	31.680	170.454
33	83	Brian Vickers	Red Bull Racing Team	Toyota	31.688	170.411
34	17	Matt Kenseth	Roush Fenway Racing	Ford	31.694	170.379
35	20	Joey Logano	Joe Gibbs Racing	Toyota	31.714	170.272
36	98	Paul Menard	Robert Yates Racing	Ford	31.715	170.266
37	7	Matt Crafton	Robby Gordon Motorsports	Toyota	31.787	169.881
38	11	Denny Hamlin	Joe Gibbs Racing	Toyota	31.818	169.715
39	55	Michael Waltrip	Michael Waltrip Racing	Toyota	31.886	169.353
40	34	John Andretti	Front Row Motorsports	Chevrolet	31.901	169.274
41	6	David Ragan	Roush Fenway Racing	Ford	31.939	169.072
42	43	Reed Sorenson	Richard Petty Motorsports	Dodge	31.952	169.003
43	08	Terry Labonte	Carter Simo Racing	Toyota	Champion's Provisional	
Failed to qualify
44	87	Joe Nemechek	NEMCO Motorsports	Toyota	31.633	170.708
45	66	Dave Blaney	Prism Motorsports	Toyota	31.964	168.940
46	70	Mike Skinner	TRG Motorsports	Chevrolet	32.017	168.660
47	13	Max Papis	Germain Racing	Toyota	32.042	168.529
48	09	David Stremme	Phoenix Racing	Chevrolet	–	–

== Race ==
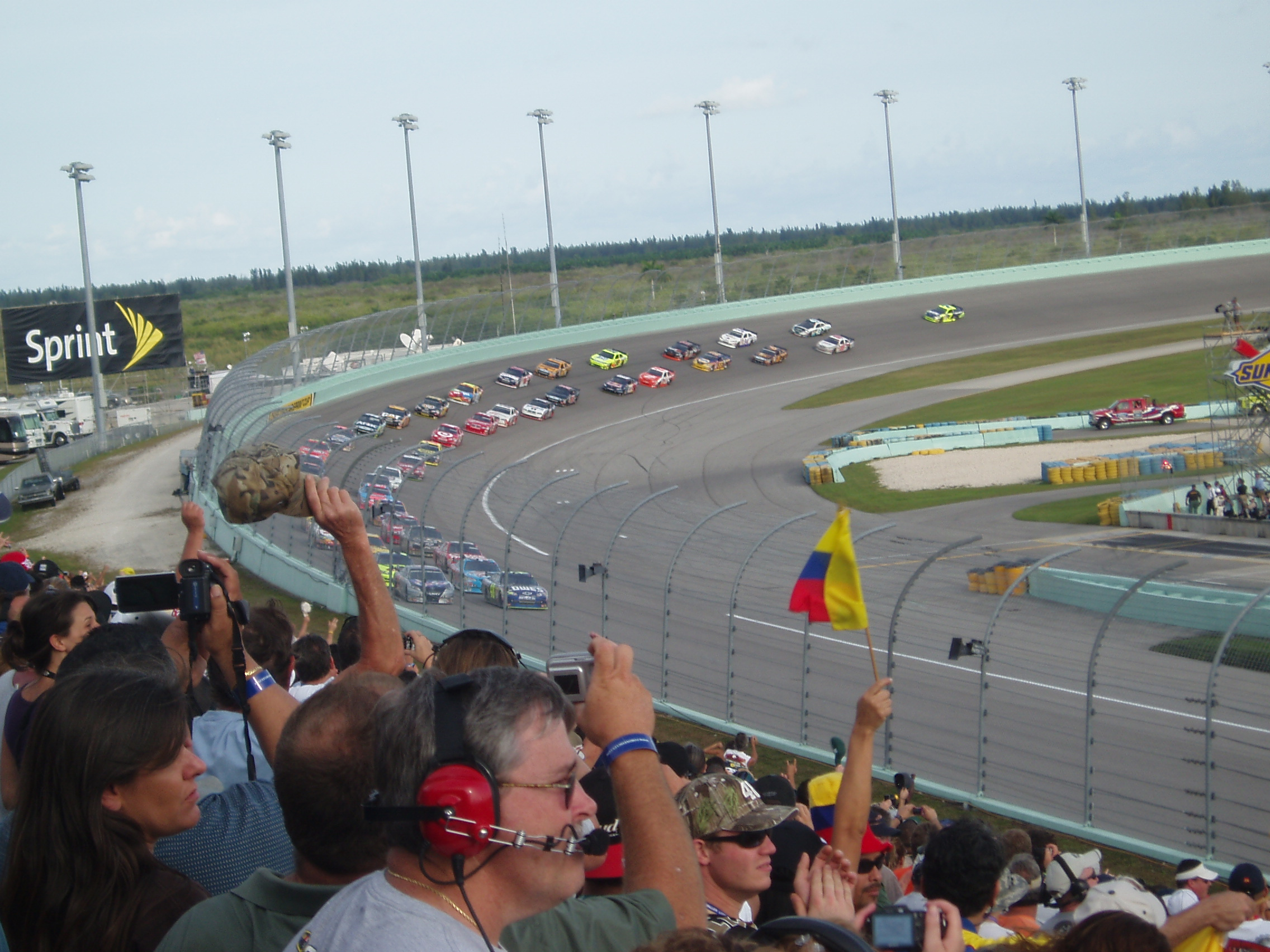
The start of the race with Jimmie Johnson leading.

The race, the last in the 2009 season, began at 3:15 pm Eastern Daylight Time and was televised live in the United States on ABC. Commentary was provided by Dale Jarrett, Andy Petree and Jerry Punch. Around the start of the race, weather conditions were partly cloudy with the air temperature 28 °C (82 °F). Fidel Gomez, assistant pastor of Calvary Chapel Fort Lauderdale in Fort Lauderdale, Florida, began pre-race ceremonies with an invocation. Actress Anika Noni Rose performed the national anthem, and actor Mike Rowe commanded the drivers to start their engines. During the pace laps, Robby Gordon had to move to the back of the grid because of him changing his engine.

Johnson retained his pole position lead into the first corner, with Speed behind him. The five points Johnson received for leading a single lap meant he now had to finish 27th or higher to win the Drivers' Championship. Two laps later, Harvick had moved into fourth position; Jamie McMurray, who began the race in eleventh, had moved up four positions to seventh place. By lap six, Ambrose began to reduce the lead of Johnson, and Martin got loose on the same lap but regained control of his car. On lap ten, Stewart passed Martin for fourth. Ambrose overtook Johnson on the outside to become the new race leader on the same lap. On lap 13, Johnson retook the lead off Ambrose. After having made three positions early, Harvick moved up into second position by passing Ambrose. On lap 16, Ambrose's car suffered a flat tire and came into the pit road.

Earnhardt who began the race in thirty-second, had moved up nineteen positions to thirteenth by lap 24. Two laps later, Ambrose began to slow and made a pit stop three laps later to change his car's battery. On lap 33, Stewart passed Johnson to become the new race leader while Ambrose entered his garage. Three laps later, Earnhardt had passed McMurray for tenth position. On lap 39, Clint Bowyer passed Martin for fourth position, as Ambrose rejoined the race four laps later. On lap 47, Kurt Busch passed Martin to claim sixth position. Three laps later, green flag pit stops began, as Matt Kenseth and Martin were the first to pit. Johnson made his pit stop one lap later.

On lap 53, Kurt Busch became the new race leader after Stewart came into his pit stall. One lap later, Kurt Busch came onto pit road and Bowyer became the new race leader. On lap 57, Harvick passed Bowyer to clinch the lead. Two laps later, Bowyer moved into second position by passing Stewart. Four laps later, Stewart reclaimed the lead after passing Harvick. On lap 64, Johnson passed Martin to move into ninth. By lap 73, Stewart had a 2.4 second lead over Harvick. One lap later, Newman collided with the wall, falling to eleventh place, and escaped with minor damage. On the 79th lap, Truex moved into seventh after passing Jeff Gordon. Two laps later, Ambrose spun at turn four but avoided contact with the barriers, causing the first caution of the race, and the pace car came out on track. During the caution, most of the leaders made pit stops.

Stewart maintained his lead on the restart on lap 86, but Harvick reclaimed the lead immediately afterward, and Stewart was passed by Bowyer for second. One lap later, Stewart dropped to sixth as he was passed by Johnson, Montoya and Kurt Busch. On lap 89, Montoya passed Kurt Busch to move into fourth position. Two laps later, Montoya moved into third position after passing Johnson. On lap 92, Montoya passed Bowyer for second, as Burton moved into third. Three laps later, Kurt Busch moved into sixth after passing Johnson. On lap 101, John Andretti collided with the wall, causing the second caution of the race. As with the first caution, most of the leaders made their pit stops.

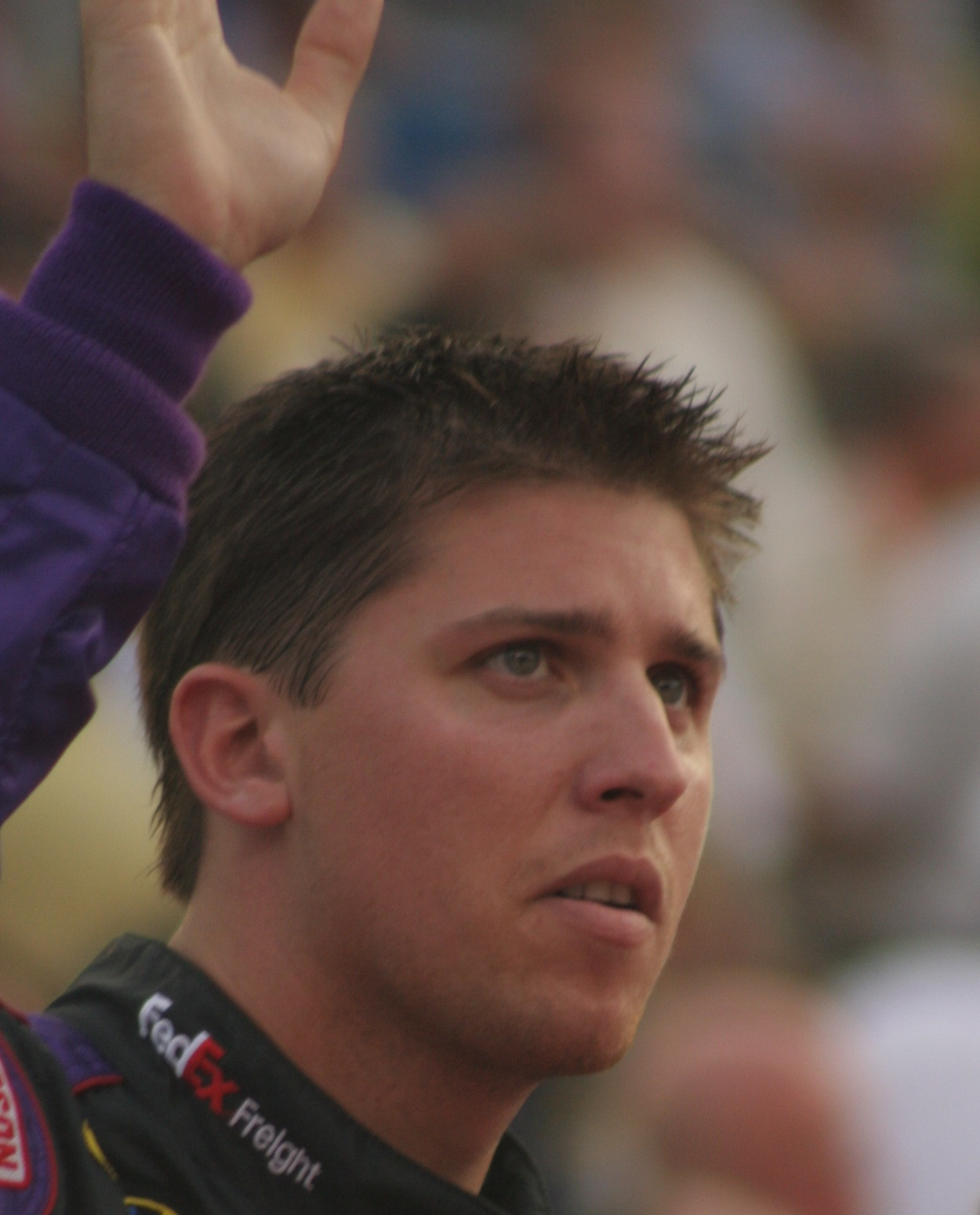
Denny Hamlin won the race after leading the most laps.

Harvick maintained his lead on the restart on the 106th lap. Three laps later, Ambrose collided with the wall which prompted the third caution. Most of the drivers stayed on track during the caution, allowing Harvick to remain the leader on the restart that happened on lap 113. A collision involving Montoya and Stewart occurred on lap 116 and the third caution was given as a result. Harvick led on the lap 124-restart, although he was passed by Kurt Busch within eleven laps. By lap 143, Kurt Busch had a 1.5 second lead over Harvick. Two laps later, Hamlin passed Harvick to claim second. On lap 156, Montoya made rear-end contact with Stewart, sending the latter into the inside retaining barrier, because he was angered by Stewart making contact with him that necessitated repairs earlier in the race. The accident prompted the fifth caution. During the caution, all of the leaders made pit stops and Montoya was black-flagged for two laps. On lap 158, Hamlin reclaimed the lead, followed by Kurt Busch and Burton.

On lap 165, Johnson moved into seventh. Afterward, Johnson passed Jeff Gordon for sixth position. Seven laps later, Kurt Busch reclaimed the lead off Hamlin. During the 184th lap, Burton passed Hamlin for second. Ten laps later, a sixth caution came out as Robby Gordon spun sideways. All leading cars made pit stops, with Hamlin maintaining his lead until Burton passed him on the restart. By lap 205, Burton had a lead of over two seconds. On lap 217, debris was spotted on the track and the seventh and final caution was prompted. The lead drivers made their pit stops. One lap later, Michael Waltrip became the new leader, followed by Andretti. Kurt Busch regained the lead one lap later, when Waltrip and Andretti made their pit stops. Kyle Busch immediately passed Kurt Busch on the restart for the lead on the 222nd lap. One lap later, Hamlin reclaimed the lead off Kyle Busch.

On lap 229, Jeff Gordon passed Johnson for the seventh position. Seven laps later, Martin moved into twelfth. After 247 laps, Hamlin's lead over Kyle Busch was 2.3 seconds. During the 249th lap, Edwards passed Bowyer for eighth. Six laps later, Kurt Busch passed Kyle Busch for third, and Kyle Busch lost fourth place to Johnson on lap 256. Hamlin maintained the lead to win his fourth race of the 2009 season, his second in the Chase for the Sprint Cup, and the eighth of his career. Burton finished second, ahead of Harvick and Kurt Busch. Johnson, who finished fifth, became the first driver to clinch four consecutive Drivers' Championships, overtaking Cale Yarborough's streak of three successive titles from 1976 to 1978. Gordon, Edwards, Kyle Busch, Truex and A. J. Allmendinger rounded out the top ten finishers. There were eighteen lead changes among ten different drivers over the course of the event. Hamlin led three times for a total of 71 laps, more than any other driver.

=== Post-race ===
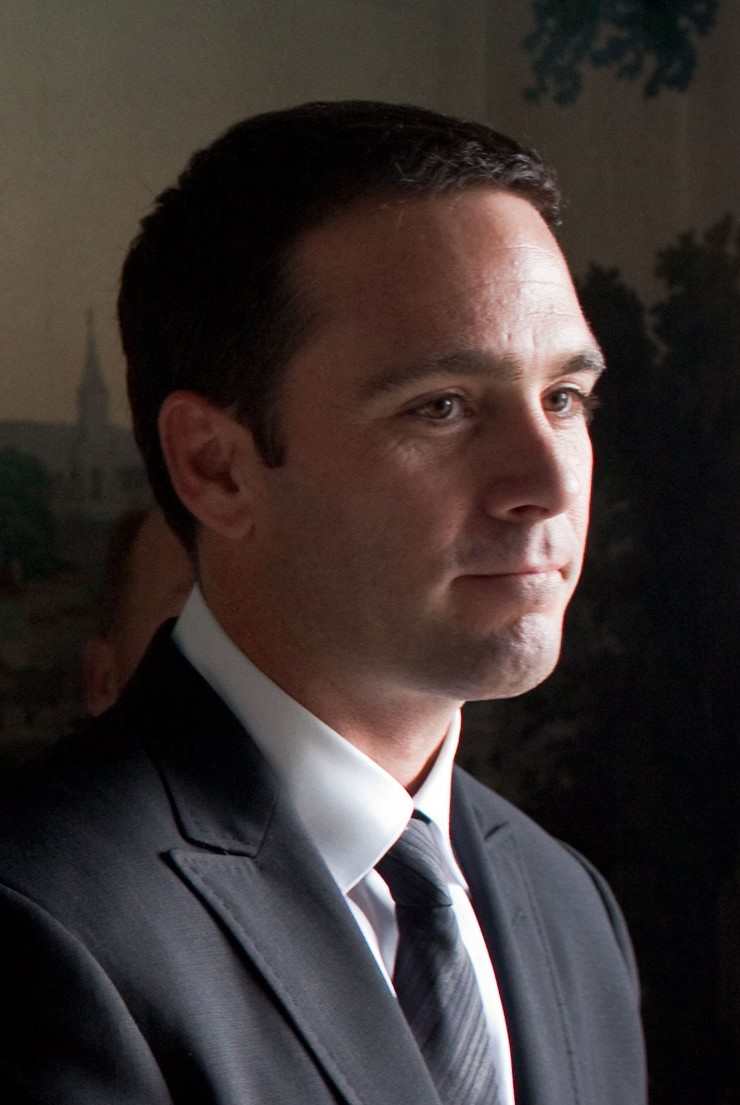
Jimmie Johnson, who qualified on pole position, won the championship after finishing fifth in the race.

"History, boys, No one ever – ever! I don't know how to thank you guys. Thank you so much."

— Jimmie Johnson, speaking on his team radio after winning the championship.

Hamlin appeared in victory lane to start celebrating his fourth win of the season in front of 70,000 who attended the race. Hamlin also earned $347,975 in race winnings. After winning the race, Hamlin described his disappointment by saying, "The car took off and it was game-over, Everyone's got a little fight in them, especially when they get done wrong. After our performance today, it's easy to put yesterday behind me."

Afterward, Johnson began celebrating his fourth consecutive Sprint Cup Series championship, and was congratulated by Martin. During the celebration, Johnson said he was delighted with his performance, "The truth of it is, to do something that's never been done in this sport – to love the sport like I do and respect it like I do – and the greats: Petty, Earnhardt, Gordon ... to do something they've never done is so awesome. To win four championships in eight years, what this team has done ... I don't know where to start. It's unbelievable." Burton, who finished second, commended Johnson's achievements saying, "It's hard to say he's the best when you're out there racing against him, but you have to put him on the list." Martin, who finished second in points, said,

"Our car didn't work well [Sunday], It didn't work well, and we really struggled with it. And as the sun went down, we went to the back. We came in and pitted and tried to do some work on it to try to improve it, and it didn't really improve it a whole lot, so then we were stuck with sorry track position on top of not having a great race car. We just fought and fought and fought, and actually the last adjustment perked it up, and we drove from 21st to 10th, and then right at the end a couple of the guys got the high line going and got me back."

Following the race, both Montoya and Stewart made no comment on their collisions. Darian Grubb, Stewart's crew chief, apologized to Montoya's crew chief Brian Pattie for the accident. Pattie said that he did not foresee the crash, adding, "It shows you that (Montoya) is not going to be pushed around. But it didn't help us, and it didn't help (Stewart)." Grubb commented, "I haven't seen all the replays and I don't know what happened first and when. They were racing each other pretty hard and both got frustrated."

In the Drivers' Championship, Johnson finished first with 6,652 points, one-hundred and forty one ahead of Martin in second. Jeff Gordon followed in third with 6,473. Kurt Busch and Hamlin rounded out the top five positions with 6,446 and 6,335 points respectively. In the Manufacturers' Championship, Chevrolet won with 262 points, fifty-five ahead of Toyota and ninety-eight ahead of Ford. Dodge finished fourth with 159 points. 5.60 million people watched the race on television. The race took three hours, six minutes and eighteen seconds to complete, and the margin of victory was 2.632 seconds.

=== Race results ===
Pos	Grid	Car	Driver	Team	Manufacturer	Laps	Pts.
1	38	11	Denny Hamlin	Joe Gibbs Racing	Toyota	267	195^{2}
2	26	31	Jeff Burton	Richard Childress Racing	Chevrolet	267	175^{1}
3	6	29	Kevin Harvick	Richard Childress Racing	Chevrolet	267	170^{1}
4	12	2	Kurt Busch	Penske Championship Racing	Dodge	267	165^{1}
5	1	48	Jimmie Johnson	Hendrick Motorsports	Chevrolet	267	160^{1}
6	20	24	Jeff Gordon	Hendrick Motorsports	Chevrolet	267	150
7	24	99	Carl Edwards	Roush Fenway Racing	Ford	267	146
8	30	18	Kyle Busch	Joe Gibbs Racing	Toyota	267	147^{1}
9	14	1	Martin Truex Jr.	Earnhardt Ganassi Racing	Chevrolet	267	138
10	13	44	A. J. Allmendinger	Richard Petty Motorsports	Ford	267	134
11	10	33	Clint Bowyer	Richard Childress Racing	Chevrolet	267	135^{1}
12	4	5	Mark Martin	Hendrick Motorsports	Chevrolet	267	127
13	34	17	Matt Kenseth	Roush Fenway Racing	Ford	267	124
14	8	16	Greg Biffle	Roush Fenway Racing	Ford	267	121
15	22	00	David Reutimann	Michael Waltrip Racing	Toyota	267	118
16	9	21	Bill Elliott	Richard Petty Motorsports	Ford	267	115
17	25	9	Kasey Kahne	Richard Petty Motorsports	Ford	267	112
18	11	26	Jamie McMurray	Roush Fenway Racing	Ford	267	109
19	15	07	Casey Mears	Richard Childress Racing	Chevrolet	267	106
20	33	83	Brian Vickers	Red Bull Racing Team	Toyota	267	103
21	29	77	Sam Hornish Jr.	Penske Championship Racing	Dodge	267	100
22	5	14	Tony Stewart	Stewart–Haas Racing	Chevrolet	267	102^{1}
23	7	39	Ryan Newman	Stewart–Haas Racing	Chevrolet	267	94
24	35	20	Joey Logano	Joe Gibbs Racing	Toyota	267	91
25	27	12	Brad Keselowski	Penske Championship Racing	Dodge	267	88
26	36	98	Paul Menard	Robert Yates Racing	Ford	267	85
27	2	82	Scott Speed	Red Bull Racing Team	Toyota	267	82
28	32	88	Dale Earnhardt Jr.	Hendrick Motorsports	Chevrolet	267	79
29	17	02	David Gilliland	Joe Gibbs Racing	Toyota	267	76
30	39	55	Michael Waltrip	Michael Waltrip Racing	Toyota	266	78^{1}
31	19	71	Bobby Labonte	TRG Motorsports	Chevrolet	266	70
32	16	78	Regan Smith	Furniture Row Racing	Chevrolet	266	67
33	40	34	John Andretti	Front Row Motorsports	Chevrolet	266	64
34	41	6	David Ragan	Roush Fenway Racing	Ford	266	61
35	3	47	Marcos Ambrose	JTG Daugherty Racing	Toyota	251	63^{1}
36	31	96	Erik Darnell	Hall of Fame Racing	Ford	247	55
37	28	37	Travis Kvapil	Front Row Motorsports	Chevrolet	243	52
38	23	42	Juan Pablo Montoya	Earnhardt Ganassi Racing	Chevrolet	235	49
39	37	7	Robby Gordon	Robby Gordon Motorsports	Toyota	227	46
40	42	43	Reed Sorenson	Richard Petty Motorsports	Dodge	116	43
41	21	19	Elliott Sadler	Richard Petty Motorsports	Dodge	116	40
42	43	08	Terry Labonte	Carter Simo Racing	Toyota	88	37
43	18	36	Michael McDowell	Tommy Baldwin Racing	Toyota	35	34
^{1} Includes five bonus points for leading a lap
^{2} Includes ten bonus points for leading the most laps

== Standings after the race ==
Drivers' Championship standings
Pos	+/–	Driver	Points
1		Jimmie Johnson	6,652
2		Mark Martin	6,511 (−141)
3		Jeff Gordon	6,473 (−179)
4		Kurt Busch	6,446 (−206)
5	3	Denny Hamlin	6,335 (−317)
6	1	Tony Stewart	6,309 (−343)
7		Greg Biffle	6,292 (−360)
8	2	Juan Pablo Montoya	6,252 (−400)
9		Ryan Newman	6,175 (−477)
10		Kasey Kahne	6,128 (−524)
11		Carl Edwards	6,118 (−534)
12		Brian Vickers	5,929 (−723)

Manufacturers' Championship standings
Pos	+/–	Manufacturer	Points
1		Chevrolet	262
2		Toyota	207 (−55)
3		Ford	164 (−98)
4		Dodge	159 (−103)

- Note: Only the top twelve positions are included for the driver standings. These drivers qualified for the Chase for the Sprint Cup.

Previous race: 2009 Checker O'Reilly Auto Parts 500	Sprint Cup Series; 2009 season	Next race: 2010 Daytona 500
