= 2011 Kobalt Tools 500 =

Race details
- Race 35 of 36 in the 2011 NASCAR Sprint Cup Series
- Date: November 13, 2011
- Location: Phoenix International Raceway in Avondale, Arizona
- Course: Permanent racing facility
- Course length: 1 miles (1.6 km)
- Distance: 312 laps, 312 mi (502.115 km)
- Weather: Rain showers with a high temperature around 62.
- Average speed: 112.909 miles per hour (181.709 km/h)

Pole position
Driver	Matt Kenseth	Roush Fenway Racing
- Time: 26.258

Most laps led
Driver	Tony Stewart	Stewart Haas Racing
- Laps: 160

Winner
No. 4	Kasey Kahne	Red Bull Racing Team

Television in the United States
- Network: ESPN
- Announcers: Allen Bestwick, Dale Jarrett, and Andy Petree

The 2011 Kobalt Tools 500 was a NASCAR Sprint Cup Series stock car race held on November 13, 2011 at Phoenix International Raceway in Avondale, Arizona. Contested over 312 laps, it was the thirty-fifth as well as the ninth race in the Chase for the Sprint Cup during the 2011 NASCAR Sprint Cup Series season. The race was won by Kasey Kahne for the Red Bull Racing Team. Carl Edwards finished second, and Tony Stewart clinched third.

== Report ==
=== Background ===
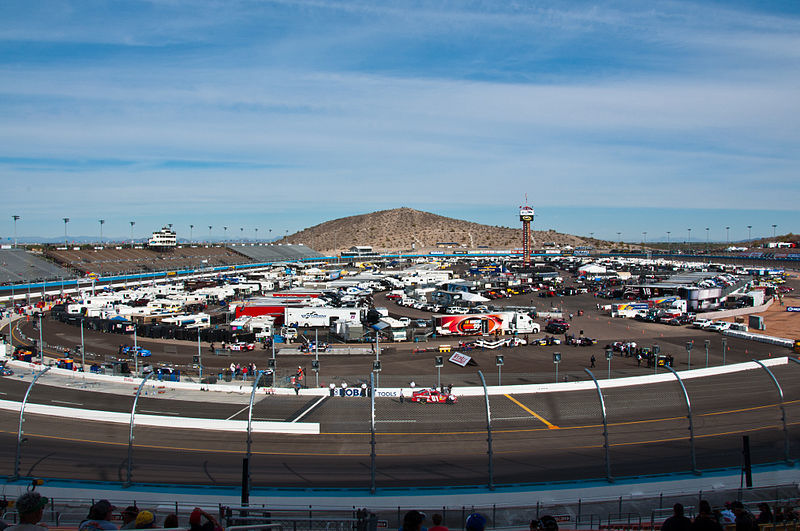
Phoenix International Raceway, where the race was held.

Phoenix International Raceway is one of five short tracks to hold NASCAR races; the others are Richmond International Raceway, Dover International Speedway, Bristol Motor Speedway, and Martinsville Speedway. The standard track at Phoenix International Raceway is a four-turn short track oval that is 1 mile (1.6 km) long. After the February race, PIR was significantly reconfigured. The first two turns are now banked from 10 to 11 degrees, while the final two turns are banked from 8 to 9 degrees. The front stretch, the location of the finish line, is banked at three degrees. The back stretch, nicknamed the 'dogleg', varies from 10 to 11 degree banking. The racetrack has seats for 76,800 spectators.

Before the race, Carl Edwards led the Drivers' Championship with 2,316 points, and Tony Stewart stood in second with 2,313 points. Kevin Harvick followed in third with 2,283 points, five ahead of Matt Kenseth and 16 ahead of Brad Keselowski in fourth and fifth. Jimmie Johnson, with 2,261 was 24 points ahead of Dale Earnhardt Jr., as Jeff Gordon with 2,235 points, was six ahead of Kurt Busch, and 18 in front of Denny Hamlin. Kyle Busch and Ryan Newman was eleventh and twelfth with 2,216 and 2,213 points. In the Manufacturers' Championship, Chevrolet was leading with 235 points, 52 ahead of Ford. Toyota, with 174 points, was 18 points ahead of Dodge in the battle for third. Edwards is the race's defending champion, after winning the race in 2010.

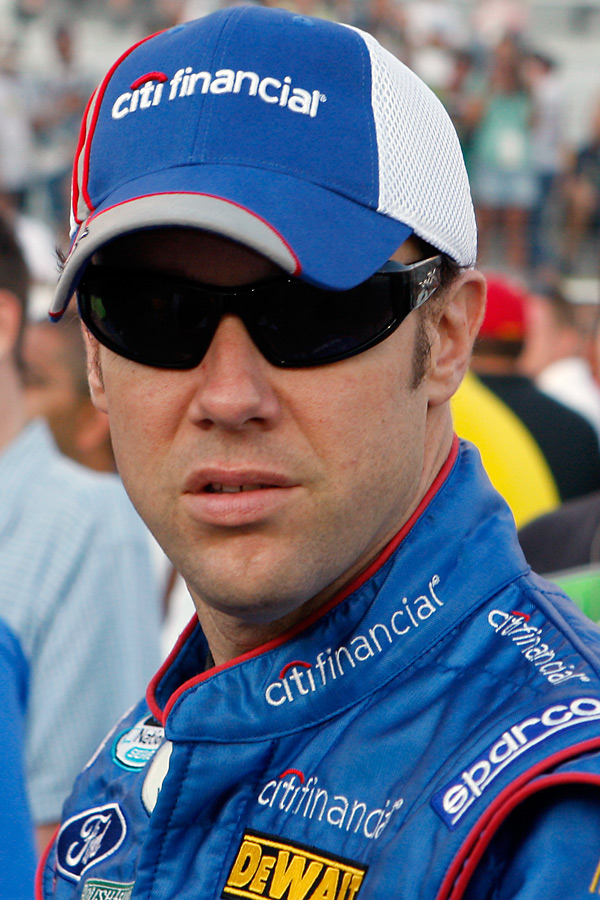
Matt Kenseth earned his third pole position of the season with a time of 26.258 seconds

=== Practice and qualifying ===
Two 120 minute practice sessions were held before the race on Friday. Jeff Burton was quickest with a time of 25.702 seconds in the first session, more than two-hundredths of a second faster than Kenseth. David Ragan was just off Kenseth's pace, followed by Paul Menard, Newman, and David Reutimann. A. J. Allmendinger was seventh, still within a second of Burton's time. Also in the session, Kyle Busch's team changed his car's engine after engine problems. In the second practice session, Menard was fastest with a time of 25.510 seconds, seven-hundredths of a second quicker than second-placed Edwards. Regan Smith took third place, ahead of Brian Vickers, Kyle Busch and Jamie McMurray. Stewart could only manage 36th place.

Afterward, during qualifying, forty-six cars were entered, but only forty-three were able to race because of NASCAR's qualifying procedure. Kenseth clinched his third pole position during the season, with a time of 26.258 seconds. He was joined on the front row of the grid by Allmendinger. Marcos Ambrose qualified third, Mark Martin took fourth, and Martin Truex Jr. started fifth. Stewart, one of the drivers in the Chase for the Sprint Cup, qualified eighth, while Edwards was scored ninth. The three drivers that failed to qualify for the race were Scott Riggs, David Stremme, and Andy Lally. Once the qualifying session completed, Kenseth commented, "Jimmy Fennig, had a strategy to go fast in the first practice to go out late. Even though we knew the temperature would be hotter he thought the track could be faster with more cars having run on it. A lot of people chose the opposite strategy and worked on race set-up in the first practice and did their qualifying stuff in the second practice to go out early."

== Results ==
=== Qualifying ===
Grid	Car	Driver	Team	Manufacturer	Time	Speed
1	17	Matt Kenseth	Roush Fenway Racing	Ford	26.258	137.101
2	43	A. J. Allmendinger	Richard Petty Motorsports	Ford	26.384	136.446
3	9	Marcos Ambrose	Richard Petty Motorsports	Ford	26.411	136.307
4	5	Mark Martin	Hendrick Motorsports	Chevrolet	26.455	136.080
5	56	Martin Truex Jr.	Michael Waltrip Racing	Toyota	26.455	136.080
6	1	Jamie McMurray	Earnhardt Ganassi Racing	Chevrolet	26.469	136.008
7	00	David Reutimann	Michael Waltrip Racing	Toyota	26.473	135.988
8	14	Tony Stewart	Stewart–Haas Racing	Chevrolet	26.488	135.911
9	99	Carl Edwards	Roush Fenway Racing	Ford	26.529	135.701
10	4	Kasey Kahne	Red Bull Racing Team	Toyota	26.534	135.675
11	27	Paul Menard	Richard Childress Racing	Chevrolet	26.547	135.609
12	2	Brad Keselowski	Penske Racing	Dodge	26.585	135.415
13	6	David Ragan	Roush Fenway Racing	Ford	26.588	135.399
14	31	Jeff Burton	Richard Childress Racing	Chevrolet	26.608	135.298
15	78	Regan Smith	Furniture Row Racing	Chevrolet	26.613	135.272
16	48	Jimmie Johnson	Hendrick Motorsports	Chevrolet	26.618	135.247
17	22	Kurt Busch	Penske Racing	Dodge	26.622	135.227
18	83	Brian Vickers	Red Bull Racing Team	Toyota	26.624	135.216
19	84	Cole Whitt	Red Bull Racing Team	Toyota	26.625	135.211
20	7	Robby Gordon	Robby Gordon Motorsports	Dodge	26.630	135.186
21	51	Landon Cassill	Phoenix Racing	Chevrolet	26.631	135.181
22	88	Dale Earnhardt Jr.	Hendrick Motorsports	Chevrolet	26.634	135.166
23	24	Jeff Gordon	Hendrick Motorsports	Chevrolet	26.689	134.887
24	46	Scott Speed	Whitney Motorsports	Ford	26.694	134.862
25	20	Joey Logano	Joe Gibbs Racing	Toyota	26.696	134.852
26	42	Juan Pablo Montoya	Earnhardt Ganassi Racing	Chevrolet	26.704	134.811
27	29	Kevin Harvick	Richard Childress Racing	Chevrolet	26.715	134.756
28	33	Clint Bowyer	Richard Childress Racing	Chevrolet	26.751	134.574
29	16	Greg Biffle	Roush Fenway Racing	Ford	26.756	134.549
30	39	Ryan Newman	Stewart–Haas Racing	Chevrolet	26.764	134.509
31	47	Bobby Labonte	JTG Daugherty Racing	Toyota	26.793	134.363
32	87	Joe Nemechek	NEMCO Motorsports	Toyota	26.837	134.143
33	11	Denny Hamlin	Joe Gibbs Racing	Toyota	26.850	134.078
34	18	Kyle Busch	Joe Gibbs Racing	Toyota	26.936	133.650
35	66	Michael McDowell	HP Racing	Toyota	26.979	133.437
36	37	Mike Skinner	Max Q Motorsports	Ford	27.023	133.220
37	55	Travis Kvapil	Front Row Motorsports	Ford	27.040	133.136
38	13	Casey Mears	Germain Racing	Toyota	27.062	133.028
39	32	Mike Bliss	FAS Lane Racing	Ford	27.184	132.431
40	36	Geoffrey Bodine	Tommy Baldwin Racing	Chevrolet	27.417	131.305
41	38	J. J. Yeley	Front Row Motorsports	Ford	27.911	128.981
42	34	David Gilliland	Front Row Motorsports	Ford	29.252	123.068
43	35	Dave Blaney	Tommy Baldwin Racing	Chevrolet	27.157	132.562
Failed to qualify
44	23	Scott Riggs	R3 Motorsports	Toyota	27.336	131.695
45	30	David Stremme	Inception Motorsports	Chevrolet	27.355	131.603
46	71	Andy Lally	TRG Motorsports	Ford	28.215	127.592

=== Race results ===
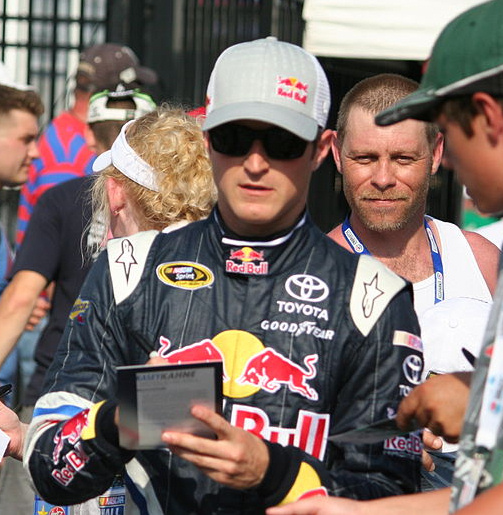
Kasey Kahne won the race.

Pos	Car	Driver	Team	Manufacturer	Laps	Points
1	4	Kasey Kahne	Red Bull Racing Team	Toyota	312	47
2	99	Carl Edwards	Roush Fenway Racing	Ford	312	43
3	14	Tony Stewart	Stewart–Haas Racing	Chevrolet	312	43
4	31	Jeff Burton	Richard Childress Racing	Chevrolet	312	40
5	39	Ryan Newman	Stewart–Haas Racing	Chevrolet	312	39
6	43	A. J. Allmendinger	Richard Petty Motorsports	Ford	312	38
7	00	David Reutimann	Michael Waltrip Racing	Toyota	312	37
8	9	Marcos Ambrose	Richard Petty Motorsports	Ford	312	36
9	27	Paul Menard	Richard Childress Racing	Chevrolet	312	35
10	33	Clint Bowyer	Richard Childress Racing	Chevrolet	312	34
11	20	Joey Logano	Joe Gibbs Racing	Toyota	312	33
12	11	Denny Hamlin	Joe Gibbs Racing	Toyota	312	32
13	16	Greg Biffle	Roush Fenway Racing	Ford	311	31
14	48	Jimmie Johnson	Hendrick Motorsports	Chevrolet	311	30
15	42	Juan Pablo Montoya	Earnhardt Ganassi Racing	Chevrolet	311	29
16	5	Mark Martin	Hendrick Motorsports	Chevrolet	311	28
17	1	Jamie McMurray	Earnhardt Ganassi Racing	Chevrolet	311	27
18	2	Brad Keselowski	Penske Racing	Dodge	311	27
19	29	Kevin Harvick	Richard Childress Racing	Chevrolet	311	25
20	56	Martin Truex Jr.	Michael Waltrip Racing	Toyota	311	24
21	47	Bobby Labonte	JTG Daugherty Racing	Toyota	311	23
22	22	Kurt Busch	Penske Racing	Dodge	311	23
23	83	Brian Vickers	Red Bull Racing Team	Toyota	311	21
24	88	Dale Earnhardt Jr.	Hendrick Motorsports	Chevrolet	310	20
25	84	Cole Whitt	Red Bull Racing Team	Toyota	310	0
26	13	Casey Mears	Germain Racing	Toyota	309	18
27	35	Dave Blaney	Tommy Baldwin Racing	Chevrolet	309	17
28	38	J. J. Yeley	Front Row Motorsports	Ford	309	17
29	51	Landon Cassill	Phoenix Racing	Chevrolet	309	0
30	32	Mike Bliss	FAS Lane Racing	Ford	308	0
31	34	David Gilliland	Front Row Motorsports	Ford	307	13
32	24	Jeff Gordon	Hendrick Motorsports	Chevrolet	306	12
33	6	David Ragan	Roush Fenway Racing	Ford	298	11
34	17	Matt Kenseth	Roush Fenway Racing	Ford	238	11
35	7	Robby Gordon	Robby Gordon Motorsports	Dodge	218	9
36	18	Kyle Busch	Joe Gibbs Racing	Toyota	188	8
37	36	Geoffrey Bodine	Tommy Baldwin Racing	Chevrolet	153	7
38	78	Regan Smith	Furniture Row Racing	Chevrolet	62	6
39	46	Scott Speed	Whitney Motorsports	Ford	60	0
40	66	Michael McDowell	HP Racing	Toyota	46	4
41	87	Joe Nemechek	NEMCO Motorsports	Toyota	30	0
42	37	Mike Skinner	Max Q Motorsports	Ford	25	0
43	55	Travis Kvapil	Front Row Motorsports	Ford	20	0

== Standings after the race ==
Drivers' Championship standings
	Pos	Driver	Points
	1	Carl Edwards	2,359
	2	Tony Stewart	2,356 (−3)
	3	Kevin Harvick	2,308 (−51)
1	4	Brad Keselowski	2,294 (−65)
1	5	Jimmie Johnson	2,291 (−68)

Manufacturers' Championship standings
Pos	Manufacturer	Points
1	Chevrolet	239
2	Ford	189 (−50)
3	Toyota	183 (−56)
4	Dodge	159 (−80)

- Note: Only the top five positions are included for the driver standings.

Previous race: 2011 AAA Texas 500	Sprint Cup Series; 2011 season	Next race: 2011 Ford 400
