= 2011 AAA Texas 500 =

Race details
- Race 34 of 36 in the 2011 NASCAR Sprint Cup Series
- 2011 AAA Texas 500 program cover
- Date: November 6, 2011
- Location: Texas Motor Speedway in Fort Worth, Texas
- Course: Permanent racing facility
- Course length: 1.5 miles (2.4 km)
- Distance: 334 laps, 501 mi (806.3 km)
- Weather: Sunny with a high around 71; wind out of the SE at 11 mph.
- Average speed: 152.705 miles per hour (245.755 km/h)

Pole position
Driver	Greg Biffle	Roush Fenway Racing
- Time: 27.873

Most laps led
Driver	Tony Stewart	Stewart–Haas Racing
- Laps: 173

Winner
No. 14	Tony Stewart	Stewart–Haas Racing

Television in the United States
- Network: ESPN
- Announcers: Allen Bestwick, Dale Jarrett and Andy Petree

The layout of Texas Motor Speedway, the venue where the race was held.

The 2011 AAA Texas 500 was a NASCAR Sprint Cup Series event held on November 6, 2011, at Texas Motor Speedway in Fort Worth, Texas. Contested over 334 laps, the event was the eighth race in the Chase for the Sprint Cup during the 2011 NASCAR Sprint Cup Series season. Tony Stewart led 173 of the 334 laps and won the race while Carl Edwards and Kasey Kahne finished second and third respectively. The race featured five cautions and twenty-three lead changes, while Stewart's win was his fourth of the season and second in a row after winning the previous week's race as well. Before the race, Kyle Busch was suspended by NASCAR due to his actions in the 2011 WinStar World Casino 350K. He was replaced by Michael McDowell.

The race was filmed for footage for the British motor show Top Gear, where presenter Richard Hammond was shown walking around the Texas Motor Speedway campgrounds, being the honorary pace car driver, and being a pit crew member for Mark Martin's team. Afterwards, Hammond would get a ride with Kyle Petty for the Petty Racing Experience.

== Entry list ==
No.	Driver	Team	Make
00	David Reutimann	Michael Waltrip Racing	Toyota
1	Jamie McMurray	Earnhardt Ganassi Racing	Chevrolet
2	Brad Keselowski	Penske Racing	Ford
4	Kasey Kahne	Red Bull Racing Team	Toyota
5	Mark Martin	Hendrick Motorsports	Chevrolet
6	David Ragan	Roush Fenway Racing	Ford
7	Reed Sorenson	Robby Gordon Motorsports	Dodge
9	Marcos Ambrose	Richard Petty Motorsports	Ford
11	Denny Hamlin	Joe Gibbs Racing	Toyota
13	Casey Mears	Germain Racing	Toyota
14	Tony Stewart	Stewart–Haas Racing	Chevrolet
16	Greg Biffle	Roush Fenway Racing	Ford
17	Matt Kenseth	Roush Fenway Racing	Ford
18	Kyle Busch	Joe Gibbs Racing	Toyota
20	Joey Logano	Joe Gibbs Racing	Toyota
21	Trevor Bayne	Wood Brothers Racing	Ford
22	Kurt Busch	Penske Racing	Dodge
24	Jeff Gordon	Hendrick Motorsports	Chevrolet
27	Paul Menard	Richard Childress Racing	Chevrolet
29	Kevin Harvick	Richard Childress Racing	Chevrolet
30	David Stremme	Inception Motorsports	Toyota
31	Jeff Burton	Richard Childress Racing	Chevrolet
32	Mike Bliss	FAS Lane Racing	Ford
33	Clint Bowyer	Richard Childress Racing	Chevrolet
34	David Gilliland	Front Row Motorsports	Ford
35	Dave Blaney	Tommy Baldwin Racing	Chevrolet
36	Geoff Bodine	Tommy Baldwin Racing	Chevrolet
37	Mike Skinner	Max Q Motorsports	Ford
38	Travis Kvapil	Front Row Motorsports	Ford
39	Ryan Newman	Stewart–Haas Racing	Chevrolet
42	Juan Pablo Montoya	Earnhardt Ganassi Racing	Chevrolet
43	A.J. Allmendinger	Richard Petty Motorsports	Ford
46	Scott Speed	Whitney Motorsports	Ford
47	Bobby Labonte	JTG Daugherty Racing	Toyota
48	Jimmie Johnson	Hendrick Motorsports	Chevrolet
51	Landon Cassill	Phoenix Racing	Chevrolet
55	J.J. Yeley	Front Row Motorsports	Ford
56	Martin Truex Jr.	Michael Waltrip Racing	Toyota
66	Michael McDowell	HP Racing	Toyota
71	Andy Lally	TRG Motorsports	Ford
77	T.J. Bell	TRG Motorsports	Ford
77	Robby Gordon	Robby Gordon Motorsports	Dodge
78	Regan Smith	Furniture Row Racing	Chevrolet
83	Brian Vickers	Red Bull Racing Team	Toyota
87	Joe Nemechek	NEMCO Motorsports	Chevrolet
88	Dale Earnhardt Jr.	Hendrick Motorsports	Chevrolet
95	David Starr	Leavine Family Racing	Ford
99	Carl Edwards	Roush Fenway Racing	Ford

== Qualifying ==
Pos.	No.	Driver	Make	Team	Time	Avg. Speed (mph)
1	16	Greg Biffle	Ford	Roush Fenway Racing	27.873	193.736
2	6	David Ragan	Ford	Roush Fenway Racing	27.874	193.729
3	17	Matt Kenseth	Ford	Roush Fenway Racing	27.884	193.659
4	27	Paul Menard	Chevrolet	Richard Childress Racing	27.916	193.437
5	14	Tony Stewart	Chevrolet	Stewart–Haas Racing	27.942	193.257
6	00	David Reutimann	Toyota	Michael Waltrip Racing	27.953	193.181
7	99	Carl Edwards	Ford	Roush Fenway Racing	27.969	193.071
8	2	Brad Keselowski	Dodge	Penske Racing	27.976	193.023
9	4	Kasey Kahne	Toyota	Red Bull Racing Team	27.987	192.947
10	78	Regan Smith	Chevrolet	Furniture Row Racing	27.995	192.892
11	48	Jimmie Johnson	Chevrolet	Hendrick Motorsports	27.998	192.871
12	9	Marcos Ambrose	Ford	Richard Petty Motorsports	28.006	192.816
13	21	Trevor Bayne*	Ford	Wood Brothers Racing	28.039	192.589
14	22	Kurt Busch	Dodge	Penske Racing	28.056	192.472
15	42	Juan Pablo Montoya	Chevrolet	Earnhardt Ganassi Racing	28.072	192.362
16	88	Dale Earnhardt Jr.	Chevrolet	Hendrick Motorsports	28.106	192.130
17	18	Kyle Busch (Note: Busch qualified the car, but was suspended by NASCAR following the NASCAR Craftsman Truck Series race two days prior as a result of wrecking Ron Hornaday Jr. under the caution. He would be substituted by Michael McDowell as a result.)	Toyota	Joe Gibbs Racing	28.107	192.123
18	33	Clint Bowyer	Chevrolet	Richard Childress Racing	28.107	192.123
19	56	Martin Truex Jr.	Toyota	Michael Waltrip Racing	28.127	191.986
20	83	Brian Vickers	Toyota	Red Bull Racing Team	28.137	191.918
21	29	Kevin Harvick	Chevrolet	Richard Childress Racing	28.177	191.646
22	1	Jamie McMurray	Chevrolet	Earnhardt Ganassi Racing	28.188	191.571
23	24	Jeff Gordon	Chevrolet	Hendrick Motorsports	28.189	191.564
24	39	Ryan Newman	Chevrolet	Stewart–Haas Racing	28.210	191.421
25	20	Joey Logano	Toyota	Joe Gibbs Racing	28.228	191.299
26	43	A.J. Allmendinger	Ford	Richard Petty Motorsports	28.235	191.252
27	55	J.J. Yeley*	Ford	Front Row Motorsports	28.262	191.069
28	11	Denny Hamlin	Toyota	Joe Gibbs Racing	28.273	190.995
29	51	Landon Cassill	Chevrolet	Phoenix Racing	28.326	190.638
30	5	Mark Martin	Chevrolet	Hendrick Motorsports	28.356	190.436
31	31	Jeff Burton	Chevrolet	Richard Childress Racing	28.363	190.389
32	47	Bobby Labonte	Toyota	JTG Daugherty Racing	28.388	190.221
33	13	Casey Mears	Toyota	Germain Racing	28.388	190.221
34	34	David Gilliland	Ford	Front Row Motorsports	28.418	190.020
35	66	Michael McDowell*	Toyota	HP Racing	28.460	189.740
36	35	Dave Blaney*	Chevrolet	Tommy Baldwin Racing	28.475	189.640
37	32	Mike Bliss	Ford	FAS Lane Racing	28.586	188.904
38	37	Mike Skinner*	Ford	Max Q Motorsports	28.586	188.904
39	46	Scott Speed*	Ford	Whitney Motorsports	28.620	188.679
40	87	Joe Nemechek*	Toyota	NEMCO Motorsports	28.632	188.600
41	38	Travis Kvapil**	Ford	Front Row Motorsports	28.711	188.081
42	36	Geoffrey Bodine**	Chevrolet	Tommy Baldwin Racing	29.646	182.149
43	71	Andy Lally*	Ford	TRG Motorsports	28.643	188.528
Failed to qualify or withdrew
44	30	David Stremme	Chevrolet	Inception Motorsports	28.669	188.357
45	95	David Starr	Ford	Leavine Family Racing	28.671	188.344
46	7	Reed Sorenson	Dodge	Robby Gordon Motorsports	28.849	187.182
WD	77	T.J. Bell	Ford	TRG Motorsports	0.000	0.000
WD	77	Robby Gordon	Dodge	Robby Gordon Motorsports	0.000	0.000

*Qualified by time.

**Qualified by being Top 35 in Owner's Points.

== Race recap ==
=== Pre-race ===
For pre-race ceremonies, Dr. Roger Marsh from Texas Alliance Raceway Ministries gave the invocation. Showdog Recording artist Trace Adkins would sing the national anthem, with a singular B-52 Bomber from the Barksdale Air Force Base performing the flyover. The president of Texas' AAA branch at the time, Bob Bouttier, gave the command to start engines.

Honorary pace car driver, former Top Gear host and now host of The Grand Tour, Richard Hammond would lead the field to green.

== Race results ==
Finish	No.	Driver	Make	Team	Laps	Led	Status	Pts	Winnings
1	14	Tony Stewart	Chevrolet	Stewart–Haas Racing	334	173	running	48	$484,783
2	99	Carl Edwards	Ford	Roush Fenway Racing	334	14	running	43	$361,566
3	4	Kasey Kahne	Toyota	Red Bull Racing Team	334	5	running	42	$231,883
4	17	Matt Kenseth	Ford	Roush Fenway Racing	334	87	running	41	$227,461
5	16	Greg Biffle	Ford	Roush Fenway Racing	334	23	running	40	$196,125
6	24	Jeff Gordon	Chevrolet	Hendrick Motorsports	334	0	running	38	$190,661
7	88	Dale Earnhardt Jr.	Chevrolet	Hendrick Motorsports	334	0	running	37	$144,475
8	56	Martin Truex Jr.	Toyota	Michael Waltrip Racing	334	0	running	36	$134,325
9	33	Clint Bowyer	Chevrolet	Richard Childress Racing	334	0	running	35	$164,433
10	43	A.J. Allmendinger	Ford	Richard Petty Motorsports	334	0	running	34	$157,736
11	9	Marcos Ambrose	Ford	Richard Petty Motorsports	334	0	running	33	$140,366
12	6	David Ragan	Ford	Roush Fenway Racing	334	0	running	32	$116,625
13	29	Kevin Harvick	Chevrolet	Richard Childress Racing	334	0	running	31	$150,511
14	48	Jimmie Johnson	Chevrolet	Hendrick Motorsports	334	1	running	31	$151,011
15	27	Paul Menard	Chevrolet	Richard Childress Racing	334	1	running	30	$108,200
16	39	Ryan Newman	Chevrolet	Stewart–Haas Racing	334	4	running	29	$140,100
17	21	Trevor Bayne	Ford	Wood Brothers Racing	334	0	running	0	$98,550
18	42	Juan Pablo Montoya	Chevrolet	Earnhardt Ganassi Racing	334	0	running	26	$135,533
19	5	Mark Martin	Chevrolet	Hendrick Motorsports	334	0	running	25	$105,725
20	11	Denny Hamlin	Toyota	Joe Gibbs Racing	333	0	running	24	$143,075
21	83	Brian Vickers	Toyota	Red Bull Racing Team	333	0	running	23	$124,364
22	00	David Reutimann	Toyota	Michael Waltrip Racing	333	0	running	22	$124,683
23	78	Regan Smith	Chevrolet	Furniture Row Racing	333	0	running	21	$122,820
24	2	Brad Keselowski	Dodge	Penske Racing	333	2	running	21	$121,633
25	13	Casey Mears	Toyota	Germain Racing	333	0	running	19	$96,400
26	51	Landon Cassill	Chevrolet	Phoenix Racing	332	0	running	0	$110,083
27	31	Jeff Burton	Chevrolet	Richard Childress Racing	332	24	running	18	$104,375
28	47	Bobby Labonte	Toyota	JTG Daugherty Racing	332	0	running	16	$121,020
29	71	Andy Lally	Ford	TRG Motorsports	332	0	running	15	$101,475
30	22	Kurt Busch	Dodge	Penske Racing	331	0	running	14	$137,340
31	38	Travis Kvapil	Ford	Front Row Motorsports	331	0	running	0	$103,708
32	34	David Gilliland	Ford	Front Row Motorsports	331	0	running	12	$100,872
33	18	Michael McDowell	Toyota	Joe Gibbs Racing	331	0	running	11	$139,916
34	32	Mike Bliss	Ford	FAS Lane Racing	329	0	running	0	$90,925
35	35	Dave Blaney	Chevrolet	Tommy Baldwin Racing	316	0	running	9	$90,725
36	1	Jamie McMurray	Chevrolet	Earnhardt Ganassi Racing	295	0	running	8	$129,114
37	20	Joey Logano	Toyota	Joe Gibbs Racing	258	0	engine	7	$93.800
38	36	Geoffrey Bodine	Chevrolet	Tommy Baldwin Racing	215	0	vibration	6	$90,100
39	46	Scott Speed	Ford	Whitney Motorsports	30	0	rear-gear	0	$89,900
40	66	Josh Wise	Toyota	HP Racing	23	0	rear-gear	0	$89,700
41	37	Mike Skinner	Ford	Max Q Motorsports	19	0	brakes	0	$89,475
42	87	Joe Nemechek	Toyota	NEMCO Motorsports	14	0	clutch	0	$89,275
43	55	J.J. Yeley	Ford	Front Row Motorsports	10	0	fuel-pressure	1	$89,561

Previous race: 2011 Tums Fast Relief 500	Sprint Cup Series; 2011 season	Next race: 2011 Kobalt Tools 500
