= Greg Mabin =

American football player (born 1994)

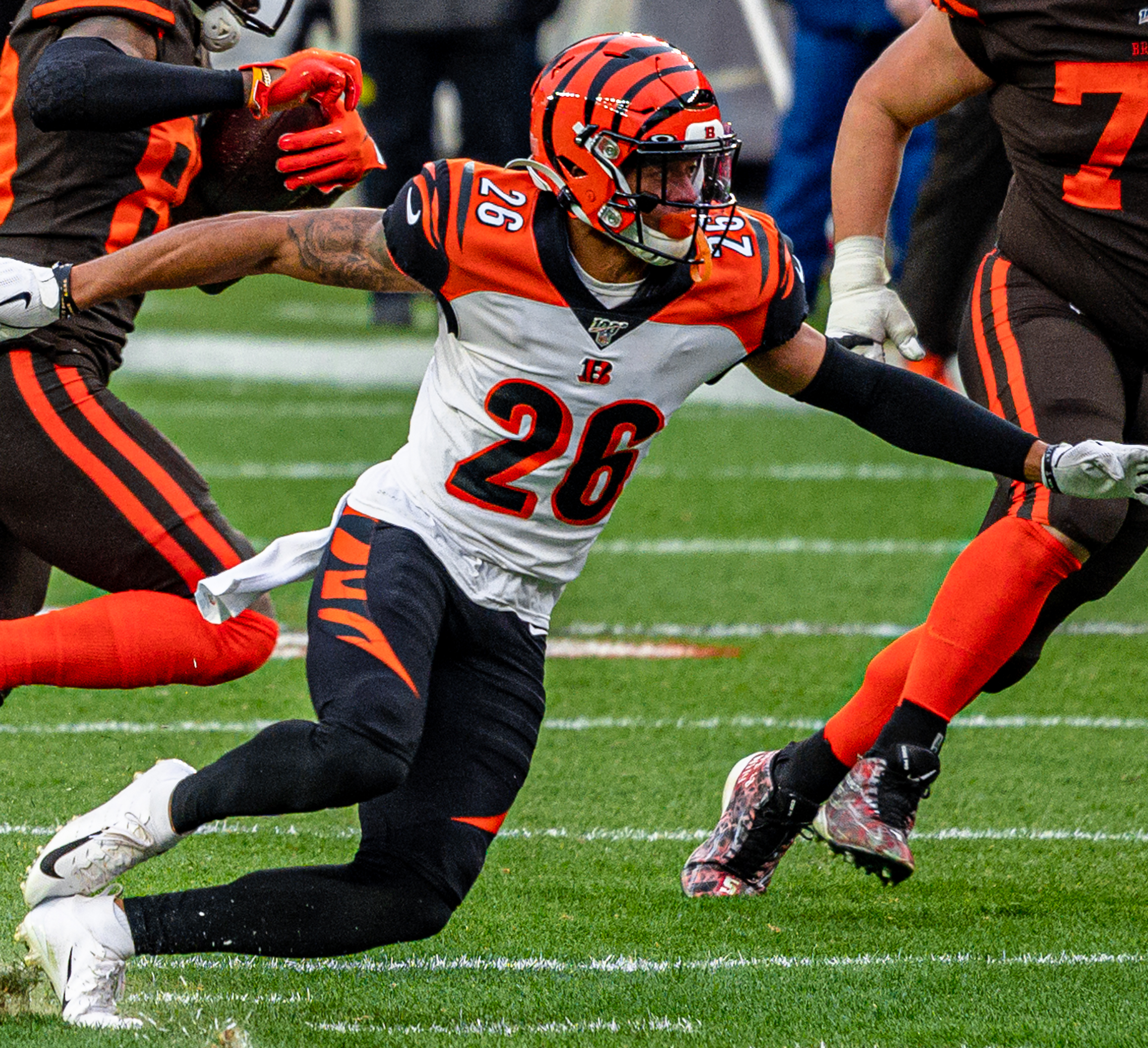
- Mabin with the Cincinnati Bengals in 2019

No. 31, 26, 34, 30, 32
- Position: Cornerback

Personal information
- Born: June 25, 1994 (age 32); Fort Lauderdale, Florida, U.S.
- Listed height: 6 ft 1 in (1.85 m)
- Listed weight: 200 lb (91 kg)

Career information
- High school: Calvary Christian Academy (Fort Lauderdale)
- College: Iowa
- NFL draft: 2017: undrafted

Career history
- Tampa Bay Buccaneers (2017)*; Buffalo Bills (2017); San Francisco 49ers (2017–2018); Cincinnati Bengals (2019); Tennessee Titans (2020); Jacksonville Jaguars (2020); Tennessee Titans (2021)*; Arizona Cardinals (2021)*; Tennessee Titans (2021–2022); Carolina Panthers (2023)*
- * Offseason or practice squad member only

Career NFL statistics
- Total tackles: 64
- Forced fumbles: 1
- Fumble recoveries: 1
- Pass deflections: 7
- Stats at Pro Football Reference

Gregory Mabin (born June 25, 1994) is an American former professional football player who was a cornerback in the National Football League (NFL). He played college football for the Iowa Hawkeyes and was signed by the Tampa Bay Buccaneers as an undrafted free agent in 2017.

== Early life ==
Mabin attended Calvary Christian Academy (Fort Lauderdale, FL), where he played wide receiver, defensive back and kick returner. He totaled 877 yds. and 15 TDs on 52 receptions as a senior, with 1 rushing TD and 2 INTs and a TD on defense. He had 59 receptions for 1,094 yds. and 12 TDs as a junior, with one KO return TD and 2 INTs. As a sophomore, he finished with 42 receptions for 906 yds. and 10 TDs with 1 INT and 1 punt return TD.

In addition to football, Mabin also lettered in basketball and track.

== College career ==
Mabin appeared in 36 games (35 starts) over his five years (2012–16) at Iowa and totaled 144 tackles, 19 PDs, 3 INTs, 2.5 TFLs, 5.0 sacks, 2 FFs and 2 FRs. As a senior in 2016, he started all 9 games and registered 37 tackles, 3 PDs, and 1 FF, earning Honorable Mention All-Big Ten honors. In 2015, appeared in 14 games, finishing with 54 tackles, 10 PDs, 1 FF and 2 INTs. As a sophomore, Mabin appeared in all 13 games (12 starts) and recorded 53 tackles, 6 PDs, 2.0 TFLs, 2 FRs and 1 INT. He did not see game action in 2013 after redshirting in 2012. Mabin transitioned from wide receiver to defensive back for Iowa's 2013 spring practice.

Mabin graduated from the University of Iowa with a degree in health and human physiology.

== Professional career ==
Pre-draft measurables
Height	Weight	Arm length	Hand span	Wingspan
6 ft 1 1/8 in (1.86 m)	200 lb (91 kg)	32 3/4 in (0.83 m)	9 in (0.23 m)	6 ft 5 in (1.96 m)
All values from Pro Day

=== Tampa Bay Buccaneers ===
Mabin signed with the Tampa Bay Buccaneers as an undrafted free agent on May 1, 2017. He was waived by the Buccaneers on May 8, 2017.

=== Buffalo Bills ===
On June 1, 2017, Mabin signed with the Buffalo Bills. He was waived on September 12, 2017, and was signed to the practice squad the next day. He was promoted to the active roster on October 7, 2017. He was waived by the team on October 16, 2017.

=== San Francisco 49ers ===
On October 18, 2017, Mabin was signed to the San Francisco 49ers' practice squad. He was promoted to the active roster on November 1, 2017.

On October 30, 2018, Mabin was waived by the 49ers and was re-signed to the practice squad. On November 8, 2018, Mabin was promoted to the 49ers active roster.

On August 16, 2019, Mabin was waived by the 49ers with an injury designation. He was placed on injured reserve the next day. He was waived on August 26.

=== Cincinnati Bengals ===
On September 24, 2019, Mabin was signed to the Cincinnati Bengals practice squad, and was promoted to the active roster the next day. He was waived on October 7, 2019, and re-signed to the practice squad. He was promoted back to the active roster on October 30.

Mabin re-signed with the Bengals on March 31, 2020. He was waived on September 5, 2020.

=== Tennessee Titans (first stint) ===
On September 21, 2020, Mabin was signed to the Tennessee Titans practice squad. He was placed on the practice squad/COVID-19 list on September 24. He was activated back to the practice squad on October 10, and later released on October 20. He was once again signed to the Titans' practice squad on November 9, 2020. He was signed to the active roster on November 21, 2020. Mabin was waived on November 24, 2020.

=== Jacksonville Jaguars ===
On November 25, 2020, Mabin was claimed off waivers by the Jacksonville Jaguars.

=== Tennessee Titans (second stint) ===
On May 6, 2021, Mabin signed with the Titans. He was placed on injured reserve on August 5, 2021. On August 10, 2021, Mabin was released by the Tennessee Titans with an injury settlement.

=== Arizona Cardinals ===
On October 6, 2021, Mabin was signed to the Arizona Cardinals practice squad.

=== Tennessee Titans (third stint) ===
On October 20, 2021, Mabin was signed by the Titans off the Cardinals practice squad. He re-signed with the team on May 9, 2022. He was released on August 30, 2022. He was re-signed to the practice squad on November 15. He was promoted to the active roster on December 10.

=== Carolina Panthers ===
On June 15, 2023, Mabin signed with the Carolina Panthers. On August 29, 2023, he was released for final roster cuts before the start of the 2023 season.
