= Michael McDowell =

Michael McDowell is the name of:

- Michael McDowell (politician) (born 1951), barrister and an Irish politician
- Michael McDowell (actor), Northern Irish actor
- Michael McDowell (author) (1950–1999), American novelist and screenwriter
- Michael P. Kube-McDowell (born 1954), American science fiction writer
- Michael McDowell (racing driver) (born 1981), American race car driver
- Mike MacDowel (1932–2016), English racing driver
