= Bob Coy =

American pastor (born 1955)

- Born: Robert J. Coy; November 27, 1955 (age 70); Royal Oak, Michigan
- Occupation: Founder Pastor of Calvary Chapel Fort Lauderdale
- Term: 1985–2014
- Successor: Doug Sauder
- Spouse: Diane Coy (m. 1984, div. 2016)

Robert J. "Bob" Coy (born November 27, 1955) is the founder and former senior pastor of Calvary Chapel Fort Lauderdale in Fort Lauderdale, Florida.

On April 3, 2014, he resigned as the Senior Pastor of Calvary Chapel Fort Lauderdale after admitting to committing adultery and having an addiction to pornography. Subsequently, his media ministry, which included radio, television, and digital media, was terminated.

== Biography ==
Coy was born in Royal Oak, Michigan on November 27, 1955.

At the age of 21, he obtained a job at Capitol Records in Detroit. Coy stated, "I was living the life of sex, drugs, and rock n' roll". After multiple traffic tickets, some for driving under the influence, he lost his license at the age of 24. Shortly afterwards, Coy was reported for offering drugs to a band member. Coy then moved to Las Vegas and obtained a job at a property management company. He later became an entertainment director at a casino with an "All-Girl Revue," which Coy said "is another way of saying I ran a strip club." Until 1981, Coy continued to live a lifestyle that he characterized as including sex and drugs.

In December 1981, Coy went to stay with his brother, Jim, who gave him a Bible to read. Soon afterward, Bob resigned from his job at the casino and started working as an associate pastor at a Calvary Chapel in Las Vegas. In 1985, Coy and his wife Diane moved to South Florida, where they founded Calvary Chapel Fort Lauderdale.

== Resignation and scandals ==
In April 2014, Coy resigned as the senior pastor and president of Calvary Chapel Fort Lauderdale after he admitted to adultery and said he had an addiction to pornography. Coy spent a year in Chattanooga, Tennessee, in Calvary Chapel to undergo a restoration process, while the church board appointed Doug Sauder to take Coy's position as Senior Pastor. Coy later divorced, then went to work as a consultant at The Funky Biscuit in Boca Raton, Florida.

In November 2017, Coy was accused of molesting a child from the age of four through her teenage years. Charges were never filed. As a result of the accusations, Coy was fired from his job at The Funky Biscuit.

== Charity work ==
In 1997, 4Kids of South Florida was founded under Coy's direction to care for orphans and children in the foster-care system in South Florida, addressing the need for increased services to keep children from entering foster care.

From the 4Kids website, Coy appears to no longer have current direct involvement with the charity.

== Publications ==
- My God Story. Fort Lauderdale, FL: Calvary Chapel Church, Inc. 2001. p. 178. ISBN 0-9708600-1-3.
- Devotionary. Fort Lauderdale, FL: Calvary Chapel Church, Inc. 2002. p. 265. ISBN 0-9708600-0-5.
- Dreamality. West Monroe, LA: Howard Publishing Co, Inc. 2005. p. 243. ISBN 978-1-58229-447-6.
- The Holy Spirit. Fort Lauderdale, FL: Calvary Chapel Church, Inc. 2008. p. 72. ISBN 978-1-932283-19-8.
- Living in the Active Word volume 1. Fort Lauderdale, FL: Calvary Chapel Church, Inc. 2008. p. 365. ISBN 978-1-932283-28-0.
- Redeeming Relationships. Fort Lauderdale, FL: Calvary Chapel Church, Inc. 2008. p. 211. ISBN 978-1-932283-14-3.
- Living in the Active Word volume 2. Fort Lauderdale, FL: Calvary Chapel Church, Inc. 2009. p. 365. ISBN 978-1-932283-71-6.
- One Surrendered Life. Fort Lauderdale, FL: Calvary Chapel Church, Inc. 2013. p. 235. ISBN 978-1-932283-18-1.
