= Calvary Chapel Fort Lauderdale =

- Calvary Chapel Fort Lauderdale
- Location: 2401 W. Cypress Creek Rd, Fort Lauderdale, Florida
- Country: U.S.
- Denomination: Non-denominational Calvary Chapel
- Website: calvaryftl.org

History
- Founded: July 1985
- Founder: Bob Coy

Calvary Chapel Fort Lauderdale (CCFL) is an evangelical megachurch in Florida, with over 20,000 worshipers attending on average. Founded in 1985 by Bob Coy and his wife Diane, it is affiliated with the Calvary Chapel movement. CCFL is currently led by Pastor Doug Sauder.

In addition to its main campus, CCFL has nine regional campus locations, also in Florida: Plantation, Hollywood, Boca Raton, Florida Keys (Tavernier), West Boca, Boynton Beach, Naples, North Lauderdale, Midtown (Wilton Manors), and a new campus in North Miami (Miami Gardens) planned for opening in Fall 2018. Combined, these nine regional locations minister to over 25,000 people on a weekly basis via video simulcast.

== History ==
In 1980, a 24-year-old Bob Coy left the Las Vegas music industry to become an associate pastor in that city's Calvary Chapel. Five years later, Coy headed to South Florida and founded Calvary Chapel Fort Lauderdale.

As years went on, CCFL's location changed from the Fort Lauderdale beach to a funeral home, a storefront behind Albertsons, and a warehouse.

In 1999, CCFL relocated to a 75-acre (30 ha) tract of land formerly owned by Harris Corporation, which now has a 3,800 seat sanctuary, children and youth ministries, and includes a skateboard park.

In October 2003, CCFL sued Broward County for $1 for its initial refusal to allow the church to display a large cross and sign reading "Jesus is the reason for the season" in a 2-mile (3.2 km) holiday lights attraction at Tradewinds Park in Coconut Creek, which drew around 250,000 visitors each year. Calvary won the suit the next month and was allowed to display the message.

In April 2014, Senior Pastor Bob Coy resigned after confessing to an admitted struggle with adultery and an addiction to pornography. The following month, Doug Sauder was nominated to take Coy's place, and then confirmed by the board of directors as the new lead pastor for Calvary Chapel Fort Lauderdale. In response to the nomination, the church body and those familiar with Pastor Doug Sauder's spiritual character and competency responded with unanimous support and enthusiasm.

In November 2018, CBS News listed Calvary Chapel Fort Lauderdale as the 17th largest megachurch in the United States with about 18,521 weekly visitors and reportedly 30,000 members.

== Affiliated ministries ==
- Calvary Christian Academy – one of the largest private Christian schools in the state of Florida.

== Beliefs ==
Calvary Chapel Fort Lauderdale's mission statement is to "make disciples", coming from the Bible verse Matthew 28:19. Another mission statement of the church is to connect people to God, connect people to people, and connect people to outreach.

CCFL believes that the Bible is the foundation of Christianity and inspired by God. The church believes in the Holy Trinity and that the only way to get into Heaven is by getting "saved" through Jesus Christ.

The church also believes that the act of baptism is not required to become a Christian but does support baptism as a proclamation to the public that a person is saved through Christ.

Pastor Doug Sauder personally expressed support for vaccination against COVID-19 and used Calvary Church's reputation and access to large audiences to promote vaccine education and debunk conspiracies and superstition surrounding the vaccine.

== Controversies ==
=== Child sex abuse ===
In 2008, Calvary Chapel Ft. Lauderdale and Calvary Christian Academy faced a multimillion-dollar lawsuit related to the 2004 adoption of a teenage girl through the church's 4KIDS program. The girl was sexually abused by her adoptive father. The case was dismissed because the abuse occurred in the family home by a family member.

In January 2019, Jesus Mendez Jr., a Calvary Christian Academy IT worker, was arrested on child pornography charges. Mendez worked for the private school associated with the church for two years prior to his arrest and consequential firing; no evidence that children at Calvary Christian Academy were mistreated was revealed. Mendez later changed his not guilty plea to plead nolo contendere.
