= 2013 FedEx 400 =

Race details
- Race 13 of 36 in the 2013 NASCAR Sprint Cup Series
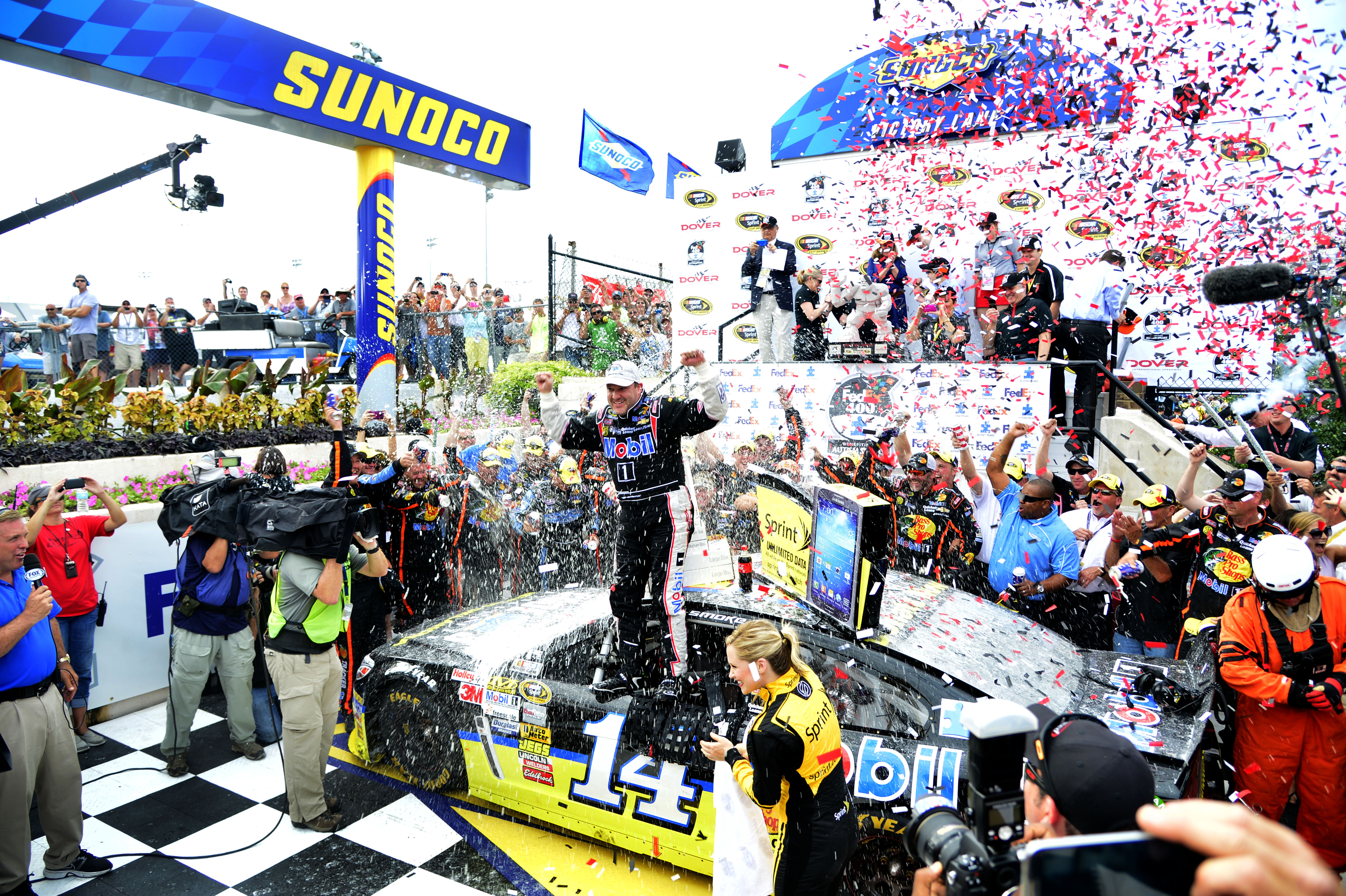
- The winner: Tony Stewart (#14)
- Date: June 2, 2013
- Location: Dover International Speedway, Dover, Delaware, United States
- Course: Permanent racing facility
- Course length: 1 miles (1.6 km)
- Distance: 400 laps, 400 mi (643.737 km)
- Weather: Isolated storms with a high temperature of 84 °F (29 °C); wind out of the SSW at 16 miles per hour (26 km/h).
- Average speed: 123.172 mph (198.226 km/h)

Pole position
Driver	Denny Hamlin	Joe Gibbs Racing
- Time: 22.788 second

Most laps led
Driver	Kyle Busch	Joe Gibbs Racing
- Laps: 150

Winner
No. 14	Tony Stewart	Stewart–Haas Racing

Television in the United States
- Network: Fox
- Announcers: Mike Joy, Darrell Waltrip, Larry McReynolds
- Nielsen ratings: 3.8/9 (5.973 million viewers)

The 2013 FedEx 400 benefiting Autism Speaks was a NASCAR Sprint Cup Series stock car race held on June 2, 2013, at Dover International Speedway in Dover, Delaware, United States. Contested over 400 laps on the 1–mile (1.6 km) oval, it was the thirteenth race of the 2013 Sprint Cup Series championship. Tony Stewart won the race, his first win of the season, snapping a 30–race winless streak, while Juan Pablo Montoya finished second. Jeff Gordon, Kyle Busch, and Brad Keselowski rounded out the top five.

== Report ==
=== Background ===
Dover International Speedway is a four-turn short track oval that is 1 mile (1.6 km) long. The track's turns are banked at twenty-four degrees. The front stretch, the location of the finish line, is banked at nine degrees with the backstretch. The racetrack has seats for 113,000 spectators. Jimmie Johnson was the defending race winner after winning the event in the 2012 race.

Before the race, Johnson was leading the Drivers' Championship with 445 points, while Carl Edwards stood in second with 413 points. Matt Kenseth followed in the third with 394, nine ahead of Clint Bowyer in fourth, and 24 ahead of Kasey Kahne in fifth. Dale Earnhardt Jr., with 364, was in sixth; two ahead of Kevin Harvick, who was scored seventh. Eighth-placed Paul Menard was eleven points ahead of Martin Truex Jr. and twelve ahead of Brad Keselowski in ninth and tenth. Kyle Busch was eleventh with 332, while Aric Almirola completed the first twelve positions with 328 points. In the Manufacturers' Championship, Chevrolet was leading with 83 points, five points ahead of Toyota. Ford was third after recording only 60 points before the race.

=== Entry list ===
(R) - Denotes rookie driver.

(i) - Denotes driver who is ineligible for series driver points.

No.	Driver	Team	Manufacturer
1	Jamie McMurray	Earnhardt Ganassi Racing	Chevrolet
2	Brad Keselowski	Penske Racing	Ford
5	Kasey Kahne	Hendrick Motorsports	Chevrolet
7	Dave Blaney	Tommy Baldwin Racing	Chevrolet
9	Marcos Ambrose	Richard Petty Motorsports	Ford
10	Danica Patrick (R)	Stewart–Haas Racing	Chevrolet
11	Denny Hamlin	Joe Gibbs Racing	Toyota
13	Casey Mears	Germain Racing	Ford
14	Tony Stewart	Stewart–Haas Racing	Chevrolet
15	Clint Bowyer	Michael Waltrip Racing	Toyota
16	Greg Biffle	Roush Fenway Racing	Ford
17	Ricky Stenhouse Jr. (R)	Roush Fenway Racing	Ford
18	Kyle Busch	Joe Gibbs Racing	Toyota
19	Mike Bliss (i)	Humphrey Smith Racing	Toyota
20	Matt Kenseth	Joe Gibbs Racing	Toyota
22	Joey Logano	Penske Racing	Ford
24	Jeff Gordon	Hendrick Motorsports	Chevrolet
27	Paul Menard	Richard Childress Racing	Chevrolet
29	Kevin Harvick	Richard Childress Racing	Chevrolet
30	David Stremme	Swan Racing	Toyota
31	Jeff Burton	Richard Childress Racing	Chevrolet
32	Timmy Hill (R)	FAS Lane Racing	Ford
33	Landon Cassill (i)	Circle Sport	Chevrolet
34	David Ragan	Front Row Motorsports	Ford
35	Josh Wise (i)	Front Row Motorsports	Ford
36	J. J. Yeley	Tommy Baldwin Racing	Chevrolet
38	David Gilliland	Front Row Motorsports	Ford
39	Ryan Newman	Stewart–Haas Racing	Chevrolet
42	Juan Pablo Montoya	Earnhardt Ganassi Racing	Chevrolet
43	Aric Almirola	Richard Petty Motorsports	Ford
44	Scott Riggs	Xxxtreme Motorsports	Ford
47	Bobby Labonte	JTG Daugherty Racing	Toyota
48	Jimmie Johnson	Hendrick Motorsports	Chevrolet
51	Austin Dillon (i)	Phoenix Racing	Chevrolet
55	Mark Martin	Michael Waltrip Racing	Toyota
56	Martin Truex Jr.	Michael Waltrip Racing	Toyota
78	Kurt Busch	Furniture Row Racing	Chevrolet
83	David Reutimann	BK Racing	Toyota
87	Joe Nemechek (i)	NEMCO-Jay Robinson Racing	Toyota
88	Dale Earnhardt Jr.	Hendrick Motorsports	Chevrolet
93	Travis Kvapil	BK Racing	Toyota
98	Michael McDowell	Phil Parsons Racing	Ford
99	Carl Edwards	Roush Fenway Racing	Ford
Official entry list

=== Practice and qualifying ===
Three practice sessions were held before the race. The first session, held on May 31, 2013, was 90 minutes long. The second and third, held a day later on June 1, 2013, were 55 and 60 minutes long. During the first practice session, Johnson was quickest with a time of 22.556, ahead of his team-mate Kahne and Kyle Busch in second and third. Kurt Busch followed in the fourth position, ahead of Jamie McMurray in fifth.

During qualifying, forty-three cars were entered. Denny Hamlin clinched his third pole position of the season, with a lap time of 22.788 seconds. After his qualifying run, Hamlin commented, "When I ran the lap, I wasn't in love with it. Fundamentally, I knew I didn't do that great of a job. I'm still knocking off some rust. This is only my third race back." He was joined on the front row of the grid by Truex Jr. Kyle Busch qualified third, Kenseth took fourth, and Ryan Newman started fifth. Mark Martin, Harvick, Keselowski, Joey Logano, and McMurray completed the first ten positions on the grid.

In the Saturday morning session, Kenseth was quickest, ahead of Kahne and Keselowski in second and third. Kyle and Kurt Busch followed in the fourth and fifth positions. Hamlin, Edwards, Bowyer, Johnson, and Juan Pablo Montoya rounded out ten quickest drivers in the session. In the final practice session for the race, Kurt Busch was quickest with a time of 23.495 seconds. Kenseth followed in second, ahead of Montoya and Johnson in third and fourth. Jeff Gordon, who was 27th quickest in second practice, managed fifth.

=== Race ===
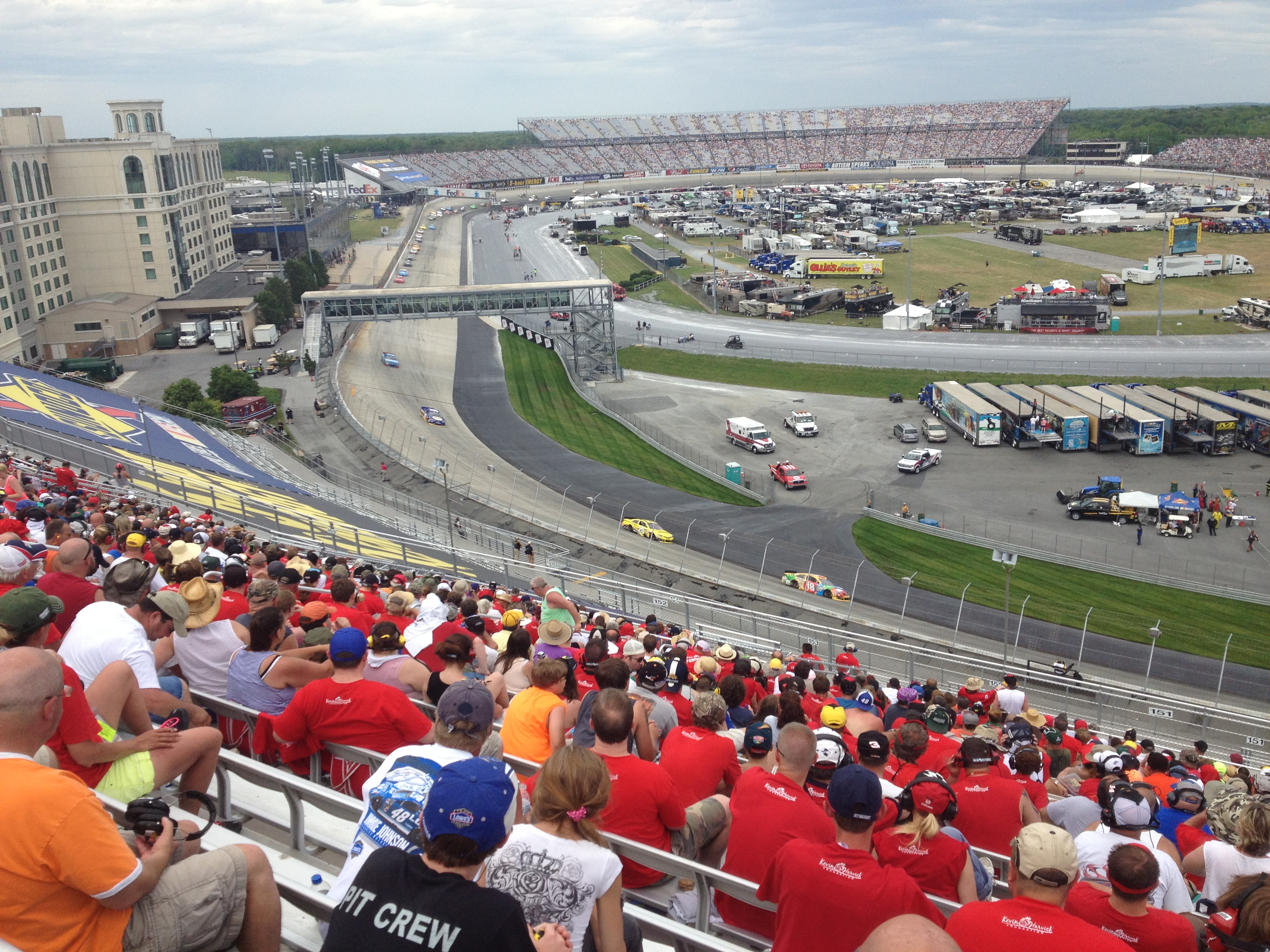
Kyle Busch leads the pack through turn 3 following the first caution due to debris

The green flag was waved at 1:15 pm ET, with Denny Hamlin leading the field. Hamlin got the lead at the green flag over 2nd-place Martin Truex Jr. By lap 12, Matt Kenseth was up to 2nd place and right behind Hamlin. As they battled for the lead, Kyle Busch caught up and took the lead on lap 24. Shortly after lap 30, Danica Patrick was forced to make a green-flag pit stop after contact with David Stremme. Busch continued to lead the race, lapping several cars. He nearly lapped 22nd-place Jimmie Johnson until a round of green-flag pit stops allowed Johnson to stay on the lead lap by pitting early. On lap 81, the first caution of the race occurred for debris in turn 2. Tony Stewart got the free pass on this caution. Following the restart, Busch maintained the lead. On lap 128, there was another caution due to debris in turn 3. On the restart following this caution, Kenseth gained the lead from Busch. On lap 159, race leader Kenseth blew an engine. As a result, Busch regained the lead and the third caution of the day would be brought out on lap 161. Busch maintained the lead after a round of pit stops under the caution. On the restart, he led the race ahead of Truex Jr.

At the halfway point of the race, cloud cover began to increase. Busch's lead narrowed and Johnson caught up to him. Johnson eventually passed Busch for the lead on lap 206. He maintained the lead after a round of green-flag pit stops. On lap 279, Truex Jr. blew an engine, bringing out another caution on lap 280. The leaders pitted during the caution, and Johnson won the battle off pit road. He would lead the race after the restart. On lap 299, there was a wreck involving Ryan Newman and David Gilliland on the backstretch. This wreck brought out the fifth caution of the race on lap 301, in which Hamlin would lead at the restart following different pit strategies. Hamlin continued to maintain the lead until another caution was brought out on lap 318 from a spin by Kasey Kahne in turn 2. All the leaders came to pit road during this caution except Kurt Busch and Jeff Gordon. Ku. Busch led the race following the restart, but Johnson caught up and regained it on lap 326. The seventh caution of the race was brought out on lap 378, when Hamlin got into the turn 1 wall. The leaders pitted under this caution, with Juan Pablo Montoya getting the lead ahead of Johnson on pit road. On the restart following this caution, Johnson took the lead. However, Johnson was black-flagged for jumping the restart on lap 381. This driver was forced to come to pit road on lap 385 and Montoya led the race. On lap 398, Stewart took the lead from Montoya. Stewart went on to win the race, giving him his first win of the season.

=== Post-race ===
Following the race, Keselowski's car failed post-race inspection because the car's front end was too low to the ground, resulting in a six-point penalty for Keselowski and a $25,000 fine for his crew chief Paul Wolfe, who had returned for the first time after a three-week suspension for infractions in the 2013 NRA 500. Car owner, Roger Penske was also penalized six owner's points. An official from Penske Racing said that the infraction was caused by a part failure, but the team is not expected to appeal the penalties.

== Results ==
=== Qualifying ===
Grid	No.	Driver	Team	Manufacturer	Time	Speed
1	11	Denny Hamlin	Joe Gibbs Racing	Toyota	22.788	157.978
2	56	Martin Truex Jr.	Michael Waltrip Racing	Toyota	22.814	157.798
3	18	Kyle Busch	Joe Gibbs Racing	Toyota	22.820	157.756
4	20	Matt Kenseth	Joe Gibbs Racing	Toyota	22.823	157.736
5	39	Ryan Newman	Stewart–Haas Racing	Chevrolet	22.826	157.715
6	55	Mark Martin	Michael Waltrip Racing	Toyota	22.842	157.604
7	29	Kevin Harvick	Richard Childress Racing	Chevrolet	22.850	157.549
8	2	Brad Keselowski	Penske Racing	Ford	22.860	157.480
9	22	Joey Logano	Penske Racing	Ford	22.863	157.460
10	1	Jamie McMurray	Earnhardt Ganassi Racing	Chevrolet	22.871	157.405
11	5	Kasey Kahne	Hendrick Motorsports	Chevrolet	22.879	157.350
12	88	Dale Earnhardt Jr.	Hendrick Motorsports	Chevrolet	22.895	157.240
13	78	Kurt Busch	Furniture Row Racing	Chevrolet	22.922	157.054
14	42	Juan Pablo Montoya	Earnhardt Ganassi Racing	Chevrolet	22.972	156.713
15	15	Clint Bowyer	Michael Waltrip Racing	Toyota	22.995	156.556
16	27	Paul Menard	Richard Childress Racing	Chevrolet	23.051	156.175
17	13	Casey Mears	Germain Racing	Ford	23.052	156.169
18	99	Carl Edwards	Roush Fenway Racing	Ford	23.069	156.054
19	16	Greg Biffle	Roush Fenway Racing	Ford	23.084	155.952
20	24	Jeff Gordon	Hendrick Motorsports	Chevrolet	23.122	155.696
21	33	Landon Cassill	Circle Sport	Chevrolet	23.160	155.440
22	14	Tony Stewart	Stewart–Haas Racing	Chevrolet	23.165	155.407
23	17	Ricky Stenhouse Jr.	Roush Fenway Racing	Ford	23.190	155.239
24	48	Jimmie Johnson	Hendrick Motorsports	Chevrolet	23.195	155.206
25	51	Austin Dillon	Phoenix Racing	Chevrolet	23.204	155.146
26	47	Bobby Labonte	JTG Daugherty Racing	Toyota	23.213	155.086
27	83	David Reutimann	BK Racing	Toyota	23.217	155.059
28	38	David Gilliland	Front Row Motorsports	Ford	23.230	154.972
29	31	Jeff Burton	Richard Childress Racing	Chevrolet	23.274	154.679
30	9	Marcos Ambrose	Richard Petty Motorsports	Ford	23.283	154.619
31	98	Michael McDowell	Phil Parsons Racing	Ford	23.290	154.573
32	19	Mike Bliss	Humphrey Smith Racing	Toyota	23.301	154.500
33	43	Aric Almirola	Richard Petty Motorsports	Ford	23.304	154.480
34	30	David Stremme	Swan Racing	Toyota	23.332	154.295
35	34	David Ragan	Front Row Motorsports	Ford	23.379	153.984
36	87	Joe Nemechek	NEMCO-Jay Robinson Racing	Toyota	23.432	153.636
37	7	Dave Blaney	Tommy Baldwin Racing	Chevrolet	23.444	153.557
38	93	Travis Kvapil	BK Racing	Toyota	23.454	153.492
39	10	Danica Patrick	Stewart–Haas Racing	Chevrolet	23.471	153.381
40	36	J. J. Yeley	Tommy Baldwin Racing	Chevrolet	23.546	152.892
41	35	Josh Wise	Front Row Motorsports	Ford	23.629	152.355
42	32	Timmy Hill	FAS Lane Racing	Ford	23.855	150.912
43	44	Scott Riggs	Xxxtreme Motorsports	Ford	23.887	150.710

=== Race results ===
Pos	Car	Driver	Team	Manufacturer	Laps	Led	Points^{1}
1	14	Tony Stewart	Stewart–Haas Racing	Chevrolet	400	3	47
2	42	Juan Pablo Montoya	Earnhardt Ganassi Racing	Chevrolet	400	19	43
3	24	Jeff Gordon	Hendrick Motorsports	Chevrolet	400	0	41
4	18	Kyle Busch	Joe Gibbs Racing	Toyota	400	150	42
5	2	Brad Keselowski	Penske Racing	Ford	400	2	40
6	15	Clint Bowyer	Michael Waltrip Racing	Toyota	400	0	38
7	22	Joey Logano	Penske Racing	Ford	400	0	37
8	29	Kevin Harvick	Richard Childress Racing	Chevrolet	400	1	37
9	55	Mark Martin	Michael Waltrip Racing	Toyota	400	0	35
10	88	Dale Earnhardt Jr.	Hendrick Motorsports	Chevrolet	400	0	34
11	31	Jeff Burton	Richard Childress Racing	Chevrolet	400	0	33
12	78	Kurt Busch	Furniture Row Racing	Chevrolet	400	8	33
13	17	Ricky Stenhouse Jr.	Roush-Fenway Racing	Ford	400	0	31
14	99	Carl Edwards	Roush Fenway Racing	Ford	400	0	30
15	16	Greg Biffle	Roush-Fenway Racing	Ford	400	0	29
16	13	Casey Mears	Germain Racing	Ford	400	0	28
17	48	Jimmie Johnson	Hendrick Motorsports	Chevrolet	399	143	28
18	43	Aric Almirola	Richard Petty Motorsports	Ford	399	0	26
19	9	Marcos Ambrose	Richard Petty Motorsports	Ford	399	0	25
20	27	Paul Menard	Richard Childress Racing	Chevrolet	399	0	24
21	47	Bobby Labonte	JTG Daugherty Racing	Toyota	399	0	23
22	34	David Ragan	Front Row Motorsports	Ford	397	0	22
23	5	Kasey Kahne	Hendrick Motorsports	Chevrolet	396	2	22
24	10	Danica Patrick	Stewart–Haas Racing	Chevrolet	396	0	20
25	35	Josh Wise	Front Row Motorsports	Ford	395	0	0
26	83	David Reutimann	BK Racing	Toyota	394	0	18
27	51	Austin Dillon	Phoenix Racing	Chevrolet	394	0	0
28	30	David Stremme	Swan Racing	Toyota	394	0	16
29	7	Dave Blaney	Tommy Baldwin Racing	Chevrolet	393	0	15
30	36	J. J. Yeley	Tommy Baldwin Racing	Chevrolet	390	0	14
31	87	Joe Nemechek	NEMCO-Jay Robinson Racing	Toyota	388	0	0
32	33	Landon Cassill	Circle Sport	Chevrolet	388	0	0
33	1	Jamie McMurray	Earnhardt Ganassi Racing	Chevrolet	381	0	11
34	11	Denny Hamlin	Joe Gibbs Racing	Toyota	380	41	11
35	32	Timmy Hill	FAS Lane Racing	Ford	378	0	9
36	39	Ryan Newman	Stewart–Haas Racing	Chevrolet	298	0	8
37	38	David Gilliland	Front Row Motorsports	Ford	296	0	7
38	56	Martin Truex Jr.	Michael Waltrip Racing	Toyota	279	2	7
39	93	Travis Kvapil	BK Racing	Toyota	161	0	5
40	20	Matt Kenseth	Joe Gibbs Racing	Toyota	159	29	5
41	19	Mike Bliss	Humphrey Smith Racing	Toyota	59	0	0
42	98	Michael McDowell	Phil Parsons Racing	Ford	54	0	2
43	44	Scott Riggs	Xxxtreme Motorsports	Ford	16	0	1

Notes

^1 Points include 3 Chase for the Sprint Cup points for winning, 1 point for leading a lap, and 1 point for most laps led.

== Standings after the race ==
Drivers' Championship standings

	Pos	Driver	Points
	1	Jimmie Johnson	473
	2	Carl Edwards	443 (-30)
1	3	Clint Bowyer	423 (-50)
1	4	Matt Kenseth	399 (-74)
2	5	Kevin Harvick	399 (-74)

Manufacturers' Championship standings

Pos	Manufacturer	Points
1	Chevrolet	92
2	Toyota	84 (-8)
3	Ford	64 (-28)

- Note: Only the first twelve positions are included for the driver standings.

Previous race: 2013 Coca-Cola 600	Sprint Cup Series; 2013 season	Next race: 2013 Party in the Poconos 400
