= 2013 Quicken Loans 400 =

Race details
- Race 15 of 36 in the 2013 NASCAR Sprint Cup Series
- 2013 Quicken Loans 400 program cover
- Date: June 16, 2013
- Location: Michigan International Speedway, Brooklyn, Michigan, U.S.
- Course: Permanent racing facility
- Course length: 2 miles (3.2 km)
- Distance: 200 laps, 400 mi (643.737 km)
- Weather: Overcast with a temperature around 78 °F (26 °C); wind out of the SW at 8 miles per hour (13 km/h).
- Average speed: 139.278 mph (224.146 km/h)

Pole position
| Driver | Carl Edwards | Roush Fenway Racing |
- Time: 35.564 seconds

Most laps led
| Driver | Greg Biffle | Roush Fenway Racing |
- Laps: 48

Winner
| No. 16 | Greg Biffle | Roush Fenway Racing |

Television in the United States
- Network: TNT
- Announcers: Adam Alexander, Wally Dallenbach Jr. and Kyle Petty
- Nielsen ratings: 2.8 (4.533 million viewers)

The 2013 Quicken Loans 400 was a NASCAR Sprint Cup Series stock car race held on June 16, 2013, at Michigan International Speedway in Brooklyn, Michigan, United States. Contested over 200 laps on the two–mile (3.2 km) superspeedway, it was the fifteenth race of the 2013 Sprint Cup Series championship. Greg Biffle of Roush Fenway Racing won the race, his only win of the 2013 season and his 19th and final career Cup series win before his death in a plane crash in December of 2025. Kevin Harvick finished second. Martin Truex Jr., Kyle Busch, and Tony Stewart rounded out the top five.

== Report ==
=== Background ===
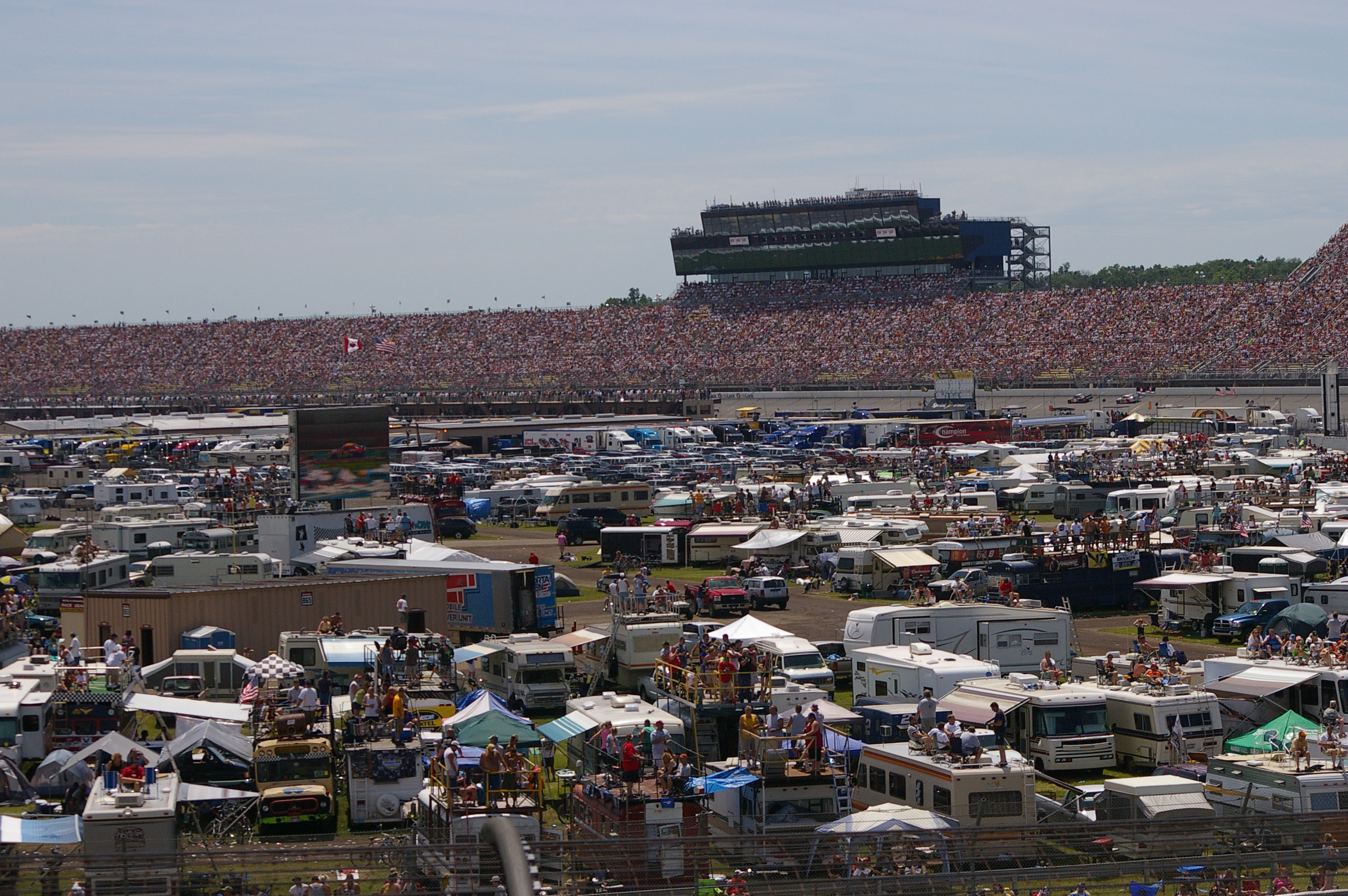
Michigan International Speedway's front stretch and infield.

Michigan International Speedway is a four-turn superspeedway that is 2 miles (3.2 km) long. Opened in 1968, the track's turns are banked at eighteen degrees, while the 3,600-foot-long front stretch, the location of the finish line, is banked at twelve degrees. The back stretch, has a five degree banking and is 2,242 feet long. Michigan International Speedway has a grandstand seating capacity of 71,000 people, with 13,000 seats having been removed from turns 3 and 4 since the race weekend in August 2012. Dale Earnhardt Jr. was the defending race winner, having won the event in 2012.

Before the race, Jimmie Johnson was leading the Drivers' Championship with 521 points, while Carl Edwards stood in second with 470 points. Clint Bowyer followed in the third with 452, thirteen points ahead of fourth-placed Earnhardt Jr. and eighteen ahead of fifth-placed Kevin Harvick. Matt Kenseth, with 418, was in sixth; six ahead of Kyle Busch, who was scored seventh. Eighth-placed Kasey Kahne was two points ahead of ninth-placed Brad Keselowski and five ahead of Greg Biffle, who rounded out the top ten. Jeff Gordon was eleventh with 393, while Paul Menard completed the first twelve positions with 385 points. In the Manufacturers' Championship, Chevrolet was leading with 101 points, thirteen points ahead of Toyota. Ford was third after recording only 70 points before the race.

Veteran driver Jason Leffler, who started the previous week's race at Pocono, was killed in an accident at Bridgeport Speedway in Bridgeport, New Jersey on Wednesday, June 12th, four days prior to this event. Drivers ran with a special "LefTurn" sticker for this event, and Denny Hamlin ran Leffler's 2005 FedEx paint scheme as a tribute.

=== Entry list ===
(R) - Denotes rookie driver.

(i) - Denotes driver who is ineligible for series driver points.

| No. | Driver | Team | Manufacturer |
|---|---|---|---|
| 1 | Jamie McMurray | Earnhardt Ganassi Racing | Chevrolet |
| 2 | Brad Keselowski | Penske Racing | Ford |
| 5 | Kasey Kahne | Hendrick Motorsports | Chevrolet |
| 7 | Dave Blaney | Tommy Baldwin Racing | Chevrolet |
| 9 | Marcos Ambrose | Richard Petty Motorsports | Ford |
| 10 | Danica Patrick (R) | Stewart–Haas Racing | Chevrolet |
| 11 | Denny Hamlin | Joe Gibbs Racing | Toyota |
| 13 | Casey Mears | Germain Racing | Ford |
| 14 | Tony Stewart | Stewart–Haas Racing | Chevrolet |
| 15 | Clint Bowyer | Michael Waltrip Racing | Toyota |
| 16 | Greg Biffle | Roush Fenway Racing | Ford |
| 17 | Ricky Stenhouse Jr. (R) | Roush Fenway Racing | Ford |
| 18 | Kyle Busch | Joe Gibbs Racing | Toyota |
| 19 | Mike Bliss (i) | Humphrey Smith Racing | Toyota |
| 20 | Matt Kenseth | Joe Gibbs Racing | Toyota |
| 21 | Trevor Bayne (i) | Wood Brothers Racing | Ford |
| 22 | Joey Logano | Penske Racing | Ford |
| 24 | Jeff Gordon | Hendrick Motorsports | Chevrolet |
| 27 | Paul Menard | Richard Childress Racing | Chevrolet |
| 29 | Kevin Harvick | Richard Childress Racing | Chevrolet |
| 30 | David Stremme | Swan Racing | Toyota |
| 31 | Jeff Burton | Richard Childress Racing | Chevrolet |
| 32 | Ken Schrader | FAS Lane Racing | Ford |
| 33 | Austin Dillon (i) | Richard Childress Racing | Chevrolet |
| 34 | David Ragan | Front Row Motorsports | Ford |
| 35 | Josh Wise (i) | Front Row Motorsports | Ford |
| 36 | J. J. Yeley | Tommy Baldwin Racing | Chevrolet |
| 38 | David Gilliland | Front Row Motorsports | Ford |
| 39 | Ryan Newman | Stewart–Haas Racing | Chevrolet |
| 42 | Juan Pablo Montoya | Earnhardt Ganassi Racing | Chevrolet |
| 43 | Aric Almirola | Richard Petty Motorsports | Ford |
| 44 | Scott Riggs | Xxxtreme Motorsports | Ford |
| 47 | A. J. Allmendinger | JTG Daugherty Racing | Toyota |
| 48 | Jimmie Johnson | Hendrick Motorsports | Chevrolet |
| 51 | Bobby Labonte | Phoenix Racing | Chevrolet |
| 55 | Mark Martin | Michael Waltrip Racing | Toyota |
| 56 | Martin Truex Jr. | Michael Waltrip Racing | Toyota |
| 78 | Kurt Busch | Furniture Row Racing | Chevrolet |
| 83 | David Reutimann | BK Racing | Toyota |
| 87 | Joe Nemechek (i) | NEMCO-Jay Robinson Racing | Toyota |
| 88 | Dale Earnhardt Jr. | Hendrick Motorsports | Chevrolet |
| 93 | Travis Kvapil | BK Racing | Toyota |
| 98 | Michael McDowell | Phil Parsons Racing | Ford |
| 99 | Carl Edwards | Roush Fenway Racing | Ford |
Official entry list

=== Practice and qualifying ===
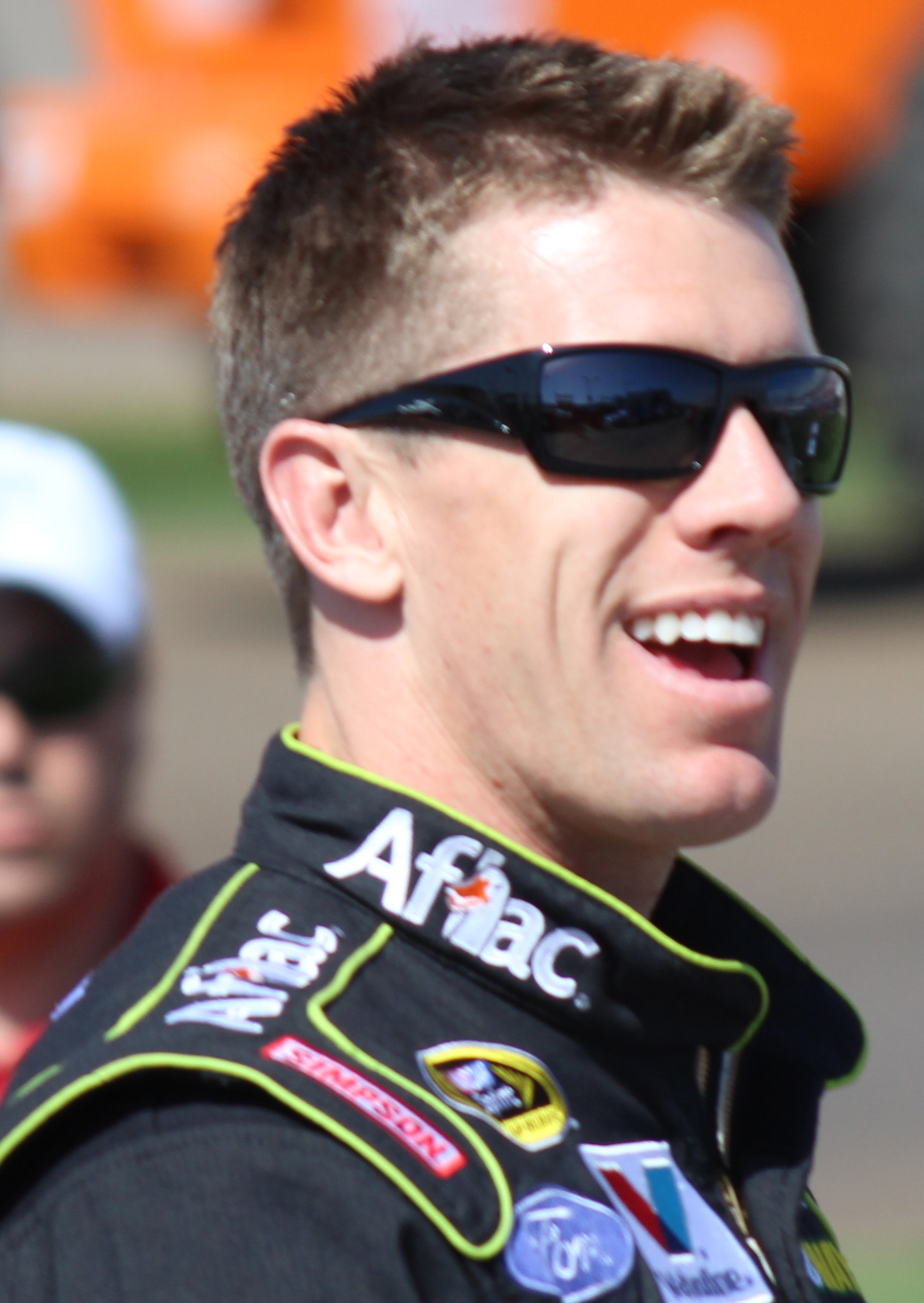
Carl Edwards won the pole position with a speed of 202.452 mph.

Three practice sessions were held before the race. The first session, held on June 14, 2013, was 90 minutes long. The second and third sessions, held a day later on June 15, were 55 and 60 minutes long, respectively. During the first practice session, Kasey Kahne was quickest with a fastest time of 35.889 seconds. Kurt Busch, who was 0.068 seconds slower, followed in second, ahead of Aric Almirola in third and Kevin Harvick in fourth. With a fastest time of 36.014 seconds, Dale Earnhardt Jr. managed to be fifth quickest.

During qualifying, forty-four cars were entered, meaning only one car would not obtain a spot in the race per NASCAR's qualifying procedure. Carl Edwards clinched his twelfth career pole position, with a lap time of 35.564 seconds and a speed of 202.452 miles per hour (325.815 km/h). After his qualifying run, Edwards commented on his results, saying, "This is one lap, and it's good. I'm really happy. The process that's going to put us out front of Hendrick Motorsports and the guys at Joe Gibbs Racing and the rest of the guys we race against on Sunday, this process is just starting. We can use these positive things, like the pole position, hopefully a win, Greg [Biffle's] run last week, we can move forward. We've just got to keep moving forward. There's not a faster car in the place than our car today, and that's a big deal.” He was joined on the front row of the grid by Kurt Busch. Kasey Kahne qualified third, Paul Menard took fourth, and Aric Almirola ranked fifth. Joey Logano, Austin Dillon, Matt Kenseth, Kyle Busch, and Juan Pablo Montoya completed the first ten positions on the grid. The driver who failed to qualify for the race was Scott Riggs.

In the Saturday morning practice session, Kurt Busch was quickest with a fastest lap time of 35.829 seconds, over two-tenths ahead of Carl Edwards in second and Jimmie Johnson in third. Paul Menard and Mark Martin followed in the fourth and fifth positions, respectively. Kasey Kahne, Greg Biffle, Denny Hamlin, Kevin Harvick, and Aric Almirola rounded out the first ten positions. In the final practice session for the race, Kurt Busch remained quickest with a time of 36.480 seconds, 0.651 slower than his fastest time of the second practice session. Kahne followed in second, ahead of Martin in third and Johnson in fourth. Edwards, who was second-quickest in second practice, could only manage fifth.

=== Race ===
The race began with Kurt Busch colliding with pole-sitter Carl Edwards in turn 2 on the opening lap in an attempt to grab the lead. Edwards lost multiple positions as a result, and Kurt Busch emerged in front. The first caution flew on lap 6, after Bobby Labonte got loose and spun in turn 2, collecting Jeff Gordon. A competition caution was thrown on lap 20 for the previous night's rain. Kurt Busch lost the lead to Joey Logano during this caution, and only three laps after the subsequent restart, on lap 29, Busch got loose off of turn two and crashed down the back-straightaway.

Afterward, multiple caution flags and different pit stop strategies gave Joey Logano, Jamie McMurray, Jimmie Johnson, Dale Earnhardt Jr., and Kasey Kahne turns at leading the race. At one point, Johnson rebounded to the second position after falling to twelfth as a result of a mistake made on a restart. On lap 104 and while leading the race, Kahne experienced a right-front tire failure and crashed into the outside wall in turn 1, setting his car ablaze and eliminating him from the event. Fortunately, Kahne was not harmed by the impact or the fire. Johnson took over the lead but lost it to Earnhardt during pit stops. On the restart on lap 113, Earnhardt began to pull away from Kenseth and Biffle as Johnson struggled to battle back to the front. Several laps later, Earnhardt developed engine problems and fell off the pace, giving Johnson (who had successfully passed Kenseth and Biffle) the lead. After a few slow laps, Earnhardt's engine blew up, bringing out another caution on lap 131. After taking four tires in the pits, Johnson fell to 20th and Edwards took the lead ahead of Logano, Kenseth, and Biffle.

Following the restart on lap 136, Biffle worked his way past both Kenseth and Logano into second and proceeded to chase down Edwards, passing him for the lead on lap 150 and quickly pulling away afterward. A caution for a right-front tire failure on the car of McMurray occurred in the middle of the last round of pit stops, trapping Edwards a lap down (although he would immediately receive the free pass). Biffle, who had pitted under the green but did not go a lap down, cycled out as the leader. On the lap of the restart (lap 174), Kenseth got loose off of turn two, causing him to drop several positions while Johnson, who restarted tenth, began to pass cars. Johnson gradually worked his way through the field, eventually passing Harvick to move into second with eight laps to go. However, as Johnson struggled to catch Biffle, he experienced a right-front tire failure off of turn 2 on lap 198, causing him to make contact with the outside wall and relegating him to a 28th-place finish after having to pit to address the tire. Biffle sped away to take the victory over Harvick, Martin Truex Jr., Kyle Busch, and Tony Stewart. Biffle's win was the 615th race victory for the Ford marque and 715th for Ford Motor Company in the Cup Series. It was also the 1,000th race victory for Ford Motor Company in NASCAR's three national touring series.

== Results ==
=== Qualifying ===
| Grid | No. | Driver | Team | Manufacturer | Time | Speed |
|---|---|---|---|---|---|---|
| 1 | 99 | Carl Edwards | Roush Fenway Racing | Ford | 35.564 | 202.452 |
| 2 | 78 | Kurt Busch | Furniture Row Racing | Chevrolet | 35.665 | 201.879 |
| 3 | 5 | Kasey Kahne | Hendrick Motorsports | Chevrolet | 35.783 | 201.213 |
| 4 | 27 | Paul Menard | Richard Childress Racing | Chevrolet | 35.856 | 200.803 |
| 5 | 43 | Aric Almirola | Richard Petty Motorsports | Ford | 35.863 | 200.764 |
| 6 | 22 | Joey Logano | Penske Racing | Ford | 35.870 | 200.725 |
| 7 | 33 | Austin Dillon | Richard Childress Racing | Chevrolet | 35.887 | 200.630 |
| 8 | 20 | Matt Kenseth | Joe Gibbs Racing | Toyota | 35.898 | 200.568 |
| 9 | 18 | Kyle Busch | Joe Gibbs Racing | Toyota | 35.918 | 200.457 |
| 10 | 42 | Juan Pablo Montoya | Earnhardt Ganassi Racing | Chevrolet | 35.920 | 200.445 |
| 11 | 11 | Denny Hamlin | Joe Gibbs Racing | Toyota | 35.927 | 200.406 |
| 12 | 88 | Dale Earnhardt Jr. | Hendrick Motorsports | Chevrolet | 35.982 | 200.100 |
| 13 | 56 | Martin Truex Jr. | Michael Waltrip Racing | Toyota | 35.991 | 200.050 |
| 14 | 14 | Tony Stewart | Stewart–Haas Racing | Chevrolet | 36.038 | 199.789 |
| 15 | 17 | Ricky Stenhouse Jr. | Roush Fenway Racing | Ford | 36.043 | 199.761 |
| 16 | 2 | Brad Keselowski | Penske Racing | Ford | 36.045 | 199.750 |
| 17 | 48 | Jimmie Johnson | Hendrick Motorsports | Chevrolet | 36.056 | 199.689 |
| 18 | 31 | Jeff Burton | Richard Childress Racing | Chevrolet | 36.062 | 199.656 |
| 19 | 16 | Greg Biffle | Roush Fenway Racing | Ford | 36.112 | 199.380 |
| 20 | 51 | Bobby Labonte | Phoenix Racing | Chevrolet | 36.116 | 199.358 |
| 21 | 29 | Kevin Harvick | Richard Childress Racing | Chevrolet | 36.139 | 199.231 |
| 22 | 55 | Mark Martin | Michael Waltrip Racing | Toyota | 36.142 | 199.214 |
| 23 | 9 | Marcos Ambrose | Richard Petty Motorsports | Ford | 36.237 | 198.692 |
| 24 | 13 | Casey Mears | Germain Racing | Ford | 36.255 | 198.593 |
| 25 | 21 | Trevor Bayne | Wood Brothers Racing | Ford | 36.285 | 198.429 |
| 26 | 38 | David Gilliland | Front Row Motorsports | Ford | 36.297 | 198.364 |
| 27 | 15 | Clint Bowyer | Michael Waltrip Racing | Toyota | 36.310 | 198.292 |
| 28 | 1 | Jamie McMurray | Earnhardt Ganassi Racing | Chevrolet | 36.349 | 198.080 |
| 29 | 24 | Jeff Gordon | Hendrick Motorsports | Chevrolet | 36.378 | 197.922 |
| 30 | 98 | Michael McDowell | Phil Parsons Racing | Ford | 36.508 | 197.217 |
| 31 | 34 | David Ragan | Front Row Motorsports | Ford | 36.583 | 196.813 |
| 32 | 47 | A. J. Allmendinger | JTG Daugherty Racing | Toyota | 36.587 | 196.791 |
| 33 | 83 | David Reutimann | BK Racing | Toyota | 36.683 | 196.276 |
| 34 | 30 | David Stremme | Swan Racing | Toyota | 36.685 | 196.266 |
| 35 | 39 | Ryan Newman | Stewart–Haas Racing | Chevrolet | 36.784 | 195.737 |
| 36 | 7 | Dave Blaney | Tommy Baldwin Racing | Chevrolet | 36.826 | 195.514 |
| 37 | 10 | Danica Patrick | Stewart–Haas Racing | Chevrolet | 36.942 | 194.900 |
| 38 | 35 | Josh Wise | Front Row Motorsports | Ford | 37.131 | 193.908 |
| 39 | 32 | Ken Schrader | FAS Lane Racing | Ford | 37.288 | 193.092 |
| 40 | 36 | J. J. Yeley | Tommy Baldwin Racing | Chevrolet | 37.313 | 192.962 |
| 41 | 93 | Travis Kvapil | BK Racing | Toyota | 37.338 | 192.833 |
| 42 | 87 | Joe Nemechek | NEMCO-Jay Robinson Racing | Toyota | 37.502 | 191.990 |
| 43 | 19 | Mike Bliss | Humphrey Smith Racing | Toyota | 38.472 | 187.149 |
Failed to Qualify
| | 44 | Scott Riggs | Xxxtreme Motorsports | Ford | 39.047 | 184.393 |

=== Race results ===
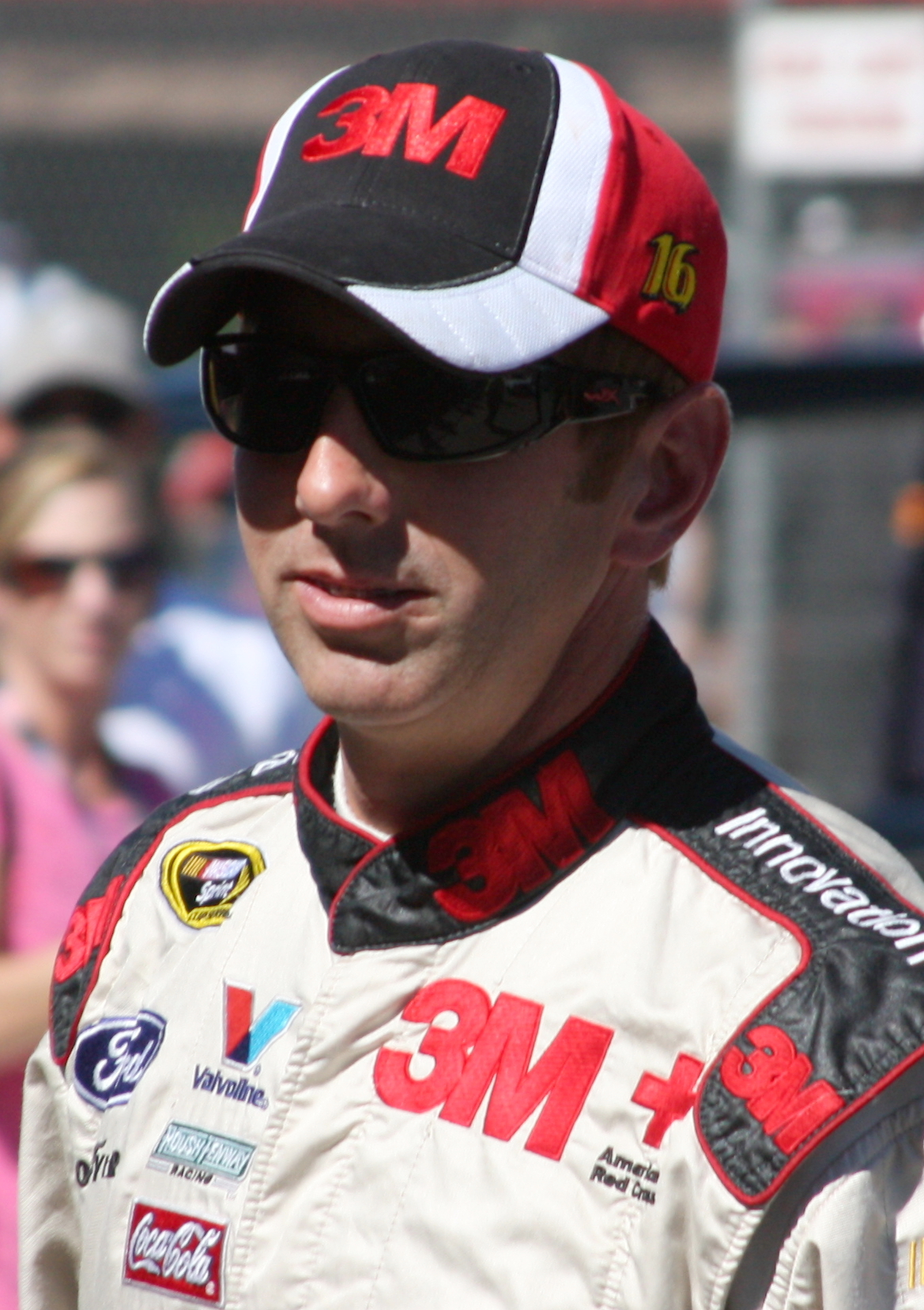
Greg Biffle took his final Cup series victory in this race.

| Pos | No. | Driver | Team | Manufacturer | Laps | Led | Points^{1} |
|---|---|---|---|---|---|---|---|
| 1 | 16 | Greg Biffle | Roush Fenway Racing | Ford | 200 | 48 | 48 |
| 2 | 29 | Kevin Harvick | Richard Childress Racing | Chevrolet | 200 | 0 | 42 |
| 3 | 56 | Martin Truex Jr. | Michael Waltrip Racing | Toyota | 200 | 0 | 41 |
| 4 | 18 | Kyle Busch | Joe Gibbs Racing | Toyota | 200 | 0 | 40 |
| 5 | 14 | Tony Stewart | Stewart–Haas Racing | Chevrolet | 200 | 0 | 39 |
| 6 | 20 | Matt Kenseth | Joe Gibbs Racing | Toyota | 200 | 0 | 38 |
| 7 | 15 | Clint Bowyer | Michael Waltrip Racing | Toyota | 200 | 0 | 37 |
| 8 | 99 | Carl Edwards | Roush Fenway Racing | Ford | 200 | 16 | 37 |
| 9 | 22 | Joey Logano | Penske Racing | Ford | 200 | 21 | 36 |
| 10 | 31 | Jeff Burton | Richard Childress Racing | Chevrolet | 200 | 0 | 34 |
| 11 | 33 | Austin Dillon | Richard Childress Racing | Chevrolet | 200 | 0 | – |
| 12 | 2 | Brad Keselowski | Penske Racing | Ford | 200 | 0 | 32 |
| 13 | 10 | Danica Patrick | Stewart–Haas Racing | Chevrolet | 200 | 0 | 31 |
| 14 | 27 | Paul Menard | Richard Childress Racing | Chevrolet | 200 | 0 | 30 |
| 15 | 21 | Trevor Bayne | Wood Brothers Racing | Ford | 200 | 0 | – |
| 16 | 17 | Ricky Stenhouse Jr. | Roush Fenway Racing | Ford | 200 | 0 | 28 |
| 17 | 43 | Aric Almirola | Richard Petty Motorsports | Ford | 200 | 0 | 27 |
| 18 | 39 | Ryan Newman | Stewart–Haas Racing | Chevrolet | 200 | 0 | 26 |
| 19 | 47 | A. J. Allmendinger | JTG Daugherty Racing | Ford | 200 | 0 | 25 |
| 20 | 42 | Juan Pablo Montoya | Earnhardt Ganassi Racing | Chevrolet | 200 | 0 | 24 |
| 21 | 13 | Casey Mears | Germain Racing | Ford | 200 | 2 | 24 |
| 22 | 38 | David Gilliland | Front Row Motorsports | Ford | 200 | 0 | 22 |
| 23 | 9 | Marcos Ambrose | Richard Petty Motorsports | Ford | 200 | 0 | 21 |
| 24 | 36 | J. J. Yeley | Tommy Baldwin Racing | Chevrolet | 200 | 1 | 21 |
| 25 | 34 | David Ragan | Front Row Motorsports | Ford | 200 | 1 | 20 |
| 26 | 55 | Mark Martin | Michael Waltrip Racing | Toyota | 200 | 0 | 18 |
| 27 | 93 | Travis Kvapil | BK Racing | Toyota | 200 | 2 | 18 |
| 28 | 48 | Jimmie Johnson | Hendrick Motorsports | Chevrolet | 199 | 18 | 17 |
| 29 | 30 | David Stremme | Swan Racing | Toyota | 199 | 0 | 15 |
| 30 | 11 | Denny Hamlin | Joe Gibbs Racing | Toyota | 199 | 0 | 14 |
| 31 | 7 | Dave Blaney | Tommy Baldwin Racing | Chevrolet | 199 | 0 | 13 |
| 32 | 83 | David Reutimann | BK Racing | Toyota | 198 | 0 | 12 |
| 33 | 1 | Jamie McMurray | Earnhardt Ganassi Racing | Chevrolet | 196 | 21 | 12 |
| 34 | 32 | Ken Schrader | FAS Lane Racing | Ford | 195 | 0 | 10 |
| 35 | 78 | Kurt Busch | Furniture Row Racing | Chevrolet | 193 | 21 | 10 |
| 36 | 87 | Joe Nemechek | NEMCO-Jay Robinson Racing | Toyota | 193 | 0 | – |
| 37 | 88 | Dale Earnhardt Jr. | Hendrick Motorsports | Chevrolet | 131 | 34 | 8 |
| 38 | 5 | Kasey Kahne | Hendrick Motorsports | Chevrolet | 103 | 14 | 7 |
| 39 | 24 | Jeff Gordon | Hendrick Motorsports | Chevrolet | 52 | 0 | 5 |
| 40 | 35 | Josh Wise | Front Row Motorsports | Ford | 51 | 0 | – |
| 41 | 19 | Mike Bliss | Humphrey Smith Racing | Toyota | 50 | 0 | – |
| 42 | 98 | Michael McDowell | Phil Parsons Racing | Ford | 36 | 1 | 3 |
| 43 | 51 | Bobby Labonte | Phoenix Racing | Chevrolet | 5 | 0 | 1 |

Notes

^1 Points include 3 Chase for the Sprint Cup points for winning, 1 point for leading a lap, and 1 point for most laps led.

== Standings after the race ==
Drivers' Championship standings

| | Pos | Driver | Points |
|---|---|---|---|
| | 1 | Jimmie Johnson | 538 |
| | 2 | Carl Edwards | 507 (-31) |
| | 3 | Clint Bowyer | 489 (-49) |
| 1 | 4 | Kevin Harvick | 476 (-62) |
| 1 | 5 | Matt Kenseth | 456 (-82) |

Manufacturers' Championship standings

| Pos | Manufacturer | Points |
|---|---|---|
| 1 | Chevrolet | 107 |
| 2 | Toyota | 92 (-15) |
| 3 | Ford | 79 (-28) |

- Note: Only the first twelve positions are included for the driver standings.

| Previous race: 2013 Party in the Poconos 400 | Sprint Cup Series; 2013 season | Next race: 2013 Toyota/Save Mart 350 |
