= 2013 Party in the Poconos 400 =

Race details
- Race 14 of 36 in the 2013 NASCAR Sprint Cup Series
- Date: June 9, 2013
- Location: Pocono Raceway, Long Pond, Pennsylvania
- Course: Permanent racing facility
- Course length: 2.5 miles (4 km)
- Distance: 160 laps, 400 mi (643.737 km)
- Weather: Overcast with a temperature around 72 °F (22 °C); wind out of the WNW at 9 miles per hour (14 km/h).
- Average speed: 144.202 mph (232.071 km/h)

Pole position
Driver	Jimmie Johnson	Hendrick Motorsports
- Time: 2013 Owner Points

Most laps led
Driver	Jimmie Johnson	Hendrick Motorsports
- Laps: 128

Winner
No. 48	Jimmie Johnson	Hendrick Motorsports

Television in the United States
- Network: TNT
- Announcers: Adam Alexander, Wally Dallenbach Jr. and Kyle Petty
- Nielsen ratings: 2.8/7 (4.358 million viewers)

The 2013 Party in the Poconos 400 was a NASCAR Sprint Cup Series stock car race held on June 9, 2013, at Pocono Raceway in Long Pond, Pennsylvania, United States. Contested over 160 laps on the 2.5–mile (4 km) triangular superspeedway, it was the fourteenth race of the 2013 Sprint Cup Series championship. Jimmie Johnson of Hendrick Motorsports won the race, his third win of the 2013 season, while Greg Biffle finished second. Dale Earnhardt Jr., Tony Stewart, and Ryan Newman rounded out the top five.

This was the final NASCAR race for Jason Leffler before his death in a sprint car crash on June 12, 2013.

== Report ==
=== Background ===
Pocono Raceway, the race track where the race was held.

Pocono Raceway is a three-turn superspeedway that is 2.5 miles (4.0 km) long. The track's turns are banked differently; the first is banked at 14°, the second turn at 8° and the final turn with 6°. However, each of the three straightaways are banked at 2°. The front stretch at Pocono Raceway is 3,740 feet long, the longest at the track. The back stretch, is 3,055 feet long, while the short stretch, which connects turn two with turn three, is only 1,780 feet long. Joey Logano was the defending race winner after winning the race in 2012.

Before the race, Johnson was leading the Drivers' Championship with 473 points, while Carl Edwards stood in second with 443 points. Clint Bowyer followed in the third with 423, 24 points ahead of Matt Kenseth and Kevin Harvick in fourth and fifth. Dale Earnhardt Jr., with 398, was in sixth; six ahead of Kasey Kahne, who was scored seventh. Eighth-placed Kyle Busch was three points ahead of Paul Menard and five ahead of Brad Keselowski in ninth and tenth. Jeff Gordon was eleventh with 361, while Aric Almirola completed the first twelve positions with 354 points. In the Manufacturers' Championship, Chevrolet was leading with 92 points, eight points ahead of Toyota. Ford was third after recording only 64 points before the race.

=== Entry list ===
(R) - Denotes rookie driver.

(i) - Denotes driver who is ineligible for series driver points.

No.	Driver	Team	Manufacturer
1	Jamie McMurray	Earnhardt Ganassi Racing	Chevrolet
2	Brad Keselowski	Penske Racing	Ford
5	Kasey Kahne	Hendrick Motorsports	Chevrolet
7	Dave Blaney	Tommy Baldwin Racing	Chevrolet
9	Marcos Ambrose	Richard Petty Motorsports	Ford
10	Danica Patrick (R)	Stewart–Haas Racing	Chevrolet
11	Denny Hamlin	Joe Gibbs Racing	Toyota
13	Casey Mears	Germain Racing	Ford
14	Tony Stewart	Stewart–Haas Racing	Chevrolet
15	Clint Bowyer	Michael Waltrip Racing	Toyota
16	Greg Biffle	Roush Fenway Racing	Ford
17	Ricky Stenhouse Jr. (R)	Roush Fenway Racing	Ford
18	Kyle Busch	Joe Gibbs Racing	Toyota
19	Jason Leffler	Humphrey Smith Racing	Toyota
20	Matt Kenseth	Joe Gibbs Racing	Toyota
22	Joey Logano	Penske Racing	Ford
24	Jeff Gordon	Hendrick Motorsports	Chevrolet
27	Paul Menard	Richard Childress Racing	Chevrolet
29	Kevin Harvick	Richard Childress Racing	Chevrolet
30	David Stremme	Swan Racing	Toyota
31	Jeff Burton	Richard Childress Racing	Chevrolet
32	Timmy Hill (R)	FAS Lane Racing	Ford
33	Landon Cassill (i)	Circle Sport	Chevrolet
34	David Ragan	Front Row Motorsports	Ford
35	Josh Wise (i)	Front Row Motorsports	Ford
36	J. J. Yeley	Tommy Baldwin Racing	Chevrolet
38	David Gilliland	Front Row Motorsports	Ford
39	Ryan Newman	Stewart–Haas Racing	Chevrolet
42	Juan Pablo Montoya	Earnhardt Ganassi Racing	Chevrolet
43	Aric Almirola	Richard Petty Motorsports	Ford
44	Scott Riggs	Xxxtreme Motorsports	Ford
47	Bobby Labonte	JTG Daugherty Racing	Toyota
48	Jimmie Johnson	Hendrick Motorsports	Chevrolet
51	A. J. Allmendinger	Phoenix Racing	Chevrolet
55	Mark Martin	Michael Waltrip Racing	Toyota
56	Martin Truex Jr.	Michael Waltrip Racing	Toyota
78	Kurt Busch	Furniture Row Racing	Chevrolet
83	David Reutimann	BK Racing	Toyota
87	Joe Nemechek (i)	NEMCO-Jay Robinson Racing	Toyota
88	Dale Earnhardt Jr.	Hendrick Motorsports	Chevrolet
93	Travis Kvapil	BK Racing	Toyota
98	Michael McDowell	Phil Parsons Racing	Ford
99	Carl Edwards	Roush Fenway Racing	Ford
Official entry list

=== Practice and qualifying ===
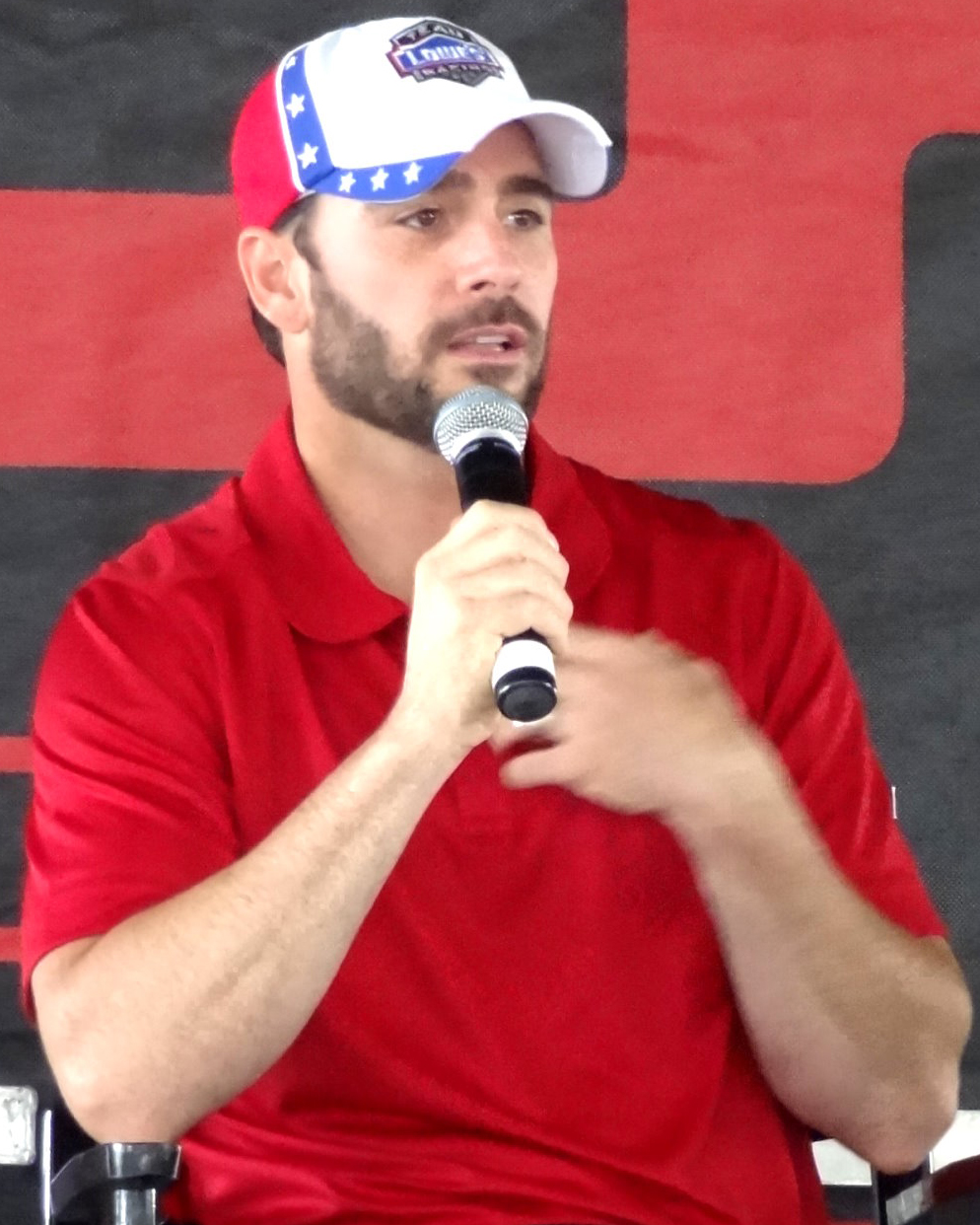
Jimmie Johnson was rewarded the pole position after rain showers cancelled qualifying.

Three practice sessions were held before the race. The first session, scheduled on June 7, 2013 for 90 minutes, was canceled because of rain showers. The second and third, held a day later on June 8, 2013, were 50 and 60 minutes long.

Forty-three cars were entered for qualifying. However, wet weather soaked the track, therefore canceling the session and making the owner's points championship determine the qualifying grid. Johnson, whose owner was first in the owner's championship before the race, was rewarded the pole position. He was joined on the front row of the grid by Edwards. Bowyer was third, Kenseth took fourth, ahead of Earnhardt Jr. who started fifth. Kahne, Kyle Busch, Menard, Keselowski and Gordon rounded out the first ten positions.

In the Saturday morning session, Johnson was quickest, ahead of Edwards and Kurt Busch in second and third. Marcos Ambrose and Harvick followed in the fourth and fifth positions. Kyle Busch, Tony Stewart, Earnhardt Jr., Keselowski, and Juan Pablo Montoya rounded out the first ten positions. In the final practice session for the race, Kurt Busch was quickest with a time of 51.331 seconds. Johnson followed in second, ahead of Edwards and Stewart in third and fourth. Ryan Newman, who was fifteenth quickest in second practice, managed fifth.

== Results ==
=== Qualifying ===
Grid	No.	Driver	Team	Manufacturer	Time	Speed
1	48	Jimmie Johnson	Hendrick Motorsports	Chevrolet	—	
2	99	Carl Edwards	Roush Fenway Racing	Ford	—	
3	15	Clint Bowyer	Michael Waltrip Racing	Toyota	—	
4	20	Matt Kenseth	Joe Gibbs Racing	Toyota	—	
5	29	Kevin Harvick	Richard Childress Racing	Chevrolet	—	
6	88	Dale Earnhardt Jr.	Hendrick Motorsports	Chevrolet	—	
7	5	Kasey Kahne	Hendrick Motorsports	Chevrolet	—	
8	18	Kyle Busch	Joe Gibbs Racing	Toyota	—	
9	27	Paul Menard	Richard Childress Racing	Chevrolet	—	
10	2	Brad Keselowski	Penske Racing	Ford	—	
11	24	Jeff Gordon	Hendrick Motorsports	Chevrolet	—	
12	43	Aric Almirola	Richard Petty Motorsports	Ford	—	
13	16	Greg Biffle	Roush Fenway Racing	Ford	—	
14	55	Mark Martin	Michael Waltrip Racing	Toyota	—	
15	56	Martin Truex Jr.	Michael Waltrip Racing	Toyota	—	
16	17	Ricky Stenhouse Jr.	Roush Fenway Racing	Ford	—	
17	11	Denny Hamlin	Joe Gibbs Racing	Toyota	—	
18	51	A. J. Allmendinger	Phoenix Racing	Chevrolet	—	
19	14	Tony Stewart	Stewart–Haas Racing	Chevrolet	—	
20	78	Kurt Busch	Furniture Row Racing	Chevrolet	—	
21	22	Joey Logano	Penske Racing	Ford	—	
22	1	Jamie McMurray	Earnhardt Ganassi Racing	Chevrolet	—	
23	39	Ryan Newman	Stewart–Haas Racing	Chevrolet	—	
24	31	Jeff Burton	Richard Childress Racing	Chevrolet	—	
25	42	Juan Pablo Montoya	Earnhardt Ganassi Racing	Chevrolet	—	
26	9	Marcos Ambrose	Richard Petty Motorsports	Ford	—	
27	13	Casey Mears	Germain Racing	Ford	—	
28	34	David Ragan	Front Row Motorsports	Ford	—	
29	47	Bobby Labonte	JTG Daugherty Racing	Toyota	—	
30	10	Danica Patrick	Stewart–Haas Racing	Chevrolet	—	
31	38	David Gilliland	Front Row Motorsports	Ford	—	
32	7	Dave Blaney	Tommy Baldwin Racing	Chevrolet	—	
33	30	David Stremme	Swan Racing	Toyota	—	
34	83	David Reutimann	BK Racing	Toyota	—	
35	36	J. J. Yeley	Tommy Baldwin Racing	Chevrolet	—	
36	35	Josh Wise	Front Row Motorsports	Ford	—	
37	33	Landon Cassill	Circle Sport	Chevrolet	—	
38	32	Timmy Hill	FAS Lane Racing	Ford	—	
39	93	Travis Kvapil	BK Racing	Toyota	—	
40	87	Joe Nemechek	NEMCO-Jay Robinson Racing	Toyota	—	
41	98	Michael McDowell	Phil Parsons Racing	Ford	—	
42	19	Jason Leffler	Humphrey Smith Racing	Toyota	—	
43	44	Scott Riggs	Xxxtreme Motorsports	Ford	—	

=== Race results ===
Pos	No.	Driver	Team	Manufacturer	Laps	Led	Points^{1}
1	48	Jimmie Johnson	Hendrick Motorsports	Chevrolet	160	128	48
2	16	Greg Biffle	Roush Fenway Racing	Ford	160	0	42
3	88	Dale Earnhardt Jr.	Hendrick Motorsports	Chevrolet	160	0	41
4	14	Tony Stewart	Stewart–Haas Racing	Chevrolet	160	0	40
5	39	Ryan Newman	Stewart–Haas Racing	Chevrolet	160	19	40
6	18	Kyle Busch	Joe Gibbs Racing	Toyota	160	0	38
7	78	Kurt Busch	Furniture Row Racing	Chevrolet	160	0	37
8	11	Denny Hamlin	Joe Gibbs Racing	Toyota	160	0	36
9	29	Kevin Harvick	Richard Childress Racing	Chevrolet	160	0	35
10	22	Joey Logano	Penske Racing	Ford	160	0	34
11	31	Jeff Burton	Richard Childress Racing	Chevrolet	160	0	33
12	24	Jeff Gordon	Hendrick Motorsports	Chevrolet	160	0	32
13	1	Jamie McMurray	Earnhardt Ganassi Racing	Chevrolet	160	0	31
14	42	Juan Pablo Montoya	Earnhardt Ganassi Racing	Chevrolet	160	0	30
15	15	Clint Bowyer	Michael Waltrip Racing	Toyota	160	0	29
16	2	Brad Keselowski	Penske Racing	Ford	160	4	29
17	9	Marcos Ambrose	Richard Petty Motorsports	Ford	160	0	27
18	99	Carl Edwards	Roush Fenway Racing	Ford	160	9	27
19	55	Mark Martin	Michael Waltrip Racing	Chevrolet	160	0	25
20	93	Travis Kvapil	BK Racing	Toyota	160	0	24
21	43	Aric Almirola	Richard Petty Motorsports	Ford	160	0	23
22	13	Casey Mears	Germain Racing	Ford	160	0	22
23	56	Martin Truex Jr.	Michael Waltrip Racing	Toyota	160	0	21
24	38	David Gilliland	Front Row Motorsports	Ford	160	0	20
25	20	Matt Kenseth	Joe Gibbs Racing	Toyota	160	0	19
26	17	Ricky Stenhouse Jr.	Roush Fenway Racing	Ford	160	0	18
27	47	Bobby Labonte	JTG Daugherty Racing	Toyota	160	0	17
28	30	David Stremme	Swan Racing	Toyota	160	0	16
29	10	Danica Patrick	Stewart–Haas Racing	Chevrolet	160	0	15
30	27	Paul Menard	Richard Childress Racing	Chevrolet	160	0	14
31	7	Dave Blaney	Tommy Baldwin Racing	Chevrolet	160	0	13
32	83	David Reutimann	BK Racing	Toyota	159	0	12
33	51	A. J. Allmendinger	Phoenix Racing	Chevrolet	158	0	11
34	35	Josh Wise	Front Row Motorsports	Ford	157	0	–
35	32	Timmy Hill	FAS Lane Racing	Ford	156	0	9
36	5	Kasey Kahne	Hendrick Motorsports	Chevrolet	141	0	8
37	34	David Ragan	Front Row Motorsports	Ford	121	0	7
38	33	Landon Cassill	Circle Sport	Chevrolet	70	0	–
39	36	J. J. Yeley	Tommy Baldwin Racing	Chevrolet	39	0	5
40	98	Michael McDowell	Phil Parsons Racing	Ford	33	0	4
41	44	Scott Riggs	Xxxtreme Motorsports	Ford	28	0	3
42	87	Joe Nemechek	NEMCO-Jay Robinson Racing	Toyota	11	0	–
43	19	Jason Leffler	Humphrey Smith Racing	Toyota	8	0	1

Notes

^1 Points include 3 Chase for the Sprint Cup points for winning, 1 point for leading a lap, and 1 point for most laps led.

== Standings after the race ==
Drivers' Championship standings

	Pos	Driver	Points
	1	Jimmie Johnson	521
	2	Carl Edwards	470 (–51)
	3	Clint Bowyer	452 (–69)
2	4	Dale Earnhardt Jr.	439 (–82)
	5	Kevin Harvick	434 (–87)

Manufacturers' Championship standings

Pos	Manufacturer	Points
1	Chevrolet	101
2	Toyota	90 (–11)
3	Ford	68 (–33)

- Note: Only the first twelve positions are included for the driver standings.

Previous race: 2013 FedEx 400	Sprint Cup Series; 2013 season	Next race: 2013 Quicken Loans 400
