= Scott Riggs =

American racing driver (born 1971)

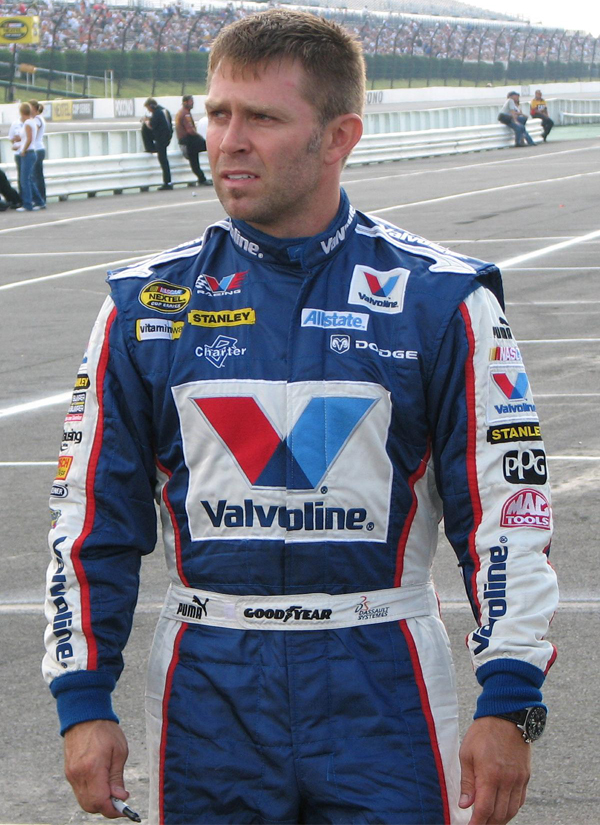
- Riggs in 2007
- Born: Russell Scott Riggs; January 1, 1971 (age 55); Bahama, North Carolina, U.S.
- Achievements: 1999 Myrtle Beach 400 Winner; 1999 Thanksgiving All-Star Classic Winner
- Awards: 2002 NASCAR Busch Series Rookie of the Year; 2003 NASCAR Busch Series Most Popular Driver

NASCAR Cup Series career
- 208 races run over 10 years
- 2013 position: 47th
- Best finish: 20th (2006)
- First race: 2004 Daytona 500 (Daytona)
- Last race: 2013 Sylvania 300 (Loudon)
Wins	Top tens	Poles
0	16	3

NASCAR O'Reilly Auto Parts Series career
- 115 races run over 9 years
- 2013 position: 119th
- Best finish: 6th (2003)
- First race: 2002 EAS/GNC Live Well 300 (Daytona)
- Last race: 2013 Alliance Truck Parts 250 (Michigan)
- First win: 2002 Pepsi 300 (Nashville)
- Last win: 2003 Trace Adkins Chrome 300 (Nashville)
Wins	Top tens	Poles
4	35	3

NASCAR FedEx Freight Truck Series career
- 60 races run over 7 years
- 2014 position: 50th
- Best finish: 5th (2001)
- First race: 1999 Power Stroke 200 by Ford (IRP)
- Last race: 2014 Lucas Oil 200 (Dover)
- First win: 2001 Advance Auto Parts 250 (Martinsville)
- Last win: 2001 Sears Craftsman 175 (Cicero)
Wins	Top tens	Poles
5	26	5

NASCAR Mexico Series career
- 1 race run over 1 year
- Best finish: 45th (2010)
- First race: 2010 Pennzoil 240 (Aguascalientes)
Wins	Top tens	Poles
0	0	0
- Statistics up to date as of May 30, 2014.

Russell Scott Riggs (born January 1, 1971) is an American former professional stock car racing driver. He last competed in the No. 92 for RBR Enterprises in the NASCAR Camping World Truck Series.

== Racing career ==
=== Early career ===
Riggs was born in Bahama, North Carolina, and began his racing career at the age of 14 in the American Motorcycle Association, where he won the State Championship in North Carolina two years in a row. At age 17, he began racing the NASCAR mini stock division, and won 12 races over his first three seasons. He continued to race in that series over the next decade, and was a two-time champion at Southern National Speedway.

In 1999, Riggs made his major-league NASCAR debut in the Craftsman Truck Series at Indianapolis Raceway Park, driving the No. 84 for Long Brothers Racing. He started seventh and finished 19th. He also competed at Richmond International Raceway, where he finished 23rd. In 2000, he finished ninth at Martinsville Speedway for Long, when he was hired to drive the No. 86 Dodge Ram for Impact Motorsports, where he had seven top-tens. Towards the end of the season, he was released from Impact, and competed in one final race at California Speedway for Brevak Racing, finishing 16th. The following season, he drove for Ultra Motorsports, where he picked up five wins, the first coming at Martinsville. He finished fifth in points at the end of the season.

=== Nationwide Series ===
In 2002, Riggs moved to the Busch Series to drive the No. 10 Ford Taurus for ppc Racing. He won his first race at Nashville Superspeedway, then won again two weeks later at California. He finished tenth in points at the end of the season, earning him Rookie of the Year honors. The next season, he picked up two more wins including a thrilling last-lap pass for a victory at Gateway International Raceway after Mike Bliss ran out of gas just after the white flag, scored the other win at Nashville, and finished sixth in points as part of the top-six going for the title at Homestead, but his hopes ended after he crashed after the start of the race. He also won the Most Popular Driver award.

Riggs returned to the NASCAR Nationwide Series in 2010 to drive the No. 09 Ford Fusion for RAB Racing with Brack Maggard. After the February 27 race at Las Vegas, Riggs sat tenth in the series point standings. However, despite strong and consistent runs, Riggs was unable to bring sponsorship to the team and was released after the Nashville 300. On May 28, 2010, Riggs signed with Richard Childress Racing to drive the No. 21 Chevrolet Impala for the Federated Auto Parts 300 at Nashville Superspeedway and for the Meijer 300 at Kentucky Speedway, while sharing duties with Clint Bowyer for the remainder of the season. At Nashville, Riggs recorded his first top-ten of the season, finishing ninth. He also finished ninth at Kentucky. In 2011, Riggs made twelve starts in the Nationwide Series for R3 Motorsports, with a best finish of 13th at Darlington.

=== Sprint Cup Series ===
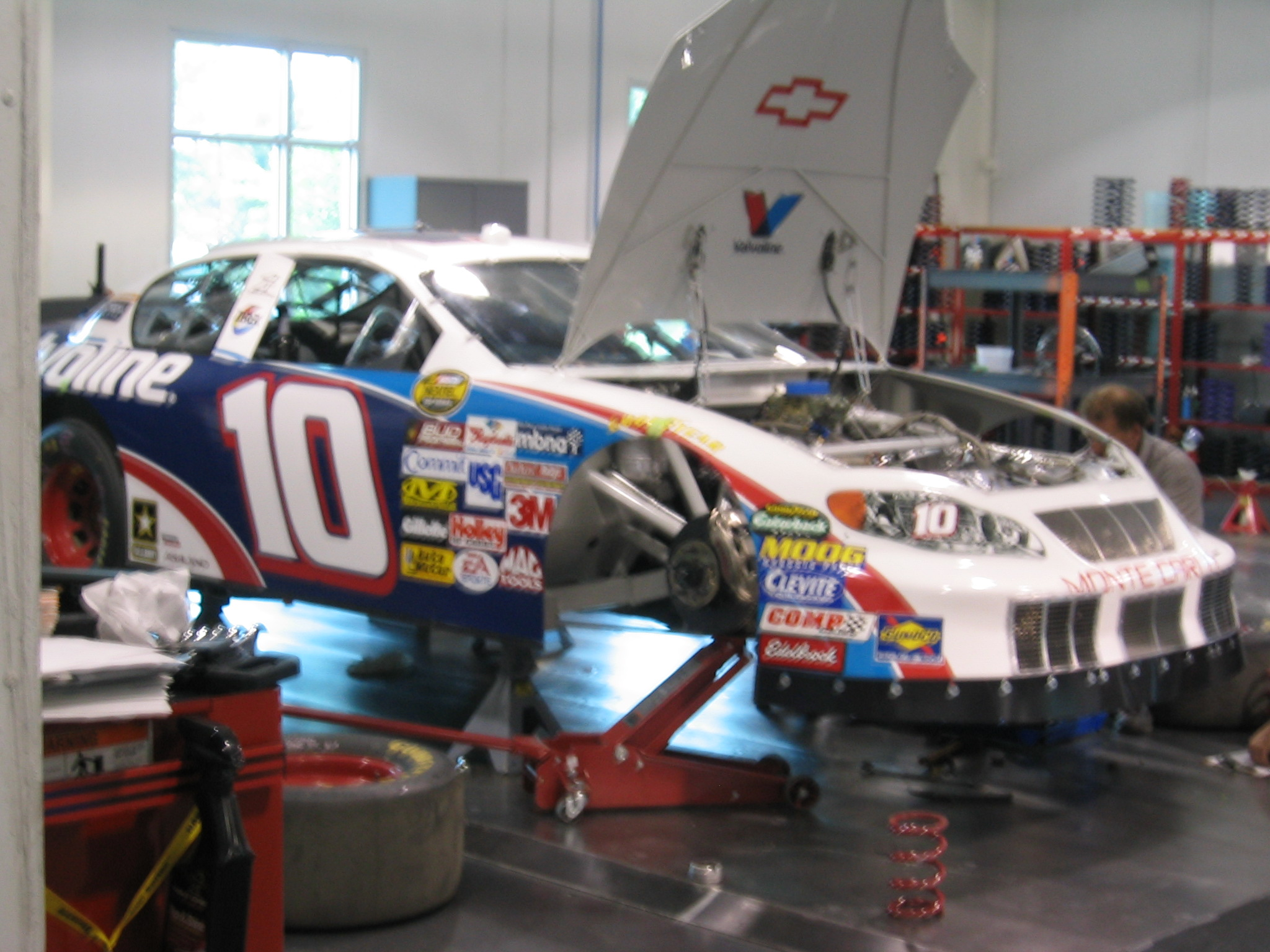
Riggs' No. 10 Chevrolet from 2005.

In 2004, Riggs signed to drive the No. 10 Chevrolet Monte Carlo for MB2 Motorsports. Qualifying for all but one race that season, he had a fifth-place finish at Dover International Speedway and finished 29th in points, fifth in the Rookie of the Year standings. In 2005, he won his first pole at Martinsville, and went on to have a second-place finish at Michigan.

At the end of the season, Riggs and Valvoline left for Evernham Motorsports taking the No. 10 with him. In 2006, Riggs failed to make the Daytona 500 because of a mechanical error in qualifying and a lack of owner points from the previous season (from the former No. 91 team). The No. 10 team finished the 2006 season high enough in owners' points to guarantee themselves a starting spot in the first five races in 2007. Riggs had back-to-back top-ten finishes at Martinsville and Texas. Riggs also won the pole for the Coca-Cola 600 and the NEXTEL Open exhibition race at Charlotte. He won the NEXTEL Open, leading all but one lap, and advanced to the NEXTEL All-Star Challenge where he finished tenth. In the Coca-Cola 600, Riggs led ninety laps, but a pit road violation took him out of contention and he finished 13th. His highest ranking in the 2006 NEXTEL Cup points standings has been 18th. Riggs's best finish in the 2006 Nextel Cup season was a fourth-place finish which came at the Sharpie 500 at Bristol Motor Speedway. Riggs won the pole in the Bank of America 500, sweeping both poles at Charlotte.

Riggs struggled in 2007, falling out of the Top 35 in owner's points, and began failing to qualify for several races. During the summer, Riggs did not renew his contract with Evernham, and on October 3, 2007, it was revealed that Riggs had signed a contract to drive Haas CNC Racing's No. 66 Chevrolet for the 2008 season. He was replaced in the No. 10 car for the last two races of 2007 by Patrick Carpentier.

Riggs was released from Haas CNC when that team signed Tony Stewart and became Stewart–Haas Racing. Riggs joined Tommy Baldwin Racing to drive the No. 36 Toyota Camry in the 2009 NASCAR Sprint Cup Series. After qualifying for eight races, including the 2009 Daytona 500, Riggs announced that he was parting ways with TBR, refusing to be a start-and-park driver. He was replaced in favor of Mike Skinner, Brian Simo, and Patrick Carpentier.

On March 30, 2010, it was announced Riggs would drive the No. 90 Chevrolet Impala for Keyed-Up Motorsports on an initial two race contract, taking over from Casey Mears who moved to Joe Gibbs Racing as a standby driver for Denny Hamlin. Riggs was running 25th on the lead lap in the Subway Fresh Fit 600 at Phoenix, but he blew a right-front tire with four laps to go and pounded the third turn wall, forcing a green-white-checkered finish. Riggs went on to finish 28th. Due to sponsorship reasons, Keyed-Up Motorsports announced they would not return to the Sprint Cup Series until they had enough funds to run entire races.

Riggs drove for Whitney Motorsports in four races in 2011. However, after four DNQ's, he was released from the team. He has made several attempts to qualify in the R3 Motorsports No. 23 in late 2011 and 2012.

In 2013, Riggs announced that would begin driving for Xxxtreme Motorsport in the No. 44 Ford Fusion, with sponsorship from No Label Watches, hendrickcars.com, and Everest College. He made his debut at Phoenix, finishing 43rd after blowing a tire.

== Personal life ==
Riggs' son, Layne Riggs, currently competes in the NASCAR Craftsman Truck Series, driving the No. 34 truck for Front Row Motorsports.

== Motorsports career results ==
=== NASCAR ===
(key) (Bold – Pole position awarded by qualifying time. Italics – Pole position earned by points standings or practice time. * – Most laps led.)

==== Sprint Cup Series ====
NASCAR Sprint Cup Series results
Year	Team	No.	Make	1	2	3	4	5	6	7	8	9	10	11	12	13	14	15	16	17	18	19	20	21	22	23	24	25	26	27	28	29	30	31	32	33	34	35	36	NSCC	Pts	Ref
2004	MBV Motorsports	10	Chevy	DAY; 34	CAR; 31	LVS; 29	ATL; 25	DAR; 30	BRI; 34	TEX; 15	MAR; 28	TAL; 34	CAL; 25	RCH; 35	CLT; 25	DOV; 5	POC; 17	MCH; 20	SON; 42	DAY; 21	CHI; 29	NHA; 28	POC; 22	IND; 37	GLN; 23	MCH; 19	BRI; 17	CAL; 7	RCH; 39	NHA; 26	DOV; 31	TAL; 11	KAN; 26	CLT; 38	MAR; 26	ATL; DNQ	PHO; 14	DAR; 25	HOM; 15	29th	3090	
2005	MBV Motorsports	10	Chevy	DAY; 4	CAL; 33	LVS; 31	ATL; 9	BRI; 10	**MAR**; 21	TEX; 32	PHO; 18	TAL; 27	DAR; 36	RCH; 26	CLT; 19	DOV; 11	POC; 37	MCH; 23	SON; 24	DAY; 41	CHI; 23	NHA; 32	POC; 33	IND; 35	GLN; 31	MCH; 2	BRI; 40	CAL; 36	RCH; 29	NHA; 28	DOV; 24	TAL; 36	KAN; 30	CLT; 33	MAR; 24	ATL; 33	TEX; 34	PHO; 38	HOM; 38	34th	2965	
2006	Evernham Motorsports	10	Dodge	DAY; DNQ	CAL; 19	LVS; 28	ATL; 11	BRI; 41	MAR; 10	TEX; 7	PHO; 38	TAL; 9	RCH; 14	DAR; 31	**CLT**; 13	DOV; 20	POC; 8	MCH; 29	SON; 27	DAY; 20	CHI; 15	NHA; 10	POC; 22	IND; 21	GLN; 23	MCH; 14	BRI; 4	CAL; 17	RCH; 10	NHA; 35	DOV; 34	KAN; 34	TAL; 19	**CLT**; 17	MAR; 30	ATL; 22	TEX; 31	PHO; 22	HOM; 7	20th	3619	
2007	Evernham Motorsports	10	Dodge	DAY; 37	CAL; 41	LVS; 23	ATL; 43	BRI; 31	MAR; 8	TEX; 27	PHO; 42	TAL; 11	RCH; 30	DAR; DNQ	CLT; 20	DOV; 23	POC; 18	MCH; 33	SON; DNQ	NHA; DNQ	DAY; 41	CHI; DNQ	IND; 29	POC; 24	GLN	MCH; 36	BRI; 18	CAL; DNQ	RCH; 40	NHA; 32	DOV; 34	KAN; 13	TAL; DNQ	CLT; 36	MAR; 16	ATL; 29	TEX; 13	PHO	HOM	36th	3125	
2008	Haas CNC Racing	66	Chevy	DAY; 21	CAL; 21	LVS; 36	ATL; 18	BRI; 22	MAR; 41	TEX; 27	PHO; 26	TAL; 16	RCH; 19	DAR; 17	CLT; 28	DOV; 39	POC; 21	MCH; 33		NHA; 34	DAY; DNQ	CHI; 20	IND; 25	POC; 29	GLN; 34	MCH; 15	BRI; 27	CAL; 25	RCH; 31	NHA; 19	DOV; 25	KAN; 42	TAL; 7	CLT; 19	MAR; 21	ATL; 43	TEX; 25	PHO; 38	HOM; 14	31st	2797	
2008	Haas CNC Racing	70	Chevy																SON; DNQ																					31st	2797	
2009	Tommy Baldwin Racing	36	Toyota	DAY; 25	CAL; 36	LVS; DNQ	ATL; DNQ	BRI; DNQ	MAR; 30	TEX; DNQ	PHO; 36	TAL; 41	RCH; 42	DAR; 39	CLT; 38	DOV	POC	MCH	SON	NHA	DAY	CHI	IND	POC	GLN	MCH	BRI	ATL	RCH	NHA	DOV	KAN	CAL	CLT	MAR	TAL	TEX	PHO	HOM	48th	448	
2010	Keyed-Up Motorsports	90	Chevy	DAY	CAL	LVS	ATL	BRI	MAR	PHO; 28	TEX	TAL	RCH	DAR	DOV	CLT	POC	MCH	SON	NHA	DAY	CHI	IND	POC	GLN															64th	116	
2010	Prism Motorsports	66	Toyota																							MCH; DNQ	BRI; 42	ATL; DNQ	RCH; DNQ	NHA	DOV	KAN	CAL	CLT	MAR	TAL				64th	116	
2010	Whitney Motorsports	81	Chevy																																		TEX; DNQ	PHO	HOM	64th	116	
2011	Whitney Motorsports	81	Chevy	DAY	PHO	LVS	BRI	CAL	MAR	TEX	TAL	RCH	DAR; DNQ	DOV; DNQ	CLT; DNQ	KAN; 42	POC; 43	MCH; 42	SON	DAY	KEN; 42	NHA; DNQ	IND	POC	GLN	MCH	BRI	ATL	RCH	CHI	NHA	DOV	KAN	CLT	TAL	MAR	TEX			78th	0^{1}	
2011	R3 Motorsports	23	Toyota																																			PHO; DNQ		78th	0^{1}	
2011	K Automotive Racing	92	Chevy																																				HOM; DNQ	78th	0^{1}	
2012	R3 Motorsports	23	Chevy	DAY	PHO; 42	LVS; DNQ	BRI; 41	CAL; 41	MAR; 42	TEX; 42	KAN; 43	RCH; DNQ	TAL	DAR; DNQ	CLT; DNQ	DOV; 37	POC; 40	MCH; 41	SON	KEN; 43	DAY	NHA; 41	IND; 41	POC; 43	GLN	MCH; 41	BRI; 41	ATL; 40	RCH; 39	CHI; DNQ	NHA; DNQ	DOV; 42	TAL	CLT; DNQ	KAN	MAR; 42	TEX	PHO	HOM; 42	46th	56	
2013	Xxxtreme Motorsport	44	Ford	DAY	PHO; 43	LVS	BRI; DNQ	CAL; 41	MAR; 42	TEX; DNQ	KAN	RCH	TAL	DAR	CLT	DOV; 43	POC; 41	MCH; DNQ	SON	KEN; 43	DAY	NHA	IND	POC	GLN															47th	11	
2013	Humphrey Smith Racing	19	Toyota																							MCH; DNQ	BRI	ATL	RCH	CHI										47th	11	
2013	Leavine Family Racing	95	Ford																												NHA; 43	DOV	KAN	CLT	TAL	MAR	TEX	PHO	HOM	47th	11	

===== Daytona 500 =====
Year	Team	Manufacturer	Start	Finish
2004	MBV Motorsports	Chevrolet	36	34
2005	MBV Motorsports	Chevrolet	12	4
2006	Evernham Motorsports	Dodge	DNQ	
2007	Evernham Motorsports	Dodge	32	37
2008	Haas CNC Racing	Chevrolet	27	21
2009	Tommy Baldwin Racing	Toyota	17	25

==== Nationwide Series ====
NASCAR Nationwide Series results
Year	Team	No.	Make	1	2	3	4	5	6	7	8	9	10	11	12	13	14	15	16	17	18	19	20	21	22	23	24	25	26	27	28	29	30	31	32	33	34	35	NNSC	Pts	Ref
2002	ppc Racing	10	Ford	DAY; 6	CAR; 4	LVS; 34	DAR; 20	**BRI**; 9	TEX; 4	NSH; 1	TAL; 19	CAL; 1	RCH; 27	NHA; 7	NZH; 2	CLT; 3	DOV; 11	NSH; 20	**KEN**; 4*	MLW; 37	DAY; 15	CHI; 30	GTY; 27	PPR; 16	IRP; 11*	MCH; 6	BRI; 18	DAR; 10	RCH; 34	DOV; 14	KAN; 23*	CLT; 39	MEM; 36	ATL; 4	CAR; 18	PHO; 40	HOM; 17		10th	4023	
2003	ppc Racing	10	Ford	DAY; 31	CAR; 17	LVS; 20	DAR; 3	BRI; 23	TEX; 2	TAL; 24	NSH; 11	CAL; 20	RCH; 2*	GTY; 1	NZH; 15	CLT; 3	DOV; 2	NSH; 1*	KEN; 30	MLW; 7*	DAY; 6	CHI; 7	NHA; 14	PPR; 3	IRP; 5	MCH; 5	BRI; 9	DAR; 17	RCH; 29	DOV; 3	KAN; 13	CLT; 13	MEM; 12	ATL; 6	PHO; 6	CAR; 38	HOM; 41		6th	4462	
2005	SKI Motorsports	30	Chevy	DAY	CAL	MXC	LVS; 21	ATL	NSH	BRI	TEX	PHO	TAL	DAR	RCH	CLT; DNQ	DOV	NSH	KEN	MLW	DAY	CHI	NHA	PPR	GTY	IRP	GLN	MCH	BRI	CAL	RCH	DOV	KAN	CLT	MEM	TEX	PHO	HOM	111th	100	
2006	Evernham Motorsports	9	Dodge	DAY	CAL	MXC	LVS	ATL	BRI; 6	TEX	NSH	PHO; 37	TAL; 11	RCH	DAR	CLT	DOV	NSH	KEN	MLW	DAY	CHI	NHA; 7	MAR	GTY	IRP	GLN	MCH; 19	BRI	CAL	RCH; 10	**DOV**; 12	KAN	CLT	MEM	TEX	PHO	HOM	48th	850	
2007	Evernham Motorsports	9	Dodge	DAY	CAL; 16	MXC	LVS	ATL	BRI	NSH	TEX	PHO	TAL	RCH; 17	DAR; 17	CLT	DOV	NSH	KEN	MLW	NHA; 14	DAY	CHI	GTY	IRP	CGV	GLN	MCH	BRI	CAL	RCH	DOV	KAN	CLT	MEM	TEX	PHO	HOM	74th	460	
2010	RAB Racing	09	Ford	DAY; 15	CAL; 16	LVS; 14	BRI; DNQ	NSH; 19	PHO	TEX	TAL	RCH	DAR	DOV	CLT																								54th	471	
2010	Richard Childress Racing	21	Chevy													NSH; 9	KEN; 9	ROA	NHA	DAY	CHI	GTY	IRP	IOW	GLN	MCH	BRI	CGV	ATL	RCH	DOV	KAN	CAL	CLT	GTY	TEX	PHO	HOM	54th	471	
2011	R3 Motorsports	23	Dodge	DAY	PHO	LVS	BRI	CAL	TEX	TAL	NSH	RCH	DAR; 13	DOV	IOW	CLT	CHI																						40th	112	
2011	R3 Motorsports	03	Chevy															MCH; 37	ROA	DAY								BRI; 37	ATL; 38	RCH; 41	CHI; 36		KAN; 36	CLT; 39	TEX; 27	PHO	HOM; 37		40th	112	
2011	R3 Motorsports	03	Dodge																		KEN; 36	NHA	NSH	IRP	IOW	GLN	CGV												40th	112	
2011	R3 Motorsports	23	Chevy																													DOV; 31							40th	112	
2012	Rick Ware Racing	15	Chevy	DAY	PHO	LVS	BRI	CAL; 37																															138th	0^{1}	
2012	Rick Ware Racing	75	Chevy						TEX; 38			DAR; 38	IOW	CLT	DOV; 36	MCH; 37	ROA									BRI; 38	ATL	RCH; 36			DOV; 36	CLT; 40	KAN						138th	0^{1}	
2012	Rick Ware Racing	15	Ford							RCH; DNQ	TAL											IND; 37	IOW	GLN	CGV														138th	0^{1}	
2012	Mike Harmon Racing	74	Chevy															KEN; 37	DAY																				138th	0^{1}	
2012	Rick Ware Racing	71	Ford																	NHA; 34	CHI																		138th	0^{1}	
2012	Rick Ware Racing	71	Chevy																										CHI; 37	KEN									138th	0^{1}	
2012	R3 Motorsports	03	Chevy																															TEX; 34	PHO				138th	0^{1}	
2012	Rick Ware Racing	75	Ford																																	HOM; DNQ			138th	0^{1}	
2013	Rick Ware Racing	15	Ford	DAY	PHO	LVS	BRI; 20																																119th	0^{1}	
2013	The Motorsports Group	47	Chevy					CAL; 39	TEX; DNQ	RCH	TAL	DAR	CLT	DOV	IOW																								119th	0^{1}	
2013	Rick Ware Racing	23	Ford													MCH; 23	ROA	KEN	DAY	NHA	CHI	IND	IOW	GLN	MOH	BRI	ATL	RCH	CHI	KEN	DOV	KAN	CLT	TEX	PHO	HOM			119th	0^{1}	

==== Camping World Truck Series ====
NASCAR Camping World Truck Series results
Year	Team	No.	Make	1	2	3	4	5	6	7	8	9	10	11	12	13	14	15	16	17	18	19	20	21	22	23	24	25	NCWTC	Pts	Ref
1999	Long Brothers Racing	84	Ford	HOM	PHO	EVG	MMR	MAR	MEM	PPR	I70	BRI	TEX	PIR	GLN	MLW	NSV	NZH	MCH	NHA	IRP; 19	GTY	HPT	RCH; 23	LVS	LVL	TEX	CAL	67th	200	
2000	Long Brothers Racing	84	Ford	DAY	HOM	PHO	MMR	MAR; 9	PIR	GTY																			20th	2078	
2000	Impact Motorsports	86	Dodge								MEM; 12	PPR; 9	EVG; 9	TEX; 10	KEN; 23	GLN; 24	MLW; 9	NHA; 6	NZH; 27	MCH; 11	IRP; 15	NSV; 7	CIC; 30	RCH; 5	DOV; 19	TEX			20th	2078	
2000	Brevak Racing	31	Ford																								CAL; 16		20th	2078	
2001	Ultra Motorsports	2	Dodge	DAY; 3	**HOM**; 4	MMR; 5	MAR; 1*	GTY; 2	DAR; 3	PPR; 2	**DOV**; 1	TEX; 26	MEM; 2	MLW; 24	KAN; 7	KEN; 1	NHA; 24	IRP; 21	**NSH**; 1*	CIC; 1	NZH; 13	RCH; 14	SBO; 3	**TEX**; 13*	LVS; 4	PHO; 8	**CAL**; 32		5th	3526	
2011	SS-Green Light Racing	07	Toyota	DAY	PHO	DAR	MAR	NSH	DOV	CLT	KAN; 36	TEX	KEN	IOW	NSH	IRP	POC	MCH	BRI	ATL	CHI	NHA	KEN	LVS	TAL	MAR	TEX	HOM	115th	0^{1}	
2012	Mike Harmon Racing	74	Chevy	DAY	MAR	CAR	KAN; DNQ	CLT	DOV	TEX				POC; 32			ATL; 33	IOW	KEN	LVS	TAL		TEX; 34	PHO	HOM				86th	0^{1}	
2012	Alger Motorsports	86	Ram								KEN; 36	IOW	CHI																86th	0^{1}	
2012	RSS Racing	5	Chevy												MCH; 32	BRI													86th	0^{1}	
2012	RBR Enterprises	92	Chevy																			MAR; 5							86th	0^{1}	
2013	RBR Enterprises	92	Chevy	DAY; 36	MAR; 35	CAR	KAN	CLT; 11	DOV	TEX	KEN; 23	IOW	ELD	POC					CHI; 29	LVS	TAL	MAR; 9	TEX; 22	PHO	HOM				94th	0^{1}	
2013	RSS Racing	38	Chevy												MCH; 29	BRI	MSP	IOW											94th	0^{1}	
2014	RBR Enterprises	92	Ford	DAY	MAR	KAN	CLT; 24	DOV; 13	TEX	GTW	KEN	IOW	ELD	POC	MCH	BRI	MSP	CHI	NHA	LVS	TAL	MAR	TEX	PHO	HOM				50th	51	

==== Winston West Series ====
NASCAR Winston West Series results
Year	Team	No.	Make	1	2	3	4	5	6	7	8	9	10	11	12	13	14	NWWSC	Pts	Ref
2001	Ultra Motorsports	2	Dodge	PHO	LVS	TUS	MMR	CAL	IRW	LAG	KAN	EVG	CNS	IRW	RMR	LVS; 20*	IRW	52nd	113	

==== Corona Series ====
NASCAR Corona Series results
Year	Team	No.	Make	1	2	3	4	5	6	7	8	9	10	11	12	13	14	NCSC	Pts	Ref
2010	HO Racing	15	Toyota	AGS	QRO	SLP	TXG	MXC	PUE	GDL	MTY	SLP	MXC	QRO	PUE	TXG	AGS; 28	45th	79	

=== ARCA Re/Max Series ===
(key) (Bold – Pole position awarded by qualifying time. Italics – Pole position earned by points standings or practice time. * – Most laps led.)

ARCA Re/Max Series results
Year	Team	No.	Make	1	2	3	4	5	6	7	8	9	10	11	12	13	14	15	16	17	18	19	20	21	22	ARSC	Pts	Ref
2004	Ken Schrader Racing	99	Pontiac	DAY	ATL	NSH	SLM	KEN	CLT	KAN	POC; 1	MCH	TOL	SBO	KEN	BLN	POC	NSH	ISF	WIN	DSF	CHI	SLM	TAL	CLT	100th	230	

=== CARS Late Model Stock Car Tour ===
(key) (Bold – Pole position awarded by qualifying time. Italics – Pole position earned by points standings or practice time. * – Most laps led. ** – All laps led.)

CARS Late Model Stock Car Tour results
Year	Team	No.	Make	1	2	3	4	5	6	7	8	9	10	11	12	CLMSCTC	Pts	Ref
2018	Scott Riggs	99	Ford	TCM	MYB	ROU; 16	HCY	BRI	ACE	CCS	KPT	HCY	WKS	ROU	SBO	62nd	17	

^{*} Season still in progress
^{1} Ineligible for series points

Awards
Preceded by Greg Biffle	NASCAR Busch Series Rookie of the Year; 2002	Succeeded by David Stremme
