= 2013 NRA 500 =

Race details
- Race 7 of 36 in the 2013 NASCAR Sprint Cup Series
- Date: April 13, 2013
- Location: Texas Motor Speedway in Fort Worth, Texas
- Course: Permanent racing facility
- Course length: 1.5 miles (2.4 km)
- Distance: 334 laps, 501 mi (806.281 km)
- Weather: Overcast with a temperature around 76 °F (24 °C); wind out of the E at 7 miles per hour (11 km/h).
- Average speed: 144.751 mph (232.954 km/h)

Pole position
Driver	Kyle Busch	Joe Gibbs Racing
- Time: 27.509 seconds

Most laps led
Driver	Kyle Busch	Joe Gibbs Racing
- Laps: 171

Winner
No. 18	Kyle Busch	Joe Gibbs Racing

Television in the United States
- Network: Fox
- Announcers: Mike Joy, Darrell Waltrip, Larry McReynolds
- Nielsen ratings: 3.8/7 (6.269 million viewers)

The 2013 NRA 500 was a NASCAR Sprint Cup Series stock car race held on April 13, 2013, at Texas Motor Speedway in Fort Worth, Texas, United States. Contested over 334 laps on the 1.5–mile (2.4 km) quad-oval, it was the seventh race of the 2013 Sprint Cup Series championship. Kyle Busch of Joe Gibbs Racing won the race, his second win of the 2013 season and first at Texas, while Martin Truex Jr. finished second. Carl Edwards, Greg Biffle, and Joey Logano rounded out the top five.

By also winning the Friday night Nationwide Series race, Busch completed his second weekend sweep of 2013, having also accomplished this at Fontana. A Texas man committed suicide by putting a gun to his head and shooting himself after an argument with another fan near an infield.

== Report ==
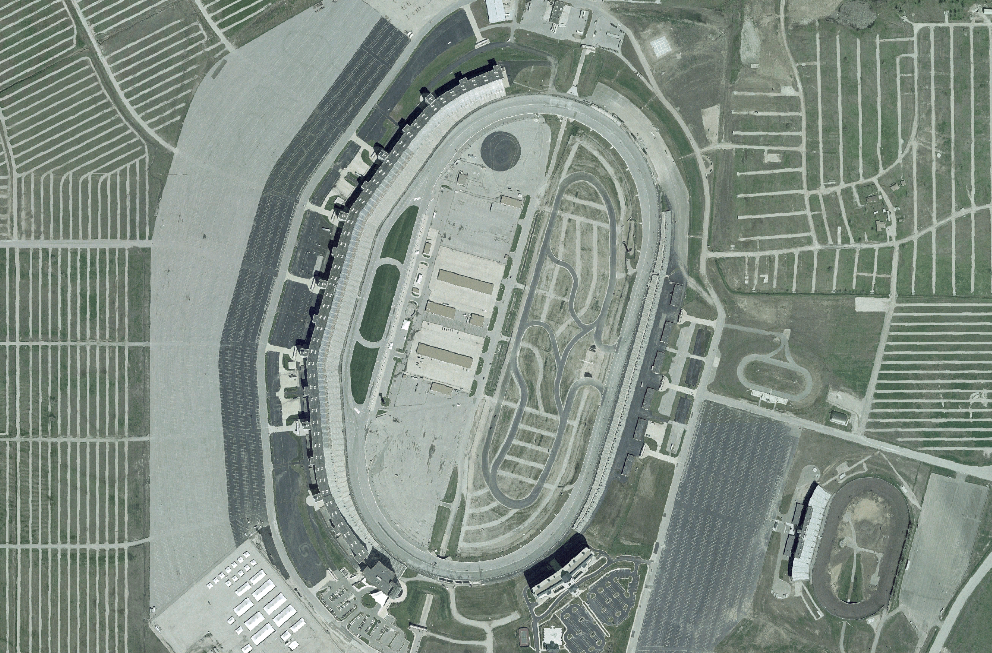
Texas Motor Speedway, the race track where the race was held.

=== Background ===
Texas Motor Speedway is a four-turn quad-oval track that is 1.5 miles (2.4 km) long. The track's turns are banked at twenty-four degrees, while the front stretch, the location of the finish line, is five degrees. The back stretch, opposite of the front, also has a five degree banking. The racetrack has a permanent capacity of 138,122 spectators, and an infield capacity of 53,000. Greg Biffle is the defending race winner after winning the event in 2012.

Before the race, Jimmie Johnson was leading the Drivers' Championship with 231 points, while Brad Keselowski stood in second with 225 points. Dale Earnhardt Jr. followed in the third position, 17 points ahead of Kyle Busch and 20 ahead of Kasey Kahne in fourth and fifth. Biffle, with 199, was seven points ahead of Carl Edwards and 20 ahead of Clint Bowyer, as Paul Menard was seven points ahead of Matt Kenseth and twelve ahead of Joey Logano in tenth and eleventh. Jeff Gordon completed the first twelve positions with 164 points.

=== Entry list ===
(R) - Denotes rookie driver.

(i) - Denotes driver who is ineligible for series driver points.

No.	Driver	Team	Manufacturer
1	Jamie McMurray	Earnhardt Ganassi Racing	Chevrolet
2	Brad Keselowski	Penske Racing	Ford
5	Kasey Kahne	Hendrick Motorsports	Chevrolet
7	Dave Blaney	Tommy Baldwin Racing	Chevrolet
9	Marcos Ambrose	Richard Petty Motorsports	Ford
10	Danica Patrick (R)	Stewart–Haas Racing	Chevrolet
11	Brian Vickers (i)	Joe Gibbs Racing	Toyota
13	Casey Mears	Germain Racing	Ford
14	Tony Stewart	Stewart–Haas Racing	Chevrolet
15	Clint Bowyer	Michael Waltrip Racing	Toyota
16	Greg Biffle	Roush Fenway Racing	Ford
17	Ricky Stenhouse Jr. (R)	Roush Fenway Racing	Ford
18	Kyle Busch	Joe Gibbs Racing	Toyota
19	Mike Bliss (i)	Humphrey Smith Racing	Toyota
20	Matt Kenseth	Joe Gibbs Racing	Toyota
22	Joey Logano	Penske Racing	Ford
24	Jeff Gordon	Hendrick Motorsports	Chevrolet
27	Paul Menard	Richard Childress Racing	Chevrolet
29	Kevin Harvick	Richard Childress Racing	Chevrolet
30	David Stremme	Swan Racing	Toyota
31	Jeff Burton	Richard Childress Racing	Chevrolet
32	Timmy Hill (R)	FAS Lane Racing	Ford
33	Landon Cassill	Circle Sport	Chevrolet
34	David Ragan	Front Row Motorsports	Ford
35	Josh Wise (i)	Front Row Motorsports	Ford
36	J. J. Yeley	Tommy Baldwin Racing	Chevrolet
38	David Gilliland	Front Row Motorsports	Ford
39	Ryan Newman	Stewart–Haas Racing	Chevrolet
42	Juan Pablo Montoya	Earnhardt Ganassi Racing	Chevrolet
43	Aric Almirola	Richard Petty Motorsports	Ford
44	Scott Riggs	Xxxtreme Motorsports	Ford
47	Bobby Labonte	JTG Daugherty Racing	Toyota
48	Jimmie Johnson	Hendrick Motorsports	Chevrolet
51	A. J. Allmendinger	Phoenix Racing	Chevrolet
55	Mark Martin	Michael Waltrip Racing	Toyota
56	Martin Truex Jr.	Michael Waltrip Racing	Toyota
78	Kurt Busch	Furniture Row Racing	Chevrolet
83	David Reutimann	BK Racing	Toyota
87	Joe Nemechek (i)	NEMCO-Jay Robinson Racing	Toyota
88	Dale Earnhardt Jr.	Hendrick Motorsports	Chevrolet
93	Travis Kvapil	BK Racing	Toyota
95	Scott Speed	Leavine Family Racing	Ford
98	Michael McDowell	Phil Parsons Racing	Ford
99	Carl Edwards	Roush Fenway Racing	Ford
Official entry list

==== Sponsorship controversy ====
The race's sponsorship by the National Rifle Association of America (NRA) proved to be controversial prior to the race. Although race sponsorships are negotiated with the track owner, not NASCAR itself, the sanctioning organization has final approval and did not object to the sponsorship. Both NASCAR's acceptance of this sponsorship, and its timing, has been controversial, and offensive to gun control activists. Because of the sponsorship, Senator Chris Murphy asked Rupert Murdoch, whose News Corporation owns Fox Sports, which was scheduled to air the race, to not broadcast it. Fox broadcast the race as scheduled, not least because failure to do so would have been a breach of the network's contract with NASCAR. However, Fox only used the official sponsored name once per hour (the minimum mandated by NASCAR) and otherwise referred to it generically (in this case as the "Texas 500"), the network's usual practice when a race's title sponsor does not buy ads during the race broadcast; the NRA reportedly did not seek to purchase any such ads. Duck Commander replaced NRA as the sponsor for the following year's race, while NRA would return as a race sponsor in 2016 for the Bristol Night Race in August at Speedway's owned Bristol Motor Speedway.

=== Practice and qualifying ===
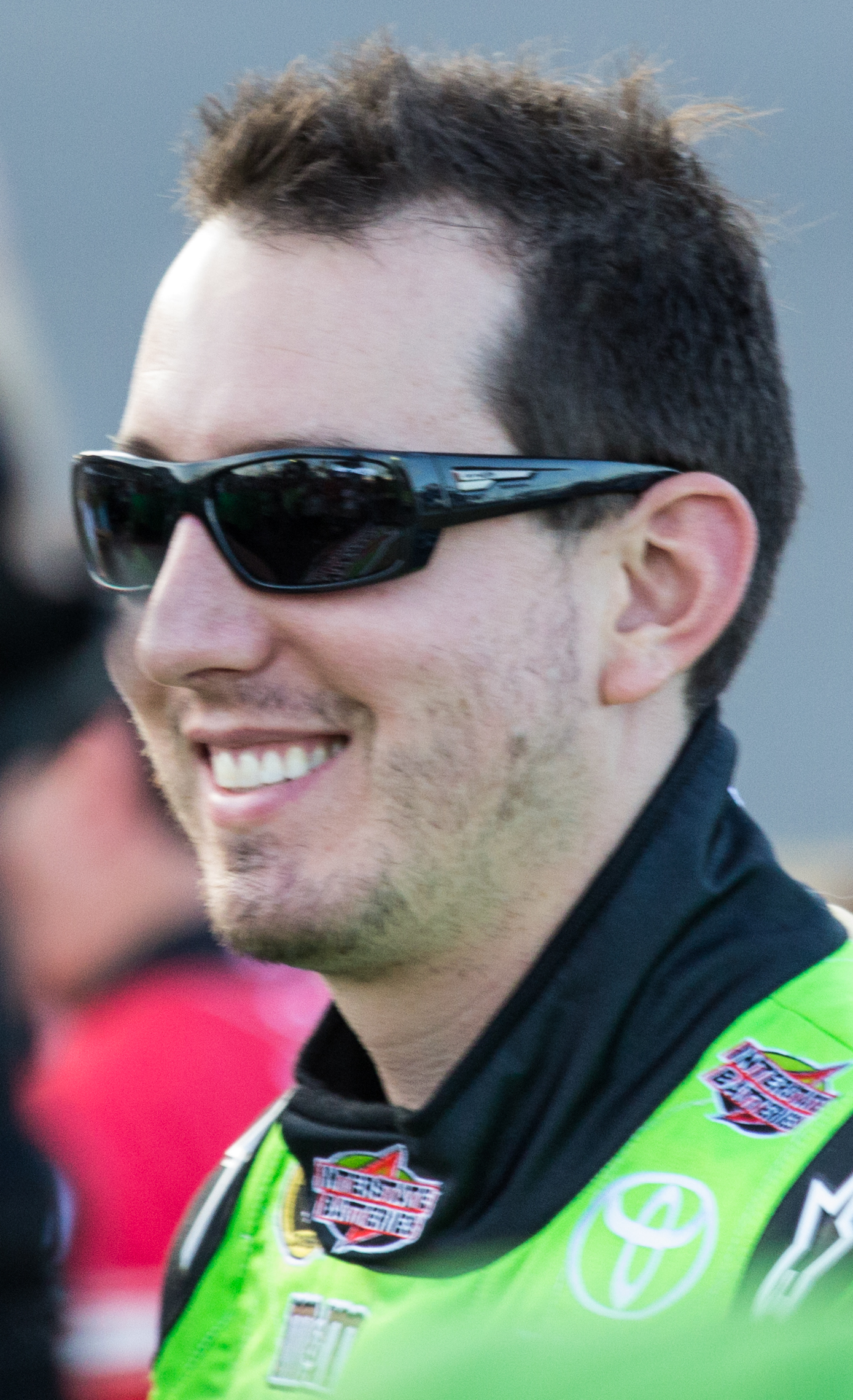
Kyle Busch won the pole position with a time of 27.509 and won the race

Two practice sessions were held in preparation for the race; both on Friday, April 12, 2013. The first session and second session lasted for 90 minutes each. During the first practice session, Martin Truex Jr., for the Michael Waltrip Racing team, was quickest ahead of Earnhardt Jr. in second and Johnson in third. Jamie McMurray was scored fourth, and Kevin Harvick managed fifth. Edwards, Jeff Burton, Kenseth, Biffle, and Casey Mears rounded out the top ten quickest drivers in the session.

Marcos Ambrose was quickest in the second and final practice session, ahead of Kyle Busch in second, and Aric Almirola in third. Kurt Busch was fourth quickest, and Truex Jr. took fifth. Juan Pablo Montoya, Burton, Biffle, Paul Menard, and Keselowski followed in the top ten.

During qualifying, forty-five cars were entered, meaning only two cars were not able to start because of NASCAR's qualifying procedure. Kyle Busch clinched his second pole position of the season, with a record-setting time of 27.509 seconds. After his qualifying run, Busch commented, "Not too shabby of a day. ... I feel like we have a good piece for the race. It felt that good. Sometimes you feel that good and it's not very fast." He was joined on the front row of the grid by his brother, Kurt Busch. Almirola qualified third, Ambrose took fourth, and Truex Jr. started fifth. Earnhardt, Johnson, Jeff Gordon, Edwards, and Montoya completed the first ten positions on the grid. The two drivers who failed to qualify for the race were Scott Speed and Scott Riggs.

=== Post-race penalties ===
Three teams were issued penalties after the race. The No. 56 Michael Waltrip Racing car of Martin Truex Jr. was fined six driver points and Michael Waltrip was penalized six owner points for the front car height failing to meet NASCAR specifications. Crew chief Chad Johnston was fined $25,000 and placed on probation until June 5. MWR did not appeal the penalty. The No. 2 and No. 22 Penske Racing cars were considered more controversial. The teams were fined for unapproved suspension parts. Penske Racing appealed the decision, but the only reduction involved the suspension from seven races to three (two plus the Sprint All-Star Race).

The penalties for the No. 2 car:

- Driver Brad Keselowski fined 25 driver points and team owner Roger Penske fined 25 owner points.
- Crew Chief Paul Wolfe fined $100,000, suspended two points races and the Sprint All-Star Race, on probation until December 31
- Car chief Jerry Kelly, team engineer Brian Wilson, and Penske Racing competition director Travis Geisler suspended three races and placed on probation until December 31.

The penalties for the No. 22 car:

- Driver Joey Logano fined 25 driver points and team owner Walt Czarnecki fined 25 owner points.
- Crew Chief Todd Gordon fined $100,000, suspended two points races and the Sprint All-Star Race, on probation until December 31
- Car chief Raymond Fox and team engineer Samuel Stanley suspended three races and placed on probation until December 31.

== Results ==
=== Qualifying ===
Grid	No.	Driver	Team	Manufacturer	Time	Speed
1	18	Kyle Busch	Joe Gibbs Racing	Toyota	27.509	196.299
2	78	Kurt Busch	Furniture Row Racing	Chevrolet	27.595	195.688
3	43	Aric Almirola	Richard Petty Motorsports	Ford	27.691	195.009
4	9	Marcos Ambrose	Richard Petty Motorsports	Ford	27.700	194.946
5	56	Martin Truex Jr.	Michael Waltrip Racing	Toyota	27.725	194.770
6	88	Dale Earnhardt Jr.	Hendrick Motorsports	Chevrolet	27.759	194.532
7	48	Jimmie Johnson	Hendrick Motorsports	Chevrolet	27.763	194.503
8	24	Jeff Gordon	Hendrick Motorsports	Chevrolet	27.811	194.168
9	99	Carl Edwards	Roush Fenway Racing	Ford	27.814	194.147
10	42	Juan Pablo Montoya	Earnhardt Ganassi Racing	Chevrolet	27.834	194.007
11	1	Jamie McMurray	Earnhardt Ganassi Racing	Chevrolet	27.861	193.819
12	51	Austin Dillon	Phoenix Racing	Chevrolet	27.869	193.764
13	14	Tony Stewart	Stewart–Haas Racing	Chevrolet	27.888	193.632
14	5	Kasey Kahne	Hendrick Motorsports	Chevrolet	27.914	193.451
15	11	Brian Vickers	Joe Gibbs Racing	Toyota	27.915	193.444
16	2	Brad Keselowski	Penske Racing	Ford	27.917	193.431
17	17	Ricky Stenhouse Jr.	Roush Fenway Racing	Ford	27.951	193.195
18	22	Joey Logano	Penske Racing	Ford	27.996	192.885
19	27	Paul Menard	Richard Childress Racing	Chevrolet	28.011	192.781
20	20	Matt Kenseth	Joe Gibbs Racing	Toyota	28.014	192.761
21	31	Jeff Burton	Richard Childress Racing	Chevrolet	28.014	192.761
22	21	Trevor Bayne	Wood Brothers Racing	Ford	28.015	192.754
23	55	Mark Martin	Michael Waltrip Racing	Toyota	28.031	192.644
24	13	Casey Mears	Germain Racing	Ford	28.038	192.596
25	34	David Ragan	Front Row Motorsports	Ford	28.044	192.555
26	15	Clint Bowyer	Michael Waltrip Racing	Toyota	28.086	192.267
27	38	David Gilliland	Front Row Motorsports	Ford	28.110	192.102
28	7	Dave Blaney	Tommy Baldwin Racing	Chevrolet	28.141	191.891
29	29	Kevin Harvick	Richard Childress Racing	Chevrolet	28.164	191.734
30	47	Bobby Labonte	JTG Daugherty Racing	Toyota	28.188	191.571
31	39	Ryan Newman	Stewart–Haas Racing	Chevrolet	28.190	191.557
32	93	Travis Kvapil	BK Racing	Toyota	28.231	191.279
33	30	David Stremme	Swan Racing	Toyota	28.251	191.144
34	19	Mike Bliss	Humphrey Smith Motorsports	Toyota	28.283	190.927
35	16	Greg Biffle	Roush Fenway Racing	Ford	28.284	190.921
36	36	J. J. Yeley	Tommy Baldwin Racing	Chevrolet	28.316	190.705
37	98	Michael McDowell	Phil Parsons Racing	Ford	28.317	190.698
38	83	David Reutimann	BK Racing	Toyota	28.418	190.020
39	33	Landon Cassill	Circle Sport	Chevrolet	28.517	189.361
40	35	Josh Wise	Front Row Motorsports	Ford	28.552	189.129
41	87	Joe Nemechek	NEMCO-Jay Robinson Racing	Toyota	28.699	188.160
42	10	Danica Patrick	Stewart–Haas Racing	Chevrolet	28.709	188.094
43	32	Timmy Hill	FAS Lane Racing	Ford	28.987	186.290
Failed to Qualify
	95	Scott Speed	Leavine Family Racing	Ford	28.782	187.617
	44	Scott Riggs	Xxxtreme Motorsports	Ford	29.009	186.149

=== Race results ===
Pos	Car	Driver	Team	Manufacturer	Laps	Points
1	18	Kyle Busch	Joe Gibbs Racing	Toyota	334	48
2	56	Martin Truex Jr.	Michael Waltrip Racing	Toyota	334	43
3	99	Carl Edwards	Roush Fenway Racing	Ford	334	41
4	16	Greg Biffle	Roush Fenway Racing	Ford	334	40
5	22	Joey Logano	Penske Racing	Ford	334	40
6	48	Jimmie Johnson	Hendrick Motorsports	Chevrolet	334	38
7	43	Aric Almirola	Richard Petty Motorsports	Ford	334	37
8	11	Brian Vickers	Joe Gibbs Racing	Toyota	334	–
9	2	Brad Keselowski	Penske Racing	Ford	334	35
10	39	Ryan Newman	Stewart–Haas Racing	Chevrolet	334	35
11	5	Kasey Kahne	Hendrick Motorsports	Chevrolet	334	33
12	20	Matt Kenseth	Joe Gibbs Racing	Toyota	334	32
13	29	Kevin Harvick	Richard Childress Racing	Chevrolet	334	31
14	55	Mark Martin	Michael Waltrip Racing	Toyota	334	30
15	15	Clint Bowyer	Michael Waltrip Racing	Toyota	334	29
16	1	Jamie McMurray	Earnhardt Ganassi Racing	Chevrolet	334	28
17	27	Paul Menard	Richard Childress Racing	Chevrolet	334	27
18	21	Trevor Bayne	Wood Brothers Racing	Ford	334	–
19	9	Marcos Ambrose	Richard Petty Motorsports	Ford	333	25
20	42	Juan Pablo Montoya	Earnhardt Ganassi Racing	Chevrolet	333	24
21	14	Tony Stewart	Stewart–Haas Racing	Chevrolet	333	23
22	93	Travis Kvapil	BK Racing	Toyota	332	22
23	31	Jeff Burton	Richard Childress Racing	Chevrolet	332	21
24	83	David Reutimann	BK Racing	Toyota	332	20
25	7	Dave Blaney	Tommy Baldwin Racing	Chevrolet	332	19
26	34	David Ragan	Front Row Motorsports	Ford	331	19
27	30	David Stremme	Swan Racing	Toyota	331	17
28	10	Danica Patrick	Stewart–Haas Racing	Chevrolet	331	16
29	88	Dale Earnhardt Jr.	Hendrick Motorsports	Chevrolet	330	15
30	35	Josh Wise	Front Row Motorsports	Ford	330	–
31	13	Casey Mears	Germain Racing	Ford	330	13
32	38	David Gilliland	Front Row Motorsports	Ford	329	13
33	51	Austin Dillon	Phoenix Racing	Chevrolet	326	–
34	33	Landon Cassill	Circle Sport	Chevrolet	326	10
35	87	Joe Nemechek	NEMCO-Jay Robinson Racing	Toyota	324	–
36	32	Timmy Hill	FAS Lane Racing	Ford	322	–
37	78	Kurt Busch	Furniture Row Racing	Chevrolet	316	7
38	24	Jeff Gordon	Hendrick Motorsports	Chevrolet	306	7
39	36	J. J. Yeley	Tommy Baldwin Racing	Chevrolet	293	5
40	17	Ricky Stenhouse Jr.	Roush Fenway Racing	Ford	290	4
41	19	Mike Bliss	Humphrey Smith Motorsports	Toyota	140	–
42	47	Bobby Labonte	JTG Daugherty Racing	Toyota	138	2
43	98	Michael McDowell	Phil Parsons Racing	Ford	44	1

== Standings after the race ==
Drivers' Championship standings

	Pos	Driver	Points
	1	Jimmie Johnson	269
2	2	Kyle Busch	251 (–18)
3	3	Greg Biffle	239 (–30)
2	4	Brad Keselowski	235 (–34)
2	5	Carl Edwards	234 (–35)

Manufacturers' Championship standings

Pos	Manufacturer	Points
1	Chevrolet	49
2	Toyota	49 (–0)
3	Ford	35 (–14)

- Note: Only the first twelve positions are included for the driver standings.

Previous race: 2013 STP Gas Booster 500	Sprint Cup Series; 2013 season	Next race: 2013 STP 400
